= 2005 Darwin V8 Supercars =

Motor race

(Northern Territory) 2005 Darwin V8 Supercars
Event Information
- Round 6 of 13 in the 2005 V8 Supercar Championship Series
- Date: 1–3 July 2005
- Location: Darwin, Northern Territory
- Venue: Hidden Valley Raceway
- Weather: Sunny

Results
Race 1
Distance	17 laps	50 km
Pole position	Mark Skaife; Holden Racing Team	1:08.7300
Winner	Todd Kelly; Holden Racing Team	20:08.1710
Race 2
Distance	48 laps	140 km
Winner	Todd Kelly; Holden Racing Team	01:00:27.6924
Race 3
Distance	48 laps	140 km
Winner	Garth Tander; HSV Dealer Team	01:01:10.5109
Round Results
First	Todd Kelly; Holden Racing Team	190 pts
Second	Garth Tander; HSV Dealer Team	180 pts
Third	Rick Kelly; HSV Dealer Team	164 pts

The 2005 Darwin V8 Supercars (known for sponsorship reasons as the 2005 SkyCity V8 Supercars) was the sixth round of the 2005 V8 Supercar Championship Series. It was held on the weekend of 1 to 3 July at the Hidden Valley Raceway in Darwin, Northern Territory.

The Holden Racing Team carried on their dominant form exhibited in the previous round in China with Mark Skaife claiming pole position and Todd Kelly winning the first two races en route to claiming overall round honours. Garth Tander won the third race of the weekend and would claim second overall for the round while HSV Dealer Team teammate Rick Kelly claimed third overall.

== Background ==
The event was held on the weekend of 1 to 3 July 2005. It was the eighth V8 Supercar event to be held at Hidden Valley Raceway and consisted of one 50 km opener followed by two 140 km races with compulsory pitstops in each

=== Entry list ===
There were 32 drivers entered into the event which included fifteen BA Ford Falcon's, fifteen VZ Holden Commodore's and two VY Holden Commodore's.

Paul Dumbrell returned to Perkins Engineering to drive the number 24 car. His place at Rod Nash Racing was assumed by Alex Davison. Steve Owen returned to the championship aboard the second Britek Motorsport car.

After dominating the previous round in China, the Holden Racing Team tweaked their livery for the Darwin round which featured a special "50 Round Wins" decal on the bonnet of both cars.

== Race report ==
=== Qualifying ===
Pos.	No.	Driver	Team	Vehicle	Time
1	2	(Australia) Mark Skaife	Holden Racing Team	Holden Commodore (VZ)	1:08.8921
2	888	(Australia) Craig Lowndes	Triple Eight Race Engineering	Ford Falcon (BA)	1:09.0925
3	22	(Australia) Todd Kelly	Holden Racing Team	Holden Commodore (VZ)	1:09.0939
4	11	(New Zealand) Steven Richards	Perkins Engineering	Holden Commodore (VY)	1:09.1579
5	20	(Australia) Mark Winterbottom	Larkham Motorsport	Ford Falcon (BA)	1:09.2066
6	67	(Australia) Paul Morris	Paul Morris Motorsport	Holden Commodore (VZ)	1:09.2805
7	16	(Australia) Garth Tander	HSV Dealer Team	Holden Commodore (VZ)	1:09.3357
8	1	(Australia) Marcos Ambrose	Stone Brothers Racing	Ford Falcon (BA)	1:09.3734
9	6	(Australia) Jason Bright	Ford Performance Racing	Ford Falcon (BA)	1:09.3975
10	021	(New Zealand) Paul Radisich	Team Kiwi Racing	Holden Commodore (VZ)	1:09.4551
11	3	(New Zealand) Jason Richards	Tasman Motorsport	Holden Commodore (VZ)	1:09.4837
12	18	(Australia) Glenn Seton	Dick Johnson Racing	Ford Falcon (BA)	1:09.5070
13	10	(Australia) Jason Bargwanna	Larkham Motorsport	Ford Falcon (BA)	1:09.5236
14	44	(New Zealand) Simon Wills	Team Dynamik	Holden Commodore (VZ)	1:09.5250
15	5	(Australia) Greg Ritter	Ford Performance Racing	Ford Falcon (BA)	1:09.5465
16	12	(Australia) John Bowe	Brad Jones Racing	Ford Falcon (BA)	1:09.5650
17	88	(Australia) Steven Ellery	Triple Eight Race Engineering	Ford Falcon (BA)	1:09.6025
18	8	(New Zealand) Craig Baird	WPS Racing	Ford Falcon (BA)	1:09.6254
19	24	(Australia) Paul Dumbrell	Perkins Engineering	Holden Commodore (VY)	1:09.6824
20	15	(Australia) Rick Kelly	HSV Dealer Team	Holden Commodore (VZ)	1:09.8505
21	45	(Brazil) Max Wilson	Team Dynamik	Holden Commodore (VZ)	1:09.8764
22	17	(Australia) Steven Johnson	Dick Johnson Racing	Ford Falcon (BA)	1:09.9176
23	21	(Australia) Brad Jones	Brad Jones Racing	Ford Falcon (BA)	1:09.9831
24	51	(New Zealand) Greg Murphy	Paul Weel Racing	Holden Commodore (VZ)	1:10.0629
25	23	(Australia) Jamie Whincup	Tasman Motorsport	Holden Commodore (VZ)	1:10.1103
26	50	(Australia) Paul Weel	Paul Weel Racing	Holden Commodore (VZ)	1:10.1357
27	33	(Australia) Cameron McConville	Garry Rogers Motorsport	Holden Commodore (VZ)	1:10.1368
28	25	(Australia) Steve Owen	Britek Motorsport	Ford Falcon (BA)	1:10.3104
29	52	(Australia) Matthew White	Britek Motorsport	Ford Falcon (BA)	1:10.3149
30	34	(Australia) Andrew Jones	Garry Rogers Motorsport	Holden Commodore (VZ)	1:10.3376
31	75	(Australia) Anthony Tratt	Paul Little Racing	Holden Commodore (VY)	1:10.3580
32	48	(Australia) David Besnard	WPS Racing	Ford Falcon (BA)	1:10.3947
105% time - 1:12.3367
33	7	(Australia) Alex Davison	Rod Nash Racing	Holden Commodore (VZ)	2:59.1642
-	9	(Australia) Russell Ingall	Stone Brothers Racing	Ford Falcon (BA)	no time

=== Top ten shootout ===
Pos.	No.	Driver	Team	Vehicle	Time
1	2	(Australia) Mark Skaife	Holden Racing Team	Holden Commodore (VZ)	1:08.7300
2	22	(Australia) Todd Kelly	Holden Racing Team	Holden Commodore (VZ)	1:09.0249
3	888	(Australia) Craig Lowndes	Triple Eight Race Engineering	Ford Falcon (BA)	1:09.0323
4	1	(Australia) Marcos Ambrose	Stone Brothers Racing	Ford Falcon (BA)	1:09.2677
5	11	(New Zealand) Steven Richards	Perkins Engineering	Holden Commodore (VY)	1:09.3079
6	16	(Australia) Garth Tander	HSV Dealer Team	Holden Commodore (VZ)	1:09.3835
7	021	(New Zealand) Paul Radisich	Team Kiwi Racing	Holden Commodore (VZ)	1:09.4329
8	67	(Australia) Paul Morris	Paul Morris Motorsport	Holden Commodore (VZ)	1:09.4812
9	6	(Australia) Jason Bright	Ford Performance Racing	Ford Falcon (BA)	1:09.7235
10	20	(Australia) Mark Winterbottom	Larkham Motorsport	Ford Falcon (BA)	1:09.9615

=== Race 1 ===
Pos	No	Driver	Team	Car	Laps	Time/Retired	Grid
1	22	(Australia) Todd Kelly	Holden Racing Team	Holden Commodore (VZ)	17	20:08.171	2
2	2	(Australia) Mark Skaife	Holden Racing Team	Holden Commodore (VZ)	17	+ 0.695	1
3	888	(Australia) Craig Lowndes	Triple Eight Race Engineering	Ford Falcon (BA)	17	+ 1.067	3
4	1	(Australia) Marcos Ambrose	Stone Brothers Racing	Ford Falcon (BA)	17	+ 2.344	4
5	16	(Australia) Garth Tander	HSV Dealer Team	Holden Commodore (VZ)	17	+ 11.011	6
6	021	(New Zealand) Paul Radisich	Team Kiwi Racing	Holden Commodore (VZ)	17	+ 11.997	7
7	67	(Australia) Paul Morris	Paul Morris Motorsport	Holden Commodore (VZ)	17	+ 12.913	8
8	18	(Australia) Glenn Seton	Dick Johnson Racing	Ford Falcon (BA)	17	+ 14.611	12
9	15	(Australia) Rick Kelly	HSV Dealer Team	Holden Commodore (VZ)	17	+ 18.717	20
10	12	(Australia) John Bowe	Brad Jones Racing	Ford Falcon (BA)	17	+ 22.544	16
11	5	(Australia) Greg Ritter	Ford Performance Racing	Ford Falcon (BA)	17	+ 23.893	15
12	17	(Australia) Steven Johnson	Dick Johnson Racing	Ford Falcon (BA)	17	+ 25.588	22
13	51	(New Zealand) Greg Murphy	Paul Weel Racing	Holden Commodore (VZ)	17	+ 27.329	24
14	9	(Australia) Russell Ingall	Stone Brothers Racing	Ford Falcon (BA)	17	+ 27.422	34
15	23	(Australia) Jamie Whincup	Tasman Motorsport	Holden Commodore (VZ)	17	+ 30.533	25
16	45	(Brazil) Max Wilson	Team Dynamik	Holden Commodore (VZ)	17	+ 33.374	21
17	21	(Australia) Brad Jones	Brad Jones Racing	Ford Falcon (BA)	17	+ 33.627	23
18	33	(Australia) Cameron McConville	Garry Rogers Motorsport	Holden Commodore (VZ)	17	+ 36.142	27
19	34	(Australia) Andrew Jones	Garry Rogers Motorsport	Holden Commodore (VZ)	17	+ 36.862	30
20	25	(Australia) Steve Owen	Britek Motorsport	Ford Falcon (BA)	17	+ 37.792	28
21	52	(Australia) Matthew White	Britek Motorsport	Ford Falcon (BA)	17	+ 38.794	29
22	11	(New Zealand) Steven Richards	Perkins Engineering	Holden Commodore (VY)	17	+ 40.237	5
23	7	(Australia) Alex Davison	Rod Nash Racing	Holden Commodore (VZ)	17	+ 40.695	33
24	20	(Australia) Mark Winterbottom	Larkham Motorsport	Ford Falcon (BA)	17	+ 42.019	10
25	3	(New Zealand) Jason Richards	Tasman Motorsport	Holden Commodore (VZ)	17	+ 42.275	11
26	50	(Australia) Paul Weel	Paul Weel Racing	Holden Commodore (VZ)	16	+ 1 lap	26
27	8	(New Zealand) Craig Baird	WPS Racing	Ford Falcon (BA)	16	+ 1 lap	18
28	88	(Australia) Steven Ellery	Triple Eight Race Engineering	Ford Falcon (BA)	15	+ 2 laps	17
Ret	75	(Australia) Anthony Tratt	Paul Little Racing	Holden Commodore (VY)	15	Retired	31
Ret	24	(Australia) Paul Dumbrell	Perkins Engineering	Holden Commodore (VY)	10	Retired	19
Ret	48	(Australia) David Besnard	WPS Racing	Ford Falcon (BA)	6	Retired	32
Ret	44	(New Zealand) Simon Wills	Team Dynamik	Holden Commodore (VZ)	3	Retired	14
Ret	10	(Australia) Jason Bargwanna	Larkham Motorsport	Ford Falcon (BA)	0	Retired	13
Ret	6	(Australia) Jason Bright	Ford Performance Racing	Ford Falcon (BA)	0	Retired	9
Fastest Lap: Todd Kelly (Holden Racing Team) - 1:09.8544 on lap 3

=== Race 2 ===
Pos	No	Driver	Team	Car	Laps	Time/Retired	Grid
1	22	(Australia) Todd Kelly	Holden Racing Team	Holden Commodore (VZ)	48	01:00:27.6924	1
2	2	(Australia) Mark Skaife	Holden Racing Team	Holden Commodore (VZ)	48	+ 0.722	2
3	16	(Australia) Garth Tander	HSV Dealer Team	Holden Commodore (VZ)	48	+ 2.871	5
4	9	(Australia) Russell Ingall	Stone Brothers Racing	Ford Falcon (BA)	48	+ 3.567	14
5	15	(Australia) Rick Kelly	HSV Dealer Team	Holden Commodore (VZ)	48	+ 4.870	9
6	3	(New Zealand) Jason Richards	Tasman Motorsport	Holden Commodore (VZ)	48	+ 5.197	25
7	18	(Australia) Glenn Seton	Dick Johnson Racing	Ford Falcon (BA)	48	+ 7.083	8
8	021	(New Zealand) Paul Radisich	Team Kiwi Racing	Holden Commodore (VZ)	48	+ 8.329	6
9	6	(Australia) Jason Bright	Ford Performance Racing	Ford Falcon (BA)	48	+ 9.151	34
10	12	(Australia) John Bowe	Brad Jones Racing	Ford Falcon (BA)	48	+ 10.092	10
11	17	(Australia) Steven Johnson	Dick Johnson Racing	Ford Falcon (BA)	48	+ 11.506	12
12	11	(New Zealand) Steven Richards	Perkins Engineering	Holden Commodore (VY)	48	+ 12.307	22
13	88	(Australia) Steven Ellery	Triple Eight Race Engineering	Ford Falcon (BA)	48	+ 13.288	28
14	23	(Australia) Jamie Whincup	Tasman Motorsport	Holden Commodore (VZ)	48	+ 13.663	15
15	24	(Australia) Paul Dumbrell	Perkins Engineering	Holden Commodore (VY)	48	+ 14.334	30
16	51	(New Zealand) Greg Murphy	Paul Weel Racing	Holden Commodore (VZ)	48	+ 14.865	13
17	7	(Australia) Alex Davison	Rod Nash Racing	Holden Commodore (VZ)	48	+ 15.793	23
18	67	(Australia) Paul Morris	Paul Morris Motorsport	Holden Commodore (VZ)	48	+ 16.209	7
19	25	(Australia) Steve Owen	Britek Motorsport	Ford Falcon (BA)	48	+ 18.504	20
20	8	(New Zealand) Craig Baird	WPS Racing	Ford Falcon (BA)	48	+ 18.964	27
21	44	(New Zealand) Simon Wills	Team Dynamik	Holden Commodore (VZ)	48	+ 19.593	32
22	52	(Australia) Matthew White	Britek Motorsport	Ford Falcon (BA)	48	+ 19.949	21
23	5	(Australia) Greg Ritter	Ford Performance Racing	Ford Falcon (BA)	48	+ 21.542	11
24	10	(Australia) Jason Bargwanna	Larkham Motorsport	Ford Falcon (BA)	48	+ 22.552	33
25	75	(Australia) Anthony Tratt	Paul Little Racing	Holden Commodore (VY)	48	+ 31.254	29
26	50	(Australia) Paul Weel	Paul Weel Racing	Holden Commodore (VZ)	48	+ 59.959	26
27	20	(Australia) Mark Winterbottom	Larkham Motorsport	Ford Falcon (BA)	47	+ 1 lap	24
28	1	(Australia) Marcos Ambrose	Stone Brothers Racing	Ford Falcon (BA)	47	+ 1 lap	4
29	48	(Australia) David Besnard	WPS Racing	Ford Falcon (BA)	47	+ 1 lap	31
30	21	(Australia) Brad Jones	Brad Jones Racing	Ford Falcon (BA)	47	+ 1 lap	17
31	33	(Australia) Cameron McConville	Garry Rogers Motorsport	Holden Commodore (VZ)	47	+ 1 lap	18
32	888	(Australia) Craig Lowndes	Triple Eight Race Engineering	Ford Falcon (BA)	43	+ 5 laps	3
33	45	(Brazil) Max Wilson	Team Dynamik	Holden Commodore (VZ)	41	+ 7 laps	16
Ret	34	(Australia) Andrew Jones	Garry Rogers Motorsport	Holden Commodore (VZ)	39	Oil pressure	19
Fastest Lap: Todd Kelly (Holden Racing Team) - 1:10.2408 on lap 6

=== Race 3 ===
Pos	No	Driver	Team	Car	Laps	Time/Retired	Grid
1	16	(Australia) Garth Tander	HSV Dealer Team	Holden Commodore (VZ)	48	01:01:10.5109	3
2	22	(Australia) Todd Kelly	Holden Racing Team	Holden Commodore (VZ)	48	+ 0.339	1
3	15	(Australia) Rick Kelly	HSV Dealer Team	Holden Commodore (VZ)	48	+ 3.733	5
4	11	(New Zealand) Steven Richards	Perkins Engineering	Holden Commodore (VY)	48	+ 4.274	12
5	18	(Australia) Glenn Seton	Dick Johnson Racing	Ford Falcon (BA)	48	+ 6.604	7
6	88	(Australia) Steven Ellery	Triple Eight Race Engineering	Ford Falcon (BA)	48	+ 8.671	13
7	17	(Australia) Steven Johnson	Dick Johnson Racing	Ford Falcon (BA)	48	+ 10.092	11
8	6	(Australia) Jason Bright	Ford Performance Racing	Ford Falcon (BA)	48	+ 12.938	9
9	1	(Australia) Marcos Ambrose	Stone Brothers Racing	Ford Falcon (BA)	48	+ 13.463	28
10	24	(Australia) Paul Dumbrell	Perkins Engineering	Holden Commodore (VY)	48	+ 14.041	15
11	888	(Australia) Craig Lowndes	Triple Eight Race Engineering	Ford Falcon (BA)	48	+ 13.687	32
12	12	(Australia) John Bowe	Brad Jones Racing	Ford Falcon (BA)	48	+ 14.515	10
13	45	(Brazil) Max Wilson	Team Dynamik	Holden Commodore (VZ)	48	+ 16.387	33
14	50	(Australia) Paul Weel	Paul Weel Racing	Holden Commodore (VZ)	48	+ 16.698	26
15	3	(New Zealand) Jason Richards	Tasman Motorsport	Holden Commodore (VZ)	48	+ 17.016	6
16	8	(New Zealand) Craig Baird	WPS Racing	Ford Falcon (BA)	48	+ 17.788	20
17	23	(Australia) Jamie Whincup	Tasman Motorsport	Holden Commodore (VZ)	48	+ 18.484	14
18	67	(Australia) Paul Morris	Paul Morris Motorsport	Holden Commodore (VZ)	48	+ 24.551	18
19	10	(Australia) Jason Bargwanna	Larkham Motorsport	Ford Falcon (BA)	48	+ 25.345	24
20	20	(Australia) Mark Winterbottom	Larkham Motorsport	Ford Falcon (BA)	48	+ 25.893	27
21	25	(Australia) Steve Owen	Britek Motorsport	Ford Falcon (BA)	48	+ 26.190	19
22	33	(Australia) Cameron McConville	Garry Rogers Motorsport	Holden Commodore (VZ)	48	+ 27.170	31
23	52	(Australia) Matthew White	Britek Motorsport	Ford Falcon (BA)	48	+ 27.402	22
24	5	(Australia) Greg Ritter	Ford Performance Racing	Ford Falcon (BA)	48	+ 42.311	23
25	48	(Australia) David Besnard	WPS Racing	Ford Falcon (BA)	47	+ 1 lap	29
26	2	(Australia) Mark Skaife	Holden Racing Team	Holden Commodore (VZ)	46	+ 2 laps	2
27	021	(New Zealand) Paul Radisich	Team Kiwi Racing	Holden Commodore (VZ)	43	+ 4 laps	8
Ret	7	(Australia) Alex Davison	Rod Nash Racing	Holden Commodore (VZ)	36	Retired	17
Ret	44	(New Zealand) Simon Wills	Team Dynamik	Holden Commodore (VZ)	35	Retired	21
Ret	34	(Australia) Andrew Jones	Garry Rogers Motorsport	Holden Commodore (VZ)	31	Spun off	34
Ret	51	(New Zealand) Greg Murphy	Paul Weel Racing	Holden Commodore (VZ)	30	Engine	16
Ret	75	(Australia) Anthony Tratt	Paul Little Racing	Holden Commodore (VY)	14	Engine	25
Ret	21	(Australia) Brad Jones	Brad Jones Racing	Ford Falcon (BA)	8	Oil pressure	30
Ret	9	(Australia) Russell Ingall	Stone Brothers Racing	Ford Falcon (BA)	0	Battery	4
Fastest Lap: Garth Tander (HSV Dealer Team) - 1:10.4658 on lap 9

== Championship standings ==
Pos.	No	Driver	Team	Pts
1	1	(Australia) Marcos Ambrose	Stone Brothers Racing	980
2	11	(New Zealand) Steven Richards	Perkins Engineering	893
3	9	(Australia) Russell Ingall	Stone Brothers Racing	877
4	22	(Australia) Todd Kelly	Holden Racing Team	870
5	2	(Australia) Mark Skaife	Holden Racing Team	828
