= 2005 V8 Supercars Eastern Creek round =

Motor race

(New South Wales) 2005 V8 Supercars Eastern Creek round
Event Information
- Round 4 of 13 in the 2005 V8 Supercar Championship Series
- Date: 27–29 May 2005
- Location: Eastern Creek, New South Wales
- Venue: Eastern Creek Raceway
- Weather: Fine

Results
Race 1
Distance	36 laps	150 km
Pole position	Craig Lowndes; Triple Eight Race Engineering	1:31.5010
Winner	Marcos Ambrose; Stone Brothers Racing	01:00:28.5261
Race 2
Distance	36 laps	150 km
Winner	Craig Lowndes; Triple Eight Race Engineering	01:01:46.3894
Round Results
First	Craig Lowndes; Triple Eight Race Engineering	189 pts
Second	Marcos Ambrose; Stone Brothers Racing	189 pts
Third	Greg Murphy; Paul Weel Racing	177 pts

The 2005 V8 Supercars Eastern Creek round was the fourth round of the 2005 V8 Supercar Championship Series. It was held on the weekend of 27 to 29 May at the Eastern Creek International Raceway in Sydney, New South Wales.

Craig Lowndes took pole position and won the second race of the weekend en route to taking overall round honours. Marcos Ambrose won the opening race of the weekend and was embroiled in controversy after a collision with rival Mark Skaife while battling for the lead. Despite the incident compromising Skaife's race, Ambrose would not be punished for the contact with the stewards deeming it to be a racing incident.

== Background ==
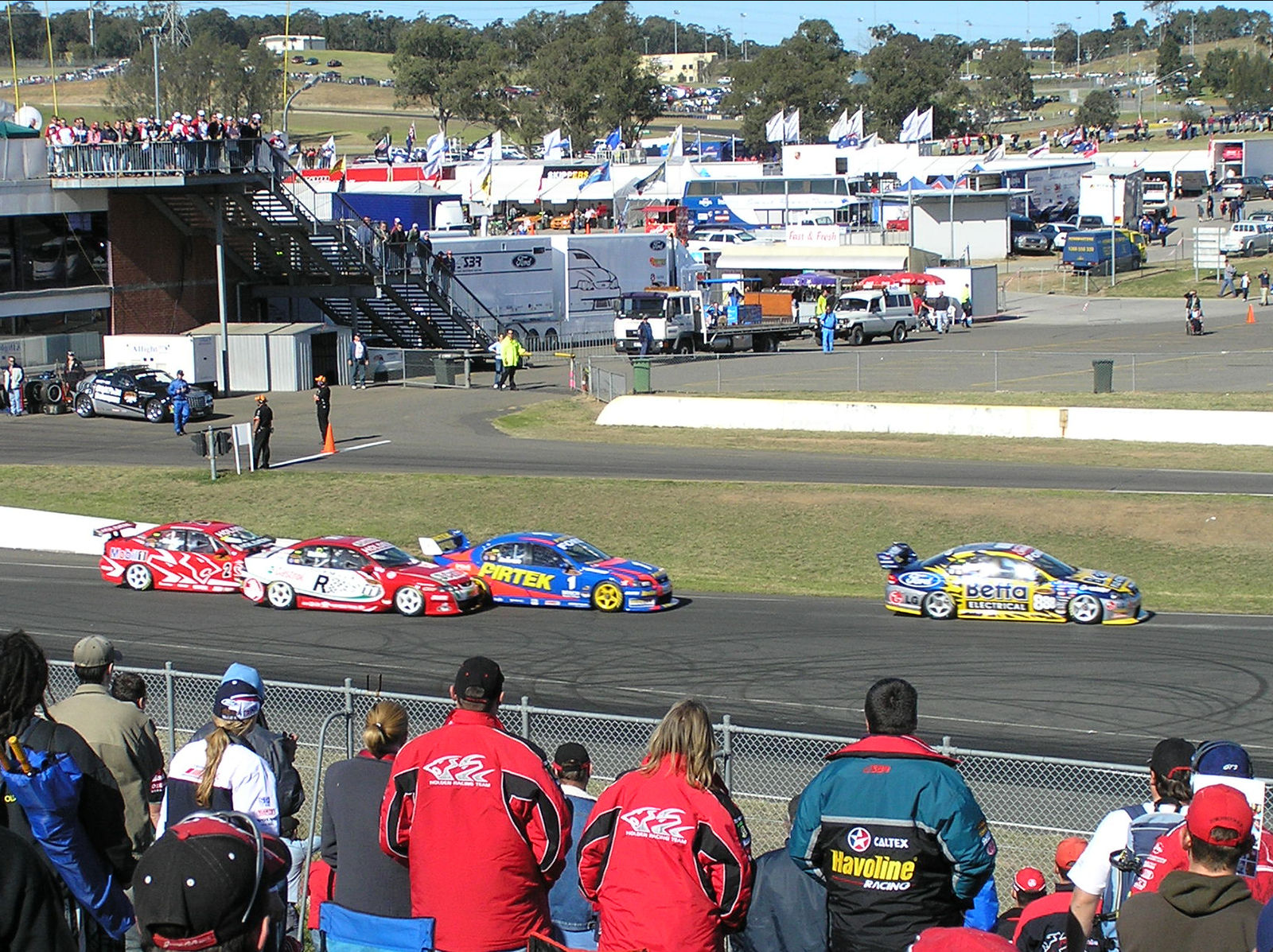
The start of race one

The event was held on the weekend of 27 to 29 May 2005. It was the 12th ATCC/V8 Supercar event to be held at Eastern Creek International Raceway and consisted of two 150 km races with compulsory pitstops in each.

=== Entry list ===
There were 34 drivers entered into the event. It featured mixture of vehicle models - sixteen BA Falcon's, six VY Commodore's, and twelve VZ Commodore's.

Alex Davison returned to Rod Nash Racing, replacing Paul Dumbrell who himself returned to Perkins Engineering. Steve Owen returned to the championship with Britek Motorsport after having last competed in the Adelaide 500.

== Race report ==
=== Qualifying ===
Pos	No	Driver	Team	Vehicle	Time
1	2	(Australia) Mark Skaife	Holden Racing Team	Holden Commodore (VZ)	1:31.7311
2	1	(Australia) Marcos Ambrose	Stone Brothers Racing	Ford Falcon (BA)	1:31.7517
3	9	(Australia) Russell Ingall	Stone Brothers Racing	Ford Falcon (BA)	1:31.8599
4	11	(New Zealand) Steven Richards	Perkins Engineering	Holden Commodore (VY)	1:31.9351
5	51	(New Zealand) Greg Murphy	Paul Weel Racing	Holden Commodore (VZ)	1:31.9909
6	888	(Australia) Craig Lowndes	Triple Eight Race Engineering	Ford Falcon (BA)	1:32.0484
7	16	(Australia) Garth Tander	HSV Dealer Team	Holden Commodore (VZ)	1:32.2299
8	3	(New Zealand) Jason Richards	Tasman Motorsport	Holden Commodore (VZ)	1:32.3509
9	6	(Australia) Jason Bright	Ford Performance Racing	Ford Falcon (BA)	1:32.3815
10	22	(Australia) Todd Kelly	Holden Racing Team	Holden Commodore (VZ)	1:32.4880
11	67	(Australia) Paul Morris	Paul Morris Motorsport	Holden Commodore (VZ)	1:32.4946
12	88	(Australia) Steven Ellery	Triple Eight Race Engineering	Ford Falcon (BA)	1:32.4977
13	45	(Brazil) Max Wilson	Team Dynamik	Holden Commodore (VZ)	1:32.5871
14	44	(New Zealand) Simon Wills	Team Dynamik	Holden Commodore (VZ)	1:32.6058
15	24	(Australia) Paul Dumbrell	Perkins Engineering	Holden Commodore (VY)	1:32.6614
16	021	(New Zealand) Paul Radisich	Team Kiwi Racing	Holden Commodore (VZ)	1:32.6884
17	50	(Australia) Paul Weel	Paul Weel Racing	Holden Commodore (VZ)	1:32.7166
18	12	(Australia) John Bowe	Brad Jones Racing	Ford Falcon (BA)	1:32.7348
19	5	(Australia) Greg Ritter	Ford Performance Racing	Ford Falcon (BA)	1:32.8002
20	33	(Australia) Cameron McConville	Garry Rogers Motorsport	Holden Commodore (VZ)	1:32.8022
21	15	(Australia) Rick Kelly	HSV Dealer Team	Holden Commodore (VZ)	1:32.9337
22	23	(Australia) Jamie Whincup	Tasman Motorsport	Holden Commodore (VZ)	1:32.9488
23	17	(Australia) Steven Johnson	Dick Johnson Racing	Ford Falcon (BA)	1:32.9652
24	20	(Australia) Mark Winterbottom	Larkham Motorsport	Ford Falcon (BA)	1:32.9684
25	10	(Australia) Jason Bargwanna	Larkham Motorsport	Ford Falcon (BA)	1:33.0441
26	18	(Australia) Glenn Seton	Dick Johnson Racing	Ford Falcon (BA)	1:33.1204
27	8	(New Zealand) Craig Baird	WPS Racing	Ford Falcon (BA)	1:33.3075
28	21	(Australia) Brad Jones	Brad Jones Racing	Ford Falcon (BA)	1:33.4334
29	52	(Australia) Matthew White	Britek Motorsport	Ford Falcon (BA)	1:33.4993
30	7	(Australia) Alex Davison	Rod Nash Racing	Holden Commodore (VZ)	1:33.5942
31	75	(Australia) Anthony Tratt	Paul Little Racing	Holden Commodore (VY)	1:33.7419
32	34	(Australia) Andrew Jones	Garry Rogers Motorsport	Holden Commodore (VZ)	1:33.7651
33	25	(Australia) Steve Owen	Britek Motorsport	Ford Falcon (BA)	1:36.2929
105% time - 1:36.3177
-	48	(Australia) David Besnard	WPS Racing	Ford Falcon (BA)	no time

=== Top ten shootout ===
Pos	No	Driver	Team	Vehicle	Time
1	888	(Australia) Craig Lowndes	Triple Eight Race Engineering	Ford Falcon (BA)	1:31.5010
2	2	(Australia) Mark Skaife	Holden Racing Team	Holden Commodore (VZ)	1:31.6658
3	1	(Australia) Marcos Ambrose	Stone Brothers Racing	Ford Falcon (BA)	1:31.7278
4	11	(New Zealand) Steven Richards	Perkins Engineering	Holden Commodore (VY)	1:31.8373
5	16	(Australia) Garth Tander	HSV Dealer Team	Holden Commodore (VZ)	1:31.8654
6	9	(Australia) Russell Ingall	Stone Brothers Racing	Ford Falcon (BA)	1:31.8736
7	51	(New Zealand) Greg Murphy	Paul Weel Racing	Holden Commodore (VZ)	1:31.9332
8	22	(Australia) Todd Kelly	Holden Racing Team	Holden Commodore (VZ)	1:32.4283
9	6	(Australia) Jason Bright	Ford Performance Racing	Ford Falcon (BA)	1:32.9446
10	3	(New Zealand) Jason Richards	Tasman Motorsport	Holden Commodore (VZ)	no time

=== Race 1 ===
Pos.	No.	Driver	Team	Vehicle	Laps	Time/Retired	Grid
1	1	(Australia) Marcos Ambrose	Stone Brothers Racing	Ford Falcon (BA)	36	01:00:28.5261	3
2	888	(Australia) Craig Lowndes	Triple Eight Race Engineering	Ford Falcon (BA)	36	+ 6.463	1
3	11	(New Zealand) Steven Richards	Perkins Engineering	Holden Commodore (VY)	36	+ 23.984	4
4	51	(New Zealand) Greg Murphy	Paul Weel Racing	Holden Commodore (VZ)	36	+ 28.190	7
5	9	(Australia) Russell Ingall	Stone Brothers Racing	Ford Falcon (BA)	36	+ 28.464	6
6	22	(Australia) Todd Kelly	Holden Racing Team	Holden Commodore (VZ)	36	+ 28.778	8
7	2	(Australia) Mark Skaife	Holden Racing Team	Holden Commodore (VZ)	36	+ 31.255	2
8	88	(Australia) Steven Ellery	Triple Eight Race Engineering	Ford Falcon (BA)	36	+ 44.045	12
9	16	(Australia) Garth Tander	HSV Dealer Team	Holden Commodore (VZ)	36	+ 46.431	5
10	3	(New Zealand) Jason Richards	Tasman Motorsport	Holden Commodore (VZ)	36	+ 46.809	10
11	67	(Australia) Paul Morris	Paul Morris Motorsport	Holden Commodore (VZ)	36	+ 55.717	11
12	12	(Australia) John Bowe	Brad Jones Racing	Ford Falcon (BA)	36	+ 58.699	18
13	17	(Australia) Steven Johnson	Dick Johnson Racing	Ford Falcon (BA)	36	+ 1:00.073	23
14	21	(Australia) Brad Jones	Brad Jones Racing	Ford Falcon (BA)	36	+ 1:09.127	28
15	33	(Australia) Cameron McConville	Garry Rogers Motorsport	Holden Commodore (VZ)	36	+ 1:09.574	20
16	24	(Australia) Paul Dumbrell	Perkins Engineering	Holden Commodore (VY)	36	+ 1:12.544	15
17	10	(Australia) Jason Bargwanna	Larkham Motorsport	Ford Falcon (BA)	36	+ 1:18.733	25
18	5	(Australia) Greg Ritter	Ford Performance Racing	Ford Falcon (BA)	36	+ 1:21.959	19
19	25	(Australia) Steve Owen	Britek Motorsport	Ford Falcon (BA)	36	+ 1:23.136	33
20	18	(Australia) Glenn Seton	Dick Johnson Racing	Ford Falcon (BA)	36	+ 1:23.272	26
21	8	(New Zealand) Craig Baird	WPS Racing	Ford Falcon (BA)	36	+ 1:23.704	27
22	52	(Australia) Matthew White	Britek Motorsport	Ford Falcon (BA)	36	+ 1:24.304	29
23	20	(Australia) Mark Winterbottom	Larkham Motorsport	Ford Falcon (BA)	36	+ 1:24.606	24
24	23	(Australia) Jamie Whincup	Tasman Motorsport	Holden Commodore (VZ)	36	+ 1:24.873	22
25	75	(Australia) Anthony Tratt	Paul Little Racing	Holden Commodore (VY)	36	+ 1:30.614	31
26	45	(Brazil) Max Wilson	Team Dynamik	Holden Commodore (VZ)	36	+ 1:31.062	13
27	50	(Australia) Paul Weel	Paul Weel Racing	Holden Commodore (VZ)	36	+ 1:32.119	17
28	34	(Australia) Andrew Jones	Garry Rogers Motorsport	Holden Commodore (VZ)	35	+ 1 lap	32
29	7	(Australia) Alex Davison	Rod Nash Racing	Holden Commodore (VZ)	35	+ 1 lap	30
30	48	(Australia) David Besnard	WPS Racing	Ford Falcon (BA)	35	+ 1 lap	34
31	15	(Australia) Rick Kelly	HSV Dealer Team	Holden Commodore (VZ)	35	+ 1 lap	21
32	021	(New Zealand) Paul Radisich	Team Kiwi Racing	Holden Commodore (VZ)	35	+ 1 lap	16
33	6	(Australia) Jason Bright	Ford Performance Racing	Ford Falcon (BA)	35	+ 1 lap	9
34	44	(New Zealand) Simon Wills	Team Dynamik	Holden Commodore (VZ)	29	+ 7 laps	14
Fastest Lap: Craig Lowndes (Triple Eight Race Engineering) - 1:32.8516 on lap 8

=== Race 2 ===
Pos.	No.	Driver	Team	Vehicle	Laps	Time/Retired	Grid
1	888	(Australia) Craig Lowndes	Triple Eight Race Engineering	Ford Falcon (BA)	36	01:01:46.3894	2
2	1	(Australia) Marcos Ambrose	Stone Brothers Racing	Ford Falcon (BA)	36	+ 2.017	1
3	51	(New Zealand) Greg Murphy	Paul Weel Racing	Holden Commodore (VZ)	36	+ 2.257	4
4	22	(Australia) Todd Kelly	Holden Racing Team	Holden Commodore (VZ)	36	+ 8.093	6
5	11	(New Zealand) Steven Richards	Perkins Engineering	Holden Commodore (VY)	36	+ 9.276	3
6	9	(Australia) Russell Ingall	Stone Brothers Racing	Ford Falcon (BA)	36	+ 9.736	5
7	2	(Australia) Mark Skaife	Holden Racing Team	Holden Commodore (VZ)	36	+ 13.816	7
8	12	(Australia) John Bowe	Brad Jones Racing	Ford Falcon (BA)	36	+ 18.412	12
9	17	(Australia) Steven Johnson	Dick Johnson Racing	Ford Falcon (BA)	36	+ 18.699	13
10	16	(Australia) Garth Tander	HSV Dealer Team	Holden Commodore (VZ)	36	+ 19.748	9
11	21	(Australia) Brad Jones	Brad Jones Racing	Ford Falcon (BA)	36	+ 20.339	14
12	3	(New Zealand) Jason Richards	Tasman Motorsport	Holden Commodore (VZ)	36	+ 20.732	10
13	33	(Australia) Cameron McConville	Garry Rogers Motorsport	Holden Commodore (VZ)	36	+ 21.537	15
14	15	(Australia) Rick Kelly	HSV Dealer Team	Holden Commodore (VZ)	36	+ 29.732	31
15	23	(Australia) Jamie Whincup	Tasman Motorsport	Holden Commodore (VZ)	36	+ 29.951	24
16	45	(Brazil) Max Wilson	Team Dynamik	Holden Commodore (VZ)	36	+ 30.132	26
17	8	(New Zealand) Craig Baird	WPS Racing	Ford Falcon (BA)	36	+ 32.331	21
18	021	(New Zealand) Paul Radisich	Team Kiwi Racing	Holden Commodore (VZ)	36	+ 32.621	32
19	52	(Australia) Matthew White	Britek Motorsport	Ford Falcon (BA)	36	+ 43.166	22
20	44	(New Zealand) Simon Wills	Team Dynamik	Holden Commodore (VZ)	36	+ 45.130	34
21	10	(Australia) Jason Bargwanna	Larkham Motorsport	Ford Falcon (BA)	36	+ 46.163	17
22	25	(Australia) Steve Owen	Britek Motorsport	Ford Falcon (BA)	36	+ 57.016	19
23	6	(Australia) Jason Bright	Ford Performance Racing	Ford Falcon (BA)	36	+ 1:04.954	33
24	48	(Australia) David Besnard	WPS Racing	Ford Falcon (BA)	36	+ 1:31.737	30
25	7	(Australia) Alex Davison	Rod Nash Racing	Holden Commodore (VZ)	35	+ 1 lap	29
26	50	(Australia) Paul Weel	Paul Weel Racing	Holden Commodore (VZ)	35	+ 1 lap	27
27	18	(Australia) Glenn Seton	Dick Johnson Racing	Ford Falcon (BA)	35	+ 1 lap	20
28	88	(Australia) Steven Ellery	Triple Eight Race Engineering	Ford Falcon (BA)	34	+ 2 laps	8
Ret	75	(Australia) Anthony Tratt	Paul Little Racing	Holden Commodore (VY)	35	Retired	25
Ret	20	(Australia) Mark Winterbottom	Larkham Motorsport	Ford Falcon (BA)	35	Retired	23
Ret	34	(Australia) Andrew Jones	Garry Rogers Motorsport	Holden Commodore (VZ)	35	Retired	28
Ret	67	(Australia) Paul Morris	Paul Morris Motorsport	Holden Commodore (VZ)	19	Retired	11
Ret	5	(Australia) Greg Ritter	Ford Performance Racing	Ford Falcon (BA)	12	Retired	18
Ret	24	(Australia) Paul Dumbrell	Perkins Engineering	Holden Commodore (VY)	2	Retired	16
Fastest Lap: Craig Lowndes (Triple Eight Race Engineering) - 1:32.9370 on lap 2

== Championship standings ==
Pos.	No	Driver	Team	Pts
1	1	(Australia) Marcos Ambrose	Stone Brothers Racing	708
2	9	(Australia) Russell Ingall	Stone Brothers Racing	673
3	11	(New Zealand) Steven Richards	Perkins Engineering	585
4	888	(Australia) Craig Lowndes	Triple Eight Race Engineering	554
5	2	(Australia) Mark Skaife	Holden Racing Team	546
