= 2005 Queensland 300 =

Motor race

Event Information
- Round 7 of 13 in the 2005 V8 Supercar Championship Series
- Date: 22–24 July 2005
- Location: Ipswich, Queensland
- Venue: Queensland Raceway
- Weather: Sunny

Results
Race 1
Distance	90 laps	300 km
Pole position	Marcos Ambrose; Stone Brothers Racing	1:10.2173
Winner	Craig Lowndes; Triple Eight Race Engineering	01:57:29.6514
Round Results
First	Craig Lowndes; Triple Eight Race Engineering	192 pts
Second	Marcos Ambrose; Stone Brothers Racing	186 pts
Third	Garth Tander; HSV Dealer Team	180 pts

The 2005 Queensland 300 was the seventh round of the 2005 V8 Supercar Championship Series. It was held on the weekend of 22 to 24 July at Queensland Raceway in Ipswich, Queensland.

Craig Lowndes took victory for the second time in 2005 and claimed his first round win in the process after leading the race from pole position. Championship leader Marcos Ambrose claimed provisional pole position and closely followed Lowndes for most of the race but was ultimately unable to rein him in.

The race was also notable for a major crash for Jason Richards. After incurring contact with Paul Morris, his car struck a raised kerb sideways and sent his car into a series of rollovers. The crash mirrored that of a Porsche Carrera Cup incident involving Cameron McLean earlier that day.

== Background ==
The event was held on the weekend of 22 to 24 July 2005. It was the fifth V8 Supercar event to be held at Queensland Raceway in the sprint format and consisted of one 300 km race with two compulsory pitstops for fuel and tyres.

=== Entry list ===
There were 34 drivers entered into the event which included fifteen BA Ford Falcon's, fifteen VZ Holden Commodore's and two VY Holden Commodore's.

== Race report ==
=== Qualifying ===
Pos.	No.	Driver	Team	Vehicle	Time
1	1	(Australia) Marcos Ambrose	Stone Brothers Racing	Ford Falcon (BA)	1:10.3557
2	16	(Australia) Garth Tander	HSV Dealer Team	Holden Commodore (VZ)	1:10.4841
3	9	(Australia) Russell Ingall	Stone Brothers Racing	Ford Falcon (BA)	1:10.4965
4	2	(Australia) Mark Skaife	Holden Racing Team	Holden Commodore (VZ)	1:10.5235
5	22	(Australia) Todd Kelly	Holden Racing Team	Holden Commodore (VZ)	1:10.5456
6	888	(Australia) Craig Lowndes	Triple Eight Race Engineering	Ford Falcon (BA)	1:10.5942
7	11	(New Zealand) Steven Richards	Perkins Engineering	Holden Commodore (VZ)	1:10.6398
8	45	(Brazil) Max Wilson	Team Dynamik	Holden Commodore (VZ)	1:10.6953
9	51	(New Zealand) Greg Murphy	Paul Weel Racing	Holden Commodore (VZ)	1:10.7595
10	88	(Australia) Steven Ellery	Triple Eight Race Engineering	Ford Falcon (BA)	1:10.8325
11	15	(Australia) Rick Kelly	HSV Dealer Team	Holden Commodore (VZ)	1:10.8406
12	20	(Australia) Mark Winterbottom	Larkham Motorsport	Ford Falcon (BA)	1:10.8627
13	17	(Australia) Steven Johnson	Dick Johnson Racing	Ford Falcon (BA)	1:10.8675
14	6	(Australia) Jason Bright	Ford Performance Racing	Ford Falcon (BA)	1:10.8952
15	021	(New Zealand) Paul Radisich	Team Kiwi Racing	Holden Commodore (VZ)	1:10.9095
16	10	(Australia) Jason Bargwanna	Larkham Motorsport	Ford Falcon (BA)	1:10.9142
17	67	(Australia) Paul Morris	Paul Morris Motorsport	Holden Commodore (VZ)	1:10.9665
18	48	(Australia) David Besnard	WPS Racing	Ford Falcon (BA)	1:10.9924
19	18	(Australia) Glenn Seton	Dick Johnson Racing	Ford Falcon (BA)	1:11.0108
20	44	(New Zealand) Simon Wills	Team Dynamik	Holden Commodore (VZ)	1:11.0617
21	5	(Australia) Greg Ritter	Ford Performance Racing	Ford Falcon (BA)	1:11.0667
22	3	(New Zealand) Jason Richards	Tasman Motorsport	Holden Commodore (VZ)	1:11.0842
23	50	(Australia) Paul Weel	Paul Weel Racing	Holden Commodore (VZ)	1:11.1154
24	23	(Australia) Jamie Whincup	Tasman Motorsport	Holden Commodore (VZ)	1:11.1369
25	24	(Australia) Paul Dumbrell	Perkins Engineering	Holden Commodore (VY)	1:11.1629
26	52	(Australia) Matthew White	Britek Motorsport	Ford Falcon (BA)	1:11.2558
27	8	(New Zealand) Craig Baird	WPS Racing	Ford Falcon (BA)	1:11.3110
28	12	(Australia) John Bowe	Brad Jones Racing	Ford Falcon (BA)	1:11.3344
29	21	(Australia) Brad Jones	Brad Jones Racing	Ford Falcon (BA)	1:11.3858
30	33	(Australia) Cameron McConville	Garry Rogers Motorsport	Holden Commodore (VZ)	1:11.3924
31	25	(Australia) Steve Owen	Britek Motorsport	Ford Falcon (BA)	1:11.4016
32	34	(Australia) Andrew Jones	Garry Rogers Motorsport	Holden Commodore (VZ)	1:11.4056
33	7	(Australia) Alex Davison	Rod Nash Racing	Holden Commodore (VZ)	1:11.4459
34	75	(Australia) Anthony Tratt	Paul Little Racing	Holden Commodore (VY)	1:11.8628
105% time - 1:13.8735

=== Top ten shootout ===
Pos.	No.	Driver	Team	Vehicle	Time
1	1	(Australia) Marcos Ambrose	Stone Brothers Racing	Ford Falcon (BA)	1:10.2173
2	888	(Australia) Craig Lowndes	Triple Eight Race Engineering	Ford Falcon (BA)	1:10.3290
3	9	(Australia) Russell Ingall	Stone Brothers Racing	Ford Falcon (BA)	1:10.5096
4	22	(Australia) Todd Kelly	Holden Racing Team	Holden Commodore (VZ)	1:10.5831
5	11	(New Zealand) Steven Richards	Perkins Engineering	Holden Commodore (VZ)	1:10.5991
6	2	(Australia) Mark Skaife	Holden Racing Team	Holden Commodore (VZ)	1:10.6147
7	88	(Australia) Steven Ellery	Triple Eight Race Engineering	Ford Falcon (BA)	1:10.6799
8	16	(Australia) Garth Tander	HSV Dealer Team	Holden Commodore (VZ)	1:10.8525
9	51	(New Zealand) Greg Murphy	Paul Weel Racing	Holden Commodore (VZ)	1:11.1100
10	45	(Brazil) Max Wilson	Team Dynamik	Holden Commodore (VZ)	1:11.4790

=== Race ===
Pos	No	Driver	Team	Car	Laps	Time/Retired	Grid
1	888	(Australia) Craig Lowndes	Triple Eight Race Engineering	Ford Falcon (BA)	90	01:57:29.6514	2
2	1	(Australia) Marcos Ambrose	Stone Brothers Racing	Ford Falcon (BA)	90	+ 2.801	1
3	16	(Australia) Garth Tander	HSV Dealer Team	Holden Commodore (VZ)	90	+ 5.446	8
4	9	(Australia) Russell Ingall	Stone Brothers Racing	Ford Falcon (BA)	90	+ 5.974	3
5	11	(New Zealand) Steven Richards	Perkins Engineering	Holden Commodore (VY)	90	+ 6.642	5
6	22	(Australia) Todd Kelly	Holden Racing Team	Holden Commodore (VZ)	90	+ 10.502	4
7	88	(Australia) Steven Ellery	Triple Eight Race Engineering	Ford Falcon (BA)	90	+ 11.499	7
8	51	(New Zealand) Greg Murphy	Paul Weel Racing	Holden Commodore (VZ)	90	+ 14.773	9
9	6	(Australia) Jason Bright	Ford Performance Racing	Ford Falcon (BA)	90	+ 15.128	14
10	17	(Australia) Steven Johnson	Dick Johnson Racing	Ford Falcon (BA)	90	+ 17.467	13
11	18	(Australia) Glenn Seton	Dick Johnson Racing	Ford Falcon (BA)	90	+ 17.963	19
12	2	(Australia) Mark Skaife	Holden Racing Team	Holden Commodore (VZ)	90	+ 18.560	6
13	48	(Australia) David Besnard	WPS Racing	Ford Falcon (BA)	90	+ 18.784	18
14	45	(Brazil) Max Wilson	Team Dynamik	Holden Commodore (VZ)	90	+ 18.898	10
15	15	(Australia) Rick Kelly	HSV Dealer Team	Holden Commodore (VZ)	90	+ 20.644	11
16	8	(New Zealand) Craig Baird	WPS Racing	Ford Falcon (BA)	90	+ 21.006	27
17	33	(Australia) Cameron McConville	Garry Rogers Motorsport	Holden Commodore (VZ)	90	+ 21.790	30
18	24	(Australia) Paul Dumbrell	Perkins Engineering	Holden Commodore (VY)	90	+ 22.333	25
19	10	(Australia) Jason Bargwanna	Larkham Motorsport	Ford Falcon (BA)	90	+ 22.870	16
20	21	(Australia) Brad Jones	Brad Jones Racing	Ford Falcon (BA)	90	+ 23.964	29
21	34	(Australia) Andrew Jones	Garry Rogers Motorsport	Holden Commodore (VZ)	90	+ 25.220	32
22	12	(Australia) John Bowe	Brad Jones Racing	Ford Falcon (BA)	90	+ 28.165	28
23	44	(New Zealand) Simon Wills	Team Dynamik	Holden Commodore (VZ)	90	+ 30.447	20
24	25	(Australia) Steve Owen	Britek Motorsport	Ford Falcon (BA)	89	+ 1 lap	31
25	20	(Australia) Mark Winterbottom	Larkham Motorsport	Ford Falcon (BA)	89	+ 1 lap	12
26	67	(Australia) Paul Morris	Paul Morris Motorsport	Holden Commodore (VZ)	89	+ 1 lap	17
27	52	(Australia) Matthew White	Britek Motorsport	Ford Falcon (BA)	85	+ 5 laps	26
28	23	(Australia) Jamie Whincup	Tasman Motorsport	Holden Commodore (VZ)	85	+ 5 laps	24
29	021	(New Zealand) Paul Radisich	Team Kiwi Racing	Holden Commodore (VZ)	85	+ 5 laps	15
Ret	75	(Australia) Anthony Tratt	Paul Little Racing	Holden Commodore (VY)	87	Retired	34
Ret	3	(New Zealand) Jason Richards	Tasman Motorsport	Holden Commodore (VZ)	42	Accident	22
Ret	50	(Australia) Paul Weel	Paul Weel Racing	Holden Commodore (VZ)	29	Retired	23
Ret	5	(Australia) Greg Ritter	Ford Performance Racing	Ford Falcon (BA)	12	Retired	21
Ret	7	(Australia) Alex Davison	Rod Nash Racing	Holden Commodore (VZ)	12	Retired	33
Fastest Lap: Marcos Ambrose (Stone Brothers Racing) - 1:11.1963 on lap 2

== Championship standings ==
Pos.	No	Driver	Team	Pts
1	1	(Australia) Marcos Ambrose	Stone Brothers Racing	1166
2	11	(New Zealand) Steven Richards	Perkins Engineering	1061
3	9	(Australia) Russell Ingall	Stone Brothers Racing	1051
4	22	(Australia) Todd Kelly	Holden Racing Team	1032
5	2	(Australia) Mark Skaife	Holden Racing Team	954
