= 2005 V8 Supercars China round =

Motor race

Event Information
- Round 5 of 13 in the 2005 V8 Supercar Championship Series
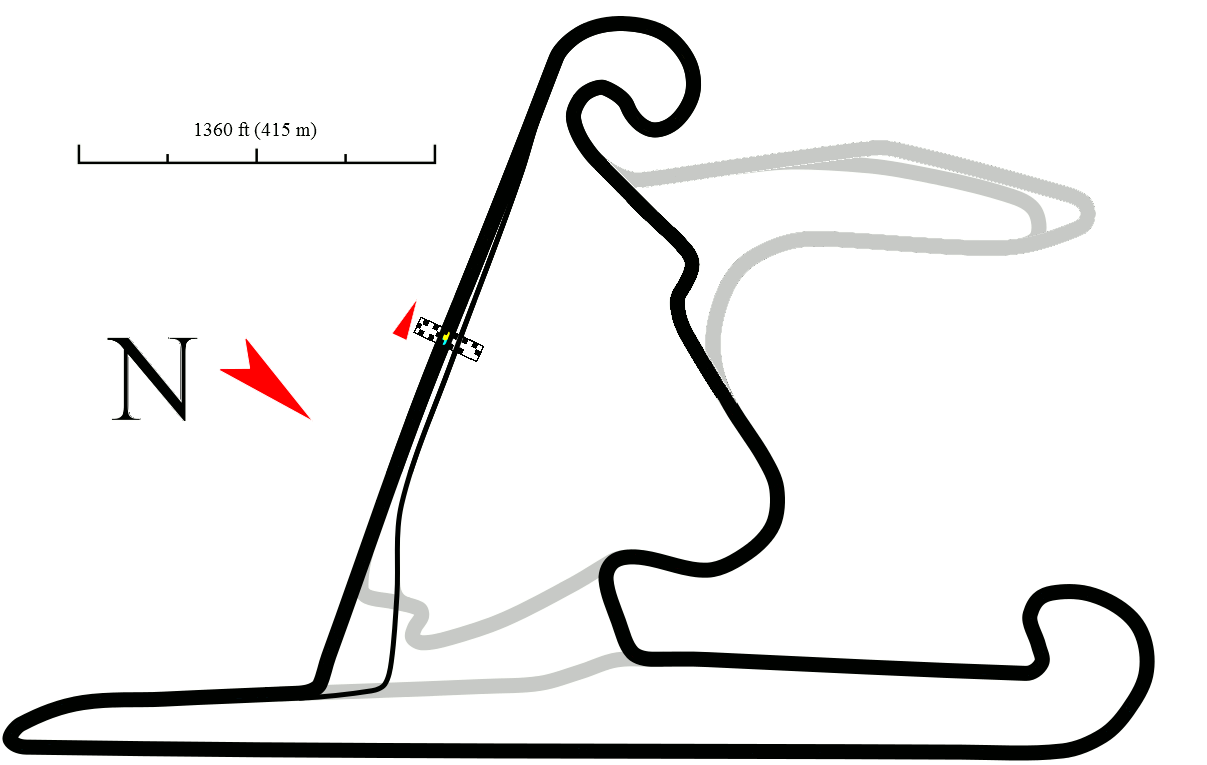
- Date: 10–12 June 2005
- Location: Shanghai, China
- Venue: Shanghai International Raceway
- Weather: Sunny

Results
Race 1
Distance	22 laps	100 km
Pole position	Mark Skaife; Holden Racing Team	1:49.8516
Winner	Todd Kelly; Holden Racing Team	41:49.4584
Race 2
Distance	30 laps	100 km
Winner	Mark Skaife; Holden Racing Team	56:55.5933
Race 3
Distance	30 laps	100 km
Winner	Todd Kelly; Holden Racing Team	59:32.3831
Round Results
First	Todd Kelly; Holden Racing Team	188 pts
Second	Steven Richards; Perkins Engineering	186 pts
Third	Paul Radisich; Team Kiwi Racing	170 pts

The 2005 V8 Supercars China round (known for sponsorship reasons as the 2005 Buick V8 Supercars China round) was the fifth round of the 2005 V8 Supercar Championship Series. It was held on the weekend of 10 to 12 June at the Shanghai International Circuit in Shanghai, China. This was the first championship event to take place outside of Australia and New Zealand and the only V8 Supercar event to have taken place in China.

After a tricky start to the season, the Holden Racing Team dominated the weekend with Todd Kelly taking pole position and winning two out of the three races to take overall round honours. Teammate Mark Skaife won the second race but was curtailed in race three after receiving a drive-through penalty for spinning Russell Ingall.

Championship leader Marcos Ambrose endured a tricky weekend as both Stone Brothers Racing cars struggled with car setup. Nevertheless, the defending champion retained the lead of the championship upon exiting the round, although though the strong performances of Kelly, Richards and Skaife allowed the Holden contingency to close the deficit.

== Background ==
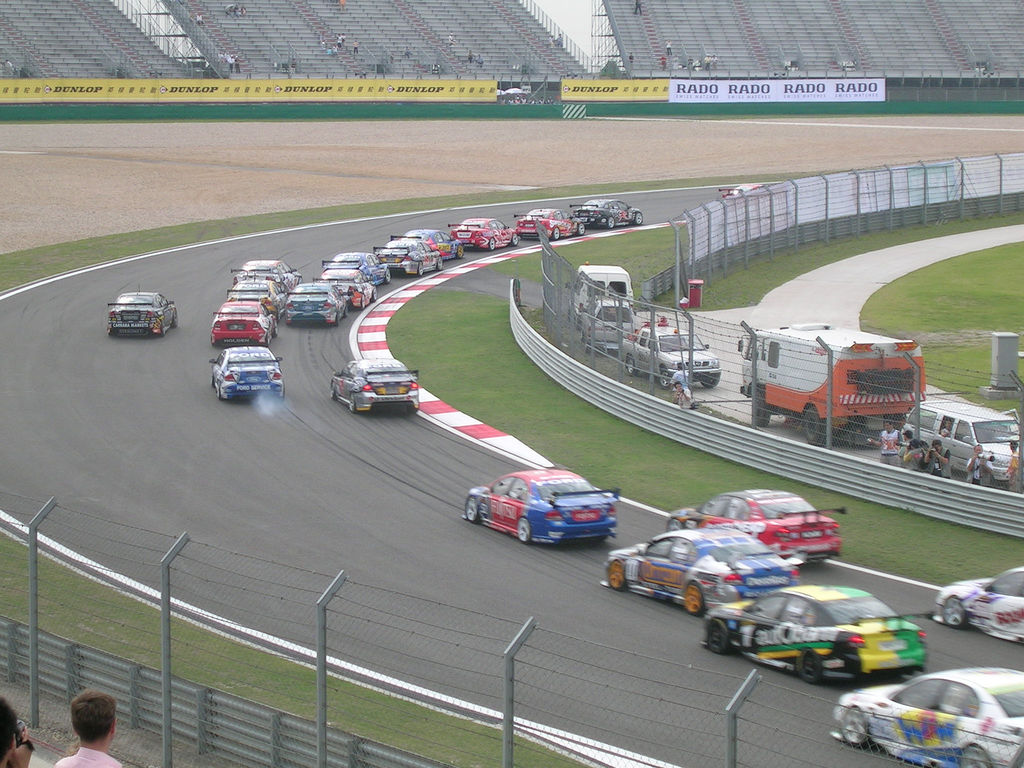
Race start in Shanghai.

The event was held on the weekend of 10 to 12 June 2005. It was the first V8 Supercar event to be held at the Shanghai International Circuit, the first to be held in China, and consisted of three 100 km races with compulsory pitstops in each.

The event was initially slated for a 2004 date by series chairman Tony Cochrane in early 2003, signaling the first time that V8 Supercars would race outside Australia and New Zealand. The event was eventually confirmed for June 2005, with several teams updating their liveries for the weekend, including the HSV Dealer Team entry of Rick Kelly rebranding as Team Buick for the weekend.

Two Boeing 747's were deputised by Gibson Freight to transport the cars to Shanghai, China at a total cost of almost $1 million AUD.

=== Entry list ===
There were 32 drivers entered into the event which included fifteen BA Ford Falcon's, fifteen VZ Holden Commodore's and two VY Holden Commodore's.

Multiple car liveries were altered ahead of this round. Triple Eight Race Engineering replaced Betta Electrical signage with LG due to Betta Electrical's lack of China locations. Rick Kelly of HSV Dealer Team had a new Buick livery as part of a General Motors promotional drive that included title sponsorship of the event. The Castrol Perkins Engineering cars featured Castrol GTX as opposed to Formula R due to branding differences between Australia and China. The Team Dynamik cars changed numbers to 168 for Simon Wills and 328 for Max Wilson. This was done in reference to Chinese culture, with 168 being a rough translation of 'fortune and prosperity all the way', and 328 being a rough translation of 'business prosperity' and 'good fortune'.

Paul Dumbrell replaced Alex Davison at Rod Nash Racing for this round.

== Race report ==
=== Qualifying ===
Mark Skaife secured provisional pole position by nearly four tenths ahead of Craig Lowndes. Despite suffering from an intermittent misfire, Jamie Whincup of Tasman Motorsport surprised the paddock by qualifying in sixth place provisionally. Teammate Jason Richards missed out on the shootout after Tasman Motorsport elected to conserve tyres for the remainder of the weekend. Paul Radisich of Team Kiwi Racing recovered from a turbulent round at Eastern Creek to qualify within the top ten.

Pos.	No.	Driver	Team	Vehicle	Time
1	2	(Australia) Mark Skaife	Holden Racing Team	Holden Commodore (VZ)	1:49.6053
2	888	(Australia) Craig Lowndes	Triple Eight Race Engineering	Ford Falcon (BA)	1:49.9893
3	51	(New Zealand) Greg Murphy	Paul Weel Racing	Holden Commodore (VZ)	1:50.0728
4	11	(New Zealand) Steven Richards	Perkins Engineering	Holden Commodore (VY)	1:50.1025
5	22	(Australia) Todd Kelly	Holden Racing Team	Holden Commodore (VZ)	1:50.1130
6	23	(Australia) Jamie Whincup	Tasman Motorsport	Holden Commodore (VZ)	1:50.1390
7	1	(Australia) Marcos Ambrose	Stone Brothers Racing	Ford Falcon (BA)	1:50.1556
8	6	(Australia) Jason Bright	Ford Performance Racing	Ford Falcon (BA)	1:50.2455
9	021	(New Zealand) Paul Radisich	Team Kiwi Racing	Holden Commodore (VZ)	1:50.2827
10	17	(Australia) Steven Johnson	Dick Johnson Racing	Ford Falcon (BA)	1:50.3578
11	3	(New Zealand) Jason Richards	Tasman Motorsport	Holden Commodore (VZ)	1:50.4020
12	16	(Australia) Garth Tander	HSV Dealer Team	Holden Commodore (VZ)	1:50.4474
13	9	(Australia) Russell Ingall	Stone Brothers Racing	Ford Falcon (BA)	1:50.5047
14	67	(Australia) Paul Morris	Paul Morris Motorsport	Holden Commodore (VZ)	1:50.5049
15	88	(Australia) Steven Ellery	Triple Eight Race Engineering	Ford Falcon (BA)	1:50.6092
16	5	(Australia) Greg Ritter	Ford Performance Racing	Ford Falcon (BA)	1:50.6176
17	50	(Australia) Paul Weel	Paul Weel Racing	Holden Commodore (VZ)	1:50.7469
18	10	(Australia) Jason Bargwanna	Larkham Motorsport	Ford Falcon (BA)	1:50.7699
19	168	(New Zealand) Simon Wills	Team Dynamik	Holden Commodore (VZ)	1:50.8376
20	52	(Australia) Matthew White	Britek Motorsport	Ford Falcon (BA)	1:50.8787
21	18	(Australia) Glenn Seton	Dick Johnson Racing	Ford Falcon (BA)	1:50.8925
22	7	(Australia) Paul Dumbrell	Rod Nash Racing	Holden Commodore (VZ)	1:51.0486
23	33	(Australia) Cameron McConville	Garry Rogers Motorsport	Holden Commodore (VZ)	1:51.1391
24	20	(Australia) Mark Winterbottom	Larkham Motorsport	Ford Falcon (BA)	1:51.1932
25	8	(New Zealand) Craig Baird	WPS Racing	Ford Falcon (BA)	1:51.3903
26	328	(Brazil) Max Wilson	Team Dynamik	Holden Commodore (VZ)	1:51.4577
27	48	(Australia) David Besnard	WPS Racing	Ford Falcon (BA)	1:51.6225
28	75	(Australia) Anthony Tratt	Paul Little Racing	Holden Commodore (VY)	1:51.6989
29	21	(Australia) Brad Jones	Brad Jones Racing	Ford Falcon (BA)	1:51.8063
30	12	(Australia) John Bowe	Brad Jones Racing	Ford Falcon (BA)	1:51.8184
31	34	(Australia) Andrew Jones	Garry Rogers Motorsport	Holden Commodore (VZ)	1:51.8677
32	15	(Australia) Rick Kelly	HSV Dealer Team	Holden Commodore (VZ)	1:52.0723

=== Top ten shootout ===
Mark Skaife successfully converted his provisional pole position in the shootout with him being the only driver to set a time in the 1 minute 49 second bracket. Jamie Whincup was excluded from the results after missing the pit exit release window.

Pos.	No.	Driver	Team	Vehicle	Time
1	2	(Australia) Mark Skaife	Holden Racing Team	Holden Commodore (VZ)	1:49.8516
2	11	(New Zealand) Steven Richards	Perkins Engineering	Holden Commodore (VY)	1:50.0360
3	51	(New Zealand) Greg Murphy	Paul Weel Racing	Holden Commodore (VZ)	1:50.0667
4	021	(New Zealand) Paul Radisich	Team Kiwi Racing	Holden Commodore (VZ)	1:50.1682
5	888	(Australia) Craig Lowndes	Triple Eight Race Engineering	Ford Falcon (BA)	1:50.1862
6	22	(Australia) Todd Kelly	Holden Racing Team	Holden Commodore (VZ)	1:50.2211
7	1	(Australia) Marcos Ambrose	Stone Brothers Racing	Ford Falcon (BA)	1:50.5851
8	6	(Australia) Jason Bright	Ford Performance Racing	Ford Falcon (BA)	1:50.7781
9	17	(Australia) Steven Johnson	Dick Johnson Racing	Ford Falcon (BA)	1:51.2731
EXC	23	(Australia) Jamie Whincup	Tasman Motorsport	Holden Commodore (VZ)	time excluded

=== Race 1 ===
Pos	No	Driver	Team	Car	Laps	Time/Retired	Grid
1	22	(Australia) Todd Kelly	Holden Racing Team	Holden Commodore (VZ)	22	41:49.4584	6
2	11	(New Zealand) Steven Richards	Perkins Engineering	Holden Commodore (VZ)	22	+ 1.102	2
3	2	(Australia) Mark Skaife	Holden Racing Team	Holden Commodore (VZ)	22	+ 3.994	1
4	888	(Australia) Craig Lowndes	Triple Eight Race Engineering	Ford Falcon (BA)	22	+ 4.377	5
5	1	(Australia) Marcos Ambrose	Stone Brothers Racing	Ford Falcon (BA)	22	+ 4.886	7
6	021	(New Zealand) Paul Radisich	Team Kiwi Racing	Holden Commodore (VZ)	22	+ 6.043	4
7	6	(Australia) Jason Bright	Ford Performance Racing	Ford Falcon (BA)	22	+ 9.838	8
8	3	(New Zealand) Jason Richards	Tasman Motorsport	Holden Commodore (VZ)	22	+ 11.723	11
9	23	(Australia) Jamie Whincup	Tasman Motorsport	Holden Commodore (VZ)	22	+ 13.132	10
10	51	(New Zealand) Greg Murphy	Paul Weel Racing	Holden Commodore (VZ)	22	+ 13.738	3
11	17	(Australia) Steven Johnson	Dick Johnson Racing	Ford Falcon (BA)	22	+ 13.934	9
12	16	(Australia) Garth Tander	HSV Dealer Team	Holden Commodore (VZ)	22	+ 19.124	12
13	9	(Australia) Russell Ingall	Stone Brothers Racing	Ford Falcon (BA)	22	+ 19.630	13
14	18	(Australia) Glenn Seton	Dick Johnson Racing	Ford Falcon (BA)	22	+ 21.356	21
15	88	(Australia) Steven Ellery	Triple Eight Race Engineering	Ford Falcon (BA)	22	+ 27.254	15
16	33	(Australia) Cameron McConville	Garry Rogers Motorsport	Holden Commodore (VZ)	22	+ 28.173	23
17	67	(Australia) Paul Morris	Paul Morris Motorsport	Holden Commodore (VZ)	22	+ 28.499	14
18	168	(New Zealand) Simon Wills	Team Dynamik	Holden Commodore (VZ)	22	+ 33.095	19
19	7	(Australia) Paul Dumbrell	Rod Nash Racing	Holden Commodore (VZ)	22	+ 39.784	22
20	50	(Australia) Paul Weel	Paul Weel Racing	Holden Commodore (VZ)	22	+ 41.641	17
21	10	(Australia) Jason Bargwanna	Larkham Motorsport	Ford Falcon (BA)	22	+ 45.997	18
22	12	(Australia) John Bowe	Brad Jones Racing	Ford Falcon (BA)	22	+ 46.794	30
23	5	(Australia) Greg Ritter	Ford Performance Racing	Ford Falcon (BA)	22	+ 46.962	16
24	8	(New Zealand) Craig Baird	WPS Racing	Ford Falcon (BA)	22	+ 47.593	25
25	21	(Australia) Brad Jones	Brad Jones Racing	Ford Falcon (BA)	22	+ 48.997	29
26	34	(Australia) Andrew Jones	Garry Rogers Motorsport	Holden Commodore (VZ)	22	+ 51.285	31
27	52	(Australia) Matthew White	Britek Motorsport	Ford Falcon (BA)	22	+ 1:00.663	20
28	75	(Australia) Anthony Tratt	Paul Little Racing	Holden Commodore (VY)	19	+ 3 laps	28
Ret	48	(Australia) David Besnard	WPS Racing	Ford Falcon (BA)	12	Accident damage	27
Ret	20	(Australia) Mark Winterbottom	Larkham Motorsport	Ford Falcon (BA)	12	Accident	24
Ret	328	(Brazil) Max Wilson	Team Dynamik	Holden Commodore (VZ)	6	Radiator	26
Ret	15	(Australia) Rick Kelly	HSV Dealer Team	Holden Commodore (VZ)	2	Clutch	32
Fastest Lap: Todd Kelly (Holden Racing Team) - 1:51.0737 on lap 11

=== Race 2 ===
Pos	No	Driver	Team	Car	Laps	Time/Retired	Grid
1	2	(Australia) Mark Skaife	Holden Racing Team	Holden Commodore (VZ)	30	56:55.5933	3
2	11	(New Zealand) Steven Richards	Perkins Engineering	Holden Commodore (VZ)	30	+ 2.689	2
3	22	(Australia) Todd Kelly	Holden Racing Team	Holden Commodore (VZ)	30	+ 3.013	1
4	1	(Australia) Marcos Ambrose	Stone Brothers Racing	Ford Falcon (BA)	30	+ 11.101	5
5	021	(New Zealand) Paul Radisich	Team Kiwi Racing	Holden Commodore (VZ)	30	+ 14.214	6
6	9	(Australia) Russell Ingall	Stone Brothers Racing	Ford Falcon (BA)	30	+ 17.731	13
7	18	(Australia) Glenn Seton	Dick Johnson Racing	Ford Falcon (BA)	30	+ 21.366	14
8	23	(Australia) Jamie Whincup	Tasman Motorsport	Holden Commodore (VZ)	30	+ 30.861	9
9	33	(Australia) Cameron McConville	Garry Rogers Motorsport	Holden Commodore (VZ)	30	+ 35.730	16
10	5	(Australia) Greg Ritter	Ford Performance Racing	Ford Falcon (BA)	30	+ 39.968	23
11	50	(Australia) Paul Weel	Paul Weel Racing	Holden Commodore (VZ)	30	+ 40.999	20
12	7	(Australia) Paul Dumbrell	Rod Nash Racing	Holden Commodore (VZ)	30	+ 42.357	19
13	168	(New Zealand) Simon Wills	Team Dynamik	Holden Commodore (VZ)	30	+ 44.388	18
14	328	(Brazil) Max Wilson	Team Dynamik	Holden Commodore (VZ)	30	+ 47.682	30
15	12	(Australia) John Bowe	Brad Jones Racing	Ford Falcon (BA)	30	+ 50.378	22
16	15	(Australia) Rick Kelly	HSV Dealer Team	Holden Commodore (VZ)	30	+ 58.145	31
17	21	(Australia) Brad Jones	Brad Jones Racing	Ford Falcon (BA)	30	+ 58.676	25
18	34	(Australia) Andrew Jones	Garry Rogers Motorsport	Holden Commodore (VZ)	30	+ 1:01.709	26
19	8	(New Zealand) Craig Baird	WPS Racing	Ford Falcon (BA)	30	+ 1:05.254	24
20	6	(Australia) Jason Bright	Ford Performance Racing	Ford Falcon (BA)	30	+ 1:05.506	7
21	16	(Australia) Garth Tander	HSV Dealer Team	Holden Commodore (VZ)	30	+ 1:12.223	12
22	67	(Australia) Paul Morris	Paul Morris Motorsport	Holden Commodore (VZ)	30	+ 1:21.653	17
23	52	(Australia) Matthew White	Britek Motorsport	Ford Falcon (BA)	30	+ 1:36.701	27
24	88	(Australia) Steven Ellery	Triple Eight Race Engineering	Ford Falcon (BA)	29	+ 1 lap	15
25	75	(Australia) Anthony Tratt	Paul Little Racing	Holden Commodore (VY)	27	+ 3 laps	28
26	17	(Australia) Steven Johnson	Dick Johnson Racing	Ford Falcon (BA)	25	+ 5 laps	11
Ret	48	(Australia) David Besnard	WPS Racing	Ford Falcon (BA)	21	Engine	29
Ret	10	(Australia) Jason Bargwanna	Larkham Motorsport	Ford Falcon (BA)	9	Engine	21
Ret	51	(New Zealand) Greg Murphy	Paul Weel Racing	Holden Commodore (VZ)	3	Oil pressure	10
Ret	888	(Australia) Craig Lowndes	Triple Eight Race Engineering	Ford Falcon (BA)	2	Clutch	4
Ret	3	(New Zealand) Jason Richards	Tasman Motorsport	Holden Commodore (VZ)	2	Accident damage	8
DNS	20	(Australia) Mark Winterbottom	Larkham Motorsport	Ford Falcon (BA)		Did not start	
Fastest Lap: Todd Kelly (Holden Racing Team) - 1:51.0557 on lap 10

=== Race 3 ===
Pos	No	Driver	Team	Car	Laps	Time/Retired	Grid
1	22	(Australia) Todd Kelly	Holden Racing Team	Holden Commodore (VZ)	30	59:32.3831	3
2	11	(New Zealand) Steven Richards	Perkins Engineering	Holden Commodore (VZ)	30	+ 1.242	2
3	021	(New Zealand) Paul Radisich	Team Kiwi Racing	Holden Commodore (VZ)	30	+ 1.906	5
4	23	(Australia) Jamie Whincup	Tasman Motorsport	Holden Commodore (VZ)	30	+ 2.212	8
5	328	(Brazil) Max Wilson	Team Dynamik	Holden Commodore (VZ)	30	+ 6.027	14
6	6	(Australia) Jason Bright	Ford Performance Racing	Ford Falcon (BA)	30	+ 8.953	20
7	51	(New Zealand) Greg Murphy	Paul Weel Racing	Holden Commodore (VZ)	30	+ 9.184	29
8	5	(Australia) Greg Ritter	Ford Performance Racing	Ford Falcon (BA)	30	+ 15.597	10
9	33	(Australia) Cameron McConville	Garry Rogers Motorsport	Holden Commodore (VZ)	30	+ 17.206	9
10	21	(Australia) Brad Jones	Brad Jones Racing	Ford Falcon (BA)	30	+ 20.377	17
11	7	(Australia) Paul Dumbrell	Rod Nash Racing	Holden Commodore (VZ)	30	+ 22.402	12
12	1	(Australia) Marcos Ambrose	Stone Brothers Racing	Ford Falcon (BA)	30	+ 26.031	4
13	10	(Australia) Jason Bargwanna	Larkham Motorsport	Ford Falcon (BA)	30	+ 34.783	28
14	12	(Australia) John Bowe	Brad Jones Racing	Ford Falcon (BA)	30	+ 35.193	15
15	8	(New Zealand) Craig Baird	WPS Racing	Ford Falcon (BA)	30	+ 45.084	19
16	75	(Australia) Anthony Tratt	Paul Little Racing	Holden Commodore (VY)	30	+ 46.352	25
17	34	(Australia) Andrew Jones	Garry Rogers Motorsport	Holden Commodore (VZ)	30	+ 47.599	18
18	52	(Australia) Matthew White	Britek Motorsport	Ford Falcon (BA)	30	+ 48.241	23
19	50	(Australia) Paul Weel	Paul Weel Racing	Holden Commodore (VZ)	30	+ 52.902	11
20	168	(New Zealand) Simon Wills	Team Dynamik	Holden Commodore (VZ)	30	+ 53.112	13
21	17	(Australia) Steven Johnson	Dick Johnson Racing	Ford Falcon (BA)	30	+ 54.651	26
22	16	(Australia) Garth Tander	HSV Dealer Team	Holden Commodore (VZ)	30	+ 1:00.775	21
23	2	(Australia) Mark Skaife	Holden Racing Team	Holden Commodore (VZ)	30	+ 1:34.376	1
24	18	(Australia) Glenn Seton	Dick Johnson Racing	Ford Falcon (BA)	29	+ 1 lap	7
25	67	(Australia) Paul Morris	Paul Morris Motorsport	Holden Commodore (VZ)	28	+ 2 laps	22
26	9	(Australia) Russell Ingall	Stone Brothers Racing	Ford Falcon (BA)	28	+ 2 laps	6
27	88	(Australia) Steven Ellery	Triple Eight Race Engineering	Ford Falcon (BA)	24	+ 6 laps	24
Ret	3	(New Zealand) Jason Richards	Tasman Motorsport	Holden Commodore (VZ)	17	Engine	31
Ret	15	(Australia) Rick Kelly	HSV Dealer Team	Holden Commodore (VZ)	5	Mechanical	16
Ret	48	(Australia) David Besnard	WPS Racing	Ford Falcon (BA)	4	Accident damage	27
Ret	888	(Australia) Craig Lowndes	Triple Eight Race Engineering	Ford Falcon (BA)	1	Accident damage	30
DNS	20	(Australia) Mark Winterbottom	Larkham Motorsport	Ford Falcon (BA)		Did not start	
Fastest Lap: Marcos Ambrose (Stone Brothers Racing) - 1:51.1012 on lap 13

== Championship standings ==
Pos.	No	Driver	Team	Pts
1	1	(Australia) Marcos Ambrose	Stone Brothers Racing	864
2	9	(Australia) Russell Ingall	Stone Brothers Racing	781
3	11	(New Zealand) Steven Richards	Perkins Engineering	771
4	2	(Australia) Mark Skaife	Holden Racing Team	690
5	22	(Australia) Todd Kelly	Holden Racing Team	680
