= 2005 V8 Supercar Championship Series =

Motor racing competition

The 2005 V8 Supercar Championship Series was a motor racing championship for V8 Supercars. The series, which was the seventh V8 Supercar Championship Series, began on 18 March 2005 in Adelaide and ended on 27 November at Phillip Island Grand Prix Circuit after 13 rounds. The 46th Australian Touring Car Championship title was awarded to the series winner, Russell Ingall by the Confederation of Australian Motor Sport.

== Teams and drivers ==
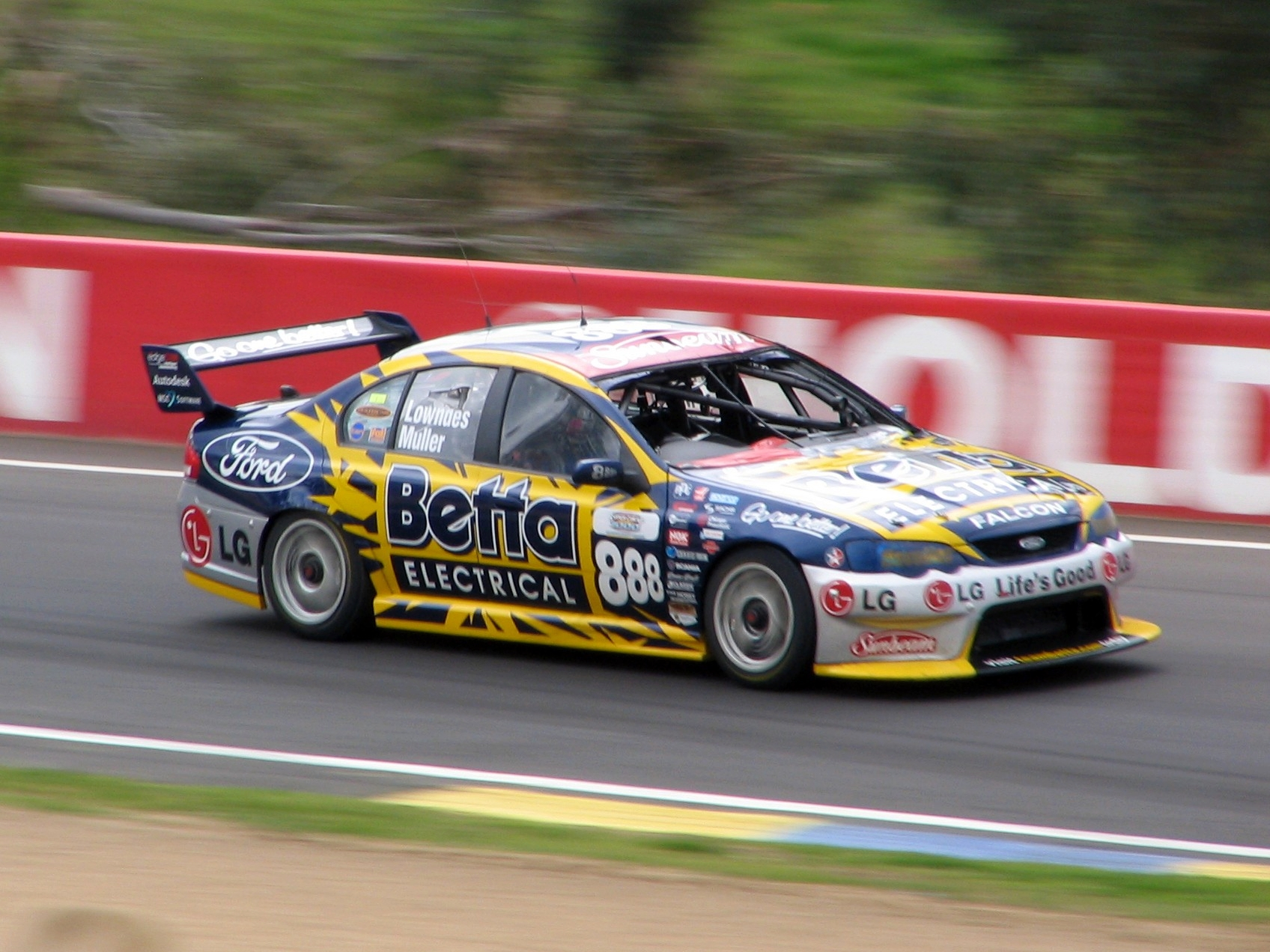
Craig Lowndes (Ford BA Falcon) placed second in the championship

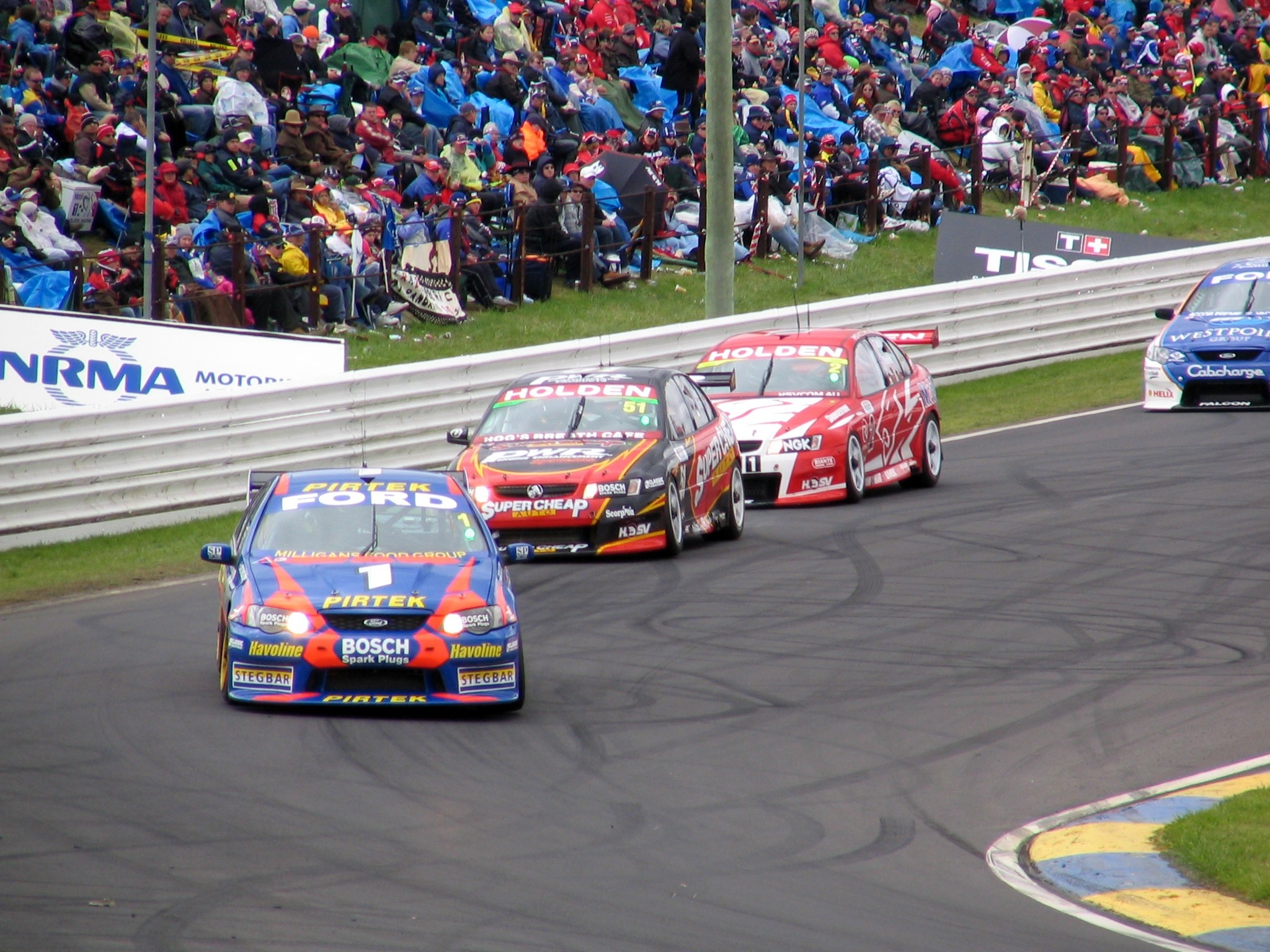
Marcos Ambrose (Ford BA Falcon) placed third in the championship

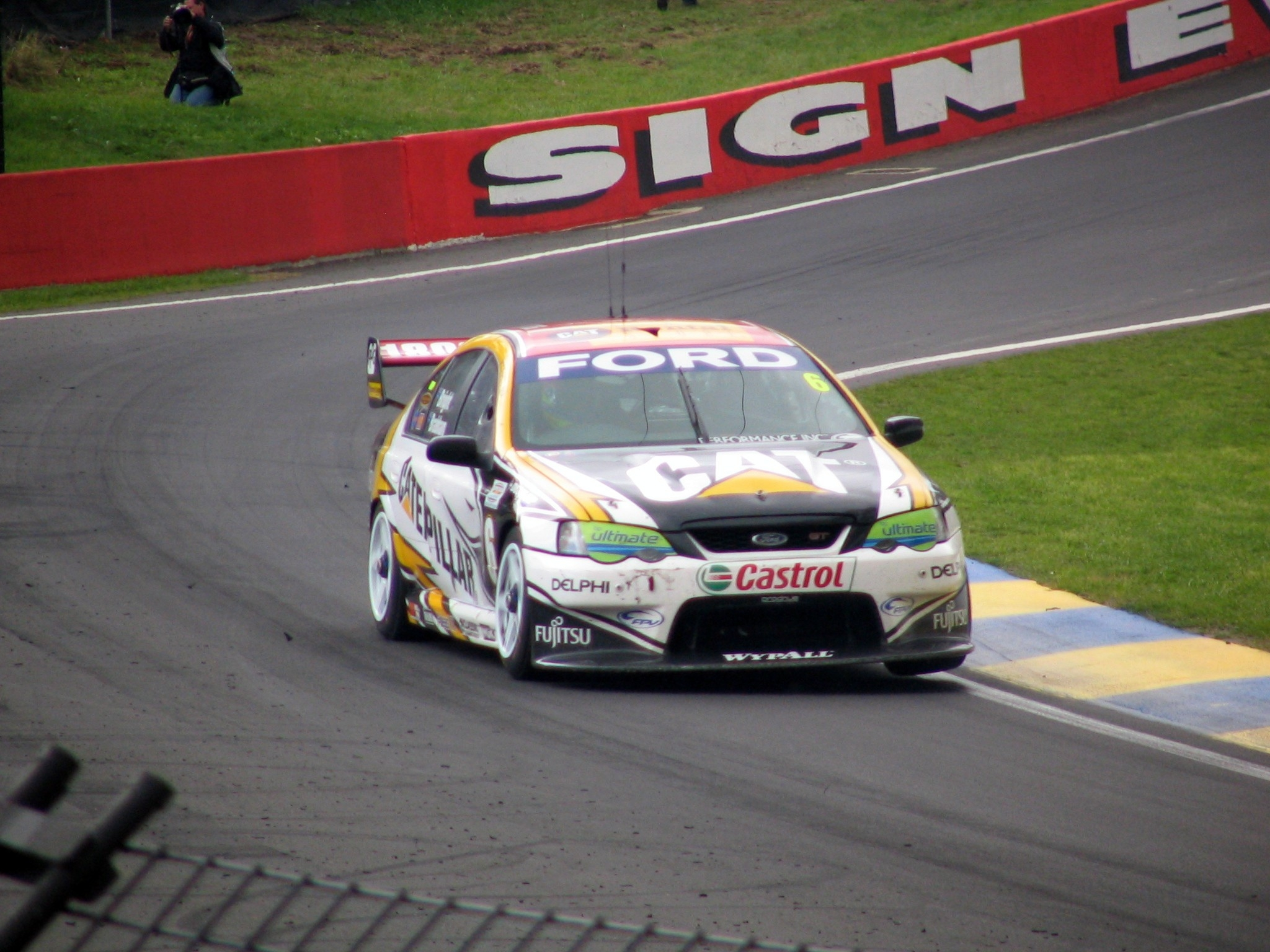
Jason Bright (Ford BA Falcon) placed ninth in the championship

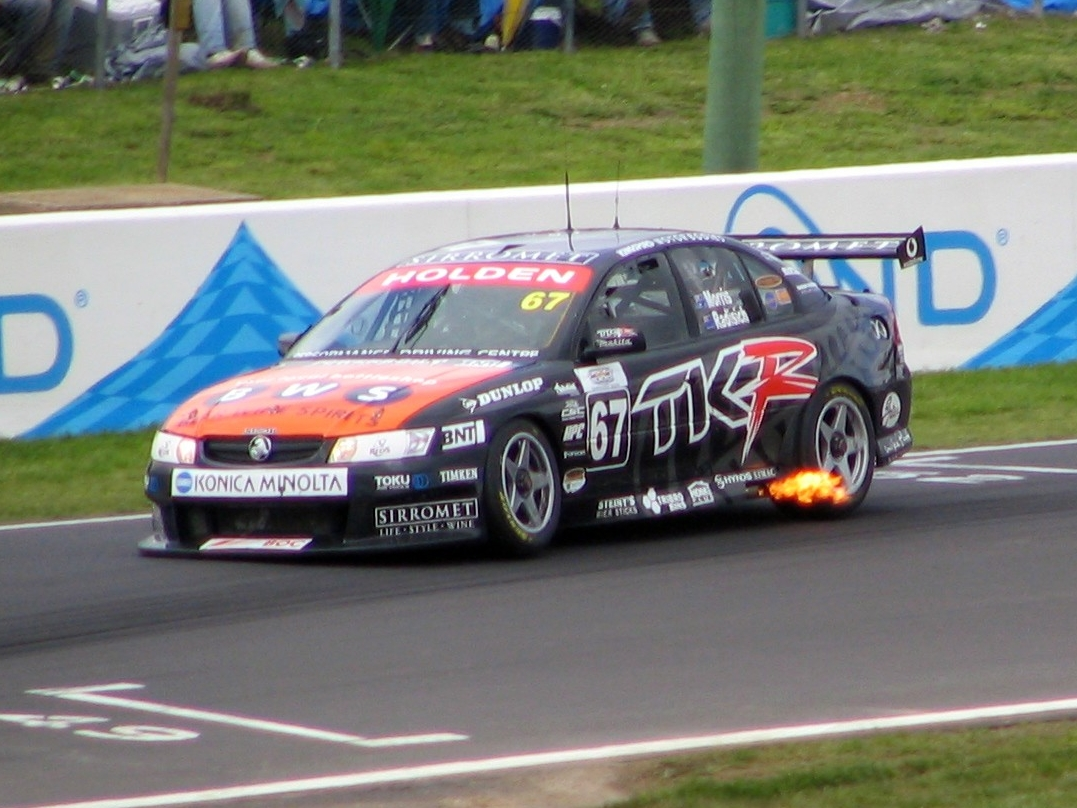
Paul Morris (Holden VZ Commodore) placed 19th in the championship

The following drivers and teams competed in the 2005 championship.

Manufacturer	Model	Team	No.	Driver name	Rounds	Co-driver name
Ford	Falcon BA	Stone Brothers Racing	1	(Australia) Marcos Ambrose	All	(Australia) Warren Luff
Ford	Falcon BA	Stone Brothers Racing	9	(Australia) Russell Ingall	All	(Australia) Luke Youlden
Ford	Falcon BA	Ford Performance Racing	5	(Australia) Greg Ritter	1–11	(Australia) Cameron McLean
Ford	Falcon BA	Ford Performance Racing	5	(Australia) David Brabham	12–13	(Australia) Cameron McLean
Ford	Falcon BA	Ford Performance Racing	6	(Australia) Jason Bright	All	(Australia) David Brabham
Ford	Falcon BA	WPS Racing	8	(New Zealand) Craig Baird	All	(Australia) Marcus Marshall (Canada) Alex Tagliani
Ford	Falcon BA	WPS Racing	48	(Australia) David Besnard	All	(Australia) Marcus Marshall (Canada) Alex Tagliani
Ford	Falcon BA	Larkham Motorsport	10	(Australia) Jason Bargwanna	1–8	(Switzerland) Alain Menu
Ford	Falcon BA	Larkham Motorsport	10	(New Zealand) Matt Halliday	9–10	(Switzerland) Alain Menu
Ford	Falcon BA	Larkham Motorsport	10	(Australia) Mark Winterbottom	11–13	(Switzerland) Alain Menu
Ford	Falcon BA	Larkham Motorsport	20	(Australia) Mark Winterbottom	1–10	(Australia) Jason Bargwanna
Ford	Falcon BA	Larkham Motorsport	20	(Australia) Jason Bargwanna	11–13	(Australia) Jason Bargwanna
Ford	Falcon BA	Brad Jones Racing	12	(Australia) John Bowe	All	(United Kingdom) John Cleland (Australia) Dale Brede
Ford	Falcon BA	Brad Jones Racing	21	(Australia) Brad Jones	All	(United Kingdom) John Cleland (Australia) Dale Brede
Ford	Falcon BA	Dick Johnson Racing	17	(Australia) Steven Johnson	All	(Australia) Will Davison
Ford	Falcon BA	Dick Johnson Racing	18	(Australia) Glenn Seton	All	(Australia) Dean Canto
Ford	Falcon BA	Britek Motorsport	25	(Australia) Steve Owen	1, 4, 6–10, 13	(Australia) José Fernández (Australia) Damien White
Ford	Falcon BA	Britek Motorsport	52	(Australia) Matthew White	All	(Australia) José Fernández (Australia) Damien White
Ford	Falcon BA	Triple Eight Race Engineering	88	(Australia) Steven Ellery	All	(Australia) Adam Macrow
Ford	Falcon BA	Triple Eight Race Engineering	888	(Australia) Craig Lowndes	All	(France) Yvan Muller
Holden	Commodore VY	Rod Nash Racing (PE)	7	(Australia) Alex Davison	1	—N/a
Holden	Commodore VY	Perkins Engineering	11	(New Zealand) Steven Richards	1–8	(Australia) Christian D'Agostin
Holden	Commodore VY	Perkins Engineering	11	(Australia) Matthew Coleman	9–10	(Australia) Christian D'Agostin
Holden	Commodore VY	Perkins Engineering	11	(Australia) Paul Dumbrell	11–13	(Australia) Christian D'Agostin
Holden	Commodore VY	Perkins Engineering	24	(Australia) Paul Dumbrell	1–2, 4, 6–10	(New Zealand) Steven Richards
Holden	Commodore VY	Perkins Engineering	24	(New Zealand) Steven Richards	11–13	(New Zealand) Steven Richards
Holden	Commodore VY	Paul Little Racing (PE)	75	(Australia) Anthony Tratt	All	(Australia) Tony Evangelou
Holden	Commodore VZ	Holden Racing Team	2	(Australia) Mark Skaife	All	(New Zealand) Jim Richards (Australia) James Courtney
Holden	Commodore VZ	Holden Racing Team	22	(Australia) Todd Kelly	All	(New Zealand) Jim Richards (Australia) James Courtney
Holden	Commodore VZ	Tasman Motorsport	3	(New Zealand) Jason Richards	All	(New Zealand) Fabian Coulthard (Australia) Tony D'Alberto
Holden	Commodore VZ	Tasman Motorsport	23	(Australia) Jamie Whincup	All	(New Zealand) Fabian Coulthard (Australia) Tony D'Alberto
Holden	Commodore VZ	Rod Nash Racing (PE)	7	(Australia) Alex Davison	4, 6–11	(Denmark) Allan Simonsen
Holden	Commodore VZ	Rod Nash Racing (PE)	7	(Australia) Paul Dumbrell	3, 5	(Denmark) Allan Simonsen
Holden	Commodore VZ	Rod Nash Racing (PE)	7	(Australia) Owen Kelly	12–13	(Denmark) Allan Simonsen
Holden	Commodore VZ	HSV Dealer Team (HRT)	15	(Australia) Rick Kelly	All	(Australia) Tim Leahey (Australia) Mark Noske
Holden	Commodore VZ	HSV Dealer Team (HRT)	16	(Australia) Garth Tander	All	(Australia) Tim Leahey (Australia) Mark Noske
Holden	Commodore VZ	Team Kiwi Racing; Paul Morris Motorsport	021	(New Zealand) Paul Radisich	All	(New Zealand) John Faulkner (Australia) Alan Gurr
Holden	Commodore VZ	Team Kiwi Racing; Paul Morris Motorsport	67	(Australia) Paul Morris	All	(New Zealand) John Faulkner (Australia) Alan Gurr
Holden	Commodore VZ	Garry Rogers Motorsport	33	(Australia) Cameron McConville	All	(Australia) Phillip Scifleet (Australia) Lee Holdsworth
Holden	Commodore VZ	Garry Rogers Motorsport	34	(Australia) Andrew Jones	1–10	(Australia) Phillip Scifleet (Australia) Lee Holdsworth
Holden	Commodore VZ	Garry Rogers Motorsport	34	(Australia) Dean Canto	11–12	(Australia) Phillip Scifleet (Australia) Lee Holdsworth
Holden	Commodore VZ	Garry Rogers Motorsport	34	(Australia) Lee Holdsworth	13	(Australia) Phillip Scifleet (Australia) Lee Holdsworth
Holden	Commodore VZ	Team Dynamik; Longhurst Racing (Note: Car #45 appeared as Longhurst Racing on some entry lists as a result of licence ownership issues.)	44	(New Zealand) Simon Wills	1–9, 13	(New Zealand) Mark Porter (New Zealand) Kayne Scott
Holden	Commodore VZ	Team Dynamik; Longhurst Racing	44	(Australia) Tony Longhurst	10	(New Zealand) Mark Porter (New Zealand) Kayne Scott
Holden	Commodore VZ	Team Dynamik; Longhurst Racing	45	(Brazil) Max Wilson	All	(New Zealand) Mark Porter (New Zealand) Kayne Scott
Holden	Commodore VZ	Paul Weel Racing	50	(Australia) Paul Weel	All	(Australia) Nathan Pretty (Australia) Owen Kelly
Holden	Commodore VZ	Paul Weel Racing	51	(New Zealand) Greg Murphy	All	(Australia) Nathan Pretty (Australia) Owen Kelly

* = Drove in Sandown 500 only. ** = Drove in Bathurst 1000 only.

== Calendar ==
The 2005 V8 Supercar Championship Series was contested over 13 rounds, including eleven single-driver 'sprint' rounds and two two-driver 'endurance' rounds.

Rd.	Event	Circuit	Location	Date
1	(South Australia) Clipsal 500 Adelaide	Adelaide Street Circuit	Adelaide, South Australia	17–20 March
2	(New Zealand) PlaceMakers V8 International	Pukekohe Park Raceway	Pukekohe, New Zealand	15–17 April
3	(Western Australia) Perth 400	Barbagallo Raceway	Perth, Western Australia	6–8 May
4	(New South Wales) Eastern Creek	Eastern Creek Raceway	Eastern Creek, New South Wales	27–29 May
5	Buick V8 Supercars China Round	Shanghai International Circuit	Shanghai, China	10–12 June
6	(Northern Territory) Skycity V8 Supercars	Hidden Valley Raceway	Darwin, Northern Territory	1–3 July
7	Queensland 300	Queensland Raceway	Ipswich, Queensland	22–24 July
8	(New South Wales) Oran Park	Oran Park Raceway	Sydney, New South Wales	12–14 August
9	(Victoria (state)) Betta Electrical 500	Sandown International Raceway	Melbourne, Victoria	9–11 September
10	(New South Wales) Super Cheap Auto 1000	Mount Panorama Circuit	Bathurst, New South Wales	6–9 October
11	(Queensland) Gillette V8 Supercar Challenge	Surfers Paradise Street Circuit	Surfers Paradise, Queensland	20–23 October
12	(Tasmania) Ferodo Triple Challenge	Symmons Plains Raceway	Launceston, Tasmania	12–13 November
13	(Victoria (state)) BigPond Grand Finale	Phillip Island Grand Prix Circuit	Phillip Island, Victoria	25–27 November

Australian rounds

New Zealand rounds

Chinese rounds

== Results and standings ==
=== Season summary ===
Round	Race	Event	Pole position	Race winners	Round winner	Report
1	R1	Adelaide	(Australia) Rick Kelly	(Australia) Marcos Ambrose	(Australia) Marcos Ambrose (Stone Brothers Racing, Ford)	report
1	R2	Adelaide		(Australia) Marcos Ambrose	(Australia) Marcos Ambrose (Stone Brothers Racing, Ford)	report
2	R1	Pukekohe	(Australia) Craig Lowndes	(New Zealand) Greg Murphy	(New Zealand) Greg Murphy (Paul Weel Racing, Holden)	report
2	R2	Pukekohe		(New Zealand) Greg Murphy	(New Zealand) Greg Murphy (Paul Weel Racing, Holden)	report
2	R3	Pukekohe		(New Zealand) Greg Murphy	(New Zealand) Greg Murphy (Paul Weel Racing, Holden)	report
3	R1	Perth	(Australia) Craig Lowndes	(Australia) Mark Skaife	(New Zealand) Steven Richards (Perkins Engineering, Holden)	report
3	R2	Perth		(New Zealand) Steven Richards	(New Zealand) Steven Richards (Perkins Engineering, Holden)	report
3	R3	Perth		(Australia) Russell Ingall	(New Zealand) Steven Richards (Perkins Engineering, Holden)	report
4	R1	Eastern Creek	(Australia) Craig Lowndes	(Australia) Marcos Ambrose	(Australia) Craig Lowndes (Triple Eight Race Engineering, Ford)	report
4	R2	Eastern Creek		(Australia) Craig Lowndes	(Australia) Craig Lowndes (Triple Eight Race Engineering, Ford)	report
5	R1	Shanghai	(Australia) Mark Skaife	(Australia) Todd Kelly	(Australia) Todd Kelly (Holden Racing Team, Holden)	report
5	R2	Shanghai		(Australia) Mark Skaife	(Australia) Todd Kelly (Holden Racing Team, Holden)	report
5	R3	Shanghai		(Australia) Todd Kelly	(Australia) Todd Kelly (Holden Racing Team, Holden)	report
6	R1	Darwin	(Australia) Mark Skaife	(Australia) Todd Kelly	(Australia) Todd Kelly (Holden Racing Team, Holden)	report
6	R2	Darwin		(Australia) Todd Kelly	(Australia) Todd Kelly (Holden Racing Team, Holden)	report
6	R3	Darwin		(Australia) Garth Tander	(Australia) Todd Kelly (Holden Racing Team, Holden)	report
7		Ipswich	(Australia) Marcos Ambrose	(Australia) Craig Lowndes (Triple Eight Race Engineering, Ford)		report
8	R1	Oran Park	(Australia) Marcos Ambrose	(New Zealand) Steven Richards	(Australia) Russell Ingall (Stone Brothers Racing, Ford)	report
8	R2	Oran Park		(Australia) Russell Ingall	(Australia) Russell Ingall (Stone Brothers Racing, Ford)	report
9		Sandown	(Australia) Garth Tander	(Australia) Craig Lowndes (France) Yvan Muller (Triple Eight Race Engineering, Ford)		report
10		Bathurst	(Australia) Craig Lowndes	(Australia) Mark Skaife (Australia) Todd Kelly (Holden Racing Team, Holden)		report
11	R1	Gold Coast	(New Zealand) Greg Murphy	(New Zealand) Greg Murphy	(Australia) Craig Lowndes (Triple Eight Race Engineering, Ford)	report
11	R2	Gold Coast		(Australia) Craig Lowndes	(Australia) Craig Lowndes (Triple Eight Race Engineering, Ford)	report
11	R3	Gold Coast		(Australia) Craig Lowndes	(Australia) Craig Lowndes (Triple Eight Race Engineering, Ford)	report
12	R1	Launceston	(New Zealand) Steven Richards	(Australia) Garth Tander	(Australia) Garth Tander (HSV Dealer Team, Holden)	report
12	R2	Launceston		(Australia) Garth Tander	(Australia) Garth Tander (HSV Dealer Team, Holden)	report
12	R3	Launceston		(Australia) Garth Tander	(Australia) Garth Tander (HSV Dealer Team, Holden)	report
13	R1	Phillip Island	(Australia) Craig Lowndes	(Australia) Craig Lowndes	(Australia) Marcos Ambrose (Stone Brothers Racing, Ford)	report
13	R2	Phillip Island		(Australia) Marcos Ambrose	(Australia) Marcos Ambrose (Stone Brothers Racing, Ford)	report
13	R3	Phillip Island		(Australia) Marcos Ambrose	(Australia) Marcos Ambrose (Stone Brothers Racing, Ford)	report

=== Points system ===
Points were awarded on the results of each race as follows.

Position	1st	2nd	3rd	4th	5th	6th	7th	8th	9th	10th	11th	12th	13th	14th	15th	16th	17th	18th	19th	20th	21st	22nd	23rd	24th	25th	26th	27th	28th	29th	30th	31st	32nd
1 race per round	192	186	180	174	168	162	156	150	144	138	132	126	120	114	108	102	96	90	84	78	72	66	60	54	48	42	36	30	24	18	12	6
2 races per round	96	93	90	87	84	81	78	75	72	69	66	63	60	57	54	51	48	45	42	39	36	33	30	27	24	21	18	15	12	9	6	3
3 races per round	64	62	60	58	56	54	52	50	48	46	44	42	40	38	36	34	32	30	28	26	24	22	20	18	16	14	12	10	8	6	4	2

=== Drivers championship ===
Pos.	Driver	No.	ADE (South Australia)		PUK (New Zealand)			BAR (Western Australia)			EAS (New South Wales)		SHA (China)			HID (Northern Territory)			QLD (Queensland)	ORA (New South Wales)		SAN (Victoria (state))	BAT (New South Wales)	SUR (Queensland)			SYM (Tasmania)			PHI (Victoria (state))			Pen.	Pts.
1	(Australia) Russell Ingall	9	2	18	2	2	2	4	2	1	5	6	13	6	26	14	4	Ret	4	2	1	7	5	4	10	24	8	9	10	5	5	5	0	1922
2	(Australia) Craig Lowndes	888	3	2	14	5	Ret	21	3	Ret	2	1	4	Ret	Ret	3	32	11	1	9	4	1	15	2	1	1	5	3	3	1	3	15	0	1865
3	(Australia) Marcos Ambrose	1	1	1	5	3	4	2	5	3	1	2	5	4	12	4	28	9	2	4	2	14	Ret	Ret	26	11	4	27	6	3	1	1	25	1856
4	(Australia) Todd Kelly	22	8	4	8	Ret	9	Ret	23	7	6	4	1	3	1	1	1	2	6	Ret	22	2	1	Ret	14	8	15	11	7	13	16	6	0	1760
5	(Australia) Mark Skaife	2	Ret	3	3	4	5	1	29	6	7	7	3	1	23	2	2	26	12	16	30	2	1	3	3	2	25	12	9	15	10	8	0	1754
6	(Australia) Garth Tander	16	7	Ret	17	20	9	29	14	13	9	10	12	21	22	5	3	1	3	26	5	4	16	10	4	4	1	1	1	2	2	4	0	1734
7	(New Zealand) Steven Richards	11/24	5	26	28	8	3	3	1	2	3	5	2	2	2	22	12	4	5	1	11	13	Ret	27	28	18	2	2	4	27	12	26	0	1669
8	(Australia) Rick Kelly	15	15	9	16	Ret	15	14	16	15	31	14	Ret	16	Ret	9	5	3	15	5	6	4	16	9	5	6	3	4	2	4	4	3	0	1630
9	(Australia) Jason Bright	6	19	11	7	11	7	16	7	22	33	23	7	20	6	Ret	9	8	9	7	7	6	14	8	9	9	7	17	16	31	13	7	0	1566
10	(Australia) Cameron McConville	33	17	6	21	18	Ret	8	9	19	15	13	16	9	9	18	31	22	17	8	8	10	4	5	6	5	14	15	17	18	14	21	0	1501
11	(New Zealand) Greg Murphy	51	6	Ret	1	1	1	5	30	Ret	4	3	10	Ret	7	13	16	Ret	8	3	3	Ret	Ret	1	2	3	20	5	5	6	7	2	6	1500
12	(Australia) Steven Johnson	17	4	15	13	26	Ret	11	4	5	13	9	11	26	21	12	11	7	10	10	31	18	19	14	11	12	10	7	8	22	19	18	0	1460
13	(Australia) Steven Ellery	88	Ret	DNS	4	7	22	30	13	10	28	8	15	24	27	28	13	6	7	DNS	DNS	5	3	7	7	7	9	13	18	8	6	10	0	1424
14	(New Zealand) Paul Radisich	021	23	10	6	6	6	6	8	Ret	32	18	6	5	3	6	8	27	29	12	9	8	Ret	13	13	27	12	10	12	7	8	14	0	1384
15	(Australia) Glenn Seton	18	9	25	26	13	12	12	15	9	20	27	14	7	24	8	7	5	11	18	13	12	9	23	23	20	22	19	20	29	24	11	0	1353
16	(Australia) Jamie Whincup	23	10	22	10	28	11	13	24	14	24	15	9	8	4	15	14	17	28	Ret	15	3	2	15	8	10	18	Ret	30	12	18	Ret	0	1307
17	(New Zealand) Jason Richards	3	20	Ret	18	29	14	7	25	17	10	12	8	Ret	Ret	25	6	15	Ret	6	28	3	2	6	Ret	19	11	8	14	17	11	16	0	1295
18	(Australia) John Bowe	12	12	Ret	12	10	8	15	11	8	12	8	22	15	14	10	10	12	22	20	19	9	21	16	15	17	23	28	29	23	29	27	0	1233
19	(Australia) Paul Morris	67	14	16	9	19	16	10	17	11	11	Ret	17	22	25	7	18	18	26	Ret	18	8	Ret	24	21	25	Ret	16	13	14	28	13	0	1059
20	(Australia) Paul Dumbrell	24/11	16	5	26	16	Ret	22	Ret	24	16	Ret	19	12	11	Ret	15	10	18	17	24	13	Ret	22	18	22	6	6	11	9	15	19	75	1046
21	(Australia) Brad Jones	21	13	20	22	Ret	20	25	19	Ret	14	11	25	17	10	17	30	Ret	20	23	20	9	21	17	16	28	17	21	19	24	Ret	24	0	1027
22	(Australia) Paul Weel	50	11	8	11	9	10	27	6	4	27	26	20	11	19	26	26	14	Ret	14	14	Ret	Ret	Ret	22	16	13	24	21	10	9	9	0	1000
23	(New Zealand) Craig Baird	8	Ret	17	Ret	12	Ret	19	20	16	21	17	24	19	15	27	20	16	16	Ret	Ret	19	8	11	12	29	26	18	27	30	28	29	0	980
24	(Brazil) Max Wilson	45	Ret	7	15	15	Ret	31	18	Ret	26	16	Ret	14	5	16	33	13	14	13	10	DNS	Ret	26	25	14	16	14	15	20	21	12	4	931
25	(Australia) David Besnard	48	18	23	29	27	Ret	17	12	20	30	24	Ret	Ret	Ret	Ret	29	25	13	19	16	19	8	12	30	21	24	25	31	Ret	25	20	0	904
26	(Australia) Jason Bargwanna	10/20	Ret	Ret	Ret	14	Ret	9	10	12	17	21	21	Ret	13	Ret	24	19	19	11	12	16	Ret	Ret	19	Ret	19	30	28	16	17	17	0	883
27	(Australia) Greg Ritter	5	Ret	Ret	19	24	21	28	Ret	Ret	18	Ret	23	10	8	11	23	24	Ret	15	29	15	18	19	20	15							0	739
28	(Australia) Andrew Jones	34	22	27	27	21	19	26	21	25	28	Ret	26	18	17	19	Ret	Ret	21	25	25	10	4										0	733
29	(Australia) Mark Winterbottom	20/10	24	14	24	22	17	20	27	21	23	Ret	Ret	DNS	DNS	24	27	20	25	Ret	27	16	Ret	21	29	26	21	22	25	19	20	25	0	668
30	(Australia) Matthew White	52	Ret	12	25	25	Ret	24	22	26	22	19	27	23	18	21	22	23	27	24	Ret	23	Ret	25	27	Ret	27	26	22	28	31	30	0	619
31	(Australia) Anthony Tratt	75	21	24	23	23	18	23	26	23	24	Ret	28	25	16	Ret	25	Ret	Ret	22	21	25	Ret	18	Ret	30	28	31	32	DNS	DNS	DNS	0	511
32	(Australia) Steve Owen	25	25	13							19	22				20	19	21	24	27	26	23	Ret							21	Ret	22	0	480
33	(Australia) Alex Davison	7	Ret	21							29	25				23	17	Ret	Ret	21	23	17	20	Ret	24	23							0	469
34	(New Zealand) Simon Wills	44	Ret	19	30	17	Ret	18	28	18	34	20	18	13	20	Ret	21	Ret	23	Ret	17	DNS								Ret	26	23	0	437
35	(Australia) Dean Canto	18/34																				12	9	20	17	13	29	20	23				0	312
36	(Australia) David Brabham	6/5																				6	14				EX	23	24	11	22	31	0	280
37	(Australia) Owen Kelly	50/7																				Ret	6				30	29	26	26	30	Ret	0	320
38	(France) Yvan Muller	888																				1	15										0	192
39	(Australia) Adam Macrow	88																				5	3										0	184
40	(Australia) Luke Youlden	9																				7	5										0	176
41	(Australia) Nathan Pretty	50																				Ret	6										0	172
42	(Australia) Dale Brede	12																				21	7										0	168
42	(United Kingdom) John Cleland	12																				21	7										0	168
44	(Australia) Lee Holdsworth	33/34																				20	Ret							25	23	28	0	162
45	(New Zealand) John Faulkner	021																				Ret	10										0	156
45	(Australia) Alan Gurr	021																				Ret	10										0	156
47	(Australia) James Courtney	22																				11	Ret										0	152
47	(New Zealand) Jim Richards	22																				11	Ret										0	152
47	(Australia) Mark Porter	45																				Ret	11										0	152
47	(New Zealand) Kayne Scott	45																				Ret	11										0	152
51	(Switzerland) Alain Menu	10																				Ret	12										0	148
51	(New Zealand) Matt Halliday	10																				Ret	12										0	148
53	(Australia) Marcus Marshall	8																				22	13										0	144
53	(Canada) Alex Tagliani	8																				22	13										0	144
55	(Australia) Warren Luff	1																				14	Ret										0	140
56	(Australia) Cameron McLean	5																				15	18										0	136
57	(Denmark) Allan Simonsen	7																				17	20										0	128
58	(Australia) José Fernández	52																				24	17										0	128
58	(Australia) Damien White	52																				24	17										0	128
60	(Australia) Will Davison	17																				18	19										0	124
61	(Australia) Phillip Scifleet	33																				20	Ret										0	116
62	(Australia) Tony Evangelou	75																				25	Ret										0	96
63	(Australia) Matthew Coleman	11																				26	Ret										0	92
63	(Australia) Christian D'Agostin	11																				26	Ret										0	92
–	(New Zealand) Fabian Coulthard	23																				Ret	Ret										0	0
–	(Australia) Tony D'Alberto	23																				Ret	Ret										0	0
–	(Australia) Mark Noske	15																				Ret	Ret										0	0
–	(Australia) Tim Leahey	15																				Ret	Ret										0	0
–	(Australia) Tony Longhurst	44																					Ret										0	0
Pos.	Driver	No.	ADE (South Australia)		PUK (New Zealand)			BAR (Western Australia)			EAS (New South Wales)		SHA (China)			HID (Northern Territory)			QLD (Queensland)	ORA (New South Wales)		SAN (Victoria (state))	BAT (New South Wales)	SUR (Queensland)			SYM (Tasmania)			PHI (Victoria (state))			Pen.	Pts.

Colour	Result
Gold	Winner
Silver	Second place
Bronze	Third place
Green	Points classification
Blue	Non-points classification
Blue	Non-classified finish (NC)
Purple	Retired, not classified (Ret)
Red	Did not qualify (DNQ)
Red	Did not pre-qualify (DNPQ)
Black	Disqualified (DSQ)
White	Did not start (DNS)
White	Withdrew (WD)
White	Race cancelled (C)
Blank	Did not practice (DNP)
Blank	Did not arrive (DNA)
Blank	Excluded (EX)

- Each round carried a maximum of 192, 186, 180 points etc. with each race at two-race rounds carrying half points and each race at three-race rounds carrying one third points.
- Each driver was required to drop his/her worst score from the first ten rounds.
- Gross total points are shown within brackets.

=== Teams championship ===
Pos	Team	Penalty	Rd 1	Rd 2	Rd 3	Rd 4	Rd 5	Rd 6	Rd 7	Rd 8	Rd 9	Rd 10	Rd 11	Rd 12	Rd 13	Total
1	Stone Brothers Racing	0	330	360	362	354	264	212	360	369	304	176	180	268	356	3895
2	Holden Racing Team	0	252	264	198	324	332	328	288	93	340	192	270	238	260	3379
3	Triple Eight Race Engineering	0	183	226	180	279	124	210	348	159	368	320	346	294	310	3347
4	HSV Dealer Team	0	204	176	194	204	122	344	288	270	180	132	320	372	358	3164
5	Dick Johnson Racing	0	237	162	284	189	190	296	270	180	272	280	190	224	150	2924
6	Paul Weel Racing	0	222	330	186	216	196	140	150	294	0	172	242	220	310	2678
7	Perkins Engineering	0	240	168	186	225	186	204	258	237	236	0	126	334	180	2580
8	Ford Performance Racing	0	108	218	118	75	248	180	144	222	308	264	236	156	166	2443
9	Brad Jones Racing	0	162	186	178	261	190	172	144	150	272	280	178	122	76	2371
10	Garry Rogers Motorsport	0	180	118	184	129	206	84	168	198	272	180	264	160	138	2281
11	Tasman Motorsport	0	141	176	196	213	206	212	30	150	184	188	214	168	182	2260
12	WPS Racing	0	123	62	190	120	82	96	222	93	228	308	166	94	68	1852
13	Larkham Motor Sport	0	84	110	186	114	64	102	132	147	132	148	74	106	168	1567
14	Team Dynamik	0	120	110	90	111	190	98	174	177	0	152	68	108	126	1524
15	Team Kiwi Racing (S)	0	99	162	104	48	170	116	24	135	0	156	92	130	140	1376
16	Britek Motorsport	0	147	32	58	150	62	144	90	66	204	128	28	48	66	1223
17	Paul Morris Motorsport (S)	0	108	110	122	66	70	112	42	45	164	0	58	74	88	1059
18	Rod Nash Racing (S)	0	36		44	36	114	52	0	63	128	116	38	28	20	675
19	Paul Little Racing (S)	0	63	70	58	24	60	16	0	72	96	0	36	16	0	511

(S) denotes a single car team.

=== Manufacturers championship ===
Ford was awarded the Champion Manufacturer title, having achieved the most round wins during the series.
