= Britek Motorsport =

Australian Supercars motor racing team

- Manufacturer: Ford
- Team Principal: Jason Bright
- Team Manager: Chris Jewell
- Race Drivers: 56. Jason Bright
- Chassis: FG X Falcon
- Debut: 2005
- Drivers' Championships: 0
- Round wins: 0
- 2017 position: 1
- 14th (1524 pts)

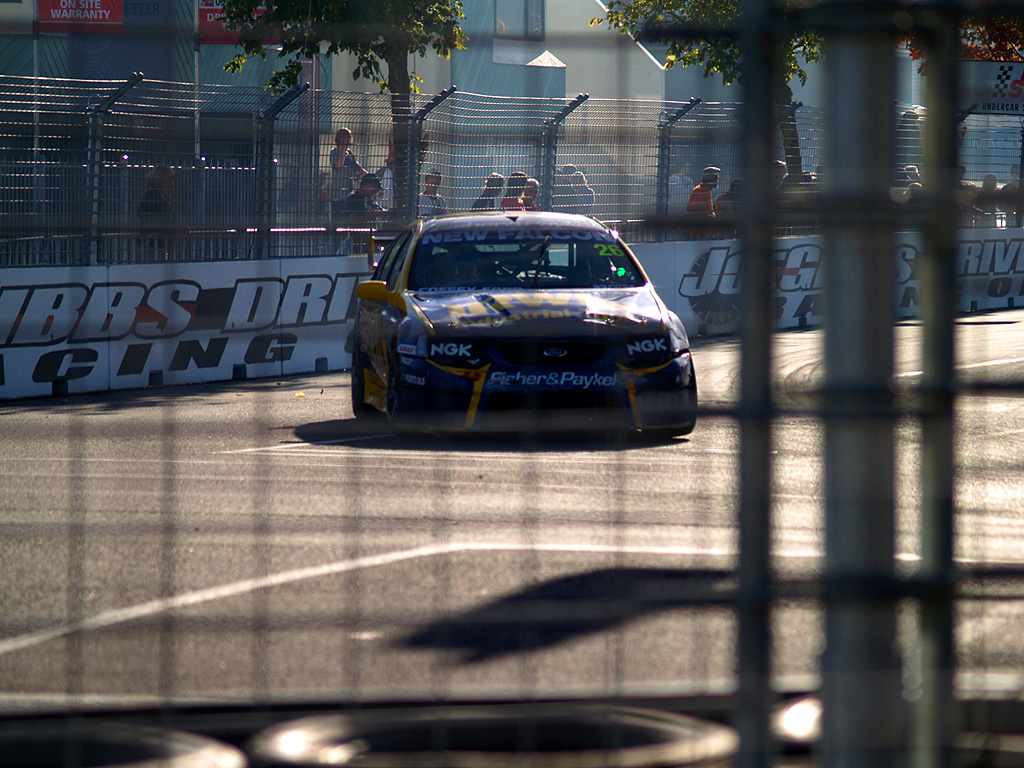
Marcus Marshall at the 2008 Hamilton 400.

Britek Motorsport was an Australian Supercars motor racing team owned by Bathurst 1000 winning driver Jason Bright. Established in 2005, the team originally ran as an independent team, however since 2010, its only remaining asset has been one Racing Entitlement Contract, which was most recently used to enter a fourth Ford FG X Falcon for Prodrive Racing Australia in 2017, officially under the Britek name, then leased out for a further two seasons. This was sold ahead of the 2020 season.

== Supercars Championship ==
=== Independent team ===
==== Formation ====
Britek Motorsport was formed in 2005 as part of Jason Bright's deal to switch from Holden to Ford. As part of his package, Ford Performance Racing (FPR) assisted in establishing the team in return for Bright committing to driving for FPR for two years. V8 Supercars deemed there was a link between Britek and Ford Performance Racing and thus grouped them, preventing Britek from testing its cars. The team received sponsorship from Fujitsu, which it would retain until the end of the 2009 season.

The team's drivers for the 2005 season were Steve Owen and Matthew White, who were subsequently replaced in 2006 by Warren Luff and the second car was shared by José Fernández and Tony Ricciardello with the Racing Entitlement Contract leased to Mark Porter for his MSport Holden team for the PlaceMakers V8 International at Pukekohe in New Zealand.

==== Bright arrives ====
Jason Bright left Ford Performance Racing in 2007 to drive for Britek, and in doing so joining the ranks of driver-team owners. He was joined for the season by Alan Gurr. In 2007, Britek showed promise with Bright at the wheel and were able to break into the top ten a few times. At the 2007 Bathurst 1000, Bright, driving with Adam Macrow at one point was leading the race but later crashed due to the combination of cold slick tyres and wet weather while running well inside the top ten.

In 2008, Alan Gurr was replaced by former Champ Car and Australian Carrera Cup Championship racer Marcus Marshall. At the end of the year, following the loss of Ford factory sponsorship, Bright closed the team.

=== Customer team ===
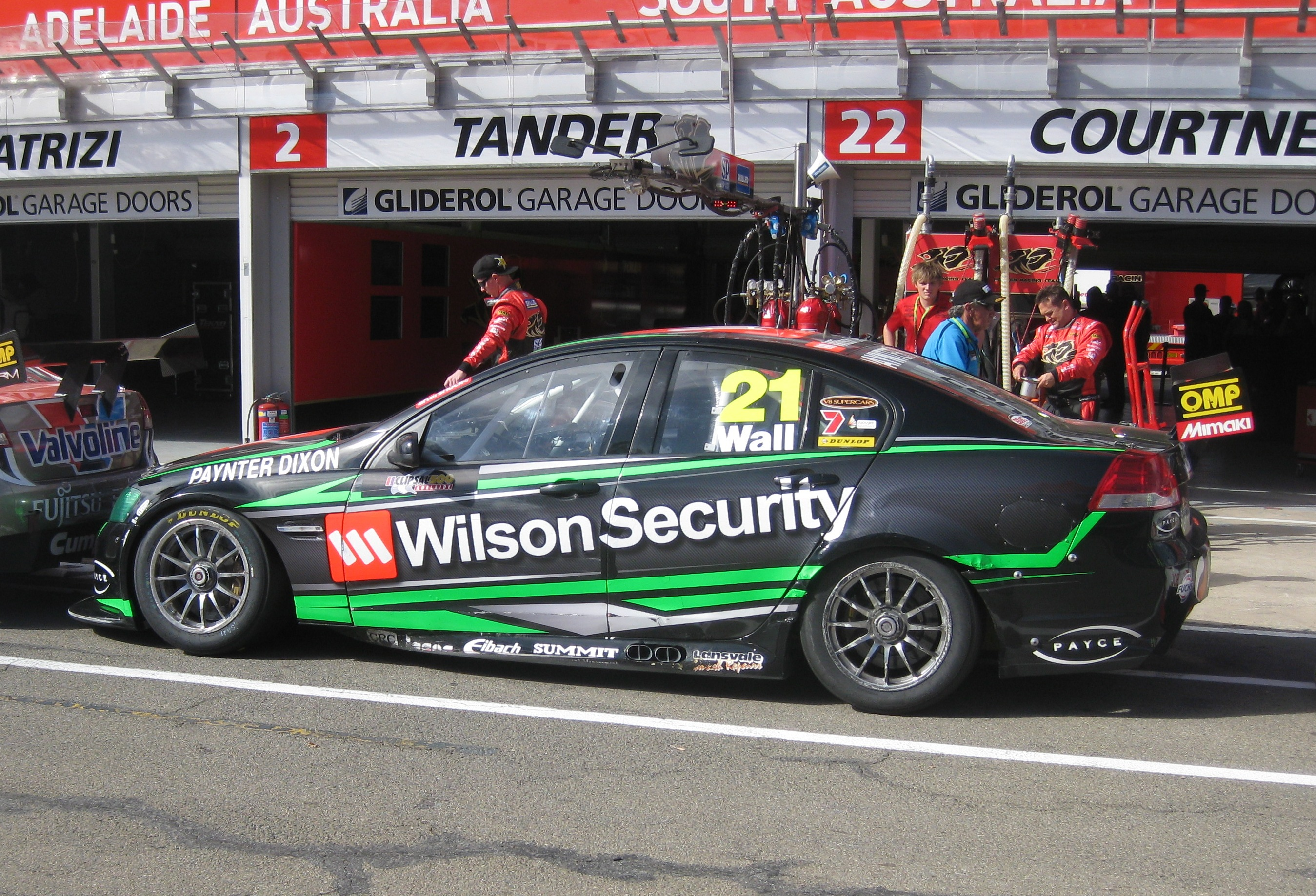
The Holden VE Commodore of David Wall at the 2012 Clipsal 500.

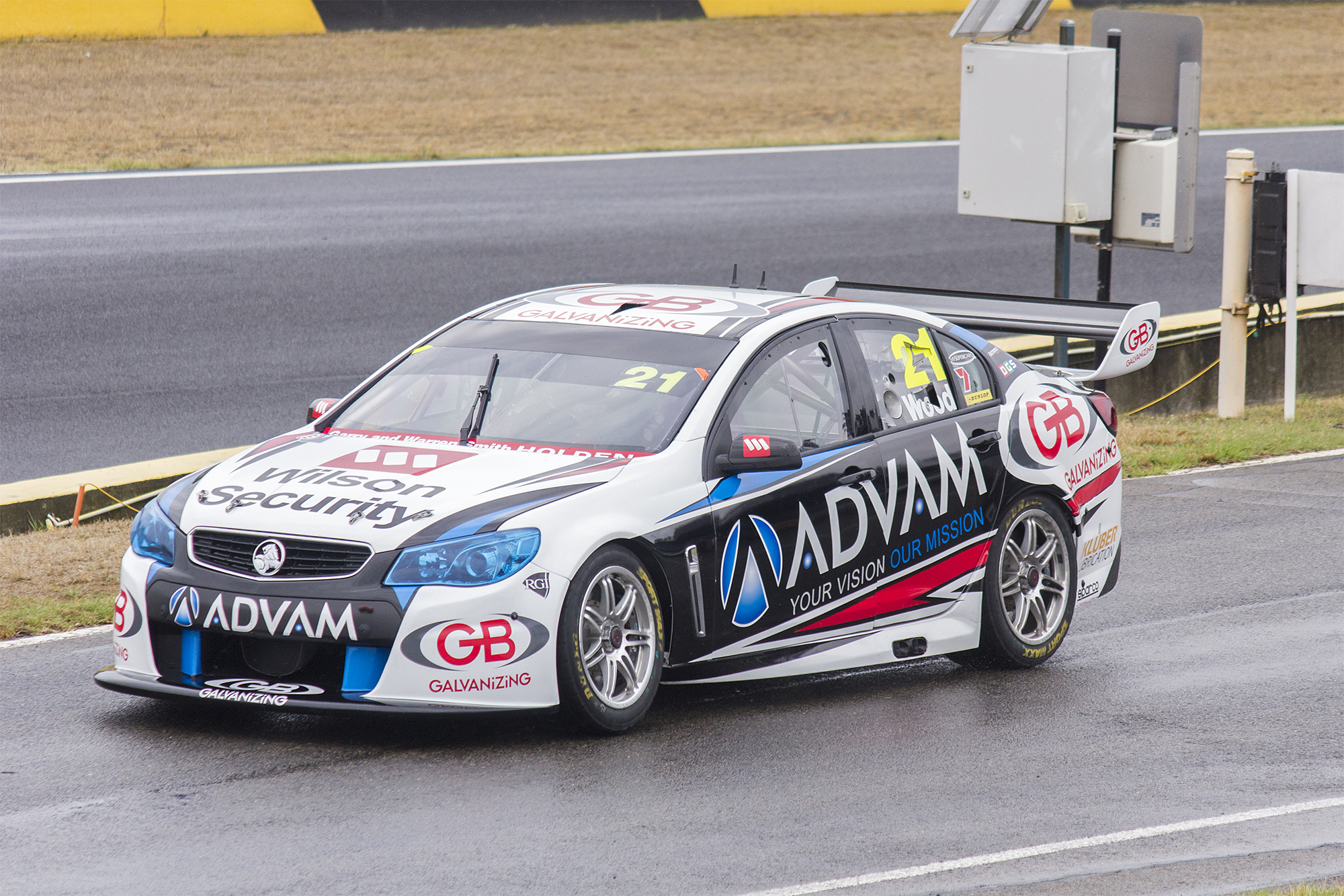
The Holden VF Commodore of Dale Wood at the Sydney Motorsport Park test day in February 2014.

==== Stone Brothers Racing ====
Bright concluded a deal with Stone Brothers Racing to race a customer BF and later FG Falcon for the 2009 season, with Bright out performing the Stone Brothers' cars on a number of occasions. Bright's second Racing Entitlement Contract was leased to Paul Cruickshank Racing for the season before it was sold at the end of the year to Tekno Autosports.

==== Brad Jones Racing ====
In 2010, Bright joined Brad Jones Racing as a full-time driver. The remaining Britek licence has been used to enter a third Brad Jones Racing Holden Commodore, with Karl Reindler driving in 2010 and 2011, David Wall in 2012 and 2013, and Dale Wood in 2014 and 2015. Tim Blanchard took over the driving for 2016.

==== Prodrive Racing Australia ====
For 2017, Bright moved his Racing Entitlement Contract from BJR to Prodrive Racing Australia to drive a fourth Ford FG X Falcon. The entry was run for the entire season as number #56.

=== Lease to Matt Stone Racing and eventual sale ===
Following Bright’s retirement from full-time driving, the Racing Entitlement Contract was leased to Matt Stone Racing for 2018 and 2019. This provided them with the opportunity to step up as a team from the Super2 Series. Bright and Britek were not involved in the operations beyond the leasing of the REC. Matt Stone Racing were forced to return the REC at the conclusion of the 2019 season, as regulations prohibit the leasing of a REC for greater than two years; they replaced this with one acquired from the exiting Garry Rogers Motorsport. This returned control of the REC to Britek; they elected to sell it at this point to Peter Smith, father of debuting driver Jack, to underpin his full-time entry, operated by Brad Jones Racing.

== Supercars Championship drivers ==
The following is a list of drivers who have driven for the team in Supercars, in order of their first appearance. Drivers who only drove for the team on a part-time basis are listed in italics.

- (Australia) Steve Owen (2005)
- (Australia) Matthew White (2005)
- (Australia) José Fernández (2005–06)
- (Australia) Damien White (2005)
- (Australia) Warren Luff (2006–07)
- (Australia) Tony Ricciardello (2006)
- (Australia) Adam Macrow (2006–07)
- (Australia) Jason Bright (2007–09, 2017)
- (Australia) Alan Gurr (2007)
- (Australia) Marcus Marshall (2008)
- (New Zealand) Matt Halliday (2008)
- (Australia) Karl Reindler (2009–11)
- (Australia) David Wall (2010–13)
- (Italy) Fabrizio Giovanardi (2010–11)
- (New Zealand) Chris Pither (2012–14)
- (United Kingdom) Jamie Campbell-Walter (2012)
- (Australia) Dale Wood (2014–15)
- (Australia) Macauley Jones (2015–16)
- (Australia) Tim Blanchard (2016)
- (Australia) Garry Jacobson (2017)

== Rallying ==
Britek also briefly ran Ford's official entry in the Australian Rally Championship, the two Ford Fiesta Super 2000 cars driven by Michael Guest and Darren Windus. This deal fell through in early 2008 when the program was abandoned after Pirtek announced that they could no longer sponsor the team. Britek briefly fielded an entry for Windus before winding up the rally team.

== Complete Bathurst 1000 results ==
Year	No.	Car	Drivers	Position	Laps
2005	25	Ford Falcon BA	(Australia) Steve Owen (Australia) Matthew White	DNF	136
2005	52	Ford Falcon BA	(Australia) José Fernández (Australia) Damien White	17th	148
2006	25	Ford Falcon BA	(Australia) Warren Luff (Australia) Adam Macrow	DNF	102
2006	26	Ford Falcon BA	(Australia) José Fernández (Australia) Tony Ricciardello	16th	159
2007	25	Ford Falcon BF	(Australia) Jason Bright (Australia) Adam Macrow	DNF	149
2007	26	Ford Falcon BF	(Australia) Alan Gurr (Australia) Warren Luff	DNF	134
2008	25	Ford Falcon BF	(Australia) Jason Bright (Australia) Adam Macrow	9th	161
2008	26	Ford Falcon BF	(Australia) Marcus Marshall (New Zealand) Matthew Halliday	14th	160
2009	25	Ford Falcon FG	(Australia) Jason Bright (Australia) Karl Reindler	11th	161
2010	21	Holden Commodore VE	(Australia) Karl Reindler (Australia) David Wall	15th	161
2011	21	Holden Commodore VE	(Australia) Karl Reindler (Australia) David Wall	14th	161
2012	21	Holden Commodore VE	(Australia) David Wall (New Zealand) Chris Pither	14th	161
2013	21	Holden Commodore VF	(Australia) David Wall (New Zealand) Chris Pither	22nd	156
2014	21	Holden Commodore VF	(Australia) Dale Wood (New Zealand) Chris Pither	DNF	45
2015	21	Holden Commodore VF	(Australia) Dale Wood (Australia) Macauley Jones	15th	161
2016	21	Holden Commodore VF	(Australia) Tim Blanchard (Australia) Macauley Jones	10th	161
2017	56	Ford Falcon FG X	(Australia) Jason Bright (Australia) Garry Jacobson	8th	161
