= Anthony Tratt =

Professional racing car driver

Anthony Craig Tratt (born November 3, 1965) is a professional racing car driver who grew up in Sydney, NSW, Australia.

== Background ==
Tratt showed an interest in motorsport from when he was a youngster, at the age of just ten years, via the Seton family. He would jump in the truck with Barry Seton, Russell and Mark Skaife and it was that which gave him his “first taste” for the sport.

As he grew older, Tratt was given the opportunity to build a Porsche. He explains: “Once you’ve raced anything and racing is in your system it’s hard not to do it, so after a while I got bored of just helping out. At the time, a friend of ours was building a Porsche Cup car, so I helped him out. In the end the guy who owned it wasn’t able to race it, so I was asked to have a go. My first race was at Adelaide and we won. They thought that was pretty good, so I was allowed to race again.”

== Racing career ==
Tratt has been racing with Paul Little since the early 1990s when they both raced Porsches. Towards the end of that decade, they had built up an affiliation in which Little ran his own V8 team and Tratt was the driver. Tratt's full-time career in V8 began in 1997 at the Wayne Gardner Racing in the Coke Team. Together with Paul Stokell he drove the second car, with Neil Crompton and Wayne in the lead car.

In 1998, Stokell and Tratt began leasing cars, from which point on they began their own team. During these years, Tratt competed against the big teams that had two cars and given that his team was small – composed mostly of volunteers – he was proud to ultimately be only six-tenths off the fastest times.

Tratt's final full-time V8 race was the 2005 Supercars Championship Series at Phillip Island. But he had an accident at the Hayshed. In 2006, he came back for the endurance races partnering with Tony D’Alberto in the HSV Dealer Team and that race ended with a crash at Reid Park. He also competed in the Carrera Cup, coming in at Number 8.

== Career results ==
=== Career summary ===
Season	Series	Team	Races	Poles	Wins	Podiums	F.Laps	Points	Position
1998	Australian Touring Car Championship	Paul Little Racing	13	0	0	0	0	23	34th
1999	Shell Championship Series	Paul Little Racing	13	0	0	0	0	163	46th
2000	Shell Championship Series	Paul Little Racing	29	0	0	0	0	22	63rd
2001	Shell Championship Series	Paul Little Racing	27	0	0	0	0	1065	26th
2002	V8 Supercar Championship Series	Paul Little Racing	21	0	0	0	0	321	31st
2003	V8 Supercar Championship Series	Paul Little Racing	21	0	0	0	0	678	31st
2003	Australian Nations Cup Championship	Paul Little Racing	9	0	0	0	1	92	10th
2004	V8 Supercar Championship Series	Paul Little Racing	26	0	0	0	0	1047	23rd
2005	V8 Supercar Championship Series	Paul Little Racing	30	0	0	0	0	511	31st
2006	V8 Supercar Championship Series	HSV Dealer Team	2	0	0	0	0	170	53rd
2006	Australian Carrera Cup Championship	Greg Murphy Racing	24	0	0	0	0	390	9th

=== Complete V8 Supercar results ===
(Races in bold indicate pole position) (Races in italics indicate fastest lap)

V8 Supercars results
Year	Team	Car	1	2	3	4	5	6	7	8	9	10	11	12	13	14	15	16	17	18	19	20	21	22	23	24	25	26	27	28	29	30	31	32	33	34	Position	Points
1998	Paul Little Racing	Ford Falcon (EL)	EAS; R1	EAS; R2	EAS; R3	SAN; R4	SAN; R5	SAN; R6	BAT; R7	BAT; R8	BAT; R9	SYM; R10; 18	SYM; R11; Ret	SYM; R12; Ret	PHI; R13; 20	PHI; R14; 17	PHI; R15; Ret	CAL; R16; 22	CAL; R17; 17	CAL; R18; Ret	LAK; R19	LAK; R20	LAK; R21	BAR; R22; 26	BAR; R23; 17	BAR; R24; C	MAL; R25	MAL; R26	MAL; R27	ORA; R28; 25	ORA; R29; 27	ORA; R30; Ret					34th	23
1999	Paul Little Racing	Ford Falcon (AU)	EAS; R1; 26	EAS; R2; 27	EAS; R3; 23	ADE; R4	BAR; R5	BAR; R6	BAR; R7	PHI; R8; 19	PHI; R9; Ret	PHI; R10; Wth	HDV; R11; 20	HDV; R12; Ret	HDV; R13; Ret	SAN; R14; 25	SAN; R15; Ret	SAN; R16; Wth	QLD; R17	QLD; R18	QLD; R19	CAL; R20; 26	CAL; R21; 21	CAL; R22; 25	SYM; R23; 25	SYM; R24; 19	SYM; R25; 16	WIN; R26; Ret	WIN; R27; 29	WIN; R28; 30	ORA; R29; Wth	ORA; R30; Wth	ORA; R31; Wth	QLD; R32; 17	BAT; R33; Ret		46th	163
2000	Paul Little Racing	Ford Falcon (AU)	PHI; R1; 23	PHI; R2; 29	BAR; R3; 25	BAR; R4; 26	BAR; R5; 22	ADE; R6; 29	ADE; R7; 24	EAS; R8; Ret	EAS; R9; Wth	EAS; R10; Wth	HDV; R11; 15	HDV; R12; Ret	HDV; R13; 19	CAN; R14; 26	CAN; R15; 20	CAN; R16; Ret	QLD; R17; 20	QLD; R18; 26	QLD; R19; 23	WIN; R20; 17	WIN; R21; Ret	WIN; R22; 19	ORA; R23; 24	ORA; R24; Ret	ORA; R25; 21	CAL; R26; 27	CAL; R27; Ret	CAL; R28; Wth	QLD; R29; Ret	SAN; R30; Ret	SAN; R31; Wth	SAN; R32; Wth	BAT; R33; Ret		63rd	22
2001	Paul Little Racing	Ford Falcon (AU)	PHI; R1; DNS	PHI; R2; 30	ADE; R3; 18	ADE; R4; 18	EAS; R5; 18	EAS; R6; 28	HDV; R7; Ret	HDV; R8; 23	HDV; R9; 24	CAN; R10; 17	CAN; R11; 19	CAN; R12; Ret	BAR; R13; 30	BAR; R14; 23	BAR; R15; 20	CAL; R16; 23	CAL; R17; 22	CAL; R18; Ret	ORA; R19; DNQ	ORA; R20; DNQ	QLD; R21; 17	WIN; R22; 13	WIN; R23; 15	BAT; R24; 15	PUK; R25; 15	PUK; R26; 20	PUK; R27; Ret	SAN; R28; Ret	SAN; R29; Ret	SAN; R30; 20					26th	1065
2002	Paul Little Racing	Ford Falcon (AU)	ADE; R1; 16	ADE; R2; 23	PHI; R3; DNQ	PHI; R4; DNQ	EAS; R5; DNQ	EAS; R6; DNQ	EAS; R7; DNQ	HDV; R8; 30	HDV; R9; 21	HDV; R10; 21	CAN; R11; 23	CAN; R12; Ret	CAN; R13; 14	BAR; R14; 27	BAR; R15; 29	BAR; R16; 28	ORA; R17; 23	ORA; R18; 16	WIN; R19; Ret	WIN; R20; 31	QLD; R21; 21	BAT; R22; 12	SUR; R23; 20	SUR; R24; 16	PUK; R25; 25	PUK; R26; 22	PUK; R27; 16	SAN; R28	SAN; R29						31st	321
2003	Paul Little Racing	Ford Falcon (AU)	ADE; R1; 19	ADE; R1; Ret	PHI; R3; 24	EAS; R4; Ret	WIN; R5; 16	BAR; R6; 31	BAR; R7; 21	BAR; R8; 24	HDV; R9; 25	HDV; R10; Ret	HDV; R11; DNS	QLD; R12; 19	ORA; R13	SAN; R14	BAT; R15	SUR; R16	SUR; R17	PUK; R18	PUK; R19	PUK; R20	EAS; R21	EAS; R22													31st	678
2003	Paul Little Racing	Ford Falcon (BA)	ADE; R1	ADE; R1	PHI; R3	EAS; R4	WIN; R5	BAR; R6	BAR; R7	BAR; R8	HDV; R9	HDV; R10	HDV; R11	QLD; R12	ORA; R13; Ret	SAN; R14; 30	BAT; R15; Ret	SUR; R16; 24	SUR; R17; 20	PUK; R18; Ret	PUK; R19; 25	PUK; R20; 24	EAS; R21; 27	EAS; R22; 17													31st	678
2004	Paul Little Racing	Holden Commodore (VY)	ADE; R1; Ret	ADE; R2; 13	EAS; R3; 26	PUK; R4; 22	PUK; R5; 19	PUK; R6; 16	HDV; R7; 24	HDV; R8; 30	HDV; R9; Ret	BAR; R10; 25	BAR; R11; 22	BAR; R12; 24	QLD; R13; 11	WIN; R14; 14	ORA; R15; 22	ORA; R16; 24	SAN; R17; 12	BAT; R18; 18	SUR; R19; 17	SUR; R20; 20	SYM; R21; 21	SYM; R22; 26	SYM; R23; 22	EAS; R24; 20	EAS; R25; 26	EAS; R26; 25									23rd	1047
2005	Paul Little Racing	Holden Commodore (VY)	ADE; R1; 21	ADE; R2; 24	PUK; R3; 23	PUK; R4; 23	PUK; R5; 18	BAR; R6; 23	BAR; R7; 26	BAR; R8; 23	EAS; R9; 24	EAS; R10; Ret	SHA; R11; 28	SHA; R12; 25	SHA; R13; 16	HDV; R14; Ret	HDV; R15; 25	HDV; R16; Ret	QLD; R17; Ret	ORA; R18; 22	ORA; R19; 21	SAN; R20; 25	BAT; R21; Ret	SUR; R22; 18	SUR; R23; Ret	SUR; R24; 30	SYM; R25; 28	SYM; R26; 31	SYM; R27; 32	PHI; R28; Wth	PHI; R29; Wth	PHI; R30; Wth					31st	511
2006	HSV Dealer Team	Holden Commodore (VZ)	ADE; R1	ADE; R2	PUK; R3	PUK; R4	PUK; R5	BAR; R6	BAR; R7	BAR; R8	WIN; R9	WIN; R10	WIN; R11	HDV; R12	HDV; R13	HDV; R14	QLD; R15	QLD; R16	QLD; R17	ORA; R18	ORA; R19	ORA; R20	SAN; R21; 16	BAT; R22; Ret	SUR; R23	SUR; R24	SUR; R25	SYM; R26	SYM; R27	SYM; R28	BHR; R29	BHR; R30	BHR; R31	PHI; R32	PHI; R33	PHI; R34	53rd	170

=== Complete Bathurst 1000 results ===
Year	Team	Car	Drivers	Position	Laps
1997	Wayne Gardner Racing	Holden Commodore VS	(Australia) Peter Bradbury (Australia) Paul Stokell	DNF	16
1998	Paul Little Racing	Ford Falcon EL	(Australia) Robert Jones (Australia) Garry Waldon	DNF	47
1999	Paul Little Racing	Ford Falcon AU	(Australia) Alan Jones	DNF	147
2000	Paul Little Racing	Ford Falcon AU	(Australia) Alan Jones	DNF	150
2001	Paul Little Racing	Ford Falcon AU	(Australia) Alan Jones	15th	158
2002	Paul Little Racing	Ford Falcon AU	(Australia) Paul Stokell	12th	160
2003	Paul Little Racing	Ford Falcon BA	(Australia) Paul Stokell	DNF	106
2004	Paul Little Racing	Holden Commodore VY	(Australia) Tomas Mezera	18th	157
2005	Paul Little Racing	Holden Commodore VY	(Australia) Tony Evangelou	DNF	92
2006	HSV Dealer Team	Holden Commodore VZ	(Australia) Tony D'Alberto	DNF	93
