= Larkham Motorsport =

- Team Principal: Mark Larkham
- Debut: 1995
- Final Season: 2005
- Round wins: 0
- Pole positions: 1
- 2005 position: 13th (1,567 points)

Larkham Motorsport was a motorsport team contesting the V8 Supercar Championship between 1995 and 2005.

== History ==
Larkham Motorsport was formed in 1990 with the intent of furthering Mark Larkham's career after he won the 1989 Australian Formula Ford Championship. After originally running a Ford EA Falcon in the Australian Production Car Championship with little success, Larkham returned to open wheelers and purchased a Ralt RT20 Formula Holden to run in the 1991 Australian Drivers' Championship. Finishing third he created a rivalry with series champion Mark Skaife which would continue for much of the next decade. For 1992 a relaxation in the rules governing what Formula Holden cars could be built from saw Larkham be the first to import a carbon-fibre constructed racing car to Australia in a Reynard 90D, adapted to the regulations by team mechanic Sam Michael. Using this car Larkham would spend the next two seasons as runner-up to Skaife. After the 1993 season Larkham sold his car and spent 18 months planning his return to racing.

== V8 Supercars ==
With support from Mitre 10, Ford and Yokohama, Larkham entered V8 Supercars with a Ford Falcon EF debuting at round 3 of the 1995 Australian Touring Car Championship. Rather than purchasing a car from a larger team, the team elected to build its own car. The design was quite different from other cars of the era, with some open-wheel style thinking incorporated into its design. Although ultimately unsuccessful, the concept would later be adopted by other teams.

For 1997, Larkham concluded a deal to race a customer Stone Brothers Racing Falcon EL on Bridgestone tyres. After a third-place finish at the Bathurst 1000, in 1998, Larkham won at the non-championship Indy Surfers Paradise race.

For 1999, while still having an association with Stone Brothers Racing, including racing a Falcon AU built by them, Larkham again went out on his own. At the end of 2000, Mitre 10 concluded its sponsorship. After a series of short term deals in 2001, Orrcon Steel joined as title sponsor in 2002.

In 2003, the team expanded to two cars with Jason Bargwanna joining. At the end of 2003 Larkham retired and was replaced by Mark Winterbottom. In October 2005, the team announced that Bargwanna and Winterbottom had been re-signed for the 2006 season. However within a month, Larkham had accepted an offer from Ford Performance Racing to buy-out Winterbottom's contract. Larkham also accepted an offer from V8 Supercars to purchase his RECs as part of its plan to reduce the size of the grid. Bargwanna and Orrcon joined WPS Racing with Mark Larkham becoming the team manager for a brief period.

== Drivers ==
- Mark Larkham (1995-2004)
- Warwick Rooklyn (1995)
- Cameron McConville (1996)
- Andrew Miedecke (1997)
- Brad Jones (1998/99)
- Geoff Brabham (2000)
- Alain Menu (2000, 2005)
- Wayne Gardner (2001)
- Will Power (2002)
- Jason Bargwanna (2003-05)
- Grant Johnson (2003)
- Kerry Wade (2003)
- Mark Winterbottom (2004/05)
- Matt Halliday (2004/05)
