= 2001 V8 Supercar season =

Seasons
- ← 2000 2002 →

The 2001 V8 Supercar season was the 42nd year of touring car racing in Australia since the first runnings of the Australian Touring Car Championship and the fore-runner of the present day Bathurst 1000, the Armstrong 500.

There were 22 touring car race meetings held during 2001; a thirteen-round series for V8 Supercars, the 2001 Shell Championship Series (SCS), two of them endurance races; a six-round second tier V8 Supercar series 2001 Konica V8 Supercar Series (KVS) along with a non-point scoring race supporting the Bathurst 1000 and V8 Supercar support programme events at the 2001 Australian Grand Prix and 2001 Honda Indy 300.

== Results and standings ==
=== Race calendar ===
The 2001 Australian touring car season consisted of 22 events.

Date	Series	Circuit	City / State	Winner	Team	Car	Report
26 Mar	KVS Round 1	Wakefield Park	Goulburn, New South Wales	Simon Wills	Team Dynamik	Holden VT Commodore	
2–4 Mar	Hot Wheels V8 Supercar Showdown	Albert Park street circuit	Melbourne, Victoria	Paul Radisich	Dick Johnson Racing	Ford AU Falcon	report
18 Mar	KVS Round 2	Oran Park Raceway	Sydney, New South Wales	David Parsons	Gibson Motorsport	Holden VT Commodore	
25 Mar	SCS Round 1	Phillip Island Grand Prix Circuit	Phillip Island, Victoria	Mark Skaife	Holden Racing Team	Holden VX Commodore	
7–8 Apr	Clipsal 500 SCS Round 2	Adelaide Street Circuit	Adelaide, South Australia	Jason Bright	Holden Racing Team	Holden VX Commodore	report
29 Apr	SCS Round 3	Eastern Creek Raceway	Sydney, New South Wales	Mark Skaife	Holden Racing Team	Holden VX Commodore	
6 May	KVS Round 3	Winton Motor Raceway	Benalla, Victoria	Owen Kelly	John Faulkner Racing	Holden VS Commodore	
12–13 May	SCS Round 4	Hidden Valley Raceway	Darwin, Northern Territory	Marcos Ambrose	Stone Brothers Racing	Ford AU Falcon	
27 May	KVS Round 4	Phillip Island Grand Prix Circuit	Phillip Island, Victoria	David Parsons	Gibson Motorsport	Holden VT Commodore	
9–10 Jun	SCS Round 5	Canberra Street Circuit	Canberra, Australian Capital Territory	Steven Johnson	Dick Johnson Racing	Ford AU Falcon	
23–24 Jun	SCS Round 6	Barbagallo Raceway	Perth, Western Australia	Paul Radisich	Dick Johnson Racing	Ford AU Falcon	
8 Jul	KVS Round 5	Lakeside International Raceway	Brisbane, Queensland	Paul Dumbrell	Gibson Motorsport	Holden VT Commodore	
15 Jul	SCS Round 7	Calder Park Raceway	Melbourne, Victoria	Paul Morris	Paul Morris Motorsport	Holden VT Commodore	
29 Jul	SCS Round 8	Oran Park Raceway	Sydney, New South Wales	Mark Skaife	Holden Racing Team	Holden VX Commodore	
11 Aug	KVS Round 6	Mallala Motor Sport Park	Adelaide, South Australia	Simon Wills	Team Dynamik	Holden VT Commodore	
26 Aug	VIP Pet Foods Queensland 500 SCS Round 9	Queensland Raceway	Ipswich, Queensland	Paul Radisich; Steven Johnson	Dick Johnson Racing	Ford AU Falcon	report
9 Sep	SCSRound 10	Winton Motor Raceway	Benalla, Victoria	Russell Ingall	Perkins Engineering	Holden VX Commodore	
6–7 Oct	Konica V8 Supercar Challenge Race	Mount Panorama Circuit	Bathurst, New South Wales	Wayne Wakefield	Graphic Skills Racing	Holden VS Commodore	report
6–7 Oct	V8Supercar Bathurst 1000 SCS Round 11	Mount Panorama Circuit	Bathurst, New South Wales	Mark Skaife; Tony Longhurst	Holden Racing Team	Holden VX Commodore	report
27–28 Oct	Cabcharge V8Supercar Challenge	Surfers Paradise Street Circuit	Surfers Paradise, Queensland	Garth Tander	Garry Rogers Motorsport	Holden VX Commodore	report
10–11 Nov	Boost Mobile V8 International SCS Round 12	Pukekohe Park Raceway	Pukekohe, New Zealand	Greg Murphy	K-Mart Racing Team	Holden VX Commodore	
1–2 Dec	Australian V8 Ultimate SCS Round 13	Sandown Raceway	Melbourne, Victoria	Todd Kelly	K-Mart Racing Team	Holden VX Commodore	

=== Hot Wheels V8 Supercar Showdown ===
This meeting was a support event of the 2001 Australian Grand Prix.

Driver	No.	Team	Car	Race 1	Race 2	Race 3
(New Zealand) Paul Radisich	18	Dick Johnson Racing	Ford AU Falcon	4	1	1
(Australia) Craig Lowndes	00	Gibson Motorsport	Ford AU Falcon	12	3	2
(Australia) Russell Ingall	8	Perkins Engineering	Holden VX Commodore	6	6	3
(Australia) Glenn Seton	5	Ford Tickford Racing	Ford AU Falcon	9	7	4
(Australia) Todd Kelly	15	K-Mart Racing Team	Holden VT Commodore	11	5	5
(Australia) John Bowe	60	PAE Motorsport	Ford AU Falcon	8	4	6
(Australia) Paul Weel	43	K&J Thermal Products Racing	Ford AU Falcon	21	8	7
(Australia) Steve Ellery	31	Steven Ellery Racing	Ford AU Falcon	DNF	13	8
(Australia) Cameron McLean	40	Paragon Motorsport	Ford AU Falcon	DNF	11	9
(Australia) Marcos Ambrose	4	Pirtek Racing	Ford AU Falcon	7	21	10
(Australia) Jason Bright	2	Holden Racing Team	Holden VX Commodore	3	DNF	11
(Australia) Mark Skaife	1	Holden Racing Team	Holden VX Commodore	1	DNF	12
(Australia) Garth Tander	34	Garry Rogers Motorsport	Holden VX Commodore	5	DNF	13
(Australia) Brad Jones	21	Ozemail Racing	Ford AU Falcon	17	10	14
(Australia) Dugal McDougall	16	Pepsi-Cola Racing	Holden VT Commodore	18	12	15
(Australia) Steven Johnson	17	Shell Helix Racing	Ford AU Falcon	2	DNF	16
(New Zealand) John Faulkner	46	John Faulkner Racing	Holden VT Commodore	16	DNF	17
(Australia) Tony Longhurst	54	Rod Nash Racing	Holden VT Commodore	19	15	18
(Australia) Anthony Tratt	75	Toll Racing	Ford AU Falcon	24	20	19
(Australia) Cameron McConville	3	Lansvale Racing Team	Holden VT Commodore	DNF	22	20
(Australia) Larry Perkins	11	Perkins Engineering	Holden VX Commodore	DNF	14	21
(Australia) Rodney Forbes	28	Gibson Motorsport	Ford AU Falcon	23	24	22
(Australia) Trevor Ashby	23	Lansvale Racing Team	Holden VS Commodore	DNF	23	23
(Australia) Paul Romano	24	Romano Racing	Holden VS Commodore	20	DNF	24
(Australia) Paul Morris	29	Paul Morris Motorsport	Holden VT Commodore	DNF	DNF	DNF
(Australia) David Besnard	9	Caltex Racing	Ford AU Falcon	15	9	DNF
(New Zealand) Jason Richards	69	Team Kiwi Racing	Holden VT Commodore	DNF	19	DNF
(Australia) Mark Larkham	10	Larkham Motor Sport	Ford AU Falcon	14	16	DNF
(New Zealand) Steven Richards	6	Ford Tickford Racing	Ford AU Falcon	10	2	DNF
(Australia) Tomas Mezera	32	Tomas Mezera Motorsport	Holden VX Commodore	22	17	DNF
(Australia) Jason Bargwanna	35	Garry Rogers Motorsport	Holden VX Commodore	13	18	DNF

=== Konica V8Supercar Challenge Race ===
This race was a support event of the 2001 V8 Supercar 1000.

Driver	No.	Team	Car	Grid	Race
(Australia) Wayne Wakefield	97	Graphic Skills Racing	Holden VS Commodore	1	1
(Australia) Matthew White	76	Matthew White Racing	Holden VS Commodore	2	2
(Australia) Kevin Mundy	89	Harris Racing	Ford AU Falcon	4	3
(Australia) Michael Simpson	93	Michael Simpson Racing	Ford EL Falcon	3	4
(Australia) Stephen Voight	59	John Scotcher Motorsport	Ford EL Falcon	9	5
(Australia) Ron Searle	95	Phoenix Motorsport	Holden VS Commodore	10	6
(Australia) Richard Mork	77	V8 Racing	Holden VS Commodore	12	7
(Australia) Daniel Miller	84	Miller Racing	Holden VS Commodore	7	8
(Australia) Mathew Hunt	38	South Pacific Motor Sport	Holden VS Commodore	17	9
(Australia) Bill Attard	37	Scotty Taylor Racing	Holden VS Commodore	19	10
(Australia) Robert Jones	69	Spiess Heckler Racing	Holden VS Commodore	15	11
(Australia) Mal Rose	44	Mal Rose Racing	Holden VS Commodore	5	DNF
(Australia) Rod Salmon	87		Ford EL Falcon	6	DNF
(Australia) Luke Sieders	42	All Trans Racing	Ford EL Falcon	11	DNF
(Australia) Tim Sipp	70	Graphic Skills Racing	Holden VS Commodore	14	DNF
(Australia) Ric Shaw	90	Ric Shaw Racing	Holden VS Commodore	20	DNF
(Australia) Phill Foster	60	Evers Motorsport	Holden VS Commodore	16	DNF
(Australia) Dean Crosswell	13	Imrie Motor Sport	Holden VS Commodore	8	DNF
(Australia) Tim Rowse	81	Rowse Motorsport	Holden VS Commodore	13	DNS
(Australia) Wesley May	99	AJG Racing	Holden VS Commodore	18	DNS
(New Zealand) Ashley Stichbury	67	Paul Morris Motorsport	Holden VS Commodore	DNQ	DNS

=== Cabcharge V8Supercar Challenge ===
This meeting was a support event of the 2001 Honda Indy 300.

Driver	No.	Team	Car	Top Ten	Race 1	Race 2	Race 3	Points
(Australia) Garth Tander	34	Garry Rogers Motorsport	Holden VX Commodore	1	1	2	1	278
(Australia) Mark Skaife	1	Holden Racing Team	Holden VX Commodore	3	2	1	2	264
(Australia) Russell Ingall	8	Perkins Engineering	Holden VX Commodore		4	3	3	210
(Australia) Larry Perkins	11	Perkins Engineering	Holden VS Commodore	4	5	4	4	207
(New Zealand) John Faulkner	46	John Faulkner Racing	Holden VT Commodore		6	5	6	178
(Australia) Steven Johnson	17	Dick Johnson Racing	Ford AU Falcon	8	10	6	5	175
(Australia) Steven Richards	6	Ford Tickford Racing	Ford AU Falcon		7	7	7	162
(Australia) Glenn Seton	5	Ford Tickford Racing	Ford AU Falcon	6	3	DNF	16	139
(Australia) Tony Longhurst	54	Rod Nash Racing	Holden VT Commodore		8	16	10	130
(Australia) Marcos Ambrose	4	Stone Brothers Racing	Ford AU Falcon		18	9	8	128
(Australia) David Besnard	9	Stone Brothers Racing	Ford AU Falcon	7	13	17	15	118
(Australia) Mark Larkham	10	Larkham Motor Sport	Ford AU Falcon	10	12	20	12	117
(Australia) Jason Bargwanna	35	Garry Rogers Motorsport	Holden VX Commodore	9	15	8	22	116
(Australia) Brad Jones	21	Brad Jones Racing	Ford AU Falcon		21	13	11	108
(Australia) Cameron McConville	3	Lansvale Racing Team	Holden VX Commodore		DNF	14	9	106
(Australia) Rodney Forbes	7	Gibson Motorsport	Ford AU Falcon		14	15	17	106
(Australia) Paul Weel	43	Paul Weel Racing	Ford AU Falcon		17	10	19	106
(New Zealand) Paul Radisich	18	Dick Johnson Racing	Ford AU Falcon	5	DNF	11	20	98
(Australia) Paul Romano	24	Romano Racing	Holden VT Commodore		16	18	18	94
(New Zealand) Greg Murphy	51	K-Mart Racing Team	Holden VX Commodore		9	12	DNF	90
(Australia) Todd Kelly	15	K-Mart Racing Team	Holden VX Commodore		11	DNF	14	82
(Australia) Craig Lowndes	00	Gibson Motorsport	Ford AU Falcon	2	DNF	DNS	13	74
(Australia) Anthony Tratt	75	Paul Little Racing	Ford AU Falcon		20	DNF	21	70
(Australia) Steve Ellery	31	Steven Ellery Racing	Ford AU Falcon		19	DNF	24	70
(Australia) Paul Morris	29	Paul Morris Motorsport	Holden VX Commodore		DNF	19	DNF	66
(Australia) Tomas Mezera	14	Imrie Motor Sport	Holden VT Commodore		DNF	DNS	23	34
(Australia) Jason Bright	2	Holden Racing Team	Holden VX Commodore		DNS	DNS	DNS	
