= 1999 V8 Supercars Launceston round =

(Tasmania) 1999 Oran Park V8 Supercar round
Event Information
- Round 9 of 13 in the 1999 Shell Championship Series
- Date: 6–8 August 1999
- Location: Launceston, Tasmania
- Venue: Symmons Plains Raceway
- Weather: Overcast, Light Rain

Results
Race 1
Distance	24 laps	50 km
Pole position	Paul Radisich; Dick Johnson Racing	0:53.4381
Winner	Greg Murphy; Gibson Motorsport	24:48.0020
Race 2
Distance	25 laps	50 km
Winner	Mark Skaife; Holden Racing Team	27:33.7757
Race 3
Distance	23 laps	50 km
Winner	Mark Skaife; Holden Racing Team	25:43.4972
Round Results
First	Mark Skaife; Holden Racing Team	146 pts
Second	Jason Bargwanna; Gibson Motorsport	132 pts
Third	Russell Ingall; Perkins Engineering	122 pts

The 1999 Symmons Plains V8 Supercar round was the ninth round of the 1999 Shell Championship Series. It was held on the weekend of 6 to 8 August at Symmons Plains Raceway in Launceston, Tasmania.

== Background ==
Craig Lowndes was absent from the Symmons Plains round following his accident in the previous round at Calder Park, where he sustained injuries.

== Race results ==
=== Qualifying ===
Pos	No	Name	Team	Vehicle	Time
1	18	(New Zealand) Paul Radisich	Dick Johnson Racing	Ford Falcon (AU)	053.4381
2	12	(New Zealand) Greg Murphy	Gibson Motorsport	Holden Commodore (VT)	53.5134
3	2	(Australia) Mark Skaife	Holden Racing Team	Holden Commodore (VT)	53.5885
4	6	(Australia) Neil Crompton	Glenn Seton Racing	Ford Falcon (AU)	53.5946
5	4	(Australia) Jason Bright	Stone Brothers Racing	Ford Falcon (AU)	53.6079
6	35	(Australia) Jason Bargwanna	Garry Rogers Motorsport	Holden Commodore (VT)	53.7319
7	40	(Australia) Cameron McLean	Greenfield Mowers Racing	Ford Falcon (EL)	53.7775
8	15	(Australia) Cameron McConville	Holden Racing Team	Holden Commodore (VS)	53.8103
9	34	(Australia) Garth Tander	Garry Rogers Motorsport	Holden Commodore (VS)	53.8107
10	8	(Australia) Russell Ingall	Perkins Engineering	Holden Commodore (VT)	53.8251
11	10	(Australia) Mark Larkham	Larkham Motorsport	Ford Falcon (AU)	53.8756
12	600	(Australia) John Bowe	PAE Motorsport	Ford Falcon (AU)	53.9175
13	5	(Australia) Glenn Seton	Glenn Seton Racing	Ford Falcon (AU)	53.9196
14	17	(Australia) Dick Johnson	Dick Johnson Racing	Ford Falcon (AU)	53.9735
15	7	(New Zealand) Steven Richards	Gibson Motorsport	Holden Commodore (VT)	54.0436
16	25	(Australia) Tony Longhurst	Longhurst Racing	Ford Falcon (AU)	54.0870
17	46	(New Zealand) John Faulkner	John Faulkner Racing	Holden Commodore (VT)	54.1761
18	66	(Australia) Mark Poole	James Rosenberg Racing	Holden Commodore (VT)	54.2125
19	24	(Australia) Paul Romano	Romano Racing	Holden Commodore (VS)	54.2644
20	11	(Australia) Larry Perkins	Perkins Engineering	Holden Commodore (VT)	54.3549
21	28	(Australia) Rodney Forbes	Bob Forbes Racing	Holden Commodore (VS)	54.5116
22	73	(Australia) David Parsons	Challenge Recruitment	Holden Commodore (VS)	54.6194
23	16	(Australia) Dugal McDougall	McDougall Motorsport	Holden Commodore (VT)	54.6203
24	3	(Australia) Steve Reed	Lansvale Racing Team	Holden Commodore (VS)	54.6583
25	43	(Australia) Paul Weel	Paul Weel Racing	Ford Falcon (AU)	54.9022
26	98	(Australia) David Parsons	Challenge Recruitment	Holden Commodore (VS)	55.0695
27	75	(Australia) Anthony Tratt	Paul Little Racing	Ford Falcon (AU)	55.1572
28	49	(Australia) Layton Crambrook	Crambrook Racing	Holden Commodore (VS)	55.4286
29	96	(Australia) Paul Dumbrell	John Faulkner Racing	Holden Commodore (VS)	55.7524
30	14	(Australia) Mike Imrie	Imrie Motorsport	Holden Commodore (VS)	56.5527

=== Privateers Race ===
Pos.	No.	Name	Team	Vehicle	Laps	Time	Grid
1	40	(Australia) Cameron McLean	Greenfield Mowers Racing	Ford Falcon (EL)	15	13:56.7694	1
2	28	(Australia) Rodney Forbes	Bob Forbes Racing	Holden Commodore (VS)	15	+ 4.617	2
3	3	(Australia) Steve Reed	Lansvale Racing Team	Holden Commodore (VS)	15	+ 7.185	4
4	98	(Australia) David 'Skippy' Parsons	Owen Parkinson Racing	Holden Commodore (VS)	15	+ 19.513	5
5	14	(Australia) Mike Imrie	Imrie Motorsport	Holden Commodore (VS)	15	+ 31.714	7
Ret	73	(Australia) David 'Truckie' Parsons	Gibson Motorsport	Holden Commodore (VS)	7	Retired	3
Ret	49	(Australia) Layton Crambrook	Crambrook Racing	Holden Commodore (VS)	7	Retired	6
Fastest Lap: Rodney Forbes (Bob Forbes Racing) - 54.5915 on lap 8

=== Race 1 ===
Pos.	No.	Name	Team	Vehicle	Laps	Time	Grid
1	12	(New Zealand) Greg Murphy	Gibson Motorsport	Holden Commodore (VT)	24	24:48.0020	
2	2	(Australia) Mark Skaife	Holden Racing Team	Holden Commodore (VT)	24		
3	6	(Australia) Neil Crompton	Glenn Seton Racing	Ford Falcon (AU)	24		
4	35	(Australia) Jason Bargwanna	Garry Rogers Motorsport	Holden Commodore (VT)	24		
5	4	(Australia) Jason Bright	Stone Brothers Racing	Ford Falcon (AU)	24		
6	15	(Australia) Cameron McConville	Holden Racing Team	Holden Commodore (VS)	24		
7	8	(Australia) Russell Ingall	Perkins Engineering	Holden Commodore (VT)	24		
8	34	(Australia) Garth Tander	Garry Rogers Motorsport	Holden Commodore (VS)	24		
9	40	(Australia) Cameron McLean	Greenfield Mowers Racing	Ford Falcon (EL)	24		
10	5	(Australia) Glenn Seton	Glenn Seton Racing	Ford Falcon (AU)	24		
11	7	(New Zealand) Steven Richards	Gibson Motorsport	Holden Commodore (VT)	24		
12	25	(Australia) Tony Longhurst	Longhurst Racing	Ford Falcon (AU)	24		
13	28	(Australia) Rodney Forbes	Bob Forbes Racing	Holden Commodore (VS)	24		
14	11	(Australia) Larry Perkins	Perkins Engineering	Holden Commodore (VT)	24		
15	10	(Australia) Mark Larkham	Larkham Motorsport	Ford Falcon (AU)	24		
16	600	(Australia) John Bowe	PAE Motorsport	Ford Falcon (AU)	24		
17	73	(Australia) David 'Truckie' Parsons	Gibson Motorsport	Holden Commodore (VS)	24		
18	3	(Australia) Steve Reed	Lansvale Racing Team	Holden Commodore (VS)	24		
19	46	(New Zealand) John Faulkner	John Faulkner Racing	Holden Commodore (VT)	24		
20	24	(Australia) Paul Romano	Romano Racing	Holden Commodore (VS)	24		
21	98	(Australia) David 'Skippy' Parsons	Owen Parkinson Racing	Holden Commodore (VS)	24		
22	49	(Australia) Layton Crambrook	Crambrook Racing	Holden Commodore (VS)	24		
23	43	(Australia) Paul Weel	Paul Weel Racing	Ford Falcon (AU)	24		
24	66	(Australia) Mark Poole	James Rosenberg Racing	Holden Commodore (VT)	24		
25	75	(Australia) Anthony Tratt	Paul Little Racing	Ford Falcon (AU)	24		
26	96	(Australia) Paul Dumbrell	John Faulkner Racing	Holden Commodore (VS)	23	+ 1 lap	
27	14	(Australia) Mike Imrie	Imrie Motorsport	Holden Commodore (VS)	23	+ 1 lap	
28	16	(Australia) Dugal McDougall	McDougall Motorsport	Holden Commodore (VT)	23	+ 1 lap	
Ret	18	(New Zealand) Paul Radisich	Dick Johnson Racing	Ford Falcon (AU)	23	Retired	
Ret	17	(Australia) Dick Johnson	Dick Johnson Racing	Ford Falcon (AU)	2	Retired	
DNS	79	(Australia) Mike Conway	Cadillac Productions	Ford Falcon (EL)		Did not start	
Fastest Lap: Greg Murphy (Gibson Motorsport) - 57.1928 on lap 13

=== Race 2 ===
Pos.	No.	Name	Team	Vehicle	Laps	Time	Grid
1	2	(Australia) Mark Skaife	Holden Racing Team	Holden Commodore (VT)	25	27:33.7757	
2	35	(Australia) Jason Bargwanna	Garry Rogers Motorsport	Holden Commodore (VT)	25		
3	6	(Australia) Neil Crompton	Glenn Seton Racing	Ford Falcon (AU)	25		
4	34	(Australia) Garth Tander	Garry Rogers Motorsport	Holden Commodore (VS)	25		
5	8	(Australia) Russell Ingall	Perkins Engineering	Holden Commodore (VT)	25		
6	5	(Australia) Glenn Seton	Glenn Seton Racing	Ford Falcon (AU)	25		
7	15	(Australia) Cameron McConville	Holden Racing Team	Holden Commodore (VS)	25		
8	7	(New Zealand) Steven Richards	Gibson Motorsport	Holden Commodore (VT)	25		
9	600	(Australia) John Bowe	PAE Motorsport	Ford Falcon (AU)	25		
10	12	(New Zealand) Greg Murphy	Gibson Motorsport	Holden Commodore (VT)	25		
11	11	(Australia) Larry Perkins	Perkins Engineering	Holden Commodore (VT)	25		
12	46	(New Zealand) John Faulkner	John Faulkner Racing	Holden Commodore (VT)	25		
13	40	(Australia) Cameron McLean	Greenfield Mowers Racing	Ford Falcon (EL)	25		
14	43	(Australia) Paul Weel	Paul Weel Racing	Ford Falcon (AU)	25		
15	49	(Australia) Layton Crambrook	Crambrook Racing	Holden Commodore (VS)	25		
16	17	(Australia) Dick Johnson	Dick Johnson Racing	Ford Falcon (AU)	25		
17	25	(Australia) Tony Longhurst	Longhurst Racing	Ford Falcon (AU)	25		
18	3	(Australia) Steve Reed	Lansvale Racing Team	Holden Commodore (VS)	25		
19	75	(Australia) Anthony Tratt	Paul Little Racing	Ford Falcon (AU)	25		
20	24	(Australia) Paul Romano	Romano Racing	Holden Commodore (VS)	25		
21	73	(Australia) David 'Truckie' Parsons	Gibson Motorsport	Holden Commodore (VS)	25		
22	28	(Australia) Rodney Forbes	Bob Forbes Racing	Holden Commodore (VS)	24	+ 1 lap	
23	16	(Australia) Dugal McDougall	McDougall Motorsport	Holden Commodore (VT)	24	+ 1 lap	
24	98	(Australia) David 'Skippy' Parsons	Owen Parkinson Racing	Holden Commodore (VS)	22	+ 3 laps	
25	14	(Australia) Mike Imrie	Imrie Motorsport	Holden Commodore (VS)	20	+ 5 laps	
Ret	4	(Australia) Jason Bright	Stone Brothers Racing	Ford Falcon (AU)	21	Retired	
Ret	10	(Australia) Mark Larkham	Larkham Motorsport	Ford Falcon (AU)	20	Retired	
Ret	66	(Australia) Mark Poole	James Rosenberg Racing	Holden Commodore (VT)	7	Retired	
Ret	96	(Australia) Paul Dumbrell	John Faulkner Racing	Holden Commodore (VS)	7	Retired	
Ret	18	(New Zealand) Paul Radisich	Dick Johnson Racing	Ford Falcon (AU)	1	Retired	
DNS	79	(Australia) Mike Conway	Cadillac Productions	Ford Falcon (EL)		Did not start	
Fastest Lap: Russell Ingall (Perkins Engineering) - 58.0473 on lap 9

=== Race 3 ===
Pos.	No.	Name	Team	Vehicle	Laps	Time	Grid
1	2	(Australia) Mark Skaife	Holden Racing Team	Holden Commodore (VT)	23	25:43.4972	
2	8	(Australia) Russell Ingall	Perkins Engineering	Holden Commodore (VT)	23		
3	35	(Australia) Jason Bargwanna	Garry Rogers Motorsport	Holden Commodore (VT)	23		
4	5	(Australia) Glenn Seton	Glenn Seton Racing	Ford Falcon (AU)	23		
5	600	(Australia) John Bowe	PAE Motorsport	Ford Falcon (AU)	23		
6	11	(Australia) Larry Perkins	Perkins Engineering	Holden Commodore (VT)	23		
7	12	(New Zealand) Greg Murphy	Gibson Motorsport	Holden Commodore (VT)	23		
8	73	(Australia) David 'Truckie' Parsons	Gibson Motorsport	Holden Commodore (VS)	23		
9	17	(Australia) Dick Johnson	Dick Johnson Racing	Ford Falcon (AU)	23		
10	43	(Australia) Paul Weel	Paul Weel Racing	Ford Falcon (AU)	23		
11	25	(Australia) Tony Longhurst	Longhurst Racing	Ford Falcon (AU)	23		
12	24	(Australia) Paul Romano	Romano Racing	Holden Commodore (VS)	23		
13	10	(Australia) Mark Larkham	Larkham Motorsport	Ford Falcon (AU)	23		
14	4	(Australia) Jason Bright	Stone Brothers Racing	Ford Falcon (AU)	23		
15	98	(Australia) David 'Skippy' Parsons	Owen Parkinson Racing	Holden Commodore (VS)	23		
16	75	(Australia) Anthony Tratt	Paul Little Racing	Ford Falcon (AU)	22	+ 1 lap	
17	28	(Australia) Rodney Forbes	Bob Forbes Racing	Holden Commodore (VS)	22	+ 1 lap	
18	49	(Australia) Layton Crambrook	Crambrook Racing	Holden Commodore (VS)	22	+ 1 lap	
Ret	16	(Australia) Dugal McDougall	McDougall Motorsport	Holden Commodore (VT)	20	Retired	
Ret	34	(Australia) Garth Tander	Garry Rogers Motorsport	Holden Commodore (VS)	17	Retired	
Ret	3	(Australia) Steve Reed	Lansvale Racing Team	Holden Commodore (VS)	15	Retired	
Ret	40	(Australia) Cameron McLean	Greenfield Mowers Racing	Ford Falcon (EL)	14	Retired	
Ret	46	(New Zealand) John Faulkner	John Faulkner Racing	Holden Commodore (VT)	10	Retired	
Ret	66	(Australia) Mark Poole	James Rosenberg Racing	Holden Commodore (VT)	7	Retired	
Ret	6	(Australia) Neil Crompton	Glenn Seton Racing	Ford Falcon (AU)	4	Retired	
Ret	14	(Australia) Mike Imrie	Imrie Motorsport	Holden Commodore (VS)	4	Retired	
Ret	96	(Australia) Paul Dumbrell	John Faulkner Racing	Holden Commodore (VS)	3	Retired	
DNS	7	(New Zealand) Steven Richards	Gibson Motorsport	Holden Commodore (VT)		Did not start	
DNS	15	(Australia) Cameron McConville	Holden Racing Team	Holden Commodore (VS)		Did not start	
DNS	18	(New Zealand) Paul Radisich	Dick Johnson Racing	Ford Falcon (AU)		Did not start	
DNS	79	(Australia) Mike Conway	Cadillac Productions	Ford Falcon (EL)		Did not start	
Fastest Lap: Garth Tander (Garry Rogers Motorsport) - 58.6845 on lap 3
