= 1999 Queensland 500 =

Event Information
- Round 12 of 13 in the 1999 Shell Championship Series
- Date: 17–19 September 1999
- Location: Ipswich, Queensland
- Venue: Queensland Raceway
- Weather: Fine

Results
Race 1
Distance	161 laps	500 km
Pole position	Jason Bright; Stone Brothers Racing	1:10.2952
Winner	Larry Perkins; Russell Ingall; Perkins Engineering	3:29:44.6365
Round Results
First	Larry Perkins Russell Ingall; Perkins Engineering	300 pts
Second	Garth Tander Jason Bargwanna; Garry Rogers Motorsport	276 pts
Third	Craig Lowndes Mark Skaife; Holden Racing Team	264 pts

The 1999 Queensland 500 was an endurance race for V8 Supercars, held at Queensland Raceway, near Ipswich, in Queensland, Australia on 19 September 1999. The race, which was the inaugural Queensland 500, was Round 12 of the 1999 Shell Championship Series.

The race was won by Larry Perkins and Russell Ingall driving a Holden Commodore (VT).

== Results ==
=== Qualifying ===
Qualifying results:

Pos	No.	Driver	Team	Time
1	4	(Australia) Jason Bright (New Zealand) Craig Baird	Stone Brothers Racing	1:09.8946
2	1	(Australia) Craig Lowndes (Australia) Cameron McConville	Holden Racing Team	1:09.9013
3	18	(New Zealand) Paul Radisich (Australia) Steven Ellery	Dick Johnson Racing	1:10.3066
4	2	(Australia) Mark Skaife (Australia) Paul Morris	Holden Racing Team	1:10.3117
5	34	(Australia) Garth Tander (Australia) Jason Bargwanna	Garry Rogers Motorsport	1:10.4587
6	11	(Australia) Larry Perkins (Australia) Russell Ingall	Perkins Engineering	1:10.6035
7	10	(Australia) Mark Larkham (Australia) Brad Jones	Larkham Motor Sport	1:10.6218
8	73	(Australia) David 'Truckie' Parsons (Australia) David 'Skippy' Parsons	Challenge Recruitment Racing	1:10.6985
9	7	(New Zealand) Steven Richards (New Zealand) Greg Murphy	Gibson Motorsport	1:10.7468
10	25	(Australia) Tony Longhurst (Australia) Adam Macrow	Longhurst Racing	1:10.8671
11	600	(Australia) John Bowe (New Zealand) Jim Richards	Briggs Motor Sport	1:10.8857
12	5	(Australia) Glenn Seton (Australia) Neil Crompton	Glenn Seton Racing	1:10.9039
13	17	(Australia) Dick Johnson (Australia) Steven Johnson	Dick Johnson Racing	1:10.9922
14	70	(Australia) John Briggs (Australia) Tim Leahey	Briggs Motor Sport	1:11.1680
15	24	(Australia) Paul Romano (Australia) Tomas Mezera	Romano Racing	1:11.2484
16	16	(Australia) Dugal McDougall (Australia) Andrew Miedecke	Perkins Engineering	1:11.2659
17	6	(Australia) Geoff Brabham (Australia) Neal Bates	Glenn Seton Racing	1:11.3275
18	46	(New Zealand) John Faulkner (New Zealand) Simon Wills	John Faulkner Racing	1:11.3659
19	40	(Australia) Cameron McLean (Australia) Wayne Park	Greenfields Mowers Racing	1:11.5287
20	28	(Australia) Rodney Forbes (Australia) Geoff Full	Rodney Forbes Racing	1:11.5977
21	35	(Australia) Matthew Coleman (Australia) Greg Ritter	Garry Rogers Motorsport	1:11.6303
22	15	(Australia) Todd Kelly (Australia) Mark Noske	Holden Young Lions	1:11.7372
23	3	(Australia) Trevor Ashby (Australia) Steve Reed	Lansvale Racing Team	1:11.7968
24	43	(Australia) Paul Weel (Australia) Greg Crick	Paul Weel Racing	1:11.8447
25	26	(Australia) John Cotter (Australia) Peter Doulman	M3 Motorsport	1:12.0861
26	66	(Australia) Mark Poole (Australia) Tony Scott	James Rosenberg Racing	1:12.1456
27	80	(Australia) Bob Thorn (Australia) Todd Wanless	Briggs Motor Sport	1:12.3286
28	22	(Australia) Danny Osborne (Australia) Brett Peters	Colourscan Motorsport	1:12.3773
29	97	(Australia) Wayne Wakefield (Australia) Dean Canto	Graphic Skills Racing	1:12.4254
30	96	(Australia) Paul Dumbrell (Australia) Matthew White	John Faulkner Racing	1:12.6061
31	49	(Australia) Layton Crambrook (Australia) Dean Crosswell	Crambrook Racing	1:12.7478
32	75	(Australia) Anthony Tratt (Australia) Alan Jones	Paul Little Racing	1:12.8091
33	55	(Australia) Rod Nash (Australia) Dean Wanless	Rod Nash Racing	1:12.8109
34	134	(Australia) Alan Heath (Australia) Warren Luff	Team South Australia	1:12.9223
35	54	(Australia) Simon Emerzidis (Australia) Gary Willmington	Simon's Earthworks	1:13.2246
36	14	(Australia) Mike Irmie (Australia) Rodney Crick	Saabwreck Motorsport	1:13.5804
37	47	(Australia) John Trimbole (Australia) Kevin Heffernan	Metropolis City Promotions	1:13.5850
38	50	(Australia) Melinda Price (Australia) Dean Lindstrom	Ultra Tune Racing	1:13.6370
39	48	(Australia) D'arcy Russell (Australia) Grany Johnson	Rod Smith Racing	1:14.1084
40	79	(Australia) Mike Conway (Australia) Ric Shaw	Cadillac Productions	1:14.2031
41	84	(Australia) Daniel Miller (Australia) Tony Ricciardello	Miller Racing	1:14.4924
42	39	(Australia) Chris Smerdon (Australia) Mal Rose	Smerdon Racing	1:16.6660

=== Top 10 Qualifying ===
Top 10 Qualifying results:

Pos	No.	Driver	Team	Time
1	4	(Australia) Jason Bright	Stone Brothers Racing	1:10.2952
2	34	(Australia) Garth Tander	Garry Rogers Motorsport	1:10.7549
3	2	(Australia) Mark Skaife	Holden Racing Team	1:10.8215
4	18	(New Zealand) Paul Radisich	Dick Johnson Racing	1:10.8350
5	1	(Australia) Craig Lowndes	Holden Racing Team	1:11.0101
6	11	(Australia) Larry Perkins	Perkins Engineering	1:11.1080
7	7	(New Zealand) Steven Richards	Gibson Motorsport	1:11.2981
8	73	(Australia) David Parsons	Challenge Recruitment Racing	1:11.4687
9	10	(Australia) Mark Larkham	Larkham Motor Sport	1:11.4863
10	25	(Australia) Tony Longhurst	Longhurst Racing	1:11.7786

=== Race ===
Level 1 teams raced in Class A. Level 2 teams, usually referred to as privateers, raced in Class B.

Race results:

Pos	No	Class	Team	Drivers	Car	Laps	Qual Pos	Top 10 Qual Pos	Series Points
1	11	A	Perkins Engineering	(Australia) Larry Perkins (Australia) Russell Ingall	Holden Commodore (VT)	161	6	6	300
2	34	A	Garry Rogers Motorsport	(Australia) Garth Tander (Australia) Jason Bargwanna	Holden Commodore (VT)	161	5	2	276
3	1	A	Holden Racing Team	(Australia) Craig Lowndes (Australia) Cameron McConville	Holden Commodore (VT)	161	2	5	264
4	5	A	Glenn Seton Racing	(Australia) Glenn Seton (Australia) Neil Crompton	Ford Falcon (AU)	161	12		252
5	73	B	Challenge Recruitment Racing	(Australia) David 'Truckie' Parsons (Australia) David 'Skippy' Parsons	Holden Commodore (VT)	161	8	8	240
6	7	A	Gibson Motorsport	(New Zealand) Steven Richards (New Zealand) Greg Murphy	Holden Commodore (VT)	161	9	7	228
7	17	A	Dick Johnson Racing	(Australia) Dick Johnson (Australia) Steven Johnson	Ford Falcon (AU)	160	13		216
8	3	B	Lansvale Racing Team	(Australia) Steve Reed (Australia) Trevor Ashby	Holden Commodore (VS)	160	23		204
9	46	A	John Faulkner Racing	(New Zealand) John Faulkner (New Zealand) Simon Wills	Holden Commodore (VT)	159	18		192
10	6	A	Glenn Seton Racing	(Australia) Geoff Brabham (Australia) Neal Bates	Ford Falcon (AU)	159	17		180
11	16	A	McDougall Motorsport	(Australia) Dugal McDougall (Australia) Andrew Miedecke	Holden Commodore (VT)	158	16		168
12	35	A	Garry Rogers Motorsport	(Australia) Greg Ritter (Australia) Matthew Coleman	Holden Commodore (VT)	158	21		156
13	49	B	Layton Crambrook	(Australia) Layton Crambrook (Australia) Dean Crosswell	Holden Commodore (VS)	158	31		144
14	43	A	Paul Weel Racing	(Australia) Paul Weel (Australia) Greg Crick	Ford Falcon (AU)	158	24		132
15	55	B	Rod Nash Racing	(Australia) Rod Nash (Australia) Dean Wanless	Holden Commodore (VS)	157	33		120
16	10	A	Larkham Motor Sport	(Australia) Mark Larkham (Australia) Brad Jones	Ford Falcon (AU)	157	7	9	108
17	75	A	Paul Little Racing	(Australia) Anthony Tratt (Australia) Alan Jones	Ford Falcon (AU)	157	32		96
18	600	A	Briggs Motor Sport	(Australia) John Bowe (New Zealand) Jim Richards	Ford Falcon (AU)	156	11		84
19	26	B	M3 Motorsport	(Australia) Peter Doulman (Australia) John Cotter	Holden Commodore (VT)	155	25		72
20	50	B	Clive Wiseman Racing	(Australia) Dean Lindstrom (Australia) Melinda Price	Holden Commodore (VS)	153	38		60
21	79	B	Cadillac Productions	(Australia) Mike Conway (Australia) Ric Shaw	Ford Falcon (EL)	153	40		48
22	2	A	Holden Racing Team	(Australia) Mark Skaife (Australia) Paul Morris	Holden Commodore (VT)	150	4	3	36
23	22	A	Colourscan Racing	(Australia) Danny Osborne (Australia) Brett Peters	Ford Falcon (EL)	147	28		24
24	54	B	Simon's Earthworks	(Australia) Simon Emerzidis (Australia) Garry Willmington	Ford Falcon (EL)	143	35		12
25	97	B	Graphic Skills Racing	(Australia) Wayne Wakefield (Australia) Dean Canto	Holden Commodore (VS)	133	29		6
26	47	B	Daily Planet Racing	(Australia) John Trimbole (Australia) Kevin Heffernan	Holden Commodore (VS)	126	37		
DNF	15	A	Holden Young Lions	(Australia) Todd Kelly (Australia) Mark Noske	Holden Commodore (VS)	155	22		
DNF	66	A	James Rosenberg Racing	(Australia) Mark Poole (Australia) Tony Scott	Holden Commodore (VT)	150	26		
DNF	28	B	Rodney Forbes Racing	(Australia) Rodney Forbes (Australia) Geoff Full	Holden Commodore (VS)	132	20		
DNF	24	A	Romano Racing	(Australia) Paul Romano (Australia) Tomas Mezera	Holden Commodore (VS)	127	15		
DNF	96	A	John Faulkner Racing	(Australia) Paul Dumbrell (Australia) Matthew White	Holden Commodore (VS)	125	30		
DNF	70	A	Briggs Motor Sport	(Australia) John Briggs (Australia) Tim Leahey	Ford Falcon (AU)	118	14		
DNF	4	A	Stone Brothers Racing	(Australia) Jason Bright (New Zealand) Craig Baird	Ford Falcon (AU)	111	1	1	
DNF	80	B	Briggs Motor Sport	(Australia) Bob Thorn (Australia) Todd Wanless	Ford Falcon (EL)	111	27		
DNF	40	B	Greenfield Mowers Racing	(Australia) Cameron McLean (Australia) Wayne Park	Ford Falcon (EL)	97	19		
DNF	134	B	Power Racing	(Australia) Alan Heath (Australia) Warren Luff	Ford Falcon (EL)	97	34		
DNF	48	B	Rod Smith Racing	(Australia) D'arcy Russell (Australia) Grant Johnson	Holden Commodore (VS)	75	39		
DNF	14	B	Imrie Motor Sport	(Australia) Mike Imrie (Australia) Rodney Crick	Holden Commodore (VS)	69	36		
DNF	25	A	Longhurst Racing	(Australia) Tony Longhurst (Australia) Adam Macrow	Ford Falcon (AU)	58	10	10	
DNF	18	A	Dick Johnson Racing	(New Zealand) Paul Radisich (Australia) Steve Ellery	Ford Falcon (AU)	56	3	4	
DNF	84	B	Miller Racing	(Australia) Daniel Miller (Australia) Tony Ricciardello	Holden Commodore (VS)	4	41		
DNF	39	B	Challenge Motorsport	(Australia) Chris Smerdon (Australia) Mal Rose	Holden Commodore (VS)	3	42		

=== Statistics ===
- Provisional Pole Position - #4 Jason Bright - 1:09.8946
- Pole Position - #4 Jason Bright - 1:10.2952
- Fastest Lap - #5 Glenn Seton - 1:11.8804
- Average Speed - 143.70 km/h
