= 2001 Konica V8 Supercar Series =

Motor racing competition

The 2001 Konica V8 Supercar Series was an Australian motor racing competition for V8 Supercars. It was the second running of the second tier series for V8 Supercars. The series was contested over six rounds held across four different states, commencing on 25 February at Wakefield Park and concluding on 11 August at Mallala Motor Sport Park.

The series was won by Simon Wills who was victorious in ten of the 18 races. Wills finished 82 points clear of Paul Dumbrell.

== Teams and drivers ==
The following teams and drivers competed during the series.

Team	Car	No.	Driver	Rounds
Eastern Creek Karts	Ford Falcon (EL)	20	(Australia) Garry Holt	All
Terry Wyhoon Racing	Holden Commodore (VS)	25	(Australia) Terry Wyhoon	All
Garry Rogers Motorsport	Holden Commodore (VT)	33	(Australia) Leanne Ferrier	All
Scotty Taylor Racing	Holden Commodore (VS)	37	(Australia) Bill Attard	All
South Pacific Motor Sport	Holden Commodore (VS)	38	(Australia) Peter Field	2, 4
South Pacific Motor Sport	Holden Commodore (VS)	38	(Australia) Wayne Cooper	3
Mal Rose Racing	Holden Commodore (VS)	44	(Australia) Mal Rose	1–2
Eddie Abelnica	Holden Commodore (VT)	48	(Australia) Eddie Abelnica	3–6
Ric Shaw Motorsport	Holden Commodore (VS)	49	(Australia) Ric Shaw	1–5
Garry Willmington Performance	Ford Falcon (EL)	56	(Australia) Luke Sieders	1–2
John Scotcher Motorsport	Ford Falcon (EL)	59	(Australia) Adam Wallis	1–2, 4, 6
John Scotcher Motorsport	Ford Falcon (EL)	59	(Australia) Mick Donaher	3, 5
Evers Motorsport	Holden Commodore (VS)	60	(Australia) Scott March	1–2
Evers Motorsport	Holden Commodore (VS)	60	(Australia) Kenny Habul	5
Halliday Motor Sport	Ford Falcon (EL)	61	(Australia) Ross Halliday	All
Simon Emerzidis	Ford Falcon (EL)	63	(Australia) Simon Emerzidis	4–5
Robert Smith Racing	Holden Commodore (VS)	72	(Australia) Robert Smith	3–4
Team Dynamik	Holden Commodore (VT)	73	(New Zealand) Simon Wills	All
V8 Racing	Holden Commodore (VS)	77	(Australia) Richard Mork	1–2
Gibson Motorsport	Holden Commodore VT	80	(Australia) Paul Dumbrell	All
Gibson Motorsport	Holden Commodore VT	82	(Australia) David Parsons	All
Rowse Motorsport	Holden Commodore (VS)	81	(Australia) Tim Rowse	All
Miller Racing	Holden Commodore (VS)	84	(Australia) Daniel Miller	1–4, 6
Harris Racing	Ford Falcon (AU)	88	(Australia) Craig Harris	1–3, 5–6
Harris Racing	Ford Falcon (AU)	88	(Australia) Michael Simpson	4
Harris Racing	Ford Falcon (AU)	89	(Australia) Kevin Mundy	All
NRC International	Holden Commodore (VT)	90	(Australia) Dale Brede	All
Michael Simpson Racing	Ford Falcon (EL)	93	(Australia) Michael Simpson	1–3, 5–6
John Faulkner Racing	Holden Commodore (VS)	96	(Australia) Owen Kelly	All
Graphic Skills Racing	Holden Commodore (VS)	97	(Australia) Wayne Wakefield	5
AJG Racing	Holden Commodore (VS)	99	(Australia) Wesley May	5
GM Motorsport	Holden Commodore (VS)	111	(Australia) Phonsy Mullan	1–3
RPM International Racing	Ford Falcon (EL)	145	(Australia) Geoff Full	1
RPM International Racing	Ford Falcon (EL)	145	(Australia) Greg Crick	2
RPM International Racing	Ford Falcon (EL)	145	(Australia) Aaron McGill	3–5
Power Racing	Ford Falcon (AU)	500	(Australia) Alan Heath	All
Prancing Horse Racing	Ford Falcon (AU)	888	(Australia) Mark Noske	6

== Series calendar ==
The series was contested over six rounds with three races per round.

Round	Date	Circuit	Location	Winning driver
1	24–25 February	(New South Wales) Wakefield Park	Goulburn, New South Wales	(New Zealand) Simon Wills
2	17–18 March	(New South Wales) Oran Park Raceway	Sydney, New South Wales	(Australia) David Parsons
3	5–6 May	(Victoria (state)) Winton Motor Raceway	Benalla, Victoria	(Australia) Owen Kelly
4	26–27 May	(Victoria (state)) Phillip Island Grand Prix Circuit	Phillip Island, Victoria	(Australia) David Parsons
5	7–8 July	(Queensland) Lakeside International Raceway	Brisbane, Queensland	(Australia) Paul Dumbrell
6	11–12 August	(South Australia) Mallala Motor Sport Park	Mallala, South Australia	(New Zealand) Simon Wills

An additional non-points "special event", the Konica V8 Supercar Challenge, was held at the Mount Panorama Circuit, Bathurst on 6 October as a support race to the 2001 V8 Supercar 1000.

== Points system ==
The season consisted of six rounds across four different states. Each round consisted of three races. Points were awarded for all cars who started each race in finishing order and then in order that they retired from the race. Points may have been offered for race positions lower than 24th but at no race during the series did more than 24 cars start.

Position	1st	2nd	3rd	4th	5th	6th	7th	8th	9th	10th	11th	12th	13th	14th	15th	16th	17th	18th	19th	20th	21st	22nd	23rd	24th
Points	90	80	72	66	62	58	54	50	48	46	44	42	40	38	36	34	32	30	28	26	24	22	20	18

== Series standings ==
Pos.	Driver	No.	WAK (New South Wales)			ORA (New South Wales)			WIN (Victoria (state))			PHI (Victoria (state))			LAK (Queensland)			MAL (South Australia)			Points
1	(New Zealand) Simon Wills	73	1	7	1	1	8	5	1	Ret (18)	DNS	9	1	1	1	5	4	1	1	1	1272
2	(Australia) Paul Dumbrell	80	10	1	7	3	7	6	11	2	2	6	3	2	9	1	1	2	Ret (17)	5	1190
3	(Australia) David Parsons	82	5	3	8	10	1	1	5	3	3	1	2	3	13	7	16	5	5	6	1168
4	(Australia) Owen Kelly	96	3	Ret (21)	Ret (19)	4	4	3	2	1	1	4	7	6	5	3	7	4	2	2	1150
5	(Australia) Leanne Ferrier	33	8	2	2	Ret (25)	Ret (21)	12	4	4	4	2	4	4	3	6	Ret (17)	9	Ret (16)	3	1018
6	(Australia) Dale Brede	90	4	10	15	7	2	7	8	6	5	5	5	5	DNS	8	8	3	10	4	976
7	(Australia) Terry Wyhoon	25	Ret (22)	8	5	9	6	13	7	5	6	8	6	12	12	10	5	13	7	Ret (17)	880
8	(Australia) Michael Simpson	93/88	2	16	3	2	5	4	Ret (21)	DNS	DNS	3	Ret (20)	DNS	14	9	3	6	6	8	840
9	(Australia) Garry Holt	20	6	13	Ret (20)	8	9	16	17	10	9	7	10	Ret (18)	4	13	15	12	9	Ret (18)	774
10	(Australia) Craig Harris	88	7	5	Ret (17)	5	3	2	Ret (22)	DNS	DNS				6	2	6	7	4	12	742
11	(Australia) Tim Rowse	81	13	18	Ret (18)	18	18	20	12	9	7	12	9	8	19	11	10	11	8	15	718
12	(Australia) Ross Halliday	61	15	19	13	13	11	10	14	13	11	16	16	13	16	15	11	15	11	11	702
13	(Australia) Bill Attard	37	18	15	12	16	14	17	15	12	10	19	17	15	17	14	12	16	14	14	654
14	(Australia) Kevin Mundy	89	16	17	16	15	17	8	Ret (23)	DNS	DNS	13	11	10	8	Ret (17)	14	17	13	16	594
15	(Australia) Alan Heath	500	19	Ret (22)	10	14	10	9	Ret (20)	DNS	DNS	11	8	7	11	DNS	DNS	14	12	13	566
16	(Australia) Eddie Abelnica	48							13	11	8	17	14	Ret (17)	7	12	9	10	15	7	516
17	(Australia) Ric Shaw	49	11	6	Ret (21)	Ret (24)	DNS	DNS	6	8	Ret (13)	10	13	11	10	DNS	DNS				468
18	(Australia) Phonsy Mullan	111	17	11	9	12	Ret (19)	11	9	Ret (17)	DNS										318
19	(Australia) Adam Wallis	59	12	9	DNS	19	DNS	DNS				DNS	DNS	DNS				8	3	9	310
20	(Australia) Daniel Miller	84	DNS	DNS	DNS	Ret (22)	13	14	10	Ret (15)	Ret (15)	DNS	DNS	DNS				Ret (18)	DNS	10	294
21	(Australia) Mal Rose	44	9	4	4	6	Ret (22)	DNS													260
22	(Australia) Wayne Wakefield	97													2	4	2				226
23	(Australia) Scott March	60	14	14	11	17	16	15													222
24	(Australia) Aaron McGill	145							18	Ret (16)	DNS	15	12	16	Ret (21)	DNS	DNS				200
25	(Australia) Luke Sieders	56	Ret (21)	14	12	Ret (21)	12	19													198
26	(Australia) Mick Donaher	59							3	7	Ret (14)				Ret (20)	DNS	DNS				190
27	(Australia) Peter Field	38				20	15	18				18	18	14							190
28	(Australia) Simon Emerzidis	63										14	15	9	18	Ret (18)	DNS				182
29	(Australia) Wayne Cooper	38							16	14	12										114
30	(Australia) Geoff Full	145	20	Ret (20)	6																110
31	(Australia) Kenny Habul	60													15	16	13				110
32	(Australia) Richard Mork	77	DNS	DNS	DNS	11	Ret (20)	Ret (21)													94
33	(Australia) Robert Smith	72							19	DNS	DNS	20	19	DNS							82
34	(Australia) Wesley May	99													Ret (22)	DNS	DNS				22
35	(Australia) Greg Crick	145				Ret (23)	DNS	DNS													20
Pos.	Driver	No.	WAK (New South Wales)			ORA (New South Wales)			WIN (Victoria (state))			PHI (Victoria (state))			LAK (Queensland)			MAL (South Australia)			Points

Colour	Result
Gold	Winner
Silver	Second place
Bronze	Third place
Green	Points classification
Blue	Non-points classification
Blue	Non-classified finish (NC)
Purple	Retired, not classified (Ret)
Red	Did not qualify (DNQ)
Red	Did not pre-qualify (DNPQ)
Black	Disqualified (DSQ)
White	Did not start (DNS)
White	Withdrew (WD)
White	Race cancelled (C)
Blank	Did not practice (DNP)
Blank	Did not arrive (DNA)
Blank	Excluded (EX)

== See also ==
- 2001 V8 Supercar season
