= Cameron McConville =

Australian racing driver

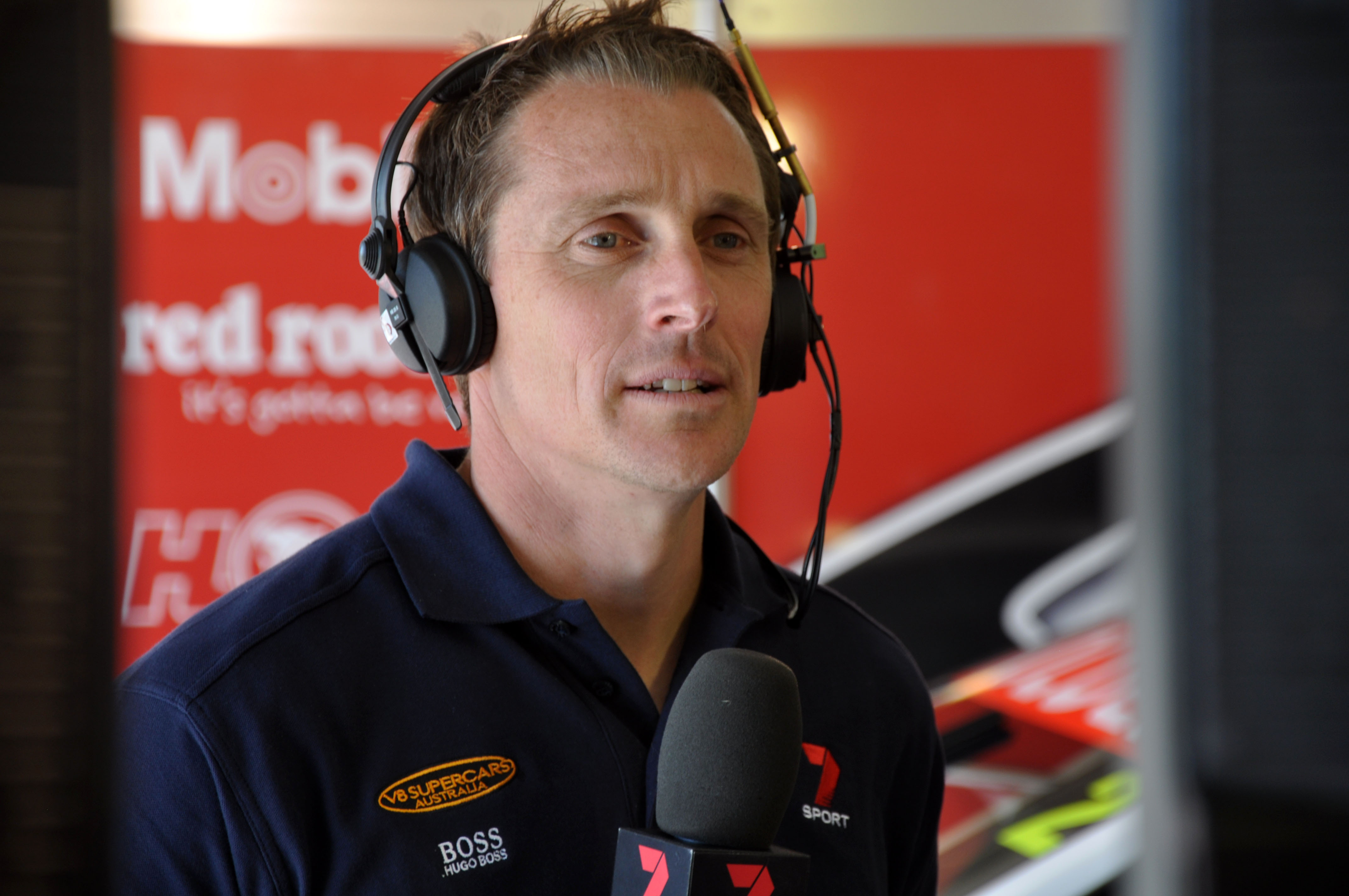
- McConville in 2010
- Nationality: (Australia) Australian
- Born: Cameron Eric McConville; 22 January 1974 (age 52) Melbourne, Victoria

Supercars career
- Debut season: 1999
- Teams: John Faulkner Racing; Rod Nash Racing; Lansvale Racing Team; Garry Rogers Motorsport; Paul Weel Racing; Brad Jones Racing; Holden Racing Team; Lucas Dumbrell Motorsport
- Starts: 330
- Wins: 2
- Poles: 0
- Best finish: 10th in 2005

Previous series
- 1990 1991–92 1996 1997–98 2011–12 2012-17 2015,17: Victorian Formula Ford; Australian Formula Ford; Australian GT Production; Australian Super Touring; V8 Utes; Australian GT C/ship; Carrera Cup Australia

Championship titles
- 1992 1996: Australian Formula Ford; Australian GT Production

Cameron Eric "Conkers" McConville (born 22 January 1974) is an Australian racing driver and motorsport celebrity. While retired from full-time competition, McConville still races occasionally and is an in-demand endurance event co-driver. McConville spent 14 years as a professional driver, ten of those in the largest Australian domestic category, Supercars Championship. McConville has also written for several magazines and presented several television programs and up until the end of the 2009 season was the colour commentator for Network Ten's Australian coverage of Formula One. McConville announced his retirement from full-time racing for the end of the 2009 season. He is also rumoured to be The Stig in Top Gear Australia.

McConville now works with Porsche Centre Melbourne as the Motorsport Commercial Manager.

== Early years ==
McConville began his motor racing career at the age of eight, racing go-karts in first local then national championships, culminating in several Victorian titles. At the age of fifteen, he became the youngest ever holder of a CAMS racing licence with a brief foray into Formula Vee racing before moving onto the highly competitive Formula Ford racing category in 1991. In 1992, he was chosen to be the 'works' Van Diemen driver and won the prestigious Motorcraft Formula Ford Driver to Europe Series, beating future champions such as Craig Lowndes and Steven Richards.

This victory (he was the youngest ever winner of the series) drew national attention and a testing role with Dick Johnson's Shell Ultra-hi Racing. McConville impressed Johnson and was included in the driver line up for the 1992 Tooheys 1000 in the team's second Ford Sierra RS500. McConville easily qualified the car, but in the wet conditions that marred the race it was decided to let the more experienced pair of Terry Shiel and Greg Crick handle the driving of the tricky, but powerful, turbocharged car.

McConville's solid performance in practice at Bathurst meant he was invited back to DJR for the 1993 Tooheys 1000, where he paired with Paul Radisich in Shell team's second Ford EB Falcon V8. Unfortunately, whilst in third position, and under pressure from Tomas Mezera in the Holden Racing Team VP Commodore, McConville miscued going over Skyline, got the car sideways and clouted the wall, causing what turned out to be mostly cosmetic damage to the Falcon. However, the damage the #18 Shell car was done and Radisich/McConville would ultimately finish in eighth position, ten laps behind the winning Larry Perkins/Gregg Hansford Commodore. McConville's crash at Mount Panorama proved to be costly to his rising career.

After several years of driving for lesser teams, McConville's persistence finally paid off when he teamed up with prominent Melbourne businessman Tom Warwick to drive a Porsche 993 RSCS in the Australian GTP championship during the 1996 season. He won the series in the last race of the year beating championship favourite Jim Richards. In 1997, he was chosen to replace Greg Murphy as the Audi Australia 'works' driver (largely due to his success the previous year) where he finished third in the Australian Super Touring Championship. In 1998, he was narrowly beaten to the championship by team owner Brad Jones in somewhat controversial circumstances.

== Supercars career ==
An impressive part-time drive in the 1999 V8 Supercar championship saw the Holden Racing Team offer McConville an endurance co-drive, pairing up with the then championship leader Craig Lowndes. Together they finished in second place at the Bathurst 1000 race. This performance earned him a full-time contract with the newly expanded Rod Nash Racing for 2000. In 2001 he moved to the Sydney-based Lansvale racing team where he continued to impress in under-funded, less-developed machinery. He remained with the team until he was offered a contract with the Garry Rogers Motorsport outfit in 2004 after he was the outright winner of the Bathurst 24 hour race in 2002 in a Holden Monaro driving for the same team. The move to the Garry Rogers team proved fruitful for McConville when he took his first championship race win at Winton Raceway in 2004. In 2005 he took on team leader status at GRM with the departure of Garth Tander to the HSV dealer team. The following year, McConville was lured to Kees and Paul Weel's Supercheap Auto Racing outfit to pair with Greg Murphy after the retirement of Paul Weel in 2005.

In 2007, McConville began a new motorsport reporting role with Channel Ten, including co-hosting the Formula One coverage.

In 2008, McConville joined up with his former boss Brad Jones to drive the number 14 Commodore after the team made the switch from Ford to Holden with the support of Walkinshaw Performance in the pursuit of better results. WOW Sight and Sound soon signed on as McConville's major sponsor for the 2008 championship. McConville immediately highlighted the new relationship with an excellent third at the Adelaide 500. After two mixed seasons, McConville announced his decision to step down from full-time racing at the end of the season, the announcement came soon after a nasty crash at the Phillip Island 500K. During the off-season, it was also announced that McConville would not be returning to his on-screen role with Channel 10 and McConville set up a business franchise in tyre retailing. A change in V8 Supercar endurance race regulations made McConville hot property as a co-driver in 2010 and he was quickly announced as a co-driver for the Holden Racing Team.

McConville stepped back into a race car at the 2010 Bathurst 12 Hour and co-drove a HSV R8 Tourer to third place. Subsequently, McConville picked up a drive in the 2010 Fujitsu V8 Supercar Series driving the Eggleston Motorsport Commodore which also enjoyed support from Holden Racing Team's parent organisation Walkinshaw Performance eager to get McConville additional racing prior to the 2010 endurance races. In the lead up to the 2010 Sucrogen Townsville 400, Lucas Dumbrell Motorsport announced that McConville would be replacing Daniel Gaunt in the team in the short term.

McConville was a last minute entrant for Team BOC at the Falken Tasmania Challenge of the 2011 V8 Supercars Championship. He replaced Jason Bright in Race 24, who withdrew after qualifying due to a rib injury. McConville started at the rear of the field and finished 19th.

== Career results ==
Season	Series	Position	Car	Entrant / team
1991	Motorcraft Formula Ford Driver to Europe Series	8th	Van Diemen RF91 Ford	Anderson Consulting / Ken McConville
1992	Motorcraft Formula Ford Driver to Europe Series	**1st**	Van Diemen RF92 Ford	Anderson Consulting
1996	Australian GT Production Car Championship	**1st**	Porsche 993 RSCS	Warwick Fabrics
1997	Australian Super Touring Championship	**3rd**	Audi A4 Quattro	Brad Jones Racing
1998	Australian Super Touring Championship	**2nd**	Audi A4 Quattro	Brad Jones Racing
1999	Shell Championship Series	17th	Holden VS Commodore; Holden VT Commodore	John Faulkner Racing; Holden Racing Team
2000	Shell Championship Series	27th	Holden VT Commodore	Rod Nash Racing
2001	Shell Championship Series	21st	Holden VX Commodore	Lansvale Racing Team
2002	V8 Supercar Championship Series	28th	Holden VX Commodore	Lansvale Racing Team
2003	V8 Supercar Championship Series	18th	Holden VX Commodore	Lansvale Racing Team
2004	V8 Supercar Championship Series	13th	Holden VY Commodore	Garry Rogers Motorsport
2005	V8 Supercar Championship Series	10th	Holden VZ Commodore	Garry Rogers Motorsport
2006	V8 Supercar Championship Series	13th	Holden VZ Commodore	Paul Weel Racing
2007	V8 Supercar Championship Series	34th	Holden VE Commodore	Paul Weel Racing
2008	V8 Supercar Championship Series	22nd	Holden VE Commodore	Brad Jones Racing
2009	V8 Supercar Championship Series	20th	Holden VE Commodore	Brad Jones Racing
2010	Fujitsu V8 Supercar Series	22nd	Holden VE Commodore	Eggleston Motorsport
2010	V8 Supercar Championship Series	29th	Holden VE Commodore	Lucas Dumbrell Motorsport; Holden Racing Team
2011	International V8 Supercars Championship	34th	Holden VE Commodore	Holden Racing Team; Brad Jones Racing
2011	Fujitsu V8 Supercar Series	24th	Holden VE Commodore	Eggleston Motorsport
2011	Australian V8 Ute Racing Series	5th	Holden VE Ute SS	Walkinshaw Racing
2012	International V8 Supercars Championship	34th	Holden VE Commodore	Holden Racing Team
2012	Australian V8 Ute Racing Series	5th	Holden VE Ute SS	Walkinshaw Racing
2014	Australian GT Championship	34th	Ferrari 458 Italia GT3	Maranello Motorsport
2014	Kumho Tyres V8 Touring Car Series	9th	Holden VZ Commodore	Eggleston Motorsport
2015	Australian GT Championship	41st	Ferrari 458 Italia	Maranello Motorsport
2015	Australian Carrera Cup Championship	14th	Porsche 911 GT3 Cup Type 991	OPS Gateway
2016	International V8 Supercars Championship	33rd	Holden VF Commodore	Lucas Dumbrell Motorsport
2017	Virgin Australia Supercars Championship	54th	Holden VF Commodore	Lucas Dumbrell Motorsport
2017	Australian Carrera Cup Championship	7th	Porsche 911 GT3 Cup Type 991	Zagame Autosport

=== Supercars Championship results ===
(Races in bold indicate pole position) (Races in italics indicate fastest lap)

Supercars results
Year	Team	Car	1	2	3	4	5	6	7	8	9	10	11	12	13	14	15	16	17	18	19	20	21	22	23	24	25	26	27	28	29	30	31	32	33	34	35	36	37	38	Position	Points
1999	John Faulkner Racing	Holden Commodore (VS)	EAS; R1	EAS; R2	EAS; R3	ADE; R4	BAR; R5	BAR; R6	BAR; R7	PHI; R8	PHI; R9	PHI; R10	HDV; R11	HDV; R12	HDV; R13	SAN; R14; 22	SAN; R15; 13	SAN; R16; 13	QLD; R17; 30	QLD; R18; Ret	QLD; R19; DNS	CAL; R20; 11	CAL; R21; 7	CAL; R22; 6	SYM; R23	SYM; R24	SYM; R25	WIN; R26	WIN; R27	WIN; R28	ORA; R29	ORA; R30	ORA; R31	QLD; R32	BAT; R33						17th	770
1999	Holden Racing Team	Holden Commodore (VT)	EAS; R1	EAS; R2	EAS; R3	ADE; R4	BAR; R5	BAR; R6	BAR; R7	PHI; R8	PHI; R9	PHI; R10	HDV; R11	HDV; R12	HDV; R13	SAN; R14	SAN; R15	SAN; R16	QLD; R17	QLD; R18	QLD; R19	CAL; R20	CAL; R21	CAL; R22	SYM; R23; 6	SYM; R24; 7	SYM; R25; DNS	WIN; R26	WIN; R27	WIN; R28	ORA; R29	ORA; R30	ORA; R31	QLD; R32; 3	BAT; R33; 2						17th	770
2000	Rod Nash Racing	Holden Commodore (VT)	PHI; R1; 18	PHI; R2; Ret	BAR; R3; 22	BAR; R4; Ret	BAR; R5; 20	ADE; R6; 14	ADE; R7; Ret	EAS; R8; 17	EAS; R9; 17	EAS; R10; 14	HDV; R11; Ret	HDV; R12; Ret	HDV; R13; Wth	CAN; R14; Ret	CAN; R15; Ret	CAN; R16; 20	QLD; R17; 28	QLD; R18; 19	QLD; R19; 16	WIN; R20; 23	WIN; R21; Ret	WIN; R22; 13	ORA; R23; 22	ORA; R24; 21	ORA; R25; 20	CAL; R26; 18	CAL; R27; 17	CAL; R28; 16	QLD; R29; 15	SAN; R30; 20	SAN; R31; 16	SAN; R32; 20	BAT; R33; Ret						27th	201
2001	Lansvale Racing Team	Holden Commodore (VX)	PHI; R1; 28	PHI; R2; 20	ADE; R3; Ret	ADE; R4; Ret	EAS; R5; 25	EAS; R6; 16	HDV; R7; 17	HDV; R8; 16	HDV; R9; 18	CAN; R10; 19	CAN; R11; Ret	CAN; R12; 13	BAR; R13; 12	BAR; R14; 10	BAR; R15; 10	CAL; R16; 11	CAL; R17; 10	CAL; R18; 11	ORA; R19; 10	ORA; R20; 6	QLD; R21; 19	WIN; R22; Ret	WIN; R23; Ret	BAT; R24; 10	PUK; R25; 23	PUK; R26; 26	PUK; R27; Ret	SAN; R28; Ret	SAN; R29; 25	SAN; R30; 22									21st	1275
2002	Lansvale Racing Team	Holden Commodore (VX)	ADE; R1; Ret	ADE; R2; Ret	PHI; R3; 11	PHI; R4; 4	EAS; R5; Ret	EAS; R6; 14	EAS; R7; 10	HDV; R8; 23	HDV; R9; 19	HDV; R10; 29	CAN; R11; Ret	CAN; R12; 21	CAN; R13; 25	BAR; R14; 23	BAR; R15; 5	BAR; R16; 9	ORA; R17; Ret	ORA; R18; 14	WIN; R19; 24	WIN; R20; 26	QLD; R21; Ret	BAT; R22; 15	SUR; R23; 12	SUR; R24; 19	PUK; R25; Ret	PUK; R26; 18	PUK; R27; Ret	SAN; R28; 31	SAN; R29; Ret										28th	375
2003	Lansvale Racing Team	Holden Commodore (VX)	ADE; R1; 8	ADE; R1; Ret	PHI; R3; Ret	EAS; R4; 12	WIN; R5; 17	BAR; R6; 21	BAR; R7; 8	BAR; R8; 9	HDV; R9; 23	HDV; R10; 14	HDV; R11; 14	QLD; R12; 15	ORA; R13; 9	SAN; R14; Ret	BAT; R15; 20	SUR; R16; 19	SUR; R17; 15	PUK; R18; Ret	PUK; R19; 18	PUK; R20; 20	EAS; R21; 10	EAS; R22; 8																	18th	1191
2004	Garry Rogers Motorsport	Holden Commodore (VY)	ADE; R1; 17	ADE; R2; Ret	EAS; R3; 25	PUK; R4; 19	PUK; R5; 18	PUK; R6; 26	HDV; R7; 23	HDV; R8; 18	HDV; R9; 27	BAR; R10; 6	BAR; R11; Ret	BAR; R12; 18	QLD; R13; 10	WIN; R14; 1	ORA; R15; 8	ORA; R16; 22	SAN; R17; 4	BAT; R18; Ret	SUR; R19; 10	SUR; R20; 6	SYM; R21; 15	SYM; R22; 7	SYM; R23; 7	EAS; R24; 12	EAS; R25; 10	EAS; R26; 6													13th	1292
2005	Garry Rogers Motorsport	Holden Commodore (VZ)	ADE; R1; 17	ADE; R2; 6	PUK; R3; 21	PUK; R4; 18	PUK; R5; Ret	BAR; R6; 8	BAR; R7; 9	BAR; R8; 19	EAS; R9; 15	EAS; R10; 13	SHA; R11; 16	SHA; R12; 9	SHA; R13; 9	HDV; R14; 18	HDV; R15; 31	HDV; R16; 22	QLD; R17; 17	ORA; R18; 8	ORA; R19; 8	SAN; R20; 10	BAT; R21; 4	SUR; R22; 5	SUR; R23; 6	SUR; R24; 5	SYM; R25; 14	SYM; R26; 15	SYM; R27; 17	PHI; R28; 18	PHI; R29; 14	PHI; R30; 21									10th	1501
2006	Paul Weel Racing	Holden Commodore (VZ)	ADE; R1; 4	ADE; R2; Ret	PUK; R3; 13	PUK; R4; 4	PUK; R5; 23	BAR; R6; 13	BAR; R7; 25	BAR; R8; 11	WIN; R9; 19	WIN; R10; 22	WIN; R11; 15	HDV; R12; 15	HDV; R13; 16	HDV; R14; 7	QLD; R15; 12	QLD; R16; 10	QLD; R17; Ret	ORA; R18; 18	ORA; R19; 19	ORA; R20; 7	SAN; R21; 29	BAT; R22; Ret	SUR; R23; 13	SUR; R24; 11	SUR; R25; 7	SYM; R26; 11	SYM; R27; 21	SYM; R28; 9	BHR; R29; 14	BHR; R30; 9	BHR; R31; 9	PHI; R32; 15	PHI; R33; 10	PHI; R34; 6					13th	2099
2007	Paul Weel Racing	Holden Commodore (VE)	ADE; R1; 21	ADE; R2; 15	BAR; R3; 19	BAR; R4; 24	BAR; R5; 16	PUK; R6; 18	PUK; R7; 14	PUK; R8; 15	WIN; R9; 12	WIN; R10; 21	WIN; R11; 22	EAS; R12; 18	EAS; R13; 16	EAS; R14; 17	HDV; R15; 20	HDV; R16; 19	HDV; R17; 20	QLD; R18; Ret	QLD; R19; 18	QLD; R20; 14	ORA; R21; 17	ORA; R22; 22	ORA; R23; Ret	SAN; R24; Ret	BAT; R25; Ret	SUR; R26; 18	SUR; R27; 10	SUR; R28; 9	BHR; R29; Ret	BHR; R30; 20	BHR; R31; 27	SYM; R32; 19	SYM; R33; Ret	SYM; R34; DNS	PHI; R35; 15	PHI; R36; Ret	PHI; R37; 18		34th	35
2008	Brad Jones Racing	Holden Commodore (VE)	ADE; R1; Ret	ADE; R2; 3	EAS; R3; 15	EAS; R4; 18	EAS; R5; 12	HAM; R6; 6	HAM; R7; 5	HAM; R8; 20	BAR; R9; 10	BAR; R10; 10	BAR; R11; Ret	SAN; R12; 14	SAN; R13; 10	SAN; R14; 13	HDV; R15; Ret	HDV; R16; 16	HDV; R17; 12	QLD; R18; 13	QLD; R19; 9	QLD; R20; 14	WIN; R21; 23	WIN; R22; 23	WIN; R23; 19	PHI; Q 6	PHI; R24; Ret	BAT; R25; Ret	SUR; R26; 12	SUR; R27; 22	SUR; R28; Ret	BHR; R29; 13	BHR; R30; 25	BHR; R31; 21	SYM; R32; 14	SYM; R33; 15	SYM; R34; Ret	ORA; R35; 11	ORA; R36; 19	ORA; R37; 22	22nd	1370
2009	Brad Jones Racing	Holden Commodore (VE)	ADE; R1; 9	ADE; R2; 21	HAM; R3; 16	HAM; R4; 19	WIN; R5; 5	WIN; R6; 23	SYM; R7; 13	SYM; R8; 13	HDV; R9; 9	HDV; R10; 23	TOW; R11; 9	TOW; R12; 11	SAN; R13; 22	SAN; R14; 4	QLD; R15; Ret	QLD; R16; 11	PHI; Q 16	PHI; R17; Ret	BAT; R18; 2	SUR; R19; 18	SUR; R20; 19	SUR; R21; Ret	SUR; R22; DNS	PHI; R23; 24	PHI; R24; 25	BAR; R25; 25	BAR; R26; 9	SYD; R27; Ret	SYD; R28; Ret										20th	1565
2010	Lucas Dumbrell Motorsport	Holden Commodore (VE)	YMC; R1	YMC; R2	BHR; R3	BHR; R4	ADE; R5	ADE; R6	HAM; R7	HAM; R8	QLD; R9	QLD; R10	WIN; R11	WIN; R12	HDV; R13	HDV; R14	TOW; R15; 24	TOW; R16; 16	PHI; R17	BAT; R18	SUR; R19	SUR; R20	SYM; R21	SYM; R22	SAN; R23	SAN; R24	SYD; R25	SYD; R26													29th	669
2010	Holden Racing Team	Holden Commodore (VE)	YMC; R1	YMC; R2	BHR; R3	BHR; R4	ADE; R5	ADE; R6	HAM; R7	HAM; R8	QLD; R9	QLD; R10	WIN; R11	WIN; R12	HDV; R13	HDV; R14	TOW; R15	TOW; R16	PHI; R17; 9	BAT; R18; 3	SUR; R19; 1	SUR; R20; Ret	SYM; R21	SYM; R22	SAN; R23	SAN; R24	SYD; R25	SYD; R26													29th	669
2011	Holden Racing Team	Holden Commodore (VE)	YMC; R1	YMC; R2	ADE; R3	ADE; R4	HAM; R5	HAM; R6	BAR; R7	BAR; R8	BAR; R9	WIN; R10	WIN; R11	HID; R12	HID; R13	TOW; R14	TOW; R15	QLD; R16	QLD; R17	QLD; R18	PHI; R19; 9	BAT; R20; 7	SUR; R21	SUR; R22	SYM; R23	SYM; R24	SAN; R25	SAN; R26	SYD; R27	SYD; R28											34th	406
2011	Brad Jones Racing	Holden Commodore (VE)	YMC; R1	YMC; R2	ADE; R3	ADE; R4	HAM; R5	HAM; R6	BAR; R7	BAR; R8	BAR; R9	WIN; R10	WIN; R11	HID; R12	HID; R13	TOW; R14	TOW; R15	QLD; R16	QLD; R17	QLD; R18	PHI; R19	BAT; R20	SUR; R21	SUR; R22	SYM; R23; DNS	SYM; R24; 19	SAN; R25	SAN; R26	SYD; R27	SYD; R28											34th	406
2012	Holden Racing Team	Holden Commodore (VE)	ADE; R1	ADE; R2	SYM; R3	SYM; R4	HAM; R5	HAM; R6	BAR; R7	BAR; R8	BAR; R9	PHI; R10	PHI; R11	HID; R12	HID; R13	TOW; R14	TOW; R15	QLD; R16	QLD; R17	SMP; R18	SMP; R19	SAN; Q 11	SAN; R20; 9	BAT; R21; 4	SUR; R22	SUR; R23	YMC; R24	YMC; R25	YMC; R26	WIN; R27	WIN; R28	SYD; R29									34th	406
2016	Lucas Dumbrell Motorsport	Holden Commodore (VF)	ADE; R1	ADE; R2	ADE; R3	SYM; R4	SYM; R5	PHI; R6	PHI; R7	BAR; R8	BAR; R9	WIN; R10	WIN; R11	HID; R12	HID; R13	TOW; R14	TOW; R15	QLD; R16	QLD; R17	SMP; R18	SMP; R19	SAN; QR; 13	SAN; R20; 9	BAT; R21; 3	SUR; R22; Ret	SUR; R23; 16	PUK; R24	PUK; R25	PUK; R26	PUK; R27	SYD; R28	SYD; R29									33rd	483
2017	Lucas Dumbrell Motorsport	Holden Commodore (VF)	ADE; R1	ADE; R2	SYM; R3	SYM; R4	PHI; R5	PHI; R6	BAR; R7	BAR; R8	WIN; R9	WIN; R10	HID; R11; 17	HID; R12; 26	TOW; R13	TOW; R14	QLD; R15	QLD; R16	SMP; R17	SMP; R18	SAN; QR	SAN; R19	BAT; R20	SUR; R21	SUR; R22	PUK; R23	PUK; R24	NEW; R25	NEW; R26												54th	81

== Bathurst 1000 results ==
Year	Car#	Team	Car	Co-driver	Position	Laps
1992	18	Dick Johnson Racing	Ford Sierra RS500	(Australia) Terry Shiel (Australia) Greg Crick	11th	134
1993	18	Dick Johnson Racing	Ford EB Falcon	(New Zealand) Paul Radisich	8th	151
1994	39	Challenge Motorsport	Holden VP Commodore	(Australia) Chris Smerdon	13th	151
1996	10	Larkham Motor Sport	Ford EF Falcon	(Australia) Mark Larkham	DNF	3
1997*	11	Brad Jones Racing	Audi A4 Quattro	(France) Jean-François Hemroulle	3rd	161
1998*	1	Brad Jones Racing	Audi A4 Quattro	(Australia) Brad Jones	3rd	161
1998	18	Dick Johnson Racing	Ford EL Falcon	(Australia) John Bowe	DNF	80
1999	1	Holden Racing Team	Holden VT Commodore	(Australia) Craig Lowndes	2nd	161
2000	54	Rod Nash Racing	Holden VT Commodore	(Australia) Geoff Brabham	DNF	105
2001	3	Lansvale Racing Team	Holden VX Commodore	(Australia) Rick Bates	10th	160
2002	3	Lansvale Racing Team	Holden VX Commodore	(Australia) Warren Luff	15th	159
2003	3	Lansvale Racing Team	Holden VX Commodore	(Australia) Tim Leahey	20th	144
2004	34	Garry Rogers Motorsport	Holden VY Commodore	(Australia) Garth Tander	DNF	133
2005	34	Garry Rogers Motorsport	Holden VZ Commodore	(Australia) Andrew Jones	4th	161
2006	51	Paul Weel Racing	Holden VZ Commodore	(New Zealand) Greg Murphy	DNF	104
2007	50	Paul Weel Racing	Holden VE Commodore	(Australia) David Reynolds	DNS	0
2008	12	Brad Jones Racing	Holden VE Commodore	(Australia) Andrew Jones	DNF	40
2009	8	Brad Jones Racing	Holden VE Commodore	(New Zealand) Jason Richards	2nd	161
2010	2	Holden Racing Team	Holden VE Commodore	(Australia) Garth Tander	3rd	161
2011	1	Holden Racing Team	Holden VE Commodore	(Australia) James Courtney	7th	161
2012	22	Holden Racing Team	Holden VE Commodore	(Australia) James Courtney	4th	161
2016	222	Lucas Dumbrell Motorsport	Holden VF Commodore	(Australia) Nick Percat	3rd	161

* Super Touring race

=== Complete Bathurst 24 Hour results ===
Year	Team	Co-drivers	Car	Class	Laps	Overall position	Class position
2002	(Australia) Garry Rogers Motorsport	(Australia) Garth Tander (New Zealand) Steven Richards (Australia) Nathan Pretty	Holden Monaro 427C	1	532	1st	1st
2003	(Australia) Garry Rogers Motorsport	(Australia) Nathan Pretty (Australia) Garth Tander (New Zealand) Steven Richards	Holden Monaro 427C	A	527	2nd	2nd
