= 1999 V8 Supercars Oran Park round =

(New South Wales) 1999 Oran Park V8 Supercar round
Event Information
- Round 11 of 13 in the 1999 Shell Championship Series
- Date: 3-5 September 1999
- Location: Narellan, New South Wales
- Venue: Oran Park Raceway
- Weather: Fine

Results
Race 1
Distance	19 laps	50 km
Pole position	Mark Skaife; Holden Racing Team	1:07.4906
Winner	Mark Skaife; Holden Racing Team	23:51.9536
Race 2
Distance	20 laps	52 km
Winner	Mark Skaife; Holden Racing Team	20:10.9749
Race 3
Distance	22 laps	57 km
Winner	Mark Skaife; Holden Racing Team	34:27.5026
Round Results
First	Mark Skaife; Holden Racing Team	150 pts
Second	Craig Lowndes; Holden Racing Team	138 pts
Third	Jason Bright; Stone Brothers Racing	132 pts

The 1999 Oran Park V8 Supercar round was the eleventh round of the 1999 Shell Championship Series. It was held on the weekend of 3 to 5 September at Oran Park Raceway in Sydney, New South Wales.

== Race results ==
=== Qualifying ===
==== Top 50% ====
Pos	No	Name	Team	Vehicle	Time
1	2	(Australia) Mark Skaife	Holden Racing Team	Holden Commodore (VT)	1:07.4906
2	1	(Australia) Craig Lowndes	Holden Racing Team	Holden Commodore (VT)	1:07.5025
3	31	(Australia) Steven Ellery	Steven Ellery Racing	Ford Falcon (EL)	1:07.8755
4	4	(Australia) Jason Bright	Stone Brothers Racing	Ford Falcon (AU)	1:07.9499
5	40	(Australia) Cameron McLean	Greenfield Mowers Racing	Ford Falcon (EL)	1:08.0294
6	8	(Australia) Russell Ingall	Perkins Engineering	Holden Commodore (VT)	1:08.0322
7	34	(Australia) Garth Tander	Garry Rogers Motorsport	Holden Commodore (VT)	1:08.1335
8	25	(Australia) Tony Longhurst	Longhurst Racing	Ford Falcon (AU)	1:08.1344
9	5	(Australia) Glenn Seton	Glenn Seton Racing	Ford Falcon (AU)	1:08.1618
10	7	(New Zealand) Steven Richards	Gibson Motorsport	Holden Commodore (VT)	1:08.2326
11	12	(New Zealand) Greg Murphy	Gibson Motorsport	Holden Commodore (VT)	1:08.2402
12	6	(Australia) Neil Crompton	Glenn Seton Racing	Ford Falcon (AU)	1:08.3877
13	10	(Australia) Mark Larkham	Larkham Motorsport	Ford Falcon (AU)	1:08.4195
14	18	(New Zealand) Paul Radisich	Dick Johnson Racing	Ford Falcon (AU)	1:08.4532
15	46	(New Zealand) John Faulkner	John Faulkner Racing	Holden Commodore (VT)	1:08.5716
16	17	(Australia) Dick Johnson	Dick Johnson Racing	Ford Falcon (AU)	1:08.6222
17	600	(Australia) John Bowe	PAE Motorsport	Ford Falcon (AU)	1:08.6898
18	35	(Australia) Jason Bargwanna	Garry Rogers Motorsport	Holden Commodore (VT)	1:08.8074
19	11	(Australia) Larry Perkins	Perkins Engineering	Holden Commodore (VT)	1:08.8850
20	3	(Australia) Trevor Ashby	Lansvale Racing Team	Holden Commodore (VS)	1:09.3689

==== Bottom 50% ====
Pos	No	Name	Team	Vehicle	Time
1	24	(Australia) Paul Romano	Romano Racing	Holden Commodore (VS)	1:09.1803
2	28	(Australia) Rodney Forbes	Bob Forbes Racing	Holden Commodore (VS)	1:09.2580
3	50	(Australia) Michael Donaher	Clive Wiseman Racing	Holden Commodore (VS)	1:09.4106
4	26	(Australia) Peter Doulman	M3 Motorsport	Holden Commodore (VS)	1:09.6039
5	27	(Australia) Darren Pate	Terry Finnigan Racing Team	Holden Commodore (VS)	1:09.6060
6	39	(Australia) Chris Smerdon	Challenge Motorsport	Holden Commodore (VS)	1:09.7790
7	16	(Australia) Dugal McDougall	McDougall Motorsport	Holden Commodore (VT)	1:09.8676
8	55	(Australia) Rod Nash	Rod Nash Racing	Holden Commodore (VS)	1:09.9019
9	30	(Australia) Craig Harris	Harris Racing	Ford Falcon (EL)	1:09.9540
10	43	(Australia) Paul Weel	Paul Weel Racing	Ford Falcon (AU)	1:09.9990
11	54	(Australia) Simon Emerzidis	Simon Emerzidis Racing	Ford Falcon (EL)	1:10.0597
12	73	(Australia) David Parsons	Gibson Motorsport	Holden Commodore (VS)	1:10.0733
13	70	(Australia) John Briggs	Briggs Motorsport	Ford Falcon (AU)	1:10.2480
14	79	(Australia) Mike Conway	Cadillac Productions	Ford Falcon (EL)	1:10.3614
15	49	(Australia) Layton Crambrook	Crambrook Racing	Holden Commodore (VS)	1:10.3758
16	80	(Australia) Bob Thorn	Briggs Motorsport	Ford Falcon (AU)	1:10.9449
17	98	(Australia) Dean Canto	Challenge Recruitment	Holden Commodore (VS)	1:11.0812
18	87	(Australia) Damien White	Rod Salmon Racing	Holden Commodore (VS)	1:11.2565
19	37	(Australia) Bill Attard	Scotty Taylor Racing	Holden Commodore (VS)	1:12.6632
20	52	(Australia) Barry Morcom	Barry Morcom Racing	Holden Commodore (VS)	1:12.8295
21	77	(Australia) Richard Mork	V8 Racing	Holden Commodore (VS)	1:13.1101

=== Privateers Race ===
Pos.	No.	Name	Team	Vehicle	Laps	Time	Grid
1	40	(Australia) Cameron McLean	Greenfield Mowers Racing	Ford Falcon (EL)	13	16min 02.0474sec	1
2	28	(Australia) Rodney Forbes	Bob Forbes Racing	Holden Commodore (VS)	13	+ 6.057	3
3	3	(Australia) Trevor Ashby	Lansvale Racing Team	Holden Commodore (VS)	13	+ 6.300	2
4	50	(Australia) Michael Donaher	Clive Wiseman Racing	Holden Commodore (VS)	13	+ 6.858	4
5	54	(Australia) Simon Emerzidis	Simon Emerzidis Racing	Ford Falcon (EL)	13	+ 16.050 s	9
6	27	(Australia) Darren Pate	Terry Finnigan Racing Team	Holden Commodore (VS)	13	+ 16.354	6
7	49	(Australia) Layton Crambrook	Crambrook Racing	Holden Commodore (VS)	13	+ 16.740	12
8	26	(Australia) Peter Doulman	M3 Motorsport	Holden Commodore (VS)	13	+ 20.341	5
9	87	(Australia) Damien White	Rod Salmon Racing	Holden Commodore (VS)	13	+ 20.715	15
10	30	(Australia) Craig Harris	Harris Racing	Ford Falcon (EL)	13	+ 29.240	8
11	73	(Australia) David Parsons	Gibson Motorsport	Holden Commodore (VS)	13	+ 36.209	10
12	52	(Australia) Barry Morcom	Barry Morcom Racing	Holden Commodore (VS)	13	+ 38.893	17
13	79	(Australia) Mike Conway	Cadillac Productions	Ford Falcon (EL)	13	+ 41.082	11
14	37	(Australia) Bill Attard	Scotty Taylor Racing	Holden Commodore (VS)	13	+ 43.693	16
15	98	(Australia) Dean Canto	Owen Parkinson Racing	Holden Commodore (VS)	12	+ 1 lap	14
Ret	39	(Australia) Chris Smerdon	Challenge Motorsport	Holden Commodore (VS)	7	Retired	7
Ret	80	(Australia) Bob Thorn	Briggs Motorsport	Ford Falcon (AU)	1	Retired	13
Fastest Lap: Cameron McLean (Greenfield Mowers Racing) - 1:09.1875 on lap 8
