= Paul Dumbrell =

Australian racing driver

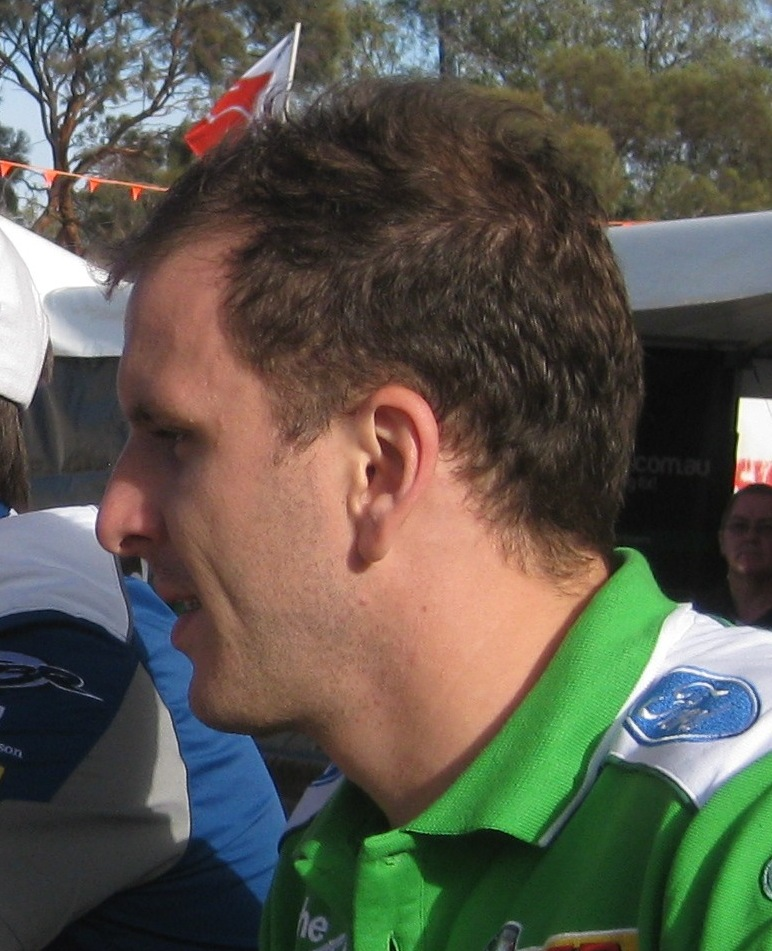
- Dumbrell at the 2010 Clipsal 500 Adelaide
- Nationality: Australian
- Born: Paul Lakeland Dumbrell; 1 September 1982 (age 44) Melbourne, Victoria, Australia
- Categorisation: FIA Gold

Supercars Championship career
- Championships: 0
- Races: 299
- Wins: 7
- Podiums: 14
- Pole positions: 5

Paul Lakeland Dumbrell (born 1 September 1982) is an Australian business executive and retired racing driver.

== Racing history ==
=== Junior career ===
Son of former racing driver Garry Dumbrell, Dumbrell started racing in karts in 1996 and by the end of 1997 Dumbrell was looking to further his racing. He was educated at Xavier College in Kew, Melbourne and resides in Melbourne, Australia. He competed in the Australian Sprint Kart National Championships in April 1998. He then attended a driving course with Kevin Flynn at Sandown Raceway where he briefly drove the ex Craig Lowndes Van Diemen RF85. He then attended the Jim Russell International School of Racing in England. During the course, Dumbrell drove a Formula Vauxhall. At the age of 15, he was the youngest in the class and even though he was the fastest graduate from the school, he was ineligible for the final race, for which drivers had to be 16.

On returning to Australia, Dumbrell looked to do a couple of races in Formula Ford but broke his hip when hit by a car while training on his mountain bike. This injury prevented him from racing for 8 weeks and put an end to any chance of running a Formula Ford. At the end of 1998 he entered his first production car race, the GT Production three-hour at Bathurst in a Subaru WRX, but his race ended with mechanical failure. For the 1999 season he drove a Formula Holden in the Australian Drivers' Championship, and had his first race in the V8 Supercar Championship Series in August 1999 at Symmons Plains, in Tasmania.

After a full year's experience in a Formula Holden, Dumbrell had the chance to test a Formula 3000 car with Mark Webber for Paul Stoddart's Arrows Team, driving 20 laps in the car at Donington Park. When he returned to Australia he took up a permanent driving spot in the Konica V8 Supercar Development Series. 2001 saw Dumbrell consistently at the front, and he won the Series in 2002.

Dumbrell made his first Bathurst 1000 start at 17 years and 74 days, and was the youngest ever driver to drive a V8 Supercar. He raced a Wynns/Falkuner Racing No. 96 Holden VS Commodore with Matthew White, qualifying the car in 33rd position but retiring on lap 15 after he hit the wall at McPhillamy Park.

2002 saw Dumbrell picked up by Castrol Perkins Racing's Team Owner Larry Perkins as his co-driver in the Castrol Perkins Holden VX Commodore at both the Queensland 500 and Bathurst 1000. At Bathurst that year, Perkins and Dumbrell finished a surprise fifth position overall.

=== Full-time V8 Supercars career ===
==== Castrol Perkins Motorsport ====
Dumbrell's fifth placing at Bathurst in 2002 helped him secure a two-year deal with Castrol Perkins Motorsport for 2003 and 2004. In 2005, Dumbrell achieved his best-ever round V8 Supercar Championship Series result at Symmons Plains, Tasmania - the venue of his first ever V8 Supercar start - ending the round in fifth place. 2005 also saw his best ever Championship placing, finishing in 20th, after placing 29th in 2003 and 24th in 2004.

2006 saw Dumbrell driving the number 11 Holden VZ Commodore to 12th place, his best ever V8 Supercar Championship Series placing. He finished fifth at Bathurst and was within reach of a podium finish until slowed by mechanical problems.

==== Supercheap Auto Racing ====
For the 2007 season, Dumbrell moved from Jack Daniels Racing to Supercheap Auto Racing, replacing Greg Murphy. He had a poor season due to the unreliability of the cars, and the only highlight was a sixth placing with Paul Weel at the Sandown 500.

==== HSV Dealer Team ====
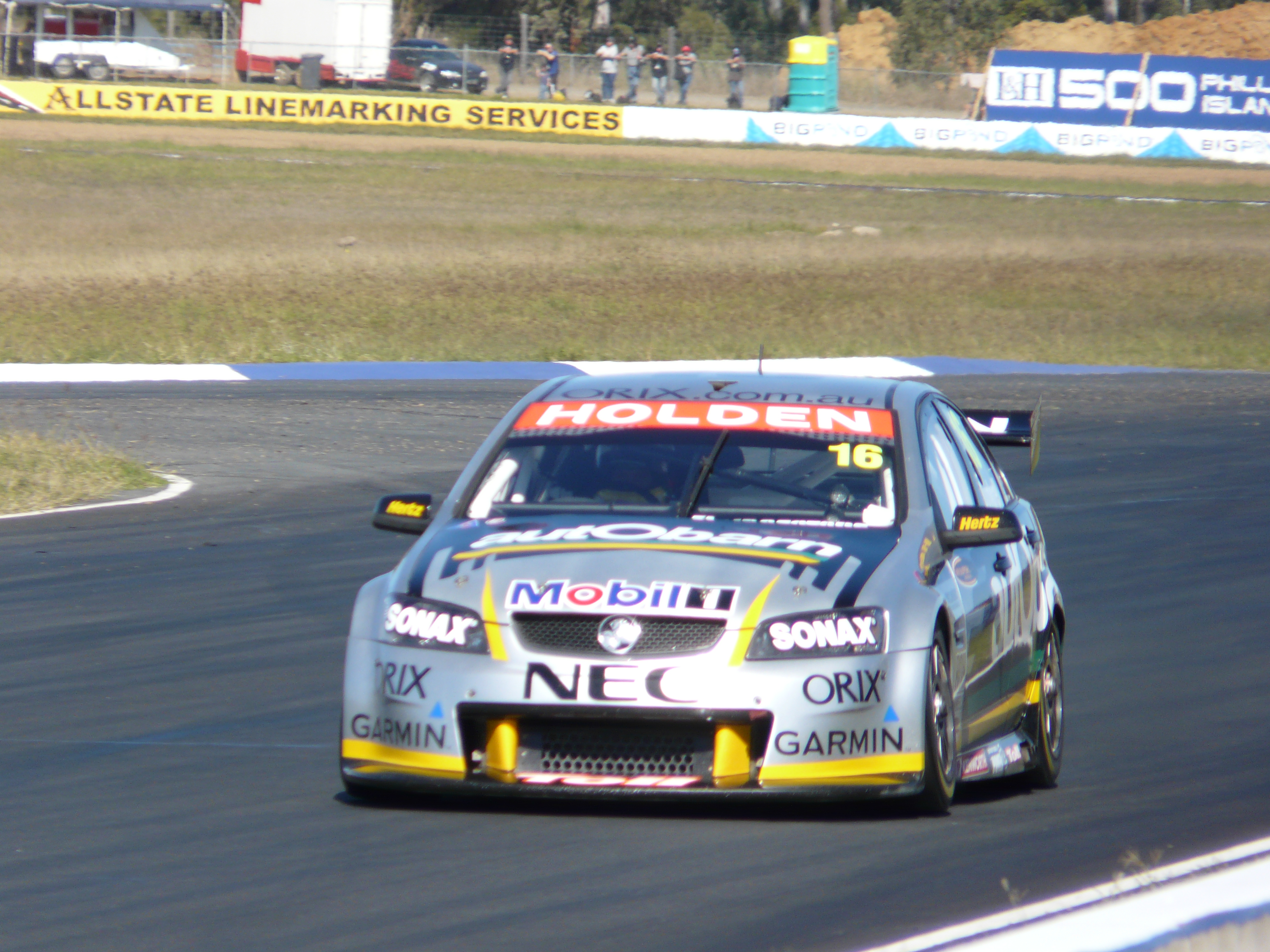
The Holden VE Commodore of Paul Dumbrell at Queensland Raceway 2008.

In 2008, Dumbrell joined the HSV Dealer Team to drive the No. 16 Autobarn Holden Commodore, as teammate to 2006 V8 Supercar Champion, Rick Kelly. It was a difficult season for the team and Dumbrell finished 21st in the championship.

==== Walkinshaw Racing ====
In 2009, Dumbrell stayed under the Walkinshaw umbrella with the newly formed Walkinshaw Racing, the team which replaced the newly-defunct HSV Dealer Team. He drove an Autobarn-sponsored Holden VE Commodore.

==== Rod Nash Racing ====
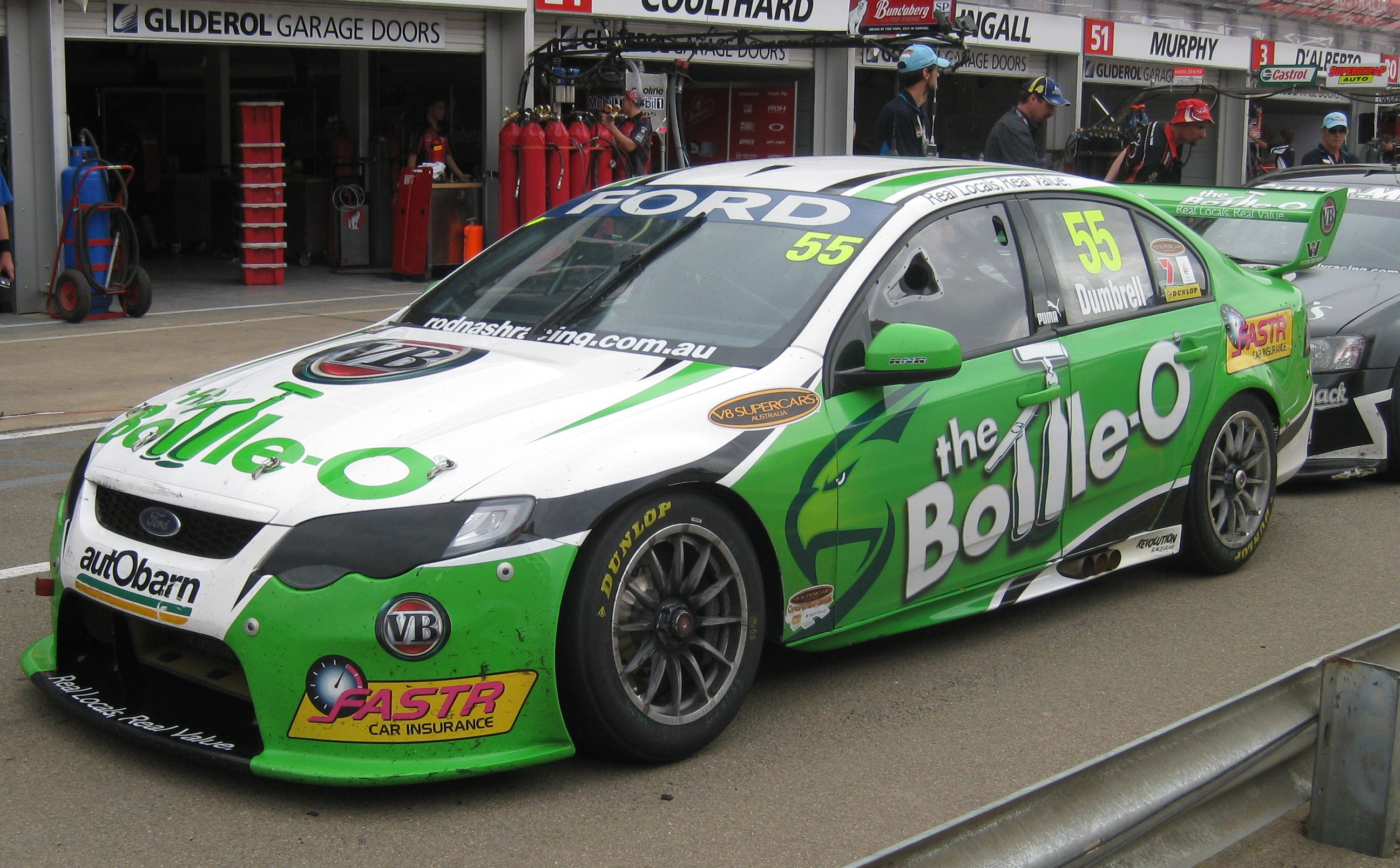
The Ford FG Falcon of Paul Dumbrell at the 2010 Clipsal 500 Adelaide.

For the 2010 V8 Supercar season, Dumbrell signed with Rod Nash Racing to drive their No. 55, "The Bottle-O" sponsored, Ford Performance Racing prepared Ford FG Falcon in a deal encompassing 2010, 2011 and 2012 seasons. This marked his first experience of racing a Ford, having competed in Holdens throughout his V8 Supercar career.

Dumbrell recorded his first V8 Supercar Championship podium finish at the 2010 Falken Tasmania Challenge and followed this up with his first Championship race win and first Championship pole position at the next event, the 2010 Norton 360 Sandown Challenge. On 8 August 2011, Dumbrell announced he will retire from full-time driving at the end of the 2011 season.

=== Endurance co-driver ===
==== Triple Eight Race Engineering ====
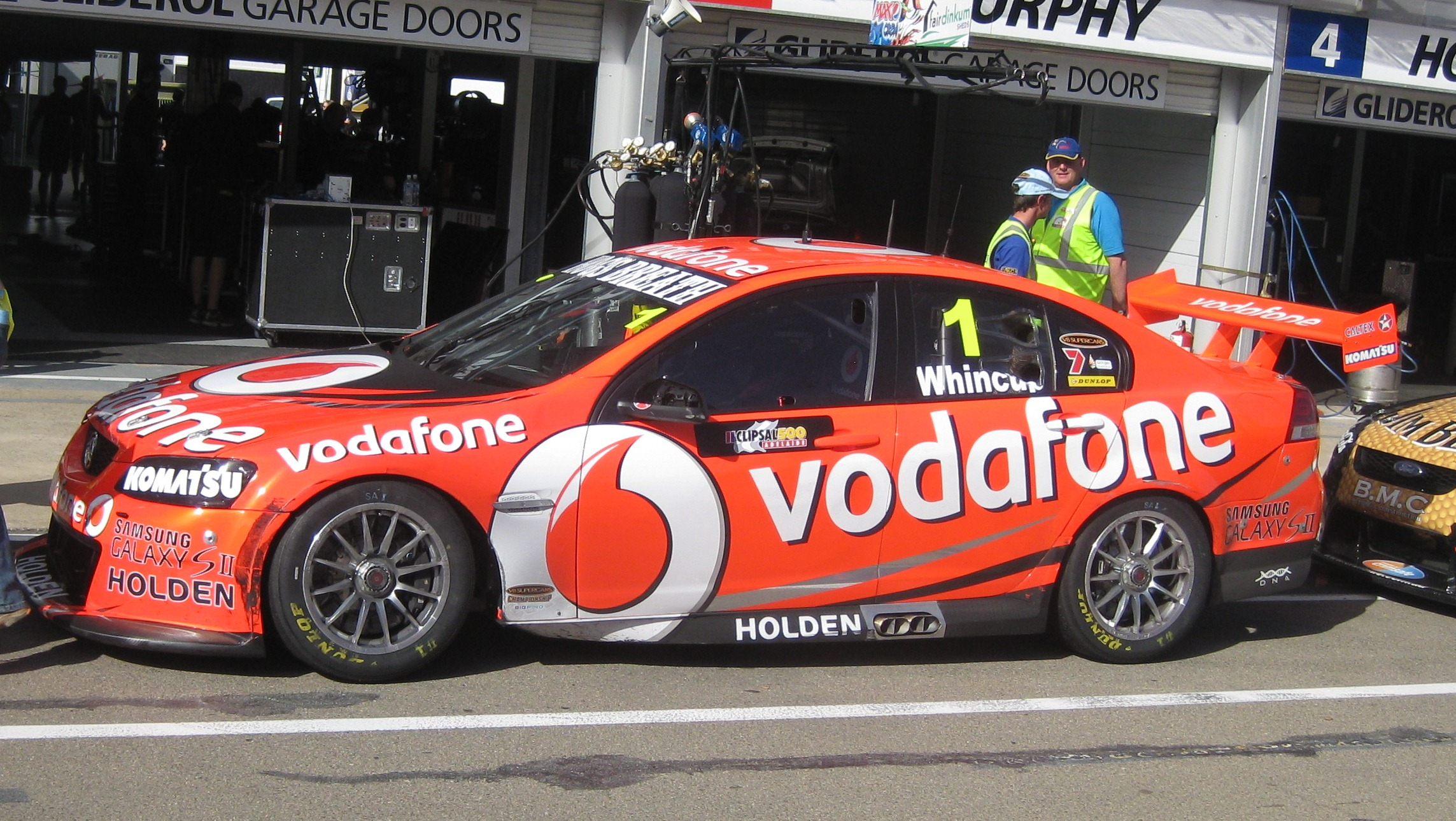
Jamie Whincup's 2012 car in which Dumbrell would later co-drive to victory at the 2012 Bathurst 1000

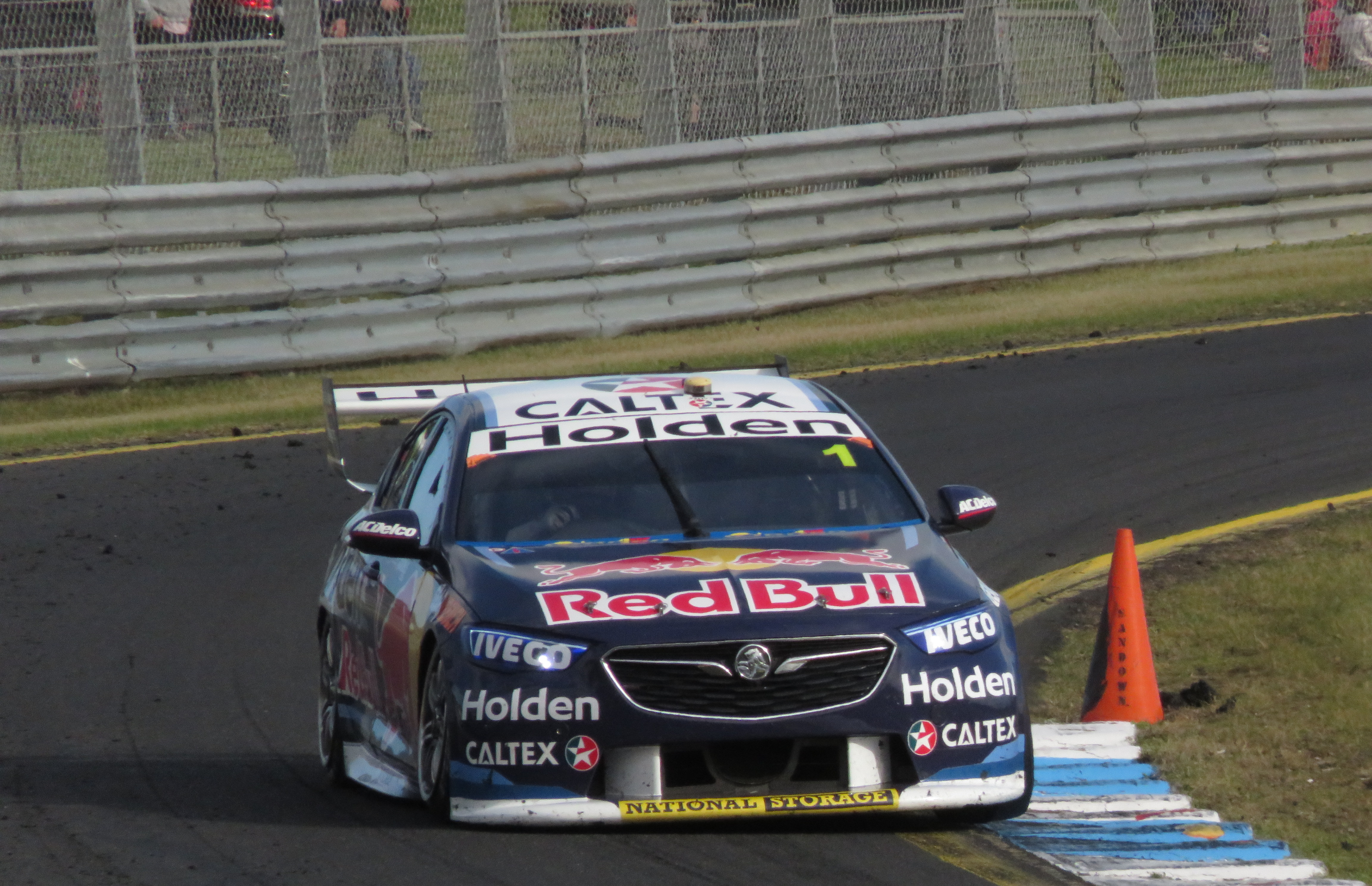
Paul Dumbrell won his third Sandown 500 in 2018, driving with Jamie Whincup

Despite his retirement from full-time racing, Dumbrell returned in a limited basis from 2012 onwards as a co-driver for the two-driver endurance races in V8 Supercars, the Sandown 500, Bathurst 1000 and since 2013, the Gold Coast 600. Dumbrell drives alongside seven-time series champion Jamie Whincup for Triple Eight Race Engineering.

Dumbrell and Whincup's partnership was almost immediately successful, winning the 2012 Supercheap Auto Bathurst 1000. In 2013, they won the 2013 Wilson Security Sandown 500. In 2014, Dumbrell and Whincup won the Enduro Cup as the highest scoring driver combination across the three endurance events, which included winning for a second year running at Sandown in the 2014 Wilson Security Sandown 500.

In 2014, Dumbrell entered the Dunlop V8 Supercar Development Series once again, and won the championship for a second time.

== Business ==
For much of his career, Dumbrell has balanced racing and business. He previously owned a Boost Juice franchise as early as 2002, and was a founding partner of a media company. He also progressed up the ranks of the family business, the Automotive Brands Group – owners of brands such as Autobarn and Autopro – eventually becoming chief executive officer in 2009. Dumbrell's increasing business commitments were cited by him as a reason for his full-time V8 Supercar retirement in 2011. Automotive Brands was sold to Metcash in 2012 with Dumbrell remaining in charge of the automotive business at Metcash, and taking a place on their executive team. Coincidentally Metcash also owned The Bottle-O, a previous sponsor of Dumbrell at Rod Nash Racing. In 2015, the business was again sold, to Burson Group, in an AU$275 million deal. Dumbrell once again remained in charge of the division, and at the announcement of the deal, Burson CEO Darryl Abotomey indicated that there was no reason Dumbrell couldn't continue as an endurance co-driver in the V8 Supercars series alongside his business commitments.

== Career results ==
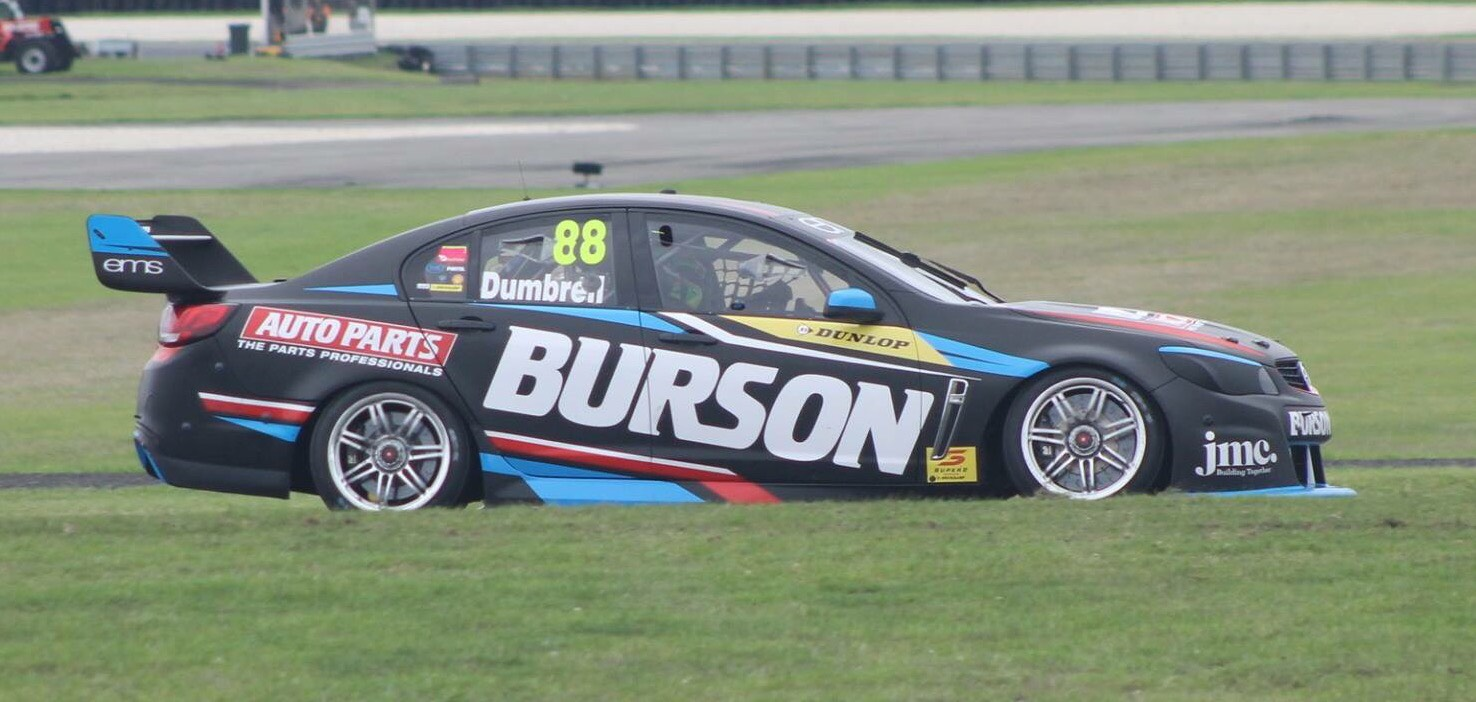
Dumbrell contested the 2017 Dunlop Super2 Series in a Holden VF Commodore for Eggleston Motorsport

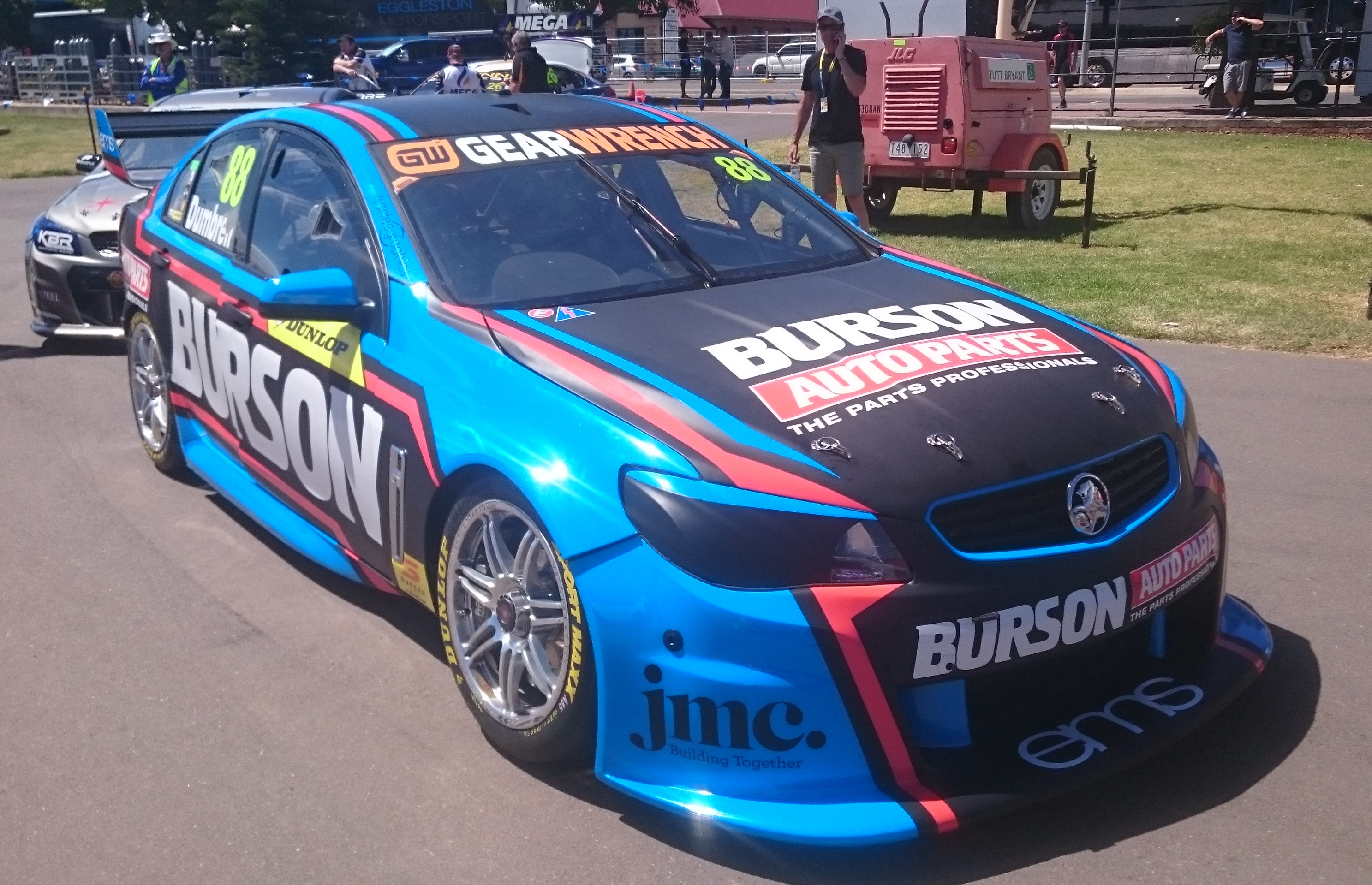
Dumbrell placed second in the 2018 Dunlop Super2 Series driving a Holden Commodore VF

Season	Series	Position	Car	Team
1998	Victorian Sports Sedan Championship		Holden Commodore	Paul Dumbrell
1999	Australian Drivers' Championship	6th	Reynard 94D Holden	Badia Court
1999	Shell Championship Series	NC	Holden VS Commodore	John Faulkner Racing
2000	Australian Drivers' Championship	6th	Reynard 93D Holden	K Mart Racing
2000	Formula Holden Tasman Cup	5th	Reynard 93D Holden	Wynns Racing
2001	Konica V8 Supercar Series	**2nd**	Holden VT Commodore	Gibson Motorsport
2001	Shell Championship Series	59th	Holden VX Commodore	Garry Rogers Motorsport
2002	Konica V8 Supercar Series	**1st**	Holden VX Commodore	Independent Race Cars Australia
2002	V8 Supercar Championship Series	37th	Holden VX Commodore	Castrol Perkins Motorsport
2003	V8 Supercar Championship Series	29th	Holden VX Commodore	Castrol Perkins Motorsport
2004	V8 Supercar Championship Series	24th	Holden VX Commodore; Holden VY Commodore	Castrol Perkins Motorsport
2005	V8 Supercar Championship Series	20th	Holden VY Commodore; Holden VZ Commodore	Castrol Perkins Motorsport
2006	V8 Supercar Championship Series	12th	Holden VZ Commodore	Jack Daniel's Racing
2007	V8 Supercar Championship Series	23rd	Holden VE Commodore	Paul Weel Racing
2008	V8 Supercar Championship Series	21st	Holden VE Commodore	HSV Dealer Team
2009	V8 Supercar Championship Series	15th	Holden VE Commodore	Walkinshaw Racing
2010	V8 Supercar Championship Series	9th	Ford FG Falcon	Rod Nash Racing
2011	International V8 Supercars Championship	24th	Ford FG Falcon	Rod Nash Racing
2012	International V8 Supercars Championship	29th	Holden VE Commodore	Triple Eight Race Engineering
2013	International V8 Supercars Championship	30th	Holden VF Commodore	Triple Eight Race Engineering
2014	Dunlop V8 Supercar Series	**1st**	Holden VE Commodore	Eggleston Motorsport
2014	International V8 Supercars Championship	26th	Holden VF Commodore	Triple Eight Race Engineering
2015	V8 Supercars Dunlop Series	**2nd**	Holden VE Commodore	Eggleston Motorsport
2015	International V8 Supercars Championship	41st	Holden VF Commodore	Triple Eight Race Engineering
2016	Supercars Dunlop Series	7th	Holden VE Commodore	Eggleston Motorsport
2016	International V8 Supercars Championship	30th	Holden VF Commodore	Triple Eight Race Engineering
2017	Dunlop Super2 Series	**2nd**	Holden VF Commodore	Eggleston Motorsport
2017	Virgin Australia Supercars Championship	31st	Holden VF Commodore	Triple Eight Race Engineering
2018	Dunlop Super2 Series	**2nd**	Holden VF Commodore	Eggleston Motorsport
2018	Virgin Australia Supercars Championship	32nd	Holden VF Commodore	Triple Eight Race Engineering

=== Super2 Series results ===
(key) (Races in bold indicate pole position) (Races in italics indicate fastest lap)

Year	Team	Car	1	2	3	4	5	6	7	8	9	10	11	12	13	14	15	16	17	18	19	20	21	Position	Points
2001	Gibson Motorsport	Holden VT Commodore	WAK; R1; 10	WAK; R2; 1	WAK; R3; 7	ORA; R4; 3	ORA; R5; 7	ORA; R6; 6	WIN; R7; 11	WIN; R8; 2	WIN; R9; 2	**PHI**; **R10**; 6	PHI; R11; 3	PHI; R12; 2	LAK; R13; 9	LAK; R14; 1	**LAK**; **R15**; 1	MAL; R16; 2	MAL; R17; 17	MAL; R18; 5				2nd	1190
2002	Independent Race Cars Australia	Holden VX Commodore	WAK; R1; 1	**WAK**; **R2**; 4	WAK; R3; 2	**PHI**; **R4**; 1	**PHI**; **R5**; 1	**PHI**; **R6**; 1	**ORA**; **R7**; 1	**ORA**; **R8**; 1	**ORA**; **R9**; 1	**WIN**; **R10**; 1	**WIN**; **R11**; 1	**WIN**; **R12**; 1	**MAL**; **R13**; 1	**MAL**; **R14**; 2	MAL; R15; 1							1st	1322
2014	Eggleston Motorsport	Holden VE Commodore	ADE; R1; 3	ADE; R2; 1	WIN; R3; 5	WIN; R4; 2	BAR; R5; 1	BAR; R6; DNS	TOW; R7; 2	TOW; R8; 4	QLD; R9; 1	**QLD**; **R10**; **1**	**BAT**; **R11**; **1**	**SYD**; **R12**; **1**	SYD; R13; Ret									1st	1686
2015	Eggleston Motorsport	Holden VE Commodore	ADE; R1; 2	ADE; R2; 1	BAR; R3; 4	BAR; R4; 10	BAR; R5; 2	WIN; R6; 3	WIN; R7; 3	WIN; R8; 3	TOW; R9; 5	TOW; R10; 1	QLD; R11; 3	QLD; R12; 4	QLD; R13; 2	**BAT**; **R14**; 1	**SYD**; **R15**; 1	SYD; R16; 1						2nd	1889
2016	Eggleston Motorsport	Holden VE Commodore	ADE; R1; 1	ADE; R2; Ret	PHI; R3; 3	PHI; R4; 5	PHI; R5; 23	BAR; R6; 4	BAR; R7; 3	BAR; R8; 8	TOW; R9; Ret	TOW; R10; 2	SAN; R11; 3	SAN; R12; 1	**SAN**; **R13**; 19	BAT; R14; 1	SYD; R15	SYD; R16						7th	1216
2017	Eggleston Motorsport	Holden VF Commodore	**ADE**; **R1**; 1	**ADE**; **R2**; 1	**ADE**; **R3**; 2	**SYM**; **R4**; 1	**SYM**; **R5**; 1	**SYM**; **R6**; 4	SYM; R7; 2	PHI; R8; 6	PHI; R9; 2	PHI; R10; 4	PHI; R11; 3	TOW; R12; 2	TOW; R13; 15	SMP; R14; 1	**SMP**; **R15**; 1	**SMP**; **R16**; 4	SMP; R17; 5	**SAN**; **R18**; 1	SAN; R19; 3	NEW; R20; 8	NEW; R21; 13	2nd	1713
2018	Eggleston Motorsport	Holden VF Commodore	ADE; R1; 1	**ADE**; **R2**; 2	ADE; R3; 1	SYM; R4; 1	SYM; R5; 5	SYM; R6; 1	BAR; R7; 14	BAR; R8; 1	**BAR**; **R9**; 2	TOW; R10; 2	TOW; R11; 2	SAN; R12; 2	SAN; R13; 2	BAT; R14; Ret	NEW; R15; 5	NEW; R16; C						2nd	1463

=== Supercars Championship results ===
(Races in bold indicate pole position) (Races in italics indicate fastest lap)

Supercars results
Year	Team	Car	1	2	3	4	5	6	7	8	9	10	11	12	13	14	15	16	17	18	19	20	21	22	23	24	25	26	27	28	29	30	31	32	33	34	35	36	37	38	39	Position	Points
1999	John Faulkner Racing	Holden VS Commodore	EAS; R1; WD	EAS; R2; WD	EAS; R3; WD	ADE; R4	BAR; R5	BAR; R6	BAR; R7	PHI; R8	PHI; R9	PHI; R10	HDV; R11	HDV; R12	HDV; R13	SAN; R14	SAN; R15	SAN; R16	QLD; R17	QLD; R18	QLD; R19	CAL; R20	CAL; R21	CAL; R22	SYM; R23; 26	SYM; R24; Ret	SYM; R25; Ret	WIN; R26	WIN; R27	WIN; R28	ORA; R29	ORA; R30	ORA; R31	QLD; R32; Ret	BAT; R33; Ret							NC	0
2000	Rod Nash Racing	Holden VT Commodore	PHI; R1	PHI; R2	BAR; R3	BAR; R4	BAR; R5	ADE; R6	ADE; R7	EAS; R8	EAS; R9	EAS; R10	HDV; R11	HDV; R12	HDV; R13	CAN; R14	CAN; R15	CAN; R16	QLD; R17	QLD; R18	QLD; R19	WIN; R20	WIN; R21	WIN; R22	ORA; R23	ORA; R24	ORA; R25	CAL; R26	CAL; R27	CAL; R28	QLD; R29	SAN; R30	SAN; R31	SAN; R32	BAT; R33; Ret							NC	0
2001	Garry Rogers Motorsport	Holden VX Commodore	PHI; R1	PHI; R2	ADE; R3	ADE; R4	EAS; R5	EAS; R6	HDV; R7	HDV; R8	HDV; R9	CAN; R10	CAN; R11	CAN; R12	BAR; R13	BAR; R14	BAR; R15	CAL; R16	CAL; R17	CAL; R18	ORA; R19	ORA; R20	QLD; R21; 12	WIN; R22	WIN; R23	BAT; R24; Ret	PUK; R25	PUK; R26	PUK; R27	SAN; R28	SAN; R29	SAN; R30										59th	168
2002	Perkins Engineering	Holden VX Commodore	ADE; R1	ADE; R2	PHI; R3	PHI; R4	EAS; R5	EAS; R6	EAS; R7	HDV; R8	HDV; R9	HDV; R10	CAN; R11	CAN; R12	CAN; R13	BAR; R14	BAR; R15	BAR; R16	ORA; R17	ORA; R18	WIN; R19	WIN; R20	QLD; R21; 7	BAT; R22; 5	SUR; R23	SUR; R24	PUK; R25	PUK; R26	PUK; R27	SAN; R28	SAN; R29											37th	160
2003	Perkins Engineering	Holden VX Commodore	ADE; R1; 11	ADE; R1; 8	PHI; R3; 31	EAS; R4; 20	WIN; R5; Ret	BAR; R6; 19	BAR; R7; 26	BAR; R8; Ret	HDV; R9; 27	HDV; R10; 22	HDV; R11; Ret	QLD; R12; 13	ORA; R13; 17	SAN; R14; Ret	BAT; R15; 14	SUR; R16; 26	SUR; R17; 21	PUK; R18; 24	PUK; R19; 28	PUK; R20; 17	EAS; R21; 21	EAS; R22; 12																		29th	887
2004	Perkins Engineering	Holden VY Commodore	ADE; R1; 8	ADE; R2; 11	EAS; R3; 30	PUK; R4; 30	PUK; R5; 24	PUK; R6; 27	HDV; R7; 20	HDV; R8; 14	HDV; R9; 17	BAR; R10; 24	BAR; R11; 20	BAR; R12; 27	QLD; R13; 7	WIN; R14; 16	ORA; R15; 18	ORA; R16; 23	SAN; R17; 8	BAT; R18; Ret	SUR; R19; Ret	SUR; R20; 17	SYM; R21; 24	SYM; R22; 23	SYM; R23; 23	EAS; R24; 16	EAS; R25; 25	EAS; R26; 24														24th	1018
2005	Perkins Engineering	Holden VY Commodore	ADE; R1; 16	ADE; R2; 5	PUK; R3; 26	PUK; R4; 16	PUK; R5; Ret				EAS; R9; 16	EAS; R10; Ret				HDV; R14; Ret	HDV; R15; 15	HDV; R16; 10	QLD; R17; 18	ORA; R18; 17	ORA; R19; 24	SAN; R20; 13	BAT; R21; Ret	SUR; R22; 22	SUR; R23; 18	SUR; R24; 22	SYM; R25; 6	SYM; R26; 6	SYM; R27; 11	PHI; R28; 9	PHI; R29; 15	PHI; R30; 19										20th	1046
2005	Rod Nash Racing	Holden VZ Commodore						BAR; R6; 22	BAR; R7; Ret	BAR; R8; 24			SHA; R11; 19	SHA; R12; 12	SHA; R13; 11																											20th	1046
2006	Perkins Engineering	Holden VZ Commodore	ADE; R1; 12	ADE; R2; 6	PUK; R3; 10	PUK; R4; 11	PUK; R5; 11	BAR; R6; 11	BAR; R7; 20	BAR; R8; 12	WIN; R9; 3	WIN; R10; 14	WIN; R11; 7	HDV; R12; 8	HDV; R13; Ret	HDV; R14; 13	QLD; R15; 15	QLD; R16; Ret	QLD; R17; 15	ORA; R18; 14	ORA; R19; 12	ORA; R20; Ret	SAN; R21; 28	BAT; R22; 5	SUR; R23; 12	SUR; R24; Ret	SUR; R25; Ret	SYM; R26; 8	SYM; R27; 7	SYM; R28; 8	BHR; R29; 11	BHR; R30; 15	BHR; R31; 14	PHI; R32; 16	PHI; R33; 20	PHI; R34; 13						12th	2332
2007	Paul Weel Racing	Holden VE Commodore	ADE; R1; Ret	ADE; R2; 20	BAR; R3; 18	BAR; R4; 17	BAR; R5; Ret	PUK; R6; 22	PUK; R7; Ret	PUK; R8; Ret	WIN; R9; 25	WIN; R10; 25	WIN; R11; 21	EAS; R12; Ret	EAS; R13; 19	EAS; R14; 18	HDV; R15; 24	HDV; R16; 21	HDV; R17; 17	QLD; R18	QLD; R19	QLD; R20	ORA; R21; 25	ORA; R22; 25	ORA; R23; 10	SAN; R24; 6	BAT; R25; 12	SUR; R26; 21	SUR; R27; Ret	SUR; R28; Ret	BHR; R29; 14	BHR; R30; Ret	BHR; R31; 14	SYM; R32; 13	SYM; R33; 16	SYM; R34; Ret	PHI; R35; 25	PHI; R36; Ret	PHI; R37; 19			23rd	69
2008	HSV Dealer Team	Holden VE Commodore	ADE; R1; Ret	ADE; R2; Ret	EAS; R3; 16	EAS; R4; 12	EAS; R5; 9	HAM; R6; 14	HAM; R7; 11	HAM; R8; Ret	BAR; R9; 15	BAR; R10; 22	BAR; R11; 16	SAN; R12; 12	SAN; R13; 13	SAN; R14; 27	HDV; R15; 17	HDV; R16; 11	HDV; R17; 14	QLD; R18; 11	QLD; R19; 11	QLD; R20; 20	WIN; R21; 15	WIN; R22; 10	WIN; R23; 8	PHI; Q Ret	PHI; R24; Ret	BAT; R25; 20	SUR; R26; 8	SUR; R27; Ret	SUR; R28; 16	BHR; R29; 12	BHR; R30; 18	BHR; R31; 11	SYM; R32; 21	SYM; R33; 13	SYM; R34; 20	ORA; R35; 19	ORA; R36; 16	ORA; R37; 13		21st	1398
2009	Walkinshaw Racing	Holden VE Commodore	ADE; R1; 17	ADE; R2; 17	HAM; R3; 18	HAM; R4; 23	WIN; R5; 16	WIN; R6; 4	SYM; R7; 23	SYM; R8; 17	HDV; R9; 14	HDV; R10; 6	TOW; R11; 11	TOW; R12; 8	SAN; R13; 23	SAN; R14; 10	QLD; R15; 22	QLD; R16; 5	PHI; Q 6	PHI; R17; 8	BAT; R18; 21	SUR; R19; 8	SUR; R20; 22	SUR; R21; 11	SUR; R22; 20	PHI; R23; 12	PHI; R24; 8	BAR; R25; 16	BAR; R26; 12	SYD; R27; Ret	SYD; R28; 13											17th	1627
2010	Rod Nash Racing	Ford FG Falcon	YMC; R1; 7	YMC; R2; 12	BHR; R3; 27	BHR; R4; 10	ADE; R5; 5	ADE; R6; 5	HAM; R7; 9	HAM; R8; 20	QLD; R9; 21	QLD; R10; 19	WIN; R11; 28	WIN; R12; 10	HDV; R13; 8	HDV; R14; 23	TOW; R15; 10	TOW; R16; 4	PHI; R17; 7	BAT; R18; 14	SUR; R19; 22	SUR; R20; 5	SYM; R21; 4	SYM; R22; 2	SAN; R23; 1	**SAN**; **R24**; **7**	SYD; R25; 10	SYD; R26; 15														9th	2232
2011	Rod Nash Racing	Ford FG Falcon	YMC; R1; 25	YMC; R2; 10	ADE; R3; 25	ADE; R4; 6	HAM; R5; DNS	HAM; R6; 19	BAR; R7; Ret	BAR; R8; 19	BAR; R9; 14	WIN; R10; 5	WIN; R11; 18	HID; R12; 20	HID; R13; 11	TOW; R14; 12	TOW; R15; 10	QLD; R16; 14	QLD; R17; 25	QLD; R18; 24	PHI; R19; 23	BAT; R20; Ret	SUR; R21; 15	SUR; R22; Ret	SYM; R23; 13	**SYM**; **R24**; **4**	SAN; R25; 12	SAN; R26; Ret	SYD; R27; Ret	SYD; R28; Ret												24th	1242
2012	Triple Eight Race Engineering	Holden VE Commodore	ADE; R1	ADE; R2	SYM; R3	SYM; R4	HAM; R5	HAM; R6	BAR; R7	BAR; R8	BAR; R9	PHI; R10	PHI; R11	HID; R12	HID; R13	TOW; R14	TOW; R15	QLD; R16	QLD; R17	SMP; R18	SMP; R19	SAN; QR; 2	SAN; R20; 3	BAT; R21; 1	SUR; R22	SUR; R23	YMC; R24	YMC; R25	YMC; R26	WIN; R27	WIN; R28	SYD; R29	SYD; R30									29th	534
2013	Triple Eight Race Engineering	Holden VF Commodore	ADE; R1	ADE; R2	SYM; R3	SYM; R4	SYM; R5	PUK; R6	PUK; R7	PUK; R8	PUK; R9	BAR; R10	BAR; R11	BAR; R12	COA; R13	COA; R14	COA; R15	COA; R16	HID; R17	HID; R18	HID; R19	TOW; R20	TOW; R21	QLD; R22	QLD; R23	QLD; R24	WIN; R25	WIN; R26	WIN; R27	SAN; R28; 1	BAT; R29; 2	SUR; R30; Ret	SUR; R31; 4	PHI; R32	PHI; R33	PHI; R34	SYD; R35	SYD; R36				30th	696
2014	Triple Eight Race Engineering	Holden VF Commodore	ADE; R1	ADE; R2	ADE; R3	SYM; R4	SYM; R5	SYM; R6	WIN; R7	WIN; R8	WIN; R9	PUK; R10	PUK; R11	PUK; R12	PUK; R13	BAR; R14	BAR; R15	BAR; R16	HID; R17	HID; R18	HID; R19	TOW; R20	TOW; R21	TOW; R22	QLD; R23	QLD; R24	QLD; R25	SMP; R26	SMP; R27	SMP; R28	SAN; QR; 1	**SAN**; **R29**; **1**	BAT; R30; 5	SUR; R31; 2	SUR; R32; 1	PHI; R33	PHI; R34	PHI; R35	SYD; R36	SYD; R37	SYD; R38	26th	810
2015	Triple Eight Race Engineering	Holden VF Commodore	ADE; R1	ADE; R2	ADE; R3	SYM; R4	SYM; R5	SYM; R6	BAR; R7	BAR; R8	BAR; R9	WIN; R10	WIN; R11	WIN; R12	HID; R13	HID; R14	HID; R15	TOW; R16	TOW; R17	QLD; R18	QLD; R19	QLD; R20	SMP; R21	SMP; R22	SMP; R23	SAN; QR; 1	**SAN**; **R24**; **15**	BAT; R25; 18	SUR; R26; 24	SUR; R27; 7	PUK; R28	PUK; R29	PUK; R30									41st	410
2015	Lucas Dumbrell Motorsport	Holden VF Commodore																																PHI; R31; 21	PHI; R32; 21	PHI; R33; 21	SYD; R34	SYD; R35	SYD; R36			41st	410
2016	Triple Eight Race Engineering	Holden VF Commodore	ADE; R1	ADE; R2	ADE; R3	SYM; R4	SYM; R5	PHI; R6	PHI; R7	BAR; R8	BAR; R9	WIN; R10	WIN; R11	HID; R12	HID; R13	TOW; R14	TOW; R15	QLD; R16	QLD; R17	SMP; R18	SMP; R19	SAN; QR; 1	**SAN**; **R20**; **13**	BAT; R21; 11	SUR; R22; 3	SUR; R23; 1	PUK; R24	PUK; R25	PUK; R26	PUK; R27	SYD; R28	SYD; R29										30th	555
2017	Triple Eight Race Engineering	Holden VF Commodore	ADE; R1	ADE; R2	SYM; R3	SYM; R4	PHI; R5	PHI; R6	BAR; R7	BAR; R8	WIN; R9	WIN; R10	HID; R11	HID; R12	TOW; R13	TOW; R14	QLD; R15	QLD; R16	SMP; R17	SMP; R18	SAN; R19; 6	BAT; R20; 20	SUR; R21; 6	SUR; R22; 2	PUK; R23	PUK; R24	NEW; R25	NEW; R26														31st	534
2018	Triple Eight Race Engineering	Holden ZB Commodore	ADE; R1	ADE; R2	MEL; R3	MEL; R4	MEL; R5	MEL; R6	SYM; R7	SYM; R8	PHI; R9	PHI; R10	BAR; R11	BAR; R12	WIN; R13	WIN; R14	HID; R15	HID; R16	TOW; R17	TOW; R18	QLD; R19	QLD; R20	SMP; R21	BEN; R22	BEN; R23	SAN; R24; 1	BAT; R25; 10	SUR; R26; 14	SUR; R27; C	PUK; R28	PUK; R29	NEW; R30	NEW; R31									32nd	519

=== Complete Bathurst 1000 results ===
Year	Team	Car	Co-driver	Position	Laps
1999	John Faulkner Racing	Holden Commodore VS	(Australia) Matthew White	DNF	11
2000	Rod Nash Racing	Holden Commodore VT	(Australia) Rod Nash	DNF	13
2001	Garry Rogers Motorsport	Holden Commodore VX	(Australia) Leanne Ferrier	DNF	41
2002	Perkins Engineering	Holden Commodore VX	(Australia) Larry Perkins	5th	161
2003	Perkins Engineering	Holden Commodore VX	(Australia) Tomas Mezera	14th	155
2004	Perkins Engineering	Holden Commodore VY	(Australia) Tony Longhurst	DNF	129
2005	Perkins Engineering	Holden Commodore VZ	(New Zealand) Steven Richards	DNF	28
2006	Perkins Engineering	Holden Commodore VZ	(New Zealand) Steven Richards	5th	161
2007	Paul Weel Racing	Holden Commodore VE	(Australia) Paul Weel	12th	161
2008	HSV Dealer Team	Holden Commodore VE	(Australia) Rick Kelly (Australia) David Reynolds‡	20th	127
2009	Holden Racing Team	Holden Commodore VE	(New Zealand) Craig Baird	21st	153
2010	Rod Nash Racing	Ford Falcon FG	(Australia) Dean Canto	14th	161
2011	Rod Nash Racing	Ford Falcon FG	(Australia) Dean Canto	DNF	144
2012	Triple Eight Race Engineering	Holden Commodore VE	(Australia) Jamie Whincup	**1st**	161
2013	Triple Eight Race Engineering	Holden Commodore VF	(Australia) Jamie Whincup	**2nd**	161
2014	Triple Eight Race Engineering	Holden Commodore VF	(Australia) Jamie Whincup	5th	161
2015	Triple Eight Race Engineering	Holden Commodore VF	(Australia) Jamie Whincup	18th	161
2016	Triple Eight Race Engineering	Holden Commodore VF	(Australia) Jamie Whincup	11th	161
2017	Triple Eight Race Engineering	Holden Commodore VF	(Australia) Jamie Whincup	20th	124
2018	Triple Eight Race Engineering	Holden Commodore ZB	(Australia) Jamie Whincup	10th	161

‡ Kelly replaced Reynolds in the No. 16 post-qualifying after an event-ending accident for Rick's original car.

Sporting positions
Preceded by Simon Wills	Winner of the Konica V8 Supercar Series; 2002	Succeeded by Mark Winterbottom
Preceded by Garth Tander; Nick Percat	Winner of the Bathurst 1000; 2012 (with Jamie Whincup)	Succeeded by Mark Winterbottom; Steven Richards
Preceded by Craig Lowndes; Warren Luff	Winner of the Pirtek Endurance Cup; 2014 (with Jamie Whincup)	Succeeded by Garth Tander; Warren Luff
Preceded by Dale Wood	Winner of the Dunlop V8 Supercar Series; 2014	Succeeded by Cam Waters
