= David Parsons (racing driver, born 1955) =

Australian racing driver

- Nationality: Australian
- Born: 21 March 1955 (age 71) Castlemaine, Australia

Australian Touring Car Championship
- Years active: 1995–2001
- Teams: Truckie Parsons, Gibson Motorsport
- Best finish: 20th in 1999

David John 'Truckie' Parsons (born 1955) is a former racing driver from Castlemaine in Victoria, Australia. He raced his own car in selected races of the 1995, 1996 and 1997 seasons of the Australian Touring Car Championship, as well as Bathurst 1000 and other races for his own and other teams.

In 1999, Parsons paired up with another driver by the name of David Parsons in a Gibson Motorsport Commodore for the 1999 FAI 1000. They also competed in the Queensland 500 in a strong campaign that saw them finish fifth and the first of the privateers.

== Racing record ==
=== Career summary ===
| Season | Series | Team | Races | Wins | Poles | F. Laps | Podiums | Points | Position |
|---|---|---|---|---|---|---|---|---|---|
| 1995 | Australian Touring Car Championship | Parsons Transport | 6 | 0 | 0 | 0 | 0 | 0 | N/A |
| 1999 | Shell Championship Series | Gibson Motorsport; Robert Smith Racing | 30 | 0 | 0 | 0 | 0 | 670 | 20th |
| 2000 | Shell Championship Series | Gibson Motorsport | 1 | 0 | 0 | 0 | 0 | 132 | 31st |
| 2001 | Shell Championship Series | Gibson Motorsport | 2 | 0 | 0 | 0 | 0 | 144 | 67th |
| 2001 | Konica V8 Supercar Series | Gibson Motorsport | 18 | 3 | 1 | 1 | 8 | 1168 | 3rd |

=== Complete Bathurst 1000 results ===
| Year | Team | Car | Co-driver | Position | Laps |
|---|---|---|---|---|---|
| 1996 | Parsons Transport | Holden Commodore (VR) | (Australia) Rodney Crick | DNF | 127 |
| 1996 | Greg Crick Racing | Holden Commodore (VR) | (Australia) Greg Crick | DNF | 139 |
| 1998 | Robert Smith Racing | Holden Commodore (VS) | (Australia) Robert Smith | DNF | 56 |
| 1999 | Gibson Motorsport | Holden Commodore (VT) | (Australia) David "Skippy" Parsons | 11th | 159 |
| 2000 | Gibson Motorsport | Holden Commodore (VT) | (Australia) Darren Hossack | 9th | 161 |
| 2001 | Gibson Motorsport | Ford Falcon (AU) | (Australia) Rodney Forbes | 21st | 132 |
