= John Faulkner Racing =

- Manufacturer: Holden
- Team Principal: John Faulkner
- Chassis: Commodore VR, VS, VT & VX

John Faulkner Racing (JFR) was an Australian motor racing team that competed in AUSCAR, NASCAR and V8 Supercars racing in the 1990s and early 2000s

== History ==
John Faulkner Racing was formed by former Toyota Team Australia driver John Faulkner in the early 1990s. It initially competed in the AUSCAR series, later moving into the NASCAR series. In 1996, JFR entered the V8 Supercars series with a Holden Commodore VR purchased from the Holden Racing Team.

JFR would become a regular in the series until the end of 2002. It generally operated as a one car team, although after upgrading to a Commodore VT, entered its older VS in customer deals for Cameron McConville and Paul Dumbrell in 1999. Highlights included qualifying sixth at the 1996 Bathurst 1000, a fourth place at the 1997 Sandown 500 and winning the privateers series in 1997.

In 2003, JFR leased its Racing Entitlement Contract (REC) to Kelly Racing. After Kelly Racing purchased its own REC from 00 Motorsport mid-season, JFR's was returned and sold to Paul Weel Racing.

Meanwhile, JFR had relocated to Queensland and entered two Commodore VXs in the 2003 Development Series for Dale Brede and Tony D'Alberto under the Holden Young Lions banner. The program continued in 2004 with Michael Caruso, Alan Gurr, Steve Owen and Kurt Wimmer driving. The team also contested selected rounds of the V8 Supercars in both 2003 & 2004, primarily running in the Sandown 500 & Bathurst 1000. The team closed at the end of 2004.

== Drivers ==
=== Supercars Championship Drivers ===
- (New Zealand) John Faulkner (1997–2002)
- (Australia) Cameron McConville (1999)
- (Australia) Paul Dumbrell (1999)
- (Australia) Matthew White (1999)
- (New Zealand) Simon Wills (1999)
- (Australia) Adam Macrow (2000)
- (Australia) Ryan McLeod (2000)
- (Australia) Wayne Wakefield (2000)
- (New Zealand) Craig Baird (2001)
- (Australia) Peter Doulman (2001)
- (Australia) Rick Bates (2002)
- (Australia) Tony Ricciardello (2003)
- (Australia) Dale Brede (2003)
- (Australia) Christian D'Agostin (2004)
- (Australia) Vickram MDS (2004)

=== Super2 Drivers ===
- (Australia) Ryan McLeod (2000)
- (Australia) Owen Kelly (2001)
- (Australia) Dale Brede (2003)
- (Australia) Tony D'Alberto (2003)
- (Australia) Michael Caruso (2004)
- (Australia) Steve Owen (2004)
- (Australia) Alan Gurr (2004)
- (Australia) Kurt Wimmer (2004)
