= Cameron McLean =

Australian former racing driver (born 1967)

- Nationality: Australian
- Born: 14 December 1967 (age 58) Brisbane, Queensland

V8 Supercars
- Teams: Dick Johnson Racing; Kmart Racing; Stone Brothers Racing; Ford Performance Racing; Garry Rogers Motorsport.
- Starts: 118
- Podiums: 1
- Poles: 0
- Fastest laps: 0
- Best finish: 18th in 1999

Championship titles
- 1995 1994: Australian Sports Sedan Championship; Queensland Sports Sedan Championship

Cameron Anthony McLean (born 14 December 1967) is an Australian former racing driver who most notably competed in the V8 Supercars Championship primarily for Greenfield Mowers Racing. He was also the 1995 Australian Sports Sedan champion.

== Career summary ==
McLean began his career in karting at the age of 14. Sometime thereafter, he graduated to car racing, culminating in him winning the Queensland Sports Sedan Championship in 1994. The following year, he would win the 1995 Australian Sports Sedan Championship in a BMW M3 for Greenfield Mowers Racing.

In 1996, McLean moved into the Australian Super Touring Championship, running as a privateer. In Australian Super Touring Championship and Australian Super Touring Championship, McLean won the TOCA Challenge Independents Cup. His 1998 campaign was his most successful with eleven podiums and finished fourth overall in the drivers standings.

In 1999, McLean and Greenfield Mowers Racing made the step up to the Shell Championship Series in an ex Dick Johnson Racing Ford Falcon EL. Initially struggling with the car setup, McLean's season was highlighted with notable results, including a sixth-place finish in the opening leg of the Adelaide 500 and was on course for a top five finish at the Bathurst 1000 before a front upright exploded and sent the Falcon into the wall nearly 20 laps from the finish.

Midway through the Championship Series, McLean, along with a consortium of three others, purchase Greenfield Mowers Racing to create Pragon Motorsport. Budgetary issues led to the team missing select rounds during the year. To bridge the gap, McLean signed on as a co-driver for Dick Johnson Racing. The campaign proved successful with McLean securing sixth place in the 2000 Queensland 500 with Paul Radisich and fourth in the Bathurst 1000 with Steven Johnson.

In 2001, McLean was slated to sign with Glenn Seton Racing to replace the outgoing Neil Crompton. However, as a consequence of Craig Lowndes' shift from the Holden Racing Team to Gibson Motorsport, the Ford outfit elected to sign the recently-exiled Steven Richards and forced McLean to return to Paragon Motorsport. Issues pertaining to budget persisted and, in anticipation of the Queensland 500, had brokered a sponsorship deal with VIP Petfoods. However, a legal juncture saw the car towed from the venue and forced McLean to sit out the weekend. Ahead of the Bathurst 1000, McLean signed to drive alongside Greg Ritter at Dick Johnson Racing. The car showed good pace all weekend and had briefly led the race after McLean pulled an audacious pass on leader Mark Skaife up Mountain Straight late in the race. However, after being bulked by Paul Morris and losing time in the pitlane, McLean and Ritter wound up finishing fourth on the road that day.

Paragon continued to struggle through 2002 and despite a good showing at Bathurst, the team folded before the year was up. This left McLean in limbo and was relegated to part-time drives in the series. For 2003, the co-drove in the endurance events with Andy Priaulx at Kelly Racing. The pairing struggled for results and their Bathurst event was almost immediately ended after contact on the first lap with Steve Owen.

For 2004, McLean would sign with Stone Brothers Racing to race in the endurance events with Russell Ingall. At the Sandown 500, McLean secured his first and only V8 Supercar podium by way of finishing second. The pairing would finish sixth at the Bathurst 1000. To keep race fit, he would also compete full-time in the Konica Minolta V8 Supercar Development Series for Howard Racing. He enjoyed a modestly successful season with four podiums to finish seventh in the driver standings. The next season, McLean would move to Ford Performance Racing to co-drive with Greg Ritter in the endurance events. He also competed in the Australian Carrera Cup Championship which was most notable for his spectacular rollover crash at Queensland Raceway.

By 2006, McLean's racing had reduced to a part-time schedule. For the Sandown 500, he drove for Ford Performance Racing alongside Matt Halliday, and in the Bathurst 1000, he raced for Garry Rogers Motorsport alongside Greg Ritter. He also competed in the New Zealand V8 series held over the summer break for Tony Richards Motorsport. He would return to the series over the next two seasons, achieving at least one podium each year.

Heading into the 2007 season, McLean re-signed with the Garry Rogers outfit to race alongside Ritter in the endurance events. In the Bathurst 1000, the pairing had enjoyed a decent showing throughout the majority of the race. However, with a handful of laps remaining, rain had started to descend upon the circuit. Most of the drivers remained on the circuit with warm slick tyres while Ritter elected to pit for wet tyres. Initially, the gamble appeared to pay off as he began to rapidly climb through the field. But as the rain began to dissipate, the track dried and the tyre advantage - along with their chances for victory - evaporated. Following this race, McLean elected to walk away from competitive V8 Supercar racing to devote more time toward his family and business ventures.

== Career results ==
=== Career summary ===
Season	Series	Team	Races	Wins	Poles	F. Laps	Podiums	Points	Position
1994	Queensland Sports Sedan Championship		?	?	?	?	?	?	**1st**
1995	Australian Sports Sedan Championship	Greenfield Mowers Racing	4	2	0	0	3	60	**1st**
1996	Australian Super Touring Championship	Greenfield Mowers Racing	16	0	0	0	0	39	9th
1997	Australian Super Touring Championship	Greenfield Mowers Racing	16	0	0	0	0	67	6th
1998	Australian Super Touring Championship	Greenfield Mowers Racing	16	0	0	2	11	139	4th
1999	Shell Championship Series	Greenfield Mowers Racing	34	0	0	0	0	721	18th
1999	Australian Super Touring Championship	Volvo Racing	3	0	0	0	1	23	13th
2000	Shell Championship Series	Greenfield Mowers Racing; Dick Johnson Racing	30	0	0	0	0	432	20th
2001	Shell Championship Series	Paragon Motorsport; Dick Johnson Racing	24	0	0	0	0	1128	25th
2002	V8 Supercar Championship Series	Paragon Motorsport	26	0	0	0	0	404	25th
2003	V8 Supercar Championship Series	John Kelly Racing	2	0	0	0	0	148	47th
2004	V8 Supercar Championship Series	Stone Brothers Racing	2	0	0	0	1	360	33rd
2004	Konica Minolta V8 Supercar Series	Howard Racing	17	0	0	0	4	725	7th
2005	V8 Supercar Championship Series	Ford Performance Racing	2	0	0	0	0	136	56th
2005	Australian Carrera Cup Championship	Sherrin Hire Pty Ltd	22	0	0	0	0	519	9th
2005	New Zealand V8s		3	0	0	0	0	30	38th
2006	V8 Supercar Championship Series	Ford Performance Racing; Garry Rogers Motorsport	2	0	0	0	0	200	48th
2006	New Zealand V8s	Tony Richards Motorsport	21	0	0	0	1	719	8th
2007	V8 Supercar Championship Series	Garry Rogers Motorsport	2	0	0	0	0	27	40th
2007	New Zealand V8s	Tony Richards Motorsport	21	0	0	0	1	508	11th
2008	New Zealand V8s	Tony Richards Motorsport	12	0	0	0	1	399	13th

=== Complete V8 Supercars results ===
(Races in bold indicate pole position) (Races in italics indicate fastest lap)

Supercars results
Year	Team	Car	1	2	3	4	5	6	7	8	9	10	11	12	13	14	15	16	17	18	19	20	21	22	23	24	25	26	27	28	29	30	31	32	33	34	35	36	37	Position	Points
1999	Greenfield Mowers Racing	Ford Falcon (EL)	EAS; R1; Ret	EAS; R2; 17	EAS; R3; 10	ADE; R4; 12	BAR; R5; 16	BAR; R6; 11	BAR; R7; 9	PHI; R8; 29	PHI; R9; Ret	PHI; R10; 13	HDV; R11; Ret	HDV; R12; 19	HDV; R13; 24	SAN; R14; 17	SAN; R15; 12	SAN; R16; 11	QLD; R17; Ret	QLD; R18; 25	QLD; R19; 15	CAL; R20; 17	CAL; R21; 13	CAL; R22; 11	SYM; R23; 9	SYM; R24; 13	SYM; R25; Ret	WIN; R26; 18	WIN; R27; 16	WIN; R28; 14	ORA; R29; 7	ORA; R30; 7	ORA; R31; 6	QLD; R32; Ret	BAT; R33; Ret					18th	721
2000	Greenfield Mowers Racing	Ford Falcon (AU)	PHI; R1; DNS	PHI; R2; 16	BAR; R3; 11	BAR; R4; Ret	BAR; R5; 18	ADE; R6; Ret	ADE; R7; 19	EAS; R8; 32	EAS; R9; 30	EAS; R10; Ret	HDV; R11; Ret	HDV; R12; 20	HDV; R13; Ret	CAN; R14; 23	CAN; R15; Ret	CAN; R16; 16	QLD; R17; Ret	QLD; R18; Ret	QLD; R19; 24	WIN; R20; 13	WIN; R21; 16	WIN; R22; 9	ORA; R23; Ret	ORA; R24; Wth	ORA; R25; Wth	CAL; R26; 17	CAL; R27; Ret	CAL; R28; 24	QLD; R29	SAN; R30	SAN; R31	SAN; R32	BAT; R33					20th	432
2000	Dick Johnson Racing	Ford Falcon (AU)	PHI; R1	PHI; R2	BAR; R3	BAR; R4	BAR; R5	ADE; R6	ADE; R7	EAS; R8	EAS; R9	EAS; R10	HDV; R11	HDV; R12	HDV; R13	CAN; R14	CAN; R15	CAN; R16	QLD; R17	QLD; R18	QLD; R19	WIN; R20	WIN; R21	WIN; R22	ORA; R23	ORA; R24	ORA; R25	CAL; R26	CAL; R27	CAL; R28	QLD; R29; 6	SAN; R30	SAN; R31	SAN; R32	BAT; R33; 4					20th	432
2001	Paragon Motorsport	Ford Falcon (AU)	PHI; R1; 14	PHI; R2; 16	ADE; R3; Ret	ADE; R4; Wth	EAS; R5; 9	EAS; R6; 9	HDV; R7; 11	HDV; R8; 12	HDV; R9; 10	CAN; R10; Ret	CAN; R11; Ret	CAN; R12; Wth	BAR; R13; 19	BAR; R14; 12	BAR; R15; 11	CAL; R16; 21	CAL; R17; 21	CAL; R18; Ret	ORA; R19; 23	ORA; R20; 24	QLD; R21	WIN; R22; 14	WIN; R23; 21	BAT; R24	PUK; R25	PUK; R26	PUK; R27	SAN; R28	SAN; R29	SAN; R30								25th	1128
2001	Dick Johnson Racing	Ford Falcon (AU)	PHI; R1	PHI; R2	ADE; R3	ADE; R4	EAS; R5	EAS; R6	HDV; R7	HDV; R8	HDV; R9	CAN; R10	CAN; R11	CAN; R12	BAR; R13	BAR; R14	BAR; R15	CAL; R16	CAL; R17	CAL; R18	ORA; R19	ORA; R20	QLD; R21	WIN; R22	WIN; R23	BAT; R24; 4	PUK; R25	PUK; R26	PUK; R27	SAN; R28	SAN; R29	SAN; R30								25th	1128
2002	Paragon Motorsport	Ford Falcon (AU)	ADE; R1; Ret	ADE; R2; 24	PHI; R3; DNQ	PHI; R4; DNQ	EAS; R5; 27	EAS; R6; Ret	EAS; R7; 22	HDV; R8; 29	HDV; R9; 24	HDV; R10; 19	CAN; R11; 29	CAN; R12; 22	CAN; R13; 19	BAR; R14; 21	BAR; R15; 9	BAR; R16; 12	ORA; R17; 26	ORA; R18; 26	WIN; R19; 15	WIN; R20; 19	QLD; R21; 15	BAT; R22; 8	SUR; R23; 19	SUR; R24; 14	PUK; R25; 22	PUK; R26; Ret	PUK; R27; 8	SAN; R28; Ret	SAN; R29; 21									25th	404
2003	John Kelly Racing	Holden Commodore (VX)	ADE; R1	ADE; R1	PHI; R3	EAS; R4	WIN; R5	BAR; R6	BAR; R7	BAR; R8	HDV; R9	HDV; R10	HDV; R11	QLD; R12	ORA; R13	SAN; R14; 12	BAT; R15; Ret	SUR; R16	SUR; R17	PUK; R18	PUK; R19	PUK; R20	EAS; R21	EAS; R22																47th	148
2004	Stone Brothers Racing	Ford Falcon (BA)	ADE; R1	ADE; R2	EAS; R3	PUK; R4	PUK; R5	PUK; R6	HDV; R7	HDV; R8	HDV; R9	BAR; R10	BAR; R11	BAR; R12	QLD; R13	WIN; R14	ORA; R15	ORA; R16	SAN; R17; 2	BAT; R18; 6	SUR; R19	SUR; R20	SYM; R21	SYM; R22	SYM; R23	EAS; R24	EAS; R25	EAS; R26												33rd	360
2005	Ford Performance Racing	Ford Falcon (BA)	ADE; R1	ADE; R2	PUK; R3	PUK; R4	PUK; R5	BAR; R6	BAR; R7	BAR; R8	EAS; R9	EAS; R10	SHA; R11	SHA; R12	SHA; R13	HDV; R14	HDV; R15	HDV; R16	QLD; R17	ORA; R18	ORA; R19	SAN; R20; 15	BAT; R21; 18	SUR; R22	SUR; R23	SUR; R24	SYM; R25	SYM; R26	SYM; R27	PHI; R28	PHI; R29	PHI; R30								56th	136
2006	Stone Brothers Racing	Ford Falcon (BA)	ADE; R1	ADE; R2	PUK; R3	PUK; R4	PUK; R5	BAR; R6	BAR; R7	BAR; R8	WIN; R9	WIN; R10	WIN; R11	HDV; R12	HDV; R13	HDV; R14	QLD; R15	QLD; R16	QLD; R17	ORA; R18	ORA; R19	ORA; R20	SAN; R21; 15	BAT; R22	SUR; R23	SUR; R24	SUR; R25	SYM; R26	SYM; R27	SYM; R28	BHR; R29	BHR; R30	BHR; R31	PHI; R32	PHI; R33	PHI; R34				48th	200
2006	Garry Rogers Motorsport	Holden Commodore (VZ)	ADE; R1	ADE; R2	PUK; R3	PUK; R4	PUK; R5	BAR; R6	BAR; R7	BAR; R8	WIN; R9	WIN; R10	WIN; R11	HDV; R12	HDV; R13	HDV; R14	QLD; R15	QLD; R16	QLD; R17	ORA; R18	ORA; R19	ORA; R20	SAN; R21	BAT; R22; 13	SUR; R23	SUR; R24	SUR; R25	SYM; R26	SYM; R27	SYM; R28	BHR; R29	BHR; R30	BHR; R31	PHI; R32	PHI; R33	PHI; R34				48th	200
2007	Garry Rogers Motorsport	Holden Commodore (VE)	ADE; R1	ADE; R2	BAR; R3	BAR; R4	BAR; R5	PUK; R6	PUK; R7	PUK; R8	WIN; R9	WIN; R10	WIN; R11	EAS; R12	EAS; R13	EAS; R14	HDV; R15	HDV; R16	HDV; R17	QLD; R18	QLD; R19	QLD; R20	ORA; R21	ORA; R22	ORA; R23	SAN; R24; 18	BAT; R25; 9	SUR; R26	SUR; R27	SUR; R28	BHR; R29	BHR; R30	BHR; R31	SYM; R32	SYM; R33	SYM; R34	PHI; R35	PHI; R36	PHI; R37	40th	27

=== Complete Bathurst 1000 results ===
Year	Team	Car	Co-driver	Position	Laps
1997*	Volvo Dealer Racing	Volvo 850	(Sweden) Jan Nilsson	5th	158
1998*	Greenfield Mowers Racing	BMW 320i	(Australia) Tony Scott	4th	159
1998	Garry Rogers Motorsport	Holden Commodore VS	(Australia) Garth Tander	DNF	49
1999	Greenfield Mowers Racing	Ford Falcon EL	(United Kingdom) John Cleland	DNF	138
2000	Dick Johnson Racing	Ford Falcon AU	(Australia) Steven Johnson	4th	161
2001	Dick Johnson Racing	Ford Falcon AU	(Australia) Greg Ritter	4th	161
2002	Paragon Motorsport	Ford Falcon AU	(Australia) Tony Scott	8th	161
2003	K-Mart Racing Team	Holden Commodore VX	(United Kingdom) Andy Priaulx	DNF	33
2004	Stone Brothers Racing	Ford Falcon BA	(Australia) Russell Ingall	6th	161
2005	Ford Performance Racing	Ford Falcon BA	(Australia) Greg Ritter	18th	138
2006	Garry Rogers Motorsport	Holden Commodore VZ	(Australia) Greg Ritter	13th	160
2007	Garry Rogers Motorsport	Holden Commodore VE	(Australia) Greg Ritter	9th	161

* Super Touring race
