= 1997 Australian Super Touring Championship =

1997 ASTC season

Seasons
- ← 1996 1998 →

== Season summary ==
The 1997 Australian Super Touring Championship was a CAMS sanctioned Australian motor racing title open to Super Touring Cars. It was the fifth national title to be run in Australia for Super Touring Cars and the third to carry the Australian Super Touring Championship name. The championship, which was promoted by TOCA Australia as the 1997 BOC Gases Australian Super Touring Championship, began on 4 May at Lakeside International Raceway and ended on 9 November at Amaroo Park after eight rounds and sixteen races. The Drivers Championship was won by Paul Morris, the Manufacturers Championship by BMW and the Teams Championship by BMW Motorsport.

== Teams and drivers ==
Team	Car	No	Drivers	Rounds	Class
Orix Audi Sport Australia	Audi A4 Quattro	1	(Australia) Brad Jones	All	M
Orix Audi Sport Australia	Audi A4 Quattro	11	(Australia) Cameron McConville	All	M
BMW Motorsport Australia	BMW 320i	2	(Australia) Paul Morris	All	M
BMW Motorsport Australia	BMW 320i	22	(New Zealand) Craig Baird	7-8	M
BMW Motorsport Australia	BMW 320i	83	(Australia) Geoff Brabham	All	M
Volvo Racing Australia	Volvo 850	4	(Australia) Tony Scott	8	M
Volvo Racing Australia	Volvo 850	8	(New Zealand) Jim Richards	All	M
Phoenix Motorsport	Toyota Camry	10	(Australia) Mark Adderton	3-4, 7-8	P
Phoenix Motorsport	Toyota Camry	10	(Australia) Neal Bates	5-6	P
Greenfield Mowers Racing	Opel Vectra; Holden Vectra	12	(Australia) Cameron McLean	All	P
CPW Motorsport	BMW 318iS	13	(Australia) Wayne Wakefield	1	P
CPW Motorsport	BMW 318iS	27	(Australia) Steven Johnson	7	P
CPW Motorsport	BMW 318iS	64	(New Zealand) Jason Richards	4	P
HVE Motorsport	Hyundai Lantra	14	(Australia) Jim Cornish	5-6	P
HVE Motorsport	Hyundai Lantra	14	(Australia) Kurt Kratzmann	7	P
HVE Motorsport	Hyundai Lantra	57	(Australia) Jim Cornish	1	P
HVE Motorsport	Hyundai Lantra	58	(Australia) Paul Pickett	1-2, 7-8	P
Team Petronas Touring Car	Ford Mondeo	15	(Italy) Gianfranco Brancatelli	2	P
Team Petronas Touring Car	Ford Mondeo	15	(South Africa) Michael Briggs	3	P
All Auto Parts	Toyota Carina	15	(Australia) Milton Leslight	8	P
Faber Castell Racing	BMW 318i	16	(Australia) Justin Matthews	All	P
MF Motorsport	Peugeot 405 Mi16	21	(Australia) Mike Fitzgerald	8	P
Garry Rogers Motorsport	Honda Accord	34	(New Zealand) Steven Richards	1	P
Garry Rogers Motorsport	Nissan Primera	34	(New Zealand) Steven Richards	2-6, 8	P
Fastway Couriers	Peugeot 405 Mi16	37	(New Zealand) Tony Newman	1-4, 7-8	P
Fastway Couriers	Peugeot 405 Mi16	38	(New Zealand) Dwayne Bewley	7-8	P
Fastway Couriers	Peugeot 405 Mi16	38	(New Zealand) Tony Newman	5-6	P
Gun Racing	Alfa Romeo 155 TS	45	(Australia) David Auger	All	P
John Henderson Racing	Opel Vectra	56	(Australia) John Henderson	8	P
FAI Insurance	Honda Accord	60	(Australia) Warren Luff	8	P
IBC Motorsport	Vauxhall Cavalier	79	(Australia) Bob Tweedie	All	P
Knight Racing	Ford Mondeo	88	(Australia) Peter Hills	4-5, 7-8	P
Knight Racing	Ford Mondeo	89	(Australia) Jenni Thompson	7	P
Knight Racing	Ford Mondeo	89	(Australia) Claude Elias	8	P
Nigel Barclay	BMW 318i	99	(New Zealand) Blair Smith	7-8	P

Icon	Class
M	Drivers eligible to score points in the Manufactures Trophy
P	Private Drivers

== Race calendar ==
The 1997 Australian Super Touring Championship was contested over eight rounds with two races held at each round.

Rd.	Race	Circuit	Location / state	Date	Winner	Car	Team	Report
NC	1	Albert Park Circuit	Melbourne, Victoria	8–9 March	Jim Richards	Volvo 850 GLT	Volvo Racing Australia	
NC	2	Albert Park Circuit	Melbourne, Victoria	8–9 March	Jim Richards	Volvo 850 GLT	Volvo Racing Australia	
NC	3	Albert Park Circuit	Melbourne, Victoria	8–9 March	Jim Richards	Volvo 850 GLT	Volvo Racing Australia	
1	1	Lakeside International Raceway	Brisbane, Queensland	3–4 May	Paul Morris	BMW 320i	Paul Morris Motorsport	
1	2	Lakeside International Raceway	Brisbane, Queensland	3–4 May	Paul Morris	BMW 320i	Paul Morris Motorsport	
2	1	Phillip Island Grand Prix Circuit	Phillip Island, Victoria	31 May–1 Jun	Paul Morris	BMW 320i	Paul Morris Motorsport	
2	2	Phillip Island Grand Prix Circuit	Phillip Island, Victoria	31 May–1 Jun	Geoff Brabham	BMW 320i	Paul Morris Motorsport	
3	1	Calder Park Raceway	Melbourne, Victoria	21–22 Jun	Brad Jones	Audi A4 Quattro	Brad Jones Racing	
3	2	Calder Park Raceway	Melbourne, Victoria	21–22 Jun	Geoff Brabham	BMW 320i	Paul Morris Motorsport	
4	1	Amaroo Park	Sydney, New South Wales	19–20 Jul	Brad Jones	Audi A4 Quattro	Brad Jones Racing	
4	2	Amaroo Park	Sydney, New South Wales	19–20 Jul	Brad Jones	Audi A4 Quattro	Brad Jones Racing	
5	1	Winton Motor Raceway	Benalla, Victoria	9–10 Aug	Cameron McConville	Audi A4 Quattro	Brad Jones Racing	
5	2	Winton Motor Raceway	Benalla, Victoria	9–10 Aug	Paul Morris	BMW 320i	Paul Morris Motorsport	
6	1	Mallala Motor Sport Park	Mallala, South Australia	23–24 Aug	Brad Jones	Audi A4 Quattro	Brad Jones Racing	
6	2	Mallala Motor Sport Park	Mallala, South Australia	23–24 Aug	Cameron McConville	Audi A4 Quattro	Brad Jones Racing	
NC	1	Mount Panorama Circuit	Bathurst, New South Wales	5 Oct	David Brabham & Geoff Brabham	BMW 320i	BMW Motorsport Australia	Report
7	1	Lakeside International Raceway	Brisbane, Queensland	25–26 Oct	Paul Morris	BMW 320i	Paul Morris Motorsport	
7	2	Lakeside International Raceway	Brisbane, Queensland	25–26 Oct	Paul Morris	BMW 320i	Paul Morris Motorsport	
8	1	Amaroo Park	Sydney, New South Wales	8–9 Nov	Geoff Brabham	BMW 320i	Paul Morris Motorsport	
8	2	Amaroo Park	Sydney, New South Wales	8–9 Nov	Paul Morris	BMW 320i	Paul Morris Motorsport	

== Championships Standings ==
Points system
1st	2nd	3rd	4th	5th	6th	7th	8th	9th	10th	Pole position
15	12	10	8	6	5	4	3	2	1	1

=== Drivers Championship ===
Pos.	Driver	Car	LAK		PHI		CAL		AMA		WIN		MAL		LAK		AMA		Points
1	Paul Morris	BMW 320i	1	1	1	2	Ret	2	2	4	2	1	6	3	1	1	4	1	191
2	Geoff Brabham	BMW 320i	2	2	5	1	2	1	4	3	8	3	Ret	2	2	2	1	3	171
3	Cameron McConville	Audi A4 Quattro	DSQ	8	2	4	3	3	3	2	1	2	3	1	4	6	3	2	155
4	Brad Jones	Audi A4 Quattro	Ret	6	11	3	1	4	1	1	3	6	1	4	Ret	7	2	Ret	126
5	Jim Richards	Volvo 850	3	3	Ret	5	4	5	5	5	4	4	2	5	5	4	6	5	111
6	Cameron McLean	Opel Vectra; Holden Vectra	4	4	4	Ret	5	10	11	6	5	7	4	6	6	5	13	11	67
7	Steven Richards	Honda Accord; Nissan Primera	Ret	Ret	3rd	6th	DSQ	6th	6th	7th	7th	5th	11th	Ret			8th	Ret	42
8	Craig Baird	BMW 320i													3	3	5	4	35
9	Justin Matthews	BMW 318i	5	8	6	8	9	9	10	11	10	9	Ret	Ret	9	9	16	8	31
10	Tony Newman	Peugeot 405 Mi16	8	9	7	7	8	Ret	Ret	10	11	Ret	7	8	Ret	14	Ret	DNS	23
11	David Auger	Alfa Romeo 155 TS	7	10	8	Ret	7	8	13	13	12	10	9	9	10	10	14	Ret	20
12	Bob Tweedie	Vauxhall Cavalier	Ret	Ret	12	DSQ	6	Ret	9	9	13	11	8	7	11	12	12	Ret	19
13	Mark Adderton	Toyota Camry					Ret	Ret	8	Ret					8	Ret	7	7	14
13	Neal Bates	Toyota Camry									6	8	5	Ret					14
15	Wayne Wakefield	BMW 318i	6	7															10
16	Tony Scott	Volvo 850															9	6	7
16	Jason Richards	BMW 318i							7	8									7
16	Steven Johnson	BMW 318i													7	8			7
19	Michael Briggs	Ford Mondeo					Ret	7											4
20	Jim Cornish	Hyundai Elantra	Ret	9	11	Ret					Ret	Ret	10	Ret					3
21	Peter Hills	Ford Mondeo							12	12	9	12			12	11	Ret	Ret	2
22	Claude Elias	Ford Mondeo															15	9	2
23	Dwayne Bewley	Peugeot 405 Mi16													Ret	13	10	10	2
24	Paul Pickett	Hyundai Elantra	Ret	Ret	10	Ret									Ret	15	Ret	DNS	1
-	Warren Luff	Honda Accord													Ret	DNS	11	Ret	-
-	Jenni Thompson	Ford Mondeo													13	16			-
-	Gianfranco Brancatelli	Ford Mondeo			Ret	Ret													-
-	Blair Smith	BMW 318i													Ret	Ret	Ret	Ret	-
-	Kurt Kratzmann	Hyundai Elantra													Ret	DNS			-
-	John Henderson	Opel Vectra															Ret	Ret	-
-	Milton Leslight	Toyota Carina															Ret	DNS	-
-	Mike Fitzgerald	Peugeot 405 Mi16															Ret	DNS	-
-	Albert Poon	Ford Mondeo			DNS	DNS													-
Pos.	Driver	Car	LAK		PHI		CAL		AMA		WIN		MAL		LAK		AMA		Points

Colour	Result
Gold	Winner
Silver	Second place
Bronze	Third place
Green	Points classification
Blue	Non-points classification
Blue	Non-classified finish (NC)
Purple	Retired, not classified (Ret)
Red	Did not qualify (DNQ)
Red	Did not pre-qualify (DNPQ)
Black	Disqualified (DSQ)
White	Did not start (DNS)
White	Withdrew (WD)
White	Race cancelled (C)
Blank	Did not practice (DNP)
Blank	Did not arrive (DNA)
Blank	Excluded (EX)

=== Manufacturers Championship ===
Manufacturers Championship points were awarded on a 15-12-10 basis for relative positions attained in each race by the best placed car of each of the three manufacturers that had nominated cars to compete on their behalf.

Position	Manufacturer	LAK		PHI		CAL		AMA		WIN		MAL		LAK		AMA		Points
1	(Germany) BMW	15	15	15	15	12	15	12	12	12	15	10	12	15	15	15	15	220
2	(Germany) Audi	-	10	12	12	15	12	15	15	15	12	15	15	12	10	12	12	194
3	(Sweden) Volvo	12	12	-	10	10	10	10	10	10	10	12	10	10	12	10	10	158

=== Teams' Trophy ===
Pos	Team	Car	Points
1	BMW Motorsport Australia	BMW 320i	362
2	Orix Audi Sport Australia	Audi A4	305
3	(Australia) HVE Motorsport	Hyundai Lantra	31
4	(Australia) Knight Racing	Ford Mondeo	30
5	(Australia) Volvo Dealer Team	Volvo 850	25
6	(Australia) Fastway Racing	Peugeot 405 Mi16	17

=== TOCA Challenge Cup - Independents ===
Position	Driver	Car	Points
1	Cameron McLean	Opel Vectra; Holden Vectra	186
2	Steven Richards	Nissan Primera	123
3	Justin Matthews	BMW 318i	111
4	David Auger	Alfa Romeo 155 TS	81
5	Robert Tweedie	Vauxhall Cavalier	78
6	Tony Newman	Peugeot 405 Mi16	74
7	Mark Adderton	Toyota Camry	50
8	Neal Bates	Toyota Camry	34
9	Peter Hills	Ford Mondeo	30
10	Wayne Wakefield	BMW 318i	24
=	Steven Johnson	BMW 318i	24
12	Jason Richards	BMW 318i	23
13	Dwayne Bewley	Peugeot 405 Mi16	22
14	Jim Cornish	Hyundai Lantra	16
15	Claude Elias	Ford Mondeo	13
16	Mike Briggs	Ford Mondeo	12
17	Warren Luff	Honda Accord	8
18	Paul Pickett	Hyundai Lantra	6
19	Jenni Thompson	Ford Mondeo	4

The TOCA Challenge Cup was open to drivers of teams which did not receive major support from a manufacturer.

== See also ==
1997 AMP Bathurst 1000, a non-championship race for Super Touring cars.
