= 1999 V8 Supercars Sandown round =

(Victoria (state)) 1999 Sandown V8 Supercar round
Event Information
- Round 6 of 13 in the 1999 Shell Championship Series
- Date: 25–27 June 1999
- Location: Melbourne, Victoria
- Venue: Sandown Raceway
- Weather: Fine

Results
Race 1
Distance	16 laps	50 km
Pole position	Craig Lowndes; Holden Racing Team	1:10.9386
Winner	Mark Skaife; Holden Racing Team	19:23.2600
Race 2
Distance	20 laps	62 km
Winner	Mark Skaife; Holden Racing Team	29:36.3204
Race 3
Distance	16 laps	50 km
Winner	Craig Lowndes; Holden Racing Team	19:19.4497
Round Results
First	Mark Skaife; Holden Racing Team	146 pts
Second	Craig Lowndes; Holden Racing Team	142 pts
Third	Paul Radisich; Dick Johnson Racing	128 pts

The 1999 Sandown V8 Supercar round was the sixth round of the 1999 Shell Championship Series. It was held on the weekend of 25 to 27 June at Sandown International Raceway in Melbourne, Victoria.

The Holden Racing Team dominated the round with Craig Lowndes claiming pole position and winning the third race while teammate Mark Skaife won the first and second races en route to claiming overall round honours ahead of Lowndes. Dick Johnson Racing's Paul Radisich rounded out the podium as the best performing Ford driver of the weekend.

== Background ==
The event was held on the weekend of 24 to 27 June 1999. It was the 28th ATCC/V8 Supercar event to be held at Sandown Raceway and consisted of three 50 km sprint races.

=== Entry list ===
A total of 39 drivers entered the weekend with a grid capacity of 36 cars.

== Race results ==
=== Qualifying ===
Pos	No	Name	Team	Vehicle	Time
1	1	(Australia) Craig Lowndes	Holden Racing Team	Holden Commodore (VT)	1:10.9386
2	2	(Australia) Mark Skaife	Holden Racing Team	Holden Commodore (VT)	1:11.0777
3	600	(Australia) John Bowe	PAE Motorsport	Ford Falcon (AU)	1:11.2325
4	5	(Australia) Glenn Seton	Glenn Seton Racing	Ford Falcon (AU)	1:11.2618
5	4	(Australia) Jason Bright	Stone Brothers Racing	Ford Falcon (AU)	1:11.4499
6	6	(Australia) Neil Crompton	Glenn Seton Racing	Ford Falcon (AU)	1:11.4831
7	25	(Australia) Tony Longhurst	Longhurst Racing	Ford Falcon (AU)	1:11.6070
8	8	(Australia) Russell Ingall	Perkins Engineering	Holden Commodore (VT)	1:11.6615
9	18	(New Zealand) Paul Radisich	Dick Johnson Racing	Ford Falcon (AU)	1:11.7456
10	10	(Australia) Mark Larkham	Larkham Motorsport	Ford Falcon (AU)	1:11.7508
11	7	(New Zealand) Steven Richards	Gibson Motorsport	Holden Commodore (VT)	1:11.7552
12	34	(Australia) Garth Tander	Garry Rogers Motorsport	Holden Commodore (VS)	1:11.7688
13	46	(New Zealand) John Faulkner	John Faulkner Racing	Holden Commodore (VT)	1:11.8119
14	17	(Australia) Dick Johnson	Dick Johnson Racing	Ford Falcon (AU)	1:11.8739
15	12	(New Zealand) Greg Murphy	Gibson Motorsport	Holden Commodore (VT)	1:11.9699
16	40	(Australia) Cameron McLean	Greenfield Mowers Racing	Ford Falcon (EL)	1:12.2295
17	35	(Australia) Jason Bargwanna	Garry Rogers Motorsport	Holden Commodore (VT)	1:12.2868
18	15	(Australia) Todd Kelly	Holden Young Lions	Holden Commodore (VS)	1:12.3772
19	11	(Australia) Larry Perkins	Perkins Engineering	Holden Commodore (VT)	1:12.4064
20	28	(Australia) Rodney Forbes	Bob Forbes Racing	Holden Commodore (VS)	1:12.4175
21	96	(Australia) Cameron McConville	John Faulkner Racing	Holden Commodore (VS)	1:12.6469
22	3	(Australia) Trevor Ashby	Lansvale Racing Team	Holden Commodore (VS)	1:12.7668
23	99	(Australia) Mark Noske	Holden Young Lions	Holden Commodore (VS)	1:12.8930
24	32	(Australia) Tomas Mezera	Tomas Mezera Motorsport	Holden Commodore (VT)	1:12.9054
25	16	(Australia) Dugal McDougall	McDougall Motorsport	Holden Commodore (VT)	1:12.9479
26	39	(Australia) Chris Smerdon	Challenge Motorsport	Holden Commodore (VS)	1:13.4596
27	73	(Australia) David Parsons	Challenge Recruitment	Holden Commodore (VS)	1:13.5311
28	43	(Australia) Paul Weel	Paul Weel Racing	Ford Falcon (AU)	1:13.6427
29	98	(Australia) Wayne Wakefield	Owen Parkinson Racing	Holden Commodore (VS)	1:13.8700
30	50	(Australia) Mick Donaher	Clive Wiseman Racing	Holden Commodore (VS)	1:13.9083
31	22	(Australia) Danny Osborne	Colourscan Motorsport	Ford Falcon (EL)	1:14.1306
32	75	(Australia) Anthony Tratt	Paul Little Racing	Ford Falcon (AU)	1:14.2566
33	33	(Australia) Allan McCarthy	Pro-Duct Motorsport	Holden Commodore (VS)	1:14.2822
34	70	(Australia) John Briggs	Briggs Motorsport	Ford Falcon (AU)	1:14.9814
35	79	(Australia) Mike Conway	Cadillac Productions	Ford Falcon (EL)	1:15.0969
36	26	(Australia) John Cotter	Doulman Automotive	Holden Commodore (VS)	1:15.3186
Did not qualify: Circuit capacity (36 cars)
37	77	(Australia) Richard Mork	V8 Racing	Holden Commodore (VR)	1:15.4707
38	14	(Australia) Mike Imrie	Imrie Motorsport	Holden Commodore (VS)	1:15.4957
39	52	(Australia) Barry Morcom	Barry Morcom Racing	Holden Commodore (VS)	1:15.8824

=== Privateers Cup ===
Pos.	No.	Name	Team	Vehicle	Laps	Time	Grid
1	40	(Australia) Cameron McLean	Greenfield Mowers Racing	Ford Falcon (EL)	12	14:42.7691	
2	28	(Australia) Rodney Forbes	Bob Forbes Racing	Holden Commodore (VS)	12		
3	73	(Australia) David Parsons	Gibson Motorsport	Holden Commodore (VS)	12		
4	50	(Australia) Mick Donaher	Clive Wiseman Racing	Holden Commodore (VS)	12		
5	39	(Australia) Chris Smerdon	Challenge Motorsport	Holden Commodore (VS)	12		
6	33	(Australia) Allan McCarthy	Pro-Duct Motorsport	Holden Commodore (VS)	12		
7	98	(Australia) Wayne Wakefield	Owen Parkinson Racing	Holden Commodore (VS)	12		
8	14	(Australia) Mike Imrie	Imrie Motorsport	Holden Commodore (VS)	12		
9	77	(Australia) Richard Mork	V8 Racing	Holden Commodore (VS)	12		
10	26	(Australia) John Cotter	M3 Motorsport	Holden Commodore (VS)	12		
11	79	(Australia) Mike Conway	Cadillac Productions	Ford Falcon (EL)	12		
12	52	(Australia) Barry Morcom	Barry Morcom Racing	Holden Commodore (VS)	12		
Ret	3	(Australia) Trevor Ashby	Lansvale Racing Team	Holden Commodore (VS)	9	Retired	
Fastest Lap: Cameron McLean (Greenfield Mowers Racing) - 1:12.4758 on lap 4

=== Race 1 ===
Pos.	No.	Name	Team	Vehicle	Laps	Time	Grid
1	2	(Australia) Mark Skaife	Holden Racing Team	Holden Commodore (VT)	16	19:23.2600	
2	1	(Australia) Craig Lowndes	Holden Racing Team	Holden Commodore (VT)	16		
3	600	(Australia) John Bowe	PAE Motorsport	Ford Falcon (AU)	16		
4	18	(New Zealand) Paul Radisich	Dick Johnson Racing	Ford Falcon (AU)	16		
5	4	(Australia) Jason Bright	Stone Brothers Racing	Ford Falcon (AU)	16		
6	5	(Australia) Glenn Seton	Glenn Seton Racing	Ford Falcon (AU)	16		
7	34	(Australia) Garth Tander	Garry Rogers Motorsport	Holden Commodore (VS)	16		
8	7	(New Zealand) Steven Richards	Gibson Motorsport	Holden Commodore (VT)	16		
9	25	(Australia) Tony Longhurst	Longhurst Racing	Ford Falcon (AU)	16		
10	35	(Australia) Jason Bargwanna	Garry Rogers Motorsport	Holden Commodore (VT)	16		
11	46	(New Zealand) John Faulkner	John Faulkner Racing	Holden Commodore (VT)	16		
12	17	(Australia) Dick Johnson	Dick Johnson Racing	Ford Falcon (AU)	16		
13	12	(New Zealand) Greg Murphy	Gibson Motorsport	Holden Commodore (VT)	16		
14	11	(Australia) Larry Perkins	Perkins Engineering	Holden Commodore (VT)	16		
15	10	(Australia) Mark Larkham	Larkham Motorsport	Ford Falcon (AU)	16		
16	16	(Australia) Dugal McDougall	McDougall Motorsport	Holden Commodore (VT)	16		
17	40	(Australia) Cameron McLean	Greenfield Mowers Racing	Ford Falcon (EL)	16		
18	8	(Australia) Russell Ingall	Perkins Engineering	Holden Commodore (VT)	16		
19	32	(Australia) Tomas Mezera	Tomas Mezera Motorsport	Holden Commodore (VT)	16		
20	3	(Australia) Trevor Ashby	Lansvale Racing Team	Holden Commodore (VS)	16		
21	43	(Australia) Paul Weel	Paul Weel Racing	Ford Falcon (AU)	16		
22	96	(Australia) Cameron McConville	John Faulkner Racing	Holden Commodore (VS)	16		
23	15	(Australia) Todd Kelly	Holden Young Lions	Holden Commodore (VS)	16		
24	73	(Australia) David Parsons	Gibson Motorsport	Holden Commodore (VS)	16		
25	75	(Australia) Anthony Tratt	Paul Little Racing	Ford Falcon (EL)	16		
26	28	(Australia) Rodney Forbes	Bob Forbes Racing	Holden Commodore (VS)	16		
27	98	(Australia) Wayne Wakefield	Owen Parkinson Racing	Holden Commodore (VS)	16		
28	39	(Australia) Chris Smerdon	Challenge Motorsport	Holden Commodore (VS)	16		
29	33	(Australia) Allan McCarthy	Pro-Duct Motorsport	Holden Commodore (VS)	16		
30	70	(Australia) John Briggs	Briggs Motorsport	Ford Falcon (AU)	16		
31	26	(Australia) John Cotter	M3 Motorsport	Holden Commodore (VS)	15	+ 1 lap	
32	79	(Australia) Mike Conway	Cadillac Productions	Ford Falcon (AU)	15	+ 1 lap	
33	50	(Australia) Mick Donaher	Clive Wiseman Racing	Holden Commodore (VS)	15	+ 1 lap	
Ret	22	(Australia) Danny Osborne	Peters Motorsport	Ford Falcon (EL)	11	Retired	
Ret	6	(Australia) Neil Crompton	Glenn Seton Racing	Ford Falcon (AU)	1	Retired	
Ret	99	(Australia) Mark Noske	Holden Young Lions	Holden Commodore (VS)	1	Retired	
Fastest Lap: Craig Lowndes (Holden Racing Team) - 1:11.8615 on lap 9

=== Race 2 ===
Pos.	No.	Name	Team	Vehicle	Laps	Time	Grid
1	2	(Australia) Mark Skaife	Holden Racing Team	Holden Commodore (VT)	20	29:36.3204	
2	1	(Australia) Craig Lowndes	Holden Racing Team	Holden Commodore (VT)	20		
3	18	(New Zealand) Paul Radisich	Dick Johnson Racing	Ford Falcon (AU)	20		
4	34	(Australia) Garth Tander	Garry Rogers Motorsport	Holden Commodore (VS)	20		
5	5	(Australia) Glenn Seton	Glenn Seton Racing	Ford Falcon (AU)	20		
6	4	(Australia) Jason Bright	Stone Brothers Racing	Ford Falcon (AU)	20		
7	12	(New Zealand) Greg Murphy	Gibson Motorsport	Holden Commodore (VT)	20		
8	46	(New Zealand) John Faulkner	John Faulkner Racing	Holden Commodore (VT)	20		
9	17	(Australia) Dick Johnson	Dick Johnson Racing	Ford Falcon (AU)	20		
10	11	(Australia) Larry Perkins	Perkins Engineering	Holden Commodore (VT)	20		
11	8	(Australia) Russell Ingall	Perkins Engineering	Holden Commodore (VT)	20		
12	40	(Australia) Cameron McLean	Greenfield Mowers Racing	Ford Falcon (EL)	20		
13	96	(Australia) Cameron McConville	John Faulkner Racing	Holden Commodore (VS)	20		
14	32	(Australia) Tomas Mezera	Tomas Mezera Motorsport	Holden Commodore (VT)	20		
15	10	(Australia) Mark Larkham	Larkham Motorsport	Ford Falcon (AU)	20		
16	25	(Australia) Tony Longhurst	Longhurst Racing	Ford Falcon (AU)	20		
17	35	(Australia) Jason Bargwanna	Garry Rogers Motorsport	Holden Commodore (VT)	20		
18	28	(Australia) Rodney Forbes	Bob Forbes Racing	Holden Commodore (VS)	20		
19	6	(Australia) Neil Crompton	Glenn Seton Racing	Ford Falcon (AU)	20		
20	16	(Australia) Dugal McDougall	McDougall Motorsport	Holden Commodore (VT)	20		
21	3	(Australia) Trevor Ashby	Lansvale Racing Team	Holden Commodore (VS)	20		
22	99	(Australia) Mark Noske	Holden Young Lions	Holden Commodore (VS)	20		
23	43	(Australia) Paul Weel	Paul Weel Racing	Ford Falcon (AU)	20		
24	15	(Australia) Todd Kelly	Holden Young Lions	Holden Commodore (VS)	20		
25	73	(Australia) David Parsons	Gibson Motorsport	Holden Commodore (VS)	20		
26	39	(Australia) Chris Smerdon	Challenge Motorsport	Holden Commodore (VS)	20		
27	50	(Australia) Mick Donaher	Clive Wiseman Racing	Holden Commodore (VS)	20		
28	70	(Australia) John Briggs	Briggs Motorsport	Ford Falcon (AU)	20		
29	79	(Australia) Mike Conway	Cadillac Productions	Ford Falcon (AU)	19	+ 1 lap	
30	77	(Australia) Richard Mork	V8 Racing	Holden Commodore (VR)	19	+ 1 lap	
31	26	(Australia) John Cotter	M3 Motorsport	Holden Commodore (VS)	18	+ 2 laps	
32	98	(Australia) Wayne Wakefield	Owen Parkinson Racing	Holden Commodore (VS)	17	+ 3 laps	
Ret	33	(Australia) Allan McCarthy	Pro-Duct Motorsport	Holden Commodore (VS)	15	Retired	
Ret	75	(Australia) Anthony Tratt	Paul Little Racing	Ford Falcon (AU)		Retired	
Ret	600	(Australia) John Bowe	PAE Motorsport	Ford Falcon (AU)		Retired	
Ret	7	(New Zealand) Steven Richards	Gibson Motorsport	Holden Commodore (VT)		Retired	
DNS	22	(Australia) Danny Osborne	Peters Motorsport	Ford Falcon (EL)		Did not start	
Fastest Lap: Glenn Seton (Glenn Seton Racing) - 1:11.7555 on lap 15

=== Race 3 ===
Pos.	No.	Name	Team	Vehicle	Laps	Time	Grid
1	1	(Australia) Craig Lowndes	Holden Racing Team	Holden Commodore (VT)	16	19:19.4497	
2	2	(Australia) Mark Skaife	Holden Racing Team	Holden Commodore (VT)	16		
3	34	(Australia) Garth Tander	Garry Rogers Motorsport	Holden Commodore (VS)	16		
4	18	(New Zealand) Paul Radisich	Dick Johnson Racing	Ford Falcon (AU)	16		
5	4	(Australia) Jason Bright	Stone Brothers Racing	Ford Falcon (AU)	16		
6	8	(Australia) Russell Ingall	Perkins Engineering	Holden Commodore (VT)	16		
7	5	(Australia) Glenn Seton	Glenn Seton Racing	Ford Falcon (AU)	16		
8	17	(Australia) Dick Johnson	Dick Johnson Racing	Ford Falcon (AU)	16		
9	11	(Australia) Larry Perkins	Perkins Engineering	Holden Commodore (VT)	16		
10	12	(New Zealand) Greg Murphy	Gibson Motorsport	Holden Commodore (VT)	16		
11	40	(Australia) Cameron McLean	Greenfield Mowers Racing	Ford Falcon (EL)	16		
12	25	(Australia) Tony Longhurst	Longhurst Racing	Ford Falcon (AU)	16		
13	96	(Australia) Cameron McConville	John Faulkner Racing	Holden Commodore (VS)	16		
14	10	(Australia) Mark Larkham	Larkham Motorsport	Ford Falcon (AU)	16		
15	6	(Australia) Neil Crompton	Glenn Seton Racing	Ford Falcon (AU)	16		
16	600	(Australia) John Bowe	PAE Motorsport	Ford Falcon (AU)	16		
17	99	(Australia) Mark Noske	Holden Young Lions	Holden Commodore (VS)	16		
18	32	(Australia) Tomas Mezera	Tomas Mezera Motorsport	Holden Commodore (VT)	16		
19	7	(New Zealand) Steven Richards	Gibson Motorsport	Holden Commodore (VT)	16		
20	28	(Australia) Rodney Forbes	Bob Forbes Racing	Holden Commodore (VS)	16		
21	43	(Australia) Paul Weel	Paul Weel Racing	Ford Falcon (AU)	16		
22	15	(Australia) Todd Kelly	Holden Young Lions	Holden Commodore (VS)	16		
23	73	(Australia) David Parsons	Gibson Motorsport	Holden Commodore (VS)	16		
24	3	(Australia) Trevor Ashby	Lansvale Racing Team	Holden Commodore (VS)	16		
25	50	(Australia) Mick Donaher	Clive Wiseman Racing	Holden Commodore (VS)	16		
26	39	(Australia) Chris Smerdon	Challenge Motorsport	Holden Commodore (VS)	16		
27	16	(Australia) Dugal McDougall	McDougall Motorsport	Holden Commodore (VT)	16		
28	70	(Australia) John Briggs	Briggs Motorsport	Ford Falcon (AU)	16		
29	14	(Australia) Mike Imrie	Imrie Motorsport	Holden Commodore (VS)	15	+ 1 lap	
30	98	(Australia) Wayne Wakefield	Owen Parkinson Racing	Holden Commodore (VS)	15	+ 1 lap	
31	79	(Australia) Mike Conway	Cadillac Productions	Ford Falcon (AU)	15	+ 1 lap	
32	26	(Australia) John Cotter	M3 Motorsport	Holden Commodore (VS)	15	+ 1 lap	
Ret	35	(Australia) Jason Bargwanna	Garry Rogers Motorsport	Holden Commodore (VT)	12	Retired	
Ret	33	(Australia) Allan McCarthy	Pro-Duct Motorsport	Holden Commodore (VS)	9	Retired	
Ret	46	(New Zealand) John Faulkner	John Faulkner Racing	Holden Commodore (VT)	3	Retired	
DNS	22	(Australia) Danny Osborne	Peters Motorsport	Ford Falcon (EL)		Did not start	
DNS	75	(Australia) Anthony Tratt	Paul Little Racing	Ford Falcon (EL)		Did not start	
Fastest Lap: Craig Lowndes (Holden Racing Team) - 1:11.6535 on lap 8
