= 1998 AMP Bathurst 1000 =

Motor race

Seasons
- ← 1997 1999 →

Layout of the Mount Panorama Circuit

The 1998 AMP Bathurst 1000 was the 40th running of the Bathurst 1000 touring car race. It was held on 4 October 1998 at the Mount Panorama Circuit just outside Bathurst. It was the second year of the controversial split between race organisers, the Australian Racing Drivers Club, and V8 Supercar, which had led to Australia's leading touring car series leaving the Bathurst 1000. The V8 Supercar teams raced the 1998 FAI 1000 race, held six weeks later. The race distance was 161 laps, approximately 1000 km.

== Class structure ==
The 1998 AMP Bathurst 1000 was an endurance race for Super Touring Cars, New Zealand Touring Cars and Production Cars.

=== ST ===
The class featured International Group 2 Touring Cars, otherwise known as Supertouring. It featured teams from Australia, New Zealand and Great Britain fielding a total of 28 cars. Featured cars were: Alfa Romeo 155, Audi A4, BMW 318i, BMW 320i, Ford Mondeo, Holden Vectra, Honda Accord, Hyundai Lantra, Nissan Primera, Peugeot 405, Peugeot 406, Toyota Carina, Vauxhall Cavalier, Vauxhall Vectra and Volvo S40.

=== NZ ===
The New Zealand touring car series, Schedule S, was invited and the ten car entry featured: BMW 320i, BMW 325i, Ford Telstar, Honda Integra, Nissan Sentra, Peugeot 405, Suzuki Baleno, Toyota Corolla and Toyota Corona.

=== 3E ===
Production cars, conforming to an older version of the Australian Production Car Championship regulations were also invited with five cars arriving. They cars were: Honda Civic, Mazda 626 and Toyota Camry.

== Top ten run-off ==
Post-qualifying shootout results as follows:

Pos	No	Team	Driver	Car	Time
1	40	Volvo S40 Racing	(Sweden) Rickard Rydell	Volvo S40	2:14.9265
2	34	Team Dynamics	(New Zealand) Steven Richards	Nissan Primera	2:16.4143
3	4	Volvo S40 Racing	(United Kingdom) Tim Harvey	Volvo S40	2:16.4672
4	80	Team Vectra	(New Zealand) Greg Murphy	Holden Vectra	2:16.7782
5	8	Team Vectra	(United Kingdom) Derek Warwick	Vauxhall Vectra	2:17.3103
6	2	Audi Sport Australia	(Australia) Paul Morris	Audi A4 Quattro	2:18.2657
7	1	Audi Sport Australia	(Australia) Brad Jones	Audi A4 Quattro	2:18.3658
8	29	Brookes Motorsport	(United Kingdom) Lee Brookes	Honda Accord	2:18.9932
9	12	Greenfield Mowers Racing	(Australia) Cameron McLean	BMW 320i	2:19.1715
10	88	Knight Racing	(Australia) Peter Hills	Ford Mondeo	2:22.9436

== Official results ==
Race results as follows:

Pos	Class	No	Team	Drivers	Car	Laps	Time/Retired	Grid
1	ST	40	Volvo S40 Racing	(Sweden) Rickard Rydell (New Zealand) Jim Richards	Volvo S40	161	6:54:23.4756	1
2	ST	34	Team Dynamics	(New Zealand) Steven Richards (United Kingdom) Matt Neal	Nissan Primera	161	+1.9975	2
3	ST	1	Audi Sport Australia	(Australia) Brad Jones (Australia) Cameron McConville	Audi A4 Quattro	161	+25.7516	7
4	ST	12	Greenfield Mowers Racing	(Australia) Cameron McLean (Australia) Tony Scott	BMW 320i	159	+2 laps	9
5	ST	8	Team Vectra	(United Kingdom) Derek Warwick (United Kingdom) John Cleland	Vauxhall Vectra	157	+4 laps	5
6	ST	88	Knight Racing	(Australia) Peter Hills (Australia) Domenic Beninca	Ford Mondeo	155	+6 laps	10
7	ST	30	Roadchill Express	(Australia) Troy Searle (Australia) Luke Searle	BMW 320i	152	+9 laps	12
8	ST	22	Rod Wilson Racing	(Australia) Rodney Forbes (Australia) Rod Wilson	BMW 318i	152	+9 laps	15
9	ST	16	Faber-Castell Racing	(Australia) Justin Mathews (Australia) Bob Holden (Australia) Paul Nelson	BMW 318i	145	+16 laps	16
10	NZ	64	International Motorsport	(New Zealand) Kevin Bell (New Zealand) Rod Hicks	BMW 320i	144	+17 laps	28
11	ST	20	Brian Bradshaw Race Preparation	(New Zealand) Dennis Chapman (New Zealand) Brian Bradshaw	BMW 318i	144	+17 laps	22
12	NZ	65	International Motorsport	(New Zealand) Aaron Harris (New Zealand) Miles Worsley	BMW 325i	141	+20 laps	33
13	ST	45	Gun Motorsport	(Australia) David Auger (New Zealand) Lawrie Kyte	Alfa Romeo 155	137	+24 laps	17
14	3E	35	Tom Watkinson	(Australia) Tom Watkinson (Australia) Calvin Gardiner	Mazda 626	136	+25 laps	36
15	3E	71	Rebound Clothing Co.	(Australia) Phil Kirkham (Australia) Matt Lehmann	Mazda 626	135	+26 laps	34
16	NZ	67	Geoff Short	(New Zealand) Geoff Short (New Zealand) Greg Goudie	Ford Telstar	131	+30 laps	32
17	3E	37	Ken Talbert	(Australia) Ken Talbert (Australia) Carlos Rolfo	Mazda 626	130	+31 laps	40
18	ST	25	Rodney Jones Racing	(United Kingdom) Mike Newton (Australia) Jamie Miller	Vauxhall Cavalier	128	+33 laps	30
DNF	ST	14	Racing Projects	(New Zealand) Blair Smith (Australia) Jim Cornish	Nissan Primera	139	Crash damage	13
DNF	NZ	63	International Motorsport	(New Zealand) Jason Richards (New Zealand) Barrie Thomlinson	BMW 320i	128	Engine	24
NC	NZ	68	Wayne Johnson	(New Zealand) Wayne Johnson (New Zealand) Maurice O'Reilly	Honda Integra	120	Not Classified	37
NC	ST	49	Grid Motorsport	(Australia) Anthony Robson (Australia) Ric Shaw	BMW 318i	112	Not Classified	21
DNF	NZ	70	Air Vanuatu / Bartercard	(New Zealand) Ted Jarvis (New Zealand) Tony Rutherford	Toyota Corolla	111	Engine	42
NC	ST	11	All Auto Parts	(Australia) Milton Leslight (Australia) Dennis Cribbin	Toyota Carina	110	Not Classified	27
NC	ST	58	HVE Motorsport	(Australia) Paul Pickett (Australia) Peter Rushton (Australia) Nigel Stones	Hyundai Lantra	107	Not Classified	19
DNF	ST	2	Audi Sport Australia	(Australia) Paul Morris (New Zealand) Paul Radisich	Audi A4 Quattro	84	Crash damage	6
DNF	ST	80	Team Vectra	(New Zealand) Greg Murphy (Australia) Russell Ingall	Holden Vectra	83	Crash	4
DNF	ST	4	Volvo S40 Racing	(United Kingdom) Tim Harvey (Sweden) Jan Nilsson	Volvo S40	82	Crash	3
DNF	ST	98	Knight Racing	(Australia) Paula Elstrek (Australia) Damien Digby (Australia) Heidi O'Neill	Ford Mondeo	78	Spun Off	25
DNF	ST	77	Motorsport Developments	(Australia) Malcolm Rea (Australia) Wayne Wakefield	Toyota Carina	76	Crash	23
DNF	ST	24	Bruce Miles	(New Zealand) Bruce Miles (New Zealand) Murray Cleland	BMW 318i	63	Gearbox	20
DNF	3E	38	Phoenix Motorsport	(Australia) David Ratcliff (Australia) Ron Searle	Toyota Camry	59	Electrical	35
DNF	NZ	61	Prestige Motorsports Management	(New Zealand) Peter Van Breugel (New Zealand) Ian Spurle (New Zealand) Mike Eady	Nissan Sentra SSS	56	Crash	26
DNF	ST	10	TC Motorsport	(New Zealand) Tony Newman (Australia) Mark Williamson	Peugeot 406	52	Engine	11
DNF	ST	29	Brookes Motorsport	(United Kingdom) Robb Gravett (United Kingdom) Lee Brookes	Honda Accord	49	Oil Sump	8
DNF	NZ	90	Robert Ker	(New Zealand) Bernie Gillon (New Zealand) Paul Pedersen	Toyota Corona	47	Engine/Driveshaft	31
DNF	NZ	62	BT Motorsport	(New Zealand) Bill Tunzelmann (New Zealand) Malcolm Udy	Peugeot 405	47	Steering	41
DNF	3E	33	Burwood Motorsport	(Australia) Allan Letcher (Australia) Adam Macrow (Australia) Cameron Edwards	Honda Civic	34	Suspension	38
DNF	ST	18	Aaron McGill	(Australia) Aaron McGill (Australia) Clayton Haynes	Peugeot 405	24	Suspension	18
DNF	ST	60	Knight Racing	(Australia) Warren Luff (Australia) Mark Zonneveld	Ford Mondeo	18	Engine	14
DNF	ST	23	MF Motorsport	(Australia) Mike Fitzgerald (Australia) Jenni Thompson	Peugeot 405	17	Suspension	29
DNF	ST	15	Racing Projects	(United Kingdom) Jamie Wall (Australia) Mark Adderton	Honda Accord	14	Steering	43
DNS	NZ	66	Suzuki Value Finance	(New Zealand) Max Pennington (New Zealand) Grant Aitken (New Zealand) Chris Bird	Suzuki Baleno		Crash in Qualifying	39

== Statistics ==
- Provisional Pole Position – #80 Greg Murphy
- Pole Position – #40 Rickard Rydell – 2:14.9265
- Fastest Lap – #40 Rickard Rydell – 2:17.9558 – Lap 153
- Average Speed – N/A
- Race Time – 6:54:23.4756
