= 1996 Australian Super Touring Championship =

1996 ASTC season

Seasons
- ← 1995 1997 →

The 1996 Australian Super Touring Championship was an Australian motor racing competition for Super Touring Cars. It was contested over eight rounds, commencing on 19 May 1996 at Amaroo Park and ending on 9 November at Oran Park Raceway. The championship was organised by TOCA Australia and was sanctioned by the Confederation of Australian Motor Sport. It was the fourth running of a touring car series in Australia under Super Touring Car regulations. BOC was the naming rights sponsor. It was televised by Network 10.

The Drivers Championship was won by Brad Jones driving an Audi 80 Quattro. The Teams Championship was awarded to Brad Jones Racing and the Manufacturers Championship to Audi. The TOCA Challenge Independents Cup was won by Steven Richards driving both a Garry Rogers Motorsport Honda Accord and Alfa Romeo 155.

== Teams and drivers ==
The following teams and drivers contested the championship:

| Team | Manufacturer | Car model | No | Driver |
|---|---|---|---|---|
| Paul Morris Motorsport | BMW | 318i | 1 | (Australia) Paul Morris |
| Paul Morris Motorsport | BMW | 318i | 10 | (Australia) Charlie O'Brien |
| Paul Morris Motorsport | BMW | 318i | 83 | (Australia) Geoff Brabham |
| Brad Jones Racing | Audi | A4 Quattro | 3 | (Australia) Brad Jones |
| Brad Jones Racing | Audi | A4 Quattro | 4 | (New Zealand) Greg Murphy |
| Volvo Dealer Racing | Volvo | 850 | 05 | (Australia) Peter Brock |
| Jim Richards Motorsport | Holden | Vectra | 11 | (New Zealand) Jim Richards |
| Greenfield Mowers Racing | BMW | 318i | 12 | (Australia) Cameron McLean |
| Bob Holden Motors | BMW | M3 | 13 | (Australia) Bob Holden |
| Bob Holden Motors | BMW | M3 | 15 | (Australia) Paul Nelson |
| Bob Holden Motors | BMW | 318i | 16 | (Australia) Justin Mathews |
| Graham Hutchison | BMW | M3 | 18 | (Australia) Graham Hutchison |
| Ross Palmer Motorsport | Ford | Mondeo | 22 | (United States) Kevin Schwantz |
| Sentul Motorsport Team | Opel | Vectra | 25 | (Australia) Brooke Tatnell |
| Triple P Racing | BMW | 318iS | 28 | (Australia) Paul Sarlas |
| Triple P Racing | BMW | 318iS | 56 | (Australia) John Henderson |
| Triple P Racing | Hyundai | Lantra | 58 | (Australia) Paul Pickett |
| Triple P Racing | Hyundai | Lantra | 59 | (Australia) Lars Johansson |
| Craig Lawless | Peugeot | 405 Mi16 | 31 | (Australia) Peter Roggenkamp |
| Kurt Kratzmann | Ford | Sierra | 33 | (Australia) Kurt Kratzmann |
| Garry Rogers Motorsport | Honda; Alfa Romeo | Accord; 155 TS | 34 | (New Zealand) Steven Richards |
| International Racing | BMW | 318i | 36 | (New Zealand) Miles Pope (Australia) Bob Tweedie |
| Knight Racing | Ford | Sierra | 88 | (Australia) Peter Hills |
| Phoenix Motorsport | Holden | Vectra | 95 | (Australia) Russell Ingall |
| Phoenix Motorsport | Peugeot | 405 Mi16 | 95 | (Australia) Geoff Full |
| Phoenix Motorsport | Peugeot | 405 Mi16 | 96 | (Australia) Mark Adderton |

- Note : Car 11 was entered as a Vauxhall Cavalier for the Mallala round.
- Note : Car 25 was entered as a Holden Vectra for the Mallala round.

== Race calendar ==
The championship was contested over eight rounds with two races per round.

| Round | | Race title | Circuit | Location / state | Date | Winner | Team | Car |
|---|---|---|---|---|---|---|---|---|
| NC | 1 | (Australia) Australian Grand Prix support | Albert Park Circuit | Melbourne, Victoria | 9–10 March | (Australia) Geoff Brabham | Paul Morris Motorsport | BMW 318i |
| NC | 2 | (Australia) Australian Grand Prix support | Albert Park Circuit | Melbourne, Victoria | 9–10 March | (Australia) Geoff Brabham | Paul Morris Motorsport | BMW 318i |
| NC | 1 | (Australia) Gold Coast Indy support | Surfers Paradise Street Circuit | Gold Coast, Queensland | 30–31 March | (Australia) Brad Jones | Brad Jones Racing | Audi 80 Quattro |
| NC | 2 | (Australia) Gold Coast Indy support | Surfers Paradise Street Circuit | Gold Coast, Queensland | 30–31 March | (Australia) Greg Murphy | Brad Jones Racing | Audi 80 Quattro |
| 1 | 1 | (Australia) Amaroo Park | Amaroo Park | Sydney, New South Wales | 18–19 May | (Australia) Brad Jones | Brad Jones Racing | Audi 80 Quattro |
| 1 | 2 | (Australia) Amaroo Park | Amaroo Park | Sydney, New South Wales | 18–19 May | (Australia) Brad Jones | Brad Jones Racing | Audi 80 Quattro |
| 2 | 1 | (Australia) Lakeside | Lakeside International Raceway | Brisbane, Queensland | 22–23 Jun | (Australia) Paul Morris | Paul Morris Motorsport | BMW 318i |
| 2 | 2 | (Australia) Lakeside | Lakeside International Raceway | Brisbane, Queensland | 22–23 Jun | (Australia) Brad Jones | Brad Jones Racing | Audi 80 Quattro |
| 3 | 1 | (Australia) Amaroo Park | Amaroo Park | Sydney, New South Wales | 13–14 Jul | (Australia) Brad Jones | Brad Jones Racing | Audi 80 Quattro |
| 3 | 2 | (Australia) Amaroo Park | Amaroo Park | Sydney, New South Wales | 13–14 Jul | (Australia) Brad Jones | Brad Jones Racing | Audi 80 Quattro |
| 4 | 1 | (Australia) Mallala | Mallala Motor Sport Park | Mallala, South Australia | 10–11 Aug | (New Zealand) Greg Murphy | Brad Jones Racing | Audi 80 Quattro |
| 4 | 2 | (Australia) Mallala | Mallala Motor Sport Park | Mallala, South Australia | 10–11 Aug | (Australia) Brad Jones | Brad Jones Racing | Audi 80 Quattro |
| 5 | 1 | (Australia) Winton | Winton Motor Raceway | Benalla, Victoria | 24–25 Aug | (Australia) Geoff Brabham | Paul Morris Motorsport | BMW 318i |
| 5 | 2 | (Australia) Winton | Winton Motor Raceway | Benalla, Victoria | 24–25 Aug | (New Zealand) Steven Richards | Garry Rogers Motorsport | Honda Accord |
| 6 | 1 | (Australia) Phillip Island | Phillip Island Grand Prix Circuit | Phillip Island, Victoria | 21–22 Sep | (Australia) Brad Jones | Brad Jones Racing | Audi 80 Quattro |
| 6 | 2 | (Australia) Phillip Island | Phillip Island Grand Prix Circuit | Phillip Island, Victoria | 21–22 Sep | (New Zealand) Greg Murphy | Brad Jones Racing | Audi 80 Quattro |
| NC | 1 | (Australia) Bathurst 1000 support | Mount Panorama Circuit | Bathurst, New South Wales | 5–6 Oct | (New Zealand) Craig Baird | Paul Morris Motorsport | BMW 318i |
| NC | 2 | (Australia) Bathurst 1000 support | Mount Panorama Circuit | Bathurst, New South Wales | 5–6 Oct | (New Zealand) Craig Baird | Paul Morris Motorsport | BMW 318i |
| NC | 3 | (Australia) Bathurst 1000 support | Mount Panorama Circuit | Bathurst, New South Wales | 5–6 Oct | (New Zealand) Jim Richards | Volvo Dealer Racing | Volvo 850 |
| 7 | 1 | (Australia) Lakeside | Lakeside International Raceway | Brisbane, Queensland | 26–27 Oct | (Australia) Paul Morris | Paul Morris Motorsport | BMW 318i |
| 7 | 2 | (Australia) Lakeside | Lakeside International Raceway | Brisbane, Queensland | 26–27 Oct | (Australia) Paul Morris | Paul Morris Motorsport | BMW 318i |
| 8 | 1 | (Australia) Oran Park | Oran Park Raceway | Sydney, New South Wales | 8–9 Nov | (Australia) Brad Jones | Brad Jones Racing | Audi 80 Quattro |
| 8 | 2 | (Australia) Oran Park | Oran Park Raceway | Sydney, New South Wales | 8–9 Nov | (Australia) Brad Jones | Brad Jones Racing | Audi 80 Quattro |

Note: NC indicates a non-championship event at which no championship points were on offer.

== Championships standings ==
=== Drivers Championship ===
Points system
| 1st | 2nd | 3rd | 4th | 5th | 6th | 7th | 8th | 9th | 10th | Pole position |
| 15 | 12 | 10 | 8 | 6 | 5 | 4 | 3 | 2 | 1 | 1 |

An additional point was awarded to the fastest qualifier for each race.

| Pos. | Driver | Car | Amaroo Park (Australia) | | Lakeside (Australia) | | Amaroo Park (Australia) | | Mallala (Australia) | | Winton (Australia) | | Phillip Island (Australia) | | Lakeside (Australia) | | Oran Park (Australia) | | Points |
|---|---|---|---|---|---|---|---|---|---|---|---|---|---|---|---|---|---|---|---|
| 1 | Brad Jones | Audi 80 Quattro | 1st | 1st | Ret | 1st | 1st | 1st | 3rd | 1st | 4th | 3rd | 1st | Ret | 3rd | 9th | 1st | 1st | 181 |
| 2 | Paul Morris | BMW 318i | 3rd | 3rd | 1st | 3rd | 2nd | 3rd | 5th | 4th | 2nd | 2nd | 3rd | 9th | 1st | 1st | 2nd | 4th | 170 |
| 3 | Greg Murphy | Audi 80 Quattro | 2nd | 2nd | 2nd | 2nd | 5th | 2nd | 1st | 2nd | Ret | DSQ | 2nd | 1st | 7th | 7th | 12th | 3rd | 141 |
| 4 | Geoff Brabham | BMW 318i | 4th | 4th | Ret | 4th | 3rd | 4th | 4th | 3rd | 1st | 5th | 5th | 5th | 2nd | Ret | Ret | 5th | 114 |
| 5 | Steven Richards | Honda Accord; Alfa Romeo 155 | 5th | 5th | Ret | DNS | 8th | 8th | 2nd | Ret | 9th | 1st | 6th | 3rd | 9th | 5th | 4th | 10th | 79 |
| 6 | Peter Brock | Volvo 850 | 6th | Ret | Ret | 6th | 4th | Ret | Ret | 5th | 7th | Ret | 8th | 4th | 5th | 2nd | 3rd | 7th | 71 |
| 7 | Charlie O'Brien | BMW 318i | 7th | 7th | Ret | 5th | 6th | 5th | 6th | 6th | Ret | 6th | 4th | 2nd | 8th | 6th | | | 68 |
| 8 | Jim Richards | Vauxhall Cavalier; Holden Vectra | | | | | | | Ret | 7th | 3rd | Ret | 7th | 6th | 4th | 3rd | 5th | 2nd | 60 |
| 9 | Cameron McLean | BMW 318i | Ret | 6th | Ret | 7th | 7th | 6th | Ret | 8th | 8th | 7th | DSQ | 8th | 10th | Ret | 7th | 8th | 39 |
| 10 | Mark Adderton | Peugeot 405 | 8th | Ret | | | 9th | 7th | Ret | 9th | 6th | 4th | 9th | Ret | Ret | DNS | | | 29 |
| 11 | Justin Mathews | BMW 318i BMW M3 | 9th | 8th | 3rd | 9th | 12th | Ret | 9th | 13th | 10th | 8th | 10th | 10th | Ret | DNS | 10th | 11th | 26 |
| 12 | Russell Ingall | Holden Vectra | | | | | | | | | | | | | 6th | 4th | Ret | 6th | 18 |
| 13 | Geoff Full | Peugeot 405 | Ret | Ret | Ret | DNS | 10th | DNS | 7th | Ret | 5th | Ret | Ret | 7th | | | | | 15 |
| 14 | Miles Pope | BMW 318i | | | 4th | 8th | 11th | 10th | Ret | 10th | | | | | | | | | 13 |
| 15 | Kevin Schwantz | Ford Mondeo | | | | | | | | | | | | | | | 6th | 9th | 7 |
| 15 | Bob Tweedie | BMW 318i | | | | | | | | | 12th | 9th | 11th | 11th | 11th | 8th | 9th | 12th | 7 |
| 17 | Kurt Kratzmann | Ford Sierra | | | 5th | 14th | | | | | | | | | 12th | Ret | | | 6 |
| 18 | John Henderson | BMW 318i | | | 6th | 11th | 13th | 11th | | | | | | | | | | | 5 |
| 18 | Bob Holden | BMW M3 | 11th | 9th | 8th | 12th | | | Ret | Ret | Ret | Ret | 13th | 13th | | | | | 5 |
| 18 | Graham Hutchison | BMW M3 | | | 7th | 10th | | | | | | | | | | | | | 5 |
| 21 | Peter Hills | Ford Sierra | 13th | 10th | 9th | 13th | 14th | 12th | 10th | 14th | 14th | 11th | Ret | DNS | | | | | 4 |
| 22 | Paul Pickett | Hyundai Lantra | 10th | Ret | | | Ret | 9th | 11th | 12th | 11th | Ret | 12th | 12th | | | 11th | 13th | 3 |
| 22 | Brooke Tatnell | Holden Vectra | | | | | | | 8th | 11th | Ret | DNS | | | | | | | 3 |
| 24 | Lars Johansson | Hyundai Lantra | | | | | | | | | 13th | 10th | | | | | | | 1 |
| Pos. | Driver | Car | Amaroo Park (Australia) | | Lakeside (Australia) | | Amaroo Park (Australia) | | Mallala (Australia) | | Winton (Australia) | | Phillip Island (Australia) | | Lakeside (Australia) | | Oran Park (Australia) | | Points |

| Colour | Result |
|---|---|
| Gold | Winner |
| Silver | Second place |
| Bronze | Third place |
| Green | Points classification |
| Blue | Non-points classification |
| Blue | Non-classified finish (NC) |
| Purple | Retired, not classified (Ret) |
| Red | Did not qualify (DNQ) |
| Red | Did not pre-qualify (DNPQ) |
| Black | Disqualified (DSQ) |
| White | Did not start (DNS) |
| White | Withdrew (WD) |
| White | Race cancelled (C) |
| Blank | Did not practice (DNP) |
| Blank | Did not arrive (DNA) |
| Blank | Excluded (EX) |

=== Manufacturers Championship ===
Points system
| 1st | 2nd | 3rd | 4th | 5th | 6th | 7th | 8th | 9th | 10th |
| 15 | 12 | 10 | 8 | 6 | 5 | 4 | 3 | 2 | 1 |

Points were awarded basis for relative placings achieved in each race by manufacturer supported entries. All cars other than the best placed supported entry of each manufacturer were ignored when awarding points.

| Pos. | Driver | Amaroo Park (Australia) | | Lakeside (Australia) | | Amaroo Park (Australia) | | Mallala (Australia) | | Winton (Australia) | | Phillip Island (Australia) | | Lakeside (Australia) | | Oran Park (Australia) | | Points | |
|---|---|---|---|---|---|---|---|---|---|---|---|---|---|---|---|---|---|---|---|
| 1 | (Germany) Audi | Audi A4 Quattro | 15 | 15 | 12 | 15 | 15 | 15 | 15 | 15 | 12 | 12 | 15 | 15 | 12 | 10 | 15 | 15 | 223 |
| 2 | (Germany) BMW | BMW 318i | 12 | 12 | 15 | 12 | 12 | 12 | 12 | 12 | 15 | 15 | 12 | 12 | 15 | 15 | 12 | 12 | 207 |
| 3 | (Sweden) Volvo | Volvo 850 | 10 | – | – | 10 | 10 | – | – | 10 | 10 | – | 10 | 10 | 10 | 12 | 10 | 10 | 112 |

=== Teams Championship ===
Points system
| 1st | 2nd | 3rd | 4th | 5th | 6th | 7th | 8th | 9th | 10th |
| 15 | 12 | 10 | 8 | 6 | 5 | 4 | 3 | 2 | 1 |

Points were awarded basis for placings achieved in each race. Only the best two placed cars from each team were eligible to score points.

| Position | Team | Car | Points |
| 1 | Brad Jones Racing | Audi A4 Quattro | 339 |
| 2 | Paul Morris Motorsport | BMW 318i | 323 |
| 3 | Phoenix Motorsport | Peugeot 405 & Holden Vectra | 113 |
| 4 | Bob Holden Motors | BMW 318i & BMW M3 | 108 |

=== TOCA Challenge Independents Cup ===
Points were awarded on a 15–12–10–8–6–5–4–3–2–1 basis for relative positions achieved by drivers of entries nominated as privateers at each race.

| Position | Driver | No. | Car | Entrant | Points |
| 1 | Steven Richards | 34 | Honda Accord, Alfa Romeo 155 | Garry Rogers Motorsport | 159 |
| 2 | Cameron McLean | 12 | BMW 318i | Greenfield Mowers Racing | 121 |
| 3 | Jim Richards | 11 | Vauxhall Cavalier, Holden Vectra | Jim Richards | 111 |
| 4 | Justin Matthews | 16 | BMW 318i & BMW M3 | Bob Holden Motors | 94 |
| 5 | Mark Adderton | 96 | Peugeot 405 | Phoenix Motorsport | 80 |
| 6 | Miles Pope | 36 | BMW 318i | Miles Pope | 44 |
| 7 | Paul Pickett | 58 | Hyundai Lantra | Triple P Racing | 43 |
| = | Robert Tweedie | 36 | BMW 318i | Intercity Business Centre | 43 |
| 9 | Geoff Full | 95 | Peugeot 405 | Phoenix Motorsport | 42 |
| 10 | Peter Hills | 88 | Ford Sierra | Knight Racing | 37 |
| 11 | Russell Ingall | 95 | Holden Vectra | Phoenix Motorsport | 36 |
| 12 | Bob Holden | 13 | BMW M3 | Bob Holden Motors | 28 |
| 13 | John Henderson | 56 | BMW 318i | Miles Pope Racing | 23 |
| 14 | Kurt Kratzmann | 33 | Ford Sierra | Kurt Kratzmann | 18 |
| = | Kevin Schwantz | 22 | Ford Mondeo | Positive Hype | 18 |
| 16 | Brooke Tatnell | 25 | Holden Vectra | Sentul Motorsport Team | 16 |
| 17 | Graham Hutchison | 18 | BMW M3 | Stephen Voight | 14 |
| 18 | Lars Johansson | 59 | Hyundai Lantra | Triple P Racing | 7 |
| 19 | Paul Sarlas | 28 | BMW 318is | Triple P Racing | 4 |
| 20 | Peter Roggenkamp | 31 | Peugeot 405 Mi16 | Craig Lawless | 2 |

== See also ==
1996 Australian Touring Car season
