= 1995 Australian Sports Sedan Championship =

Motor racing competition

The 1995 Australian Sports Sedan Championship was a CAMS sanctioned Australian motor racing title for Group 2D Sports Sedans. The title, which was the 11th Australian Sports Sedan Championship, was won by Cameron McLean driving a Greenfield Mowers Racing BMW M3.

== Calendar ==
The championship was contested over a four round series.

Round	Circuit	State	Date	Winning driver	Car
1	Sandown	Victoria	9 April	Cameron McLean	BMW M3
2	Sandown	Victoria	9 April	Cameron McLean	BMW M3
3	Oran Park	New South Wales	6 August	Barry Jameson	Ford EF Falcon-Chevrolet
4	Oran Park	New South Wales	6 August	Barry Jameson	Ford EF Falcon-Chevrolet

== Championship results ==
Position	Driver	Car	Points
1	Cameron McLean	BMW M3	60
2	Barry Jameson	Ford EF Falcon-Chevrolet	53
3	James Phillip	Honda Prelude-Chevrolet	40
4	Peter O’Brien	Ford Sierra-Buick V6	?

Note: Only the top four championship positions are shown in the above table.
