= 1997 AMP Bathurst 1000 =

Motor race

Seasons
- ← 1996 1998 →

Layout of the Mount Panorama Circuit

The 1997 AMP Bathurst 1000 was the 38th running of the annual Bathurst 1000 touring car race. It was held on 5 October 1997 at the Mount Panorama Circuit just outside Bathurst in New South Wales, Australia. It was the first Bathurst 1000 race held after the controversial split between race organisers, the Australian Racing Drivers Club, and V8 Supercar, which led to Australia's leading touring car category contesting a separate 1000 kilometre race at Bathurst. That race, the 1997 Primus 1000 Classic, was held two weeks after the AMP Bathurst 1000.

The 1997 AMP Bathurst 1000 was open to Super Touring Cars and featured teams from Australia, New Zealand and Great Britain. It could thus be considered as the first "international" Bathurst endurance race since the 1992 Tooheys 1000, which was the last Bathurst 1000 to be contested by cars complying with Australian regulations based on FIA Group A rules.

The race was won by brothers Geoff Brabham and David Brabham, driving a BMW 320i for BMW Motorsport Australia. The car of teammates Paul Morris and Craig Baird had initially been declared the winner of the race but was later disqualified as Baird had breached the race regulation which limited any one driver to a maximum of three hours continuous driving; they were placed 27th & last. A late race error saw the BMW Motorsport Australia team leave Baird in the car at the final pit stop instead of putting Morris in the car for the run to the chequered flag. This mistake cost the team a 1–2 finish for BMW. It was the second time in Geoff Brabham's career that he had won a major endurance race with his brother as a co-driver. The middle of the three Brabham brothers Gary, was one of Geoff's co-drivers when he won the IMSA 1991 Coca-Cola 12 Hours of Sebring.

== Top Ten Run-off ==
The fastest ten cars from qualifying contested a one lap "Top Ten Run-off" on the Saturday to determine the first ten grid places for the race.

Pos	No	Team	Driver	Car	Time
Pole	2	BMW Motorsport Australia	(Australia) Paul Morris	BMW 320i	2:16.5958
2	3	Williams Renault Dealer Racing	(Switzerland) Alain Menu	Renault Laguna	2:16.6158
3	6	Esso Ultron Team Peugeot	(United Kingdom) Tim Harvey	Peugeot 406	2:17.1536
4	05	Vauxhall Sport	(United Kingdom) Derek Warwick	Vauxhall Vectra	2:17.2754
5	26	Esso Ultron Team Peugeot	(United Kingdom) Patrick Watts	Peugeot 406	2:17.5628
6	83	BMW Motorsport Australia	(Australia) Geoff Brabham	BMW 320i	2:17.5857
7	34	Garry Rogers Valvoline Cummins	(New Zealand) Steven Richards	Nissan Primera	2:17.9726
8	1	ORIX Audi Sport Australia	(Australia) Brad Jones	Audi A4 Quattro	2:18.8756
9	7	Vauxhall Sport	(United Kingdom) John Cleland	Vauxhall Vectra	2:19.5864
10	23	Williams Renault Dealer Racing	(Australia) Alan Jones	Renault Laguna	2:20.5274

* 1997 was the first time in which a car Peter Brock was entered in was driven in the runoff by his co-driver. In this case it was Vauxhall Sport team owner and former Formula One driver Derek Warwick who was in the drivers seat. Brock had in fact rolled the #05 Vauxhall Vectra coming into Caltex Chase during qualifying.
* Derek Warwick became the 6th ex-Formula One driver to appear in the runoff following Jack Brabham, Derek Bell, Larry Perkins, Alan Jones and David Brabham.
* Paul Morris' pole time of 2:16.5958 was 5.5798 seconds slower than Glenn Seton's 1996 pole time of 2:11.0160 set in a V8 powered Ford EF Falcon showing the difference in speed between the Australian 5.0 litre V8 formula and the 2.0 litre Super Touring cars.
* Eight of the ten drivers were making their first appearance in the Bathurst Top 10 shootout. Only Brad Jones and Alan Jones (no relation) had appeared previously. Alain Menu, Tim Harvey, Derek Warwick and Patrick Watts, all British Touring Car Championship regulars, were Bathurst rookies.
* Geoff Brabham became the first third member of a family to appear in the Top 10 runoff following his father Jack (1978) and his 1997 co-driver, his younger brother David (1993). As of the 2015 race, this is the last time the name Brabham has appeared in the runoff.
* Appearing in his first Top 10 runoff, Steven Richards, the son of then 5 time Great Race winner Jim Richards, joined David and Geoff Brabham and Steven Johnson (the son of 3 time winner Dick Johnson) as second generation drivers whose fathers had also appeared in the runoff.

== Official results ==
Pos	No	Team	Drivers	Car	Laps	Time/Retired	Grid
1	83	BMW Motorsport Australia	(Australia) Geoff Brabham (Australia) David Brabham	BMW 320i	161	6:41:25.4072	6
2	1	ORIX Audi Sport Australia	(Australia) Brad Jones (Germany) Frank Biela	Audi A4 Quattro	161	+12.1517	8
3	11	ORIX Audi Sport Australia	(Australia) Cameron McConville (Belgium) Jean-François Hemroulle	Audi A4 Quattro	161	+1:11.2559	11
4	4	Volvo Dealer Racing	(New Zealand) Jim Richards (Sweden) Rickard Rydell	Volvo 850	159	+2 laps	13
5	8	Volvo Dealer Racing	(Sweden) Jan Nilsson (Australia) Cameron McLean	Volvo 850	158	+3 laps	12
6	05	Vauxhall Sport	(Australia) Peter Brock (United Kingdom) Derek Warwick	Vauxhall Vectra	148	+13 laps	4
7	16	Faber-Castell Racing	(Australia) Paul Nelson (Australia) Justin Mathews (Australia) Bob Holden	BMW 318i	146	+15 laps	20
8	20	Brian Bradshaw Race Preparation	(New Zealand) Dennis Chapman (New Zealand) Brian Bradshaw	BMW 318i	144	+17 laps	25
9	21	MF Motorsport	(Australia) Mike Fitzgerald (Australia) Jamie Miller	Peugeot 405 Mi16	139	+22 laps	26
10	60	FAI Insurance	(United Kingdom) Julian Bailey (Australia) Warren Luff	Honda Accord	138	+23 laps	14
11	45	Gun Motorsport	(Australia) David Auger (New Zealand) Lawrie Kyte	Alfa Romeo 155	134	+27 laps	24
DNF	64	CPW Motorsport	(New Zealand) Jason Richards (New Zealand) Brett Riley	BMW 318i	125	Engine	17
DNF	37	Fastway Couriers	(New Zealand) Tony Newman (New Zealand) Dwayne Bewley	Peugeot 405 Mi16	121	Oil Pressure	15
DNF	30	Roadchill Express	(Australia) Troy Searle (Australia) Geoff Full	BMW 320i	115	Engine	18
DNF	3	Williams Renault Dealer Racing	(Switzerland) Alain Menu (United Kingdom) Jason Plato	Renault Laguna	114	Diff	2
DNF	26	Esso Ultron Team Peugeot	(United Kingdom) Patrick Watts (Australia) Neil Crompton	Peugeot 406	112	Oil Pressure	5
DNF	14	HVE Motorsport	(Australia) Ric Shaw (Australia) Anthony Robson	Hyundai Lantra	110	Throttle Cable	23
DNF	34	Garry Rogers Motorsport	(New Zealand) Steven Richards (United Kingdom) Matt Neal	Nissan Primera	84	Brakes	7
NC	88	Knight Racing	(Australia) Peter Hills (Australia) Andrej Pavicevic	Ford Mondeo	80	Not Classified	21
DNF	58	HVE Motorsport	(Australia) Paul Pickett (Australia) Bill Sieders	Hyundai Lantra	73	Suspension	27
DNF	6	Esso Ultron Team Peugeot	(United Kingdom) Tim Harvey (New Zealand) Paul Radisich	Peugeot 406	70	Suspension	3
DNF	10	Phoenix Motorsport	(Australia) Neal Bates (Australia) Mark Adderton	Toyota Camry	64	Gearbox	16
DNF	23	Williams Renault Dealer Racing	(Australia) Alan Jones (Australia) Graham Moore	Renault Laguna	38	Crash	10
DNF	12	Nigel Barclay	(New Zealand) Nigel Barclay (New Zealand) Blair Smith (Australia) Jim Cornish	BMW 318i	37	Engine	19
DNF	7	Vauxhall Sport	(United Kingdom) John Cleland (United Kingdom) James Kaye	Vauxhall Vectra	32	Power Steering	9
DSQ	2	BMW Motorsport Australia	(Australia) Paul Morris (New Zealand) Craig Baird	BMW 320i	161	Disqualified (Driver stint breach)	1
DSQ	89	Knight Racing	(Australia) Jenni Thompson (Australia) Aaron McGill (Australia) Terry Skene	Ford Mondeo	56	Disqualified (Driving in wrong direction)	22
DNQ	15	All Auto Parts	(Australia) Milton Leslight (Australia) Dennis Cribbin	Toyota Carina			
DNS	22	BMW Motorsport Australia	(Australia) Geoff Brabham	BMW 320i			
DNS	38	Fastway Couriers	(New Zealand) Dwayne Bewley (New Zealand) Tony Newman	Peugeot 405 Mi16			

=== Statistics ===
- Provisional Pole Position – #83 Geoff Brabham – 2:17.4276
- Pole Position – #2 Paul Morris – 2:16.5958
- Fastest Lap – #3 Jason Plato – 2:16.8034 – Lap 5 (Super Touring lap record)
- Average Speed – 150 km/h
- Race Time – 6:41:25.4072
