= 2001 V8 Supercars Darwin round =

2001 Supercar Championship event

(Northern Territory) 2001 Hidden Valley V8 Supercar round
Event Information
- Round 4 of 14 in the 2001 Shell Championship Series
- Date: 11–13 May 2001
- Location: Darwin, Northern Territory
- Venue: Hidden Valley Raceway
- Weather: Fine

Results
Race 1
Distance	17 laps	50 km
Pole position	Mark Skaife; Holden Racing Team	1:08.4552
Winner	Russell Ingall; Perkins Engineering	19:59.3998
Race 2
Distance	35 laps	100 km
Winner	Greg Murphy; Kmart Racing Team	41:38.1129
Race 3
Distance	35 laps	100 km
Winner	Mark Skaife; Holden Racing Team	54:26.3310
Round Results
First	Marcos Ambrose; Stone Brothers Racing	232 pts
Second	Jason Bright; Holden Racing Team	222 pts
Third	Mark Skaife; Holden Racing Team	218 pts

The 2001 Hidden Valley V8 Supercar round was the fourth round of the 2001 Shell Championship Series. It was held on the weekend of 12 to 13 May at Hidden Valley Raceway in Darwin, Northern Territory.

In a weekend where key contenders faced varying levels of difficulty, Marcos Ambrose took his first round victory through a string of consistent results across the three races. Russell Ingall was the winner of the first race and was on course to win the second, however suffered a tail-shaft issue, ruling him out of contention. Greg Murphy won race two but a sticking throttle curtailed his efforts for race three. Mark Skaife's weekend begun with a penalty over a false start but fought back from the rear to claim victory in race three.

== Background ==
The event was held on the weekend of 12–13 May 2001. It was the fourth V8 Supercar event to be held at Hidden Valley Raceway, and consisted of one 50 km race followed by two 100 km races. Pitstops were compulsory for races two and three.

Jason Bright entered the weekend as the championship leader by 50 points over Holden Racing Team teammate Mark Skaife. Bright also held the lap record which he set back in 1999. Heat was a major talking point heading into the weekend with track temperatures reaching, and exceeding, 40 degrees Celsius.

This would be the last round in which drivers would have to manually control their speed through the pitlane. At the following round in Canberra, electronic pit-speed limiters would be introduced on all the cars.

=== Entry list ===
The only driver changes for this round were by way of Steve Reed replacing Trevor Ashby in the second of the Lansvale Racing Team cars, and Christian D'Agostin would make his season debut at Imrie Motorsport. John Faulkner would switch from the VT Commodore to the VX Commodore while Paul Romano would switch from the VX to the VT.

== Race report ==
=== Pre-Qualifying ===
Pos	No	Name	Team	Vehicle	Time
1	3	(Australia) Cameron McConville	Lansvale Racing Team	Holden Commodore (VX)	1:09.9179
2	7	(Australia) Rodney Forbes	Gibson Motorsport	Ford Falcon (AU)	1:10.4450
3	9	(Australia) David Besnard	Stone Brothers Racing	Ford Falcon (AU)	1:10.4979
4	24	(Australia) Paul Romano	Romano Racing	Holden Commodore (VT)	1:10.7975
5	021	(New Zealand) Jason Richards	Team Kiwi Racing	Holden Commodore (VT)	1:11.0146
6	50	(Australia) Tyler Mecklem	Clive Wiseman Racing	Holden Commodore (VT)	1:11.6473
DNPQ	45	(Australia) Dean Canto	RPM International Racing	Ford Falcon (AU)	1:11.6789
DNPQ	76	(Australia) Matthew White	Matthew White Racing	Holden Commodore (VS)	1:12.0787
DNPQ	14	(Australia) Christian D'Agostin	Imrie Motorsport	Holden Commodore (VX)	1:12.4062

=== Qualifying ===
Garth Tander claimed provisional pole position in a welcome change of form after the Garry Rogers Motorsport team had struggled in the opening few rounds of the championship.

Pos	No	Name	Team	Vehicle	Time
1	34	(Australia) Garth Tander	Garry Rogers Motorsport	Holden Commodore (VX)	1:08.4938
2	4	(Australia) Marcos Ambrose	Stone Brothers Racing	Ford Falcon (AU)	1:08.5566
3	600	(Australia) John Bowe	Briggs Motorsport	Ford Falcon (AU)	1:08.6059
4	8	(Australia) Russell Ingall	Perkins Engineering	Holden Commodore (VX)	1:08.6654
5	51	(New Zealand) Greg Murphy	Tom Walkinshaw Racing Australia	Holden Commodore (VX)	1:08.6672
6	5	(Australia) Glenn Seton	Glenn Seton Racing	Ford Falcon (AU)	1:08.6746
7	1	(Australia) Mark Skaife	Holden Racing Team	Holden Commodore (VX)	1:08.6848
8	11	(Australia) Larry Perkins	Perkins Engineering	Holden Commodore (VX)	1:08.7111
9	9	(Australia) David Besnard	Stone Brothers Racing	Ford Falcon (AU)	1:08.7181
10	10	(Australia) Mark Larkham	Larkham Motor Sport	Ford Falcon (AU)	1:08.7438
11	00	(Australia) Craig Lowndes	Gibson Motorsport	Ford Falcon (AU)	1:08.7495
12	2	(Australia) Jason Bright	Holden Racing Team	Holden Commodore (VX)	1:08.7717
13	31	(Australia) Steven Ellery	Steven Ellery Racing	Ford Falcon (AU)	1:08.8297
14	6	(New Zealand) Steven Richards	Glenn Seton Racing	Ford Falcon (AU)	1:08.9097
15	15	(Australia) Todd Kelly	Tom Walkinshaw Racing Australia	Holden Commodore (VX)	1:09.0418
16	18	(New Zealand) Paul Radisich	Dick Johnson Racing	Ford Falcon (AU)	1:09.0729
17	35	(Australia) Jason Bargwanna	Garry Rogers Motorsport	Holden Commodore (VX)	1:09.1017
18	17	(Australia) Steven Johnson	Dick Johnson Racing	Ford Falcon (AU)	1:09.1579
19	29	(Australia) Paul Morris	Paul Morris Motorsport	Holden Commodore (VT)	1:09.2620
20	40	(Australia) Cameron McLean	Paragon Motorsport	Ford Falcon (AU)	1:09.3129
21	43	(Australia) Paul Weel	Paul Weel Racing	Ford Falcon (AU)	1:09.3375
22	16	(Australia) Dugal McDougall	McDougall Motorsport	Holden Commodore (VX)	1:09.4241
23	75	(Australia) Anthony Tratt	Paul Little Racing	Ford Falcon (AU)	1:09.5466
24	3	(Australia) Cameron McConville	Lansvale Racing Team	Holden Commodore (VX)	1:09.6948
25	021	(New Zealand) Jason Richards	Team Kiwi Racing	Holden Commodore (VT)	1:09.7491
26	46	(New Zealand) John Faulkner	John Faulkner Racing	Holden Commodore (VX)	1:09.7688
27	7	(Australia) Rodney Forbes	Gibson Motorsport	Ford Falcon (AU)	1:09.7981
28	54	(Australia) Tony Longhurst	Rod Nash Racing	Holden Commodore (VX)	1:10.0401
29	24	(Australia) Paul Romano	Romano Racing	Holden Commodore (VT)	1:10.1156
30	50	(Australia) Tyler Mecklem	Clive Wiseman Racing	Holden Commodore (VT)	1:10.1678
31	23	(Australia) Steve Reed	Lansvale Racing Team	Holden Commodore (VS)	1:10.5598

=== Top Ten Shootout ===
Pos	No	Name	Team	Vehicle	Time
1	1	(Australia) Mark Skaife	Holden Racing Team	Holden Commodore (VX)	1:08.4552
2	8	(Australia) Russell Ingall	Perkins Engineering	Holden Commodore (VX)	1:08.6116
3	4	(Australia) Marcos Ambrose	Stone Brothers Racing	Ford Falcon (AU)	1:08.6298
4	51	(New Zealand) Greg Murphy	Tom Walkinshaw Racing Australia	Holden Commodore (VX)	1:08.7780
5	5	(Australia) Glenn Seton	Glenn Seton Racing	Ford Falcon (AU)	1:08.8086
6	600	(Australia) John Bowe	Briggs Motor Sport	Ford Falcon (AU)	1:08.8598
7	34	(Australia) Garth Tander	Garry Rogers Motorsport	Holden Commodore (VX)	1:09.0763
8	10	(Australia) Mark Larkham	Larkham Motor Sport	Ford Falcon (AU)	1:09.0978
9	11	(Australia) Larry Perkins	Perkins Engineering	Holden Commodore (VX)	1:09.2454
10	9	(Australia) David Besnard	Stone Brothers Racing	Ford Falcon (AU)	1:09.3068

=== Race 1 ===
Skaife received a stop-go penalty for a jump start, thus handing the race lead to Russell Ingall. A bottleneck effect into turn one saw Glenn Seton, John Bowe and Ambrose collide with one another. Seton, who was on the furthermost inside of the course, was sent across the front of Ambrose's car, who then collided with Bowe, who then in turn collided with Tander. The resulting damage forced Tander to retire while Seton and Bowe sustained significant damage while losing substantial track position. Ambrose emerged relatively unscathed from the incident.

Whilst in pursuit of Ingall, Greg Murphy slid off the road at turn four after an apparent throttle issue, relinquishing positions to Ambrose and Mark Larkham. John Faulkner and Rodney Forbes would also fall victim to the corner as well as the tyres began to degrade. A couple laps later, Craig Lowndes spun Larry Perkins at the same corner, for which he would receive a stop-go penalty.

Ingall meanwhile enjoyed a trouble-free run to the chequered flag, taking his first win of the season. After the race, Ingall expressed confidence in his cars' setup ahead of the rest of the weekend. Ambrose finished in second place and Mark Larkham secured third in what would be the last podium of his V8 Supercar career.

Pos	No	Driver	Team	Car	Laps	Time	Grid
1	8	(Australia) Russell Ingall	Perkins Engineering	Holden Commodore (VX)	17	19min 59.3998sec	2
2	4	(Australia) Marcos Ambrose	Stone Brothers Racing	Ford Falcon (AU)	17	+ 1.52	3
3	10	(Australia) Mark Larkham	Larkham Motorsport	Ford Falcon (AU)	17	+ 5.05	8
4	51	(New Zealand) Greg Murphy	Tom Walkinshaw Racing Australia	Holden Commodore (VX)	17	+ 6.31	4
5	2	(Australia) Jason Bright	Holden Racing Team	Holden Commodore (VX)	17	+ 9.16	12
6	18	(New Zealand) Paul Radisich	Dick Johnson Racing	Ford Falcon (AU)	17	+ 10.45	16
7	9	(Australia) David Besnard	Stone Brothers Racing	Ford Falcon (AU)	17	+ 13.67	10
8	31	(Australia) Steven Ellery	Steven Ellery Racing	Ford Falcon (AU)	17	+ 14.02	13
9	6	(New Zealand) Steven Richards	Glenn Seton Racing	Ford Falcon (AU)	17	+ 14.41	14
10	29	(Australia) Paul Morris	Paul Morris Motorsport	Holden Commodore (VT)	17	+ 18.38	19
11	40	(Australia) Cameron McLean	Paragon Motorsport	Ford Falcon (AU)	17	+ 18.72	20
12	11	(Australia) Larry Perkins	Perkins Engineering	Holden Commodore (VX)	17	+ 21.97	9
13	35	(Australia) Jason Bargwanna	Garry Rogers Motorsport	Holden Commodore (VX)	17	+ 22.66	17
14	1	(Australia) Mark Skaife	Holden Racing Team	Holden Commodore (VX)	17	+ 22.94	1
15	43	(Australia) Paul Weel	Paul Weel Racing	Ford Falcon (AU)	17	+ 24.27	21
16	16	(Australia) Dugal McDougall	McDougall Motorsport	Holden Commodore (VX)	17	+ 24.76	22
17	3	(Australia) Cameron McConville	Lansvale Racing Team	Holden Commodore (VX)	17	+ 26.27	24
18	15	(Australia) Todd Kelly	Tom Walkinshaw Racing Australia	Holden Commodore (VX)	17	+ 29.48	15
19	54	(Australia) Tony Longhurst	Rod Nash Racing	Holden Commodore (VX)	17	+ 34.94	28
20	00	(Australia) Craig Lowndes	Gibson Motorsport	Ford Falcon (AU)	17	+ 35.86	11
21	17	(Australia) Steven Johnson	Dick Johnson Racing	Ford Falcon (AU)	17	+ 42.09	18
22	23	(Australia) Steve Reed	Lansvale Racing Team	Holden Commodore (VS)	17	+ 42.11	31
23	24	(Australia) Paul Romano	Romano Racing	Holden Commodore (VT)	17	+ 42.81	29
24	021	(New Zealand) Jason Richards	Team Kiwi Racing	Holden Commodore (VT)	17	+ 45.43	25
25	7	(Australia) Rodney Forbes	Gibson Motorsport	Ford Falcon (AU)	17	+ 53.10	27
26	46	(New Zealand) John Faulkner	John Faulkner Racing	Holden Commodore (VX)	17	+ 1:02.15	26
27	5	(Australia) Glenn Seton	Glenn Seton Racing	Ford Falcon (AU)	16	+ 1 lap	5
28	21	(Australia) Brad Jones	Brad Jones Racing	Ford Falcon (AU)	16	+ 1 lap	32
29	600	(Australia) John Bowe	Briggs Motor Sport	Ford Falcon (AU)	16	+ 1 lap	6
Ret	75	(Australia) Anthony Tratt	Paul Little Racing	Ford Falcon (AU)	2	Retired	23
Ret	34	(Australia) Garth Tander	Garry Rogers Motorsport	Holden Commodore (VX)	0	Collision damage	7
DNS	50	(Australia) Tyler Mecklem	Clive Wiseman Racing	Holden Commodore (VT)		Did not start	
Fastest Lap: Mark Skaife (Holden Racing Team) - 1:09.4899 on lap 8

=== Race 2 ===
Paul Radisich failed to make the start after his car experienced fuel system issues that ultimately eradicated the engine. With Dick Johnson Racing having already gone through their allocation for the weekend, this rendered Radisich out of contention for the third race as well.

Things went from bad to worse for Dick Johnson Racing after the Steven Johnson was involved in an opening lap crash with Dugal McDougall which ripped the front spoiler off the Falcon and sent McDougall to the back of the grid. John Bowe meanwhile retired from the race owing to a faulty clutch. On lap 10, Lowndes and Cameron McLean made contact on the front straight which skewed the front-left of the car. The damage immobilised Lowndes' car and his race came to an end at the pitlane entry.

Skaife attempted to reclaim ground lost in race one by staying out later than most for his compulsory pitstop, finally pitting on lap 15. This paid dividends as he would emerged fourth in the pecking order behind Ingall and Murphy. Tander meanwhile was penalised for pit equipment crossing over into the fastlane, drawing ire from team owner Garry Rogers over the inconsistency among stewarding decisions. Larkham would also be pinged for a pit procedure violation. John Faulkner would be involved in two incidents in the third sector - the first being a spin due to brake balance issues, and the second as a result of contact with Steve Reed. Paul Morris retired on lap 28 owing to a mechanical issue.

With a handful of laps remaining, Murphy began to catch Ingall for the lead. With six laps remaining, the gap had closed to within one second. With three laps remaining, stewards would issue Ingall a bad sportsmanship flag for blocking. With two laps to go, Ingall strayed wide at turn one, allowing Murphy to take the lead. Soon after, it became apparent Ingall's car was suffering an issue, later revealed to be a tail-shaft failure. He limped around for the remaining two laps to eventually finish in 22nd place. Murphy coaxed his Commodore to the line to take victory over the two Holden Racing Team entries of Bright and Skaife.

Pos	No	Driver	Team	Car	Laps	Time	Grid
1	51	(New Zealand) Greg Murphy	Tom Walkinshaw Racing Australia	Holden Commodore (VX)	35	41min 38.1129sec	4
2	2	(Australia) Jason Bright	Holden Racing Team	Holden Commodore (VX)	35	+ 2.64	5
3	1	(Australia) Mark Skaife	Holden Racing Team	Holden Commodore (VX)	35	+ 3.03	14
4	4	(Australia) Marcos Ambrose	Stone Brothers Racing	Ford Falcon (AU)	35	+ 3.56	2
5	9	(Australia) David Besnard	Stone Brothers Racing	Ford Falcon (AU)	35	+ 15.86	7
6	6	(New Zealand) Steven Richards	Glenn Seton Racing	Ford Falcon (AU)	35	+ 16.33	9
7	35	(Australia) Jason Bargwanna	Garry Rogers Motorsport	Holden Commodore (VX)	35	+ 30.93	13
8	15	(Australia) Todd Kelly	Tom Walkinshaw Racing Australia	Holden Commodore (VX)	35	+ 31.52	18
9	11	(Australia) Larry Perkins	Perkins Engineering	Holden Commodore (VX)	35	+ 32.70	12
10	5	(Australia) Glenn Seton	Glenn Seton Racing	Ford Falcon (AU)	35	+ 33.01	27
11	21	(Australia) Brad Jones	Brad Jones Racing	Ford Falcon (AU)	35	+ 33.65	28
12	40	(Australia) Cameron McLean	Paragon Motorsport	Ford Falcon (AU)	35	+ 36.49	11
13	10	(Australia) Mark Larkham	Larkham Motor Sport	Ford Falcon (AU)	35	+ 38.96	3
14	43	(Australia) Paul Weel	Paul Weel Racing	Ford Falcon (AU)	35	+ 40.11	15
15	31	(Australia) Steven Ellery	Steven Ellery Racing	Ford Falcon (AU)	35	+ 40.49	8
16	3	(Australia) Cameron McConville	Lansvale Racing Team	Holden Commodore (VX)	35	+ 41.48	17
17	34	(Australia) Garth Tander	Garry Rogers Motorsport	Holden Commodore (VX)	35	+ 50.15	31
18	021	(New Zealand) Jason Richards	Team Kiwi Racing	Holden Commodore (VT)	35	+ 1:00.34	24
19	7	(Australia) Rodney Forbes	Gibson Motorsport	Ford Falcon (AU)	35	+ 1:01.31	25
20	24	(Australia) Paul Romano	Romano Racing	Holden Commodore (VT)	35	+ 1:02.67	23
21	54	(Australia) Tony Longhurst	Rod Nash Racing	Holden Commodore (VX)	35	+ 1:12.84	19
22	8	(Australia) Russell Ingall	Perkins Engineering	Holden Commodore (VX)	35	+ 1:22.95	1
23	75	(Australia) Anthony Tratt	Paul Little Racing	Ford Falcon (AU)	34	+ 1 lap	30
24	50	(Australia) Tyler Mecklem	Clive Wiseman Racing	Holden Commodore (VT)	34	+ 1 lap	32
25	23	(Australia) Steve Reed	Lansvale Racing Team	Holden Commodore (VS)	34	+ 1 lap	22
26	17	(Australia) Steven Johnson	Dick Johnson Racing	Ford Falcon (AU)	32	+ 3 laps	21
Ret	46	(New Zealand) John Faulkner	John Faulkner Racing	Holden Commodore (VX)	29	Brakes	26
Ret	29	(Australia) Paul Morris	Paul Morris Motorsport	Holden Commodore (VT)	28	Mechanical	10
Ret	16	(Australia) Dugal McDougall	McDougall Motorsport	Holden Commodore (VX)	20	Retired	16
Ret	00	(Australia) Craig Lowndes	Gibson Motorsport	Ford Falcon (AU)	9	Collision damage	20
Ret	600	(Australia) John Bowe	Briggs Motor Sport	Ford Falcon (AU)	5	Clutch	29
DNS	18	(New Zealand) Paul Radisich	Dick Johnson Racing	Ford Falcon (AU)		Did Not Start	
Fastest Lap: Marcos Ambrose (Stone Brothers Racing) - 1:09.0273 on lap 15

=== Race 3 ===
Three drivers would not start the third race. Dick Johnson Racing's exhaustion of engine allocation ruled Paul Radisich out, Dugal McDougall experienced mechanical issues, and damage to Craig Lowndes' car from race two could not be repaired in time for the final race of the day.

Murphy maintained his lead from pole position while Bright lost two positions after straying wide at turn one. Skaife set off in pursuit of Murphy, and contact at the hairpin on lap three almost sent the Kiwi into a spin. The next lap, Murphy set the fastest lap of the race, extending his lead over Skaife. Ingall made contact with Steven Ellery at turn seven and narrowly avoided secondary contact with the SuperCheap Auto Falcon as they both scrambled to return to the racetrack. The pit window opened on lap 10 and most of the front-runners took the opportunity to take their compulsory pitstops. Ingall stayed out longer than most and assumed the lead, finally pitting on lap 17. Todd Kelly was penalised for a pitlane equipment violation.

On lap 23, it was reported that Murphy began to struggle with a sticking throttle. As a result, Skaife rapidly caught and passed him for the lead. Bright and Ambrose followed suit soon after. John Faulkner retired on lap 19 due to a faulty alternator. Larry Perkins was issued a bad sportsmanship flag for excessive blocking. Murphy's pace continued to suffer and with the throttle issue continuing to worsen, he began to dip the clutch in on the down change, putting considerable strain on the engine. He would eventually finish the race in 12th, pulling to the side of the road shortly after the finish line.

Skaife remained unchallenged to the flag, taking victory over teammate, Bright. Marcos Ambrose finished third, and in doing so, claimed his first overall round victory in his V8 Supercar career.

Pos	No	Driver	Team	Car	Laps	Time	Grid
1	1	(Australia) Mark Skaife	Holden Racing Team	Holden Commodore (VX)	35	41min 32.6878sec	3
2	2	(Australia) Jason Bright	Holden Racing Team	Holden Commodore (VX)	35	+ 4.90	2
3	4	(Australia) Marcos Ambrose	Stone Brothers Racing	Ford Falcon (AU)	35	+ 7.65	4
4	6	(New Zealand) Steven Richards	Glenn Seton Racing	Ford Falcon (AU)	35	+ 12.34	6
5	5	(Australia) Glenn Seton	Glenn Seton Racing	Ford Falcon (AU)	35	+ 20.99	10
6	11	(Australia) Larry Perkins	Perkins Engineering	Holden Commodore (VX)	35	+ 21.57	9
7	9	(Australia) David Besnard	Stone Brothers Racing	Ford Falcon (AU)	35	+ 25.90	5
8	21	(Australia) Brad Jones	Brad Jones Racing	Ford Falcon (AU)	35	+ 28.16	11
9	8	(Australia) Russell Ingall	Perkins Engineering	Holden Commodore (VX)	35	+ 28.39	22
10	40	(Australia) Cameron McLean	Paragon Motorsport	Ford Falcon (AU)	35	+ 30.85	12
11	10	(Australia) Mark Larkham	Larkham Motorsport	Ford Falcon (AU)	35	+ 32.50	13
12	51	(New Zealand) Greg Murphy	Tom Walkinshaw Racing Australia	Holden Commodore (VX)	35	+ 33.41	1
13	35	(Australia) Jason Bargwanna	Garry Rogers Motorsport	Holden Commodore (VX)	35	+ 35.28	7
14	34	(Australia) Garth Tander	Garry Rogers Motorsport	Holden Commodore (VX)	35	+ 36.30	17
15	600	(Australia) John Bowe	Briggs Motorsport	Ford Falcon (AU)	35	+ 36.38	31
16	17	(Australia) Steven Johnson	Dick Johnson Racing	Ford Falcon (AU)	35	+ 40.49	26
17	31	(Australia) Steven Ellery	Steven Ellery Racing	Ford Falcon (AU)	35	+ 42.74	15
18	3	(Australia) Cameron McConville	Lansvale Racing Team	Holden Commodore (VX)	35	+ 45.35	16
19	43	(Australia) Paul Weel	Paul Weel Racing	Ford Falcon (AU)	35	+ 46.64	14
20	15	(Australia) Todd Kelly	Tom Walkinshaw Racing Australia	Holden Commodore (VX)	35	+ 55.37	8
21	7	(Australia) Rodney Forbes	Gibson Motorsport	Ford Falcon (AU)	35	+ 58.96	19
22	24	(Australia) Paul Romano	Romano Racing	Holden Commodore (VT)	35	+ 1:08.04	20
23	021	(New Zealand) Jason Richards	Team Kiwi Racing	Holden Commodore (VT)	35	+ 1:09.49	18
24	75	(Australia) Anthony Tratt	Paul Little Racing	Ford Falcon (AU)	35	+ 1:09.77	23
25	29	(Australia) Paul Morris	Paul Morris Motorsport	Holden Commodore (VT)	34	+ 1 lap	28
26	50	(Australia) Tyler Mecklem	Clive Wiseman Racing	Holden Commodore (VT)	34	+ 1 lap	24
27	23	(Australia) Steve Reed	Lansvale Racing Team	Holden Commodore (VS)	34	+ 1 lap	25
28	54	(Australia) Tony Longhurst	Rod Nash Racing	Holden Commodore (VX)	34	+ 1 lap	21
Ret	46	(New Zealand) John Faulkner	John Faulkner Racing	Holden Commodore (VX)	19	Alternator	27
DNS	00	(Australia) Craig Lowndes	Gibson Motorsport	Ford Falcon (AU)		Did not start	
DNS	18	(New Zealand) Paul Radisich	Dick Johnson Racing	Ford Falcon (AU)		Did not start	
DNS	16	(Australia) Dugal McDougall	McDougall Motorsport	Holden Commodore (VX)		Did not start	
Fastest Lap: Glenn Seton (Glenn Seton Racing) - 1:09.0947 on lap 15

== Championship points ==
Round points tally

Pos.	No	Driver	Team	Pts
1	4	(Australia) Marcos Ambrose	Stone Brothers Racing	232
2	2	(Australia) Jason Bright	Holden Racing Team	222
3	1	(Australia) Mark Skaife	Holden Racing Team	218
4	51	(New Zealand) Greg Murphy	Tom Walkinshaw Racing Australia	211
5	9	(Australia) David Besnard	Stone Brothers Racing	177

Drivers' Championship standings after Round 4

Pos.	No	Driver	Team	Pts
1	2	(Australia) Jason Bright	Holden Racing Team	1132
1	1	(Australia) Mark Skaife	Holden Racing Team	1078
3	8	(Australia) Russell Ingall	Perkins Engineering	889
4	4	(Australia) Marcos Ambrose	Stone Brothers Racing	840
5	51	(New Zealand) Greg Murphy	Tom Walkinshaw Racing Australia	835
