= Volvo Dealer Racing =

- Manufacturer: Volvo
- Team Principal: George Shepheard
- Race Drivers: Tony Scott (1994-95, 97); Peter Brock (1994-96); Kent Youlden (1994); Jim Richards (1996-99); Cameron McLean (1997, 99); Jan Nilsson (1997-98); Rickard Rydell (1997-98); Tim Harvey (1998); Mark Adderton (1999); Mark Williamson (1999); Craig Baird (1999); Matthew Coleman (1999)
- Chassis: 850 GLT; 850 T-5R; 850 Estate; 850; S40
- Debut: 1994
- 2nd (Richards)

Volvo Dealer Racing, known originally as the Volvo Dealer Team and occasionally as Volvo 850 Racing, Volvo S40 Racing and Volvo Racing was an Australian motor racing team that debuted in 1994 competing in the Australian Production Car Championship and at the Bathurst 12 Hour before stepping up to the new Australian Super Touring Championship in 1995 and continued racing through to 1999.

== History ==
In 1994, Volvo contracted George Shepherd's Roadsafe Motorsport to manage a Group E production car programme. The team first appeared at that year's Bathurst 12 Hour, running a Volvo 850 T-5R in Class T and an 850 GLT in Class B. Tony Scott would continue driving the 850 GLT, claiming third in the 1994 Australian Production Car Championship. The T-5R re-appeared at the 1994 Sandown 500 with Kent Youlden driving alongside Dutch Formula 1 driver Jan Lammers winning its class and finishing fourth amongst the production cars.

In 1995, the team benched the production cars as the 12 Hour race left Bathurst to move to an end of season race at Eastern Creek Raceway, with the team entering the Australian Super Touring Championship, acquiring a Volvo 850 Estate that had been campaigned in the 1994 British Touring Car Championship from Tom Walkinshaw Racing.

In 1996, Peter Brock was signed to drive a more conventional Volvo 850 sedan. Jim Richards would drive the car to win the 1996 Bathurst 1000 support event, before replacing Brock full-time in 1997. In 1998, the team upgraded to a S40 winning the Bathurst 1000.

The team expanded to two S40s in 1999 with Cameron McLean, Mark Adderton and Mark Williamson driving the second car. The team closed at the end of 1999 after a loss of factory support from Volvo.
