= Greenfield Mowers Racing =

- Manufacturer: BMW; Opel; Ford
- Team Principal: John McLean
- Race Drivers: Cameron McLean; Tony Scott; Wayne Park; John Cleland
- Chassis: BMW M3; BMW 318i Opel Vectra; BMW 320i Ford EL Falcon; Ford AU Falcon
- Drivers' Championships: 1

Greenfield Mowers Racing was a motor racing team that competed in Australia from the early 1990s until 2000.

== History ==
Greenfield Mowers Racing first came to national prominence competing in the 1995 Australian Sports Sedan Championship with Cameron McLean winning the series in an ex Tony Longhurst Racing BMW M3. At the end of 1995, Tony Longhurst's 1994 Australian 2 litre Championship winning BMW 318i was purchased from Steven Ellery Racing and debuted at the Australian Grand Prix support race. McLean raced it throughout the 1996 Australian Super Touring Championship.

For 1997, a Ray Mallock built Opel Vectra was purchased from South Africa. For 1998 Paul Morris' championship winning BMW 320i was purchased.

In 1999, the team switched to V8 Supercars with an ex Dick Johnson Racing Ford Falcon EL. In 2000, an ex Paul Weel Racing Falcon AU was purchased.

Many of the staff and some of the team's equipment would move to Paragon Motorsport for the 2001 season.
