= 1999 Adelaide 500 =

(South Australia) 1999 Sensational Adelaide 500
Event Information
- Round 2 of 13 in the 1999 Shell Championship Series
- Date: 9–11 April 1999
- Location: Adelaide, South Australia
- Venue: Adelaide Street Circuit
- Weather: Fine

Results
Race 1
Distance	156 laps	500 km
Pole position	Jason Bright; Stone Brothers Racing	1:25.2366
Winner	Craig Lowndes; Holden Racing Team	25:35:23.0240
Round Results
First	Craig Lowndes; Holden Racing Team	300 pts
Second	Greg Murphy; Gibson Motorsport	268 pts
Third	Russell Ingall; Perkins Engineering	244 pts

The 1999 Sensational Adelaide 500 was the first running of the Adelaide 500 race, the first motor racing meeting held on the Adelaide Street Circuit since the 1995 Australian Grand Prix. Despite racing at the Mount Panorama Circuit notwithstanding, it was the first domestic racing meeting held on public roads since the closure of the Longford Circuit in Tasmania in the 1960s.

== Format ==
Racing was held from Friday 9 April until Sunday 11 April 1999. The race was held for V8 Supercars and was Round 2 of the 1999 Shell Championship Series. The format, unique to V8 Supercar and loosely similar to the Pukekohe 500 format, consisted of two 250 km races.

The original format called for the two races to form a single race, separated by an overnight rest at half distance, however with several significant competitors retiring from the first leg a change to the regulations was announced on the Saturday evening, allowing retired cars to be repaired and restarted for Sunday's Leg 2.

== Official results ==
=== Qualifying ===
Pos	No	Driver	Team	Vehicle	Time
1	5	(Australia) Glenn Seton	Glenn Seton Racing	Ford Falcon (AU)	1:25.0825
2	2	(Australia) Mark Skaife	Holden Racing Team	Holden Commodore (VT)	1:25.4003
3	6	(Australia) Neil Crompton	Glenn Seton Racing	Ford Falcon (EL)	1:25.6223
4	4	(Australia) Jason Bright	Stone Brothers Racing	Ford Falcon (AU)	1:25.7014
5	8	(Australia) Russell Ingall	Perkins Engineering	Holden Commodore (VT)	1:25.8117
6	1	(Australia) Craig Lowndes	Holden Racing Team	Holden Commodore (VT)	1:25.9111
7	46	(New Zealand) John Faulkner	John Faulkner Racing	Holden Commodore (VT)	1:25.9246
8	10	(Australia) Mark Larkham	Larkham Motorsport	Ford Falcon (AU)	1:26.0062
9	18	(New Zealand) Paul Radisich	Dick Johnson Racing	Ford Falcon (AU)	1:26.0117
10	34	(Australia) Garth Tander	Garry Rogers Motorsport	Holden Commodore (VS)	1:26.0442
11	600	(Australia) John Bowe	PAE Motorsport	Ford Falcon (EL)	1:26.1708
12	25	(Australia) Tony Longhurst	Longhurst Racing	Ford Falcon (AU)	1:26.4733
13	19	(Australia) Wayne Gardner	Wayne Gardner Racing	Holden Commodore (VT)	1:26.5380
14	11	(Australia) Larry Perkins	Perkins Engineering	Holden Commodore (VT)	1:26.7727
15	35	(Australia) Jason Bargwanna	Garry Rogers Motorsport	Holden Commodore (VT)	1:26.7929
16	12	(New Zealand) Greg Murphy	Gibson Motorsport	Holden Commodore (VT)	1:26.8248
17	17	(Australia) Dick Johnson	Dick Johnson Racing	Ford Falcon (AU)	1:26.8577
18	32	(Australia) Tomas Mezera	Tomas Mezera Motorsport	Holden Commodore (VT)	1:27.0102
19	99	(Australia) Mark Noske	Holden Young Lions	Holden Commodore (VS)	1:27.1838
20	40	(Australia) Cameron McLean	Greenfield Mowers Racing	Ford Falcon (EL)	1:27.3360
21	7	(New Zealand) Steven Richards	Gibson Motorsport	Holden Commodore (VT)	1:27.3402
22	3	(Australia) Trevor Ashby	Lansvale Racing Team	Holden Commodore (VS)	1:27.7238
23	16	(Australia) Dugal McDougall	McDougall Motorsport	Holden Commodore (VS)	1:28.3738
24	50	(Australia) Michael Donaher	Clive Wiseman Racing	Holden Commodore (VS)	1:28.4740
25	70	(Australia) John Briggs	Briggs Motorsport	Ford Falcon (AU)	1:28.7920
26	39	(Australia) Chris Smerdon	Challenge Motorsport	Holden Commodore (VS)	1:29.1143
27	26	(Australia) Peter Doulman	M3 Motorsport	Holden Commodore (VS)	1:29.1719
28	28	(Australia) Rodney Forbes	Bob Forbes Racing	Holden Commodore (VS)	1:29.7582
29	54	(Australia) Simon Emerzidis	Emerzidis Motorsport	Ford Falcon (EL)	1:30.1821
30	22	(Australia) Danny Osborne	Peters Motorsport	Ford Falcon (EL)	1:30.3384
31	72	(Australia) David Parsons	Robert Smith Racing	Holden Commodore (VS)	1:30.5751
32	98	(Australia) Kerryn Brewer	Owen Parkinson Racing	Holden Commodore (VS)	1:30.7436
33	55	(Australia) Rod Nash	Rod Nash Racing	Holden Commodore (VS)	1:31.7882
34	14	(Australia) Mike Imrie	Imrie Motorsport	Holden Commodore (VS)	1:31.8736
35	79	(Australia) Mike Conway	Cadillac Productions	Ford Falcon (EL)	1:32.0681
36	52	(Australia) Barry Morcom	Barry Morcom Racing	Holden Commodore (VS)	1:32.3577
37	48	(Australia) D'Arcy Russell	Rod Smith Racing	Holden Commodore (VS)	1:33.9849
38	134	(Australia) Alan Heath	Power Racing	Ford Falcon (EL)	1:34.3131
39	84	(Australia) Daniel Miller	Miller Racing	Holden Commodore (VS)	1:47.1338

=== Top ten shootout ===
Pos	No	Driver	Team	Vehicle	Time
1	4	(Australia) Jason Bright	Stone Brothers Racing	Ford Falcon (AU)	1:25.2366
2	2	(Australia) Mark Skaife	Holden Racing Team	Holden Commodore (VT)	1:25.6572
3	1	(Australia) Craig Lowndes	Holden Racing Team	Holden Commodore (VT)	1:25.6821
4	34	(Australia) Garth Tander	Garry Rogers Motorsport	Holden Commodore (VS)	1:26.0117
5	18	(New Zealand) Paul Radisich	Dick Johnson Racing	Ford Falcon (AU)	1:26.0615
6	6	(Australia) Neil Crompton	Glenn Seton Racing	Ford Falcon (EL)	1:26.4795
7	8	(Australia) Russell Ingall	Perkins Engineering	Holden Commodore (VT)	1:26.5728
8	5	(Australia) Glenn Seton	Glenn Seton Racing	Ford Falcon (AU)	1:26.6091
9	10	(Australia) Mark Larkham	Larkham Motorsport	Ford Falcon (AU)	1:26.7478
10	46	(New Zealand) John Faulkner	John Faulkner Racing	Holden Commodore (VT)	1:26.7741

=== Leg 1 ===
Results sourced from:

Pos	No	Team	Drivers	Car	Qual Pos	Shootout Pos
1	1	Holden Racing Team	(Australia) Craig Lowndes	Holden VT Commodore	6	3
2	5	Glenn Seton Racing	(Australia) Glenn Seton	Ford AU Falcon	1	8
3	34	Garry Rogers Motorsport	(Australia) Garth Tander	Holden VS Commodore	10	4
4	12	Gibson Motorsport	(New Zealand) Greg Murphy	Holden VT Commodore	16	
5	8	Perkins Engineering	(Australia) Russell Ingall	Holden VT Commodore	5	7
6	40	Greenfield Mowers Racing	(Australia) Cameron McLean	Ford EL Falcon	20	
7	10	Larkham Motor Sport	(Australia) Mark Larkham	Ford AU Falcon	8	9
8	4	Stone Brothers Racing	(Australia) Jason Bright	Ford AU Falcon	4	1
9	25	Longhurst Racing	(Australia) Tony Longhurst	Ford AU Falcon	11	
10	2	Holden Racing Team	(Australia) Mark Skaife	Holden VT Commodore	2	2
11	3	Lansvale Racing Team	(Australia) Trevor Ashby	Holden VS Commodore	22	
12	50	Clive Wiseman Racing	(Australia) Michael Donaher	Holden VS Commodore	24	
13	16	McDougall Motorsport	(Australia) Dugal McDougall	Holden VS Commodore	23	
14	99	Holden Young Lions	(Australia) Mark Noske	Holden VS Commodore	19	
15	600	PAE Motorsport	(Australia) John Bowe	Ford EL Falcon	11	
16	7	Gibson Motorsport	(New Zealand) Steven Richards	Holden VT Commodore	21	
17	72	Robert Smith Racing	(Australia) David Parsons	Holden VS Commodore	31	
18	26	M3 Motorsport	(Australia) Peter Doulman	Holden VS Commodore	27	
19	32	Tomas Mezera Motorsport	(Australia) Tomas Mezera	Holden VT Commodore	18	
20	79	Cadillac Productions	(Australia) Mike Conway	Ford EL Falcon	35	
21	48	Rod Smith Racing	(Australia) D'arcy Russell	Holden VS Commodore	30	
22	14	Imrie Motor Sport	(Australia) Mike Imrie	Holden VS Commodore	34	
23	46	John Faulkner Racing	(New Zealand) John Faulkner	Holden VT Commodore	7	10
24	17	Dick Johnson Racing	(Australia) Dick Johnson	Ford AU Falcon	17	
25	6	Glenn Seton Racing	(Australia) Neil Crompton	Ford EL Falcon	3	6
26	98	Owen Parkinson Racing	(Australia) Kerryn Brewer	Holden VS Commodore	32	
27	18	Dick Johnson Racing	(New Zealand) Paul Radisich	Ford AU Falcon	9	5
28	134	Power Racing	(Australia) Alan Heath	Ford EL Falcon	38	
29	55	Rod Nash Racing	(Australia) Rod Nash	Holden VS Commodore	33	
30	54	Simon Emerzidis	(Australia) Simon Emerzidis	Ford EL Falcon	29	
31	52	Barry Morcom	(Australia) Barry Morcom	Holden VS Commodore	36	
32	39	Challenge Motorsport	(Australia) Chris Smerdon	Holden VS Commodore	26	
33	35	Garry Rogers Motorsport	(Australia) Jason Bargwanna	Holden VT Commodore	15	
34	28	Bob Forbes Racing	(Australia) Rodney Forbes	Holden VS Commodore	28	
35	22	Colourscan Racing	(Australia) Danny Osborne	Ford EL Falcon	30	
36	24	Romano Racing	(Australia) Paul Romano	Holden VS Commodore	DNQ	
37	11	Perkins Engineering	(Australia) Larry Perkins	Holden VT Commodore	14	
38	70	Briggs Motor Sport	(Australia) John Briggs	Ford EL Falcon	25	
39	19	Wayne Gardner Racing	(Australia) Wayne Gardner	Holden VT Commodore	13	
DNS	84	Miller Racing	(Australia) Daniel Miller	Holden VS Commodore	39	

=== Leg 2 ===
Results sourced from:

Pos	No	Team	Drivers	Car	Laps	Qual Pos	Shootout Pos	Leg 1
1	1	Holden Racing Team	(Australia) Craig Lowndes	Holden VT Commodore	156	6	3	1
2	12	Gibson Motorsport	(New Zealand) Greg Murphy	Holden VT Commodore	156	16		4
3	4	Stone Brothers Racing	(Australia) Jason Bright	Ford AU Falcon	156	4	1	8
4	8	Perkins Engineering	(Australia) Russell Ingall	Holden VT Commodore	156	5	7	5
5	7	Gibson Motorsport	(New Zealand) Steven Richards	Holden VT Commodore	155	21		16
6	99	Holden Young Lions	(Australia) Mark Noske	Holden VS Commodore	156	19		14
7	11	Perkins Engineering	(Australia) Larry Perkins	Holden VT Commodore	155	14		37
8	35	Garry Rogers Motorsport	(Australia) Jason Bargwanna	Holden VT Commodore	155	15		33
9	5	Glenn Seton Racing	(Australia) Glenn Seton	Ford AU Falcon	155	1	8	2
10	17	Dick Johnson Racing	(Australia) Dick Johnson	Ford AU Falcon	155	17		24
11	600	PAE Motorsport	(Australia) John Bowe	Ford EL Falcon	155	11		15
12	40	Greenfeld Mowers Racing	(Australia) Cameron McLean	Ford EL Falcon	154	20		6
13	6	Ford Tickford Racing	(Australia) Neil Crompton	Ford EL Falcon	154	3	6	25
14	19	Wayne Gardner Racing	(Australia) Wayne Gardner	Holden VT Commodore	154	13		39
15	50	Clive Wiseman Racing	(Australia) Michael Donaher	Holden VS Commodore	153	24		12
16	28	Bob Forbes Racing	(Australia) Rodney Forbes	Holden VS Commodore	153	28		34
17	39	Challenge Motorsport	(Australia) Chris Smerdon	Holden VS Commodore	153	26		32
18	72	Robert Smith Racing	(Australia) David Parsons	Holden VS Commodore	153	31		17
19	26	M3 Motorsport	(Australia) Peter Doulman	Holden VT Commodore	152	27		18
20	32	Tomas Mezera Motorsport	(Australia) Tomas Mezera	Holden VT Commodore	152	18		19
21	54	Simon Emerzidis	(Australia) Simon Emerzidis	Ford EL Falcon	150	29		30
22	48	Rod Smith Racing	(Australia) D'arcy Russell	Holden VS Commodore	149	30		21
23	3	Lansvale Racing Team	(Australia) Trevor Ashby	Holden VS Commodore	149	22		11
24	34	Garry Rogers Motorsport	(Australia) Garth Tander	Holden VS Commodore	148	10	4	3
25	134	Power Racing	(Australia) Alan Heath	Ford EL Falcon	146	38		28
26	79	Cadillac Productions	(Australia) Mike Conway	Ford EL Falcon	131	35		20
DNF	18	Dick Johnson Racing	(New Zealand) Paul Radisich	Ford AU Falcon	137	9	5	27
DNF	10	Larkham Motor Sport	(Australia) Mark Larkham	Ford AU Falcon	135	8	9	7
DNF	2	Holden Racing Team	(Australia) Mark Skaife	Holden VT Commodore	130	2	2	10
DNF	25	Longhurst Racing	(Australia) Tony Longhurst	Ford AU Falcon	128	11		9
DNF	46	John Faulkner Racing	(New Zealand) John Faulkner	Holden VT Commodore	120	7	10	23
DNF	55	Rod Nash Racing	(Australia) Rod Nash	Holden VS Commodore	115	33		29
DNF	16	McDougall Motorsport	(Australia) Dugal McDougall	Holden VS Commodore	104	23		13
DNF	14	Imrie Motor Sport	(Australia) Mike Imrie	Holden VS Commodore	104	34		22
DNF	98	Owen Parkinson Racing	(Australia) Kerryn Brewer	Holden VS Commodore	98	32		26
DNF	24	Romano Racing	(Australia) Paul Romano	Holden VS Commodore	78	DNQ		36
DNF	52	Barry Morcom	(Australia) Barry Morcom	Holden VS Commodore	47	36		31
DNF	22	Colourscan Racing	(Australia) Danny Osborne	Ford EL Falcon	26	30		35
DNF	70	Briggs Motor Sport	(Australia) John Briggs	Ford EL Falcon	3	25		38
DNS	84	Miller Racing	(Australia) Daniel Miller	Holden VS Commodore		39		DNS

=== Round results ===
Pos	No	Driver	Leg 1 Points	Leg 2 Points	Total Points
1	1	(Australia) Craig Lowndes	100	200	300
2	12	(New Zealand) Greg Murphy	84	184	268
3	8	(Australia) Russell Ingall	80	168	248
4	4	(Australia) Jason Bright	68	176	244
5	5	(Australia) Glenn Seton	92	128	210
6	7	(New Zealand) Steven Richards	36	160	196
7	99	(Australia) Mark Noske	44	152	196
8	40	(Australia) Cameron McLean	76	104	180
9	600	(Australia) John Bowe	40	112	152
10	11	(Australia) Larry Perkins		144	144
11	35	(Australia) Jason Bargwanna		136	136
12	50	(Australia) Michael Donaher	52	80	132
13	17	(Australia) Dick Johnson	4	120	124
14	6	(Australia) Neil Crompton	2	96	98
15	34	(Australia) Garth Tander	88	8	96
16	19	(Australia) Wayne Gardner		88	88
17	72	(Australia) David Parsons	32	56	88
18	26	(Australia) Peter Doulman	28	48	76
19	28	(Australia) Rodney Forbes		72	72
20	3	(Australia) Trevor Ashby	56	16	72
21	10	(Australia) Mark Larkham	72		72
22	39	(Australia) Chris Smerdon		64	64
23	32	(Australia) Tomas Mezera	24	40	64
24	25	(Australia) Tony Longhurst	64		64
25	2	(Australia) Mark Skaife	60		60
26	16	(Australia) Dugal McDougall	48		48
27	48	(Australia) D'arcy Russell	16	24	40
28	54	(Australia) Simon Emerzidis		32	32
29	79	(Australia) Mike Conway	20		20
30	14	(Australia) Mike Imrie	12		12
31	46	(New Zealand) John Faulkner	8		8
32	134	(Australia) Alan Heath		4	4
DNF	18	(New Zealand) Paul Radisich			
DNF	55	(Australia) Rod Nash			
DNF	98	(Australia) Kerryn Brewer			
DNF	52	(Australia) Barry Morcom			
DNF	24	(Australia) Paul Romano			
DNF	22	(Australia) Danny Osborne			
DNF	70	(Australia) John Briggs			
DNS	84	(Australia) Daniel Miller			

== Statistics ==
- Provisional Position - #5 Glenn Seton - 1:25.0825
- Pole Position - #4 Jason Bright - 1:25.2366
- Fastest Lap - #4 Jason Bright - 1:26.2491 (lap record)

V8 Supercar
Previous race: 1999 Eastern Creek V8 Supercar Round	1999 season	Next race: 1999 Wanneroo V8 Supercar Round
