= 1999 FAI 1000 =

Motor race in Australia

Seasons
- ← 1998 2000 →

(New South Wales) 1999 FAI 1000
Event Information
- Round 13 of 13 in the 1999 Shell Championship Series
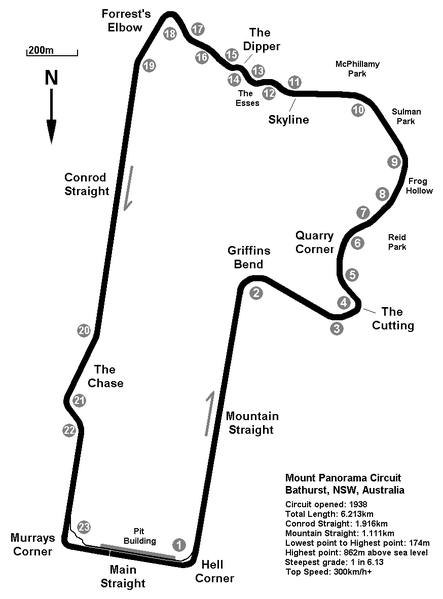
- Date: 11–14 November 1999
- Location: Bathurst, New South Wales
- Venue: Mount Panorama Circuit
- Weather: Fine

Results
Race 1
Distance	161 laps	1000 km
Pole position	(Australia) Mark Larkham; Larkham Motor Sport	2:09.5146
Winner	(New Zealand) Greg Murphy (New Zealand) Steven Richards; Gibson Motorsport	6:51:48.8354
Round Results
First	(New Zealand) Greg Murphy (New Zealand) Steven Richards; Gibson Motorsport	300 pts
Second	(Australia) Craig Lowndes (Australia) Cameron McConville; Holden Racing Team	276 pts
Third	(Australia) Mark Skaife (Australia) Paul Morris; Holden Racing Team	264 pts

The 1999 FAI 1000 was an endurance race for V8 Supercars. The event was held on 14 November 1999 at the Mount Panorama Circuit just outside Bathurst, New South Wales, Australia and was the thirteenth and final round of the 1999 Shell Championship Series. It was the first year that the traditional spring endurance race at Bathurst was part of the Australian Touring Car Championship.

The race was the third running of the "Australia 1000", first held after the organisational split over the Bathurst 1000 that occurred in 1997. 1999 was the 37th consecutive year in which a touring car endurance race was held at the Mount Panorama Circuit and the event was the 42nd race that traces its lineage back to the 1960 Armstrong 500 held at Phillip Island.

The event's naming rights sponsor was FAI Insurance.

== Entry list ==
57 cars entered the race, the first full field (55 cars or more) since 1990. Alongside the outright contenders, the "Privateers Cup" was contested by 28 Level 2 and 3 licence holders who competed in the sprint rounds of the 1999 season. 20 Ford Falcons (12 AUs and 8 ELs) and 37 Holden Commodores (15 VTs, 21 VSs and 1 VP) were entered in the event. Owen Parkinson Racing, one of the 57 entries, withdrew their Commodore VS prior to the event.

Paul Dumbrell made history as the youngest race starter (since surpassed by Cameron Waters in 2011) at 17 years, 2 months and 14 days; surpassing Bryan Sala's record (set in 1991) by a single day. Of the 114 drivers, only John Cleland came from outside Australia and New Zealand. Three-time 'Great Race' winner Dick Johnson made both his 26th and final Bathurst start.

No.	Class	Drivers	Team (Sponsor)	Car	No.	Class	Drivers	Team (Sponsor)	Car
1	O	(Australia) Craig Lowndes (Australia) Cameron McConville	Holden Racing Team (Holden, Mobil 1)	Holden Commodore VT	39	P	(Australia) Charlie Cox (Australia) Chris Smerdon	Challenge Motorsport (Vittoria Coffee, IT Services)	Holden Commodore VS
2	O	(Australia) Mark Skaife (Australia) Paul Morris	Holden Racing Team (Holden, Mobil 1)	Holden Commodore VT	40	P	(Australia) Cameron McLean (United Kingdom) John Cleland	Greenfield Mowers Racing (Greenfield Mowers)	Ford Falcon EL
3	P	(Australia) Trevor Ashby (Australia) Steve Reed	Lansvale Smash Repairs (Optus, PPG)	Holden Commodore VS	41	P	(Australia) Garry Holt (Australia) Bill Sieders	Emerzidis Motorsport (Eastern Creek Karting)	Ford Falcon EL
4	O	(Australia) Jason Bright (New Zealand) Craig Baird	Stone Brothers Racing (Pirtek)	Ford Falcon AU	42	P	(Australia) Scott Flemming (Australia) Mark Williams	Colourscan Racing (OzEmail)	Ford Falcon EL
5	O	(Australia) Glenn Seton (Australia) Neil Crompton	Glenn Seton Racing (Ford, Ford Credit)	Ford Falcon AU	43	O	(Australia) Paul Weel (Australia) Greg Crick	Paul Weel Racing (K&J Thermal Products)	Ford Falcon AU
6	O	(Australia) Geoff Brabham (Australia) Neal Bates	Glenn Seton Racing (Ford, Ford Credit)	Ford Falcon AU	46	O	(New Zealand) John Faulkner (New Zealand) Simon Wills	John Faulkner Racing (Wynn's)	Holden Commodore VT
7	O	(New Zealand) Greg Murphy (New Zealand) Steven Richards	Gibson Motorsport (Wynn's)	Holden Commodore VT	47	O	(Australia) John Trimbole (Australia) Kevin Heffernan	Daily Planet Racing (Daily Planet)	Holden Commodore VS
10	O	(Australia) Mark Larkham (Australia) Brad Jones	Larkham Motor Sport (Mitre 10)	Ford Falcon AU	48	P	(Australia) D'Arcy Russell (Australia) Grant Johnson	Rod Smith Racing (Playboy, Company Solutions)	Holden Commodore VS
11	O	(Australia) Larry Perkins (Australia) Russell Ingall	Perkins Engineering (Castrol)	Holden Commodore VT	49	P	(Australia) Layton Crambrook (Australia) Dean Crosswell	Crambrook Racing (Hidden Valley, SolaHart)	Holden Commodore VS
14	P	(Australia) Mike Imrie (Australia) Rodney Crick	Imrie Motorsport (STP, Narellan Town Centre)	Holden Commodore VS	50	P	(Australia) Dean Lindstrom (Australia) Melinda Price	Clive Wiseman Racing (Ultra Tune)	Holden Commodore VS
15	O	(Australia) Todd Kelly (Australia) Mark Noske	Holden Young Lions (MyCar Automotive Store)	Holden Commodore VT	54	P	(Australia) Simon Emerzidis (Australia) Garry Willmington	Emerzidis Motorsport (Simon's Earthworks & Waste)	Ford Falcon EL
16	O	(Australia) Dugal McDougall (Australia) Andrew Miedecke	McDougall Motorsport (Aloe Quench)	Holden Commodore VT	55	P	(Australia) Rod Nash (Australia) Dean Wanless	Rod Nash Racing (AutoPro)	Holden Commodore VT
17	O	(Australia) Dick Johnson (Australia) Steven Johnson	Dick Johnson Racing (Shell Helix)	Ford Falcon AU	60	P	(Australia) Nathan Pretty (New Zealand) Andrew Fawcett	Pretty Motorsport (Lewington's Transport)	Holden Commodore VS
18	O	(New Zealand) Paul Radisich (Australia) Steve Ellery	Dick Johnson Racing (Shell Helix)	Ford Falcon AU	66	O	(Australia) Mark Poole (Australia) Tony Scott	James Rosenberg Racing (John Deere)	Holden Commodore VT
19	O	(Australia) Wayne Gardner (Australia) David Brabham	Wayne Gardner Racing (Coca-Cola, McDonald's)	Holden Commodore VT	70	O	(Australia) John Briggs (Australia) Tim Leahey	Briggs Motor Sport (Supercheap Auto)	Ford Falcon AU
22	O	(Australia) Danny Osborne (Australia) Brett Peters	Colourscan Racing (Colourscan Printing)	Ford Falcon AU	73	O	(Australia) David Parsons (Australia) David Parsons	Gibson Motorsport (Challenge Recruitment)	Holden Commodore VT
24	O	(Australia) Paul Romano (Australia) Darren Hossack	Romano Racing (Siemens Mobile)	Holden Commodore VS	75	O	(Australia) Anthony Tratt (Australia) Alan Jones	Paul Little Racing (Toll)	Ford Falcon AU
25	O	(Australia) Tony Longhurst (Australia) Adam Macrow	Longhurst Racing (Castrol)	Ford Falcon AU	77	P	(Australia) Richard Mork (Australia) Christian D’Agostin	V8 Racing (v8racing.com, Lamattina & Sons)	Holden Commodore VS
26	P	(Australia) Peter Doulman (Australia) John Cotter	Doulman Automotive (Gatorade)	Holden Commodore VT	79	P	(Australia) Mike Conway (Australia) Ric Shaw	Cadillac Productions (SMS Consulting)	Ford Falcon EL
27	P	(Australia) Terry Finnigan (Australia) Darren Pate	Finnigan Racing (carsales.com.au, DWS)	Holden Commodore VS	80	P	(Australia) Bob Thorn (Australia) Todd Wanless	Briggs Motor Sport (Supercheap Auto)	Ford Falcon EL
28	P	(Australia) Rodney Forbes (Australia) Geoff Full	Bob Forbes Racing (DietShake, Harlequin)	Holden Commodore VS	81	P	(Australia) Tim Rowse (Australia) Ron Barnacle	Rowse Motorsport (Rowse Motors)	Holden Commodore VP
30	P	(Australia) Craig Harris (Australia) Tim Shaw	Harris Racing (Brisbane City Auto Group)	Ford Falcon EL	84	P	(Australia) Daniel Miller (Australia) Geoff Kendrick	Miller Racing (92.9 PMFM)	Holden Commodore VS
32	O	(Australia) Tomas Mezera (Australia) Tony Ricciardello	Tomas Mezera Motorsport (Densitron)	Holden Commodore VT	87	P	(Australia) Damien White (Australia) Rod Salmon	Rod Salmon Racing (OneWorld Hotel)	Holden Commodore VS
33	P	(Australia) Phil Ward (Australia) Allan McCarthy	Phil Ward Racing (Pro-Duct Air Conditioning)	Holden Commodore VS	96	O	(Australia) Matthew White (Australia) Paul Dumbrell	John Faulkner Racing (Wynn's)	Holden Commodore VS
34	O	(Australia) Garth Tander (Australia) Jason Bargwanna	Garry Rogers Motorsport (Valvoline)	Holden Commodore VT	97	P	(Australia) Wayne Wakefield (Australia) Dean Canto	Graphic Skills Racing (Graphic Skills)	Holden Commodore VS
35	O	(Australia) Greg Ritter (Australia) Steve Owen	Garry Rogers Motorsport (Valvoline)	Holden Commodore VT	98	P	(Australia) Barry Cassidy (Australia) Neil Crowe	Owen Parkinson Racing (unknown)	Holden Commodore VS
36	P	(Australia) Neil Schembri (Australia) Gary Quartly	Schembri Motorsport (GearBox)	Holden Commodore VS	134	P	(Australia) Alan Heath (Australia) Mick Donaher	Power Racing (West Terrace 4x4)	Ford Falcon EL
37	P	(Australia) Alan Taylor (Australia) Bill Attard	Alan Taylor Racing (The Xerox Shop)	Holden Commodore VS	600	O	(Australia) John Bowe (New Zealand) Jim Richards	PAE Motorsport (Caterpillar)	Ford Falcon AU
38	P	(Australia) Peter Field (Australia) Shane Howison	South Pacific Motor Racing (Motul, Robbo's Spare Parts)	Holden Commodore VS					

Icon	Class
O	Outright
P	Privateers

== Report ==
For the first time the Bathurst 1000 was a round of the Australian Touring Car Championship and drivers had to now focus not only on winning the biggest race of the year, but also had to take into consideration their championship standings. Pushing too hard for a win and ending in the wall could prove detrimental for the championship, especially with Bathurst being the last race. Craig Lowndes entered the race with a 54-point lead over Russell Ingall, 172 on Garth Tander, 226 on Glenn Seton and 250 on team-mate Mark Skaife, with 300 points on offer for the race winner. With Ingall and Larry Perkins not quite on pace and a rare mistake when Larry missed the call from his crew to pit in under an early safety car, along with a tyre puncture, Lowndes' 2nd place with Cameron McConville was more than enough to secure him his 3rd and final title, the Holden Racing Team staging a 2-3 formation finish.

In 1998 Jason Bright crashed the #4 car in practice, and with great strategy and good driving won the race – but begun the 1999 edition in the same fashion as Bright once again crashed, this time at McPhillamy Park. However early in the race in the packed pitlane caused chaos under an early safety car, with Craig Baird dragging the pit boom for the #4 car down pitlane after a mistake from the team. Further technical problems during the race on ended any chance of them repeating their 1998 success.

A record entry in the V8 Supercars era of 57 cars (one unlikely to be broken) had to be whittled down to the track maximum of 55 for the race, yet in the first half of the race the attrition from driver mistakes was still as prevalent as ever and the safety car received a lot of running. FAI Insurance had a $100,000 prize if the winner could break the 1991 race record, however thanks to a then-record 10 safety cars they got nowhere near it – FAI did give Mark Larkham a consolation $25,000 for getting pole position.

Larkham broke not just the V8 track record but Neil Allen's 1970 pre-Chase record in qualifying that he set in a Formula 5000 car. In the race their engine let go before half distance. Garth Tander was another frontrunner, but crashed into Tomas Mezera when he suffered an oil leak-induced spin. Simon Wills was leading in John Faulkner's car mid-race but spun going into the Cutting and found the wall. John Bowe got the underdog PAE Motorsport Falcon as high as 5th before engine failure put he and six-time winner Jim Richards out of the race. David Brabham had a rear tyre explode entering the Chase which saw the Wayne Gardner Racing car lift up into the air then spin around, luckily not collecting any of the cars around him as he flew back over the track and ended up half parked in the sandtrap.

Paul Radisich and Steve Ellery dominated most of the race in the #18 car, with Radisich on course for victory but with 20 laps to go clipped a slower car and received a puncture, damaging the front bodywork as he went over the kerbs entering pitlane. The bodywork damage would later block the radiator and put the Dick Johnson Racing Falcon out with overheating issues, Radisich parking the AU on Mountain Straight. Greg Murphy and Steven Richards both won their 2nd Bathurst 1000, Richards becoming the first driver to win Bathurst in both a Ford and a Holden. They started the race in 12th but quickly floated towards the front of the field, and were the closest challengers to Radisich and Ellery all race.

It would be the last of 26 starts for 3-time winner Dick Johnson, who also made his 21st Top 10 shootout – a record having taken part in all shootouts (excluding 1998) since 1978. His co-driver and son Steven had been racing for a podium against Paul Morris with about 50 laps to go before spinning at the Chase, but was able to keep going and Dick finished his Bathurst career in 4th place. Long-time privateer Alan “Scotty” Taylor made his last of 18 starts, with his 7-year-old Commodore retiring very early on with engine failure.

The race would see the debuts of both 2012 winner Paul Dumbrell (breaking the record for youngest starter in the 1000 at the time) and runner-up Dean Canto, however both were out of the race inside 50 laps having been involved in (separate) crashes. Paul Morris received the "Rookie of the Year" award despite having made multiple starts in the race previously.

Geoff Full and Rodney Forbes won the Privateer's Cup, and even led a few laps during the race on an alternate strategy before being spun out by John Bowe. Cameron McLean and John Cleland were on track to win the class but a crash heading to Reid Park ended their day prematurely, unceremoniously caught in the background of the telecast.

== Results ==
=== Pre-qualifying ===
A 1-hour pre-qualifying session was held on Thursday morning to reduce the field to 55 cars. All cars outside the top 30 in the championship were required to take part or risk failing to qualify.

Pos.	No.	Driver	Team	Car	Time	Gap
1	66	(Australia) Mark Poole (Australia) Tony Scott	James Rosenberg Racing	Holden Commodore VT	2:14.5444	
2	19	(Australia) Wayne Gardner (Australia) David Brabham	Wayne Gardner Racing	Holden Commodore VT	2:14.6019	+0.0575
3	54	(Australia) Simon Emerzidis (Australia) Garry Willmington	Emerzidis Motorsport	Ford Falcon EL	2:15.9811	+1.4367
4	39	(Australia) Charlie Cox (Australia) Chris Smerdon	Challenge Motorsport	Holden Commodore VS	2:16.3813	+1.8369
5	97	(Australia) Wayne Wakefield (Australia) Dean Canto	Graphic Skills Racing	Holden Commodore VS	2:16.4543	+1.9099
6	87	(Australia) Damien White (Australia) Rod Salmon	Rod Salmon Racing	Holden Commodore VS	2:17.3911	+2.8467
7^{1}	33	(Australia) Phil Ward (Australia) Allan McCarthy	Pro-Duct Motorsport	Holden Commodore VS	2:17.5052	+2.9608
8	134	(Australia) Alan Heath (Australia) Mick Donaher	Power Racing	Ford Falcon EL	2:17.5194	+2.9750
9	36	(Australia) Neil Schembri (Australia) Gary Quartly	Schembri Motorsport	Holden Commodore VS	2:17.8491	+3.3047
10	60	(Australia) Nathan Pretty (New Zealand) Andrew Fawcet	Pretty Motorsport	Holden Commodore VS	2:18.1827	+3.6383
11	30	(Australia) Craig Harris (Australia) Tim Shaw	Harris Racing	Ford Falcon EL	2:18.5995	+4.0551
12	27	(Australia) Terry Finnigan (Australia) Darren Pate	Terry Finnigan	Holden Commodore VS	2:18.9758	+4.4314
13	70	(Australia) John Briggs (Australia) Tim Leahey	Briggs Motor Sport	Ford Falcon AU	2:19.2682	+4.7238
14	14	(Australia) Mike Imrie (Australia) Rodney Crick	Imrie Motorsport	Holden Commodore VS	2:19.8917	+5.3473
15	22	(Australia) Danny Osborne (Australia) Brett Peters	Colourscan Racing	Ford Falcon AU	2:20.1865	+5.6421
16	47	(Australia) John Trimbole (Australia) Kevin Heffernan	Daily Planet Racing	Holden Commodore VS	2:20.4361	+5.8917
17	41	(Australia) Garry Holt (Australia) Bill Sieders	Emerzidis Motorsport	Ford Falcon EL	2:20.5586	+6.0142
18	79	(Australia) Mike Conway (Australia) Ric Shaw	Cadillac Productions	Ford Falcon EL	2:20.7140	+6.1696
19	84	(Australia) Daniel Miller (Australia) Geoff Kendrick	Miller Racing	Holden Commodore VS	2:21.0275	+6.4831
20	37	(Australia) Alan Taylor (Australia) Bill Attard	Alan Taylor Racing	Holden Commodore VS	2:21.3502	+6.8058
21	38	(Australia) Peter Field (Australia) Shane Howison	South Pacific Motor Racing	Holden Commodore VS	2:22.3578	+7.8134
22	77	(Australia) Richard Mork (Australia) Christian D'Agostin	V8 Racing	Holden Commodore VS	2:23.7267	+9.1823
23	80	(Australia) Bob Thorn (Australia) Todd Wanless	Briggs Motor Sport	Ford Falcon EL	2:24.4622	+9.9178
24	42	(Australia) Scott Fleming (Australia) Mark Williams	Colourscan Racing	Ford Falcon EL	2:24.7293	+10.1849
25	48	(Australia) D'Arcy Russell (Australia) Grant Johnson	Rod Smith Racing	Holden Commodore VS	2:29.0731	+14.5287
DNPQ^{1}	81	(Australia) Tim Rowse (Australia) Ron Barnacle	Rowse Motorsport	Holden Commodore VP	2:45.0959	+30.5515
WD	98	(Australia) Barry Cassidy (Australia) Neil Crowe	Owen Parkinson Racing	Holden Commodore VS	No time	

- ^1 – Car #33 was withdrawn from the event prior to qualifying, allowing Car #81 to return to the field.

=== Practice ===
Session	Day	Fastest lap					
Session	Day	No.	Drivers	Team	Car	Time	Ref.
Practice 1	Thursday	5	(Australia) Glenn Seton (Australia) Neil Crompton	Glenn Seton Racing	Ford Falcon AU	2:12.3018	
Practice 2	Thursday	18	(New Zealand) Paul Radisich (Australia) Steve Ellery	Dick Johnson Racing	Ford Falcon AU	2:11.2267	
Practice 3	Friday	2	(Australia) Mark Skaife (Australia) Paul Morris	Holden Racing Team	Holden Commodore VT	2:11.0667	
Practice 4	Saturday	5	(Australia) Glenn Seton (Australia) Neil Crompton	Glenn Seton Racing	Ford Falcon AU	2:12.6777	
Warm-Up	Sunday	18	(New Zealand) Paul Radisich (Australia) Steve Ellery	Dick Johnson Racing	Ford Falcon AU	2:13.1882	

=== Qualifying ===
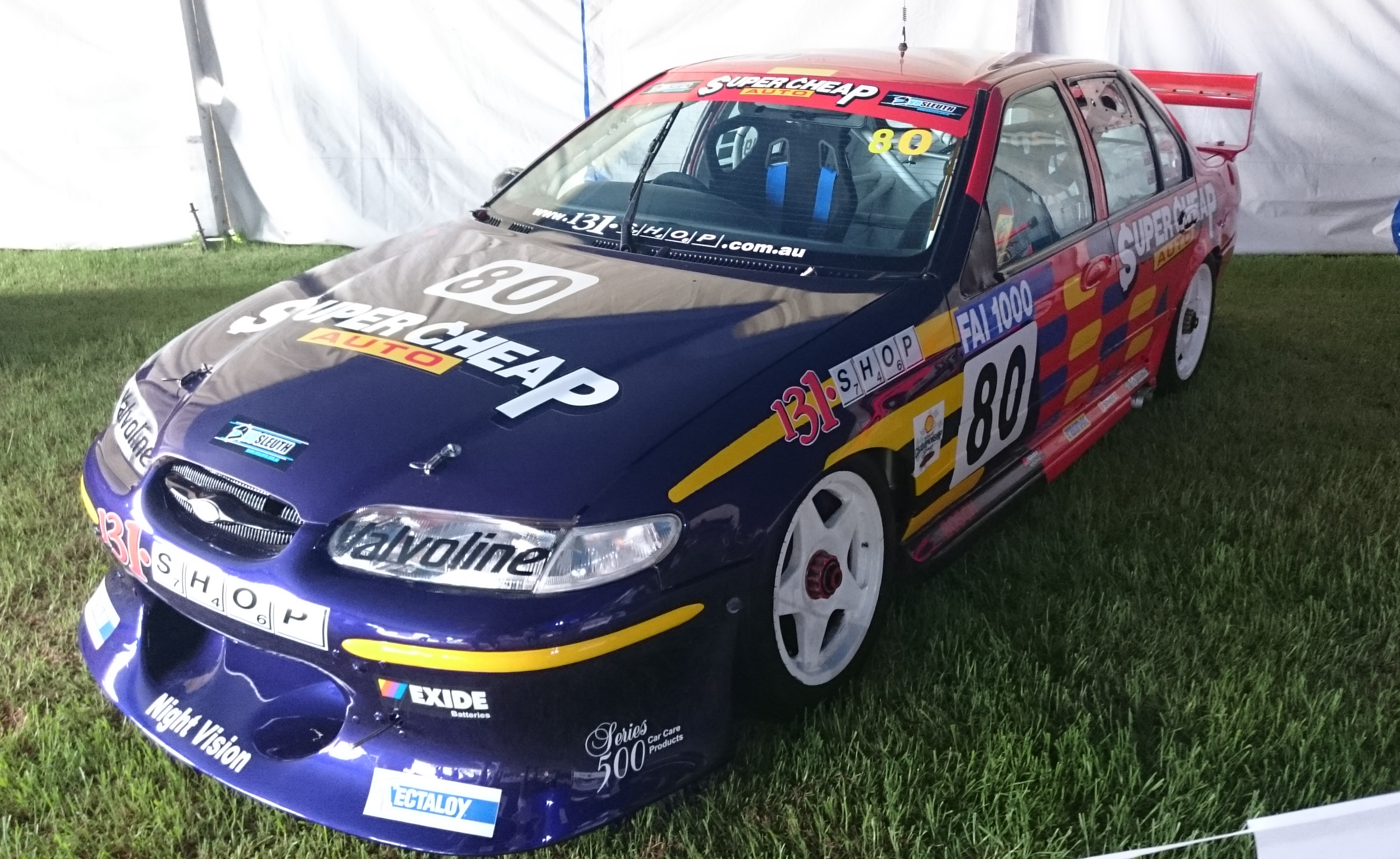
The Ford Falcon EL in which Bob Thorn and Todd Wanless contested the race. It is pictured in 2018 in its 1999 colours.

Pos.	No.	Driver	Team	Car	Time	Gap	Grid
1	5	(Australia) Glenn Seton (Australia) Neil Crompton	Glenn Seton Racing	Ford Falcon AU	2:10.2560		Top 10
2	18	(New Zealand) Paul Radisich (Australia) Steve Ellery	Dick Johnson Racing	Ford Falcon AU	2:10.4088	+0.1528	Top 10
3	600	(Australia) John Bowe (New Zealand) Jim Richards	PAE Motorsport	Ford Falcon AU	2:10.4368	+0.1808	Top 10
4	10	(Australia) Mark Larkham (Australia) Brad Jones	Larkham Motor Sport	Ford Falcon AU	2:10.5931	+0.3371	Top 10
5	2	(Australia) Mark Skaife (Australia) Paul Morris	Holden Racing Team	Holden Commodore VT	2:10.6544	+0.3984	Top 10
6	34	(Australia) Garth Tander (Australia) Jason Bargwanna	Garry Rogers Motorsport	Holden Commodore VT	2:10.9809	+0.7249	Top 10
7	11	(Australia) Larry Perkins (Australia) Russell Ingall	Perkins Engineering	Holden Commodore VT	2:10.9889	+0.7329	Top 10
8	1	(Australia) Craig Lowndes (Australia) Cameron McConville	Holden Racing Team	Holden Commodore VT	2:11.1934	+0.9372	Top 10
9	4	(Australia) Jason Bright (New Zealand) Craig Baird	Stone Brothers Racing	Ford Falcon AU	2:11.2173	+0.9613	Top 10
10	17	(Australia) Dick Johnson (Australia) Steven Johnson	Dick Johnson Racing	Ford Falcon AU	2:11.2316	+0.9756	Top 10
11	46	(New Zealand) John Faulkner (New Zealand) Simon Wills	John Faulkner Racing	Holden Commodore VT	2:11.2497	+0.9937	11
12	7	(New Zealand) Greg Murphy (New Zealand) Steven Richards	Gibson Motorsport	Holden Commodore VT	2:11.4005	+1.1445	12
13	32	(Australia) Tomas Mezera (Australia) Tony Ricciardello	Tomas Mezera Motorsport	Holden Commodore VT	2:11.4793	+1.2233	13
14	25	(Australia) Tony Longhurst (Australia) Adam Macrow	Longhurst Racing	Ford Falcon AU	2:11.4940	+1.2380	14
15	40	(Australia) Cameron McLean (United Kingdom) John Cleland	Greenfield Mowers Racing	Ford Falcon EL	2:11.6708	+1.4148	15
16	66	(Australia) Mark Poole (Australia) Tony Scott	James Rosenberg Racing	Holden Commodore VT	2:11.7586	+1.5026	16
17	19	(Australia) Wayne Gardner (Australia) David Brabham	Wayne Gardner Racing	Holden Commodore VT	2:12.2775	+2.0215	17
18	43	(Australia) Paul Weel (Australia) Greg Crick	Paul Weel Racing	Ford Falcon AU	2:12.3802	+2.1242	18
19	15	(Australia) Todd Kelly (Australia) Mark Noske	Holden Young Lions	Holden Commodore VT	2:12.4370	+2.1810	19
20	6	(Australia) Geoff Brabham (Australia) Neal Bates	Glenn Seton Racing	Ford Falcon AU	2:12.6669	+2.4109	20
21	24	(Australia) Paul Romano (Australia) Darren Hossack	Romano Racing	Holden Commodore VS	2:13.1752	+2.9192	21
22	75	(Australia) Anthony Tratt (Australia) Alan Jones	Paul Little Racing	Ford Falcon AU	2:13.5645	+3.3085	22
23	3	(Australia) Steve Reed (Australia) Trevor Ashby	Lansvale Smash Repairs	Holden Commodore VS	2:13.6995	+3.4435	23
24	16	(Australia) Dugal McDougall (Australia) Andrew Miedecke	McDougall Motorsport	Holden Commodore VT	2:13.8774	+3.6214	24
25	26	(Australia) Peter Doulman (Australia) John Cotter	Doulman Automotive	Holden Commodore VT	2:14.1123	+3.8563	25
26	27	(Australia) Terry Finnigan (Australia) Darren Pate	Terry Finnigan	Holden Commodore VS	2:14.5386	+4.2826	26
27	54	(Australia) Simon Emerzidis (Australia) Garry Willmington	Emerzidis Motorsport	Ford Falcon EL	2:14.6472	+4.3912	27
28	28	(Australia) Rodney Forbes (Australia) Geoff Full	Bob Forbes Racing	Holden Commodore VS	2:14.7409	+4.4849	28
29	35	(Australia) Greg Ritter (Australia) Steve Owen	Garry Rogers Motorsport	Holden Commodore VT	2:14.7595	+4.5035	29
30	134	(Australia) Alan Heath (Australia) Mick Donaher	Power Racing	Ford Falcon EL	2:14.8458	+4.5898	30
31	39	(Australia) Chris Smerdon (Australia) Charlie Cox	Challenge Motorsport	Holden Commodore VS	2:15.0589	+4.8029	31
32	30	(Australia) Craig Harris (Australia) Tim Shaw	Harris Racing	Ford Falcon EL	2:15.2347	+4.9787	32
33	97	(Australia) Wayne Wakefield (Australia) Dean Canto	Graphic Skills Racing	Holden Commodore VS	2:15.3284	+5.0724	33
34	96	(Australia) Matthew White (Australia) Paul Dumbrell	John Faulkner Racing	Holden Commodore VS	2:16.1421	+5.8861	34
35	87	(Australia) Damien White (Australia) Rod Salmon	Rod Salmon Racing	Holden Commodore VS	2:16.2008	+5.9448	35
36	80	(Australia) Bob Thorn (Australia) Todd Wanless	Briggs Motor Sport	Ford Falcon EL	2:16.8581	+6.6021	36
37	14	(Australia) Mike Imrie (Australia) Rodney Crick	Imrie Motorsport	Holden Commodore VS	2:16.9780	+6.7220	37
38	47	(Australia) John Trimbole (Australia) Kevin Heffernan	Daily Planet Racing	Holden Commodore VS	2:17.0056	+6.7496	38
39	70	(Australia) John Briggs (Australia) Tim Leahey	Briggs Motor Sport	Ford Falcon AU	2:17.2675	+7.0115	39
40	41	(Australia) Bill Sieders (Australia) Garry Holt	Emerzidis Motorsport	Ford Falcon EL	2:17.2896	+7.0336	40
41	22	(Australia) Danny Osborne (Australia) Brett Peters	Colourscan Racing	Ford Falcon AU	2:17.4485	+7.1925	41
42	55	(Australia) Rod Nash (Australia) Dean Wanless	Rod Nash Racing	Holden Commodore VT	2:17.4698	+7.2138	42
43	48	(Australia) D'Arcy Russell (Australia) Grant Johnson	Rod Smith Racing	Holden Commodore VS	2:17.5601	+7.3041	43
44	79	(Australia) Mike Conway (Australia) Ric Shaw	Cadillac Productions	Ford Falcon EL	2:18.1570	+7.9010	44
45	36	(Australia) Neil Schembri (Australia) Gary Quartly	Schembri Motorsport	Holden Commodore VS	2:18.1884	+7.9324	45
46	84	(Australia) Daniel Miller (Australia) Geoff Kendrick	Miller Racing	Holden Commodore VS	2:20.0793	+9.8233	46
47	42	(Australia) Mark Williams (Australia) Scott Fleming	Colourscan Racing	Ford Falcon EL	2:21.5128	+11.2568	47
48	50	(Australia) Dean Lindstrom (Australia) Melinda Price	Clive Wiseman Racing	Holden Commodore VS	2:21.6840	+11.4280	48
49	37	(Australia) Alan Taylor (Australia) Bill Attard	Alan Taylor Racing	Holden Commodore VS	2:23.6365	+13.3805	49
50	81	(Australia) Tim Rowse (Australia) Ron Barnacle	Rowse Motorsport	Holden Commodore VP	2:24.4066	+14.1506	50
51	77	(Australia) Richard Mork (Australia) Christian D'Agostin	V8 Racing	Holden Commodore VS	2:25.2048	+14.9488	51
52	38	(Australia) Peter Field (Australia) Shane Howison	South Pacific Motor Racing	Holden Commodore VS	2:35.8070	+25.5510	52
53	60	(Australia) Nathan Pretty (New Zealand) Andrew Fawcet	Pretty Motorsport	Holden Commodore VS	2:44.9172	+34.6612	53
54	73	(Australia) David Parsons (Australia) David Parsons	Gibson Motorsport	Holden Commodore VT	No time		54
55	49	(Australia) Layton Crambrook (Australia) Dean Crosswell	Crambrook Racing	Holden Commodore VS	No time		55
WD	33	(Australia) Phil Ward (Australia) Allan McCarthy	Pro-Duct Motorsport	Holden Commodore VS	No time		DNQ
WD	98	(Australia) Barry Cassidy (Australia) Neil Crowe	Owen Parkinson Racing	Holden Commodore VS	No time		DNPQ

=== Top ten shootout ===
Pos	No	Driver	Team	Car	Time
1	10	(Australia) Mark Larkham	Larkham Motor Sport	Ford Falcon AU	2:09.5146
2	2	(Australia) Mark Skaife	Holden Racing Team	Holden Commodore VT	2:09.5792
3	1	(Australia) Craig Lowndes	Holden Racing Team	Holden Commodore VT	2:09.9063
4	18	(New Zealand) Paul Radisich	Dick Johnson Racing	Ford Falcon AU	2:10.0001
5	11	(Australia) Larry Perkins	Perkins Engineering	Holden Commodore VT	2:10.3407
6	4	(Australia) Jason Bright	Stone Brothers Racing	Ford Falcon AU	2:10.4267
7	5	(Australia) Glenn Seton	Glenn Seton Racing	Ford Falcon AU	2:10.7096
8	600	(Australia) John Bowe	PAE Motorsport	Ford Falcon AU	2:11.6960
9	34	(Australia) Garth Tander	Garry Rogers Motorsport	Holden Commodore VT	2:11.7665
10	17	(Australia) Dick Johnson	Dick Johnson Racing	Ford Falcon AU	2:11.8516

=== Starting grid ===
Inside row					Outside row				
1	(Australia) Mark Larkham (Australia) Brad Jones	10			2	(Australia) Mark Skaife (Australia) Paul Morris			2
1	Larkham Motor Sport (Ford Falcon AU)				Holden Racing Team (Holden Commodore VT)				2
3			(Australia) Craig Lowndes (Australia) Cameron McConville	1			18	(New Zealand) Paul Radisich (Australia) Steve Ellery	4
3			Holden Racing Team (Holden Commodore VT)				Dick Johnson Racing (Ford Falcon AU)		4
5	(Australia) Larry Perkins (Australia) Russell Ingall	11			4	(Australia) Jason Bright (New Zealand) Craig Baird			6
5	Perkins Engineering (Holden Commodore VT)				Stone Brothers Racing (Ford Falcon AU)				6
7			(Australia) Glenn Seton (Australia) Neil Crompton	5			600	(Australia) John Bowe (New Zealand) Jim Richards	8
7			Glenn Seton Racing (Ford Falcon AU)				PAE Motorsport (Ford Falcon AU)		8
9	(Australia) Garth Tander (Australia) Jason Bargwanna	34			17	(Australia) Dick Johnson (Australia) Steven Johnson			10
9	Garry Rogers Motorsport (Holden Commodore VT)				Dick Johnson Racing (Ford Falcon AU)				10
11			(New Zealand) John Faulkner (New Zealand) Simon Wills	46			7	(New Zealand) Greg Murphy (New Zealand) Steven Richards	12
11			John Faulkner Racing (Holden Commodore VT)				Gibson Motorsport (Holden Commodore VT)		12
13	(Australia) Tomas Mezera (Australia) Tony Ricciardello	32			25	(Australia) Tony Longhurst (Australia) Adam Macrow			14
13	Tomas Mezera Motorsport (Holden Commodore VT)				Longhurst Racing (Ford Falcon AU)				14
15			(Australia) Cameron McLean (United Kingdom) John Cleland	40			66	(Australia) Mark Poole (Australia) Tony Scott	16
15			Greenfield Mowers Racing (Ford Falcon EL)				James Rosenberg Racing (Holden Commodore VT)		16
17	(Australia) Wayne Gardner (Australia) David Brabham	19			43	(Australia) Paul Weel (Australia) Greg Crick			18
17	Wayne Gardner Racing (Holden Commodore VT)				Paul Weel Racing (Ford Falcon AU)				18
19			(Australia) Todd Kelly (Australia) Mark Noske	15			6	(Australia) Geoff Brabham (Australia) Neal Bates	20
19			Holden Young Lions (Holden Commodore VT)				Glenn Seton Racing (Ford Falcon AU)		20
21	(Australia) Paul Romano (Australia) Darren Hossack	24			75	(Australia) Anthony Tratt (Australia) Alan Jones			22
21	Romano Racing (Holden Commodore VS)				Paul Little Racing (Ford Falcon AU)				22
23			(Australia) Steve Reed (Australia) Trevor Ashby	3			16	(Australia) Dugal McDougall (Australia) Andrew Miedecke	24
23			Lansvale Smash Repairs (Holden Commodore VS)				McDougall Motorsport (Holden Commodore VT)		24
25	(Australia) Peter Doulman (Australia) John Cotter	26			27	(Australia) Terry Finnigan (Australia) Darren Pate			26
25	Doulman Automotive (Holden Commodore VT)				Terry Finnigan (Holden Commodore VS)				26
27			(Australia) Simon Emerzidis (Australia) Garry Willmington	54			28	(Australia) Rodney Forbes (Australia) Geoff Full	28
27			Emerzidis Motorsport (Ford Falcon EL)				Bob Forbes Racing (Holden Commodore VS)		28
29	(Australia) Greg Ritter (Australia) Steve Owen	35			134	(Australia) Alan Heath (Australia) Mick Donaher			30
29	Garry Rogers Motorsport (Holden Commodore VT)				Power Racing (Ford Falcon EL)				30
31			(Australia) Charlie Cox (Australia) Chris Smerdon	39			30	(Australia) Craig Harris (Australia) Tim Shaw	32
31			Challenge Motorsport (Holden Commodore VS)				Harris Racing (Ford Falcon EL)		32
33	(Australia) Wayne Wakefield (Australia) Dean Canto	97			96	(Australia) Matthew White (Australia) Paul Dumbrell			34
33	Graphic Skills Racing (Holden Commodore VS)				John Faulkner Racing (Holden Commodore VS)				34
35			(Australia) Damien White (Australia) Rod Salmon	87			80	(Australia) Bob Thorn (Australia) Todd Wanless	36
35			Rod Salmon Racing (Holden Commodore VS)				Briggs Motor Sport (Ford Falcon EL)		36
37	(Australia) Mike Imrie (Australia) Rodney Crick	14			47	(Australia) John Trimbole (Australia) Kevin Heffernan			38
37	Imrie Motorsport (Holden Commodore VS)				Daily Planet Racing (Holden Commodore VS)				38
39			(Australia) John Briggs (Australia) Tim Leahey	70			41	(Australia) Garry Holt (Australia) Bill Sieders	40
39			Briggs Motor Sport (Ford Falcon AU)				Emerzidis Motorsport (Ford Falcon EL)		40
41	(Australia) Danny Osborne (Australia) Brett Peters	22			55	(Australia) Rod Nash (Australia) Dean Wanless			42
41	Colourscan Racing (Ford Falcon AU)				Rod Nash Racing (Holden Commodore VT)				42
43			(Australia) D'Arcy Russell (Australia) Grant Johnson	48			79	(Australia) Mike Conway (Australia) Ric Shaw	44
43			Rod Smith Racing (Holden Commodore VS)				Cadillac Productions (Ford Falcon EL)		44
45	(Australia) Neil Schembri (Australia) Gary Quartly	36			84	(Australia) Daniel Miller (Australia) Geoff Kendrick			46
45	Schembri Motorsport (Holden Commodore VS)				Miller Racing (Holden Commodore VS)				46
47			(Australia) Scott Fleming (Australia) Mark Williams	42			50	(Australia) Dean Lindstrom (Australia) Melinda Price	48
47			Colourscan Racing (Ford Falcon EL)				Clive Wiseman Racing (Holden Commodore VS)		48
49	(Australia) Alan Taylor (Australia) Bill Attard	37			81	(Australia) Tim Rowse (Australia) Ron Barnacle			50
49	Alan Taylor Racing (Holden Commodore VS)				Rowse Motorsport (Holden Commodore VP)				50
51			(Australia) Richard Mork (Australia) Christian D'Agostin	77			38	(Australia) Peter Field (Australia) Shane Howison	52
51			V8 Racing (Holden Commodore VS)				South Pacific Motor Racing (Holden Commodore VS)		52
53	(Australia) Nathan Pretty (New Zealand) Andrew Fawcet	60			73	(Australia) David Parsons (Australia) David Parsons			54
53	Pretty Motorsport (Holden Commodore VS)				Gibson Motorsport (Holden Commodore VT)				54
55			(Australia) Layton Crambrook (Australia) Dean Crosswell	49					
55			Crambrook Racing (Holden Commodore VS)						

=== Race ===
Pos	No	Drivers	Team	Car	Class	Laps	Time/Retired	Grid	Points
1	7	(New Zealand) Steven Richards (New Zealand) Greg Murphy	Gibson Motorsport	Holden Commodore VT	O	161	6:51:48.8354	12	300
2	1	(Australia) Craig Lowndes (Australia) Cameron McConville	Holden Racing Team	Holden Commodore VT	O	161	+25.3211	3	276
3	2	(Australia) Mark Skaife (Australia) Paul Morris	Holden Racing Team	Holden Commodore VT	O	161	+25.6529	2	264
4	17	(Australia) Dick Johnson (Australia) Steven Johnson	Dick Johnson Racing	Ford Falcon AU	O	161	+1:00.4060	10	252
5	5	(Australia) Glenn Seton (Australia) Neil Crompton	Glenn Seton Racing	Ford Falcon AU	O	161	+1:03.7613	7	240
6	15	(Australia) Todd Kelly (Australia) Mark Noske	Holden Young Lions	Holden Commodore VT	O	161	+1:34.9745	19	228
7	11	(Australia) Larry Perkins (Australia) Russell Ingall	Perkins Engineering	Holden Commodore VT	O	161	+1:50.9554	5	216
8	43	(Australia) Paul Weel (Australia) Greg Crick	Paul Weel Racing	Ford Falcon AU	O	160	+1 lap	18	204
9	35	(Australia) Greg Ritter (Australia) Steve Owen	Garry Rogers Motorsport	Holden Commodore VT	O	160	+1 lap	29	192
10	6	(Australia) Geoff Brabham (Australia) Neal Bates	Glenn Seton Racing	Ford Falcon AU	O	159	+2 laps	20	180
11	73	(Australia) David Parsons (Australia) David Parsons	Gibson Motorsport	Holden Commodore VT	O	159	+2 laps	54	168
12	28	(Australia) Rodney Forbes (Australia) Geoff Full	Bob Forbes Racing	Holden Commodore VS	P	158	+3 laps	28	156
13	24	(Australia) Paul Romano (Australia) Darren Hossack	Romano Racing	Holden Commodore VS	O	158	+3 laps	21	144
14	19	(Australia) Wayne Gardner (Australia) David Brabham	Wayne Gardner Racing	Holden Commodore VT	O	157	+4 laps	17	132
15	66	(Australia) Mark Poole (Australia) Tony Scott	James Rosenberg Racing	Holden Commodore VT	O	157	+4 laps	16	120
16	3	(Australia) Steve Reed (Australia) Trevor Ashby	Lansvale Smash Repairs	Holden Commodore VS	P	152	+9 laps	23	108
17	50	(Australia) Dean Lindstrom (Australia) Melinda Price	Clive Wiseman Racing	Holden Commodore VS	P	151	+10 laps	47	96
18	36	(Australia) Neil Schembri (Australia) Gary Quartly	Schembri Motorsport	Holden Commodore VS	P	146	+15 laps	44	84
19	48	(Australia) D'Arcy Russell (Australia) Grant Johnson	Rod Smith Racing	Holden Commodore VS	P	146	+15 laps	42	72
20	16	(Australia) Dugal McDougall (Australia) Andrew Miedecke	McDougall Motorsport	Holden Commodore VT	O	141	+20 laps	24	60
21	60	(Australia) Nathan Pretty (New Zealand) Andrew Fawcett	Pretty Motorsport	Holden Commodore VS	P	134	+27 laps	53	48
22	38	(Australia) Peter Field (Australia) Shane Howison	South Pacific Motor Racing	Holden Commodore VS	P	134	+27 laps	52	36
DNF	25	(Australia) Tony Longhurst (Australia) Adam Macrow	Longhurst Racing	Ford Falcon AU	O	150	Driveline	14	
DNF	18	(New Zealand) Paul Radisich (Australia) Steve Ellery	Dick Johnson Racing	Ford Falcon AU	O	147	Engine	4	
DNF	75	(Australia) Anthony Tratt (Australia) Alan Jones	Paul Little Racing	Ford Falcon AU	O	147	Alternator	22	
DNF	4	(Australia) Jason Bright (New Zealand) Craig Baird	Stone Brothers Racing	Ford Falcon AU	O	145	Axle	6	
DNF	40	(Australia) Cameron McLean (United Kingdom) John Cleland	Greenfield Mowers Racing	Ford Falcon EL	P	138	Crash	15	
DNF	39	(Australia) Chris Smerdon (Australia) Charlie Cox	Challenge Motorsport	Holden Commodore VS	P	122	Engine	31	
DNF	49	(Australia) Layton Crambrook (Australia) Dean Crosswell	Crambrook Racing	Holden Commodore VS	P	119	Mechanical	55	
DNF	70	(Australia) John Briggs (Australia) Tim Leahey	Briggs Motor Sport	Ford Falcon AU	O	116	Watts Linkage	39	
DNF	77	(Australia) Richard Mork (Australia) Christian D'Agostin	V8 Racing	Holden Commodore VS	P	115	Engine	51	
DNF	30	(Australia) Craig Harris (Australia) Tim Shaw	Harris Racing	Ford Falcon EL	P	108	Gearbox	32	
DNF	134	(Australia) Alan Heath (Australia) Mick Donaher	Power Racing	Ford Falcon EL	P	101	Overheating	30	
DNF	47	(Australia) John Trimbole (Australia) Kevin Heffernan	Daily Planet Racing	Holden Commodore VS	P	90	Wheel Bearing	38	
DNF	87	(Australia) Damien White (Australia) Rod Salmon	Rod Salmon Racing	Holden Commodore VS	P	83	Gearbox	35	
DNF	600	(Australia) John Bowe (New Zealand) Jim Richards	PAE Motorsport	Ford Falcon AU	O	82	Engine	8	
DNF	42	(Australia) Mark Williams (Australia) Scott Fleming	Colourscan Racing	Ford Falcon EL	P	78	Steering	46	
DNF	22	(Australia) Danny Osborne (Australia) Brett Peters	Colourscan Racing	Ford Falcon AU	O	70	Engine	40	
DNF	46	(New Zealand) John Faulkner (New Zealand) Simon Wills	John Faulkner Racing	Holden Commodore VT	O	65	Crash	11	
DNF	10	(Australia) Mark Larkham (Australia) Brad Jones	Larkham Motor Sport	Ford Falcon AU	O	62	Clutch	1	
DNF	55	(Australia) Rod Nash (Australia) Dean Wanless	Rod Nash Racing	Holden Commodore VT	P	61	Crash	41	
DNF	14	(Australia) Mike Imrie (Australia) Rodney Crick	Imrie Motorsport	Holden Commodore VS	P	53	Electrical	37	
DNF	97	(Australia) Wayne Wakefield (Australia) Dean Canto	Graphic Skills Racing	Holden Commodore VS	P	46	Crash	33	
DNF	27	(Australia) Terry Finnigan (Australia) Darren Pate	Finnigan Racing	Holden Commodore VS	P	46	Crash damage	26	
DNF	32	(Australia) Tomas Mezera (Australia) Tony Ricciardello	Tomas Mezera Motorsport	Holden Commodore VT	O	41	Crash	13	
DNF	34	(Australia) Garth Tander (Australia) Jason Bargwanna	Garry Rogers Motorsport	Holden Commodore VT	O	41	Crash	9	
DNF	79	(Australia) Mike Conway (Australia) Ric Shaw	Cadillac Productions	Ford Falcon EL	P	33	Engine	43	
DNF	84	(Australia) Daniel Miller (Australia) Geoff Kendrick	Miller Racing	Holden Commodore VS	P	27	Crash	PL	
DNF	80	(Australia) Bob Thorn (Australia) Todd Wanless	Briggs Motor Sport	Ford Falcon EL	P	19	Crash	36	
DNF	81	(Australia) Tim Rowse (Australia) Ron Barnacle	Rowse Motorsport	Holden Commodore VP	P	14	Overheating	50	
DNF	41	(Australia) Bill Sieders (Australia) Garry Holt	Emerzidis Motorsport	Ford Falcon EL	P	11	Engine	48	
DNF	96	(Australia) Paul Dumbrell (Australia) Matthew White	John Faulkner Racing	Holden Commodore VS	O	11	Crash	34	
DNF	54	(Australia) Simon Emerzidis (Australia) Garry Willmington	Emerzidis Motorsport	Ford Falcon EL	P	8	Accident damage	27	
DNF	37	(Australia) Alan Taylor (Australia) Bill Attard	Alan Taylor Racing	Holden Commodore VS	P	6	Engine	49	
DNF	26	(Australia) Peter Doulman (Australia) John Cotter	Doulman Automotive	Holden Commodore VT	P	4	Overheating	25	
DNS	33	(Australia) Phil Ward (Australia) Allan McCarthy	Phil Ward Racing	Holden Commodore VS	P		Crash in pre-qualifying		
WD	98	(Australia) Barry Cassidy (Australia) Neil Crowe	Owen Parkinson Racing	Holden Commodore VS	P				

== Broadcast ==
Network 10 broadcast the race for the third consecutive year, dating back to the 1997 5.0L race. Barry Sheene provided commentary in the booth for the first part of the race before moving to pit-lane for the remainder.

Network 10
Host: Bill Woods
Booth: Leigh Diffey, Mark Oastler, Barry Sheene
Pit-lane: Greg Rust

== Statistics ==
- Provisional Position – #5 Glenn Seton – 2:10.2560
- Pole Position – #10 Mark Larkham – 2:09.5146
- Fastest Lap – #18 Paul Radisich – 2:12.5624
- Average Speed – 145 km/h
