= 1999 V8 Supercars Eastern Creek round =

Auto race in New South Wales, Australia

(New South Wales) 1999 Eastern Creek V8 Supercar round
Event Information
- Round 1 of 13 in the 1999 Shell Championship Series
- Date: 26–28 March 1999
- Location: Eastern Creek, New South Wales
- Venue: Eastern Creek Raceway
- Weather: Fine

Results
Race 1
| Distance | 13 laps | 50 km |
| Pole position | Mark Skaife; Holden Racing Team | 1:30.6556 |
| Winner | Mark Skaife; Holden Racing Team | 20:08.3796 |
Race 2
| Distance | 13 laps | 50 km |
| Winner | Mark Skaife; Holden Racing Team | 20:10.9749 |
Race 3
| Distance | 9 laps | 30 km |
| Winner | Craig Lowndes; Holden Racing Team | 13:53.5105 |
Round Results
| First | Mark Skaife; Holden Racing Team | 146 pts |
| Second | Craig Lowndes; Holden Racing Team | 140 pts |
| Third | Garth Tander; Garry Rogers Motorsport | 128 pts |

The 1999 Eastern Creek V8 Supercar round was the first round of the 1999 Shell Championship Series. It was held from 26 to 28 March at Eastern Creek International Raceway in Sydney, New South Wales.

The opening round of the 1999 season would be dominated by the Holden Racing Team outfit with Mark Skaife claiming pole position and won the first two races en route to claiming overall round honours. Teammate and defending champion Craig Lowndes won the third race and finished second overall in points for the weekend. Garth Tander rounded out the overall podium.

== Background ==
The event was held on the weekend of 26 to 28 March 1999. It was the sixth ATCC/V8 Supercar event to be held at Eastern Creek International Raceway and consisted of three 50 km sprint races.

Having sponsored the series since 1993, this round was the first in which the series ran under the Shell Championship Series following a naming rights sponsorship agreement with Shell Australia.

After years of an ensuing tyre war, this round marked the first in the series history to see a control tyre used for the entire grid. All entrants were required to run Bridgestone tyres as a result.

=== Entry list ===
A total of 44 drivers entered the weekend with a grid capacity of 40 cars. This round saw the debut of the Holden VT Commodore and Ford XR8 AU Falcon chassis' primarily run by select drivers in the front-running teams. Most entrants would compete in either the Holden VS Commodore or Ford EL Falcon.

== Race results ==
=== Qualifying ===
Mark Skaife took pole position for the first race by four tenths over teammate Craig Lowndes and was the only driver to set a time in the 1 minute 30 second bracket.

Cameron McLean initially failed to qualify for the event due to an engine change. However, the Greenfield Mowers racer entered into an agreement with Richard Mork to cede his qualifying position to McLean and thus Mork was forced to sit out the first race. After the withdrawal of Todd Kelly preceding the second race, Mork was re-entered back into the event and was allowed to compete in the remaining two races.

| Pos | No | Name | Team | Vehicle | Time |
|---|---|---|---|---|---|
| 1 | 2 | (Australia) Mark Skaife | Holden Racing Team | Holden Commodore (VT) | 1:30.6556 |
| 2 | 1 | (Australia) Craig Lowndes | Holden Racing Team | Holden Commodore (VT) | 1:31.0781 |
| 3 | 5 | (Australia) Glenn Seton | Glenn Seton Racing | Ford Falcon (AU) | 1:31.2666 |
| 4 | 4 | (Australia) Jason Bright | Stone Brothers Racing | Ford Falcon (AU) | 1:31.2904 |
| 5 | 34 | (Australia) Garth Tander | Garry Rogers Motorsport | Holden Commodore (VT) | 1:31.4553 |
| 6 | 11 | (Australia) Larry Perkins | Perkins Engineering | Holden Commodore (VT) | 1:31.4683 |
| 7 | 35 | (Australia) Jason Bargwanna | Garry Rogers Motorsport | Holden Commodore (VT) | 1:31.4787 |
| 8 | 8 | (Australia) Russell Ingall | Perkins Engineering | Holden Commodore (VT) | 1:31.7573 |
| 9 | 25 | (Australia) Tony Longhurst | Longhurst Racing | Ford Falcon (AU) | 1:31.8193 |
| 10 | 10 | (Australia) Mark Larkham | Larkham Motorsport | Ford Falcon (AU) | 1:31.8237 |
| 11 | 18 | (New Zealand) Paul Radisich | Dick Johnson Racing | Ford Falcon (AU) | 1:32.0274 |
| 12 | 31 | (Australia) Steven Ellery | Steven Ellery Racing | Ford Falcon (EL) | 1:32.0283 |
| 13 | 600 | (Australia) John Bowe | PAE Motorsport | Ford Falcon (EL) | 1:32.0295 |
| 14 | 6 | (Australia) Neil Crompton | Glenn Seton Racing | Ford Falcon (EL) | 1:32.1645 |
| 15 | 7 | (New Zealand) Steven Richards | Gibson Motorsport | Holden Commodore (VT) | 1:32.1853 |
| 16 | 12 | (New Zealand) Greg Murphy | Gibson Motorsport | Holden Commodore (VT) | 1:32.3531 |
| 17 | 17 | (Australia) Dick Johnson | Dick Johnson Racing | Ford Falcon (AU) | 1:32.5782 |
| 18 | 24 | (Australia) Paul Romano | Romano Racing | Holden Commodore (VS) | 1:32.7169 |
| 19 | 46 | (New Zealand) John Faulkner | John Faulkner Racing | Holden Commodore (VT) | 1:32.7260 |
| 20 | 99 | (Australia) Mark Noske | Holden Young Lions | Holden Commodore (VS) | 1:32.7369 |
| 21 | 30 | (Australia) Greg Crick | Greg Crick Motorsport | Ford Falcon (EL) | 1:33.0975 |
| 22 | 28 | (Australia) Rodney Forbes | Bob Forbes Racing | Holden Commodore (VS) | 1:33.2135 |
| 23 | 3 | (Australia) Trevor Ashby | Lansvale Racing Team | Holden Commodore (VS) | 1:33.3729 |
| 24 | 15 | (Australia) Todd Kelly | Holden Young Lions | Holden Commodore (VS) | 1:33.5292 |
| 25 | 32 | (Australia) Tomas Mezera | Tomas Mezera Motorsport | Holden Commodore (VT) | 1:33.6144 |
| 26 | 27 | (Australia) Terry Finnigan | Terry Finnigan Racing | Holden Commodore (VS) | 1:33.7467 |
| 27 | 16 | (Australia) Dugal McDougall | McDougall Motorsport | Holden Commodore (VS) | 1:33.8565 |
| 28 | 50 | (Australia) Mick Donaher | Clive Wiseman Racing | Holden Commodore (VS) | 1:34.1022 |
| 29 | 55 | (Australia) Rod Nash | Rod Nash Racing | Holden Commodore (VS) | 1:34.3099 |
| 30 | 75 | (Australia) Anthony Tratt | Paul Little Racing | Ford Falcon (EL) | 1:34.3414 |
| 31 | 54 | (Australia) Simon Emerzidis | Simon Emerzidis Racing | Ford Falcon (EL) | 1:34.5784 |
| 32 | 72 | (Australia) David Parsons | Robert Smith Racing | Holden Commodore (VS) | 1:34.7508 |
| 33 | 22 | (Australia) Danny Osborne | Colourscan Motorsport | Ford Falcon (EL) | 1:35.1501 |
| 34 | 39 | (Australia) Chris Smerdon | Challenge Motorsport | Holden Commodore (VS) | 1:35.4810 |
| 35 | 79 | (Australia) Mike Conway | Cadillac Productions | Ford Falcon (EL) | 1:35.5506 |
| 36 | 26 | (Australia) John Cotter | Doulman Automotive | Holden Commodore (VS) | 1:35.7770 |
| 37 | 40 | (Australia) Cameron McLean | Greenfield Mowers Racing | Ford Falcon (EL) | 1:36.2352 |
| 38 | 80 | (Australia) Bob Thorn | Briggs Motorsport | Ford Falcon (AU) | 1:36.6523 |
| 39 | 37 | (Australia) Bill Attard | Alan Taylor Racing | Holden Commodore (VS) | 1:36.9707 |
| 40 | 52 | (Australia) Barry Morcom | Barry Morcom Racing | Holden Commodore (VS) | 1:37.3086 |
Did not qualify: Circuit capacity (40 cars)
| 41 | 77 | (Australia) Richard Mork | V8 Racing | Holden Commodore (VR) | time withdrawn |
| - | 43 | (Australia) Paul Weel | Paul Weel Racing | Ford Falcon (AU) | no time |
| - | 51 | (Australia) Charles Ryman | Charles Ryman Racing | Ford Falcon (EL) | no time |
| - | 96 | (Australia) Paul Dumbrell | John Faulkner Racing | Holden Commodore (VT) | no time |

=== Privateers Race ===
| Pos. | No. | Name | Team | Vehicle | Laps | Time | Grid |
|---|---|---|---|---|---|---|---|
| 1 | 28 | (Australia) Rodney Forbes | Bob Forbes Racing | Holden Commodore (VS) | 8 | 12min 40.2488sec | 1 |
| 2 | 40 | (Australia) Cameron McLean | Greenfield Mowers Racing | Ford Falcon (EL) | 8 | + 0.533 | 15 |
| 3 | 50 | (Australia) Michael Donaher | Clive Wiseman Racing | Holden Commodore (VS) | 8 | + 8.647 | 4 |
| 4 | 3 | (Australia) Trevor Ashby | Lansvale Racing Team | Holden Commodore (VS) | 8 | + 11.791 | 2 |
| 5 | 39 | (Australia) Chris Smerdon | Challenge Motorsport | Holden Commodore (VS) | 8 | + 22.265 | 8 |
| 6 | 26 | (Australia) John Cotter | M3 Motorsport | Holden Commodore (VS) | 8 | + 28.261 | 10 |
| 7 | 52 | (Australia) Barry Morcom | Barry Morcom Racing | Holden Commodore (VS) | 8 | + 35.094 | 14 |
| 8 | 77 | (Australia) Richard Mork | V8 Racing | Holden Commodore (VR) | 8 | + 36.030 | 11 |
| 9 | 80 | (Australia) Bob Thorn | Briggs Motorsport | Ford Falcon (AU) | 8 | + 36.377 | 12 |
| 10 | 55 | (Australia) Rod Nash | Rod Nash Racing | Holden Commodore (VS) | 8 | + 38.134 | 5 |
| 11 | 37 | (Australia) Bill Attard | Scotty Taylor Racing | Holden Commodore (VS) | 8 | + 39.868 | 13 |
| 12 | 79 | (Australia) Mike Conway | Cadillac Productions | Ford Falcon (EL) | 8 | + 48.774 | 9 |
| 13 | 54 | (Australia) Simon Emerzidis | Simon Emerzidis Racing | Ford Falcon (EL) | 8 | + 1:02.554 | 6 |
| 14 | 72 | (Australia) David Parsons | Robert Smith Racing | Holden Commodore (VS) | 7 | + 1 lap | 7 |
| Ret | 27 | (Australia) Terry Finnigan | Terry Finnigan Racing | Holden Commodore (VS) | 6 | Retired | 3 |
Fastest Lap: Cameron McLean (Greenfield Mowers Racing), 1:33.0613

=== Race 1 ===
| Pos. | No. | Name | Team | Vehicle | Laps | Time | Grid |
|---|---|---|---|---|---|---|---|
| 1 | 2 | (Australia) Mark Skaife | Holden Racing Team | Holden Commodore (VT) | 13 | 20min 08.3796sec | 1 |
| 2 | 4 | (Australia) Jason Bright | Stone Brothers Racing | Ford Falcon (AU) | 13 | + 0.521 | 4 |
| 3 | 1 | (Australia) Craig Lowndes | Holden Racing Team | Holden Commodore (VT) | 13 | + 3.678 | 2 |
| 4 | 34 | (Australia) Garth Tander | Garry Rogers Motorsport | Holden Commodore (VS) | 13 | + 5.154 | 5 |
| 5 | 5 | (Australia) Glenn Seton | Glenn Seton Racing | Ford Falcon (AU) | 13 | + 5.259 | 3 |
| 6 | 11 | (Australia) Larry Perkins | Perkins Engineering | Holden Commodore (VT) | 13 | + 13.686 | 6 |
| 7 | 25 | (Australia) Tony Longhurst | Longhurst Racing | Ford Falcon (AU) | 13 | + 14.852 | 9 |
| 8 | 35 | (Australia) Jason Bargwanna | Garry Rogers Motorsport | Holden Commodore (VT) | 13 | + 15.385 | 7 |
| 9 | 8 | (Australia) Russell Ingall | Perkins Engineering | Holden Commodore (VT) | 13 | + 15.650 | 8 |
| 10 | 31 | (Australia) Steven Ellery | Steven Ellery Racing | Ford Falcon (EL) | 13 | + 16.184 | 12 |
| 11 | 7 | (New Zealand) Steven Richards | Gibson Motorsport | Holden Commodore (VT) | 13 | + 16.459 | 15 |
| 12 | 600 | (Australia) John Bowe | PAE Motorsport | Ford Falcon (EL) | 13 | + 17.642 | 13 |
| 13 | 12 | (New Zealand) Greg Murphy | Gibson Motorsport | Holden Commodore (VT) | 13 | + 17.739 | 16 |
| 14 | 10 | (Australia) Mark Larkham | Larkham Motorsport | Ford Falcon (AU) | 13 | + 19.675 | 10 |
| 15 | 99 | (Australia) Mark Noske | Holden Young Lions | Holden Commodore (VS) | 13 | + 21.095 | 20 |
| 16 | 17 | (Australia) Dick Johnson | Dick Johnson Racing | Ford Falcon (AU) | 13 | + 24.139 | 17 |
| 17 | 27 | (Australia) Terry Finnigan | Terry Finnigan Racing | Holden Commodore (VS) | 13 | + 33.996 | 26 |
| 18 | 32 | (Australia) Tomas Mezera | Tomas Mezera Motorsport | Holden Commodore (VT) | 13 | + 43.418 | 25 |
| 19 | 3 | (Australia) Trevor Ashby | Lansvale Racing Team | Holden Commodore (VS) | 13 | + 48.637 | 23 |
| 20 | 16 | (Australia) Dugal McDougall | McDougall Motorsport | Holden Commodore (VS) | 13 | + 51.064 | 27 |
| 21 | 50 | (Australia) Michael Donaher | Clive Wiseman Racing | Holden Commodore (VS) | 13 | + 51.321 | 28 |
| 22 | 24 | (Australia) Paul Romano | Romano Racing | Holden Commodore (VS) | 13 | + 52.714 | 18 |
| 23 | 72 | (Australia) David Parsons | Robert Smith Racing | Holden Commodore (VS) | 13 | + 53.708 | 32 |
| 24 | 39 | (Australia) Chris Smerdon | Challenge Motorsport | Holden Commodore (VS) | 13 | + 54.833 | 34 |
| 25 | 30 | (Australia) Greg Crick | Greg Crick Motorsport | Ford Falcon (EL) | 13 | + 58.593 | 21 |
| 26 | 75 | (Australia) Anthony Tratt | Paul Little Racing | Ford Falcon (EL) | 13 | + 1:07.295 | 30 |
| 27 | 55 | (Australia) Rod Nash | Rod Nash Racing | Holden Commodore (VS) | 13 | + 1:07.671 | 29 |
| 28 | 80 | (Australia) Bob Thorn | Briggs Motorsport | Ford Falcon (AU) | 13 | + 1:07.962 | 38 |
| 29 | 54 | (Australia) Simon Emerzidis | Simon Emerzidis Racing | Ford Falcon (EL) | 13 | + 1:08.707 | 31 |
| 30 | 79 | (Australia) Mike Conway | Cadillac Productions | Ford Falcon (EL) | 13 | + 1:14.861 | 35 |
| 31 | 37 | (Australia) Bill Attard | Scotty Taylor Racing | Holden Commodore (VS) | 13 | + 1:19.488 | 39 |
| 32 | 26 | (Australia) John Cotter | M3 Motorsport | Holden Commodore (VS) | 12 | + 1 lap | 36 |
| 33 | 52 | (Australia) Barry Morcom | Barry Morcom Racing | Holden Commodore (VS) | 12 | + 1 lap | 40 |
| 34 | 46 | (New Zealand) John Faulkner | John Faulkner Racing | Holden Commodore (VT) | 10 | + 3 laps | 19 |
| Ret | 6 | (Australia) Neil Crompton | Glenn Seton Racing | Ford Falcon (EL) | 10 | Retired | 14 |
| Ret | 28 | (Australia) Rodney Forbes | Bob Forbes Racing | Holden Commodore (VS) | 8 | Collision | 22 |
| Ret | 40 | (Australia) Cameron McLean | Greenfield Mowers Racing | Ford Falcon (EL) | 8 | Collision | 41 |
| Ret | 18 | (New Zealand) Paul Radisich | Dick Johnson Racing | Ford Falcon (AU) | 8 | Overheating | 11 |
| Ret | 22 | (Australia) Danny Osbourne | Colourscan Motorsport | Ford Falcon (EL) | 4 | Retired | 33 |
| Ret | 15 | (Australia) Todd Kelly | Holden Young Lions | Holden Commodore (VS) | 3 | Accident | 24 |
| DNS | 43 | (Australia) Paul Weel | Paul Weel Racing | Ford Falcon (AU) | | Did not start | |
| DNS | 51 | (Australia) Charles Ryman | Charles Ryman Racing | Ford Falcon (EL) | | Did not start | |
| DNS | 96 | (Australia) Paul Dumbrell | John Faulkner Racing | Holden Commodore (VS) | | Did not start | |
| DNQ | 77 | (Australia) Richard Mork | V8 Racing | Holden Commodore (VS) | | Did not qualify | |
Fastest Lap: Mark Skaife (Holden Racing Team), 1:31.8943

=== Race 2 ===
| Pos. | No. | Name | Team | Vehicle | Laps | Time | Grid |
|---|---|---|---|---|---|---|---|
| 1 | 2 | (Australia) Mark Skaife | Holden Racing Team | Holden Commodore (VT) | 13 | 20min 10.9749sec | 1 |
| 2 | 1 | (Australia) Craig Lowndes | Holden Racing Team | Holden Commodore (VT) | 13 | + 3.424 | 3 |
| 3 | 11 | (Australia) Larry Perkins | Perkins Engineering | Holden Commodore (VT) | 13 | + 5.457 | 6 |
| 4 | 34 | (Australia) Garth Tander | Garry Rogers Motorsport | Holden Commodore (VS) | 13 | + 5.755 | 4 |
| 5 | 35 | (Australia) Jason Bargwanna | Garry Rogers Motorsport | Holden Commodore (VT) | 13 | + 6.338 | 8 |
| 6 | 4 | (Australia) Jason Bright | Stone Brothers Racing | Ford Falcon (AU) | 13 | + 6.920 | 2 |
| 7 | 5 | (Australia) Glenn Seton | Glenn Seton Racing | Ford Falcon (AU) | 13 | + 7.095 | 5 |
| 8 | 8 | (Australia) Russell Ingall | Perkins Engineering | Holden Commodore (VT) | 13 | + 11.978 | 9 |
| 9 | 12 | (New Zealand) Greg Murphy | Gibson Motorsport | Holden Commodore (VT) | 13 | + 13.371 | 13 |
| 10 | 25 | (Australia) Tony Longhurst | Longhurst Racing | Ford Falcon (AU) | 13 | + 15.390 | 7 |
| 11 | 99 | (Australia) Mark Noske | Holden Young Lions | Holden Commodore (VS) | 13 | + 15.545 | 15 |
| 12 | 46 | (New Zealand) John Faulkner | John Faulkner Racing | Holden Commodore (VT) | 13 | + 25.209 | 34 |
| 13 | 16 | (Australia) Dugal McDougall | McDougall Motorsport | Holden Commodore (VS) | 13 | + 26.684 | 20 |
| 14 | 32 | (Australia) Tomas Mezera | Tomas Mezera Motorsport | Holden Commodore (VT) | 13 | + 28.750 | 18 |
| 15 | 18 | (New Zealand) Paul Radisich | Dick Johnson Racing | Ford Falcon (AU) | 13 | + 28.933 | 38 |
| 16 | 28 | (Australia) Rodney Forbes | Bob Forbes Racing | Holden Commodore (VS) | 13 | + 29.862 | 36 |
| 17 | 40 | (Australia) Cameron McLean | Greenfield Mowers Racing | Ford Falcon (EL) | 13 | + 29.952 | 37 |
| 18 | 24 | (Australia) Paul Romano | Romano Racing | Holden Commodore (VS) | 13 | + 30.791 | 22 |
| 19 | 3 | (Australia) Trevor Ashby | Lansvale Racing Team | Holden Commodore (VS) | 13 | + 30.988 | 19 |
| 20 | 30 | (Australia) Greg Crick | Greg Crick Motorsport | Ford Falcon (EL) | 13 | + 31.444 | 25 |
| 21 | 31 | (Australia) Steven Ellery | Steven Ellery Racing | Ford Falcon (EL) | 13 | + 32.209 | 10 |
| 22 | 27 | (Australia) Terry Finnigan | Terry Finnigan Racing | Holden Commodore (VS) | 13 | + 37.787 | 17 |
| 23 | 50 | (Australia) Michael Donaher | Clive Wiseman Racing | Holden Commodore (VS) | 13 | + 38.193 | 21 |
| 24 | 17 | (Australia) Dick Johnson | Dick Johnson Racing | Ford Falcon (AU) | 13 | + 44.600 | 16 |
| 25 | 72 | (Australia) David Parsons | Robert Smith Racing | Holden Commodore (VS) | 13 | + 46.427 | 23 |
| 26 | 10 | (Australia) Mark Larkham | Larkham Motorsport | Ford Falcon (AU) | 13 | + 1:02.064 | 14 |
| 27 | 75 | (Australia) Anthony Tratt | Paul Little Racing | Ford Falcon (EL) | 13 | + 1:03.592 | 26 |
| 28 | 79 | (Australia) Mike Conway | Cadillac Productions | Ford Falcon (EL) | 13 | + 1:06.111 | 30 |
| 29 | 80 | (Australia) Bob Thorn | Briggs Motorsport | Ford Falcon (AU) | 13 | + 1:07.239 | 28 |
| 30 | 37 | (Australia) Bill Attard | Scotty Taylor Racing | Holden Commodore (VS) | 13 | + 1:26.805 | 31 |
| 31 | 77 | (Australia) Richard Mork | V8 Racing | Holden Commodore (VS) | 13 | + 1:32.066 s | 39 |
| 32 | 52 | (Australia) Barry Morcom | Barry Morcom Racing | Holden Commodore (VS) | 12 | + 1 lap | 33 |
| NC | 39 | (Australia) Chris Smerdon | Challenge Motorsport | Holden Commodore (VS) | 4 | Not Classified | 24 |
| Ret | 6 | (Australia) Neil Crompton | Glenn Seton Racing | Ford Falcon (EL) | 8 | Spun Off | 35 |
| Ret | 54 | (Australia) Simon Emerzidis | Simon Emerzidis Racing | Ford Falcon (EL) | 7 | Spun Off | 24 |
| Ret | 26 | (Australia) John Cotter | M3 Motorsport | Holden Commodore (VS) | 3 | Retired | 32 |
| Ret | 600 | (Australia) John Bowe | PAE Motorsport | Ford Falcon (EL) | 1 | Water pump | 12 |
| Ret | 7 | (New Zealand) Steven Richards | Gibson Motorsport | Holden Commodore (VT) | 0 | Retired | 11 |
| Ret | 55 | (Australia) Rod Nash | Rod Nash Racing | Holden Commodore (VS) | 0 | Accident | 27 |
| DNS | 15 | (Australia) Todd Kelly | Holden Young Lions | Holden Commodore (VS) | | Did not start | |
| DNS | 22 | (Australia) Danny Osbourne | Colourscan Motorsport | Ford Falcon (EL) | | Did not start | |
| DNS | 43 | (Australia) Paul Weel | Paul Weel Racing | Ford Falcon (AU) | | Did not start | |
| DNS | 51 | (Australia) Charles Ryman | Charles Ryman Racing | Ford Falcon (EL) | | Did not start | |
| DNS | 96 | (Australia) Paul Dumbrell | John Faulkner Racing | Holden Commodore (VS) | | Did not start | |
Fastest Lap: Glenn Seton (Glenn Seton Racing), 1:32.0343

=== Race 3 ===
| Pos. | No. | Name | Team | Vehicle | Laps | Time | Grid |
|---|---|---|---|---|---|---|---|
| 1 | 1 | (Australia) Craig Lowndes | Holden Racing Team | Holden Commodore (VT) | 9 | 13min 53.5105sec | 2 |
| 2 | 2 | (Australia) Mark Skaife | Holden Racing Team | Holden Commodore (VT) | 9 | + 1.718 | 1 |
| 3 | 34 | (Australia) Garth Tander | Garry Rogers Motorsport | Holden Commodore (VS) | 9 | + 6.868 | 4 |
| 4 | 5 | (Australia) Glenn Seton | Glenn Seton Racing | Ford Falcon (AU) | 9 | + 9.714 | 7 |
| 5 | 8 | (Australia) Russell Ingall | Perkins Engineering | Holden Commodore (VT) | 9 | + 10.555 | 8 |
| 6 | 12 | (New Zealand) Greg Murphy | Gibson Motorsport | Holden Commodore (VT) | 9 | + 11.249 | 9 |
| 7 | 25 | (Australia) Tony Longhurst | Longhurst Racing | Ford Falcon (AU) | 9 | + 11.492 | 10 |
| 8 | 99 | (Australia) Mark Noske | Holden Young Lions | Holden Commodore (VS) | 9 | + 13.167 | 11 |
| 9 | 31 | (Australia) Steven Ellery | Steven Ellery Racing | Ford Falcon (EL) | 9 | + 18.497 | 21 |
| 10 | 40 | (Australia) Cameron McLean | Greenfield Mowers Racing | Ford Falcon (EL) | 9 | + 19.724 | 17 |
| 11 | 46 | (New Zealand) John Faulkner | John Faulkner Racing | Holden Commodore (VS) | 9 | + 20.096 | 12 |
| 12 | 30 | (Australia) Greg Crick | Greg Crick Motorsport | Ford Falcon (EL) | 9 | + 20.747 | 20 |
| 13 | 10 | (Australia) Mark Larkham | Larkham Motorsport | Ford Falcon (AU) | 9 | + 21.814 | 26 |
| 14 | 17 | (Australia) Dick Johnson | Dick Johnson Racing | Ford Falcon (AU) | 9 | + 22.811 | 24 |
| 15 | 35 | (Australia) Jason Bargwanna | Garry Rogers Motorsport | Holden Commodore (VT) | 9 | + 23.774 | 5 |
| 16 | 6 | (Australia) Neil Crompton | Glenn Seton Racing | Ford Falcon (EL) | 9 | + 25.797 | 34 |
| 17 | 18 | (New Zealand) Paul Radisich | Dick Johnson Racing | Ford Falcon (AU) | 9 | + 32.130 | 15 |
| 18 | 27 | (Australia) Terry Finnigan | Terry Finnigan Racing | Holden Commodore (VS) | 9 | + 34.229 | 22 |
| 19 | 50 | (Australia) Michael Donaher | Clive Wiseman Racing | Holden Commodore (VS) | 9 | + 36.134 | 23 |
| 20 | 7 | (New Zealand) Steven Richards | Gibson Motorsport | Holden Commodore (VT) | 9 | + 39.134 | 38 |
| 21 | 28 | (Australia) Rodney Forbes | Bob Forbes Racing | Holden Commodore (VS) | 9 | + 42.110 | 16 |
| 22 | 3 | (Australia) Trevor Ashby | Lansvale Racing Team | Holden Commodore (VS) | 9 | + 42.273 | 19 |
| 23 | 75 | (Australia) Anthony Tratt | Paul Little Racing | Ford Falcon (EL) | 9 | + 50.152 | 27 |
| 24 | 79 | (Australia) Mike Conway | Cadillac Productions | Ford Falcon (EL) | 9 | + 53.922 | 28 |
| 25 | 26 | (Australia) John Cotter | M3 Motorsport | Holden Commodore (VS) | 9 | + 53.938 | 36 |
| 26 | 77 | (Australia) Richard Mork | V8 Racing | Holden Commodore (VS) | 9 | + 55.176 | 31 |
| 27 | 52 | (Australia) Barry Morcom | Barry Morcom Racing | Holden Commodore (VS) | 9 | + 55.299 | 32 |
| 28 | 24 | (Australia) Paul Romano | Romano Racing | Holden Commodore (VS) | 9 | + 58.442 | 18 |
| 29 | 54 | (Australia) Simon Emerzidis | Simon Emerzidis Racing | Ford Falcon (EL) | 9 | + 1:00.401 | 35 |
| 30 | 4 | (Australia) Jason Bright | Stone Brothers Racing | Ford Falcon (AU) | 9 | + 1:01.582 | 6 |
| Ret | 11 | (Australia) Larry Perkins | Perkins Engineering | Holden Commodore (VT) | 8 | Collision | 3 |
| Ret | 80 | (Australia) Bob Thorn | Briggs Motorsport | Ford Falcon (AU) | 0 | Retired | 29 |
| Ret | 37 | (Australia) Bill Attard | Scotty Taylor Racing | Holden Commodore (VS) | 0 | Retired | 30 |
| Ret | 39 | (Australia) Chris Smerdon | Challenge Motorsport | Holden Commodore (VS) | 0 | Retired | 33 |
| DNS | 15 | (Australia) Todd Kelly | Holden Young Lions | Holden Commodore (VS) | | Did not start | |
| DNS | 16 | (Australia) Dugal McDougall | McDougall Motorsport | Holden Commodore (VS) | | Did not start | |
| DNS | 22 | (Australia) Danny Osbourne | Colourscan Motorsport | Ford Falcon (EL) | | Did not start | |
| DNS | 32 | (Australia) Tomas Mezera | Tomas Mezera Motorsport | Holden Commodore (VT) | | Did not start | |
| DNS | 43 | (Australia) Paul Weel | Paul Weel Racing | Ford Falcon (AU) | | Did not start | |
| DNS | 51 | (Australia) Charles Ryman | Charles Ryman Racing | Ford Falcon (EL) | | Did not start | |
| DNS | 55 | (Australia) Rod Nash | Rod Nash Racing | Holden Commodore (VS) | | Did not start | |
| DNS | 72 | (Australia) David Parsons | Robert Smith Racing | Holden Commodore (VS) | | Did not start | |
| DNS | 96 | (Australia) Paul Dumbrell | John Faulkner Racing | Holden Commodore (VS) | | Did not start | |
| DNS | 600 | (Australia) John Bowe | PAE Motorsport | Ford Falcon (EL) | | Did not start | |
Fastest Lap: Mark Skaife (Holden Racing Team), 1:31.7301
