= 1999 Shell Championship Series =

Motor racing competition

1999 V8 Supercar

Champions
- Drivers' champion: Craig Lowndes
- Teams' champions: Holden Racing Team

Seasons
- ← 1998 2000 →

The 1999 Shell Championship Series was a motor racing series for V8 Supercars which began on 28 March 1999 at Eastern Creek Raceway and ended on 14 November at the Mount Panorama Circuit after 13 rounds. The Australian Touring Car Championship was renamed for 1999 in what was essentially a marketing decision, however the winner of the newly named series was also awarded the 1999 Australian Touring Car Championship title by CAMS. 1999 was the first season since 1977 in which the longer distance, endurance race events were included in the championship. For the first time in the championship's history, tyres supplied by Bridgestone specified for all cars.

The series was won by Craig Lowndes of the Holden Racing Team.

== Teams and drivers ==
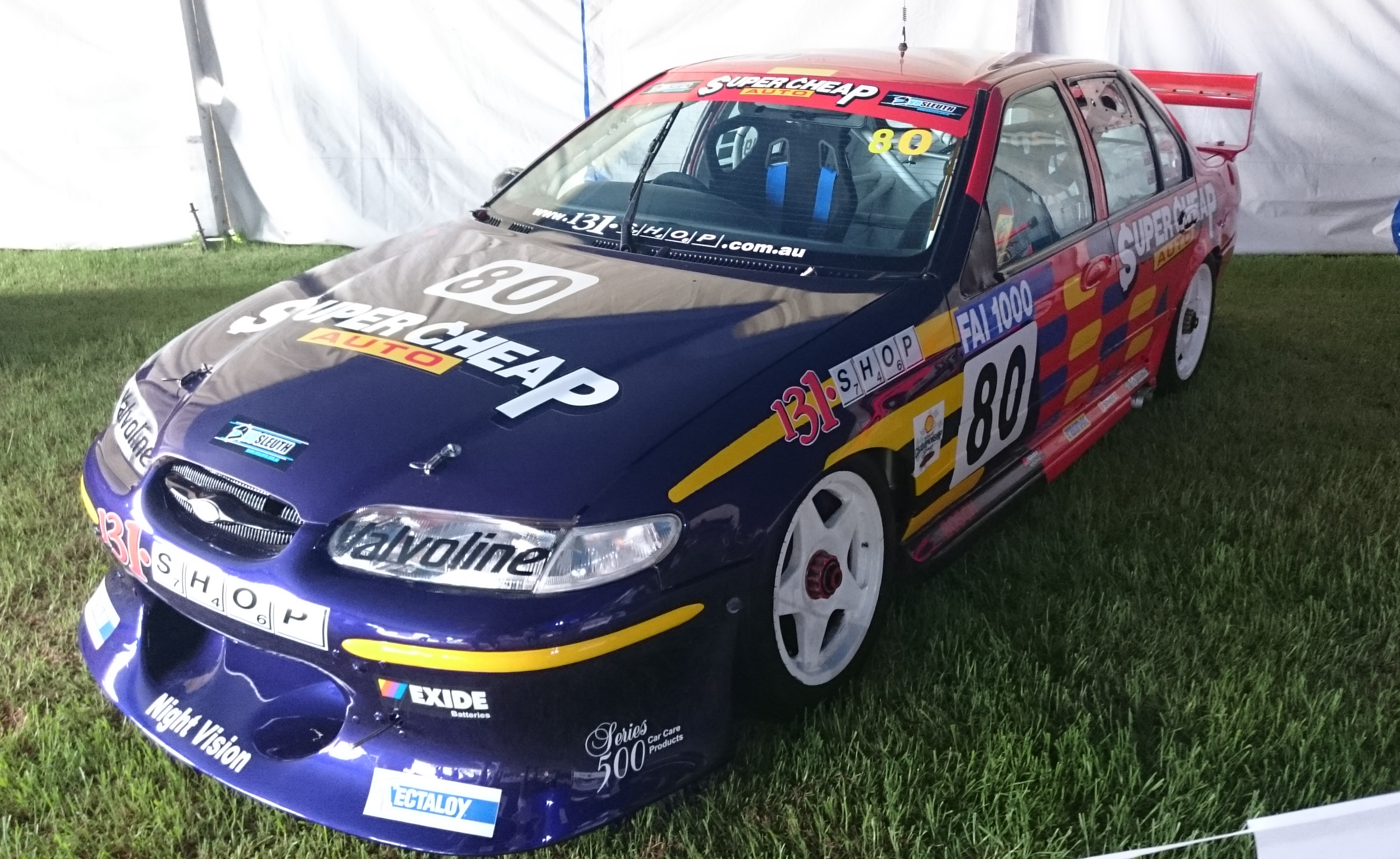
The Ford Falcon EL in which Bob Thorn contested the Championship for Briggs Motor Sport. The car is pictured in 2018 in its 1999 colours.

The following drivers and teams competed in the 1999 Shell Championship Series. The series consisted of 11 rounds of sprint racing with one driver per car and two rounds (the Queensland 500 and the Bathurst 1000) of endurance racing with each car shared by two drivers.

Team	Car	Level	No.	Driver	Events	Co-Driver	Events
Holden Racing Team	Holden Commodore VT	O	1	(Australia) Craig Lowndes	1–8, 11–13	(Australia) Cameron McConville	12–13
Holden Racing Team	Holden Commodore VS	O	1	(Australia) Craig Lowndes	10	—	
Holden Racing Team	Holden Commodore VS	O	15	(Australia) Cameron McConville	9	—	
Holden Racing Team	Holden Commodore VT	O	2	(Australia) Mark Skaife	All	(Australia) Paul Morris	12–13
Lansvale Racing Team	Holden Commodore VS	P	3	(Australia) Trevor Ashby	1–2, 6–7, 11–13	(Australia) Steve Reed	12–13
Lansvale Racing Team	Holden Commodore VS	P	3	(Australia) Steve Reed	3–5, 8–10	—	
Bob Forbes Racing	Holden Commodore VS	P	28	(Australia) Rodney Forbes	All	(Australia) Geoff Full	12–13
Stone Brothers Racing	Ford Falcon AU	O	4	(Australia) Jason Bright	All	(New Zealand) Craig Baird	12–13
Glenn Seton Racing	Ford Falcon AU	O	5	(Australia) Glenn Seton	All	(Australia) Neil Crompton	12–13
Glenn Seton Racing	Ford Falcon AU	O	6	(Australia) Geoff Brabham	12–13	(Australia) Neal Bates	12–13
Glenn Seton Racing	Ford Falcon AU	O	6	(Australia) Neil Crompton	2–11	—	
Glenn Seton Racing	Ford Falcon EL	O	6	(Australia) Neil Crompton	1	—	
Gibson Motorsport	Holden Commodore VT	O	7	(New Zealand) Steven Richards	All	(New Zealand) Greg Murphy	12–13
Gibson Motorsport	Holden Commodore VT	O	12	(New Zealand) Greg Murphy	1–11	—	
Gibson Motorsport	Holden Commodore VT	P	73	(Australia) David "Truckie" Parsons	12–13	(Australia) David "Skippy" Parsons	12–13
Gibson Motorsport	Holden Commodore VS	P	73	(Australia) David "Truckie" Parsons	4–11	—	
Perkins Engineering	Holden Commodore VT	O	8	(Australia) Russell Ingall	1–11	—	
Perkins Engineering	Holden Commodore VT	O	11	(Australia) Larry Perkins	All	(Australia) Russell Ingall	12–13
Perkins Engineering	Holden Commodore VT	O	16	(Australia) Dugal McDougall	6–13	(Australia) Andrew Miedecke	12–13
Perkins Engineering	Holden Commodore VS	O	16	(Australia) Dugal McDougall	1–4	—	
Larkham Motorsport	Ford Falcon AU	O	10	(Australia) Mark Larkham	All	(Australia) Brad Jones	12–13
Imrie Motorsport	Holden Commodore VS	P	14	(Australia) Mike Imrie	2, 4-6, 8-10, 12-13	(Australia) Rodney Crick	12–13
Holden Young Lions	Holden Commodore VT	O	15	(Australia) Todd Kelly	13	(Australia) Mark Noske	13
Holden Young Lions	Holden Commodore VS	O	15	(Australia) Todd Kelly	1, 6–7, 12	(Australia) Mark Noske	12
Holden Young Lions	Holden Commodore VS	O	99	(Australia) Mark Noske	1–7	—	
Dick Johnson Racing	Ford Falcon AU	O	17	(Australia) Dick Johnson	1–7, 9–13	(Australia) Steven Johnson	12–13
Dick Johnson Racing	Ford Falcon AU	O	17	(Australia) Steven Johnson	8	—	
Dick Johnson Racing	Ford Falcon AU	O	18	(New Zealand) Paul Radisich	All	(Australia) Steven Ellery	12–13
Wayne Gardner Racing	Holden Commodore VT	O	19	(Australia) Wayne Gardner	2, 13	(Australia) David Brabham	13
Peters Motorsport	Ford Falcon AU	O	22	(Australia) Daniel Osborne	13	(Australia) Brett Peters	13
Peters Motorsport	Ford Falcon EL	O	22	(Australia) Daniel Osborne	1–2, 6–7, 10, 12	(Australia) Brett Peters	12
Peters Motorsport	Ford Falcon EL	O	22	(Australia) Brett Peters	3	—	
Peters Motorsport	Ford Falcon EL	P	42	(Australia) Mark Williams	13	(Australia) Scott Fleming	13
Romano Racing	Holden Commodore VS	O	24	(Australia) Paul Romano	1, 3–4, 7–13	(Australia) Tomas Mezera	12
Romano Racing	Holden Commodore VS	O	24	(Australia) Paul Romano	1, 3–4, 7–13	(Australia) Darren Hossack	13
Longhurst Racing	Ford Falcon AU	O	25	(Australia) Tony Longhurst	All	(Australia) Adam Macrow	12–13
M3 Motorsport	Holden Commodore VS	P	26	(Australia) John Cotter	1, 6–7, 12–13	(Australia) Peter Doulman	12–13
M3 Motorsport	Holden Commodore VS	P	26	(Australia) Peter Doulman	2, 4, 8, 10–11	—	
Terry Finnigan Racing Team	Holden Commodore VS	P	27	(Australia) Terry Finnigan	1, 13	(Australia) Darren Pate	13
Terry Finnigan Racing Team	Holden Commodore VS	P	27	(Australia) Darren Pate	8, 10–11	—	
Greg Crick Motorsport	Ford Falcon EL	O	30	(Australia) Greg Crick	1	—	
Harris Racing	Ford Falcon EL	P	30	(Australia) Craig Harris	7, 10–11, 13	(Australia) Tim Shaw	13
Steven Ellery Racing	Ford Falcon EL	O	31	(Australia) Steven Ellery	1, 4–5, 7, 10–11	—	
Tomas Mezera Motorsport	Holden Commodore VT	O	32	(Australia) Tomas Mezera	1–2, 4, 6–7, 13	(Australia) Tony Ricciardello	13
Pro-Duct Motorsport	Holden Commodore VS	P	33	(Australia) Allan McCarthy	6	—	
Pro-Duct Motorsport	Holden Commodore VS	P	33	(Australia) Phil Ward	7, 13	(Australia) Allan McCarthy	13
Garry Rogers Motorsport	Holden Commodore VS	O	34	(Australia) Garth Tander	1–10	—	
Garry Rogers Motorsport	Holden Commodore VT	O	34	(Australia) Garth Tander	11–13	(Australia) Jason Bargwanna	12–13
Garry Rogers Motorsport	Holden Commodore VT	O	35	(Australia) Jason Bargwanna	1–11	—	
Garry Rogers Motorsport	Holden Commodore VT	O	35	(Australia) Greg Ritter	12–13	(Australia) Matthew Coleman	12
Garry Rogers Motorsport	Holden Commodore VT	O	35	(Australia) Greg Ritter	12–13	(Australia) Steve Owen	13
Gearbox Motorsport	Holden Commodore VS	P	36	(Australia) Neil Schembri	13	(Australia) Gary Quartly	13
Scotty Taylor Racing	Holden Commodore VS	P	37	(Australia) Bill Attard	1, 11, 13	(Australia) Alan Taylor	13
South Pacific Motor Racing	Holden Commodore VS	P	38	(Australia) Peter Field	13	(Australia) Shane Howison	13
Challenge Motorsport	Holden Commodore VS	P	39	(Australia) Chris Smerdon	1–2, 6–8, 10–13	(Australia) Mal Rose	12
Challenge Motorsport	Holden Commodore VS	P	39	(Australia) Chris Smerdon	1–2, 6–8, 10–13	(Australia) Charlie Cox	13
Greenfield Mowers Racing	Ford Falcon EL	P	40	(Australia) Cameron McLean	All	(Australia) Wayne Park	12
Greenfield Mowers Racing	Ford Falcon EL	P	40	(Australia) Cameron McLean	All	(United Kingdom) John Cleland	13
Emerzidis Motorsport	Holden Commodore VS	P	41	(Australia) Garry Willmington	4	—	
Emerzidis Motorsport	Ford Falcon EL	P	41	(Australia) Garry Holt	13	(Australia) Bill Sieders	13
Emerzidis Motorsport	Ford Falcon EL	P	54	(Australia) Simon Emerzidis	1–2, 4, 7, 11–13	(Australia) Garry Willmington	12–13
Paul Weel Racing	Ford Falcon AU	O	43	(Australia) Paul Weel	1, 4–13	(Australia) Greg Crick	12–13
John Faulkner Racing	Holden Commodore VT	O	46	(New Zealand) John Faulkner	All	(New Zealand) Simon Wills	12–13
John Faulkner Racing	Holden Commodore VS	O	96	(Australia) Paul Dumbrell	1, 9, 12–13	(Australia) Matthew White	12–13
John Faulkner Racing	Holden Commodore VS	O	96	(Australia) Cameron McConville	6–8	—	
John Faulkner Racing	Holden Commodore VS	O	96	(Australia) Matthew White	10	—	
Daily Planet Racing	Holden Commodore VS	P	47	(Australia) John Trimbole	12–13	(Australia) Kevin Heffernan	12–13
Rod Smith Racing	Holden Commodore VS	P	48	(Australia) D'Arcy Russell	2–5, 8, 12–13	(Australia) Grant Johnson	12–13
Crambrook Racing	Holden Commodore VS	P	49	(Australia) Layton Crambrook	8–13	(Australia) Dean Crosswell	12–13
Clive Wiseman Racing	Holden Commodore VS	P	50	(Australia) Michael Donaher	1–7, 10–11	—	
Clive Wiseman Racing	Holden Commodore VS	P	50	(Australia) Dean Lindstrom	12–13	(Australia) Melinda Price	12–13
Charles Ryman Racing	Ford Falcon EL	P	51	(Australia) Charles Ryman	1	—	
Charles Ryman Racing	Ford Falcon EL	P	51	(Australia) Wayne Wakefield	5, 7	—	
Barry Morcom Racing	Holden Commodore VS	P	52	(Australia) Barry Morcom	1–2, 6–7, 11	—	
Rod Nash Racing	Holden Commodore VS	P	55	(Australia) Rod Nash	1–5, 7–8, 10–12	(Australia) Dean Wanless	12
Rod Nash Racing	Holden Commodore VT	P	55	(Australia) Rod Nash	13	(Australia) Dean Wanless	13
Pretty Motorsport	Holden Commodore VS	P	60	(Australia) Nathan Pretty	3, 10, 13	(New Zealand) Andrew Fawcet	13
Pretty Motorsport	Holden Commodore VS	P	60	(Australia) Nicole Pretty	8	—	
James Rosenberg Racing	Holden Commodore VT	P	66	(Australia) Mark Poole	8–10, 12–13	(Australia) Tony Scott	12–13
Briggs Motor Sport	Ford Falcon AU	P	70	(Australia) John Briggs	2, 4–7, 10–13	(Australia) Tim Leahey	12–13
Briggs Motor Sport	Ford Falcon AU	P	80	(Australia) Bob Thorn	1	—	
Briggs Motor Sport	Ford Falcon EL	P	80	(Australia) Bob Thorn	4–5, 7–8, 11–13	(Australia) Todd Wanless	12–13
Robert Smith Racing	Holden Commodore VS	P	72	(Australia) David Parsons	1–2	—	
Paul Little Racing	Ford Falcon EL	O	75	(Australia) Anthony Tratt	1, 4–6	—	
Paul Little Racing	Ford Falcon AU	O	75	(Australia) Anthony Tratt	8–10, 12–13	(Australia) Alan Jones	12–13
V8 Racing	Holden Commodore VS	P	77	(Australia) Richard Mork	1, 6, 11, 13	(Australia) Christian D'Agostin	13
Cadillac Productions	Ford Falcon EL	P	79	(Australia) Mike Conway	1–2, 6–7, 10–13	(Australia) Ric Shaw	12–13
Cadillac Productions	Ford Falcon EL	P	79	(Australia) Bob Jones	8	—	
Rowse Motors	Holden Commodore VP	P	81	(Australia) Tim Rowse	13	(Australia) Ron Barnacle	13
Miller Racing	Holden Commodore VS	P	84	(Australia) Daniel Miller	2–3, 5, 12–13	(Australia) Tony Ricciardello	12
Miller Racing	Holden Commodore VS	P	84	(Australia) Daniel Miller	2–3, 5, 12–13	(Australia) Geoff Kendrick	13
Rod Salmon Racing	Holden Commodore VS	P	87	(Australia) Damien White	11, 13	(Australia) Rod Salmon	13
Kendrick Racing	Holden Commodore VS	P	92	(Australia) Geoff Kendrick	3, 5	—	
Graphic Skills Racing	Holden Commodore VS	P	97	(Australia) Wayne Wakefield	12–13	(Australia) Dean Canto	12–13
Owen Parkinson Racing	Holden Commodore VS	P	98	(Australia) Kerryn Brewer	2	—	
Owen Parkinson Racing	Holden Commodore VS	P	98	(Australia) Gary Baxter	4	—	
Owen Parkinson Racing	Holden Commodore VS	P	98	(Australia) Wayne Wakefield	6	—	
Owen Parkinson Racing	Holden Commodore VS	P	98	(Australia) Kim Jane	8	—	
Owen Parkinson Racing	Holden Commodore VS	P	98	(Australia) David Parsons	9–10	—	
Owen Parkinson Racing	Holden Commodore VS	P	98	(Australia) Dean Canto	11	—	
Owen Parkinson Racing	Holden Commodore VS	P	98	(Australia) Barry Cassidy	13	(Australia) Neil Crowe	13
Power Racing	Ford Falcon EL	P	134	(Australia) Alan Heath	2–3, 5, 7–8, 12–13	(Australia) Warren Luff	12
Power Racing	Ford Falcon EL	P	134	(Australia) Alan Heath	2–3, 5, 7–8, 12–13	(Australia) Mick Donaher	13
PAE Motorsport	Ford Falcon EL	O	600	(Australia) John Bowe	1–2	—	
PAE Motorsport	Ford Falcon AU	O	600	(Australia) John Bowe	3–13	(New Zealand) Jim Richards	12–13

Icon	Class
O	Outright
P	Privateers

== Race calendar ==
The 1999 Shell Championship Series consisted of 13 rounds which included eleven sprint rounds of two or three races and two endurance races (Queensland 500 and FAI 1000). It was the first time since 1977 that endurance races had been included in the championship.

Rd.	Race title Circuit	Location / State	Date	Winner(s)	Team	Report
1	Eastern Creek Raceway	Eastern Creek, New South Wales	26–28 March	Mark Skaife	Holden Racing Team	Report
2	Sensational Adelaide 500; Adelaide Street Circuit	Adelaide, South Australia	8–11 April	Craig Lowndes	Holden Racing Team	Report
3	Barbagallo Raceway	Perth, Western Australia	30 April – 2 May	Craig Lowndes	Holden Racing Team	
4	Phillip Island	Phillip Island, Victoria	14–16 May	Mark Skaife	Holden Racing Team	
5	Hidden Valley Raceway	Darwin, Northern Territory	4–6 June	Jason Bright	Stone Brothers Racing	
6	Sandown International Raceway	Melbourne, Victoria	25–27 June	Mark Skaife	Holden Racing Team	Report
7	Queensland Raceway	Ipswich, Queensland	9–11 July	Garth Tander	Garry Rogers Motorsport	
8	Calder Park Raceway	Melbourne, Victoria	23–25 July	Mark Skaife	Holden Racing Team	
9	Symmons Plains Raceway	Launceston, Tasmania	6–8 August	Mark Skaife	Holden Racing Team	Report
10	Winton Motor Raceway	Benalla, Victoria	20–22 August	Jason Bargwanna	Garry Rogers Motorsport	
11	Oran Park Raceway	Sydney, New South Wales	3–5 September	Mark Skaife	Holden Racing Team	Report
12	Queensland 500; Queensland Raceway	Ipswich, Queensland	17–19 September	Russell Ingall; Larry Perkins	Perkins Engineering	Report
13	FAI 1000; Mount Panorama Circuit	Bathurst, New South Wales	11–14 November	Steven Richards; Greg Murphy	Gibson Motorsport	Report

Event locations

== Championship standings ==
Format	1st	2nd	3rd	4th	5th	6th	7th	8th	9th	10th	11th	12th	13th	14th	15th	16th	17th	18th	19th	20th	21st	22nd	23rd	24th	25th
Sprint races	50	46	44	42	40	38	36	34	32	30	28	26	24	22	20	18	16	14	12	10	8	6	4	2	1
Endurance races	300	276	264	252	240	228	216	204	192	180	168	156	144	132	120	108	96	84	72	60	48	36	24	12	6

Pos.	Driver	ECK			ADE	PER			PHI			DAR			SAN			IPS1			CAL			TAS			WIN			OPK			IPS2	BAT	Total
Pos.	Driver	R1	R2	R3	R1	R1	R2	R3	R1	R2	R3	R1	R2	R3	R1	R2	R3	R1	R2	R3	R1	R2	R3	R1	R2	R3	R1	R2	R3	R1	R2	R3	R1	R1	Total
1	(Australia) Craig Lowndes	3	2	1	1	1	1	1	2	2	1	3	3	Ret	2	2	1	3	1	5	1	Ret	WD				16	7	5	2	2	2	3	2	1918
2	(Australia) Russell Ingall	9	8	5	4	Ret	10	4	3	5	6	1	1	14	18	11	6	1	2	Ret	4	2	Ret	7	5	2	4	3	2	6	11	8	1	7	1804
3	(Australia) Mark Skaife	1	1	2	Ret	2	8	17	1	1	2	7	7	5	1	1	2	4	4	11	2	1	2	2	1	1	8	6	11	1	1	1	22	3	1656
=	(Australia) Glenn Seton	5	7	4	9	3	2	2	4	3	3	2	4	21	6	5	7	Ret	17	9	9	5	4	10	6	4	Ret	WD	WD	9	16	11	4	5	=
5	(Australia) Garth Tander	4	4	3	24	10	Ret	7	8	9	Ret	5	6	2	7	4	3	2	3	2	5	4	1	8	4	Ret	3	4	6	5	4	4	2	Ret	1470
6	(New Zealand) Greg Murphy	13	9	6	2	Ret	Ret	13	13	24	14	15	10	19	13	7	10	9	11	12	20	11	12	1	10	7	14	17	12	Ret	17	12	6	1	1428
7	(New Zealand) Steven Richards	11	Ret	20	5	11	7	5	7	8	4	17	Ret	Ret	8	Ret	19	17	9	Ret	8	WD	WD	11	8	WD	14	9	15	Ret	14	10	6	1	1310
8	(Australia) Jason Bright	2	6	30	3	4	3	6	14	14	8	4	2	1	5	6	5	6	6	4	3	Ret	DNS	5	Ret	14	2	2	4	3	3	3	Ret	Ret	1276
9	(Australia) Larry Perkins	6	3	Ret	7	7	16	11	WD	WD	WD	11	11	8	14	10	9	Ret	DNS	WD	14	10	13	14	11	6	27	Ret	Ret	14	10	16	1	7	1232
10	(Australia) Dick Johnson	16	24	14	10	14	9	29	11	10	10	9	13	13	12	9	8	Ret	14	Ret				Ret	16	9	11	10	10	12	12	Ret	7	4	1160
11	(Australia) Jason Bargwanna	8	5	15	8	9	24	16	Ret	WD	WD	8	8	4	10	17	Ret	7	26	8	Ret	15	10	4	2	3	1	1	1	28	9	Ret	2	Ret	1148
12	(Australia) Neil Crompton	Ret	Ret	16	13	5	5	Ret	Ret	22	24	6	24	Ret	Ret	19	15	8	8	3	6	WD	WD	3	3	Ret	25	14	9	8	19	26	4	5	1107
13	(Australia) John Bowe	12	Ret	DNS	11	8	Ret	14	9	7	5	10	5	3	3	Ret	16	11	7	1	7	3	3	16	9	5	Ret	12	8	11	8	12	18	Ret	1078
14	(Australia) Tony Longhurst	7	10	7	Ret	12	6	21	15	6	12	12	15	6	9	16	12	15	16	7	12	9	9	12	17	11	6	13	Ret	Ret	15	9	Ret	Ret	830
15	(New Zealand) John Faulkner	34	12	11	Ret	6	13	Ret	5	4	Ret	Ret	23	9	11	8	Ret	12	10	16	13	8	8	19	12	Ret	10	8	7	13	Ret	DNS	9	Ret	824
16	(New Zealand) Paul Radisich	Ret	15	17	Ret	13	4	3	6	13	Ret	DNS	9	12	4	3	4	5	5	6	Ret	12	7	Ret	Ret	WD	5	5	3	10	5	5	Ret	Ret	812
17	(Australia) Cameron McConville														22	13	13	30	Ret	WD	11	7	6	6	7	WD							3	2	770
18	(Australia) Cameron McLean	Ret	17	10	12	16	11	9	29	Ret	13	Ret	19	24	17	12	11	Ret	25	15	17	13	11	9	13	Ret	18	16	14	7	7	6	Ret	Ret	721
19	(Australia) Mark Noske	15	11	8	6	Ret	21	10	Ret	16	7	14	12	15	Ret	22	17	Ret	WD	WD													Ret	6	688
20	(Australia) David Parsons	23	25	DNS	18				20	17	28	19	Ret	17	24	25	23	19	Ret	21	23	20	20	17	21	8	Ret	Ret	Ret	22	Ret	WD	5	11	670
21	(Australia) Mark Larkham	14	26	13	Ret	18	14	12	Ret	15	Ret	26	16	7	15	15	14	10	13	10	28	14	14	15	Ret	13	28	19	25	21	Ret	Ret	16	Ret	617
22	(Australia) Steve Reed					19	15	15	10	12	26	13	17	11							25	16	16	18	18	21	17	21	16				8	16	595
23	(Australia) Steven Johnson																				10	6	5										7	4	576
24	(Australia) Paul Weel	WD	WD	WD					21	18	15	18	18	23	21	23	21	27	Ret	Ret	Ret	22	19	23	14	10	Ret	24	20	27	Ret	15	14	8	536
25	(Australia) Trevor Ashby	19	19	22	23										20	21	24	22	20	Ret										17	13	13	8	16	514
26	(Australia) Paul Romano	22	18	28	Ret	17	12	8	12	11	11							Ret	Ret	Ret	15	Ret	DNS	20	20	12	9	15	13	15	18	Ret	Ret	13	498
27	(Australia) Dugal McDougall	20	13	Ret	DNS	20	18	23	16	WD	WD				16	20	27	Ret	Ret	WD	18	24	Ret	28	23	Ret	Ret	25	22	18	20	17	11	20	451
28	(Australia) David Parsons																							21	24	15	21	28	28				5	11	446
29	(Australia) Rodney Forbes	Ret	16	21	16	15	22	Ret	17	30	19	25	21	DNS	26	18	20	20	Ret	25	16	Ret	22	13	22	17	26	33	27	Ret	27	25	Ret	12	423
30	(Australia) Greg Crick	25	20	12																													14	8	373
31	(Australia) Neal Bates																																10	10	360
=	(Australia) Geoff Brabham																																10	10	=
33	(Australia) Mick Donaher	21	23	19	15	Ret	17	20	18	19	20	16	20	16	33	27	25	18	Ret	Ret							12	11	Ret	16	Ret	23		Ret	355
34	(Australia) Greg Ritter																																12	9	348
35	(Australia) Steve Ellery	10	21	9					26	28	9	27	14	10				16	12	Ret							Ret	18	18	4	6	7	Ret	Ret	342
36	(Australia) Todd Kelly	Ret	WD	WD											23	24	22	14	15	14													Ret	6	304
37	(Australia) Paul Morris																																22	3	300
38	(Australia) Layton Crambrook																				19	17	18	22	15	18	23	26	17	DNQ	DNQ	DNQ	13	Ret	246
39	(Australia) Andrew Miedecke																																11	20	228
40	(Australia) Wayne Gardner				14																													14	220
41	(Australia) Rod Nash	27	Ret	WD	Ret	24	19	19	22	29	23	22	Ret	20	WD	WD	WD	26	Ret	WD	27	Ret	Ret				19	32	21	24	25	19	15	Ret	207
42	(New Zealand) Simon Wills																																9	Ret	192
=	(Australia) Steve Owen																																	9	=
44	(Australia) Peter Doulman				19				Ret	23	18										24	25	21				DNQ	DNQ	DNQ	25	24	Ret	19	Ret	181
45	(Australia) Tomas Mezera	18	14	DNS	20				Ret	WD	WD				19	14	18	28	19	18													Ret	Ret	174
46	(Australia) Anthony Tratt	26	27	23					19	Ret	WD	20	Ret	Ret	25	Ret	WD				26	21	25	25	19	16	Ret	29	30	WD	WD	WD	17	Ret	163
47	(Australia) Mark Poole																				21	19	15	24	Ret	Ret	Ret	31	Ret	WD	WD	WD	Ret	15	162
48	(Australia) Dean Lindstrom																																20	17	156
=	(Australia) Melinda Price																																20	17	=
=	(Australia) Geoff Full																																Ret	12	=
=	(Australia) Matthew Coleman																																12		=
52	(Australia) Dean Crosswell																																13	Ret	144
=	(Australia) Darren Hossack																																	13	=
54	(Australia) David Brabham																																	14	132
55	(Australia) D'Arcy Russell				22	27	23	24	24	Ret	25	24	Ret	WD							DNQ	DNQ	DNQ							WD	WD	WD	Ret	19	123
56	(Australia) John Briggs				Ret				Ret	20	16	Ret	WD	WD	30	28	28	13	18	13							20	20	31	DNQ	DNQ	20	Ret	Ret	120
=	(Australia) Tony Scott																																Ret	15	=
=	(Australia) Dean Wanless																																15	Ret	=
59	(Australia) Nathan Pretty					22	20	18																			7	Ret	23					21	118
60	(Australia) Brad Jones																																16	Ret	108
61	(Australia) Chris Smerdon	24	33	Ret	17										28	26	26	23	Ret	Ret	DNS	23	Ret				22	27	24	23	26	18	Ret	Ret	100
62	(Australia) Darren Pate																				22	18	17				13	22	19	20	22	24		Ret	96
=	(Australia) Alan Jones																																17	Ret	=
64	(Australia) Simon Emerzidis	29	Ret	29	21				23	21	17							21	29	Ret										26	23	22	24	Ret	90
65	(New Zealand) Jim Richards																																18	Ret	84
=	(Australia) Gary Quartly																																	18	=
=	(Australia) Neil Schembri																																	18	=
68	(Australia) John Cotter	32	Ret	25											31	31	32	DNQ	Ret	22													19	Ret	78
69	(Australia) Grant Johnson																																Ret	19	72
70	(Australia) Mike Conway	30	28	24	26										32	29	31	29	Ret	WD				WD	WD	WD	DNQ	DNQ	DNQ	DNQ	DNQ	DNQ	21	Ret	70
71	(Australia) Craig Harris																	25	27	Ret							15	23	29	19	21	14		Ret	67
72	(Australia) Wayne Wakefield											Ret	22	18	27	32	30	Ret	22	17													25	Ret	58
73	(Australia) Ric Shaw																																21	Ret	48
=	(New Zealand) Andrew Fawcet																																	21	=
75	(Australia) Danny Osborne	Ret	WD	WD	Ret										Ret	WD	WD	24	23	20							DNQ	30	26				23	Ret	40
76	(Australia) Terry Finnigan	17	22	18																														Ret	36
=	(Australia) Peter Field																																	22	=
=	(Australia) Shane Howison																																	22	=
79	(Australia) Mike Imrie				Ret				27	25	Ret	23	27	22	DNQ	DNQ	29				DNQ	26	23	27	25	Ret	DNQ	DNQ	DNQ				Ret	Ret	28
80	(Australia) Brett Peters					26	Ret	DNS																						WD	WD	WD	23	Ret	24
81	(Australia) Phil Ward																	Ret	21	19														WD	20
82	(Australia) Geoff Kendrick					21	Ret	DNS				21	25	Ret																				Ret	17
83	(Australia) Alan Heath				25	25	25	22				WD	WD	WD				DNQ	24	24	DNQ	DNQ	DNQ										Ret	Ret	16
84	(Australia) Bob Thorn	28	29	Ret					Ret	26	22	Ret	26	Ret	WD	WD	WD	Ret	28	23	DNQ	28	24							DNQ	DNQ	DNQ	Ret	Ret	12
=	(Australia) Garry Willmington								28	WD	27																						24	Ret	=
86	(Australia) Gary Baxter								25	27	21																								9
87	(Australia) Dean Canto																													DNQ	DNQ	DNQ	25	Ret	6
88	(Australia) Daniel Miller				DNS	23	26	Ret				WD	WD	WD																			Ret	Ret	4
NC	(Australia) Richard Mork	DNQ	31	26											DNQ	30	Ret													DNQ	DNQ	DNQ		Ret	0
=	(Australia) Bob Jones																				DNQ	DNQ	26												=
=	(Australia) Paul Dumbrell	WD	WD	WD																				26	Ret	Ret							Ret	Ret	=
=	(Australia) Kevin Heffernan																																26	Ret	=
=	(Australia) John Trimbole																																26	Ret	=
=	(Australia) Barry Morcom	33	32	27	Ret										DNQ	DNQ	DNQ	DNQ	DNQ	DNQ										DNQ	DNQ	DNQ			=
=	(Australia) Kim Jane																				DNQ	27	27												=
=	(Australia) Allan McCarthy														29	Ret	Ret																	WD	=
=	(Australia) Bill Attard	31	30	Ret																										DNQ	DNQ	DNQ		Ret	=
=	(Australia) Kerryn Brewer				Ret																														=
=	(Australia) Matthew White																										DNQ	DNQ	DNQ	WD	WD	WD	Ret	Ret	=
=	(Australia) Damien White																													DNQ	DNQ	DNQ		Ret	=
=	(Australia) Wayne Park																																Ret		=
=	(Australia) Warren Luff																																Ret		=
=	(New Zealand) Craig Baird																																Ret	Ret	=
=	(Australia) Tim Leahey																																Ret	Ret	=
=	(Australia) Adam Macrow																																Ret	Ret	=
=	(Australia) Rodney Crick																																Ret	Ret	=
=	(Australia) Todd Wanless																																Ret	Ret	=
=	(Australia) Tony Ricciardello																																	Ret	=
=	(United Kingdom) John Cleland																																	Ret	=
=	(Australia) Charlie Cox																																	Ret	=
=	(Australia) Christian D'Agostin																																	Ret	=
=	(Australia) Tim Shaw																																	Ret	=
=	(Australia) Rod Salmon																																	Ret	=
=	(Australia) Mark Williams																																	Ret	=
=	(Australia) Scott Fleming																																	Ret	=
=	(Australia) Mal Rose																																	Ret	=
=	(Australia) Ron Barnacle																																	Ret	=
=	(Australia) Tim Rowse																																	Ret	=
=	(Australia) Garry Holt																																	Ret	=
=	(Australia) Bill Sieders																																	Ret	=
=	(Australia) Alan Taylor																																	Ret	=
=	(Australia) Nicole Pretty																				DNQ	DNQ	DNQ												=
=	(Australia) Charles Ryman	WD	WD	WD																															=
=	(Australia) Robert Smith														WD	WD	WD																		=
=	(Australia) Barry Cassidy																																	WD	=
=	(Australia) Neil Crowe																																	WD	=

Colour	Result
Gold	Winner
Silver	Second place
Bronze	Third place
Green	Points classification
Blue	Non-points classification
Blue	Non-classified finish (NC)
Purple	Retired, not classified (Ret)
Red	Did not qualify (DNQ)
Red	Did not pre-qualify (DNPQ)
Black	Disqualified (DSQ)
White	Did not start (DNS)
White	Withdrew (WD)
White	Race cancelled (C)
Blank	Did not practice (DNP)
Blank	Did not arrive (DNA)
Blank	Excluded (EX)

=== Privateers award ===
The Privateers award was contested over all rounds except Rounds 2, 12 & 13. Unlike 1998, points were awarded to the driver rather than the team. The best five scores from the ten rounds could be retained by each driver.

Pos.	Driver	Car	Entrant	Points
1	Cameron McLean	Ford EL Falcon	Greenfield Mowers Racing	250
2	Rodney Forbes	Holden VS Commodore	Bob Forbes Corporation	242
3	Steve Reed	Holden VS Commodore	Lansvale Smash Repairs	230
4	Mick Donaher	Holden VS Commodore	Ultra Tune Racing	220
5	David Parsons	Holden VS Commodore	Smiths Trucks & Challenge Recruitment	214
6	Mike Imrie	Holden VS Commodore	Saabwreck Motorsport	176
7	Chris Smerdon	Holden VS Commodore	Challenge Motorsport	156
8	Bob Thorn	Ford EL Falcon	Supercheap Auto	142
9	Mike Conway	Ford EL Falcon	Cadillac Productions	128
10	Trevor Ashby	Holden VS Commodore	Lansvale Smash Repairs	126

== See also ==
- 1999 Australian Touring Car season
