= Paul Romano =

French footballer (1891-1961)

Personal information
- Date of birth: 3 October 1891
- Date of death: 21 January 1961 (aged 69)
- Position: Defender

International career
Years	Team	Apps	(Gls)
1911–1912	France	3	(0)

Paul Romano (3 October 1891 – 21 January 1961) was a French footballer. He played in three matches for the France national football team from 1911 to 1912. He was also named in France's squad for the football tournament at the 1912 Summer Olympics, but the French side withdrew from the competition.
