= Briggs Motorsport =

- Team Principal: John Briggs
- Debut: 1997
- Final Season: 2003

Briggs Motorsport was an Australian motor racing team which represented Queensland-based businessman John Briggs in the sport. The team has competed in Sports Sedans, Australian GT, Formula Holden, and most notably as a touring car team competing in the V8 Supercar Championship Series. The team last competed in historic motor racing and the Australian GT Championship but was folded at the end of the 2009 season.

== Early years ==
John Briggs, a Queenslander who relocated to Adelaide in the early 1980s due to work commitments, drove a Repco Holden powered Matich A50 Formula 5000 to a surprise second place at the 1978 Australian Grand Prix held at Sandown Raceway in Melbourne. Briggs finished two laps behind race winner Graham McRae after many of the pre-race favourites race such as Kevin Bartlett, Alfredo Costanzo, Vern Schuppan, Garrie Cooper, and reigning Australian Drivers' Champion John McCormack, had all experienced various problems or had crashed out of the race.

Briggs raced a Chevrolet Monza (Dekon chassis #1001) for its owner, John Roberts, which was formerly run in the American-based IMSA GT Championship by Dekon part owner and expatriate Australian Horst Kwech. Roberts had the Monza re-built by Adelaide-based company K&A Engineering for Briggs and he raced it in the Australian Sports Sedan Championship. He later switched from the Monza to an ex-JPS Team BMW 318i Turbo in the Australian GT Championship, before moving back into open wheelers with a Ralt RT21 Formula Holden in 1989. K&A Engineering ran Briggs in both vehicles.

Briggs again competed in Sports Sedans during the early-mid 1990s, winning the 1996 Australian Sports Sedan Championship with a Honda Prelude-Chevrolet.

== V8 Supercars ==
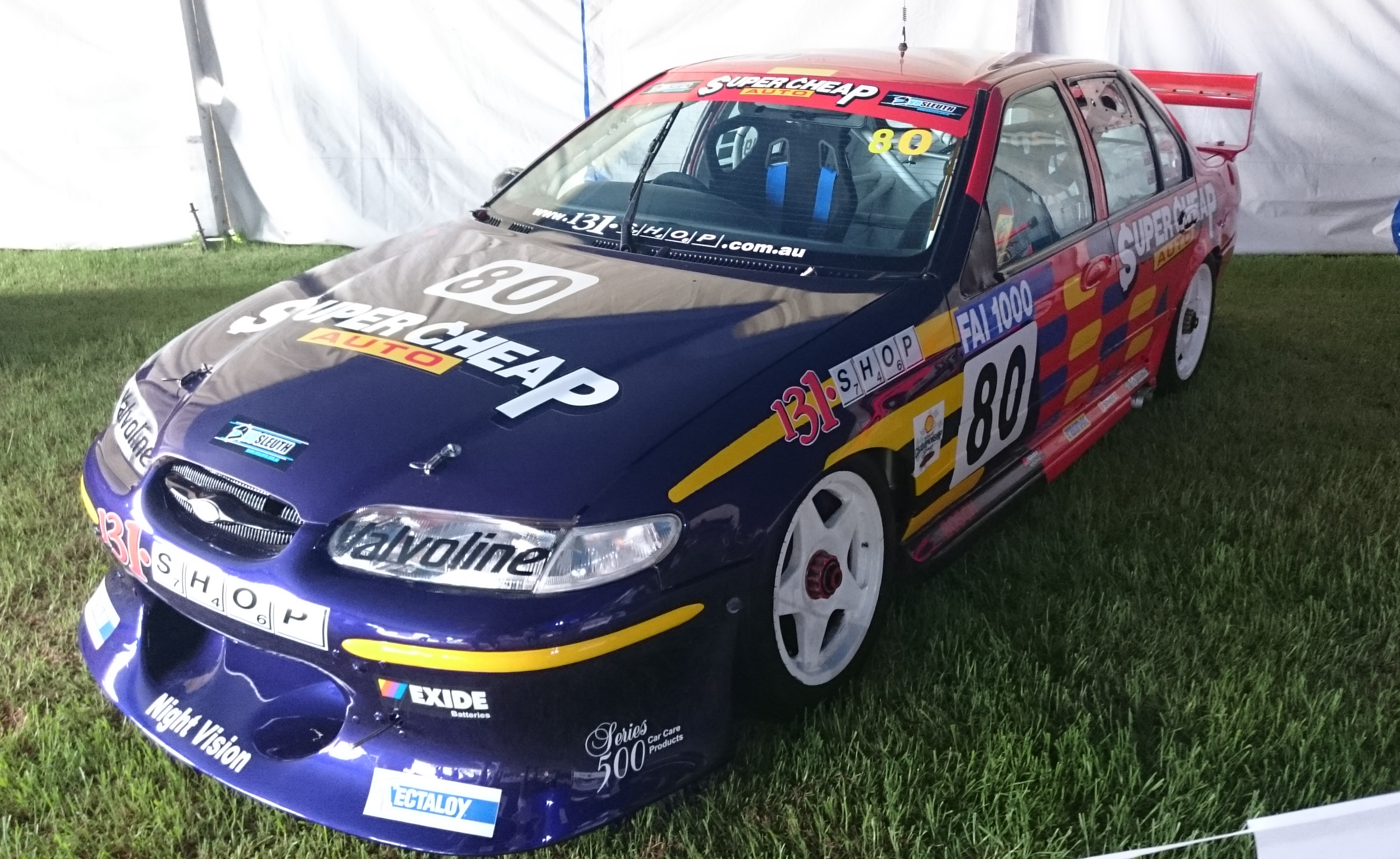
The Ford Falcon EL in which Bob Thorn contested the 1999 Shell Championship Series for Briggs Motor Sport. The car is pictured in 2018 in its 1999 colours.

Briggs Motor Sport made its debut in the 1997 in a Ford EF Falcon for team owner John Briggs, in 1998 it campaigned an EL Falcon, a year later it expanded to a two car team with John Briggs driving an AU Falcon and executive of the team's leading sponsor, Supercheap Auto, Bob Thorn in the older EL Falcon from the year before. In September 1999, Briggs bolstered his operation after purchasing the Perth based PAE Motorsport team, absorbing the Caterpillar backed Ford of John Bowe into the team. The team ran a single car for the next few seasons, the team sacking Bowe after Bathurst in 2001, replacing him with emerging New Zealand driver Simon Wills.

In 2002 the team expanded to three cars with Betta Electrical Fords for veteran Tony Longhurst and Brazilian open wheel driver Max Wilson. Both drivers were replaced in 2003 with Paul Radisich and Dean Canto for the 2003 season but by August, Briggs had sold the V8 Supercar operation to British outfit Triple Eight Race Engineering, to establish an Australian arm of the race team led by Roland Dane, Derek Warwick and Ian Harrison.

Briggs stepped back from professional racing at this point and spent several years away from the sport before investing in some historic racing cars, highlighted by the return of the 1985 Veskanda-Chevrolet sports car to race tracks in 2007. Since then Briggs has expanded his operation into the Australian GT Championship, driving and importing Moslers.

After a diagnosis of prostate cancer, Briggs recently announced his retirement from competitive motorsports. He then sold the VesKanda to Perth based racer Paul Stubber, who would take the car to drive in the Historic Group C sports car races held in Europe during 2012.
