= PAE Motorsport =

Defunct car racing team

- Manufacturer: Ford
- Team Principal: Kevin Otway; Stephen Renshaw
- Team Manager: Les Laidlaw
- Race Drivers: John Bowe
- Chassis: Falcon EL; Falcon AU
- Debut: 1999
- 1999 position: 13th

PAE Motorsport was a V8 Supercar team that contested the 1999 V8 Supercars Series

== History ==
PAE Motorsport was formed at the end of 1998 by Kevin Otway and Stephen Renshaw, operating out of Renshaw's Precision Auto Engineering business in Perth, with John Bowe hired to drive. The team commenced the 1999 season with an ex-Playscape Racing Ford Falcon EL, with a Falcon AU debuted at round three. The team was sponsored by Caterpillar. Renshaw had previously been associated with Graham Blythman's Perth-based Holden V8 team in 1994.

The team was sold in September 1999 to John Briggs Motorsport and relocated to Brisbane.
