= 2005 PlaceMakers V8 International =

V8 Supercar race in New Zealand

(New Zealand) 2005 PlaceMakers V8 International
Event Information
- Round 2 of 13 in the 2005 V8 Supercar Championship Series
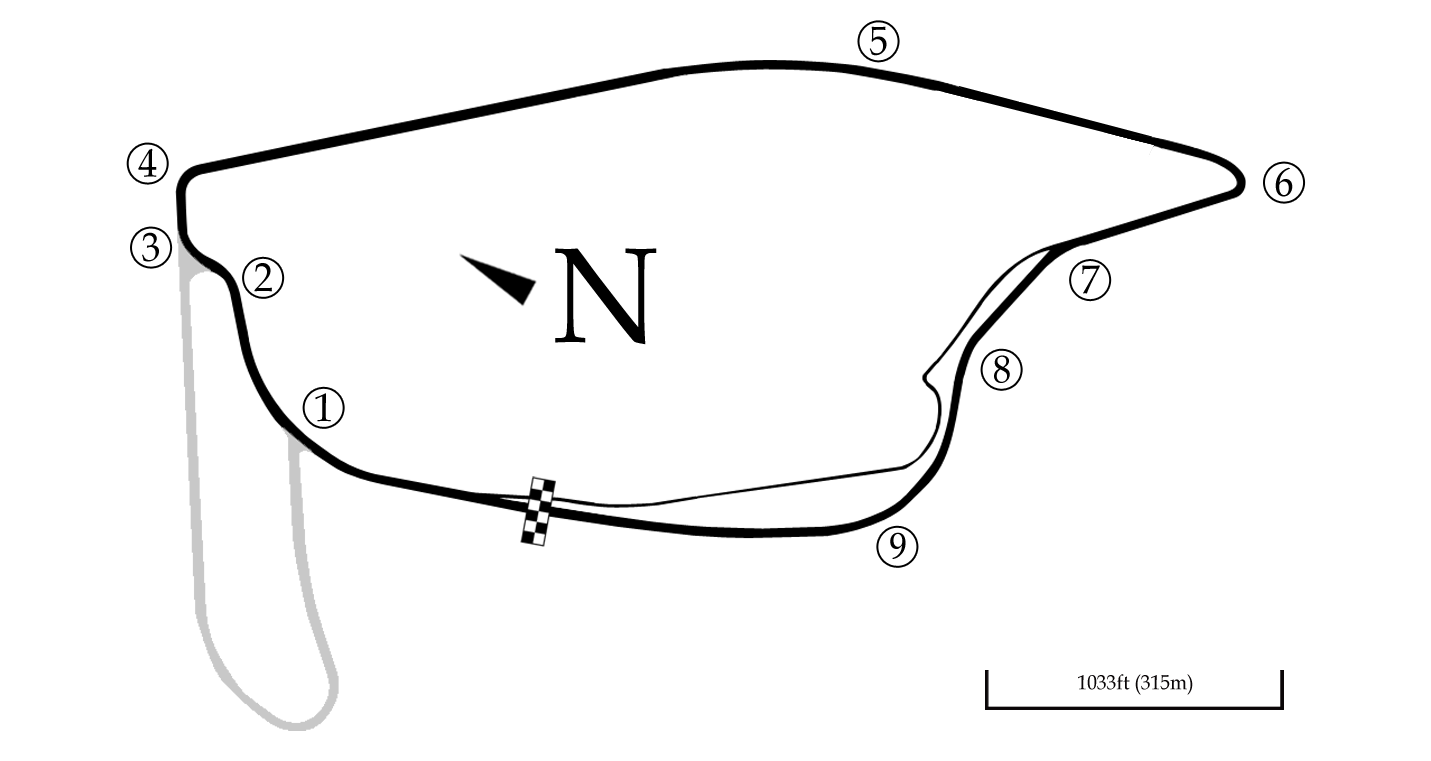
- Date: 15–17 April 2005
- Location: Pukekohe, New Zealand
- Venue: Pukekohe Park Raceway
- Weather: Friday: Sunny; Saturday: Sunny; Sunday: Overcast, light rain

Results
Race 1
Distance	36 laps	100 km
Pole position	Craig Lowndes; Triple Eight Race Engineering	55.7367
Winner	Greg Murphy; Paul Weel Racing	34:53.7573
Race 2
Distance	50 laps	140 km
Winner	Greg Murphy; Paul Weel Racing	52:43.9734
Race 3
Distance	47 laps	132 km
Winner	Greg Murphy; Paul Weel Racing	1:29:16.4683
Round Results
First	Greg Murphy; Paul Weel Racing	192 pts
Second	Russell Ingall; Stone Brothers Racing	186 pts
Third	Marcos Ambrose; Stone Brothers Racing	174 pts

The 2005 PlaceMakers V8 International was a motor race for V8 Supercars held on the weekend of 15-17 April, 2005. The event was held at the Pukekohe Park Raceway in Pukekohe, New Zealand, and consisted of three races culminating in 400 kilometers. It was the second round of thirteen in the 2005 V8 Supercar Championship Series and the first of two international events on the calendar.

After finishing third the previous year, Greg Murphy once again reigned triumphant by winning all three races of the weekend; making it four championship round victories from five attempts for the local hero. After an early tangle between Marcos Ambrose and Craig Lowndes, Russell Ingall remained Murphy's closest competitor all weekend long. The event was notable for a big crash that occurred between Craig Baird and Paul Dumbrell in the final race. The shunt inflicted extensive damage to the track facilities, causing the race to be red flagged. The race would eventually get back underway, finishing under darkness.

This was originally meant to be the last V8 Supercar event held at Pukekohe, with a move to a street race in Auckland having been confirmed for May 2006. However, after this project fell through, a return to Wellington was mooted. When that also failed to materialise, the series would return to Pukekohe for a couple more years.

== Background ==
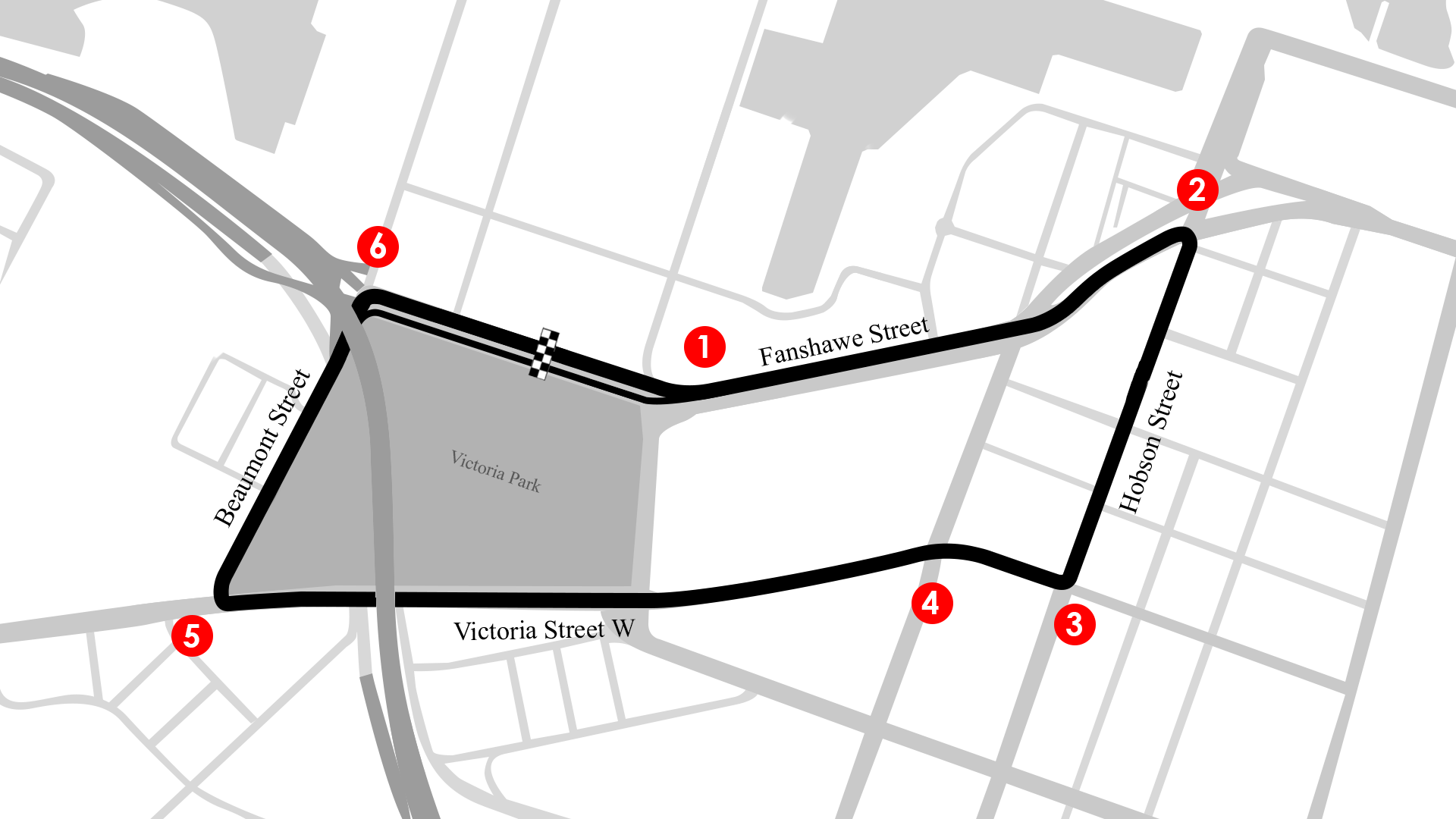
Provisional track map for the proposed Auckland V8 Supercar street race meant for 2006

While the popularity of V8 Supercars in New Zealand enticed officials to explore the possibility of a second championship round in the region, the status of Pukekohe's place on the calendar was up in the air. AVESCO were unsatisfied with the condition of the Pukekohe Park Raceway facilities and thus the search was on for a new home. Multiple venues had submitted proposals to take over the calendar slot from 2006 onwards. These included Wellington, Manfeild and a street race in Auckland. Manfeild's proposal was described by AVESCO chairman Tony Cochrane as being, "...equal of any we have seen in the history of AVESCO - that includes proposals from some of the world's largest and wealthiest cities".

Ultimately, the Auckland street race won proposal won out and the event was expected to replace Pukekohe from April 2006 onwards. An estimate 170,000 people were expected to attend the event which would've taken place right in the heart of Auckland's city centre. Soon after the announcement, safety concerns arose to the circuits configuration, the disruption to proceedings in the CBD and other costs associated with the event. And eventually, the project fell through, the promoter IMG having spent over a million dollars in establishing it. The event would return to Pukekohe for three more years before ceding the event to Hamilton in 2008.

The Pukekohe Park Raceway had been resurfaced since the last event in 2004. Thus lap times were expected to drop significantly. While the infamous bump at turn six remained, the cars would become less animated going over that section of race track.

In the Thursday before the weekend, John Bowe had over $8,000 worth of equipment stolen from his rental car, leaving his participation that weekend in question. Two days later, the stolen goods were recovered.

== Race report ==
=== Qualifying ===
Greg Ritter and Matthew White were excluded from qualifying after missing the weigh bridge during the session.

Pos.	No.	Driver	Team	Car	Time
1	11	(New Zealand) Steven Richards	Perkins Engineering	Holden Commodore (VZ)	55.4789
2	1	(Australia) Marcos Ambrose	Stone Brothers Racing	Ford Falcon (BA)	55.5258
3	9	(Australia) Russell Ingall	Stone Brothers Racing	Ford Falcon (BA)	55.5448
4	51	(New Zealand) Greg Murphy	Paul Weel Racing	Holden Commodore (VZ)	55.5764
5	888	(Australia) Craig Lowndes	Triple Eight Race Engineering	Ford Falcon (BA)	55.6146
6	2	(Australia) Mark Skaife	Holden Racing Team	Holden Commodore (VZ)	55.6629
7	24	(Australia) Paul Dumbrell	Perkins Engineering	Holden Commodore (VZ)	55.7417
8	3	(New Zealand) Jason Richards	Tasman Motorsport	Holden Commodore (VZ)	55.7780
9	6	(Australia) Jason Bright	Ford Performance Racing	Ford Falcon (BA)	55.7830
10	67	(Australia) Paul Morris	Paul Morris Motorsport	Holden Commodore (VZ)	55.8406
11	88	(Australia) Steven Ellery	Triple Eight Race Engineering	Ford Falcon (BA)	55.8479
12	33	(Australia) Cameron McConville	Garry Rogers Motorsport	Holden Commodore (VZ)	55.8555
13	23	(Australia) Jamie Whincup	Tasman Motorsport	Holden Commodore (VZ)	55.8635
14	021	(New Zealand) Paul Radisich	Team Kiwi Racing	Holden Commodore (VZ)	55.8835
15	10	(Australia) Jason Bargwanna	Larkham Motorsport	Ford Falcon (BA)	55.9653
16	45	(Brazil) Max Wilson	Team Dynamik	Holden Commodore (VZ)	55.9842
17	15	(Australia) Rick Kelly	HSV Dealer Team	Holden Commodore (VZ)	56.0272
18	12	(Australia) John Bowe	Brad Jones Racing	Ford Falcon (BA)	56.0299
19	48	(Australia) David Besnard	WPS Racing	Ford Falcon (BA)	56.0397
20	22	(Australia) Todd Kelly	Holden Racing Team	Holden Commodore (VZ)	56.0513
21	18	(Australia) Glenn Seton	Dick Johnson Racing	Ford Falcon (BA)	56.0526
22	21	(Australia) Brad Jones	Brad Jones Racing	Ford Falcon (BA)	56.0632
23	17	(Australia) Steven Johnson	Dick Johnson Racing	Ford Falcon (BA)	56.0646
24	50	(Australia) Paul Weel	Paul Weel Racing	Holden Commodore (VZ)	56.1285
25	20	(Australia) Mark Winterbottom	Larkham Motorsport	Ford Falcon (BA)	56.1554
26	44	(New Zealand) Simon Wills	Team Dynamik	Holden Commodore (VZ)	56.6326
27	75	(Australia) Anthony Tratt	Paul Little Racing	Holden Commodore (VZ)	56.6915
28	8	(New Zealand) Craig Baird	WPS Racing	Ford Falcon (BA)	56.7966
29	34	(Australia) Andrew Jones	Garry Rogers Motorsport	Holden Commodore (VZ)	56.8393
EXC	5	(Australia) Greg Ritter	Ford Performance Racing	Ford Falcon (BA)	Excluded
EXC	16	(Australia) Garth Tander	HSV Dealer Team	Holden Commodore (VZ)	Excluded
EXC	52	(Australia) Matthew White	Britek Motorsport	Ford Falcon (BA)	Excluded

=== Top Ten Shootout ===
Garth Tander was excluded from the shootout after his team was found to be in breach of rules pertaining to working on car without permission from the Category Technical Director after qualifying.

Pos.	No.	Driver	Car	Team	Time
1	888	(Australia) Craig Lowndes	Triple Eight Race Engineering	Ford Falcon (BA)	55.7367
2	1	(Australia) Marcos Ambrose	Stone Brothers Racing	Ford Falcon (BA)	55.7986
3	11	(New Zealand) Steven Richards	Perkins Engineering	Holden Commodore (VZ)	55.8581
4	51	(New Zealand) Greg Murphy	Paul Weel Racing	Holden Commodore (VZ)	55.9581
5	9	(Australia) Russell Ingall	Stone Brothers Racing	Ford Falcon (BA)	56.1709
6	24	(Australia) Paul Dumbrell	Perkins Engineering	Holden Commodore (VZ)	56.1723
7	2	(Australia) Mark Skaife	Holden Racing Team	Holden Commodore (VZ)	56.1899
8	3	(New Zealand) Jason Richards	Tasman Motorsport	Holden Commodore (VZ)	56.4416
9	6	(Australia) Jason Bright	Ford Performance Racing	Ford Falcon (BA)	56.6558
EXC	16	(Australia) Garth Tander	HSV Dealer Team	Holden Commodore (VZ)	Excluded

=== Race 1 ===
There was a brief scare for Craig Lowndes preceding the race after a wheel nut issue almost caused him to start from the pitlane. The officials permitted Lowndes to exit pitlane however, and thus took up his position on the front row alongside Ambrose.

Both of the Ford heavyweights left the line side-by-side. Lowndes had crept ever so slightly before the green flag had dropped and this raised questions over whether he would incur a penalty. Before the stewards could intervene, contact between him and Ambrose at turn two resulted in a spin for Lowndes and sent him tumbling down the order. Steven Richards hesitated as Lowndes spun across his bows and Murphy capitalised to move up to second place. Ingall followed him through to shuffle Richards down to fourth. After climbing through the field from his rear-of-grid start, Tander spun at the hairpin and was left to start his climb all over again.

The pit window opened on lap six and drivers began peeling in to complete their mandatory stops. There was contact in the pitlane between Bowe and Besnard. Both drivers were able to continue. Ambrose began to exhibit oversteer and Murphy began ranging up behind the Pirtek Falcon. On lap eight, Murphy passed Ambrose for the lead into the hairpin. Immediately, Murphy peeled in to complete his mandatory stop. This tactic was meant to work as an undercut; to retain the lead ahead of Ambrose. It wouldn't matter however, as Ambrose was spun at the hairpin by Steven Richards. Richards sustained guard damage while Ambrose soldiered on. A couple laps later, Baird, Jason Bargwanna and Andrew Jones tangled at the same part of the track with each car sustaining damage. Baird and Bargwanna's damage was sufficient for them to withdraw from the race. The carnage at the hairpin continued with White tipping Anthony Tratt around. Tratt subsequently suffered major mechanical issues but managed to keep circulating until the very end. Jason Richards also fell off the circuit at the same part of the track a lap later after locking the rear brakes. Rick Kelly was then sent spinning around by Cameron McConville. For their respective incidents, Andrew Jones and White received drive-through penalties. Toward the end of the race, Simon Wills began to leak oil onto the track which caught out Glenn Seton, who had been running in the top ten, up to that point.

Ingall remained Murphy's closest pursuer with Skaife a couple seconds behind after the pitstop shuffle had concluded. This win would be Murphy's first at Pukekohe since 2003 and the car speed suggested he was in prime position to retain his dominance at the venue. Despite the calamity at the start of the race, neither Lowndes nor Ambrose incurred any penalties.

Pos.	No.	Driver	Team	Laps	Time	Grid
1	51	(New Zealand) Greg Murphy	Paul Weel Racing	36	34min 53.7573sec	4
2	9	(Australia) Russell Ingall	Stone Brothers Racing	36	+ 3.120	5
3	2	(Australia) Mark Skaife	Holden Racing Team	36	+ 4.673	7
4	88	(Australia) Steven Ellery	Triple Eight Race Engineering	36	+ 11.923	11
5	1	(Australia) Marcos Ambrose	Stone Brothers Racing	36	+ 14.876	2
6	021	(New Zealand) Paul Radisich	Team Kiwi Racing	36	+ 15.358	14
7	6	(Australia) Jason Bright	Ford Performance Racing	36	+ 15.815	9
8	22	(Australia) Todd Kelly	Holden Racing Team	36	+ 19.850	20
9	67	(Australia) Paul Morris	Paul Morris Motorsport	36	+ 27.800	10
10	23	(Australia) Jamie Whincup	Tasman Motorsport	36	+ 27.810	13
11	50	(Australia) Paul Weel	Paul Weel Racing	36	+ 35.843	24
12	12	(Australia) John Bowe	Brad Jones Racing	36	+ 36.196	18
13	17	(Australia) Steven Johnson	Dick Johnson Racing	36	+ 37.637	23
14	888	(Australia) Craig Lowndes	Triple Eight Race Engineering	36	+ 38.103	1
15	45	(Brazil) Max Wilson	Team Dynamik	36	+ 38.458	16
16	15	(Australia) Rick Kelly	HSV Dealer Team	36	+ 43.135	17
17	16	(Australia) Garth Tander	HSV Dealer Team	36	+ 43.241	31
18	3	(New Zealand) Jason Richards	Tasman Motorsport	36	+ 44.412	8
19	5	(Australia) Greg Ritter	Ford Performance Racing	36	+ 49.485	30
20	18	(Australia) Glenn Seton	Dick Johnson Racing	36	+ 54.380	21
21	33	(Australia) Cameron McConville	Garry Rogers Motorsport	36	+ 76.400	12
22	21	(Australia) Brad Jones	Brad Jones Racing	35	+ 1 lap	22
23	75	(Australia) Anthony Tratt	Paul Little Racing	35	+ 1 lap	27
24	20	(Australia) Mark Winterbottom	Larkham Motorsport	35	+ 1 lap	25
25	52	(Australia) Matthew White	Britek Motorsport	35	+ 1 lap	32
26	24	(Australia) Paul Dumbrell	Perkins Engineering	35	+ 1 lap	6
27	34	(Australia) Andrew Jones	Garry Rogers Motorsport	34	+ 2 laps	29
28	11	(New Zealand) Steven Richards	Perkins Engineering	32	+ 4 laps	3
29	48	(Australia) David Besnard	WPS Racing	32	+ 4 laps	19
30	44	(New Zealand) Simon Wills	Team Dynamik	30	+ 6 laps	26
Ret	8	(New Zealand) Craig Baird	WPS Racing	13	Accident	28
Ret	10	(Australia) Jason Bargwanna	Larkham Motorsport	13	Accident	15
Fastest lap: Greg Murphy (Paul Weel Racing), 0:56.0781

=== Race 2 ===
Ingall perfected his launch and shot off into the lead. Chaos ensued at turn three with Max Wilson cutting across the inside of the corner, crowding Lowndes into Steven Johnson and sent the Westpoint driver into a half-spin. Rick Kelly had broken his front-left suspension after contact with a car ahead of him.

Within a few laps, Murphy had closed in on Ingall, eventually passed him at the hairpin to take back the lead. A couple cars behind, Paul Radisich in the Team Kiwi Racing car had passed Steven Ellery for fourth, much to the adulation of the home crowd. Bowe completed his compulsory stop earlier than most and his desperation to remain on the lead lap meant Ingall was held up for the better part of a lap while Murphy extended his lead. Skaife attempted to pass Ingall into the hairpin but locked up enormously, sent himself into a spin, and retreated to the pitlane to complete his compulsory pitstop, changing only the passenger-side tyres. Murphy completed his stop on lap 15 which, as it turned out, was well timed.

A few laps later, Brad Jones and Andrew Jones made contact on the approach to Ford Mountain which sent the former into the barrier. The car impacted the barrier sideways which threw the car into the air, sent it into a roll, before coming to rest on the passenger side. Brad Jones was unhurt from this incident but, as one may expect, resulted in a safety car. Under said safety car, the carnage continued. A concertina effect at the end of the back straight, prompted by drivers failing to slow for yellow flags, saw Todd Kelly crash heavily into the rear of Paul Morris' car, as well as impacting the side of McConville's car, sending Kelly's car off the ground. Kelly retired due to the extensive damage sustained from this crash.

Whincup's woes continued with a crash at turn four. Besnard suffered multiple spins over the next few laps while White once again drew the ire of the officials; receiving a stop-and-hold penalty for pitlane speeding. He was able to keep the car running and got back in the race, finishing five laps down. Ambrose began to struggle with the handling of the car thanks to a broken anti-roll bar. Ingall passed him for second and set off after Murphy. He managed to whittle the gap down to under a second. But Murphy held on to win race two. Ambrose come home a lonely third with nearest competitor, Skaife, being over six seconds behind.

Pos.	No.	Driver	Team	Laps	Time	Grid
1	51	(New Zealand) Greg Murphy	Paul Weel Racing	50	52min 43.9734sec	1
2	9	(Australia) Russell Ingall	Stone Brothers Racing	50	+ 0.767	2
3	1	(Australia) Marcos Ambrose	Stone Brothers Racing	50	+ 5.310	5
4	2	(Australia) Mark Skaife	Holden Racing Team	50	+ 11.515	3
5	888	(Australia) Craig Lowndes	Triple Eight Race Engineering	50	+ 13.281	14
6	021	(New Zealand) Paul Radisich	Team Kiwi Racing	50	+ 14.093	6
7	88	(Australia) Steven Ellery	Triple Eight Race Engineering	50	+ 14.647	4
8	11	(New Zealand) Steven Richards	Perkins Engineering	50	+ 15.381	28
9	50	(Australia) Paul Weel	Paul Weel Racing	50	+ 18.586	11
10	12	(Australia) John Bowe	Brad Jones Racing	50	+ 24.349	12
11	6	(Australia) Jason Bright	Ford Performance Racing	59	+ 35.038	7
12	8	(New Zealand) Craig Baird	WPS Racing	50	+ 35.844	31
13	18	(Australia) Glenn Seton	Dick Johnson Racing	50	+ 37.954	20
14	10	(Australia) Jason Bargwanna	Larkham Motorsport	50	+ 41.751	32
15	45	(Brazil) Max Wilson	Team Dynamik	50	+ 42.827	15
16	24	(Australia) Paul Dumbrell	Perkins Engineering	50	+ 45.144	26
17	44	(Australia) Simon Wills	Team Dynamik	50	+ 46.572	30
18	33	(Australia) Cameron McConville	Garry Rogers Motorsport	50	+ 46.977	21
19	67	(Australia) Paul Morris	Paul Morris Motorsport	50	+ 47.562	9
20	16	(Australia) Garth Tander	HSV Dealer Team	50	+ 47.591	17
21	34	(Australia) Andrew Jones	Garry Rogers Motorsport	50	+ 54.745	27
22	20	(Australia) Mark Winterbottom	Larkham Motorsport	49	+ 1 lap	24
23	75	(Australia) Anthony Tratt	Paul Little Racing	49	+ 1 lap	23
24	5	(Australia) Greg Ritter	Ford Performance Racing	49	+ 1 lap	19
25	52	(Australia) Matthew White	Britek Motorsport	47	+ 3 laps	25
26	17	(Australia) Steven Johnson	Dick Johnson Racing	46	+ 4 laps	13
27	48	(Australia) David Besnard	WPS Racing	46	+ 4 laps	29
28	23	(Australia) Jamie Whincup	Tasman Motorsport	45	+ 5 laps	10
29	3	(New Zealand) Jason Richards	Tasman Motorsport	39	+ 11 laps	18
Ret	22	(Australia) Todd Kelly	Holden Racing Team	19	Accident	8
Ret	21	(Australia) Brad Jones	Brad Jones Racing	16	Accident	22
Ret	15	(Australia) Rick Kelly	HSV Dealer Team	7	Accident damage	16
Fastest lap: Greg Murphy (Paul Weel Racing), 0:56.2953

=== Race 3 ===
Murphy retained the lead into turn one while Ambrose and Lowndes collided yet again, sending the Pirtek Falcon onto the grass and losing positions to Radisich and Skaife. The former would then pass Lowndes for third, the crowd roaring in approval. Johnson was out almost immediately with broken suspension incurred when running into Tratt's car; barely being able to return his car to the garage. Ingall kept the pressure on Murphy in the opening laps. The two were separated however, when Bright emerged from the pitlane after completing his compulsory pitstop.

Besnard's weekend went from bad to worse. Retiring from the race after bizarre incident where both right-hand side tyres went flat on the approach to the hairpin. This prompted multiple drivers to dive into the pits. One of the bigger losers once the cycle was complete was Radisich, who was undercut by Lowndes and Skaife. Despite the clear danger in Besnard's stranded car, the officials did not deploy a safety car until a few laps later. It was a timely intervention as, just moments after the deployment, Bargwanna crashed into the barrier on the back straight after his steering rack had come adrift. The clouds looming overhead remained ominous. Rain was approaching the circuit. What wasn't known was whether it would reach it before the end of the race.

After an excessively long safety car period, the race got back underway. The droplets of water on the windshields on the cars suggested that the rain had indeed arrived. At the end of lap 31, the first person to have been trapped out by the lack of grip on the circuit was Ellery, who had gone sideways over Ford Mountain. He was followed by Whincup, who had an even closer encounter with the wall. As Whincup re-entered the circuit, this caused Baird to move over to the right-hand side of the circuit in order to give as much room to the corresponding vehicle. At this time however, Dumbrell was attempting an ambitious move up the inner circuit, but the diminishing gap left Dumbrell with nowhere to go. Dumbrell had initially clipped the side of Baird's car which set off a 'ricochet effect' where he then bounced off the wall and then back into Baird where he provided a significant hit to send both into a high-speed spin. Baird's car spun off toward the right-hand side of the circuit and collided with the wooden paddock fencing. Dumbrell meanwhile had spun toward the left-hand side of the circuit, colliding with the wall. In an attempt to avoid the stranded cars, McConville slewed sideways and swiped the barrier. All three cars, as well as the circuit, ended up with significant damage. The delay in repairing the circuit meant that the race was red-flagged.

Seeing as how 75% of the race distance had not yet been covered, the race couldn't be declared. Therefore the race was effectively 'paused' and delayed by nearly 30 minutes. As the cars pulled up on the grid to wait out the delay, crews rushed down to apply wet weather tyres. Once the track was given the all-clear and cars began to peel off for the restart formation lap, in a bizarre scene, both Triple Eight Falcons failed to fire up and were pushed from the grid. While Ellery eventually got going, Lowndes was out of the race. As per the rulebook, the previous 31 laps were declared null-and-void, with a 16-lap sprint being concocted to settle the results overall. There was confusion and conjecture as to whether the race would resume via a standing or rolling start. It was settled on a rolling start and the race would get back underway.

By the time the race resumed, darkness had enveloped the circuit. That, combined with the overcast conditions, meant broadcasters were barely able to pick up the cars on vision. Most cars had switched their headlights on to aid visibility. Some members of the crowd began to leave although most remained until the end. Despite a late charge from Ingall, Murphy crossed the line victorious while Steven Richards rounded out the podium.

Pos.	No.	Driver	Team	Laps	Time	Grid
1	51	(New Zealand) Greg Murphy	Paul Weel Racing	47	1hr 29min 16.4683sec	1
2	9	(Australia) Russell Ingall	Stone Brothers Racing	47	+ 0.760	2
3	11	(New Zealand) Steven Richards	Perkins Engineering	47	+ 1.782	8
4	1	(Australia) Marcos Ambrose	Stone Brothers Racing	47	+ 2.449	3
5	2	(Australia) Mark Skaife	Holden Racing Team	47	+ 6.056	4
6	021	(New Zealand) Paul Radisich	Team Kiwi Racing	47	+ 13.492	6
7	6	(Australia) Jason Bright	Ford Performance Racing	47	+ 13.631	11
8	12	(Australia) John Bowe	Brad Jones Racing	47	+ 14.192	10
9	16	(Australia) Garth Tander	HSV Dealer Team	47	+ 19.305	20
10	50	(Australia) Paul Weel	Paul Weel Racing	47	+ 19.810	9
11	23	(Australia) Jamie Whincup	Tasman Motorsport	47	+ 20.321	28
12	18	(Australia) Glenn Seton	Dick Johnson Racing	47	+ 21.492	13
13	22	(Australia) Todd Kelly	Holden Racing Team	47	+ 21.656	30
14	3	(New Zealand) Jason Richards	Tasman Motorsport	47	+ 22.501	29
15	15	(Australia) Rick Kelly	HSV Dealer Team	47	+ 22.617	32
16	67	(Australia) Paul Morris	Paul Morris Motorsport	47	+ 39.355	19
17	20	(Australia) Mark Winterbottom	Larkham Motorsport	47	+ 39.881	22
18	75	(Australia) Anthony Tratt	Paul Little Racing	47	+ 41.601	23
19	34	(Australia) Andrew Jones	Garry Rogers Motorsport	47	+ 1:00.323	21
20	21	(Australia) Brad Jones	Brad Jones Racing	47	+ 1:01.223	30
21	5	(Australia) Greg Ritter	Ford Performance Racing	46	+ 1 lap	24
22	88	(Australia) Steven Ellery	Triple Eight Race Engineering	46	+ 1 lap	7
Ret	52	(Australia) Matthew White	Britek Motorsport	35	Mechanical	25
Ret	888	(Australia) Craig Lowndes	Triple Eight Race Engineering	31	Ignition	5
Ret	8	(New Zealand) Craig Baird	WPS Racing	31	Accident	12
Ret	24	(Australia) Paul Dumbrell	Perkins Engineering	31	Accident	16
Ret	33	(Australia) Cameron McConville	Garry Rogers Motorsport	31	Accident	18
Ret	45	(Brazil) Max Wilson	Team Dynamik	17	Overheating	15
Ret	44	(New Zealand) Simon Wills	Team Dynamik	15	Retired	17
Ret	10	(Australia) Jason Bargwanna	Larkham Motorsport	12	Accident	14
Ret	48	(Australia) David Besnard	WPS Racing	7	Spun off	27
Ret	17	(Australia) Steven Johnson	Dick Johnson Racing	1	Suspension	26
Fastest lap: Mark Skaife (Holden Racing Team), 0:56.1478

== Aftermath ==
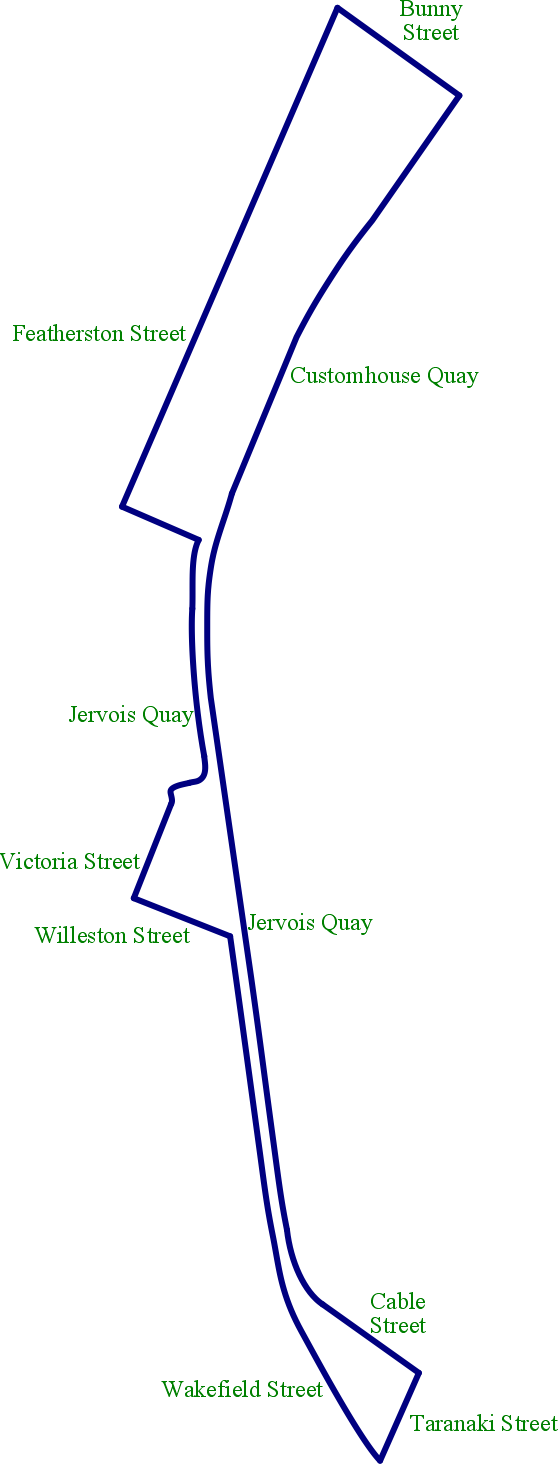
Proposed layout for the Wellington Street Race

It was unclear as to where the New Zealand round would be held in 2006. Despite confirmation that the event would switch to a street circuit in Auckland for 2006, the project had fallen through and would not take place. Millions of dollars were lost and a new home was sought. Pukekohe was a fallback option to return while efforts were afoot for a return to the streets of Wellington. After having previously failed to win over AVESCO officials in 2004, a revised proposal was set forth with a new track layout. However, an investigation instigated by Wellington Council deemed the proposal unfeasible and deemed the event would no longer fit in the waterfront area. The event reverted back to Pukekohe for 2006. Soon after, it was confirmed that the event would be moved to Hamilton for 2008.

Immediately after the round was complete, Ambrose headed for the United States to complete his first NASCAR test in anticipation for a full-time switch to the sport in 2006.

=== Championship standings ===
Pos.	No	Driver	Team	Pts
1	1	(Australia) Marcos Ambrose	Stone Brothers Racing	366
2	9	(Australia) Russell Ingall	Stone Brothers Racing	324
3	50	(Australia) Paul Weel	Paul Weel Racing	279
4	888	(Australia) Craig Lowndes	Triple Eight Race Engineering	277
5	51	(New Zealand) Greg Murphy	Paul Weel Racing	273
