= 2008 V8 Supercars Eastern Creek round =

2008 Supercar Championship event

(New South Wales) 2008 Eastern Creek round of the V8 Supercar Championship
Event Information
- Round 2 of 14 in the 2008 V8 Supercar Championship Series
- Date: 7–9 March 2008
- Location: Eastern Creek, New South Wales
- Venue: Eastern Creek Raceway
- Weather: Fine

Results
Race 1
Distance	31 laps	120 km
Pole position	Garth Tander; Holden Racing Team	1:32.1080
Winner	Garth Tander; Holden Racing Team	50:19.8503
Race 2
Distance	31 laps	120 km
Winner	Will Davison; Dick Johnson Racing	50:13.7164
Race 3
Distance	31 laps	120 km
Winner	Mark Winterbottom; Ford Performance Racing	1:03:42.6526
Round Results
First	Will Davison; Dick Johnson Racing	260 pts
Second	Mark Winterbottom; Ford Performance Racing	244 pts
Third	Garth Tander; Holden Racing Team	242 pts

The 2008 Eastern Creek round of the V8 Supercar Championship was the second round of the Australian 2008 V8 Supercar season. It was held on the weekend of 7 to 9 March at Eastern Creek Raceway, in the outer suburbs of Sydney, the capital of New South Wales.

== Qualifying ==
Qualifying was held on Saturday 8 March. The Holden Racing Team secured the front row, Garth Tander taking the pole from Mark Skaife. It was Tander first pole position for his new team. Rick Kelly made a 1-2-3 for the extended Walkinshaw Performance operation with series leader Jamie Whincup the leading Ford in fourth place.

== Race 1 ==
Race 1 was held on Saturday 8 March. After the race both Paul Dumbrell and Paul Morris were both relegated five finishing positions for driving infringements.

== Race 2 ==
Race 2 was held on Sunday 9 March. Will Davison scores his debut V8 Supercar race win, his first win since the British Formula 3 Championship.

== Race 3 ==
Race 3 was held on Sunday 9 March. With a sixth-place finish in the third race to back up the second and first from the first two race Will Davison scored his debut round victory, the first for the Jim Beam Racing team since the 2001 Queensland 500. The field was bunched together at the finish after a late race safety car period after a tyre failure caused Steven Richards to crash his Falcon into the barriers at 150 km/h. The car was destroyed and the team had to revert to a spare for the next race, the Grand Prix support event at Albert Park.

== Results ==
Results as follows:

=== Qualifying ===
Pos	No	Name	Car	Team	Part 3	Part 2	Part 1
1	1	(Australia) Garth Tander	Holden Commodore (VE)	Holden Racing Team	1:32.1080		
2	2	(Australia) Mark Skaife	Holden Commodore (VE)	Holden Racing Team	1:32.2926		
3	15	(Australia) Rick Kelly	Holden Commodore (VE)	HSV Dealer Team	1:32.4431		
4	88	(Australia) Jamie Whincup	Ford Falcon (BF)	Triple Eight Race Engineering	1:32.5097		
5	14	(Australia) Cameron McConville	Holden Commodore (VE)	Brad Jones Racing	1:32.7130		
6	18	(Australia) Will Davison	Ford Falcon (BF)	Dick Johnson Racing	1:32.7527		
7	4	(Australia) James Courtney	Ford Falcon (BF)	Stone Brothers Racing	1:32.7706		
8	33	(Australia) Lee Holdsworth	Holden Commodore (VE)	Garry Rogers Motorsport	1:32.8409		
9	16	(Australia) Paul Dumbrell	Holden Commodore (VE)	HSV Dealer Team	1:33.4414		
10	9	(New Zealand) Shane van Gisbergen	Ford Falcon (BF)	Stone Brothers Racing	1:33.5298		
11	888	(Australia) Craig Lowndes	Ford Falcon (BF)	Triple Eight Race Engineering		1:32.9004	
12	3	(New Zealand) Jason Richards	Holden Commodore (VE)	Tasman Motorsport		1:32.9008	
13	51	(New Zealand) Greg Murphy	Holden Commodore (VE)	Tasman Motorsport		1:32.9631	
14	111	(New Zealand) Fabian Coulthard	Ford Falcon (BF)	Paul Cruickshank Racing		1:33.1648	
15	5	(Australia) Mark Winterbottom	Ford Falcon (BF)	Ford Performance Racing		1:33.2059	
16	17	(Australia) Steven Johnson	Ford Falcon (BF)	Dick Johnson Racing		1:33.2060	
17	25	(Australia) Jason Bright	Ford Falcon (BF)	Britek Motorsport		1:33.2151	
18	7	(Australia) Todd Kelly	Holden Commodore (VE)	Perkins Engineering		1:33.2217	
19	6	(New Zealand) Steven Richards	Ford Falcon (BF)	Ford Performance Racing		1:33.2417	
20	11	(Australia) Shane Price	Holden Commodore (VE)	Perkins Engineering		1:33.5257	
21	12	(Australia) Andrew Jones	Holden Commodore (VE)	Brad Jones Racing			1:33.4211
22	39	(Australia) Russell Ingall	Holden Commodore (VE)	Paul Morris Motorsport			1:33.4562
23	34	(Australia) Michael Caruso	Holden Commodore (VE)	Garry Rogers Motorsport			1:33.5276
24	55	(Australia) Tony D'Alberto	Holden Commodore (VE)	Rod Nash Racing			1:33.6992
25	67	(Australia) Paul Morris	Holden Commodore (VE)	Paul Morris Motorsport			1:33.7036
26	50	(Australia) Andrew Thompson	Holden Commodore (VE)	Paul Weel Racing			1:34.1044
27	021	(New Zealand) Chris Pither	Ford Falcon (BF)	Team Kiwi Racing			1:34.3881
28	26	(Australia) Marcus Marshall	Ford Falcon (BF)	Britek Motorsport			1:34.7003

=== Race 1 results ===
Pos	No	Name	Team	Vehicle	Laps	Time/Retired	Grid	Points
1	1	(Australia) Garth Tander	Holden Racing Team	Holden Commodore (VE)	31	50:19.8503	1	100
2	18	(Australia) Will Davison	Dick Johnson Racing	Ford Falcon (BF)	31	+6.4s	6	92
3	88	(Australia) Jamie Whincup	Triple Eight Race Engineering	Ford Falcon (BF)	31	+7.2s	4	86
4	15	(Australia) Rick Kelly	HSV Dealer Team	Holden Commodore (VE)	31	+9.4s	3	80
5	4	(Australia) James Courtney	Stone Brothers Racing	Ford Falcon (BF)	31	+10.9s	7	74
6	2	(Australia) Mark Skaife	Holden Racing Team	Holden Commodore (VE)	31	+14.0s	2	68
7	888	(Australia) Craig Lowndes	Triple Eight Race Engineering	Ford Falcon (BF)	31	+14.6s	11	64
8	33	(Australia) Lee Holdsworth	Garry Rogers Motorsport	Holden Commodore (VE)	31	+15.8s	8	60
9	51	(New Zealand) Greg Murphy	Tasman Motorsport	Holden Commodore (VE)	31	+19.3s	13	56
10	5	(Australia) Mark Winterbottom	Ford Performance Racing	Ford Falcon (BF)	31	+19.6s	15	52
11	39	(Australia) Russell Ingall	Paul Morris Motorsport	Holden Commodore (VE)	31	+37.3s	22	48
12	3	(New Zealand) Jason Richards	Tasman Motorsport	Holden Commodore (VE)	31	+38.6s	12	46
13	7	(Australia) Todd Kelly	Perkins Engineering	Holden Commodore (VE)	31	+41.8s	18	44
14	111	(New Zealand) Fabian Coulthard	Paul Cruickshank Racing	Ford Falcon (BF)	31	+44.9s	14	42
15	14	(Australia) Cameron McConville	Brad Jones Racing	Holden Commodore (VE)	31	+47.2s	5	40
16	16	(Australia) Paul Dumbrell	HSV Dealer Team	Holden Commodore (VE)	31	+36.5s	9	38
17	9	(New Zealand) Shane van Gisbergen	Stone Brothers Racing	Ford Falcon (BF)	31	+47.5s	10	36
18	67	(Australia) Paul Morris	Paul Morris Motorsport	Holden Commodore (VE)	31	+40.2s	25	34
19	11	(Australia) Shane Price	Perkins Engineering	Holden Commodore (VE)	31	+48.5s	20	32
20	25	(Australia) Jason Bright	Britek Motorsport	Ford Falcon (BF)	31	+50.2s	17	30
21	17	(Australia) Steven Johnson	Dick Johnson Racing	Ford Falcon (BF)	31	+50.3s	16	28
22	12	(Australia) Andrew Jones	Brad Jones Racing	Holden Commodore (VE)	31	+52.8s	21	26
23	55	(Australia) Tony D'Alberto	Rod Nash Racing	Holden Commodore (VE)	31	+53.8s	24	24
24	50	(Australia) Andrew Thompson	Paul Weel Racing	Holden Commodore (VE)	31	+72.4s	26	22
25	34	(Australia) Michael Caruso	Garry Rogers Motorsport	Holden Commodore (VE)	31	+88.7s	23	20
26	26	(Australia) Marcus Marshall	Britek Motorsport	Ford Falcon (BF)	30	+ 1 lap	28	18
27	6	(New Zealand) Steven Richards	Ford Performance Racing	Ford Falcon (BF)	30	+ 1 lap	19	16
28	021	(New Zealand) Chris Pither	Team Kiwi Racing	Ford Falcon (BF)	30	+ 1 lap	27	14
Fastest Lap: Garth Tander (Holden Racing Team) - 1:34.5833 on lap 3

=== Race 2 ===
Pos	No	Name	Team	Vehicle	Laps	Time/Retired	Grid	Points
1	18	(Australia) Will Davison	Dick Johnson Racing	Ford Falcon (BF)	31	50:13.7164	2	100
2	5	(Australia) Mark Winterbottom	Ford Performance Racing	Ford Falcon (BF)	31	+2.6s	10	92
3	888	(Australia) Craig Lowndes	Triple Eight Race Engineering	Ford Falcon (BF)	31	+7.8s	7	86
4	39	(Australia) Russell Ingall	Paul Morris Motorsport	Holden Commodore (VE)	31	+17.3s	11	80
5	88	(Australia) Jamie Whincup	Triple Eight Race Engineering	Ford Falcon (BF)	31	+17.6s	3	74
6	15	(Australia) Rick Kelly	HSV Dealer Team	Holden Commodore (VE)	31	+22.2s	4	68
7	6	(New Zealand) Steven Richards	Ford Performance Racing	Ford Falcon (BF)	31	+22.9s	27	64
8	33	(Australia) Lee Holdsworth	Garry Rogers Motorsport	Holden Commodore (VE)	31	+25.1s	8	60
9	1	(Australia) Garth Tander	Holden Racing Team	Holden Commodore (VE)	31	+26.2s	1	56
10	67	(Australia) Paul Morris	Paul Morris Motorsport	Holden Commodore (VE)	31	+42.3196s	18	52
11	51	(New Zealand) Greg Murphy	Tasman Motorsport	Holden Commodore (VE)	31	+40.3s	9	48
12	16	(Australia) Paul Dumbrell	HSV Dealer Team	Holden Commodore (VE)	31	+41.5s	16	46
13	7	(Australia) Todd Kelly	Perkins Engineering	Holden Commodore (VE)	31	+45.0s	13	44
14	2	(Australia) Mark Skaife	Holden Racing Team	Holden Commodore (VE)	31	+46.1s	6	42
15	4	(Australia) James Courtney	Stone Brothers Racing	Ford Falcon (BF)	55	+47.9s	5	40
16	3	(New Zealand) Jason Richards	Tasman Motorsport	Holden Commodore (VE)	31	+49.4s	12	38
17	111	(New Zealand) Fabian Coulthard	Paul Cruickshank Racing	Ford Falcon (BF)	31	+50.7s	14	36
18	14	(Australia) Cameron McConville	Brad Jones Racing	Holden Commodore (VE)	31	+51.8s	15	34
19	17	(Australia) Steven Johnson	Dick Johnson Racing	Ford Falcon (BF)	31	+52.0s	21	32
20	55	(Australia) Tony D'Alberto	Rod Nash Racing	Holden Commodore (VE)	31	+59.6s	23	30
21	11	(Australia) Shane Price	Perkins Engineering	Holden Commodore (VE)	31	+60.4s	19	28
22	25	(Australia) Jason Bright	Britek Motorsport	Ford Falcon (BF)	31	+63.4s	20	26
23	12	(Australia) Andrew Jones	Brad Jones Racing	Holden Commodore (VE)	31	+64.3s	22	24
24	50	(Australia) Andrew Thompson	Paul Weel Racing	Holden Commodore (VE)	31	+66.3s	24	22
25	021	(New Zealand) Chris Pither	Team Kiwi Racing	Ford Falcon (BF)	31	+83.7s	28	20
26	34	(Australia) Michael Caruso	Garry Rogers Motorsport	Holden Commodore (VE)	31	+112.0s	25	18
27	9	(New Zealand) Shane van Gisbergen	Stone Brothers Racing	Ford Falcon (BF)	26	+ 5 laps	17	16
Ret	26	(Australia) Marcus Marshall	Britek Motorsport	Ford Falcon (BF)	29	Retired	26	
Fastest Lap: Mark Winterbottom (Ford Performance Racing) - 1:34.1301 on lap 3

=== Race 3 ===
Pos	No	Name	Team	Vehicle	Laps	Time/Retired	Grid	Points
1	5	(Australia) Mark Winterbottom	Ford Performance Racing	Ford Falcon (BF)	31	1:03:42.6526	2	100
2	15	(Australia) Rick Kelly	HSV Dealer Team	Holden Commodore (VE)	31	+0.8s	6	92
3	1	(Australia) Garth Tander	Holden Racing Team	Holden Commodore (VE)	31	+2.2s	9	86
4	88	(Australia) Jamie Whincup	Triple Eight Race Engineering	Ford Falcon (BF)	31	+2.4s	5	80
5	2	(Australia) Mark Skaife	Holden Racing Team	Holden Commodore (VE)	31	+2.5s	14	74
6	18	(Australia) Will Davison	Dick Johnson Racing	Ford Falcon (BF)	31	+3.6s	1	68
7	39	(Australia) Russell Ingall	Paul Morris Motorsport	Holden Commodore (VE)	31	+17.3s	4	64
8	888	(Australia) Craig Lowndes	Triple Eight Race Engineering	Ford Falcon (BF)	31	+4.4s	3	60
9	16	(Australia) Paul Dumbrell	HSV Dealer Team	Holden Commodore (VE)	31	+4.8s	12	56
10	51	(New Zealand) Greg Murphy	Tasman Motorsport	Holden Commodore (VE)	31	+5.2s	11	52
11	33	(Australia) Lee Holdsworth	Garry Rogers Motorsport	Holden Commodore (VE)	31	+5.6s	8	48
12	14	(Australia) Cameron McConville	Brad Jones Racing	Holden Commodore (VE)	31	+6.0s	18	46
13	50	(Australia) Andrew Thompson	Paul Weel Racing	Holden Commodore (VE)	31	+7.1s	24	44
14	34	(Australia) Michael Caruso	Garry Rogers Motorsport	Holden Commodore (VE)	31	+7.5s	25	42
15	7	(Australia) Todd Kelly	Perkins Engineering	Holden Commodore (VE)	31	+7.6s	13	40
16	111	(New Zealand) Fabian Coulthard	Paul Cruickshank Racing	Ford Falcon (BF)	31	+8.6s	17	38
17	9	(New Zealand) Shane van Gisbergen	Stone Brothers Racing	Ford Falcon (BF)	31	+9.1s	27	36
18	17	(Australia) Steven Johnson	Dick Johnson Racing	Ford Falcon (BF)	31	+9.2s	19	34
19	3	(New Zealand) Jason Richards	Tasman Motorsport	Holden Commodore (VE)	31	+9.6s	16	32
20	25	(Australia) Jason Bright	Britek Motorsport	Ford Falcon (BF)	31	+10.1s	22	30
21	11	(Australia) Shane Price	Perkins Engineering	Holden Commodore (VE)	31	+11.1s	21	28
22	26	(Australia) Marcus Marshall	Britek Motorsport	Ford Falcon (BF)	1	+11.7s	28	26
23	021	(New Zealand) Chris Pither	Team Kiwi Racing	Ford Falcon (BF)	31	+18.6s	25	24
Ret	6	(New Zealand) Steven Richards	Ford Performance Racing	Ford Falcon (BF)	23	Accident	7	
Ret	12	(Australia) Andrew Jones	Brad Jones Racing	Holden Commodore (VE)	6	Retired	23	
Ret	67	(Australia) Paul Morris	Paul Morris Motorsport	Holden Commodore (VE)	1	Accident	10	
Ret	4	(Australia) James Courtney	Stone Brothers Racing	Ford Falcon (BF)	1	Accident	15	
Ret	55	(Australia) Tony D'Alberto	Rod Nash Racing	Holden Commodore (VE)	0	Accident	20	
Fastest Lap: Rick Kelly (HSV Dealer Team) - 1:34.0983 on lap 10

== Standings ==
After round 2 of 14

Pos	No	Name	Team	Points
1	88	(Australia) Jamie Whincup	Triple Eight Race Engineering	540
2	15	(Australia) Rick Kelly	HSV Dealer Team	432
3	33	(Australia) Lee Holdsworth	Garry Rogers Motorsport	426
4	5	(Australia) Mark Winterbottom	Ford Performance Racing	382
5	18	(Australia) Will Davison	Dick Johnson Racing	356
