= Autobarn Racing =

There are several motor racing teams which have been called Autobarn Racing.

- Rod Nash Racing - Autobarn Racing identity from 2006 to 2007.
- HSV Dealer Team - Autobarn Racing identity from 2008.
- Walkinshaw Racing - Autobarn Racing identity from 2009.
- Triple Eight Race Engineering - Autobarn Lowndes Racing identity from 2018.
