= 2005 Adelaide 500 =

2005 Supercar Championship event

(South Australia) 2005 Adelaide 500
Event Information
- Round 1 of 13 in the 2005 V8 Supercar Championship Series
- Date: 17–20 March 2005
- Location: Adelaide, South Australia
- Venue: Adelaide Street Circuit
- Weather: Fine

Results
Race 1
Distance	78 laps	250 km
Pole position	Rick Kelly; HSV Dealer Team	1:22.9438
Winner	Marcos Ambrose; Stone Brothers Racing	2:06:56.4343
Race 2
Distance	78 laps	250 km
Winner	Marcos Ambrose; Stone Brothers Racing	1:59:11.1013
Round Results
First	Marcos Ambrose; Stone Brothers Racing	192 pts
Second	Craig Lowndes; Triple Eight Race Engineering	183 pts
Third	Mark Skaife; Holden Racing Team	90 pts

The 2005 Adelaide 500 (known for naming rights reasons as the 2005 Clipsal 500 Adelaide) was a motor race for V8 Supercars held on the weekend of 17 to 20 March 2005. The event was held at the Adelaide Street Circuit in Adelaide, South Australia, and consisted of two races of 250 kilometres in length. It was the first round of thirteen in the 2005 V8 Supercar Championship Series.

Marcos Ambrose kicked off his title defense in dominant fashion by winning both races en route to claiming overall round honours. Ambrose claimed maximum points from the weekend while Craig Lowndes finished second overall in his first outing for Triple Eight Race Engineering. Mark Skaife recovered from a turbulent Saturday which involved a retirement from race one to finish third overall on Sunday.

On the leadup to the weekend, Ambrose shocked the paddock by announcing his intention to leave the series at the end of the year to pursue a career in NASCAR in the United States.

== Background ==
The event was held on the weekend of 17 to 20 March 2005. It was the sixth running of the Adelaide 500 event and consisted of two 250 km races with compulsory pitstops in each.

=== Entry list ===
There were 34 drivers entered into the event. It featured mixture of vehicle models - sixteen BA Falcon's, six VY Commodore's, and twelve VZ Commodore's.

== Race report ==
=== Qualifying ===
Pos.	No.	Driver	Team	Car	Time
1	1	(Australia) Marcos Ambrose	Stone Brothers Racing	Ford Falcon (BA)	1:22.1776
2	021	(New Zealand) Paul Radisich	Team Kiwi Racing	Holden Commodore (VZ)	1:22.5300
3	88	(Australia) Steven Ellery	Triple Eight Race Engineering	Ford Falcon (BA)	1:22.5446
4	888	(Australia) Craig Lowndes	Triple Eight Race Engineering	Ford Falcon (BA)	1:22.5609
5	6	(Australia) Jason Bright	Ford Performance Racing	Ford Falcon (BA)	1:22.5692
6	15	(Australia) Rick Kelly	HSV Dealer Team	Holden Commodore (VZ)	1:22.6948
7	11	(New Zealand) Steven Richards	Perkins Engineering	Holden Commodore (VZ)	1:22.7015
8	51	(New Zealand) Greg Murphy	Paul Weel Racing	Holden Commodore (VZ)	1:22.7666
9	9	(Australia) Russell Ingall	Stone Brothers Racing	Ford Falcon (BA)	1:22.8108
10	2	(Australia) Mark Skaife	Holden Racing Team	Holden Commodore (VZ)	1:22.8235
11	12	(Australia) John Bowe	Brad Jones Racing	Ford Falcon (BA)	1:22.9277
12	33	(Australia) Cameron McConville	Garry Rogers Motorsport	Holden Commodore (VZ)	1:22.9389
13	17	(Australia) Steven Johnson	Dick Johnson Racing	Ford Falcon (BA)	1:22.9791
14	24	(Australia) Paul Dumbrell	Perkins Engineering	Holden Commodore (VZ)	1:23.0073
15	22	(Australia) Todd Kelly	Holden Racing Team	Holden Commodore (VZ)	1:23.0607
16	44	(New Zealand) Simon Wills	Team Dynamik	Holden Commodore (VZ)	1:23.0889
17	23	(Australia) Jamie Whincup	Tasman Motorsport	Holden Commodore (VZ)	1:23.1801
18	16	(Australia) Garth Tander	HSV Dealer Team	Holden Commodore (VZ)	1:23.2143
19	67	(Australia) Paul Morris	Paul Morris Motorsport	Holden Commodore (VZ)	1:23.2405
20	20	(Australia) Mark Winterbottom	Larkham Motorsport	Ford Falcon (BA)	1:23.2601
21	21	(Australia) Brad Jones	Brad Jones Racing	Ford Falcon (BA)	1:23.3289
22	48	(Australia) David Besnard	WPS Racing	Ford Falcon (BA)	1:23.3663
23	10	(Australia) Jason Bargwanna	Larkham Motorsport	Ford Falcon (BA)	1:23.3955
24	18	(Australia) Glenn Seton	Dick Johnson Racing	Ford Falcon (BA)	1:23.4013
25	75	(Australia) Anthony Tratt	Paul Little Racing	Holden Commodore (VZ)	1:23.5881
26	5	(Australia) Greg Ritter	Ford Performance Racing	Ford Falcon (BA)	1:23.6424
27	50	(Australia) Paul Weel	Paul Weel Racing	Holden Commodore (VZ)	1:23.6548
28	3	(New Zealand) Jason Richards	Tasman Motorsport	Holden Commodore (VZ)	1:23.7219
29	34	(Australia) Andrew Jones	Garry Rogers Motorsport	Holden Commodore (VZ)	1:23.8982
30	25	(Australia) Steve Owen	Britek Motorsport	Ford Falcon (BA)	1:23.9342
31	7	(Australia) Alex Davison	Perkins Engineering	Holden Commodore (VZ)	1:23.9380
32	8	(New Zealand) Craig Baird	WPS Racing	Ford Falcon (BA)	1:24.2139
33	52	(Australia) Matthew White	Britek Motorsport	Ford Falcon (BA)	1:24.3102
-	45	(Brazil) Max Wilson	Team Dynamik	Holden Commodore (VZ)	no time

=== Top Ten Shootout ===
Pos.	No.	Driver	Team	Car	Time
1	15	(Australia) Rick Kelly	HSV Dealer Team	Holden Commodore (VZ)	1:22.9438
2	1	(Australia) Marcos Ambrose	Stone Brothers Racing	Ford Falcon (BA)	1:23.0490
3	88	(Australia) Steven Ellery	Triple Eight Race Engineering	Ford Falcon (BA)	1:23.1918
4	9	(Australia) Russell Ingall	Stone Brothers Racing	Ford Falcon (BA)	1:23.2425
5	51	(New Zealand) Greg Murphy	Paul Weel Racing	Holden Commodore (VZ)	1:23.4958
6	11	(New Zealand) Steven Richards	Perkins Engineering	Holden Commodore (VZ)	1:23.5888
7	888	(Australia) Craig Lowndes	Triple Eight Race Engineering	Ford Falcon (BA)	1:23.7449
8	021	(New Zealand) Paul Radisich	Team Kiwi Racing	Holden Commodore (VZ)	1:24.0786
-	2	(Australia) Mark Skaife	Holden Racing Team	Holden Commodore (VZ)	no time
EXC	6	(Australia) Jason Bright	Ford Performance Racing	Ford Falcon (BA)	time disallowed

=== Race 1 ===
Pos.	No.	Driver	Team	Vehicle	Laps	Time	Grid
1	1	(Australia) Marcos Ambrose	Stone Brothers Racing	Ford Falcon (BA)	78	2hr 06min 56.4343sec	2
2	9	(Australia) Russell Ingall	Stone Brothers Racing	Ford Falcon (BA)	78	+ 0.833	4
3	888	(Australia) Craig Lowndes	Triple Eight Race Engineering	Ford Falcon (BA)	78	+ 2.996	7
4	17	(Australia) Steven Johnson	Dick Johnson Racing	Ford Falcon (BA)	78	+ 11.094	13
5	11	(New Zealand) Steven Richards	Perkins Engineering	Holden Commodore (VY)	78	+ 11.773	6
6	51	(New Zealand) Greg Murphy	Paul Weel Racing	Holden Commodore (VZ)	78	+ 12.990	5
7	16	(Australia) Garth Tander	HSV Dealer Team	Holden Commodore (VZ)	78	+ 15.738	18
8	22	(Australia) Todd Kelly	Holden Racing Team	Holden Commodore (VZ)	78	+ 20.604	15
9	18	(Australia) Glenn Seton	Dick Johnson Racing	Ford Falcon (BA)	78	+ 22.540	24
10	23	(Australia) Jamie Whincup	Tasman Motorsport	Holden Commodore (VY)	78	+ 22.914	17
11	50	(Australia) Paul Weel	Paul Weel Racing	Holden Commodore (VZ)	78	+ 24.136	27
12	12	(Australia) John Bowe	Brad Jones Racing	Ford Falcon (BA)	78	+ 24.590	11
13	21	(Australia) Brad Jones	Brad Jones Racing	Ford Falcon (BA)	78	+ 26.038	21
14	67	(Australia) Paul Morris	Paul Morris Motorsport	Holden Commodore (VZ)	78	+ 47.192	19
15	15	(Australia) Rick Kelly	HSV Dealer Team	Holden Commodore (VZ)	78	+ 47.233	1
16	24	(Australia) Paul Dumbrell	Perkins Engineering	Holden Commodore (VY)	78	+ 49.881	14
17	33	(Australia) Cameron McConville	Garry Rogers Motorsport	Holden Commodore (VZ)	78	+ 1:35.880	12
18	48	(Australia) David Besnard	WPS Racing	Ford Falcon (BA)	77	+ 1 lap	22
19	6	(Australia) Jason Bright	Ford Performance Racing	Ford Falcon (BA)	77	+ 1 lap	10
20	3	(New Zealand) Jason Richards	Tasman Motorsport	Holden Commodore (VY)	76	+ 2 laps	28
21	75	(Australia) Anthony Tratt	Paul Little Racing	Holden Commodore (VY)	76	+ 2 laps	25
22	34	(Australia) Andrew Jones	Garry Rogers Motorsport	Holden Commodore (VZ)	75	+ 3 laps	29
23	021	(New Zealand) Paul Radisich	Team Kiwi Racing	Holden Commodore (VZ)	72	+ 6 laps	8
24	20	(Australia) Mark Winterbottom	Larkham Motorsport	Ford Falcon (BA)	67	+ 11 laps	20
25	25	(Australia) Steve Owen	Britek Motorsport	Ford Falcon (BA)	64	+ 14 laps	30
Ret	52	(Australia) Matthew White	Britek Motorsport	Ford Falcon (BA)	71	Retired	33
Ret	7	(Australia) Alex Davison	Perkins Engineering	Holden Commodore (VY)	60	Retired	31
Ret	44	(New Zealand) Simon Wills	Team Dynamik	Holden Commodore (VZ)	58	Retired	16
Ret	45	(Brazil) Max Wilson	Team Dynamik	Holden Commodore (VZ)	56	Retired	34
Ret	10	(Australia) Jason Bargwanna	Larkham Motorsport	Ford Falcon (BA)	51	Retired	23
Ret	5	(Australia) Greg Ritter	Ford Performance Racing	Ford Falcon (BA)	48	Retired	26
Ret	8	(New Zealand) Craig Baird	WPS Racing	Ford Falcon (BA)	31	Retired	32
Ret	88	(Australia) Steven Ellery	Triple Eight Race Engineering	Ford Falcon (BA)	20	Accident	3
Ret	2	(Australia) Mark Skaife	Holden Racing Team	Holden Commodore (VZ)	16	Retired	9
Fastest Lap: Mark Skaife (Holden Racing Team) - 1:23.1903 on lap 15

=== Race 2 ===
Pos.	No.	Driver	Team	Vehicle	Laps	Time	Grid
1	1	(Australia) Marcos Ambrose	Stone Brothers Racing	Ford Falcon (BA)	78	1hr 59min 11.1013sec	1
2	888	(Australia) Craig Lowndes	Triple Eight Race Engineering	Ford Falcon (BA)	78	+ 6.360	3
3	2	(Australia) Mark Skaife	Holden Racing Team	Holden Commodore (VZ)	78	+ 6.811	34
4	22	(Australia) Todd Kelly	Holden Racing Team	Holden Commodore (VZ)	78	+ 22.280	8
5	24	(Australia) Paul Dumbrell	Perkins Engineering	Holden Commodore (VY)	78	+ 26.588	16
6	33	(Australia) Cameron McConville	Garry Rogers Motorsport	Holden Commodore (VZ)	78	+ 27.149	17
7	45	(Brazil) Max Wilson	Team Dynamik	Holden Commodore (VZ)	78	+ 29.762	29
8	50	(Australia) Paul Weel	Paul Weel Racing	Holden Commodore (VZ)	78	+ 36.893	11
9	15	(Australia) Rick Kelly	HSV Dealer Team	Holden Commodore (VZ)	78	+ 40.221	15
10	021	(New Zealand) Paul Radisich	Team Kiwi Racing	Holden Commodore (VZ)	78	+ 43.457	23
11	6	(Australia) Jason Bright	Ford Performance Racing	Ford Falcon (BA)	78	+ 43.533	19
12	52	(Australia) Matthew White	Britek Motorsport	Ford Falcon (BA)	78	+ 50.560	26
13	25	(Australia) Steve Owen	Britek Motorsport	Ford Falcon (BA)	78	+ 1:05.929	25
14	20	(Australia) Mark Winterbottom	Larkham Motorsport	Ford Falcon (BA)	78	+ 1:07.633	24
15	17	(Australia) Steven Johnson	Dick Johnson Racing	Ford Falcon (BA)	78	+ 1:13.830	4
16	67	(Australia) Paul Morris	Paul Morris Motorsport	Holden Commodore (VZ)	78	+ 1:16.763	14
17	8	(New Zealand) Craig Baird	WPS Racing	Ford Falcon (BA)	77	+ 1 lap	32
18	9	(Australia) Russell Ingall	Stone Brothers Racing	Ford Falcon (BA)	77	+ 1 lap	2
19	44	(New Zealand) Simon Wills	Team Dynamik	Holden Commodore (VZ)	77	+ 1 lap	28
20	21	(Australia) Brad Jones	Brad Jones Racing	Ford Falcon (BA)	75	+ 3 laps	13
21	7	(Australia) Alex Davison	Perkins Engineering	Holden Commodore (VY)	75	+ 3 laps	27
22	23	(Australia) Jamie Whincup	Tasman Motorsport	Holden Commodore (VY)	75	+ 3 laps	10
23	48	(Australia) David Besnard	WPS Racing	Ford Falcon (BA)	75	+ 3 laps	18
24	75	(Australia) Anthony Tratt	Paul Little Racing	Holden Commodore (VY)	74	+ 4 laps	21
25	18	(Australia) Glenn Seton	Dick Johnson Racing	Ford Falcon (BA)	71	+ 7 laps	9
26	11	(Australia) Steven Richards	Perkins Engineering	Holden Commodore (VY)	69	+ 9 laps	5
27	34	(Australia) Andrew Jones	Garry Rogers Motorsport	Holden Commodore (VZ)	66	+ 12 laps	22
Ret	12	(Australia) John Bowe	Brad Jones Racing	Ford Falcon (BA)	68	Retired	12
Ret	5	(Australia) Greg Ritter	Ford Performance Racing	Ford Falcon (BA)	52	Retired	31
Ret	3	(New Zealand) Jason Richards	Tasman Motorsport	Holden Commodore (VY)	52	Retired	20
Ret	10	(Australia) Jason Bargwanna	Larkham Motorsport	Ford Falcon (BA)	48	Retired	30
Ret	16	(Australia) Garth Tander	HSV Dealer Team	Holden Commodore (VZ)	14	Retired	7
Ret	51	(New Zealand) Greg Murphy	Paul Weel Racing	Holden Commodore (VZ)	7	Retired	6
DNS	88	(Australia) Steven Ellery	Triple Eight Race Engineering	Ford Falcon (BA)	0	Did not start	
Fastest Lap: Marcos Ambrose (Stone Brothers Racing) - 1:23.1359 on lap 5
