= 2007 V8 Supercars Eastern Creek round =

2007 Supercar Championship event

(New South Wales) 2007 Eastern Creek round of the V8 Supercar Championship
Event Information
- Round 5 of 14 in the 2007 V8 Supercar Championship Series
- Date: 9–11 June 2007
- Location: Eastern Creek, New South Wales
- Venue: Eastern Creek Raceway
- Weather: Fine

Results
Race 1
Distance	31 laps	120 km
Pole position	Todd Kelly; Holden Racing Team	1:31.6332
Winner	Mark Skaife; Holden Racing Team	51:54.2697
Race 2
Distance	31 laps	120 km
Winner	Mark Skaife; Holden Racing Team	57:02.5256
Race 3
Distance	31 laps	120 km
Winner	Todd Kelly; Holden Racing Team	50:42.8679
Round Results
First	Mark Skaife; Holden Racing Team	65 pts
Second	Todd Kelly; Holden Racing Team	52 pts
Third	Rick Kelly; HSV Dealer Team	52 pts

The 2007 V8 Supercars Eastern Creek round was the fifth round of the 2007 V8 Supercar Championship Series. It took place between June 9 to 11 at Eastern Creek International Raceway in Sydney, New South Wales.

In a return to form after a turbulent start to the season, Mark Skaife took his 38th V8 Supercar round victory after winning the first two races of the weekend. The round victory allowed him to overtake Peter Brock for the most round victories in V8 Supercar history.

Rick Kelly continued his strong championship campaign to extend his lead in the drivers standings heading into the sixth round in Darwin.

== Background ==
=== Entry list ===
There were 30 drivers entered for this round with no alterations to the entry list from the previous round.

== Race report ==
=== Qualifying ===
Pos	No	Name	Team	Vehicle	Time
1	22	(Australia) Todd Kelly	Holden Racing Team	Holden Commodore (VE)	1:31.6332
2	2	(Australia) Mark Skaife	Holden Racing Team	Holden Commodore (VE)	1:31.6691
3	1	(Australia) Rick Kelly	HSV Dealer Team	Holden Commodore (VE)	1:31.8918
4	88	(Australia) Jamie Whincup	Triple Eight Race Engineering	Ford Falcon (BF)	1:32.1499
5	6	(New Zealand) Steven Richards	Ford Performance Racing	Ford Falcon (BF)	1:32.2726
6	16	(Australia) Garth Tander	HSV Dealer Team	Holden Commodore (VE)	1:32.2915
7	25	(Australia) Jason Bright	Britek Motorsport	Ford Falcon (BF)	1:32.3692
8	18	(Australia) Will Davison	Dick Johnson Racing	Ford Falcon (BF)	1:32.4373
9	4	(Australia) James Courtney	Stone Brothers Racing	Ford Falcon (BF)	1:32.4377
10	3	(New Zealand) Jason Richards	Tasman Motorsport	Holden Commodore (VE)	1:32.9672
11	5	(Australia) Mark Winterbottom	Ford Performance Racing	Ford Falcon (BF)	1:32.4987
12	10	(Australia) Jason Bargwanna	WPS Racing	Ford Falcon (BF)	1:32.5156
13	8	(Brazil) Max Wilson	WPS Racing	Ford Falcon (BF)	1:32.5528
14	9	(Australia) Russell Ingall	Stone Brothers Racing	Ford Falcon (BF)	1:32.6780
15	51	(New Zealand) Greg Murphy	Tasman Motorsport	Holden Commodore (VE)	1:32.7094
16	888	(Australia) Craig Lowndes	Triple Eight Race Engineering	Ford Falcon (BF)	1:32.7199
17	34	(Australia) Dean Canto	Garry Rogers Motorsport	Holden Commodore (VE)	1:32.7769
18	11	(Australia) Jack Perkins	Perkins Engineering	Holden Commodore (VE)	1:32.7809
19	50	(Australia) Cameron McConville	Paul Weel Racing	Holden Commodore (VZ)	1:32.8157
20	20	(Australia) Paul Dumbrell	Paul Weel Racing	Holden Commodore (VE)	1:32.9794
21	17	(Australia) Steven Johnson	Dick Johnson Racing	Ford Falcon (BF)	1:33.1895
22	55	(Australia) Steve Owen	Rod Nash Racing	Holden Commodore (VE)	1:33.2235
23	14	(New Zealand) Simon Wills	Brad Jones Racing	Ford Falcon (BF)	1:33.3323
24	33	(Australia) Lee Holdsworth	Garry Rogers Motorsport	Holden Commodore (VZ)	1:33.4030
25	67	(Australia) Paul Morris	Paul Morris Motorsport	Holden Commodore (VE)	1:33.4068
26	39	(New Zealand) Fabian Coulthard	Paul Morris Motorsport	Holden Commodore (VZ)	1:33.5980
27	7	(Australia) Shane Price	Perkins Engineering	Holden Commodore (VE)	1:33.6751
28	111	(Australia) John Bowe	Paul Cruickshank Racing	Ford Falcon (BF)	1:33.7271
29	12	(Australia) Andrew Jones	Brad Jones Racing	Ford Falcon (BF)	1:33.9425
30	26	(Australia) Alan Gurr	Britek Motorsport	Ford Falcon (BF)	1:35.2951

=== Race 1 ===
Pos	No	Driver	Team	Car	Laps	Time/Retired	Grid
1	2	(Australia) Mark Skaife	Holden Racing Team	Holden Commodore (VE)	31	51:54.2697	2
2	88	(Australia) Jamie Whincup	Triple Eight Race Engineering	Ford Falcon (BF)	31	+ 1.563	4
3	1	(Australia) Rick Kelly	HSV Dealer Team	Holden Commodore (VE)	31	+ 6.664	3
4	22	(Australia) Todd Kelly	Holden Racing Team	Holden Commodore (VE)	31	+ 7.627	1
5	16	(Australia) Garth Tander	HSV Dealer Team	Holden Commodore (VE)	31	+ 7.853	6
6	6	(New Zealand) Steven Richards	Ford Performance Racing	Ford Falcon (BF)	31	+ 9.367	5
7	9	(Australia) Russell Ingall	Stone Brothers Racing	Ford Falcon (BF)	31	+ 9.642	14
8	25	(Australia) Jason Bright	Britek Motorsport	Ford Falcon (BF)	31	+ 14.344	7
9	888	(Australia) Craig Lowndes	Triple Eight Race Engineering	Ford Falcon (BF)	31	+ 14.464	16
10	17	(Australia) Steven Johnson	Dick Johnson Racing	Ford Falcon (BF)	31	+ 14.725	21
11	5	(Australia) Mark Winterbottom	Ford Performance Racing	Ford Falcon (BF)	31	+ 15.225	11
12	51	(New Zealand) Greg Murphy	Tasman Motorsport	Holden Commodore (VE)	31	+ 15.675	15
13	3	(New Zealand) Jason Richards	Tasman Motorsport	Holden Commodore (VE)	31	+ 15.931	10
14	18	(Australia) Will Davison	Dick Johnson Racing	Ford Falcon (BF)	31	+ 16.277	8
15	10	(Australia) Jason Bargwanna	WPS Racing	Ford Falcon (BF)	31	+ 16.690	12
16	34	(Australia) Dean Canto	Garry Rogers Motorsport	Holden Commodore (VE)	31	+ 17.112	17
17	67	(Australia) Paul Morris	Paul Morris Motorsport	Holden Commodore (VE)	31	+ 17.511	25
18	50	(Australia) Cameron McConville	Paul Weel Racing	Holden Commodore (VZ)	31	+ 18.223	19
19	8	(Brazil) Max Wilson	WPS Racing	Ford Falcon (BF)	31	+ 18.674	13
20	11	(Australia) Jack Perkins	Perkins Engineering	Holden Commodore (VE)	31	+ 19.182	18
21	14	(New Zealand) Simon Wills	Brad Jones Racing	Ford Falcon (BF)	31	+ 20.074	23
22	111	(Australia) John Bowe	Paul Cruickshank Racing	Ford Falcon (BF)	31	+ 20.399	28
23	33	(Australia) Lee Holdsworth	Garry Rogers Motorsport	Holden Commodore (VZ)	31	+ 20.777	24
24	12	(Australia) Andrew Jones	Brad Jones Racing	Ford Falcon (BF)	31	+ 21.176	29
25	7	(Australia) Shane Price	Perkins Engineering	Holden Commodore (VE)	31	+ 22.773	27
26	26	(Australia) Alan Gurr	Britek Motorsport	Ford Falcon (BF)	31	+ 24.284	30
27	55	(Australia) Steve Owen	Rod Nash Racing	Holden Commodore (VZ)	31	+ 53.227	22
Ret	39	(New Zealand) Fabian Coulthard	Paul Morris Motorsport	Holden Commodore (VZ)	22	Retired	26
Ret	4	(Australia) James Courtney	Stone Brothers Racing	Holden Commodore (VE)	17	Retired	9
Ret	20	(Australia) Paul Dumbrell	Paul Weel Racing	Holden Commodore (VE)	14	Retired	20
Fastest Lap: Mark Skaife (Holden Racing Team) - 1:33.3802 on lap 2

=== Race 2 ===
Pos	No	Driver	Team	Car	Laps	Time/Retired	Grid
1	2	(Australia) Mark Skaife	Holden Racing Team	Holden Commodore (VE)	31	57:02.5256	1
2	1	(Australia) Rick Kelly	HSV Dealer Team	Holden Commodore (VE)	31	+ 1.815	3
3	88	(Australia) Jamie Whincup	Triple Eight Race Engineering	Ford Falcon (BF)	31	+ 2.015	2
4	888	(Australia) Craig Lowndes	Triple Eight Race Engineering	Ford Falcon (BF)	31	+ 3.406	9
5	22	(Australia) Todd Kelly	Holden Racing Team	Holden Commodore (VE)	31	+ 5.131	4
6	6	(New Zealand) Steven Richards	Ford Performance Racing	Ford Falcon (BF)	31	+ 5.587	6
7	5	(Australia) Mark Winterbottom	Ford Performance Racing	Ford Falcon (BF)	31	+ 6.458	11
8	17	(Australia) Steven Johnson	Dick Johnson Racing	Ford Falcon (BF)	31	+ 8.158	10
9	18	(Australia) Will Davison	Dick Johnson Racing	Ford Falcon (BF)	31	+ 8.754	14
10	67	(Australia) Paul Morris	Paul Morris Motorsport	Holden Commodore (VE)	31	+ 9.108	17
11	9	(Australia) Russell Ingall	Stone Brothers Racing	Ford Falcon (BF)	31	+ 10.030	7
12	33	(Australia) Lee Holdsworth	Garry Rogers Motorsport	Holden Commodore (VZ)	31	+ 10.341	23
13	10	(Australia) Jason Bargwanna	WPS Racing	Ford Falcon (BF)	31	+ 11.042	15
14	4	(Australia) James Courtney	Stone Brothers Racing	Holden Commodore (VE)	31	+ 11.365	29
15	16	(Australia) Garth Tander	HSV Dealer Team	Holden Commodore (VE)	31	+ 12.044	5
16	50	(Australia) Cameron McConville	Paul Weel Racing	Holden Commodore (VZ)	31	+ 15.660	18
17	39	(New Zealand) Fabian Coulthard	Paul Morris Motorsport	Holden Commodore (VZ)	31	+ 15.833	28
18	14	(New Zealand) Simon Wills	Brad Jones Racing	Ford Falcon (BF)	31	+ 17.854	21
19	20	(Australia) Paul Dumbrell	Paul Weel Racing	Holden Commodore (VE)	31	+ 18.222	30
20	11	(Australia) Jack Perkins	Perkins Engineering	Holden Commodore (VE)	31	+ 18.364	20
21	111	(Australia) John Bowe	Paul Cruickshank Racing	Ford Falcon (BF)	31	+ 19.018	22
22	25	(Australia) Jason Bright	Britek Motorsport	Ford Falcon (BF)	31	+ 38.145	8
23	8	(Brazil) Max Wilson	WPS Racing	Ford Falcon (BF)	31	+ 44.504	19
24	3	(New Zealand) Jason Richards	Tasman Motorsport	Holden Commodore (VE)	30	+ 1 lap	13
25	51	(New Zealand) Greg Murphy	Tasman Motorsport	Holden Commodore (VE)	27	+ 4 laps	12
Ret	34	(Australia) Dean Canto	Garry Rogers Motorsport	Holden Commodore (VE)	25	Retired	16
Ret	26	(Australia) Alan Gurr	Britek Motorsport	Ford Falcon (BF)	22	Retired	26
Ret	7	(Australia) Shane Price	Perkins Engineering	Holden Commodore (VE)	17	Retired	25
Ret	55	(Australia) Steve Owen	Rod Nash Racing	Holden Commodore (VZ)	7	Retired	27
Ret	12	(Australia) Andrew Jones	Brad Jones Racing	Ford Falcon (BF)	2	Retired	24
Fastest Lap: Mark Skaife (Holden Racing Team) - 1:33.8239 on lap 2

=== Race 3 ===
Pos	No	Driver	Team	Car	Laps	Time/Retired	Grid
1	22	(Australia) Todd Kelly	Holden Racing Team	Holden Commodore (VE)	31	50:42.8679	5
2	888	(Australia) Craig Lowndes	Triple Eight Race Engineering	Ford Falcon (BF)	31	+ 0.290	4
3	2	(Australia) Mark Skaife	Holden Racing Team	Holden Commodore (VE)	31	+ 0.634	1
4	1	(Australia) Rick Kelly	HSV Dealer Team	Holden Commodore (VE)	31	+ 4.611	2
5	16	(Australia) Garth Tander	HSV Dealer Team	Holden Commodore (VE)	31	+ 9.198	15
6	5	(Australia) Mark Winterbottom	Ford Performance Racing	Ford Falcon (BF)	31	+ 9.950	7
7	6	(New Zealand) Steven Richards	Ford Performance Racing	Ford Falcon (BF)	31	+ 15.647	6
8	4	(Australia) James Courtney	Stone Brothers Racing	Holden Commodore (VE)	31	+ 15.885	14
9	17	(Australia) Steven Johnson	Dick Johnson Racing	Ford Falcon (BF)	31	+ 26.077	8
10	18	(Australia) Will Davison	Dick Johnson Racing	Ford Falcon (BF)	31	+ 26.304	9
11	51	(New Zealand) Greg Murphy	Tasman Motorsport	Holden Commodore (VE)	31	+ 29.608	25
12	9	(Australia) Russell Ingall	Stone Brothers Racing	Ford Falcon (BF)	31	+ 32.317	11
13	10	(Australia) Jason Bargwanna	WPS Racing	Ford Falcon (BF)	31	+ 34.725	13
14	25	(Australia) Jason Bright	Britek Motorsport	Ford Falcon (BF)	31	+ 35.109	22
15	67	(Australia) Paul Morris	Paul Morris Motorsport	Holden Commodore (VE)	31	+ 35.900	10
16	3	(New Zealand) Jason Richards	Tasman Motorsport	Holden Commodore (VE)	31	+ 36.279	24
17	50	(Australia) Cameron McConville	Paul Weel Racing	Holden Commodore (VZ)	31	+ 38.799	16
18	20	(Australia) Paul Dumbrell	Paul Weel Racing	Holden Commodore (VE)	31	+ 43.208	19
19	14	(New Zealand) Simon Wills	Brad Jones Racing	Ford Falcon (BF)	31	+ 43.587	18
20	39	(New Zealand) Fabian Coulthard	Paul Morris Motorsport	Holden Commodore (VZ)	31	+ 44.446	17
21	8	(Brazil) Max Wilson	WPS Racing	Ford Falcon (BF)	31	+ 45.119	23
22	7	(Australia) Shane Price	Perkins Engineering	Holden Commodore (VE)	31	+ 59.145	27
23	12	(Australia) Andrew Jones	Brad Jones Racing	Ford Falcon (BF)	31	+ 1:03.736	29
24	111	(Australia) John Bowe	Paul Cruickshank Racing	Ford Falcon (BF)	31	+ 1:03.983	21
25	11	(Australia) Jack Perkins	Perkins Engineering	Holden Commodore (VE)	29	+ 2 laps	20
Ret	26	(Australia) Alan Gurr	Britek Motorsport	Ford Falcon (BF)	23	Retired	26
Ret	55	(Australia) Steve Owen	Rod Nash Racing	Holden Commodore (VZ)	2	Retired	28
Ret	33	(Australia) Lee Holdsworth	Garry Rogers Motorsport	Holden Commodore (VZ)	1	Retired	12
DSQ	88	(Australia) Jamie Whincup	Triple Eight Race Engineering	Ford Falcon (BF)	31	Disqualified	3
DNS	34	(Australia) Dean Canto	Garry Rogers Motorsport	Holden Commodore (VE)	25	Did not start	
Fastest Lap: Craig Lowndes (Triple Eight Race Engineering) - 1:33.6419 on lap 13
