= 2007 V8 Supercars Ipswich round =

2007 Supercar Championship event

(Queensland) 2007 V8 Supercars Ipswich round
Event Information
- Round 7 of 14 in the 2007 V8 Supercar Championship Series
- Date: 20–22 July 2007
- Location: Ipswich, Queensland
- Venue: Queensland Raceway
- Weather: Fine

Results
Race 1
Distance	38 laps	120 km
Pole position	Jamie Whincup; Triple Eight Race Engineering	1:10.1489
Winner	Garth Tander; HSV Dealer Team	46:12.5325
Race 2
Distance	38 laps	120 km
Winner	Garth Tander; HSV Dealer Team	48:39.2172
Race 3
Distance	38 laps	120 km
Winner	Garth Tander; HSV Dealer Team	50:01.0691
Round Results
First	Garth Tander; HSV Dealer Team	72 pts
Second	Jamie Whincup; Triple Eight Race Engineering	52 pts
Third	Craig Lowndes; Triple Eight Race Engineering	50 pts

The 2007 V8 Supercars Ipswich round was the seventh round of the 2007 V8 Supercar Championship Series. It took place on the weekend of 20 to 22 July at Queensland Raceway in Ipswich, Queensland.

Garth Tander dominated the round, winning all three races across the weekend en route to claiming overall round honours. This strong result allowed Tander to usurp teammate Rick Kelly as the new leader of the championship standings after Kelly himself endured a tough weekend.

== Background ==
=== Entry list ===
There were 30 drivers entered for this round. The only driver change for this round occurred with Steven Ellery replacing Fabian Coulthard at Paul Morris Motorsport.

== Race report ==
=== Qualifying ===
Pos	No	Name	Team	Vehicle	Time
1	88	(Australia) Jamie Whincup	Triple Eight Race Engineering	Ford Falcon (BF)	1:10.1489
2	2	(Australia) Mark Skaife	Holden Racing Team	Holden Commodore (VE)	1:10.2915
3	16	(Australia) Garth Tander	HSV Dealer Team	Holden Commodore (VE)	1:10.4165
4	4	(Australia) James Courtney	Stone Brothers Racing	Ford Falcon (BF)	1:10.4486
5	5	(Australia) Mark Winterbottom	Ford Performance Racing	Ford Falcon (BF)	1:10.4580
6	888	(Australia) Craig Lowndes	Triple Eight Race Engineering	Ford Falcon (BF)	1:10.4652
7	18	(Australia) Will Davison	Dick Johnson Racing	Ford Falcon (BF)	1:10.4958
8	1	(Australia) Rick Kelly	HSV Dealer Team	Holden Commodore (VE)	1:10.5198
9	9	(Australia) Russell Ingall	Stone Brothers Racing	Ford Falcon (BF)	1:10.5883
10	22	(Australia) Todd Kelly	Holden Racing Team	Holden Commodore (VE)	1:10.6825
11	34	(Australia) Dean Canto	Garry Rogers Motorsport	Holden Commodore (VE)	1:10.7628
12	6	(New Zealand) Steven Richards	Ford Performance Racing	Ford Falcon (BF)	1:10.8138
13	33	(Australia) Lee Holdsworth	Garry Rogers Motorsport	Holden Commodore (VE)	1:10.8498
14	55	(Australia) Steve Owen	Rod Nash Racing	Holden Commodore (VZ)	1:10.8822
15	17	(Australia) Steven Johnson	Dick Johnson Racing	Ford Falcon (BF)	1:10.9376
16	7	(Australia) Shane Price	Perkins Engineering	Holden Commodore (VE)	1:10.9744
17	8	(Brazil) Max Wilson	WPS Racing	Ford Falcon (BF)	1:11.0051
18	3	(New Zealand) Jason Richards	Tasman Motorsport	Holden Commodore (VE)	1:11.0271
19	10	(Australia) Jason Bargwanna	WPS Racing	Ford Falcon (BF)	1:11.0350
20	67	(Australia) Paul Morris	Paul Morris Motorsport	Holden Commodore (VE)	1:11.1711
21	12	(Australia) Andrew Jones	Brad Jones Racing	Ford Falcon (BF)	1:11.3037
22	11	(Australia) Jack Perkins	Perkins Engineering	Holden Commodore (VE)	1:11.3294
23	50	(Australia) Cameron McConville	Paul Weel Racing	Holden Commodore (VE)	1:11.3997
24	111	(Australia) John Bowe	Paul Cruickshank Racing	Ford Falcon (BF)	1:11.4219
25	25	(Australia) Jason Bright	Britek Motorsport	Ford Falcon (BF)	1:11.4910
26	51	(New Zealand) Greg Murphy	Tasman Motorsport	Holden Commodore (VE)	1:11.4935
27	39	(Australia) Steven Ellery	Paul Morris Motorsport	Holden Commodore (VZ)	1:11.4985
28	14	(New Zealand) Simon Wills	Brad Jones Racing	Ford Falcon (BF)	1:11.5476
29	20	(Australia) Paul Dumbrell	Paul Weel Racing	Holden Commodore (VE)	1:11.8775
30	26	(Australia) Alan Gurr	Britek Motorsport	Ford Falcon (BF)	1:12.0089

=== Race 1 ===
Pos	No	Driver	Team	Car	Laps	Time/Retired	Grid
1	16	(Australia) Garth Tander	HSV Dealer Team	Holden Commodore (VE)	38		
2	2	(Australia) Mark Skaife	Holden Racing Team	Holden Commodore (VE)	38		
3	4	(Australia) James Courtney	Stone Brothers Racing	Ford Falcon (BF)	38		
4	88	(Australia) Jamie Whincup	Triple Eight Race Engineering	Ford Falcon (BF)	38		
5	888	(Australia) Craig Lowndes	Triple Eight Race Engineering	Ford Falcon (BF)	38		
6	18	(Australia) Will Davison	Dick Johnson Racing	Ford Falcon (BF)	38		
7	1	(Australia) Rick Kelly	HSV Dealer Team	Holden Commodore (VE)	38		
8	22	(Australia) Todd Kelly	Holden Racing Team	Holden Commodore (VE)	38		
9	9	(Australia) Russell Ingall	Stone Brothers Racing	Ford Falcon (BF)	38		
10	5	(Australia) Mark Winterbottom	Ford Performance Racing	Ford Falcon (BF)	38		
11	17	(Australia) Steven Johnson	Dick Johnson Racing	Ford Falcon (BF)	38		
12	67	(Australia) Paul Morris	Paul Morris Motorsport	Holden Commodore (VE)	38		
13	6	(New Zealand) Steven Richards	Ford Performance Racing	Ford Falcon (BF)	38		
14	10	(Australia) Jason Bargwanna	WPS Racing	Ford Falcon (BF)	38		
15	8	(Brazil) Max Wilson	WPS Racing	Ford Falcon (BF)	38		
16	34	(Australia) Dean Canto	Garry Rogers Motorsport	Holden Commodore (VE)	38		
17	25	(Australia) Jason Bright	Britek Motorsport	Ford Falcon (BF)	38		
18	55	(Australia) Steve Owen	Rod Nash Racing	Holden Commodore (VZ)	38		
19	51	(New Zealand) Greg Murphy	Tasman Motorsport	Holden Commodore (VE)	38		
20	39	(Australia) Steven Ellery	Paul Morris Motorsport	Holden Commodore (VZ)	38		
21	14	(New Zealand) Simon Wills	Brad Jones Racing	Ford Falcon (BF)	38		
22	20	(Australia) Paul Weel	Paul Weel Racing	Holden Commodore (VE)	38		
23	111	(Australia) John Bowe	Paul Cruickshank Racing	Ford Falcon (BF)	38		
24	12	(Australia) Andrew Jones	Brad Jones Racing	Ford Falcon (BF)	37	+ 1 lap	
Ret	33	(Australia) Lee Holdsworth	Garry Rogers Motorsport	Holden Commodore (VE)	26	Retired	
Ret	3	(New Zealand) Jason Richards	Tasman Motorsport	Holden Commodore (VE)	9	Retired	
Ret	7	(Australia) Shane Price	Perkins Engineering	Holden Commodore (VE)	6	Retired	
Ret	26	(Australia) Alan Gurr	Britek Motorsport	Ford Falcon (BF)	5	Retired	
Ret	11	(Australia) Jack Perkins	Perkins Engineering	Holden Commodore (VE)	1	Retired	
Ret	50	(Australia) Cameron McConville	Paul Weel Racing	Holden Commodore (VE)	0	Retired	
Fastest Lap: Garth Tander (HSV Dealer Team) - 1:11.1314 on lap 9

=== Race 2 ===
Pos	No	Driver	Team	Car	Laps	Time/Retired	Grid
1	16	(Australia) Garth Tander	HSV Dealer Team	Holden Commodore (VE)	38		
2	88	(Australia) Jamie Whincup	Triple Eight Race Engineering	Ford Falcon (BF)	38		
3	888	(Australia) Craig Lowndes	Triple Eight Race Engineering	Ford Falcon (BF)	38		
4	4	(Australia) James Courtney	Stone Brothers Racing	Ford Falcon (BF)	38		
5	18	(Australia) Will Davison	Dick Johnson Racing	Ford Falcon (BF)	38		
6	9	(Australia) Russell Ingall	Stone Brothers Racing	Ford Falcon (BF)	38		
7	5	(Australia) Mark Winterbottom	Ford Performance Racing	Ford Falcon (BF)	38		
8	2	(Australia) Mark Skaife	Holden Racing Team	Holden Commodore (VE)	38		
9	67	(Australia) Paul Morris	Paul Morris Motorsport	Holden Commodore (VE)	38		
10	33	(Australia) Lee Holdsworth	Garry Rogers Motorsport	Holden Commodore (VE)	38		
11	22	(Australia) Todd Kelly	Holden Racing Team	Holden Commodore (VE)	38		
12	51	(New Zealand) Greg Murphy	Tasman Motorsport	Holden Commodore (VE)	38		
13	3	(New Zealand) Jason Richards	Tasman Motorsport	Holden Commodore (VE)	38		
14	8	(Brazil) Max Wilson	WPS Racing	Ford Falcon (BF)	38		
15	34	(Australia) Dean Canto	Garry Rogers Motorsport	Holden Commodore (VE)	38		
16	1	(Australia) Rick Kelly	HSV Dealer Team	Holden Commodore (VE)	38		
17	111	(Australia) John Bowe	Paul Cruickshank Racing	Ford Falcon (BF)	38		
18	50	(Australia) Cameron McConville	Paul Weel Racing	Holden Commodore (VE)	38		
19	11	(Australia) Jack Perkins	Perkins Engineering	Holden Commodore (VE)	38		
20	26	(Australia) Alan Gurr	Britek Motorsport	Ford Falcon (BF)	38		
21	14	(New Zealand) Simon Wills	Brad Jones Racing	Ford Falcon (BF)	38		
22	17	(Australia) Steven Johnson	Dick Johnson Racing	Ford Falcon (BF)	38		
23	12	(Australia) Andrew Jones	Brad Jones Racing	Ford Falcon (BF)	38		
24	7	(Australia) Shane Price	Perkins Engineering	Holden Commodore (VE)	38		
25	39	(Australia) Steven Ellery	Paul Morris Motorsport	Holden Commodore (VZ)	38		
Ret	20	(Australia) Paul Weel	Paul Weel Racing	Holden Commodore (VE)	36	Retired	
Ret	10	(Australia) Jason Bargwanna	WPS Racing	Ford Falcon (BF)	16	Retired	
Ret	25	(Australia) Jason Bright	Britek Motorsport	Ford Falcon (BF)	11	Retired	
Ret	55	(Australia) Steve Owen	Rod Nash Racing	Holden Commodore (VZ)	5	Retired	
Ret	6	(New Zealand) Steven Richards	Ford Performance Racing	Ford Falcon (BF)	4	Retired	
Fastest Lap: Garth Tander (HSV Dealer Team) - 1:11.2398 on lap 10

=== Race 3 ===
Pos	No	Driver	Team	Car	Laps	Time/Retired	Grid
1	16	(Australia) Garth Tander	HSV Dealer Team	Holden Commodore (VE)	38	50:01.0691	
2	888	(Australia) Craig Lowndes	Triple Eight Race Engineering	Ford Falcon (BF)	38		
3	88	(Australia) Jamie Whincup	Triple Eight Race Engineering	Ford Falcon (BF)	38		
4	18	(Australia) Will Davison	Dick Johnson Racing	Ford Falcon (BF)	38		
5	5	(Australia) Mark Winterbottom	Ford Performance Racing	Ford Falcon (BF)	38		
6	1	(Australia) Rick Kelly	HSV Dealer Team	Holden Commodore (VE)	38		
7	51	(New Zealand) Greg Murphy	Tasman Motorsport	Holden Commodore (VE)	38		
8	3	(New Zealand) Jason Richards	Tasman Motorsport	Holden Commodore (VE)	38		
9	9	(Australia) Russell Ingall	Stone Brothers Racing	Ford Falcon (BF)	38		
10	33	(Australia) Lee Holdsworth	Garry Rogers Motorsport	Holden Commodore (VE)	38		
11	11	(Australia) Jack Perkins	Perkins Engineering	Holden Commodore (VE)	38		
12	111	(Australia) John Bowe	Paul Cruickshank Racing	Ford Falcon (BF)	38		
13	34	(Australia) Dean Canto	Garry Rogers Motorsport	Holden Commodore (VE)	38		
14	50	(Australia) Cameron McConville	Paul Weel Racing	Holden Commodore (VE)	38		
15	67	(Australia) Paul Morris	Paul Morris Motorsport	Holden Commodore (VE)	38		
16	7	(Australia) Shane Price	Perkins Engineering	Holden Commodore (VE)	38		
17	2	(Australia) Mark Skaife	Holden Racing Team	Holden Commodore (VE)	38		
18	4	(Australia) James Courtney	Stone Brothers Racing	Ford Falcon (BF)	38		
19	22	(Australia) Todd Kelly	Holden Racing Team	Holden Commodore (VE)	38		
20	26	(Australia) Alan Gurr	Britek Motorsport	Ford Falcon (BF)	37	+ 1 lap	
21	10	(Australia) Jason Bargwanna	WPS Racing	Ford Falcon (BF)	37	+ 1 lap	
Ret	6	(New Zealand) Steven Richards	Ford Performance Racing	Ford Falcon (BF)	33	Retired	
Ret	25	(Australia) Jason Bright	Britek Motorsport	Ford Falcon (BF)	29	Retired	
Ret	39	(Australia) Steven Ellery	Paul Morris Motorsport	Holden Commodore (VZ)	28	Retired	
Ret	8	(Brazil) Max Wilson	WPS Racing	Ford Falcon (BF)	24	Retired	
Ret	20	(Australia) Paul Weel	Paul Weel Racing	Holden Commodore (VE)	19	Retired	
Ret	55	(Australia) Steve Owen	Rod Nash Racing	Holden Commodore (VZ)	17	Retired	
Ret	14	(New Zealand) Simon Wills	Brad Jones Racing	Ford Falcon (BF)	12	Retired	
Ret	12	(Australia) Andrew Jones	Brad Jones Racing	Ford Falcon (BF)	11	Retired	
Ret	17	(Australia) Steven Johnson	Dick Johnson Racing	Ford Falcon (BF)	9	Retired	
Fastest Lap: Jason Bright (Britek Motorsport) - 1:11.3791 on lap 26
