= 2007 Oran Park 400 =

2007 Supercar Championship event

(New South Wales) 2007 Jim Beam 400
Event Information
- Round 8 of 14 in the 2007 V8 Supercar Championship Series
- Date: 17–19 August 2007
- Location: Sydney, New South Wales
- Venue: Oran Park Raceway
- Weather: Rain

Results
Race 1
Distance	46 laps	120 km
Pole position	Todd Kelly; Holden Racing Team	1:08.4388
Winner	Mark Skaife; Holden Racing Team	56:37.0949
Race 2
Distance	46 laps	120 km
Winner	Craig Lowndes; Triple Eight Race Engineering	1:03:25.7192
Race 3
Distance	25 laps	65 km
Winner	Lee Holdsworth; Garry Rogers Motorsport	37:59.1720
Round Results
First	Lee Holdsworth; Garry Rogers Motorsport	47 pts
Second	Steven Richards; Ford Performance Racing	38 pts
Third	Craig Lowndes; Triple Eight Race Engineering	38 pts

The 2007 Oran Park 400 (commercially titled 2007 Jim Beam 400) was the eighth round of the 2007 V8 Supercar Championship Series. It was held on the weekend of the 17 to 19 August at Oran Park Raceway in New South Wales.

The round was significant for the début of 3-time V8 Supercars champion and 3-time Bathurst 1000 winner Shane van Gisbergen with Team Kiwi Racing, as well as the first race and round win for Lee Holdsworth of Garry Rogers Motorsport.

== Results ==
=== Qualifying ===
Pos	No	Name	Team	Car	Qualifying times		
Pos	No	Name	Team	Car	Q1	Q2	Q3
1	22	(Australia) Todd Kelly	Holden Racing Team	Holden Commodore VE	1:09.117	1:08.875	1:08.439
2	16	(Australia) Garth Tander	HSV Dealer Team	Holden Commodore VE	1:08.966	1:08.633	1:08.529
3	2	(Australia) Mark Skaife	Holden Racing Team	Holden Commodore VE	1:08.753	1:08.725	1:08.544
4	33	(Australia) Lee Holdsworth	Garry Rogers Motorsport	Holden Commodore VE	1:09.134	1:08.917	1:08.606
5	1	(Australia) Rick Kelly	HSV Dealer Team	Holden Commodore VE	1:08.557	1:08.834	1:08.640
6	5	(Australia) Mark Winterbottom	Ford Performance Racing	Ford Falcon BF	1:09.127	1:08.771	1:08.693
7	3	(New Zealand) Jason Richards	Tasman Motorsport	Holden Commodore VE	1:09.143	1:08.657	1:08.699
8	6	(New Zealand) Steven Richards	Ford Performance Racing	Ford Falcon BF	1:09.042	1:09.013	1:08.754
9	88	(Australia) Jamie Whincup	Triple Eight Race Engineering	Ford Falcon BF	1:08.871	1:08.841	1:08.925
10	25	(Australia) Jason Bright	Britek Motorsport	Ford Falcon BF	1:09.258	1:09.006	1:10.309
11	18	(Australia) Will Davison	Dick Johnson Racing	Ford Falcon BF	1:09.367	1:09.015	N/A
12	67	(Australia) Paul Morris	Paul Morris Motorsport	Holden Commodore VE	1:09.369	1:09.019	N/A
13	34	(Australia) Dean Canto	Garry Rogers Motorsport	Holden Commodore VE	1:09.361	1:09.035	N/A
14	9	(Australia) Russell Ingall	Stone Brothers Racing	Ford Falcon BF	1:09.202	1:09.125	N/A
15	55	(Australia) Steve Owen	Rod Nash Racing	Holden Commodore VZ	1:09.280	1:09.397	N/A
16	51	(New Zealand) Greg Murphy	Tasman Motorsport	Holden Commodore VE	1:09.529	1:09.502	N/A
17	17	(Australia) Steven Johnson	Dick Johnson Racing	Ford Falcon BF	1:09.337	1:09.511	N/A
18	20	(Australia) Paul Dumbrell	Paul Weel Racing	Holden Commodore VE	1:09.379	1:09.559	N/A
19	8	(Brazil) Max Wilson	WPS Racing	Ford Falcon BF	1:09.532	1:09.947	N/A
20	50	(Australia) Cameron McConville	Paul Weel Racing	Holden Commodore VE	1:09.521	no time	N/A
21	10	(Australia) Jason Bargwanna	WPS Racing	Ford Falcon BF	1:09.538	N/A	N/A
22	4	(Australia) James Courtney	Stone Brothers Racing	Ford Falcon BF	1:09.553	N/A	N/A
23	888	(Australia) Craig Lowndes	Triple Eight Race Engineering	Ford Falcon BF	1:09.554	N/A	N/A
24	11	(Australia) Jack Perkins	Perkins Engineering	Holden Commodore VE	1:09.633	N/A	N/A
25	7	(Australia) Shane Price	Perkins Engineering	Holden Commodore VE	1:09.711	N/A	N/A
26	39	(New Zealand) Fabian Coulthard	Paul Morris Motorsport	Holden Commodore VZ	1:09.719	N/A	N/A
27	14	(New Zealand) Simon Wills	Brad Jones Racing	Ford Falcon BF	1:09.724	N/A	N/A
28	12	(Australia) Andrew Jones	Brad Jones Racing	Ford Falcon BF	1:09.759	N/A	N/A
29	021	(New Zealand) Shane van Gisbergen	Team Kiwi Racing	Ford Falcon BF	1:10.046	N/A	N/A
30	111	(Australia) John Bowe	Paul Cruickshank Racing	Ford Falcon BF	1:10.121	N/A	N/A
31	26	(Australia) Alan Gurr	Britek Motorsport	Ford Falcon BF	1:10.404	N/A	N/A

=== Race 1 results ===
Pos	No	Name	Team	Laps	Time/Retired	Grid	Points
1	2	(Australia) Mark Skaife	Holden Racing Team	46	56:37.095	3	24
2	1	(Australia) Rick Kelly	HSV Dealer Team	46	+0.648s	5	20
3	88	(Australia) Jamie Whincup	Triple Eight Race Engineering	46	+1.039s	9	17
4	5	(Australia) Mark Winterbottom	Ford Performance Racing	46	+10.332s	6	15
5	6	(New Zealand) Steven Richards	Ford Performance Racing	46	+11.018s	8	13
6	18	(Australia) Will Davison	Dick Johnson Racing	46	+18.219s	11	12
7	888	(Australia) Craig Lowndes	Triple Eight Race Engineering	46	+19.230s	23	11
8	22	(Australia) Todd Kelly	Holden Racing Team	46	+26.079s	1	10
9	51	(New Zealand) Greg Murphy	Tasman Motorsport	46	+28.570s	16	9
10	33	(Australia) Lee Holdsworth	Garry Rogers Motorsport	46	+29.045s	4	8
11	3	(New Zealand) Jason Richards	Tasman Motorsport	46	+30.133s	7	6
12	25	(Australia) Jason Bright	Britek Motorsport	46	+31.466s	10	5
13	17	(Australia) Steven Johnson	Dick Johnson Racing	46	+36.750s	17	4
14	39	(New Zealand) Fabian Coulthard	Paul Morris Motorsport	46	+39.776s	26	3
15	10	(Australia) Jason Bargwanna	WPS Racing	46	+40.126s	21	2
16	8	(Brazil) Max Wilson	WPS Racing	46	+41.328s	19	0
17	50	(Australia) Cameron McConville	Paul Weel Racing	46	+41.984s	20	0
18	34	(Australia) Dean Canto	Garry Rogers Motorsport	46	+42.570s	13	0
19	4	(Australia) James Courtney	Stone Brothers Racing	46	+49.237s	22	0
20	021	(New Zealand) Shane van Gisbergen	Team Kiwi Racing	46	+53.420s	29	0
21	11	(Australia) Jack Perkins	Perkins Engineering	46	+59.312s	24	0
22	26	(Australia) Alan Gurr	Britek Motorsport	46	+1:04.656s	31	0
23	111	(Australia) John Bowe	Paul Cruickshank Racing	45	+1 lap	30	0
24	14	(New Zealand) Simon Wills	Brad Jones Racing	45	+1 lap	27	0
25	20	(Australia) Paul Dumbrell	Paul Weel Racing	41	+4 laps	18	0
DNF	12	(Australia) Andrew Jones	Brad Jones Racing	13		28	0
DNF	16	(Australia) Garth Tander	HSV Dealer Team	3		2	0
DNF	7	(Australia) Shane Price	Perkins Engineering	2		25	0
DNF	55	(Australia) Steve Owen	Rod Nash Racing	2		PL	0
DNF	67	(Australia) Paul Morris	Paul Morris Motorsport	1		12	0
DNF	9	(Australia) Russell Ingall	Stone Brothers Racing	1		14	0

=== Race 2 results ===
Pos	No	Name	Team	Laps	Time/Retired	Grid	Points
1	888	(Australia) Craig Lowndes	Triple Eight Race Engineering	46	1:03:25.719	7	24
2	22	(Australia) Todd Kelly	Holden Racing Team	46	+2.991s	8	20
3	5	(Australia) Mark Winterbottom	Ford Performance Racing	46	+3.952s	4	17
4	33	(Australia) Lee Holdsworth	Garry Rogers Motorsport	46	+4.413s	10	15
5	3	(New Zealand) Jason Richards	Tasman Motorsport	46	+21.347s	11	13
6	6	(New Zealand) Steven Richards	Ford Performance Racing	46	+25.245s	5	12
7	4	(Australia) James Courtney	Stone Brothers Racing	46	+26.858s	19	11
8	18	(Australia) Will Davison	Dick Johnson Racing	46	+24.279s	6	10
9	9	(Australia) Russell Ingall	Stone Brothers Racing	46	+40.435s	31	9
10	14	(New Zealand) Simon Wills	Brad Jones Racing	46	+45.405s	24	8
11	8	(Brazil) Max Wilson	WPS Racing	46	+46.550s	16	6
12	17	(Australia) Steven Johnson	Dick Johnson Racing	46	+50.593s	13	5
13	021	(New Zealand) Shane van Gisbergen	Team Kiwi Racing	46	+55.682s	20	4
14	39	(New Zealand) Fabian Coulthard	Paul Morris Motorsport	46	+1:01.651s	14	3
15	1	(Australia) Rick Kelly	HSV Dealer Team	46	+1:02.223s	2	2
16	25	(Australia) Jason Bright	Britek Motorsport	46	+1:06.507s	12	0
17	12	(Australia) Andrew Jones	Brad Jones Racing	46	+1:06.881s	26	0
18	7	(Australia) Shane Price	Perkins Engineering	46	+1:06.977s	28	0
19	16	(Australia) Garth Tander	HSV Dealer Team	46	+1:07.658s	27	0
20	2	(Australia) Mark Skaife	Holden Racing Team	46	+1:08.184s	1	0
21	55	(Australia) Steve Owen	Rod Nash Racing	46	+1:12.046s	29	0
22	50	(Australia) Cameron McConville	Paul Weel Racing	45	+1 lap	17	0
23	34	(Australia) Dean Canto	Garry Rogers Motorsport	45	+1 lap	18	0
24	111	(Australia) John Bowe	Paul Cruickshank Racing	45	+1 lap	23	0
25	20	(Australia) Paul Dumbrell	Paul Weel Racing	45	+1 lap	25	0
26	11	(Australia) Jack Perkins	Perkins Engineering	45	+1 lap	21	0
27	10	(Australia) Jason Bargwanna	WPS Racing	45	+1 lap	15	0
28	26	(Australia) Alan Gurr	Britek Motorsport	44	+2 laps	22	0
DNF	67	(Australia) Paul Morris	Paul Morris Motorsport	28		30	0
DNF	88	(Australia) Jamie Whincup	Triple Eight Race Engineering	21		3	0
DNF	51	(New Zealand) Greg Murphy	Tasman Motorsport	13		9	0

=== Race 3 results ===
Pos	No	Name	Team	Laps	Time/Retired	Grid	Points
1	33	(Australia) Lee Holdsworth	Garry Rogers Motorsport	46	1:11:03.351	4	24
2	16	(Australia) Garth Tander	HSV Dealer Team	46	+6.341s	19	20
3	9	(Australia) Russell Ingall	Stone Brothers Racing	46	+8.230s	9	17
4	88	(Australia) Jamie Whincup	Triple Eight Race Engineering	46	+8.459s	30	15
5	6	(New Zealand) Steven Richards	Ford Performance Racing	46	+8.964s	6	13
6	3	(New Zealand) Jason Richards	Tasman Motorsport	46	+14.111s	5	12
7	12	(Australia) Andrew Jones	Brad Jones Racing	46	+15.008s	17	11
8	55	(Australia) Steve Owen	Rod Nash Racing	46	+16.230s	21	10
9	8	(Brazil) Max Wilson	WPS Racing	46	+16.469s	11	9
10	20	(Australia) Paul Dumbrell	Paul Weel Racing	46	+19.836s	25	8
11	22	(Australia) Todd Kelly	Holden Racing Team	46	+23.633s	2	6
12	17	(Australia) Steven Johnson	Dick Johnson Racing	46	+24.258s	12	5
13	10	(Australia) Jason Bargwanna	WPS Racing	45	+1 lap	27	4
14	888	(Australia) Craig Lowndes	Triple Eight Race Engineering	45	+1 lap	1	3
15	1	(Australia) Rick Kelly	HSV Dealer Team	45	+1 lap	15	2
16	18	(Australia) Will Davison	Dick Johnson Racing	45	+1 lap	8	0
17	14	(New Zealand) Simon Wills	Brad Jones Racing	45	+1 lap	10	0
18	11	(Australia) Jack Perkins	Perkins Engineering	45	+1 lap	26	0
19	111	(Australia) John Bowe	Paul Cruickshank Racing	45	+1 lap	24	0
20	7	(Australia) Shane Price	Perkins Engineering	45	+1 lap	18	0
21	67	(Australia) Paul Morris	Paul Morris Motorsport	45	+1 lap	29	0
22	51	(New Zealand) Greg Murphy	Tasman Motorsport	45	+1 lap	31	0
23	021	(New Zealand) Shane van Gisbergen	Team Kiwi Racing	45	+1 lap	13	0
24	5	(Australia) Mark Winterbottom	Ford Performance Racing	43	+3 laps	3	0
DNF	50	(Australia) Cameron McConville	Paul Weel Racing	43		22	0
DNF	39	(New Zealand) Fabian Coulthard	Paul Morris Motorsport	34		14	0
DNF	2	(Australia) Mark Skaife	Holden Racing Team	31		20	0
DNF	26	(Australia) Alan Gurr	Britek Motorsport	29		28	0
DNF	34	(Australia) Dean Canto	Garry Rogers Motorsport	27		23	0
DNF	25	(Australia) Jason Bright	Britek Motosport	22		16	0
DNF	4	(Australia) James Courtney	Stone Brothers Racing	17		7	0
