= 2006 Betta Electrical 500 =

2006 Supercar Championship event

(Victoria (state)) 2006 Betta Electrical 500
Event Information
- Round 8 of 13 in the 2006 V8 Supercar Championship Series
- Date: 1–3 September 2006
- Location: Melbourne, Victoria
- Venue: Sandown International Raceway
- Weather: Fine

Results
Race 1
| Distance | 161 laps | 500 km |
| Pole position | Garth Tander; Holden Racing Team | 1:10.6102 |
| Winner | Jason Bright; Mark Winterbottom; Ford Performance Racing | 3:22:16.2954 |
Round Results
| First | Jason Bright Mark Winterbottom; Ford Performance Racing | 320 pts |
| Second | Rick Kelly Todd Kelly; HSV Dealer Team | 310 pts |
| Third | Craig Lowndes Jamie Whincup; Triple Eight Race Engineering | 300 pts |

The 2006 Betta Electrical 500 was an endurance motor race for V8 Supercars. The race was held on 3 September 2006 at Sandown International Raceway in Victoria, Australia, and was the eighth round of the 2006 V8 Supercar Championship Series. It was the 39th in a sequence of "Sandown long distances races" which are commonly referred to under the Sandown 500 name.

The race was won by Jason Bright and Mark Winterbottom driving a Ford BA Falcon for Ford Performance Racing.

== Top ten shootout ==
Results as follows:

| Pos | No | Team | Driver | Car | Time |
|---|---|---|---|---|---|
| Pole | 2 | Holden Racing Team | (Australia) Garth Tander | Holden VZ Commodore | 1:10.6102 |
| 2 | 888 | Team Betta Electrical | (Australia) Craig Lowndes | Ford BA Falcon | 1:11.3471 |
| 3 | 6 | Ford Performance Racing | (Australia) Jason Bright | Ford BA Falcon | 1:11.4215 |
| 4 | 8 | WPS Racing | (Brazil) Max Wilson | Ford BA Falcon | 1:11.4708 |
| 5 | 10 | WPS Racing | (Australia) Jason Bargwanna | Ford BA Falcon | 1:11.6196 |
| 6 | 4 | Stone Brothers Racing | (Australia) James Courtney | Ford BA Falcon | 1:11.7777 |
| 7 | 22 | Holden Racing Team | (Australia) Ryan Briscoe | Holden VZ Commodore | 1:11.7804 |
| 8 | 3 | Tasman Motorsport | (New Zealand) Jason Richards | Holden VZ Commodore | 1:11.8630 |
| 9 | 17 | Dick Johnson Racing | (Australia) Steven Johnson | Ford BA Falcon | 1:11.8683 |
| 10 | 55 | Rod Nash Racing | (Australia) Steve Owen | Holden VZ Commodore | 1:12.3719 |

== Official results ==
Results as follows:

| Pos | No | Team | Drivers | Car | Laps | Qual Pos | Shootout Pos | Series Points |
|---|---|---|---|---|---|---|---|---|
| 1 | 6 | Ford Performance Racing | (Australia) Jason Bright (Australia) Mark Winterbottom | Ford BA Falcon | 161 | 3 | 3 | 320 |
| 2 | 15 | Toll HSV Dealer Team | (Australia) Rick Kelly (Australia) Todd Kelly | Holden VZ Commodore | 161 | 12 | | 310 |
| 3 | 888 | Team Betta Electrical | (Australia) Craig Lowndes (Australia) Jamie Whincup | Ford BA Falcon | 161 | 5 | 2 | 300 |
| 4 | 17 | Dick Johnson Racing | (Australia) Steven Johnson (Australia) Will Davison | Ford BA Falcon | 161 | 8 | 9 | 290 |
| 5 | 14 | Team BOC | (Australia) John Bowe (Australia) Brad Jones | Ford BA Falcon | 161 | 23 | | 280 |
| 6 | 34 | Garry Rogers Motorsport | (Australia) Dean Canto (Australia) Lee Holdsworth | Holden VZ Commodore | 161 | 11 | | 270 |
| 7 | 10 | WPS Racing | (Australia) Jason Bargwanna (New Zealand) Craig Baird | Ford BA Falcon | 160 | 10 | 5 | 260 |
| 8 | 67 | Team Sirromet Wines | (Australia) Paul Morris (Australia) Steve Ellery | Holden VZ Commodore | 160 | DSQ | | 250 |
| 9 | 4 | Stone Brothers Racing | (Australia) James Courtney (Australia) Glenn Seton | Ford BA Falcon | 160 | 9 | 6 | 240 |
| 10 | 50 | Supercheap Auto Racing | (Australia) Nathan Pretty (Australia) Paul Weel | Holden VZ Commodore | 160 | 28 | | 230 |
| 11 | 8 | WPS Racing | (Brazil) Max Wilson (Australia) David Besnard | Ford BA Falcon | 160 | 6 | 4 | 220 |
| 12 | 55 | Autobarn Racing | (Australia) Steve Owen (Australia) Tony Longhurst | Holden VZ Commodore | 159 | 7 | 10 | 210 |
| 13 | 021 | Team Kiwi Racing | (New Zealand) Paul Radisich (New Zealand) Fabian Coulthard | Holden VZ Commodore | 159 | 26 | | 200 |
| 14 | 18 | Dick Johnson Racing | (Australia) Alex Davison (Australia) Grant Denyer | Ford BA Falcon | 159 | 13 | | 190 |
| 15 | 5 | Ford Performance Racing | (New Zealand) Matt Halliday (Australia) Cameron McLean | Ford BA Falcon | 159 | 14 | | 180 |
| 16 | 16 | Toll HSV Dealer Team | (Australia) Anthony Tratt (Australia) Tony D'Alberto | Holden VZ Commodore | 159 | 18 | | 170 |
| 17 | 88 | Team Betta Electrical | (United Kingdom) Richard Lyons (Denmark) Allan Simonsen | Ford BA Falcon | 159 | 17 | | 160 |
| 18 | 12 | Team BOC | (Australia) Dale Brede (New Zealand) Mark Porter | Ford BA Falcon | 158 | 25 | | 150 |
| 19 | 39 | Team Sirromet Wines | (Australia) Alan Gurr (New Zealand) Kayne Scott | Holden VZ Commodore | 158 | 29 | | 140 |
| 20 | 33 | Garry Rogers Motorsport | (Australia) Greg Ritter (Australia) Phillip Scifleet | Holden VZ Commodore | 157 | 19 | | 130 |
| 21 | 22 | Holden Racing Team | (New Zealand) Jim Richards (Australia) Ryan Briscoe | Holden VZ Commodore | 157 | 1 | 7 | 120 |
| 22 | 26 | Fujitsu Racing | (Australia) José Fernández (Australia) Tony Ricciardello | Ford BA Falcon | 156 | 30 | | 110 |
| 23 | 25 | Fujitsu Racing | (Australia) Warren Luff (Australia) Adam Macrow | Ford BA Falcon | 155 | 22 | | 100 |
| 24 | 11 | Jack Daniel's Racing | (Australia) Jack Perkins (Australia) Shane Price | Holden VZ Commodore | 154 | 20 | | 90 |
| 25 | 20 | Paul Cruickshank Racing | (Australia) Marcus Marshall (Australia) Jonathon Webb | Ford BA Falcon | 153 | 27 | | 80 |
| 26 | 2 | Holden Racing Team | (Australia) Mark Skaife (Australia) Garth Tander | Holden VZ Commodore | 149 | 2 | 1 | 70 |
| 27 | 1 | Stone Brothers Racing | (Australia) Russell Ingall (Australia) Luke Youlden | Ford BA Falcon | 141 | 15 | | 60 |
| 28 | 7 | Jack Daniel's Racing | (New Zealand) Steven Richards (Australia) Paul Dumbrell | Holden VZ Commodore | 139 | 16 | | 50 |
| 29 | 51 | Supercheap Auto Racing | (New Zealand) Greg Murphy (Australia) Cameron McConville | Holden VZ Commodore | 139 | 24 | | 40 |
| 30 | 3 | Tasman Motorsport | (New Zealand) Jason Richards (Australia) Andrew Jones | Holden VZ Commodore | 133 | 4 | 8 | 30 |
| DNF | 23 | Tasman Motorsport | (Australia) Owen Kelly (Australia) Mark Noske | Holden VZ Commodore | 75 | 21 | | |

== Statistics ==
- Provisional pole position - #22 Ryan Briscoe - 1:10.8590
- Pole position - #2 Garth Tander - 1:10.6102
- Fastest lap - #2 Garth Tander - 1:11.7104
- Average race speed - 148 km/h
