= HSV Dealer Team =

Australian car racing team

- Team Principal: John Kelly; Margaret Kelly
- Debut: 2001
- Final Season: 2008
- Round wins: 16
- Pole positions: 11
- 2008 position: 6th (3,744 points)

The HSV Dealer Team, previously known as Tom Walkinshaw Racing Australia and John Kelly Racing, was an Australian V8 Supercar team. The team ceased operations at the end of 2008, with Walkinshaw Racing and Kelly Racing being formed by owners and staff of the former team. The team is best known for winning the Bathurst 1000 in 2003 and 2004 and the V8 Supercars Drivers & Teams Championships in 2006 and 2007.

== History ==
=== Tom Walkinshaw Racing Australia ===
The team was formed in 2001 (commercially known as K-Mart Racing Team) when Tom Walkinshaw Racing expanded its Holden Racing Team operation to four cars. Because a team could only race three cars under a Racing Entitlement Contract (REC) at the time, Romano Racing's REC was leased for the two K-Mart cars with the Romano car entered as a third Holden Racing Team car under the Holden Young Lions banner.

Todd Kelly who had driven a third HRT entry under the Holden Young Lions banner in 2000 drove one car, with the second driven by Greg Murphy who moved with the K-Mart sponsorship from Gibson Motorsport. The team achieved its first success in winning the final two rounds of the 2001 season. Murphy won his home event, the V8 International at Pukekohe Park Raceway, which was followed by Kelly winning the V8 Ultimate at Sandown Raceway, his first championship round win. Murphy would go on to win the Pukekohe event again for the team in 2002 and 2003.

=== John Kelly Racing ===
For 2003 the cars were entered under a REC leased from John Faulkner Racing with Rick Kelly replacing brother Todd. Following the February 2003 collapse of Tom Walkinshaw Racing, the team was purchased by Holden before being quickly on-sold to John and Margaret Kelly, the parents of Rick and Todd, as manufacturers were barred from owning teams. In July 2003 the leased John Faulkner REC was returned (and subsequently sold to Paul Weel Racing), after one was purchased from 00 Motorsport.

==== Bathurst success ====
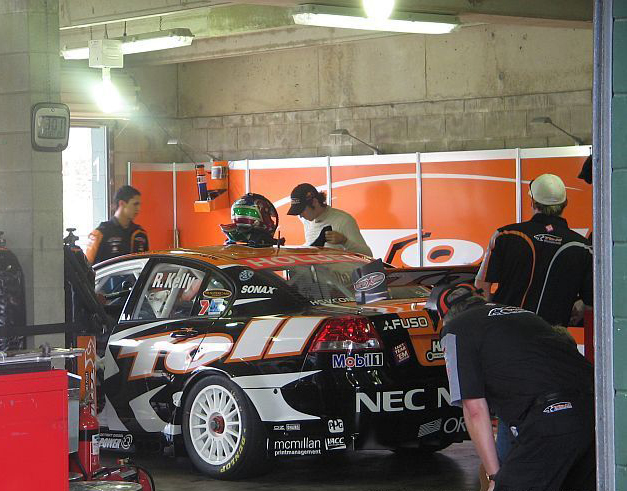
Rick Kelly at Hidden Valley Raceway in June 2007

The team won both the 2003 and 2004 Bathurst 1000 with Murphy and Rick Kelly as co-drivers. This included being a part of one of the most famous moments in Bathurst history in 2003, with Murphy setting what became known as the 'Lap of the Gods' in the Top 10 Shootout. The lap was the fastest in circuit history at the time. In winning the 2003 race, Rick Kelly became the youngest winner in the race's history.

=== HSV Dealer Team ===
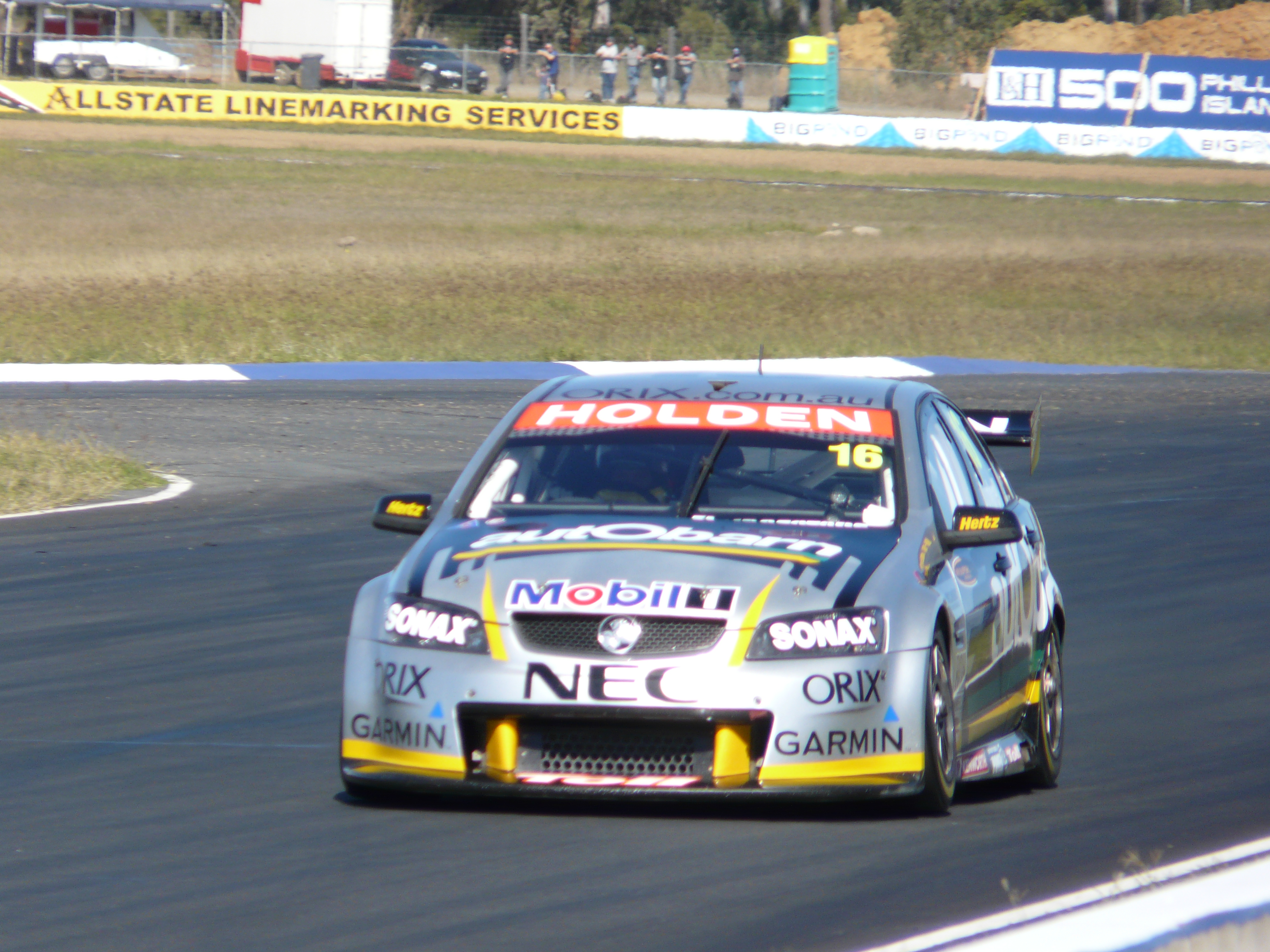
Paul Dumbrell at Queensland Raceway in July 2008

In 2005 Murphy was replaced by Garth Tander. At this point K-Mart concluded their sponsorship and the team became the HSV Dealer Team. Rick Kelly's entry was, however, rebranded as Team Buick for the V8 Supercars China Round. The team struggled through the early stages of 2005 before a late upturn in form. In 2006, Toll Group joined HSV as a title sponsor with the team becoming known as Toll HSV Dealer Team. The team then quickly became the dominant force of the championship with Rick Kelly winning the 2006 championship title and Tander doing likewise in 2007.

In 2008 Tander transferred, with the Toll sponsorship, to the Holden Racing Team and was replaced by Paul Dumbrell. As well as continuing HSV sponsorship, the team ran Autobarn colours for Dumbrell and Opes Prime colours for Kelly, Toll Group then rejoined the team midway through the season, following the collapse of Opes Prime. Rick Kelly won the team's final race at Oran Park Raceway in December 2008, which was also the final championship race held at the now-demolished circuit.

==== 2006 co-driver swap ====
For the endurance races in 2006, the HSV Dealer Team and the Holden Racing Team swapped drivers, primarily to split Tander and Kelly who were both in contention for the championship (being 1st and 2nd at that point). Tander joined Mark Skaife at HRT while Todd Kelly rejoined the team. A loophole in the regulations allowed the drivers to terminate their contracts with their respective teams. However while Kelly would finish second at both Sandown and Bathurst, Tander only managed twenty-seventh at Sandown and did not finish at Bathurst. The loophole was later closed.

=== Demise and legacy ===
At the end of 2008 John Kelly announced he would end his association with Walkinshaw Performance and establish Kelly Racing, with preparation handled by Perkins Engineering. The new team expanded to four cars and featured both Kelly brothers driving in the same team for the first time. The team continued to run Holden Commodore's, until partnering with Nissan for their return to the category in 2013. Unfortunately this association only lasted until 2019, the team continued as Kelly racing and ran the Nissan Altima's for that year under licence before downsizing to two cars and swapping to Ford Mustangs for 2020. In January 2021 Stephen Grove bought a 50% stake in the team and it was renamed Kelly Grove Racing, he would end up buying the remaining 50% 6 months later though and so for 2022 the team would become known as Grove Racing and the Kellys involvement seized.

Walkinshaw Performance decided to continue to race four cars, forming Walkinshaw Racing in 2009 to complement the HRT entries. Dumbrell remained with the Walkinshaw operation for 2009, joined by former HSV Dealer Team endurance co-driver David Reynolds. Walkinshaw Racing folded after the 2015 season as the operation downsized to two cars.

== Supercars results ==
=== Car No. 15 results ===
Year	Driver	No.	Make	1	2	3	4	5	6	7	8	9	10	11	12	13	14	15	16	17	18	19	20	21	22	23	24	25	26	27	28	29	30	31	32	33	34	35	36	37	38	39	40	Position	Pts
2001	Todd Kelly	15	Holden	PHI; R1; 8	PHI; R2; 7	ADE; R3; 15	ADE; R4; 5	EAS; R5; 16	EAS; R6; 8	HDV; R7; 18	HDV; R8; 8	HDV; R9; 20	CAN; R10; Ret	CAN; R11; 18	CAN; R12; 16	BAR; R13; 7	BAR; R14; 7	BAR; R15; 6	CAL; R16; 29	CAL; R17; Ret	CAL; R18; 21	ORA; R19; 4	ORA; R20; 8	QLD; R21; 3	WIN; R22; 11	WIN; R23; 25	BAT; R24; 3	PUK; R25; 8	PUK; R26; 18	PUK; R27; 5	SAN; R28; 3	SAN; R29; 1	SAN; R30; 3											6th	2479
2002	Todd Kelly	15	Holden	ADE; R1; 9	ADE; R2; 12	PHI; R3; 3	PHI; R4; 2	EAS; R5; 11	EAS; R6; 5	EAS; R7; 6	HDV; R8; 5	HDV; R9; 3	HDV; R10; 6	CAN; R11; 3	CAN; R12; 10	CAN; R13; 2	BAR; R14; 4	BAR; R15; Ret	BAR; R16; 5	ORA; R17; Ret	ORA; R18; Ret	WIN; R19; 3	WIN; R20; 2	QLD; R21; 10	BAT; R22; 13	SUR; R23; 7	SUR; R24; 3	PUK; R25; 5	PUK; R26; 4	PUK; R27; 1	SAN; R28; 4	SAN; R29; Ret												5th	1345
2003	Rick Kelly	15	Holden	ADE; R1; 9	ADE; R1; 24	PHI; R3; 11	EAS; R4; 9	WIN; R5; 11	BAR; R6; 10	BAR; R7; 9	BAR; R8; 4	HDV; R9; 14	HDV; R10; 7	HDV; R11; 18	QLD; R12; 9	ORA; R13; 24	SAN; R14; 3	BAT; R15; 1	SUR; R16; 5	SUR; R17; 7	PUK; R18; 8	PUK; R19; 13	PUK; R20; 5	EAS; R21; 25	EAS; R22; 10																			8th	1675
2004	Rick Kelly	15	Holden	ADE; R1; 12	ADE; R2; 6	EAS; R3; 1	PUK; R4; 7	PUK; R5; 4	PUK; R6; 5	HDV; R7; 6	HDV; R8; 1	HDV; R9; 21	BAR; R10; 4	BAR; R11; 2	BAR; R12; 4	QLD; R13; 15	WIN; R14; 2	ORA; R15; 30	ORA; R16; 9	SAN; R17; 5	BAT; R18; 1	SUR; R19; 21	SUR; R20; 25	SYM; R21; 1	SYM; R22; 2	SYM; R23; Ret	EAS; R24; 5	EAS; R25; Ret	EAS; R26; 15															6th	1793
2005	Rick Kelly	15	Holden	ADE; R1; 15	ADE; R2; 9	PUK; R3; 16	PUK; R4; Ret	PUK; R5; 15	BAR; R6; 14	BAR; R7; 16	BAR; R8; 15	EAS; R9; 31	EAS; R10; 14	SHA; R11; Ret	SHA; R12; 16	SHA; R13; Ret	HDV; R14; 9	HDV; R15; 5	HDV; R16; 3	QLD; R17; 15	ORA; R18; 5	ORA; R19; 6	SAN; R20; 4	BAT; R21; 16	SUR; R22; 9	SUR; R23; 5	SUR; R24; 6	SYM; R25; 3	SYM; R26; 4	SYM; R27; 2	PHI; R28; 4	PHI; R29; 4	PHI; R30; 3											8th	1630
2006	Rick Kelly	15	Holden	ADE; R1; 2	ADE; R2; 3	PUK; R3; 12	PUK; R4; 10	PUK; R5; 7	BAR; R6; 7	BAR; R7; 11	BAR; R8; 14	WIN; R9; 10	WIN; R10; 4	WIN; R11; 4	HDV; R12; 2	HDV; R13; 10	HDV; R14; 5	QLD; R15; 7	QLD; R16; 4	QLD; R17; 2	ORA; R18; 3	ORA; R19; 13	ORA; R20; 2	SAN; R21; 2	BAT; R22; 2	SUR; R23; 6	SUR; R24; 4	SUR; R25; 1	SYM; R26; 3	SYM; R27; 5	SYM; R28; 4	BHR; R29; 4	BHR; R30; 28	BHR; R31; 5	PHI; R32; 5	PHI; R33; 4	PHI; R34; 18							1st	3308
2007	Rick Kelly	1	Holden	ADE; R1; 4	ADE; R2; 1	BAR; R3; 2	BAR; R4; 2	BAR; R5; 3	PUK; R6; 3	PUK; R7; 3	PUK; R8; 1	WIN; R9; 3	WIN; R10; 3	WIN; R11; 3	EAS; R12; 3	EAS; R13; 2	EAS; R14; 4	HDV; R15; 2	HDV; R16; 2	HDV; R17; 2	QLD; R18; 7	QLD; R19; 16	QLD; R20; 6	ORA; R21; 2	ORA; R22; 15	ORA; R23; 15	SAN; R24; 2	BAT; R25; Ret	SUR; R26; 7	SUR; R27; 16	SUR; R28; 6	BHR; R29; 4	BHR; R30; 12	BHR; R31; 8	SYM; R32; 6	SYM; R33; 5	SYM; R34; Ret	PHI; R35; 5	PHI; R36; 8	PHI; R37; 10				4th	552
2008	Rick Kelly	15	Holden	ADE; R1; 8	ADE; R2; 6	EAS; R3; 4	EAS; R4; 6	EAS; R5; 2	HAM; R6; 2	HAM; R7; 6	HAM; R8; 4	BAR; R29; 6	BAR; R10; 6	BAR; R11; 5	SAN; R12; 7	SAN; R13; 12	SAN; R14; 17	HDV; R15; 9	HDV; R16; 9	HDV; R17; 6	QLD; R18; 8	QLD; R19; Ret	QLD; R20; 13	WIN; R21; 10	WIN; R22; 6	WIN; R23; 5	PHI; QR; 1	PHI; R24; 7	BAT; R25; 20	SUR; R26; Ret	SUR; R27; 6	SUR; R28; 5	BHR; R29; 9	BHR; R30; 22	BHR; R31; 20	SYM; R32; 19	SYM; R33; 9	SYM; R34; 8	ORA; R35; 9	ORA; R36; 4	ORA; R37; 1			7th	2430

=== Car No. 16 results ===
Year	Driver	No.	Make	1	2	3	4	5	6	7	8	9	10	11	12	13	14	15	16	17	18	19	20	21	22	23	24	25	26	27	28	29	30	31	32	33	34	35	36	37	38	39	40	Position	Pts
2001	Greg Murphy	51	Holden	PHI; R1; 5	PHI; R2; 3	ADE; R3; Ret	ADE; R4; 10	EAS; R5; 1	EAS; R6; 11	HID; R7; 4	HID; R8; 1	HID; R9; 12	CAN; R10; 12	CAN; R11; Ret	CAN; R12; Ret	BAR; R13; 5	BAR; R14; 4	BAR; R15; 3	CAL; R16; 17	CAL; R17; 14	CAL; R18; 8	ORA; R19; Ret	ORA; R20; 11	QLD; R21; 3	WIN; R22; 1	WIN; R23; 6	BAT; R24; 3	PUK; R25; 1	PUK; R26; 1	PUK; R27; 1	SAN; R28; 8	SAN; R29; 2	SAN; R30; Ret											4th	2724
2002	Greg Murphy	51	Holden	ADE; R1; 2	ADE; R2; 2	PHI; R3; DSQ	PHI; R4; 17	EAS; R5; 4	EAS; R6; 7	EAS; R7; 5	HID; R8; 4	HID; R9; 4	HID; R10; 3	CAN; R11; Ret	CAN; R12; Ret	CAN; R13; 4	BAR; R14; 3	BAR; R15; 1	BAR; R16; 3	ORA; R17; Ret	ORA; R18; 23	WIN; R19; 5	WIN; R20; 3	QLD; R21; 10	BAT; R22; 13	SUR; R23; 1	SUR; R24; 18	PUK; R25; 2	PUK; R26; 1	PUK; R27; 4	SAN; R28; 2	SAN; R29; 3												2nd	1569
2003	Greg Murphy	51	Holden	ADE; R1; 10	ADE; R2; 11	PHI; R3; 3	EAS; R4; 5	WIN; R5; 14	BAR; R6; 1	BAR; R7; 4	BAR; R8; 3	HID; R9; 6	HID; R10; 5	HID; R11; 2	QLD; R12; 8	ORA; R13; 11	SAN; R14; 3	BAT; R15; 1	SUR; R16; 2	SUR; R17; 2	PUK; R18; 1	PUK; R19; 1	PUK; R20; 3	EAS; R21; 23	EAS; R22; Ret																			2nd	1983
2004	Greg Murphy	51	Holden	ADE; R1; 4	ADE; R2; 9	EAS; R3; 5	PUK; R4; 4	PUK; R5; 2	PUK; R6; 2	HID; R7; 13	HID; R8; 4	HID; R9; 4	BAR; R10; 7	BAR; R11; 3	BAR; R12; 16	QLD; R13; Ret	WIN; R14; 5	ORA; R15; 11	ORA; R16; 12	SAN; R17; 5	BAT; R18; 1	SUR; R19; 2	SUR; R20; 1	SYM; R21; 11	SYM; R22; 4	SYM; R23; 4	EAS; R24; 13	EAS; R25; 24	EAS; R26; 18															4th	1913
2005	Garth Tander	16	Holden	ADE; R1; 7	ADE; R2; Ret	PUK; R3; 17	PUK; R4; 20	PUK; R5; 9	BAR; R6; 29	BAR; R7; 14	BAR; R8; 13	EAS; R9; 9	EAS; R10; 10	SHA; R11; 12	SHA; R12; 21	SHA; R13; 22	HDV; R14; 5	HDV; R15; 3	HDV; R16; 1	QLD; R17; 3	ORA; R18; 26	ORA; R19; 5	SAN; R20; 4	BAT; R21; 16	SUR; R22; 10	SUR; R23; 4	SUR; R24; 4	SYM; R25; 1	SYM; R26; 1	SYM; R27; 1	PHI; R28; 2	PHI; R29; 2	PHI; R30; 4											6th	1734
2006	Garth Tander	16	Holden	ADE; R1; 8	ADE; R2; 4	PUK; R3; 20	PUK; R4; 1	PUK; R5; 4	BAR; R6; 4	BAR; R7; 10	BAR; R8; 5	WIN; R9; 6	WIN; R10; 10	WIN; R11; 5	HDV; R12; 5	HDV; R13; 8	HDV; R14; 3	QLD; R15; 1	QLD; R16; 2	QLD; R17; 1	ORA; R18; Ret	ORA; R19; 21	ORA; R20; 5	SAN; R21; 26	BAT; R22; Ret	SUR; R23; 2	SUR; R24; 1	SUR; R25; 19	SYM; R26; 4	SYM; R27; 1	SYM; R28; 1	BHR; R29; 2	BHR; R30; 1	BHR; R31; 8	PHI; R32; 2	PHI; R33; 18	PHI; R34; 2							4th	2965
2007	Garth Tander	16	Holden	ADE; R1; 6	ADE; R2; 10	BAR; R3; 1	BAR; R4; 1	BAR; R5; 1	PUK; R6; 1	PUK; R7; 1	PUK; R8; 8	WIN; R9; 4	WIN; R10; 1	WIN; R11; 1	EAS; R12; 5	EAS; R13; 15	EAS; R14; 5	HDV; R15; 6	HDV; R16; 3	HDV; R17; 3	QLD; R18; 1	QLD; R19; 1	QLD; R20; 1	ORA; R21; Ret	ORA; R22; 19	ORA; R23; 2	SAN; R24; 4	BAT; R25; Ret	SUR; R26; 1	SUR; R27; 1	SUR; R28	BHR; R29; 2	BHR; R30; 14	BHR; R31; 4	SYM; R32; 1	SYM; R33; 10	SYM; R34; Ret	PHI; R35; 1	PHI; R36; 1	PHI; R37; 4				1st	625
2008	Paul Dumbrell	16	Holden	ADE; R1	ADE; R2	EAS; R3	EAS; R4	EAS; R5	HAM; R6	HAM; R7	HAM; R8	BAR; R9	BAR; R10	BAR; R11	SAN; R12	SAN; R13	SAN; R14	HDV; R15	HDV; R16	HDV; R17	QLD; R18	QLD; R19	QLD; R20	WIN; R21	WIN; R22	WIN; R23	PHI; Q	PHI; R24	BAT; R25	SUR; R26	SUR; R27	SUR; R28	BHR; R29	BHR; R30	BHR; R31	SYM; R32	SYM; R33	SYM; R34	ORA; R35	ORA; R36	ORA; R37			21st	1398

== V8 Supercar drivers ==
The following is a list of drivers who have driven for the team in V8 Supercars, in order of their first appearance. Drivers who only drove for the team on a part-time basis are listed in italics.

- (New Zealand) Greg Murphy (2001–04)
- (Australia) Todd Kelly (2001–02, 2006)
- (Australia) Rick Kelly (2001, 2003–08)
- (Australia) Nathan Pretty (2001)
- (France) Yvan Muller (2002)
- (United Kingdom) Andy Priaulx (2002–03)
- (Australia) Cameron McLean (2003)
- (Australia) Tim Leahey (2004–05)
- (Australia) Steve Owen (2004)
- (Australia) Garth Tander (2005–07)
- (Australia) Mark Noske (2005)
- (Australia) Anthony Tratt (2006)
- (Australia) Tony D'Alberto (2006)
- (New Zealand) Craig Baird (2007)
- (New Zealand) Paul Radisich (2007–08)
- (Australia) Paul Dumbrell (2008)
- (Australia) David Reynolds (2008)
