= Tasman Motorsport =

Australian V8 Supercar racing team

- Team Principal: Kevin Murphy
- Debut: 2004
- Final Season: 2009
- Round wins: 0
- Pole positions: 1

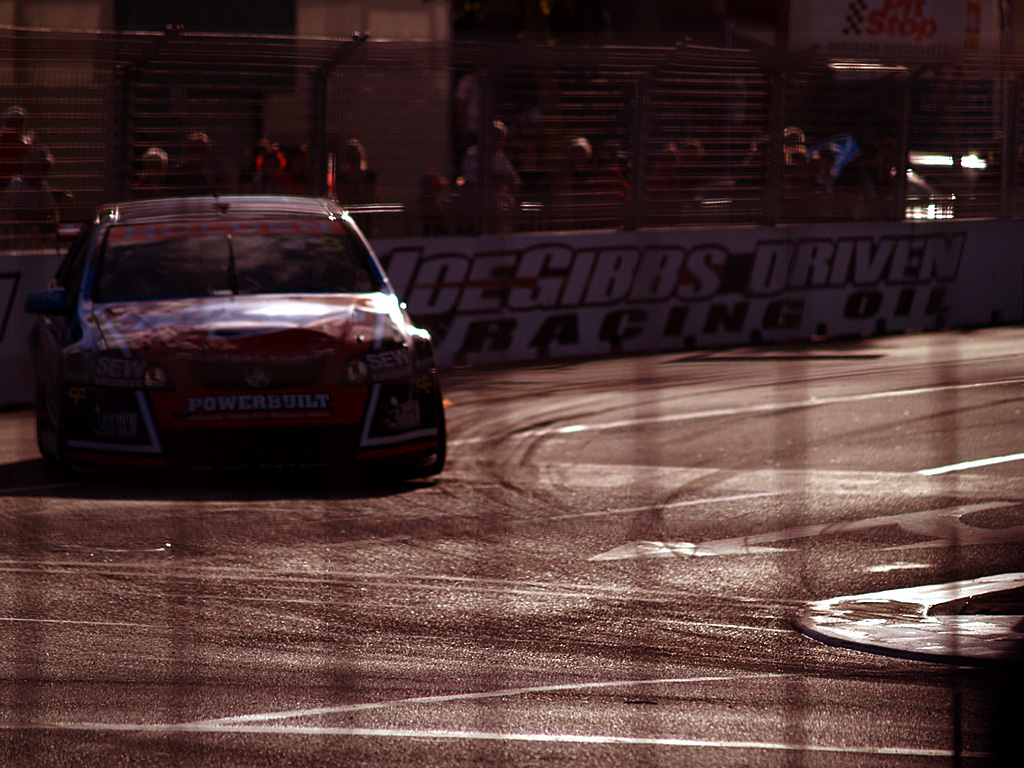
Jason Richards's Holden VE Commodore at Hamilton Street Circuit in April 2008.

Tasman Motorsport was a V8 Supercar racing team. It was formed in 2004 out of what was Lansvale Racing Team V8 Supercar team and was associated with Greg Murphy Racing as a satellite operation.

Tasman Motorsport entered the series in 2004, with a single Holden VX Commodore which was driven by Jason Richards. At the Queensland Raceway round they introduced a VY Commodore and then entered the VX as car #43 for Fabian Coulthard for the Oran Park Raceway round.

2005 saw the team upgrade to a two car operation and move to a new factory near Melbourne, from their previous site in Sydney. With internet service provider Dodo the naming sponsor of the team, both Jason Richards, and Jamie Whincup, had some very good placings including third at the Sandown 500 and second in the Bathurst 1000 This was all after Richards was still recovering after he had one of V8 Supercar's biggest ever accidents at Queensland Raceway barrel rolling at least 6 times after a tag from Paul Morris.

2006 saw improved pace with drivers Jason Richards and Andrew Jones. Armed with many sponsors for the year, including Firepower, SEW Eurodrive and Sleepyhead Bedding, Tasman Motorsport won their first V8 race, with Jason Richards at Winton Motor Raceway in June. At the same event the team got their best qualifying result of third on the grid. Later on in the season the team announced their plans to recruit Greg Murphy for the following 2007 Season.

2007 saw the début of the VE Commodore in V8 Supercars and the team opening a base in New Zealand. Championship wise the team finished 13th and 14th with Murphy and Richards respectively and both nearly stole a Bathurst 1000 victory but finished as the highest Holden, in 4th place. Later on in the season the team announced that Rockstar Energy Drinks would come on board as a sponsor for the last two rounds of the season. The team were on the way to secure sponsorship (with Rockstar) for the 2008 season but at the last minute pulled out.

2008 saw Sprint Gas become the naming rights sponsor for what was due to be a three-year deal. Murphy and Richards started the season promisingly finishing 7th and 9th overall at the Clipsal 500 in Adelaide. More top 10 results at the next round at Eastern Creek means that Murphy comes into the next round at Hamilton in 7th place with 330 points. Criticism was received around the rushed livery that Tasman were running and the team designed a new livery for the Hamilton 400.

2009 saw Jason Bargwanna come in and replace Jason Richards in the #3 Sprint Gas Racing VE Commodore. Despite a standout performance at the 2009 Bathurst 1000 which saw both cars finish in the top six, the team announced it would not be continuing into 2010 and its V8 Supercar Racing Entitlement Contracts were for sale. The team cited lack of funding for 2010 as the reasons for closure.

== See also ==
Greg Murphy Racing
