= 2008 Australian Production Car Championship =

Auto racing title

The 2008 Australian Production Car Championship was a CAMS sanctioned Australian motor racing title for drivers of Group 3E Series Production Cars. The title was awarded in conjunction with the 2008 Australian Manufacturers' Championship and was the 15th Australian Production Car Championship.

The championship was won by Colin Osborne, driving a Toyota Celica.

== Schedule ==
The championship was contested over a four-round series with all rounds run concurrently with those of the 2008 Australian Manufacturers' Championship.

Round	Circuit	State	Date	Format
1	Phillip Island Grand Prix Circuit	Victoria	14–15 June	Two races
2	Oran Park Raceway	New South Wales	30–31 August	Three races
3	Symmons Plains International Raceway	Tasmania	19–20 September	Three races
4	Sandown International Motor Raceway	Victoria	29–30 November	Two races

== Classes ==
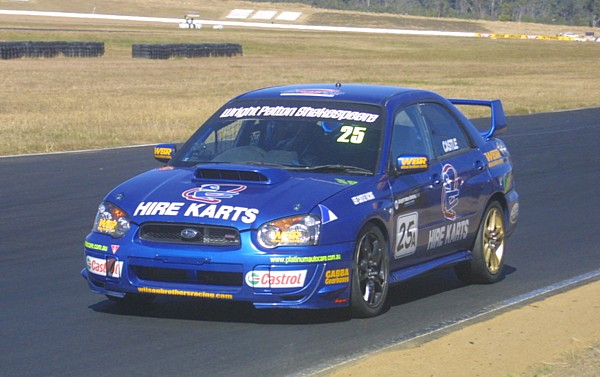
Lee Castle placed third in the championship driving a Subaru Impreza WRX. (Image from non-championship race at Queensland Raceway in 2008.)

Cars competed in six classes:

- Class A: High Performance Vehicles All Wheel Drive (under $125k)
- Class B: High Performance Vehicles Rear Wheel Drive (under $125k)
- Class C: Hot Hatches and Sedans
- Class D: Production Sports
- Class E: Four Cylinder Sedans and Hatches
- Class F: Eco Diesel/Hybrid (No Class F cars competed in the championship)

== Points ==
Points were awarded to registered drivers for class placings achieved at each race on varying scales depending on the number of competitors in each class at each round.

- Where six or more cars attempted to qualify for a class, championship points were awarded to registered drivers on a 30–25–22–20–18–16–14–12–10–8 basis for the first ten finishers in that class in each race.
- Where four or five cars attempted to qualify for a class, championship points were awarded to registered drivers on a 25–20–16–12–10 basis for the first six finishers in the class in each race.
- Where one, two or three cars attempted to qualify for a class, championship points were awarded to registered drivers on a 20–14–10 basis for the first three finishers in the class in each race.

No points were awarded for outright race placings.

For Rounds 1 & 4, co-drivers, where nominated, were eligible to score points so long as they were registered for the Championship.

== Results ==
Position	Driver	No.	Car	Class	Entrant	Phi.	Ora.	Sym.	San.	Total
1	Colin Osborne	13	Toyota Celica	D	Osborne Motorsport	45	65	60	55	225
2	George Miedecke	7	Hyundai Tiburon	D	Hyundai Motor Company	45	70	50	48	213
3	Lee Castle	25	Subaru Impreza WRX STi	A	Wilson Bros Racing	28	53	60	34	175
4	Jake Camilleri	36	Mazda 3 MPS	C	Grand Prix Mazda	40	60	40	25	165
5	Trevor Keene	50	Mini Cooper S	D	Midwest Multimedia	12	36	57	47	152
6	Lauren Gray	15	Toyota Echo	E	Powron / Car Fresh	28	54	48	20	150
7	Chris Delfsma	21	FPV BF GT	B	Century 21 Hazelbrook	24	20	60	40	144
8	Stuart Jones	31	Toyota Celica	D	Osborne Motorsport	16	28	40	42	126
9	Jamie Augustine	40	Hyundai Sonata	E	Kangan Batman TAFE / Hankook	40	48	0	34	122
10	Des Wall	43	Mitsubishi Lancer Evo IX GSR	A	Easts Holiday Parks	40	0	42	20	102
11	Garry Holt	20	BMW 335i	B	Eastern Creek Karts / 2UE	40	48	0	0	88
12	Craig Hendrick	72	Toyota Celica	D	MAC Coatings	32	40	0	0	72
13	Steve Briffa	8	HSV E Series	B	McGrath Holden / Briffa Smash	0	0	60	10	70
14	Barry Morcom	11	BMW 335i	B	Rondo Building Services	14	54	0	0	68
15	Andrew Miedecke	9	Mitsubishi Lancer Evo IX RS	A	Cerasport/ CMA Recycling	0	65	0	0	65
16	John Bowe	21	FPV BF GT	B	Century 21 Hazelbrook	24	0	0	40	64
17	Brett Youlden	40	Hyundai Sonata	E	Kangan Batman TAFE / Hankook	0	0	54	0	54
18	Trevor Symonds	43	Mitsubishi Lancer Evo IX GSR	A	Easts Holiday Parks	0	52	0	0	52
19	Allan Shephard	27	BMW 130i	C	GWS Personnel	24	24	0	0	48
20	Steve Briffa	8	Holden VZ Commodore SS	C	Briffa Smash Repairs	14	28	0	0	42
21	Michael Gray	5	Toyota Corolla	D	Powcon / Stuart Robson Wholesale	0	0	0	38	38
22	Bob Pearson	38	Mitsubishi Lancer Evo XIII	A	Pro Duct Motorsport	0	37	0	0	37
=	Jeremy Gray	14	Ford FG Falcon XR6 Turbo	C	JMG Racing	0	0	0	37	37
=	Darren Gillis	14	Ford FG Falcon XR6 Turbo	C	JMG Racing	0	0	0	37	37
25	Bruce Tomlinson	28	BMW 130i	C	GWS Personnel	0	0	0	36	36
=	Richard Buttrose	28	BMW 130i	C	GWS Personnel	0	0	0	36	36
27	Peter O'Donnell	72	Toyota Celica	D	MAC Coatings	0	0	0	32	32
28	Gerard Keogh	32	HSV E Series	B	Gerard Keogh	0	0	0	28	28
29	Amber Anderson	88	Holden Vectra	E	Briffa Smash	0	0	0	24	24
30	Bob Brewer	60	Holden VY Commodore	C	Professional Traffic Solutions	0	0	0	20	20
31	Brian Smallwood	26	Subaru Impreza WRX STi	A	Wilson Bros Racing	10	0	0	0	10
	Class A: High Performance Vehicles All Wheel Drive (under $125k)									
1	Lee Castle	25	Subaru Impreza WRX STi	A	Wilson Bros Racing	28	53	60	34	175
2	Des Wall	43	Mitsubishi Lancer Evo IX GSR	A	Easts Holiday Parks	40	0	42	20	102
3	Andrew Miedecke	9	Mitsubishi Lancer Evo IX RS	A	Cerasport/ CMA Recycling	0	65	0	0	65
4	Trevor Symonds	43	Mitsubishi Lancer Evo IX GSR	A	Easts Holiday Parks	0	52	0	0	52
5	Bob Pearson	38	Mitsubishi Lancer Evo VIII	A	Pro Duct Motorsport	0	37	0	0	37
6	Brian Smallwood	26	Subaru Impreza WRX STi	A	Wilson Bros Racing	10	0	0	0	10
	Class B: High Performance Vehicles Rear Wheel Drive (under $125k)									
1	Chris Delfsma	21	FPV BF GT	B	Century 21 Hazelbrook	24	20	60	40	144
2	Garry Holt	20	BMW 335i	B	Eastern Creek Karts / 2UE	40	48	0	0	88
3	Steve Briffa	8	HSV E Series	B	McGrath Holden / Briffa Smash	0	0	60	10	70
4	Barry Morcom	11	BMW 335i	B	Rondo Building Services	14	54	0	0	68
5	John Bowe	21	FPV BF GT	B	Century 21 Hazelbrook	24	0	0	40	64
6	Gerard Keogh	32	HSV E Series	B	Gerard Keogh	0	0	0	28	28
	Class C: Hot Hatches and Sedans									
1	Jake Camilleri	36	Mazda 3 MPS	C	Grand Prix Mazda	40	60	40	25	165
2	Allan Shephard	27	BMW 130i	C	GWS Personnel	24	24	0	0	48
3	Steve Briffa	8	Holden VZ Commodore SS	C	Briffa Smash Repairs	14	28	0	0	42
4	Jeremy Gray	14	Ford FG Falcon XR6 Turbo	C	JMG Racing	0	0	0	37	37
5	Darren Gillis	14	Ford FG Falcon XR6 Turbo	C	JMG Racing	0	0	0	37	37
6	Bruce Tomlinson	28	BMW 130i	C	GWS Personnel	0	0	0	36	36
7	Richard Buttrose	28	BMW 130i	C	GWS Personnel	0	0	0	36	36
8	Bob Brewer	60	Holden VY Commodore	C	Professional Traffic Solutions	0	0	0	20	20
	Class D: Production Sports									
1	Colin Osborne	13	Toyota Celica	D	Osborne Motorsport	45	65	60	55	225
2	George Miedecke	7	Hyundai Tiburon	D	Hyundai Motor Company	45	70	50	48	213
3	Trevor Keene	50	Mini Cooper S	D	Midwest Multimedia	12	36	57	47	152
4	Stuart Jones	31	Toyota Celica	D	Osborne Motorsport	16	28	40	42	126
5	Craig Hendrick	72	Toyota Celica	D	MAC Coatings	32	40	0	0	72
6	Michael Gray	5	Toyota Corolla	D	Powcon / Stuart Robson Wholesale	0	0	0	38	38
7	Peter O'Donnell	72	Toyota Celica	D	MAC Coatings	0	0	0	32	32
	Class E: Four Cylinder Sedans and Hatches									
1	Lauren Gray	15	Toyota Echo	E	Powron / Car Fresh	28	54	48	20	150
2	Jamie Augustine	40	Hyundai Sonata	E	Kangan Batman TAFE / Hankook	40	48	0	34	122
3	Brett Youlden	40	Hyundai Sonata	E	Kangan Batman TAFE / Hankook	0	0	54	0	54
4	Amber Anderson	88	Holden Vectra	E	Briffa Smash	0	0	0	24	24

== See also ==
- 2008 Australian Manufacturers' Championship, which was contested concurrently with the 2008 Australian Production Car Championship.
