= 2008 Australian Manufacturers' Championship =

The 2008 Australian Manufacturers' Championship was a CAMS sanctioned motor racing title for car manufacturers. The championship, which was open to Group 3E Series Production Cars was the 23rd Australian Manufacturers' Championship.

== Schedule ==
The title was contested concurrently with the 2008 Australian Production Car Championship over a four-round series.

- Round 1, Phillip Island Grand Prix Circuit, Victoria, 14–15 June
- Round 2, Oran Park Raceway, New South Wales, 30–31 August
- Round 3, Symmons Plains International Raceway, Tasmania, 19–20 September
- Round 4, Sandown International Motor Raceway, Victoria, 29–30 November

Rounds 1 & 4 were contested over two races and Rounds 2 & 3 over three races.

== Classes ==
Cars competed in six classes:

- Class A: High Performance Vehicles All Wheel Drive (under $125k)
- Class B: High Performance Vehicles Rear Wheel Drive (under $125k)
- Class C: Hot Hatches and Sedans
- Class D: Production Sports
- Class E: Four Cylinder Sedans and Hatches
- Class F: Eco Diesel/Hybrid

== Points ==
A manufacturer that had registered for the championship could specify up to two "nominated point scoring automobiles". Points were awarded for class placings achieved by these cars at each race on varying scales depending on the number of competitors in each class at each round.

- Where six or more cars attempted to qualify for a class, championship points were awarded on a 30–25–22–20–18–16–14–12–10–8 basis for the first ten finishers in that class in each race.
- Where four or five cars attempted to qualify for a class, championship points were awarded on a 25–20–16–12–10 basis for the first six finishers in the class in each race.
- Where one, two or three cars attempted to qualify for a class, championship points were awarded on a 20–14–10 basis for the first three finishers in the class in each race.

No points were awarded for outright race placings.

== Results ==
Position	Manufacturer	Nominated Car	Driver	Class	R1	R2	R3	R4	Total	Grand Total
1	Hyundai	Hyundai Tiburon #7	George Miedecke	D	45	70	50	48	213	389
1	Hyundai	Hyundai Sonata #40	Jamie Augustine & Brett Youlden	E	40	48	54	34	176	389
2	Toyota	Toyota Celica #13	Colin Osborne	D	45	65	60	55	225	351
2	Toyota	Toyota Celica #31	Stuart Jones	E	16	28	40	42	126	351
