= Holden Commodore (VZ) =

Australian full-size car

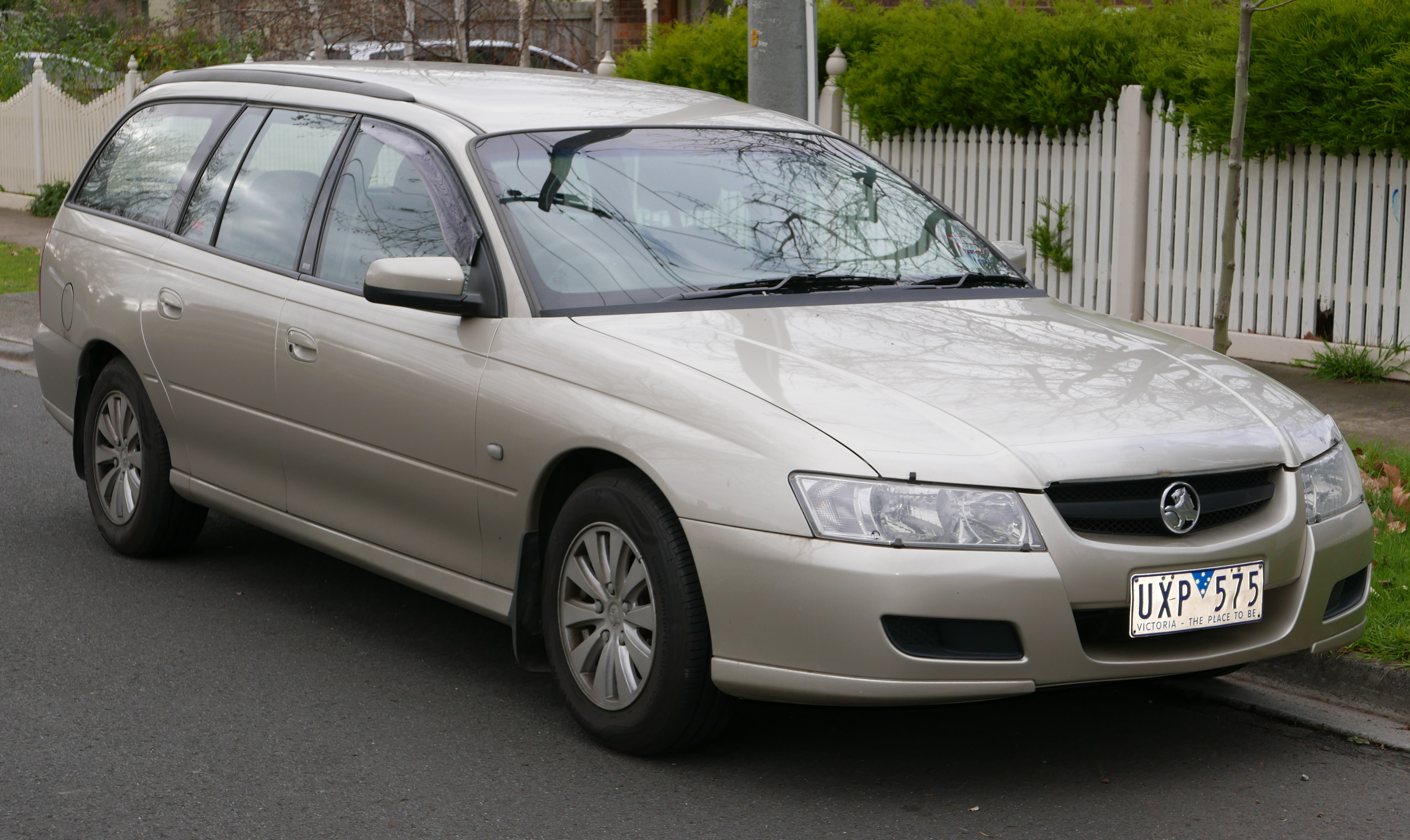
- 2006 Holden Commodore (VZ) Acclaim Wagon

Overview
- Manufacturer: Holden (General Motors)
- Also called: Holden Adventra (VZ); Holden Berlina (VZ); Holden Calais (VZ); Holden Crewman (VZ); Holden Monaro (VZ); Holden One Tonner (VZ); Holden Ute (VZ); Chevrolet Lumina; Chevrolet Omega
- Production: August 2004 – July 2006 (sedan); August 2004 – August 2007 (wagon, utility)
- Assembly: Australia: Adelaide, South Australia (Elizabeth)
- Designer: Mike Simcoe

Body and chassis
- Class: Full-size
- Body style: 4-door sedan 4-door station wagon 2-door coupe utility
- Layout: Front-engine, rear-wheel-drive
- Platform: GM V platform
- Related: Opel Omega B Cadillac Catera; Holden Statesman/Caprice (WL); Holden One Tonner (VY); Holden Monaro (VZ); HSV Z Series

Powertrain
- Engine: 3.6 L Alloytec 175 (LE0) V6; 3.6 L Alloytec 190 (LY7) V6; 5.7 L Gen III (LS1) V8; 6.0 L Gen IV (L76) V8; 6.0 L Gen IV (L98) V8; 6.0 L Gen IV (LS2) V8 (HSV only)
- Transmission: 4-speed 4L60-E automatic (V6, V8 5.7 L); 4-speed 4L65-E automatic (V8 6.0 L); 5-speed 5L40-E automatic (V6 190KW); 6-speed Aisin D173 manual (V6); 6-speed Tremec T56 manual (V8)

Dimensions
- Wheelbase: 2,788 mm (109.8 in) (sedan); 2,938 mm (115.7 in) (wagon, utility)
- Length: 4,876–5,033 mm (192.0–198.1 in)
- Width: 1,842–1,847 mm (72.5–72.7 in)
- Height: 1,440–1,527 mm (56.7–60.1 in)
- Kerb weight: 1,569–1,654 kg (3,459–3,646 lb)

Chronology
- Predecessor: Holden Commodore (VY)
- Successor: Holden Commodore (VE); Holden Commodore Calais Tourer (ZB) (for Adventra)

The Holden Commodore (VZ) is a full-size car that was produced by Holden from 2004 to 2006 as a sedan and to 2007 as a wagon and Ute sold alongside the new VE series. It was the fourth and final iteration of the third generation of the Commodore and the last to spawn a coupé variant. Its range continued to include the luxury variants, Holden Berlina (VZ) and Holden Calais (VZ).

== Overview ==
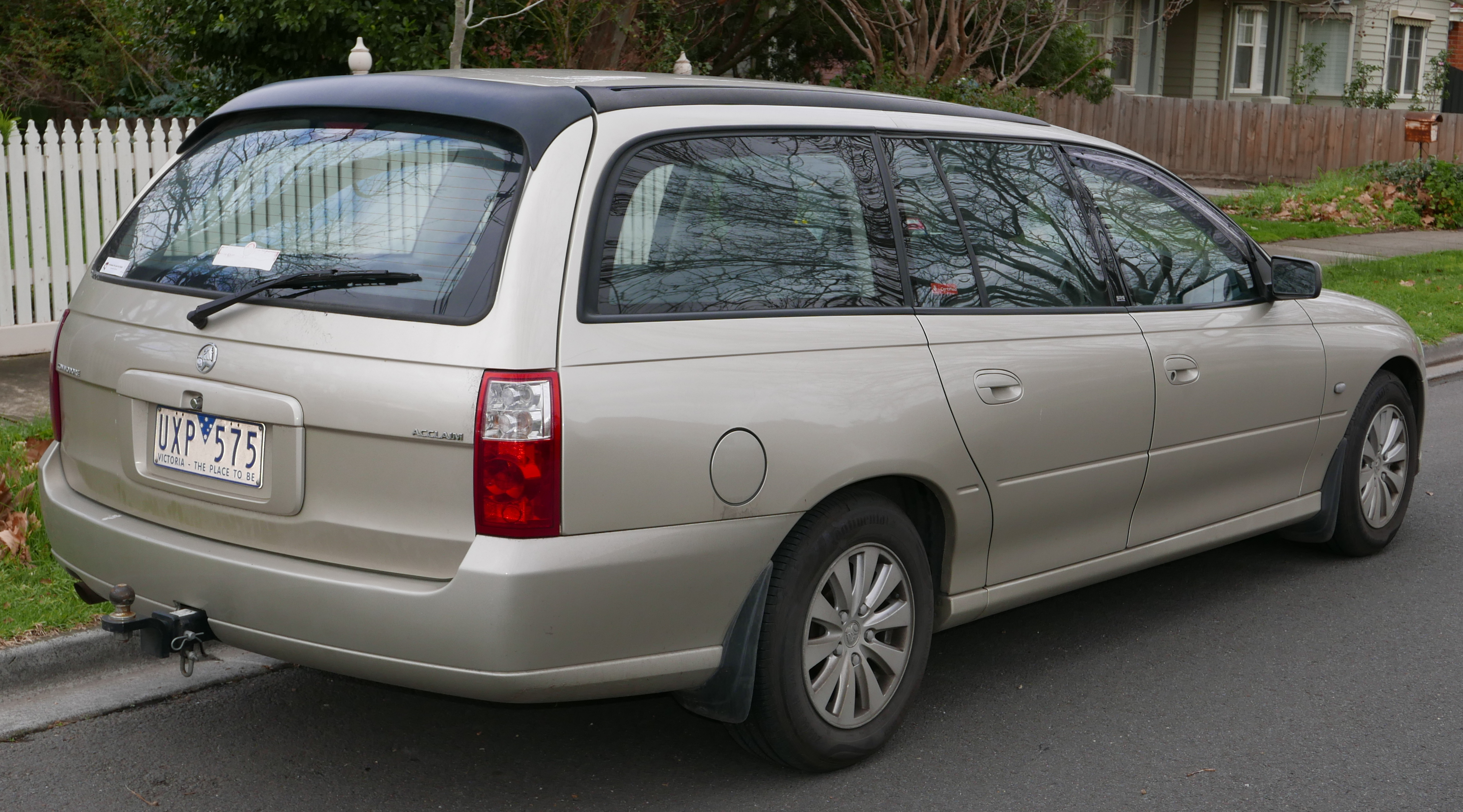
The station wagon version of the VZ Commodore was only available in the Executive, Acclaim (pictured), Berlina, SVZ and Lumina variants

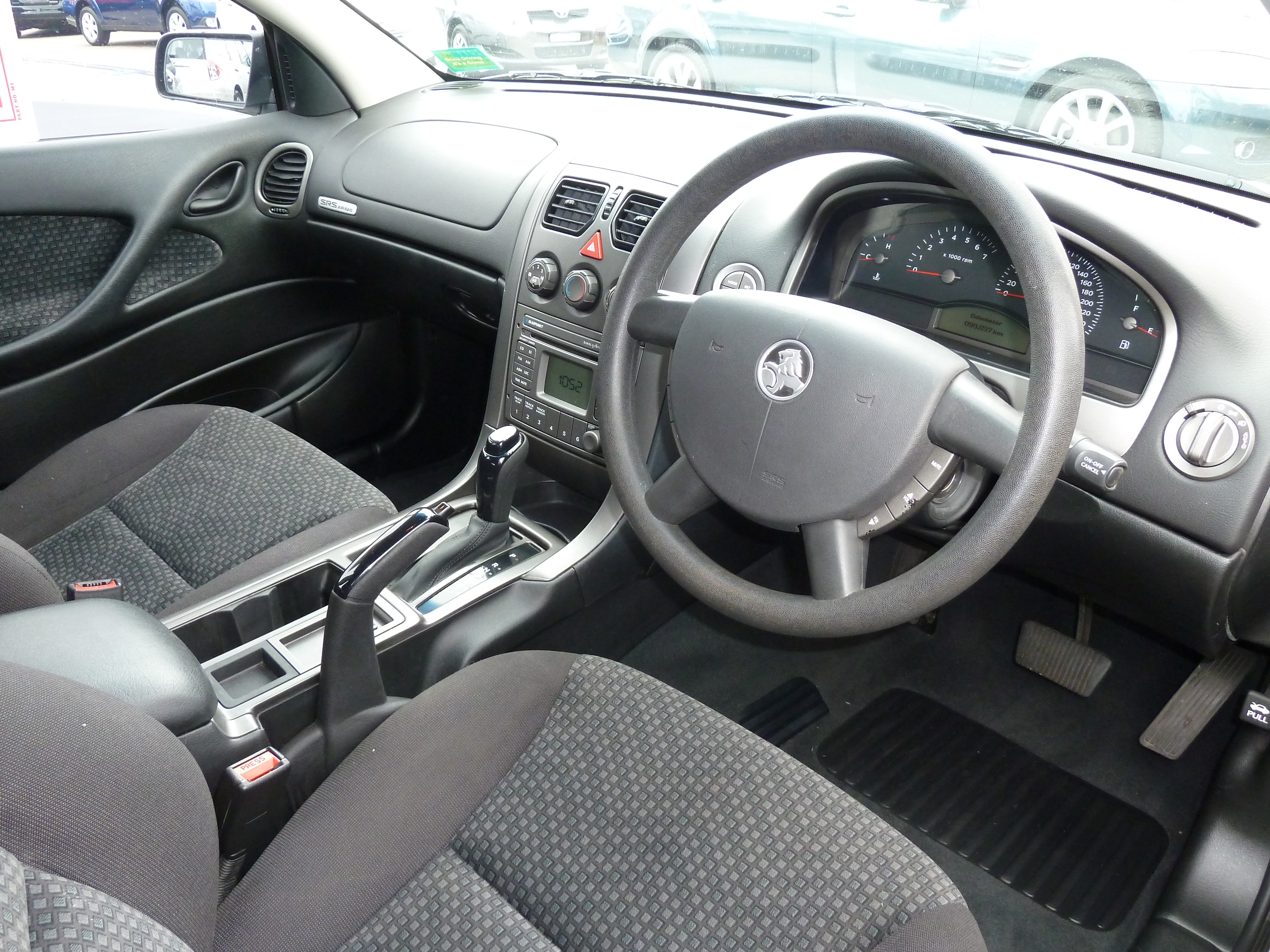
Interior

Released in August 2004, the VZ series was a minor facelift of the previous VY series that featured a new V6 engine in different tune guises. The powerplants included 175 and 190 kW (235 and 255 hp), 3.6-litre Alloytec V6 engines in place of the older 3.8-litre Ecotec V6. Other changes to the V6 was the loss of the supercharger that was included in the S models from the VT to VY, this was also dropped with the 3.8-litre and would not be used with the new 3.6. These new Alloytec DOHC engines have carried on through to the Holden Commodore (VE) which was released in July 2006. A new 5L40-E 5-speed automatic transmission was introduced on the sports and luxury V6 variants.

The advanced 3.6-litre Alloytec engines were more powerful, responsive and fuel-efficient than the outgoing Ecotec V6. To achieve 190 kW (255 hp), the Alloytec V6 gains variable valve timing on both inlet and exhaust sides as well as a dual stage intake manifold, while the 175 kW (235 hp) version retains variable valve timing on the inlet side only. Selected models bring advanced active safety features that electronically assist the driver to maintain vehicle control in emergency situations.

The VZ Commodore was available in several model variations, most of which carried over from the VY range, with the exception of the newly introduced SV6, a specification level that replaced the S range. All models in the Commodore range (Executive, Acclaim, Berlina, Calais, SV6, SV8 and SS) were available as sedans, while wagon variants of the Executive, Acclaim and Berlina were available. Berlina and Calais models were not badged or marketed as Commodores. The VZ was the last Commodore line-up to use the Executive and Acclaim trim levels.

The VZ is notable for being the only Commodore series of recent times to not officially introduce a Series II update to the range, however, a number of mechanical changes were made in January 2006, designated MY06. At this point, Holden introduced the new L76 6.0-litre V8 to its range to replace the outgoing LS1. The L76 has been slightly detuned, and both Displacement on Demand and variable valve timing have been disabled, while the L98 variant used later does not have any Displacement on Demand or variable valve timing hardware installed. The L76 was used until July 2006 (the release of the VE series), when Holden switched to the L98 until the VZ range ended production.

The base V6 also went from 175 to 172 kW (235 to 231 hp) and the High Output V6 went from 340 to 335 N⋅m (251 to 247 lb⋅ft) at the same time, to meet new ADR 79/01 (Euro III) emissions standards effective from 1 January 2006.

Sales of the VZ series failed to match those of the preceding VY in light of rising small car sales, higher fuel prices and growing interest in the whole new replacement, the VE series.

The VZ Commodore sedans were superseded by the VE series on 10 July 2006, whilst the wagon and utility ranges lived on for almost another year. VZ Ute production ended in August 2007, whilst the last wagon rolled off Holden's Elizabeth plant line on 6 September 2007.

== Models ==
=== Executive ===
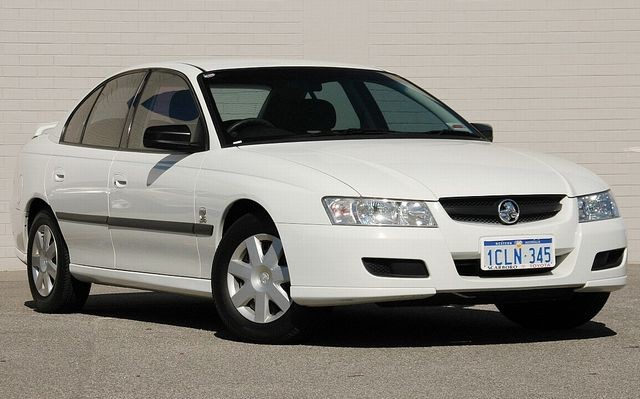

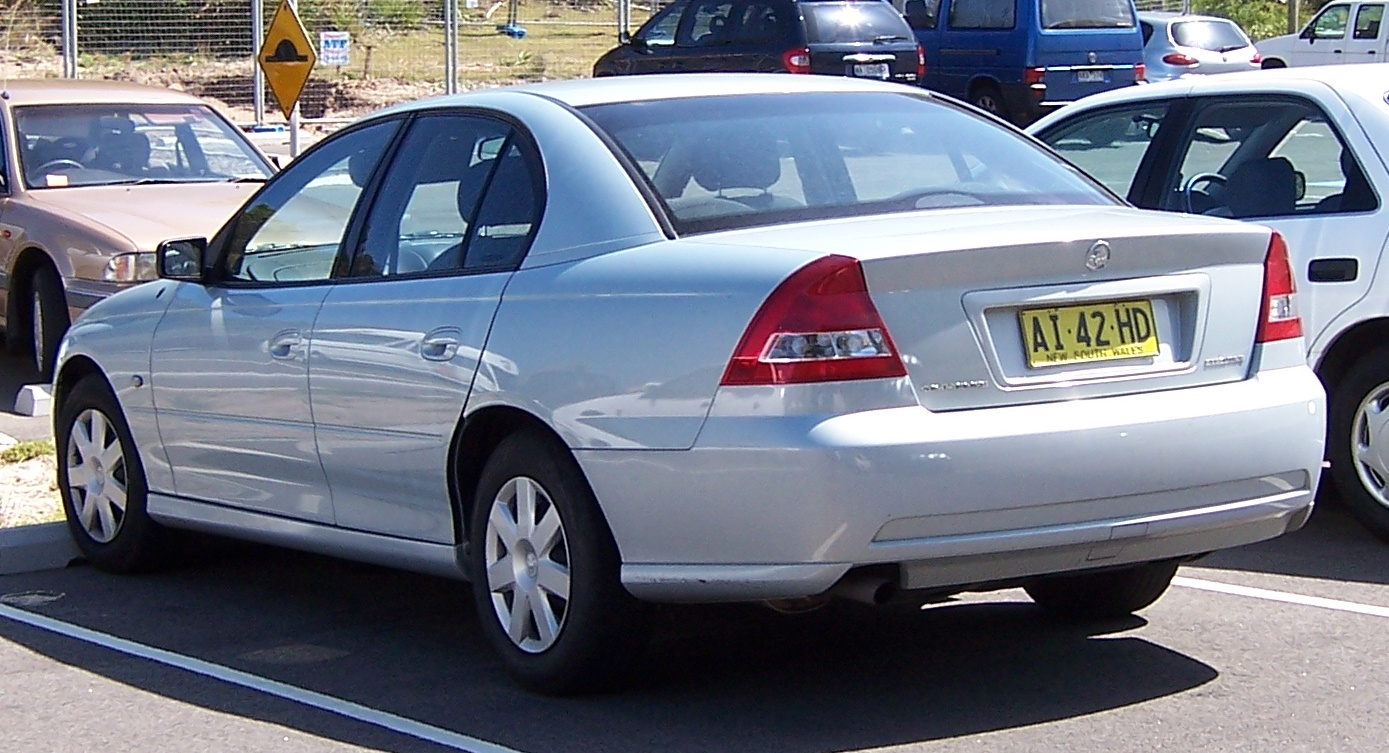
Commodore Executive sedan

The Executive was the baseline model. The VZ series was the last one to include this nameplate, which was first introduced in 1984.

The Commodore Executive standard features included:

- 3.6 L 175 kW (238 PS; 235 hp) Alloytec V6 engine (updated to 3.6 L 172 kW (234 PS; 231 hp) Alloytec V6 engine in January 2006)
- 4-speed automatic transmission
- Anti-lock braking system (ABS)
- Auto headlights
- Brake assist (BA)
- Cruise control
- Driver's and passenger's airbags
- Electronic brakeforce distribution (EBD)
- Front power windows
- Power antenna
- Power socket in centre console
- Quad cupholders
- Security system
- Single disc CD player
- Steering wheel audio controls
- Trip computer
- 15-inch steel wheels

The Commodore Executive optional features included:

- Air conditioning
- Alloy wheels
- Country pack suspension
- FE2 sports suspension
- Rear park assist (available on sedan only)
- Satellite navigation (only available on the sedan)
- Side Impact Airbags (SIAB)

=== Acclaim ===
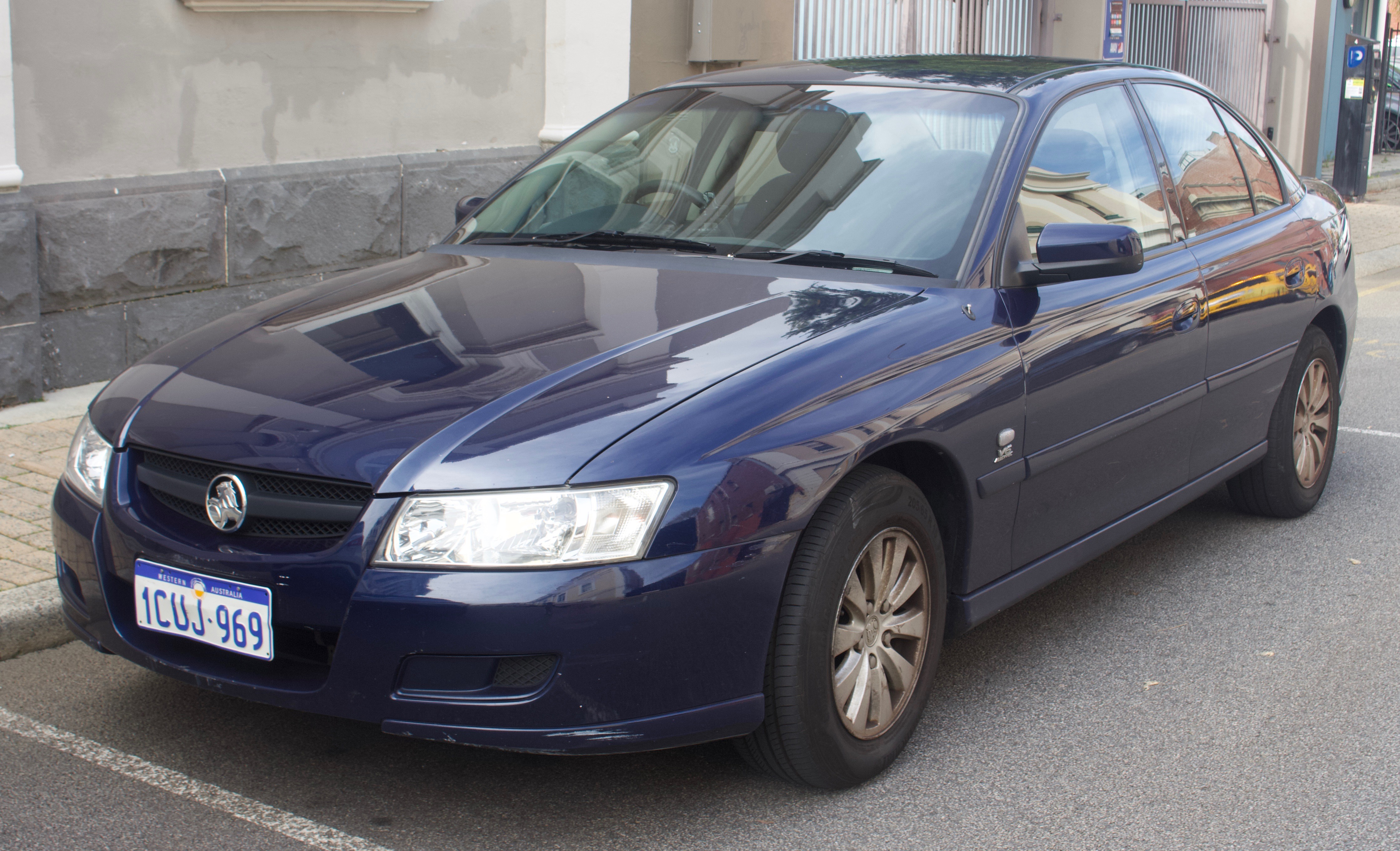

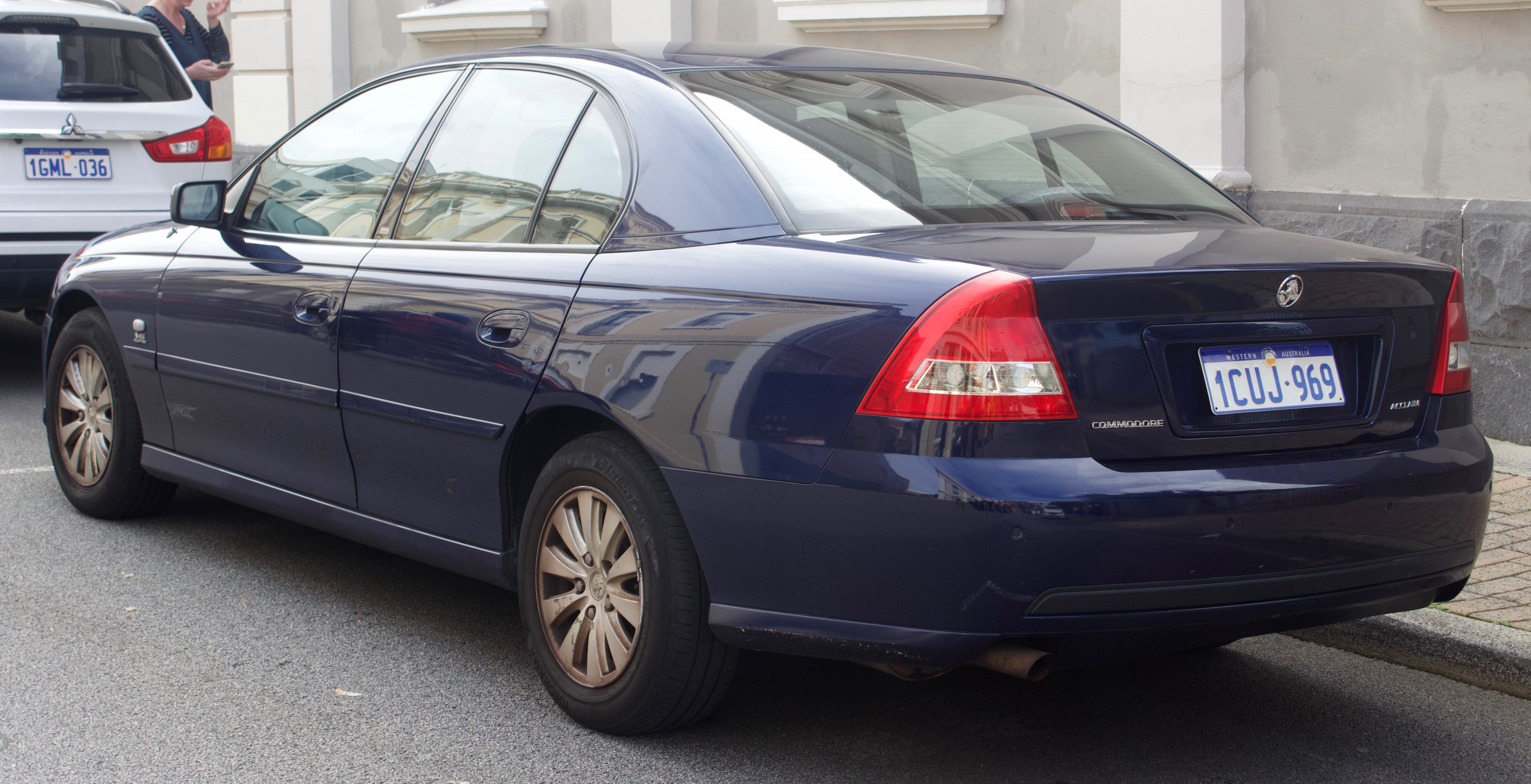
Commodore Acclaim sedan

The Acclaim sat above the Executive in the specification level hierarchy of the VZ range. The VZ series was the last one to include this nameplate, which was first introduced in 1993.

The Commodore Acclaim standard features supersede and add to those of the Commodore Executive variant:

- Air conditioning
- Electronic Brake Assist (EBA) (available on sedan only)
- Electronic Stability Program (ESP) which incorporated:
  - Traction control system (available on sedan only)
- Front and rear power windows
- Rear park assist (available on sedan only)
- Side Impact Airbags (SIAB)
- Traction control (available on station wagon only)
- 15x7 inch alloy wheels

The Commodore Acclaim optional features included:

- Alloy wheels
- FE2 sports suspension
- Satellite navigation

=== SV6 ===
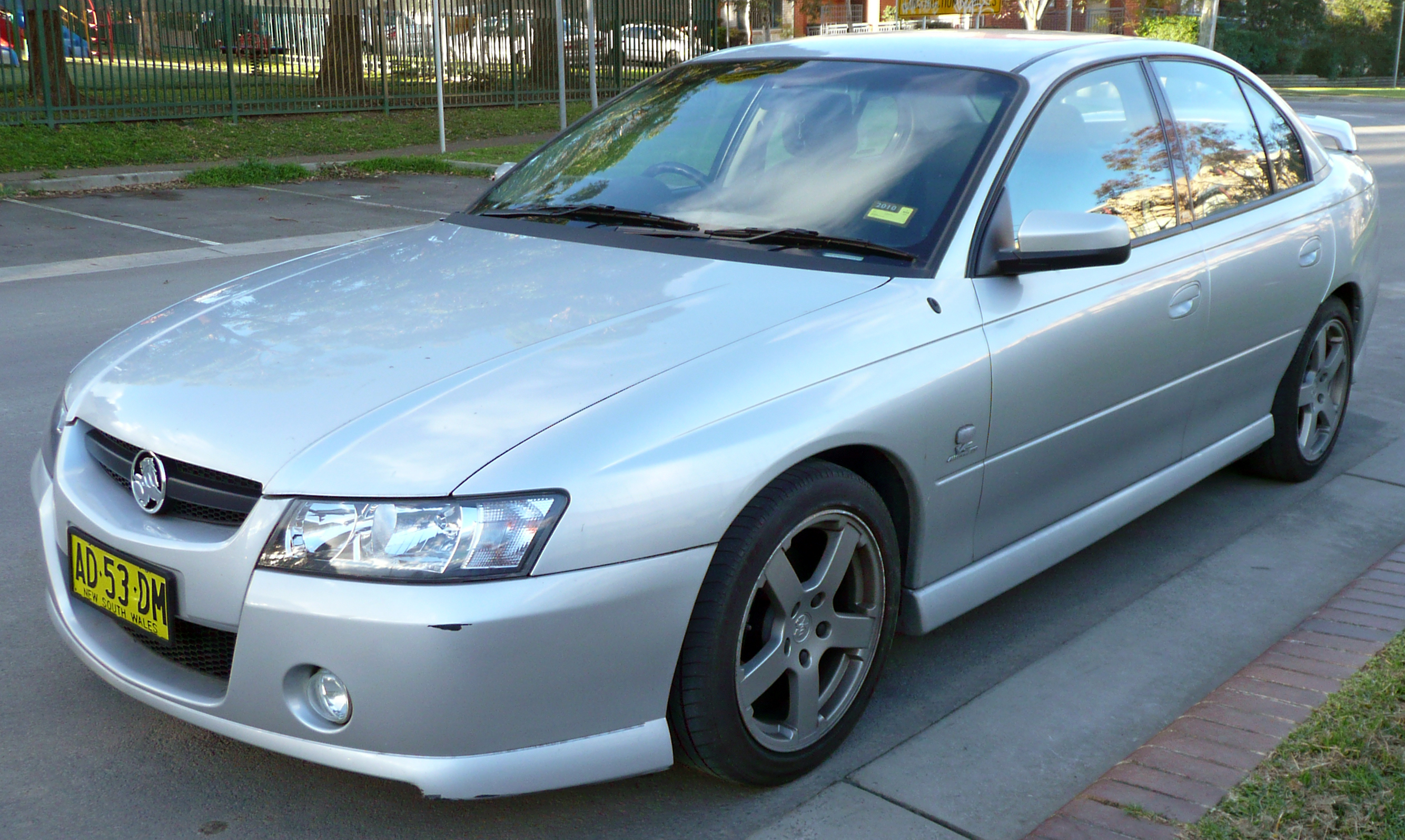

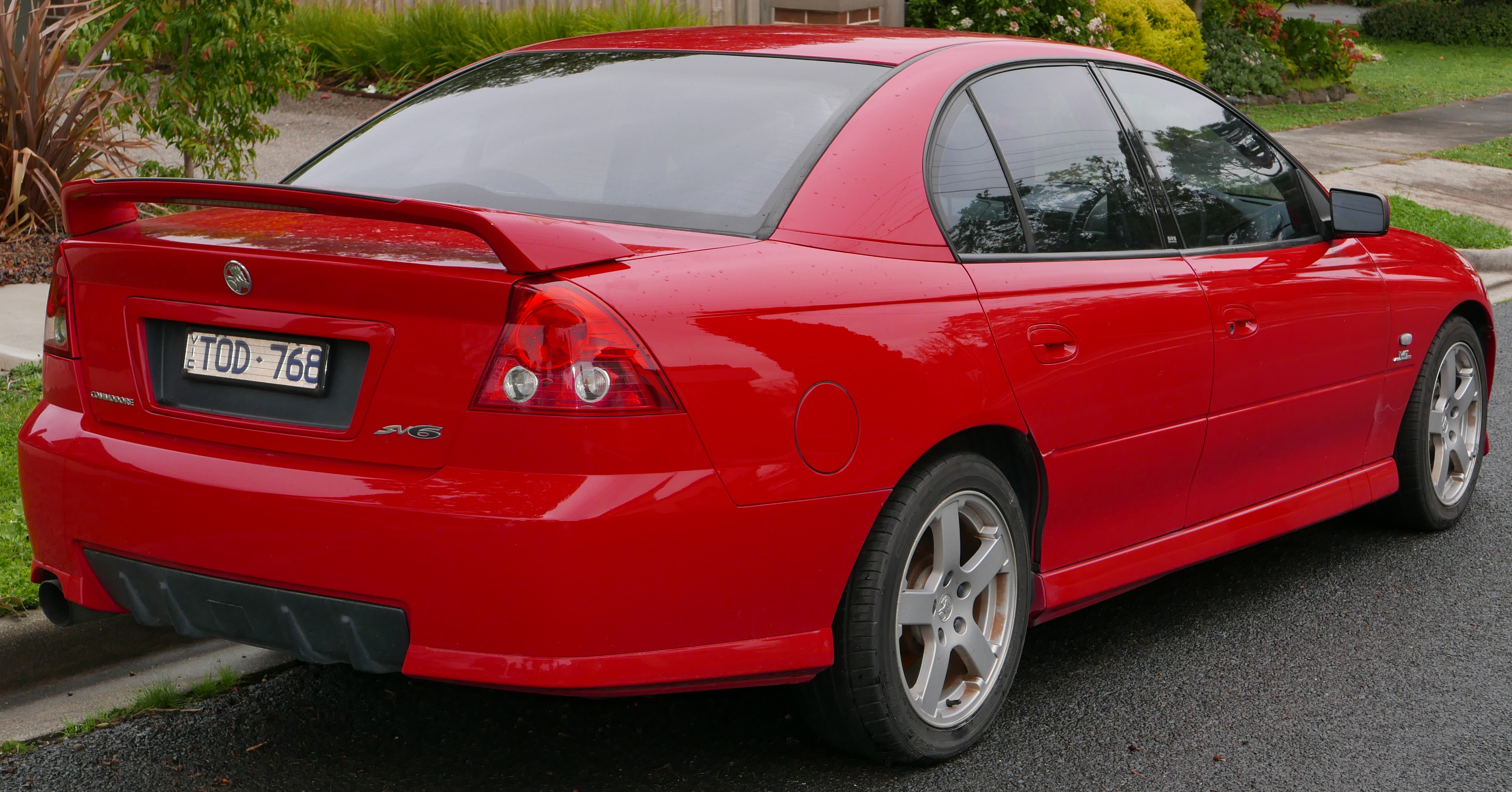
Commodore SV6 sedan

The SV6 was the baseline sports variant, replacing the S model that was last seen in the VY Commodore. Similar to the VK Commodore and VL Commodore, the VZ Commodore did not offer a manual transmission option on the Executive model. Buyers now had to choose the new SV6 as the cheapest manual variant.

The SV6 features included:

- 3.6 L 190 kW (258 PS; 255 hp) Alloytec High Output V6.
- 6-speed manual transmission (option of 5-speed automatic transmission)
- Air conditioning
- Anti-lock braking system (ABS)
- Auto headlights
- Brake assist (BA)
- CD player
- Cruise control
- Driver's and passenger's airbags (side airbags added from late 2005)
- Electronic brakeforce distribution (EBD)
- FE2 sports suspension
- Front fog lamps
- Front and rear power windows
- Independent rear suspension (IRS)
- Limited-slip differential (added from 2005)
- Leather steering wheel
- Power antenna
- Security system
- Sports body kit and rear spoiler
- Traction control system (TCS)
- Trip computer
- 17 inch alloy wheels
- Leather upholstery (optional)
- Sunroof (optional)

=== SV8 ===
The SV8 was the mid-range sports variant. Early VZ versions of the SV8 continued with the VY SV8 theme, being essentially an Executive with a V8 engine, rear spoiler, unique 17 inch alloy wheels and SV6 tail lights. This specification was later upgraded as a running change to match the equipment levels and appearance of the SV6, which remained a step down from the SS.

SV8 features included:

- 5.7 L 250 kW (340 PS; 335 hp) LS1 V8 (until 31 December 2005, then 6.0 L 260 kW (354 PS; 349 hp) L76 V8 from 1 January 2006)
- 6-speed manual transmission (option of 4-speed automatic transmission)
- Air conditioning
- Anti-lock braking system (ABS)
- Auto headlights
- Brake assist (BA)
- CD player
- Cruise control
- Driver's and passenger's airbags
- Electronic brakeforce distribution (EBD)
- FE2 sports suspension
- Front power windows
- Independent rear suspension (IRS)
- Limited-slip differential (LSD)
- Power antenna
- Security system
- Traction control system (TCS)
- Trip computer
- 17 inch alloy wheels

=== SS ===
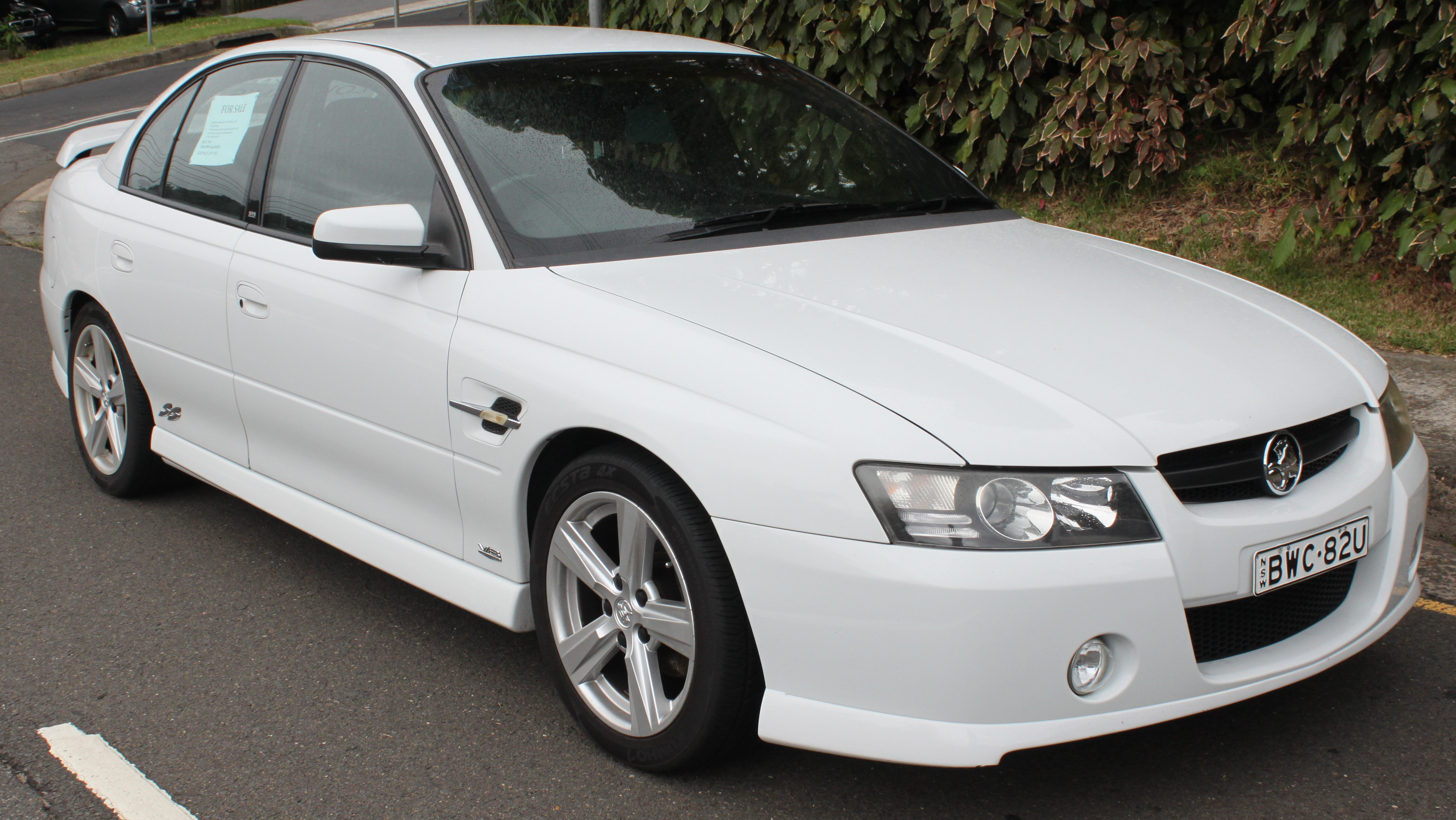

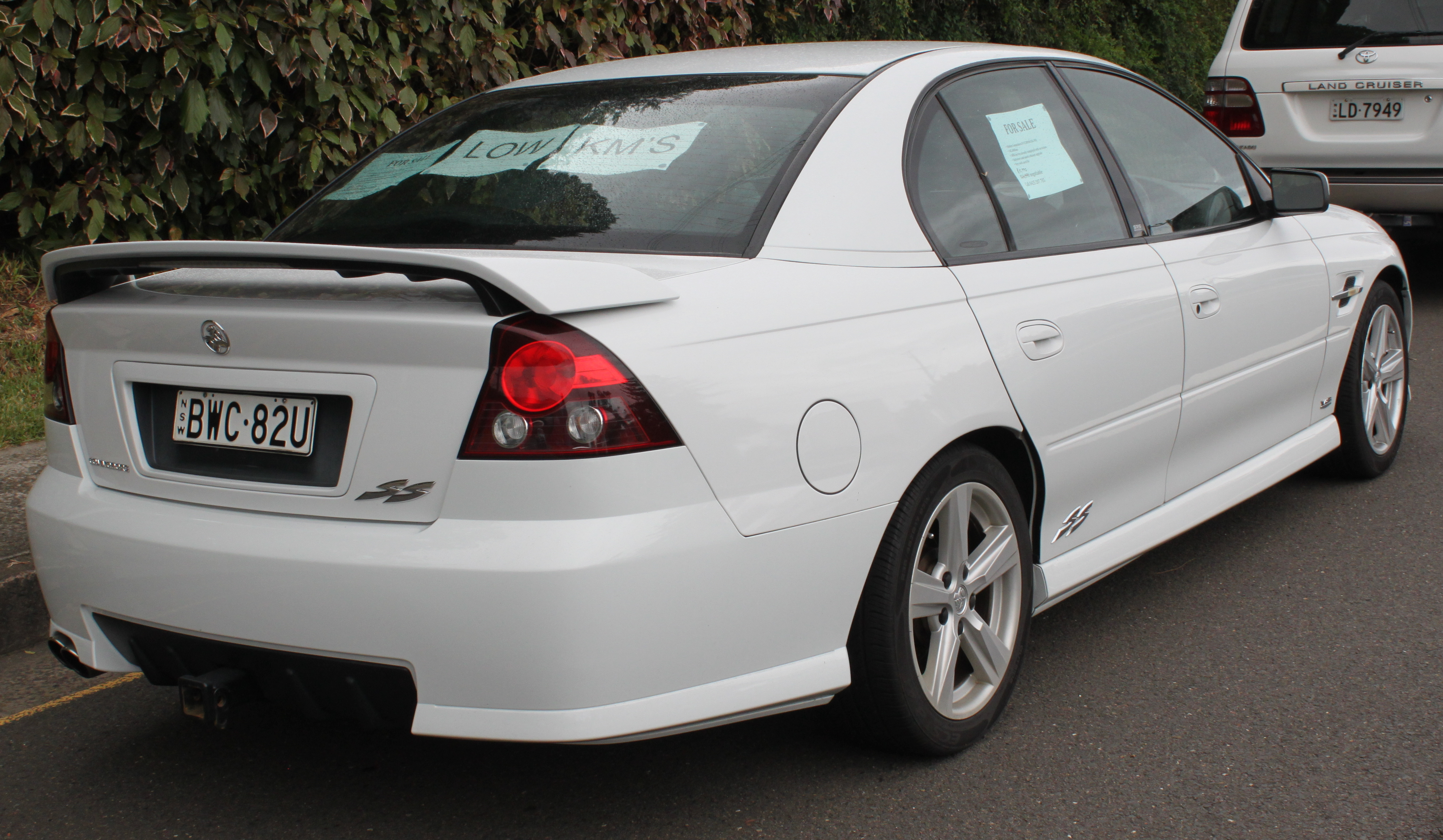
Commodore SS sedan

The SS was the flagship sports variant of the VZ range.

SS included such features as:

- 5.7 L 250 kW (340 PS; 335 hp) LS1 V8 (until 31 December 2005, then 6.0 L 260 kW (354 PS; 349 hp) L76 V8 from 1 January 2006)
- 6-speed manual transmission (option of 4-speed automatic transmission)
- 6 disc in-dash CD player
- Air conditioning
- alloy pedals
- Anti-lock braking system (ABS)
- Auto headlights
- Brake assist (BA)
- Colour-coded instrument cluster
- Cruise control
- Driver's and passenger's sports seats
- Electronic brakeforce distribution (EBD)
- FE2 sports suspension
- Front and rear power windows
- Front fog lamps
- Independent rear suspension (IRS)
- Limited-slip differential (LSD)
- Power antenna
- Security system
- Side impact airbags (SIAB)
- Sports leather steering wheel
- Traction control system (TCS)
- Trip computer
- 18 inch alloy wheels

=== Berlina ===
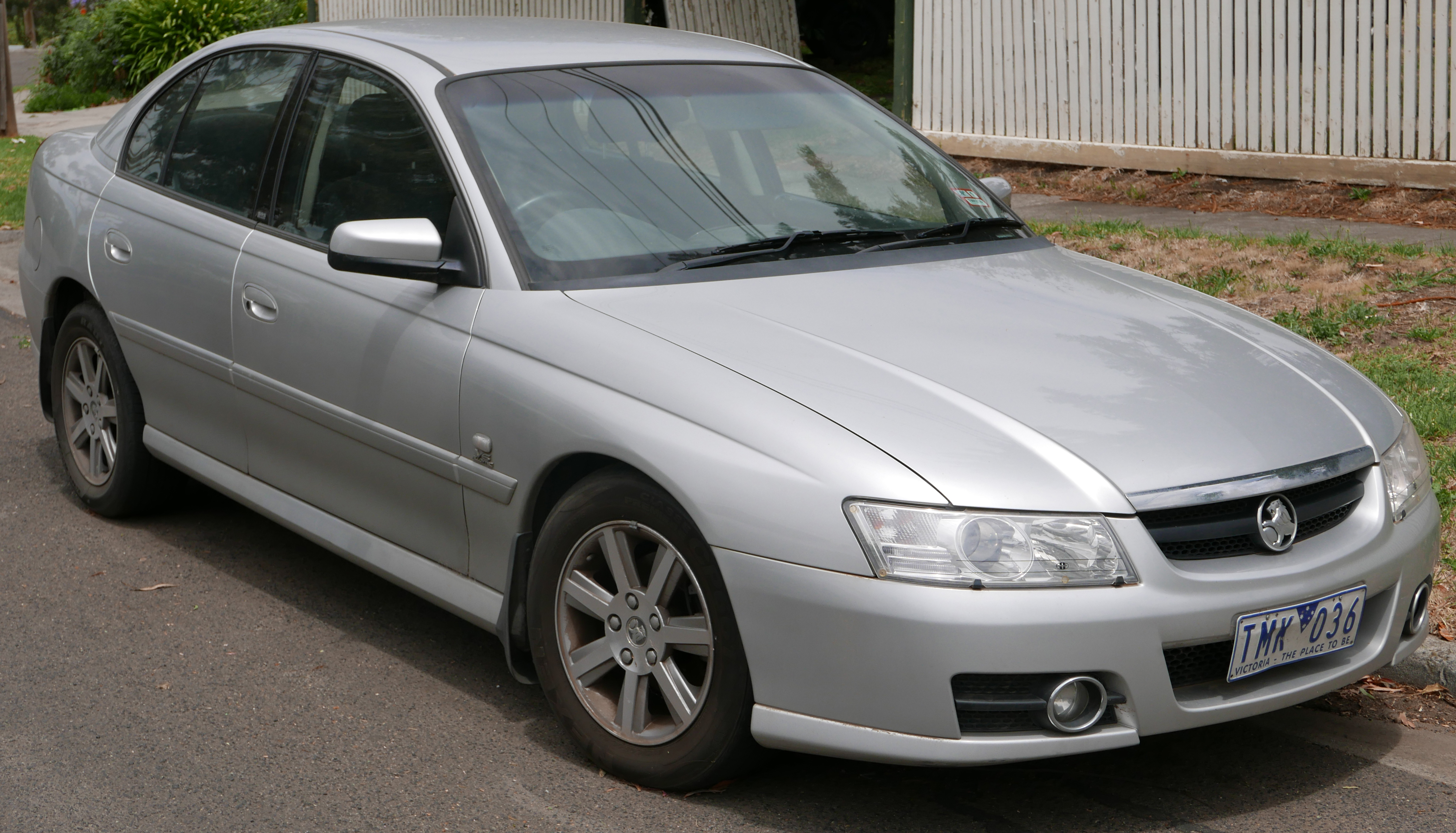

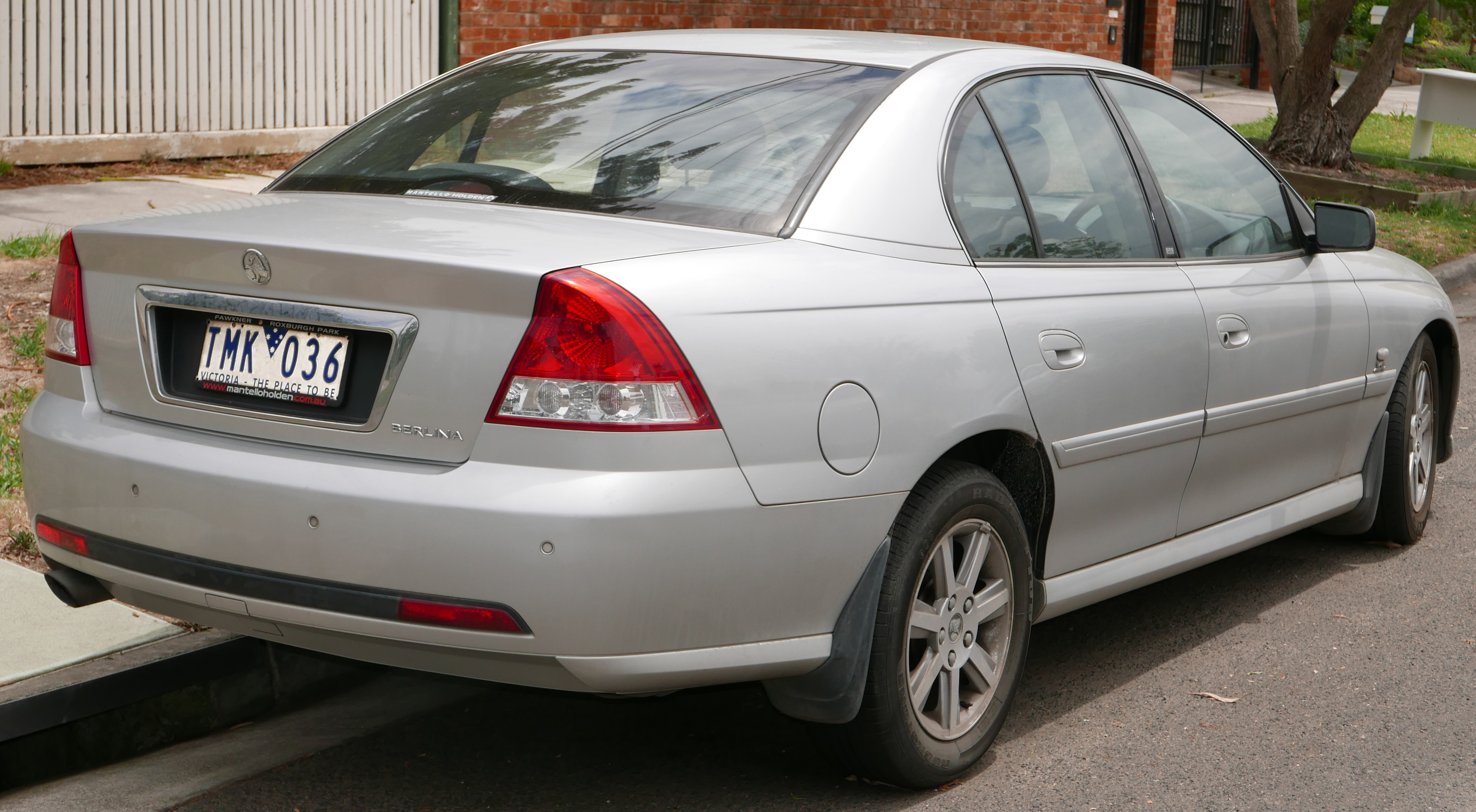
Berlina sedan

The Berlina was the semi-luxury model of the VZ range, it sat above the Acclaim and below the Calais.

The Berlina features included:

- 3.6 L 175 kW (238 PS; 235 hp) Alloytec V6 (172 kW in 2006, option of 5.7 L 235 kW (320 PS; 315 hp) LS1 V8 until 31 December 2005, then 6.0 L 260 kW (354 PS; 349 hp) L76 V8 from 1 January 2006)
- 4-speed automatic transmission
- 6-disc in-dash CD player
- Anti-lock braking system (ABS)
- Auto headlights
- Brake assist (BA)
- Climate control air conditioning
- Cruise control
- Driver's and passenger's airbags
- Electronic brake assist (EBA)
- Electronic brakeforce distribution (EBD)
- Front and rear power windows
- Independent rear suspension (IRS)
- Leather steering wheel
- Limited-slip differential (LSD) (with V8)
- Power antenna
- Security system
- Side impact airbags (SIAB)
- Rear park assist
- Traction control system (TCS)
- Trip computer
- 16x7 inch alloy wheels

=== Calais ===
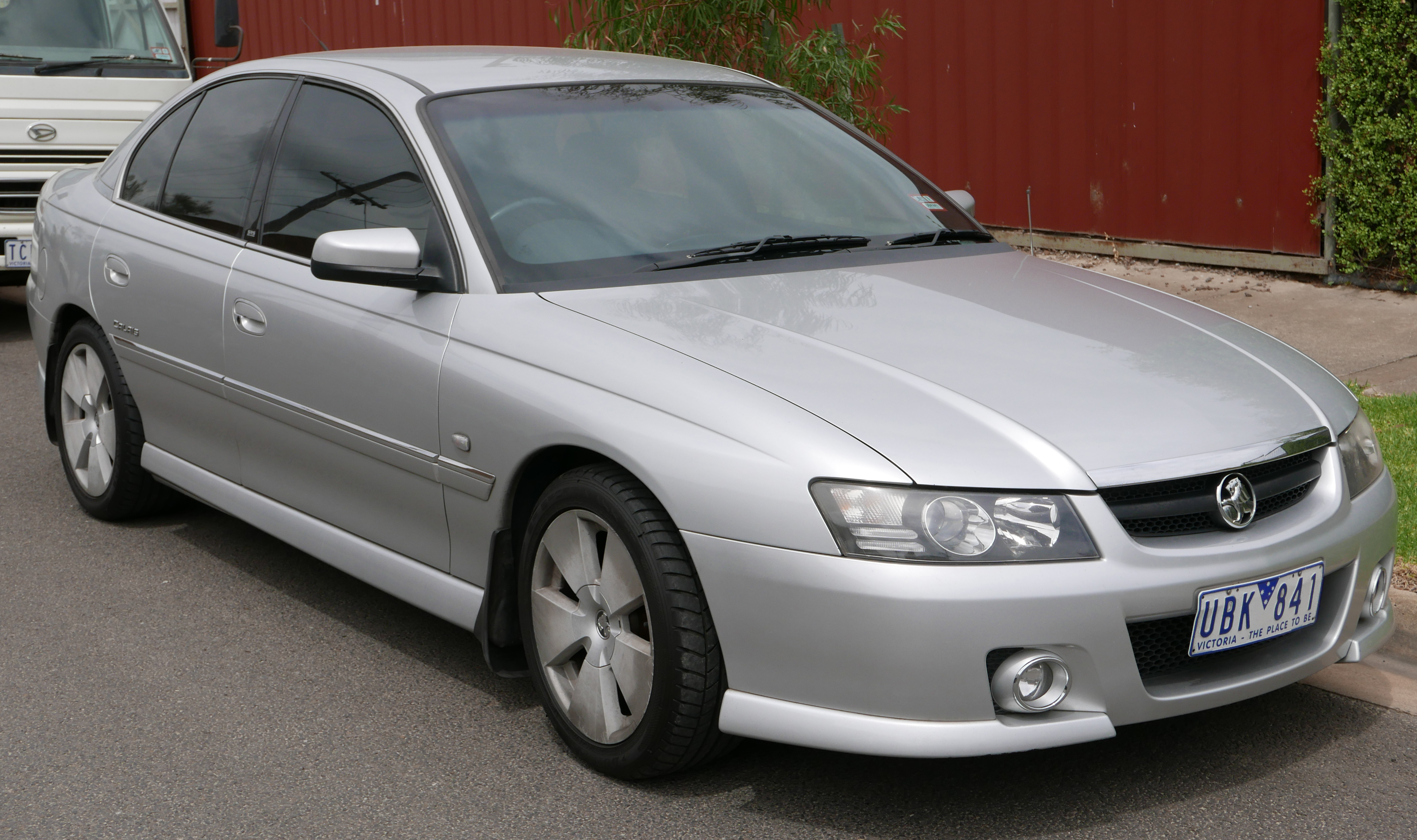

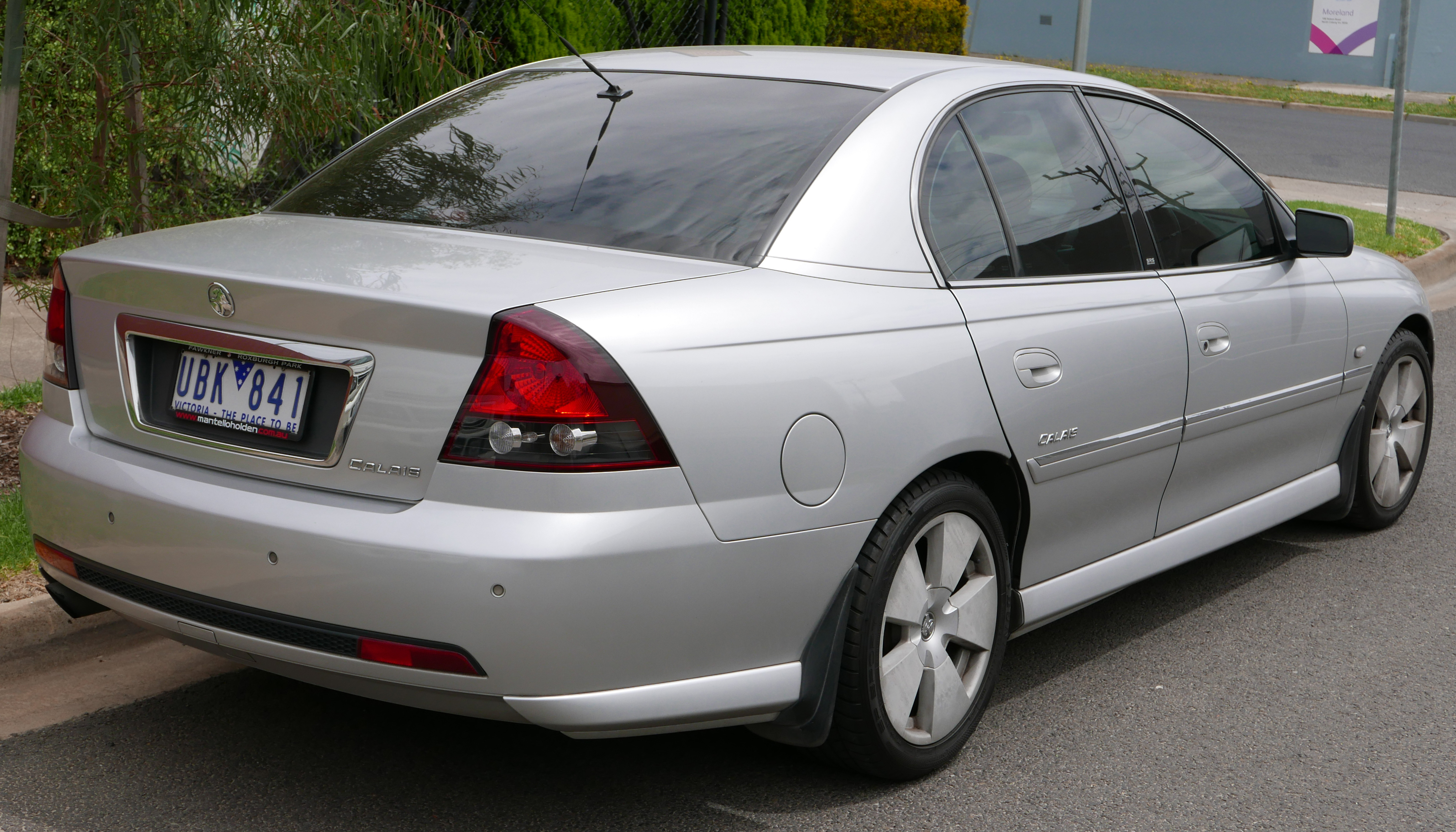
Calais sedan

Colour range (expands)
Heron White (white)
Quicksilver (silver)
Glaze (silver with blue highlights – 2005–2006)
Odyssey (grey with blue pearl highlights)
Phantom (black with silver highlights)
Redhot (red)
Shanghai (metallic light burgundy)
Devil (yellow – 2006, Utes only)
Martini (metallic olive – 2004–2006)
Barbados (light blue with turquoise highlights – 2004–2005)
Turismo (light blue-aqua – 2005–2006)
Impulse (vivid blue)
Vespers (dark royal blue)
Nickel (replacing Quicksilver – Aug 2006–2007)
Evoke (Aug 2006–2007)
Sandstorm (Aug 2006–2007)
Ignition (orange replacing Devil – Aug 2006–2007)
Provence (Aug 2006–2007)

The Calais was the top-of-the-line, luxury model in the VZ range. It sat above the Berlina and combined luxury with performance.

The Calais features included:

- 3.6 L 190 kW (258 PS; 255 hp) Alloytec V6 (option of 5.7 L 235 kW (320 PS; 315 hp) LS1 V8 until 31 December 2005, then 260 kW (349 hp) 6.0 L L76 V8 from 1 January 2006)
- 4-Speed automatic transmission (with LS1)
- 5-speed automatic transmission (all other engine variants)
- 6-disc in-dash CD player
- Anti-lock braking system (ABS)
- Auto headlights
- Brake assist (BA)
- Cruise control
- Driver's and passenger's airbags
- Dual zone electronic climate control
- Electronic brake assist (EBA)
- Electronic brakeforce distribution (EBD)
- Electronic stability program (ESP) (with V6)
- Front and rear power windows
- Independent rear suspension (IRS)
- Limited-slip differential (LSD) (with V8)
- Luxury / sports suspension
- Power antenna
- Programmable 3-position driver preference memory (seat/climate/audio/mirrors)
- Security system
- Side impact airbags (SIAB)
- Speed-sensitive variable wipers (front)
- Sports leather steering wheel
- Rear park assist
- Traction control system (TCS)
- Trip computer
- 17x8 inch alloy wheels

=== Adventra ===
The Holden Adventra (VZ) is an all-wheel drive wagon update to the original VY II series model.

An interim VZ Adventra appeared in August 2004 at the time of the release of the VZ Commodore range, but this was in essence the familiar VY body with VZ engine, running gear, ECU and a VZ compliance plate. A true VZ series facelift was introduced in February 2005 and with it, the introduction of a V6 engine as the principal power unit. Adventra was now available in a choice of four equipment levels: SX6, CX6, LX6, CX8, and LX8, with a 3.6-litre V6 engine affording 190 kW (255 hp) and a five-speed automatic transmission. The V8 engine from the VY iteration was uprated to 250 kW (335 hp), although, only available in the CX8 and the premium LX8 model. Production of the V8-powered Adventra ceased in December 2005, due only to the fact that Holden ceased manufacturing the Generation III power unit and did not see a strong enough business case to invest in the new 6.0-litre Generation IV V8 for the Adventra's all-wheel drive application.

Sales of the Adventra range never achieved Holden's expectations, especially in comparison to the rival Ford Territory, and it was ultimately phased out of production in 2006 to make way for the newly introduced Captiva, imported from GM Daewoo in South Korea.

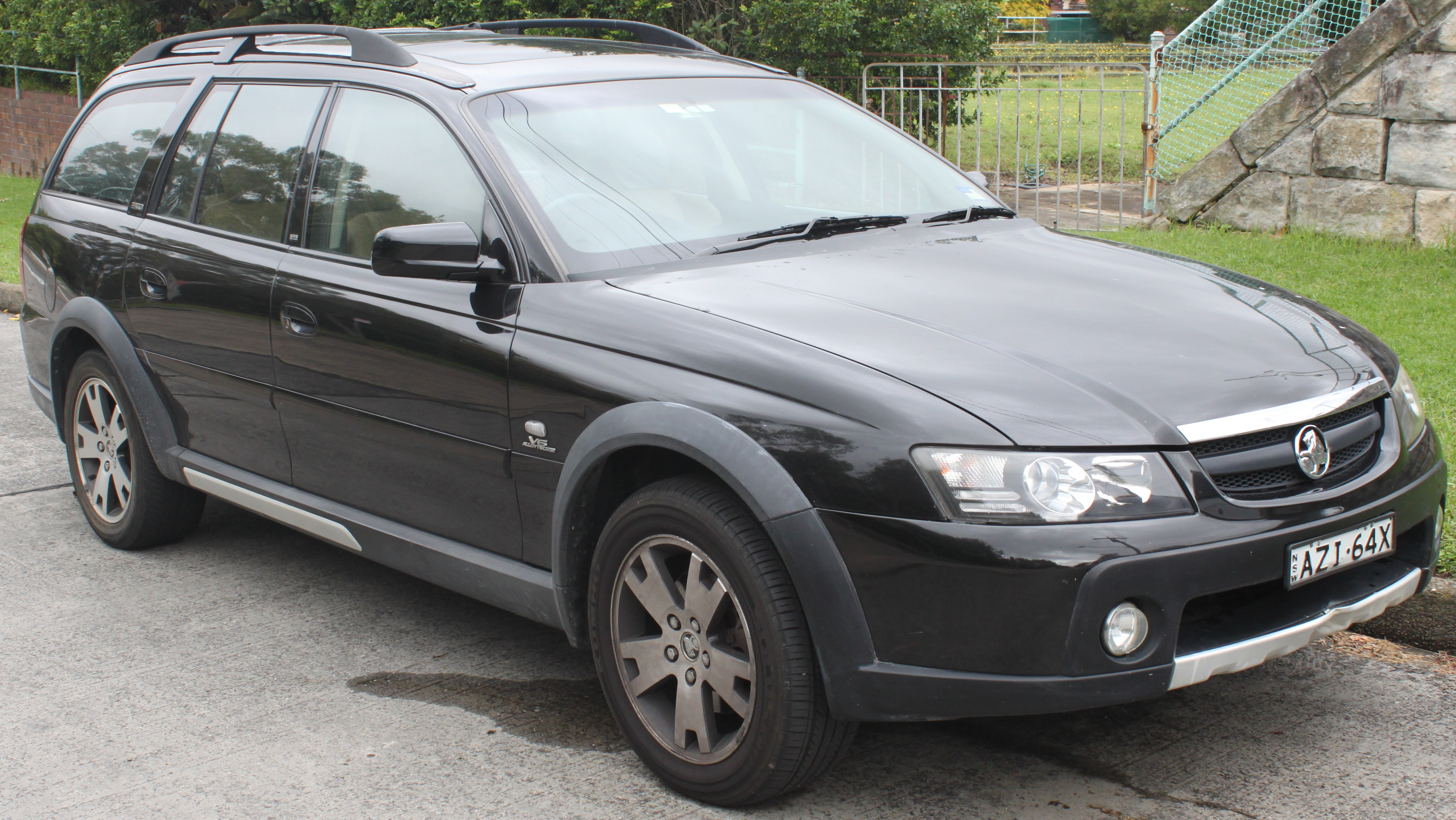
Adventra LX6

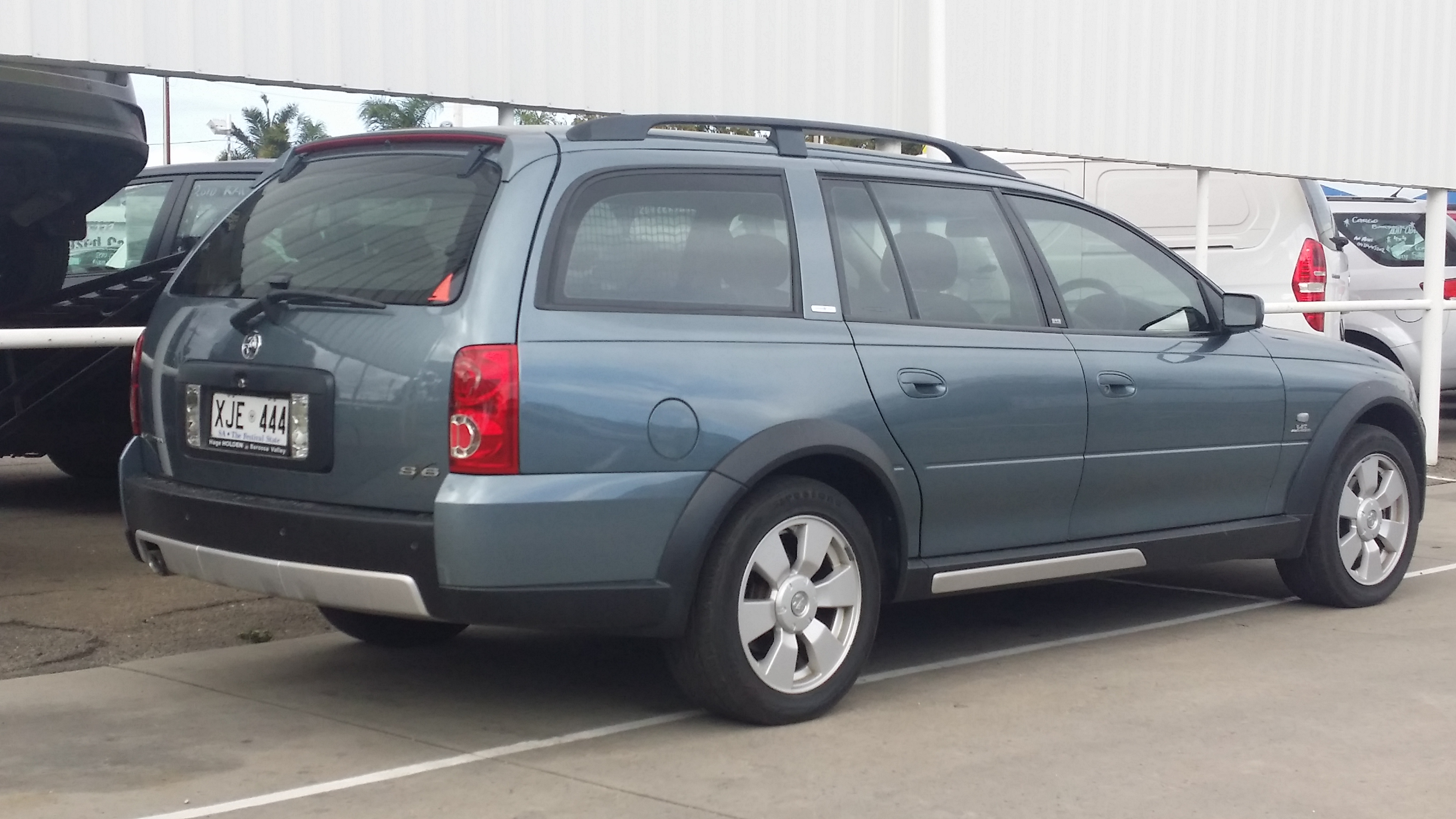
Adventra SX6

== Limited edition and other models ==
=== Commodore 9C1 ===
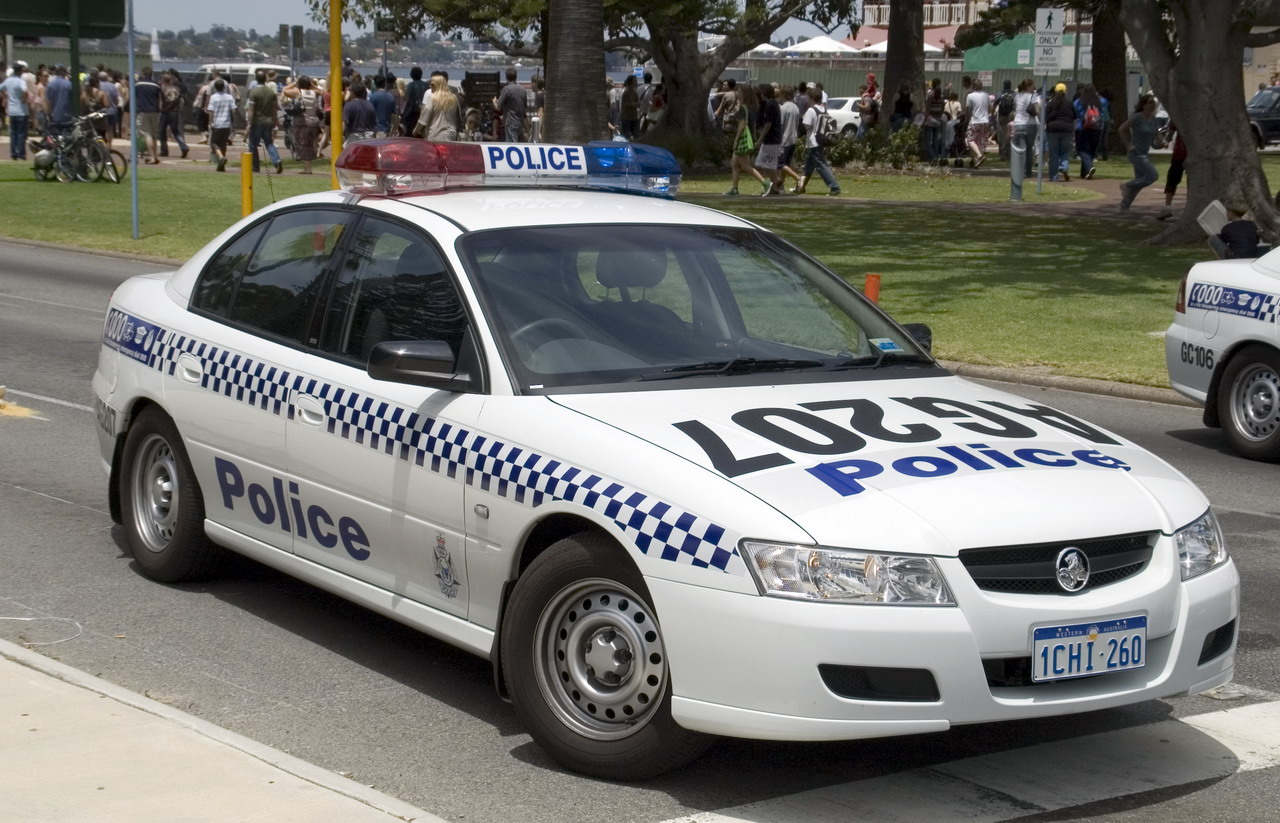
Commodore Executive (9C1) sedan

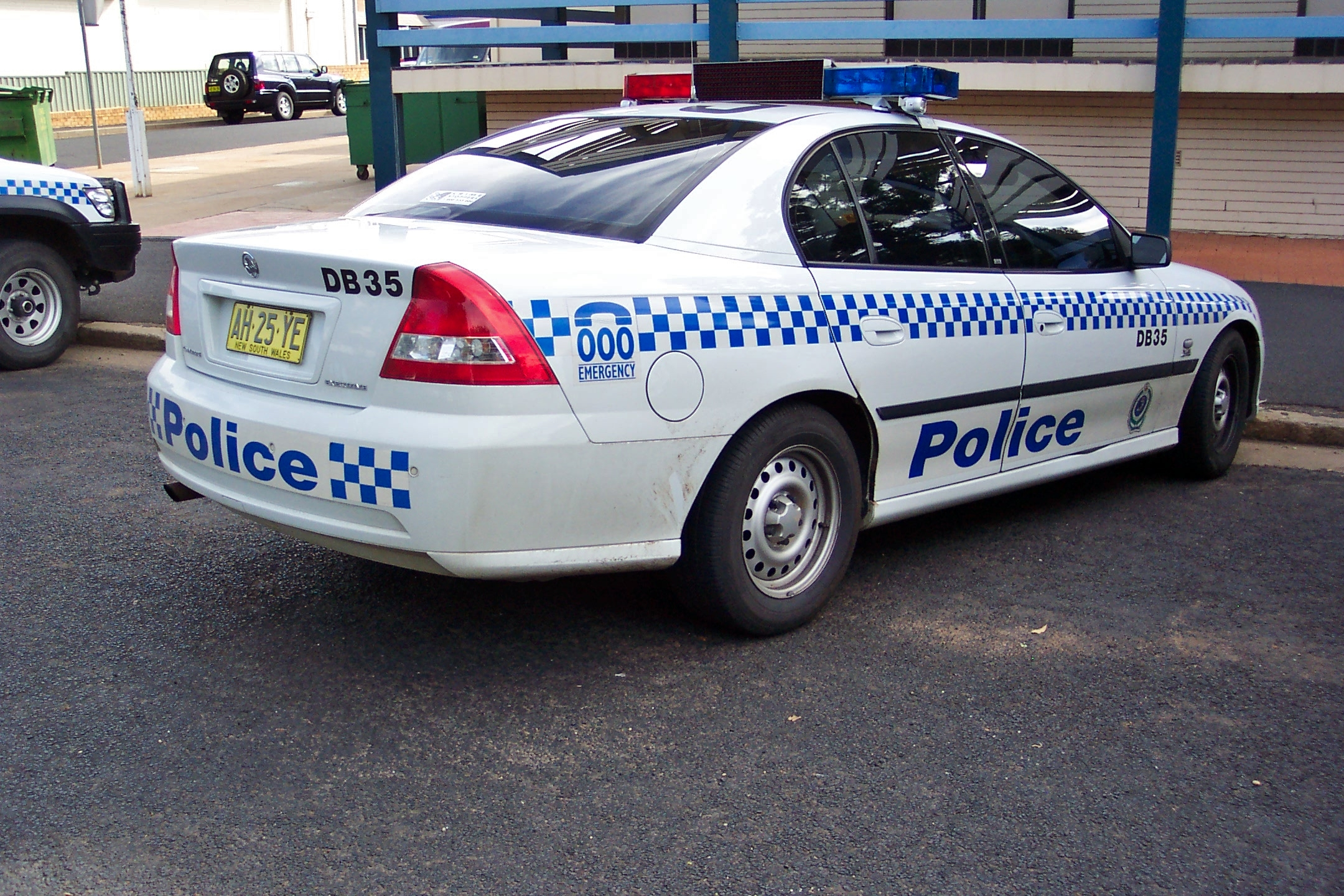
Commodore Executive (9C1) sedan

The Commodore 9C1, or 'Police Pack', was a special pack for the VZ Commodore that was available to all police organisations in Australia, New Zealand and several in the Middle East. It was based on the Commodore Executive with various added specification upgrades to cater for its specific role. Most 9C1s were delivered in white, though unmarked vehicles were offered in other colours.

Specification upgrades included:

- 4 Airbags (Driver, Passenger, Side)
- Interior light with integrated individual map lights and
- Interior light lock-out switch (Centre console mounted button, isolates glovebox light, boot and interior dome and map reading lights)
- FE2 suspension
- 15x7JJ silver painted steel rims and silver plastic centrecaps with Bridgestone 'Turanza' ER30 225/60/R15 tyres
- Black-coloured dash surrounds (standard VZ Commodore Executive had greyish coloured surrounds)
- Front and rear power windows (standard VZ Commodore Executive only had front apart from higher models)
- Limited-slip differential or Traction control
- Sump protector guard
- Larger higher capacity battery with 450 CCA and 115 min RC
- Police-certified speedometer with 2 km/h (1 mph) increments marked two horns – standard 400 Hz horn plus a more powerful 450 Hz horn
- ABS
- Upgraded front brake pads (Bendix ultimate on front, PBR akebono on rear)
- Additional wiring loom (supplying power for beacons, siren, radios etc.)
- Additional firewall access grommets for wiring

=== Commodore Lumina ===
The Commodore Lumina was launched in January 2005. It was based on the Commodore Executive. 3,700 were produced.

=== Commodore Equipe ===
April 2005 saw the launch of the Commodore Equipe, a Holden tradition for many recent models of the Commodore. Based on the VZ Acclaim. 3,500 were produced.

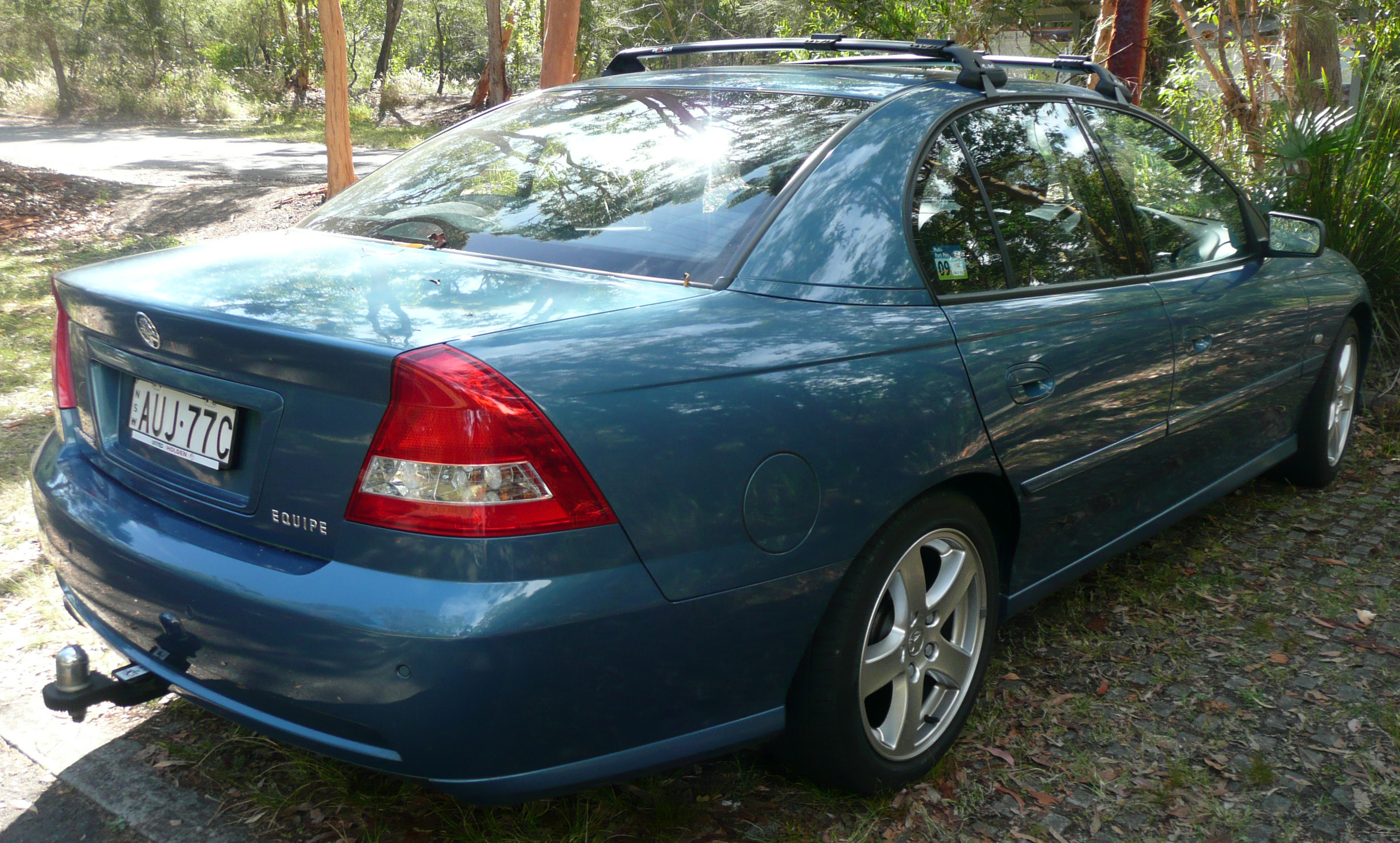
Commodore Equipe sedan

=== Commodore SVZ ===
In March 2006, Holden produced the limited edition SVZ model. This was based on the Executive sedan and wagon model.

In March 2007, this model was reintroduced as a run-out model, based on the Executive wagon and base model Ute. The SVZ ute could be ordered in Morpheous (Metallic purple with pink highlights from the VE series). The SVZ wagon included the Police 193 kW engine in place of the standard 175 kW (235 hp) engine, as well as leather upholstery and sports additions (instrument cluster, leather gearshift and steering wheel).

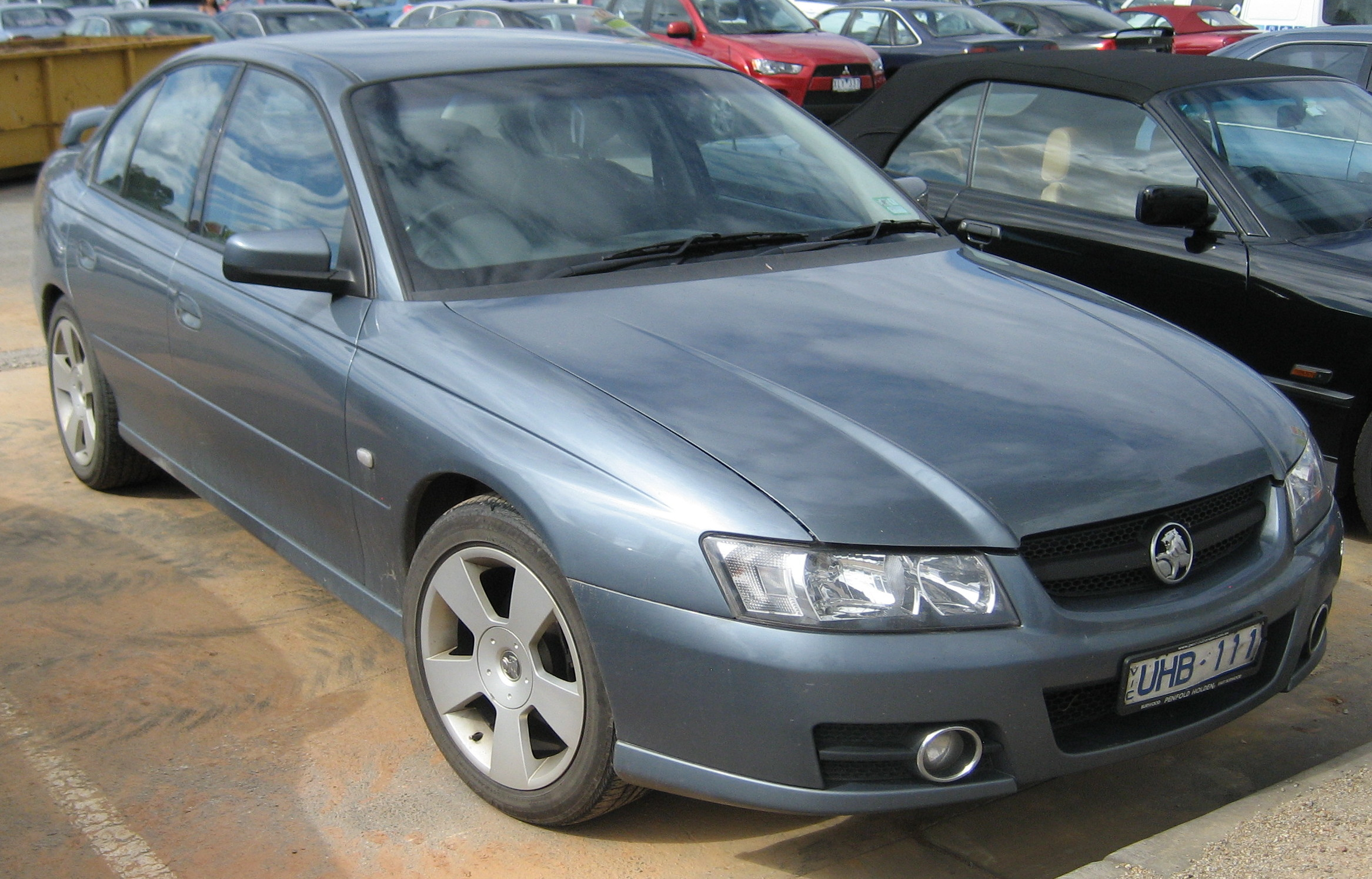
Commodore SVZ

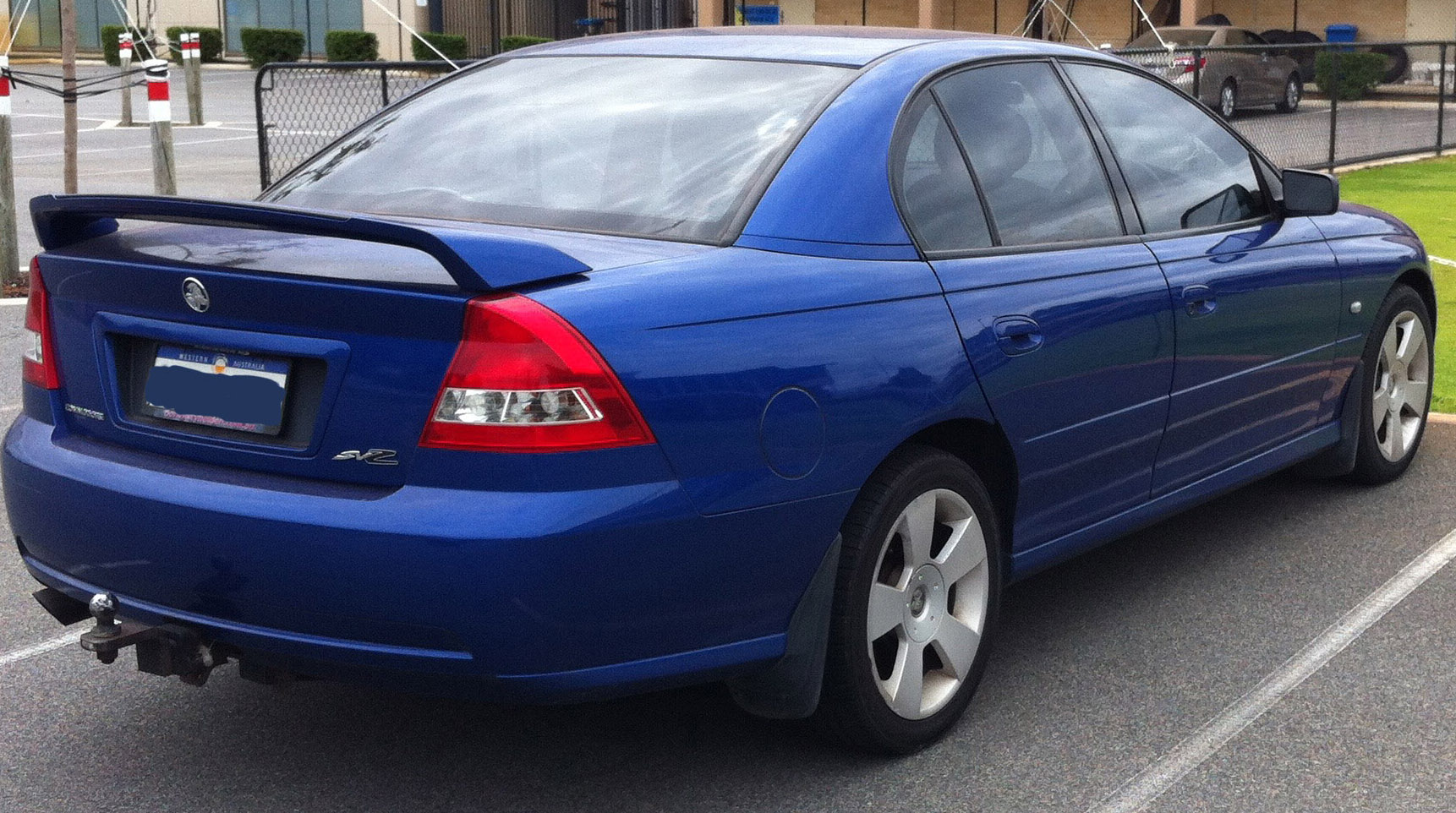
Commodore SVZ

=== Commodore SSZ ===
Late in 2005, Holden released 930 units of the limited edition Commodore SSZ. This model featured leather upholstery with SSZ logo, premium performance brakes, colour-coded SSZ instrument cluster, black centre-mounted voltage and oil pressure gauges, 18-inch Monaro-style wheels, Rear Parking Assist and Bluetooth. The SSZ was discontinued upon arrival of the VE series.

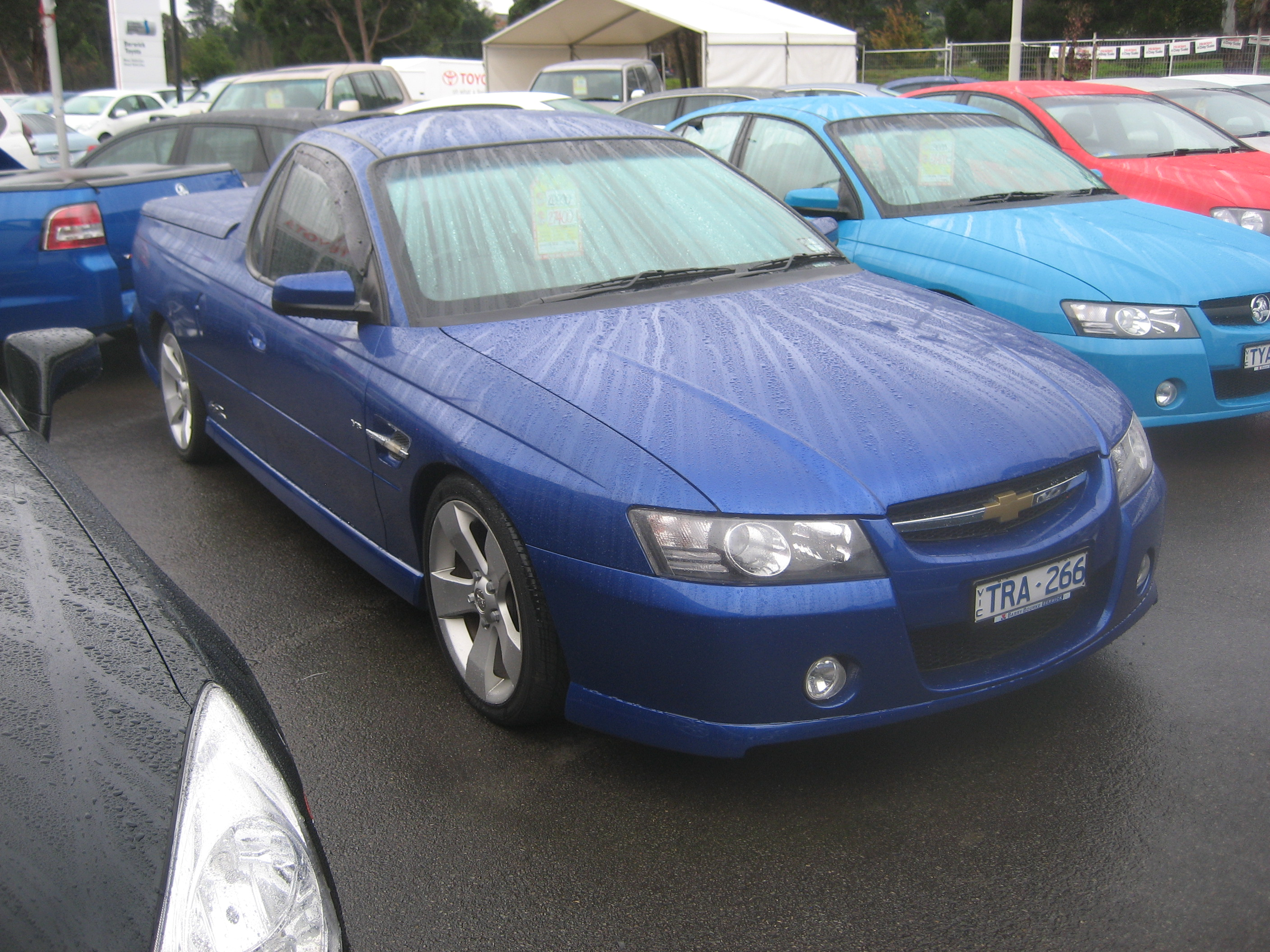
Holden Ute SSZ With Chevrolet Badge

== Commercial range ==
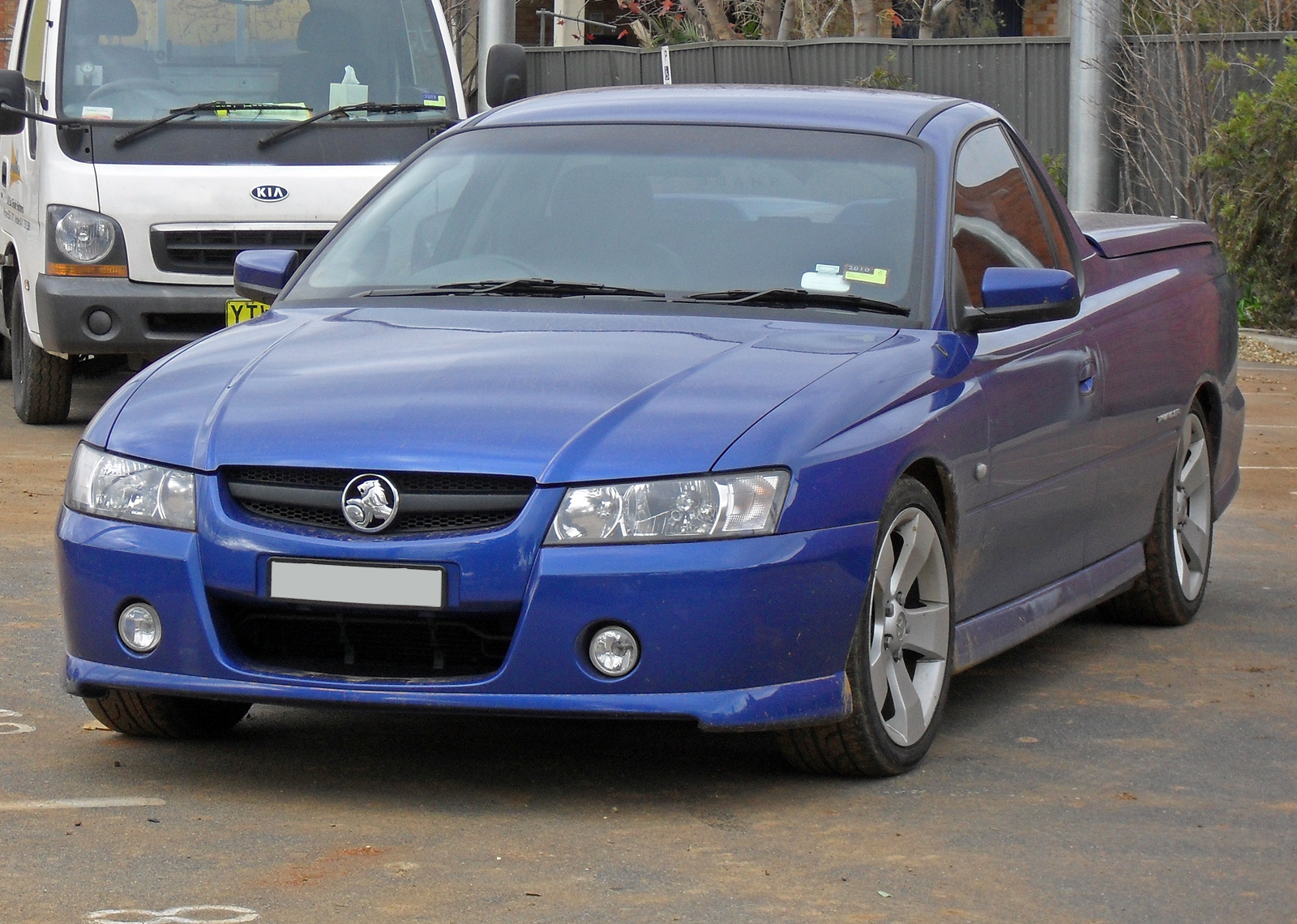
VZ Ute Thunder S

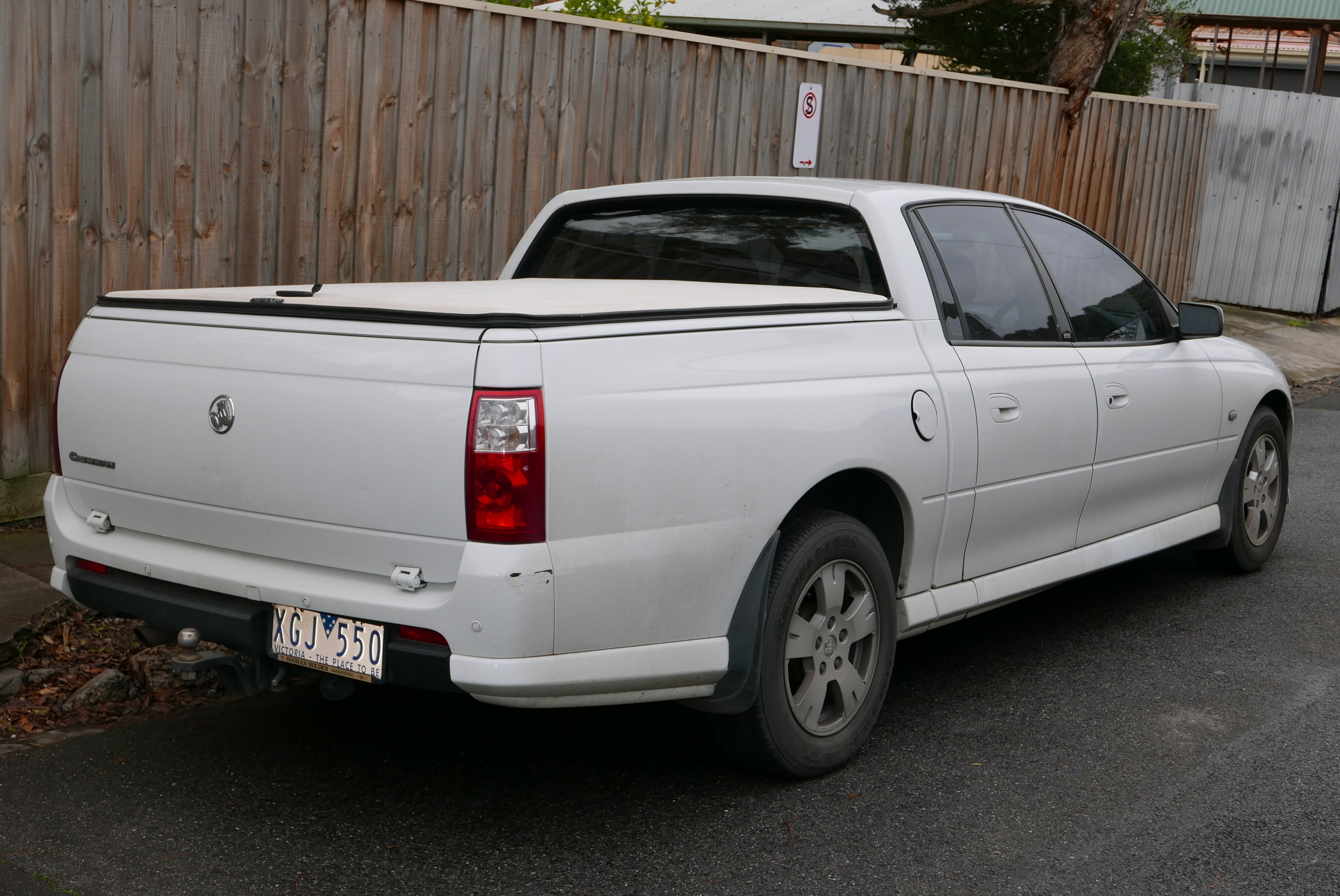
VZ Crewman S

Whilst the sedan VZ range received both versions of the Alloytec V6, the Ute and Crewman range received just the lower-capacity small 3.6L V6- Alloytec 175 – it was the standard base engine across the entire ute & Crewman range, with a six-speed manual. A 4-speed automatic was also available as an option, however. Crewman vehicles were factory speed limited to 160 km/h due to the long length of driveshaft. The Crewman also suffered a larger turning circle and heavier fuel consumption than the ute, due to the longer, heavier wheelbase chassis. The One Tonner and Crewman ranges shared the same base specification models, as shown below:

- Base model Crewman/Ute adopting the specifications of the Commodore Executive. Available with 3.6-litre 175 kW (235 hp) Alloytec V6 – six-speed manual or four-speed automatic. 175 kW at engine flywheel, and typically 119–122 kW at the rear wheels due to drivetrain losses.
- S Crewman/Ute- based on Commodore SV6 specification. Available with 3.6-litre 175 kW (235 hp) Alloytec V6 – six-speed manual or four-speed automatic

The S specification was rebranded as SV6 in August 2006, and the five-speed auto from the sedan became available, with no other changes.

The V8 SS received a power increase to 235 kW (315 hp).

Based on Commodore SS specification (minus side-impact airbags on cab-chassis). Available with a 5.7-litre 235 kW (315 hp) Gen III V8, or the new 260 kW (349 hp) 6.0-litre L98 – six-speed manual or four-speed auto.

The Crewman was also available in a higher spec Cross 8 form, whilst the VZ Crewman Cross 6 was essentially a lower powered, base model V6 version of the Cross 8.

The One Tonner was available with the following specifications:

- Base model adopting the specifications of the Commodore Executive. Available with 3.6-litre 175 kW (235 hp) Alloytec V6 – six-speed manual or four-speed automatic, or 5.7-litre 235 kW (315 hp) Gen III V8 – six-speed manual or four-speed automatic
- S: Based on Commodore SV6 specification minus fog-lights. Available with 3.6-litre 175 kW (235 hp) Alloytec V6 – six-speed manual or four-speed automatic, or 5.7-litre 235 kW (315 hp) Gen III V8 – six-speed manual or four-speed automatic
- Cross 6: AWD One-Tonner. Available with 3.6-litre 175 kW (235 hp) Alloytec V6 – four-speed automatic only
- SVZ: Based on the SV6 plus leather seats, Monaro CV8 rims. Available with 3.6-litre 175 kW (235 hp) Alloytec V6 – five-speed automatic or six-speed manual

To make room in the factory for the upcoming VE series, production of the One Tonner ceased in December 2005.

The Ute range continued without any updates for the next 18 months, until the January 2006 addition of Holden's new L76 V8 engines. The VZ Utes remained on sale well after the introduction of Holden's next-generation VE series, as did the VZ Wagons. By December of the same year, the Crewman and all AWD variants of the ute were gone from showrooms after Holden ceased production, and the One Tonner range was discontinued. VZ Utes were superseded by the VE series equivalent released in September 2007. Citing poor Crewman sales & uptake by consumers, Holden chose not to manufacture any long wheelbase "Crewman" crew cab VE ute models in the new VE series.

== HSV range (Z Series) ==
The enhanced performance VZ range sold by Holden Special Vehicles (HSV) was released in 2004 as the Z Series. Its standard range included the models listed below.

=== Clubsport ===
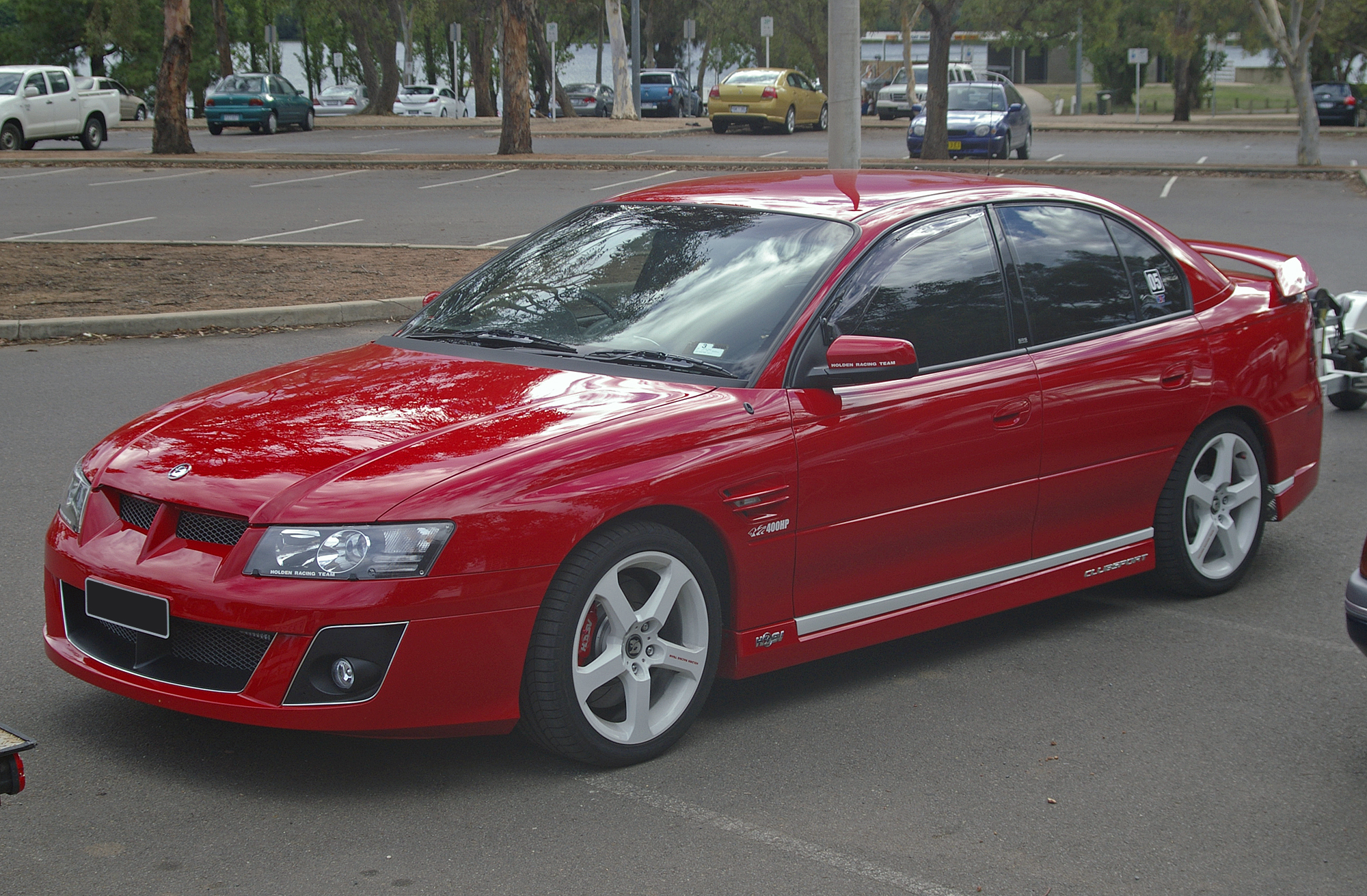
HSV Clubsport HRT Edition

The Clubsport was powered by the LS2 engine a 6.0 L, 16-valve pushrod V8 producing 297 kW (404 PS; 398 hp) at 6000 rpm and 510 N⋅m (376 lb⋅ft) at and 4400 rpm. There was the choice of either a Six-speed manual or four-speed auto. Fuel consumption was 15.9 L/100 km. A Clubsport R8 was also available, with greater equipment (e.g. leather seats and extra instrument gauges) and revised wheels design and upgraded braking system.

In July 2005, HSV also produced a manual-only Clubsport and Clubsport R8 "Dealer Team Spec" (DTS), comprising Stage 1 and optional Stage 2 packages. Stage 1 included upgraded tyre and wheel package, lighter overall weight and Stage 2 included other upgrades such as enhanced driver interface, adjustable suspension and tyre pressure monitors.

The Z Series was the first range with which HSV reached the Middle East with the one-make racing ClubSport R sedans.

=== Senator ===
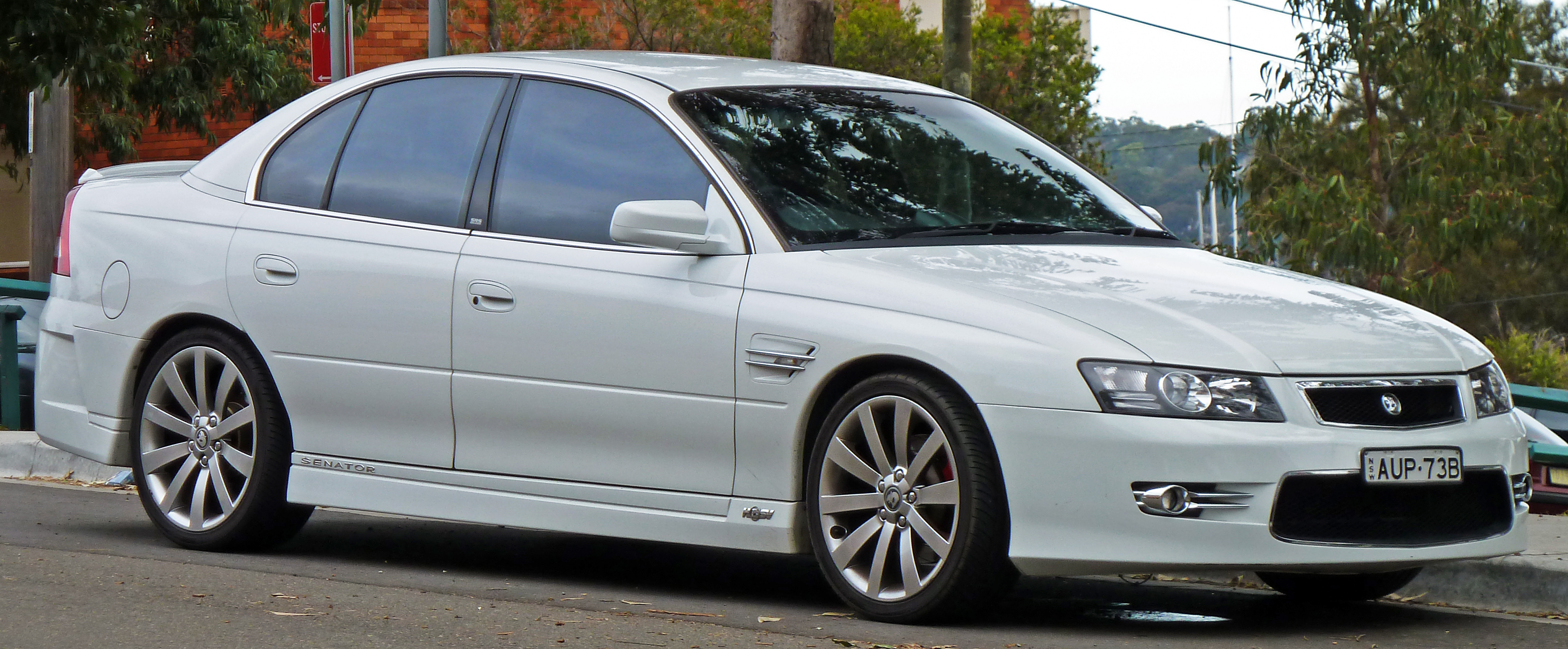

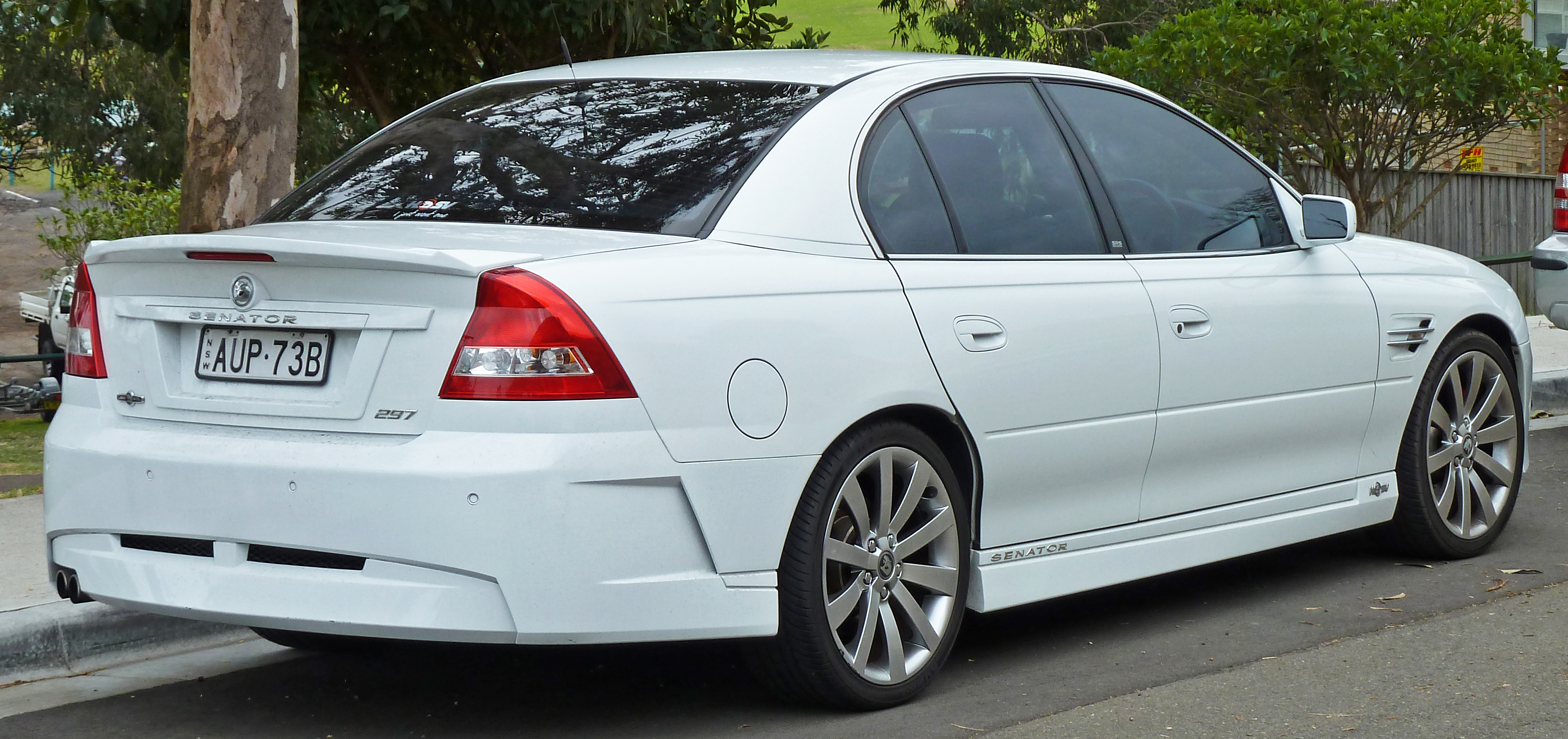
HSV Senator (Z Series)

The Z Series no longer featured the Senator Signature nameplate. The new Senator featured a more subtle styling, with 19 in (482.6 mm) wheels as standard. The engine was a new 6.0-litre LS2 V8 (as featured on the C6 Corvette) pushing out 297 kW (398 hp). Newly designed rear mufflers give the car a slightly deeper sound. The Senator's weight increased to 1,835 kg (4,045 lb), 0–100 km/h (0–62 mph) takes 6.4 seconds and has a top speed of 240 km/h (149 mph) (limited). The fuel economy was officially rated at 10–12 litres/100 km on the highway, and a jump to 18–22 litres/100 km through the cities.

Dimensions were 1,450 mm (57.1 in) height, 4,984 mm (196.2 in) length, 1,842 mm (72.5 in) width and the wheelbase is 2,788 mm (109.8 in).

Some of the main options included the sunroof, satellite navigation, rear-seat DVD players, Xenon headlights, tyre pressure monitoring system. Inside it features Nappa leather on the seats. The braking system on the Senator comes with ABS with twin-piston front callipers and grooved discs. The specially designed rear suspension has a self-levelling feature, so if the Senator was towing a trailer, instead of the weight forcing the back down and causing the front of the car to go up, the rear suspension would harden itself and therefore keeping the car levelled for headlight aim. This feature is also on the current E-series Senator Signature and has been optioned on Holden models as far back as WH Caprice in 1999.

The chrome outline on the grille was added to give the style more of a relaxed luxury appearance. The Senator has specially designed 10 spoke alloys. For the interior special suede leather come as an optional extra. The Senator Signature name has now been dropped out of the line up, in the price department it matches the Clubsport approximately. Nappa leather is standard for the Senator. The 6.0-litre Gen3 (LS2) V8 engine was similar to the C6 Corvettes engine. The brakes are upgraded and feature Bosch ABS.

=== Avalanche ===
The Avalanche was an all-wheel drive crossover SUV that was manufactured by Holden Special Vehicles (HSV) in 2005. Based on the Holden Adventra LX8 crossover wagon, the Avalanche range also incorporated a dual-cab utility model known as the HSV Avalanche XUV. The XUV derived from the Holden Crewman Cross8.

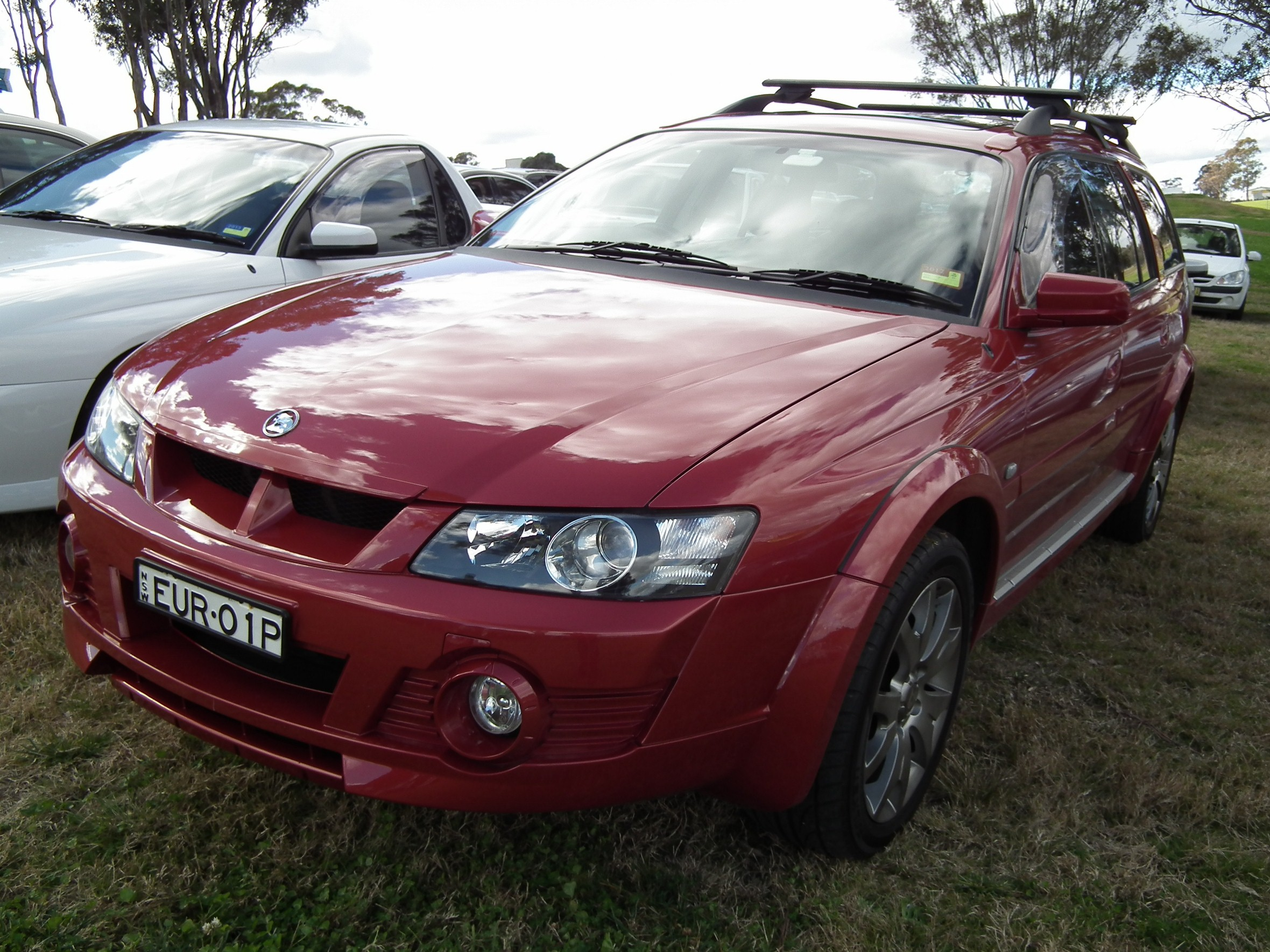
HSV Avalanche

Both HSV vehicles were built in two series, the 2003 "Y Series II" (the wagon was actually available as of October/November 2003) and an updated version of the "Y Series II", which included some of the upgrades found in the newer "Z Series" HSV models. These later models are quite rare, with a build life of nine months from April 2005 to December 2005.

As with the related Holden VY all-wheel drive vehicles, the HSV Y Series AWD vehicles as built from September 2004 to March 2005 confusingly have Z Series compliance and Vehicle Identification Numbers; this correlates to the building of new specification Holden VZ and Z Series HSV non-AWD cars during this period.

The updated Avalanches with some of the Z Series upgrades can be externally visually differentiated from the Y Series versions by their re-profiled front bumper unit that looks less aggressive and which features a more integrated appearance to the auxiliary driving lights.

The Avalanche vehicles were fitted exclusively with the 5.7-litre LS1 V8 engine rated at 270 kW (362 hp) of power and 475 N⋅m (350 lb⋅ft) of torque, mated to a four-speed 4L65-E automatic gearbox. Permanent all-wheel drive was calibrated to deliver 62 percent of the power to the rear wheels, thereby maintaining a rear wheel drive feel to the handling of these vehicles.

Along with Holden's V8 Commodore-based AWD vehicles, the HSV Avalanche series was discontinued in late 2005 due to phasing out of the 5.7-litre LS1 engines because of the Euro III emissions regulations.

=== Maloo ===
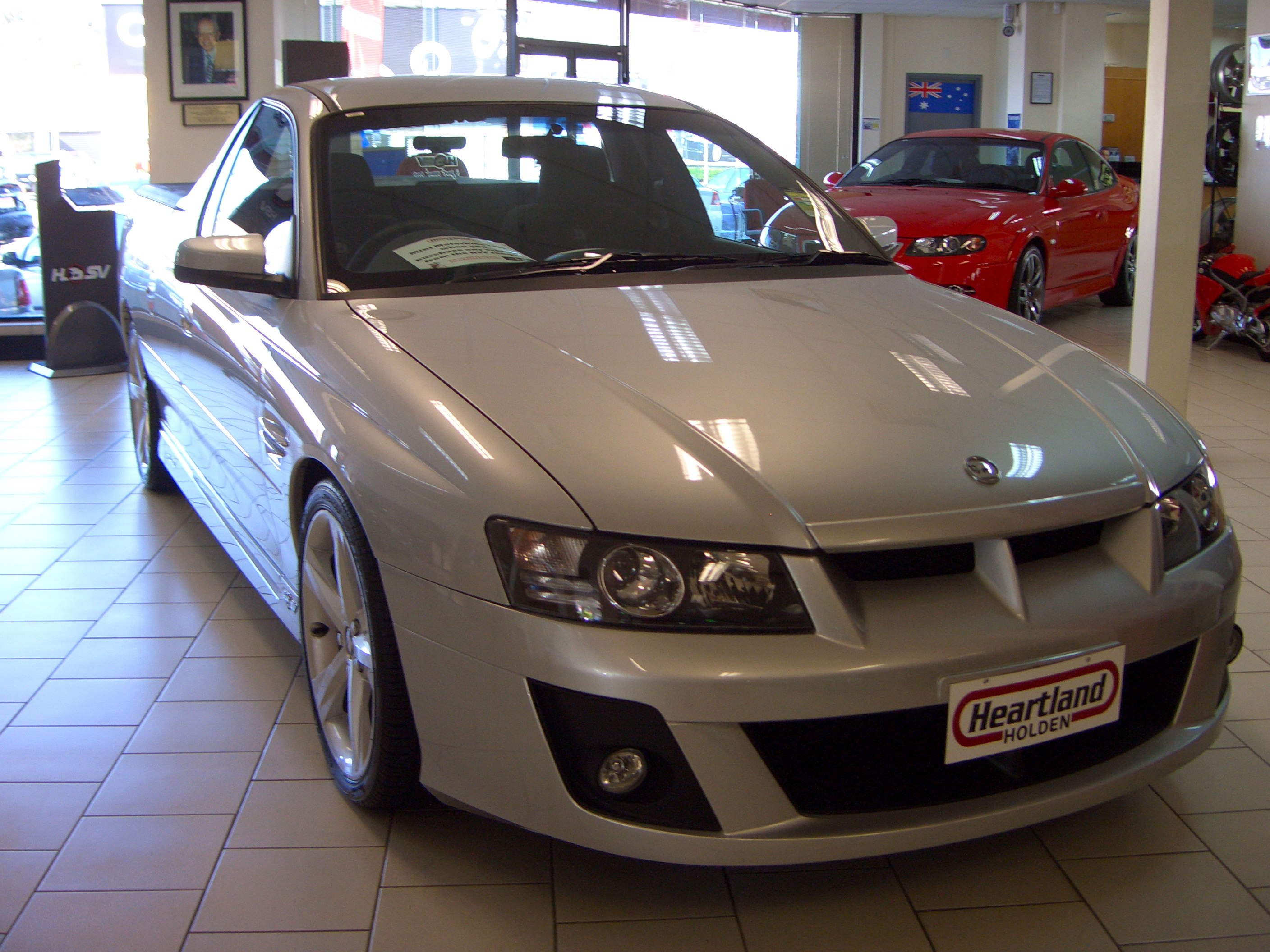
HSV Maloo (Z Series)

HSV's facelifted Z Series was introduced in October 2004 and featured a new LS2 6.0-litre V8 engine, producing 297 kW (398 hp). Along with the new engine exclusive to HSV, Z Series introduces 19" wheels, Traction Control and Multi-link rear suspension as standard equipment to the Maloo range.

In total, the Z Series built were 517 (base) and 958 (R8) and the Z Series MY06 were 181 (base) and 339 (R8).

On 25 May 2006, a standard 2006 HSV Maloo R8 driven by Mark Skaife was clocked at an averaged speed of 271.44 km/h (168.66 mph) in the Woomera, South Australia. The speed was recognised by the Guinness World Records representative, Chris Sheedy, as the Fastest Production Pickup Truck recorded. The speed improved over the previous record held by a Dodge Ram SRT-10 at 248.784 km/h (154.587 mph).

=== Limited editions ===
HSV produced the following Z Series and Z Series MY06 limited editions:

- SV6000: 50 Z series units based on the Clubsport R8, 30 of which painted in "Devil Yellow" and the remainder in "Phantom Black"; March 2005
- Maloo R8 "15th Anniversary": 50 Z series units painted in "Devil Yellow", celebrating Maloo's anniversary and marketed under the "15 Years of Thunder" slogan; August 2005
- Clubsport R8 "Toll HSV Dealer Team": 50 Z Series MY06 units painted in "Phantom Black Mica" with orange stripes and decals; July 2005
- Clubsport R8 "Holden Racing Team": 50 Z Series MY06 of units painted in "Sting Red" with white stripes and decals; March 2006
- Senator Skaife Signature: 50 Z Series MY06 units painted in "Phantom Black" with chrome shadow wheel finish, special fittings and automatic transmission only; March 2006.

== Exports ==
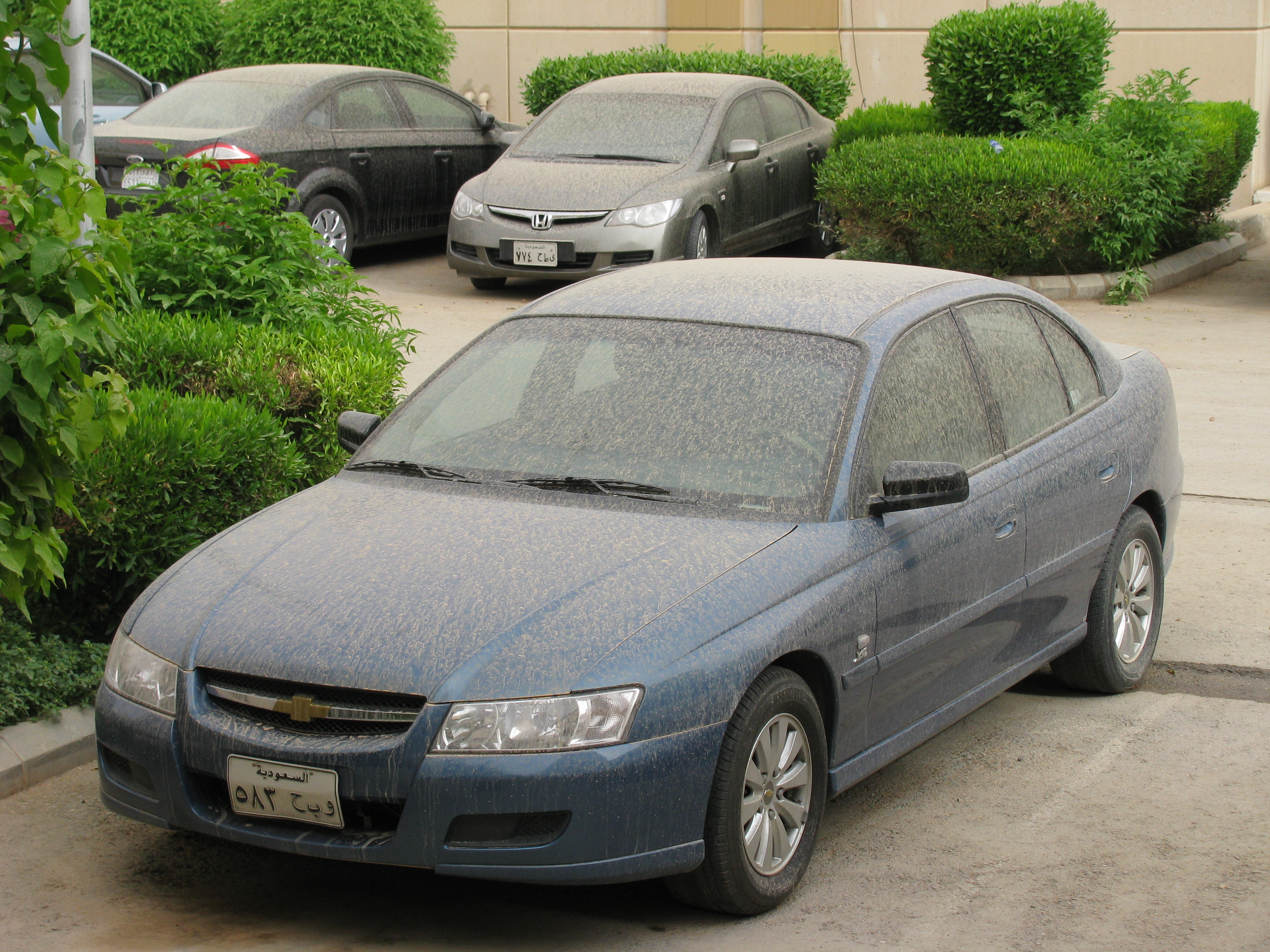
2004–2006 Chevrolet Lumina

Exports of the VZ sedan were made to the Middle East as the Chevrolet Lumina from 2004 as per the previous VY series. Trim levels were the Lumina LS (based on Commodore Executive), Lumina S (Commodore SV6 with 175 kW), Lumina LTZ (Berlina), Lumina SS (Commodore SS) and Lumina Royale (Calais).

As with the previous VY model, exports to Malaysia and Thailand continued in VZ form as the Chevrolet Lumina, sold in LTZ trim (based on the Holden Berlina). Exports ceased during 2005.

General Motors do Brasil imported the VZ as the Chevrolet Omega from 2005 to replace the VY-based Omega. This update was announced 9 March 2005. The Brazilian model sold as a single-specification CD model, based on the Holden Berlina with some additional Calais equipment. VZ Omega sales officially ended in 2007 when replaced by the VE-based model, as announced on 4 July 2007.

== Sales ==
Sales of the VZ Commodore commenced in August 2004. Whilst selling well initially, the launch of the VZ coincided with the beginning of the large car market sales decline, resulting in fewer sales than (some) of its predecessor.

	Jan	Feb	Mar	Apr	May	Jun	Jul	Aug	Sep	Oct	Nov	Dec	Total
2004	—N/a							6,030		7,869	7,301		
2005	4,225	5,890								4,906			
2006							—N/a						

Note: Figures include sales of VZ Wagons on until July 2006, but it did remain on sale until 2008.
