= 2007 Desert 400 =

(Bahrain) 2007 Desert 400
Event Information
- Round 12 of 14 in the 2007 V8 Supercar Championship Series
- Date: 1–3 November 2007
- Location: Manama, Bahrain
- Venue: Bahrain International Circuit
- Weather: Fine

Results
Race 1
| Distance | 31 laps | 120 km |
| Pole position | Mark Winterbottom; Ford Performance Racing | 1:25.6093 |
| Winner | Mark Winterbottom; Ford Performance Racing | 50:43.6752 |
Race 2
| Distance | 31 laps | 120 km |
| Winner | Mark Winterbottom; Ford Performance Racing | 45:54.1686 |
Race 3
| Distance | 31 laps | 120 km |
| Winner | Craig Lowndes; Triple Eight Race Engineering | 45:46.8279 |
Round Results
| First | Mark Winterbottom; Ford Performance Racing | 65 pts |
| Second | James Courtney; Stone Brothers Racing | 52 pts |
| Third | Steven Johnson; Dick Johnson Racing | 44 pts |

The 2007 Desert 400 was the twelfth round of the 2007 V8 Supercar Championship Series. It was held on the weekend of the 1 to 3 November at Bahrain International Circuit in Manama, Bahrain.

Mark Winterbottom enjoyed a dominant weekend by way of taking pole position and winning two out of three races to take overall round honours ahead of James Courtney and Steven Johnson. This performance came in spite of an unusual incident proceeding the race where Winterbottom's car, along with three others, nearly slid off the back of a transporter carrying them to the racetrack.

Despite incurring contact from HSV Dealer Team teammate, Rick Kelly, Garth Tander would retain his championship lead over Craig Lowndes heading into the proceeding final round.

== Race report ==
=== Qualifying ===
| Pos | No | Name | Team | Car | Qualifying times | | |
| Pos | No | Name | Team | Car | Q1 | Q2 | Q3 |
|---|---|---|---|---|---|---|---|
| 1 | 5 | (Australia) Mark Winterbottom | Ford Performance Racing | Ford Falcon (BF) | | | 1:25.6093 |
| 2 | 17 | (Australia) Steven Johnson | Dick Johnson Racing | Ford Falcon (BF) | | | 1:25.8800 |
| 3 | 9 | (Australia) Russell Ingall | Stone Brothers Racing | Ford Falcon (BF) | | | 1:26.0389 |
| 4 | 16 | (Australia) Garth Tander | HSV Dealer Team | Holden Commodore (VE) | | | 1:26.0831 |
| 5 | 4 | (Australia) James Courtney | Stone Brothers Racing | Ford Falcon (BF) | | | 1:26.0865 |
| 6 | 2 | (Australia) Mark Skaife | Holden Racing Team | Holden Commodore (VE) | | | 1:26.1382 |
| 7 | 1 | (Australia) Rick Kelly | HSV Dealer Team | Holden Commodore (VE) | | | 1:26.1862 |
| 8 | 67 | (Australia) Paul Morris | Paul Morris Motorsport | Holden Commodore (VE) | | | 1:26.5380 |
| 9 | 51 | (New Zealand) Greg Murphy | Tasman Motorsport | Holden Commodore (VE) | | | 1:26.6647 |
| 10 | 33 | (Australia) Lee Holdsworth | Garry Rogers Motorsport | Holden Commodore (VE) | | | 1:26.8315 |
| 11 | 888 | (Australia) Craig Lowndes | Triple Eight Race Engineering | Ford Falcon (BF) | | 1:26.2942 | N/A |
| 12 | 18 | (Australia) Will Davison | Dick Johnson Racing | Ford Falcon (BF) | | 1:26.3030 | N/A |
| 13 | 22 | (Australia) Todd Kelly | Holden Racing Team | Holden Commodore (VE) | | 1:26.3187 | N/A |
| 14 | 88 | (Australia) Jamie Whincup | Triple Eight Race Engineering | Ford Falcon (BF) | | 1:26.3846 | N/A |
| 15 | 10 | (Australia) Jason Bargwanna | WPS Racing | Ford Falcon (BF) | | 1:26.4144 | N/A |
| 16 | 55 | (Australia) Steve Owen | Rod Nash Racing | Holden Commodore (VZ) | | 1:26.5480 | N/A |
| 17 | 7 | (Australia) Shane Price | Perkins Engineering | Holden Commodore (VE) | | 1:26.5831 | N/A |
| 18 | 20 | (Australia) Paul Dumbrell | Paul Weel Racing | Holden Commodore (VE) | | 1:26.6283 | N/A |
| 19 | 6 | (New Zealand) Steven Richards | Ford Performance Racing | Ford Falcon (BF) | | 1:26.6331 | N/A |
| 20 | 111 | (Australia) John Bowe | Brad Jones Racing | Ford Falcon (BF) | | 1:26.6690 | N/A |
| 21 | 3 | (New Zealand) Jason Richards | Tasman Motorsport | Holden Commodore (VE) | 1:27.0816 | N/A | N/A |
| 22 | 25 | (Australia) Jason Bright | Britek Motorsport | Ford Falcon (BF) | 1:27.1056 | N/A | N/A |
| 23 | 021 | (New Zealand) Shane van Gisbergen | Team Kiwi Racing | Ford Falcon (BF) | 1:27.1110 | N/A | N/A |
| 24 | 12 | (Australia) Andrew Jones | Brad Jones Racing | Ford Falcon (BF) | 1:27.1368 | N/A | N/A |
| 25 | 39 | (Australia) Owen Kelly | Paul Morris Motorsport | Holden Commodore (VZ) | 1:27.1607 | N/A | N/A |
| 26 | 34 | (Australia) Dean Canto | Garry Rogers Motorsport | Holden Commodore (VE) | 1:27.2057 | N/A | N/A |
| 27 | 14 | (New Zealand) Simon Wills | Brad Jones Racing | Ford Falcon (BF) | 1:27.4073 | N/A | N/A |
| 28 | 8 | (Brazil) Max Wilson | WPS Racing | Ford Falcon (BF) | 1:27.4391 | N/A | N/A |
| 29 | 11 | (Australia) Jack Perkins | Perkins Engineering | Holden Commodore (VE) | 1:27.5016 | N/A | N/A |
| 30 | 26 | (Australia) Alan Gurr | Britek Motorsport | Ford Falcon (BF) | 1:27.6017 | N/A | N/A |
| 31 | 50 | (Australia) Cameron McConville | Paul Weel Racing | Holden Commodore (VE) | 1:27.8190 | N/A | N/A |

=== Race 1 ===
| Pos | No | Driver | Team | Car | Laps | Time/Retired | Grid |
|---|---|---|---|---|---|---|---|
| 1 | 5 | (Australia) Mark Winterbottom | Ford Performance Racing | Ford Falcon (BF) | 31 | | |
| 2 | 16 | (Australia) Garth Tander | HSV Dealer Team | Holden Commodore (VE) | 31 | | |
| 3 | 17 | (Australia) Steven Johnson | Dick Johnson Racing | Ford Falcon (BF) | 31 | | |
| 4 | 1 | (Australia) Rick Kelly | HSV Dealer Team | Holden Commodore (VE) | 31 | | |
| 5 | 9 | (Australia) Russell Ingall | Stone Brothers Racing | Ford Falcon (BF) | 31 | | |
| 6 | 4 | (Australia) James Courtney | Stone Brothers Racing | Ford Falcon (BF) | 31 | | |
| 7 | 2 | (Australia) Mark Skaife | Holden Racing Team | Holden Commodore (VE) | 31 | | |
| 8 | 18 | (Australia) Will Davison | Dick Johnson Racing | Ford Falcon (BF) | 31 | | |
| 9 | 10 | (Australia) Jason Bargwanna | WPS Racing | Ford Falcon (BF) | 31 | | |
| 10 | 51 | (New Zealand) Greg Murphy | Tasman Motorsport | Holden Commodore (VE) | 31 | | |
| 11 | 22 | (Australia) Todd Kelly | Holden Racing Team | Holden Commodore (VE) | 31 | | |
| 12 | 7 | (Australia) Shane Price | Perkins Engineering | Holden Commodore (VE) | 31 | | |
| 13 | 34 | (Australia) Dean Canto | Garry Rogers Motorsport | Holden Commodore (VE) | 31 | | |
| 14 | 20 | (Australia) Paul Dumbrell | Paul Weel Racing | Holden Commodore (VE) | 31 | | |
| 15 | 021 | (New Zealand) Shane van Gisbergen | Team Kiwi Racing | Ford Falcon (BF) | 31 | | |
| 16 | 3 | (New Zealand) Jason Richards | Tasman Motorsport | Holden Commodore (VE) | 31 | | |
| 17 | 11 | (Australia) Jack Perkins | Perkins Engineering | Holden Commodore (VE) | 31 | | |
| 18 | 111 | (Australia) John Bowe | Paul Cruickshank Racing | Ford Falcon (BF) | 31 | | |
| 19 | 25 | (Australia) Jason Bright | Britek Motorsport | Ford Falcon (BF) | 31 | | |
| 20 | 39 | (Australia) Steven Ellery | Paul Morris Motorsport | Holden Commodore (VZ) | 31 | | |
| 21 | 14 | (New Zealand) Simon Wills | Brad Jones Racing | Ford Falcon (BF) | 31 | | |
| 22 | 12 | (Australia) Andrew Jones | Brad Jones Racing | Ford Falcon (BF) | 31 | | |
| 23 | 8 | (Brazil) Max Wilson | WPS Racing | Ford Falcon (BF) | 31 | | |
| 24 | 26 | (Australia) Alan Gurr | Britek Motorsport | Ford Falcon (BF) | 31 | | |
| 25 | 6 | (New Zealand) Steven Richards | Ford Performance Racing | Ford Falcon (BF) | 30 | + 1 lap | |
| Ret | 33 | (Australia) Lee Holdsworth | Garry Rogers Motorsport | Holden Commodore (VE) | 16 | Retired | |
| Ret | 50 | (Australia) Cameron McConville | Paul Weel Racing | Holden Commodore (VE) | 16 | Retired | |
| Ret | 88 | (Australia) Jamie Whincup | Triple Eight Race Engineering | Ford Falcon (BF) | 13 | Retired | |
| Ret | 55 | (Australia) Steve Owen | Rod Nash Racing | Holden Commodore (VZ) | 6 | Retired | |
| Ret | 888 | (Australia) Craig Lowndes | Triple Eight Race Engineering | Ford Falcon (BF) | 0 | Accident | |
| Ret | 67 | (Australia) Paul Morris | Paul Morris Motorsport | Holden Commodore (VE) | 0 | Accident | |
Fastest Lap: Mark Winterbottom (Ford Performance Racing) - 1:25.2817 on lap 6

=== Race 2 ===
| Pos | No | Driver | Team | Car | Laps | Time/Retired | Grid |
|---|---|---|---|---|---|---|---|
| 1 | 5 | (Australia) Mark Winterbottom | Ford Performance Racing | Ford Falcon (BF) | 31 | | |
| 2 | 4 | (Australia) James Courtney | Stone Brothers Racing | Ford Falcon (BF) | 31 | | |
| 3 | 18 | (Australia) Will Davison | Dick Johnson Racing | Ford Falcon (BF) | 31 | | |
| 4 | 17 | (Australia) Steven Johnson | Dick Johnson Racing | Ford Falcon (BF) | 31 | | |
| 5 | 888 | (Australia) Craig Lowndes | Triple Eight Race Engineering | Ford Falcon (BF) | 31 | | |
| 6 | 6 | (New Zealand) Steven Richards | Ford Performance Racing | Ford Falcon (BF) | 31 | | |
| 7 | 34 | (Australia) Dean Canto | Garry Rogers Motorsport | Holden Commodore (VE) | 31 | | |
| 8 | 9 | (Australia) Russell Ingall | Stone Brothers Racing | Ford Falcon (BF) | 31 | | |
| 9 | 7 | (Australia) Shane Price | Perkins Engineering | Holden Commodore (VE) | 31 | | |
| 10 | 10 | (Australia) Jason Bargwanna | WPS Racing | Ford Falcon (BF) | 31 | | |
| 11 | 51 | (New Zealand) Greg Murphy | Tasman Motorsport | Holden Commodore (VE) | 31 | | |
| 12 | 1 | (Australia) Rick Kelly | HSV Dealer Team | Holden Commodore (VE) | 31 | | |
| 13 | 3 | (New Zealand) Jason Richards | Tasman Motorsport | Holden Commodore (VE) | 31 | | |
| 14 | 16 | (Australia) Garth Tander | HSV Dealer Team | Holden Commodore (VE) | 31 | | |
| 15 | 14 | (New Zealand) Simon Wills | Brad Jones Racing | Ford Falcon (BF) | 31 | | |
| 16 | 021 | (New Zealand) Shane van Gisbergen | Team Kiwi Racing | Ford Falcon (BF) | 31 | | |
| 17 | 11 | (Australia) Jack Perkins | Perkins Engineering | Holden Commodore (VE) | 31 | | |
| 18 | 2 | (Australia) Mark Skaife | Holden Racing Team | Holden Commodore (VE) | 31 | | |
| 19 | 39 | (Australia) Steven Ellery | Paul Morris Motorsport | Holden Commodore (VZ) | 31 | | |
| 20 | 50 | (Australia) Cameron McConville | Paul Weel Racing | Holden Commodore (VE) | 31 | | |
| 21 | 12 | (Australia) Andrew Jones | Brad Jones Racing | Ford Falcon (BF) | 31 | | |
| 22 | 88 | (Australia) Jamie Whincup | Triple Eight Race Engineering | Ford Falcon (BF) | 31 | | |
| 23 | 67 | (Australia) Paul Morris | Paul Morris Motorsport | Holden Commodore (VE) | 31 | | |
| 24 | 111 | (Australia) John Bowe | Paul Cruickshank Racing | Ford Falcon (BF) | 30 | + 1 lap | |
| 25 | 33 | (Australia) Lee Holdsworth | Garry Rogers Motorsport | Holden Commodore (VE) | 30 | + 1 lap | |
| 26 | 8 | (Brazil) Max Wilson | WPS Racing | Ford Falcon (BF) | 29 | + 2 laps | |
| 27 | 55 | (Australia) Steve Owen | Rod Nash Racing | Holden Commodore (VZ) | 29 | + 2 laps | |
| 28 | 22 | (Australia) Todd Kelly | Holden Racing Team | Holden Commodore (VE) | 29 | + 2 laps | |
| Ret | 26 | (Australia) Alan Gurr | Britek Motorsport | Ford Falcon (BF) | 20 | Retired | |
| Ret | 20 | (Australia) Paul Dumbrell | Paul Weel Racing | Holden Commodore (VE) | 3 | Retired | |
| Ret | 25 | (Australia) Jason Bright | Britek Motorsport | Ford Falcon (BF) | 1 | Retired | |
Fastest Lap: Mark Winterbottom (Ford Performance Racing) - 1:25.7318 on lap 2

=== Race 3 ===
| Pos | No | Driver | Team | Car | Laps | Time/Retired | Grid |
|---|---|---|---|---|---|---|---|
| 1 | 888 | (Australia) Craig Lowndes | Triple Eight Race Engineering | Ford Falcon (BF) | 31 | | |
| 2 | 4 | (Australia) James Courtney | Stone Brothers Racing | Ford Falcon (BF) | 31 | | |
| 3 | 5 | (Australia) Mark Winterbottom | Ford Performance Racing | Ford Falcon (BF) | 31 | | |
| 4 | 16 | (Australia) Garth Tander | HSV Dealer Team | Holden Commodore (VE) | 31 | | |
| 5 | 18 | (Australia) Will Davison | Dick Johnson Racing | Ford Falcon (BF) | 31 | | |
| 6 | 17 | (Australia) Steven Johnson | Dick Johnson Racing | Ford Falcon (BF) | 31 | | |
| 7 | 9 | (Australia) Russell Ingall | Stone Brothers Racing | Ford Falcon (BF) | 31 | | |
| 8 | 1 | (Australia) Rick Kelly | HSV Dealer Team | Holden Commodore (VE) | 31 | | |
| 9 | 34 | (Australia) Dean Canto | Garry Rogers Motorsport | Holden Commodore (VE) | 31 | | |
| 10 | 51 | (New Zealand) Greg Murphy | Tasman Motorsport | Holden Commodore (VE) | 31 | | |
| 11 | 10 | (Australia) Jason Bargwanna | WPS Racing | Ford Falcon (BF) | 31 | | |
| 12 | 33 | (Australia) Lee Holdsworth | Garry Rogers Motorsport | Holden Commodore (VE) | 31 | | |
| 13 | 021 | (New Zealand) Shane van Gisbergen | Team Kiwi Racing | Ford Falcon (BF) | 31 | | |
| 14 | 20 | (Australia) Paul Dumbrell | Paul Weel Racing | Holden Commodore (VE) | 31 | | |
| 15 | 3 | (New Zealand) Jason Richards | Tasman Motorsport | Holden Commodore (VE) | 31 | | |
| 16 | 88 | (Australia) Jamie Whincup | Triple Eight Race Engineering | Ford Falcon (BF) | 31 | | |
| 17 | 39 | (Australia) Steven Ellery | Paul Morris Motorsport | Holden Commodore (VZ) | 31 | | |
| 18 | 111 | (Australia) John Bowe | Paul Cruickshank Racing | Ford Falcon (BF) | 31 | | |
| 19 | 55 | (Australia) Steve Owen | Rod Nash Racing | Holden Commodore (VZ) | 31 | | |
| 20 | 8 | (Brazil) Max Wilson | WPS Racing | Ford Falcon (BF) | 31 | | |
| 21 | 2 | (Australia) Mark Skaife | Holden Racing Team | Holden Commodore (VE) | 31 | | |
| 22 | 12 | (Australia) Andrew Jones | Brad Jones Racing | Ford Falcon (BF) | 31 | | |
| 23 | 14 | (New Zealand) Simon Wills | Brad Jones Racing | Ford Falcon (BF) | 31 | | |
| 24 | 26 | (Australia) Alan Gurr | Britek Motorsport | Ford Falcon (BF) | 31 | | |
| 25 | 6 | (New Zealand) Steven Richards | Ford Performance Racing | Ford Falcon (BF) | 30 | + 1 lap | |
| 26 | 7 | (Australia) Shane Price | Perkins Engineering | Holden Commodore (VE) | 30 | + 1 lap | |
| 27 | 50 | (Australia) Cameron McConville | Paul Weel Racing | Holden Commodore (VE) | 30 | + 1 lap | |
| Ret | 25 | (Australia) Jason Bright | Britek Motorsport | Ford Falcon (BF) | 28 | Retired | |
| Ret | 67 | (Australia) Paul Morris | Paul Morris Motorsport | Holden Commodore (VE) | 24 | Retired | |
| Ret | 22 | (Australia) Todd Kelly | Holden Racing Team | Holden Commodore (VE) | 13 | Retired | |
| Ret | 11 | (Australia) Jack Perkins | Perkins Engineering | Holden Commodore (VE) | 10 | Retired | |
Fastest Lap: Craig Lowndes (Triple Eight Race Engineering) - 1:26.3569 on lap 16
