= 2007 V8 Supercar Challenge =

2007 Supercar Championship event

Coordinates: 27°59′23″S 153°25′40″E

(Queensland) 2007 V8 Supercar Challenge
Event Information
- Round 11 of 14 in the 2007 V8 Supercar Championship Series
- Date: 19–21 October 2007
- Location: Surfers Paradise, Queensland
- Venue: Surfers Paradise Street Circuit
- Weather: Fine

Results
Race 1
| Distance | 27 laps | 120 km |
| Pole position | Garth Tander; HSV Dealer Team | 1:48.6322 |
| Winner | Garth Tander; HSV Dealer Team | 52:35.5753 |
Race 2
| Distance | 27 laps | 120 km |
| Winner | Garth Tander; HSV Dealer Team | 50:44.6631 |
Race 3
| Distance | 27 laps | 120 km |
| Winner | Steven Richards; Ford Performance Racing | 53:42.3815 |
Round Results
| First | Garth Tander; HSV Dealer Team | 58 pts |
| Second | Russell Ingall; Stone Brothers Racing | 49 pts |
| Third | Jason Richards; Tasman Motorsport | 40 pts |

The 2007 V8 Supercar Challenge is the eleventh round of the 2007 V8 Supercar season. It will be held on the weekend of the 18 to 21 October at the Surfers Paradise Street Circuit in Queensland.

== Results ==
=== Qualifying ===
| Pos | No | Name | Team | Part 3 | Part 2 | Part 1 |
|---|---|---|---|---|---|---|
| 1 | 16 | (Australia) Garth Tander | HSV Dealer Team | 1:48.6322 | | |
| 2 | 4 | (Australia) James Courtney | Stone Brothers Racing | 1:48.6790 | | |
| 3 | 88 | (Australia) Jamie Whincup | Triple Eight Race Engineering | 1:48.6973 | | |
| 4 | 9 | (Australia) Russell Ingall | Stone Brothers Racing | 1:49.0001 | | |
| 5 | 6 | (New Zealand) Steven Richards | Ford Performance Racing | 1:49.1267 | | |
| 6 | 888 | (Australia) Craig Lowndes | Triple Eight Race Engineering | 1:49.2155 | | |
| 7 | 17 | (Australia) Steven Johnson | Dick Johnson Racing | 1:49.3407 | | |
| 8 | 51 | (New Zealand) Greg Murphy | Tasman Motorsport | 1:49.3452 | | |
| 9 | 22 | (Australia) Todd Kelly | Holden Racing Team | 1:49.4028 | | |
| 10 | 20 | (Australia) Paul Dumbrell | Paul Weel Racing | | 1:49.5817 | |
| 11 | 1 | (Australia) Rick Kelly | HSV Dealer Team | | 1:49.6471 | |
| 12 | 18 | (Australia) Will Davison | Dick Johnson Racing | | 1:49.6481 | |
| 13 | 55 | (Australia) Steve Owen | Rod Nash Racing | | 1:49.7464 | |
| 14 | 3 | (New Zealand) Jason Richards | Tasman Motorsport | | 1:49.8974 | |
| 15 | 34 | (Australia) Dean Canto | Garry Rogers Motorsport | | 1:50.0552 | |
| 16 | 2 | (Australia) Mark Skaife | Holden Racing Team | | 1:50.0670 | |
| 17 | 33 | (Australia) Lee Holdsworth | Garry Rogers Motorsport | | 1:50.2638 | |
| 18 | 10 | (Australia) Jason Bargwanna | WPS Racing | | 1:50.7915 | |
| 19 | 12 | (Australia) Andrew Jones | Brad Jones Racing | | 1:51.2397 | |
| 20 | 8 | (Brazil) Max Wilson | WPS Racing | | | 1:50.4195 |
| 21 | 25 | (Australia) Jason Bright | Britek Motorsport | | | 1:50.6503 |
| 22 | 11 | (Australia) Jack Perkins | Perkins Engineering | | | 1:50.7566 |
| 23 | 021 | (New Zealand) Shane van Gisbergen | Team Kiwi Racing | | | 1:50.8394 |
| 24 | 14 | (New Zealand) Simon Wills | Brad Jones Racing | | | 1:50.9254 |
| 25 | 111 | (Australia) John Bowe | Paul Cruickshank Racing | | | 1:51.0629 |
| 26 | 7 | (Australia) Shane Price | Perkins Engineering | | | 1:51.1969 |
| 27 | 26 | (Australia) Alan Gurr | Britek Motorsport | | | 1:53.2697 |
| 28 | 39 | (Australia) Owen Kelly | Paul Morris Motorsport | | | 1:54.4440 |
| 29 | 50 | (Australia) Cameron McConville | Paul Weel Racing | | | DNS |
| 30 | 67 | (Australia) Paul Morris | Paul Morris Motorsport | | | DNS |
| 31 | 5 | (Australia) Mark Winterbottom | Ford Performance Racing | Excluded | Excluded | Excluded |

=== Race 1 results ===
| Pos | No | Name | Team | Laps | Time/retired | Grid | Points |
|---|---|---|---|---|---|---|---|
| 1 | 16 | (Australia) Garth Tander | HSV Dealer Team | 27 | 52:35.5753 | 1 | 24 |
| 2 | 88 | (Australia) Jamie Whincup | Triple Eight Race Engineering | 27 | 52:35.9827 | 3 | 20 |
| 3 | 888 | (Australia) Craig Lowndes | Triple Eight Race Engineering | 27 | 52:36.9792 | 6 | 17 |
| 4 | 9 | (Australia) Russell Ingall | Stone Brothers Racing | 27 | 52:38.4403 | 4 | 15 |
| 5 | 51 | (New Zealand) Greg Murphy | Tasman Motorsport | 27 | 52:38.4473 | 8 | 13 |
| 6 | 4 | (Australia) James Courtney | Stone Brothers Racing | 27 | 52:38.8810 | 2 | 12 |
| 7 | 1 | (Australia) Rick Kelly | HSV Dealer Team | 27 | 52:39.6331 | 11 | 11 |
| 8 | 17 | (Australia) Steven Johnson | Dick Johnson Racing | 27 | 52:40.5402 | 7 | 10 |
| 9 | 34 | (Australia) Dean Canto | Garry Rogers Motorsport | 27 | 52:42.0108 | 15 | 9 |
| 10 | 3 | (New Zealand) Jason Richards | Tasman Motorsport | 27 | 52:42.5921 | 14 | 8 |
| 11 | 18 | (Australia) Will Davison | Dick Johnson Racing | 27 | 52:43.2217 | 12 | 6 |
| 12 | 33 | (Australia) Lee Holdsworth | Garry Rogers Motorsport | 27 | 52:46.3328 | 17 | 5 |
| 13 | 8 | (Brazil) Max Wilson | WPS Racing | 27 | 52:47.6625 | 20 | 4 |
| 14 | 10 | (Australia) Jason Bargwanna | WPS Racing | 27 | 52:47.9577 | 18 | 3 |
| 15 | 55 | (Australia) Steve Owen | Rod Nash Racing | 27 | 52:49.7342 | 13 | 2 |
| 16 | 7 | (Australia) Jack Perkins | Perkins Engineering | 27 | 52:50.5548 | 22 | |
| 17 | 2 | (Australia) Mark Skaife | Holden Racing Team | 27 | 52:52.1881 | 16 | |
| 18 | 50 | (Australia) Cameron McConville | Paul Weel Racing | 27 | 52:52.8349 | 29 | |
| 19 | 111 | (Australia) John Bowe | Paul Cruickshank Racing | 27 | 52:53.6773 | 25 | |
| 20 | 5 | (Australia) Mark Winterbottom | Ford Performance Racing | 27 | 52:54.2361 | 31 | |
| 21 | 20 | (Australia) Paul Dumbrell | Paul Weel Racing | 27 | 53:47.8319 | 10 | |
| 22 | 021 | (New Zealand) Shane van Gisbergen | Team Kiwi Racing | 26 | + 1 Lap | 23 | |
| 23 | 26 | (Australia) Alan Gurr | Britek Motorsport | 26 | + 1 Lap | 27 | |
| 24 | 39 | (Australia) Owen Kelly | Paul Morris Motorsport | 26 | + 1 Lap | 28 | |
| Ret | 25 | (Australia) Jason Bright | Britek Motorsport | 23 | Accident | 21 | |
| Ret | 6 | (New Zealand) Steven Richards | Ford Performance Racing | 23 | Accident | 5 | |
| Ret | 22 | (Australia) Todd Kelly | Holden Racing Team | 22 | Accident | 9 | |
| Ret | 7 | (Australia) Shane Price | Perkins Engineering | 19 | Retired | 26 | |
| Ret | 67 | (Australia) Paul Morris | Paul Morris Motorsport | 13 | Engine | 30 | |
| Ret | 14 | (New Zealand) Simon Wills | Brad Jones Racing | 10 | Accident | 24 | |
| Ret | 12 | (Australia) Andrew Jones | Brad Jones Racing | 1 | Engine | 19 | |

=== Race 2 ===
| Pos | No | Name | Team | Laps | Time/retired | Grid | Points |
|---|---|---|---|---|---|---|---|
| 1 | 16 | (Australia) Garth Tander | HSV Dealer Team | 27 | 50:44.6631 | 1 | 24 |
| 2 | 88 | (Australia) Jamie Whincup | Triple Eight Race Engineering | 27 | 50:47.9659 | 2 | 20 |
| 3 | 9 | (Australia) Russell Ingall | Stone Brothers Racing | 27 | 50:59.5920 | 4 | 17 |
| 4 | 51 | (New Zealand) Greg Murphy | Tasman Motorsport | 27 | 51:00.8806 | 5 | 15 |
| 5 | 6 | (New Zealand) Steven Richards | Ford Performance Racing | 27 | 51:04.0491 | 25 | 13 |
| 6 | 3 | (New Zealand) Jason Richards | Tasman Motorsport | 27 | 51:11.1145 | 10 | 12 |
| 7 | 10 | (Australia) Jason Bargwanna | WPS Racing | 27 | 51:24.6200 | 14 | 11 |
| 8 | 2 | (Australia) Mark Skaife | Holden Racing Team | 27 | 51:25.1149 | 17 | 10 |
| 9 | 8 | (Brazil) Max Wilson | WPS Racing | 27 | 51:34.7815 | 13 | 9 |
| 10 | 50 | (Australia) Cameron McConville | Supercheap Auto Racing | 27 | 51:34.9989 | 18 | 8 |
| 11 | 111 | (Australia) John Bowe | Paul Cruickshank Racing | 27 | 51:35.1769 | 19 | 6 |
| 12 | 021 | (New Zealand) Shane van Gisbergen | Team Kiwi Racing | 27 | 51:40.1284 | 22 | 5 |
| 13 | 17 | (Australia) Steven Johnson | Dick Johnson Racing | 27 | 51:41.0429 | 8 | 4 |
| 14 | 34 | (Australia) Dean Canto | Garry Rogers Motorsport | 27 | 51:41.7871 | 9 | 3 |
| 15 | 4 | (Australia) James Courtney | Stone Brothers Racing | 27 | 51:46.7870 | 6 | 2 |
| 16 | 1 | (Australia) Rick Kelly | Toll HSV Dealer Team | 27 | 51:49.1821 | 7 | |
| 17 | 5 | (Australia) Mark Winterbottom | Ford Performance Racing | 27 | 51:50.0028 | 20 | |
| 18 | 18 | (Australia) Will Davison | Dick Johnson Racing | 27 | 51:50.7612 | 11 | |
| 19 | 7 | (Australia) Jack Perkins | Perkins Engineering | 27 | 51:56.6939 | 16 | |
| 20 | 14 | (New Zealand) Simon Wills | Brad Jones Racing | 27 | 52:07.7729 | 29 | |
| 21 | 55 | (Australia) Steve Owen | Rod Nash Racing | 27 | 52:10.7385 | 15 | |
| 22 | 7 | (Australia) Shane Price | Perkins Engineering | 27 | 52:19.8425 | 27 | |
| 23 | 39 | (Australia) Owen Kelly | Paul Morris Motorsport | 27 | 52:29.6667 | 24 | |
| 24 | 888 | (Australia) Craig Lowndes | Triple Eight Race Engineering | 27 | 52:42.2463 | 3 | |
| 25 | 67 | (Australia) Paul Morris | Paul Morris Motorsport | 26 | + 1 Lap | 28 | |
| 26 | 22 | (Australia) Todd Kelly | Holden Racing Team | 26 | + 1 Lap | 26 | |
| 27 | 33 | (Australia) Lee Holdsworth | Garry Rogers Motorsport | 26 | + 1 Lap | 12 | |
| 28 | 12 | (Australia) Andrew Jones | Brad Jones Racing | 20 | + 7 Laps | 30 | |
| Ret | 26 | (Australia) Alan Gurr | Britek Motorsport | 1 | Accident | 23 | |
| DNS | 20 | (Australia) Paul Dumbrell | Paul Weel Racing | | | 21 | |
| DNS | 25 | (Australia) Jason Bright | Britek Motorsport | | | | |

=== Race 3 ===
| Pos | No. | Name | Team | Vehicle | Laps | Time/Retired | Grid |
|---|---|---|---|---|---|---|---|
| 1 | 6 | (New Zealand) Steven Richards | Ford Performance Racing | Ford Falcon (BF) | 27 | 53:42.3815 | |
| 2 | 3 | (New Zealand) Jason Richards | Tasman Motorsport | Holden Commodore (VE) | 27 | | |
| 3 | 9 | (Australia) Russell Ingall | Stone Brothers Racing | Ford Falcon (BF) | 27 | | |
| 4 | 4 | (Australia) James Courtney | Stone Brothers Racing | Ford Falcon (BF) | 27 | | |
| 5 | 5 | (Australia) Mark Winterbottom | Ford Performance Racing | Ford Falcon (BF) | 27 | | |
| 6 | 1 | (Australia) Rick Kelly | HSV Dealer Team | Holden Commodore (VE) | 27 | | |
| 7 | 888 | (Australia) Craig Lowndes | Triple Eight Race Engineering | Ford Falcon (BF) | 27 | | |
| 8 | 16 | (Australia) Garth Tander | HSV Dealer Team | Holden Commodore (VE) | 27 | | |
| 9 | 50 | (Australia) Cameron McConville | Paul Weel Racing | Holden Commodore (VE) | 27 | | |
| 10 | 8 | (Brazil) Max Wilson | WPS Racing | Ford Falcon (BF) | 27 | | |
| 11 | 18 | (Australia) Will Davison | Dick Johnson Racing | Ford Falcon (BF) | 27 | | |
| 12 | 10 | (Australia) Jason Bargwanna | WPS Racing | Ford Falcon (BF) | 27 | | |
| 13 | 51 | (New Zealand) Greg Murphy | Tasman Motorsport | Holden Commodore (VE) | 27 | | |
| 14 | 33 | (Australia) Lee Holdsworth | Garry Rogers Motorsport | Holden Commodore (VE) | 27 | | |
| 15 | 14 | (New Zealand) Simon Wills | Brad Jones Racing | Ford Falcon (BF) | 27 | | |
| 16 | 26 | (Australia) Alan Gurr | Britek Motorsport | Ford Falcon (BF) | 27 | | |
| Ret | 34 | (Australia) Dean Canto | Garry Rogers Motorsport | Holden Commodore (VE) | 26 | Retired | |
| Ret | 88 | (Australia) Jamie Whincup | Triple Eight Race Engineering | Ford Falcon (BF) | 24 | Retired | |
| Ret | 17 | (Australia) Steven Johnson | Dick Johnson Racing | Ford Falcon (BF) | 24 | Retired | |
| Ret | 2 | (Australia) Mark Skaife | Holden Racing Team | Holden Commodore (VE) | 23 | Retired | |
| Ret | 12 | (Australia) Andrew Jones | Brad Jones Racing | Ford Falcon (BF) | 20 | Retired | |
| Ret | 7 | (Australia) Shane Price | Perkins Engineering | Holden Commodore (VE) | 20 | Retired | |
| Ret | 11 | (Australia) Jack Perkins | Perkins Engineering | Holden Commodore (VE) | 15 | Retired | |
| Ret | 55 | (Australia) Steve Owen | Rod Nash Racing | Holden Commodore (VZ) | 10 | Retired | |
| Ret | 111 | (Australia) John Bowe | Paul Cruickshank Racing | Ford Falcon (BF) | 5 | Retired | |
| Ret | 021 | (New Zealand) Shane van Gisbergen | Team Kiwi Racing | Ford Falcon (BF) | 4 | Retired | |
| Ret | 22 | (Australia) Todd Kelly | Holden Racing Team | Holden Commodore (VE) | 4 | Retired | |
| Ret | 39 | (Australia) Owen Kelly | Paul Morris Motorsport | Holden Commodore (VZ) | 4 | Retired | |
| Ret | 20 | (Australia) Paul Dumbrell | Paul Weel Racing | Holden Commodore (VE) | 0 | Retired | |
| Ret | 67 | (Australia) Paul Morris | Paul Morris Motorsport | Holden Commodore (VE) | 0 | Retired | |
| DNS | 25 | (Australia) Jason Bright | Britek Motorsport | Ford Falcon (BF) | | Did not start | |
Fastest Lap: Garth Tander (Holden Racing Team) - 1:49.8352 on lap 14
