= 2007 V8 Supercars Winton round =

2007 Supercar Championship event

(Victoria (state)) 2007 Winton round of the V8 Supercar Championship
Event Information
- Round 4 of 14 in the 2007 V8 Supercar Championship Series
- Date: 18–20 May 2007
- Location: Benalla, Victoria
- Venue: Winton Motor Raceway
- Weather: Rain

Results
Race 1
Distance	40 laps	120 km
Pole position	Todd Kelly; Holden Racing Team	1:23.4793
Winner	Jamie Whincup; Triple Eight Race Engineering	1:11:43.2503
Race 2
Distance	40 laps	120 km
Winner	Garth Tander; HSV Dealer Team	1:09:36.3676
Race 3
Distance	40 laps	120 km
Winner	Garth Tander; HSV Dealer Team	1:00:45.9377
Round Results
First	Jamie Whincup; Triple Eight Race Engineering	64 pts
Second	Garth Tander; HSV Dealer Team	63 pts
Third	Rick Kelly; HSV Dealer Team	51 pts

The 2007 Winton round of the V8 Supercar Championship is the fourth of the 2007 V8 Supercar season. It was held on the weekend of 18 to 20 May at Winton Motor Raceway in Victoria (Australia).

== Pre-round ==
Two main stories occurred between the previously race at Pukekohe and this round. Firstly Brad Jones announced his immediate retirement from the V8 Supercar championship after a 20-year career. Jones will be replaced from the Winton round for the remainder of the season by Simon Wills. Secondly the Supercheap Auto Racing team was sold by Kees Weel to the No Limit Group. The sale however later fell apart without being completed.

== Qualifying ==
Qualifying was held on Saturday 19 May 2007.

=== Part 1 ===
The first session of qualifying began with Todd Kelly quickest, however his teammate at the Holden Racing Team Mark Skaife began with a spin. As Winton is a test track for a number of the teams, it could be seen that these teams had an advantage over the other teams. After the first session, Garth Tander was quickest from Todd Kelly and Jack Daniel's Racing’s Shane Price. However some of the bigger names did not back the top 20 drivers to advance to the second part of qualifying including Greg Murphy and Russell Ingall. Ingall was later relegated to the back of the grid after failing to have his car weighed after qualifying.

=== Part 2 ===
In the second part of qualifying, Jason Richards of Tasman Motorsport was quickest at the start of the session. The session was relatively clean, however Steven Richards ran wide through the mud at turn 11. After the session, Todd Kelly, Garth Tander and Jason Richards were the top three, with both Mark Skaife and Craig Lowndes missing out.

=== Part 3 ===
Part 3 of qualifying was a clean session, with Todd Kelly leading from Tander and Price at the midpoint of the session. As the session progressed, Tander and Jason Richards battled for second position.

After qualifying had finished, Todd Kelly took pole position from Garth Tander and Jason Richards. In their best qualifying session of the year, the Jack Daniels Racing team drivers of Shane Price and Jack Perkins qualified fifth and eighth respectively.

== Race 1 ==
Race 1 was held on Saturday 19 May 2007. The race started in wet conditions and this caused a number of incidents to occur in the first few laps. Garth Tander was able to take the lead on the first lap, however a number of drivers including Jason Bright, Mark Skaife, Russell Ingall and James Courtney all went off the track on the first lap.

On lap 2, Jason Richards run wide at turn 11 and went off the track from second position, and then on lap 3, the Todd Kelly in second collided with the leader Garth Tander causing Tander to spin. He rejoined the race in 12th position. Following this incident, Todd Kelly then spun off the track on lap 6 at turn 11 and got stuck in the gravel trap, which caused the safety car to come out.

The race was restarted on lap 9, however almost immediately Paul Dumbrell collided with Russell Ingall causing steering damage to Ingall's car which then went off the track and into the gravel trap. This again caused the safety car to come out.

At the restart on lap 12, Lee Holdsworth was able to take the lead from Mark Winterbottom before Winterbottom retook the lead at turn 3 of the same lap. Soon after, the safety car came out again as Todd Kelly spun off the track. Once the compulsory pit stops had been completed, Jamie Whincup lead from Rick Kelly and Craig Lowndes.

Towards the end of the race Mark Winterbottom, who was using slick tyres on the drying track collided with Max Wilson which caused Winterbottom to go off at turn 11 and caused the safety car to come out for a fourth time. The safety car came in with 3 laps to go, and James Courtney made a number of positions running on dry tyres.

At the end of the 40 laps, Jamie Whincup gave Ford their first win of the season from Steven Richards and Rick Kelly after Courtney was given a penalty for an incident wit Greg Murphy on the penultimate lap.

== Race 2 ==
Race 2 was held on Sunday 20 May 2007. The race was also held in wet conditions however the start was relatively clean. Mark Skaife once again had a bad race, running off the circuit at turn 11 on lap 5. He was also the first driver to change from wet weather tyres to slicks as the racing line dried on lap 10. This began a trend where the drivers lower down the field also changed to slick to try to take advantage of the drying track, while the leaders stayed on wet weather tyres.

On lap 14, Jason Richards spun off the track and crashed into the wall on slick tyres after driving off the dry race line. Craig Lowndes also had a spin at turn 1. The first safety car of the race occurred when Lee Holdsworth spun off the track and crashed heavily into the wall at turn 4. This caused major damage to the rear of the Garry Rogers Motorsport car. During the safety car period, it started raining again and the drivers that changed to slicks had to go back to wet weather tyres.

After the restart on lap 25, Jamie Whincup took the lead from Tander, however Tander retook the lead at turn 3 of the same lap. Over the last 10 laps, Tander and Whincup battled for the lead in damp conditions and while dealing with lapped traffic. At the end of the race, Garth Tander won, from Jamie Whincup and teammate Rick Kelly.

== Race 3 ==
Race 3 was held on Sunday 20 May 2007. The race began in dry conditions and this remained the same for the remainder of the race. Garth Tander lead the race in the early stages of the race. Steve Johnson retired for the race with an engine problem, and Mark Skaife also had a problem with the suspension of his car, ending a bad weekend for him.

The only safety car of the race was due to Paul Morris spinning off at turn 12 and becoming stuck in the sand trap. This was caused by oil which had been spilt on the approach to turn 12 and a number of drivers also rain wide and off the circuit because of the oil, however Morris was the only driver to get stuck.

The safety car came in on lap 27 and Tander continued to lead the race until the finish where he won the race from Jamie Whincup and Rick Kelly.

== Results ==
=== Qualifying ===
Pos	No	Name	Team	Part 3	Part 2	Part 1
1	22	(Australia) Todd Kelly	Holden Racing Team	1:23.4793		
2	16	(Australia) Garth Tander	HSV Dealer Team	1:23.4843		
3	3	(New Zealand) Jason Richards	Tasman Motorsport	1:23.5698		
4	5	(Australia) Mark Winterbottom	Ford Performance Racing	1:23.7103		
5	7	(Australia) Shane Price	Perkins Engineering	1:23.7606		
6	33	(Australia) Lee Holdsworth	Garry Rogers Motorsport	1:23.7836		
7	1	(Australia) Rick Kelly	HSV Dealer Team	1:23.8649		
8	11	(Australia) Jack Perkins	Perkins Engineering	1:23.8709		
9	34	(Australia) Dean Canto	Garry Rogers Motorsport	1:23.9689		
10	25	(Australia) Jason Bright	Britek Motorsport	1:24.6474		
11	55	(Australia) Steve Owen	Rod Nash Racing		1:23.9620	
12	888	(Australia) Craig Lowndes	Triple Eight Race Engineering		1:23.9815	
13	17	(Australia) Steven Johnson	Dick Johnson Racing		1:24.0044	
14	20	(Australia) Paul Dumbrell	Paul Weel Racing		1:24.0130	
15	18	(Australia) Will Davison	Dick Johnson Racing		1:24.0181	
16	2	(Australia) Mark Skaife	Holden Racing Team		1:24.1041	
17	6	(New Zealand) Steven Richards	Ford Performance Racing		1:24.1088	
18	4	(Australia) James Courtney	Stone Brothers Racing		1:24.1182	
19	12	(Australia) Andrew Jones	Brad Jones Racing		1:24.1491	
20	88	(Australia) Jamie Whincup	Triple Eight Race Engineering		1:24.2877	
21	021	(New Zealand) Paul Radisich	Team Kiwi Racing			1:24.4968
22	51	(New Zealand) Greg Murphy	Tasman Motorsport			1:24.5398
23	8	(Brazil) Max Wilson	WPS Racing			1:24.6851
24	67	(Australia) Paul Morris	Paul Morris Motorsport			1:24.8016
25	10	(Australia) Jason Bargwanna	WPS Racing			1:24.8283
26	111	(Australia) John Bowe	Paul Cruickshank Racing			1:24.9139
27	39	(New Zealand) Fabian Coulthard	Paul Morris Motorsport			1:25.0480
28	50	(Australia) Cameron McConville	Paul Weel Racing			1:25.1131
29	14	(New Zealand) Simon Wills	Brad Jones Racing			1:25.1889
30	26	(Australia) Alan Gurr	Britek Motorsport			1:25.2665
31	9	(Australia) Russell Ingall	Stone Brothers Racing			Penalty

=== Race 1 results ===
Pos	No	Name	Team	Laps	Time/Retired	Grid	Points
1	88	(Australia) Jamie Whincup	Triple Eight Race Engineering	40	1h 11m 43.2503s	20	24
2	6	(New Zealand) Steven Richards	Ford Performance Racing	40	+ 2.097s	17	20
3	1	(Australia) Rick Kelly	HSV Dealer Team	40	+ 7.663s	7	17
4	16	(Australia) Garth Tander	HSV Dealer Team	40	+ 7.885s	2	15
5	33	(Australia) Lee Holdsworth	Garry Rogers Motorsport	40	+ 8.8814sec	6	13
6	17	(Australia) Steven Johnson	Dick Johnson Racing	40	+ 14.164s	13	12
7	25	(Australia) Jason Bright	Britek Motorsport	40	+ 20.348s	10	11
8	67	(Australia) Paul Morris	Paul Morris Motorsport	40	+ 21.655s	24	10
9	8	(Brazil) Max Wilson	WPS Racing	40	+ 21.895s	23	9
10	7	(Australia) Shane Price	Perkins Engineering	40	+ 23.545s	5	8
11	10	(Australia) Jason Bargwanna	WPS Racing	40	+ 23.714s	25	6
12	50	(Australia) Cameron McConville	Paul Weel Racing	40	+ 24.257sec	28	5
13	55	(Australia) Steve Owen	Rod Nash Racing	40	+ 25.848s	11	4
14	111	(Australia) John Bowe	Paul Cruickshank Racing	40	+ 26.283s	26	3
15	26	(Australia) Alan Gurr	Britek Motorsport	40	+ 27.682sec	30	2
16	14	(New Zealand) Simon Wills	Brad Jones Racing	40	+ 28.027s	29	
17	4	(Australia) James Courtney	Stone Brothers Racing	40	+33.722s	18	
18	888	(Australia) Craig Lowndes	Triple Eight Race Engineering	40	+34.672s	12	
19	34	(Australia) Dean Canto	Garry Rogers Motorsport	40	+42.053s	9	
20	39	(New Zealand) Fabian Coulthard	Paul Morris Motorsport	40	+48.564s	27	
21	2	(Australia) Mark Skaife	Holden Racing Team	40	+52.593s	16	
22	11	(Australia) Jack Perkins	Perkins Engineering	40	+54.026s	8	
23	3	(New Zealand) Jason Richards	Tasman Motorsport	40	+75.660s	3	
24	021	(New Zealand) Paul Radisich	Team Kiwi Racing	39	+1 Lap	21	
25	20	(Australia) Paul Dumbrell	Paul Weel Racing	39	+1 Lap	14	
26	5	(Australia) Mark Winterbottom	Ford Performance Racing	39	+1 Lap	4	
27	22	(Australia) Todd Kelly	Holden Racing Team	37	+3 Laps	1	
Ret	51	(New Zealand) Greg Murphy	Tasman Motorsport	37	Accident	22	
Ret	12	(Australia) Andrew Jones	Brad Jones Racing	29	Accident	19	
Ret	9	(Australia) Russell Ingall	Stone Brothers Racing	14	Accident	31	
Ret	18	(Australia) Will Davison	Dick Johnson Racing	4	Suspension	15	

=== Race 2 results ===
Pos	No	Name	Team	Laps	Time/Retired	Grid	Points
1	16	Garth Tander	Toll HSV Dealer Team	40	1:09:36.3676	4	24
2	88	Jamie Whincup	Team Vodafone	40	+0.3454sec	1	20
3	1	Rick Kelly	Toll HSV Dealer Team	40	+5.9565sec	3	17
4	51	Greg Murphy	Tasman Motorsport	40	+7.9541sec	28	15
5	17	Steven Johnson	Jim Beam Racing	40	+9.0035sec	6	13
6	888	Craig Lowndes	Team Vodafone	40	+9.1619sec	18	12
7	55	Steve Owen	Autobarn Racing	40	+11.8704sec	13	11
8	9	Russell Ingall	Stone Brothers Racing	40	+11.9635sec	30	10
9	25	Jason Bright	Fujitsu Racing	40	+13.1677sec	7	9
10	12	Andrew Jones	Team BOC	40	+1:19.7096	29	8
11	22	Todd Kelly	Holden Racing Team	40	+1:20.6503	27	6
12	021	Paul Radisich	Team Kiwi Racing	40	+1:23.9728	24	5
13	7	Shane Price	Jack Daniel's Racing	40	+1:25.6701	10	4
14	18	Will Davison	Jim Beam Racing	40	+1:35.6745	31	3
15	4	James Courtney	Stone Brothers Racing	39	+1 lap	17	2
16	6	Steven Richards	Ford Performance Racing	39	+1 lap	2	
17	2	Mark Skaife	Holden Racing Team	39	+1 lap	21	
18	11	Jack Perkins	Jack Daniel's Racing	39	+1 lap	22	
19	39	Fabian Coulthard	Team Sirromet Wines	39	+1 lap	20	
20	5	Mark Winterbottom	Ford Performance Racing	39	+1 lap	26	
21	50	Cameron McConville	Supercheap Auto Racing	39	+1 lap	12	
22	10	Jason Bargwanna	WPS Racing	39	+1 lap	11	
23	34	Dean Canto	Garry Rogers Motorsport	39	+1 lap	19	
24	26	Alan Gurr	Irwin Racing	39	+1 lap	15	
25	20	Paul Dumbrell	Supercheap Auto Racing	39	+1 lap	25	
DNF	14	Simon Wills	Team BOC	38		16	
DNF	111	John Bowe	Glenfords Racing	33		14	
DNF	8	Max Wilson	WPS Racing	32	Engine	9	
DNF	33	Lee Holdsworth	Garry Rogers Motorsport	16	Accident	5	
DNF	67	Paul Morris	Team Sirromet Wines	14		8	
DNF	3	Jason Richards	Tasman Motorsport	13	Accident	23	

=== Race 3 results ===
Pos	No	Name	Team	Laps	Time/Retired	Grid	Points
1	16	Garth Tander	Toll HSV Dealer Team	40	1:00:45.9377	1	24
2	88	Jamie Whincup	Team Vodafone	40	+1.8952sec	2	20
3	1	Rick Kelly	Toll HSV Dealer Team	40	+2.4349sec	3	17
4	22	Todd Kelly	Holden Racing Team	40	+3.1202sec	11	15
5	888	Craig Lowndes	Team Vodafone	40	+6.7614sec	6	13
6	9	Russell Ingall	Stone Brothers Racing	40	+7.3996sec	8	12
7	51	Greg Murphy	Tasman Motorsport	40	+14.1933sec	4	11
8	4	James Courtney	Stone Brothers Racing	40	+14.6006sec	15	10
9	18	Will Davison	Jim Beam Racing	40	+14.9097sec	14	9
10	5	Mark Winterbottom	Ford Performance Racing	40	+15.3716sec	20	8
11	55	Steve Owen	Autobarn Racing	40	+16.1592sec	7	6
12	6	Steven Richards	Ford Performance Racing	40	+16.6960sec	16	5
13	021	Paul Radisich	Team Kiwi Racing	40	+18.5289sec	12	4
14	34	Dean Canto	Garry Rogers Motorsport	40	+19.2168sec	23	3
15	10	Jason Bargwanna	WPS Racing	40	+20.1869sec	22	2
16	3	Jason Richards	Tasman Motorsport	40	+20.8209sec	31	
17	111	John Bowe	Glenfords Racing	40	+27.3438sec	27	
18	7	Shane Price	Jack Daniel's Racing	40	+27.9096sec	13	
19	39	Fabian Coulthard	Team Sirromet Wines	40	+28.2952sec	19	
20	12	Andrew Jones	Team BOC	40	+29.1002sec	10	
21	20	Paul Dumbrell	Supercheap Auto Racing	40	+29.5542sec	25	
22	50	Cameron McConville	Supercheap Auto Racing	40	+29.8675sec	21	
23	14	Simon Wills	Team BOC	40	+30.3273sec	26	
24	25	Jason Bright	Fujitsu Racing	40	+31.5099sec	9	
25	26	Alan Gurr	Irwin Racing	40	+31.8353sec	24	
26	2	Mark Skaife	Holden Racing Team	36	+4 laps	17	
DNF	8	Max Wilson	WPS Racing	26	Brakes	28	
DNF	67	Paul Morris	Team Sirromet Wines	21	Accident	30	
DNF	17	Steven Johnson	Jim Beam Racing	10	Engine	5	
DNS	11	Jack Perkins	Jack Daniel's Racing				
DNS	33	Lee Holdsworth	Garry Rogers Motorsport				
