= 2007 Perth 400 =

Motor race in Perth, Western Australia

(Western Australia) 2007 BigPond 400
Event Information
- Round 2 of 14 in the 2007 V8 Supercar Championship Series
- Date: 23–25 March 2007
- Location: Perth, Western Australia
- Venue: Barbagallo Raceway
- Weather: Fine

Results
Race 1
Distance	50 laps	120 km
Pole position	Garth Tander; HSV Dealer Team	56.0511
Winner	Garth Tander; HSV Dealer Team	51:31.2237
Race 2
Distance	50 laps	120 km
Winner	Garth Tander; HSV Dealer Team	52:22.0384
Race 3
Distance	50 laps	120 km
Winner	Garth Tander; HSV Dealer Team	52:25.6340
Round Results
First	Garth Tander; HSV Dealer Team	72 pts
Second	Rick Kelly; HSV Dealer Team	57 pts
Third	Mark Skaife; Holden Racing Team	54 pts

The 2007 BigPond 400 is the second round of the 2007 V8 Supercar season. It was held on the weekend of the 23rd to 25 March at Barbagallo Raceway in Wanneroo, north of Perth, Western Australia. The round was significant in that John Bowe became the driver with the most round starts in the championship after surpassing Peter Brock. It was also significant in that it was Paul Radisich's first round after a major crash at Bathurst in 2006.

== Qualifying ==
Qualifying was held on Saturday 25 March 2007.

=== Part 1 ===
Qualifying started with 30 cars hitting the track instead of the usual 31 after a major accident between Jason Bright and Jason Richards after Bright had an engine failure going through turn 4. He (Bright) pulled towards the short cut to go off the track across the path of Jason Richards. The damage to the Fujitsu Racing car was very extensive, so severe that Bright had to withdraw from the entire round.

Paul Dumbrell was one of ten drivers which did not make the top twenty due to a linkage breaking off the throttle pedal. Jamie Whincup also had a spin into the gravel trap at turn 6 which prompted the session to be red flagged. Whincup was able to recover to make the next part of qualifying. Other drivers who went off the circuit included Max Wilson and James Courtney.

=== Part 2 ===
Session 2 saw Garth Tander set the fastest lap of the session and then sat out for most of the remaining session. The other drivers which were fast in this session were Rick Kelly, Mark Skaife and Todd Kelly. Max Wilson also had another off in this session when he ran wide at turn 7 and through the sand trap.

=== Part 3 ===
The final session saw the top ten drivers fight for pole. The session was relatively quiet, however Jamie Whincup went off the track in turn 1 by locking the rear tyres and Will Davison ran off the track at turn four. The final results from qualifying was Garth Tander took pole, from Rick Kelly in second and Craig Lowndes in third.

== Race 1 ==
Race 1 was held on Saturday 25 March 2007. It started with a relatively smooth start for the first lap, how this did not last long with Cameron McConville tagging John Bowe in turn 4, causing Bowe to go off the track. Over the next couple of laps, Mark Skaife and Craig Lowndes had a major battle over 3rd place, with both drivers changing positions a number of times.

Garth Tander continued to lead the race, until he took his compulsory pit stop on lap 22, allowing his team mate Rick Kelly to take first place. However Rick pitted on the next lap.

After all of the compulsory pit stops were done, Tander came out in first, with Rick Kelly in second and Skaife in third. Todd Kelly and Craig Lowndes continued to battle over fourth position, until on lap 38 when Todd Kelly ran off the track at the first corner and bogged the car in the sand trap. This caused the first safety car of the race. Todd Kelly communicated to the team after the incident that "the brakes had let go, and there was brake fluid throughout the cabin."

With three laps to go, Max Wilson collided with John Bowe causing Bowe to get beached at corner 7. This didn’t cause a safety car due to the closeness of the end of the race, but rather a localised yellow flag. The race was won by Toll HSV Dealer Team’s Garth Tander with his team mate Rick Kelly second, and HRT’s Mark Skaife in third.

== Race 2 ==
Race 2 was held on Sunday 26 March 2007. Off the start line, Craig Lowndes was able to get past 3rd place Mark Skaife and raced behind Garth Tander and Rick Kelly. However, on lap 9 Skaife was able to retake 3rd by overtaking Lowndes at turn 6. Lowndes struggled with tyres for the next few laps and pitted as soon as the pit stop window opened.

On lap 21, Cameron McConville was turned around by Steven Richards at the first corner after leaving the pitlane. Team Vodafones’s Jamie Whincup was given a drive through penalty for speeding in the pit lane after not turning on his pit speed limiter. Brad Jones also had a minor off at turn 7 during the second half of the race.

On lap 44, Steve Owen ran off the track at turn 4 after contact with Steven Richards and then crashed into the tyre barriers at turn 7 on the same lap after stating on the radio that he had no brakes. This prompted the first safety car of the race. James Courtney also had engine troubles and retired from the race on the same lap.

Following the restart, Tander went on to win the race, with Rick Kelly in second and Skaife in third.

== Race 3 ==
Race 3 was held on Sunday 26 March 2007. The race saw a close fight between both Toll HSV Dealer Team cars and Mark Skaife. The race saw James Courtney have a large crash after steering failure going through the turn 3 complex of the track. This caused his retirement on the 28th lap.

Overall Garth Tander won the race from his team mate Rick Kelly with Mark Skaife in third. This gave Tander not only the round win, but also the clean sweep of taking pole position as well as all three race wins.

== Results ==
=== Qualifying ===
Pos	No	Name	Team	Vehicle	Part 3	Part 2	Part 1
1	16	(Australia) Garth Tander	HSV Dealer Team	Holden Commodore (VE)	0:56.0511		
2	1	(Australia) Rick Kelly	HSV Dealer Team	Holden Commodore (VE)	0:56.2729		
3	888	(Australia) Craig Lowndes	Triple Eight Race Engineering	Ford Falcon (BF)	0:56.3653		
4	2	(Australia) Mark Skaife	Holden Racing Team	Holden Commodore (VE)	0:56.3879		
5	22	(Australia) Todd Kelly	Holden Racing Team	Holden Commodore (VE)	0:56.3927		
6	4	(Australia) James Courtney	Stone Brothers Racing	Ford Falcon (BF)	0:56.4623		
7	18	(Australia) Will Davison	Dick Johnson Racing	Ford Falcon (BF)	0:56.4645		
8	17	(Australia) Steven Johnson	Dick Johnson Racing	Ford Falcon (BF)	0:56.5458		
9	88	(Australia) Jamie Whincup	Triple Eight Race Engineering	Ford Falcon (BF)	0:56.6975		
10	33	(Australia) Lee Holdsworth	Garry Rogers Motorsport	Holden Commodore (VZ)	0:56.8341		
11	51	(New Zealand) Greg Murphy	Tasman Motorsport	Holden Commodore (VE)		0:56.7067	
12	3	(New Zealand) Jason Richards	Tasman Motorsport	Holden Commodore (VE)		0:56.7488	
13	6	(New Zealand) Steven Richards	Ford Performance Racing	Ford Falcon (BF)		0:56.7630	
14	8	(Brazil) Max Wilson	WPS Racing	Ford Falcon (BF)		0:56.8494	
15	5	(Australia) Mark Winterbottom	Ford Performance Racing	Ford Falcon (BF)		0:56.8741	
16	55	(Australia) Steve Owen	Rod Nash Racing	Holden Commodore (VZ)		0:56.8907	
17	9	(Australia) Russell Ingall	Stone Brothers Racing	Ford Falcon (BF)		0:56.8962	
18	7	(Australia) Shane Price	Perkins Engineering	Holden Commodore (VE)		0:56.9461	
19	67	(Australia) Paul Morris	Paul Morris Motorsport	Holden Commodore (VE)		0:57.0128	
20	10	(Australia) Jason Bargwanna	WPS Racing	Ford Falcon (BF)		0:57.2065	
21	021	(New Zealand) Paul Radisich	Team Kiwi Racing	Ford Falcon (BF)			0:57.1294
22	20	(Australia) Paul Dumbrell	Paul Weel Racing	Holden Commodore (VZ)			0:57.1867
23	34	(Australia) Dean Canto	Garry Rogers Motorsport	Holden Commodore (VE)			0:57.1965
24	39	(New Zealand) Fabian Coulthard	Paul Morris Motorsport	Holden Commodore (VZ)			0:57.3064
25	11	(Australia) Jack Perkins	Perkins Engineering	Holden Commodore (VZ)			0:57.3077
26	50	(Australia) Cameron McConville	Paul Weel Racing	Holden Commodore (VZ)			0:57.3728
27	111	(Australia) John Bowe	Paul Cruickshank Racing	Ford Falcon (BF)			0:57.4124
28	12	(Australia) Andrew Jones	Brad Jones Racing	Ford Falcon (BF)			0:57.4610
29	26	(Australia) Alan Gurr	Britek Motorsport	Ford Falcon (BF)			0:57.4985
30	14	(Australia) Brad Jones	Brad Jones Racing	Ford Falcon (BF)			0:57.4985
-	25	(Australia) Jason Bright	Britek Motorsport	Ford Falcon (BF)			no time

=== Race 1 results ===
Pos	No	Name	Team	Vehicle	Laps	Time/Retired	Grid	Points
1	16	(Australia) Garth Tander	HSV Dealer Team	Holden Commodore (VE)	50	51:31.2237	1	24
2	1	(Australia) Rick Kelly	HSV Dealer Team	Holden Commodore (VE)	50	+ 0.299	2	20
3	2	(Australia) Mark Skaife	Holden Racing Team	Holden Commodore (VE)	50	+ 3.670	4	17
4	888	(Australia) Craig Lowndes	Triple Eight Race Engineering	Ford Falcon (BF)	50	+ 7.027	3	15
5	17	(Australia) Steven Johnson	Dick Johnson Racing	Ford Falcon (BF)	50	+ 7.653	8	13
6	18	(Australia) Will Davison	Dick Johnson Racing	Ford Falcon (BF)	50	+ 8.244	7	12
7	88	(Australia) Jamie Whincup	Triple Eight Race Engineering	Ford Falcon (BF)	50	+ 10.218	9	11
8	51	(New Zealand) Greg Murphy	Tasman Motorsport	Holden Commodore (VE)	50	+ 10.218	11	10
9	33	(Australia) Lee Holdsworth	Garry Rogers Motorsport	Holden Commodore (VZ)	50	+ 13.913	10	9
10	5	(Australia) Mark Winterbottom	Ford Performance Racing	Ford Falcon (BF)	50	+ 16.790	15	8
11	4	(Australia) James Courtney	Stone Brothers Racing	Ford Falcon (BF)	50	+ 17.198	6	6
12	55	(Australia) Steve Owen	Rod Nash Racing	Holden Commodore (VZ)	50	+ 17.845	16	5
13	7	(Australia) Shane Price	Perkins Engineering	Holden Commodore (VE)	50	+ 18.334	18	4
14	3	(New Zealand) Jason Richards	Tasman Motorsport	Holden Commodore (VE)	50	+ 19.216	12	3
15	67	(Australia) Paul Morris	Paul Morris Motorsport	Holden Commodore (VE)	50	+ 19.559	19	2
16	021	(New Zealand) Paul Radisich	Team Kiwi Racing	Ford Falcon (BF)	50	+ 20.161	21	
17	39	(New Zealand) Fabian Coulthard	Paul Morris Motorsport	Holden Commodore (VZ)	50	+ 21.640	24	
18	20	(Australia) Paul Dumbrell	Paul Weel Racing	Holden Commodore (VE)	50	+ 23.830	22	
19	50	(Australia) Cameron McConville	Paul Weel Racing	Holden Commodore (VZ)	50	+ 24.101	26	
20	14	(Australia) Brad Jones	Brad Jones Racing	Ford Falcon (BF)	50	+ 25.505	30	
21	11	(Australia) Jack Perkins	Perkins Engineering	Holden Commodore (VZ)	50	+ 28.962	25	
22	6	(New Zealand) Steven Richards	Ford Performance Racing	Ford Falcon (BF)	50	+ 36.204	13	
23	8	(Australia) Max Wilson	WPS Racing	Ford Falcon (BF)	50	+ 39.535	14	
24	9	(Australia) Russell Ingall	Stone Brothers Racing	Ford Falcon (BF)	50	+ 42.560	17	
25	10	(Australia) Jason Bargwanna	WPS Racing	Ford Falcon (BF)	49	+ 1 lap	20	
26	12	(Australia) Andrew Jones	Brad Jones Racing	Ford Falcon (BF)	49	+ 1 lap	28	
27	34	(Australia) Dean Canto	Garry Rogers Motorsport	Holden Commodore (VE)	49	+ 1 lap	23	
28	26	(Australia) Alan Gurr	Britek Motorsport	Ford Falcon (BF)	45	+ 4 laps	29	
Ret	111	(Australia) John Bowe	Paul Cruickshank Racing	Ford Falcon (BF)	45	Accident	27	
Ret	22	(Australia) Todd Kelly	Holden Racing Team	Holden Commodore (VE)	37	Brakes	5	
DNS	25	(Australia) Jason Bright	Britek Motorsport	Ford Falcon (BF)		Did not start		
Fastest Lap: Garth Tander (HSV Dealer Team) - 0:57.4237 on lap 46

=== Race 2 results ===
Pos	No	Name	Team	Laps	Time/Retired	Grid	Points
1	16	Garth Tander	Toll HSV Dealer Team	50	52:22.0384	1	24
2	1	Rick Kelly	Toll HSV Dealer Team	50	+1.066sec	2	20
3	2	Mark Skaife	Holden Racing Team	50	+1.4294sec	3	17
4	17	Steven Johnson	Jim Beam Racing	50	+4.4689sec	5	15
5	18	Will Davison	Jim Beam Racing	50	+5.2199sec	6	13
6	5	Mark Winterbottom	Ford Performance Racing	50	+6.0923sec	12	12
7	51	Greg Murphy	Tasman Motorsport	50	+6.3009sec	8	11
8	888	Craig Lowndes	Team Vodafone	50	+7.1776sec	4	10
9	33	Lee Holdsworth	Garry Rogers Motorsport	50	+7.3900sec	10	9
10	22	Todd Kelly	Holden Racing Team	50	+7.5631sec	30	8
11	021	Paul Radisich	Team Kiwi Racing	50	+8.3797sec	19	6
12	3	Jason Richards	Tasman Motorsport	50	+8.8062sec	16	5
13	5	Steven Richards	Ford Performance Racing	50	+9.089sec	9	4
14	9	Russell Ingall	Stone Brothers Racing	50	+9.5472sec	18	3
15	39	Fabian Coulthard	Team Sirromet Wines	50	+10.2393sec	20	2
16	7	Shane Price	Jack Daniel's Racing	50	+10.8531sec	15	
17	20	Paul Dumbrell	Supercheap Auto Racing	50	+11.1693sec	21	
18	8	Max Wilson	WPS Racing	50	+11.4272sec	11	
19	67	Paul Morris	Team Sirromet Wines	50	+11.7709sec	17	
20	111	John Bowe	Glenfords Racing	50	+11.9025sec	29	
21	26	Alan Gurr	Irwin Racing	50	+12.5465sec	28	
22	10	Jason Bargwanna	WPS Racing	50	+12.6616sec	25	
23	88	Jamie Whincup	Team Vodafone	50	+13.0116sec	7	
24	50	Cameron McConville	Supercheap Auto Racing	50	+13.2679sec	22	
25	34	Dean Canto	Garry Rogers Motorsport	49	+1 lap	27	
26	11	Jack Perkins	Jack Daniel's Racing	49	+1 lap	24	
27	14	Brad Jones	Team BOC	49	+1 lap	23	
28	12	Andrew Jones	Team BOC	49	+1 lap	26	
DNF	4	James Courtney	Stone Brothers Racing	42	Engine	13	
DNF	55	Steve Owen	Autobarn Racing	42	Accident	14	
DNS	25	Jason Bright	Fujitsu Racing				

=== Race 3 results ===
Pos	No	Name	Team	Laps	Time/Retired	Grid	Points
1	16	Garth Tander	Toll HSV Dealer Team	50	52:25.6340	1	24
2	2	Mark Skaife	Holden Racing Team	50	+0.6188sec	3	20
3	1	Rick Kelly	Toll HSV Dealer Team	50	+10.3304sec	2	17
4	17	Steven Johnson	Jim Beam Racing	50	+10.5142sec	4	15
5	5	Mark Winterbottom	Ford Performance Racing	50	+13.4652sec	6	13
6	18	Will Davison	Jim Beam Racing	50	+13.7493sec	5	12
7	22	Todd Kelly	Holden Racing Team	50	+13.9252sec	10	11
8	888	Craig Lowndes	Team Vodafone	50	+14.1343sec	8	10
9	6	Steven Richards	Ford Performance Racing	50	+14.4642sec	13	9
10	4	Russell Ingall	Stone Brothers Racing	50	+16.6701sec	14	8
11	33	Lee Holdsworth	Garry Rogers Motorsport	50	+20.7623sec	9	6
12	51	Greg Murphy	Tasman Motorsport	50	+21.4516sec	7	5
13	8	Max Wilson	WPS Racing	50	+23.2679sec	18	4
14	111	John Bowe	Glenfords Racing	50	+23.5954sec	20	3
15	67	Paul Morris	Team Sirromet Wines	50	+24.4327sec	19	2
16	50	Cameron McConville	Supercheap Auto Racing	50	+25.4782sec	24	
17	39	Fabian Coulthard	Team Sirromet Wines	50	+26.1079sec	15	
18	88	Jamie Whincup	Team Vodafone	50	+26.4622sec	23	
19	3	Jason Richards	Tasman Motorsport	50	+27.1296sec	12	
20	7	Shane Price	Jack Daniel's Racing	50	+27.5134sec	16	
21	12	Andrew Jones	Team BOC	50	+28.5265sec	28	
22	021	Paul Radisich	Team Kiwi Racing	50	+30.2884sec	11	
23	10	Jason Bargwanna	WPS Racing	50	+30.7163sec	22	
24	55	Steve Owen	Autobarn Racing	50	+31.4202sec	30	
25	11	Jack Perkins	Jack Daniel's Racing	50	+31.9292sec	26	
26	14	Brad Jones	Team BOC	50	+31.6301sec	27	
27	26	Alan Gurr	Irwin Racing	50	+41.525sec	21	
28	34	Dean Canto	Garry Rogers Motorsport	49	+1 lap	25	
DNF	4	James Courtney	Stone Brothers Racing	28	Accident	29	
DNF	20	Paul Dumbrell	Supercheap Auto Racing	7		17	
DNS	25	Jason Bright	Fujitsu Racing				

== In-Car Camera Coverage ==
The six cars carrying cameras at this round were those of Rick Kelly, Mark Skaife, Russell Ingall, Jamie Whincup, Max Wilson and Paul Dumbrell.
