= 2007 Darwin Triple Crown =

2007 Supercar Championship event

(Northern Territory) 2007 Skycity Triple Crown
Event Information
- Round 6 of 14 in the 2007 V8 Supercar Championship Series
- Date: 22–24 June 2007
- Location: Darwin, Northern Territory
- Venue: Hidden Valley Raceway
- Weather: Fine

Results
Race 1
Distance	42 laps	120 km
Pole position	Rick Kelly; HSV Dealer Team	1:09.4539
Winner	Mark Skaife; Holden Racing Team	56:15.2338
Race 2
Distance	42 laps	120 km
Winner	Craig Lowndes; Triple Eight Race Engineering	56:15.5500
Race 3
Distance	42 laps	120 km
Winner	Craig Lowndes; Triple Eight Race Engineering	54:26.3310
Round Results
First	Craig Lowndes; Triple Eight Race Engineering	65 pts
Second	Rick Kelly; HSV Dealer Team	60 pts
Third	Mark Skaife; Holden Racing Team	50 pts

The 2007 Darwin Triple Crown (known for naming rights reasons as the 2007 SkyCity Triple Crown) was the sixth round of the 2007 V8 Supercar Championship Series. It took place on the weekend of 22 to 24 June at Hidden Valley Raceway in Darwin, Northern Territory.

Craig Lowndes claimed his first round win of the year after winning two out of the three races throughout the weekend. The first race was won by previous round victor, Mark Skaife. That race plagued by a five-car incident at the start of the race which resulted in Will Davison being excluded from the results.

Rick Kelly continued his remarkable run of strong, consistent results to further establish his lead in the drivers standings over teammate Garth Tander heading into the next round in Queensland.

== Background ==
=== Entry list ===
There were 30 drivers entered for this round with no alterations to the entry list from the previous round.

== Race report ==
=== Qualifying ===
Pos	No	Name	Team	Vehicle	Time
1	1	(Australia) Rick Kelly	HSV Dealer Team	Holden Commodore (VE)	1:09.4539
2	22	(Australia) Todd Kelly	Holden Racing Team	Holden Commodore (VE)	1:09.5129
3	2	(Australia) Mark Skaife	Holden Racing Team	Holden Commodore (VE)	1:09.5624
4	18	(Australia) Will Davison	Dick Johnson Racing	Ford Falcon (BF)	1:09.6016
5	88	(Australia) Jamie Whincup	Triple Eight Race Engineering	Ford Falcon (BF)	1:09.6153
6	6	(New Zealand) Steven Richards	Ford Performance Racing	Ford Falcon (BF)	1:09.6758
7	5	(Australia) Mark Winterbottom	Ford Performance Racing	Ford Falcon (BF)	1:09.8205
8	888	(Australia) Craig Lowndes	Triple Eight Race Engineering	Ford Falcon (BF)	1:09.8439
9	16	(Australia) Garth Tander	HSV Dealer Team	Holden Commodore (VE)	1:09.8936
10	3	(New Zealand) Jason Richards	Tasman Motorsport	Holden Commodore (VE)	1:09.8966
11	4	(Australia) James Courtney	Stone Brothers Racing	Ford Falcon (BF)	1:10.0838
12	25	(Australia) Jason Bright	Britek Motorsport	Ford Falcon (BF)	1:10.1018
13	17	(Australia) Steven Johnson	Dick Johnson Racing	Ford Falcon (BF)	1:10.1481
14	51	(New Zealand) Greg Murphy	Tasman Motorsport	Holden Commodore (VE)	1:10.2224
15	9	(Australia) Russell Ingall	Stone Brothers Racing	Ford Falcon (BF)	1:10.2891
16	10	(Australia) Jason Bargwanna	WPS Racing	Ford Falcon (BF)	1:10.4101
17	34	(Australia) Dean Canto	Garry Rogers Motorsport	Holden Commodore (VE)	1:10.4361
18	33	(Australia) Lee Holdsworth	Garry Rogers Motorsport	Holden Commodore (VZ)	1:10.5245
19	50	(Australia) Cameron McConville	Paul Weel Racing	Holden Commodore (VZ)	1:10.5910
20	8	(Brazil) Max Wilson	WPS Racing	Ford Falcon (BF)	1:10.6171
21	55	(Australia) Steve Owen	Rod Nash Racing	Holden Commodore (VE)	1:10.7239
22	12	(Australia) Andrew Jones	Brad Jones Racing	Ford Falcon (BF)	1:10.7395
23	20	(Australia) Paul Dumbrell	Paul Weel Racing	Holden Commodore (VE)	1:10.7445
24	67	(Australia) Paul Morris	Paul Morris Motorsport	Holden Commodore (VE)	1:10.8961
25	39	(New Zealand) Fabian Coulthard	Paul Morris Motorsport	Holden Commodore (VZ)	1:10.9274
26	111	(Australia) John Bowe	Paul Cruickshank Racing	Ford Falcon (BF)	1:11.0167
27	11	(Australia) Jack Perkins	Perkins Engineering	Holden Commodore (VE)	1:11.0176
28	14	(New Zealand) Simon Wills	Brad Jones Racing	Ford Falcon (BF)	1:11.0350
29	7	(Australia) Shane Price	Perkins Engineering	Holden Commodore (VE)	1:11.2089
30	26	(Australia) Alan Gurr	Britek Motorsport	Ford Falcon (BF)	1:11.4195

=== Race 1 ===
Pos	No	Driver	Team	Car	Laps	Time/Retired	Grid
1	2	(Australia) Mark Skaife	Holden Racing Team	Holden Commodore (VE)	42	56:15.2338	3
2	1	(Australia) Rick Kelly	HSV Dealer Team	Holden Commodore (VE)	42	+	
3	888	(Australia) Craig Lowndes	Triple Eight Race Engineering	Ford Falcon (BF)	42	+	
4	22	(Australia) Todd Kelly	Holden Racing Team	Holden Commodore (VE)	42	+	
5	88	(Australia) Jamie Whincup	Triple Eight Race Engineering	Ford Falcon (BF)	42	+	
6	16	(Australia) Garth Tander	HSV Dealer Team	Holden Commodore (VE)	42	+	
7	6	(New Zealand) Steven Richards	Ford Performance Racing	Ford Falcon (BF)	42	+	
8	8	(Brazil) Max Wilson	WPS Racing	Ford Falcon (BF)	42	+	
9	34	(Australia) Dean Canto	Garry Rogers Motorsport	Holden Commodore (VE)	42	+	
10	3	(New Zealand) Jason Richards	Tasman Motorsport	Holden Commodore (VE)	42	+	
11	17	(Australia) Steven Johnson	Dick Johnson Racing	Ford Falcon (BF)	42	+	
12	67	(Australia) Paul Morris	Paul Morris Motorsport	Holden Commodore (VE)	42	+	
13	55	(Australia) Steve Owen	Rod Nash Racing	Holden Commodore (VZ)	42	+	
14	33	(Australia) Lee Holdsworth	Garry Rogers Motorsport	Holden Commodore (VZ)	42	+	
15	111	(Australia) John Bowe	Paul Cruickshank Racing	Ford Falcon (BF)	42	+	
16	4	(Australia) James Courtney	Stone Brothers Racing	Holden Commodore (VE)	42	+	
17	14	(New Zealand) Simon Wills	Brad Jones Racing	Ford Falcon (BF)	42	+	
18	12	(Australia) Andrew Jones	Brad Jones Racing	Ford Falcon (BF)	42	+	
19	7	(Australia) Shane Price	Perkins Engineering	Holden Commodore (VE)	42	+	
20	50	(Australia) Cameron McConville	Paul Weel Racing	Holden Commodore (VZ)	42	+	
21	11	(Australia) Jack Perkins	Perkins Engineering	Holden Commodore (VE)	42	+	
22	39	(New Zealand) Fabian Coulthard	Paul Morris Motorsport	Holden Commodore (VZ)	42	+	
23	26	(Australia) Alan Gurr	Britek Motorsport	Ford Falcon (BF)	42	+	
24	20	(Australia) Paul Dumbrell	Paul Weel Racing	Holden Commodore (VE)	42	+	
Ret	51	(New Zealand) Greg Murphy	Tasman Motorsport	Holden Commodore (VE)	8	Retired	
Ret	5	(Australia) Mark Winterbottom	Ford Performance Racing	Ford Falcon (BF)	0	Retired	
Ret	9	(Australia) Russell Ingall	Stone Brothers Racing	Ford Falcon (BF)	0	Retired	
Ret	10	(Australia) Jason Bargwanna	WPS Racing	Ford Falcon (BF)	0	Retired	
Ret	25	(Australia) Jason Bright	Britek Motorsport	Ford Falcon (BF)	0	Retired	
EXC	18	(Australia) Will Davison	Dick Johnson Racing	Ford Falcon (BF)		Disqualified	
Fastest Lap: Todd Kelly (Holden Racing Team) - 1:10.5528 on lap 12

=== Race 2 ===
Pos	No	Driver	Team	Car	Laps	Time/Retired	Grid
1	2	(Australia) Mark Skaife	Holden Racing Team	Holden Commodore (VE)	42	56:15.2338	
1	888	(Australia) Craig Lowndes	Triple Eight Race Engineering	Ford Falcon (BF)	42	+	
2	1	(Australia) Rick Kelly	HSV Dealer Team	Holden Commodore (VE)	42	+	
3	16	(Australia) Garth Tander	HSV Dealer Team	Holden Commodore (VE)	42	+	
4	88	(Australia) Jamie Whincup	Triple Eight Race Engineering	Ford Falcon (BF)	42	+	
6	5	(Australia) Mark Winterbottom	Ford Performance Racing	Ford Falcon (BF)	42	+	
7	18	(Australia) Will Davison	Dick Johnson Racing	Ford Falcon (BF)	42	+	
8	22	(Australia) Todd Kelly	Holden Racing Team	Holden Commodore (VE)	42	+	
9	6	(New Zealand) Steven Richards	Ford Performance Racing	Ford Falcon (BF)	42	+	
10	3	(New Zealand) Jason Richards	Tasman Motorsport	Holden Commodore (VE)	42	+	
11	34	(Australia) Dean Canto	Garry Rogers Motorsport	Holden Commodore (VE)	42	+	
12	55	(Australia) Steve Owen	Rod Nash Racing	Holden Commodore (VZ)	42	+	
13	67	(Australia) Paul Morris	Paul Morris Motorsport	Holden Commodore (VE)	42	+	
14	8	(Brazil) Max Wilson	WPS Racing	Ford Falcon (BF)	42	+	
15	111	(Australia) John Bowe	Paul Cruickshank Racing	Ford Falcon (BF)	42	+	
16	10	(Australia) Jason Bargwanna	WPS Racing	Ford Falcon (BF)	42	+	
17	33	(Australia) Lee Holdsworth	Garry Rogers Motorsport	Holden Commodore (VZ)	42	+	
18	26	(Australia) Alan Gurr	Britek Motorsport	Ford Falcon (BF)	42	+	
19	50	(Australia) Cameron McConville	Paul Weel Racing	Holden Commodore (VZ)	42	+	
20	14	(New Zealand) Simon Wills	Brad Jones Racing	Ford Falcon (BF)	42	+	
21	20	(Australia) Paul Dumbrell	Paul Weel Racing	Holden Commodore (VE)	42	+	
22	39	(New Zealand) Fabian Coulthard	Paul Morris Motorsport	Holden Commodore (VZ)	42	+	
23	17	(Australia) Steven Johnson	Dick Johnson Racing	Ford Falcon (BF)	42	+	
24	11	(Australia) Jack Perkins	Perkins Engineering	Holden Commodore (VE)	42	+	
25	12	(Australia) Andrew Jones	Brad Jones Racing	Ford Falcon (BF)	41	+	
Ret	51	(New Zealand) Greg Murphy	Tasman Motorsport	Holden Commodore (VE)	25	+	
Ret	25	(Australia) Jason Bright	Britek Motorsport	Ford Falcon (BF)	20	+	
Ret	9	(Australia) Russell Ingall	Stone Brothers Racing	Ford Falcon (BF)	16	+	
Ret	4	(Australia) James Courtney	Stone Brothers Racing	Holden Commodore (VE)	0	+	
Ret	7	(Australia) Shane Price	Perkins Engineering	Holden Commodore (VE)	0	+	
Fastest Lap: Garth Tander (HSV Dealer Team) - 1:10.5091 on lap 8

=== Race 3 ===
Pos	No	Driver	Team	Car	Laps	Time/Retired	Grid
1	888	(Australia) Craig Lowndes	Triple Eight Race Engineering	Ford Falcon (BF)	42	54:26.3310	
2	1	(Australia) Rick Kelly	HSV Dealer Team	Holden Commodore (VE)	42	+	
3	16	(Australia) Garth Tander	HSV Dealer Team	Holden Commodore (VE)	42	+	
4	22	(Australia) Todd Kelly	Holden Racing Team	Holden Commodore (VE)	42	+	
5	2	(Australia) Mark Skaife	Holden Racing Team	Holden Commodore (VE)	42		
6	5	(Australia) Mark Winterbottom	Ford Performance Racing	Ford Falcon (BF)	42	+	
7	18	(Australia) Will Davison	Dick Johnson Racing	Ford Falcon (BF)	42	+	
8	6	(New Zealand) Steven Richards	Ford Performance Racing	Ford Falcon (BF)	42	+	
9	3	(New Zealand) Jason Richards	Tasman Motorsport	Holden Commodore (VE)	42	+	
10	33	(Australia) Lee Holdsworth	Garry Rogers Motorsport	Holden Commodore (VZ)	42	+	
11	9	(Australia) Russell Ingall	Stone Brothers Racing	Ford Falcon (BF)	42	+	
12	67	(Australia) Paul Morris	Paul Morris Motorsport	Holden Commodore (VE)	42	+	
13	10	(Australia) Jason Bargwanna	WPS Racing	Ford Falcon (BF)	42	+	
14	51	(New Zealand) Greg Murphy	Tasman Motorsport	Holden Commodore (VE)	42	+	
15	34	(Australia) Dean Canto	Garry Rogers Motorsport	Holden Commodore (VE)	42	+	
16	8	(Brazil) Max Wilson	WPS Racing	Ford Falcon (BF)	42	+	
17	20	(Australia) Paul Dumbrell	Paul Weel Racing	Holden Commodore (VE)	42	+	
18	17	(Australia) Steven Johnson	Dick Johnson Racing	Ford Falcon (BF)	42	+	
19	55	(Australia) Steve Owen	Rod Nash Racing	Holden Commodore (VZ)	42	+	
20	50	(Australia) Cameron McConville	Paul Weel Racing	Holden Commodore (VZ)	42	+	
21	11	(Australia) Jack Perkins	Perkins Engineering	Holden Commodore (VE)	42	+	
22	14	(New Zealand) Simon Wills	Brad Jones Racing	Ford Falcon (BF)	42	+	
23	12	(Australia) Andrew Jones	Brad Jones Racing	Ford Falcon (BF)	42	+	
24	111	(Australia) John Bowe	Paul Cruickshank Racing	Ford Falcon (BF)	41	+	
25	39	(New Zealand) Fabian Coulthard	Paul Morris Motorsport	Holden Commodore (VZ)	41	+ 1 lap	
26	88	(Australia) Jamie Whincup	Triple Eight Race Engineering	Ford Falcon (BF)	37	+ 5 laps	
Ret	26	(Australia) Alan Gurr	Britek Motorsport	Ford Falcon (BF)	17	Retired	
Ret	25	(Australia) Jason Bright	Britek Motorsport	Ford Falcon (BF)	0	Retired	
DNS	4	(Australia) James Courtney	Stone Brothers Racing	Holden Commodore (VE)	0	Did not start	
DNS	7	(Australia) Shane Price	Perkins Engineering	Holden Commodore (VE)	0	Did not start	
Fastest Lap: Craig Lowndes (Triple Eight Race Engineering) - 1:10.5819 on lap 13
