= 2008 Sandown 400 =

2008 Supercar Championship event

(Victoria (state)) 2008 Midas 400
Event Information
- Round 5 of 14 in the 2008 V8 Supercar Championship Series
- Date: 7–9 June 2008
- Location: Melbourne, Victoria
- Venue: Sandown International Raceway
- Weather: Fine

Results
Race 1
Distance	39 laps	120 km
Pole position	Jamie Whincup; Triple Eight Race Engineering	1:09.6987
Winner	Jamie Whincup; Triple Eight Race Engineering	47:18.7876
Race 2
Distance	39 laps	120 km
Winner	Craig Lowndes; Triple Eight Race Engineering	56:19.9593
Race 3
Distance	39 laps	120 km
Winner	Jamie Whincup; Triple Eight Race Engineering	47:20.7150
Round Results
First	Jamie Whincup; Triple Eight Race Engineering	286 pts
Second	Mark Winterbottom; Ford Performance Racing	252 pts
Third	James Courtney; Stone Brothers Racing	234 pts

The 2008 Midas 400 was the fifth round of the 2008 V8 Supercar season. It was held on the weekend of 7 to 9 June Sandown Raceway in Melbourne, Victoria. With most states of Australia celebrating a public holiday on the Monday celebrating the Queen's birthday, the meeting took the unusual format of Saturday-Monday instead of Friday-Sunday.

== Practice ==
Qualifying was held on Saturday 7 June. Following on from the Eastern Creek round of the series, a 'rookie' practice session was held, allowing younger and newer drivers to gain additional testing laps. Teams were also allowed to use the session to test their co-drivers who will step into the teams for the Phillip Island 500 and Bathurst 1000 races later in the season which require two drivers per car. Of the enduro co-drivers, Steve Owen was fastest driving for Jim Beam Racing. Paul Radisich (HSV Dealer Team) was second fastest ahead of Jason Bargwanna (Rod Nash Racing). Other co-drivers to take part, in order were John McIntyre (Glenfords Racing), Warren Luff (Jim Beam Racing), Dean Canto (Ford Performance Racing), Craig Baird and Glenn Seton (both Holden Racing Team), David Besnard (Stone Brothers Racing), Greg Ritter (Garry Rogers Motorsport), Dale Wood (Tasman Motorsport), Paul Weel (Paul Weel Racing), Nathan Pretty (Jack Daniel's Racing), Brad Jones (Brad Jones Racing), Jack Perkins (Jack Daniel's Racing), Luke Youlden (Ford Performance Racing) and Grant Denyer (Ford Rising Stars Racing).

Fastest driver of the day was Garth Tander, the only driver to lap faster than Owen. James Courtney, Mark Winterbottom and Jamie Whincup were the only drivers within a tenth of Owen's best lap.

== Qualifying ==
Qualifying was held on Sunday 8 June. Jamie Whincup slammed home pole position in the final moments of qualifying, some four-tenths clear of the field. Mark Winterbottom was second fastest, leading Will Davison and leading Holden, Rick Kelly by only a few hundredths of a second. Fabian Coulthard had a best ever qualifying result to be fifth fastest with Russell Ingall also well up in sixth, 19 grid spots ahead of his teammate. Handling issues slowed the Holden Racing Team, both Garth Tander and Mark Skaife missing the cut for the top ten.

== Race 1 ==
Race 1 was held on Sunday 8 June. Steven Richards and Todd Kelly tangled on the opening lap, Greg Murphy spun on the second lap, all three dropping to the tail of the field. Andrew Thompson spun Marcus Marshall around at the top of the straight. Will Davison retired from the race in the early running with an engine problem, spoiling the good work from qualifying. Craig Lowndes damaged his car trying to get past Davison. Rick Kelly had lurid 160 km/h spin in the Esses without hitting the walls or the cars in close company, only losing three spots.

As the race settled Whincup pulled further and further away, only Winterbottom was able to hang on to finish second. Craig Lowndes fought his way into third position. Russell Ingall took his best finish of the season to finish top Holden in fourth ahead of Garth Tander, recovering from a poor grid position. Coulthard finished eighth, capitalising on his qualifying performance. Shane van Gisbergen finished an excellent ninth.

== Race 2 ==
Race 2 was held on Monday 9 June.

== Race 3 ==
Race 3 was held on Monday 9 June.

== Results ==
Results as follows:

=== Qualifying ===
Pos	No	Name	Car	Team	Part 3	Part 2	Part 1
1	88	(Australia) Jamie Whincup	Ford BF Falcon	Triple Eight Race Engineering	1:09.6987		
2	5	(Australia) Mark Winterbottom	Ford BF Falcon	Ford Performance Racing	1:10.0184		
3	18	(Australia) Will Davison	Ford BF Falcon	Dick Johnson Racing	1:10.0328		
4	15	(Australia) Rick Kelly	Holden VE Commodore	HSV Dealer Team	1:10.0588		
5	111	(New Zealand) Fabian Coulthard	Ford BF Falcon	Paul Cruickshank Racing	1:10.0800		
6	39	(Australia) Russell Ingall	Holden VE Commodore	Paul Morris Motorsport	1:10.1399		
7	6	(New Zealand) Steven Richards	Ford BF Falcon	Ford Performance Racing	1:10.1750		
8	7	(Australia) Todd Kelly	Holden VE Commodore	Perkins Engineering	1:10.1754		
9	888	(Australia) Craig Lowndes	Ford BF Falcon	Triple Eight Race Engineering	1:10.2646		
10	3	(New Zealand) Jason Richards	Holden VE Commodore	Tasman Motorsport	1:10.5183		
11	4	(Australia) James Courtney	Ford BF Falcon	Stone Brothers Racing		1:10.3794	
12	1	(Australia) Garth Tander	Holden VE Commodore	Holden Racing Team		1:10.4050	
13	2	(Australia) Mark Skaife	Holden VE Commodore	Holden Racing Team		1:10.4187	
14	33	(Australia) Lee Holdsworth	Holden VE Commodore	Garry Rogers Motorsport		1:10.4387	
15	16	(Australia) Paul Dumbrell	Holden VE Commodore	HSV Dealer Team		1:10.4769	
16	17	(Australia) Steven Johnson	Ford BF Falcon	Dick Johnson Racing		1:10.6166	
17	9	(New Zealand) Shane van Gisbergen	Ford BF Falcon	Stone Brothers Racing		1:10.6738	
18	50	(Australia) Andrew Thompson	Holden VE Commodore	Paul Weel Racing		1:10.7576	
19	51	(New Zealand) Greg Murphy	Holden VE Commodore	Tasman Motorsport		1:10.8247	
20	55	(Australia) Tony D'Alberto	Holden VE Commodore	Rod Nash Racing		1:10.9508	
21	12	(Australia) Andrew Jones	Holden VE Commodore	Brad Jones Racing			1:10.9803
22	11	(Australia) Shane Price	Holden VE Commodore	Perkins Engineering			1:11.0068
23	34	(Australia) Michael Caruso	Holden VE Commodore	Garry Rogers Motorsport			1:11.0287
24	14	(Australia) Cameron McConville	Holden VE Commodore	Brad Jones Racing			1:11.0451
25	67	(Australia) Paul Morris	Holden VE Commodore	Paul Morris Motorsport			1:11.0718
26	26	(Australia) Marcus Marshall	Ford BF Falcon	Britek Motorsport			1:11.4351
27	021	(New Zealand) Kayne Scott	Ford BF Falcon	Team Kiwi Racing			1:11.6500
28	25	(Australia) Jason Bright	Ford BF Falcon	Britek Motorsport			1:11.6990
29	777	(Australia) Michael Patrizi	Ford BF Falcon	Ford Rising Stars Racing			1:12.2580

=== Race 1 results ===
Pos	No	Name	Team	Laps	Time/Retired	Grid	Points
1	88	Jamie Whincup	Team Vodafone	39	47:18.7876	1	100
2	5	Mark Winterbottom	Ford Performance Racing	39	+3.2s	2	92
3	888	Craig Lowndes	Team Vodafone	39	+11.6s	9	86
4	39	Russell Ingall	Supercheap Auto Racing	39	+15.7s	6	80
5	1	Garth Tander	Holden Racing Team	39	+17.8s	12	74
6	4	James Courtney	Stone Brothers Racing	39	+18.2s	11	68
7	15	Rick Kelly	HSV Dealer Team	39	+24.1s	4	64
8	111	Fabian Coulthard	Glenfords Racing	39	+24.5s	5	60
9	9	Shane van Gisbergen	Stone Brothers Racing	39	+30.0s	17	56
10	2	Mark Skaife	Holden Racing Team	39	+31.0s	13	52
11	33	Lee Holdsworth	Garry Rogers Motorsport	39	+31.4s	14	48
12	16	Paul Dumbrell	HSV Dealer Team	39	+31.9s	15	46
13	17	Steven Johnson	Jim Beam Racing	39	+32.2s	16	44
14	14	Cameron McConville	Brad Jones Racing	39	+32.8s	24	42
15	67	Paul Morris	Team Sirromet Wines	39	+38.2s	25	40
16	12	Andrew Jones	Brad Jones Racing	39	+43.9s	18	38
17	7	Todd Kelly	Jack Daniel's Racing	39	+44.2s	8	36
18	3	Jason Richards	Tasman Motorsport	39	+45.1s	10	34
19	11	Shane Price	Jack Daniel's Racing	39	+48.8s	22	32
20	34	Michael Caruso	Garry Rogers Motorsport	39	+52.8s	23	30
21	021	Kayne Scott	Team Kiwi Racing	39	+63.8s	27	28
22	51	Greg Murphy	Tasman Motorsport	39	+64.7s	19	26
23	6	Steven Richards	Ford Performance Racing	39	+64.7s	7	24
24	50	Andrew Thompson	Paul Weel Racing	39	+96.9s	18	22
25	55	Tony D'Alberto	Rod Nash Racing	30	+ 9 laps	20	20
DNF	25	Jason Bright	Britek Motorsport	11		28	
DNF	777	Michael Patrizi	Ford Rising Stars Racing	9		29	
DNF	18	Will Davison	Jim Beam Racing	7	Engine	3	
DNF	26	Marcus Marshall	Britek Motorsport	6		26	

=== Race 2 results ===
Pos	No	Name	Team	Laps	Time/Retired	Grid	Points
1	888	Craig Lowndes	Team Vodafone	39	56:19.9593	3	100
2	9	Shane van Gisbergen	Stone Brothers Racing	39	+2.4s	9	92
3	88	Jamie Whincup	Team Vodafone	39	+2.9s	1	86
4	4	James Courtney	Stone Brothers Racing	39	+4.7s	6	80
5	17	Steven Johnson	Jim Beam Racing	39	+4.8s	13	74
6	5	Mark Winterbottom	Ford Performance Racing	39	+6.1s	2	68
7	39	Russell Ingall	Supercheap Auto Racing	39	+8.5s	4	64
8	7	Todd Kelly	Jack Daniel's Racing	39	+9.3s	17	60
9	1	Garth Tander	Holden Racing Team	39	+10.0s	5	56
10	14	Cameron McConville	Brad Jones Racing	39	+13.6s	14	52
11	18	Will Davison	Jim Beam Racing	39	+14.6s	28	48
12	15	Rick Kelly	HSV Dealer Team	39	+16.0s	7	46
13	16	Paul Dumbrell	HSV Dealer Team	39	+19.8s	12	44
14	111	Fabian Coulthard	Glenfords Racing	39	+21.1s	8	42
15	25	Jason Bright	Britek Motorsport	39	+22.0s	26	40
16	6	Steven Richards	Ford Performance Racing	39	+23.1s	23	38
17	12	Andrew Jones	Brad Jones Racing	39	+23.9s	16	36
18	2	Mark Skaife	Holden Racing Team	39	+28.6s	10	34
19	11	Shane Price	Jack Daniel's Racing	39	+29.0s	19	32
20	3	Jason Richards	Tasman Motorsport	39	+59.3s	18	30
21	67	Paul Morris	Team Sirromet Wines	39	+79.7s	16	28
22	33	Lee Holdsworth	Garry Rogers Motorsport	38	+ 1 lap	11	26
23	34	Michael Caruso	Garry Rogers Motorsport	38	+ 1 lap	20	24
24	26	Marcus Marshall	Britek Motorsport	38	+ 1 lap	29	22
25	55	Tony D'Alberto	Rod Nash Racing	38	+ 1 lap	25	20
26	51	Greg Murphy	Tasman Motorsport	38	+ 1 lap	22	18
27	50	Andrew Thompson	Paul Weel Racing	38	+ 1 lap	24	16
28	021	Kayne Scott	Team Kiwi Racing	37	+ 2 laps	21	14
DSQ	777	Michael Patrizi	Ford Rising Stars Racing			27	

=== Race 3 results ===
Pos	No	Name	Team	Laps	Time/Retired	Grid	Points
1	88	Jamie Whincup	Team Vodafone	39	47:20.7150	3	100
2	5	Mark Winterbottom	Ford Performance Racing	39	+2.1s	6	92
3	4	James Courtney	Stone Brothers Racing	39	+6.8s	4	86
4	9	Shane van Gisbergen	Stone Brothers Racing	39	+18.0s	2	80
5	7	Todd Kelly	Jack Daniel's Racing	39	+18.4s	8	74
6	39	Russell Ingall	Supercheap Auto Racing	39	+18.9s	7	68
7	18	Will Davison	Jim Beam Racing	39	+19.2s	11	64
8	33	Lee Holdsworth	Garry Rogers Motorsport	39	+20.5s	22	60
9	6	Steven Richards	Ford Performance Racing	39	+20.9s	16	56
10	17	Steven Johnson	Jim Beam Racing	39	+31.9s	5	52
11	51	Greg Murphy	Tasman Motorsport	39	+32.2s	26	48
12	1	Garth Tander	Holden Racing Team	39	+32.7s	9	46
13	14	Cameron McConville	Brad Jones Racing	39	+41.1s	10	44
14	25	Jason Bright	Britek Motorsport	39	+53.8s	15	42
15	12	Andrew Jones	Brad Jones Racing	39	+54.9s	17	40
16	3	Jason Richards	Tasman Motorsport	39	+55.5s	20	38
17	15	Rick Kelly	HSV Dealer Team	39	+55.7s	12	36
18	11	Shane Price	Jack Daniel's Racing	39	+56.3s	19	34
19	34	Michael Caruso	Garry Rogers Motorsport	39	+56.8s	23	32
20	50	Andrew Thompson	Paul Weel Racing	39	+67.5s	27	30
21	26	Marcus Marshall	Britek Motorsport	39	+73.0s	24	28
22	2	Mark Skaife	Holden Racing Team	39	+73.4s	18	26
23	021	Kayne Scott	Team Kiwi Racing	39	+73.4s	28	24
24	67	Paul Morris	Team Sirromet Wines	38	+ 1 lap	21	22
25	55	Tony D'Alberto	Rod Nash Racing	38	+ 1 lap	25	20
26	777	Michael Patrizi	Ford Rising Stars Racing	38	+ 1 lap	29	18
27	16	Paul Dumbrell	HSV Dealer Team	36	+ 3 laps	13	16
DNF	111	Fabian Coulthard	Glenfords Racing	21		14	
DNS	888	Craig Lowndes	Team Vodafone	0	Rear Axle	1	

== Standings ==
After round 5 of 14.

Pos	No	Name	Team	Points
1	5	Mark Winterbottom	Ford Performance Racing	1124
2	1	Garth Tander	Holden Racing Team	1072
3	88	Jamie Whincup	Team Vodafone	1062
4	15	Rick Kelly	HSV Dealer Team	1028
5	888	Craig Lowndes	Team Vodafone	897

== Support categories ==
The 2008 Midas 400 had four support categories.

Category	Round winner
Fujitsu V8 Supercar Series	Steve Owen (Holden VZ Commodore)
Carrera Cup	Craig Baird (Porsche 997 GT3 Cup)
Formula Ford	Paul Laskazeski (Spectrum 011b Ford)
Mini Challenge Australia	Jason Bargwanna (Mini Cooper S)
