= Stone Brothers Racing =

Former racing team

- Team Principal: Ross Stone; Jim Stone
- Debut: 1998
- Final Season: 2012
- Round wins: 23
- Pole positions: 27
- 2012 position: 3rd (4743 points)

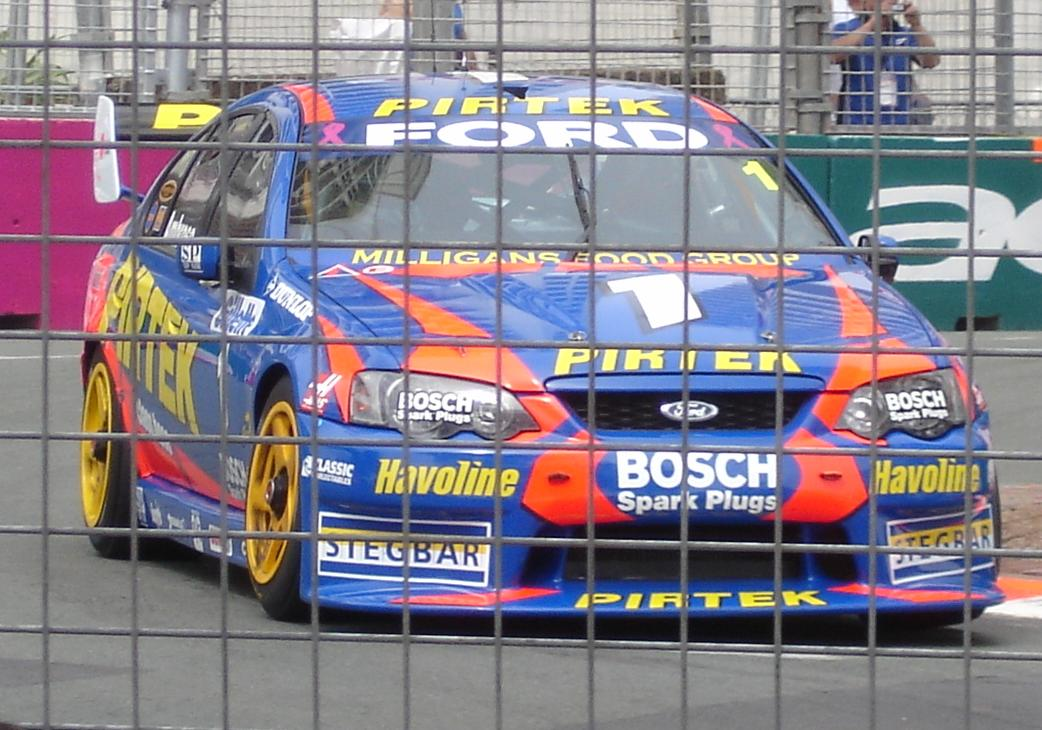
Marcos Ambrose' Ford BA Falcon at the Surfers Paradise Street Circuit in 2005

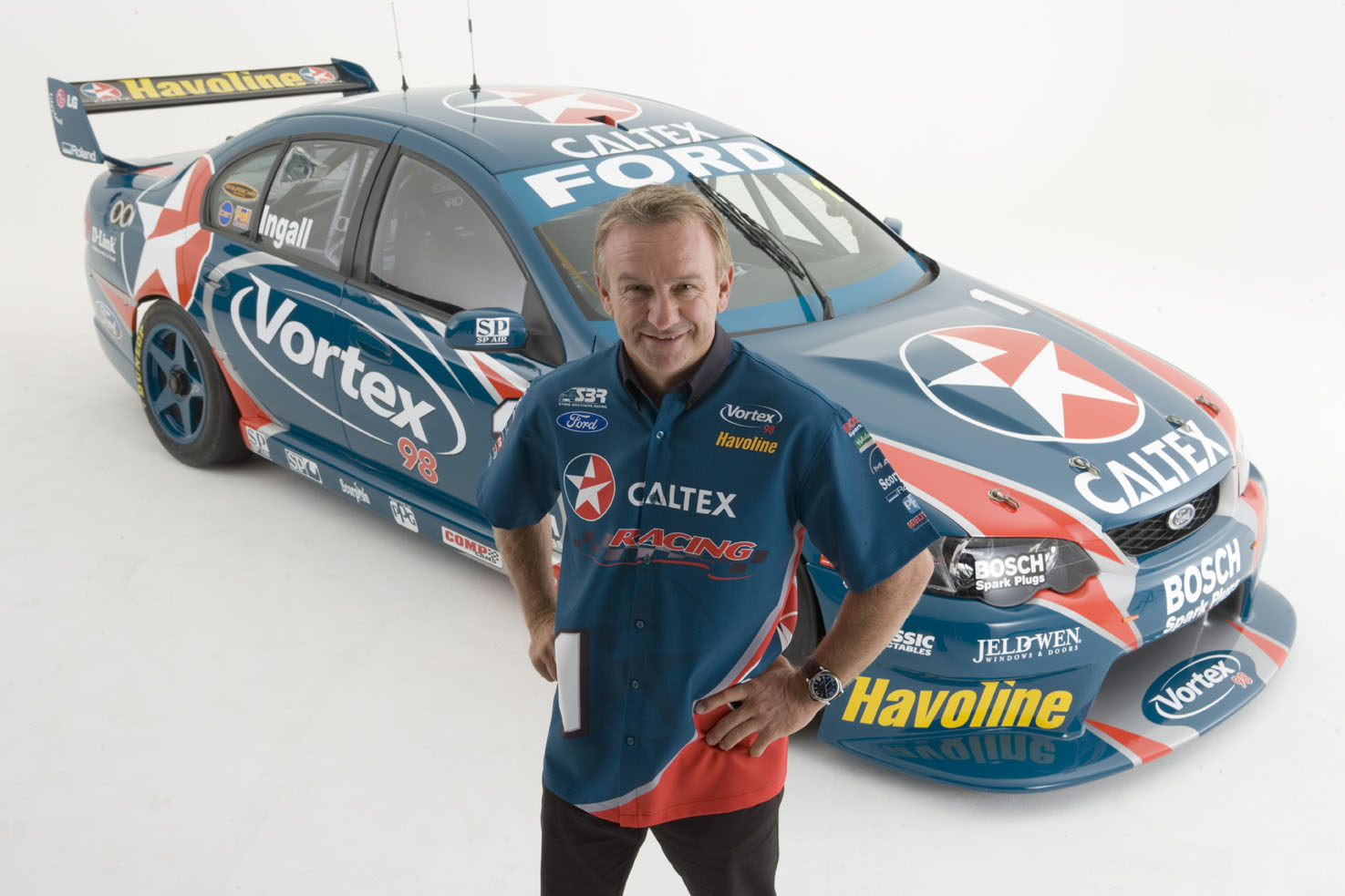
Russell Ingall and his 2006 Ford BA Falcon

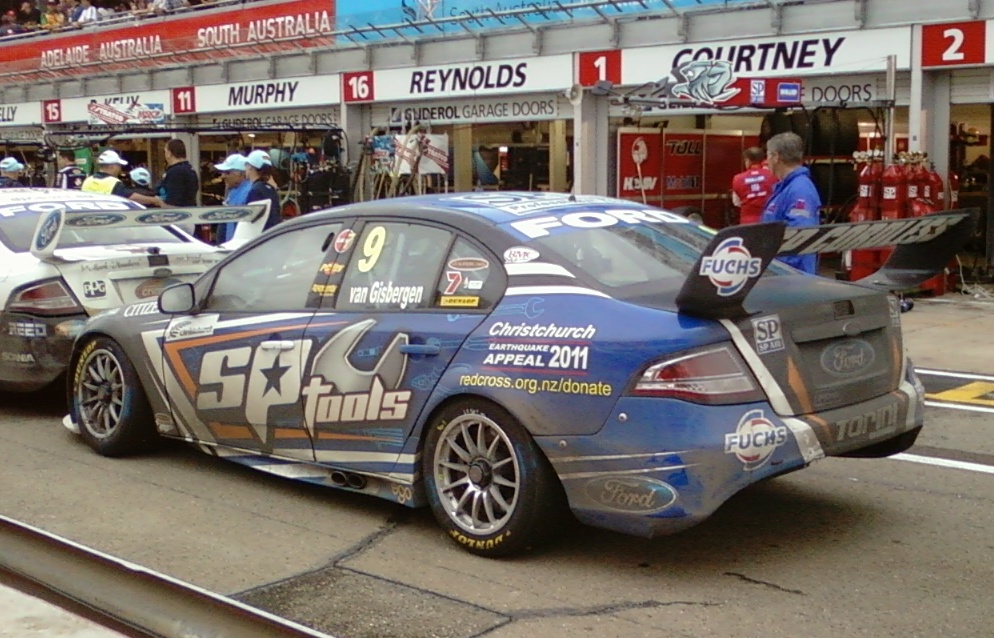
Shane van Gisbergen's Ford FG Falcon at the 2011 Clipsal 500 Adelaide

Stone Brothers Racing (SBR) was an Australian motor racing team that competed in the Supercars Championship between 1998 and 2012. The team was formed in 1998 when Ross and Jim Stone bought Alan Jones's shares in Alan Jones Racing and renamed it Stone Brothers Racing.

The team won the Bathurst 1000 in its debut year with Jason Bright and Steven Richards. It won the 2003 and 2004 championships with Marcos Ambrose and the 2005 championship with Russell Ingall. SBR won the Teams Championship (combined points of both cars) in 2003, 2004 and 2005, the 2004 V8 Supercars Series being a 1–2 finish.

The team was based in Yatala on the Gold Coast. Their nominated test track was initially Lakeside Raceway and later Queensland Raceway.

At the end of 2012, the team was sold to Erebus Motorsport.

== History ==
Ross and Jim Stone, two New Zealand-born brothers, were the team manager and chief engineer of SBR respectively. Ross won the New Zealand Formula Ford Championship twice in the 1970s. In 1986 the Stones engineered a Holden VK Commodore for Graeme Crosby and in 1987 they engineered the Nissan Skyline DR30s of Team Nissan New Zealand for Kent Baigent and Graham Bowkett.

In 1988/89 Ross engineered Andrew Miedecke's Ford Sierra RS500, and in 1990/91 a Sierra for Kevin Waldock's Playscape Racing. During the same era, Jim worked for Tony Longhurst Racing.

Both were reunited at Dick Johnson Racing in 1992 running Sierras and later Falcons overseeing victory in 1994 at the Sandown 500 and Bathurst 1000 endurance races. They also masterminded John Bowe's 1995 series and Sandown 500 wins.

The Stone Brothers Racing team was originally formed as Alan Jones Racing in 1996, with Ross and Jim each holding a one-third ownership stake along with the team's lead driver, 1980 Formula One World Champion, Alan Jones. Racing initially under the Pack Leader Racing identity with Paul Romano as No. 2 driver, the team had several title sponsors in 1997 before the Stone brothers bought out Jones' stake at the end of the year.

Now a single car team under the name Stone Brothers Racing, the team signed 1997 Bathurst 1000 co-driver Jason Bright to drive a Pirtek sponsored Ford EL Falcon for the 1998 season. The team also ran a customer car for Larkham Motor Sport with Mark Larkham, essentially a full team-mate to Bright. Bright and Larkham had a mixed year, with the highlight being a win in the Bathurst 1000 with co-driver Steven Richards, which was almost a team 1–2 result as the team displayed excellent strategy and teamwork during the day, only a battery problem slowing the car of Larkham and Brad Jones who still managed to finish fourth. The team continued to show promise in 1999, with Bright scoring three poles, and three podiums including a win at the Hidden Valley Raceway round.

Bright left the team to pursue opportunities in the United States and Larkham Motor Sport went out on its own. The team expanded to a two-car operation for 2000, with Craig Baird taking over the Pirtek car, and Tony Longhurst the new Caltex sponsored entry. In a lean year, the team's best finish was a third for Baird at the opening Phillip Island round, although Longhurst and co-driver David Besnard lead the Queensland 500 for a period and late in the Bathurst 1000 until tangling with another car.

SBR then opted for some young talent for 2001, with Marcos Ambrose and David Besnard taking over the driving duties in the Pirtek and Caltex Falcons respectively. Ambrose won a round, took two podiums, and impressed with his qualifying speed. Besnard had a mixed year, taking one podium. Both drivers remained with the team for the 2002 season, and took two round wins between them; a Queensland 500 victory for Besnard and Simon Wills, and a dominant win at the final round at Sandown for Ambrose.

In 2003, Ambrose continued to drive the Pirtek sponsored Falcon, with Russell Ingall recruited to drive the Caltex car. SBR was the dominant force, with Ambrose winning the championship and Ingall finishing seventh. Between them they won eight of thirteen rounds (6 to Ambrose, 2 for Ingall). Ambrose took 5 pole positions. Meanwhile, Mark Winterbottom won the Development Series in a SBR Ford AU Falcon.

This dominance continued in 2004, with Ambrose winning a second championship and Ingall finishing 2nd overall. The team recorded 6 round wins – 5 to Ambrose and 1 to Ingall. Among these round victories was a Sandown 500 victory for Ambrose and Greg Ritter, with Ingall and Cameron McLean finishing second.

In 2005, Ingall won the championship through consistency and strategy, rather than outright speed and wins were crucial with Ingall only recording one round win. Ambrose had led the championship until he was involved in an incident in the Bathurst 1000 with Greg Murphy. He went on to finish third behind Ingall and Craig Lowndes. Ambrose took victories in the first and last rounds of the year.

In 2006, Ambrose left V8 Supercars to pursue a career in NASCAR, and Pirtek withdrew its sponsorship. Former F1 Test Driver James Courtney was signed to drive the No. 4 car, now sponsored by Jeld-Wen. Ingall continued in the Caltex entry, but could not defend his title – eventually finishing a disappointing eighth. Courtney improved throughout the season to finish 11th, and won Rookie of the Year. The highlight of the year was the team's performance at the Bathurst 1000, with Courtney and Glenn Seton third, and Ingall and Luke Youlden coming in fourth.

Ingall and Courtney continued driving for SBR in 2007, which proved to be an inconsistent season. Courtney scored round podiums in Adelaide, Bathurst and Bahrain, and a pole position in Adelaide; while Ingall managed a podium on the Gold Coast. From the Oran Park round, SBR also entered a customer car for Team Kiwi Racing with Shane van Gisbergen driving.

In 2008, Russell Ingall and Caltex both left the team, being replaced by Shane van Gisbergen and SP Tools. Courtney broke through for his first race win in the series at the team's test track, Queensland Raceway and with David Besnard finished third at the Bathurst 1000.

In 2009, Courtney and Jeld-Wen were replaced by Alex Davison and Irwin Tools. The team also ran a customer car for Britek Motorsport with Jason Bright driving. In 2010, James Rosenberg Racing replaced Britek Motorsport with Tim Slade driving. In 2011, the driver line-up remained. In 2012, Lee Holdsworth replaced Alex Davison.

After selling the team to Erebus Motorsport at the end of 2012, Ross stayed on as team manager until the end of 2014, while Jim is running Matt Stone Racing in the Development Series with his son. Ross has since begun his own team, Ross Stone Racing running an Aston Martin in GT racing for Andrew Miedecke.

== Supercars results ==
=== Car No. 4 results ===
Year	Driver	No.	Make	1	2	3	4	5	6	7	8	9	10	11	12	13	14	15	16	17	18	19	20	21	22	23	24	25	26	27	28	29	30	31	32	33	34	35	36	37	38	39	40	Position	Pts
2001	Marcos Ambrose	4	Ford	PHI; R1; 4	PHI; R2; 6	ADE; R3; Ret	ADE; R4; 6	EAS; R5; 13	EAS; R6; 6	HDV; R7; 2	HDV; R8; 4	HDV; R9; 3	CAN; R10; Ret	CAN; R11; 2	CAN; R12; Ret	BAR; R13; 18	BAR; R14; 16	BAR; R15; 24	CAL; R16; 3	CAL; R17; 5	CAL; R18; 9	ORA; R19; 16	ORA; R20; Ret	QLD; R21; Ret	WIN; R22; 5	WIN; R23; 3	BAT; R24; Ret	PUK; R25; 2	PUK; R26; 3	PUK; R27; 4	SAN; R28; 6	SAN; R29; 5	SAN; R30; 2											8th	2086
2002	Marcos Ambrose	4	Ford	ADE; R1; 3	ADE; R2; Ret	PHI; R3; 1	PHI; R4; Ret	EAS; R5; 2	EAS; R6; 2	EAS; R7; 4	HDV; R8; 3	HDV; R9; 9	HDV; R10; 5	CAN; R11; 4	CAN; R12; 6	CAN; R13; 20	BAR; R14; 6	BAR; R15; 24	BAR; R16; 10	ORA; R17; 4	ORA; R18; 2	WIN; R19; 2	WIN; R20; 4	QLD; R21; 5	BAT; R22; 21	SUR; R23; 2	SUR; R24; Ret	PUK; R25; 3	PUK; R26; 3	PUK; R27; 10	SAN; R28; 1	SAN; R29; 1												3rd	1498
2003	Marcos Ambrose	4	Ford	ADE; R1; 1	ADE; R1; Ret	PHI; R3; 17	EAS; R4; 1	WIN; R5; 1	BAR; R6; 3	BAR; R7; 2	BAR; R8; 1	HDV; R9; 2	HDV; R10; 1	HDV; R11; 1	QLD; R12; 2	ORA; R13; 1	SAN; R14; 5	BAT; R15; 6	SUR; R16; 6	SUR; R17; 4	PUK; R18; 6	PUK; R19; 23	PUK; R20; 9	EAS; R21; 1	EAS; R22; 1																			1st	2085
2004	Marcos Ambrose	1	Ford	ADE; R1; 1	ADE; R2; 1	EAS; R3; 7	PUK; R4; 1	PUK; R5; 3	PUK; R6; 3	HDV; R7; 3	HDV; R8; 13	HDV; R9; 2	BAR; R10; 3	BAR; R11; 4	BAR; R12; 3	QLD; R13; 1	WIN; R14; 26	ORA; R15; 2	ORA; R16; 1	SAN; R17; 1	BAT; R18; 4	SUR; R19; 1	SUR; R20; 2	SYM; R21; 2	SYM; R22; 1	SYM; R23; Ret	EAS; R24; 1	EAS; R25; 1	EAS; R26; 1															1st	2174
2005	Marcos Ambrose	1	Ford	ADE; R1; 1	ADE; R2; 1	PUK; R3; 5	PUK; R4; 3	PUK; R5; 4	BAR; R6; 2	BAR; R7; 5	BAR; R8; 3	EAS; R9; 1	EAS; R10; 2	SHA; R11; 5	SHA; R12; 4	SHA; R13; 12	HDV; R14; 4	HDV; R15; 28	HDV; R16; 9	QLD; R17; 2	ORA; R18; 4	ORA; R19; 2	SAN; R20; 14	BAT; R21; Ret	SUR; R22; Ret	SUR; R23; 26	SUR; R24; 11	SYM; R25; 4	SYM; R26; 27	SYM; R27; 6	PHI; R28; 3	PHI; R29; 1	PHI; R30; 1											3rd	1856
2006	James Courtney	4	Ford	ADE; R1; Ret	ADE; R2; Ret	PUK; R3; 8	PUK; R4; 18	PUK; R5; 8	BAR; R6; 12	BAR; R7; 5	BAR; R8; Ret	WIN; R9; 15	WIN; R10; Ret	WIN; R11; 27	HDV; R12; 16	HDV; R13; 6	HDV; R14; 23	QLD; R15; 3	QLD; R16; 3	QLD; R17; Ret	ORA; R18; 9	ORA; R19; 8	ORA; R20; 3	SAN; R21; 9	BAT; R22; 3	SUR; R23; 17	SUR; R24; 12	SUR; R25; 6	SYM; R26; 5	SYM; R27; 13	SYM; R28; Ret	BHR; R29; 5	BHR; R30; 24	BHR; R31; 7	PHI; R32; 9	PHI; R33; Ret	PHI; R34; 12							11th	2347
2007	James Courtney	4	Ford	ADE; R1; 2	ADE; R2; 3	BAR; R3; 11	BAR; R4; Ret	BAR; R5; Ret	PUK; R6; 9	PUK; R7; 5	PUK; R8; 3	WIN; R9; 17	WIN; R10; 15	WIN; R11; 8	EAS; R12; Ret	EAS; R13; 14	EAS; R14; 8	HDV; R15; 16	HDV; R16; Ret	HDV; R17; DNS	QLD; R18; 3	QLD; R19; 4	QLD; R20; 18	ORA; R21; 19	ORA; R22; 7	ORA; R23; Ret	SAN; R24; 16	BAT; R25; 2	SUR; R26; 6	SUR; R27; 15	SUR; R28; 4	BHR; R29; 6	BHR; R30; 2	BHR; R31; 2	SYM; R32; 28	SYM; R33; 8	SYM; R34; 6	PHI; R35; 12	PHI; R36; 7	PHI; R37; 6				9th	359
2008	James Courtney	4	Ford	ADE; R1; 16	ADE; R2; Ret	EAS; R3; 5	EAS; R4; 15	EAS; R5; Ret	HAM; R6; 4	HAM; R7; 3	HAM; R8; 3	BAR; R9; 20	BAR; R10; 7	BAR; R11; 8	SAN; R12; 6	SAN; R13; 4	SAN; R14; 3	HDV; R15; 10	HDV; R16; 23	HDV; R17; 7	QLD; R18; 1	QLD; R19; 6	QLD; R20; 2	WIN; R21; 9	WIN; R22; 9	WIN; R23; 25	PHI; Q 3	PHI; R24; 6	BAT; R25; 3	SUR; R26; 9	SUR; R27; 11	SUR; R28; Ret	BHR; R29; 5	BHR; R30; 7	BHR; R31; 2	SYM; R32; Ret	SYM; R33; 17	SYM; R34; 10	ORA; R35; 5	ORA; R36; 6	ORA; R37; 4			6th	2446
2012	Lee Holdsworth	4	Ford	ADE; R1; 5	ADE; R2; 8	SYM; R3; 9	SYM; R4; 6	HAM; R5; 13	HAM; R6; 6	BAR; R7; 4	BAR; R8; 5	BAR; R9; 21	PHI; R10; 5	PHI; R11; 9	HID; R12; 10	HID; R13; 12	TOW; R14; 9	TOW; R15; 26	QLD; R16; 26	QLD; R17; Ret	SMP; R18; 26	SMP; R19; 21	SAN; Q 13	SAN; R20; 8	BAT; R21; 8	SUR; R22; Ret	SUR; R23; 8	YMC; R24; 5	YMC; R25; 8	YMC; R26; 8	WIN; R27; 3	WIN; R28; 10	SYD; R29; DNS	SYD; R30; 12										8th	2189

=== Car No. 9 results ===
Year	Driver	No.	Make	1	2	3	4	5	6	7	8	9	10	11	12	13	14	15	16	17	18	19	20	21	22	23	24	25	26	27	28	29	30	31	32	33	34	35	36	37	38	39	40	Position	Pts	
2001	David Besnard	9	Ford	PHI; R1	PHI; R2	ADE; R3	ADE; R4	EAS; R5	EAS; R6	HDV; R7	HDV; R8	HDV; R9	CAN; R10	CAN; R11	CAN; R12	BAR; R13	BAR; R14	BAR; R15	CAL; R16	CAL; R17	CAL; R18	ORA; R19	ORA; R20	QLD; R21	WIN; R22	WIN; R23	BAT; R24	PUK; R25	PUK; R26	PUK; R27	SAN; R28	SAN; R29	SAN; R30											23rd	1153	
2002	David Besnard	9	Ford	PHI; R3	PHI; R4	EAS; R5	EAS; R6	EAS; R7	HDV; R8	HDV; R9	HDV; R10	CAN; R11	CAN; R12	CAN; R13	BAR; R14	BAR; R15	BAR; R16	ORA; R17	ORA; R18	WIN; R19	WIN; R20	QLD; R21	BAT; R22	SUR; R23	SUR; R24	PUK; R25	PUK; R26	PUK; R27	SAN; R28	SAN; R29														8th	988	
2003	Russell Ingall	9	Ford	ADE; R1; 7	ADE; R1; 12	PHI; R3; 10	EAS; R4; 3	WIN; R5; 4	BAR; R6; 5	BAR; R7; 27	BAR; R8; 14	HDV; R9; Ret	HDV; R10; 17	HDV; R11; 8	QLD; R12; 1	ORA; R13; 8	SAN; R14; 5	BAT; R15; 6	SUR; R16; 1	SUR; R17; 1	PUK; R18; 19	PUK; R19; 26	PUK; R20; 10	EAS; R21; DSQ	EAS; R22; DSQ																			7th	1701	
2004	Russell Ingall	9	Ford	ADE; R1; 3	ADE; R2; Ret	EAS; R3; 14	PUK; R4; 12	PUK; R5; 7	PUK; R6; 7	HDV; R7; 1	HDV; R8; 11	HDV; R9; 5	BAR; R10; 9	BAR; R11; 17	BAR; R12; 13	QLD; R13; 4	WIN; R14; 4	ORA; R15; 3	ORA; R16; 4	SAN; R17; 2	BAT; R18; 6	SUR; R19; 25	SUR; R20; 10	SYM; R21; 7	SYM; R22; 5	SYM; R23; 5	EAS; R24; 7	EAS; R25; 9	EAS; R26; 3															2nd	1936	
2005	Russell Ingall	9	Ford	ADE; R1; 2	ADE; R2; 18	PUK; R3; 2	PUK; R4; 2	PUK; R5; 2	BAR; R6; 4	BAR; R7; 2	BAR; R8; 1	EAS; R9; 5	EAS; R10; 6	SHA; R11; 13	SHA; R12; 6	SHA; R13; 26	HDV; R14; 14	HDV; R15; 4	HDV; R16; Ret	QLD; R17; 4	ORA; R18; 2	ORA; R19; 1	SAN; R20; 7	BAT; R21; 5	SUR; R22; 4	SUR; R23; 10	SUR; R24; 24	SYM; R25; 8	SYM; R26; 9	SYM; R27; 10	PHI; R28; 5	PHI; R29; 5	PHI; R30; 5											1st	1922	
2006	Russell Ingall	1	Ford	ADE; R1; 9	ADE; R2; 7	PUK; R3; 2	PUK; R4; 6	PUK; R5; 5	BAR; R6; 10	BAR; R7; 8	BAR; R8; 6	WIN; R9; 12	WIN; R10; 5	WIN; R11; 25	HDV; R12; 10	HDV; R13; 7	HDV; R14; 9	QLD; R15; 5	QLD; R16; 9	QLD; R17; 5	ORA; R18; 12	ORA; R19; 5	ORA; R20; 21	SAN; R21; 27	BAT; R22; 4	SUR; R23; 8	SUR; R24; 8	SUR; R25; 5	SYM; R26; 14	SYM; R27; 10	SYM; R28; 10	BHR; R29; 13	BHR; R30; 21	BHR; R31; 10	PHI; R32; 14	PHI; R33; 26	PHI; R34; 30							8th	2708	
2007	Russell Ingall	9	Ford	ADE; R1; 8	ADE; R2; 4	BAR; R3; 24	BAR; R4; 14	BAR; R5; 10	PUK; R6; 8	PUK; R7; 9	PUK; R8; 10	WIN; R9; Ret	WIN; R10; 8	WIN; R11; 6	EAS; R12; 7	EAS; R13; 11	EAS; R14; 12	HDV; R15; Ret	HDV; R16; Ret	HDV; R17; 11	QLD; R18; 9	QLD; R19; 6	QLD; R20; 9	ORA; R21; Ret	ORA; R22; 9	ORA; R23; 3	SAN; R24; 7	BAT; R25; Ret	SUR; R26; 4	SUR; R27; 3	SUR; R28; 3	BHR; R29; 5	BHR; R30; 8	BHR; R31; 7	SYM; R32; 16	SYM; R33; 30	SYM; R34; 13	PHI; R35; 8	PHI; R36; 19	PHI; R37; 26				11th	311	
2008	Shane van Gisbergen	9	Ford	ADE; R1; 12	ADE; R2; 5	EAS; R3; 17	EAS; R4; 27	EAS; R5; 17	HAM; R6; 21	HAM; R7; 26	HAM; R8; 10	BAR; R9; Ret	BAR; R10; 10	BAR; R11; 12	SAN; R12; 9	SAN; R13; 2	SAN; R14; 4	HDV; R15; 12	HDV; R16; 15	HDV; R17; 9	QLD; R18; 17	QLD; R19; 21	QLD; R20; 17	WIN; R21; 14	WIN; R22; 22	WIN; R23; 12	PHI; Q 5	PHI; R24; 10	BAT; R25; Ret	SUR; R26; 17	SUR; R27; 13	SUR; R28; Ret	BHR; R29; 7	BHR; R30; 26	BHR; R31; 10	SYM; R32; 5	SYM; R33; Ret	SYM; R34; DSQ	ORA; R35; Ret	ORA; R36; 13	ORA; R37; 5			15th	1614	
2009	Shane van Gisbergen	9	Ford	ADE; R1; 6	ADE; R2; 13	HAM; R3; 17	HAM; R4; 15	WIN; R5; 6	WIN; R6; 12	SYM; R7; 6	SYM; R8; 20	HDV; R9; 20	HDV; R10; 9	TOW; R11; 12	TOW; R12; Ret	SAN; R13; 15	SAN; R14; Ret	QLD; R15; 9	QLD; R16; 12	PHI; Q 4	PHI; R17; 10	BAT; R18; 13	SUR; R19; 5	SUR; R20; 7	SUR; R21; 19	SUR; R22; 11	PHI; R23; 5	PHI; R24; 6	BAR; R25; 15	BAR; R26; 13	SYD; R27; 10	SYD; R28; 6												12th	1970	
2010	Shane van Gisbergen	9	Ford	YMC; R1; 6	YMC; R2; 3	BHR; R3; 5	BHR; R4; 3	ADE; R5; 22	ADE; R6; 4	HAM; R7; Ret	HAM; R8; 7	QLD; R9; 3	QLD; R10; 3	WIN; R11; 5	WIN; R12; 12	HDV; R13; 3	HDV; R14; 3	TOW; R15; 8	TOW; R16; 7	PHI; Q 3	PHI; R17; 27	BAT; R18; 9	SUR; R19; 3	SUR; R20; 2	SYM; R21; 13	SYM; R22; 11	SAN; R23; 9	SAN; R24; Ret	SYD; R25; Ret	SYD; R26; 3														6th	2391	
2011	Shane van Gisbergen	9	Ford	YMC; R1; 4	YMC; R2; 8	ADE; R3; 13	ADE; R4; 18	HAM; R5; 16	HAM; R6; 1	BAR; R7; 4	BAR; R8; 10	BAR; R9; 7	WIN; R10; 14	WIN; R11; 4	HID; R12; 7	HID; R13; 1	TOW; R14; 11	TOW; R15; 5	QLD; R16; 11	QLD; R17; 8	QLD; R18; 3	PHI; Q 1	PHI; R19; 5	BAT; R20; 6	SUR; R21; 16	SUR; R22; 16	SYM; R23; 7	SYM; R24; 7	SAN; R25; 5	SAN; R26; 6	SYD; R27; 3	SYD; R28; 3													4th	2672
2012	Shane van Gisbergen	9	Ford	ADE; R1; 11	ADE; R2; 6	SYM; R3; 4	SYM; R4; 2	HAM; R5; 22	HAM; R6; 10	BAR; R7; 7	BAR; R8; 11	BAR; R9; 18	PHI; R10; 2	PHI; R11; 4	HID; R12; 7	HID; R13; 7	TOW; R14; 22	TOW; R15; 7	QLD; R16; 7	QLD; R17; 7	SMP; R18; 7	SMP; R19; 13	SAN; Q 1	SAN; R20; 5	BAT; R21; 12	SUR; R22; 10	SUR; R23; 9	YMC; R24; 3	YMC; R25; 3	YMC; R26; 4	WIN; R27; Ret	WIN; R28; 4	SYD; R29; Ret	SYD; R30; Ret											6th	2554

== Drivers ==
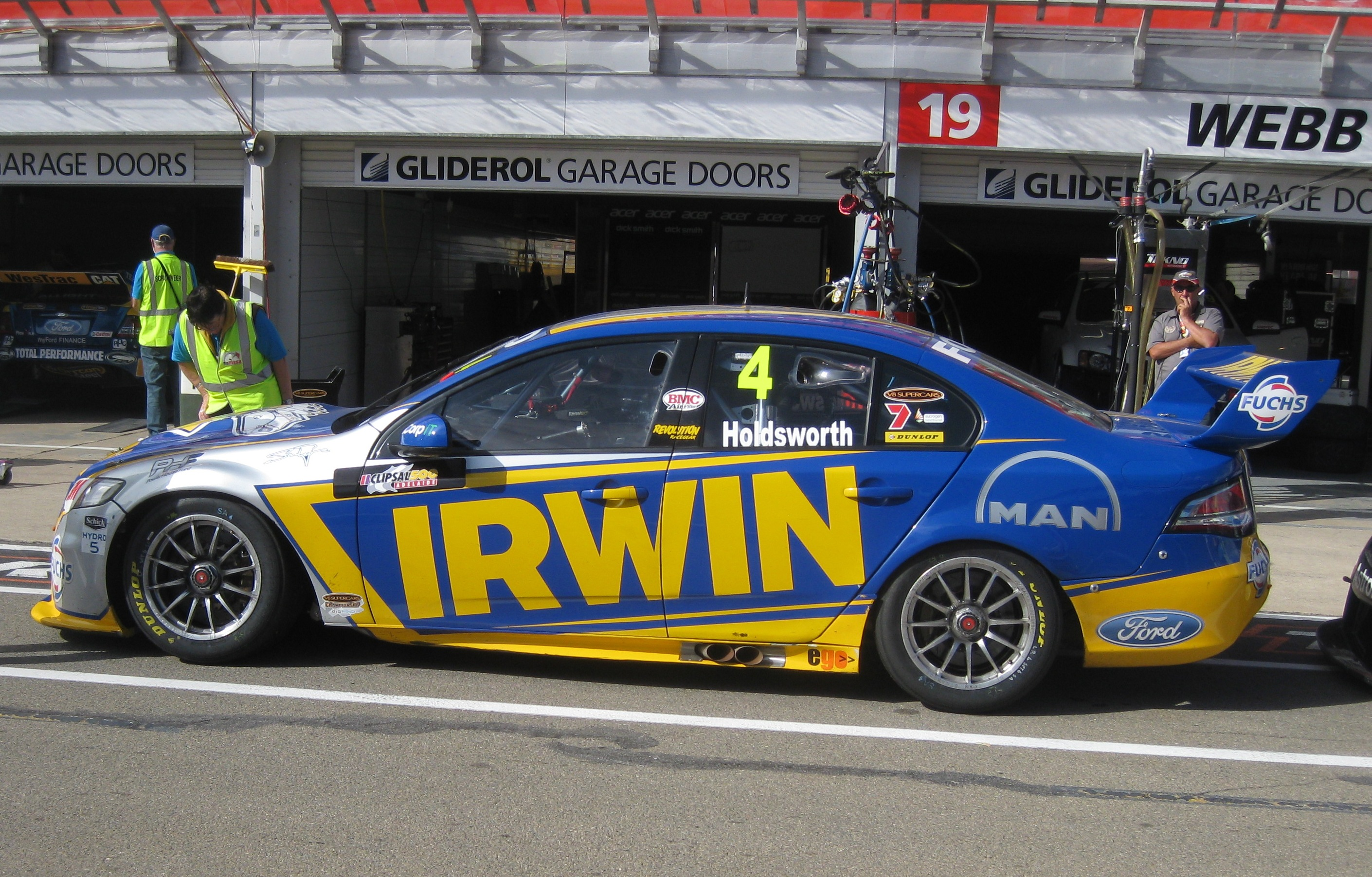
Lee Holdsworth's Ford FG Falcon at the 2012 Clipsal 500 Adelaide

- (Australia) Jason Bright (1998 – 1999)
- (Australia) Mark Larkham (1998)
- (New Zealand) Craig Baird (2000)
- (Australia) Tony Longhurst (2000)
- (Australia) Marcos Ambrose (2001 – 2005)
- (Australia) David Besnard (2001 – 2002)
- (Australia) Wayne Gardner (2002)
- (Australia) Russell Ingall (2003 – 2007)
- (Australia) James Courtney (2006 – 2008)
- (New Zealand) Shane van Gisbergen (2008 – 2012)
- (Australia) Alex Davison (2009 – 2011)
- (Australia) Tim Slade (2010 – 2012)
- (Australia) Lee Holdsworth (2012)

== Super2 drivers ==
- (Australia) David Besnard (2000)
- (Australia) Mark Winterbottom (2003)
- (Australia) Jonathon Webb (2007–2008)
- (New Zealand) John McIntyre (2010)
- (New Zealand) Scott McLaughlin (2010–2012)
