= WPS Racing =

Former motor racing team

- Team Principal: Craig Gore
- Debut: 2004
- Final Season: 2007
- Round wins: 0
- Pole positions: 0
- 2007 position: 9th (192 points)

WPS Racing was an Australian motor racing team that competed in Australian V8 Supercar racing between 2004 and 2007. It was owned by Queensland businessman Craig Gore and sponsored by his Wright Patton Shakespeare company.

== History ==
In 2003, Wright Patton Shakespeare entered V8 Supercars as a sponsor of Mark Noske’s Ford Falcon AU for the last three events of the season. In 2004, Gore purchased two Ford Falcon BAs, a transporter and associated equipment from the defunct 00 Motorsport team as well as the car and equipment (which was also ex 00 Motorsport) that Noske had used in 2003. The team initially ran one car with Noske and David Besnard sharing the driving duties under a Level 2 franchise leased from Lansvale Racing Team. The second car was entered from Round 4 following the purchase of a Level 2 franchise from David Thexton. It also raced the ex Noske AU in the non-championship Konica race at Bathurst for Neil McFadyen.

Noske left the team before the end of the year with Craig Baird joining in 2005, WPS also purchased two Level 1 licences from Perkins Engineering. In 2006, WPS Racing 'merged' with Larkham Motor Sport, with Mark Larkham joining as team manager, Jason Bargwanna and Orrcon Steel also transferring. Max Wilson drove the second car.

In October 2007, Craig Gore was involved in a helicopter accident which caused considerable damage to his inner ear. On medical advice he had been told to avoid any sources of loud noises, thus stopping him from attending V8 Supercar events. Attempts were made to sell the team as a going concern in late 2007 and early 2008 were not successful and it closed in February 2008.

== Controversy ==
In the 2004 Tasmanian Round warm-up session, both cars were black-flagged for having the slogan "No money from Ford" on top of the windscreen. This slogan was deemed unsportsmanlike in the V8 Supercar series. The slogan was to highlight Craig Gore dissatisfaction with Ford, who refused to provide financial assistance. Craig Gore's team went on to win a race in the first year at this event, the race win was objected by a number of teams but later granted to Besnard.

== Drivers ==
- Mark Noske (2004)
- David Besnard (2004-06)
- Alex Yoong (2004)
- Charlie O'Brien (2004)
- John McIntyre (2004)
- Neil McFadyen (2004)
- Owen Kelly (2004)
- Craig Baird (2005-06)
- Marcus Marshall (2005)
- Alex Tagliani (2005)
- Jason Bargwanna (2006-07)
- Max Wilson (2006-07)
- Grant Denyer (2007)
- Michael Caruso (2007)
