= Shane Price =

Australian racing driver

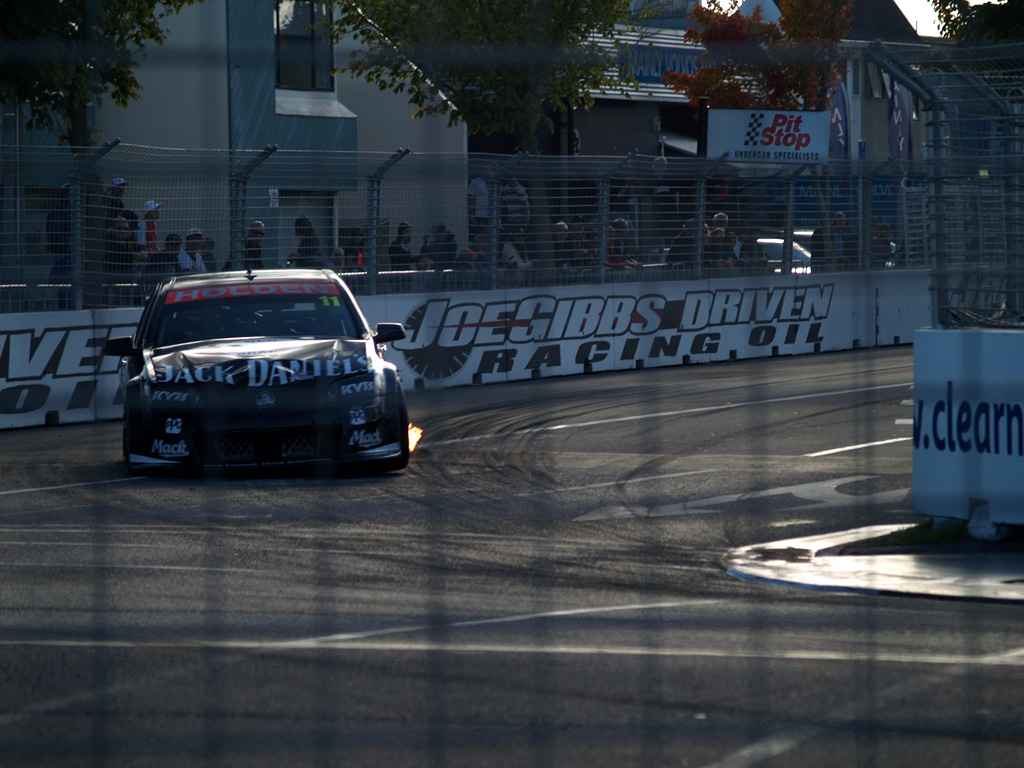
- Nationality: Australian
- Born: 26 December 1986 (age 39) Melbourne, Victoria, Australia
- Relatives: Melinda Price (aunt)

Supercars Championship career
- Current team: Brad Jones Racing
- Championships: 0
- Races: 34
- Wins: 0
- Podiums: 0
- Pole positions: 0
- 2011 position: 53rd (197 pts)

Shane Price (born 26 December 1986 in Melbourne, Victoria, Australia) is an Australian motor racing driver who raced for two seasons in the V8 Supercar Championship Series in 2007 and 2008. He has been a front runner in several different motor racing series and is a former New Zealand Superkart champion.

== Biography ==
The son of multiple Kart champion Drew Price and nephew to female racer Melinda Price, Price grew up around the sport. In 2006 after finishing runner up in the Victorian and Australian Formula Ford Championships, V8 Supercar team Perkins Motorsport gave him his first foray into the Fujitsu V8 Supercar Series, finishing runner up again, this time to Adam Macrow.

In 2007, Larry Perkins promoted Price to the main series in the Jack Daniel's Racing VE Commodore. This was his first full season in the top V8 series in Australia. 2008 saw him continue with Jack Daniel's Racing until he was replaced by his 2006 Fujitsu V8 series teammate Jack Perkins after round 10 due after the team struggled through the season.

In 2008, Price was chosen by Holden as one of the drivers for the 2008 WPS Bathurst 12 Hour in a Holden Commodore Sportswagon although a result was not forthcoming as the car struggled with brake problems. 2009 saw a return to the Fujitsu series and a debut in Superkarts. His first Superkart meeting in New Zealand saw Price take out the national championship.

== Career results ==
Season	Series	Position	Car	Team
2001	Australian Junior Clubman Championship	1st	Arrow AX6 Junior Kart	Arrow Racing Team
2002	Australian Junior Clubman Championship	1st	Arrow AX6 Junior Kart	Arrow Racing Team
2003	Victorian Formula Ford Championship	22nd	Spectrum 09 - Ford	Drew Price Racing
2004	Victorian Formula Ford Championship	2nd	Spectrum 09 - Ford	Drew Price Racing
2004	Australian Formula Ford Championship	13th	Spectrum 09 - Ford	Drew Price Racing
2005	Australian Formula Ford Championship	2nd	Spectrum 010b - Ford	Drew Price Racing
2006	Fujitsu V8 Supercar Series	2nd	Holden VZ Commodore	Jack Daniel's Racing
2006	V8 Supercar Championship Series	36th	Holden VZ Commodore	Jack Daniel's Racing; Paul Morris Motorsport
2007	V8 Supercar Championship Series	36th	Holden VE Commodore	Jack Daniel's Racing
2008	V8 Supercar Championship Series	27th	Holden VE Commodore	Jack Daniel's Racing
2008	Australian Sports Sedan Series	13th	Saab 9-3 - Chrysler	Mark Nelson
2008	Fujitsu V8 Supercar Series	35th	Holden VZ Commodore	Jay Motorsport
2009	New Zealand Superkart Championship	1st	Anderson Maverick - SAFE	Safe Evolutions
2009	Australian Superkart Championship	6th	Anderson Maverick - SAFE	Safe Evolutions
2009	Fujitsu V8 Supercar Series	11th	Holden VZ Commodore	Jay Motorsport
2009	V8 Supercar Championship Series	39th	Holden VE Commodore	Walkinshaw Racing
2010	V8 Supercar Championship Series	60th	Holden VE Commodore	Tony D'Alberto Racing
2010	Fujitsu V8 Supercar Series	42nd	Holden VE Commodore	Jay Motorsport
2010	Australian National Sprint Kart Championship - Clubman Heavy	3rd	Arrow	Shane Price
2011	International V8 Supercars Championship	53rd	Holden VE Commodore	Brad Jones Racing
2014	Dunlop V8 Supercar Series	42nd	Holden VE Commodore	THR Motorsports

=== Complete Bathurst 1000 results ===
Year	Team	Car	Co-driver	Position	Laps
2006	Perkins Engineering	Holden Commodore VZ	(Australia) Jack Perkins	DNF	1
2007	Perkins Engineering	Holden Commodore VE	(Australia) Jack Perkins	DNF	102
2008	Perkins Engineering	Holden Commodore VE	(Australia) Todd Kelly	17th	157
2009	Walkinshaw Racing	Holden Commodore VE	(Australia) Steve Owen	16th	160
2010	Tony D'Alberto Racing	Holden Commodore VE	(Australia) Tony D'Alberto	DNF	38
2011	Brad Jones Racing	Holden Commodore VE	(Australia) Jason Bargwanna	23rd	158
