= Ryan Hansford =

Australian race driver

- Nationality: (Australia) Australian
- Born: 17 March 1982 (age 44) Brisbane, Queensland

Ryan Hansford (born 17 March 1982) is an racing driver from Australia. He is the son of racecar driver Gregg Hansford. Hansford won the Touring Car Masters championship in 2020 and 2022.

== Biography ==
Hansford began his career competing in state in Queensland in a Holden Gemini at age 27.

Hansford entered the Super2 Series in 2010 Fujitsu V8 Supercar Series, for Peters Motorsport in a Ford BA Falcon. He was replaced for the final round of the year by David Besnard. He finished 11th for the year. Hansford also participated in the HQ Holden Series at Bathurst in the same year.

== Career stats ==
Season	Series	Position	Car	Team
2008	Queensland Gemini Championship	12th	Holden Gemini Coupe	
2008	Golden Holden 1 Hour	NC	Holden Gemini Coupe	Wilson Racing
2009	Fujitsu V8 Supercar Series	29th	Ford BA Falcon	Loscam Racing
2009	Queensland Gemini Championship	2nd	Holden Gemini Coupe	Peters Motorsport
2009	2009 Mini Challenge Australia	17th	Mini JCW R56 Challenge	
2009	Golden Holden 1 Hour	3rd	Holden Gemini Coupe	Dawson Racing
2010	Fujitsu V8 Supercar Series	11th	Ford BA Falcon	Peters Motorsport
2011	Australian V8 Ute Racing Series	9th	Ford FG Falcon XR8 Ute	Truckline Racing
2012	Australian V8 Ute Racing Series	8th	Ford FG Falcon XR8 Ute	Truckline Racing
2013	Australian V8 Ute Racing Series	8th	Ford FG Falcon XR8 Ute	HT Racing
2014	Australian V8 Ute Racing Series	8th	Ford FG Falcon XR8 Ute	Peters Motorsport
2015	Australian V8 Ute Racing Series	7th	Ford FG Falcon XR8 Ute	Peters Motorsport
2016	Australian V8 Ute Racing Series	3rd	Ford FG Falcon XR8 Ute	Peters Motorsport
2017	Touring Car Masters	2nd	Holden Torana SL/R 5000	Peters Motorsport
2018	Touring Car Masters	2nd	Holden Torana SL/R 5000	Peters Motorsport
2019	Touring Car Masters	2nd	Holden Torana SL/R 5000	Peters Motorsport
2020	Touring Car Masters	1st	Holden Torana SL/R 5000	Peters Motorsport
2021	Touring Car Masters	2nd	Holden Torana SL/R 5000	Multi Spares Racing
2022	Touring Car Masters	1st	Holden Torana SL/R 5000	Multi Spares Racing
2023	Touring Car Masters	2nd	Holden Torana SL/R 5000	Multi Spares Racing

=== Complete Super2 Series results ===
(key) (Round results only)

Super2 Series results
Year	Team	Car	1	2	3	4	5	6	7	8	9	10	11	12	13	14	15	16	17	18	Position	Points
2009	Loscam Racing	Ford BA Falcon	ADE; R1	ADE; R2	WIN; R3	WIN; R4	WIN; R5	TOW; R6	TOW; R7	TOW; R8	SAN; R9	SAN; R10	SAN; R11	QLD; R12	QLD; R13	QLD; R14	BAT; R15	BAT; R16	SYD; R17	SYD; R18	29th	
2010	Peters Motorsport	Ford BA Falcon	ADE; R1; 1	ADE; R2; 1	QLD; R3; 2	QLD; R4; 1	QLD; R5; 2	WIN; R6; 2	WIN; R7; 4	WIN; R8; 2	TOW; R9; 1	TOW; R10; 1	TOW; R11; 15	BAT; R12; 2	BAT; R13; 17	SAN; R14; 1	SAN; R15; 5	SAN; R16; 3	SYD; R17; 1	SYD; R18; 1	11th	
