= Steven Johnson (racing driver) =

Australian racing driver (born 1974)

- Steven Johnson at Albert Park in 2007
- Nationality: Australian
- Born: 6 September 1974 (age 52) Brisbane, Queensland, Australia

Supercars Championship career
- Championships: 0
- Races: 419
- Wins: 3
- Podiums: 16
- Pole positions: 2

Steven Johnson (born 6 September 1974) is an Australian racing driver. He is the son of former racer and now team-owner Dick Johnson. He competed full-time for Dick Johnson Racing from 2000–2012. Johnson is married and has two children.

Johnson's best season result was in 2001, where he led the championship for two rounds and took two round wins, including the Canberra round win, where he recorded victory from pole position in the first race, before finishing the rest of the races in the top five. Near season's end, he dropped to fifth, still his best ever effort. Then came a period he would rather forget, finishing the 2002 and 2003 seasons well outside the top ten. He improved to tenth in the 2004 season. He was looking for a top-five in 2005, but had a poor Bathurst 1000 to place him outside the top-ten.

In 2007, Johnson recorded his best Bathurst 1000 result with a podium finish in third after leading late in the drama-charged closing laps as intermittent rain swept across the Mountain in an entertaining scrap with Craig Lowndes, James Courtney and Greg Murphy.

In early 2013, it was announced that Steven Johnson would step down from competing in the V8 Supercars championship and instead become general manager of Dick Johnson Racing. He currently competes in the Touring Car Masters. In the endurance events in the 2013 season, Johnson teamed up with Erebus Motorsport, as a co-driver in car No. 9 SP Tools Racing's Maro Engel.

== Career results ==
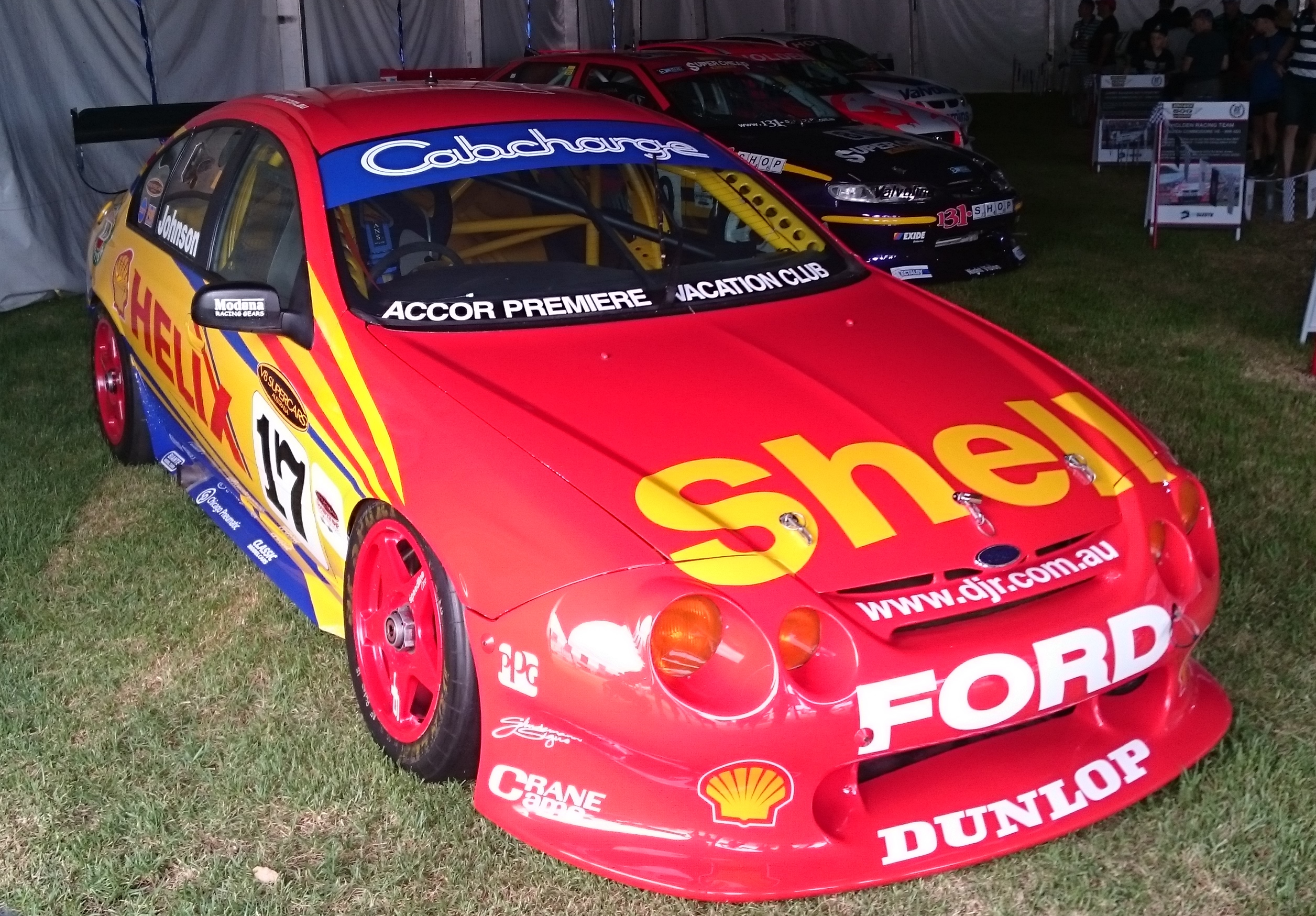
The Ford Falcon AU which Johnson and Paul Radisich drove to victory in the 2001 Queensland 500. The car is pictured in 2018.

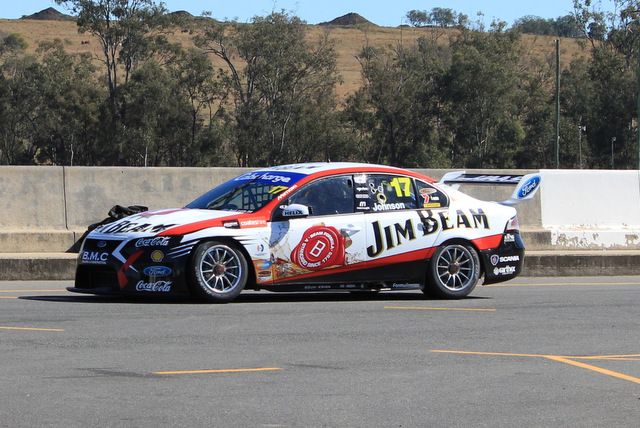
#17 Ford Falcon of Steven Johnson at the 2012 Coates Hire Ipswich 300

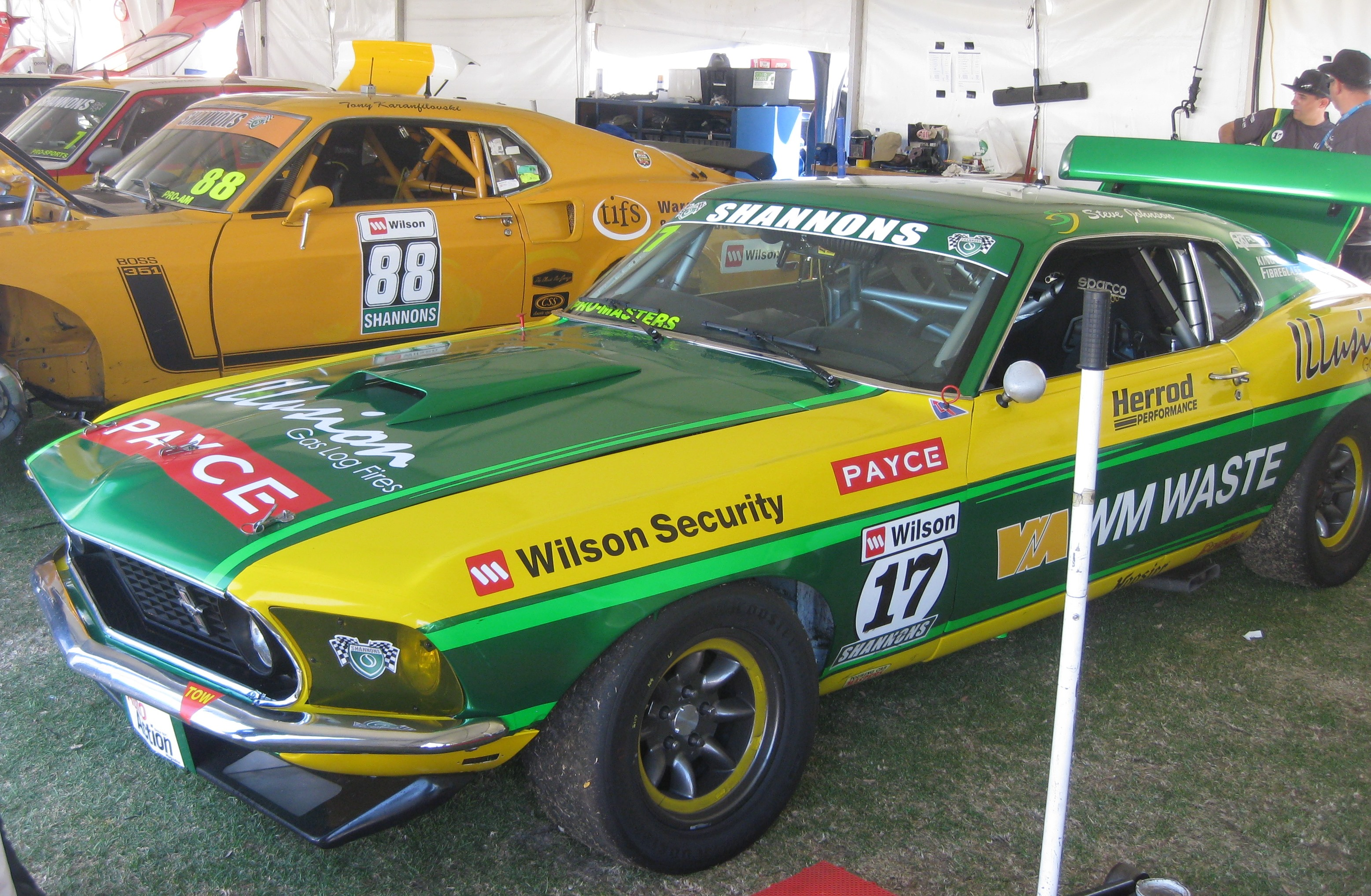
Johnson won the 2017 Touring Car Masters driving a Ford Mustang

Season	Series	Position	Car	Team
1993	Australian Sports Sedan Championship	12th	Datsun 1600-Mazda	
1995	Australian Thundersports series	**2nd**	Ford Mustang; Ford EF Falcon	
1997	Australian Touring Car Championship	33rd	Holden VS Commodore	Alcair Racing
1997	Australian Super Touring Championship	16th	BMW 318i	CPW Motorsport
1998	Australian Touring Car Championship	17th	Ford EL Falcon	Dick Johnson Racing
1999	Shell Championship Series	23rd	Ford AU Falcon	Dick Johnson Racing
2000	Shell Championship Series	11th	Ford AU Falcon	Dick Johnson Racing
2001	Shell Championship Series	5th	Ford AU Falcon	Dick Johnson Racing
2002	V8 Supercar Championship Series	14th	Ford AU Falcon	Dick Johnson Racing
2003	V8 Supercar Championship Series	16th	Ford BA Falcon	Dick Johnson Racing
2004	V8 Supercar Championship Series	10th	Ford BA Falcon	Dick Johnson Racing
2005	V8 Supercar Championship Series	12th	Ford BA Falcon	Dick Johnson Racing
2006	V8 Supercar Championship Series	9th	Ford BA Falcon	Dick Johnson Racing
2007	V8 Supercar Championship Series	12th	Ford BF Falcon	Dick Johnson Racing
2008	V8 Supercar Championship Series	10th	Ford BF Falcon	Dick Johnson Racing
2009	V8 Supercar Championship Series	6th	Ford FG Falcon	Dick Johnson Racing
2010	V8 Supercar Championship Series	10th	Ford FG Falcon	Dick Johnson Racing
2011	International V8 Supercars Championship	15th	Ford FG Falcon	Dick Johnson Racing
2012	International V8 Supercars Championship	17th	Ford FG Falcon	Dick Johnson Racing
2013	Australian Carrera Cup Championship	23rd	Porsche 997 GT3 Cup R	Hunter Sports Group
2013	International V8 Supercars Championship	49th	Mercedes-Benz E63 AMG	Erebus Motorsport
2014	Dunlop V8 Supercar Series	29th	Ford FG Falcon	Matt Stone Racing
2014	International V8 Supercars Championship	47th	Ford FG Falcon	Dick Johnson Racing
2015	Touring Car Masters (Pro Masters Class)	6th	Ford Mustang	Dunlop Super Dealers / Wilson Security
2016	Touring Car Masters (Pro Masters Class)	4th	Ford XY Falcon GTHO	TIFS - Warehousing & Distribution
2017	Touring Car Masters	**1st**	Ford Mustang	WM Waste / Illusion Gas Log Fires
2018	Touring Car Masters	**1st**	Ford Mustang	WM Waste / Herrod Performance
2019	Touring Car Masters	**1st**	Ford Mustang	WM Waste / Kubota
2023	Touring Car Masters	**1st**	Ford Mustang	Hancock Racing

=== Complete Touring Car Masters results ===
(key) (Races in bold indicate pole position) (Races in italics indicate fastest lap)

Year	Team	Car	1	2	3	4	5	6	7	8	9	10	11	12	13	14	15	16	17	18	19	20	21	22	23	24	25	26	27	28	29	30	31	32	33	34	35	36	37	38	39	DC	Points
2015	Dunlop Super Dealers	Ford Mustang	ADE; R1	ADE; R2	ADE; R3	SYM; R4; 1	**SYM**; **R5**; **1**	**SYM**; **R6**; **1**	WIN; R7	WIN; R8	WIN; R9	HID; R19	HID; R11	HID; R12	QLD; R13	QLD; R14	QLD; R15	SMP; R16	SMP; R17	SMP; R18	BAT; R19	BAT; R20	BAT; R21	PHI; R22	PHI; R23	PHI; R24																6th	852
2020	Team Johnson	Ford XD Falcon	ADE; R16; 8	ADE; R16; 5	ADE; R16; 5																																					3rd	152
2021	Team Johnson	Ford XD Falcon	SYM; R1; 7	SYM; R2; 4	SYM; R3; C	SYM; R4; 3	BAT; R5; 12	BAT; R6; 2	BAT; R7; DSQ	BAT; R8; 16	SMP; R9; 9	SMP; R10; 2	SMP; R11; 7	SMP; R12; 1	**BAT**; **R13**; **7**	BAT; R14; 1	BAT; R15; 1	BAT; R16; Ret																								3rd	497
2022	Team Johnson	Ford XD Falcon	SMP; R1; 8	SMP; R2; 4	SMP; R3; 3	SMP; R4; C																																				5th	612
2022	Hancock Racing	Ford Mustang																	BAT; R13; 1	BAT; R14; 1	BAT; R15; 1	BAT; R16; 1	**ADE**; **R16**; **7**	ADE; R16; 1	ADE; R16; 1	ADE; R16; 1																5th	612
2023	Hancock Racing	Ford Mustang	SYM; R1; 5	SYM; R2; 1	**SYM**; **R3**; **1**	**SYM**; **R4**; **2**	NEW; R5; 9	**NEW**; **R6**; **1**	**NEW**; **R7**; **1**	**NEW**; **R8**; **1**	WIN; R9; 5	**WIN**; **R10**; **1**	**WIN**; **R11**; **1**	**WIN**; **R12**; **2**	BEN; R13; 3	BEN; R14; 4	BEN; R15; 3	BAT; R16; 5	BAT; R17; 7	BAT; R18; 7	ADE; R19; 3	ADE; R20; 3	ADE; R21; 2																			1st	1057

=== Supercars Championship results ===
(Races in bold indicate pole position) (Races in italics indicate fastest lap)

Supercars results
Year	Team	Car	1	2	3	4	5	6	7	8	9	10	11	12	13	14	15	16	17	18	19	20	21	22	23	24	25	26	27	28	29	30	31	32	33	34	35	36	37	38	39	Position	Points
1994	Dick Johnson Racing	Ford Falcon (EB)	AMA; R1	AMA; R2	SAN; R3	SAN; R4	SYM; R5	SYM; R6	PHI; R7	PHI; R8	LAK; R9	LAK; R10	WIN; R11	WIN; R12	EAS; R13	EAS; R14	MAL; R15	MAL; R16	BAR; R17	BAR; R18	ORA; R19; 11	ORA; R20; 14																				NC	0
1995	Dick Johnson Racing	Ford Falcon (EF)	SAN; R1	SAN; R2	SYM; R3	SYM; R4	BAT; R5	BAT; R6	PHI; R7	PHI; R8	LAK; R9	LAK; R10	WIN; R11	WIN; R12	EAS; R13	EAS; R14	MAL; R15	MAL; R16	BAR; R17	BAR; R18	ORA; R19; Ret	ORA; R20; 17																				NC	0
1997	Alcair Racing	Holden Commodore (VS)	CAL; R1	CAL; R2	CAL; R3	PHI; R4; DNS	PHI; R5; DNS	PHI; R6; DNS	SAN; R7; 17	SAN; R8; 16	SAN; R9; 14	SYM; R10	SYM; R11	SYM; R12	WIN; R13	WIN; R14	WIN; R15	EAS; R16	EAS; R17	EAS; R18	LAK; R19	LAK; R20	LAK; R21	BAR; R22	BAR; R23	BAR; R24	MAL; R25	MAL; R26	MAL; R27	ORA; R28	ORA; R29	ORA; R30										33rd	2
1998	Dick Johnson Racing	Ford Falcon (EL)	SAN; R1	SAN; R2	SAN; R3	SYM; R4	SYM; R5	SYM; R6	LAK; R7	LAK; R8	LAK; R9	PHI; R10; 11	PHI; R11; 28	PHI; R12; 9	WIN; R13; 9	WIN; R14; Ret	WIN; R15; 10	MAL; R16; 6	MAL; R17; 7	MAL; R18; 4	BAR; R19; 10	BAR; R20; 9	BAR; R21; 7	CAL; R22; Ret	CAL; R23; DNS	CAL; R24; C	HDV; R25	HDV; R26	HDV; R27	ORA; R28; 13	ORA; R29; Ret	ORA; R30; 15										17th	260
1999	Dick Johnson Racing	Ford Falcon (AU)	EAS; R1	EAS; R2	EAS; R3	ADE; R4	BAR; R5	BAR; R6	BAR; R7	PHI; R8	PHI; R9	PHI; R10	HDV; R11	HDV; R12	HDV; R13	SAN; R14	SAN; R15	SAN; R16	QLD; R17	QLD; R18	QLD; R19	CAL; R20; 10	CAL; R21; 6	CAL; R22; 5	SYM; R23	SYM; R24	SYM; R25	WIN; R26	WIN; R27	WIN; R28	ORA; R29	ORA; R30	ORA; R31	QLD; R32; 7	BAT; R33; 4							23rd	576
2000	Dick Johnson Racing	Ford Falcon (AU)	PHI; R1; 16	PHI; R2; 12	BAR; R3; 9	BAR; R4; 8	BAR; R5; 9	ADE; R6; 6	ADE; R7; 8	EAS; R8; 19	EAS; R9; 16	EAS; R10; 28	HDV; R11; 13	HDV; R12; 13	HDV; R13; 11	CAN; R14; 21	CAN; R15; 3	CAN; R16; 12	QLD; R17; 10	QLD; R18; 12	QLD; R19; 8	WIN; R20; 14	WIN; R21; 12	WIN; R22; 8	ORA; R23; Ret	ORA; R24; 14	ORA; R25; 11	CAL; R26; 15	CAL; R27; 14	CAL; R28; Ret	QLD; R29; Ret	SAN; R30; 11	SAN; R31; 24	SAN; R32; 13	BAT; R33; 4							11th	831
2001	Dick Johnson Racing	Ford Falcon (AU)	PHI; R1; 7	PHI; R2; 9	ADE; R3; 2	ADE; R4; 3	EAS; R5; 15	EAS; R6; 15	HDV; R7; 21	HDV; R8; 26	HDV; R9; 16	**CAN**; **R10**; **1**	CAN; R11; 12	CAN; R12; 3	BAR; R13; 9	BAR; R14; 5	BAR; R15; 4	CAL; R16; 1	**CAL**; **R17**; **6**	CAL; R18; 4	ORA; R19; 5	ORA; R20; 4	QLD; R21; 1	WIN; R22; 8	WIN; R23; 9	BAT; R24; Ret	PUK; R25; 9	PUK; R26; 6	PUK; R27; 6	SAN; R28; 12	SAN; R29; Ret	SAN; R30; 13										5th	2532
2002	Dick Johnson Racing	Ford Falcon (AU)	ADE; R1; 8	ADE; R2; 10	PHI; R3; 8	PHI; R4; 10	EAS; R5; 15	EAS; R6; 8	EAS; R7; 24	HDV; R8; 14	HDV; R9; Ret	HDV; R10; 12	CAN; R11; 10	CAN; R12; 14	CAN; R13; 6	BAR; R14; Ret	BAR; R15; 23	BAR; R16; 25	ORA; R17; 25	ORA; R18; Ret	WIN; R19; 27	WIN; R20; Ret	QLD; R21; 13	BAT; R22; Ret	SUR; R23; 10	SUR; R24; 10	PUK; R25; Ret	PUK; R26; 8	PUK; R27; Ret	SAN; R28; 11	SAN; R29; 13											14th	626
2003	Dick Johnson Racing	Ford Falcon (BA)	ADE; R1; 6	ADE; R1; Ret	PHI; R3; 18	EAS; R4; 17	WIN; R5; 19	BAR; R6; 29	BAR; R7; 18	BAR; R8; 12	HDV; R9; 13	HDV; R10; 29	HDV; R11; 12	QLD; R12; 12	ORA; R13; Ret	SAN; R14; 15	BAT; R15; 13	SUR; R16; 8	SUR; R17; 8	PUK; R18; 10	PUK; R19; Ret	PUK; R20; 16	EAS; R21; 20	EAS; R22; Ret																		16th	1229
2004	Dick Johnson Racing	Ford Falcon (BA)	ADE; R1; 20	ADE; R2; Ret	EAS; R3; 6	PUK; R4; 13	PUK; R5; 8	PUK; R6; 8	HDV; R7; Ret	HDV; R8; 19	HDV; R9; 11	BAR; R10; 13	BAR; R11; 10	BAR; R12; 11	QLD; R13; 24	WIN; R14; Ret	ORA; R15; 32	ORA; R16; 17	SAN; R17; 3	BAT; R18; 7	SUR; R19; 11	SUR; R20; 9	SYM; R21; 13	SYM; R22; 10	SYM; R23; 8	EAS; R24; 9	EAS; R25; 6	EAS; R26; 13														10th	1416
2005	Dick Johnson Racing	Ford Falcon (BA)	ADE; R1; 4	ADE; R2; 15	PUK; R3; 13	PUK; R4; 26	PUK; R5; Ret	BAR; R6; 11	BAR; R7; 4	BAR; R8; 5	EAS; R9; 13	EAS; R10; 9	SHA; R11; 11	SHA; R12; 26	SHA; R13; 21	HDV; R14; 12	HDV; R15; 11	HDV; R16; 7	QLD; R17; 10	ORA; R18; 10	ORA; R19; 31	SAN; R20; 18	BAT; R21; 19	SUR; R22; 14	SUR; R23; 11	SUR; R24; 12	SYM; R25; 10	SYM; R26; 7	SYM; R27; 8	PHI; R28; 22	PHI; R29; 19	PHI; R30; 18										12th	1460
2006	Dick Johnson Racing	Ford Falcon (BA)	ADE; R1; 10	ADE; R2; 9	PUK; R3; 9	PUK; R4; 9	PUK; R5; 9	BAR; R6; 9	BAR; R7; 17	BAR; R8; 10	WIN; R9; 11	WIN; R10; Ret	WIN; R11; 14	HDV; R12; 29	HDV; R13; 2	HDV; R14; 15	QLD; R15; 14	QLD; R16; 23	QLD; R17; 25	ORA; R18; 10	ORA; R19; 4	ORA; R20; 4	SAN; R21; 4	BAT; R22; Ret	SUR; R23; 10	SUR; R24; 10	SUR; R25; 9	SYM; R26; 13	SYM; R27; 16	SYM; R28; Ret	BHR; R29; 27	BHR; R30; 11	BHR; R31; 6	PHI; R32; 19	PHI; R33; 15	PHI; R34; 22						9th	2378
2007	Dick Johnson Racing	Ford Falcon (BF)	ADE; R1; 9	ADE; R2; 6	BAR; R3; 5	BAR; R4; 4	BAR; R5; 4	PUK; R6; 13	PUK; R7; 21	PUK; R8; 16	WIN; R9; 6	WIN; R10; 5	WIN; R11; Ret	EAS; R12; 10	EAS; R13; 8	EAS; R14; 9	HDV; R15; 11	HDV; R16; 23	HDV; R17; 18	QLD; R18; 11	QLD; R19; 22	QLD; R20; Ret	ORA; R21; 13	ORA; R22; 12	ORA; R23; 12	SAN; R24; Ret	BAT; R25; 3	SUR; R26; 8	SUR; R27; 13	SUR; R28; Ret	BHR; R29; 3	BHR; R30; 4	BHR; R31; 6	SYM; R32; 8	SYM; R33; 9	SYM; R34; 8	PHI; R35; 13	PHI; R36; 11	PHI; R37; 27			12th	304
2008	Dick Johnson Racing	Ford Falcon (BF)	ADE; R1; 6	ADE; R2; 9	EAS; R3; 21	EAS; R4; 19	EAS; R5; 18	HAM; R6; Ret	HAM; R7; 13	HAM; R8; 8	BAR; R9; 13	BAR; R10; 15	BAR; R11; 13	SAN; R12; 13	SAN; R13; 5	SAN; R14; 10	HDV; R15; 15	HDV; R16; 19	HDV; R17; 17	QLD; R18; 16	QLD; R19; 17	QLD; R20; 15	WIN; R21; 17	WIN; R22; 11	WIN; R23; 13	PHI; Q 9	PHI; R24; 3	BAT; R25; 6	SUR; R26; 15	SUR; R27; 5	SUR; R28; 4	BHR; R29; 6	BHR; R30; 8	BHR; R31; 13	SYM; R32; 8	SYM; R33; 6	SYM; R34; 7	ORA; R35; 15	ORA; R36; 9	ORA; R37; 16		10th	2163
2009	Dick Johnson Racing	Ford Falcon (FG)	ADE; R1; 4	ADE; R2; 6	HAM; R3; 5	HAM; R4; 3	WIN; R5; 12	WIN; R6; 21	SYM; R7; 3	SYM; R8; 18	HDV; R9; 17	HDV; R10; 13	TOW; R11; 13	TOW; R12; 5	SAN; R13; 8	SAN; R14; 17	QLD; R15; 4	QLD; R16; 15	PHI; Q 4	PHI; R17; 4	BAT; R18; 24	SUR; R19; 10	SUR; R20; 11	SUR; R21; 6	SUR; R22; 5	PHI; R23; 8	PHI; R24; 24	BAR; R25; 10	BAR; R26; 2	SYD; R27; Ret	SYD; R28; 10											6th	2255
2010	Dick Johnson Racing	Ford Falcon (FG)	YMC; R1; 11	YMC; R2; 8	BHR; R3; 11	BHR; R4; 11	ADE; R5; 12	ADE; R6; 8	HAM; R7; 6	HAM; R8; DSQ	QLD; R9; 6	QLD; R10; 8	WIN; R11; 4	WIN; R12; 14	HDV; R13; 18	HDV; R14; 16	TOW; R15; 11	TOW; R16; 22	PHI; R17; 16	BAT; R18; 12	SUR; R19; 16	SUR; R20; Ret	SYM; R21; 17	SYM; R22; 13	SAN; R23; 13	SAN; R24; 5	SYD; R25; 4	SYD; R26; 4														10th	2006
2011	Dick Johnson Racing	Ford Falcon (FG)	YMC; R1; 11	YMC; R2; 18	ADE; R3; 11	ADE; R4; 8	HAM; R5; 5	HAM; R6; 9	BAR; R7; 5	BAR; R8; 14	BAR; R9; 6	WIN; R10; 3	WIN; R11; 8	HID; R12; 2	HID; R13; 9	TOW; R14; 13	TOW; R15; 12	QLD; R16; 8	QLD; R17; 6	QLD; R18; 9	PHI; R19; 26	BAT; R20; Ret	SUR; R21; Ret	SUR; R22; 12	SYM; R23; 23	SYM; R24; 21	SAN; R25; 23	SAN; R26; Ret	SYD; R27; 18	SYD; R28; 14												15th	1708
2012	Dick Johnson Racing	Ford Falcon (FG)	ADE; R1; 10	ADE; R2; 17	SYM; R3; 11	SYM; R4; 21	HAM; R5; 11	HAM; R6; 15	BAR; R7; 19	BAR; R8; 19	BAR; R9; 10	PHI; R10; 19	PHI; R11; 17	HID; R12; 18	HID; R13; 19	TOW; R14; 17	TOW; R15; 13	QLD; R16; 10	QLD; R17; 11	SMP; R18; 27	SMP; R19; 19	SAN; QR; 12	SAN; R20; 21	BAT; R21; 17	SUR; R22; 16	SUR; R23; 12	YMC; R24; 15	YMC; R25; 22	YMC; R26; 18	WIN; R27; 16	WIN; R28; 26	SYD; R29; Ret	SYD; R30; 10									17th	1621
2013	Erebus Motorsport	Mercedes-Benz E63 AMG	ADE; R1	ADE; R2	SYM; R3	SYM; R4	SYM; R5	PUK; R6	PUK; R7	PUK; R8	PUK; R9	BAR; R10	BAR; R11	BAR; R12	COA; R13	COA; R14	COA; R15	COA; R16	HID; R17	HID; R18	HID; R19	TOW; R20	TOW; R21	QLD; R22	QLD; R23	QLD; R24	WIN; R25	WIN; R26	WIN; R27	SAN; R28; 25	BAT; R29; 20	SUR; R30; 21	SUR; R31; 22	PHI; R32	PHI; R33	PHI; R34	SYD; R35	SYD; R36				49th	231
2014	Dick Johnson Racing	Ford Falcon (FG)	ADE; R1	ADE; R2	ADE; R3	SYM; R4	SYM; R5	SYM; R6	WIN; R7	WIN; R8	WIN; R9	PUK; R10	PUK; R11	PUK; R12	PUK; R13	BAR; R14	BAR; R15	BAR; R16	HID; R17	HID; R18	HID; R19	TOW; R20	TOW; R21	TOW; R22	QLD; R23	QLD; R24	QLD; R25	SMP; R26	SMP; R27	SMP; R28	SAN; QR; 24	SAN; R29; 16	BAT; R30; Ret	SUR; R31; 16	SUR; R32; 15	PHI; R33	PHI; R34	PHI; R35	SYD; R36	SYD; R37	SYD; R38	47th	2321

== Bathurst 1000 results ==
Year	Team	Car	Co-driver	Position	Laps
1994	Dick Johnson Racing	Ford Falcon EB	(Australia) Allan Grice	7th	160
1995	Dick Johnson Racing	Ford Falcon EF	(Australia) Charlie O'Brien	7th	158
1996	Dick Johnson Racing	Ford Falcon EF	(United States) Tommy Kendall	8th	158
1997	Dick Johnson Racing	Ford Falcon EF	(New Zealand) Craig Baird	4th	158
1998	Dick Johnson Racing	Ford Falcon EL	(Australia) Dick Johnson	DNF	60
1999	Dick Johnson Racing	Ford Falcon AU	(Australia) Dick Johnson	4th	161
2000	Dick Johnson Racing	Ford Falcon AU	(Australia) Cameron McLean	4th	161
2001	Dick Johnson Racing	Ford Falcon AU	(New Zealand) Paul Radisich	DNF	63
2002	Dick Johnson Racing	Ford Falcon AU	(New Zealand) Paul Radisich	DNF	29
2003	Dick Johnson Racing	Ford Falcon BA	(Australia) Warren Luff	13th	156
2004	Dick Johnson Racing	Ford Falcon BA	(Australia) Warren Luff	7th	161
2005	Dick Johnson Racing	Ford Falcon BA	(Australia) Will Davison	19th	133
2006	Dick Johnson Racing	Ford Falcon BA	(Australia) Will Davison	DNF	27
2007	Dick Johnson Racing	Ford Falcon BF	(Australia) Will Davison	3rd	161
2008	Dick Johnson Racing	Ford Falcon BF	(Australia) Will Davison	6th	161
2009	Dick Johnson Racing	Ford Falcon FG	(Australia) James Courtney	24th	131
2010	Dick Johnson Racing	Ford Falcon FG	(Australia) Marcus Marshall	12th	161
2011	Dick Johnson Racing	Ford Falcon FG	(Australia) David Besnard	DNF	112
2012	Dick Johnson Racing	Ford Falcon FG	(Denmark) Allan Simonsen	17th	161
2013	Erebus Motorsport	Mercedes-Benz E63 AMG	(Germany) Maro Engel	20th	160
2014	Dick Johnson Racing	Ford Falcon FG	(Australia) David Wall	DNF	64
