= 2022 Touring Car Masters =

Australian motor racing series

The 2022 Gulf Western Oil Touring Car Masters was an Australian motor racing series for modified Touring Cars manufactured between 1 January 1963 and 31 December 1980. It was sanctioned by Motorsport Australia as an Authorised Series with TCM Racing Pty. Ltd appointed as the Category Manager. The series was the 16th Touring Car Masters.

The series was won by Ryan Hansford.

== Entries ==
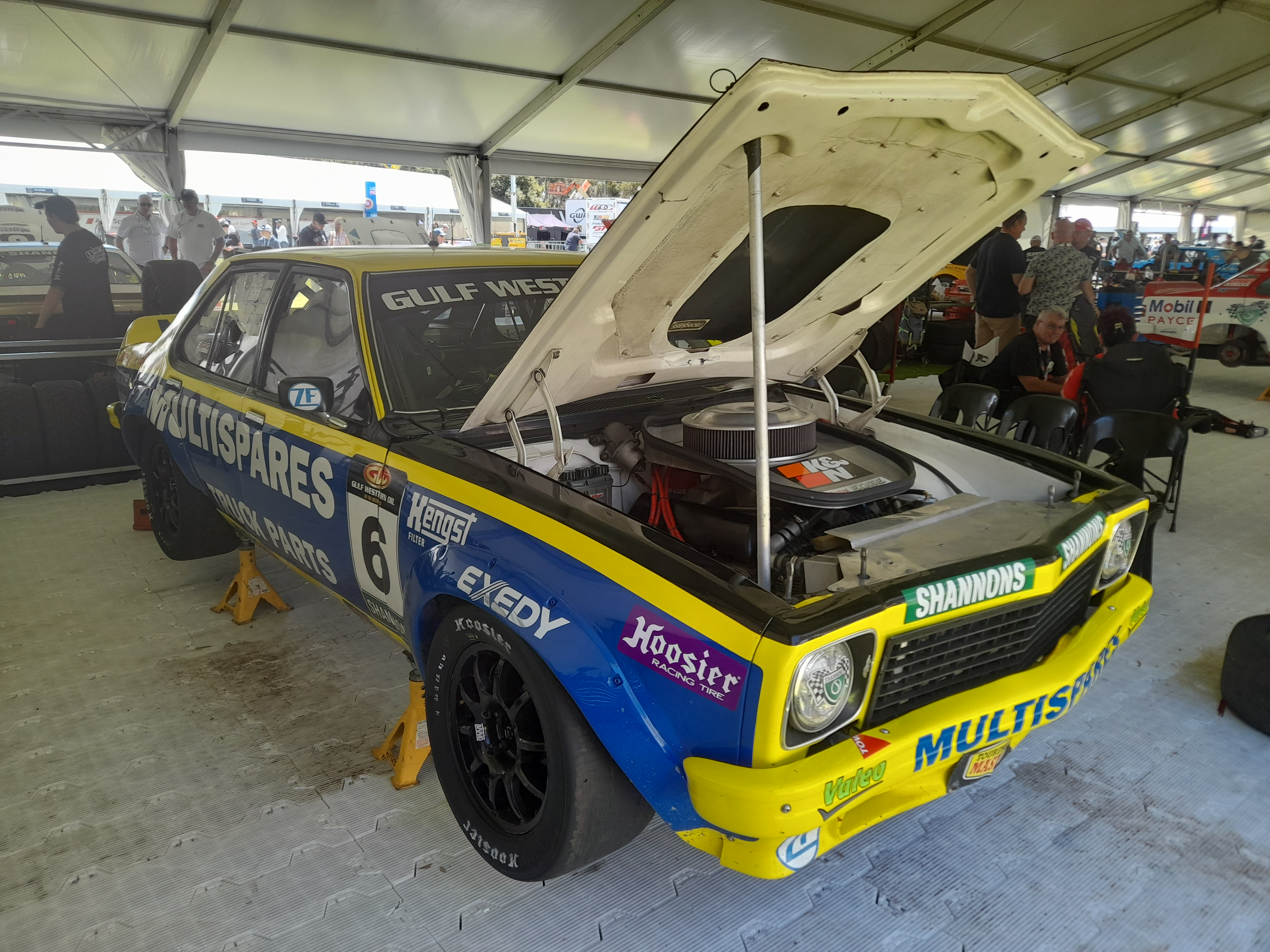
Ryan Hansford won the series driving a Holden Torana SL/R 5000 A9X

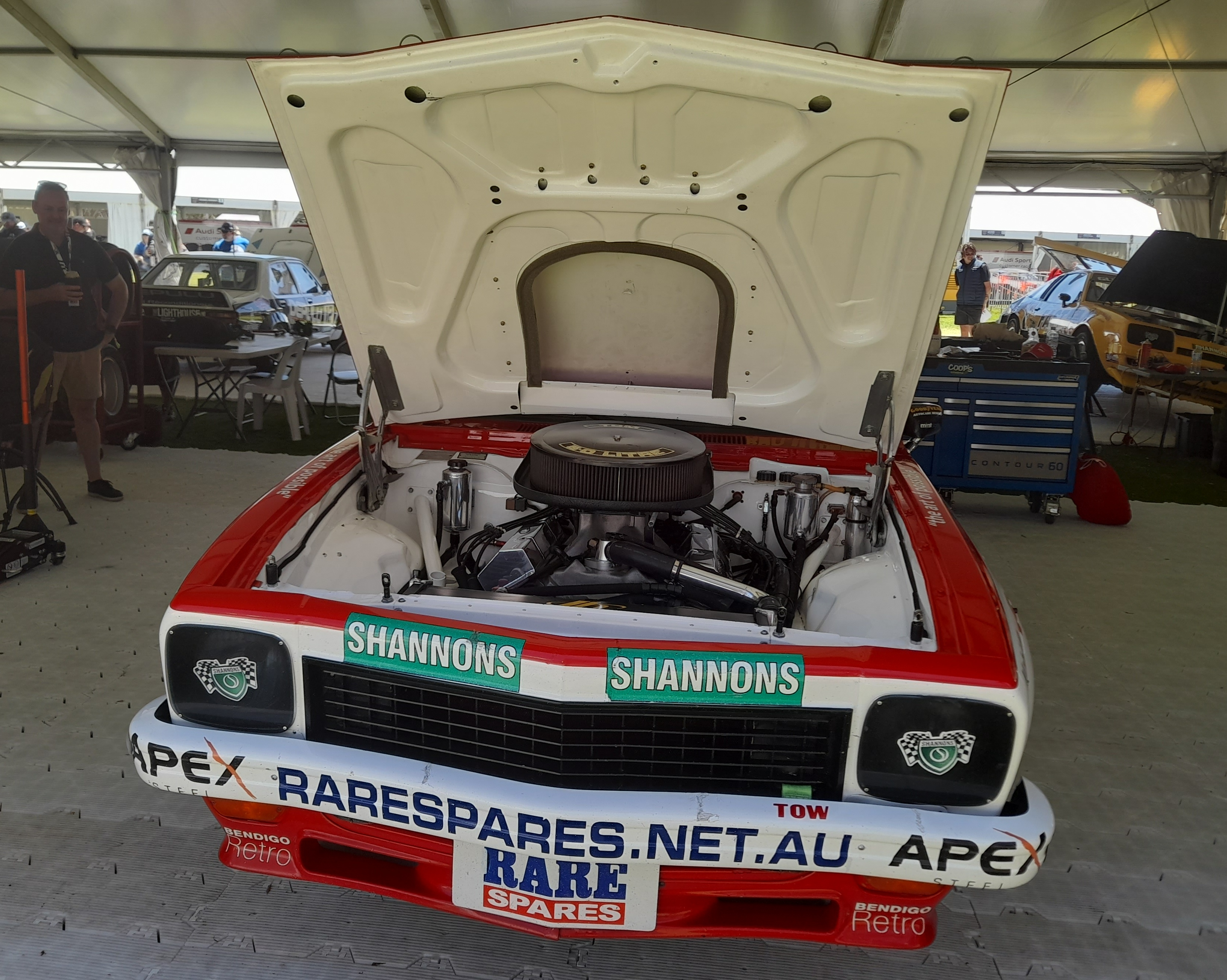
John Bowe placed second driving a Holden Torana SL/R 5000

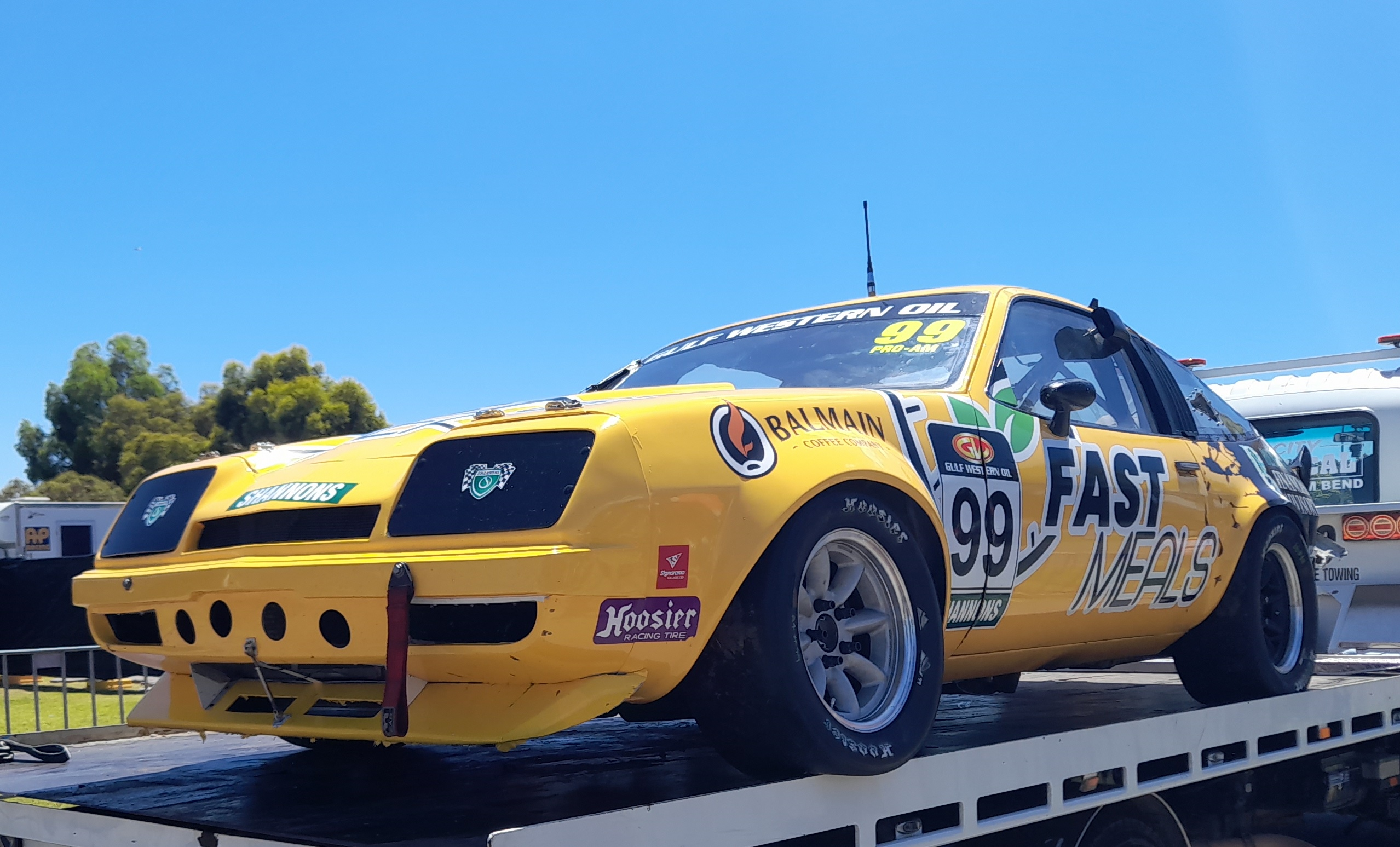
Ben Dunn placed eighth driving a Chevrolet Monza

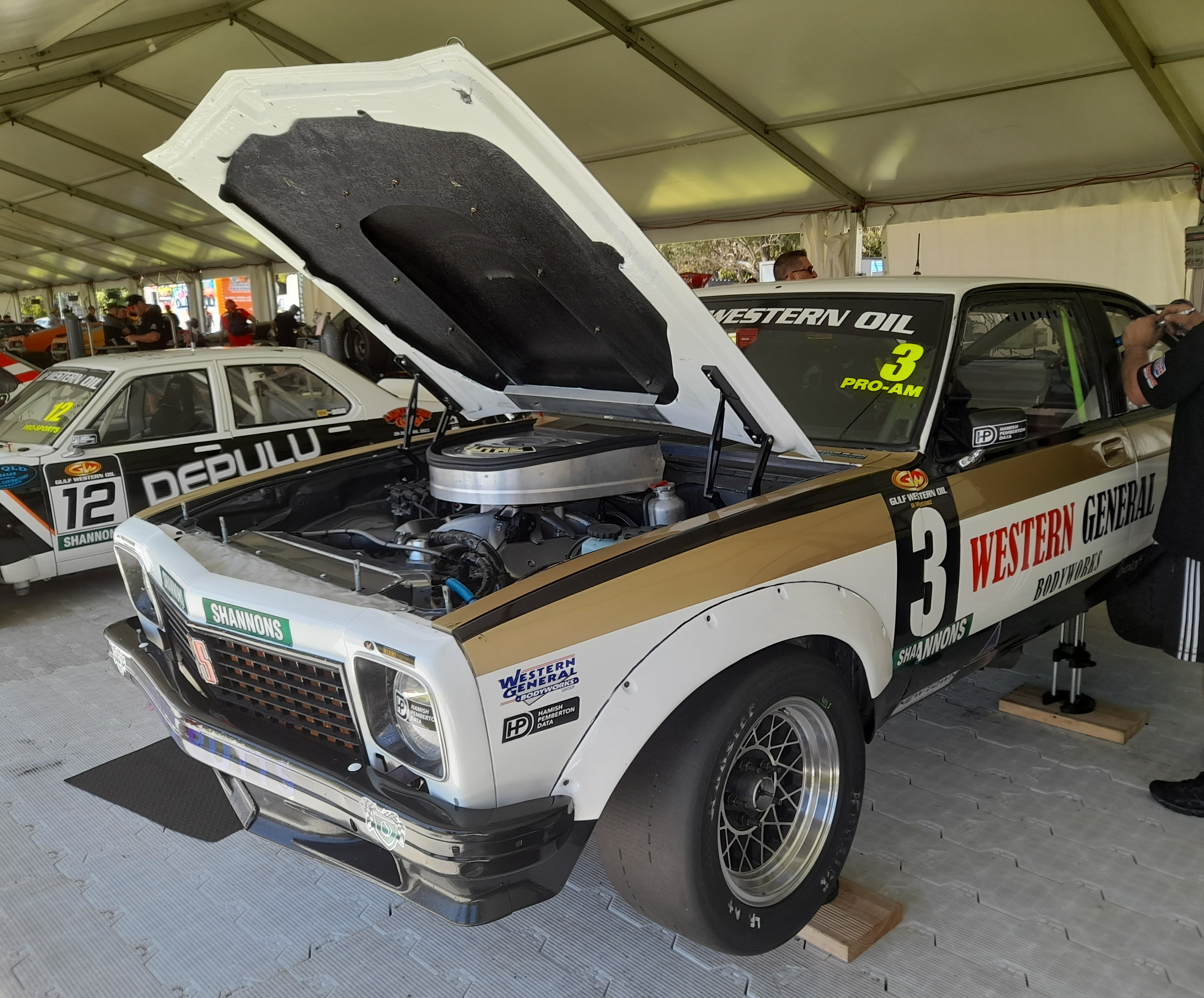
Danny Buzadzic placed tenth driving a Holden Torana A9X

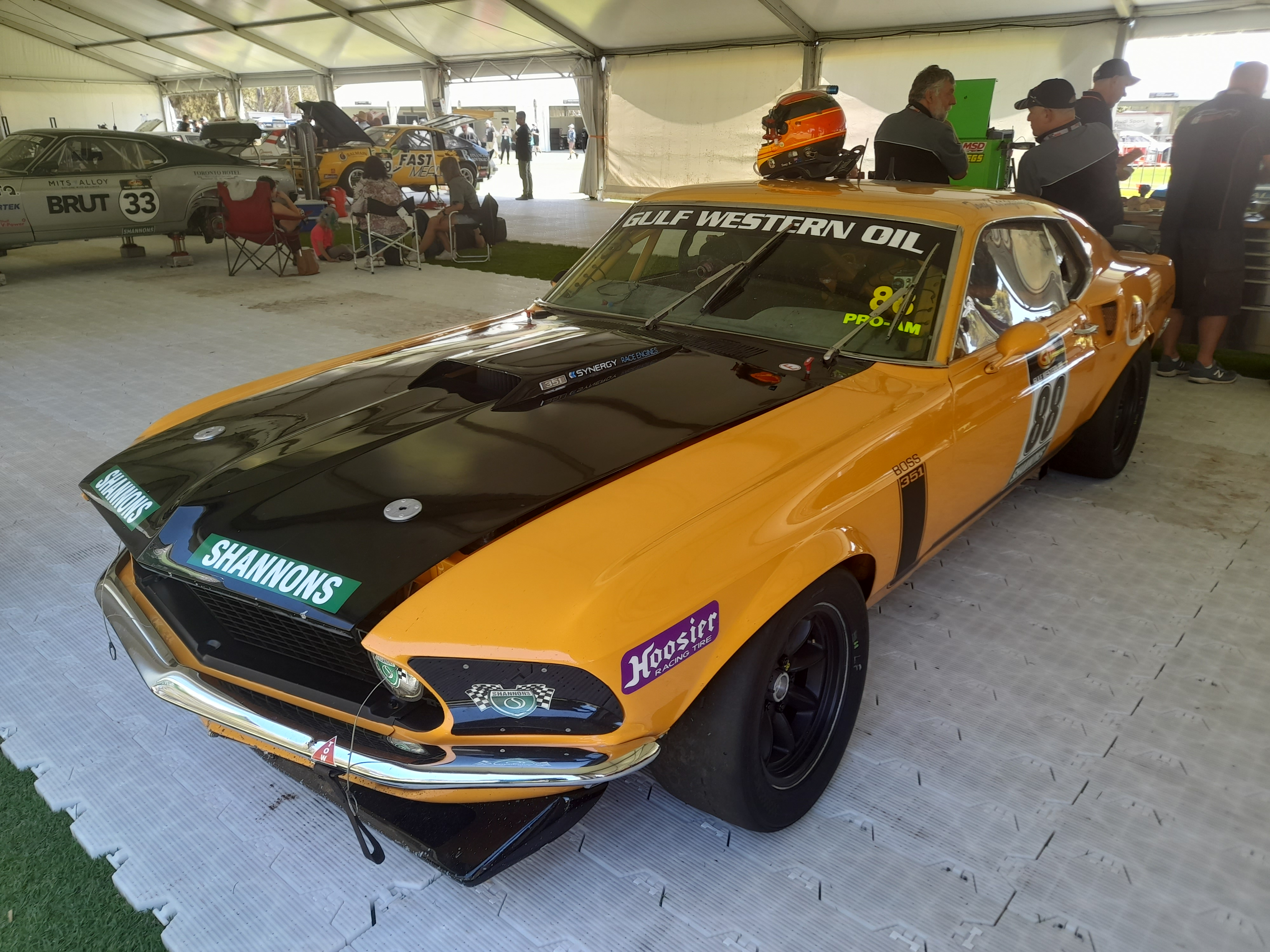
Tony Karanfilovski placed 12th driving a Ford Mustang

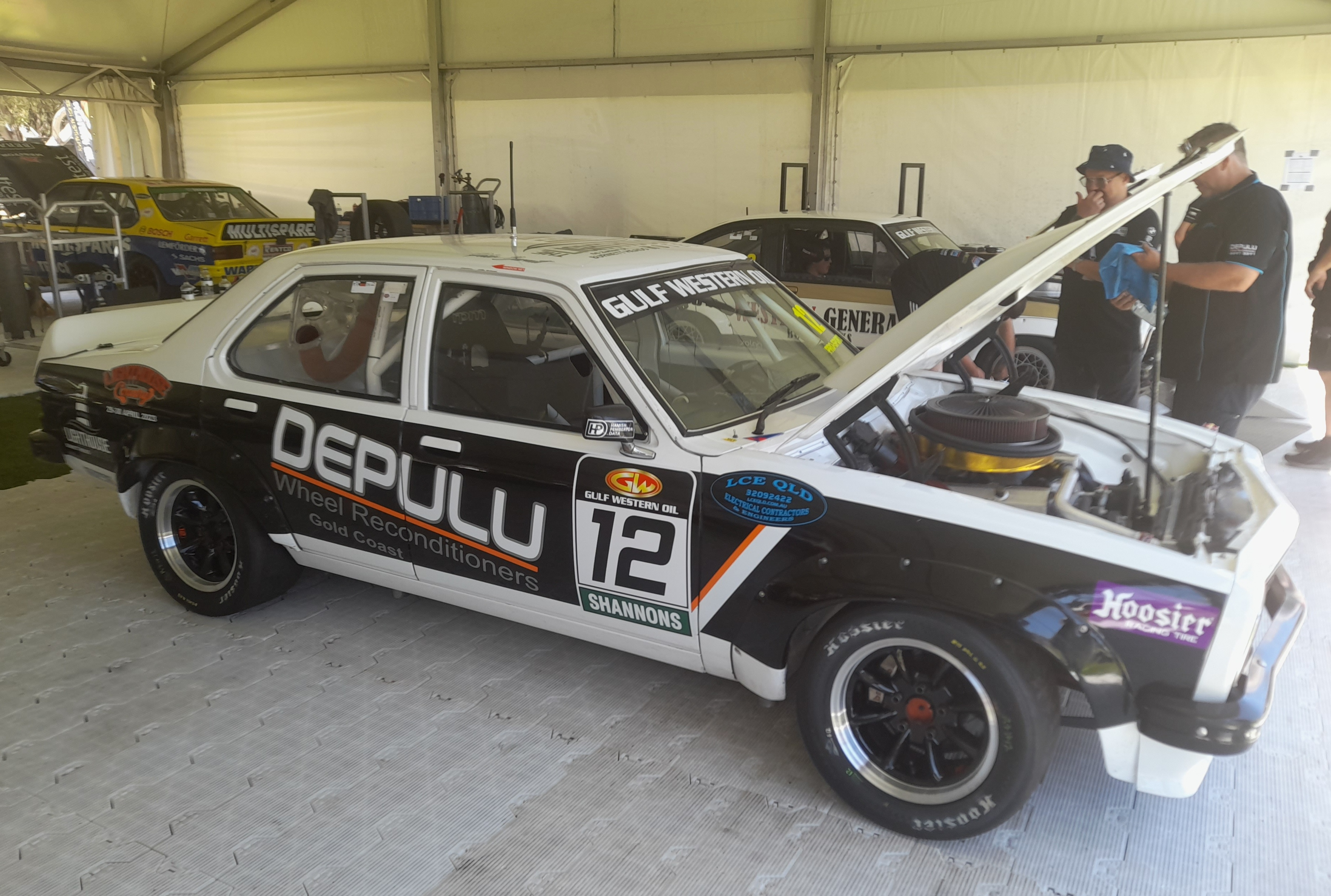
Peter Burnitt placed 14th driving a Holden Torana A9X

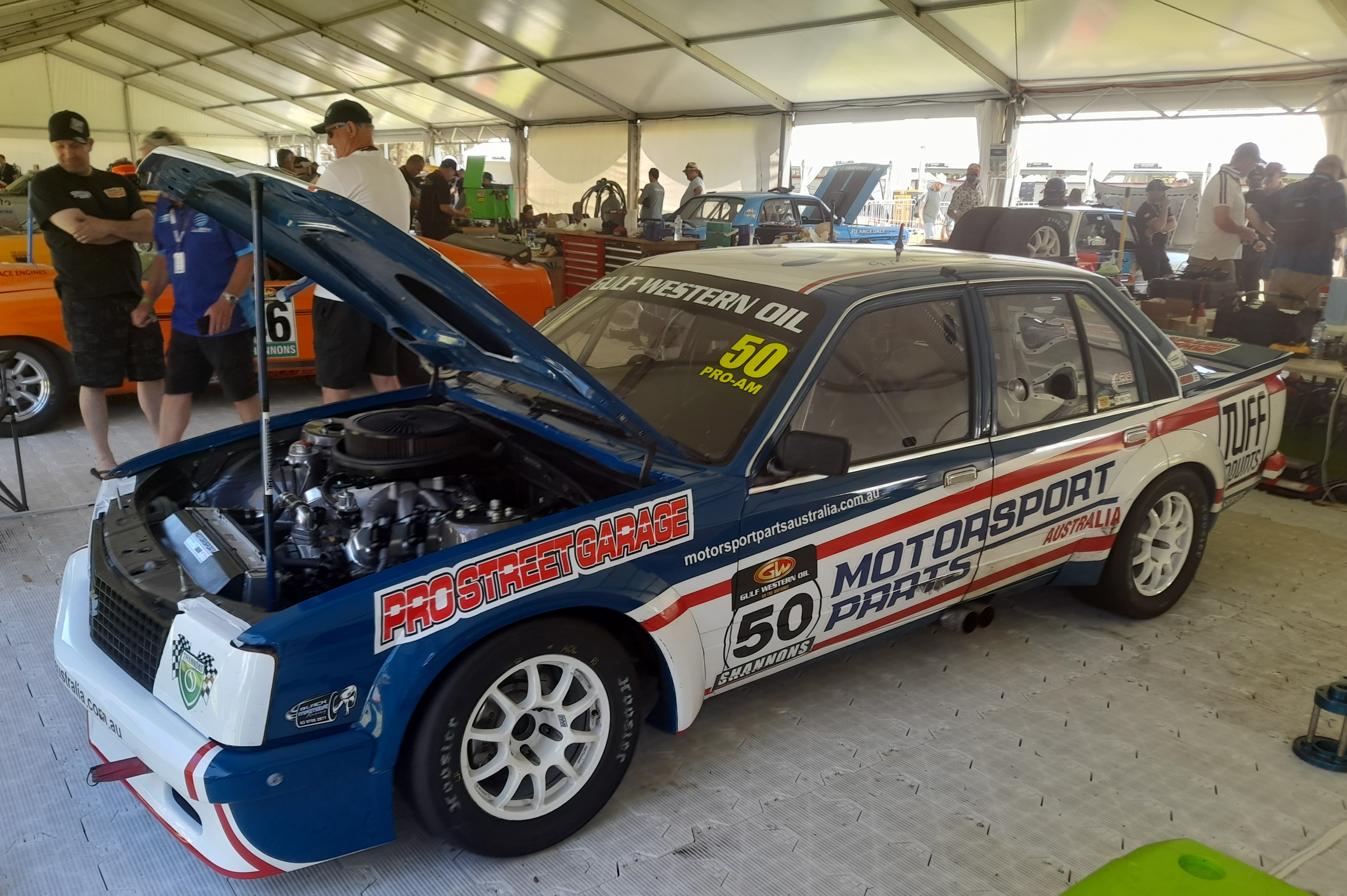
Gerard McLeod placed 16th driving a Holden Commodore VB

Manufacturer	Model	Entrant	No.	Driver Name	Class	Rounds
Chevrolet	Camaro RS	Whiteline Racing	85	(Australia) George Miedecke	PM	1-6
Chevrolet	Camaro SS	Whiteline Racing	95			
Chevrolet	Camaro SS	Whiteline Racing	95	(Australia) Mark King	PA	1-2
Chevrolet	Camaro SS	Whiteline Racing	95	(Australia) Michael Almond	PM	3
Chevrolet	Camaro SS	Whiteline Racing	95	(Australia) Adam Bressington	PM	4
Chevrolet	Camaro SS	ACM Auto Parts	69	(Australia) Cameron McConville	PM	2, 4
Chevrolet	Monza	Balmain Coffee Company	99	(Australia) Ben Dunn	PA	1–4
Chrysler	Valiant Pacer	Anglomoil Superior Lubricants	60	(Australia) Cameron Tilley	PA	1–4
Ford	XD Falcon	Full Throttle Custom Garage	17	(Australia) Steven Johnson	PM	1
Ford	XD Falcon	Action Motor Industries	71	(Australia) Marcus Zukanovic	PM	1
Ford	XY Falcon GT	Pearcedale Plant Hire	52	(Australia) Dave Hender	PS	6
Ford	XY Falcon GT	Bullet Trailers Racing Team	55	(Australia) John Adams	PS	1–2
Ford	XY Falcon GT HO	Jesus Racing	9	(Australia) Andrew Fisher	PA	1–2
Ford	XY Falcon GT HO	Bedrug / Brad Tilley Auto Garage	28	(Australia) Brad Tilley	PA	2
Ford	Mustang	Bedrug / Gulf Oils Australia	29	(Australia) Jamie Tilley	PA	1–2
Ford	Mustang	Hancock Racing	33	(Australia) Cameron Mason	PA	1–2
Ford	Mustang	Hancock Racing	33	(Australia) Steven Johnson	PA	4
Ford	Mustang	TIFS Third Party Logistics	88	(Australia) Tony Karanfilovski	PA	1–2, 4
Ford	Mustang	Hiller Brothers / JT Electrical	46	(Australia) Leo Tobin	PA	1–4
Holden	HQ Monaro	SNB Berryman Racing	77	(Australia) Warren Trewin	PA	1–4
Holden	Torana A9X	Western General Body Works	3	(Australia) Danny Buzadzic	PA	1–4
Holden	Torana A9X	Multispares Racing	6	(Australia) Ryan Hansford	PM	1–4
Holden	Torana A9X	MoCOMM Motorsport Comms	7	(Australia) Jim Pollicina	PA	1–4
Holden	Torana A9X	Jesus Racing	9	(Australia) Andrew Fisher	PA	3-4
Holden	Torana A9X	Lighthouse Hotel	12	(Australia) Peter Burnitt	PS	2-4
Holden	Torana SL/R	Northside Taxi Management	2	(Australia) Allan Hughes	PA	1
Holden	Torana SL/R 5000	PAYNTER DIXON / PAYCE	18	(Australia) John Bowe	PM	1–4
Holden	VB Commodore	Motorsport Parts Australia	50	(Australia) Gerald McLeod	PA	1–2
Porsche	911 IROC	Chris Meulengraaf	30	(Australia) Chris Meulengraaf	INV	6

== Calendar ==
The series was contested over six rounds:

Rd.	Circuit	Location	State	Date
1	Sydney Motorsport Park	Eastern Creek	New South Wales	4 – 6 March
2	Sydney Motorsport Park	Eastern Creek	New South Wales	27 – 29 May
3	Reid Park Street Circuit	Townsville	Queensland	8 – 10 July
4	Sandown Raceway	Melbourne	Victoria	17 – 18 September
5	Mount Panorama Motor Racing Circuit	Bathurst	New South Wales	11 – 13 November
6	Adelaide Parklands Circuit	Adelaide	South Australia	1–4 December

Each round comprised three Series Races and one Trophy Race.

== Series standings ==
Pos.	Driver	No.	Car	Team	Class	Class Pos.	Points
1	Ryan Hansford	6	Holden Torana A9X	Multispares Racing	Pro Master	1	863
2	John Bowe	18	Holden Torana SL/R 5000	Rare Spares / PAYNTER DIXON	Pro Master	2	839
3	George Miedecke	85	Chevrolet Camaro RS	Daimler Trucks Adelaide/Ausblue	Pro Master	3	751
4	Andrew Fisher	9	Ford Falcon GTHO	Jesus Racing	Pro Am	1	739
5	Steven Johnson	17 & 33	Ford XD Falcon & Ford Mustang	Team Johnson / Kubota & Hancock Racing			612
6	Cameron Tilley	60	Chrysler Valiant Pacer	Anglomoil Superior Lubricants	Pro Am	2	535
7	Jamie Tilley	29	Ford Mustang	Tilley Racing / Bedrug	Pro Am	3	512
8	Ben Dunn	99	Chevrolet Monza	Bacci Fresh			487
9	Jim Pollicina	7	Holden Torana A9X	MoCOMM Motorsport Comms			437
10	Danny Buzadzic	3	Holden Torana A9X	Western General Body Works			416
11	Leo Tobin	46	Ford Mustang	Hillier Brothers / JT Electrical			404
12	Tony Karanfilovski	88	Ford Mustang	TIFS Third Party Logistics			398
13	Warren Trewin	77	Holden Monaro GTS 350	SNB Berryman Racing	Pro Sports	1	329
14	Peter Burnitt	12	Holden Torana SL/R 5000	The Lighthouse Hotel	Pro Sports	2	274
15	Cameron McConville	69	Chevrolet Camaro SS	ACM Auto Parts			272
16	Gerard McLeod	50	Holden Commodore	Motorsport Parts Australia			270
17	Michael Almond	95	Chevrolet Camaro SS	Whiteline Racing			264
18	Adam Bressington	95	Chevrolet Camaro SS	Whiteline Racing			248
19	Cameron Mason	33	Ford Mustang	Hancock Racing			211
20	John Adams	55	Ford Falcon GTHO	Bullet Trailers Racing Team	Pro Sports	3	174
21	Mark King	95	Chevrolet Camaro SS	Daimler Trucks Adelaide/Ausblue			156
22	Marcus Zukanovic	71	Ford Falcon XD	Action Motor Industries			110
23	Jason Palmer	62	BMW E30	Palmers Sales and Marketing			98
24	Brad Tilley	28	Ford Falcon GTHO	BedRug /Brad Tilley Auto			93
25	Chris Meulengraaf	30	Porsche 911 IROC	Chris Meulengraaf			62
26	Paul Freestone	25	Chevrolet Camaro SS	Vawdrey Trailers /Castrol			47
27	Keith Kassulke	52	Ford Falcon XB Hardtop	Wheels Ltd PNG			37
