= 2019 Touring Car Masters =

The 2019 Touring Car Masters was an Australian motor racing series for modified Touring Cars manufactured between 1 January 1963 and 31 December 1980. The series was sanctioned by the Confederation of Australian Motor Sport as an Authorised Series with Touring Car Masters Pty. Ltd appointed as the Category Manager. It was the 13th annual Touring Car Masters series.

The series was won by Steven Johnson driving a Ford Mustang.

== Schedule ==
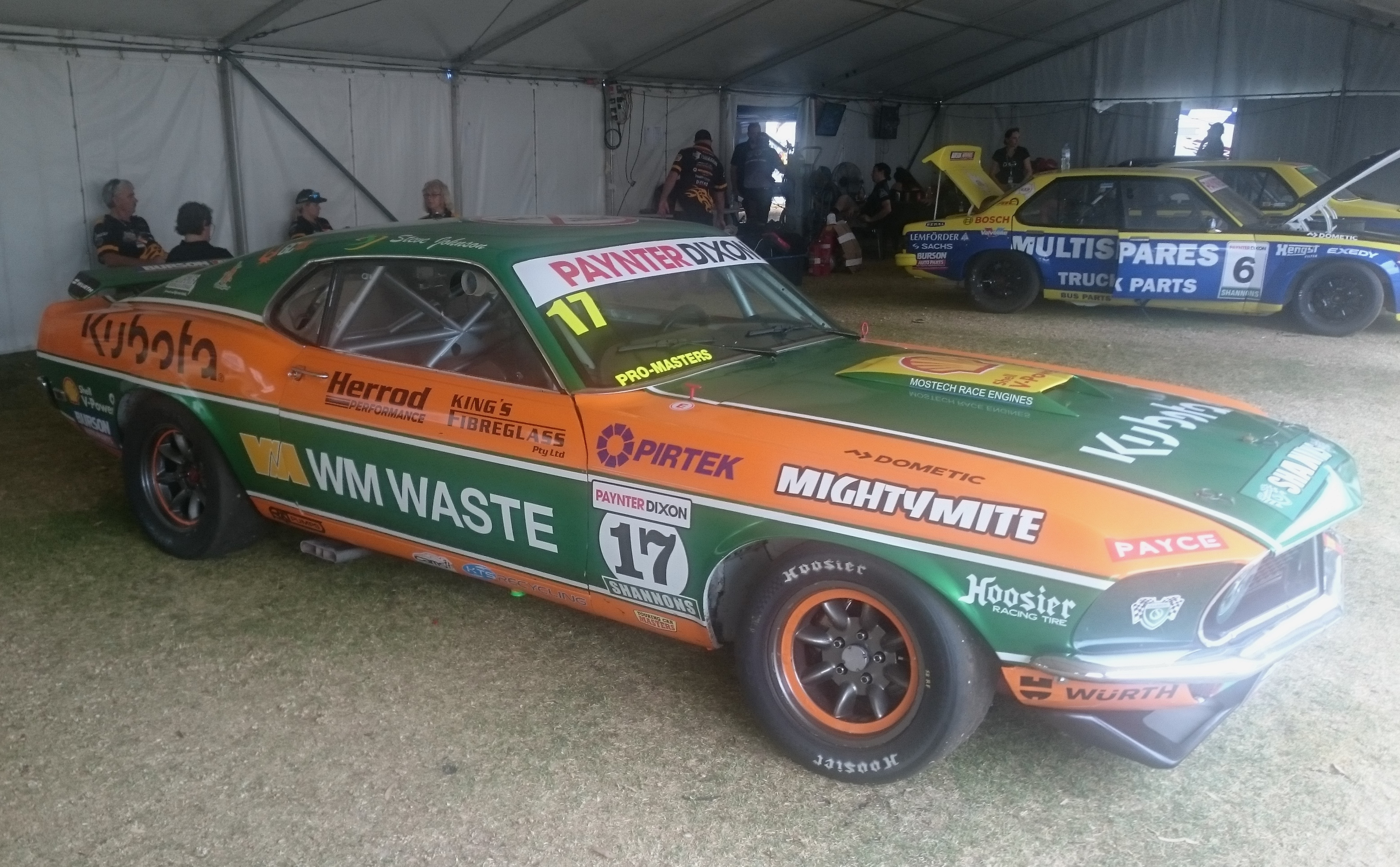
Steven Johnson won the series driving a Ford Mustang

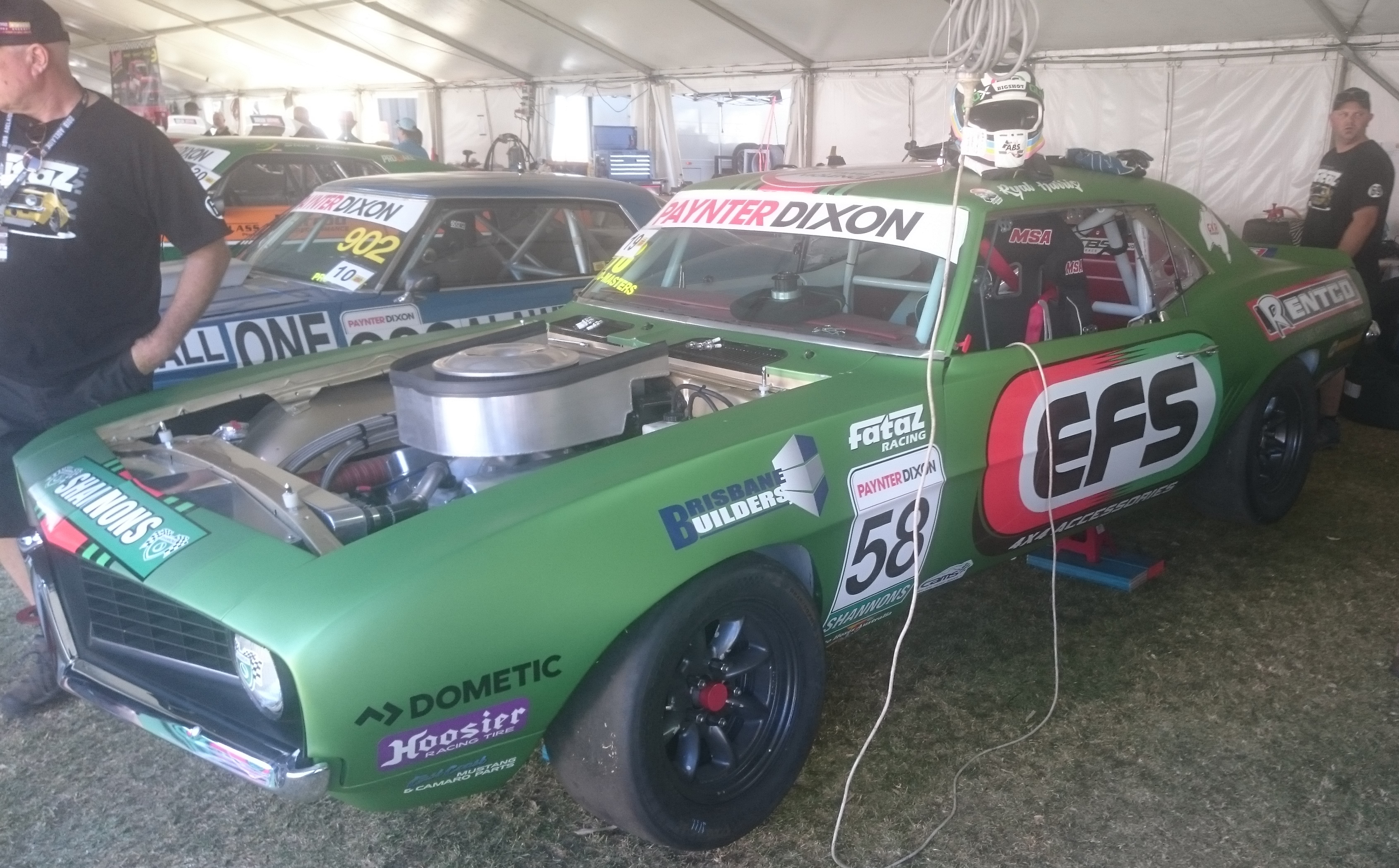
Ryal Harris placed third driving a Chevrolet Camaro

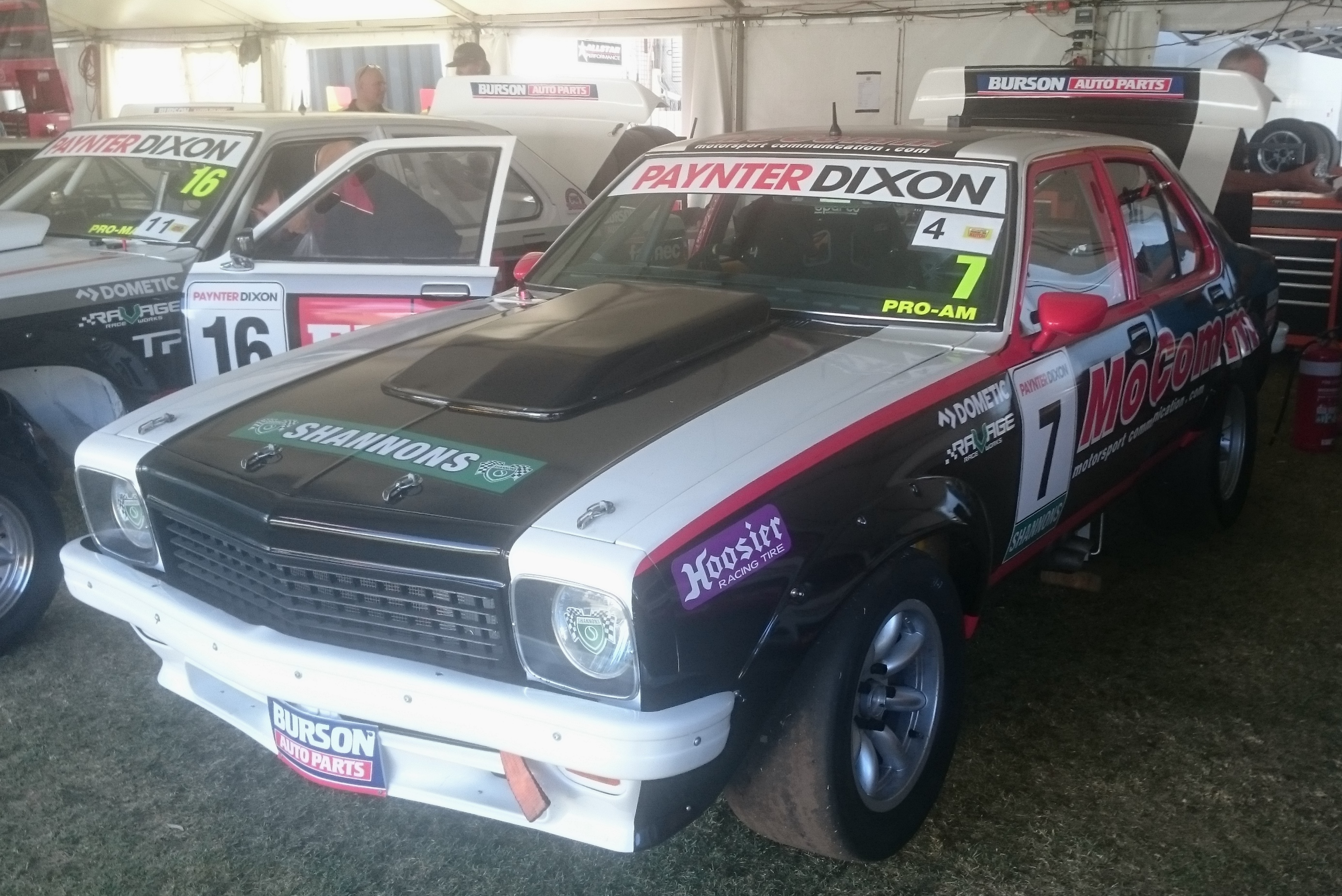
Jim Pollicina placed fifth driving a Holden Torana A9X

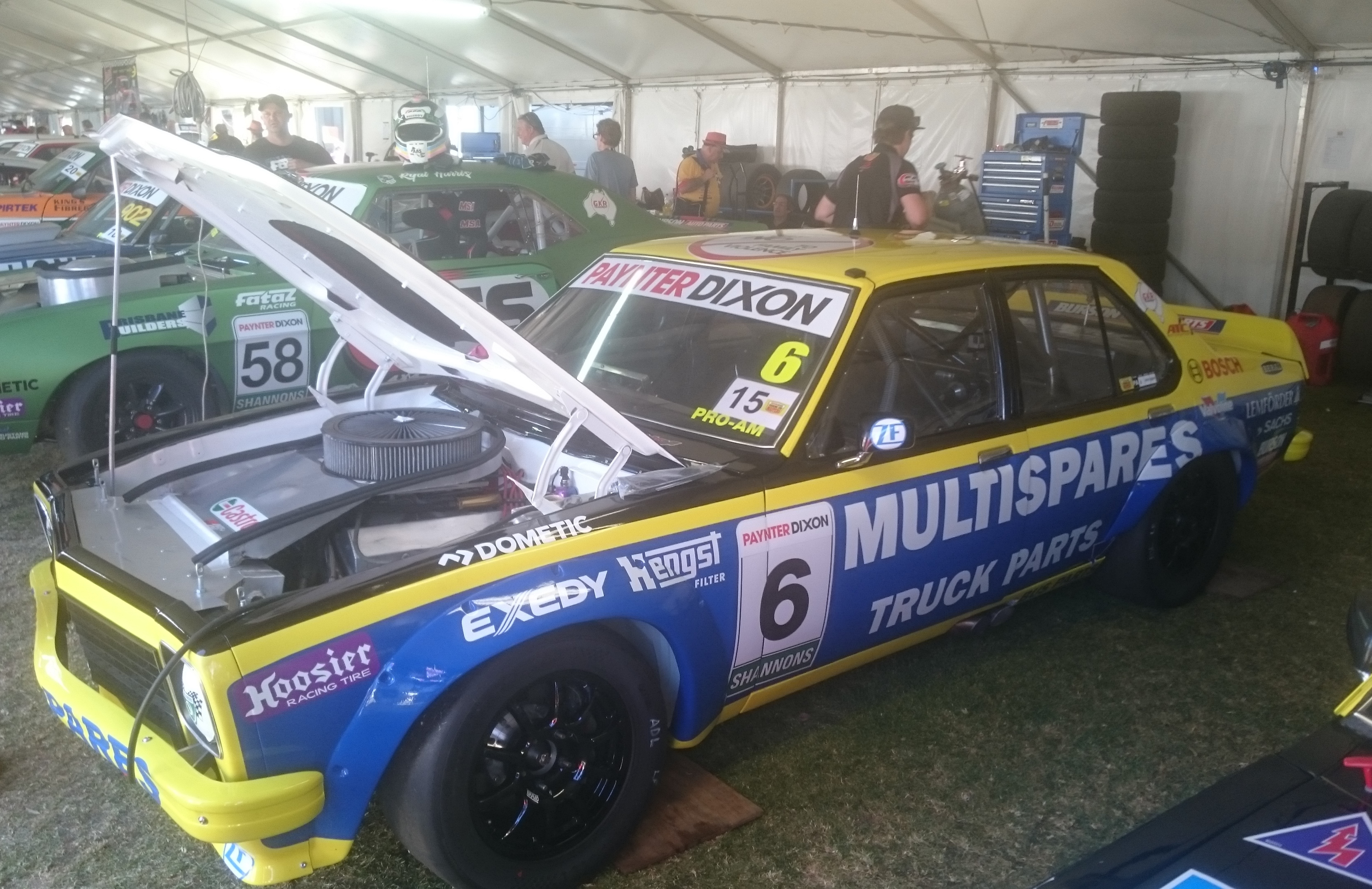
Ryan Hansford placed seventh driving a Holden Torana A9X

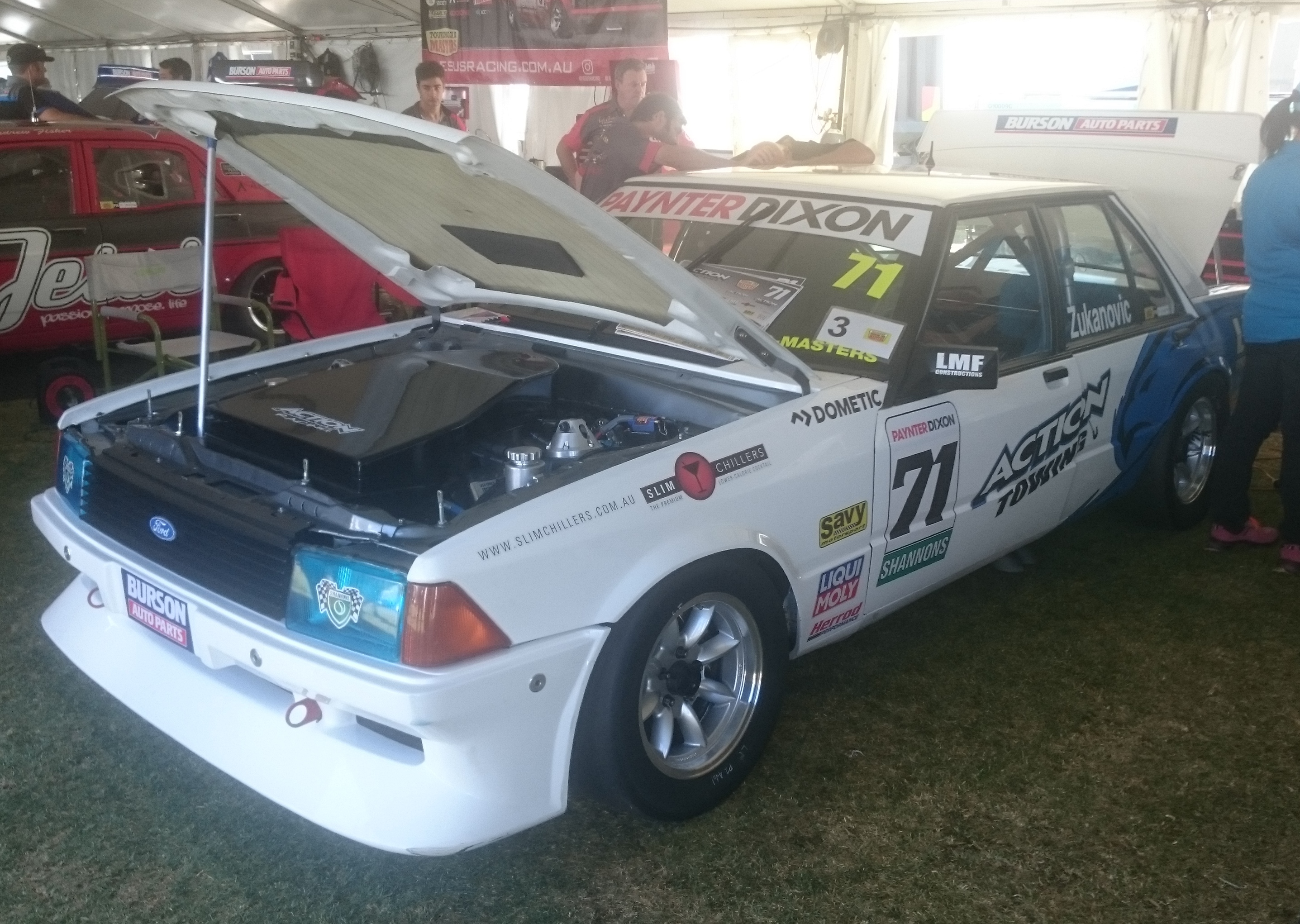
Markus Zukanovic placed eighth driving a Ford Falcon XD

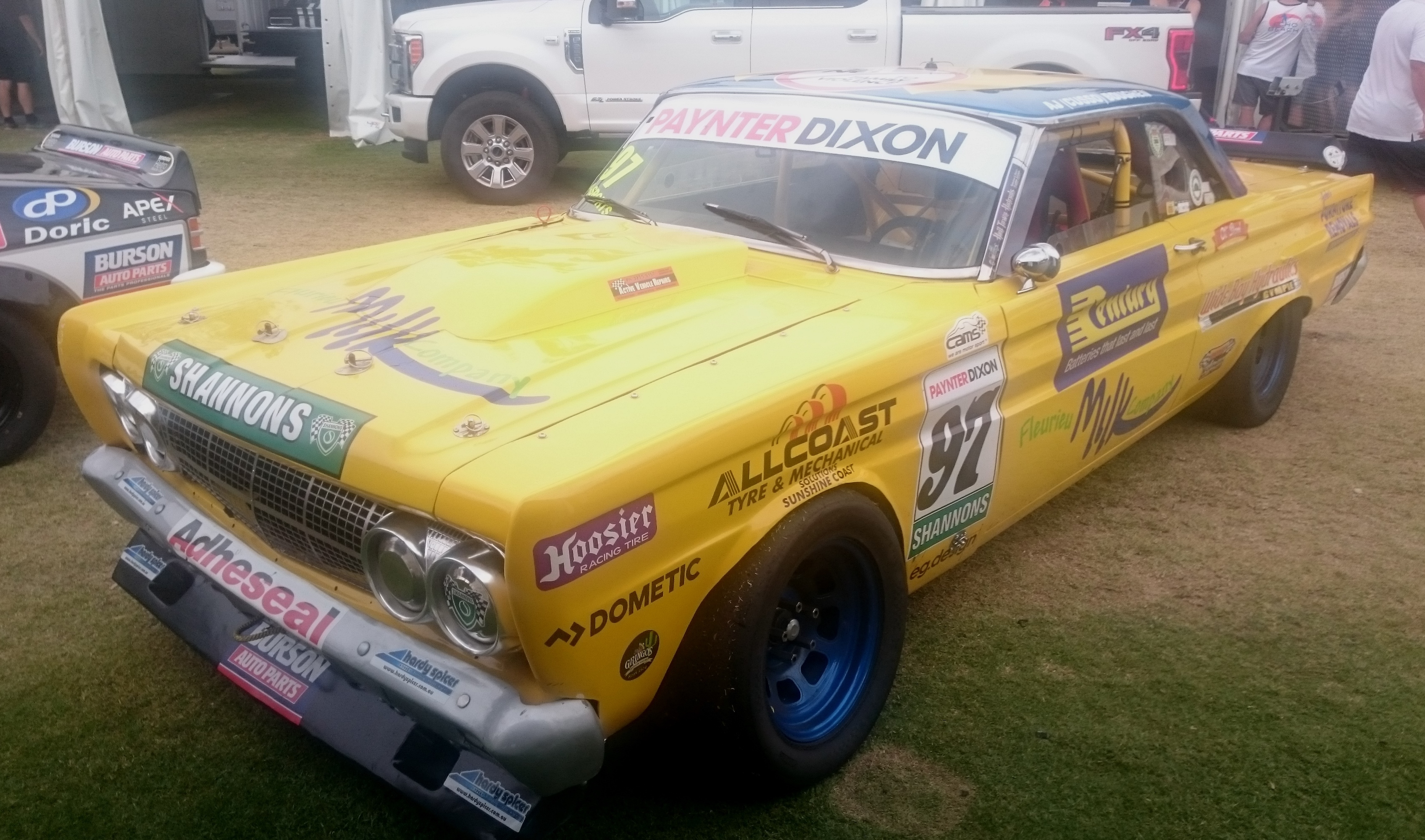
Allen Boughen placed 18th driving a Mercury Comet

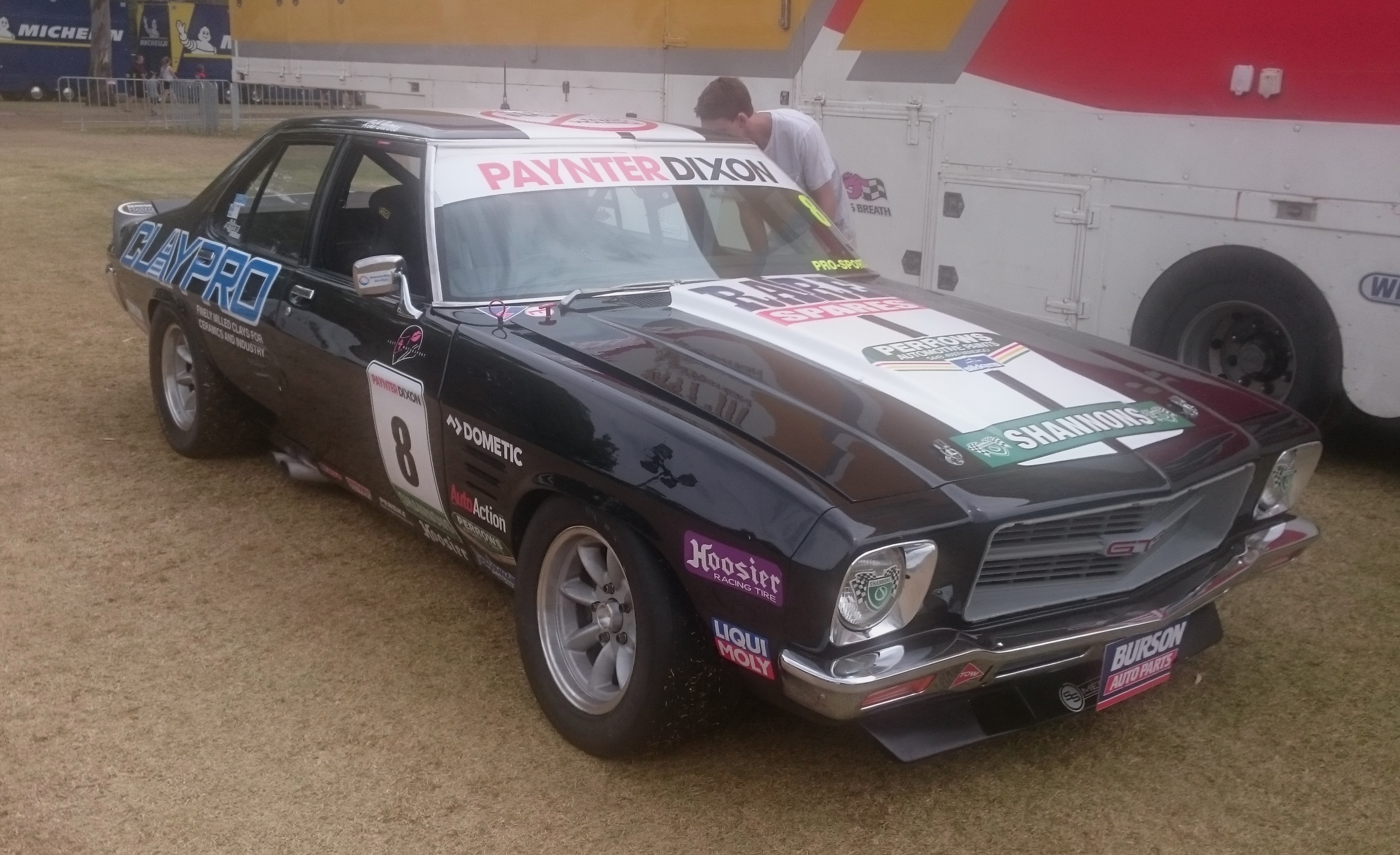
Gary O'Brien placed 25th driving a Holden Monaro GTS

The series was contested over seven rounds:

Round	Circuit	Date
1	Adelaide Parklands Circuit	28 February – 3 March
2	Phillip Island Grand Prix Circuit	12 – 14 April
3	Winton Motor Raceway	24 – 26 May
4	Queensland Raceway	26 – 28 July
5	Sydney Motorsport Park	30 August – 1 September
6	Mount Panorama Circuit	10–13 October
7	Sandown International Motor Raceway	8 – 10 November

== Series standings ==
Pos.	Driver	No.	Car	Class	Points
1	Steven Johnson	17	Ford Mustang	ProMasters	1137
2	John Bowe	18	Holden Torana SL/R	ProMasters	1066
3	Ryal Harris	58	Chevrolet Camaro SS	ProMasters	995
4	Adam Bressington	95	Chevrolet Camaro SS	ProMasters	989
5	Jim Pollicina	7	Holden Torana A9X	ProAm	817
6	Aaron Seton	30	Ford Mustang	ProAm	809
7	Ryan Hansford	5	Holden Torana A9X	ProAm	718
8	Marcus Zukanovic	71	Ford Falcon XD	ProMasters	695
9	Cameron Mason	3 & 33	Ford Mustang	ProAm	659
10	Bruce Williams	5	Holden Torana SL/R	ProAm	632
11	Cameron Tilley	60	Chrysler Valiant Pacer	ProAm	552
12	Rob Hackwood	24	Pontiac Firebird Trans Am	ProAm	524
13	Tony Karanfilovski	88	Ford Mustang	ProAm	441
14	Adam Garwood	85	Chevrolet Camaro RS	ProMasters	431
15	Jeremy Gray	67	Holden Torana A9X	ProAm	349
16	Andrew Fisher	9	Ford XY Falcon GTHO, Holden Torana A9X	ProAm	335
17	Paul Freestone	25	Chevrolet Camaro	ProAm	286
18	Allen Boughen	97	Mercury Comet	ProSport	260
19	Jason Gomersall	35	Holden Torana A9X	ProMasters	248
20	Peter Burnitt	12	Holden Torana A9X	ProSport	211
21	Aaron McGill	75	Ford XW Falcon GT	ProAm	194
22	Bernie Stack	85	Chevrolet Camaro RS	ProAm	193
23	Ben Dunn	99	Chevrolet Monza	ProSport	181
24	Guy Gibbons	20	Holden Monaro GTS	ProSport	168
25	Gary O'Brien	8	Holden Monaro GTS	ProSport	134
26	Sven Burchartz	90	Porsche 911 IROC	ProSport	93
27	Danny Buzadzic	3	Holden Torana A9X	ProSport	81
28	Brett Youlden	56	Holden Monaro GTS	ProAm	77
29	Allan Hughes	50	Holden Torana SL/R	ProSport	74
30	Blu Cannon	65	Ford XY Falcon GT	ProSport	65
31	Leo Tobin	46	Ford Mustang	ProSport	59
32	Thomas Randle	4	Ford Mustang	ProMasters	56
33	Grant Wilson	68	Chevrolet Camaro	ProSport	55
34	Jamie Tilley	29	Ford Mustang	ProSport	47
35	Bob Middleton	85	Chevrolet Camaro RS	ProSport	42
36	Rusty French	4	Ford Mustang	ProAm	36
37	Geoff Emery	2	Holden Torana A9X	ProMasters	33
38	Rohan Little	77	Porsche 911 IROC	ProSport	30
39	Karl Begg	2	Holden Torana A9X	ProSport	30
40	Gavin Bullas	16	Holden Torana A9X	ProMasters	21
41	Geoff Fane	72	Chevrolet Camaro SS	ProSport	0

=== Class winners ===
- The ProMaster class was won by Steve Johnson
- The ProAm class was won by Jim Pollicina
- The ProSport class was won by Allen Boughen
