= 2021 Touring Car Masters =

Australian motorsport season

The 2021 Gulf Western Oils Touring Car Masters was an Australian motor racing competition for touring cars manufactured between 1 January 1963 and the 31 December 1980 and IROC Porsche Class Automobiles, which had been modified in accordance with the series regulations. It was sanctioned by Motorsport Australia as an Authorised Series, with TCM Racing Pty. Ltd appointed as the Category Manager for the series.

John Bowe won the series, his sixth Touring Car Masters title.

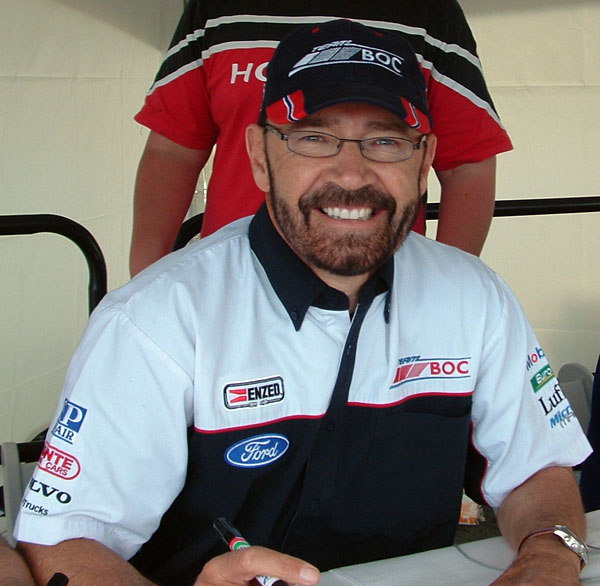
John Bowe (pictured in 2005) won his 6th TCM Title in a Holden Torana SLR 5000.

== Calendar ==
The series was contested over four rounds.

Round	Circuit	City / State	Date
1	(Tasmania) Symmons Plains Raceway	Launceston, Tasmania	24–26 January
2	(New South Wales) Mount Panorama Circuit	Bathurst, New South Wales	26–28 February
3	(New South Wales) Sydney Motorsport Park	Eastern Creek, New South Wales	1–2 May
4	(New South Wales) Mount Panorama Circuit	Bathurst, New South Wales	1–5 December

== Entries ==
=== Teams and Drivers ===
Manufacturer	Model	Team	No.	Driver	Rounds	Class
Chevrolet	Camaro SS	Vawdrey Trailers	25	(Victoria (state)) Paul Freestone	1–2	PA
Chevrolet	Camaro SS	EFS 4x4 Accessories	58	(Queensland) Ryal Harris	2–3	PM
Chevrolet	Camaro SS	Whiteline Racing	95	(New South Wales) Mark King	1–3	PM
Chevrolet	Camaro SS	Whiteline Racing	95	(New South Wales) George Miedecke	4	PM
Chevrolet	Camaro RS	Whiteline Racing	85	(Tasmania) Adam Garwood	1–2	PA
Chevrolet	Camaro RS	Whiteline Racing	85	(New South Wales) Adam Bressington	3–4	PM
Chrysler	Valiant Pacer	ANGLOMOIL Lubricants	60	(New South Wales) Cameron Tilley	All	PA
Ford	Capri	Giraffe Civil Contracting	2	(Tasmania) Greg Garwood	1	INV
Ford	Capri	JMG Racing	67	(New South Wales) Jeremy Gray	2–3	PA
Ford	XD Falcon	Full Throttle Custom Garages	17	(Queensland) Steven Johnson	All	PM
Ford	XD Falcon	Action Motor Industries	71	(Victoria (state)) Marcus Zukanovic	All	PM
Ford	XW Falcon	Lindway Builders	74	(Victoria (state)) Wayne Mercer	2	PA
Ford	XW Falcon	McGill Motorsport	75	(Victoria (state)) Aaron McGill	2	PA
Ford	XY Falcon	Jesus Racing	9	(New South Wales) Andrew Fisher	All	PA
Ford	XY Falcon	Brad Tilley Garage	28	(New South Wales) Brad Tilley	4	PA
Ford	XY Falcon	Bullet Trains Racing Team	55	(Victoria (state)) John Adams	3	PA
Ford	Mustang	Gulf Oil	29	(New South Wales) Jamie Tilley	2–3	PA
Ford	Mustang Trans Am	Toronto Hotel	33	(New South Wales) Cameron Mason	2–3	PA
Ford	Mustang Trans Am	TIFS	88	(New South Wales) Tony Karanfilovski	All	PA
Holden	VB Commodore	Motorsport Parts Australia	50	(Victoria (state)) Gerard McLeod	All	PA
Holden	Torana A9X	Northside Taxi Management	2	(Queensland) Allan Hughes	3	PA
Holden	Torana A9X	Western General Body Works	3	(Victoria (state)) Danny Buzadzic	4	PA
Holden	Torana A9X	Multispares Racing	6	(Queensland) Ryan Hansford	All	PA
Holden	Torana A9X	MOCOMM Motorsport	7	(New South Wales) Jim Pollicina	All	PM
Holden	Torana A9X	MOCOMM Motorsport	15	(Victoria (state)) Dean Lillie	4	PA
Holden	Torana A9X	The Lighthouse Hotel	12	(New South Wales) Peter Burnitt	All	PS
Holden	Torana SL/R	PAYNTER DIXON	18	(Victoria (state)) John Bowe	All	PM
Porsche	911 IROC	Bedrug / Shell Oil	8	(New South Wales) Terry Lawlor	4	IROC
Porsche	911 IROC	Kalus Kenny Intelex Lawyers-Advisors	90	(Victoria (state)) Sven Burchartz	4	IROC

=== Key ===
Symbol	Meaning
PM	Pro Masters
PA	Pro Am
PS	Pro-Sport
INV	Invitational
IROC	International Race of Champions

== Series summary ==
The series was won by John Bowe, in what was his sixth Touring Car Masters title win and his first since 2016. Driving a Holden Torana, Bowe won the final round of the series at Mount Panorama Circuit, Bathurst, New South Wales to finish the season on 597 points. Ryan Hansford placed second on 547 points with Steven Johnson third on 497 points. Bowe completed all races held during the series with one win, at Symmons Plains, earlier in the season.

== Series results ==
Round	Race	Circuit	Pole position	Fastest Lap	Winning driver	Winning team	Ref
1	TPH	(Tasmania) Symmons Plains Raceway	(Victoria (state)) John Bowe	(Tasmania) Adam Garwood	(Victoria (state)) Marcus Zukanovic	Action Motor Industries	
1	1	(Tasmania) Symmons Plains Raceway		(Victoria (state)) John Bowe	(Tasmania) Adam Garwood	Whiteline Racing	
1	2	(Tasmania) Symmons Plains Raceway		race abandoned (Note: Race was suspended due to a red flag incident when Steven Johnson's Ford XD Falcon sheared a wheel off.)			
1	3	(Tasmania) Symmons Plains Raceway		(Victoria (state)) John Bowe	(Victoria (state)) John Bowe	PAYNTER DIXON	
2	TPH	(New South Wales) Mount Panorama Circuit	(Tasmania) Adam Garwood	(Queensland) Ryal Harris	(New South Wales) Cameron Tilley	ANGLOMOIL Lubricants	
2	1	(New South Wales) Mount Panorama Circuit		(Victoria (state)) Marcus Zukanovic	(Queensland) Ryal Harris	EFS 4x4 Accessories	
2	2	(New South Wales) Mount Panorama Circuit		(Queensland) Ryan Hansford	(Queensland) Ryal Harris	EFS 4x4 Accessories	
2	3	(New South Wales) Mount Panorama Circuit		(Queensland) Ryan Hansford	(Queensland) Ryan Hansford	Multispares Racing	
3	TPH	(New South Wales) Sydney Motorsport Park	(Queensland) Ryan Hansford	(Victoria (state)) John Bowe	(New South Wales) Jim Pollicina	MOCOMM Motorsport	
3	1	(New South Wales) Sydney Motorsport Park		(Queensland) Ryan Hansford	(Queensland) Ryan Hansford	Multispares Racing	
3	2	(New South Wales) Sydney Motorsport Park		(Queensland) Ryan Hansford	(Queensland) Ryan Hansford	Multispares Racing	
3	3	(New South Wales) Sydney Motorsport Park		(Queensland) Steven Johnson	(Queensland) Steven Johnson	Full Throttle Custom Garage	
4	TPH	(New South Wales) Mount Panorama Circuit	(Queensland) Steven Johnson	(Victoria (state)) Marcus Zukanovic	(Victoria (state)) Marcus Zukanovic	Action Motor Industries	
4	1	(New South Wales) Mount Panorama Circuit		(Victoria (state)) Marcus Zukanovic	(Queensland) Steven Johnson	Full Throttle Custom Garage	
4	2	(New South Wales) Mount Panorama Circuit		(Queensland) Steven Johnson	(Queensland) Steven Johnson	Full Throttle Custom Garage	
4	3	(New South Wales) Mount Panorama Circuit		(Victoria (state)) Dean Lillie	(Victoria (state)) Dean Lillie	MOCOMM Motorsport	

== Series standings ==
Pos	Driver	Car	Sym	Bat	Syd	Bat	Total
1	John Bowe	Holden Torana SL/R	136	168	141	152	597
2	Ryan Hansford	Holden Torana A9X	114	125	196	112	547
3	Steven Johnson	Ford XD Falcon	120	92	175	110	497
4	Cameron Tilley	Chrysler Valiant Pacer	113	143	142	98	496
5	Marcus Zukanovic	Ford XD Falcon	107	180	111	76	474
6	Jim Pollicina	Holden Torana A9X	50	140	119	116	425
7	Tony Karanfilovski	Ford Mustang	82	107	101	69	359
8	Peter Burnitt	Holden Torana A9X	77	84	80	93	334
9	Ryal Harris	Chevrolet Camaro SS	–	196	136	–	332
10	Cameron Mason	Ford Mustang	–	89	87	131	307
11	Adam Bressington	Chevrolet Camaro	–	–	155	142	297
12	Andrew Fisher	Ford XY Falcon GTHO	47	143	82	20	292
13	Mark King	Chevrolet Camaro SS	59	122	85	–	266
14	Jamie Tilley	Ford Mustang	–	61	161	39	261
15	Gerard McLeod	Holden VB Commodore	89	–	122	10	221
16	Adam Garwood	Chevrolet Camaro RS	136	62	–	–	198
17	Jeremy Gray	Ford Capri Perana	–	77	72	0	149
18	Dean Lillie	Holden Torana	–	–	–	147	147
19	Wayne Mercer	Ford XY Falcon GTHO	–	86	–	–	86
20	Aaron McGill	Ford XW Falcon GT	–	85	–	–	85
21	Sven Burchartz	Porsche 911	–	–	–	76	76
22	George Miedecke	Chevrolet Camaro SS	–	–	–	68	68
23	John Adams	Ford XY Falcon GTHO	–	–	67	0	67
24	Brad Tilley	Ford XY Falcon	–	–	–	60	60
25	Paul Freestone	Chevrolet Camaro	56	–	–	–	56
26	Danny Buzadzic	Holden Torana A9X	–	–	–	35	35
27	Allan Hughes	Holden Torana A9X	–	–	25	–	25
