= 2018 Touring Car Masters =

Australian motor racing series

The 2018 Touring Car Masters was an Australian motor racing series for Touring Cars manufactured between 1 January 1963 and 31 December 1978, IROC Porsche automobiles and Trans Am Class automobiles. It was the twelfth annual Touring Car Masters series. Each car competing in the series was allocated into one the following classes: Pro Masters, Pro Am, Pro Sport, IROC (Porsche), Trans Am.

The series was won by Steve Johnson driving a Ford Mustang.

== Teams and drivers ==
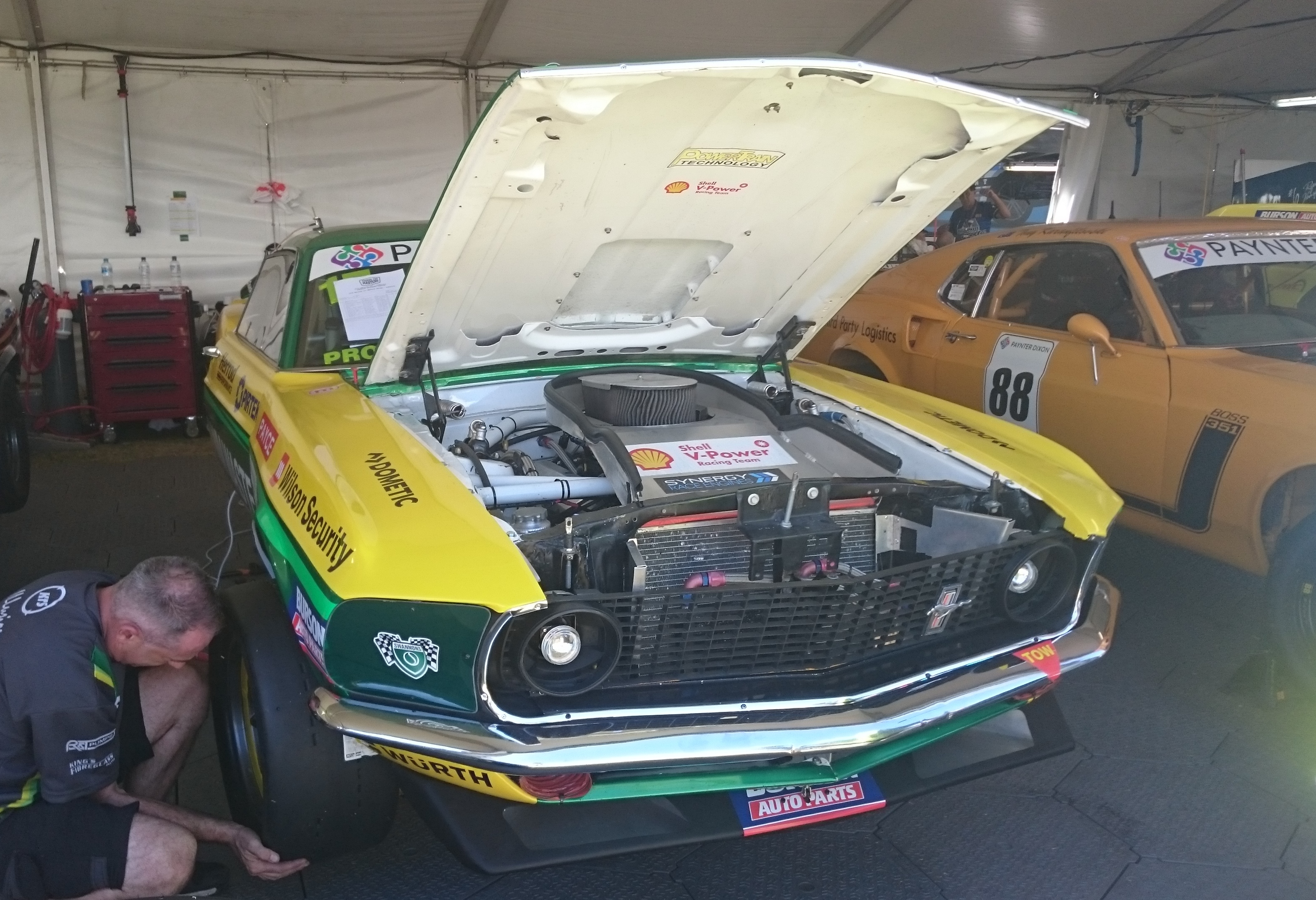
Steven Johnson won the series in a 1969 Ford Mustang

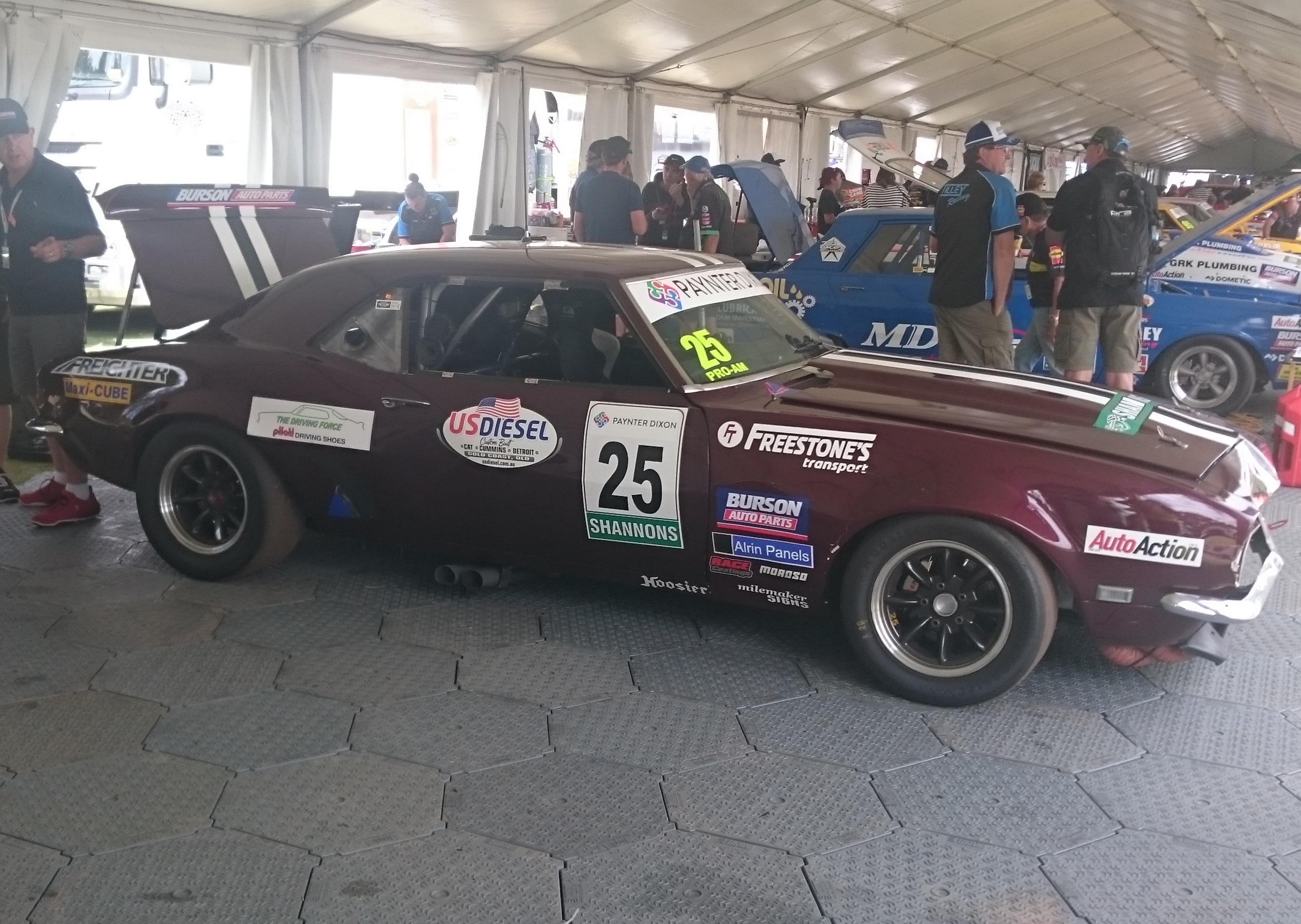
Paul Freestone placed 17th driving a 1968 Chevrolet Camaro

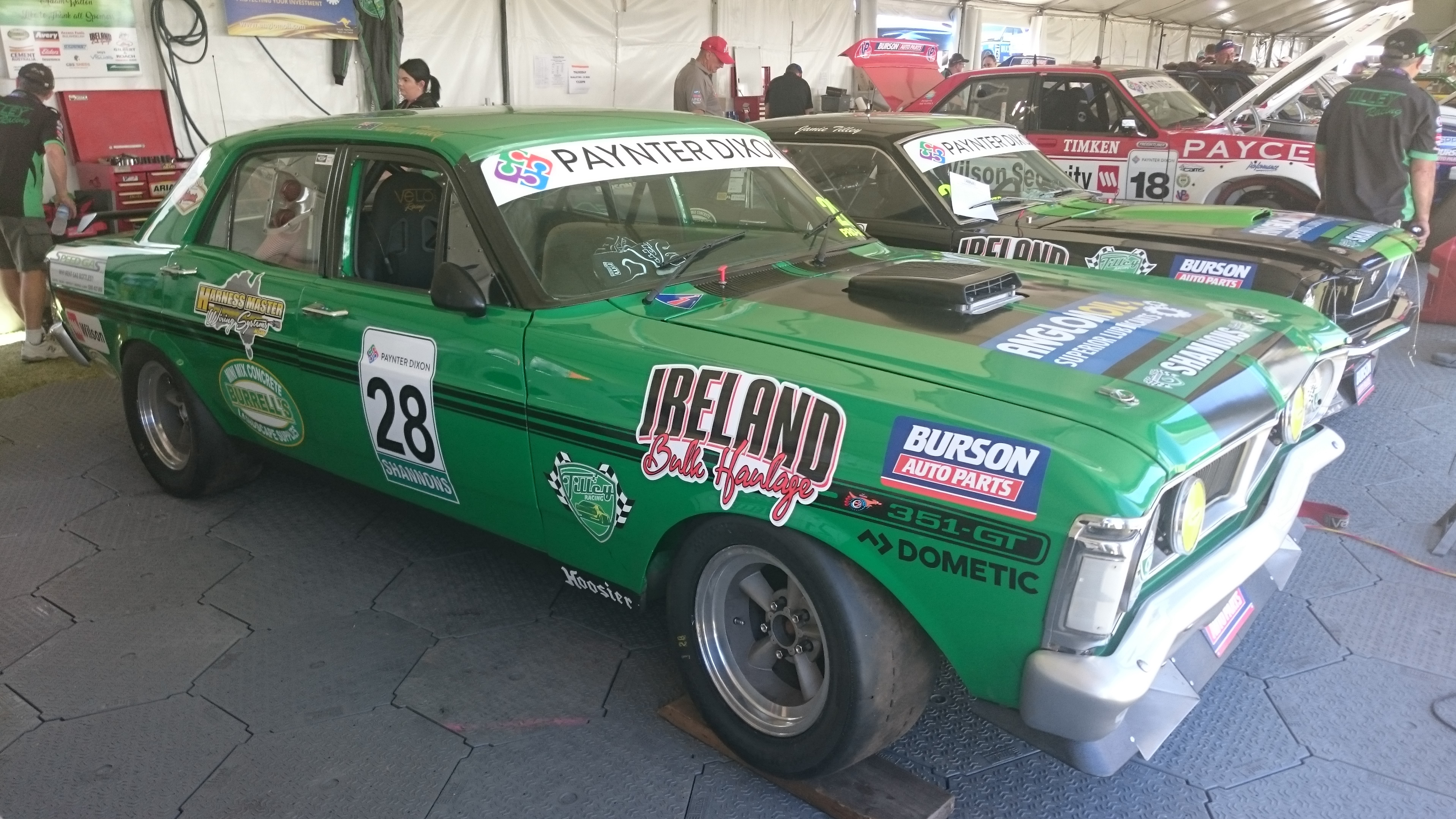
Brad Tilley placed 18th driving a Ford Falcon GTHO

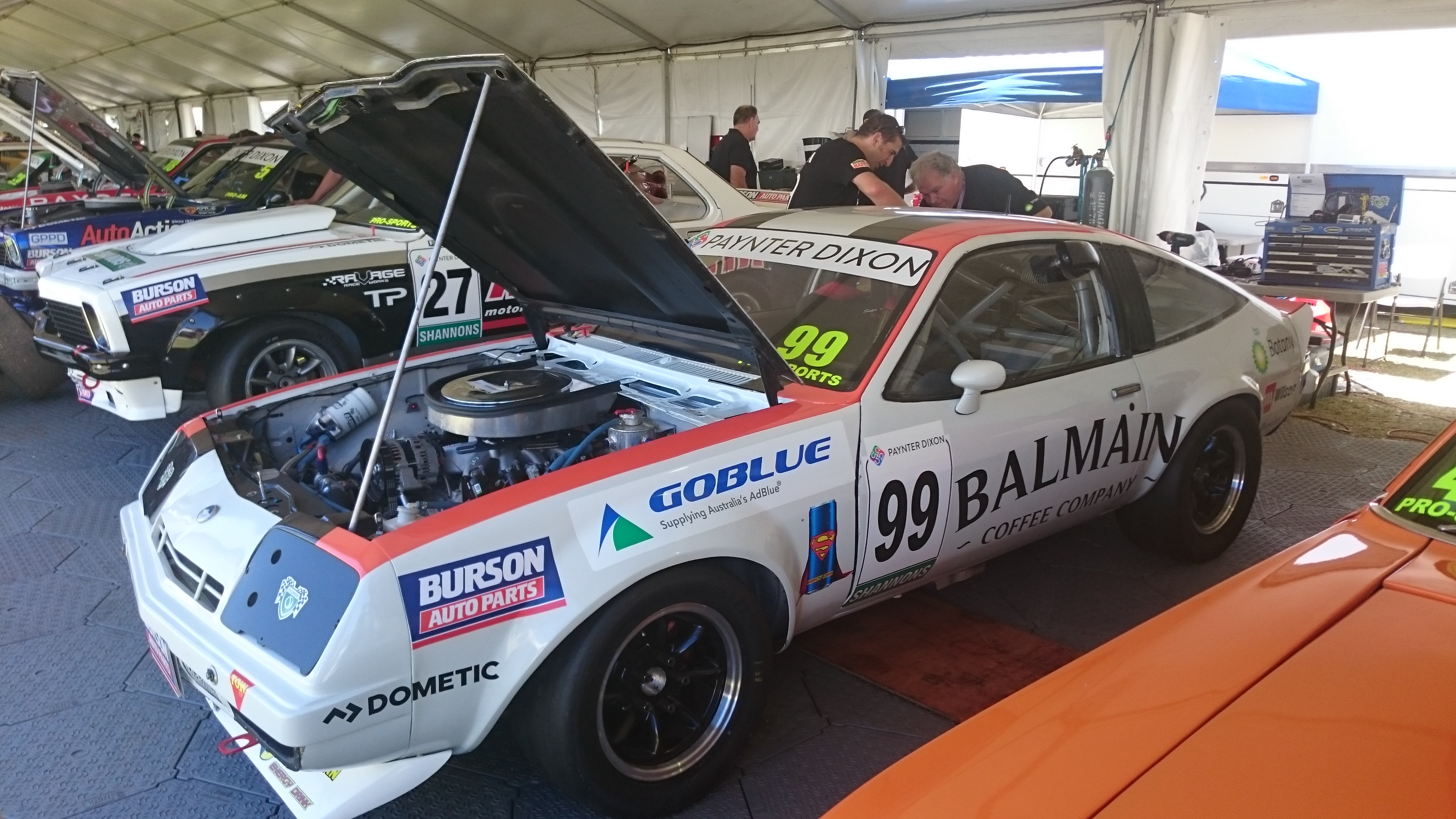
Ben Dunn placed 24th in the series driving a Chevrolet Monza 2+2

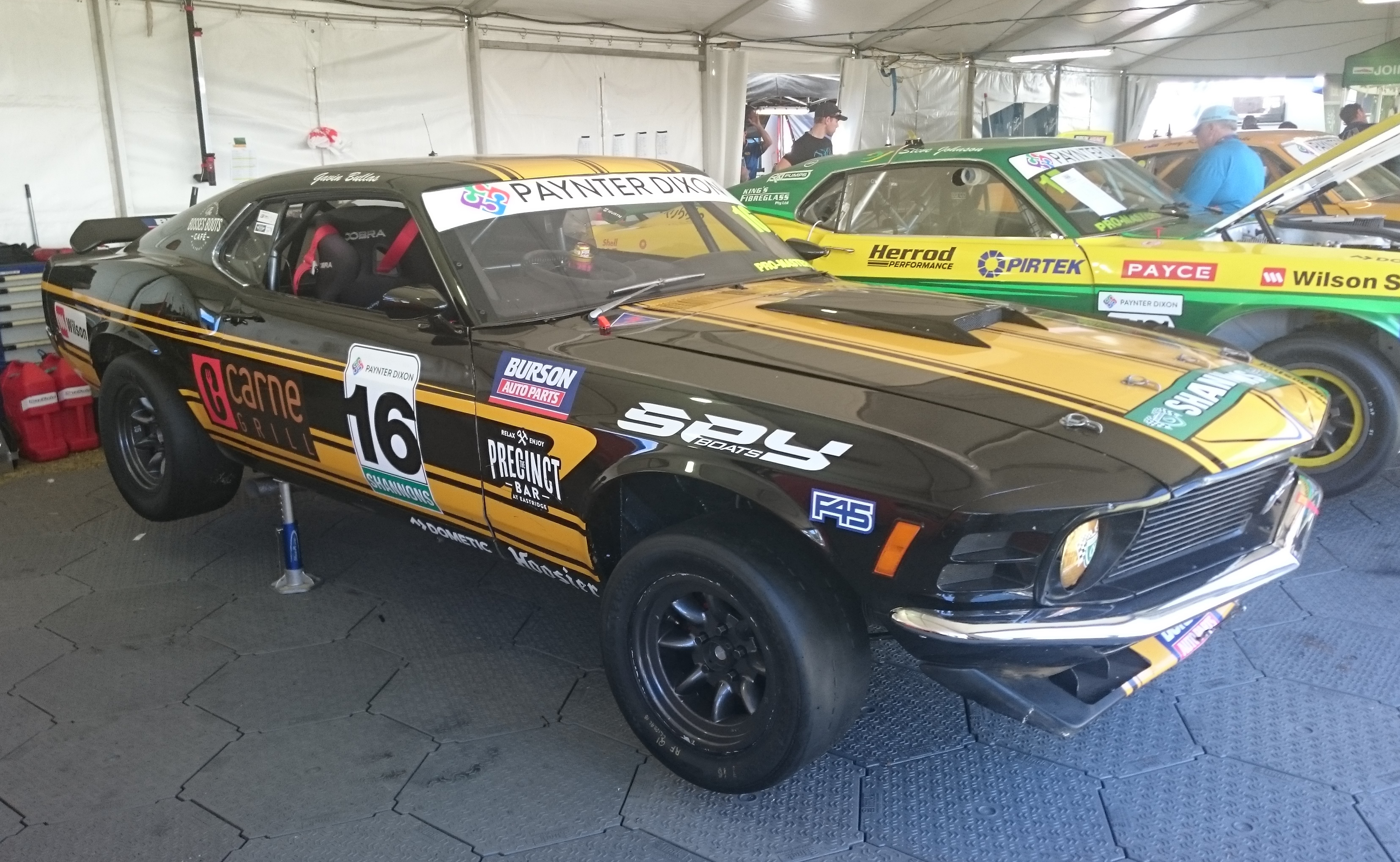
Gavin Bullas placed 28th driving a 1970 Ford Mustang

The following teams and drivers contested the 2018 Touring Car Masters.

Entrant	Vehicle	Class	No	Driver	Rounds
SportsMed SA	1974 Porsche 911 IROC	IROC	1	(Australia) Greg Keen	1
Shannons Insurance	1963 Ford Falcon Sprint	Pro-Master	2	(New Zealand) Jim Richards	4
F3 Motor Auctions	1969 Ford Mustang Fastback	Pro-Master	3	(Australia) Cameron Mason	3
Northern BM	Ford Escort RS 1600	Pro-Sport	4	(Australia) Nathan Geier	3
ACDelco	1974 Holden Torana SL/R 5000	Pro-Am	5	(Australia) Bruce Williams	1, 3–5
Multispares Racing	1974 Holden Torana SL/R 5000	Pro-Am	6	(Australia) Ryan Hansford	1–5
MOCOMM Motorsport Communication	1974 Holden Torana SL/R 5000	Pro-Sport	7	(Australia) Jim Policina	5
MOCOMM Motorsport Communication	1974 Holden Torana SL/R 5000	Pro-Sport	27	(Australia) Jim Policina	1–4
Bendigo Retro Muscle Cars	Holden Monaro GTS Coupe	Pro-Sport	8	(Australia) Rob Burns	3
Jesus Racing	1971 Ford Falcon XY GTHO	Pro-Am	9	(Australia) Andrew Fisher	2–4
Pitman Trucks / Halkin Developments	Ford Falcon XA GT	Pro-Sport	11	(Australia) Graham Crawford	3
Carne Grill / Precinct Bar	1970 Ford Mustang Fastback	Pro-Master	16	(Australia) Gavin Bullas	1–2
Team Johnson	1969 Ford Mustang Fastback	Pro-Master	17	(Australia) Steven Johnson	1–5
John Bowe Racing	1974 Holden Torana SL/R 5000	Pro-Master	18	(Australia) John Bowe	1–5
Tincone Industrial Services	Holden Monaro GTS Coupe	Pro-Sport	19	(Australia) Darren Beale	5
Wellpro Racing	Ford Mustang Coupe	Pro-Sport	21	(Australia) Robert Hackwood	1
Wellpro Racing	Pontiac Firebird Trans Am	Pro-Sport	21	(Australia) Robert Hackwood	5
Maxi-Trans Trailers	Holden Monaro GTS Coupe	Pro-Sport	22	(Australia) Nigel Benson	1
Maxi-Trans Trailers	1968 Chevrolet Camaro SS	Pro-Am	25	(Australia) Paul Freestone	1–2
Tilley Auto Garage	1971 Ford Falcon XY GTHO	Pro-Am	28	(Australia) Brad Tilley	1
Tilley Auto Garage	Ford Mustang Coupe	Pro-Sport	29	(Australia) Jamie Tilley	1
Tilley Auto Garage	1969 Valiant Pacer	Pro-Am	60	(Australia) Cameron Tilley	1–5
Matt Stone Racing	1974 Holden Torana SL/R 5000	Pro-Master	35	(Australia) Jason Gomersall	1–5
Hotchkin Racing	1971 Ford Falcon XY GTHO	Pro-Sport	44	(Australia) Brett Hotchkin	3
Hotchkin Racing	1971 Ford Falcon XY GTHO	Pro-Sport	48	(Australia) Rod Hotchkin	3
THD Motorsport	1969 Ford Boss Mustang	Pro-Sport	46	(Australia) Leo Tobin	1–4
Graham Alexander	1969 Chevrolet Camaro SS	Pro-Sport	57	(Australia) Graham Alexander	3
Cannon Trailers	1971 Ford Falcon XY GTHO	Pro-Sport	65	(Australia) Blu Cannon	3
Fataz Competition Engines	1969 Chevrolet Camaro SS	Pro-Sport	69	(Australia) Ian Woodward	3–5
Lyndways Builders	1971 Ford Falcon XY GTHO	Pro-Am	74	(Australia) Wayne Mercer	5
Ranger Lifting-Rigging-Safety	1971 Ford Falcon XY GT	Pro-Am	75	(Australia) Aaron McGill	5
Whiteline Racing	1970 Chevrolet Camaro RS	Pro-Master	85	(Australia) Mark King	1–5
Whiteline Racing	1969 Chevrolet Camaro SS	Pro-Master	95	(Australia) Adam Bressington	1–5
TIFS - Warehousing & Distribution	1969 Ford Mustang Trans Am	Pro-Am	88	(Australia) Tony Karanfilovski	1, 3–5
Johns Furniture Removals	1963 Mercury Comet	Pro-Sport	97	(Australia) Allen Boughen	4–5
Balmain Coffee Company	1975 Chevrolet Monza 2+2	Pro-Sport	99	(Australia) Ben Dunn	1, 4

== Calendar ==
Rnd		Circuit	Date	Pole position	Fastest lap	Winning driver	Winning team
1	R1	Adelaide Street Circuit (Adelaide, South Australia)	1–4 March	(Australia) Steven Johnson	(Australia) John Bowe	(Australia) Adam Bressington	Whiteline Racing
1	R2	Adelaide Street Circuit (Adelaide, South Australia)	1–4 March		(Australia) John Bowe	(Australia) Steven Johnson	Team Johnson
1	R3	Adelaide Street Circuit (Adelaide, South Australia)	1–4 March		(Australia) Steven Johnson	(Australia) John Bowe	John Bowe Racing
1	R4	Adelaide Street Circuit (Adelaide, South Australia)	1–4 March		(Australia) Steven Johnson	(Australia) John Bowe	John Bowe Racing
2	R1	Symmons Plains Raceway (Launceston, Tasmania)	6–8 April	(Australia) John Bowe	(Australia) John Bowe	(Australia) Jason Gomersall	Matt Stone Racing
2	R2	Symmons Plains Raceway (Launceston, Tasmania)	6–8 April		(Australia) Steven Johnson	(Australia) Steven Johnson	Team Johnson
2	R3	Symmons Plains Raceway (Launceston, Tasmania)	6–8 April		(Australia) John Bowe	(Australia) Steven Johnson	Team Johnson
2	R4	Symmons Plains Raceway (Launceston, Tasmania)	6–8 April		(Australia) Steven Johnson	(Australia) Steven Johnson	Team Johnson
3	R1	(Victoria (state)) Winton Motor Raceway (Benalla, Victoria)	18–20 May	(Australia) Steven Johnson	(Australia) John Bowe	(Australia) John Bowe	John Bowe Racing
3	R2	(Victoria (state)) Winton Motor Raceway (Benalla, Victoria)	18–20 May		(Australia) Steven Johnson	(Australia) Steven Johnson	Team Johnson
3	R3	(Victoria (state)) Winton Motor Raceway (Benalla, Victoria)	18–20 May		(Australia) Steven Johnson	(Australia) Steven Johnson	Team Johnson
3	R4	(Victoria (state)) Winton Motor Raceway (Benalla, Victoria)	18–20 May		(Australia) John Bowe	(Australia) Adam Bressington	Whiteline Racing
4	R1	Hidden Valley Raceway (Darwin, Northern Territory)	15–17 June	(Australia) Steven Johnson	(Australia) Mark King	(Australia) Mark King	Whiteline Racing
4	R2	Hidden Valley Raceway (Darwin, Northern Territory)	15–17 June		(Australia) Steven Johnson	(Australia) Steven Johnson	Team Johnson
4	R3	Hidden Valley Raceway (Darwin, Northern Territory)	15–17 June		(Australia) Steven Johnson	(Australia) Steven Johnson	Team Johnson
4	R4	Hidden Valley Raceway (Darwin, Northern Territory)	15–17 June		(Australia) John Bowe	(Australia) John Bowe	John Bowe Racing
5	R1	Townsville Street Circuit (Townsville, Queensland)	6–8 July	(Australia) Steven Johnson	(Australia) Steven Johnson	(Australia) Steven Johnson	Team Johnson
5	R2	Townsville Street Circuit (Townsville, Queensland)	6–8 July		(Australia) John Bowe	(Australia) Steven Johnson	Team Johnson
5	R3	Townsville Street Circuit (Townsville, Queensland)	6–8 July		(Australia) Ryan Hansford	(Australia) Ryan Hansford	Multispares Racing
6	R1	(Victoria (state)) Sandown Raceway (Melbourne, Victoria)	14–16 September	(Australia) Steven Johnson	(Australia) Steven Johnson	(Australia) Steven Johnson	Team Johnson
6	R2	(Victoria (state)) Sandown Raceway (Melbourne, Victoria)	14–16 September	Race cancelled			
6	R3	(Victoria (state)) Sandown Raceway (Melbourne, Victoria)	14–16 September		(Australia) John Bowe	(Australia) Steven Johnson	Team Johnson
7	R1	Mount Panorama Circuit (Bathurst, New South Wales)	4–7 October	(Australia) Steven Johnson	(Australia) Steven Johnson	(Australia) Steven Johnson	Team Johnson
7	R2	Mount Panorama Circuit (Bathurst, New South Wales)	4–7 October		(Australia) Jason Gomersall	(Australia) Brad Tilley	Tilley Auto Garage
7	R3	Mount Panorama Circuit (Bathurst, New South Wales)	4–7 October		(Australia) Steven Johnson	(Australia) Steven Johnson	Team Johnson
7	R4	Mount Panorama Circuit (Bathurst, New South Wales)	4–7 October		(Australia) John Bowe	(Australia) John Bowe	John Bowe Racing
8	R1	Newcastle Street Circuit (Newcastle, New South Wales)	23–25 November	(Australia) John Bowe	(Australia) Steven Johnson	(Australia) Brad Tilley	Tilley Auto Garage
8	R2	Newcastle Street Circuit (Newcastle, New South Wales)	23–25 November		(Australia) John Bowe	(Australia) John Bowe	John Bowe Racing
8	R3	Newcastle Street Circuit (Newcastle, New South Wales)	23–25 November		(Australia) John Bowe	(Australia) John Bowe	John Bowe Racing
8	R4	Newcastle Street Circuit (Newcastle, New South Wales)	23–25 November		(Australia) John Bowe	(Australia) Adam Bressington	Whiteline Racing

== Series standings ==
Pos.	Driver	No.	Car	Class	Points
1	Steven Johnson	17	Ford Mustang	ProMasters	1390
2	John Bowe	18	Holden Torana SL/R	ProMasters	1331
3	Adam Bressington	95	Chevrolet Camaro SS	ProMasters	1187
4	Jason Gomersall	35	Holden Torana A9X	ProMasters	1016
5	Mark King	85	Chevrolet Camaro RS	ProMasters	951
6	Cameron Tilley	60	Chrysler Valiant Pacer	ProAm	877
7	Ryan Hansford	6	Holden Torana SL/R	ProAm	870
8	Tony Karanfilovski	88	Ford Mustang	ProAm	839
9	Jim Pollicina	27 & 7	Holden Torana A9X	ProSport	790
10	Andrew Fisher	9	Ford Falcon XY GTHO	ProAm	752
11	Leo Tobin	46	Ford Boss Mustang	ProSport	647
12	Bruce Williams	5	Holden Torana SL/R	ProAm	522
13	Cameron Mason	3	Ford Mustang	ProAm	368
14	Rob Hackwood	21	Ford Mustang; Pontiac Firebird Trans Am	ProAm	367
15	Ian Woodward	69	Chevrolet Camaro SS	ProSport	358
16	Paul Freestone	25	Chevrolet Camaro	ProAm	352
17	Jamie Tilley	29	Ford Mustang	ProSport	338
18	Brad Tilley	28	Ford Falcon XY GTHO	ProAm	328
19	Jim Richards	2	Ford Falcon Sprint	ProMasters	286
20	Aaron McGill	75	Ford Falcon XY GT	ProAm	239
21	Allen Boughen	97	Mercury Comet	ProSport	234
22	Wayne Mercer	74	Ford Falcon XY GTHO	ProAm	192
23	Marcus Zukanovic	71	Ford Falcon XD	ProMasters	177
24	Ben Dunn	99	Chevrolet Monza 2+2	ProSport	160
25	Rusty French	4	Ford Mustang	ProAm	141
26	Leon Bell	38	Holden Monaro GTS	ProSport	139
27	Dean Lillie	15	Holden Monaro GTS	ProAm	135
28	Gavin Bullas	16	Ford Mustang	ProMasters	122
29	Brett Hotchkin	44	Ford Falcon XY GT	ProSport	101
30	Graham Alexander	57	Chevrolet Camaro SS	ProSport	88
31	Darren Beale	19	Holden Monaro GTS	ProSport	78
32	Rob Burns	22	Holden Monaro GTS	ProSport	75
33	Nathan Geier	4	Ford Escort RS1600	ProSport	70
34	Rod Hotchkin	48	Ford Falcon XY GT	ProSport	66
35	Graeme Crawford	11	Ford Falcon XA GT	ProSport	58
36	Layton Barker	15	Holden Monaro GTS	ProSport	57
37	Blu Cannon	65	Ford Falcon XY GT	ProSport	51
38	Greg Keene	37	Porsche 911	ProSport	37
39	Nigel Benson	20	Holden Monaro GTS	ProSport	20

=== Class winners ===
- The ProMaster class was won by Steve Johnson
- The ProAm class was won by Cameron Tilley
- The ProSports class was won by Jim Pollicina
