= 2004 V8 Supercar Challenge =

Motor race

(Queensland) 2004 V8 Supercar Challenge
Event Information
- Round 11 of 13 in the 2004 V8 Supercar Championship Series
- Date: 21–24 October 2004
- Location: Surfers Paradise, Queensland
- Venue: Surfers Paradise Street Circuit
- Weather: Sunny

Results
Race 1
Distance	22 laps	100 km
Pole position	Mark Skaife; Holden Racing Team	1:50.8455
Winner	Marcos Ambrose; Stone Brothers Racing	41:36.8228
Race 2
Distance	30 laps	150 km
Winner	Greg Murphy; John Kelly Racing	01:00:46.3642
Round Results
First	Greg Murphy; John Kelly Racing	189 pts
Second	Marcos Ambrose; Stone Brothers Racing	189 pts
Third	Jason Bargwanna; Larkham Motorsport	174 pts

The 2004 V8 Supercar Challenge (known for naming rights reasons as the 2004 Gillette V8 Supercar Challenge) was the eleventh round of the 2004 V8 Supercar Championship Series. It was held on the weekend of 21 to 24 October at the Surfers Paradise Street Circuit in Gold Coast, Queensland. The event ran in support of the Lexmark Indy 300 Champ Car World Series race.

Marcos Ambrose continued to solidify his championship charge by winning the first race of the weekend. Mark Skaife had taken pole position and had led the race for a sizeable portion of the event. However, brake fade led to a spin at the back end of the circuit that saw him tumble down the order. Stablemate Greg Murphy would finish second that day and would win the second race en route to claiming overall round honours from Ambrose.

Ambrose was in the midst of controversy when he was accused of brake-testing Rick Kelly at the end of race one. Ambrose claimed that Kelly, who was a lap behind, had attempted to force Ambrose into the wall during the race yet denied any claim of a post-race brake test. These claims were refuted by Kelly and Murphy, and the officials issued Ambrose a $10,000 AUD fine. Kelly himself was embroiled in controversy in light of an incident involving him and Jason Bright that saw the latter launched heavily into the barrier and carried major championship implications. Kelly was docked 50 championship points and deeply apologised for the incident.

== Background ==
The event was held on the weekend of 21 to 24 October 2004. It was the third V8 Supercar championship event to be held on the streets of Surfers Paradise and consisted of two 100 km races with compulsory pitstops each.

=== Entry list ===
There were 35 drivers entered into the event. It featured mixture of vehicle models - fifteen BA Falcon's, sixteen VY Commodore's, and three VX Commodore's.

With David Besnard partaking in the Champ Car event, his WPS Racing entry would be occupied by New Zealand touring car champion, John McIntyre. Alex Yoong would continue to drive the other entry.

Tony Longhurst returned to Rod Nash Racing after having competed in the endurance events with Perkins Engineering.

== Race report ==
=== Qualifying ===
Mark Skaife claimed provisional pole position by two tenths of a second over Marcos Ambrose. Both Paul Radisich and Craig Baird failed to set a time owing to technical issues. They were nonetheless eligible to take part in the racing albeit from the rear of the grid.

Pos	No	Driver	Team	Vehicle	Time
1	2	(Australia) Mark Skaife	Holden Racing Team	Holden Commodore (VY)	1:50.3768
2	9	(Australia) Russell Ingall	Stone Brothers Racing	Ford Falcon (BA)	1:50.5786
3	6	(Australia) Craig Lowndes	Ford Performance Racing	Ford Falcon (BA)	1:50.5878
4	1	(Australia) Marcos Ambrose	Stone Brothers Racing	Ford Falcon (BA)	1:50.6233
5	15	(Australia) Rick Kelly	John Kelly Racing	Holden Commodore (VY)	1:50.7828
6	22	(Australia) Todd Kelly	Holden Racing Team	Holden Commodore (VY)	1:51.0062
7	11	(New Zealand) Steven Richards	Perkins Engineering	Holden Commodore (VY)	1:51.0302
8	10	(Australia) Jason Bargwanna	Larkham Motorsport	Ford Falcon (BA)	1:51.2554
9	31	(Australia) Steven Ellery	Steven Ellery Racing	Ford Falcon (BA)	1:51.2962
10	51	(New Zealand) Greg Murphy	John Kelly Racing	Holden Commodore (VY)	1:51.2966
11	50	(Australia) Jason Bright	Paul Weel Racing	Holden Commodore (VY)	1:51.3406
12	44	(New Zealand) Simon Wills	Team Dynamik	Holden Commodore (VY)	1:51.3409
13	12	(Australia) John Bowe	Brad Jones Racing	Ford Falcon (BA)	1:51.4574
14	888	(Brazil) Max Wilson	Triple Eight Race Engineering	Ford Falcon (BA)	1:51.5087
15	5	(Australia) Glenn Seton	Ford Performance Racing	Ford Falcon (BA)	1:51.5229
16	17	(Australia) Steven Johnson	Dick Johnson Racing	Ford Falcon (BA)	1:51.5676
17	34	(Australia) Garth Tander	Garry Rogers Motorsport	Holden Commodore (VY)	1:51.6971
18	18	(Australia) Warren Luff	Dick Johnson Racing	Ford Falcon (BA)	1:51.8894
19	16	(Australia) Paul Weel	Paul Weel Racing	Holden Commodore (VY)	1:51.9067
20	8	(Australia) Paul Dumbrell	Perkins Engineering	Holden Commodore (VY)	1:52.0735
21	33	(Australia) Cameron McConville	Garry Rogers Motorsport	Holden Commodore (VY)	1:52.1209
22	20	(Australia) Mark Winterbottom	Larkham Motorsport	Ford Falcon (BA)	1:52.2443
23	3	(New Zealand) Jason Richards	Tasman Motorsport	Holden Commodore (VY)	1:52.5695
24	75	(Australia) Anthony Tratt	Paul Little Racing	Holden Commodore (VY)	1:52.8991
25	21	(Australia) Brad Jones	Brad Jones Racing	Ford Falcon (BA)	1:52.9284
26	45	(Australia) Dale Brede	Team Dynamik	Holden Commodore (VY)	1:52.9905
27	29	(Australia) Paul Morris	Paul Morris Motorsport	Holden Commodore (VY)	1:53.0985
28	23	(New Zealand) John McIntyre	WPS Racing	Ford Falcon (BA)	1:53.3698
29	48	(Malaysia) Alex Yoong	WPS Racing	Ford Falcon (BA)	1:53.4289
30	7	(Australia) Tony Longhurst	Rod Nash Racing	Holden Commodore (VX)	1:53.6257
105% time - 1:55.8956
-	88	(New Zealand) Paul Radisich	Triple Eight Race Engineering	Ford Falcon (BA)	no time
-	021	(New Zealand) Craig Baird	Team Kiwi Racing	Holden Commodore (VY)	no time

=== Top ten shootout ===
Pos	No	Driver	Team	Vehicle	Time
1	2	(Australia) Mark Skaife	Holden Racing Team	Holden Commodore (VY)	1:50.8455
2	1	(Australia) Marcos Ambrose	Stone Brothers Racing	Ford Falcon (BA)	1:50.8620
3	15	(Australia) Rick Kelly	John Kelly Racing	Holden Commodore (VY)	1:51.2248
4	9	(Australia) Russell Ingall	Stone Brothers Racing	Ford Falcon (BA)	1:51.2666
5	11	(New Zealand) Steven Richards	Perkins Engineering	Holden Commodore (VY)	1:51.3283
6	51	(New Zealand) Greg Murphy	John Kelly Racing	Holden Commodore (VY)	1:51.3918
7	6	(Australia) Craig Lowndes	Ford Performance Racing	Ford Falcon (BA)	1:51.4860
8	22	(Australia) Todd Kelly	Holden Racing Team	Holden Commodore (VY)	1:51.4877
9	31	(Australia) Steven Ellery	Steven Ellery Racing	Ford Falcon (BA)	1:51.6114
10	10	(Australia) Jason Bargwanna	Larkham Motorsport	Ford Falcon (BA)	1:52.1210

=== Race 1 ===
Pos	No	Driver	Team	Car	Laps	Time/Retired	Grid
1	1	(Australia) Marcos Ambrose	Stone Brothers Racing	Ford Falcon (BA)	22	41:36.8228	2
2	51	(New Zealand) Greg Murphy	John Kelly Racing	Holden Commodore (VY)	22	+ 1.836	6
3	22	(Australia) Todd Kelly	Holden Racing Team	Holden Commodore (VY)	22	+ 4.320	8
4	6	(Australia) Craig Lowndes	Ford Performance Racing	Ford Falcon (BA)	22	+ 7.486	7
5	10	(Australia) Jason Bargwanna	Larkham Motorsport	Ford Falcon (BA)	22	+ 14.751	10
6	44	(New Zealand) Simon Wills	Team Dynamik	Holden Commodore (VY)	22	+ 25.305	12
7	50	(Australia) Jason Bright	Paul Weel Racing	Holden Commodore (VY)	22	+ 30.437	11
8	888	(Brazil) Max Wilson	Triple Eight Race Engineering	Ford Falcon (BA)	22	+ 30.978	14
9	3	(New Zealand) Jason Richards	Tasman Motorsport	Holden Commodore (VY)	22	+ 31.302	23
10	33	(Australia) Cameron McConville	Garry Rogers Motorsport	Holden Commodore (VY)	22	+ 31.846	21
11	17	(Australia) Steven Johnson	Dick Johnson Racing	Ford Falcon (BA)	22	+ 35.951	16
12	88	(New Zealand) Paul Radisich	Triple Eight Race Engineering	Ford Falcon (BA)	22	+ 37.266	31
13	21	(Australia) Brad Jones	Brad Jones Racing	Ford Falcon (BA)	22	+ 41.377	25
14	12	(Australia) John Bowe	Brad Jones Racing	Ford Falcon (BA)	22	+ 42.972	13
15	5	(Australia) Glenn Seton	Ford Performance Racing	Ford Falcon (BA)	22	+ 43.543	15
16	20	(Australia) Mark Winterbottom	Larkham Motorsport	Ford Falcon (BA)	22	+ 52.453	22
17	75	(Australia) Anthony Tratt	Paul Little Racing	Holden Commodore (VY)	22	+ 54.846	24
18	31	(Australia) Steven Ellery	Steven Ellery Racing	Ford Falcon (BA)	22	+ 1:18.040	9
19	23	(New Zealand) John McIntyre	WPS Racing	Ford Falcon (BA)	22	+ 1:24.296	28
20	29	(Australia) Paul Morris	Paul Morris Motorsport	Holden Commodore (VY)	22	+ 1:54.951	27
21	15	(Australia) Rick Kelly	John Kelly Racing	Holden Commodore (VY)	21	+ 1 lap	6
22	34	(Australia) Garth Tander	Garry Rogers Motorsport	Holden Commodore (VY)	21	+ 1 lap	17
23	7	(Australia) Tony Longhurst	Rod Nash Racing	Holden Commodore (VX)	21	+ 1 lap	30
24	2	(Australia) Mark Skaife	Holden Racing Team	Holden Commodore (VY)	21	+ 1 lap	1
25	9	(Australia) Russell Ingall	Stone Brothers Racing	Ford Falcon (BA)	21	+ 1 lap	4
26	16	(Australia) Paul Weel	Paul Weel Racing	Holden Commodore (VY)	21	+ 1 lap	19
Ret	18	(Australia) Warren Luff	Dick Johnson Racing	Ford Falcon (BA)	19	Retired	18
Ret	11	(New Zealand) Steven Richards	Perkins Engineering	Holden Commodore (VY)	15	Retired	5
Ret	8	(Australia) Paul Dumbrell	Perkins Engineering	Holden Commodore (VY)	15	Retired	20
Ret	021	(New Zealand) Craig Baird	Team Kiwi Racing	Holden Commodore (VY)	5	Retired	32
Ret	45	(Australia) Dale Brede	Team Dynamik	Holden Commodore (VY)	0	Retired	26
Ret	48	(Malaysia) Alex Yoong	WPS Racing	Ford Falcon (BA)	0	Retired	29
Fastest Lap: Craig Lowndes (Ford Performance Racing) - 1:52.1764 on lap 10

=== Race 2 ===
Pos	No	Driver	Team	Car	Laps	Time/Retired	Grid
1	51	(New Zealand) Greg Murphy	John Kelly Racing	Holden Commodore (VY)	30	01:00:46.3642	2
2	1	(Australia) Marcos Ambrose	Stone Brothers Racing	Ford Falcon (BA)	30	+ 1.143	1
3	10	(Australia) Jason Bargwanna	Larkham Motorsport	Ford Falcon (BA)	30	+ 4.182	5
4	44	(New Zealand) Simon Wills	Team Dynamik	Holden Commodore (VY)	30	+ 4.503	6
5	888	(Brazil) Max Wilson	Triple Eight Race Engineering	Ford Falcon (BA)	30	+ 5.928	8
6	33	(Australia) Cameron McConville	Garry Rogers Motorsport	Holden Commodore (VY)	30	+ 6.198	10
7	88	(New Zealand) Paul Radisich	Triple Eight Race Engineering	Ford Falcon (BA)	30	+ 6.753	12
8	3	(New Zealand) Jason Richards	Tasman Motorsport	Holden Commodore (VY)	30	+ 8.268	9
9	17	(Australia) Steven Johnson	Dick Johnson Racing	Ford Falcon (BA)	30	+ 8.651	11
10	9	(Australia) Russell Ingall	Stone Brothers Racing	Ford Falcon (BA)	30	+ 8.972	25
11	34	(Australia) Garth Tander	Garry Rogers Motorsport	Holden Commodore (VY)	30	+ 9.544	22
12	20	(Australia) Mark Winterbottom	Larkham Motorsport	Ford Falcon (BA)	30	+ 10.321	16
13	2	(Australia) Mark Skaife	Holden Racing Team	Holden Commodore (VY)	30	+ 10.539	24
14	29	(Australia) Paul Morris	Paul Morris Motorsport	Holden Commodore (VY)	30	+ 11.284	20
15	16	(Australia) Paul Weel	Paul Weel Racing	Holden Commodore (VY)	30	+ 11.788	26
16	12	(Australia) John Bowe	Brad Jones Racing	Ford Falcon (BA)	30	+ 12.531	14
17	8	(Australia) Paul Dumbrell	Perkins Engineering	Holden Commodore (VY)	30	+ 13.128	29
18	23	(New Zealand) John McIntyre	WPS Racing	Ford Falcon (BA)	30	+ 13.540	19
19	5	(Australia) Glenn Seton	Ford Performance Racing	Ford Falcon (BA)	30	+ 14.556	15
20	75	(Australia) Anthony Tratt	Paul Little Racing	Holden Commodore (VY)	30	+ 16.232	17
21	31	(Australia) Steven Ellery	Steven Ellery Racing	Ford Falcon (BA)	30	+ 16.450	18
22	021	(New Zealand) Craig Baird	Team Kiwi Racing	Holden Commodore (VY)	30	+ 17.092	30
23	48	(Malaysia) Alex Yoong	WPS Racing	Ford Falcon (BA)	30	+ 18.289	32
24	45	(Australia) Dale Brede	Team Dynamik	Holden Commodore (VY)	30	+ 26.126	31
25	15	(Australia) Rick Kelly	John Kelly Racing	Holden Commodore (VY)	30	+ 1:13.264	21
26	18	(Australia) Warren Luff	Dick Johnson Racing	Ford Falcon (BA)	29	+ 1 lap	27
Ret	7	(Australia) Tony Longhurst	Rod Nash Racing	Holden Commodore (VX)	27	Retired	23
Ret	50	(Australia) Jason Bright	Paul Weel Racing	Holden Commodore (VY)	22	Accident	7
Ret	6	(Australia) Craig Lowndes	Ford Performance Racing	Ford Falcon (BA)	17	Retired	4
Ret	11	(New Zealand) Steven Richards	Perkins Engineering	Holden Commodore (VY)	16	Retired	28
Ret	21	(Australia) Brad Jones	Brad Jones Racing	Ford Falcon (BA)	15	Retired	13
DSQ	22	(Australia) Todd Kelly	Holden Racing Team	Holden Commodore (VY)		Disqualified	3
Fastest Lap: Marcos Ambrose (Stone Brothers Racing) - 1:52.2046 on lap 5

== Championship standings ==
Pos.	No	Driver	Team	Pts
1	1	(Australia) Marcos Ambrose	Stone Brothers Racing	1856
2	50	(Australia) Jason Bright	Paul Weel Racing	1690
3	51	(New Zealand) Greg Murphy	John Kelly Racing	1665
4	9	(Australia) Russell Ingall	Stone Brothers Racing	1612
5	15	(Australia) Rick Kelly	John Kelly Racing	1575
