= 2004 V8 Supercars Perth round =

Motor race

(Western Australia) 2004 V8 Supercars Perth round
Event Information
- Round 5 of 13 in the 2004 V8 Supercar Championship Series
- Date: 11–13 June 2004
- Location: Perth, Western Australia
- Venue: Barbagallo Raceway
- Weather: Fine

Results
Race 1
Distance	42 laps	100 km
Pole position	Steven Richards; Perkins Engineering	55.9216
Winner	Mark Skaife; Holden Racing Team	44:01.2266
Race 2
Distance	42 laps	100 km
Winner	Jason Bright; Paul Weel Racing	44:46.1217
Race 3
Distance	42 laps	100 km
Winner	Jason Bright; Paul Weel Racing	40:13.2662
Round Results
First	Jason Bright; Paul Weel Racing	190 pts
Second	Marcos Ambrose; Stone Brothers Racing	178 pts
Third	Rick Kelly; John Kelly Racing	178 pts

The 2004 V8 Supercars Perth round was the fifth round of the 2004 V8 Supercar Championship Series. It was held on the weekend of 11 to 13 June at the Barbagallo Raceway in Perth, Western Australia.

Jason Bright largely dominated the weekend by claiming wins in races two and three en route to taking overall round honours ahead of Marcos Ambrose and Rick Kelly. Steven Richards had claimed pole position for the first race but an incident involving Mark Skaife saw the championship leader spear off into the gravel and out of the race. Skaife would go on to take his first victory of the season.

Marcos Ambrose had recovered from an abhorrent qualifying session to climb from 21st on the grid to finish third in race one. Finishing second overall for the weekend, coupled with Richards' turbulent race one, Ambrose would reclaim the championship lead from Richards heading into the next round at Ipswich.

== Background ==
The event was held on the weekend of 11 to 13 June 2004. It was the 28th ATCC/V8 Supercar event to be held at Barbagallo Raceway and consisted of three 100 km races with compulsory pitstops in each. As entrant numbers did not breach the field capacity, no pre-qualifying was necessary.

Steven Richards entered the round as the championship leader by ten point lead over nearest competitor, Marcos Ambrose. The defending event winner from 2003 was Ambrose.

=== Entry list ===
There were 32 drivers entered into the event. It featured mixture of vehicle models - thirteen BA Falcon's, fifteen VY Commodore's, and two VX Commodore's.

The only change in the entry list from the previous round in Darwin was a number change for WPS Racing's Mark Noske from 48 to 14.

== Race report ==
=== Qualifying ===
Jason Bright claimed provisional pole position and was the only driver to post a time under the 55 second bracket. Some regular front-runners struggled; most notably Marcos Ambrose who could only muster 21st position on the grid.

Pos	No	Driver	Team	Vehicle	Time
1	50	(Australia) Jason Bright	Paul Weel Racing	Holden Commodore (VY)	55.8539
2	2	(Australia) Mark Skaife	Holden Racing Team	Holden Commodore (VY)	56.0931
3	88	(New Zealand) Paul Radisich	Triple Eight Race Engineering	Ford Falcon (BA)	56.1565
4	33	(Australia) Cameron McConville	Garry Rogers Motorsport	Holden Commodore (VY)	56.2595
5	11	(New Zealand) Steven Richards	Perkins Engineering	Holden Commodore (VY)	56.2622
6	15	(Australia) Rick Kelly	John Kelly Racing	Holden Commodore (VY)	56.2854
7	12	(Australia) John Bowe	Brad Jones Racing	Ford Falcon (BA)	56.3696
8	3	(New Zealand) Jason Richards	Tasman Motorsport	Holden Commodore (VX)	56.3702
9	5	(Australia) Glenn Seton	Ford Performance Racing	Ford Falcon (BA)	56.3790
10	6	(Australia) Craig Lowndes	Ford Performance Racing	Ford Falcon (BA)	56.3930
11	22	(Australia) Todd Kelly	Holden Racing Team	Holden Commodore (VY)	56.3991
12	29	(Australia) Paul Morris	Paul Morris Motorsport	Holden Commodore (VY)	56.4516
13	8	(Australia) Paul Dumbrell	Perkins Engineering	Holden Commodore (VY)	56.4610
14	51	(New Zealand) Greg Murphy	John Kelly Racing	Holden Commodore (VY)	56.4751
15	21	(Australia) Brad Jones	Brad Jones Racing	Ford Falcon (BA)	56.5075
16	31	(Australia) Steven Ellery	Steven Ellery Racing	Ford Falcon (BA)	56.5605
17	9	(Australia) Russell Ingall	Stone Brothers Racing	Ford Falcon (BA)	56.5772
18	34	(Australia) Garth Tander	Garry Rogers Motorsport	Holden Commodore (VY)	56.5864
19	10	(Australia) Jason Bargwanna	Larkham Motorsport	Ford Falcon (BA)	56.6665
20	17	(Australia) Steven Johnson	Dick Johnson Racing	Ford Falcon (BA)	56.6897
21	1	(Australia) Marcos Ambrose	Stone Brothers Racing	Ford Falcon (BA)	56.7018
22	7	(Australia) Tony Longhurst	Rod Nash Racing	Holden Commodore (VX)	56.7483
23	44	(New Zealand) Simon Wills	Team Dynamik	Holden Commodore (VY)	56.7506
24	021	(New Zealand) Craig Baird	Team Kiwi Racing	Holden Commodore (VY)	56.7670
25	20	(Australia) Mark Winterbottom	Larkham Motorsport	Ford Falcon (BA)	56.7809
26	23	(Australia) David Besnard	WPS Racing	Ford Falcon (BA)	56.9282
27	888	(Brazil) Max Wilson	Triple Eight Race Engineering	Ford Falcon (BA)	57.0160
28	18	(Australia) Warren Luff	Dick Johnson Racing	Ford Falcon (BA)	57.0215
29	45	(Australia) Dale Brede	Team Dynamik	Holden Commodore (VY)	57.1383
30	16	(Australia) Paul Weel	Paul Weel Racing	Holden Commodore (VY)	57.1392
31	75	(Australia) Anthony Tratt	Paul Little Racing	Holden Commodore (VY)	57.1465
32	14	(Australia) Mark Noske	WPS Racing	Ford Falcon (BA)	57.1790

=== Top ten shootout ===
Pos	No	Driver	Team	Vehicle	Time
1	11	(New Zealand) Steven Richards	Perkins Engineering	Holden Commodore (VY)	55.9216
2	2	(Australia) Mark Skaife	Holden Racing Team	Holden Commodore (VY)	56.0431
3	50	(Australia) Jason Bright	Paul Weel Racing	Holden Commodore (VY)	56.1323
4	15	(Australia) Rick Kelly	John Kelly Racing	Holden Commodore (VY)	56.4674
5	88	(New Zealand) Paul Radisich	Triple Eight Race Engineering	Ford Falcon (BA)	56.4728
6	33	(Australia) Cameron McConville	Garry Rogers Motorsport	Holden Commodore (VY)	56.6436
7	12	(Australia) John Bowe	Brad Jones Racing	Ford Falcon (BA)	56.9285
EXC	3	(New Zealand) Jason Richards	Tasman Motorsport	Holden Commodore (VX)	time excluded
EXC	5	(Australia) Glenn Seton	Ford Performance Racing	Ford Falcon (BA)	time excluded
EXC	6	(Australia) Craig Lowndes	Ford Performance Racing	Ford Falcon (BA)	time excluded

=== Race 1 ===
Pos	No	Driver	Team	Car	Laps	Time/Retired	Grid
1	2	(Australia) Mark Skaife	Holden Racing Team	Holden Commodore (VY)	42	44:01.2266	
2	50	(Australia) Jason Bright	Paul Weel Racing	Holden Commodore (VY)	42	+ 0.493	
3	1	(Australia) Marcos Ambrose	Stone Brothers Racing	Ford Falcon (BA)	42	+ 5.427	
4	15	(Australia) Rick Kelly	John Kelly Racing	Holden Commodore (VY)	42	+ 13.964	
5	34	(Australia) Garth Tander	Garry Rogers Motorsport	Holden Commodore (VY)	42	+ 14.096	
6	33	(Australia) Cameron McConville	Garry Rogers Motorsport	Holden Commodore (VY)	42	+ 17.114	
7	51	(New Zealand) Greg Murphy	John Kelly Racing	Holden Commodore (VY)	42	+ 17.813	
8	12	(Australia) John Bowe	Brad Jones Racing	Ford Falcon (BA)	42	+ 18.173	
9	9	(Australia) Russell Ingall	Stone Brothers Racing	Ford Falcon (BA)	42	+ 18.444	
10	16	(Australia) Paul Weel	Paul Weel Racing	Holden Commodore (VY)	42	+ 19.064	
11	22	(Australia) Todd Kelly	Holden Racing Team	Holden Commodore (VY)	42	+ 19.703	
12	21	(Australia) Brad Jones	Brad Jones Racing	Ford Falcon (BA)	42	+ 21.397	
13	17	(Australia) Steven Johnson	Dick Johnson Racing	Ford Falcon (BA)	42	+ 22.228	
14	7	(Australia) Tony Longhurst	Rod Nash Racing	Holden Commodore (VX)	42	+ 23.907	
15	18	(Australia) Warren Luff	Dick Johnson Racing	Ford Falcon (BA)	42	+ 25.539	
16	888	(Brazil) Max Wilson	Triple Eight Race Engineering	Ford Falcon (BA)	42	+ 25.713	
17	31	(Australia) Steven Ellery	Steven Ellery Racing	Ford Falcon (BA)	42	+ 31.932	
18	10	(Australia) Jason Bargwanna	Larkham Motorsport	Ford Falcon (BA)	42	+ 33.328	
19	20	(Australia) Mark Winterbottom	Larkham Motorsport	Ford Falcon (BA)	42	+ 33.757	
20	3	(New Zealand) Jason Richards	Tasman Motorsport	Holden Commodore (VX)	42	+ 38.677	
21	6	(Australia) Craig Lowndes	Ford Performance Racing	Ford Falcon (BA)	42	+ 40.610	
22	14	(Australia) Mark Noske	WPS Racing	Ford Falcon (BA)	42	+ 41.250	
23	021	(New Zealand) Craig Baird	Team Kiwi Racing	Holden Commodore (VY)	42	+ 48.858	
24	8	(Australia) Paul Dumbrell	Perkins Engineering	Holden Commodore (VY)	41	+ 1 lap	
25	75	(Australia) Anthony Tratt	Paul Little Racing	Holden Commodore (VY)	41	+ 1 lap	
26	45	(Australia) Dale Brede	Team Dynamik	Holden Commodore (VY)	41	+ 1 lap	
Ret	23	(Australia) David Besnard	WPS Racing	Ford Falcon (BA)	40	Retired	
Ret	29	(Australia) Paul Morris	Paul Morris Motorsport	Holden Commodore (VY)	22	Retired	
Ret	44	(New Zealand) Simon Wills	Team Dynamik	Holden Commodore (VY)	21	Retired	
Ret	88	(New Zealand) Paul Radisich	Triple Eight Race Engineering	Ford Falcon (BA)	10	Retired	
Ret	11	(New Zealand) Steven Richards	Perkins Engineering	Holden Commodore (VY)	2	Spun off	
Ret	5	(Australia) Glenn Seton	Ford Performance Racing	Ford Falcon (BA)	0	Retired	
Fastest Lap: Jason Bright (Paul Weel Racing) - 56.4634 on lap 33

=== Race 2 ===
Pos	No	Driver	Team	Car	Laps	Time/Retired	Grid
1	50	(Australia) Jason Bright	Paul Weel Racing	Holden Commodore (VY)	42	44:46.1217	2
2	15	(Australia) Rick Kelly	John Kelly Racing	Holden Commodore (VY)	42	+ 0.929	4
3	51	(New Zealand) Greg Murphy	John Kelly Racing	Holden Commodore (VY)	42	+ 1.194	7
4	1	(Australia) Marcos Ambrose	Stone Brothers Racing	Ford Falcon (BA)	42	+ 1.550	3
5	34	(Australia) Garth Tander	Garry Rogers Motorsport	Holden Commodore (VY)	42	+ 7.234	5
6	11	(New Zealand) Steven Richards	Perkins Engineering	Holden Commodore (VY)	42	+ 7.412	31
7	12	(Australia) John Bowe	Brad Jones Racing	Ford Falcon (BA)	42	+ 7.603	8
8	22	(Australia) Todd Kelly	Holden Racing Team	Holden Commodore (VY)	42	+ 8.906	11
9	31	(Australia) Steven Ellery	Steven Ellery Racing	Ford Falcon (BA)	42	+ 10.994	17
10	17	(Australia) Steven Johnson	Dick Johnson Racing	Ford Falcon (BA)	42	+ 12.785	13
11	29	(Australia) Paul Morris	Paul Morris Motorsport	Holden Commodore (VY)	42	+ 17.915	28
12	3	(New Zealand) Jason Richards	Tasman Motorsport	Holden Commodore (VX)	42	+ 19.473	20
13	21	(Australia) Brad Jones	Brad Jones Racing	Ford Falcon (BA)	42	+ 20.447	12
14	16	(Australia) Paul Weel	Paul Weel Racing	Holden Commodore (VY)	42	+ 22.744	10
15	2	(Australia) Mark Skaife	Holden Racing Team	Holden Commodore (VY)	42	+ 23.265	1
16	20	(Australia) Mark Winterbottom	Larkham Motorsport	Ford Falcon (BA)	42	+ 25.698	19
17	9	(Australia) Russell Ingall	Stone Brothers Racing	Ford Falcon (BA)	42	+ 28.433	9
18	14	(Australia) Mark Noske	WPS Racing	Ford Falcon (BA)	42	+ 30.768	22
19	7	(Australia) Tony Longhurst	Rod Nash Racing	Holden Commodore (VX)	42	+ 36.482	14
20	8	(Australia) Paul Dumbrell	Perkins Engineering	Holden Commodore (VY)	42	+ 41.342	24
21	5	(Australia) Glenn Seton	Ford Performance Racing	Ford Falcon (BA)	42	+ 43.049	32
22	75	(Australia) Anthony Tratt	Paul Little Racing	Holden Commodore (VY)	42	+ 48.001	25
23	888	(Brazil) Max Wilson	Triple Eight Race Engineering	Ford Falcon (BA)	42	+ 54.552	16
24	45	(Australia) Dale Brede	Team Dynamik	Holden Commodore (VY)	41	+ 1 lap	26
Ret	88	(New Zealand) Paul Radisich	Triple Eight Race Engineering	Ford Falcon (BA)	32	Retired	30
Ret	23	(Australia) David Besnard	WPS Racing	Ford Falcon (BA)	21	Retired	27
Ret	10	(Australia) Jason Bargwanna	Larkham Motorsport	Ford Falcon (BA)	20	Retired	18
Ret	021	(New Zealand) Craig Baird	Team Kiwi Racing	Holden Commodore (VY)	20	Retired	23
Ret	6	(Australia) Craig Lowndes	Ford Performance Racing	Ford Falcon (BA)	17	Retired	21
Ret	18	(Australia) Warren Luff	Dick Johnson Racing	Ford Falcon (BA)	14	Retired	15
Ret	44	(New Zealand) Simon Wills	Team Dynamik	Holden Commodore (VY)	10	Retired	29
Ret	33	(Australia) Cameron McConville	Garry Rogers Motorsport	Holden Commodore (VY)	7	Retired	6
Fastest Lap: Jason Bright (Paul Weel Racing) - 56.2878 on lap 38

=== Race 3 ===
Pos	No	Driver	Team	Car	Laps	Time/Retired	Grid
1	50	(Australia) Jason Bright	Paul Weel Racing	Holden Commodore (VY)	42	40:13.2662	1
2	11	(New Zealand) Steven Richards	Perkins Engineering	Holden Commodore (VY)	42	+ 8.957	6
3	1	(Australia) Marcos Ambrose	Stone Brothers Racing	Ford Falcon (BA)	42	+ 9.650	4
4	15	(Australia) Rick Kelly	John Kelly Racing	Holden Commodore (VY)	42	+ 19.361	2
5	16	(Australia) Paul Weel	Paul Weel Racing	Holden Commodore (VY)	42	+ 19.786	14
6	34	(Australia) Garth Tander	Garry Rogers Motorsport	Holden Commodore (VY)	42	+ 21.145	5
7	12	(Australia) John Bowe	Brad Jones Racing	Ford Falcon (BA)	42	+ 21.307	7
8	31	(Australia) Steven Ellery	Steven Ellery Racing	Ford Falcon (BA)	42	+ 21.812	9
9	2	(Australia) Mark Skaife	Holden Racing Team	Holden Commodore (VY)	42	+ 21.984	15
10	22	(Australia) Todd Kelly	Holden Racing Team	Holden Commodore (VY)	42	+ 23.195	8
11	17	(Australia) Steven Johnson	Dick Johnson Racing	Ford Falcon (BA)	42	+ 25.257	10
12	21	(Australia) Brad Jones	Brad Jones Racing	Ford Falcon (BA)	42	+ 25.646	13
13	9	(Australia) Russell Ingall	Stone Brothers Racing	Ford Falcon (BA)	42	+ 26.110	17
14	3	(New Zealand) Jason Richards	Tasman Motorsport	Holden Commodore (VX)	42	+ 31.755	12
15	20	(Australia) Mark Winterbottom	Larkham Motorsport	Ford Falcon (BA)	42	+ 32.400	16
16	51	(New Zealand) Greg Murphy	John Kelly Racing	Holden Commodore (VY)	42	+ 39.809	3
17	888	(Brazil) Max Wilson	Triple Eight Race Engineering	Ford Falcon (BA)	42	+ 42.753	23
18	33	(Australia) Cameron McConville	Garry Rogers Motorsport	Holden Commodore (VY)	42	+ 43.819	32
19	10	(Australia) Jason Bargwanna	Larkham Motorsport	Ford Falcon (BA)	42	+ 44.003	27
20	7	(Australia) Tony Longhurst	Rod Nash Racing	Holden Commodore (VX)	42	+ 44.402	19
21	44	(New Zealand) Simon Wills	Team Dynamik	Holden Commodore (VY)	42	+ 44.666	31
22	23	(Australia) David Besnard	WPS Racing	Ford Falcon (BA)	42	+ 47.547	26
23	18	(Australia) Warren Luff	Dick Johnson Racing	Ford Falcon (BA)	42	+ 47.927	30
24	75	(Australia) Anthony Tratt	Paul Little Racing	Holden Commodore (VY)	42	+ 57.631	22
25	14	(Australia) Mark Noske	WPS Racing	Ford Falcon (BA)	42	+ 58.030	18
26	29	(Australia) Paul Morris	Paul Morris Motorsport	Holden Commodore (VY)	41	+ 1 lap	11
27	8	(Australia) Paul Dumbrell	Perkins Engineering	Holden Commodore (VY)	41	+ 1 lap	20
28	45	(Australia) Dale Brede	Team Dynamik	Holden Commodore (VY)	41	+ 1 lap	24
29	88	(New Zealand) Paul Radisich	Triple Eight Race Engineering	Ford Falcon (BA)	41	+ 1 lap	25
Ret	5	(Australia) Glenn Seton	Ford Performance Racing	Ford Falcon (BA)	25	Retired	21
DNS	021	(New Zealand) Craig Baird	Team Kiwi Racing	Holden Commodore (VY)		Did not start	28
DNS	6	(Australia) Craig Lowndes	Ford Performance Racing	Ford Falcon (BA)		Did not start	29
Fastest Lap: Jason Bright (Paul Weel Racing) - 55.9440 on lap 35

== Championship standings ==
Pos.	No	Driver	Team	Pts
1	1	(Australia) Marcos Ambrose	Stone Brothers Racing	872
2	15	(Australia) Rick Kelly	John Kelly Racing	822
3	11	(New Zealand) Steven Richards	Perkins Engineering	820
4	51	(New Zealand) Greg Murphy	John Kelly Racing	811
5	50	(Australia) Jason Bright	Paul Weel Racing	783
