= 2004 V8 Supercars Launceston round =

Motor race

(Tasmania) 2004 V8 Supercars Launceston round
Event Information
- Round 12 of 13 in the 2004 V8 Supercar Championship Series
- Date: 12–14 November 2004
- Location: Launceston, Tasmania
- Venue: Symmons Plains Raceway
- Weather: Mixed

Results
Race 1
Distance	42 laps	100 km
Pole position	Steven Richards; Perkins Engineering	52.9461
Winner	Rick Kelly; John Kelly Racing	38:16.1351
Race 2
Distance	42 laps	100 km
Winner	Marcos Ambrose; Stone Brothers Racing	40:46.9976
Race 3
Distance	41 laps	100 km
Winner	David Besnard; WPS Racing	49:52.1890
Round Results
First	Russell Ingall; Stone Brothers Racing	164 pts
Second	Greg Murphy; John Kelly Racing	160 pts
Third	Steven Richards; Perkins Engineering	152 pts

The 2004 V8 Supercars Launceston round was the twelfth round of the 2004 V8 Supercar Championship Series. It was held on the weekend of 12 to 14 November at the Symmons Plains Raceway in Launceston, Tasmania. This marked the championship return to Tasmania for the first time since 1999.

Hometown hero Marcos Ambrose entered the round with an opportunity to wrap up the championship with a round to spare. He appeared on course to do so by claiming second in the first race behind Rick Kelly and winning the second. However, an engine problem in the third race meant the championship would remain alive heading into the Grande Finale at Eastern Creek. David Besnard claimed victory in the third race amidst mass confusion after a safety car order error. Greg Murphy was initially declared the winner of the race but the stewards reversed the decision and handed the win back to Besnard. This was Besnard's second and last V8 Supercar victory as well as WPS Racing's only victory in the category.

Russell Ingall claimed overall round honours with Greg Murphy in second and pole position winner Steven Richards in third.

== Background ==
The event was held on the weekend of 12 to 14 November 2004. It was the 32nd ATCC/V8 Supercar event to be held at Symmons Plains Raceway and consisted of three 100 km races with compulsory pitstops each.

During practice, both WPS Racing cars sported windscreen signage displaying the words 'No Money from Ford'. This was done at the behest of team owner Craig Gore in protest of what he perceived to be a lack of support from Ford. Both cars were quickly black-flagged and ordered to promptly remove the signage in accordance to rule B6.5.4 Conduct Prejudicial, which effectively governs the matter of bringing the sport into disrepute. Gore criticised the officials and questioned the motive of the censorship.

Marcos Ambrose entered the round as the championship leader and mathematically in with a chance to clinch the championship with a round to spare.

=== Entry list ===
There were 32 drivers entered into the event. It featured mixture of vehicle models - fifteen BA Falcon's, sixteen VY Commodore's, and one VX Commodore.

David Besnard returned to WPS Racing, taking back his drive from John McIntyre. Alex Yoong would be replaced by Owen Kelly for the remainder of the year.

Steven Ellery Racing had lost Supercheap Auto sponsorship preceding this round and thus entered with a blank livery for the final two rounds.

Alex Davison replaced Tony Longhurst at Rod Nash Racing for the remainder of the season.

== Race report ==
=== Qualifying ===
Pos	No	Driver	Team	Vehicle	Time
1	22	(Australia) Todd Kelly	Holden Racing Team	Holden Commodore (VY)	52.2224
2	2	(Australia) Mark Skaife	Holden Racing Team	Holden Commodore (VY)	52.3551
3	15	(Australia) Rick Kelly	John Kelly Racing	Holden Commodore (VY)	52.3858
4	888	(Brazil) Max Wilson	Triple Eight Race Engineering	Ford Falcon (BA)	52.4496
5	11	(New Zealand) Steven Richards	Perkins Engineering	Holden Commodore (VY)	52.4699
6	34	(Australia) Garth Tander	Garry Rogers Motorsport	Holden Commodore (VY)	52.4776
7	50	(Australia) Jason Bright	Paul Weel Racing	Holden Commodore (VY)	52.4963
8	1	(Australia) Marcos Ambrose	Stone Brothers Racing	Ford Falcon (BA)	52.5029
9	6	(Australia) Craig Lowndes	Ford Performance Racing	Ford Falcon (BA)	52.5036
10	51	(New Zealand) Greg Murphy	John Kelly Racing	Holden Commodore (VY)	52.5635
11	9	(Australia) Russell Ingall	Stone Brothers Racing	Ford Falcon (BA)	52.6413
12	5	(Australia) Glenn Seton	Ford Performance Racing	Ford Falcon (BA)	52.6630
13	18	(Australia) Warren Luff	Dick Johnson Racing	Ford Falcon (BA)	52.6769
14	44	(New Zealand) Simon Wills	Team Dynamik	Holden Commodore (VY)	52.6813
15	8	(Australia) Paul Dumbrell	Perkins Engineering	Holden Commodore (VY)	52.7379
16	21	(Australia) Brad Jones	Brad Jones Racing	Ford Falcon (BA)	52.7388
17	20	(Australia) Mark Winterbottom	Larkham Motorsport	Ford Falcon (BA)	52.7660
18	10	(Australia) Jason Bargwanna	Larkham Motorsport	Ford Falcon (BA)	52.7729
19	17	(Australia) Steven Johnson	Dick Johnson Racing	Ford Falcon (BA)	52.7963
20	29	(Australia) Paul Morris	Paul Morris Motorsport	Holden Commodore (VY)	52.8519
21	88	(New Zealand) Paul Radisich	Triple Eight Race Engineering	Ford Falcon (BA)	52.8790
22	31	(Australia) Steven Ellery	Steven Ellery Racing	Ford Falcon (BA)	52.8955
23	33	(Australia) Cameron McConville	Garry Rogers Motorsport	Holden Commodore (VY)	52.9076
24	3	(New Zealand) Jason Richards	Tasman Motorsport	Holden Commodore (VY)	52.9177
25	23	(Australia) David Besnard	WPS Racing	Ford Falcon (BA)	52.9459
26	16	(Australia) Paul Weel	Paul Weel Racing	Holden Commodore (VY)	52.9460
27	45	(Australia) Dale Brede	Team Dynamik	Holden Commodore (VY)	53.0258
28	021	(New Zealand) Craig Baird	Team Kiwi Racing	Holden Commodore (VY)	53.2328
29	7	(Australia) Alex Davison	Rod Nash Racing	Holden Commodore (VX)	53.3399
30	75	(Australia) Anthony Tratt	Paul Little Racing	Holden Commodore (VY)	53.3813
31	12	(Australia) John Bowe	Brad Jones Racing	Ford Falcon (BA)	53.4590
105% time - 54.8335
-	48	(Australia) Owen Kelly	WPS Racing	Ford Falcon (BA)	no time

=== Top ten shootout ===
Pos	No	Driver	Team	Vehicle	Time
1	11	(New Zealand) Steven Richards	Perkins Engineering	Holden Commodore (VY)	52.9461
2	22	(Australia) Todd Kelly	Holden Racing Team	Holden Commodore (VY)	52.9598
3	2	(Australia) Mark Skaife	Holden Racing Team	Holden Commodore (VY)	52.9898
4	1	(Australia) Marcos Ambrose	Stone Brothers Racing	Ford Falcon (BA)	53.1813
5	15	(Australia) Rick Kelly	John Kelly Racing	Holden Commodore (VY)	53.2054
6	34	(Australia) Garth Tander	Garry Rogers Motorsport	Holden Commodore (VY)	53.2422
7	6	(Australia) Craig Lowndes	Ford Performance Racing	Ford Falcon (BA)	53.4483
8	51	(New Zealand) Greg Murphy	John Kelly Racing	Holden Commodore (VY)	53.6866
9	888	(Brazil) Max Wilson	Triple Eight Race Engineering	Ford Falcon (BA)	54.3146
EXC	50	(Australia) Jason Bright	Paul Weel Racing	Holden Commodore (VY)	time excluded

=== Race 1 ===
Pos	No	Driver	Team	Car	Laps	Time/Retired	Grid
1	15	(Australia) Rick Kelly	John Kelly Racing	Holden Commodore (VY)	42	38:16.1351	5
2	1	(Australia) Marcos Ambrose	Stone Brothers Racing	Ford Falcon (BA)	42	+ 2.358	4
3	22	(Australia) Todd Kelly	Holden Racing Team	Holden Commodore (VY)	42	+ 2.968	2
4	11	(New Zealand) Steven Richards	Perkins Engineering	Holden Commodore (VY)	42	+ 4.157	1
5	34	(Australia) Garth Tander	Garry Rogers Motorsport	Holden Commodore (VY)	42	+ 12.561	6
6	6	(Australia) Craig Lowndes	Ford Performance Racing	Ford Falcon (BA)	42	+ 14.757	7
7	9	(Australia) Russell Ingall	Stone Brothers Racing	Ford Falcon (BA)	42	+ 16.309	11
8	23	(Australia) David Besnard	WPS Racing	Ford Falcon (BA)	42	+ 21.144	25
9	88	(New Zealand) Paul Radisich	Triple Eight Race Engineering	Ford Falcon (BA)	42	+ 21.791	21
10	50	(Australia) Jason Bright	Paul Weel Racing	Holden Commodore (VY)	42	+ 22.380	10
11	51	(New Zealand) Greg Murphy	John Kelly Racing	Holden Commodore (VY)	42	+ 31.170	8
12	21	(Australia) Brad Jones	Brad Jones Racing	Ford Falcon (BA)	42	+ 34.836	16
13	17	(Australia) Steven Johnson	Dick Johnson Racing	Ford Falcon (BA)	42	+ 40.994	19
14	31	(Australia) Steven Ellery	Steven Ellery Racing	Ford Falcon (BA)	42	+ 41.329	22
15	33	(Australia) Cameron McConville	Garry Rogers Motorsport	Holden Commodore (VY)	42	+ 43.478	23
16	18	(Australia) Warren Luff	Dick Johnson Racing	Ford Falcon (BA)	42	+ 45.900	13
17	12	(Australia) John Bowe	Brad Jones Racing	Ford Falcon (BA)	42	+ 47.424	31
18	16	(Australia) Paul Weel	Paul Weel Racing	Holden Commodore (VY)	42	+ 48.760	26
19	20	(Australia) Mark Winterbottom	Larkham Motorsport	Ford Falcon (BA)	42	+ 49.041	17
20	7	(Australia) Alex Davison	Rod Nash Racing	Holden Commodore (VX)	42	+ 49.699	29
21	75	(Australia) Anthony Tratt	Paul Little Racing	Holden Commodore (VY)	42	+ 50.426	30
22	10	(Australia) Jason Bargwanna	Larkham Motorsport	Ford Falcon (BA)	42	+ 52.748	18
23	48	(Australia) Owen Kelly	WPS Racing	Ford Falcon (BA)	41	+ 1 lap	32
24	8	(Australia) Paul Dumbrell	Perkins Engineering	Holden Commodore (VY)	41	+ 1 lap	15
25	3	(New Zealand) Jason Richards	Tasman Motorsport	Holden Commodore (VY)	41	+ 1 lap	24
26	888	(Brazil) Max Wilson	Triple Eight Race Engineering	Ford Falcon (BA)	41	+ 1 lap	9
27	021	(New Zealand) Craig Baird	Team Kiwi Racing	Holden Commodore (VY)	41	+ 1 lap	28
28	5	(Australia) Glenn Seton	Ford Performance Racing	Ford Falcon (BA)	41	+ 1 lap	12
Ret	2	(Australia) Mark Skaife	Holden Racing Team	Holden Commodore (VY)	36	Spun off	3
Ret	45	(Australia) Dale Brede	Team Dynamik	Holden Commodore (VY)	17	Mechanical	27
Ret	44	(New Zealand) Simon Wills	Team Dynamik	Holden Commodore (VY)	11	Engine	14
Ret	29	(Australia) Paul Morris	Paul Morris Motorsport	Holden Commodore (VY)	0	Accident damage	20
Fastest Lap: Garth Tander (Garry Rogers Motorsport) - 52.8140 on lap 9

=== Race 2 ===
Pos	No	Driver	Team	Car	Laps	Time/Retired	Grid
1	1	(Australia) Marcos Ambrose	Stone Brothers Racing	Ford Falcon (BA)	42	40:46.9976	2
2	15	(Australia) Rick Kelly	John Kelly Racing	Holden Commodore (VY)	42	+ 1.763	1
3	22	(Australia) Todd Kelly	Holden Racing Team	Holden Commodore (VY)	42	+ 2.057	3
4	51	(New Zealand) Greg Murphy	John Kelly Racing	Holden Commodore (VY)	42	+ 3.600	11
5	9	(Australia) Russell Ingall	Stone Brothers Racing	Ford Falcon (BA)	42	+ 4.023	7
6	6	(Australia) Craig Lowndes	Ford Performance Racing	Ford Falcon (BA)	42	+ 4.432	6
7	33	(Australia) Cameron McConville	Garry Rogers Motorsport	Holden Commodore (VY)	42	+ 5.133	15
8	31	(Australia) Steven Ellery	Steven Ellery Racing	Ford Falcon (BA)	42	+ 9.658	14
9	21	(Australia) Brad Jones	Brad Jones Racing	Ford Falcon (BA)	42	+ 11.496	12
10	17	(Australia) Steven Johnson	Dick Johnson Racing	Ford Falcon (BA)	42	+ 13.224	13
11	10	(Australia) Jason Bargwanna	Larkham Motorsport	Ford Falcon (BA)	42	+ 16.022	22
12	18	(Australia) Warren Luff	Dick Johnson Racing	Ford Falcon (BA)	42	+ 16.470	16
13	11	(New Zealand) Steven Richards	Perkins Engineering	Holden Commodore (VY)	42	+ 17.710	4
14	12	(Australia) John Bowe	Brad Jones Racing	Ford Falcon (BA)	42	+ 18.284	17
15	888	(Brazil) Max Wilson	Triple Eight Race Engineering	Ford Falcon (BA)	42	+ 18.705	26
16	44	(New Zealand) Simon Wills	Team Dynamik	Holden Commodore (VY)	42	+ 19.146	31
17	20	(Australia) Mark Winterbottom	Larkham Motorsport	Ford Falcon (BA)	42	+ 19.530	19
18	45	(Australia) Dale Brede	Team Dynamik	Holden Commodore (VY)	42	+ 20.175	30
19	5	(Australia) Glenn Seton	Ford Performance Racing	Ford Falcon (BA)	42	+ 20.461	28
20	7	(Australia) Alex Davison	Rod Nash Racing	Holden Commodore (VX)	42	+ 22.532	20
21	88	(New Zealand) Paul Radisich	Triple Eight Race Engineering	Ford Falcon (BA)	42	+ 23.927	9
22	48	(Australia) Owen Kelly	WPS Racing	Ford Falcon (BA)	42	+ 24.518	23
23	8	(Australia) Paul Dumbrell	Perkins Engineering	Holden Commodore (VY)	42	+ 25.587	24
24	50	(Australia) Jason Bright	Paul Weel Racing	Holden Commodore (VY)	42	+ 33.470	10
25	3	(New Zealand) Jason Richards	Tasman Motorsport	Holden Commodore (VY)	41	+ 1 lap	25
26	75	(Australia) Anthony Tratt	Paul Little Racing	Holden Commodore (VY)	41	+ 1 lap	21
27	16	(Australia) Paul Weel	Paul Weel Racing	Holden Commodore (VY)	41	+ 1 lap	18
28	34	(Australia) Garth Tander	Garry Rogers Motorsport	Holden Commodore (VY)	41	+ 1 lap	5
29	23	(Australia) David Besnard	WPS Racing	Ford Falcon (BA)	38	+ 4 laps	8
30	29	(Australia) Paul Morris	Paul Morris Motorsport	Holden Commodore (VY)	36	+ 6 laps	32
Ret	2	(Australia) Mark Skaife	Holden Racing Team	Holden Commodore (VY)	33	Accident damage	29
Ret	021	(New Zealand) Craig Baird	Team Kiwi Racing	Holden Commodore (VY)	21	Mechanical	27
Fastest Lap: Todd Kelly (Holden Racing Team) - 52.7395 on lap 6

=== Race 3 ===
Pos	No	Driver	Team	Car	Laps	Time/Retired	Grid
1	23	(Australia) David Besnard	WPS Racing	Ford Falcon (BA)	41	49:52.1890	29
2	50	(Australia) Jason Bright	Paul Weel Racing	Holden Commodore (VY)	41	+ 0.572	24
3	2	(Australia) Mark Skaife	Holden Racing Team	Holden Commodore (VY)	41	+ 1.102	31
4	51	(New Zealand) Greg Murphy	John Kelly Racing	Holden Commodore (VY)	41	+ 39.959	4
5	9	(Australia) Russell Ingall	Stone Brothers Racing	Ford Falcon (BA)	41	+ 40.335	5
6	11	(New Zealand) Steven Richards	Perkins Engineering	Holden Commodore (VY)	41	+ 40.763	13
7	33	(Australia) Cameron McConville	Garry Rogers Motorsport	Holden Commodore (VY)	41	+ 43.464	7
8	17	(Australia) Steven Johnson	Dick Johnson Racing	Ford Falcon (BA)	41	+ 43.849	10
9	18	(Australia) Warren Luff	Dick Johnson Racing	Ford Falcon (BA)	41	+ 44.202	12
10	31	(Australia) Steven Ellery	Steven Ellery Racing	Ford Falcon (BA)	41	+ 44.599	8
11	20	(Australia) Mark Winterbottom	Larkham Motorsport	Ford Falcon (BA)	41	+ 44.934	17
12	44	(New Zealand) Simon Wills	Team Dynamik	Holden Commodore (VY)	41	+ 46.670	16
13	6	(Australia) Craig Lowndes	Ford Performance Racing	Ford Falcon (BA)	41	+ 47.429	6
14	88	(New Zealand) Paul Radisich	Triple Eight Race Engineering	Ford Falcon (BA)	41	+ 48.364	21
15	888	(Brazil) Max Wilson	Triple Eight Race Engineering	Ford Falcon (BA)	41	+ 48.611	15
16	12	(Australia) John Bowe	Brad Jones Racing	Ford Falcon (BA)	41	+ 49.719	14
17	5	(Australia) Glenn Seton	Ford Performance Racing	Ford Falcon (BA)	41	+ 50.090	19
18	48	(Australia) Owen Kelly	WPS Racing	Ford Falcon (BA)	41	+ 50.808	22
19	29	(Australia) Paul Morris	Paul Morris Motorsport	Holden Commodore (VY)	41	+ 52.486	30
20	3	(New Zealand) Jason Richards	Tasman Motorsport	Holden Commodore (VY)	41	+ 52.858	25
21	10	(Australia) Jason Bargwanna	Larkham Motorsport	Ford Falcon (BA)	40	+ 1 lap	11
22	75	(Australia) Anthony Tratt	Paul Little Racing	Holden Commodore (VY)	40	+ 1 lap	26
23	8	(Australia) Paul Dumbrell	Perkins Engineering	Holden Commodore (VY)	40	+ 1 lap	23
24	21	(Australia) Brad Jones	Brad Jones Racing	Ford Falcon (BA)	40	+ 1 lap	9
25	45	(Australia) Dale Brede	Team Dynamik	Holden Commodore (VY)	39	+ 2 laps	18
Ret	15	(Australia) Rick Kelly	John Kelly Racing	Holden Commodore (VY)	25	Spun off	2
Ret	1	(Australia) Marcos Ambrose	Stone Brothers Racing	Ford Falcon (BA)	23	Engine	1
Ret	7	(Australia) Alex Davison	Rod Nash Racing	Holden Commodore (VX)	22	Accident damage	20
Ret	22	(Australia) Todd Kelly	Holden Racing Team	Holden Commodore (VY)	9	Engine	3
Ret	16	(Australia) Paul Weel	Paul Weel Racing	Holden Commodore (VY)	9	Accident	27
Ret	34	(Australia) Garth Tander	Garry Rogers Motorsport	Holden Commodore (VY)	0	Mechanical	28
DNS	021	(New Zealand) Craig Baird	Team Kiwi Racing	Holden Commodore (VY)		Did not start	
Fastest Lap: Todd Kelly (Holden Racing Team) - 52.8062 on lap 7

== Championship standings ==
Pos.	No	Driver	Team	Pts
1	1	(Australia) Marcos Ambrose	Stone Brothers Racing	1982
2	51	(New Zealand) Greg Murphy	John Kelly Racing	1825
3	50	(Australia) Jason Bright	Paul Weel Racing	1816
4	9	(Australia) Russell Ingall	Stone Brothers Racing	1776
5	15	(Australia) Rick Kelly	John Kelly Racing	1701
