= 2004 V8 Supercars Ipswich round =

Motor race

(Queensland) 2004 V8 Supercars Ipswich round
Event Information
- Round 6 of 13 in the 2004 V8 Supercar Championship Series
- Date: 2–4 July 2004
- Location: Ipswich, Queensland
- Venue: Queensland Raceway
- Weather: Fine

Results
Race 1
| Distance | 90 laps | 300 km |
| Pole position | Marcos Ambrose; Stone Brothers Racing | 1:10.5335 |
| Winner | Marcos Ambrose; Stone Brothers Racing | 02:01:44.8762 |
Round Results
| First | Marcos Ambrose; Stone Brothers Racing | 192 pts |
| Second | Steven Richards; Perkins Engineering | 186 pts |
| Third | Garth Tander; Garry Rogers Motorsport | 180 pts |

The 2004 V8 Supercars Ipswich round was the sixth round of the 2004 V8 Supercar Championship Series. It was held on the weekend of 2 to 4 July at the Queensland Raceway in Ipswich, Queensland.

Marcos Ambrose dominated the weekend by securing pole position and leading the race all the way to the finish to claim victory. Following the race however, Ambrose would be stripped of his points (albeit keeping his race win) after his car was discovered to have had an extra wire in its loom. Dubbed 'Wire-Gate', Stone Brothers Racing were also issued a $10,000 AUD fine. However, the team would successfully appeal and Ambrose's points were reinstated.

== Background ==
The event was held on the weekend of 2 to 4 July 2004. It was the fourth V8 Supercar event to be held at Queensland Raceway in the sprint format and consisted of one 300 km race with two compulsory pitstops for fuel and tyres.

=== Entry list ===
There were 35 drivers entered into the event. It featured mixture of vehicle models - one AU Ford Falcon, fifteen BA Falcon's, sixteen VY Commodore's, and three VX Commodore's.

Two drivers made their first appearances in the championship in this round. Neil McFadyen made his first appearance in 2004 driving a third Team Dynamik entry and Garth Walden entered an AU Falcon in a privateer effort.

David Krause returned to the championship driving a privateer VX Commodore entry.

== Race report ==
=== Qualifying ===
Jason Bright secured provisional pole position by six hundredths of a second. David Krause did not qualify by virtue of missing the 105% time by two seconds.

| Pos | No | Driver | Team | Vehicle | Time |
|---|---|---|---|---|---|
| 1 | 50 | (Australia) Jason Bright | Paul Weel Racing | Holden Commodore (VY) | 1:10.2957 |
| 2 | 1 | (Australia) Marcos Ambrose | Stone Brothers Racing | Ford Falcon (BA) | 1:10.3583 |
| 3 | 9 | (Australia) Russell Ingall | Stone Brothers Racing | Ford Falcon (BA) | 1:10.6130 |
| 4 | 2 | (Australia) Mark Skaife | Holden Racing Team | Holden Commodore (VY) | 1:10.6450 |
| 5 | 11 | (New Zealand) Steven Richards | Perkins Engineering | Holden Commodore (VY) | 1:10.6847 |
| 6 | 88 | (New Zealand) Paul Radisich | Triple Eight Race Engineering | Ford Falcon (BA) | 1:10.6900 |
| 7 | 12 | (Australia) John Bowe | Brad Jones Racing | Ford Falcon (BA) | 1:10.6916 |
| 8 | 44 | (New Zealand) Simon Wills | Team Dynamik | Holden Commodore (VY) | 1:10.6970 |
| 9 | 22 | (Australia) Todd Kelly | Holden Racing Team | Holden Commodore (VY) | 1:10.6994 |
| 10 | 021 | (New Zealand) Craig Baird | Team Kiwi Racing | Holden Commodore (VY) | 1:10.7756 |
| 11 | 16 | (Australia) Paul Weel | Paul Weel Racing | Holden Commodore (VY) | 1:10.8383 |
| 12 | 34 | (Australia) Garth Tander | Garry Rogers Motorsport | Holden Commodore (VY) | 1:10.8547 |
| 13 | 31 | (Australia) Steven Ellery | Steven Ellery Racing | Ford Falcon (BA) | 1:10.8614 |
| 14 | 20 | (Australia) Mark Winterbottom | Larkham Motorsport | Ford Falcon (BA) | 1:10.8738 |
| 15 | 888 | (Brazil) Max Wilson | Triple Eight Race Engineering | Ford Falcon (BA) | 1:10.8952 |
| 16 | 18 | (Australia) Warren Luff | Dick Johnson Racing | Ford Falcon (BA) | 1:10.9035 |
| 17 | 8 | (Australia) Paul Dumbrell | Perkins Engineering | Holden Commodore (VY) | 1:10.9058 |
| 18 | 17 | (Australia) Steven Johnson | Dick Johnson Racing | Ford Falcon (BA) | 1:10.9489 |
| 19 | 10 | (Australia) Jason Bargwanna | Larkham Motorsport | Ford Falcon (BA) | 1:10.9896 |
| 20 | 48 | (Australia) Mark Noske | WPS Racing | Ford Falcon (BA) | 1:10.9982 |
| 21 | 23 | (Australia) David Besnard | WPS Racing | Ford Falcon (BA) | 1:11.0146 |
| 22 | 29 | (Australia) Paul Morris | Paul Morris Motorsport | Holden Commodore (VY) | 1:11.0715 |
| 23 | 51 | (New Zealand) Greg Murphy | John Kelly Racing | Holden Commodore (VY) | 1:11.0732 |
| 24 | 15 | (Australia) Rick Kelly | John Kelly Racing | Holden Commodore (VY) | 1:11.1354 |
| 25 | 21 | (Australia) Brad Jones | Brad Jones Racing | Ford Falcon (BA) | 1:11.1867 |
| 26 | 5 | (Australia) Glenn Seton | Ford Performance Racing | Ford Falcon (BA) | 1:11.2684 |
| 27 | 6 | (Australia) Craig Lowndes | Ford Performance Racing | Ford Falcon (BA) | 1:11.3623 |
| 28 | 33 | (Australia) Cameron McConville | Garry Rogers Motorsport | Holden Commodore (VY) | 1:11.3895 |
| 29 | 3 | (New Zealand) Jason Richards | Paul Weel Racing | Holden Commodore (VX) | 1:11.5053 |
| 30 | 75 | (Australia) Anthony Tratt | Paul Little Racing | Holden Commodore (VY) | 1:11.5177 |
| 31 | 14 | (Australia) Neil McFadyen | Team Dynamik | Holden Commodore (VY) | 1:11.6369 |
| 32 | 45 | (Australia) Dale Brede | Team Dynamik | Holden Commodore (VY) | 1:11.6576 |
| 33 | 7 | (Australia) Tony Longhurst | Rod Nash Racing | Holden Commodore (VX) | 1:12.1773 |
| 34 | 24 | (Australia) Garth Walden | Walden Motorsport | Ford Falcon (AU) | 1:13.2630 |
105% time - 1:13.8105
| DNQ | 43 | (Australia) David Krause | David Krause Racing | Holden Commodore (VX) | 1:15.9429 |

=== Top ten shootout ===
| Pos | No | Driver | Team | Vehicle | Time |
|---|---|---|---|---|---|
| 1 | 1 | (Australia) Marcos Ambrose | Stone Brothers Racing | Ford Falcon (BA) | 1:10.5335 |
| 2 | 2 | (Australia) Mark Skaife | Holden Racing Team | Holden Commodore (VY) | 1:10.5856 |
| 3 | 22 | (Australia) Todd Kelly | Holden Racing Team | Holden Commodore (VY) | 1:10.6907 |
| 4 | 11 | (New Zealand) Steven Richards | Perkins Engineering | Holden Commodore (VY) | 1:10.7264 |
| 5 | 50 | (Australia) Jason Bright | Paul Weel Racing | Holden Commodore (VY) | 1:10.7353 |
| 6 | 9 | (Australia) Russell Ingall | Stone Brothers Racing | Ford Falcon (BA) | 1:10.8140 |
| 7 | 44 | (New Zealand) Simon Wills | Team Dynamik | Holden Commodore (VY) | 1:11.0678 |
| 8 | 12 | (Australia) John Bowe | Brad Jones Racing | Ford Falcon (BA) | 1:11.1677 |
| 9 | 88 | (New Zealand) Paul Radisich | Triple Eight Race Engineering | Ford Falcon (BA) | 1:11.7223 |
| 10 | 021 | (New Zealand) Craig Baird | Team Kiwi Racing | Holden Commodore (VY) | 1:12.5381 |

=== Race ===
| Pos | No | Driver | Team | Car | Laps | Time/Retired | Grid |
|---|---|---|---|---|---|---|---|
| 1 | 1 | (Australia) Marcos Ambrose | Stone Brothers Racing | Ford Falcon (BA) | 90 | 02:01:44.8762 | 1 |
| 2 | 11 | (New Zealand) Steven Richards | Perkins Engineering | Holden Commodore (VY) | 90 | + 1.584 | 4 |
| 3 | 34 | (Australia) Garth Tander | Garry Rogers Motorsport | Holden Commodore (VY) | 90 | + 2.722 | 12 |
| 4 | 9 | (Australia) Russell Ingall | Stone Brothers Racing | Ford Falcon (BA) | 90 | + 3.661 | 6 |
| 5 | 50 | (Australia) Jason Bright | Paul Weel Racing | Holden Commodore (VY) | 90 | + 4.018 | 5 |
| 6 | 88 | (New Zealand) Paul Radisich | Triple Eight Race Engineering | Ford Falcon (BA) | 90 | + 9.172 | 9 |
| 7 | 8 | (Australia) Paul Dumbrell | Perkins Engineering | Holden Commodore (VY) | 90 | + 9.468 | 17 |
| 8 | 7 | (Australia) Tony Longhurst | Rod Nash Racing | Holden Commodore (VX) | 90 | + 15.676 | 33 |
| 9 | 22 | (Australia) Todd Kelly | Holden Racing Team | Holden Commodore (VY) | 90 | + 16.201 | 3 |
| 10 | 33 | (Australia) Cameron McConville | Garry Rogers Motorsport | Holden Commodore (VY) | 90 | + 16.421 | 28 |
| 11 | 75 | (Australia) Anthony Tratt | Paul Little Racing | Holden Commodore (VY) | 90 | + 16.885 | 30 |
| 12 | 21 | (Australia) Brad Jones | Brad Jones Racing | Ford Falcon (BA) | 90 | + 17.512 | 25 |
| 13 | 5 | (Australia) Glenn Seton | Ford Performance Racing | Ford Falcon (BA) | 90 | + 47.371 | 26 |
| 14 | 888 | (Brazil) Max Wilson | Triple Eight Race Engineering | Ford Falcon (BA) | 89 | + 1 lap | 15 |
| 15 | 15 | (Australia) Rick Kelly | John Kelly Racing | Holden Commodore (VY) | 89 | + 1 lap | 24 |
| 16 | 18 | (Australia) Warren Luff | Dick Johnson Racing | Ford Falcon (BA) | 89 | + 1 lap | 16 |
| 17 | 021 | (New Zealand) Craig Baird | Team Kiwi Racing | Holden Commodore (VY) | 89 | + 1 lap | 10 |
| 18 | 14 | (Australia) Neil McFadyen | Team Dynamik | Holden Commodore (VY) | 89 | + 1 lap | 31 |
| 19 | 23 | (Australia) David Besnard | WPS Racing | Ford Falcon (BA) | 89 | + 1 lap | 21 |
| 20 | 48 | (Australia) Mark Noske | WPS Racing | Ford Falcon (BA) | 88 | + 2 laps | 20 |
| 21 | 20 | (Australia) Mark Winterbottom | Larkham Motorsport | Ford Falcon (BA) | 87 | + 3 laps | 14 |
| 22 | 24 | (Australia) Garth Walden | Walden Motorsport | Ford Falcon (AU) | 84 | + 6 laps | 34 |
| 23 | 29 | (Australia) Paul Morris | Paul Morris Motorsport | Holden Commodore (VY) | 74 | + 16 laps | 22 |
| 24 | 17 | (Australia) Steven Johnson | Dick Johnson Racing | Ford Falcon (BA) | 70 | + 20 laps | 18 |
| 25 | 10 | (Australia) Jason Bargwanna | Larkham Motorsport | Ford Falcon (BA) | 68 | + 22 laps | 19 |
| Ret | 44 | (New Zealand) Simon Wills | Team Dynamik | Holden Commodore (VY) | 65 | Retired | 7 |
| Ret | 2 | (Australia) Mark Skaife | Holden Racing Team | Holden Commodore (VY) | 46 | Retired | 2 |
| Ret | 6 | (Australia) Craig Lowndes | Ford Performance Racing | Ford Falcon (BA) | 39 | Retired | 27 |
| Ret | 3 | (New Zealand) Jason Richards | Tasman Motorsport | Holden Commodore (VX) | 38 | Retired | 29 |
| Ret | 51 | (New Zealand) Greg Murphy | John Kelly Racing | Holden Commodore (VY) | 31 | Retired | 23 |
| Ret | 16 | (Australia) Paul Weel | Paul Weel Racing | Holden Commodore (VY) | 1 | Retired | 11 |
| Ret | 12 | (Australia) John Bowe | Brad Jones Racing | Ford Falcon (BA) | 0 | Accident | 8 |
| Ret | 45 | (Australia) Dale Brede | Team Dynamik | Holden Commodore (VY) | 0 | Accident | 32 |
| Ret | 31 | (Australia) Steven Ellery | Steven Ellery Racing | Ford Falcon (BA) | 0 | Accident | 13 |
Fastest Lap: Jason Bright (Paul Weel Racing) - 1:11.6319 on lap 34

== Championship standings ==
| Pos. | No | Driver | Team | Pts |
|---|---|---|---|---|
| 1 | 1 | (Australia) Marcos Ambrose | Stone Brothers Racing | 1064 |
| 2 | 11 | (New Zealand) Steven Richards | Perkins Engineering | 1006 |
| 3 | 50 | (Australia) Jason Bright | Paul Weel Racing | 951 |
| 4 | 15 | (Australia) Rick Kelly | John Kelly Racing | 930 |
| 5 | 51 | (New Zealand) Greg Murphy | John Kelly Racing | 811 |
