= 2004 V8 Supercars Darwin round =

Motor race

(Northern Territory) 2004 V8 Supercars Darwin round
Event Information
- Round 4 of 13 in the 2004 V8 Supercar Championship Series
- Date: 21–23 May 2004
- Location: Darwin, Northern Territory
- Venue: Hidden Valley Raceway
- Weather: Fine

Results
Race 1
| Distance | 17 laps | 50 km |
| Pole position | Mark Skaife; Holden Racing Team | 1:09.1188 |
| Winner | Russell Ingall; Stone Brothers Racing | 20:16.6910 |
Race 2
| Distance | 35 laps | 100 km |
| Winner | Rick Kelly; John Kelly Racing | 42:21.2095 |
Race 3
| Distance | 35 laps | 100 km |
| Winner | Todd Kelly; Holden Racing Team | 44:03.6595 |
Round Results
| First | Todd Kelly; Holden Racing Team | 188 pts |
| Second | Steven Richards; Perkins Engineering | 176 pts |
| Third | Russell Ingall; Stone Brothers Racing | 164 pts |

The 2004 V8 Supercars Darwin round was the fourth round of the 2004 V8 Supercar Championship Series. It was held on the weekend of 21 to 23 May at the Hidden Valley Raceway in Darwin, Northern Territory. It was the seventh V8 Supercar event to be held at Hidden Valley Raceway and consisted of one 50 km opener followed by two 100 km races with compulsory pitstops in each.

Todd Kelly claimed the Holden Racing Team's first round victory of the season with a strong, consistent campaign that included a win in the final race of the weekend. Teammate Mark Skaife took pole position for the first race and was on course to win before contact at the final corner with Marcos Ambrose gifted the win to Russell Ingall. Rick Kelly was the winner of the second race with brother Todd finishing a close second.

Steven Richards reclaimed the championship lead from Ambrose through a consistent weekend that saw him finish second overall.

== Background ==
The event was held on the weekend of 21 to 23 May 2004. It was the seventh V8 Supercar event to be held at Hidden Valley Raceway and consisted of one 50 km opener followed by two 100 km races with compulsory pitstops in each. As entrant numbers did not breach the field capacity, no pre-qualifying was necessary.

Marcos Ambrose entered the round as the championship leader by four point lead over nearest competitor, Steven Richards. The defending event winner from 2003 was Ambrose.

=== Entry list ===
There were 32 drivers entered into the event. It featured mixture of vehicle models - thirteen BA Falcon's, fifteen VY Commodore's, and two VX Commodore's.

Having purchased the hardware from the now-defunct 00 Motorsport, WPS Racing debuted a second car into the championship to be driven by Mark Noske starting from Darwin onwards.

== Race report ==
=== Qualifying ===
Jason Bright claimed provisional pole position over Mark Skaife five hundredths of a second. Mark Noske was excluded from the results owing to a technical infringement.

| Pos | No | Driver | Team | Vehicle | Time |
|---|---|---|---|---|---|
| 1 | 50 | (Australia) Jason Bright | Paul Weel Racing | Holden Commodore (VY) | 1:09.2821 |
| 2 | 2 | (Australia) Mark Skaife | Holden Racing Team | Holden Commodore (VY) | 1:09.3303 |
| 3 | 22 | (Australia) Todd Kelly | Holden Racing Team | Holden Commodore (VY) | 1:09.3771 |
| 4 | 11 | (New Zealand) Steven Richards | Perkins Engineering | Holden Commodore (VY) | 1:09.4194 |
| 5 | 1 | (Australia) Marcos Ambrose | Stone Brothers Racing | Ford Falcon (BA) | 1:09.4279 |
| 6 | 15 | (Australia) Rick Kelly | John Kelly Racing | Holden Commodore (VY) | 1:09.4307 |
| 7 | 9 | (Australia) Russell Ingall | Stone Brothers Racing | Ford Falcon (BA) | 1:09.5978 |
| 8 | 888 | (Brazil) Max Wilson | Triple Eight Race Engineering | Ford Falcon (BA) | 1:09.6209 |
| 9 | 44 | (New Zealand) Simon Wills | Team Dynamik | Holden Commodore (VY) | 1:09.6804 |
| 10 | 10 | (Australia) Jason Bargwanna | Larkham Motorsport | Ford Falcon (BA) | 1:09.7297 |
| 11 | 6 | (Australia) Craig Lowndes | Ford Performance Racing | Ford Falcon (BA) | 1:09.7590 |
| 12 | 12 | (Australia) John Bowe | Brad Jones Racing | Ford Falcon (BA) | 1:09.7626 |
| 13 | 88 | (New Zealand) Paul Radisich | Triple Eight Race Engineering | Ford Falcon (BA) | 1:09.7629 |
| 14 | 20 | (Australia) Mark Winterbottom | Larkham Motorsport | Ford Falcon (BA) | 1:09.8025 |
| 15 | 34 | (Australia) Garth Tander | Garry Rogers Motorsport | Holden Commodore (VY) | 1:09.8677 |
| 16 | 29 | (Australia) Paul Morris | Paul Morris Motorsport | Holden Commodore (VY) | 1:09.8944 |
| 17 | 51 | (New Zealand) Greg Murphy | John Kelly Racing | Holden Commodore (VY) | 1:09.9283 |
| 18 | 21 | (Australia) Brad Jones | Brad Jones Racing | Ford Falcon (BA) | 1:09.9631 |
| 19 | 17 | (Australia) Steven Johnson | Dick Johnson Racing | Ford Falcon (BA) | 1:09.9752 |
| 20 | 5 | (Australia) Glenn Seton | Ford Performance Racing | Ford Falcon (BA) | 1:09.9867 |
| 21 | 16 | (Australia) Paul Weel | Paul Weel Racing | Holden Commodore (VY) | 1:10.0353 |
| 22 | 021 | (New Zealand) Craig Baird | Team Kiwi Racing | Holden Commodore (VY) | 1:10.0578 |
| 23 | 8 | (Australia) Paul Dumbrell | Perkins Engineering | Holden Commodore (VY) | 1:10.1262 |
| 24 | 18 | (Australia) Warren Luff | Dick Johnson Racing | Ford Falcon (BA) | 1:10.1331 |
| 25 | 33 | (Australia) Cameron McConville | Garry Rogers Motorsport | Holden Commodore (VY) | 1:10.1524 |
| 26 | 31 | (Australia) Steven Ellery | Steven Ellery Racing | Ford Falcon (BA) | 1:10.1704 |
| 27 | 3 | (New Zealand) Jason Richards | Tasman Motorsport | Holden Commodore (VX) | 1:10.2020 |
| 28 | 23 | (Australia) David Besnard | WPS Racing | Ford Falcon (BA) | 1:10.2027 |
| 29 | 75 | (Australia) Anthony Tratt | Paul Little Racing | Holden Commodore (VY) | 1:10.4130 |
| 30 | 7 | (Australia) Tony Longhurst | Rod Nash Racing | Holden Commodore (VX) | 1:10.5515 |
| 31 | 45 | (Australia) Dale Brede | Team Dynamik | Holden Commodore (VY) | 1:10.6418 |
| EXC | 48 | (Australia) Mark Noske | WPS Racing | Ford Falcon (BA) | time excluded |

=== Top ten shootout ===
| Pos | No | Driver | Team | Vehicle | Time |
|---|---|---|---|---|---|
| 1 | 2 | (Australia) Mark Skaife | Holden Racing Team | Holden Commodore (VY) | 1:09.1188 |
| 2 | 22 | (Australia) Todd Kelly | Holden Racing Team | Holden Commodore (VY) | 1:09.3113 |
| 3 | 50 | (Australia) Jason Bright | Paul Weel Racing | Holden Commodore (VY) | 1:09.4812 |
| 4 | 1 | (Australia) Marcos Ambrose | Stone Brothers Racing | Ford Falcon (BA) | 1:09.5602 |
| 5 | 9 | (Australia) Russell Ingall | Stone Brothers Racing | Ford Falcon (BA) | 1:09.6116 |
| 6 | 11 | (New Zealand) Steven Richards | Perkins Engineering | Holden Commodore (VY) | 1:09.6541 |
| 7 | 15 | (Australia) Rick Kelly | John Kelly Racing | Holden Commodore (VY) | 1:09.7914 |
| 8 | 888 | (Brazil) Max Wilson | Triple Eight Race Engineering | Ford Falcon (BA) | 1:09.9293 |
| 9 | 44 | (New Zealand) Simon Wills | Team Dynamik | Holden Commodore (VY) | 1:10.0153 |
| 10 | 10 | (Australia) Jason Bargwanna | Larkham Motorsport | Ford Falcon (BA) | 1:10.2656 |

=== Race 1 ===
| Pos | No | Driver | Team | Car | Laps | Time/Retired | Grid |
|---|---|---|---|---|---|---|---|
| 1 | 9 | (Australia) Russell Ingall | Stone Brothers Racing | Ford Falcon (BA) | 17 | 20:16.6910 | 5 |
| 2 | 22 | (Australia) Todd Kelly | Holden Racing Team | Holden Commodore (VY) | 17 | + 0.610 | 2 |
| 3 | 1 | (Australia) Marcos Ambrose | Stone Brothers Racing | Ford Falcon (BA) | 17 | + 0.774 | 4 |
| 4 | 50 | (Australia) Jason Bright | Paul Weel Racing | Holden Commodore (VY) | 17 | + 1.753 | 3 |
| 5 | 11 | (New Zealand) Steven Richards | Perkins Engineering | Holden Commodore (VY) | 17 | + 2.236 | 6 |
| 6 | 15 | (Australia) Rick Kelly | John Kelly Racing | Holden Commodore (VY) | 17 | + 3.899 | 7 |
| 7 | 10 | (Australia) Jason Bargwanna | Larkham Motorsport | Ford Falcon (BA) | 17 | + 4.637 | 10 |
| 8 | 12 | (Australia) John Bowe | Brad Jones Racing | Ford Falcon (BA) | 17 | + 6.635 | 12 |
| 9 | 88 | (New Zealand) Paul Radisich | Triple Eight Race Engineering | Ford Falcon (BA) | 17 | + 6.909 | 13 |
| 10 | 888 | (Brazil) Max Wilson | Triple Eight Race Engineering | Ford Falcon (BA) | 17 | + 7.575 | 8 |
| 11 | 20 | (Australia) Mark Winterbottom | Larkham Motorsport | Ford Falcon (BA) | 17 | + 10.409 | 14 |
| 12 | 6 | (Australia) Craig Lowndes | Ford Performance Racing | Ford Falcon (BA) | 17 | + 10.636 | 11 |
| 13 | 51 | (New Zealand) Greg Murphy | John Kelly Racing | Holden Commodore (VY) | 17 | + 12.851 | 17 |
| 14 | 2 | (Australia) Mark Skaife | Holden Racing Team | Holden Commodore (VY) | 17 | + 12.853 | 1 |
| 15 | 34 | (Australia) Garth Tander | Garry Rogers Motorsport | Holden Commodore (VY) | 17 | + 14.220 | 15 |
| 16 | 021 | (New Zealand) Craig Baird | Team Kiwi Racing | Holden Commodore (VY) | 17 | + 14.775 | 22 |
| 17 | 16 | (Australia) Paul Weel | Paul Weel Racing | Holden Commodore (VY) | 17 | + 15.286 | 21 |
| 18 | 5 | (Australia) Glenn Seton | Ford Performance Racing | Ford Falcon (BA) | 17 | + 17.004 | 20 |
| 19 | 23 | (Australia) David Besnard | WPS Racing | Ford Falcon (BA) | 17 | + 17.628 | 28 |
| 20 | 8 | (Australia) Paul Dumbrell | Perkins Engineering | Holden Commodore (VY) | 17 | + 20.041 | 23 |
| 21 | 31 | (Australia) Steven Ellery | Steven Ellery Racing | Ford Falcon (BA) | 17 | + 20.184 | 26 |
| 22 | 18 | (Australia) Warren Luff | Dick Johnson Racing | Ford Falcon (BA) | 17 | + 25.172 | 24 |
| 23 | 33 | (Australia) Cameron McConville | Garry Rogers Motorsport | Holden Commodore (VY) | 17 | + 25.506 | 25 |
| 24 | 75 | (Australia) Anthony Tratt | Paul Little Racing | Holden Commodore (VY) | 17 | + 26.242 | 29 |
| 25 | 3 | (New Zealand) Jason Richards | Tasman Motorsport | Holden Commodore (VX) | 17 | + 26.933 | 27 |
| 26 | 7 | (Australia) Tony Longhurst | Rod Nash Racing | Holden Commodore (VX) | 17 | + 27.365 | 30 |
| 27 | 48 | (Australia) Mark Noske | WPS Racing | Ford Falcon (BA) | 17 | + 28.743 | 32 |
| 28 | 45 | (Australia) Dale Brede | Team Dynamik | Holden Commodore (VY) | 17 | + 29.204 | 31 |
| 29 | 29 | (Australia) Paul Morris | Paul Morris Motorsport | Holden Commodore (VY) | 17 | + 43.782 | 16 |
| 30 | 44 | (New Zealand) Simon Wills | Team Dynamik | Holden Commodore (VY) | 16 | + 1 lap | 9 |
| Ret | 21 | (Australia) Brad Jones | Brad Jones Racing | Ford Falcon (BA) | 16 | Retired | 18 |
| Ret | 17 | (Australia) Steven Johnson | Dick Johnson Racing | Ford Falcon (BA) | 9 | Retired | 19 |
Fastest Lap: Paul Radisich (Triple Eight Race Engineering) - 1:10.4320 on lap 5

=== Race 2 ===
| Pos | No | Driver | Team | Car | Laps | Time/Retired | Grid |
|---|---|---|---|---|---|---|---|
| 1 | 15 | (Australia) Rick Kelly | John Kelly Racing | Holden Commodore (VY) | 35 | 42:21.2095 | 6 |
| 2 | 22 | (Australia) Todd Kelly | Holden Racing Team | Holden Commodore (VY) | 35 | + 0.511 | 2 |
| 3 | 11 | (New Zealand) Steven Richards | Perkins Engineering | Holden Commodore (VY) | 35 | + 1.113 | 5 |
| 4 | 51 | (New Zealand) Greg Murphy | John Kelly Racing | Holden Commodore (VY) | 35 | + 5.693 | 13 |
| 5 | 6 | (Australia) Craig Lowndes | Ford Performance Racing | Ford Falcon (BA) | 35 | + 6.098 | 12 |
| 6 | 12 | (Australia) John Bowe | Brad Jones Racing | Ford Falcon (BA) | 35 | + 7.235 | 8 |
| 7 | 10 | (Australia) Jason Bargwanna | Larkham Motorsport | Ford Falcon (BA) | 35 | + 10.684 | 7 |
| 8 | 16 | (Australia) Paul Weel | Paul Weel Racing | Holden Commodore (VY) | 35 | + 11.714 | 17 |
| 9 | 2 | (Australia) Mark Skaife | Holden Racing Team | Holden Commodore (VY) | 35 | + 19.541 | 14 |
| 10 | 20 | (Australia) Mark Winterbottom | Larkham Motorsport | Ford Falcon (BA) | 35 | + 20.673 | 11 |
| 11 | 9 | (Australia) Russell Ingall | Stone Brothers Racing | Ford Falcon (BA) | 35 | + 22.099 | 1 |
| 12 | 5 | (Australia) Glenn Seton | Ford Performance Racing | Ford Falcon (BA) | 35 | + 22.927 | 18 |
| 13 | 1 | (Australia) Marcos Ambrose | Stone Brothers Racing | Ford Falcon (BA) | 35 | + 23.402 | 3 |
| 14 | 8 | (Australia) Paul Dumbrell | Perkins Engineering | Holden Commodore (VY) | 35 | + 33.390 | 20 |
| 15 | 21 | (Australia) Brad Jones | Brad Jones Racing | Ford Falcon (BA) | 35 | + 35.803 | 31 |
| 16 | 88 | (New Zealand) Paul Radisich | Triple Eight Race Engineering | Ford Falcon (BA) | 35 | + 36.382 | 9 |
| 17 | 50 | (Australia) Jason Bright | Paul Weel Racing | Holden Commodore (VY) | 35 | + 36.809 | 4 |
| 18 | 33 | (Australia) Cameron McConville | Garry Rogers Motorsport | Holden Commodore (VY) | 35 | + 38.673 | 23 |
| 19 | 17 | (Australia) Steven Johnson | Dick Johnson Racing | Ford Falcon (BA) | 35 | + 44.143 | 32 |
| 20 | 34 | (Australia) Garth Tander | Garry Rogers Motorsport | Holden Commodore (VY) | 35 | + 44.344 | 15 |
| 21 | 48 | (Australia) Mark Noske | WPS Racing | Ford Falcon (BA) | 35 | + 45.807 | 27 |
| 22 | 18 | (Australia) Warren Luff | Dick Johnson Racing | Ford Falcon (BA) | 35 | + 47.649 | 22 |
| 23 | 7 | (Australia) Tony Longhurst | Rod Nash Racing | Holden Commodore (VX) | 35 | + 47.995 | 26 |
| 24 | 29 | (Australia) Paul Morris | Paul Morris Motorsport | Holden Commodore (VY) | 35 | + 48.934 | 29 |
| 25 | 44 | (New Zealand) Simon Wills | Team Dynamik | Holden Commodore (VY) | 35 | + 48.985 | 30 |
| 26 | 31 | (Australia) Steven Ellery | Steven Ellery Racing | Ford Falcon (BA) | 35 | + 58.881 | 21 |
| 27 | 3 | (New Zealand) Jason Richards | Tasman Motorsport | Holden Commodore (VX) | 35 | + 59.222 | 25 |
| 28 | 23 | (Australia) David Besnard | WPS Racing | Ford Falcon (BA) | 35 | + 1:06.115 | 19 |
| 29 | 45 | (Australia) Dale Brede | Team Dynamik | Holden Commodore (VY) | 34 | + 1 lap | 28 |
| 30 | 75 | (Australia) Anthony Tratt | Paul Little Racing | Holden Commodore (VY) | 34 | + 1 lap | 24 |
| 31 | 021 | (New Zealand) Craig Baird | Team Kiwi Racing | Holden Commodore (VY) | 34 | + 1 lap | 16 |
| Ret | 888 | (Brazil) Max Wilson | Triple Eight Race Engineering | Ford Falcon (BA) | 0 | Retired | 10 |
Fastest Lap: Russell Ingall (Stone Brothers Racing) - 1:10.1633 on lap 6

=== Race 3 ===
| Pos | No | Driver | Team | Car | Laps | Time/Retired | Grid |
|---|---|---|---|---|---|---|---|
| 1 | 22 | (Australia) Todd Kelly | Holden Racing Team | Holden Commodore (VY) | 35 | 44:03.6595 | 2 |
| 2 | 1 | (Australia) Marcos Ambrose | Stone Brothers Racing | Ford Falcon (BA) | 35 | + 1.176 | 13 |
| 3 | 11 | (New Zealand) Steven Richards | Perkins Engineering | Holden Commodore (VY) | 35 | + 1.204 | 3 |
| 4 | 51 | (New Zealand) Greg Murphy | John Kelly Racing | Holden Commodore (VY) | 35 | + 7.339 | 4 |
| 5 | 9 | (Australia) Russell Ingall | Stone Brothers Racing | Ford Falcon (BA) | 35 | + 7.557 | 11 |
| 6 | 12 | (Australia) John Bowe | Brad Jones Racing | Ford Falcon (BA) | 35 | + 8.316 | 6 |
| 7 | 2 | (Australia) Mark Skaife | Holden Racing Team | Holden Commodore (VY) | 35 | + 8.879 | 9 |
| 8 | 34 | (Australia) Garth Tander | Garry Rogers Motorsport | Holden Commodore (VY) | 35 | + 9.383 | 20 |
| 9 | 6 | (Australia) Craig Lowndes | Ford Performance Racing | Ford Falcon (BA) | 35 | + 9.609 | 5 |
| 10 | 50 | (Australia) Jason Bright | Paul Weel Racing | Holden Commodore (VY) | 35 | + 9.971 | 17 |
| 11 | 17 | (Australia) Steven Johnson | Dick Johnson Racing | Ford Falcon (BA) | 35 | + 16.833 | 19 |
| 12 | 44 | (New Zealand) Simon Wills | Team Dynamik | Holden Commodore (VY) | 35 | + 17.286 | 25 |
| 13 | 7 | (Australia) Tony Longhurst | Rod Nash Racing | Holden Commodore (VX) | 35 | + 19.694 | 23 |
| 14 | 5 | (Australia) Glenn Seton | Ford Performance Racing | Ford Falcon (BA) | 35 | + 19.905 | 12 |
| 15 | 29 | (Australia) Paul Morris | Paul Morris Motorsport | Holden Commodore (VY) | 35 | + 21.875 | 24 |
| 16 | 21 | (Australia) Brad Jones | Brad Jones Racing | Ford Falcon (BA) | 35 | + 23.302 | 15 |
| 17 | 8 | (Australia) Paul Dumbrell | Perkins Engineering | Holden Commodore (VY) | 35 | + 23.680 | 14 |
| 18 | 31 | (Australia) Steven Ellery | Steven Ellery Racing | Ford Falcon (BA) | 35 | + 23.932 | 26 |
| 19 | 10 | (Australia) Jason Bargwanna | Larkham Motorsport | Ford Falcon (BA) | 35 | + 25.165 | 7 |
| 20 | 021 | (New Zealand) Craig Baird | Team Kiwi Racing | Holden Commodore (VY) | 35 | + 25.989 | 31 |
| 21 | 15 | (Australia) Rick Kelly | John Kelly Racing | Holden Commodore (VY) | 35 | + 41.290 | 1 |
| 22 | 888 | (Brazil) Max Wilson | Triple Eight Race Engineering | Ford Falcon (BA) | 35 | + 1:17.863 | 32 |
| 23 | 20 | (Australia) Mark Winterbottom | Larkham Motorsport | Ford Falcon (BA) | 34 | + 1 lap | 10 |
| 24 | 18 | (Australia) Warren Luff | Dick Johnson Racing | Ford Falcon (BA) | 34 | + 1 lap | 22 |
| 25 | 88 | (New Zealand) Paul Radisich | Triple Eight Race Engineering | Ford Falcon (BA) | 33 | + 2 laps | 16 |
| 26 | 48 | (Australia) Mark Noske | WPS Racing | Ford Falcon (BA) | 33 | + 2 laps | 21 |
| 27 | 33 | (Australia) Cameron McConville | Garry Rogers Motorsport | Holden Commodore (VY) | 33 | + 2 laps | 18 |
| 28 | 45 | (Australia) Dale Brede | Team Dynamik | Holden Commodore (VY) | 31 | + 4 laps | 29 |
| Ret | 75 | (Australia) Anthony Tratt | Paul Little Racing | Holden Commodore (VY) | 26 | Retired | 30 |
| Ret | 3 | (New Zealand) Jason Richards | Tasman Motorsport | Holden Commodore (VX) | 24 | Retired | 27 |
| Ret | 16 | (Australia) Paul Weel | Paul Weel Racing | Holden Commodore (VY) | 21 | Retired | 8 |
| Ret | 23 | (Australia) David Besnard | WPS Racing | Ford Falcon (BA) | 5 | Retired | 28 |
Fastest Lap: Marcos Ambrose (Stone Brothers Racing) - 1:10.0621 on lap 5

== Championship standings ==
| Pos. | No | Driver | Team | Pts |
|---|---|---|---|---|
| 1 | 11 | (New Zealand) Steven Richards | Perkins Engineering | 704 |
| 2 | 1 | (Australia) Marcos Ambrose | Stone Brothers Racing | 694 |
| 3 | 51 | (New Zealand) Greg Murphy | John Kelly Racing | 665 |
| 4 | 15 | (Australia) Rick Kelly | John Kelly Racing | 644 |
| 5 | 50 | (Australia) Jason Bright | Paul Weel Racing | 593 |
