= 2004 V8 Supercars Eastern Creek round =

Motor race

(New South Wales) 2004 Eastern Creek V8 Supercar round
Event Information
- Round 2 of 13 in the 2004 V8 Supercar Championship Series
- Date: 2–4 May 2004
- Location: Eastern Creek, New South Wales
- Venue: Eastern Creek Raceway
- Weather: Rain

Results
Race 1
Distance	67 laps	300 km
Pole position	Marcos Ambrose; Stone Brothers Racing	1:31.9206
Winner	Rick Kelly; John Kelly Racing	02:17:31.2755
Round Results
First	Rick Kelly; John Kelly Racing	192 pts
Second	Craig Lowndes; Ford Performance Racing	186 pts
Third	Garth Tander; Garry Rogers Motorsport	180 pts

The 2004 V8 Supercars Eastern Creek round was the second round of the 2004 V8 Supercar Championship Series. It was held on the weekend of 2 to 4 May at the Eastern Creek International Raceway in Sydney, New South Wales.

In a race plagued by rain, Rick Kelly earned his first solo V8 Supercar victory as front-running drivers fell by the wayside after starting the race from 17th on the grid. Marcos Ambrose claimed pole position and led a sizeable chunk of the race. However, with the pace of Kelly as well as an off-track excursion on lap 51, the Tasmanian fell down the order and off the podium. Craig Lowndes recovered from a lukewarm qualifying session and mid-race pitstop drama to prevail in the wet weather conditions and claim second place with Garth Tander claiming third.

Steven Richards' fourth-placing helped him usurp Ambrose in the drivers standings heading into the next round at Pukekohe.

== Background ==
The event was held on the weekend of 2 to 4 May 2004. It was the 12th ATCC/V8 Supercar event to be held at Eastern Creek International Raceway and consisted of one 300 km race with two compulsory pitstops for fuel and tyres.

=== Entry list ===
There were 35 drivers entered into the event. It featured mixture of vehicle models - fourteen BA Falcon's, fifteen VY Commodore's, and three VX Commodore's.

Mark Porter made his debut solo appearance in the V8 Supercar series with his privateer outfit, running a VX Commodore. Fellow New Zealander David Thexton would make his final appearance in the category with his BA Falcon.

== Race report ==
=== Qualifying ===
Pos	No	Driver	Team	Vehicle	Time
1	12	(Australia) John Bowe	Brad Jones Racing	Ford Falcon (BA)	1:31.8820
2	2	(Australia) Mark Skaife	Holden Racing Team	Holden Commodore (VY)	1:32.1027
3	9	(Australia) Russell Ingall	Stone Brothers Racing	Ford Falcon (BA)	1:32.1913
4	11	(New Zealand) Steven Richards	Perkins Engineering	Holden Commodore (VY)	1:32.2653
5	22	(Australia) Todd Kelly	Holden Racing Team	Holden Commodore (VY)	1:32.2932
6	1	(Australia) Marcos Ambrose	Stone Brothers Racing	Ford Falcon (BA)	1:32.3319
7	50	(Australia) Jason Bright	Paul Weel Racing	Holden Commodore (VY)	1:32.3321
8	29	(Australia) Paul Morris	Paul Morris Motorsport	Holden Commodore (VY)	1:32.3370
9	88	(New Zealand) Paul Radisich	Triple Eight Race Engineering	Ford Falcon (BA)	1:32.3943
10	44	(New Zealand) Simon Wills	Team Dynamik	Holden Commodore (VY)	1:32.4318
11	888	(Brazil) Max Wilson	Triple Eight Race Engineering	Ford Falcon (BA)	1:32.4854
12	51	(New Zealand) Greg Murphy	John Kelly Racing	Holden Commodore (VY)	1:32.6010
13	16	(Australia) Paul Weel	Paul Weel Racing	Holden Commodore (VY)	1:32.6508
14	5	(Australia) Glenn Seton	Ford Performance Racing	Ford Falcon (BA)	1:32.6873
15	6	(Australia) Craig Lowndes	Ford Performance Racing	Ford Falcon (BA)	1:32.7471
16	34	(Australia) Garth Tander	Garry Rogers Motorsport	Holden Commodore (VY)	1:32.8160
17	15	(Australia) Rick Kelly	John Kelly Racing	Holden Commodore (VY)	1:32.9409
18	021	(New Zealand) Craig Baird	Team Kiwi Racing	Holden Commodore (VY)	1:32.9863
19	10	(Australia) Jason Bargwanna	Larkham Motorsport	Ford Falcon (BA)	1:33.0037
20	3	(New Zealand) Jason Richards	Tasman Motorsport	Holden Commodore (VX)	1:33.0712
21	18	(Australia) Warren Luff	Dick Johnson Racing	Ford Falcon (BA)	1:33.3144
22	21	(Australia) Brad Jones	Brad Jones Racing	Ford Falcon (BA)	1:33.3386
23	8	(Australia) Paul Dumbrell	Perkins Engineering	Holden Commodore (VY)	1:33.4542
24	33	(Australia) Cameron McConville	Garry Rogers Motorsport	Holden Commodore (VY)	1:33.4750
25	20	(Australia) Mark Winterbottom	Larkham Motorsport	Ford Falcon (BA)	1:33.6158
26	23	(Australia) David Besnard	WPS Racing	Ford Falcon (BA)	1:33.6387
27	17	(Australia) Steven Johnson	Dick Johnson Racing	Ford Falcon (BA)	1:33.7128
28	31	(Australia) Steven Ellery	Steven Ellery Racing	Ford Falcon (BA)	1:33.7256
29	45	(Australia) Dale Brede	Team Dynamik	Holden Commodore (VY)	1:34.4402
30	75	(Australia) Anthony Tratt	Paul Little Racing	Holden Commodore (VY)	1:34.8164
31	14	(New Zealand) Mark Porter	MSport	Holden Commodore (VX)	1:34.9271
32	7	(Australia) Tony Longhurst	Rod Nash Racing	Holden Commodore (VX)	no time
-	24	(Australia) Phillip Scifleet	Imrie Motorsport	Holden Commodore (VX)	no time
-	43	(Australia) David Krause	David Krause Racing	Holden Commodore (VX)	no time
-	99	(New Zealand) David Thexton	Thexton Motor Racing	Ford Falcon (BA)	no time

=== Top ten shootout ===
Pos	No	Driver	Team	Vehicle	Time
1	1	(Australia) Marcos Ambrose	Stone Brothers Racing	Ford Falcon (BA)	1:31.9206
2	2	(Australia) Mark Skaife	Holden Racing Team	Holden Commodore (VY)	1:32.0308
3	11	(New Zealand) Steven Richards	Perkins Engineering	Holden Commodore (VY)	1:32.1352
4	50	(Australia) Jason Bright	Paul Weel Racing	Holden Commodore (VY)	1:32.4064
5	22	(Australia) Todd Kelly	Holden Racing Team	Holden Commodore (VY)	1:32.4313
6	9	(Australia) Russell Ingall	Stone Brothers Racing	Ford Falcon (BA)	1:32.6623
7	29	(Australia) Paul Morris	Paul Morris Motorsport	Holden Commodore (VY)	1:32.6730
8	44	(New Zealand) Simon Wills	Team Dynamik	Holden Commodore (VY)	1:32.9307
9	88	(New Zealand) Paul Radisich	Triple Eight Race Engineering	Ford Falcon (BA)	1:33.0298
10	12	(Australia) John Bowe	Brad Jones Racing	Ford Falcon (BA)	1:38.9650

=== Race ===
Pos	No	Driver	Team	Car	Laps	Time/Retired	Grid
1	15	(Australia) Rick Kelly	John Kelly Racing	Holden Commodore (VY)	67	02:17:31.2755	17
2	6	(Australia) Craig Lowndes	Ford Performance Racing	Ford Falcon (BA)	67	+ 0.726	15
3	34	(Australia) Garth Tander	Garry Rogers Motorsport	Holden Commodore (VY)	67	+ 1.404	16
4	11	(New Zealand) Steven Richards	Perkins Engineering	Holden Commodore (VY)	67	+ 2.102	3
5	51	(New Zealand) Greg Murphy	John Kelly Racing	Holden Commodore (VY)	67	+ 3.522	12
6	17	(Australia) Steven Johnson	Dick Johnson Racing	Ford Falcon (BA)	67	+ 4.416	27
7	1	(Australia) Marcos Ambrose	Stone Brothers Racing	Ford Falcon (BA)	67	+ 5.637	1
8	10	(Australia) Jason Bargwanna	Larkham Motorsport	Ford Falcon (BA)	67	+ 6.394	19
9	021	(New Zealand) Craig Baird	Team Kiwi Racing	Holden Commodore (VY)	67	+ 7.773	18
10	888	(Brazil) Max Wilson	Triple Eight Race Engineering	Ford Falcon (BA)	67	+ 8.240	11
11	29	(Australia) Paul Morris	Paul Morris Motorsport	Holden Commodore (VY)	67	+ 12.376	7
12	20	(Australia) Mark Winterbottom	Larkham Motorsport	Ford Falcon (BA)	67	+ 13.581	25
13	50	(Australia) Jason Bright	Paul Weel Racing	Holden Commodore (VY)	67	+ 16.283	4
14	9	(Australia) Russell Ingall	Stone Brothers Racing	Ford Falcon (BA)	67	+ 18.877	6
15	5	(Australia) Glenn Seton	Ford Performance Racing	Ford Falcon (BA)	67	+ 24.272	14
16	44	(New Zealand) Simon Wills	Team Dynamik	Holden Commodore (VY)	67	+ 25.743	8
17	23	(Australia) David Besnard	WPS Racing	Ford Falcon (BA)	67	+ 26.771	26
18	12	(Australia) John Bowe	Brad Jones Racing	Ford Falcon (BA)	67	+ 59.496	10
19	22	(Australia) Todd Kelly	Holden Racing Team	Holden Commodore (VY)	67	+ 1:07.608	5
20	88	(New Zealand) Paul Radisich	Triple Eight Race Engineering	Ford Falcon (BA)	66	+ 1 lap	9
21	18	(Australia) Warren Luff	Dick Johnson Racing	Ford Falcon (BA)	66	+ 1 lap	21
22	2	(Australia) Mark Skaife	Holden Racing Team	Holden Commodore (VY)	66	+ 1 lap	2
23	21	(Australia) Brad Jones	Brad Jones Racing	Ford Falcon (BA)	66	+ 1 lap	22
24	7	(Australia) Tony Longhurst	Rod Nash Racing	Holden Commodore (VX)	66	+ 1 lap	32
25	33	(Australia) Cameron McConville	Garry Rogers Motorsport	Holden Commodore (VY)	66	+ 1 lap	24
26	75	(Australia) Anthony Tratt	Paul Little Racing	Holden Commodore (VY)	65	+ 2 laps	30
27	45	(Australia) Dale Brede	Team Dynamik	Holden Commodore (VY)	65	+ 2 laps	29
28	14	(New Zealand) Mark Porter	MSport	Holden Commodore (VX)	64	+ 3 laps	31
29	16	(Australia) Paul Weel	Paul Weel Racing	Holden Commodore (VY)	54	+ 13 laps	13
30	8	(Australia) Paul Dumbrell	Perkins Engineering	Holden Commodore (VY)	51	+ 16 laps	23
Ret	3	(New Zealand) Jason Richards	Tasman Motorsport	Holden Commodore (VX)	55	Accident damage	20
Ret	31	(Australia) Steven Ellery	Steven Ellery Racing	Ford Falcon (BA)	5	Spun off	28
Fastest Lap: Marcos Ambrose (Stone Brothers Racing) - 1:45.9530 on lap 22

== Championship standings ==
Pos.	No	Driver	Team	Pts
1	11	(New Zealand) Steven Richards	Perkins Engineering	360
2	1	(Australia) Marcos Ambrose	Stone Brothers Racing	348
3	15	(Australia) Rick Kelly	John Kelly Racing	336
4	51	(New Zealand) Greg Murphy	John Kelly Racing	327
5	10	(Australia) Jason Bargwanna	Larkham Motorsport	270
