= 2004 V8 Supercars Winton round =

2004 Supercar Championship event

(Victoria (state)) 2004 V8 Supercars Winton round
Event Information
- Round 7 of 13 in the 2004 V8 Supercar Championship Series
- Date: 23–25 July 2004
- Location: Winton, Victoria, Australia
- Venue: Winton Motor Raceway
- Weather: Saturday: Rain; Sunday: Overcast

Results
Race 1
Distance	100 laps	300 km
Pole position	(New Zealand) Craig Baird; Team Kiwi Racing	1:39.7544
Winner	(Australia) Cameron McConville; Garry Rogers Motorsport	2:34:18.5237
Round Results
First	(Australia) Cameron McConville; Garry Rogers Motorsport	192 pts
Second	(Australia) Rick Kelly; John Kelly Racing	186 pts
Third	(Australia) Jason Bright; Paul Weel Racing	180 pts

The 2004 V8 Supercars Winton round was a motor race for V8 Supercars held on the weekend of 23–25 July 2004. The event was held at Winton Motor Raceway in Winton, Victoria, Australia, and consisted of one 300 kilometre race. It was the seventh round of thirteen in the 2004 V8 Supercar Championship Series.

The race was notable as Cameron McConville's first victory in the series. The Garry Rogers Motorsport driver had made a controversial last-lap pass on Rick Kelly, with Kelly claiming the move had been made illegally in a yellow-flag zone.

== Results ==
=== Qualifying ===
Pos.	No.	Driver	Team	Car	Time
1	2	(Australia) Mark Skaife	Holden Racing Team	Holden Commodore (VY)	1:38.1434
2	10	(Australia) Jason Bargwanna	Larkham Motorsport	Ford Falcon (BA)	+0.0275
3	1	(Australia) Marcos Ambrose	Stone Brothers Racing	Ford Falcon (BA)	+0.3452
4	6	(Australia) Craig Lowndes	Ford Performance Racing	Ford Falcon (BA)	+0.6856
5	021	(New Zealand) Craig Baird	Team Kiwi Racing	Holden Commodore (VY)	+0.8061
6	34	(Australia) Garth Tander	Garry Rogers Motorsport	Holden Commodore (VY)	+0.8117
7	50	(Australia) Jason Bright	Paul Weel Racing	Holden Commodore (VY)	+1.3008
8	17	(Australia) Steven Johnson	Dick Johnson Racing	Ford Falcon (BA)	+1.3366
9	33	(Australia) Cameron McConville	Garry Rogers Motorsport	Holden Commodore (VY)	+1.3417
10	9	(Australia) Russell Ingall	Stone Brothers Racing	Ford Falcon (BA)	+1.3750
11	16	(Australia) Paul Weel	Paul Weel Racing	Holden Commodore (VY)	+1.4681
12	23	(Australia) David Besnard	WPS Racing	Ford Falcon (BA)	+1.5572
13	7	(Australia) Tony Longhurst	Rod Nash Racing	Holden Commodore (VX)	+1.6177
14	18	(Australia) Warren Luff	Dick Johnson Racing	Ford Falcon (BA)	+1.6574
15	12	(Australia) John Bowe	Brad Jones Racing	Ford Falcon (BA)	+1.6917
16	20	(Australia) Mark Winterbottom	Larkham Motorsport	Ford Falcon (BA)	+1.7714
17	29	(Australia) Paul Morris	Paul Morris Motorsport	Holden Commodore (VY)	+1.8242
18	8	(Australia) Paul Dumbrell	Perkins Engineering	Holden Commodore (VY)	+1.8555
19	48	(Australia) Mark Noske	WPS Racing	Ford Falcon (BA)	+1.8664
20	3	(New Zealand) Jason Richards	Tasman Motorsport	Holden Commodore (VY)	+1.9052
21	11	(New Zealand) Steven Richards	Perkins Engineering	Holden Commodore (VY)	+1.9952
22	22	(Australia) Todd Kelly	Holden Racing Team	Holden Commodore (VY)	+2.0076
23	44	(New Zealand) Simon Wills	Team Dynamik	Holden Commodore (VY)	+2.3424
24	888	(Brazil) Max Wilson	Triple Eight Race Engineering	Ford Falcon (BA)	+2.4489
25	15	(Australia) Rick Kelly	John Kelly Racing	Holden Commodore (VY)	+2.5196
26	21	(Australia) Brad Jones	Brad Jones Racing	Ford Falcon (BA)	+2.5531
27	31	(Australia) Steven Ellery	Steven Ellery Racing	Ford Falcon (BA)	+2.6045
28	75	(Australia) Anthony Tratt	Paul Little Racing	Holden Commodore (VY)	+2.6540
29	45	(Australia) Dale Brede	Team Dynamik	Holden Commodore (VY)	+3.0259
30	14	(Australia) Will Davison	Team Dynamik	Holden Commodore (VY)	+3.0372
31	5	(Australia) Glenn Seton	Ford Performance Racing	Ford Falcon (BA)	+3.0923
32	88	(New Zealand) Paul Radisich	Triple Eight Race Engineering	Ford Falcon (BA)	+3.3702
33	51	(New Zealand) Greg Murphy	John Kelly Racing	Holden Commodore (VY)	+4.9567
DNQ	24	(Australia) Garth Walden	Walden Motorsport	Ford Falcon (AU)	+7.7076
DNQ	43	(Australia) David Krause	David Krause Racing	Holden Commodore (VX)	+12.4507

=== Top Ten Shootout ===
Pos.	No.	Driver	Team	Car	Time
1	021	(New Zealand) Craig Baird	Team Kiwi Racing	Holden Commodore (VY)	1:39.7544
2	34	(Australia) Garth Tander	Garry Rogers Motorsport	Holden Commodore (VY)	+0.3953
3	17	(Australia) Steven Johnson	Dick Johnson Racing	Ford Falcon (BA)	+1.0549
4	1	(Australia) Marcos Ambrose	Stone Brothers Racing	Ford Falcon (BA)	+1.1688
5	9	(Australia) Russell Ingall	Stone Brothers Racing	Ford Falcon (BA)	+1.3180
6	2	(Australia) Mark Skaife	Holden Racing Team	Holden Commodore (VY)	+1.4745
7	6	(Australia) Craig Lowndes	Ford Performance Racing	Ford Falcon (BA)	+1.5064
8	50	(Australia) Jason Bright	Paul Weel Racing	Holden Commodore (VY)	+1.7736
9	10	(Australia) Jason Bargwanna	Larkham Motorsport	Ford Falcon (BA)	+1.7739
10	33	(Australia) Cameron McConville	Garry Rogers Motorsport	Holden Commodore (VY)	+2.2530

=== Race ===
Pos.	No.	Driver	Team	Car	Laps	Time/Retired	Grid	Pts.
1	33	(Australia) Cameron McConville	Garry Rogers Motorsport	Holden Commodore (VY)	100	2:34:18.5237	10	192
2	15	(Australia) Rick Kelly	John Kelly Racing	Holden Commodore (VY)	100	+ 0.219	25	186
3	50	(Australia) Jason Bright	Paul Weel Racing	Holden Commodore (VY)	100	+ 0.469	8	180
4	9	(Australia) Russell Ingall	Stone Brothers Racing	Ford Falcon (BA)	100	+ 2.027	5	174
5	51	(New Zealand) Greg Murphy	John Kelly Racing	Holden Commodore (VY)	100	+ 6.106	33	168
6	31	(Australia) Steven Ellery	Steven Ellery Racing	Ford Falcon (BA)	100	+ 6.537	27	162
7	22	(Australia) Todd Kelly	Holden Racing Team	Holden Commodore (VY)	100	+ 6.722	22	156
8	29	(Australia) Paul Morris	Paul Morris Motorsport	Holden Commodore (VY)	100	+ 11.462	17	150
9	34	(Australia) Garth Tander	Garry Rogers Motorsport	Holden Commodore (VY)	100	+ 12.298	2	144
10	5	(Australia) Glenn Seton	Ford Performance Racing	Ford Falcon (BA)	100	+ 12.795	31	138
11	3	(New Zealand) Jason Richards	Tasman Motorsport	Holden Commodore (VY)	100	+ 14.045	20	132
12	45	(Australia) Dale Brede	Team Dynamik	Holden Commodore (VY)	100	+ 14.592	29	126
13	11	(New Zealand) Steven Richards	Perkins Engineering	Holden Commodore (VY)	100	+ 17.689	21	120
14	75	(Australia) Anthony Tratt	Paul Little Racing	Holden Commodore (VY)	100	+ 18.194	28	114
15	10	(Australia) Jason Bargwanna	Larkham Motorsport	Ford Falcon (BA)	100	+ 20.416	9	108
16	8	(Australia) Paul Dumbrell	Perkins Engineering	Holden Commodore (VY)	100	+ 21.384	18	102
17	7	(Australia) Tony Longhurst	Rod Nash Racing	Holden Commodore (VX)	100	+ 22.038	13	96
18	12	(Australia) John Bowe	Brad Jones Racing	Ford Falcon (BA)	100	+ 1:11.162	15	90
19	88	(New Zealand) Paul Radisich	Triple Eight Race Engineering	Ford Falcon (BA)	99	+ 1 lap	32	84
20	18	(Australia) Warren Luff	Dick Johnson Racing	Ford Falcon (BA)	99	+ 1 lap	14	78
21	48	(Australia) Mark Noske	WPS Racing	Ford Falcon (BA)	99	+ 1 lap	19	72
22	021	(New Zealand) Craig Baird	Team Kiwi Racing	Holden Commodore (VY)	98	+ 2 laps	1	66
23	44	(New Zealand) Simon Wills	Team Dynamik	Holden Commodore (VY)	97	+ 3 laps	23	60
24	21	(Australia) Brad Jones	Brad Jones Racing	Ford Falcon (BA)	97	+ 3 laps	26	54
25	20	(Australia) Mark Winterbottom	Larkham Motorsport	Ford Falcon (BA)	97	+ 3 laps	16	48
26	1	(Australia) Marcos Ambrose	Stone Brothers Racing	Ford Falcon (BA)	82	+ 18 laps	4	42
27	6	(Australia) Craig Lowndes	Ford Performance Racing	Ford Falcon (BA)	79	+ 21 laps	7	36
28	2	(Australia) Mark Skaife	Holden Racing Team	Holden Commodore (VY)	75	+ 25 laps	6	30
Ret	17	(Australia) Steven Johnson	Dick Johnson Racing	Ford Falcon (BA)	95		3	
Ret	888	(Brazil) Max Wilson	Triple Eight Race Engineering	Ford Falcon (BA)	94		24	
Ret	23	(Australia) David Besnard	WPS Racing	Ford Falcon (BA)	54		12	
Ret	16	(Australia) Paul Weel	Paul Weel Racing	Holden Commodore (VY)	49		11	
Ret	14	(Australia) Will Davison	Team Dynamik	Holden Commodore (VY)	1		30	
Fastest Lap: Mark Skaife (Holden Racing Team), 1:24.7913

== Championship standings ==
Pos.	Driver	Pts	Gap
1	(Australia) Jason Bright	1131	
2	(New Zealand) Steven Richards	1126	-5
3	(Australia) Rick Kelly	1116	-15
4	(Australia) Marcos Ambrose	1106	-25
5	(Australia) Russell Ingall	982	-149

- Note: Only the top five positions are included.
