= 2004 V8 Supercar Championship Series =

Motor racing competition

The 2004 V8 Supercar Championship Series was an Australian racing series for V8 Supercars. It began on 21 March 2004 at the Adelaide Street Circuit and ended on 5 December at Eastern Creek Raceway after 13 rounds. It was the sixth running of the V8 Supercar Championship Series. The series winner was also awarded the 45th Australian Touring Car Championship title by the Confederation of Australian Motor Sport.

The championship was won by Marcos Ambrose of the Stone Brothers Racing.

== Calendar ==
The 2004 V8 Supercar Championship Series comprised 13 rounds which included 11 sprint rounds and two endurance rounds.

Rd.	Event	Circuit	City / state	Date
1	(Australia) Clipsal 500	Adelaide Street Circuit	Adelaide, South Australia	18–21 March
2	(Australia) Eastern Creek	Eastern Creek Raceway	Eastern Creek, New South Wales	2–4 April
3	(New Zealand) PlaceMakers V8 International	Pukekohe Park Raceway	Pukekohe, New Zealand	30 April – 2 May
4	(Australia) Darwin	Hidden Valley Raceway	Darwin, Northern Territory	21–23 May
5	(Australia) Perth	Barbagallo Raceway	Perth, Western Australia	11–13 June
6	(Australia) Ipswich	Queensland Raceway	Ipswich, Queensland	2–4 July
7	(Australia) Winton	Winton Motor Raceway	Benalla, Victoria	23–25 July
8	(Australia) Oran Park	Oran Park Raceway	Sydney, New South Wales	13–15 August
9	(Australia) Betta Electrical Sandown 500	Sandown International Raceway	Melbourne, Victoria	10–12 September
10	(Australia) Bob Jane T-Marts 1000	Mount Panorama Circuit	Bathurst, New South Wales	7–10 October
11	(Australia) Gillette V8 Supercar Challenge	Surfers Paradise Street Circuit	Surfers Paradise, Queensland	21–24 October
12	(Australia) Launceston	Symmons Plains Raceway	Launceston, Tasmania	12–14 November
13	(Australia) BigPond Grand Finale	Eastern Creek Raceway	Eastern Creek, New South Wales	3–5 December

Australian rounds

New Zealand rounds

== Teams and drivers ==
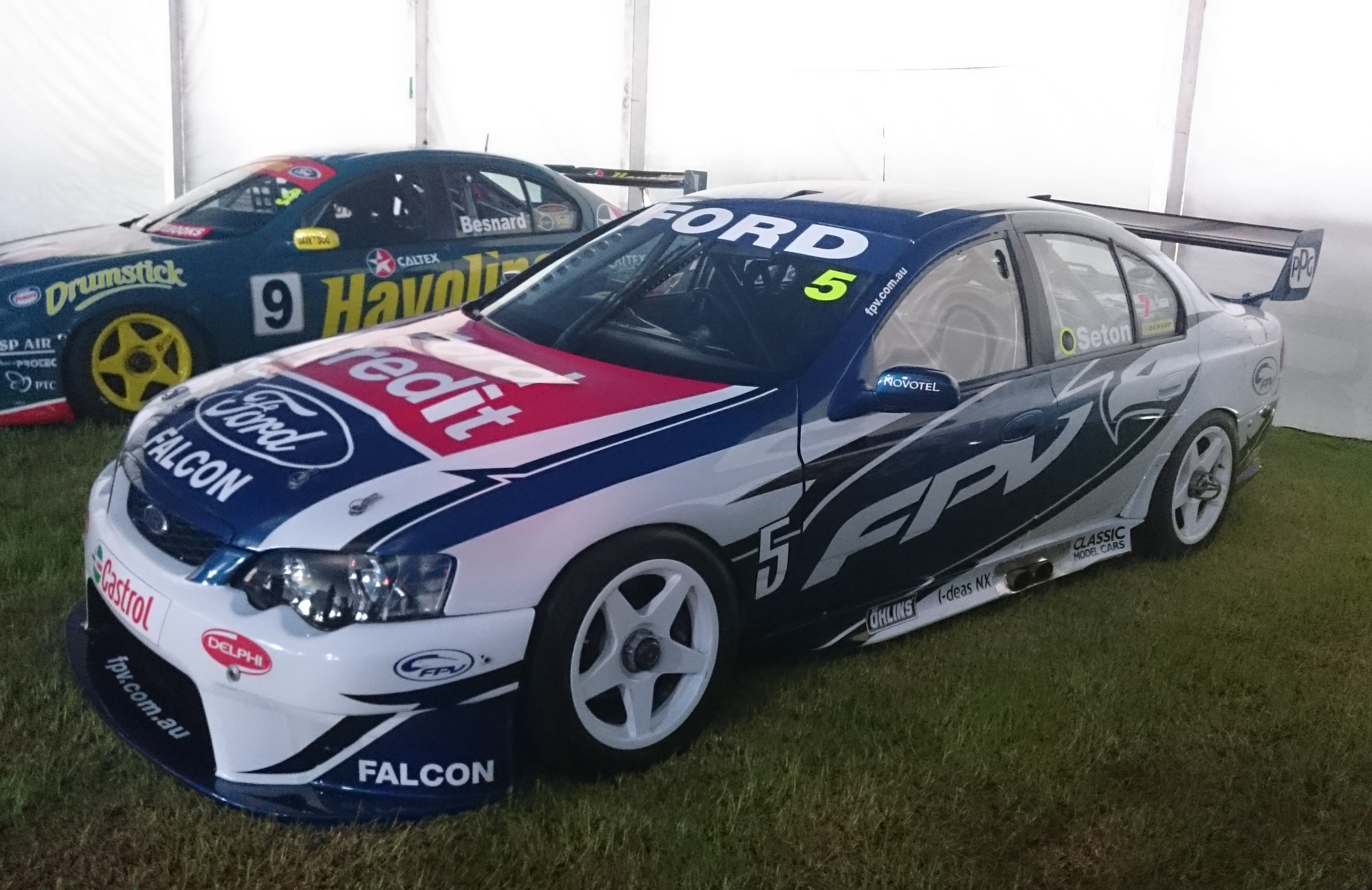
Glenn Seton placed 15th in the Championship driving a Ford Falcon BA for Ford Performance Racing. The car is pictured in 2018.

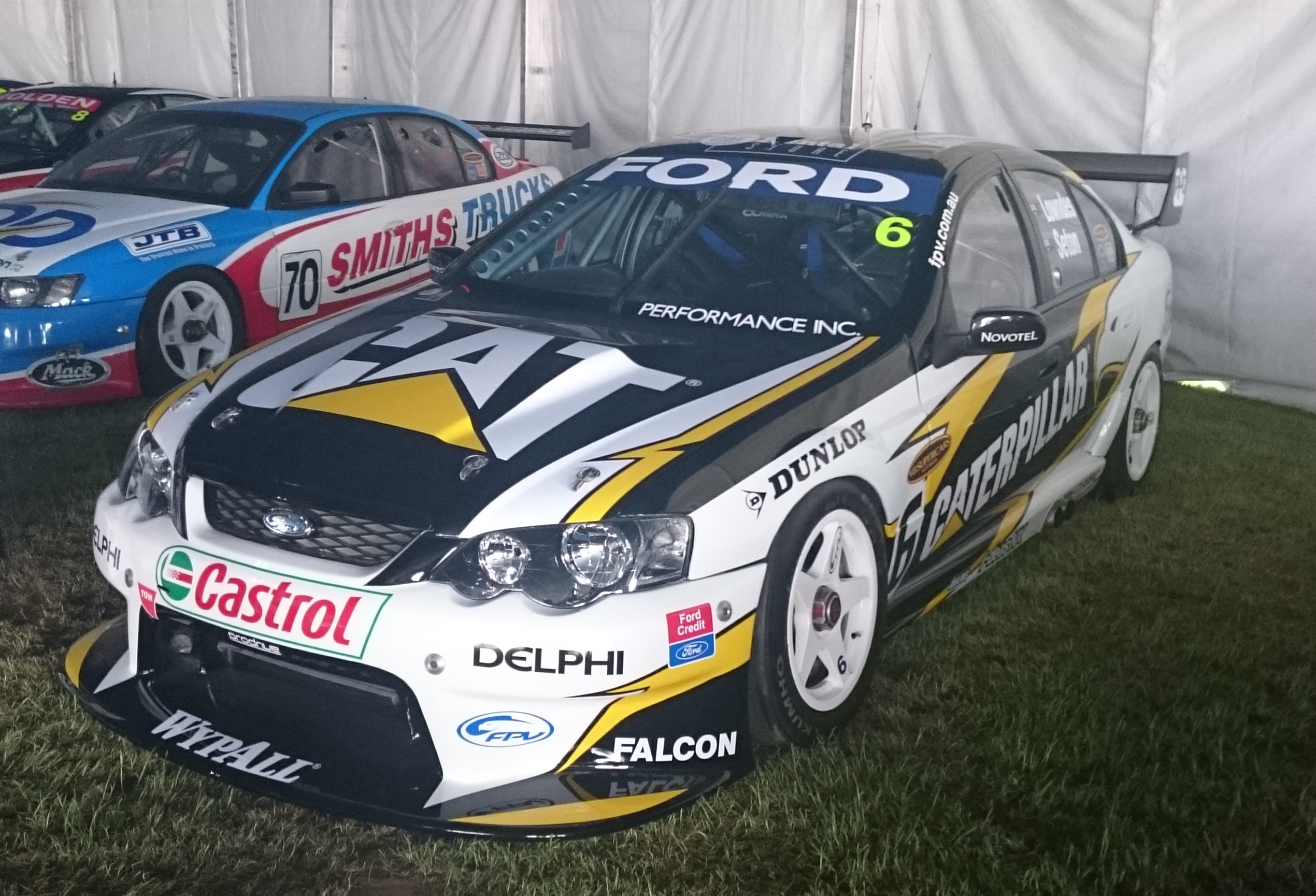
Craig Lowndes placed 20th in the Championship driving this Ford Falcon BA for Ford Performance Racing. The car is pictured in 2018.

The following drivers and teams competed in the 2004 V8 Supercar Championship Series. The series comprised eleven sprint rounds and two endurance rounds (the Sandown 500 and the Bathurst 1000) with each car driven by two drivers in the endurance rounds.

Manufacturer	Vehicle	Team	No.	Driver	Events	Endurance round co-driver
Ford	Falcon AU	Walden Motorsport	24	(Australia) Garth Walden	6–10, 13	(Australia) Grant Elliott
Ford	Falcon BA	Stone Brothers Racing	1	(Australia) Marcos Ambrose	All	(Australia) Greg Ritter
Ford	Falcon BA	Stone Brothers Racing	9	(Australia) Russell Ingall	All	(Australia) Cameron McLean
Ford	Falcon BA	Ford Performance Racing	5	(Australia) Glenn Seton	All	(Switzerland) Alain Menu (Australia) Adam Macrow
Ford	Falcon BA	Ford Performance Racing	6	(Australia) Craig Lowndes	All	(Switzerland) Alain Menu (Australia) Adam Macrow
Ford	Falcon BA	Larkham Motorsport	10	(Australia) Jason Bargwanna	All	(Australia) Mark Larkham (New Zealand) Matt Halliday
Ford	Falcon BA	Larkham Motorsport	20	(Australia) Mark Winterbottom	All	(Australia) Mark Larkham (New Zealand) Matt Halliday
Ford	Falcon BA	Brad Jones Racing	12	(Australia) John Bowe	All	(United Kingdom) John Cleland (Australia) Andrew Jones
Ford	Falcon BA	Brad Jones Racing	21	(Australia) Brad Jones	All	(United Kingdom) John Cleland (Australia) Andrew Jones
Ford	Falcon BA	Dick Johnson Racing	17	(Australia) Steven Johnson	All	(Australia) Owen Kelly (Australia) David Brabham
Ford	Falcon BA	Dick Johnson Racing	18	(Australia) Warren Luff	All	(Australia) Owen Kelly (Australia) David Brabham
Ford	Falcon BA	WPS Racing	23	(Australia) David Besnard	1–10, 12–13	(Australia) Charlie O'Brien* (New Zealand) John McIntyre**
Ford	Falcon BA	WPS Racing	23	(New Zealand) John McIntyre	11	(Australia) Charlie O'Brien* (New Zealand) John McIntyre**
Ford	Falcon BA	WPS Racing	48	(Australia) Mark Noske	4–8	(New Zealand) John McIntyre* (Australia) Neil McFadyen**
Ford	Falcon BA	WPS Racing	48	(Malaysia) Alex Yoong	9–11	(New Zealand) John McIntyre* (Australia) Neil McFadyen**
Ford	Falcon BA	WPS Racing	48	(Australia) Owen Kelly	12–13	(New Zealand) John McIntyre* (Australia) Neil McFadyen**
Ford	Falcon BA	Steven Ellery Racing	31	(Australia) Steven Ellery	All	(Australia) Luke Youlden
Ford	Falcon BA	Triple Eight Race Engineering	88	(New Zealand) Paul Radisich	All	(France) Yvan Muller (Australia) Dean Canto
Ford	Falcon BA	Triple Eight Race Engineering	888	(Brazil) Max Wilson	All	(France) Yvan Muller (Australia) Dean Canto
Ford	Falcon BA	Thexton Motor Racing	99	(New Zealand) David Thexton	1–2	—N/a
Holden	Commodore VX	Tasman Motorsport	3	(New Zealand) Jason Richards	1–7	(New Zealand) Fabian Coulthard
Holden	Commodore VX	Tasman Motorsport	43	(New Zealand) Fabian Coulthard	8	—N/a
Holden	Commodore VX	Rod Nash Racing (PE)	7	(Australia) Tony Longhurst	1–8, 11	(Australia) Jamie Whincup
Holden	Commodore VX	Rod Nash Racing (PE)	7	(Australia) Alex Davison	9–10, 12	(Australia) Jamie Whincup
Holden	Commodore VX	Imrie Motorsport	14	(Australia) Terry Wyhoon	1	—N/a
Holden	Commodore VX	Imrie Motorsport	24	(Australia) Phillip Scifleet	1–2	—N/a
Holden	Commodore VX	MSport	14	(New Zealand) Mark Porter	2–3	—N/a
Holden	Commodore VX	David Krause Racing	43	(Australia) David Krause	1–2, 6–7	—N/a
Holden	Commodore VX	John Faulkner Racing	43	(Australia) Christian D'Agostin	9–10, 13	(Australia) Kurt Wimmer
Holden	Commodore VY	Holden Racing Team	2	(Australia) Mark Skaife	All	(Australia) Todd Kelly
Holden	Commodore VY	Holden Racing Team	22	(Australia) Todd Kelly	1–8, 11–13	(United Kingdom) Jason Plato
Holden	Commodore VY	Holden Racing Team	22	(Australia) Peter Brock	9–10	(United Kingdom) Jason Plato
Holden	Commodore VY	Tasman Motorsport	3	(New Zealand) Jason Richards	8–13	—N/a
Holden	Commodore VY	Rod Nash Racing (PE)	7	(Australia) Alex Davison	13	—N/a
Holden	Commodore VY	Perkins Engineering	8	(Australia) Paul Dumbrell	All	(Australia) Tony Longhurst
Holden	Commodore VY	Perkins Engineering	11	(New Zealand) Steven Richards	All	(New Zealand) Jim Richards
Holden	Commodore VY	Team Dynamik	14	(Australia) Neil McFadyen	6	—N/a
Holden	Commodore VY	Team Dynamik	14	(Australia) Will Davison	7–8	—N/a
Holden	Commodore VY	Team Dynamik	44	(New Zealand) Simon Wills	All	(Australia) Paul Stokell
Holden	Commodore VY	Team Dynamik	45	(Australia) Dale Brede	All	(Australia) Will Davison
Holden	Commodore VY	Robert Smith Racing	14	(Australia) Lee Holdsworth	9–10, 13	(Australia) Phillip Scifleet* (Australia) Mark Noske**
Holden	Commodore VY	John Kelly Racing (HRT)	15	(Australia) Rick Kelly	All	(Australia) Tim Leahey (Australia) Steve Owen
Holden	Commodore VY	John Kelly Racing (HRT)	51	(New Zealand) Greg Murphy	All	(Australia) Tim Leahey (Australia) Steve Owen
Holden	Commodore VY	Paul Weel Racing	16	(Australia) Paul Weel	All	(Australia) Matthew White (Australia) Marcus Marshall
Holden	Commodore VY	Paul Weel Racing	50	(Australia) Jason Bright	All	(Australia) Matthew White (Australia) Marcus Marshall
Holden	Commodore VY	Team Kiwi Racing	021	(New Zealand) Craig Baird	All	(New Zealand) Mark Porter
Holden	Commodore VY	Paul Morris Motorsport	29	(Australia) Paul Morris	All	(Australia) Alan Gurr
Holden	Commodore VY	Garry Rogers Motorsport	33	(Australia) Cameron McConville	All	(Australia) Nathan Pretty (Denmark) Allan Simonsen
Holden	Commodore VY	Garry Rogers Motorsport	34	(Australia) Garth Tander	All	(Australia) Nathan Pretty (Denmark) Allan Simonsen
Holden	Commodore VY	Paul Little Racing	75	(Australia) Anthony Tratt	All	(Australia) Tomas Mezera

* = Drove in Sandown 500 only

** = Drove in Bathurst 1000 only

== Results and standings ==
=== Results summary ===
Round	Race	Event	Pole position	Race winners	Round winner	Report
1	R1	Adelaide	(New Zealand) Greg Murphy	(Australia) Marcos Ambrose	(Australia) Marcos Ambrose (Stone Brothers Racing, Ford)	report
1	R2	Adelaide		(Australia) Marcos Ambrose	(Australia) Marcos Ambrose (Stone Brothers Racing, Ford)	report
2		Eastern Creek 1	(Australia) Marcos Ambrose	(Australia) Rick Kelly (John Kelly Racing, Holden)		report
3	R1	Pukekohe	(Australia) Mark Skaife	(Australia) Marcos Ambrose	(Australia) Jason Bright (Paul Weel Racing, Holden)	report
3	R2	Pukekohe		(Australia) Jason Bright	(Australia) Jason Bright (Paul Weel Racing, Holden)	report
3	R3	Pukekohe		(Australia) Jason Bright	(Australia) Jason Bright (Paul Weel Racing, Holden)	report
4	R1	Darwin	(Australia) Mark Skaife	(Australia) Russell Ingall	(Australia) Todd Kelly (Holden Racing Team, Holden)	report
4	R2	Darwin		(Australia) Rick Kelly	(Australia) Todd Kelly (Holden Racing Team, Holden)	report
4	R3	Darwin		(Australia) Todd Kelly	(Australia) Todd Kelly (Holden Racing Team, Holden)	report
5	R1	Perth	(New Zealand) Steven Richards	(Australia) Mark Skaife	(Australia) Jason Bright (Paul Weel Racing, Holden)	report
5	R2	Perth		(Australia) Jason Bright	(Australia) Jason Bright (Paul Weel Racing, Holden)	report
5	R3	Perth		(Australia) Jason Bright	(Australia) Jason Bright (Paul Weel Racing, Holden)	report
6		Ipswich	(Australia) Marcos Ambrose	(Australia) Marcos Ambrose (Stone Brothers Racing, Ford)		report
7		Winton	(New Zealand) Craig Baird	(Australia) Cameron McConville (Garry Rogers Motorsport, Holden)		report
8	R1	Oran Park	(Australia) Mark Skaife	(Australia) Mark Skaife	(Australia) Marcos Ambrose (Stone Brothers Racing, Ford)	report
8	R2	Oran Park		(Australia) Marcos Ambrose	(Australia) Marcos Ambrose (Stone Brothers Racing, Ford)	report
9		Sandown	(Australia) Rick Kelly	(Australia) Marcos Ambrose (Australia) Greg Ritter (Stone Brothers Racing, Ford)		report
10		Bathurst	(New Zealand) Steven Richards	(New Zealand) Greg Murphy (Australia) Rick Kelly (John Kelly Racing, Holden)		report
11	R1	Gold Coast	(Australia) Mark Skaife	(Australia) Marcos Ambrose	(New Zealand) Greg Murphy (John Kelly Racing, Holden)	report
11	R2	Gold Coast		(New Zealand) Greg Murphy	(New Zealand) Greg Murphy (John Kelly Racing, Holden)	report
12	R1	Launceston	(New Zealand) Steven Richards	(Australia) Rick Kelly	(Australia) Russell Ingall (Stone Brothers Racing, Ford)	report
12	R2	Launceston		(Australia) Marcos Ambrose	(Australia) Russell Ingall (Stone Brothers Racing, Ford)	report
12	R3	Launceston		(Australia) David Besnard	(Australia) Russell Ingall (Stone Brothers Racing, Ford)	report
13	R1	Eastern Creek 2	(Australia) Marcos Ambrose	(Australia) Marcos Ambrose	(Australia) Marcos Ambrose (Stone Brothers Racing, Ford)	report
13	R2	Eastern Creek 2		(Australia) Marcos Ambrose	(Australia) Marcos Ambrose (Stone Brothers Racing, Ford)	report
13	R3	Eastern Creek 2		(Australia) Marcos Ambrose	(Australia) Marcos Ambrose (Stone Brothers Racing, Ford)	report

=== Drivers championship ===
Pos.	Driver	No.	Car	ADE (South Australia)		EAS1 (New South Wales)	PUK (New Zealand)			HID (Northern Territory)			BAR (Western Australia)			QLD (Queensland)	WIN (Victoria (state))	ORA (New South Wales)		SAN (Victoria (state))	BAT (New South Wales)	SUR (Queensland)		SYM (Tasmania)			EAS2 (New South Wales)			Pen.	Pts.
1	(Australia) Marcos Ambrose	1	Ford BA Falcon	1	**1**	**7**	1	**3**	3	3	13	2	3	4	3	**1**	26	2	1	1	4	1	**2**	2	1	**Ret**	**1**	**1**	**1**	0	2174
2	(Australia) Russell Ingall	9	Ford BA Falcon	3	Ret	14	12	7	7	1	**11**	5	9	17	13	4	4	3	4	2	6	25	10	7	5	5	7	9	3	0	1936
3	(Australia) Jason Bright	50	Holden VY Commodore	14	3	13	2	1	**1**	4	17	10	2	1	**1**	5	3	4	3	10	12	7	Ret	10	24	2	3	21	23	0	1920
4	(New Zealand) Greg Murphy	51	Holden VY Commodore	**4**	9	5	4	2	2	13	4	4	7	3	16	Ret	5	11	12	5	1	2	1	11	4	4	13	24	18	0	1913
5	(New Zealand) Steven Richards	11	Holden VY Commodore	2	2	4	6	5	4	5	3	3	**Ret**	6	2	2	13	10	11	15	**21**	Ret	Ret	**4**	13	6	8	4	8	0	1819
6	(Australia) Rick Kelly	15	Holden VY Commodore	12	6	1	7	4	5	6	1	**21**	4	2	4	15	2	30	9	**5**	1	21	25	1	**2**	Ret	5	Ret	15	50	1793
7	(Australia) Todd Kelly	22	Holden VY Commodore	Ret	10	19	17	10	14	2	2	1	11	8	10	9	7	5	7	23	14	3	DSQ	3	3	Ret	27	12	5	0	1623
8	(Australia) Jason Bargwanna	10	Ford BA Falcon	21	5	8	27	Ret	21	7	7	19	18	Ret	19	25	15	6	14	6	5	5	3	22	11	21	10	11	16	0	1526
9	(Australia) John Bowe	12	Ford BA Falcon	9	15	18	10	22	12	8	6	6	8	7	7	Ret	18	12	18	7	3	14	16	17	14	16	21	15	12	0	1502
10	(Australia) Steven Johnson	17	Ford BA Falcon	20	Ret	6	13	8	8	Ret	19	11	13	10	11	24	Ret	32	17	3	7	11	9	13	10	8	9	6	13	0	1416
11	(Australia) Garth Tander	34	Holden VY Commodore	19	DNS	3	28	11	10	15	20	8	5	5	6	3	9	21	28	4	Ret	22	11	5	28	Ret	Ret	18	10	0	1396
12	(Australia) Mark Skaife	2	Holden VY Commodore	7	17	22	**16**	Ret	19	**14**	9	7	1	**15**	9	Ret	28	**1**	**2**	23	14	**24**	13	Ret	Ret	3	18	7	2	0	1294
13	(Australia) Cameron McConville	33	Holden VY Commodore	17	Ret	25	19	18	26	23	18	27	6	Ret	18	10	1	8	22	4	Ret	10	6	15	7	7	12	10	6	72	1292
14	(New Zealand) Jason Richards	3	Holden VY Commodore	Ret	8	Ret	14	9	9	25	27	Ret	20	12	14	Ret	11	7	8	9	20	9	8	25	25	20	17	5	9	0	1245
15	(Australia) Glenn Seton	5	Ford BA Falcon	10	Ret	15	29	21	22	18	12	14	Ret	21	Ret	13	10	DNS	21	18	2	15	19	28	19	17	14	13	22	0	1237
16	(Australia) Brad Jones	21	Ford BA Falcon	13	Ret	23	20	20	18	Ret	15	16	12	13	12	12	24	20	31	7	3	13	Ret	12	9	24	19	19	14	0	1235
17	(Australia) Paul Weel	16	Holden VY Commodore	5	4	29	11	6	6	17	8	Ret	10	14	5	Ret	Ret	9	5	10	12	26	15	18	27	Ret	DNS	17	26	0	1192
18	(Australia) Mark Winterbottom	20	Ford BA Falcon	15	Ret	12	25	14	Ret	11	10	23	19	16	15	21	25	23	Ret	6	5	16	12	19	17	11	28	22	33	0	1190
19	(New Zealand) Paul Radisich	88	Ford BA Falcon	Ret	7	20	3	16	11	9	16	25	Ret	Ret	29	6	19	14	13	Ret	Ret	12	7	9	21	14	6	2	4	0	1188
20	(Australia) Craig Lowndes	6	Ford BA Falcon	Ret	Ret	2	8	29	Ret	12	5	9	21	Ret	DNS	Ret	27	19	26	18	2	4	Ret	6	6	13	2	3	Ret	0	1182
21	(Australia) Warren Luff	18	Ford BA Falcon	11	Ret	21	24	27	23	22	22	24	15	Ret	23	16	20	24	20	3	7	Ret	26	16	12	9	15	14	20	0	1149
22	(Australia) Paul Morris	29	Holden VY Commodore	6	16	11	21	15	Ret	29	24	15	Ret	11	26	23	8	13	10	17	Ret	20	14	Ret	30	19	29	23	7	50	1071
23	(Australia) Anthony Tratt	75	Holden VY Commodore	Ret	13	26	22	19	16	24	30	Ret	25	22	24	11	14	22	24	12	18	17	20	21	26	22	20	26	25	0	1047
24	(Australia) Paul Dumbrell	8	Holden VY Commodore	8	11	30	30	24	27	20	14	17	24	20	27	7	16	18	23	8	Ret	Ret	17	24	23	23	16	25	24	0	1018
25	(Australia) Steve Ellery	31	Ford BA Falcon	Ret	Ret	Ret	18	26	24	21	26	18	17	9	8	Ret	6	17	29	22	16	18	21	14	8	10	11	33	28	0	991
26	(New Zealand) Simon Wills	44	Holden VY Commodore	Ret	Ret	16	15	12	15	30	25	12	Ret	Ret	21	Ret	23	15	6	Ret	13	6	4	Ret	16	12	26	Ret	19	0	929
27	(New Zealand) Craig Baird	021	Holden VY Commodore	16	12	9	9	17	20	16	31	20	23	Ret	DNS	17	**22**	31	15	13	Ret	Ret	22	27	Ret	DNS	Ret	16	17	0	925
28	(Brazil) Max Wilson	888	Ford BA Falcon	Ret	Ret	10	5	28	17	10	Ret	22	16	23	17	14	Ret	Ret	Ret	Ret	Ret	8	5	26	15	15	22	8	11	0	865
29	(Australia) Tony Longhurst	7	Holden VY Commodore	DNS	DNS	24	26	13	13	26	23	13	14	19	20	8	17	16	16	8	Ret	23	Ret							0	856
30	(Australia) David Besnard	23	Ford BA Falcon	18	14	17	23	23	25	19	28	Ret	Ret	Ret	22	19	Ret	26	30	16	Ret			8	29	1	4	20	21	0	790
31	(Australia) Dale Brede	45	Holden VY Commodore	Ret	DNS	27	31	Ret	29	28	29	28	26	24	28	Ret	12	25	25	Ret	Ret	Ret	24	Ret	18	25	25	30	30	0	393
32	(Australia) Greg Ritter	1	Ford BA Falcon																	1	4									0	372
33	(Australia) Cameron McLean	9	Ford BA Falcon																	2	6									0	360
34	(New Zealand) Fabian Coulthard	43/3	Holden VY Commodore															29	19	9	20									0	330
35	(Australia) Mark Noske	48/14	Ford BA Falcon							27	21	26	22	18	25	20	21	27	27		Ret									0	304
36	(Malaysia) Alex Yoong	48	Ford BA Falcon																	21	15	Ret	23							0	278
37	(Australia) Tomas Mezera	75	Holden VY Commodore																	12	18									0	272
38	(Australia) Alex Davison	7	Holden VX Commodore; Holden VY Commodore																	Ret	9			20	20	Ret	23	27	27	0	256
39	(New Zealand) Jim Richards	11	Holden VY Commodore																	15	21									0	248
40	(Australia) Christian D'Agostin	43	Holden VX Commodore																	20	19						Ret	31	Ret	0	240
40	(Australia) Luke Youlden	31	Ford BA Falcon																	22	16									0	240
42	(Australia) Kurt Wimmer	43	Holden VX Commodore																	20	19									0	236
43	(Australia) Neil McFadyen	14/48	Holden VY Commodore; Ford BA Falcon													18					15									0	226
44	(Australia) Owen Kelly	18/48	Ford BA Falcon																	Ret	17			23	22	18	Ret	28	31	0	214
45	(New Zealand) Mark Porter	14/021	Holden VY Commodore			28	32	25	28											13	Ret									0	202
46	(New Zealand) John McIntyre	48/23	Ford BA Falcon																	21	Ret	19	18							0	199
47	(Australia) Garth Walden	24	Ford AU Falcon													22	DNQ	28	Ret	24	Ret						Ret	32	32	0	185
48	(Australia) Tim Leahey	51	Holden VY Commodore																	Ret	8									0	164
48	(Australia) Steve Owen	51	Holden VY Commodore																	Ret	8									0	164
50	(Australia) Jamie Whincup	7	Holden VX Commodore																	Ret	9									0	160
51	(Australia) Nathan Pretty	33	Holden VY Commodore																	Ret	10									0	156
51	(Denmark) Allan Simonsen	33	Holden VY Commodore																	Ret	10									0	156
53	(New Zealand) Matt Halliday	20	Ford BA Falcon																	Ret	11									0	152
53	(Australia) Mark Larkham	20	Ford BA Falcon																	Ret	11									0	152
53	(Australia) Marcus Marshall	16	Holden VY Commodore																	11	DNS									0	152
53	(Australia) Matthew White	16	Holden VY Commodore																	11	DNS									0	152
57	(Australia) Paul Stokell	44	Holden VY Commodore																	Ret	13									0	144
58	(Australia) Peter Brock	05	Holden VY Commodore																	14	Ret									0	140
58	(United Kingdom) Jason Plato	05	Holden VY Commodore																	14	Ret									0	140
60	(Australia) Charlie O'Brien	23	Ford BA Falcon																	16										0	132
61	(Australia) David Brabham	18	Ford BA Falcon																	Ret	17									0	128
61	(Australia) Alan Gurr	29	Holden VY Commodore																	17	Ret									0	128
63	(Australia) Adam Macrow	5	Ford BA Falcon																	19	Ret									0	120
63	(Switzerland) Alain Menu	5	Ford BA Falcon																	19	Ret									0	120
65	(Australia) Grant Elliott	24	Ford AU Falcon																	24	Ret									0	100
66	(Australia) Lee Holdsworth	14	Holden VY Commodore																	Ret	Ret						24	29	29	0	34
	(Australia) Will Davison	14/45	Holden VY Commodore														Ret	DNS	DSQ	Ret	Ret									0	0
	(Australia) Phillip Scifleet	24/14	Holden VX Commodore; Holden VY Commodore	Ret	DNS	DNQ														Ret										0	0
	(Australia) Dean Canto	888	Ford BA Falcon																	Ret	Ret									0	0
	(France) Yvan Muller	888	Ford BA Falcon																	Ret	Ret									0	0
	(United Kingdom) John Cleland	21	Ford BA Falcon																	Ret	Ret									0	0
	(Australia) Andrew Jones	21	Ford BA Falcon																	Ret	Ret									0	0
	(Australia) David Krause	43	Holden VX Commodore	DNQ	DNQ											DNQ	DNQ													0	0
	(New Zealand) David Thexton	99	Ford BA Falcon	DNQ	DNQ	DNQ																								0	0
	(Australia) Terry Wyhoon	14	Holden VX Commodore	DNQ	DNQ																									0	0
Pos.	Driver	No.	Car	ADE (South Australia)		EAS1 (New South Wales)	PUK (New Zealand)			HID (Northern Territory)			BAR (Western Australia)			QLD (Queensland)	WIN (Victoria (state))	ORA (New South Wales)		SAN (Victoria (state))	BAT (New South Wales)	SUR (Queensland)		SYM (Tasmania)			EAS2 (New South Wales)			Pen.	Pts.

Colour	Result
Gold	Winner
Silver	Second place
Bronze	Third place
Green	Points classification
Blue	Non-points classification
Blue	Non-classified finish (NC)
Purple	Retired, not classified (Ret)
Red	Did not qualify (DNQ)
Red	Did not pre-qualify (DNPQ)
Black	Disqualified (DSQ)
White	Did not start (DNS)
White	Withdrew (WD)
White	Race cancelled (C)
Blank	Did not practice (DNP)
Blank	Did not arrive (DNA)
Blank	Excluded (EX)

Bold - Pole position
Italics - Fastest lap

== See also ==
2004 V8 Supercar season
