= Team Dynamik =

Australian motor racing team

- Manufacturer: Holden
- Team Principal: Kieran Wills
- Race Drivers: Jason Richards (2003); Simon Wills (2003-05); Nicolas Minassian (2003); Wayne Wakefield (2003); Jan Magnussen (2003); Dale Brede (2004); Will Davison (2004); Tony Longhurst (2005); Max Wilson (2005); Mark Porter (2005); Kayne Scott (2005)
- Chassis: Commodore VY; Commodore VZ
- Debut: 2001
- Drivers' Championships: 1

Team Dynamik was an Australian motor racing team that competed in Australian V8 Supercar racing between 2001 and 2005.

== History ==
Owned by Kieran Wills, Adelaide based Team Dynamik debuted in the 2001 with Simon Wills racing an ex Gibson Motorsport Holden Commodore VT to victory in the Development Series.

In 2003, the team entered the V8 Supercar Championship Series after purchasing a Level 1 franchise with two licences from Romano Racing and entering Holden Commodore VYs for Wills and Jason Richards. The year was highlighted by a strong performance at the Sandown 500, where the car ran second to Mark Skaife until an incident with two laps remaining put them out of the race.

In 2004 Richards was replaced by Dale Brede. A third car appeared at two rounds with Will Davison driving. In August 2004, Team Dynamik conducted an unauthorised test at Woomera Test Range and were fined $132,000.

In 2005, Will Davison was contracted to drive, while the second licence was sold to Tony Longhurst, who contracted Team Dynamik to prepare a car with Max Wilson driving. However, after the opening race at the Australian Grand Prix, the team advised Davison it was unable to fulfill its contract for him to drive the second car.

In September 2005, Longhurst purchased the second licence. After announcing his intention to relocate the team to Queensland, in 2006 Longhurst on-sold the licences to Paul Morris Motorsport and Rod Nash Racing. This resulted in legal action, with Team Dynamik claiming a share of the profits Longhurst made.

== Drivers ==
=== Supercars Drivers ===
- (New Zealand) Simon Wills (2003-2005)
- (New Zealand) Jason Richards (2003)
- (France) Nicolas Minassian (2003)
- (Australia) Wayne Wakefield (2003)
- (Denmark) Jan Magnussen (2003)
- (Australia) Dale Brede (2004)
- (Australia) Neil McFadyen (2004)
- (Australia) Will Davison (2004)
- (Australia) Paul Stokell (2004)
- (Australia) Tony Longhurst (2005)
- (Brazil) Max Wilson (2005)
- (New Zealand) Mark Porter (2005)
- (New Zealand) Kayne Scott (2005)

=== Super2 Drivers ===
- (New Zealand) Simon Wills (2001)
