= 2003 V8 Supercars Darwin round =

Motor race

(Northern Territory) 2003 V8 Supercars Darwin round
Event Information
- Round 6 of 13 in the 2003 V8 Supercar Championship Series
- Date: 27–29 June 2003
- Location: Darwin, Northern Territory
- Venue: Hidden Valley Raceway
- Weather: Sunny

Results
Race 1
| Distance | 17 laps | 50 km |
| Pole position | Mark Skaife; Holden Racing Team | 21:59.5111 |
| Winner | Mark Skaife; Holden Racing Team | 42:44.5643 |
Race 2
| Distance | 35 laps | 100 km |
| Winner | Marcos Ambrose; Stone Brothers Racing | 45:03.2352 |
Race 3
| Distance | 35 laps | 100 km |
| Winner | Marcos Ambrose; Stone Brothers Racing | 52:06.2762 |
Round Results
| First | Marcos Ambrose; Stone Brothers Racing | 190 pts |
| Second | Mark Skaife; Holden Racing Team | 186 pts |
| Third | Jason Bright; Paul Weel Racing | 176 pts |

The 2003 V8 Supercars Darwin round was the sixth round of the 2003 V8 Supercar Championship Series. It was held on the weekend of 27 to 29 June at the Hidden Valley Raceway in Darwin, Northern Territory.

The weekend was a close-fought battle between the forerunners of the Holden and Ford marques – Mark Skaife and Marcos Ambrose. Each driver traded sessions with Ambrose claiming provisional pole position and Skaife striking back in the shootout to take pole position for the first race. Skaife held off Ambrose to win the first race and in the second race, Ambrose would take victory after a late-race restart fiasco involving Jamie Whincup. The third and final race was won by Ambrose and thus allowed him to take overall round honours ahead of Skaife. Jason Bright would take third in overall points for the weekend to help maintain his championship lead.

== Background ==
The event was held on the weekend of 27 to 29 June 2003. It was the sixth V8 Supercar event to be held at Hidden Valley Raceway and consisted of one 50 km opener followed by two 100 km races with compulsory pitstops in each.

=== Entry list ===
There were 34 drivers entered into the event. It featured mixture of vehicle models - six AU Ford Falcon's, thirteen BA Falcon's, six VY Commodore's, and ten VX Commodore's.

Amidst dispute regarding charter contracts, Greg Ritter returned to 00 Motorsport after missing the previous round in Perth. With the teams situation becoming increasingly turbulent, this would ultimately mark the final round 00 Motorsport would compete in. The Racing Entitlement Contract was sold to Paul Weel Racing and the hardware in 2004 to WPS Racing.

David Thexton returned to the series after missing the previous round in Perth.

== Race report ==
=== Qualifying ===
Marcos Ambrose claimed provisional pole position over Mark Skaife over a tenth of a second. As often was the case, David Thexton failed to qualify for the event after posting a time three tenths shy of the 105% ruling.

| Pos | No | Name | Team | Vehicle | Time |
|---|---|---|---|---|---|
| 1 | 4 | (Australia) Marcos Ambrose | Stone Brothers Racing | Ford Falcon (BA) | 1:08.4384 |
| 2 | 1 | (Australia) Mark Skaife | Holden Racing Team | Holden Commodore (VY) | 1:08.5943 |
| 3 | 2 | (Australia) Todd Kelly | Holden Racing Team | Holden Commodore (VY) | 1:08.7783 |
| 4 | 9 | (Australia) Russell Ingall | Stone Brothers Racing | Ford Falcon (BA) | 1:08.8589 |
| 5 | 6 | (Australia) Craig Lowndes | Ford Performance Racing | Ford Falcon (BA) | 1:08.9166 |
| 6 | 888 | (Australia) John Bowe | Brad Jones Racing | Ford Falcon (BA) | 1:08.9372 |
| 7 | 34 | (Australia) Garth Tander | Garry Rogers Motorsport | Holden Commodore (VY) | 1:08.9503 |
| 8 | 51 | (New Zealand) Greg Murphy | John Kelly Racing | Holden Commodore (VX) | 1:08.9770 |
| 9 | 65 | (New Zealand) Paul Radisich | Briggs Motorsport | Ford Falcon (BA) | 1:08.9869 |
| 10 | 50 | (Australia) Jason Bright | Paul Weel Racing | Holden Commodore (VX) | 1:09.0214 |
| 11 | 31 | (Australia) Steven Ellery | Steven Ellery Racing | Ford Falcon (BA) | 1:09.0713 |
| 12 | 29 | (Australia) Paul Morris | Paul Morris Motorsport | Holden Commodore (VY) | 1:09.1142 |
| 13 | 44 | (New Zealand) Simon Wills | Team Dynamik | Holden Commodore (VY) | 1:09.1152 |
| 14 | 15 | (Australia) Rick Kelly | John Kelly Racing | Holden Commodore (VX) | 1:09.1239 |
| 15 | 45 | (New Zealand) Jason Richards | Team Dynamik | Holden Commodore (VY) | 1:09.1945 |
| 16 | 11 | (New Zealand) Steven Richards | Perkins Engineering | Holden Commodore (VX) | 1:09.2386 |
| 17 | 16 | (Australia) Paul Weel | Paul Weel Racing | Holden Commodore (VX) | 1:09.2458 |
| 18 | 19 | (Australia) David Besnard | Rod Nash Racing | Ford Falcon (AU) | 1:09.2701 |
| 19 | 21 | (Australia) Brad Jones | Brad Jones Racing | Ford Falcon (BA) | 1:09.2873 |
| 20 | 5 | (Australia) Glenn Seton | Ford Performance Racing | Ford Falcon (BA) | 1:09.2897 |
| 21 | 20 | (Australia) Jason Bargwanna | Larkham Motorsport | Ford Falcon (AU) | 1:09.4000 |
| 22 | 18 | (Brazil) Max Wilson | Dick Johnson Racing | Ford Falcon (BA) | 1:09.4329 |
| 23 | 17 | (Australia) Steven Johnson | Dick Johnson Racing | Ford Falcon (BA) | 1:09.4954 |
| 24 | 3 | (Australia) Cameron McConville | Lansvale Racing Team | Holden Commodore (VX) | 1:09.5310 |
| 25 | 10 | (Australia) Mark Larkham | Larkham Motorsport | Ford Falcon (AU) | 1:09.5447 |
| 26 | 8 | (Australia) Paul Dumbrell | Perkins Engineering | Holden Commodore (VX) | 1:09.5486 |
| 27 | 66 | (Australia) Dean Canto | Briggs Motorsport | Ford Falcon (BA) | 1:09.5559 |
| 28 | 00 | (Australia) Greg Ritter | 00 Motorsport | Ford Falcon (BA) | 1:09.5851 |
| 29 | 33 | (Australia) Jamie Whincup | Garry Rogers Motorsport | Holden Commodore (VX) | 1:09.6171 |
| 30 | 75 | (Australia) Anthony Tratt | Paul Little Racing | Ford Falcon (AU) | 1:09.6612 |
| 31 | 7 | (Australia) Rodney Forbes | 00 Motorsport | Ford Falcon (BA) | 1:09.7827 |
| 32 | 23 | (Australia) Mark Noske | Tony Noske Racing | Ford Falcon (AU) | 1:09.8788 |
| 33 | 021 | (New Zealand) Craig Baird | Team Kiwi Racing | Holden Commodore (VX) | 1:09.9314 |
105% time – 1:11.8603
| DNQ | 99 | (New Zealand) David Thexton | Thexton Motor Racing | Ford Falcon (AU) | 1:12.1864 |

=== Top ten shootout ===
| Pos | No | Name | Team | Vehicle | Time |
|---|---|---|---|---|---|
| 1 | 1 | (Australia) Mark Skaife | Holden Racing Team | Holden Commodore (VY) | 1:08.6282 |
| 2 | 4 | (Australia) Marcos Ambrose | Stone Brothers Racing | Ford Falcon (BA) | 1:08.6411 |
| 3 | 51 | (New Zealand) Greg Murphy | John Kelly Racing | Holden Commodore (VX) | 1:08.9303 |
| 4 | 50 | (Australia) Jason Bright | Paul Weel Racing | Holden Commodore (VX) | 1:09.0332 |
| 5 | 9 | (Australia) Russell Ingall | Stone Brothers Racing | Ford Falcon (BA) | 1:09.2540 |
| 6 | 34 | (Australia) Garth Tander | Garry Rogers Motorsport | Holden Commodore (VY) | 1:09.2924 |
| 7 | 6 | (Australia) Craig Lowndes | Ford Performance Racing | Ford Falcon (BA) | 1:09.3161 |
| 8 | 65 | (New Zealand) Paul Radisich | Briggs Motorsport | Ford Falcon (BA) | 1:09.5238 |
| 9 | 888 | (Australia) John Bowe | Brad Jones Racing | Ford Falcon (BA) | 1:09.6305 |
| 10 | 2 | (Australia) Todd Kelly | Holden Racing Team | Holden Commodore (VY) | 1:09.7555 |

=== Race 1 ===
| Pos | No | Name | Team | Vehicle | Laps | Time/Retired | Grid |
|---|---|---|---|---|---|---|---|
| 1 | 1 | (Australia) Mark Skaife | Holden Racing Team | Holden Commodore (VY) | 17 | 21:59.5111 | 1 |
| 2 | 4 | (Australia) Marcos Ambrose | Stone Brothers Racing | Ford Falcon (BA) | 17 | + 1.236 | 2 |
| 3 | 50 | (Australia) Jason Bright | Paul Weel Racing | Holden Commodore (VX) | 17 | + 8.582 | 4 |
| 4 | 34 | (Australia) Garth Tander | Garry Rogers Motorsport | Holden Commodore (VY) | 17 | + 9.794 | 6 |
| 5 | 65 | (New Zealand) Paul Radisich | Briggs Motorsport | Ford Falcon (BA) | 17 | + 10.984 | 8 |
| 6 | 51 | (New Zealand) Greg Murphy | John Kelly Racing | Holden Commodore (VX) | 17 | + 11.870 | 3 |
| 7 | 2 | (Australia) Todd Kelly | Holden Racing Team | Holden Commodore (VY) | 17 | + 12.418 | 10 |
| 8 | 31 | (Australia) Steven Ellery | Steven Ellery Racing | Ford Falcon (BA) | 17 | + 15.754 | 11 |
| 9 | 11 | (New Zealand) Steven Richards | Perkins Engineering | Holden Commodore (VX) | 17 | + 16.319 | 16 |
| 10 | 888 | (Australia) John Bowe | Brad Jones Racing | Ford Falcon (BA) | 17 | + 16.800 | 9 |
| 11 | 44 | (New Zealand) Simon Wills | Team Dynamik | Holden Commodore (VY) | 17 | + 17.148 | 13 |
| 12 | 16 | (Australia) Paul Weel | Paul Weel Racing | Holden Commodore (VX) | 17 | + 19.638 | 17 |
| 13 | 17 | (Australia) Steven Johnson | Dick Johnson Racing | Ford Falcon (BA) | 17 | + 20.493 | 23 |
| 14 | 15 | (Australia) Rick Kelly | John Kelly Racing | Holden Commodore (VX) | 17 | + 21.390 | 14 |
| 15 | 21 | (Australia) Brad Jones | Brad Jones Racing | Ford Falcon (BA) | 17 | + 22.382 | 19 |
| 16 | 45 | (New Zealand) Jason Richards | Team Dynamik | Holden Commodore (VY) | 17 | + 23.309 | 15 |
| 17 | 20 | (Australia) Jason Bargwanna | Larkham Motorsport | Ford Falcon (AU) | 17 | + 25.102 | 21 |
| 18 | 66 | (Australia) Dean Canto | Briggs Motorsport | Ford Falcon (BA) | 17 | + 26.088 | 27 |
| 19 | 23 | (Australia) Mark Noske | Tony Noske Racing | Ford Falcon (BA) | 17 | + 31.565 | 32 |
| 20 | 33 | (Australia) Jamie Whincup | Garry Rogers Motorsport | Holden Commodore (VX) | 17 | + 33.048 | 29 |
| 21 | 7 | (Australia) Rodney Forbes | 00 Motorsport | Ford Falcon (BA) | 17 | + 33.957 | 31 |
| 22 | 021 | (New Zealand) Craig Baird | Team Kiwi Racing | Holden Commodore (VX) | 17 | + 36.790 | 33 |
| 23 | 3 | (Australia) Cameron McConville | Lansvale Racing Team | Holden Commodore (VX) | 17 | + 37.245 | 24 |
| 24 | 19 | (Australia) David Besnard | Rod Nash Racing | Ford Falcon (AU) | 17 | + 43.941 | 18 |
| 25 | 75 | (Australia) Anthony Tratt | Paul Little Racing | Ford Falcon (AU) | 17 | + 46.992 | 30 |
| 26 | 10 | (Australia) Mark Larkham | Larkham Motorsport | Ford Falcon (AU) | 17 | + 47.312 | 25 |
| 27 | 8 | (Australia) Paul Dumbrell | Perkins Engineering | Holden Commodore (VX) | 17 | + 49.765 | 26 |
| 28 | 6 | (Australia) Craig Lowndes | Ford Performance Racing | Ford Falcon (BA) | 16 | + 1 lap | 7 |
| 29 | 00 | (Australia) Greg Ritter | 00 Motorsport | Ford Falcon (BA) | 16 | + 1 lap | 28 |
| Ret | 18 | (Brazil) Max Wilson | Dick Johnson Racing | Ford Falcon (BA) | 12 | Retired | 22 |
| Ret | 5 | (Australia) Glenn Seton | Ford Performance Racing | Ford Falcon (BA) | 10 | Retired | 20 |
| Ret | 29 | (Australia) Paul Morris | Paul Morris Motorsport | Holden Commodore (VY) | 3 | Retired | 12 |
| Ret | 9 | (Australia) Russell Ingall | Stone Brothers Racing | Ford Falcon (BA) | 0 | Retired | 5 |
Fastest Lap: Marcos Ambrose (Stone Brothers Racing) - 1:09.4432 on lap 9

=== Race 2 ===
| Pos | No | Name | Team | Vehicle | Laps | Time/Retired | Grid |
|---|---|---|---|---|---|---|---|
| 1 | 4 | (Australia) Marcos Ambrose | Stone Brothers Racing | Ford Falcon (BA) | 35 | 45:03.2352 | 2 |
| 2 | 1 | (Australia) Mark Skaife | Holden Racing Team | Holden Commodore (VY) | 35 | + 0.239 | 1 |
| 3 | 34 | (Australia) Garth Tander | Garry Rogers Motorsport | Holden Commodore (VY) | 35 | + 3.696 | 4 |
| 4 | 50 | (Australia) Jason Bright | Paul Weel Racing | Holden Commodore (VX) | 35 | + 6.122 | 3 |
| 5 | 51 | (New Zealand) Greg Murphy | John Kelly Racing | Holden Commodore (VX) | 35 | + 6.539 | 6 |
| 6 | 11 | (New Zealand) Steven Richards | Perkins Engineering | Holden Commodore (VX) | 35 | + 6.857 | 9 |
| 7 | 15 | (Australia) Rick Kelly | John Kelly Racing | Holden Commodore (VX) | 35 | + 7.202 | 14 |
| 8 | 65 | (New Zealand) Paul Radisich | Briggs Motorsport | Ford Falcon (BA) | 35 | + 7.642 | 5 |
| 9 | 44 | (New Zealand) Simon Wills | Team Dynamik | Holden Commodore (VY) | 35 | + 7.851 | 11 |
| 10 | 888 | (Australia) John Bowe | Brad Jones Racing | Ford Falcon (BA) | 35 | + 9.053 | 10 |
| 11 | 16 | (Australia) Paul Weel | Paul Weel Racing | Holden Commodore (VX) | 35 | + 10.307 | 12 |
| 12 | 66 | (Australia) Dean Canto | Briggs Motorsport | Ford Falcon (BA) | 35 | + 10.559 | 18 |
| 13 | 20 | (Australia) Jason Bargwanna | Larkham Motorsport | Ford Falcon (AU) | 35 | + 10.863 | 17 |
| 14 | 3 | (Australia) Cameron McConville | Lansvale Racing Team | Holden Commodore (VX) | 35 | + 11.575 | 23 |
| 15 | 31 | (Australia) Steven Ellery | Steven Ellery Racing | Ford Falcon (BA) | 35 | + 11.702 | 8 |
| 16 | 5 | (Australia) Glenn Seton | Ford Performance Racing | Ford Falcon (BA) | 35 | + 12.406 | 31 |
| 17 | 9 | (Australia) Russell Ingall | Stone Brothers Racing | Ford Falcon (BA) | 35 | + 12.551 | 33 |
| 18 | 19 | (Australia) David Besnard | Rod Nash Racing | Ford Falcon (AU) | 35 | + 13.004 | 24 |
| 19 | 021 | (New Zealand) Craig Baird | Team Kiwi Racing | Holden Commodore (VX) | 35 | + 14.433 | 22 |
| 20 | 18 | (Brazil) Max Wilson | Dick Johnson Racing | Ford Falcon (BA) | 35 | + 15.940 | 30 |
| 21 | 21 | (Australia) Brad Jones | Brad Jones Racing | Ford Falcon (BA) | 35 | + 16.113 | 15 |
| 22 | 8 | (Australia) Paul Dumbrell | Perkins Engineering | Holden Commodore (VX) | 35 | + 18.850 | 27 |
| 23 | 29 | (Australia) Paul Morris | Paul Morris Motorsport | Holden Commodore (VY) | 35 | + 19.291 | 32 |
| 24 | 2 | (Australia) Todd Kelly | Holden Racing Team | Holden Commodore (VY) | 34 | + 1 lap | 7 |
| 25 | 23 | (Australia) Mark Noske | Tony Noske Racing | Ford Falcon (BA) | 34 | + 1 lap | 19 |
| 26 | 00 | (Australia) Greg Ritter | 00 Motorsport | Ford Falcon (BA) | 34 | + 1 lap | 29 |
| 27 | 6 | (Australia) Craig Lowndes | Ford Performance Racing | Ford Falcon (BA) | 34 | + 1 lap | 28 |
| 28 | 7 | (Australia) Rodney Forbes | 00 Motorsport | Ford Falcon (BA) | 34 | + 1 lap | 21 |
| 29 | 17 | (Australia) Steven Johnson | Dick Johnson Racing | Ford Falcon (BA) | 34 | + 1 lap | 13 |
| 30 | 10 | (Australia) Mark Larkham | Larkham Motorsport | Ford Falcon (AU) | 33 | + 2 laps | 26 |
| 31 | 45 | (New Zealand) Jason Richards | Team Dynamik | Holden Commodore (VY) | 28 | + 7 laps | 16 |
| Ret | 33 | (Australia) Jamie Whincup | Garry Rogers Motorsport | Holden Commodore (VX) | 28 | Retired | 20 |
| Ret | 75 | (Australia) Anthony Tratt | Paul Little Racing | Ford Falcon (AU) | 24 | Retired | 25 |
Fastest Lap: Mark Skaife (Holden Racing Team) - 1:09.1488 on lap 6

=== Race 3 ===
| Pos | No | Name | Team | Vehicle | Laps | Time/Retired | Grid |
|---|---|---|---|---|---|---|---|
| 1 | 4 | (Australia) Marcos Ambrose | Stone Brothers Racing | Ford Falcon (BA) | 35 | 52:06.2762 | 1 |
| 2 | 51 | (New Zealand) Greg Murphy | John Kelly Racing | Holden Commodore (VX) | 35 | + 1.132 | 5 |
| 3 | 1 | (Australia) Mark Skaife | Holden Racing Team | Holden Commodore (VY) | 35 | + 1.385 | 2 |
| 4 | 50 | (Australia) Jason Bright | Paul Weel Racing | Holden Commodore (VX) | 35 | + 4.099 | 4 |
| 5 | 11 | (New Zealand) Steven Richards | Perkins Engineering | Holden Commodore (VX) | 35 | + 4.779 | 6 |
| 6 | 44 | (New Zealand) Simon Wills | Team Dynamik | Holden Commodore (VY) | 35 | + 5.831 | 9 |
| 7 | 888 | (Australia) John Bowe | Brad Jones Racing | Ford Falcon (BA) | 35 | + 6.500 | 28 |
| 8 | 9 | (Australia) Russell Ingall | Stone Brothers Racing | Ford Falcon (BA) | 35 | + 10.333 | 17 |
| 9 | 31 | (Australia) Steven Ellery | Steven Ellery Racing | Ford Falcon (BA) | 35 | + 17.972 | 15 |
| 10 | 21 | (Australia) Brad Jones | Brad Jones Racing | Ford Falcon (BA) | 35 | + 22.968 | 21 |
| 11 | 33 | (Australia) Jamie Whincup | Garry Rogers Motorsport | Holden Commodore (VX) | 35 | + 23.996 | 32 |
| 12 | 17 | (Australia) Steven Johnson | Dick Johnson Racing | Ford Falcon (BA) | 35 | + 24.581 | 29 |
| 13 | 16 | (Australia) Paul Weel | Paul Weel Racing | Holden Commodore (VX) | 35 | + 25.082 | 11 |
| 14 | 3 | (Australia) Cameron McConville | Lansvale Racing Team | Holden Commodore (VX) | 35 | + 26.108 | 14 |
| 15 | 6 | (Australia) Craig Lowndes | Ford Performance Racing | Ford Falcon (BA) | 35 | + 26.316 | 27 |
| 16 | 18 | (Brazil) Max Wilson | Dick Johnson Racing | Ford Falcon (BA) | 35 | + 26.494 | 20 |
| 17 | 5 | (Australia) Glenn Seton | Ford Performance Racing | Ford Falcon (BA) | 35 | + 26.914 | 16 |
| 18 | 15 | (Australia) Rick Kelly | John Kelly Racing | Holden Commodore (VX) | 35 | + 27.026 | 7 |
| 19 | 66 | (Australia) Dean Canto | Briggs Motorsport | Ford Falcon (BA) | 35 | + 27.375 | 12 |
| 20 | 20 | (Australia) Jason Bargwanna | Larkham Motorsport | Ford Falcon (AU) | 35 | + 29.943 | 13 |
| 21 | 10 | (Australia) Mark Larkham | Larkham Motorsport | Ford Falcon (AU) | 35 | + 31.767 | 30 |
| 22 | 00 | (Australia) Greg Ritter | 00 Motorsport | Ford Falcon (BA) | 35 | + 34.000 | 26 |
| 23 | 65 | (New Zealand) Paul Radisich | Briggs Motorsport | Ford Falcon (BA) | 35 | + 34.217 | 8 |
| 24 | 45 | (New Zealand) Jason Richards | Team Dynamik | Holden Commodore (VY) | 35 | + 34.696 | 31 |
| 25 | 34 | (Australia) Garth Tander | Garry Rogers Motorsport | Holden Commodore (VY) | 35 | + 34.996 | 3 |
| 26 | 7 | (Australia) Rodney Forbes | 00 Motorsport | Ford Falcon (BA) | 35 | + 36.098 | 28 |
| 27 | 021 | (New Zealand) Craig Baird | Team Kiwi Racing | Holden Commodore (VX) | 35 | + 57.079 | 19 |
| 28 | 19 | (Australia) David Besnard | Rod Nash Racing | Ford Falcon (AU) | 35 | + 58.044 | 18 |
| 29 | 23 | (Australia) Mark Noske | Tony Noske Racing | Ford Falcon (BA) | 33 | + 2 laps | 25 |
| 30 | 29 | (Australia) Paul Morris | Paul Morris Motorsport | Holden Commodore (VY) | 27 | + 8 laps | 23 |
| Ret | 8 | (Australia) Paul Dumbrell | Perkins Engineering | Holden Commodore (VX) | 18 | Retired | 22 |
| Ret | 2 | (Australia) Todd Kelly | Holden Racing Team | Holden Commodore (VY) | 0 | Accident | 24 |
| DNS | 75 | (Australia) Anthony Tratt | Paul Little Racing | Ford Falcon (AU) | | Did not start | |
Fastest Lap: Marcos Ambrose (Stone Brothers Racing) - 1:09.5896 on lap 11

== Championship standings ==
| Pos. | No | Driver | Team | Pts |
|---|---|---|---|---|
| 1 | 50 | (Australia) Jason Bright | Paul Weel Racing | 1027 |
| 2 | 11 | (New Zealand) Steven Richards | Perkins Engineering | 992 |
| 3 | 4 | (Australia) Marcos Ambrose | Stone Brothers Racing | 973 |
| 4 | 51 | (New Zealand) Greg Murphy | John Kelly Racing | 951 |
| 5 | 1 | (Australia) Mark Skaife | Holden Racing Team | 929 |
