= 2003 V8 Supercars Eastern Creek round =

Motor race

(New South Wales) 2003 Eastern Creek V8 Supercar round
Event Information
- Round 3 of 13 in the 2003 V8 Supercar Championship Series
- Date: 2-4 May 2003
- Location: Eastern Creek, New South Wales
- Venue: Eastern Creek Raceway
- Weather: Overcast

Results
Race 1
Distance	77 laps	300 km
Pole position	Marcos Ambrose; Stone Brothers Racing	1:31.5582
Winner	Marcos Ambrose; Stone Brothers Racing	2:07:14.6385
Round Results
First	Marcos Ambrose; Stone Brothers Racing	192 pts
Second	Craig Lowndes; Ford Performance Racing	186 pts
Third	Russell Ingall; Stone Brothers Racing	180 pts

The 2003 V8 Supercars Eastern Creek round was the third round of the 2003 V8 Supercar Championship Series. It was held on the weekend of 2 to 4 May at the Eastern Creek International Raceway in Sydney, New South Wales. The race was scheduled for 77 laps at a distance of 300 kilometers. To date, the race remains the longest single-driver race held in the V8 Supercar series.

Marcos Ambrose took his first round victory of the season in a dominant light-to-flag victory from pole position. Behind him, Craig Lowndes and Russell Ingall followed suit to make it a Ford trifecta on the podium. Mark Skaife was the best performing Holden driver of the weekend but was curtailed by an ill-timed strategic call for wet weather tyres as well as a split rim midway through the race which threw him out of contention and down the order.

Ambrose's victory marked the beginning of a six-round victory streak for Stone Brothers Racing as the team established itself as the new in-form team in the V8 Supercar series.

== Background ==
The event was held on the weekend of 2 to 4 May 2003. It was the 10th ATCC/V8 Supercar event to be held at Eastern Creek International Raceway and consisted of one 300 km race with two compulsory pitstops for fuel and tyres.

=== Entry list ===
There were 33 drivers entered into the event. It featured mixture of vehicle models - seven AU Ford Falcon's, twelve BA Falcon's, six VY Commodore's, and ten VX Commodore's.

00 Motorsport debuted a brand-new BA Falcon for Rodney Forbes at this round while an additional Paul Morris Motorsport VX Commodore driven by Wayne Wakefield was also entered.

== Race report ==
=== Qualifying ===
Pos	No	Driver	Team	Vehicle	Time
1	1	(Australia) Mark Skaife	Holden Racing Team	Holden Commodore (VY)	1:31.1923
2	4	(Australia) Marcos Ambrose	Stone Brothers Racing	Ford Falcon (BA)	1:31.7778
3	51	(New Zealand) Greg Murphy	Tom Walkinshaw Racing Australia	Holden Commodore (VX)	1:32.0096
4	9	(Australia) Russell Ingall	Stone Brothers Racing	Ford Falcon (BA)	1:32.0379
5	44	(New Zealand) Simon Wills	Team Dynamik	Holden Commodore (VY)	1:32.0963
6	2	(Australia) Todd Kelly	Holden Racing Team	Holden Commodore (VY)	1:32.0963
7	34	(Australia) Garth Tander	Garry Rogers Motorsport	Holden Commodore (VY)	1:32.1090
8	6	(Australia) Craig Lowndes	Ford Performance Racing	Ford Falcon (BA)	1:32.2189
9	50	(Australia) Jason Bright	Paul Weel Racing	Holden Commodore (VX)	1:32.2199
10	888	(Australia) John Bowe	Brad Jones Racing	Ford Falcon (BA)	1:32.2677
11	29	(Australia) Paul Morris	Paul Morris Motorsport	Holden Commodore (VY)	1:32.2883
12	45	(New Zealand) Jason Richards	Team Dynamik	Holden Commodore (VY)	1:32.3744
13	20	(Australia) Jason Bargwanna	Larkham Motorsport	Ford Falcon (AU)	1:32.3929
14	3	(Australia) Cameron McConville	Lansvale Racing Team	Holden Commodore (VX)	1:32.4259
15	31	(Australia) Steven Ellery	Steven Ellery Racing	Ford Falcon (BA)	1:32.4596
16	16	(Australia) Paul Weel	Paul Weel Racing	Holden Commodore (VX)	1:32.6236
17	11	(New Zealand) Steven Richards	Perkins Engineering	Holden Commodore (VX)	1:32.6511
18	65	(New Zealand) Paul Radisich	Briggs Motorsport	Ford Falcon (BA)	1:32.7707
19	21	(Australia) Brad Jones	Brad Jones Racing	Ford Falcon (BA)	1:32.7866
20	17	(Australia) Steven Johnson	Dick Johnson Racing	Ford Falcon (BA)	1:32.8189
21	15	(Australia) Rick Kelly	Tom Walkinshaw Racing Australia	Holden Commodore (VX)	1:32.8439
22	18	(Brazil) Max Wilson	Dick Johnson Racing	Ford Falcon (BA)	1:32.9583
23	5	(Australia) Glenn Seton	Ford Performance Racing	Ford Falcon (AU)	1:33.0147
24	00	(Australia) Greg Ritter	00 Motorsport	Ford Falcon (BA)	1:33.0661
25	10	(Australia) Mark Larkham	Larkham Motorsport	Ford Falcon (AU)	1:33.1228
26	8	(Australia) Paul Dumbrell	Perkins Engineering	Holden Commodore (VX)	1:33.2472
27	19	(Australia) David Besnard	Rod Nash Racing	Ford Falcon (AU)	1:33.2930
28	021	(New Zealand) Craig Baird	Team Kiwi Racing	Holden Commodore (VX)	1:33.3648
29	23	(Australia) Mark Noske	Noske Motorsport	Ford Falcon (AU)	1:33.5063
30	66	(Australia) Dean Canto	Briggs Motorsport	Ford Falcon (BA)	1:33.6058
31	7	(Australia) Rodney Forbes	00 Motorsport	Ford Falcon (BA)	1:33.6770
32	75	(Australia) Anthony Tratt	Paul Little Racing	Ford Falcon (AU)	1:33.8126
33	33	(Australia) Jamie Whincup	Garry Rogers Motorsport	Holden Commodore (VX)	1:33.9684
34	24	(Australia) Wayne Wakefield	Paul Morris Motorsport	Holden Commodore (VX)	1:34.6006
35	99	(New Zealand) David Thexton	Thexton Motor Racing	Ford Falcon (AU)	1:35.6729

=== Top ten shootout ===
Pos	No	Driver	Team	Vehicle	Time
1	4	(Australia) Marcos Ambrose	Stone Brothers Racing	Ford Falcon (BA)	1:31.5582
2	1	(Australia) Mark Skaife	Holden Racing Team	Holden Commodore (VY)	1:31.8212
3	2	(Australia) Todd Kelly	Holden Racing Team	Holden Commodore (VY)	1:31.9319
4	6	(Australia) Craig Lowndes	Ford Performance Racing	Ford Falcon (BA)	1:32.1608
5	51	(New Zealand) Greg Murphy	Tom Walkinshaw Racing Australia	Holden Commodore (VX)	1:32.3262
6	888	(Australia) John Bowe	Brad Jones Racing	Ford Falcon (BA)	1:32.4185
7	50	(Australia) Jason Bright	Paul Weel Racing	Holden Commodore (VX)	1:32.4540
8	34	(Australia) Garth Tander	Garry Rogers Motorsport	Holden Commodore (VY)	1:32.6361
9	44	(New Zealand) Simon Wills	Team Dynamik	Holden Commodore (VY)	1:32.7225
10	9	(Australia) Russell Ingall	Stone Brothers Racing	Ford Falcon (BA)	1:32.7282

=== Race ===
Before the race, a minute of silence was held in commemoration of New Zealand rally driver, Possum Bourne.

Ambrose won the holeshot into turn one while Skaife became swamped and lost two positions to Greg Murphy and Craig Lowndes. Later on the same lap, John Bowe was spun at the turn nine hairpin by Garth Tander. Bowe's day went from bad to worse when he was adjudged to have jumped the start and was issued a drive-through penalty. Teammate Brad Jones was also suffering from a slipping clutch which took a few laps before rectifying itself. Max Wilson also came to grief after receiving contact from Glenn Seton.

As early as lap four, rain was forecast to hit the circuit around lap seven or eight. This failed to materialise as Ambrose continued to streak ahead with a gap of five seconds over Murphy by the end of lap eight and appeared to be managing tyres better than any other driver on the circuit. Greg Ritter was spun by Mark Noske coming out of turn seven. It was the first of two incidents for Ritter during the race; the second being a high-speed spin at turn one which caused damage to his BA Falcon. At the beginning of lap 13, Lowndes passed Murphy at the entry of turn one for second place.

Ambrose made his first compulsory pitstop on lap 30 for fuel. Moments later, Skaife slowed dramatically as the Holden factory driver experienced issues with the front-right tyre owing to a split rim. Laps earlier, teammate Todd Kelly experienced similar issues and on lap 39, was forced into the pits again after sustaining damage to the front spoiler of his car. Upon discovering the extremity of the damage to the cooling of the car, Kelly was forced to retire from the race. Lowndes finally made his first pitstop at the end of lap 37 and relinquished the lead back to Ambrose. Ambrose would then pit for his second compulsory stop for tyres on lap 42. Jason Richards was issued a drive-through penalty for speeding in the pitlane. Laps later, he would be issued a second, suggesting there to be issues with his electronic speed limiter. Brad Jones retired on lap 47 owing to mechanical issues, pulling off to the side of the road at turn eight. The precarious placing of Jones' car led to the safety car being deploying.

The race resumed on lap 54 and drizzle began to descend upon the circuit. With his race already compromised, Skaife elected to gamble on wet weather tyres later in the lap. Two other drivers, Mark Noske and Glenn Seton, would also pit for wet weather tyres. Stone Brothers Racing conferred with Ambrose the possibility of pitting for wet weather tyres, but Ambrose elected against this. The rain appeared to be getting heavier, but it eventually began to ease and those out on wet weather tyres began to lose ground dramatically. All those drivers were forced to re-pit for slick tyres mere laps later. Bowe's turbulent race became even more so when he began to experience engine issues shortly after the restart. Anthony Tratt retired after the alternator on his car ruptured.

"We've really copped a hiding in the championship standings and this is a great way to bounce back. You know, we seem to have sorted the car out this weekend — look out the rest of the year."

— Marcos Ambrose on his victory

Murphy began to battle with tyres in the last dozen laps of the race. His struggle for grip led to Ingall passing him for fourth and began to chase after Lowndes, who in turn was hounding Bright for second place. With two laps remaining, Bright strayed wide at turn four and Lowndes slipped up the inside to take second place. On the final lap, Ingall managed to sneak by Bright for third at the same point of the circuit as Rodney Forbes blew his engine and began to dump oil all over the racing line. Up the front, Ambrose was unchallenged to the flag and took his first round victory of the season. Lowndes and Ingall rounded out the podium to make it a podium lockout for the Ford marque.

Pos	No	Driver	Team	Car	Laps	Time/Retired	Grid
1	4	(Australia) Marcos Ambrose	Stone Brothers Racing	Ford Falcon (BA)	77	02:07:14.6385	1
2	6	(Australia) Craig Lowndes	Ford Performance Racing	Ford Falcon (BA)	77	+ 25.869	4
3	9	(Australia) Russell Ingall	Stone Brothers Racing	Ford Falcon (BA)	77	+ 26.053	10
4	50	(Australia) Jason Bright	Paul Weel Racing	Holden Commodore (VX)	77	+ 26.517	7
5	51	(New Zealand) Greg Murphy	Tom Walkinshaw Racing Australia	Holden Commodore (VX)	77	+ 31.012	5
6	34	(Australia) Garth Tander	Garry Rogers Motorsport	Holden Commodore (VY)	77	+ 32.149	8
7	44	(New Zealand) Simon Wills	Team Dynamik	Holden Commodore (VY)	77	+ 34.881	9
8	11	(New Zealand) Steven Richards	Perkins Engineering	Holden Commodore (VX)	77	+ 36.691	17
9	15	(Australia) Rick Kelly	Tom Walkinshaw Racing Australia	Holden Commodore (VX)	77	+ 37.518	21
10	29	(Australia) Paul Morris	Paul Morris Motorsport	Holden Commodore (VY)	77	+ 40.961	11
11	16	(Australia) Paul Weel	Paul Weel Racing	Holden Commodore (VX)	77	+ 45.676	16
12	3	(Australia) Cameron McConville	Lansvale Racing Team	Holden Commodore (VX)	77	1:33.326	14
13	19	(Australia) David Besnard	Rod Nash Racing	Ford Falcon (AU)	76	+ 1 lap	27
14	20	(Australia) Jason Bargwanna	Larkham Motorsport	Ford Falcon (AU)	76	+ 1 lap	13
15	65	(New Zealand) Paul Radisich	Briggs Motorsport	Ford Falcon (BA)	76	+ 1 lap	18
16	18	(Brazil) Max Wilson	Dick Johnson Racing	Ford Falcon (BA)	76	+ 1 lap	22
17	17	(Australia) Steven Johnson	Dick Johnson Racing	Ford Falcon (BA)	76	+ 1 lap	20
18	10	(Australia) Mark Larkham	Larkham Motorsport	Ford Falcon (AU)	76	+ 1 lap	25
19	1	(Australia) Mark Skaife	Holden Racing Team	Holden Commodore (VY)	76	+ 1 lap	2
20	8	(Australia) Paul Dumbrell	Perkins Engineering	Holden Commodore (VX)	76	+ 1 lap	26
21	45	(New Zealand) Jason Richards	Team Dynamik	Holden Commodore (VY)	76	+ 1 lap	12
22	31	(Australia) Steven Ellery	Steven Ellery Racing	Ford Falcon (BA)	76	+ 1 lap	15
23	66	(Australia) Dean Canto	Briggs Motorsport	Ford Falcon (BA)	76	+ 1 lap	30
24	021	(New Zealand) Craig Baird	Team Kiwi Racing	Holden Commodore (VX)	76	+ 1 lap	28
25	7	(Australia) Rodney Forbes	00 Motorsport	Ford Falcon (BA)	75	+ 2 laps	31
26	5	(Australia) Glenn Seton	Ford Performance Racing	Ford Falcon (AU)	75	+ 2 laps	23
27	23	(Australia) Mark Noske	Noske Motorsport	Ford Falcon (AU)	75	+ 2 laps	29
28	00	(Australia) Greg Ritter	00 Motorsport	Ford Falcon (BA)	74	+ 3 laps	24
29	99	(New Zealand) David Thexton	Thexton Motor Racing	Ford Falcon (AU)	73	+ 4 laps	35
30	888	(Australia) John Bowe	Brad Jones Racing	Ford Falcon (BA)	66	+ 11 laps	6
NC	75	(Australia) Anthony Tratt	Paul Little Racing	Ford Falcon (AU)	52	Alternator	32
Ret	21	(Australia) Brad Jones	Brad Jones Racing	Ford Falcon (BA)	47	Mechanical	19
Ret	2	(Australia) Todd Kelly	Holden Racing Team	Holden Commodore (VY)	38	Radiator	3
Ret	33	(Australia) Jamie Whincup	Garry Rogers Motorsport	Holden Commodore (VX)	12	Mechanical	33
Fastest Lap: Marcos Ambrose (Stone Brothers Racing) - 1:32.9609 on lap 2

== Championship standings ==
Pos.	No	Driver	Team	Pts
1	50	(Australia) Jason Bright	Paul Weel Racing	531
2	11	(New Zealand) Steven Richards	Perkins Engineering	486
3	51	(New Zealand) Greg Murphy	Tom Walkinshaw Racing Australia	483
4	9	(Australia) Russell Ingall	Stone Brothers Racing	459
5	6	(Australia) Craig Lowndes	Ford Performance Racing	456
