= 2003 V8 Supercars Winton round =

Motor race

(Victoria (state)) 2003 V8 Supercars Winton round
Event Information
- Round 4 of 13 in the 2003 V8 Supercar Championship Series
- Date: 23–25 May 2003
- Location: Winton, Victoria, Australia
- Venue: Winton Motor Raceway
- Weather: Sunny

Results
Race 1
Distance	100 laps	300 km
Pole position	Marcos Ambrose; Stone Brothers Racing	1:23.7019
Winner	Marcos Ambrose; Stone Brothers Racing	2:28:50.5241
Round Results
First	Marcos Ambrose; Stone Brothers Racing	192 pts
Second	Jason Bright; Paul Weel Racing	186 pts
Third	Steven Richards; Perkins Engineering	180 pts

The 2003 V8 Supercars Winton round was the fourth round of the 2003 V8 Supercar Championship Series. It was held on the weekend of 23 to 25 May at the Winton Motor Raceway in Winton, Victoria. The race was scheduled for 100 laps at a distance of 300 kilometers.

Marcos Ambrose continued his form from the previous round at Eastern Creek by dominating the race from pole position to claim victory. An early safety car saw Stone Brothers Racing elect for an alternate strategy for Ambrose which ultimately paid off. The podium was rounded out by championship leader Jason Bright and Steven Richards.

A late-race incident between Craig Lowndes and Greg Murphy was a source of controversy with the latter being issued a drive-through penalty for his role in the incident. Most people disagreed with the stewards decision as it was viewed that Lowndes was out of control at the moment of impact and that Murphy had nowhere to go. The penalty invoked an impassioned and irate reaction from Murphy and from television commentator, Neil Crompton.

== Background ==
The event was held on the weekend of 23 to 25 May 2003. It was the 17th ATCC/V8 Supercar event to be held at Winton Motor Raceway and consisted of one 300 km race with two compulsory pitstops for fuel and tyres.

=== Entry list ===
There were 33 drivers entered into the event. It featured mixture of vehicle models - six AU Ford Falcon's, thirteen BA Falcon's, six VY Commodore's, and ten VX Commodore's.

Glenn Seton would be entered with a brand-new Ford Performance Racing-built BA Falcon.

== Race report ==
=== Qualifying ===
Pos	No	Driver	Team	Vehicle	Time
1	4	(Australia) Marcos Ambrose	Stone Brothers Racing	Ford Falcon (BA)	1:23.2604
2	50	(Australia) Jason Bright	Paul Weel Racing	Holden Commodore (VX)	1:23.2779
3	51	(New Zealand) Greg Murphy	Tom Walkinshaw Racing Australia	Holden Commodore (VX)	1:23.2921
4	1	(Australia) Mark Skaife	Holden Racing Team	Holden Commodore (VY)	1:23.3300
5	9	(Australia) Russell Ingall	Stone Brothers Racing	Ford Falcon (BA)	1:23.3563
6	11	(New Zealand) Steven Richards	Perkins Engineering	Holden Commodore (VX)	1:23.3976
7	29	(Australia) Paul Morris	Paul Morris Motorsport	Holden Commodore (VY)	1:23.4757
8	15	(Australia) Rick Kelly	Tom Walkinshaw Racing Australia	Holden Commodore (VX)	1:23.4822
9	2	(Australia) Todd Kelly	Holden Racing Team	Holden Commodore (VY)	1:23.5049
10	33	(Australia) Jamie Whincup	Garry Rogers Motorsport	Holden Commodore (VX)	1:23.6052
11	34	(Australia) Garth Tander	Garry Rogers Motorsport	Holden Commodore (VY)	1:23.6369
12	18	(Brazil) Max Wilson	Dick Johnson Racing	Ford Falcon (BA)	1:23.7261
13	44	(New Zealand) Simon Wills	Team Dynamik	Holden Commodore (VY)	1:23.8094
14	6	(Australia) Craig Lowndes	Ford Performance Racing	Ford Falcon (BA)	1:23.8265
15	888	(Australia) John Bowe	Brad Jones Racing	Ford Falcon (BA)	1:23.8572
16	16	(Australia) Paul Weel	Paul Weel Racing	Holden Commodore (VX)	1:23.9435
17	31	(Australia) Steven Ellery	Steven Ellery Racing	Ford Falcon (BA)	1:23.9696
18	5	(Australia) Glenn Seton	Ford Performance Racing	Ford Falcon (BA)	1:24.0128
19	8	(Australia) Paul Dumbrell	Perkins Engineering	Holden Commodore (VX)	1:24.0360
20	23	(Australia) Mark Noske	Noske Motorsport	Ford Falcon (AU)	1:24.0391
21	17	(Australia) Steven Johnson	Dick Johnson Racing	Ford Falcon (BA)	1:24.0411
22	45	(New Zealand) Jason Richards	Team Dynamik	Holden Commodore (VY)	1:24.0534
23	3	(Australia) Cameron McConville	Lansvale Racing Team	Holden Commodore (VX)	1:24.0717
24	21	(Australia) Brad Jones	Brad Jones Racing	Ford Falcon (BA)	1:24.0795
25	65	(New Zealand) Paul Radisich	Briggs Motorsport	Ford Falcon (BA)	1:24.1002
26	66	(Australia) Dean Canto	Briggs Motorsport	Ford Falcon (BA)	1:24.1374
27	20	(Australia) Jason Bargwanna	Larkham Motorsport	Ford Falcon (AU)	1:24.1873
28	24	(Australia) Wayne Wakefield	Paul Morris Motorsport	Holden Commodore (VX)	1:24.2342
29	75	(Australia) Anthony Tratt	Paul Little Racing	Ford Falcon (AU)	1:24.3986
30	19	(Australia) David Besnard	Rod Nash Racing	Ford Falcon (AU)	1:24.4202
31	021	(New Zealand) Craig Baird	Team Kiwi Racing	Holden Commodore (VX)	1:24.6298
32	10	(Australia) Mark Larkham	Larkham Motorsport	Ford Falcon (BA)	1:24.6952
33	00	(Australia) Greg Ritter	00 Motorsport	Ford Falcon (BA)	1:24.7812
34	7	(Australia) Rodney Forbes	00 Motorsport	Ford Falcon (BA)	1:25.1085
35	99	(New Zealand) David Thexton	Thexton Motor Racing	Ford Falcon (AU)	1:28.4395

=== Top ten shootout ===
Pos	No	Driver	Team	Vehicle	Time
1	4	(Australia) Marcos Ambrose	Stone Brothers Racing	Ford Falcon (BA)	1:23.7019
2	51	(New Zealand) Greg Murphy	Tom Walkinshaw Racing Australia	Holden Commodore (VX)	1:23.9869
3	50	(Australia) Jason Bright	Paul Weel Racing	Holden Commodore (VX)	1:24.0895
4	9	(Australia) Russell Ingall	Stone Brothers Racing	Ford Falcon (BA)	1:24.2763
5	1	(Australia) Mark Skaife	Holden Racing Team	Holden Commodore (VY)	1:24.3715
6	11	(New Zealand) Steven Richards	Perkins Engineering	Holden Commodore (VX)	1:24.5121
7	29	(Australia) Paul Morris	Paul Morris Motorsport	Holden Commodore (VY)	1:24.5940
8	15	(Australia) Rick Kelly	Tom Walkinshaw Racing Australia	Holden Commodore (VX)	1:24.6866
9	33	(Australia) Jamie Whincup	Garry Rogers Motorsport	Holden Commodore (VX)	1:24.7298
10	2	(Australia) Todd Kelly	Holden Racing Team	Holden Commodore (VY)	1:24.8847

=== Race ===
Pos	No	Driver	Team	Car	Laps	Time/Retired	Grid
1	4	(Australia) Marcos Ambrose	Stone Brothers Racing	Ford Falcon (BA)	100	02:28:50.5241	1
2	50	(Australia) Jason Bright	Paul Weel Racing	Holden Commodore (VX)	100	+ 3.950	3
3	11	(New Zealand) Steven Richards	Perkins Engineering	Holden Commodore (VX)	100	+ 5.537	6
4	9	(Australia) Russell Ingall	Stone Brothers Racing	Ford Falcon (BA)	100	+ 11.022	4
5	16	(Australia) Paul Weel	Paul Weel Racing	Holden Commodore (VX)	100	+ 18.144	16
6	1	(Australia) Mark Skaife	Holden Racing Team	Holden Commodore (VY)	100	+ 21.323	5
7	65	(New Zealand) Paul Radisich	Briggs Motorsport	Ford Falcon (BA)	100	+ 30.154	25
8	888	(Australia) John Bowe	Brad Jones Racing	Ford Falcon (BA)	100	+ 36.192	15
9	18	(Brazil) Max Wilson	Dick Johnson Racing	Ford Falcon (BA)	100	+ 37.465	12
10	6	(Australia) Craig Lowndes	Ford Performance Racing	Ford Falcon (BA)	100	+ 39.089	14
11	15	(Australia) Rick Kelly	Tom Walkinshaw Racing Australia	Holden Commodore (VX)	100	+ 40.185	8
12	5	(Australia) Glenn Seton	Ford Performance Racing	Ford Falcon (BA)	100	+ 40.564	18
13	20	(Australia) Jason Bargwanna	Larkham Motorsport	Ford Falcon (AU)	100	+ 45.217	27
14	51	(New Zealand) Greg Murphy	Tom Walkinshaw Racing Australia	Holden Commodore (VX)	100	+ 46.648	2
15	45	(New Zealand) Jason Richards	Team Dynamik	Holden Commodore (VY)	100	+ 1:07.115	22
16	75	(Australia) Anthony Tratt	Paul Little Racing	Ford Falcon (AU)	100	+ 1:11.629	29
17	3	(Australia) Cameron McConville	Lansvale Racing Team	Holden Commodore (VX)	100	+ 1:12.451	23
18	23	(Australia) Mark Noske	Noske Motorsport	Ford Falcon (AU)	99	+ 1 lap	20
19	17	(Australia) Steven Johnson	Dick Johnson Racing	Ford Falcon (BA)	99	+ 1 lap	21
20	00	(Australia) Greg Ritter	00 Motorsport	Ford Falcon (BA)	99	+ 1 lap	33
21	24	(Australia) Wayne Wakefield	Paul Morris Motorsport	Holden Commodore (VX)	99	+ 1 lap	28
22	10	(Australia) Mark Larkham	Larkham Motorsport	Ford Falcon (AU)	99	+ 1 lap	32
23	66	(Australia) Dean Canto	Briggs Motorsport	Ford Falcon (BA)	98	+ 2 laps	26
24	19	(Australia) David Besnard	Rod Nash Racing	Ford Falcon (AU)	96	+ 4 laps	30
25	31	(Australia) Steven Ellery	Steven Ellery Racing	Ford Falcon (BA)	93	+ 7 laps	17
26	21	(Australia) Brad Jones	Brad Jones Racing	Ford Falcon (BA)	85	+ 15 laps	24
Ret	34	(Australia) Garth Tander	Garry Rogers Motorsport	Holden Commodore (VY)	98	Retired	11
Ret	33	(Australia) Jamie Whincup	Garry Rogers Motorsport	Holden Commodore (VX)	85	Retired	9
Ret	44	(New Zealand) Simon Wills	Team Dynamik	Holden Commodore (VY)	49	Retired	13
Ret	29	(Australia) Paul Morris	Paul Morris Motorsport	Holden Commodore (VY)	40	Retired	7
Ret	8	(Australia) Paul Dumbrell	Perkins Engineering	Holden Commodore (VX)	3	Retired	19
DSQ	2	(Australia) Todd Kelly	Holden Racing Team	Holden Commodore (VY)	100	Disqualified	10
DSQ	021	(New Zealand) Craig Baird	Team Kiwi Racing	Holden Commodore (VX)		Disqualified	31
DSQ	7	(Australia) Rodney Forbes	00 Motorsport	Ford Falcon (BA)		Disqualified	34
DNQ	99	(New Zealand) David Thexton	Thexton Motor Racing	Ford Falcon (AU)		Did not qualify	
Fastest Lap: Marcos Ambrose (Stone Brothers Racing) - 1:24.0433 on lap 52

== Championship standings ==
Pos.	No	Driver	Team	Pts
1	50	(Australia) Jason Bright	Paul Weel Racing	717
2	11	(New Zealand) Steven Richards	Perkins Engineering	666
3	9	(Australia) Russell Ingall	Stone Brothers Racing	633
4	4	(Australia) Marcos Ambrose	Stone Brothers Racing	597
5	16	(Australia) Paul Weel	Paul Weel Racing	597
