= 2003 V8 Supercars Oran Park round =

Motor race

(New South Wales) 2003 V8 Supercars Oran Park round
Event Information
- Round 8 of 13 in the 2003 V8 Supercar Championship Series
- Date: 15–17 August 2003
- Location: Sydney, New South Wales
- Venue: Oran Park Raceway
- Weather: Sunny

Results
Race 1
Distance	111 laps	300 km
Pole position	Marcos Ambrose; Stone Brothers Racing	1:08.9291
Winner	Marcos Ambrose; Stone Brothers Racing	02:15:55.4043
Round Results
First	Marcos Ambrose; Stone Brothers Racing	192 pts
Second	Craig Lowndes; Ford Performance Racing	186 pts
Third	Mark Skaife; Holden Racing Team	180 pts

The 2003 V8 Supercars Oran Park round was the eighth round of the 2003 V8 Supercar Championship Series. It was held on the weekend of 15 to 17 August at the Oran Park Raceway in Sydney, New South Wales. The race was scheduled for 111 laps at a distance of 300 kilometers.

Marcos Ambrose dominated proceedings to take his fifth round win of the season and his seventh race win of the year. After blitzing the timing sheets in qualifying to take pole position, Ambrose remained unchallenged up the front despite a scare at the start of the race after contact with Paul Morris. Craig Lowndes secured his first podium since Eastern Creek and Mark Skaife rounded out the podium to help keep his championship hopes alive.

Ambrose's victory, coupled with Jason Bright's bad weekend, meant the Pritek-backed driver would become the new leader of the championship. It was a lead he would not relinquish en route to his maiden V8 Supercar championship title.

== Background ==
The event was held on the weekend of 15 to 17 August 2003. It was the 33rd ATCC/V8 Supercar event to be held at Oran Park Raceway and consisted of one 300 km race with two compulsory pitstops for fuel and tyres.

=== Entry list ===
There were 33 drivers entered into the event. It featured mixture of vehicle models - three AU Ford Falcon's, fourteen BA Falcon's, seven VY Commodore's, and eight VX Commodore's.

Greg Murphy would debut a brand-new John Kelly Racing-built VY Commodore for this round. Jason Bargwanna would also debut the BA Falcon for Larkham Motorsport and Anthony Tratt would receive the same treatment with Paul Little Racing.

This would be Briggs Motorsport's final outing in the V8 Supercar series before being bought out by Triple Eight Race Engineering in September.

David Thexton would withdraw from the weekend at the conclusion of practice three. He cited his own lack of pace compared to those around him as the reason for his departure.

== Race report ==
=== Qualifying ===
Pos	No	Driver	Team	Vehicle	Time
1	4	(Australia) Marcos Ambrose	Stone Brothers Racing	Ford Falcon (BA)	1:08.9278
2	51	(New Zealand) Greg Murphy	John Kelly Racing	Holden Commodore (VY)	1:08.9769
3	2	(Australia) Todd Kelly	Holden Racing Team	Holden Commodore (VY)	1:08.9905
4	1	(Australia) Mark Skaife	Holden Racing Team	Holden Commodore (VY)	1:09.0723
5	9	(Australia) Russell Ingall	Stone Brothers Racing	Ford Falcon (BA)	1:09.0875
6	6	(Australia) Craig Lowndes	Ford Performance Racing	Ford Falcon (BA)	1:09.2283
7	29	(Australia) Paul Morris	Paul Morris Motorsport	Holden Commodore (VY)	1:09.2662
8	45	(New Zealand) Jason Richards	Team Dynamik	Holden Commodore (VY)	1:09.3523
9	44	(New Zealand) Simon Wills	Team Dynamik	Holden Commodore (VY)	1:09.3561
10	31	(Australia) Steven Ellery	Steven Ellery Racing	Ford Falcon (BA)	1:09.3721
11	34	(Australia) Garth Tander	Garry Rogers Motorsport	Holden Commodore (VY)	1:09.4787
12	11	(New Zealand) Steven Richards	Perkins Engineering	Holden Commodore (VY)	1:09.5266
13	5	(Australia) Glenn Seton	Ford Performance Racing	Ford Falcon (BA)	1:09.5280
14	66	(Australia) Dean Canto	Briggs Motorsport	Ford Falcon (BA)	1:09.5539
15	888	(Australia) John Bowe	Brad Jones Racing	Ford Falcon (BA)	1:09.5895
16	3	(Australia) Cameron McConville	Lansvale Racing Team	Holden Commodore (VX)	1:09.5977
17	19	(Australia) David Besnard	Rod Nash Racing	Ford Falcon (BA)	1:09.6083
18	50	(Australia) Jason Bright	Paul Weel Racing	Holden Commodore (VX)	1:09.6247
19	16	(Australia) Paul Weel	Paul Weel Racing	Holden Commodore (VX)	1:09.6519
20	10	(Australia) Mark Larkham	Larkham Motorsport	Ford Falcon (AU)	1:09.6802
21	65	(New Zealand) Paul Radisich	Briggs Motorsport	Ford Falcon (BA)	1:09.7147
22	15	(Australia) Rick Kelly	John Kelly Racing	Holden Commodore (VX)	1:09.8155
23	20	(Australia) Jason Bargwanna	Larkham Motorsport	Ford Falcon (BA)	1:09.8965
24	021	(New Zealand) Craig Baird	Team Kiwi Racing	Holden Commodore (VX)	1:09.9652
25	21	(Australia) Brad Jones	Brad Jones Racing	Ford Falcon (BA)	1:09.9898
26	18	(Brazil) Max Wilson	Dick Johnson Racing	Ford Falcon (BA)	1:10.0054
27	23	(Australia) Mark Noske	Noske Motorsport	Ford Falcon (AU)	1:10.0450
28	24	(Australia) Wayne Wakefield	Paul Morris Motorsport	Holden Commodore (VX)	1:10.1017
29	17	(Australia) Steven Johnson	Dick Johnson Racing	Ford Falcon (BA)	1:10.1267
30	8	(Australia) Paul Dumbrell	Perkins Engineering	Holden Commodore (VX)	1:10.3671
31	33	(Australia) Jamie Whincup	Garry Rogers Motorsport	Holden Commodore (VX)	1:10.5297
32	75	(Australia) Anthony Tratt	Paul Little Racing	Ford Falcon (BA)	1:10.9479
	99	(New Zealand) David Thexton	Thexton Motor Racing	Ford Falcon (AU)	no time

=== Top ten shootout ===
Pos	No	Driver	Team	Vehicle	Time
1	4	(Australia) Marcos Ambrose	Stone Brothers Racing	Ford Falcon (BA)	1:08.9291
2	51	(New Zealand) Greg Murphy	John Kelly Racing	Holden Commodore (VY)	1:09.5545
3	29	(Australia) Paul Morris	Paul Morris Motorsport	Holden Commodore (VY)	1:09.6129
4	1	(Australia) Mark Skaife	Holden Racing Team	Holden Commodore (VY)	1:09.6749
5	45	(New Zealand) Jason Richards	Team Dynamik	Holden Commodore (VY)	1:09.7136
6	9	(Australia) Russell Ingall	Stone Brothers Racing	Ford Falcon (BA)	1:09.8222
7	31	(Australia) Steven Ellery	Steven Ellery Racing	Ford Falcon (BA)	1:09.9545
8	2	(Australia) Todd Kelly	Holden Racing Team	Holden Commodore (VY)	1:10.0581
9	6	(Australia) Craig Lowndes	Ford Performance Racing	Ford Falcon (BA)	1:10.1560
10	44	(New Zealand) Simon Wills	Team Dynamik	Holden Commodore (VY)	1:10.1764

=== Race ===
Pos	No	Driver	Team	Car	Laps	Time/Retired	Grid
1	4	(Australia) Marcos Ambrose	Stone Brothers Racing	Ford Falcon (BA)	111	02:15:55.4043	1
2	6	(Australia) Craig Lowndes	Ford Performance Racing	Ford Falcon (BA)	111	+ 12.454	9
3	1	(Australia) Mark Skaife	Holden Racing Team	Holden Commodore (VY)	111	+ 19.530	4
4	34	(Australia) Garth Tander	Garry Rogers Motorsport	Holden Commodore (VY)	111	+ 23.886	11
5	45	(New Zealand) Jason Richards	Team Dynamik	Holden Commodore (VY)	111	+ 27.881	5
6	2	(Australia) Todd Kelly	Holden Racing Team	Holden Commodore (VY)	110	+ 1 lap	8
7	888	(Australia) John Bowe	Brad Jones Racing	Ford Falcon (BA)	110	+ 1 lap	15
8	9	(Australia) Russell Ingall	Stone Brothers Racing	Ford Falcon (BA)	110	+ 1 lap	6
9	3	(Australia) Cameron McConville	Lansvale Racing Team	Holden Commodore (VX)	110	+ 1 lap	16
10	66	(Australia) Dean Canto	Briggs Motorsport	Ford Falcon (BA)	110	+ 1 lap	14
11	51	(New Zealand) Greg Murphy	John Kelly Racing	Holden Commodore (VY)	110	+ 1 lap	2
12	21	(Australia) Brad Jones	Brad Jones Racing	Ford Falcon (BA)	110	+ 1 lap	25
13	19	(Australia) David Besnard	Rod Nash Racing	Ford Falcon (BA)	110	+ 1 lap	17
14	23	(Australia) Mark Noske	Noske Motorsport	Ford Falcon (AU)	110	+ 1 lap	27
15	20	(Australia) Jason Bargwanna	Larkham Motorsport	Ford Falcon (BA)	110	+ 1 lap	23
16	16	(Australia) Paul Weel	Paul Weel Racing	Holden Commodore (VX)	110	+ 1 lap	19
17	8	(Australia) Paul Dumbrell	Perkins Engineering	Holden Commodore (VX)	110	+ 1 lap	30
18	10	(Australia) Mark Larkham	Larkham Motorsport	Ford Falcon (AU)	110	+ 1 lap	20
19	50	(Australia) Jason Bright	Paul Weel Racing	Holden Commodore (VX)	110	+ 1 lap	18
20	33	(Australia) Jamie Whincup	Garry Rogers Motorsport	Holden Commodore (VX)	110	+ 1 lap	31
21	31	(Australia) Steven Ellery	Steven Ellery Racing	Ford Falcon (BA)	97	+ 14 laps	7
22	021	(New Zealand) Craig Baird	Team Kiwi Racing	Holden Commodore (VX)	95	+ 16 laps	24
23	11	(New Zealand) Steven Richards	Perkins Engineering	Holden Commodore (VY)	89	+ 22 laps	12
24	15	(Australia) Rick Kelly	John Kelly Racing	Holden Commodore (VX)	85	+ 26 laps	22
Ret	29	(Australia) Paul Morris	Paul Morris Motorsport	Holden Commodore (VY)	109	Suspension	3
Ret	17	(Australia) Steven Johnson	Dick Johnson Racing	Ford Falcon (BA)	77	Retired	29
Ret	18	(Brazil) Max Wilson	Dick Johnson Racing	Ford Falcon (BA)	73	Engine	26
Ret	5	(Australia) Glenn Seton	Ford Performance Racing	Ford Falcon (BA)	35	Misfire	13
Ret	44	(New Zealand) Simon Wills	Team Dynamik	Holden Commodore (VY)	7	Accident damage	9
Ret	65	(New Zealand) Paul Radisich	Briggs Motorsport	Ford Falcon (BA)	5	Accident damage	21
DNS	75	(Australia) Anthony Tratt	Paul Little Racing	Ford Falcon (BA)	0	Did not start	32
DNS	24	(Australia) Wayne Wakefield	Paul Morris Motorsport	Holden Commodore (VX)	0	Did not start	28
WD	99	(New Zealand) David Thexton	Thexton Motor Racing	Ford Falcon (AU)		Withdrew	
Fastest Lap: Marcos Ambrose (Stone Brothers Racing) - 1:09.7922 on lap 2

== Championship standings ==
Pos.	No	Driver	Team	Pts
1	4	(Australia) Marcos Ambrose	Stone Brothers Racing	1351
2	50	(Australia) Jason Bright	Paul Weel Racing	1279
3	51	(New Zealand) Greg Murphy	John Kelly Racing	1233
4	9	(Australia) Russell Ingall	Stone Brothers Racing	1163
5	1	(Australia) Mark Skaife	Holden Racing Team	1145
