= 2003 Perth 300 =

Motor race

(Western Australia) 2003 Perth 300
Event Information
- Round 5 of 13 in the 2003 V8 Supercar Championship Series
- Date: 6–8 June 2003
- Location: Perth, Western Australia
- Venue: Barbagallo Raceway
- Weather: Sunny

Results
Race 1
Distance	42 laps	100 km
Pole position	Greg Murphy; John Kelly Racing	0:58.2022
Winner	Greg Murphy; John Kelly Racing	42:44.5643
Race 2
Distance	42 laps	100 km
Winner	Mark Skaife; Holden Racing Team	50:46.6743
Race 3
Distance	42 laps	100 km
Winner	Marcos Ambrose; Stone Brothers Racing	48:18.6105
Round Results
First	Marcos Ambrose; Stone Brothers Racing	186 pts
Second	Greg Murphy; John Kelly Racing	182 pts
Third	Steven Richards; Perkins Engineering	168 pts

The 2003 Perth 300 (known for sponsorship reasons as the 2003 VB 300) was the fifth round of the 2003 V8 Supercar Championship Series. It was held on the weekend of 6 to 8 June at the Barbagallo Raceway in Perth, Western Australia.

Greg Murphy kicked off the weekend strongly by claiming pole position in the shootout and winning the first race of the weekend. Following closely behind in second was Mark Skaife, who himself would strike back by claiming victory in the second race the following day. However, contact with a spinning Rodney Forbes stunted his charge in race three and a strong pit strategy by Stone Brothers Racing allowed Marcos Ambrose to hold off a determined charge by Todd Kelly to win race three. With his consistent run of podiums across the weekend, Ambrose was able to claim the overall round honours in the process with Murphy in second and Steven Richards in third.

Jason Bright still maintained the lead of the championship despite a difficult weekend.

== Background ==
The event was held on the weekend of 6 to 8 June 2003. It was the 27th ATCC/V8 Supercar event to be held at Barbagallo Raceway and consisted of three 100 km races with compulsory pitstops in each.

=== Entry list ===
There were 32 drivers entered into the event. It featured mixture of vehicle models - five AU Ford Falcon's, twelve BA Falcon's, six VY Commodore's, and ten VX Commodore's.

On the leadup to the event, Tom Walkinshaw Racing collapsed and the team was put up for sale by the administrator. The Holden Racing Team was purchased by Holden but as manufacturers were prohibited from owing teams, it was sold on to team driver, Mark Skaife. The second section of the team colloquially known as the K-Mart Racing Team was sold to John and Margaret Kelly and would henceforth be known as John Kelly Racing.

00 Motorsport would only field one car for the event, with Greg Ritter not competing and Rodney Forbes taking over Ritter's car. Wayne Wakefield of Paul Morris Motorsport would miss this, and the next round before returning to the championship at Ipswich. David Thexton would not enter this round.

== Race report ==
=== Qualifying ===
Pos	No	Driver	Team	Vehicle	Time
1	51	(New Zealand) Greg Murphy	John Kelly Racing	Holden Commodore (VX)	0:57.6298
2	1	(Australia) Mark Skaife	Holden Racing Team	Holden Commodore (VY)	0:57.6842
3	50	(Australia) Jason Bright	Paul Weel Racing	Holden Commodore (VX)	0:57.9195
4	6	(Australia) Craig Lowndes	Ford Performance Racing	Ford Falcon (BA)	0:58.0868
5	34	(Australia) Garth Tander	Garry Rogers Motorsport	Holden Commodore (VY)	0:58.1673
6	4	(Australia) Marcos Ambrose	Stone Brothers Racing	Ford Falcon (BA)	0:58.1826
7	44	(New Zealand) Simon Wills	Team Dynamik	Holden Commodore (VY)	0:58.2282
8	23	(Australia) Mark Noske	Tony Noske Racing	Ford Falcon (AU)	0:58.2504
9	5	(Australia) Glenn Seton	Ford Performance Racing	Ford Falcon (BA)	0:58.2863
10	11	(New Zealand) Steven Richards	Perkins Engineering	Holden Commodore (VX)	0:58.3002
11	2	(Australia) Todd Kelly	Holden Racing Team	Holden Commodore (VY)	0:58.3165
12	15	(Australia) Rick Kelly	John Kelly Racing	Holden Commodore (VX)	0:58.3384
13	10	(Australia) Mark Larkham	Larkham Motorsport	Ford Falcon (AU)	0:58.3555
14	21	(Australia) Brad Jones	Brad Jones Racing	Ford Falcon (BA)	0:58.3715
15	00	(Australia) Rodney Forbes	00 Motorsport	Ford Falcon (BA)	0:58.3929
16	9	(Australia) Russell Ingall	Stone Brothers Racing	Ford Falcon (BA)	0:58.3968
17	20	(Australia) Jason Bargwanna	Larkham Motorsport	Ford Falcon (AU)	0:58.4448
18	17	(Australia) Steven Johnson	Dick Johnson Racing	Ford Falcon (BA)	0:58.4713
19	18	(Brazil) Max Wilson	Dick Johnson Racing	Ford Falcon (BA)	0:58.5086
20	16	(Australia) Paul Weel	Paul Weel Racing	Holden Commodore (VX)	0:58.5445
21	19	(Australia) David Besnard	Rod Nash Racing	Ford Falcon (AU)	0:58.6276
22	888	(Australia) John Bowe	Brad Jones Racing	Ford Falcon (BA)	0:58.6488
23	45	(New Zealand) Jason Richards	Team Dynamik	Holden Commodore (VY)	0:58.6635
24	8	(Australia) Paul Dumbrell	Perkins Engineering	Holden Commodore (VX)	0:58.7738
25	31	(Australia) Steven Ellery	Steven Ellery Racing	Ford Falcon (BA)	0:58.8338
26	75	(Australia) Anthony Tratt	Paul Little Racing	Ford Falcon (AU)	0:58.8752
27	021	(New Zealand) Craig Baird	Team Kiwi Racing	Holden Commodore (VX)	0:58.8767
28	65	(New Zealand) Paul Radisich	Briggs Motorsport	Ford Falcon (BA)	0:58.9259
29	29	(Australia) Paul Morris	Paul Morris Motorsport	Holden Commodore (VY)	0:58.9721
30	3	(Australia) Cameron McConville	Lansvale Racing Team	Holden Commodore (VX)	0:59.0555
31	66	(Australia) Dean Canto	Briggs Motorsport	Ford Falcon (BA)	1:00.0231
32	33	(Australia) Jamie Whincup	Garry Rogers Motorsport	Holden Commodore (VX)	1:00.1985

=== Top ten shootout ===
Pos	No	Driver	Team	Vehicle	Time
1	51	(New Zealand) Greg Murphy	John Kelly Racing	Holden Commodore (VX)	0:58.2022
2	1	(Australia) Mark Skaife	Holden Racing Team	Holden Commodore (VY)	0:58.2430
3	4	(Australia) Marcos Ambrose	Stone Brothers Racing	Ford Falcon (BA)	0:58.3595
4	11	(New Zealand) Steven Richards	Perkins Engineering	Holden Commodore (VX)	0:58.4512
5	50	(Australia) Jason Bright	Paul Weel Racing	Holden Commodore (VX)	0:58.5710
6	44	(New Zealand) Simon Wills	Team Dynamik	Holden Commodore (VY)	0:58.7211
7	6	(Australia) Craig Lowndes	Ford Performance Racing	Ford Falcon (BA)	0:59.0811
8	34	(Australia) Garth Tander	Garry Rogers Motorsport	Holden Commodore (VY)	0:59.4291
9	5	(Australia) Glenn Seton	Ford Performance Racing	Ford Falcon (BA)	0:59.7203
10	23	(Australia) Mark Noske	Tony Noske Racing	Ford Falcon (AU)	0:59.7309

=== Race 1 ===
Pos	No	Driver	Team	Car	Laps	Time/Retired	Grid
1	51	(New Zealand) Greg Murphy	John Kelly Racing	Holden Commodore (VX)	42	42:44.5643	1
2	1	(Australia) Mark Skaife	Holden Racing Team	Holden Commodore (VY)	42	+ 0.206	2
3	4	(Australia) Marcos Ambrose	Stone Brothers Racing	Ford Falcon (BA)	42	+ 0.589	3
4	11	(New Zealand) Steven Richards	Perkins Engineering	Holden Commodore (VY)	42	+ 1.041	4
5	9	(Australia) Russell Ingall	Stone Brothers Racing	Ford Falcon (BA)	42	+ 6.424	16
6	6	(Australia) Craig Lowndes	Ford Performance Racing	Ford Falcon (BA)	42	+ 18.120	7
7	2	(Australia) Todd Kelly	Holden Racing Team	Holden Commodore (VY)	42	+ 25.596	11
8	44	(New Zealand) Simon Wills	Team Dynamik	Holden Commodore (VY)	42	+ 27.043	6
9	34	(Australia) Garth Tander	Garry Rogers Motorsport	Holden Commodore (VY)	42	+ 27.808	8
10	15	(Australia) Rick Kelly	John Kelly Racing	Holden Commodore (VX)	42	+ 30.355	12
11	31	(Australia) Steven Ellery	Steven Ellery Racing	Ford Falcon (BA)	42	+ 36.908	25
12	50	(Australia) Jason Bright	Paul Weel Racing	Holden Commodore (VX)	42	+ 40.072	5
13	16	(Australia) Paul Weel	Paul Weel Racing	Holden Commodore (VX)	42	+ 40.465	20
14	5	(Australia) Glenn Seton	Ford Performance Racing	Ford Falcon (BA)	42	+ 40.561	9
15	21	(Australia) Brad Jones	Brad Jones Racing	Ford Falcon (BA)	42	+ 41.207	14
16	65	(New Zealand) Paul Radisich	Briggs Motorsport	Ford Falcon (BA)	42	+ 41.529	28
17	23	(Australia) Mark Noske	Tony Noske Racing	Ford Falcon (AU)	42	+ 42.410	10
18	29	(Australia) Paul Morris	Paul Morris Motorsport	Holden Commodore (VY)	42	+ 42.981	29
19	8	(Australia) Paul Dumbrell	Perkins Engineering	Holden Commodore (VX)	42	+ 44.952	24
20	19	(Australia) David Besnard	Rod Nash Racing	Ford Falcon (BA)	42	+ 47.725	21
21	3	(Australia) Cameron McConville	Lansvale Racing Team	Holden Commodore (VX)	42	+ 48.178	30
22	33	(Australia) Jamie Whincup	Garry Rogers Motorsport	Holden Commodore (VX)	42	+ 48.948	32
23	00	(Australia) Rodney Forbes	00 Motorsport	Ford Falcon (BA)	42	+ 49.218	15
24	18	(Brazil) Max Wilson	Dick Johnson Racing	Ford Falcon (BA)	42	+ 54.610	19
25	021	(New Zealand) Craig Baird	Team Kiwi Racing	Holden Commodore (VX)	42	+ 55.360	27
26	10	(Australia) Mark Larkham	Larkham Motorsport	Ford Falcon (AU)	42	+ 1:00.221	13
27	66	(Australia) Dean Canto	Briggs Motorsport	Ford Falcon (BA)	42	+ 1:00.988	31
28	45	(New Zealand) Jason Richards	Team Dynamik	Holden Commodore (VY)	41	+ 1 lap	23
29	17	(Australia) Steven Johnson	Dick Johnson Racing	Ford Falcon (BA)	41	+ 1 lap	18
30	888	(Australia) John Bowe	Brad Jones Racing	Ford Falcon (BA)	40	+ 2 laps	22
31	75	(Australia) Anthony Tratt	Paul Little Racing	Ford Falcon (AU)	40	+ 2 laps	26
Ret	20	(Australia) Jason Bargwanna	Larkham Motorsport	Ford Falcon (AU)	28	Engine	17
Fastest Lap: Mark Skaife (Holden Racing Team) - 59.0161 on lap 2

=== Race 2 ===
Pos	No	Driver	Team	Car	Laps	Time/Retired	Grid
1	1	(Australia) Mark Skaife	Holden Racing Team	Holden Commodore (VY)	42	50:46.6743	2
2	4	(Australia) Marcos Ambrose	Stone Brothers Racing	Ford Falcon (BA)	42	+ 1.607	3
3	11	(New Zealand) Steven Richards	Perkins Engineering	Holden Commodore (VY)	42	+ 2.767	4
4	51	(New Zealand) Greg Murphy	John Kelly Racing	Holden Commodore (VX)	42	+ 3.513	1
5	34	(Australia) Garth Tander	Garry Rogers Motorsport	Holden Commodore (VY)	42	+ 4.161	9
6	16	(Australia) Paul Weel	Paul Weel Racing	Holden Commodore (VX)	42	+ 6.278	13
7	2	(Australia) Todd Kelly	Holden Racing Team	Holden Commodore (VY)	42	+ 6.764	7
8	3	(Australia) Cameron McConville	Lansvale Racing Team	Holden Commodore (VX)	42	+ 7.350	21
9	15	(Australia) Rick Kelly	John Kelly Racing	Holden Commodore (VX)	42	+ 7.904	10
10	50	(Australia) Jason Bright	Paul Weel Racing	Holden Commodore (VX)	42	+ 10.017	12
11	888	(Australia) John Bowe	Brad Jones Racing	Ford Falcon (BA)	42	+ 10.252	30
12	45	(New Zealand) Jason Richards	Team Dynamik	Holden Commodore (VY)	42	+ 10.718	28
13	65	(New Zealand) Paul Radisich	Briggs Motorsport	Ford Falcon (BA)	42	+ 10.950	16
14	21	(Australia) Brad Jones	Brad Jones Racing	Ford Falcon (BA)	42	+ 11.222	15
15	5	(Australia) Glenn Seton	Ford Performance Racing	Ford Falcon (BA)	42	+ 11.690	14
16	31	(Australia) Steven Ellery	Steven Ellery Racing	Ford Falcon (BA)	42	+ 12.739	11
17	18	(Brazil) Max Wilson	Dick Johnson Racing	Ford Falcon (BA)	42	+ 13.804	24
18	17	(Australia) Steven Johnson	Dick Johnson Racing	Ford Falcon (BA)	42	+ 14.050	29
19	23	(Australia) Mark Noske	Tony Noske Racing	Ford Falcon (AU)	42	+ 14.355	17
20	19	(Australia) David Besnard	Rod Nash Racing	Ford Falcon (BA)	42	+ 14.612	20
21	75	(Australia) Anthony Tratt	Paul Little Racing	Ford Falcon (AU)	42	+ 14.847	31
22	66	(Australia) Dean Canto	Briggs Motorsport	Ford Falcon (BA)	42	+ 15.492	27
23	10	(Australia) Mark Larkham	Larkham Motorsport	Ford Falcon (AU)	42	+ 15.910	26
24	021	(New Zealand) Craig Baird	Team Kiwi Racing	Holden Commodore (VX)	42	+ 17.576	25
25	00	(Australia) Rodney Forbes	00 Motorsport	Ford Falcon (BA)	42	+ 19.181	23
26	8	(Australia) Paul Dumbrell	Perkins Engineering	Holden Commodore (VX)	37	+ 5 laps	19
27	9	(Australia) Russell Ingall	Stone Brothers Racing	Ford Falcon (BA)	34	+ 8 laps	5
Ret	44	(New Zealand) Simon Wills	Team Dynamik	Holden Commodore (VY)	39	Accident	8
Ret	6	(Australia) Craig Lowndes	Ford Performance Racing	Ford Falcon (BA)	39	Accident	6
Ret	33	(Australia) Jamie Whincup	Garry Rogers Motorsport	Holden Commodore (VX)	36	Mechanical	22
Ret	29	(Australia) Paul Morris	Paul Morris Motorsport	Holden Commodore (VY)	34	Spun off	18
DNS	20	(Australia) Jason Bargwanna	Larkham Motorsport	Ford Falcon (AU)		Did not start	
Fastest Lap: Mark Skaife (Holden Racing Team) - 58.3547 on lap 3

=== Race 3 ===
Pos	No	Driver	Team	Car	Laps	Time/Retired	Grid
1	4	(Australia) Marcos Ambrose	Stone Brothers Racing	Ford Falcon (BA)	42	48:18.6105	2
2	2	(Australia) Todd Kelly	Holden Racing Team	Holden Commodore (VY)	42	+ 0.407	7
3	51	(New Zealand) Greg Murphy	John Kelly Racing	Holden Commodore (VX)	42	+ 1.066	4
4	15	(Australia) Rick Kelly	John Kelly Racing	Holden Commodore (VX)	42	+ 1.936	9
5	34	(Australia) Garth Tander	Garry Rogers Motorsport	Holden Commodore (VY)	42	+ 2.962	5
6	65	(New Zealand) Paul Radisich	Briggs Motorsport	Ford Falcon (BA)	42	+ 3.367	13
7	16	(Australia) Paul Weel	Paul Weel Racing	Holden Commodore (VX)	42	+ 4.099	6
8	11	(New Zealand) Steven Richards	Perkins Engineering	Holden Commodore (VY)	42	+ 4.462	3
9	3	(Australia) Cameron McConville	Lansvale Racing Team	Holden Commodore (VX)	42	+ 4.610	8
10	50	(Australia) Jason Bright	Paul Weel Racing	Holden Commodore (VX)	42	+ 7.036	10
11	888	(Australia) John Bowe	Brad Jones Racing	Ford Falcon (BA)	42	+ 7.680	11
12	17	(Australia) Steven Johnson	Dick Johnson Racing	Ford Falcon (BA)	42	+ 8.014	18
13	18	(Brazil) Max Wilson	Dick Johnson Racing	Ford Falcon (BA)	42	+ 8.605	17
14	9	(Australia) Russell Ingall	Stone Brothers Racing	Ford Falcon (BA)	42	+ 9.100	27
15	21	(Australia) Brad Jones	Brad Jones Racing	Ford Falcon (BA)	42	+ 10.145	14
16	44	(New Zealand) Simon Wills	Team Dynamik	Holden Commodore (VY)	42	+ 10.526	28
17	6	(Australia) Craig Lowndes	Ford Performance Racing	Ford Falcon (BA)	42	+ 10.752	29
18	5	(Australia) Glenn Seton	Ford Performance Racing	Ford Falcon (BA)	42	+ 11.203	15
19	23	(Australia) Mark Noske	Tony Noske Racing	Ford Falcon (AU)	42	+ 12.307	19
20	29	(Australia) Paul Morris	Paul Morris Motorsport	Holden Commodore (VY)	42	+ 12.741	31
21	33	(Australia) Jamie Whincup	Garry Rogers Motorsport	Holden Commodore (VX)	42	+ 13.095	30
22	021	(New Zealand) Craig Baird	Team Kiwi Racing	Holden Commodore (VX)	42	+ 13.377	24
23	1	(Australia) Mark Skaife	Holden Racing Team	Holden Commodore (VY)	42	+ 14.174	1
24	75	(Australia) Anthony Tratt	Paul Little Racing	Ford Falcon (AU)	42	+ 14.453	21
25	45	(New Zealand) Jason Richards	Team Dynamik	Holden Commodore (VY)	42	+ 24.186	12
26	66	(Australia) Dean Canto	Briggs Motorsport	Ford Falcon (BA)	41	+ 1 lap	22
27	10	(Australia) Mark Larkham	Larkham Motorsport	Ford Falcon (AU)	41	+ 1 lap	23
28	00	(Australia) Rodney Forbes	00 Motorsport	Ford Falcon (BA)	40	+ 2 laps	25
Ret	31	(Australia) Steven Ellery	Steven Ellery Racing	Ford Falcon (BA)	38	Accident	16
Ret	19	(Australia) David Besnard	Rod Nash Racing	Ford Falcon (BA)	37	Retired	20
Ret	8	(Australia) Paul Dumbrell	Perkins Engineering	Holden Commodore (VX)	30	Retired	26
DNS	20	(Australia) Jason Bargwanna	Larkham Motorsport	Ford Falcon (AU)		Did not start	
Fastest Lap: Todd Kelly (Holden Racing Team) - 59.0186 on lap 6

== Championship standings ==
Pos.	No	Driver	Team	Pts
1	50	(Australia) Jason Bright	Paul Weel Racing	851
2	11	(New Zealand) Steven Richards	Perkins Engineering	834
3	4	(Australia) Marcos Ambrose	Stone Brothers Racing	783
4	51	(New Zealand) Greg Murphy	John Kelly Racing	779
5	1	(Australia) Mark Skaife	Holden Racing Team	743
