= 2003 Ipswich 300 =

Motor race

(Queensland) 2003 V8 Supercars Ipswich round
Event Information
- Round 7 of 13 in the 2003 V8 Supercar Championship Series
- Date: 18–20 July 2003
- Location: Ipswich, Queensland
- Venue: Queensland Raceway
- Weather: Sunny

Results
Race 1
Distance	96 laps	300 km
Pole position	Marcos Ambrose; Stone Brothers Racing	1:10.7717
Winner	Russell Ingall; Stone Brothers Racing	01:57:26.4960
Round Results
First	Russell Ingall; Stone Brothers Racing	192 pts
Second	Marcos Ambrose; Stone Brothers Racing	186 pts
Third	Todd Kelly; Holden Racing Team	180 pts

The 2003 Ipswich 300 (known for naming rights reasons as the 2003 BigPond 300) was the seventh round of the 2003 V8 Supercar Championship Series. It was held on the weekend of 18 to 20 July at the Queensland Raceway in Ipswich, Queensland. The race was scheduled for 96 laps at a distance of 300 kilometers.

Russell Ingall continued Stone Brothers Racing's extraordinary run of form by securing his first win for the team and for the Ford marque. Teammate Marcos Ambrose had been the pacesetter throughout the weekend. However, contact in the pitlane with Steven Ellery led to the Tasmanian being issued a drive-through penalty, stunting his campaign. Mark Skaife had taken the lead of the race early on but suffered an engine failure toward the end.

== Background ==
The event was held on the weekend of 18 to 20 July 2003. It was the third V8 Supercar event to be held at Queensland Raceway in the sprint format and consisted of one 300 km race with two compulsory pitstops for fuel and tyres. This was the first solo driver event at the venue since 2000. From 2000 to 2002, the circuit had played host to the Queensland 500.

=== Entry list ===
There were 33 drivers entered into the event. It featured mixture of vehicle models - four AU Ford Falcon's, thirteen BA Falcon's, six VY Commodore's, and nine VX Commodore's.

Rod Nash Racing debuted their brand-new BA Falcon to be driven by David Besnard for this round.

Wayne Wakefield returned to the championship, driving a VX Commodore fielded by Paul Morris Motorsport.

== Race report ==
=== Qualifying ===
Pos	No	Driver	Team	Vehicle	Time
1	1	(Australia) Mark Skaife	Holden Racing Team	Holden Commodore (VY)	1:10.3723
2	4	(Australia) Marcos Ambrose	Stone Brothers Racing	Ford Falcon (BA)	1:10.4488
3	2	(Australia) Todd Kelly	Holden Racing Team	Holden Commodore (VY)	1:10.6835
4	44	(New Zealand) Simon Wills	Team Dynamik	Holden Commodore (VY)	1:10.8127
5	9	(Australia) Russell Ingall	Stone Brothers Racing	Ford Falcon (BA)	1:10.8798
6	29	(Australia) Paul Morris	Paul Morris Motorsport	Holden Commodore (VY)	1:10.8878
7	50	(Australia) Jason Bright	Paul Weel Racing	Holden Commodore (VX)	1:10.8959
8	65	(New Zealand) Paul Radisich	Briggs Motorsport	Ford Falcon (BA)	1:10.9403
9	888	(Australia) John Bowe	Brad Jones Racing	Ford Falcon (BA)	1:10.9416
10	51	(New Zealand) Greg Murphy	John Kelly Racing	Holden Commodore (VX)	1:10.9576
11	6	(Australia) Craig Lowndes	Ford Performance Racing	Ford Falcon (BA)	1:10.9649
12	5	(Australia) Glenn Seton	Ford Performance Racing	Ford Falcon (BA)	1:11.0561
13	66	(Australia) Dean Canto	Briggs Motorsport	Ford Falcon (BA)	1:11.0955
14	19	(Australia) David Besnard	Rod Nash Racing	Ford Falcon (BA)	1:11.1909
15	17	(Australia) Steven Johnson	Dick Johnson Racing	Ford Falcon (BA)	1:11.2004
16	15	(Australia) Rick Kelly	John Kelly Racing	Holden Commodore (VX)	1:11.2303
17	31	(Australia) Steven Ellery	Steven Ellery Racing	Ford Falcon (BA)	1:11.2406
18	18	(Brazil) Max Wilson	Dick Johnson Racing	Ford Falcon (BA)	1:11.2913
19	34	(Australia) Garth Tander	Garry Rogers Motorsport	Holden Commodore (VY)	1:11.3259
20	10	(Australia) Mark Larkham	Larkham Motorsport	Ford Falcon (AU)	1:11.3759
21	20	(Australia) Jason Bargwanna	Larkham Motorsport	Ford Falcon (AU)	1:11.4315
22	021	(New Zealand) Craig Baird	Team Kiwi Racing	Holden Commodore (VX)	1:11.4820
23	45	(New Zealand) Jason Richards	Team Dynamik	Holden Commodore (VY)	1:11.4866
24	16	(Australia) Paul Weel	Paul Weel Racing	Holden Commodore (VX)	1:11.5285
25	3	(Australia) Cameron McConville	Lansvale Racing Team	Holden Commodore (VX)	1:11.5520
26	33	(Australia) Jamie Whincup	Garry Rogers Motorsport	Holden Commodore (VX)	1:11.6622
27	21	(Australia) Brad Jones	Brad Jones Racing	Ford Falcon (BA)	1:11.6848
28	8	(Australia) Paul Dumbrell	Perkins Engineering	Holden Commodore (VX)	1:11.7064
29	11	(New Zealand) Steven Richards	Perkins Engineering	Holden Commodore (VY)	1:11.7666
30	23	(Australia) Mark Noske	Noske Motorsport	Ford Falcon (AU)	1:11.8117
31	75	(Australia) Anthony Tratt	Paul Little Racing	Ford Falcon (BA)	1:12.2909
32	24	(Australia) Wayne Wakefield	Paul Morris Motorsport	Holden Commodore (VX)	1:12.4056
33	99	(New Zealand) David Thexton	Thexton Motor Racing	Ford Falcon (AU)	1:13.2566

=== Top ten shootout ===
Pos	No	Driver	Team	Vehicle	Time
1	4	(Australia) Marcos Ambrose	Stone Brothers Racing	Ford Falcon (BA)	1:10.7717
2	1	(Australia) Mark Skaife	Holden Racing Team	Holden Commodore (VY)	1:10.8862
3	29	(Australia) Paul Morris	Paul Morris Motorsport	Holden Commodore (VY)	1:11.0100
4	9	(Australia) Russell Ingall	Stone Brothers Racing	Ford Falcon (BA)	1:11.1110
5	44	(New Zealand) Simon Wills	Team Dynamik	Holden Commodore (VY)	1:11.1262
6	50	(Australia) Jason Bright	Paul Weel Racing	Holden Commodore (VX)	1:11.1783
7	51	(New Zealand) Greg Murphy	John Kelly Racing	Holden Commodore (VX)	1:11.3666
8	2	(Australia) Todd Kelly	Holden Racing Team	Holden Commodore (VY)	1:11.4180
9	888	(Australia) John Bowe	Brad Jones Racing	Ford Falcon (BA)	1:11.5287
10	65	(New Zealand) Paul Radisich	Briggs Motorsport	Ford Falcon (BA)	1:11.5462

=== Race ===
Pos	No	Driver	Team	Car	Laps	Time/Retired	Grid
1	9	(Australia) Russell Ingall	Stone Brothers Racing	Ford Falcon (BA)	96	01:57:26.4960	4
2	4	(Australia) Marcos Ambrose	Stone Brothers Racing	Ford Falcon (BA)	96	+ 3.279	1
3	2	(Australia) Todd Kelly	Holden Racing Team	Holden Commodore (VY)	96	+ 18.369	8
4	29	(Australia) Paul Morris	Paul Morris Motorsport	Holden Commodore (VY)	96	+ 24.099	3
5	50	(Australia) Jason Bright	Paul Weel Racing	Holden Commodore (VX)	96	+ 26.724	6
6	6	(Australia) Craig Lowndes	Ford Performance Racing	Ford Falcon (BA)	96	+ 29.468	11
7	888	(Australia) John Bowe	Brad Jones Racing	Ford Falcon (BA)	96	+ 34.505	9
8	51	(New Zealand) Greg Murphy	John Kelly Racing	Holden Commodore (VX)	96	+ 42.777	7
9	15	(Australia) Rick Kelly	John Kelly Racing	Holden Commodore (VX)	96	+ 51.899	16
10	16	(Australia) Paul Weel	Paul Weel Racing	Holden Commodore (VX)	96	+ 1:02.025	24
11	19	(Australia) David Besnard	Rod Nash Racing	Ford Falcon (BA)	96	+ 1:02.908	14
12	17	(Australia) Steven Johnson	Dick Johnson Racing	Ford Falcon (BA)	95	+ 1 lap	15
13	8	(Australia) Paul Dumbrell	Perkins Engineering	Holden Commodore (VX)	95	+ 1 lap	28
14	31	(Australia) Steven Ellery	Steven Ellery Racing	Ford Falcon (BA)	95	+ 1 lap	17
15	3	(Australia) Cameron McConville	Lansvale Racing Team	Holden Commodore (VX)	95	+ 1 lap	25
16	33	(Australia) Jamie Whincup	Garry Rogers Motorsport	Holden Commodore (VX)	95	+ 1 lap	26
17	20	(Australia) Jason Bargwanna	Larkham Motorsport	Ford Falcon (AU)	95	+ 1 lap	21
18	021	(New Zealand) Craig Baird	Team Kiwi Racing	Holden Commodore (VX)	94	+ 2 laps	22
19	75	(Australia) Anthony Tratt	Paul Little Racing	Ford Falcon (AU)	94	+ 2 laps	31
20	45	(New Zealand) Jason Richards	Team Dynamik	Holden Commodore (VY)	93	+ 3 laps	23
21	23	(Australia) Mark Noske	Noske Motorsport	Ford Falcon (AU)	92	+ 4 laps	30
22	66	(Australia) Dean Canto	Briggs Motorsport	Ford Falcon (BA)	92	+ 4 laps	13
23	99	(New Zealand) David Thexton	Thexton Motor Racing	Ford Falcon (AU)	92	+ 4 laps	32
24	18	(Brazil) Max Wilson	Dick Johnson Racing	Ford Falcon (BA)	90	+ 6 laps	18
25	34	(Australia) Garth Tander	Garry Rogers Motorsport	Holden Commodore (VY)	78	+ 18 laps	19
Ret	65	(New Zealand) Paul Radisich	Briggs Motorsport	Ford Falcon (BA)	95	Retired	10
Ret	1	(Australia) Mark Skaife	Holden Racing Team	Holden Commodore (VY)	88	Engine	2
Ret	10	(Australia) Mark Larkham	Larkham Motorsport	Ford Falcon (AU)	88	Spun off	20
Ret	44	(New Zealand) Simon Wills	Team Dynamik	Holden Commodore (VY)	51	Retired	5
Ret	11	(New Zealand) Steven Richards	Perkins Engineering	Holden Commodore (VY)	41	Retired	29
Ret	21	(Australia) Brad Jones	Brad Jones Racing	Ford Falcon (BA)	24	Retired	27
Ret	5	(Australia) Glenn Seton	Ford Performance Racing	Ford Falcon (BA)	11	Retired	12
DNS	24	(Australia) Wayne Wakefield	Paul Morris Motorsport	Holden Commodore (VX)	0	Did not start	
Fastest Lap: Marcos Ambrose (Stone Brothers Racing) - 1:11.0680 on lap 45

== Championship standings ==
Pos.	No	Driver	Team	Pts
1	50	(Australia) Jason Bright	Paul Weel Racing	1195
2	4	(Australia) Marcos Ambrose	Stone Brothers Racing	1159
3	51	(New Zealand) Greg Murphy	John Kelly Racing	1101
4	9	(Australia) Russell Ingall	Stone Brothers Racing	1013
5	16	(Australia) Paul Weel	Paul Weel Racing	1007
