= 2003 V8 Supercars Phillip Island round =

2003 Supercar Championship event

(Victoria (state)) 2003 Phillip Island V8 Supercar round
Event Information
- Round 2 of 13 in the 2003 V8 Supercar Championship Series
- Date: 11-13 April 2003
- Location: Phillip Island, Victoria
- Venue: Phillip Island Grand Prix Circuit
- Weather: Overcast evolving to heavy rain

Results
Race 1
| Distance | 54 laps | 238 km |
| Pole position | Mark Skaife; Holden Racing Team | 1:33.5994 |
| Winner | Craig Lowndes; Ford Performance Racing | 1:37:39.1273 |
Round Results
| First | Craig Lowndes; Ford Performance Racing | 192 pts |
| Second | Jason Bright; Paul Weel Racing | 186 pts |
| Third | Greg Murphy; Tom Walkinshaw Racing Australia | 180 pts |

The 2003 Phillip Island V8 Supercar round was the second round of the 2003 V8 Supercar Championship Series. It was held on the weekend of 11 to 13 April at the Phillip Island Grand Prix Circuit in Victoria, Australia. The race was scheduled for 67 laps at a distance of 300 kilometers.

Heavy rain toward the end of the race made track conditions treacherous, and the stewards made the decision to end the race on lap 54, 13 laps short of the scheduled 67 lap distance. Craig Lowndes had elected to undertake his compulsory pitstops late into the race, allowing him to switch to wet weather tyres without need for an additional pitstop. This gave Lowndes his first round win as a factory Ford driver and gave Ford Performance Racing their first race and round victory in the V8 Supercar category since their formation at the start of the season. Jason Bright finished in second, despite being at the center of a controversial late race incident with Marcos Ambrose, and Greg Murphy rounded out the podium.

Bright's second placing allowed him to usurp Skaife at the top of the driver standings heading into the next round at Eastern Creek. The V8 Supercar series would not return to Phillip Island for 2004, with the calendar slot vacated in anticipation of a round in Shanghai. While the Shanghai round would not eventuate until 2005, Phillip Island would return to the schedule as the season finale that same year.

== Background ==
The event was held on the weekend of 11 to 13 April 2003. It was the 12th ATCC/V8 Supercar event to be held at the Phillip Island Grand Prix Circuit and consisted of one 300 km race with two compulsory pitstops for fuel and tyres.

=== Entry list ===
There were 33 drivers entered into the event. It featured mixture of vehicle models - eight AU Ford Falcon's, eleven BA Falcon's, five VY Commodore's, and nine VX Commodore's.

Paul Romano was the only entrant from the previous round in Adelaide who did not return to the grid.

== Race report ==
=== Qualifying ===
Mark Skaife claimed provisional pole position with a time three hundredths of a second faster than nearest competitor, Marcos Ambrose. Russell Ingall did not take part in the session after sustaining heavy damage to his car after crashing at turn two in practice. David Thexton failed to qualify for the event after setting a time below the 105% threshold.

| Pos | No | Driver | Team | Vehicle | Time |
|---|---|---|---|---|---|
| 1 | 1 | (Australia) Mark Skaife | Holden Racing Team | Holden Commodore (VY) | 1:33.6884 |
| 2 | 4 | (Australia) Marcos Ambrose | Stone Brothers Racing | Ford Falcon (BA) | 1:33.7179 |
| 3 | 50 | (Australia) Jason Bright | Paul Weel Racing | Holden Commodore (VX) | 1:33.7311 |
| 4 | 2 | (Australia) Todd Kelly | Holden Racing Team | Holden Commodore (VY) | 1:33.9172 |
| 5 | 6 | (Australia) Craig Lowndes | Ford Performance Racing | Ford Falcon (BA) | 1:33.9195 |
| 6 | 51 | (New Zealand) Greg Murphy | Tom Walkinshaw Racing Australia | Holden Commodore (VX) | 1:34.0453 |
| 7 | 888 | (Australia) John Bowe | Brad Jones Racing | Ford Falcon (BA) | 1:34.1046 |
| 8 | 11 | (New Zealand) Steven Richards | Perkins Engineering | Holden Commodore (VX) | 1:34.1495 |
| 9 | 34 | (Australia) Garth Tander | Garry Rogers Motorsport | Holden Commodore (VY) | 1:34.2578 |
| 10 | 16 | (Australia) Paul Weel | Paul Weel Racing | Holden Commodore (VX) | 1:34.2883 |
| 11 | 44 | (New Zealand) Simon Wills | Team Dynamik | Holden Commodore (VY) | 1:34.2885 |
| 12 | 21 | (Australia) Brad Jones | Brad Jones Racing | Ford Falcon (BA) | 1:34.3471 |
| 13 | 15 | (Australia) Rick Kelly | Tom Walkinshaw Racing Australia | Holden Commodore (VX) | 1:34.4206 |
| 14 | 3 | (Australia) Cameron McConville | Lansvale Racing Team | Holden Commodore (VX) | 1:34.4482 |
| 15 | 18 | (Brazil) Max Wilson | Dick Johnson Racing | Ford Falcon (BA) | 1:34.5558 |
| 16 | 5 | (Australia) Glenn Seton | Ford Performance Racing | Ford Falcon (AU) | 1:34.6031 |
| 17 | 00 | (Australia) Greg Ritter | 00 Motorsport | Ford Falcon (BA) | 1:34.6699 |
| 18 | 45 | (New Zealand) Jason Richards | Team Dynamik | Holden Commodore (VY) | 1:34.7122 |
| 19 | 65 | (New Zealand) Paul Radisich | Briggs Motorsport | Ford Falcon (BA) | 1:34.7316 |
| 20 | 66 | (Australia) Dean Canto | Briggs Motorsport | Ford Falcon (BA) | 1:34.7353 |
| 21 | 31 | (Australia) Steven Ellery | Steven Ellery Racing | Ford Falcon (BA) | 1:34.8170 |
| 22 | 8 | (Australia) Paul Dumbrell | Perkins Engineering | Holden Commodore (VX) | 1:34.9900 |
| 23 | 19 | (Australia) David Besnard | Rod Nash Racing | Ford Falcon (AU) | 1:35.0856 |
| 24 | 29 | (Australia) Paul Morris | Paul Morris Motorsport | Holden Commodore (VY) | 1:35.3197 |
| 25 | 17 | (Australia) Steven Johnson | Dick Johnson Racing | Ford Falcon (BA) | 1:35.3332 |
| 26 | 33 | (Australia) Jamie Whincup | Garry Rogers Motorsport | Holden Commodore (VX) | 1:35.3738 |
| 27 | 20 | (Australia) Jason Bargwanna | Larkham Motorsport | Ford Falcon (AU) | 1:35.4221 |
| 28 | 23 | (Australia) Mark Noske | Noske Motorsport | Ford Falcon (AU) | 1:35.6234 |
| 29 | 10 | (Australia) Mark Larkham | Larkham Motorsport | Ford Falcon (AU) | 1:35.6293 |
| 30 | 7 | (Australia) Rodney Forbes | 00 Motorsport | Ford Falcon (AU) | 1:35.6970 |
| 31 | 75 | (Australia) Anthony Tratt | Paul Little Racing | Ford Falcon (AU) | 1:35.7864 |
| 32 | 021 | (New Zealand) Craig Baird | Team Kiwi Racing | Holden Commodore (VX) | 1:35.8393 |
| DNQ | 99 | (New Zealand) David Thexton | Thexton Motor Racing | Ford Falcon (AU) | 1:38.6432 |
| | 9 | (Australia) Russell Ingall | Stone Brothers Racing | Ford Falcon (BA) | no time |

=== Top ten shootout ===
Skaife successfully converted his provisional pole position in the shootout, setting a time nearly four tenths faster than teammate and nearest competitor, Todd Kelly.

| Pos | No | Driver | Team | Vehicle | Time |
|---|---|---|---|---|---|
| 1 | 1 | (Australia) Mark Skaife | Holden Racing Team | Holden Commodore (VY) | 1:33.5994 |
| 2 | 2 | (Australia) Todd Kelly | Holden Racing Team | Holden Commodore (VY) | 1:33.9104 |
| 3 | 4 | (Australia) Marcos Ambrose | Stone Brothers Racing | Ford Falcon (BA) | 1:33.9131 |
| 4 | 50 | (Australia) Jason Bright | Paul Weel Racing | Holden Commodore (VX) | 1:34.0101 |
| 5 | 51 | (New Zealand) Greg Murphy | Tom Walkinshaw Racing Australia | Holden Commodore (VX) | 1:34.4169 |
| 6 | 6 | (Australia) Craig Lowndes | Ford Performance Racing | Ford Falcon (BA) | 1:34.5677 |
| 7 | 888 | (Australia) John Bowe | Brad Jones Racing | Ford Falcon (BA) | 1:34.8144 |
| 8 | 11 | (New Zealand) Steven Richards | Perkins Engineering | Holden Commodore (VX) | 1:34.9543 |
| 9 | 16 | (Australia) Paul Weel | Paul Weel Racing | Holden Commodore (VX) | 1:35.7069 |
| 10 | 34 | (Australia) Garth Tander | Garry Rogers Motorsport | Holden Commodore (VY) | 1:35.8296 |

=== Race ===
The race started off in dry conditions, but there was a great chance of rain as dark cloud loomed overhead. Skaife retained the lead heading into turn one with Bright filing in behind for second. At the conclusion of lap one, Skaife had established a lead of 1.3 seconds over Bright. David Besnard was an early casualty of the race after suffering from a clutch plate issue.

Paul Weel was among the first to complete a compulsory pitstop on lap eight in response to a rear wheel rubbing on the guard. By lap ten, the first reports of rain were issued. Steven Ellery began to suffer from a broken exhaust which stunted the cars bottom-end power and his overall pace was strained. Max Wilson and Paul Morris tangled at the turn four hairpin, sending Wilson off into the runoff. Bright made his first pitstop on lap 21 for fuel while Skaife made his pitstop on lap 26. The Holden Racing Team managed to complete the stop fast enough for Skaife to emerge back ahead of Bright. However, he would be issued a drive-through penalty for speed in the pitlane. A couple laps after undertaking the penalty, Skaife spun Greg Murphy at MG after attempting an overtake. Ford Performance Racing kept Lowndes out until lap 36 before they pitted him for his fuel stop. Cameron McConville retired from the race on lap 22 after experiencing an engine failure.

On lap 39, Skaife completed his second compulsory stop for tyres. By lap 44, the threat of rain was growing. The circuit helicopter had been grounded due to the threat of lightning and teams were beginning to look skyward for the impending downpour. While Bright and Lowndes were first and second on the road, the first driver to have completed both pitstops was Marcos Ambrose. By lap 46, the rain had begun to change the condition of the track and drivers began to pit for wet weather tyres, the first being Garth Tander and Glenn Seton. One lap later, Lowndes and Jason Bright followed suit, and in the process, completed their second compulsory pitstops for tyres.

Toward the end of lap 49, on the approach to the pit entry, Bright and Ambrose made contact as the latter attempted to enter the pits while the former was attempting an overtake. The two cars continued side-by-side beyond the lane with Bright's car in the grass before further contact sent Ambrose into a spin at the final corner. Bright readdressed the situation and gave track position back to Ambrose. This brought Lowndes right up into the leading battle and soon assumed the lead itself after damage to the front-left suspension halted Bright's pace. Ambrose ran off the road at turn two and was barely able to escape the gravel trap to return to the track. Soon after, the deluge began to catch other drivers out. Paul Dumbrell spun off at turn three and became beached in the gravel trap. With the driving conditions becoming treacherous, even on a wet tyre, the safety car was deployed.

After a few laps behind the safety car, the decision was made to declare the race at lap 54. This gave Lowndes his first overall round victory for as a Ford driver and Ford Performance Racing's first race and round victory in the V8 Supercar category. Podium celebrations were annulled due to the inclement weather.

| Pos | No | Driver | Team | Car | Laps | Time/Retired | Grid |
|---|---|---|---|---|---|---|---|
| 1 | 6 | (Australia) Craig Lowndes | Ford Performance Racing | Ford Falcon (BA) | 54 | 01:37:39.1273 | 6 |
| 2 | 50 | (Australia) Jason Bright | Paul Weel Racing | Holden Commodore (VX) | 54 | + 4.610 | 4 |
| 3 | 51 | (New Zealand) Greg Murphy | Tom Walkinshaw Racing Australia | Holden Commodore (VX) | 54 | + 5.812 | 5 |
| 4 | 34 | (Australia) Garth Tander | Garry Rogers Motorsport | Holden Commodore (VY) | 54 | + 10.350 | 10 |
| 5 | 2 | (Australia) Todd Kelly | Holden Racing Team | Holden Commodore (VY) | 54 | + 13.717 | 2 |
| 6 | 1 | (Australia) Mark Skaife | Holden Racing Team | Holden Commodore (VY) | 54 | + 15.898 | 1 |
| 7 | 11 | (New Zealand) Steven Richards | Perkins Engineering | Holden Commodore (VX) | 54 | + 19.513 | 8 |
| 8 | 16 | (Australia) Paul Weel | Paul Weel Racing | Holden Commodore (VX) | 54 | + 20.252 | 9 |
| 9 | 5 | (Australia) Glenn Seton | Ford Performance Racing | Ford Falcon (AU) | 54 | + 23.536 | 16 |
| 10 | 9 | (Australia) Russell Ingall | Stone Brothers Racing | Ford Falcon (BA) | 54 | + 25.054 | 33 |
| 11 | 15 | (Australia) Rick Kelly | Tom Walkinshaw Racing Australia | Holden Commodore (VX) | 54 | + 25.946 | 13 |
| 12 | 65 | (New Zealand) Paul Radisich | Briggs Motorsport | Ford Falcon (BA) | 54 | + 33.415 | 19 |
| 13 | 29 | (Australia) Paul Morris | Paul Morris Motorsport | Holden Commodore (VY) | 54 | + 34.188 | 24 |
| 14 | 00 | (Australia) Greg Ritter | 00 Motorsport | Ford Falcon (BA) | 54 | + 35.641 | 17 |
| 15 | 21 | (Australia) Brad Jones | Brad Jones Racing | Ford Falcon (BA) | 54 | + 38.848 | 12 |
| 16 | 18 | (Brazil) Max Wilson | Dick Johnson Racing | Ford Falcon (BA) | 54 | + 40.221 | 15 |
| 17 | 4 | (Australia) Marcos Ambrose | Stone Brothers Racing | Ford Falcon (BA) | 53 | + 1 lap | 3 |
| 18 | 17 | (Australia) Steven Johnson | Dick Johnson Racing | Ford Falcon (BA) | 53 | + 1 lap | 25 |
| 19 | 021 | (New Zealand) Craig Baird | Team Kiwi Racing | Holden Commodore (VX) | 53 | + 1 lap | 32 |
| 20 | 31 | (Australia) Steven Ellery | Steven Ellery Racing | Ford Falcon (BA) | 53 | + 1 lap | 21 |
| 21 | 888 | (Australia) John Bowe | Brad Jones Racing | Ford Falcon (BA) | 53 | + 1 lap | 7 |
| 22 | 44 | (New Zealand) Simon Wills | Team Dynamik | Holden Commodore (VY) | 53 | + 1 lap | 11 |
| 23 | 10 | (Australia) Mark Larkham | Larkham Motorsport | Ford Falcon (AU) | 53 | + 1 lap | 29 |
| 24 | 75 | (Australia) Anthony Tratt | Paul Little Racing | Ford Falcon (AU) | 53 | + 1 lap | 31 |
| 25 | 33 | (Australia) Jamie Whincup | Garry Rogers Motorsport | Holden Commodore (VX) | 53 | + 1 lap | 26 |
| 26 | 20 | (Australia) Jason Bargwanna | Larkham Motorsport | Ford Falcon (AU) | 53 | + 1 lap | 27 |
| 27 | 7 | (Australia) Rodney Forbes | 00 Motorsport | Ford Falcon (AU) | 53 | + 1 lap | 30 |
| 28 | 45 | (New Zealand) Jason Richards | Team Dynamik | Holden Commodore (VY) | 53 | + 1 lap | 18 |
| 29 | 66 | (Australia) Dean Canto | Briggs Motorsport | Ford Falcon (BA) | 53 | + 1 lap | 20 |
| 30 | 23 | (Australia) Mark Noske | Noske Motorsport | Ford Falcon (AU) | 52 | + 2 laps | 28 |
| 31 | 8 | (Australia) Paul Dumbrell | Perkins Engineering | Holden Commodore (VX) | 52 | + 2 laps | 22 |
| Ret | 3 | (Australia) Cameron McConville | Lansvale Racing Team | Holden Commodore (VX) | 22 | Engine | 14 |
| Ret | 19 | (Australia) David Besnard | Rod Nash Racing | Ford Falcon (AU) | 1 | Clutch | 23 |
| DNQ | 99 | (New Zealand) David Thexton | Thexton Motor Racing | Ford Falcon (AU) | | Did not qualify | |
Fastest Lap: Mark Skaife (Holden Racing Team) - 1:35.0896 on lap 9

== Championship standings ==
| Pos. | No | Driver | Team | Pts |
|---|---|---|---|---|
| 1 | 50 | (Australia) Jason Bright | Paul Weel Racing | 357 |
| 2 | 1 | (Australia) Mark Skaife | Holden Racing Team | 351 |
| 3 | 2 | (Australia) Todd Kelly | Holden Racing Team | 336 |
| 4 | 11 | (New Zealand) Steven Richards | Perkins Engineering | 336 |
| 5 | 51 | (New Zealand) Greg Murphy | Tom Walkinshaw Racing Australia | 315 |
