= 2003 V8 Supercar Championship Series =

Motor racing competition

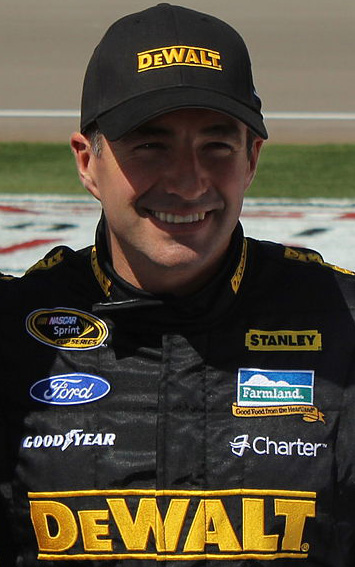
Marcos Ambrose won his first V8 Supercar Championship with Stone Brothers Racing.

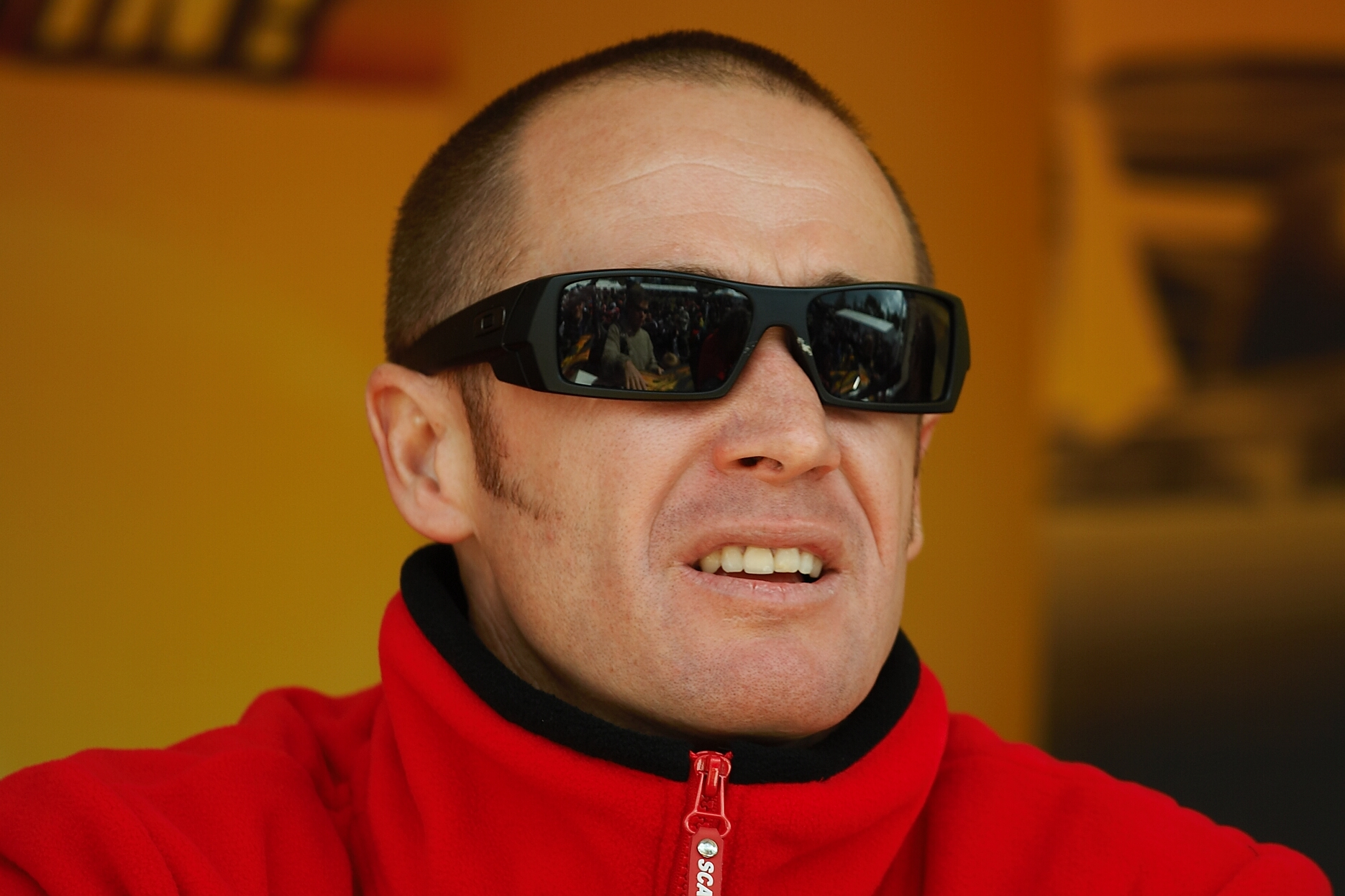
Greg Murphy finished second for the second consecutive season.

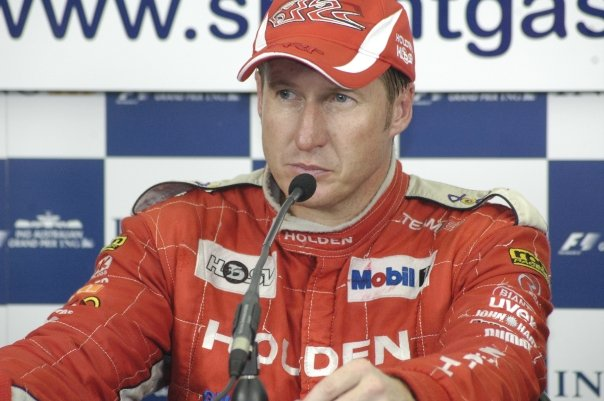
Mark Skaife finished third, ending a three season long winning streak.

The 2003 V8 Supercar Championship Series was a motor racing series for V8 Supercars. The series, which was the fifth V8 Supercar Championship Series, began on 22 March 2003 in Adelaide and ended on 30 November at Eastern Creek Raceway after 13 rounds. It ended with the awarding of the 44th Australian Touring Car Championship title by the Confederation of Australian Motor Sport to Tasmanian driver Marcos Ambrose. It was the first time a Stone Brothers Racing driver had won the championship and marked the first title win by a Ford driver since Glenn Seton in 1997, ending a five-year run by Holden Racing Team.

== Calendar ==
The 2003 V8 Supercar Championship Series consisted of 13 rounds which included eleven sprint rounds of one, two or three races and two longer distance endurance races requiring two drivers per car.

Rd.	Round Name, Circuit	City / state	Date
1	Clipsal 500 Adelaide, Adelaide Street Circuit	Adelaide, South Australia	20–23 March
2	Phillip Island	Phillip Island, Victoria	11–13 April
3	Eastern Creek Raceway	Eastern Creek, New South Wales	2–4 May
4	Winton Motor Raceway	Benalla, Victoria	23–25 May
5	VB 300, Barbagallo Raceway	Perth, Western Australia	6–8 June
6	Hidden Valley Raceway	Darwin, Northern Territory	27–29 June
7	BigPond 300, Queensland Raceway	Ipswich, Queensland	18–20 July
8	Oran Park Raceway	Sydney, New South Wales	15–17 August
9	Betta Electrical Sandown 500, Sandown International Raceway	Melbourne, Victoria	12–14 September
10	Bob Jane T-Marts 1000, Mount Panorama Circuit	Bathurst, New South Wales	9–12 October
11	Gillette V8 Supercar Challenge, Surfers Paradise Street Circuit	Surfers Paradise, Queensland	23–26 October
12	Placemakers V8 International, Pukekohe Park Raceway	Pukekohe, New Zealand	7–9 November
13	VIP Petfoods Main Event, Eastern Creek Raceway	Eastern Creek, New South Wales	28–30 November

Australian rounds

New Zealand rounds

== Teams and drivers ==
The following drivers and teams competed in the 2003 V8 Supercar Championship Series. The series consisted of eleven rounds of sprint racing and two rounds (the Sandown 500 and the Bathurst 1000) of endurance racing with each car piloted by two drivers.

Manufacturer	Vehicle	Team	No.	Drivers	Events	Endurance Event Drivers
Ford	Falcon AU	Ford Performance Racing	5	(Australia) Glenn Seton	1–3	—N/a
Ford	Falcon AU	Rod Nash Racing (FPR)	19	(Australia) David Besnard	1–6	—N/a
Ford	Falcon AU	00 Motorsport	7	(Australia) Rodney Forbes	1–3	—N/a
Ford	Falcon AU	Larkham Motorsport	10	(Australia) Mark Larkham	1–8, 11–13	—N/a
Ford	Falcon AU	Larkham Motorsport	20	(Australia) Jason Bargwanna	1–7	—N/a
Ford	Falcon AU	Larkham Motorsport	20	(Australia) Grant Johnson	9–10	(Australia) Kerry Wade
Ford	Falcon AU	Noske Motorsport	23	(Australia) Mark Noske	1–8, 11–13	—N/a
Ford	Falcon AU	Noske Motorsport	23	(Australia) Neal Bates	9–10	(Australia) Rick Bates
Ford	Falcon AU	Paul Little Racing	75	(Australia) Anthony Tratt	1–7	—N/a
Ford	Falcon AU	Thexton Motor Racing	99	(New Zealand) David Thexton	1–4, 6–13	(Australia) Brett Peters* (Australia) Stephen Voight**
Ford	Falcon BA	Stone Brothers Racing	4	(Australia) Marcos Ambrose	All	(Australia) Russell Ingall
Ford	Falcon BA	Stone Brothers Racing	9	(Australia) Russell Ingall	1–8, 11–13	—N/a
Ford	Falcon BA	Stone Brothers Racing	9	(Australia) Mark Noske	9–10	(Australia) Mark Winterbottom
Ford	Falcon BA	Ford Performance Racing	5	(Australia) Glenn Seton	4–8, 11–13	—N/a
Ford	Falcon BA	Ford Performance Racing	5	(Australia) Darren Hossack	9–10	(Australia) Adam Macrow
Ford	Falcon BA	Ford Performance Racing	6	(Australia) Craig Lowndes	All	(Australia) Glenn Seton
Ford	Falcon BA	Rod Nash Racing (FPR)	7	(Australia) David Besnard	11–13	—N/a
Ford	Falcon BA	Rod Nash Racing (FPR)	19	(Australia) David Besnard	7–10	(Australia) Owen Kelly
Ford	Falcon BA	00 Motorsport	7	(Australia) Rodney Forbes	4, 6	—N/a
Ford	Falcon BA	00 Motorsport	00	(Australia) Rodney Forbes	5	—N/a
Ford	Falcon BA	00 Motorsport	00	(Australia) Greg Ritter	1–4, 6	—N/a
Ford	Falcon BA	Larkham Motorsport	10	(Australia) Mark Larkham	9–10	(Australia) Jason Bargwanna
Ford	Falcon BA	Larkham Motorsport	20	(Australia) Jason Bargwanna	8, 11–13	—N/a
Ford	Falcon BA	Dick Johnson Racing	17	(Australia) Steven Johnson	All	(Australia) Warren Luff
Ford	Falcon BA	Dick Johnson Racing	18	(Brazil) Max Wilson	All	(Australia) David Brabham
Ford	Falcon BA	Brad Jones Racing	21	(Australia) Brad Jones	All	(Australia) John Bowe
Ford	Falcon BA	Brad Jones Racing	888	(Australia) John Bowe	1–8, 11–13	—N/a
Ford	Falcon BA	Brad Jones Racing	888	(United Kingdom) John Cleland	9–10	(Australia) Andrew Jones
Ford	Falcon BA	Steven Ellery Racing	31	(Australia) Steven Ellery	All	(Australia) Luke Youlden
Ford	Falcon BA	Briggs Motorsport 8 Triple Eight Race Engineering 5	65	(New Zealand) Paul Radisich	All	(Sweden) Rickard Rydell
Ford	Falcon BA	Briggs Motorsport 8 Triple Eight Race Engineering 5	66	(Australia) Dean Canto	All	(Australia) Matthew White
Ford	Falcon BA	Paul Little Racing	75	(Australia) Anthony Tratt	8–13	(Australia) Paul Stokell
Holden	Commodore VX	Tom Walkinshaw Racing Australia 4 (HRT); John Kelly Racing 9 (HRT)	15	(Australia) Rick Kelly	1–8, 11–13	—N/a
Holden	Commodore VX	Tom Walkinshaw Racing Australia 4 (HRT); John Kelly Racing 9 (HRT)	15	(Australia) Cameron McLean	9–10	(United Kingdom) Andy Priaulx
Holden	Commodore VX	Tom Walkinshaw Racing Australia 4 (HRT); John Kelly Racing 9 (HRT)	51	(New Zealand) Greg Murphy	1–7	—N/a
Holden	Commodore VX	Lansvale Smash Repairs	3	(Australia) Cameron McConville	All	(Australia) Tim Leahey
Holden	Commodore VX	Perkins Engineering	8	(Australia) Paul Dumbrell	All	(Australia) Tomas Mezera
Holden	Commodore VX	Perkins Engineering	11	(New Zealand) Steven Richards	1–5	—N/a
Holden	Commodore VX	Paul Weel Racing	16	(Australia) Paul Weel	1–8, 11–13	—N/a
Holden	Commodore VX	Paul Weel Racing	16	(Australia) Marcus Marshall	9–10	(Australia) Greg Ritter
Holden	Commodore VX	Paul Weel Racing	50	(Australia) Jason Bright	All	(Australia) Paul Weel
Holden	Commodore VX	Team Kiwi Racing	021	(New Zealand) Craig Baird	All	(New Zealand) Mark Porter
Holden	Commodore VX	Romano Racing	24	(Australia) Paul Romano	1	—N/a
Holden	Commodore VX	Paul Morris Motorsport	24	(Australia) Wayne Wakefield	3–4, 7–8, 10	(New Zealand) Andy McElrea
Holden	Commodore VX	Paul Morris Motorsport	24	(Australia) Alan Gurr	9	(New Zealand) Andy McElrea
Holden	Commodore VX	Garry Rogers Motorsport	33	(Australia) Jamie Whincup	1–9, 11–12	(Denmark) Allan Simonsen
Holden	Commodore VX	Garry Rogers Motorsport	33	(Australia) Nathan Pretty	10	(Denmark) Allan Simonsen
Holden	Commodore VY	Holden Racing Team	1	(Australia) Mark Skaife	All	(Australia) Todd Kelly
Holden	Commodore VY	Holden Racing Team	2	(Australia) Todd Kelly	1–8, 11–13	—N/a
Holden	Commodore VY	Holden Racing Team	2	(New Zealand) Jim Richards	9–10	(Australia) Tony Longhurst
Holden	Commodore VY	John Kelly Racing (HRT)	51	(New Zealand) Greg Murphy	8–13	(Australia) Rick Kelly
Holden	Commodore VY	Perkins Engineering	11	(New Zealand) Steven Richards	6–13	(Australia) Larry Perkins
Holden	Commodore VY	Paul Morris Motorsport	29	(Australia) Paul Morris	All	(New Zealand) John Faulkner
Holden	Commodore VY	Garry Rogers Motorsport	33	(Australia) Jamie Whincup	13	—N/a
Holden	Commodore VY	Garry Rogers Motorsport	34	(Australia) Garth Tander	All	(Australia) Nathan Pretty* (Australia) Jamie Whincup**
Holden	Commodore VY	Team Dynamik	44	(New Zealand) Simon Wills	All	(New Zealand) Jason Richards
Holden	Commodore VY	Team Dynamik	45	(New Zealand) Jason Richards	1–8, 11–13	—N/a
Holden	Commodore VY	Team Dynamik	45	(France) Nicolas Minassian	9–10	(Australia) Wayne Wakefield* (Denmark) Jan Magnussen**
Wildcard Entries
Ford	Falcon AU	Fernández Racing	55	(Australia) José Fernández	10	(Australia) David Russell
Ford	Falcon AU	Sydney Star Racing	89	(Australia) Mal Rose	10	(Australia) Grant Elliott**
Holden	Commodore VX	Robert Smith Racing	13	(Australia) Phillip Scifleet	9–10	(Australia) Steve Owen
Holden	Commodore VX	Robert Smith Racing	72	(Australia) Alan Gurr	10	(New Zealand) Jonny Reid
Holden	Commodore VX	Lansvale Smash Repairs	24	(Australia) David Krause	13	—N/a
Holden	Commodore VX	John Faulkner Racing	46	(Australia) Tony Ricciardello	9–10	(Australia) Dale Brede
Holden	Commodore VX	Phoenix Motorsport	59	(Australia) Jamie Miller	10	(Australia) Ron Searle
Holden	Commodore VX	Robert Jones Racing	69	(Australia) Robert Jones	10	(Australia) Peter Doulman

* = Drove in Sandown 500 only

** = Drove in Bathurst 1000 only

=== Driver changes ===
- Jason Bright left the Holden Racing Team to join Paul Weel Racing.
- Todd Kelly left Tom Walkinshaw Racing Australia to join the Holden Racing Team replacing Jason Bright.
- Rick Kelly left Holden Young Lions to join Tom Walkinshaw Racing Australia replacing his brother Todd.
- Russell Ingall left Perkins Engineering to join Stone Brothers Racing replacing David Besnard.
- David Besnard left Stone Brothers Racing to join Ford Performance Racing.
- Craig Lowndes left 00 Motorsport to join Ford Performance Racing.
- Greg Ritter returned to the Supercars Championship joining 00 Motorsport replacing Craig Lowndes.
- Larry Perkins stepped down from full-time competition. He joined Steven Richards for the endurance rounds.
- Mark Noske returned to the Supercars Championship joining ICS Team Ford. He later joined Mark Winterbottom for the endurance rounds. Neal Bates substituted for him at ICS Team Ford.
- Jason Bargwanna left Garry Rogers Motorsport to join Larkham Motorsport.
- Paul Radisich and Max Wilson effectively swapped seats, with Radisich moving to Briggs Motor Sport and Wilson to Dick Johnson Racing.
- Jason Richards left Team Kiwi Racing to join Team Dynamik.
- Craig Baird left Rod Nash Racing and replaced Jason Richards at Team Kiwi Racing.

=== Team changes ===
- Ford Performance Racing expanded to a three car team.
- Perkins Engineering scaled down to a two car team.
- Following the collapse of Tom Walkinshaw Racing in February, the Holden Racing Team and Tom Walkinshaw Racing Australia entries were sold to Skaife Sports Pty Ltd and John Kelly Racing respectively.

== Results and standings ==
=== Results summary ===
Round	Race	Event	Pole position	Race winners	Round winner	Report
1	R1	Adelaide	(Australia) Jason Bright	(Australia) Marcos Ambrose	(Australia) Mark Skaife (Holden Racing Team, Holden)	report
1	R2	Adelaide		(Australia) Mark Skaife	(Australia) Mark Skaife (Holden Racing Team, Holden)	report
2		Phillip Island	(Australia) Mark Skaife	(Australia) Craig Lowndes (Ford Performance Racing, Ford)		report
3		Eastern Creek 1	(Australia) Marcos Ambrose	(Australia) Marcos Ambrose (Stone Brothers Racing, Ford)		report
4		Winton	(Australia) Marcos Ambrose	(Australia) Marcos Ambrose (Stone Brothers Racing, Ford)		report
5	R1	Perth	(New Zealand) Greg Murphy	(New Zealand) Greg Murphy	(Australia) Marcos Ambrose (Stone Brothers Racing, Ford)	report
5	R2	Perth		(Australia) Mark Skaife	(Australia) Marcos Ambrose (Stone Brothers Racing, Ford)	report
5	R3	Perth		(Australia) Marcos Ambrose	(Australia) Marcos Ambrose (Stone Brothers Racing, Ford)	report
6	R1	Darwin	(Australia) Mark Skaife	(Australia) Mark Skaife	(Australia) Marcos Ambrose (Stone Brothers Racing, Ford)	report
6	R2	Darwin		(Australia) Marcos Ambrose	(Australia) Marcos Ambrose (Stone Brothers Racing, Ford)	report
6	R3	Darwin		(Australia) Marcos Ambrose	(Australia) Marcos Ambrose (Stone Brothers Racing, Ford)	report
7		Ipswich	(Australia) Marcos Ambrose	(Australia) Russell Ingall (Stone Brothers Racing, Ford)		report
8		Oran Park	(Australia) Marcos Ambrose	(Australia) Marcos Ambrose (Stone Brothers Racing, Ford)		report
9		Sandown	(Australia) Marcos Ambrose	(Australia) Mark Skaife (Australia) Todd Kelly (Holden Racing Team, Holden)		report
10		Bathurst	(New Zealand) Greg Murphy	(New Zealand) Greg Murphy (Australia) Rick Kelly (John Kelly Racing, Holden)		report
11	R1	Gold Coast	(Australia) Todd Kelly	(Australia) Russell Ingall	(Australia) Russell Ingall (Stone Brothers Racing, Ford)	report
11	R2	Gold Coast		(Australia) Russell Ingall	(Australia) Russell Ingall (Stone Brothers Racing, Ford)	report
12	R1	Pukekohe	(New Zealand) Greg Murphy	(New Zealand) Greg Murphy	(New Zealand) Greg Murphy (John Kelly Racing, Holden)	report
12	R2	Pukekohe		(New Zealand) Greg Murphy	(New Zealand) Greg Murphy (John Kelly Racing, Holden)	report
12	R3	Pukekohe		(Australia) Mark Skaife	(New Zealand) Greg Murphy (John Kelly Racing, Holden)	report
13	R1	Eastern Creek 2	(Australia) Mark Skaife	(Australia) Marcos Ambrose	(Australia) Marcos Ambrose (Stone Brothers Racing, Ford)	report
13	R2	Eastern Creek 2		(Australia) Marcos Ambrose	(Australia) Marcos Ambrose (Stone Brothers Racing, Ford)	report

=== Drivers championship ===
Drivers were required to drop the points earned at their worst round from their total, regardless of how many rounds were entered. Drivers who only entered one round lost all their points.

Pos.	Driver	No.	ADE (South Australia)		PHI (Victoria (state))	EAS1 (New South Wales)	WIN (Victoria (state))	BAR (Western Australia)			HID (Northern Territory)			QLD (Queensland)	ORA (New South Wales)	SAN (Victoria (state))	BAT (New South Wales)	SUR (Queensland)		PUK (New Zealand)			EAS2 (New South Wales)		Pen.	Pts.
1	(Australia) Marcos Ambrose	4	1	**Ret**	17	**1**	**1**	3	2	1	2	1	**1**	**2**	**1**	**5**	6	6	4	6	23	9	1	**1**	0	2085
2	(New Zealand) Greg Murphy	51	10	11	3	5	14	**1**	**4**	3	6	5	2	8	11	3	**1**	2	2	**1**	**1**	**3**	23	DNS	0	1983
3	(Australia) Mark Skaife	1	2	1	**6**	19	6	2	1	**23**	**1**	**2**	3	Ret	3	1	8	3	3	7	2	1	**7**	Ret	105	1817
4	(Australia) Jason Bright	50	**3**	6	2	4	2	12	10	10	3	4	4	5	19	31	Ret	4	Ret	21	3	2	2	2	0	1770
5	(Australia) Craig Lowndes	6	Ret	7	1	2	10	6	Ret	17	28	27	15	6	2	16	2	15	9	16	12	18	6	4	0	1756
6	(New Zealand) Steven Richards	11	4	2	7	8	3	4	3	8	9	6	5	Ret	23	6	4	Ret	22	20	6	6	4	16	50	1709
7	(Australia) Russell Ingall	9	7	12	10	3	4	5	27	14	Ret	17	8	1	8	5	6	1	**1**	19	26	10	DSQ	DSQ	90	1701
8	(Australia) Rick Kelly	15	9	24	11	9	11	10	9	4	14	7	18	9	24	3	1	5	7	8	13	5	25	10	25	1675
9	(Australia) Todd Kelly	2	5	5	5	Ret	DSQ	7	7	2	7	24	Ret	3	6	1	8	**10**	Ret	2	4	4	3	Ret	0	1628
10	(New Zealand) Paul Radisich	65	12	4	12	15	7	16	13	6	5	8	23	Ret	Ret	7	7	11	6	5	7	8	12	7	0	1618
11	(Australia) John Bowe	888	Ret	23	21	30	8	30	11	11	10	10	7	7	7	4	10	14	10	12	10	Ret	11	14	0	1478
12	(Australia) Garth Tander	34	13	15	4	6	Ret	9	5	5	4	3	24	25	4	18	19	16	Ret	3	Ret	21	22	5	0	1470
13	(Australia) Paul Weel	16	14	3	8	11	5	13	6	7	12	11	13	10	16	22	Ret	13	16	15	11	12	29	Ret	0	1450
14	(Australia) Jason Bargwanna	20	15	19	26	14	13	Ret	Ret	DNS	17	13	20	17	15	9	Ret	17	13	4	5	13	9	6	0	1341
15	(Australia) Glenn Seton	5	18	10	9	26	12	14	15	18	Ret	16	17	Ret	Ret	16	2	12	5	11	9	11	18	Ret	0	1266
16	(Australia) Steven Johnson	17	6	Ret	18	17	19	29	18	12	13	29	12	12	Ret	15	13	8	8	10	Ret	16	20	Ret	0	1229
17	(Brazil) Max Wilson	18	26	Ret	16	16	9	24	17	13	Ret	20	16	24	Ret	19	12	9	23	18	24	19	5	3	0	1214
18	(Australia) Cameron McConville	3	8	Ret	Ret	12	17	21	8	9	23	14	14	15	9	Ret	20	19	15	Ret	18	20	10	8	0	1191
19	(Australia) Steven Ellery	31	29	DSQ	20	22	25	11	16	Ret	8	15	9	14	21	2	3	Ret	Ret	9	21	14	24	23	0	1164
20	(Australia) Brad Jones	21	24	18	15	Ret	26	15	14	15	15	21	10	Ret	12	4	10	Ret	18	22	22	15	16	18	0	1127
21	(Australia) David Besnard	19/7	Ret	Ret	Ret	13	24	20	20	Ret	24	18	28	11	13	8	Ret	7	Ret	25	15	Ret	28	11	0	1059
22	(New Zealand) Simon Wills	44	16	9	22	7	Ret	8	Ret	16	11	9	6	Ret	Ret	Ret	22	22	11	13	8	7	Ret	22	0	1059
23	(Australia) Paul Morris	29	27	20	13	10	Ret	18	Ret	20	Ret	23	30	4	Ret	13	Ret	20	19	14	16	Ret	8	19	0	1047
24	(Australia) Dean Canto	66	20	Ret	29	23	23	27	22	26	18	12	19	22	10	14	Ret	Ret	24	17	14	25	15	9	0	1001
25	(Australia) Mark Larkham	10	23	16	23	18	22	26	23	27	26	30	21	Ret	18	9	Ret	18	17	27	20	23	19	Ret	0	949
26	(New Zealand) Jason Richards	45	28	Ret	28	21	15	28	12	25	16	31	24	20	5	Ret	22	23	Ret	DNS	DNS	DNS	14	21	0	909
27	(Australia) Jamie Whincup	33	17	22	25	Ret	Ret	22	Ret	21	20	Ret	11	16	20	29	19	25	12	28	17	Ret	13	15	0	906
28	(Australia) Mark Noske	23/9	Ret	13	30	27	18	17	19	19	19	25	29	21	14	11	Ret	Ret	25	Ret	DNS	DNS	17	13	0	905
29	(Australia) Paul Dumbrell	8	11	8	31	20	Ret	19	26	Ret	27	22	Ret	13	17	Ret	14	26	21	24	28	17	21	12	0	887
30	(New Zealand) Craig Baird	021	21	14	19	24	DSQ	25	24	22	22	19	27	18	22	Ret	17	21	14	23	19	22	26	20	0	856
31	(Australia) Anthony Tratt	75	19	Ret	24	Ret	16	31	21	24	25	Ret	DNS	19	Ret	30	Ret	24	20	Ret	25	24	27	17	0	678
32	(Australia) Greg Ritter	00/16	22	13	14	28	20				29	26	20			22	Ret								0	537
33	(New Zealand) David Thexton	99	DNQ	DNQ	DNQ	29	DNQ				DNQ	DNQ	DNQ	23	DNQ	26	16	DNQ	DNQ	26	27	26	DNQ	DNQ	0	348
34	(Australia) Rodney Forbes	7	25	21	27	25	DSQ	23	25	28	21	28	26												0	238
35	(Australia) Luke Youlden	31														2	3								0	188
36	(Australia) Larry Perkins	11														6	4								0	180
37	(Australia) Tony Longhurst	2														10	5								0	176
37	(New Zealand) Jim Richards	2														10	5								0	176
39	(Sweden) Rickard Rydell	65														7	7								0	168
40	(Australia) Owen Kelly	19														8	Ret								0	164
41	(United Kingdom) John Cleland	888														20	9								0	160
41	(Australia) Andrew Jones	888														20	9								0	160
43	(Australia) Wayne Wakefield	24/45				DNQ	21							DNQ	DNQ	28	DNQ								0	156
44	(France) Nicolas Minassian	45														28	11								0	152
44	(Australia) Mark Winterbottom	9														11	Ret								0	152
46	(Australia) David Brabham	18														19	12								0	148
47	(Australia) Cameron McLean	15														12	Ret								0	148
47	(United Kingdom) Andy Priaulx	15														12	Ret								0	148
49	(Australia) Warren Luff	17														15	13								0	144
49	(New Zealand) John Faulkner	29														13	Ret								0	144
51	(Australia) Matthew White	66														14	Ret								0	140
51	(Australia) Tomas Mezera	8														Ret	14								0	140
53	(Australia) Darren Hossack	5														17	Ret								0	128
53	(Australia) Adam Macrow	5														17	Ret								0	128
53	(New Zealand) Mark Porter	021														Ret	17								0	128
56	(Australia) Grant Johnson	20														23	18								0	124
56	(Australia) Kerry Wade	20														23	18								0	124
56	(Australia) Nathan Pretty	33														18	Ret								0	124
59	(Australia) Tim Leahey	3														Ret	20								0	116
60	(Australia) Steve Owen	13														21	21								0	112
60	(Australia) Phillip Scifleet	13														21	21								0	112
62	(Australia) Marcus Marshall	16														22	Ret								0	108
63	(Australia) Dale Brede	46														24	Ret								0	100
63	(Australia) Tony Ricciardello	46														24	Ret								0	100
65	(Australia) Neal Bates	23														25	Ret								0	100
65	(Australia) Rick Bates	23														25	Ret								0	100
67	(Australia) Alan Gurr	24/72														27	Ret								0	88
67	(New Zealand) Andy McElrea	24														27	DNQ								0	88
69	(Australia) Paul Stokell	75														30	Ret								0	80
69	(Denmark) Allan Simonsen	33														29	Ret								0	80
	(Denmark) Jan Magnussen	45															11								0	0
	(Australia) Jamie Miller	59															15								0	0
	(Australia) Ron Searle	59															15								0	0
	(Australia) Stephen Voight	99															16								0	0
	(Australia) Grant Elliott	89															23								0	0
	(Australia) Mal Rose	89															23								0	0
	(Australia) Brett Peters	99														26									0	0
	(Australia) Paul Romano	24	Ret	Ret																					0	0
	(Australia) David Krause	24																					Ret	Ret	0	0
	(Australia) Jose Fernandez	55															Ret								0	0
	(Australia) David Russell	55															Ret								0	0
	(Australia) Peter Doulman	69															Ret								0	0
	(Australia) Robert Jones	69															Ret								0	0
	(New Zealand) Jonny Reid	72															Ret								0	0
Pos.	Driver	No.	ADE (South Australia)		PHI (Victoria (state))	EAS1 (New South Wales)	WIN (Victoria (state))	BAR (Western Australia)			HID (Northern Territory)			QLD (Queensland)	ORA (New South Wales)	SAN (Victoria (state))	BAT (New South Wales)	SUR (Queensland)		PUK (New Zealand)			EAS2 (New South Wales)		Pen.	Pts.

Colour	Result
Gold	Winner
Silver	Second place
Bronze	Third place
Green	Points classification
Blue	Non-points classification
Blue	Non-classified finish (NC)
Purple	Retired, not classified (Ret)
Red	Did not qualify (DNQ)
Red	Did not pre-qualify (DNPQ)
Black	Disqualified (DSQ)
White	Did not start (DNS)
White	Withdrew (WD)
White	Race cancelled (C)
Blank	Did not practice (DNP)
Blank	Did not arrive (DNA)
Blank	Excluded (EX)

Bold - Pole position
Italics - Fastest lap

== See also ==
- 2003 V8 Supercar season
