= Lansvale Racing Team =

Australian motor racing team

- Team Principal: Trevor Ashby; Steve Reed
- Debut: 1986
- Final Season: 2003
- Round wins: 0
- Pole positions: 0

Lansvale Racing Team, also known as Lansvale Smash Repairs Racing, was an Australian motor racing team that competed in Australian touring car racing between 1986 and 2003.

== History ==
The team first appeared at the 1986 Bathurst 1000 when Sydney crash repair proprietors and Sports Sedan racers Trevor Ashby and Steve Reed debuted an ex Tony Mulvihill Holden Commodore VK. Over the ensuing years as well as appearing at the Bathurst 1000 the team would appear at most of the east coast rounds of the Australian Touring Car Championship with Ashby and Reed sharing the driving duties.

Steve Reed scored the team's only touring car race win when he won the Castrol Clash for Cash event at Sydney's Oran Park Raceway on 15 February 1987, prior to the start of the 1987 Australian Touring Car Championship. This was also significant in that it was the final Group A race win for the Holden VK Commodore SS Group A.

The car was initially prepared in-house at the Lansvale Smash Repairs' Enfield facility before moving to Ron Gillard's facility in Ballina. In 1999 the team expanded to two cars, preparing a customer Commodore VS for Rodney Forbes. In 2000 the team raced two cars with Ashby and Reed driving. In 2001, the team recruited Cameron McConville to race the team's new Commodore VX while Ashby and Reed competed in a VS. Ashby and Reed made their 16th consecutive and final start as a combination at the 2001 Bathurst 1000, a record that is unlikely to ever be broken.

The team's cars appeared in a variety of yellow, red and blue liveries over the years, usually with sponsorship from Dulux.

The team continued as a one-car operation before being sold to Tasman Motorsport at the end of 2003 and relocating to Melbourne. Ashby and Reed were minority shareholders in Tasman, before selling out.

== Drivers ==
- (Australia) Trevor Ashby (1986-2001)
- (Australia) Steve Reed (1986-2001)
- (Australia) Geoff Full (2000)
- (Australia) Phillip Scifleet (2000)
- (Australia) Cameron McConville (2001-03)
- (Australia) Rick Bates (2001)
- (Australia) Warren Luff (2002)
- (Australia) Tim Leahey (2003)
