= Steven Ellery Racing =

Australian motorsport team

- Team Principal: Bruce Ellery
- Debut: 1994
- Final Season: 2005
- Round wins: 0
- Pole positions: 0

Steven Ellery Racing was an Australia motorsport team which contested several series in its home country, including as the Supercheap Auto Racing V8 Supercar team. The team ceased operations at the end of 2005, with the lead driver Steven Ellery moving to Triple Eight Race Engineering for the 2005 season.

== History ==
Formed in 1992 by Bruce Ellery for his son's racing ambitions, Steven Ellery Racing was a team that lasted over a decade in Australian racing. The team ran Formula Ford a Van Diemen in 1992, expanding to a second car in 1993 for Garry Gosatti. The team moved into the Australian Super Touring Championship in 1994 with an ex Glenn Seton Racing Ford Sierra, before upgrading to a Tony Longhurst Racing BMW 318i in 1995. The team disbanded at the end of 1995 as Ellery moved into V8 Supercar racing for other teams.

=== V8 Supercar ===
The team only ever ran a single car for Steven Ellery in the main V8 Supercar championship, although it did expand to a second car for Luke Youlden to race in the V8 Supercar Development Series. In 1999 the team raced an ex Stone Brothers Racing Ford EL Falcon using the number #31. In 2000 the team started to use a Ford AU Falcon and brought in Supercheap Auto as naming rights sponsor and continued to use the car and until the start of the 2003 championship when they upgraded to a BA Falcon. The team finished just out of the top ten in most seasons, and Ellery paired with Youlden took third Place at the 2003 Bathurst 1000. In the middle of the Gold Coast round of 2004 Supercheap Auto left the team. The team ran the final two rounds of the season with sponsorship from Chelgrave Contracting, the sponsor which the team had run in 1999 as well as during its Super Touring appearances. At the end of 2004, the team closed its doors as Ellery moved to Team Betta Electrical for the 2005 season. The team would contest the 2005 Holden Performance Driving Centre V8 Supercar Series with two Ford BA Falcon’s for New Zealander Mark Porter and former V8 Utes driver Gary MacDonald before leaving the sport altogether.

== Supercars / ATCC drivers ==
italics = Part-time or Enduro Driver for the team

- (Australia) Steven Ellery (1994, 1999–2004)
- (Australia) Paul Stokell (2000)
- (Australia) Geoff Brabham (2001)
- (Australia) Luke Youlden (2002–2004)

== Super2 drivers ==
Part Time Drivers are listed in Italics

- (Australia) Bob Thorn (2002)
- (Australia) Luke Youlden (2002–2004)
- (New Zealand) Mark Porter (2005)
- (Australia) Gary MacDonald (2005)
