= Paul Little Racing =

Toll Racing
- Team Principal: Paul Little
- Debut: 1998
- Final Season: 2005
- Round wins: 0
- Pole positions: 0

Paul Little Racing, commonly known as Toll Racing after naming rights sponsor Toll, was a motorsport team which competed in the V8 Supercars championship. The team ceased operations at the end of 2005, with driver Anthony Tratt retiring from full-time driving.

== History ==
Formed in 1998 by Paul Little, Paul Little Racing lasted seven years, running a single car for Anthony Tratt. The team used a Ford Falcon EL in the 1998 season acquired from John Sidney Racing. 1999 saw the team move over to a new inhouse built Ford Falcon AU. In 2003, the team started the year in the old Falcon, before a Ford Falcon BA built by Acott Race Craft in Sunbury, Victoria was debuted mid-season. In 2004 the team switched to Holden purchasing a Holden Commodore VY from Perkins Engineering with Tomas Mezera as the enduro driver alongside Tratt. At the end of 2005 the team closed its doors.

=== Complete Bathurst 1000 results ===
Year	No.	Car	Drivers	Position	Laps
1998	75	Ford Falcon EL	(Australia) Anthony Tratt (Australia) Robert Jones (Australia) Garry Waldon	DNF	47
1999	75	Ford Falcon AU	(Australia) Anthony Tratt (Australia) Alan Jones	DNF	147
2000	75	Ford Falcon AU	(Australia) Anthony Tratt (Australia) Alan Jones	DNF	150
2001	75	Ford Falcon AU	(Australia) Anthony Tratt (Australia) Alan Jones	15th	158
2002	75	Ford Falcon AU	(Australia) Anthony Tratt (Australia) Paul Stokell	12th	160
2003	75	Ford Falcon BA	(Australia) Anthony Tratt (Australia) Paul Stokell	DNF	106
2004	75	Holden Commodore VY	(Australia) Anthony Tratt (Australia) Tomas Mezera	18th	157
2005	75	Holden Commodore VZ	(Australia) Anthony Tratt (Australia) Tony Evangelou	DNF	92
