= Dale Brede =

Australian racing driver (1974–2023)

- Nationality: Australian
- Born: 12 October 1974 Canberra, Australian Capital Territory, Australia
- Died: 11 July 2023 (aged 48) Queensland, Australia

V8 Supercars
- Years active: 2001–2006
- Teams: Harris Racing; Power Racing; Briggs Motor Sport; John Faulkner Racing; Team Dynamik; Brad Jones Racing
- Starts: 35
- Wins: 0
- Poles: 0
- Fastest laps: 0
- Best finish: 31st in 2004

Dale Adam Brede (12 October 1974 – 11 July 2023) was an Australian racing driver who most notably competed in the V8 Supercars Championship.

Brede attended Radford College in Canberra, graduating in 1992.

Brede died in July 2023, at the age of 48.

== Career summary ==
=== Junior formula ===
Brede made his racing car debut in the Queensland Formula Ford Championship, running two rounds with Greg Fahey Racing. Thereafter, he bought a Ralt R23 from Steve Cramp to compete in the Australian Drivers' Championship. Initially intending to run the car privately, a struggle to find results meant drafting Cramp in to run the car for him, and wound up finishing 12th in the overall standings.

The following season, Brede moved to NRC International in a Reynard 94D. Despite securing a competitive package with the Arthur Abraham's outfit, the only notable result of the year was a podium at Phillip Island en route to finishing eleventh in the driver standings. For 2000, Brede returned to the series with NRC International, finishing seventh overall with two podiums to his credit.

=== V8 Supercars ===
In 2001, the NRC International team would enter a car into the Konica V8 Supercar Developmental Series with Brede as its driver. Brede enjoyed a successful campaign with a string of strong results to finish the year sixth in the standings, securing two podiums that year at Oran Park and Mallala.

As well as this, Brede would make his V8 Supercar debut by way of a drive in the endurance events at Queensland with Harris Racing, and Bathurst with Power Racing. Driving alongside Craig Harris, the Queensland 500 campaign came to an end on lap 101. The Bathurst 1000 campaign with Alan Heath was a little more successful with the pair finishing 18th overall after qualifying 36th.

For 2002, Brede would shift to Harris Racing for the Konica V8 Supercar Series. Immediately, the partnership proved successful when Brede won the opening round at Wakefield Park. He would win another race in the finale at Mallala but with Paul Dumbrell dominating the championship, Brede would have to settle for runner-up honours in the championship. Initially expecting to compete in the V8 Supercar endurance events with Andrew Jones, Brede would be approached by Briggs Motor Sport who, along with drives in the Queensland and Bathurst events, also promised Brede with a full-time drive in the main series for 2023. However, at the conclusion of the season, Briggs' promise failed to materialise and Brede was momentarily left out of a drive.

Brede was afforded a lifeline in the form of the Holden Young Lions program being run by John Faulkner. After a moderately successful campaign that also saw him drive in the main series endurance events, Brede was approached by Team Dynamik to drive full-time in the V8 Supercar series for 2004 after negotiations with Garth Tander fell through. Accepting the deal, Brede's sole full season in the category would prove to be disappointing. Reliability issues curtailed his efforts which were further compounded by the teams growing financial woes. At the conclusion of the season, Brede would leave Team Dynamik.

After leaving Team Dynamik, Brede would secure an endurance contract with Brad Jones Racing for 2005, driving alongside John Cleland. The pairings best result came at Bathurst when they avoided the late race melee to finish seventh. The team would also enter him into two events in the developmental series to remain race-sharp.

Remaining with Brad Jones Racing for 2006, Brede was scheduled to race in the endurance events in the teams second car with Mark Porter. The duo finished 18th in the Sandown 500. In the lead-up to the Bathurst 1000, Porter lost his life in a crash in the development series. Michael Caruso was drafted in to replace him for the Bathurst 1000. On lap 59 of the race, Brede crashed at the end of Mountain Straight after failing to pump the brake pedal after a pitstop.

At the conclusion of this event, Brede consolidated his future in motor racing. He ultimately decided to devote more time to his family business and thus brought an end to his professional race car driving career.

=== Post racing ===
After retiring from racing, Brede owned and ran the Canberra Motorcycle Centre, one of the largest motorcycle dealerships in Australia. He also ran a works Suzuki team in the Australian Superbike Championship which won the title in 2017 with Josh Waters.

== Career results ==
Season	Series	Position	Car	Team
1998	Australian Drivers' Championship	12th	Ralt–Holden RT23	National Capital Motors
1999	Australian Drivers' Championship	11th	Reynard–Holden 94D	National Capital Motors
2000	Australian Drivers' Championship	7th	Reynard–Holden 94D	National Capital Motors
2001	Konica V8 Supercar Series	6th	Holden Commodore VT	NRC International
2001	V8 Supercar Championship Series	51st	Ford Falcon AU	Harris Racing; Power Racing
2002	Konica V8 Supercar Series	**2nd**	Ford Falcon AU	Harris Racing
2002	V8 Supercar Championship Series	51st	Ford Falcon AU	Briggs Motor Sport
2003	Konica V8 Supercar Series	6th	Holden Commodore VX	Holden Young Lions
2003	V8 Supercar Championship Series	63rd	Holden Commodore VX	John Faulkner Racing
2004	V8 Supercar Championship Series	31st	Holden Commodore VY	Team Dynamik
2005	HPDC V8 Supercar Series	24th	Ford Falcon AU	Brad Jones Racing
2005	V8 Supercar Championship Series	42nd	Ford Falcon BA	Brad Jones Racing
2006	V8 Supercar Championship Series	55th	Ford Falcon BA	Brad Jones Racing

=== Complete Bathurst 1000 results ===
Year	Team	Car	Co-driver	Position	Laps
2001	Power Racing	Ford Falcon AU	(Australia) Alan Heath	18th	155
2002	Briggs Motor Sport	Ford Falcon AU	(Australia) Steve Owen	17th	158
2003	John Faulkner Racing	Holden Commodore VX	(Australia) Tony Ricciardello	DNF	72
2004	Team Dynamik	Holden Commodore VY	(Australia) Will Davison	DNF	49
2005	Brad Jones Racing	Ford Falcon BA	(United Kingdom) John Cleland	7th	159
2006	Brad Jones Racing	Ford Falcon BA	(New Zealand) Mark Porter† (Australia) Michael Caruso	DNF	59

† Porter was the entered driver but was killed in a support race. Caruso would replace him.

=== Supercars Championship results ===
(Races in bold indicate pole position) (Races in italics indicate fastest lap)

Supercars results
Year	Team	Car	1	2	3	4	5	6	7	8	9	10	11	12	13	14	15	16	17	18	19	20	21	22	23	24	25	26	27	28	29	30	31	32	33	34	Position	Points
2001	Harris Racing	Ford Falcon (AU)	PHI; R1	PHI; R2	ADE; R3	ADE; R4	EAS; R5	EAS; R6	HDV; R7	HDV; R8	HDV; R9	CAN; R10	CAN; R11	CAN; R12	BAR; R13	BAR; R14	BAR; R15	CAL; R16	CAL; R17	CAL; R18	ORA; R19	ORA; R20	QLD; R21; Ret	WIN; R22	WIN; R23	BAT; R24	PUK; R25	PUK; R26	PUK; R27	SAN; R28	SAN; R29	SAN; R30					51st	228
2001	Power Racing	Ford Falcon (AU)	PHI; R1	PHI; R2	ADE; R3	ADE; R4	EAS; R5	EAS; R6	HDV; R7	HDV; R8	HDV; R9	CAN; R10	CAN; R11	CAN; R12	BAR; R13	BAR; R14	BAR; R15	CAL; R16	CAL; R17	CAL; R18	ORA; R19	ORA; R20	QLD; R21	WIN; R22	WIN; R23	BAT; R24; 18	PUK; R25	PUK; R26	PUK; R27	SAN; R28	SAN; R29	SAN; R30					51st	228
2002	Briggs Motor Sport	Ford Falcon (AU)	ADE; R1	ADE; R2	PHI; R3	PHI; R4	EAS; R5	EAS; R6	EAS; R7	HDV; R8	HDV; R9	HDV; R10	CAN; R11	CAN; R12	CAN; R13	BAR; R14	BAR; R15	BAR; R16	ORA; R17	ORA; R18	WIN; R19	WIN; R20	QLD; R21; 19	BAT; R22; 17	SUR; R23	SUR; R24	PUK; R25	PUK; R26	PUK; R27	SAN; R28	SAN; R29						51st	60
2003	John Faulkner Racing	Holden Commodore (VX)	ADE; R1	ADE; R1	PHI; R3	EAS; R4	WIN; R5	BAR; R6	BAR; R7	BAR; R8	HDV; R9	HDV; R10	HDV; R11	QLD; R12	ORA; R13	SAN; R14; 24	BAT; R15; Ret	SUR; R16	SUR; R17	PUK; R18	PUK; R19	PUK; R20	EAS; R21	EAS; R22													63rd	100
2004	Team Dynamik	Holden Commodore (VY)	ADE; R1; Ret	ADE; R2; DNS	EAS; R3; 27	PUK; R4; 31	PUK; R5; Ret	PUK; R6; 29	HDV; R7; 28	HDV; R8; 29	HDV; R9; 28	BAR; R10; 26	BAR; R11; 24	BAR; R12; 28	QLD; R13; Ret	WIN; R14; 12	ORA; R15; 25	ORA; R16; 25	SAN; R17; Ret	BAT; R18; Ret	SUR; R19; Ret	SUR; R20; 24	SYM; R21; Ret	SYM; R22; 18	SYM; R23; 25	EAS; R24; 25	EAS; R25; 30	EAS; R26; 30									31st	393
2005	Brad Jones Racing	Ford Falcon (BA)	ADE; R1	ADE; R2	PUK; R3	PUK; R4	PUK; R5	BAR; R6	BAR; R7	BAR; R8	EAS; R9	EAS; R10	SHA; R11	SHA; R12	SHA; R13	HDV; R14	HDV; R15	HDV; R16	QLD; R17	ORA; R18	ORA; R19	SAN; R20; 21	BAT; R21; 7	SUR; R22	SUR; R23	SUR; R24	SYM; R25	SYM; R26	SYM; R27	PHI; R28	PHI; R29	PHI; R30					42nd	168
2006	Brad Jones Racing	Ford Falcon (BA)	ADE; R1	ADE; R2	PUK; R3	PUK; R4	PUK; R5	BAR; R6	BAR; R7	BAR; R8	WIN; R9	WIN; R10	WIN; R11	HDV; R12	HDV; R13	HDV; R14	QLD; R15	QLD; R16	QLD; R17	ORA; R18	ORA; R19	ORA; R20	SAN; R21; 18	BAT; R22; Ret	SUR; R23	SUR; R24	SUR; R25	SYM; R26	SYM; R27	SYM; R28	BHR; R29	BHR; R30	BHR; R31	PHI; R32	PHI; R33	PHI; R34	55th	150
