= Rodney Forbes =

Australian racing driver

- Nationality: Australian
- Born: 18 September 1967 (age 59) Sydney, New South Wales
- Relatives: Bob Forbes (father)

Supercars Championship
- Years active: 1999–2003
- Teams: Lansvale Racing Team; Gibson Motorsportt; 00 Motorsport
- Starts: 57
- Wins: 0
- Poles: 0
- Fastest laps: 0
- Best finish: 28th in 2000

Rodney Alexander Forbes (born 18 September 1967 in Sydney) is a former racing driver from Australia. He is best known for his participation in the V8 Supercars between 1999 and 2003.

Forbes also drove in GT endurance races like the 24 Hours of Spa, Bathurst 12 Hour and 24 Hours of Nürburgring. Recently he has done club racing in Australia.

== Career results ==
=== Career summary ===
Season	Series	Position	Car	Team
1997	Australian Formula Ford Championship	22nd	Van Diemen–Ford RF92	Rodney Forbes
1997	Australian Racing Drivers Club Formula Ford Championship	1st	Van Diemen–Ford RF92	Rodney Forbes
1998	Australian GT Production Car Championship	4th	Porsche 911 RSCS	Bob Forbes Racing
1999	V8 Supercar Championship Series	29th	Holden Commodore VS	Lansvale Racing Team
1999	V8 Supercar Privateers Cup	2nd	Holden Commodore VS	Lansvale Racing Team
2000	V8 Supercar Championship Series	28th	Holden Commodore VT	Gibson Motorsport
2001	V8 Supercar Championship Series	29th	Ford Falcon AU	Gibson Motorsport
2002	V8 Supercar Championship Series	30th	Ford Falcon AU	00 Motorsport
2003	V8 Supercar Championship Series	34th	Ford Falcon AU; Ford Falcon BA	00 Motorsport
2007	Porsche Carrera Cup Australia	13th	Porsche 911 GT3 Cup	Jaimie Vedda Racing
2008	Porsche Carrera Cup Australia	9th	Porsche 911 GT3 Cup	Jaimie Vedda Racing
2008	New Zealand GT3 Cup Challenge	4th	Porsche 997 GT3 Cup	Triple X Racing
2009	New Zealand GT3 Cup Challenge	5th	Porsche 997 GT3 Cup	MPD Dairy Products
2010	Australian GT3 Cup Challenge	29th	Porsche 997 GT3 Cup	MPD Dairy Products

=== Complete V8 Supercar results ===
V8 Supercars results
Year	Team	Car	1	2	3	4	5	6	7	8	9	10	11	12	13	14	15	16	17	18	19	20	21	22	23	24	25	26	27	28	29	30	31	32	33	Position	Points
1999	Bob Forbes Racing	Holden Commodore (VS)	EAS; R1; Ret	EAS; R2; 16	EAS; R3; 21	ADE; R4; 16	BAR; R5; 15	BAR; R6; 22	BAR; R7; Ret	PHI; R8; 17	PHI; R9; 30	PHI; R10; 19	HID; R11; 25	HID; R12; 21	HID; R13; Ret	SAN; R14; 26	SAN; R15; 18	SAN; R16; 20	QLD; R17; 20	QLD; R18; Ret	QLD; R19; 25	CAL; R20; 16	CAL; R21; Ret	CAL; R22; 22	SYM; R23; 13	SYM; R24; 22	SYM; R25; 17	WIN; R26; 26	WIN; R27; 33	WIN; R28; 27	ORA; R29; Ret	ORA; R30; 27	ORA; R31; 25	QLD; R32; Ret	BAT; R33; 12	29th	423
2000	Bob Forbes Racing	Holden Commodore (VT)	PHI; R1; 7	PHI; R2; Ret	BAR; R3; 24	BAR; R4; 23	BAR; R5; 27	ADE; R6; Ret	ADE; R7; Ret	EAS; R8; 16	EAS; R9; 31	EAS; R10; 18	HID; R11; 17	HID; R12; Ret	HID; R13; Ret	CAN; R14; 24	CAN; R15; 23	CAN; R16; Ret	QLD; R17; 23	QLD; R18; 27	QLD; R19; 27	WIN; R20; 12	WIN; R21; 11	WIN; R22; 15	ORA; R23; 29	ORA; R24; 17	ORA; R25; 15	CAL; R26; 24	CAL; R27; 27	CAL; R28; 18	QLD; R29; 14	SAN; R30; Ret	SAN; R31; 26	SAN; R32; 22	BAT; R33; Ret	28th	183
2001	Gibson Motorsport	Ford Falcon (AU)	PHI; R1; 23	PHI; R2; 21	ADE; R3; Ret	ADE; R4; Ret	EAS; R5; DNS	EAS; R6; DNS	HDV; R7; 25	HDV; R8; 19	HDV; R9; 21	CAN; R10; 23	CAN; R11; 10	CAN; R12; 14	BAR; R13; 24	BAR; R14; 21	BAR; R15; 19	CAL; R16; 15	CAL; R17; 17	CAL; R18; 28	ORA; R19; 18	ORA; R20; 25	QLD; R21; Ret	WIN; R22; Ret	WIN; R23; 27	BAT; R24; 21	PUK; R25; 14	PUK; R26; 13	PUK; R27; 14	SAN; R28; 24	SAN; R29; 19	SAN; R30; 21				29th	853
2002	00 Motorsport	Ford Falcon (AU)	ADE; R1; 13	ADE; R2; 20	PHI; R3; Ret	PHI; R4; Ret	EAS; R5; 29	EAS; R6; 28	EAS; R7; 28	HDV; R8; 32	HDV; R9; Ret	HDV; R10; DNS	CAN; R11; 24	CAN; R12; Ret	CAN; R13; DNS	BAR; R14; 29	BAR; R15; 11	BAR; R16; 26	ORA; R17; Ret	ORA; R18; 22	WIN; R19; 16	WIN; R20; 15	QLD; R21; 12	BAT; R22; 14	SUR; R23; 27	SUR; R24; 23	PUK; R25; 27	PUK; R26; 15	PUK; R27; Ret	SAN; R28; 26	SAN; R29; 15					30th	337
2003	00 Motorsport	Ford Falcon (BA)	ADE; R1; 25	ADE; R1; 21	PHI; R3; 27	EAS; R4; 25	WIN; R5; DSQ	BAR; R6; 23	BAR; R7; 25	BAR; R8; 28	HDV; R9; 21	HDV; R10; 28	HDV; R11; 26	QLD; R12	ORA; R13	SAN; R14	BAT; R15	SUR; R16	SUR; R17	PUK; R18	PUK; R19	PUK; R20	EAS; R21	EAS; R22												34th	238

=== Complete Bathurst 1000 results ===
Year	Team	Car	Co-driver	Position	Laps
1998	Rod Wilson Racing	BMW 318i	(Australia) Rod Wilson	8th	152
1999	Lansvale Racing Team	Holden Commodore VS	(Australia) Geoff Full	12th	156
2000	Gibson Motorsport	Holden Commodore VT	(United Kingdom) John Cleland	DNF	78
2001	Gibson Motorsport	Ford Falcon AU	(Australia) David Parsons	21st	132
2002	00 Motorsport	Ford Falcon AU	(Australia) Neal Bates	14th	159

=== Complete Spa 24 Hours results ===
Year	Team	Co-drivers	Car	Class	Laps	Overall position	Class position
2008	(Australia) Juniper Racing	(Australia) Shaun Juniper (Australia) Max Twigg (New Zealand) Craig Baird	Porsche 997 GT3 Cup S	GT2	472	19th	9th
2009	(Belgium) Mühlner Motorsport	(Belgium) Christian Lefort (Belgium) François Verbist	Porsche 997 GT3 Cup S	G3	517	9th	3rd

=== Complete Bathurst 12 Hour results ===
Year	Team	Co-drivers	Car	Class	Laps	Overall position	Class position
2009	(Australia) Wilson Brothers Racing	(Australia) Lee Castle (New Zealand) Craig Baird	Subaru Impreza WRX	C	65	DNF	

=== Complete Nürburgring 24 Hours results ===
Year	Team	Co-drivers	Car	Class	Laps	Overall position	Class position
2009	(Germany) MSC Adenau	(Germany) Jörg Viebahn (Netherlands) Duncan Huisman (Germany) Marko Hartung	BMW E46 M3 GTS	SP7	77	DNF	
2010	(Germany) Scuderia Offenbach	(Germany) Matthias Weiland (Germany) Kai Riemer (Germany) David Horn	Porsche 997 GT3 Cup	SP7	?	?	2nd
2011	(Germany) Scuderia Offenbach	(Germany) René Bourdeaux (Ukraine) Oleksiy Kikireshko (Luxembourg) Antoine Feidt	Porsche 997 GT3 Cup	SP7	145	19th	3rd
2012	(Germany) Horn Motorsport	(Germany) David Horn (Germany) Chris Zochling (Germany) Guido Wirtz	Porsche 997 GT3 Cup	SP7	84	DNF	
2013	(Netherlands) Raceunion Teichmann Racing	(Netherlands) Jos Menton (Netherlands) Stefan Landman (Netherlands) Stef Van Campenhoud	Porsche 911 GT3 Cup	SP7	84	14th	3rd
