= 2002 Boost Mobile V8 International =

2002 Supercar Championship event

(New Zealand) 2002 Boost Mobile V8 International
Event Information
- Round 12 of 13 in the 2002 V8 Supercar Championship Series
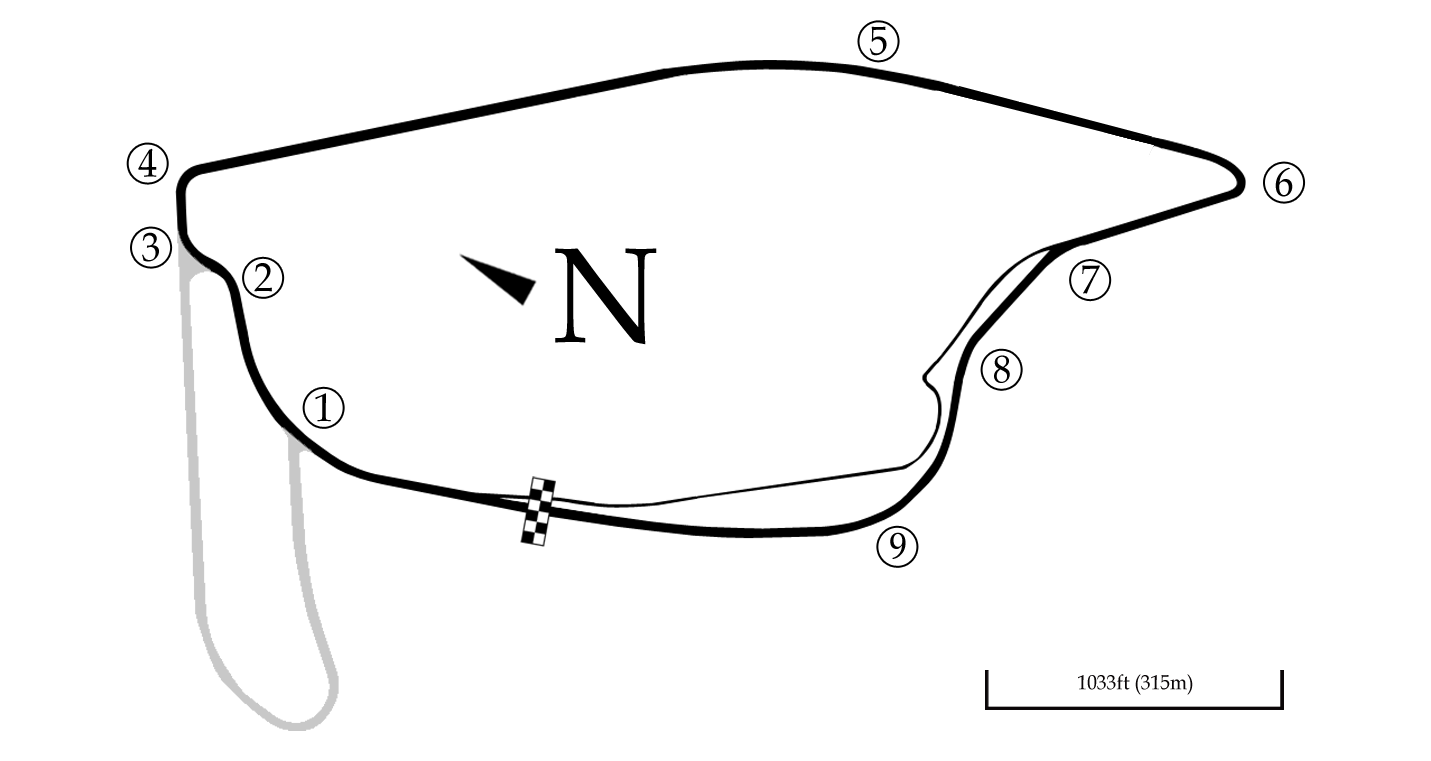
- Date: 8–10 November 2002
- Location: Pukekohe, New Zealand
- Venue: Pukekohe Park Raceway
- Weather: Friday: Overcast; Saturday: Overcast; Sunday: Sunny

Results
Race 1
Distance	36 laps	100 km
Pole position	Mark Skaife; Holden Racing Team	57.1672
Winner	Mark Skaife; Holden Racing Team	41:28.6114
Race 2
Distance	54 laps	150 km
Winner	Greg Murphy; Tom Walkinshaw Racing Australia	57:56.5579
Race 3
Distance	54 laps	150 km
Winner	Todd Kelly; Tom Walkinshaw Racing Australia	1:10:49.8778
Round Results
First	Greg Murphy; Tom Walkinshaw Racing Australia	186 pts
Second	Todd Kelly; Tom Walkinshaw Racing Australia	157 pts
Third	Marcos Ambrose; Stone Brothers Racing	125 pts

The 2002 Boost Mobile V8 International was the twelfth round of the 2002 V8 Supercar Championship Series. It was held on the weekend of 8 to 10 November at Pukekohe Park Raceway in New Zealand.

The event was won by Greg Murphy for the second time in succession after rivals Mark Skaife and Marcos Ambrose incurred problems that dropped them out of contention. Teammate Todd Kelly completed a one-two for Tom Walkinshaw Racing Australia for the round whilst Ambrose rounded up the top three in overall points. Despite claiming pole position and winning the first race, series champion Mark Skaife was beset with engine issues over the last two races, eliminating him from round honours.

This was the last Pukekohe V8 Supercar event to be sponsored by Boost Mobile. From 2003 onwards, the vacancy was taken over by hardware company, PlaceMakers.

== Background ==
Mark Skaife entered the event having already wrapped up the championship two rounds prior at the Bathurst 1000. Contention for second in the championship was still raging between Ambrose, Murphy and Jason Bright.

Preceding this event, Greg Murphy had remained undefeated at this circuit, in terms of qualifying, races and overall round points. The first instance being in the non-championship 1996 Mobil New Zealand Sprints and the other being in the inaugural championship event in 2001.

Dean Canto would replace Greg Ritter at Briggs Motorsport, taking over the drive for the remainder of the 2002 season.

== Race report ==
=== Qualifying ===
Pos	No	Name	Team	Vehicle	Time
1	1	(Australia) Mark Skaife	Holden Racing Team	Holden Commodore (VX)	0:57.1446
2	4	(Australia) Marcos Ambrose	Stone Brothers Racing	Ford Falcon (AU)	0:57.3561
3	2	(Australia) Jason Bright	Holden Racing Team	Holden Commodore (VX)	0:57.3679
4	51	(New Zealand) Greg Murphy	Tom Walkinshaw Racing Australia	Holden Commodore (VX)	0:57.5348
5	9	(Australia) David Besnard	Stone Brothers Racing	Ford Falcon (AU)	0:57.5556
6	66	(Australia) Tony Longhurst	Briggs Motorsport	Ford Falcon (AU)	0:57.6650
7	65	(Brazil) Max Wilson	Briggs Motorsport	Ford Falcon (AU)	0:57.7146
8	16	(New Zealand) Steven Richards	Perkins Engineering	Holden Commodore (VX)	0:57.7293
9	21	(Australia) Brad Jones	Brad Jones Racing	Ford Falcon (AU)	0:57.7573
10	15	(Australia) Todd Kelly	Tom Walkinshaw Racing Australia	Holden Commodore (VX)	0:57.7860
11	02	(Australia) Rick Kelly	Holden Young Lions	Holden Commodore (VX)	0:57.8044
12	00	(Australia) Craig Lowndes	00 Motorsport	Ford Falcon (AU)	0:57.8427
13	34	(Australia) Garth Tander	Garry Rogers Motorsport	Holden Commodore (VX)	0:57.8550
14	11	(Australia) Larry Perkins	Perkins Engineering	Holden Commodore (VX)	0:57.9156
15	888	(Australia) John Bowe	Brad Jones Racing	Ford Falcon (AU)	0:57.9208
16	7	(Australia) Rodney Forbes	00 Motorsport	Ford Falcon (AU)	0:57.9252
17	8	(Australia) Russell Ingall	Perkins Engineering	Holden Commodore (VX)	0:57.9561
18	3	(Australia) Cameron McConville	Lansvale Racing Team	Holden Commodore (VX)	0:58.0208
19	17	(Australia) Steven Johnson	Dick Johnson Racing	Ford Falcon (AU)	0:58.0441
20	18	(New Zealand) Paul Radisich	Dick Johnson Racing	Ford Falcon (AU)	0:58.0625
21	31	(Australia) Steven Ellery	Steven Ellery Racing	Ford Falcon (AU)	0:58.0797
22	54	(New Zealand) Craig Baird	Rod Nash Racing	Holden Commodore (VX)	0:58.1064
23	021	(New Zealand) Jason Richards	Team Kiwi Racing	Holden Commodore (VX)	0:58.1131
24	43	(Australia) Paul Weel	Paul Weel Racing	Ford Falcon (AU)	0:58.2112
25	75	(Australia) Anthony Tratt	Paul Little Racing	Ford Falcon (AU)	0:58.2274
26	46	(New Zealand) John Faulkner	John Faulkner Racing	Holden Commodore (VX)	0:58.2312
27	27	(Australia) Neil Crompton	00 Motorsport	Ford Falcon (AU)	0:58.2816
28	5	(Australia) Glenn Seton	Glenn Seton Racing	Ford Falcon (AU)	0:58.2933
29	35	(Australia) Jason Bargwanna	Garry Rogers Motorsport	Holden Commodore (VX)	0:58.3463
30	600	(Australia) Dean Canto	Briggs Motor Sport	Ford Falcon (AU)	0:58.4228
31	10	(Australia) Mark Larkham	Larkham Motor Sport	Ford Falcon (AU)	0:58.4894
32	40	(Australia) Cameron McLean	Paragon Motorsport	Ford Falcon (AU)	0:58.8199

=== Top Ten Shootout ===
Pos	No	Name	Team	Vehicle	Time
1	1	(Australia) Mark Skaife	Holden Racing Team	Holden Commodore (VX)	0:57.1672
2	9	(Australia) David Besnard	Stone Brothers Racing	Ford Falcon (AU)	0:57.4253
3	51	(New Zealand) Greg Murphy	Tom Walkinshaw Racing Australia	Holden Commodore (VX)	0:57.4705
4	4	(Australia) Marcos Ambrose	Stone Brothers Racing	Ford Falcon (AU)	0:57.5351
5	2	(Australia) Jason Bright	Holden Racing Team	Holden Commodore (VX)	0:57.7704
6	15	(Australia) Todd Kelly	Tom Walkinshaw Racing Australia	Holden Commodore (VX)	0:57.9209
7	16	(New Zealand) Steven Richards	Perkins Engineering	Holden Commodore (VX)	0:57.9791
8	21	(Australia) Brad Jones	Brad Jones Racing	Ford Falcon (AU)	0:58.0312
9	66	(Australia) Tony Longhurst	Briggs Motorsport	Ford Falcon (AU)	0:58.0875
10	65	(Brazil) Max Wilson	Briggs Motorsport	Ford Falcon (AU)	0:58.3566

=== Race 1 ===
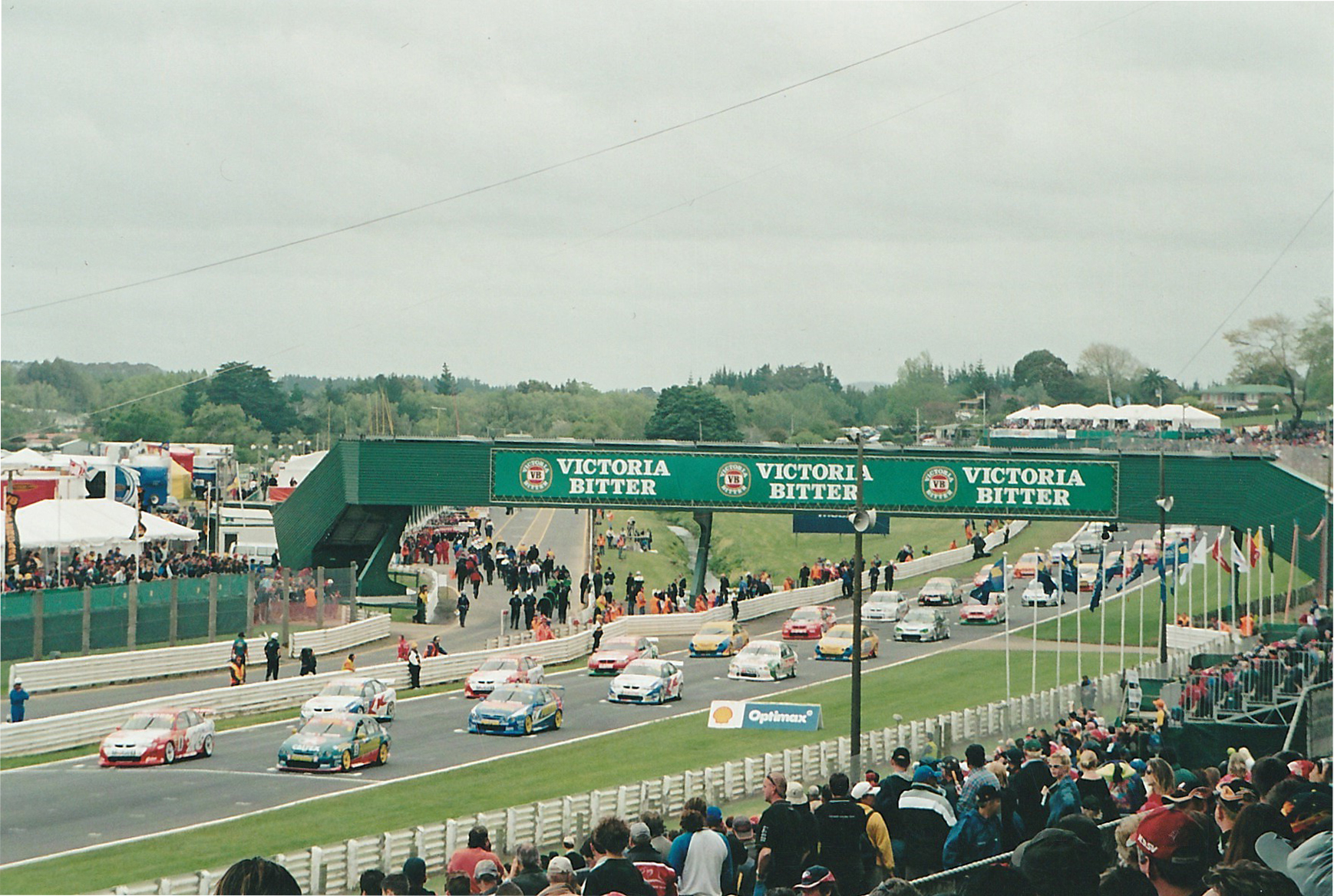
The start of the first race of the 2002 Boost Mobile V8 International

Drama unfolded almost immediately as the two Dick Johnson Racing cars driven by Paul Radisich and Steven Johnson collided on the approach to turn one. The incident resulted in both cars immediately dropping out of the race and with Radisich's car stranded on the side of the track, the safety car was deployed. Once the race resumed, Skaife led the race from David Besnard, Murphy, Ambrose, Bright, Todd Kelly, Steven Richards and Brad Jones. Skaife began to set a scorching pace, eventually breaking the track record multiple times over the course of the race.

By lap 8, multiple cars down the pack opted to complete their compulsory pit stops. A slow stop for Besnard would prove to be costly, being dropped out of the top ten. Cameron McConville's race was over when his engine expired at the pitlane exit On lap 15, Larry Perkins retired from the race after the power steering pump had failed. Garth Tander's race was over on lap 22 owing to a front-right suspension failure. Rodney Forbes spun off at the hairpin, hitting the tyre barrier in the process. But was able to continue the race.

Up the front, Skaife remained untroubled throughout the entire race. In taking victory, he became the first driver to defeat Murphy at Pukekohe Park Raceway in a V8 Supercar race. Murphy and Ambrose rounded out the podium.

Pos	No	Name	Team	Laps	Time / Retired	Grid
1	1	(Australia) Mark Skaife	Holden Racing Team	36	41min 28.6114sec	1
2	51	(New Zealand) Greg Murphy	Tom Walkinshaw Racing Australia	36	+ 5.132	3
3	4	(Australia) Marcos Ambrose	Stone Brothers Racing	36	+ 6.409	4
4	2	(Australia) Jason Bright	Holden Racing Team	36	+ 6.860	5
5	15	(Australia) Todd Kelly	Tom Walkinshaw Racing Australia	36	+ 11.569	6
6	16	(New Zealand) Steven Richards	Perkins Engineering	36	+ 12.503	7
7	02	(Australia) Rick Kelly	Holden Young Lions	36	+ 13.599	11
8	00	(Australia) Craig Lowndes	00 Motorsport	36	+ 21.570	12
9	21	(Australia) Brad Jones	Brad Jones Racing	36	+ 24.249	8
10	8	(Australia) Russell Ingall	Perkins Engineering	36	+ 24.849	17
11	65	(Brazil) Max Wilson	Briggs Motorsport	36	+ 27.298	10
12	888	(Australia) John Bowe	Brad Jones Racing	36	+ 27.690	15
13	9	(Australia) David Besnard	Stone Brothers Racing	36	+ 31.478	2
14	66	(Australia) Tony Longhurst	Briggs Motorsport	36	+ 36.309	9
15	27	(Australia) Neil Crompton	00 Motorsport	36	+ 36.644	27
16	021	(New Zealand) Jason Richards	Team Kiwi Racing	36	+ 37.144	23
17	31	(Australia) Steven Ellery	Steven Ellery Racing	36	+ 49.253	21
18	54	(New Zealand) Craig Baird	Rod Nash Racing	36	+ 53.254	22
19	35	(Australia) Jason Bargwanna	Garry Rogers Motorsport	36	+ 54.964	29
20	46	(New Zealand) John Faulkner	John Faulkner Racing	36	+ 55.342	26
21	43	(Australia) Paul Weel	Paul Weel Racing	36	+ 55.379	24
22	40	(Australia) Cameron McLean	Paragon Motorsport	36	+ 58.302	32
23	10	(Australia) Mark Larkham	Larkham Motor Sport	35	+ 1 lap	31
24	600	(Australia) Dean Canto	Briggs Motorsport	35	+ 1 lap	30
25	75	(Australia) Anthony Tratt	Paul Little Racing	35	+ 1 lap	25
26	5	(Australia) Glenn Seton	Glenn Seton Racing	35	+ 1 lap	28
27	7	(Australia) Rodney Forbes	00 Motorsport	32	+ 4 laps	16
Ret	34	(Australia) Garth Tander	Garry Rogers Motorsport	19	Suspension	13
Ret	11	(Australia) Larry Perkins	Perkins Engineering	15	Power steering	14
Ret	3	(Australia) Cameron McConville	Lansvale Racing Team	6	Engine	18
Ret	17	(Australia) Steven Johnson	Dick Johnson Racing	0	Accident damage	19
Ret	18	(New Zealand) Paul Radisich	Dick Johnson Racing	0	Accident	20
Fastest Lap: Mark Skaife (Holden Racing Team), 0:57.4545

=== Race 2 ===
Ambrose bogged down off the start and dropped from third to sixth. A concertina effect on the opening lap heading into the hairpin saw Russell Ingall spin Craig Lowndes, sending the 00 Motorsport driver right to the tail end of the pack. Besnard was forced into the pits early on after his Falcon was stuck in gear and subsequently dropped two laps behind the leaders.

On lap 20, Cameron McLean's right-rear wheel parted company with his car whilst Canto veered off into the runoff area at the hairpin. He was joined by Perkins and subsequently resulted in a safety car. During this time, Skaife's car developed a misfire. As the race resumed, Skaife peeled into the pits to retire; handing the lead over to Murphy. Steven Richards struggled with tyres and dropped off the podium as the race tracked on.

Murphy held the lead until the very end. Taking the win ahead of Bright and Ambrose.

Pos	No	Name	Team	Laps	Time / Retired	Grid
1	51	(New Zealand) Greg Murphy	Tom Walkinshaw Racing Australia	54	57min 56.5579sec	2
2	2	(Australia) Jason Bright	Holden Racing Team	54	+ 3.512	4
3	4	(Australia) Marcos Ambrose	Stone Brothers Racing	54	+ 11.589	3
4	15	(Australia) Todd Kelly	Tom Walkinshaw Racing Australia	54	+ 13.804	5
5	02	(Australia) Rick Kelly	Holden Young Lions	54	+ 18.751	7
6	16	(New Zealand) Steven Richards	Perkins Engineering	54	+ 20.583	6
7	27	(Australia) Neil Crompton	00 Motorsport	54	+ 23.937	15
8	17	(Australia) Steven Johnson	Dick Johnson Racing	54	+ 24.661	31
9	00	(Australia) Craig Lowndes	00 Motorsport	54	+ 28.823	8
10	66	(Australia) Tony Longhurst	Briggs Motorsport	54	+ 29.592	14
11	8	(Australia) Russell Ingall	Perkins Engineering	54	+ 30.189	10
12	31	(Australia) Steven Ellery	Steven Ellery Racing	54	+ 30.627	17
13	21	(Australia) Brad Jones	Brad Jones Racing	54	+ 31.622	9
14	021	(New Zealand) Jason Richards	Team Kiwi Racing	54	+ 35.325	16
15	7	(Australia) Rodney Forbes	00 Motorsport	54	+ 42.069	27
16	65	(Brazil) Max Wilson	Briggs Motorsport	54	+ 43.940	11
17	10	(Australia) Mark Larkham	Larkham Motor Sport	54	+ 51.169	23
18	3	(Australia) Cameron McConville	Lansvale Racing Team	54	+ 52.876	30
19	35	(Australia) Jason Bargwanna	Garry Rogers Motorsport	54	+ 56.053	19
20	888	(Australia) John Bowe	Brad Jones Racing	53	+ 1 lap	12
21	43	(Australia) Paul Weel	Paul Weel Racing	53	+ 1 lap	21
22	75	(Australia) Anthony Tratt	Paul Little Racing	53	+ 1 lap	25
23	9	(Australia) David Besnard	Stone Brothers Racing	52	+ 2 laps	13
24	5	(Australia) Glenn Seton	Glenn Seton Racing	52	+ 2 laps	26
25	600	(Australia) Dean Canto	Briggs Motorsport	51	+ 3 laps	24
Ret	34	(Australia) Garth Tander	Garry Rogers Motorsport	41	Fuel pump	28
Ret	46	(New Zealand) John Faulkner	John Faulkner Racing	26	Retired	20
Ret	1	(Australia) Mark Skaife	Holden Racing Team	24	Engine	1
Ret	11	(Australia) Larry Perkins	Perkins Engineering	20	Spun off	29
Ret	40	(Australia) Cameron McLean	Paragon Motorsport	20	Wheel	22
Ret	54	(New Zealand) Craig Baird	Rod Nash Racing	0	Retired	18
WD	18	(New Zealand) Paul Radisich	Dick Johnson Racing		Withdrawn	
Fastest Lap: Mark Skaife (Holden Racing Team), 0.57.9281

=== Race 3 ===
Before the race, question marks lingered over whether the Holden Racing Team could rectify Skaife's engine issues to allow him to line up on the grid. Eventually, he would. Although these issues would resurface as the race went on. Todd Kelly perfected his launch off the line and shuffled into second behind Murphy off the start. Behind them, others were less-than-perfect. Jason Richards t-boned Brad Jones in turn two, sending them both into a spin and tumbling down the order. The safety car was brought out on lap 17 after McConville spun off at the hairpin. Not long after the race resumed, Bright's engine blew up on the back straight, making it a double-DNF for the Holden Racing Team.

By mid-race distance, Glenn Seton spun at turn two, taking out the tyre bundle in the process. This exposed a sharp bracket that was holding the bundle in place and multiple drivers began to experience punctures. One of them was race and round leader, Murphy. On lap 33, Murphy was forced to pit as a result, giving the lead to Ambrose, who also assumed the lead for round points as a result. The damage for Murphy was mitigated thanks to the deployment of another safety car after Besnard hit the wall at Ford Mountain. The safety car came out for the third time just a few laps later when Steven Richards went off the circuit at turn three.

When the race resumed with seven laps remaining, Todd Kelly began to exert pressure onto Ambrose. It appeared as if the Tasmanian had everything under control. But with three laps to go, he locked up massively into the hairpin; destroying the tyre and dropping him out of the lead. He would limp around to the finish line to pick up valuable points for the championship. Todd Kelly cruised to victory while brother Rick and Larry Perkins squabbled for the podium. Perkins would end up prevailing for second while Rick Kelly finished third. Finishing fourth, Murphy took the overall round honours, keeping up his undefeated round record at Pukekohe. This race also marked the last podium appearance in V8 Supercars for Larry Perkins.

Pos	No	Name	Team	Laps	Time / Retired	Grid
1	15	(Australia) Todd Kelly	Tom Walkinshaw Racing Australia	54	1hr 10min 49.8778sec	4
2	11	(Australia) Larry Perkins	Perkins Engineering	54	+ 0.669	29
3	02	(Australia) Rick Kelly	Holden Young Lions	54	+ 1.640	5
4	51	(New Zealand) Greg Murphy	Tom Walkinshaw Racing Australia	54	+ 2.672	1
5	600	(Australia) Dean Canto	Briggs Motorsport	54	+ 5.955	25
6	43	(Australia) Paul Weel	Paul Weel Racing	54	+ 6.542	21
7	21	(Australia) Brad Jones	Brad Jones Racing	54	+ 8.203	13
8	40	(Australia) Cameron McLean	Paragon Motorsport	54	+ 19.437	30
9	65	(Brazil) Max Wilson	Briggs Motorsport	54	+ 20.244	16
10	4	(Australia) Marcos Ambrose	Stone Brothers Racing	54	+ 1:10.890	3
11	8	(Australia) Russell Ingall	Perkins Engineering	53	+ 1 lap	11
12	35	(Australia) Jason Bargwanna	Garry Rogers Motorsport	53	+ 1 lap	19
13	66	(Australia) Tony Longhurst	Briggs Motorsport	53	+ 1 lap	10
14	34	(Australia) Garth Tander	Garry Rogers Motorsport	52	+ 2 laps	26
15	27	(Australia) Neil Crompton	00 Motorsport	52	+ 2 laps	7
16	75	(Australia) Anthony Tratt	Paul Little Racing	52	+ 2 laps	22
17	5	(Australia) Glenn Seton	Glenn Seton Racing	51	+ 3 laps	24
18	16	(New Zealand) Steven Richards	Perkins Engineering	51	+ 3 laps	6
Ret	17	(Australia) Steven Johnson	Dick Johnson Racing	53	Suspension	8
Ret	888	(Australia) John Bowe	Brad Jones Racing	49	Accident	20
Ret	46	(New Zealand) John Faulkner	John Faulkner Racing	48	Suspension	27
Ret	54	(New Zealand) Craig Baird	Rod Nash Racing	47	Accident	31
Ret	9	(Australia) David Besnard	Stone Brothers Racing	31	Accident	23
Ret	10	(Australia) Mark Larkham	Larkham Motor Sport	29	Retired	17
Ret	7	(Australia) Rodney Forbes	00 Motorsport	28	Retired	15
Ret	2	(Australia) Jason Bright	Holden Racing Team	25	Engine	2
Ret	3	(Australia) Cameron McConville	Lansvale Racing Team	17	Spun off	18
Ret	00	(Australia) Craig Lowndes	00 Motorsport	16	Engine	9
Ret	1	(Australia) Mark Skaife	Holden Racing Team	13	Engine	28
Ret	31	(Australia) Steven Ellery	Steven Ellery Racing	8	Radiator	12
Ret	021	(New Zealand) Jason Richards	Team Kiwi Racing	0	Accident	14
WD	18	(New Zealand) Paul Radisich	Dick Johnson Racing		Withdrawn	
Fastest Lap: Greg Murphy (Tom Walkinshaw Racing Australia), 0:57.9784

== Gallery ==
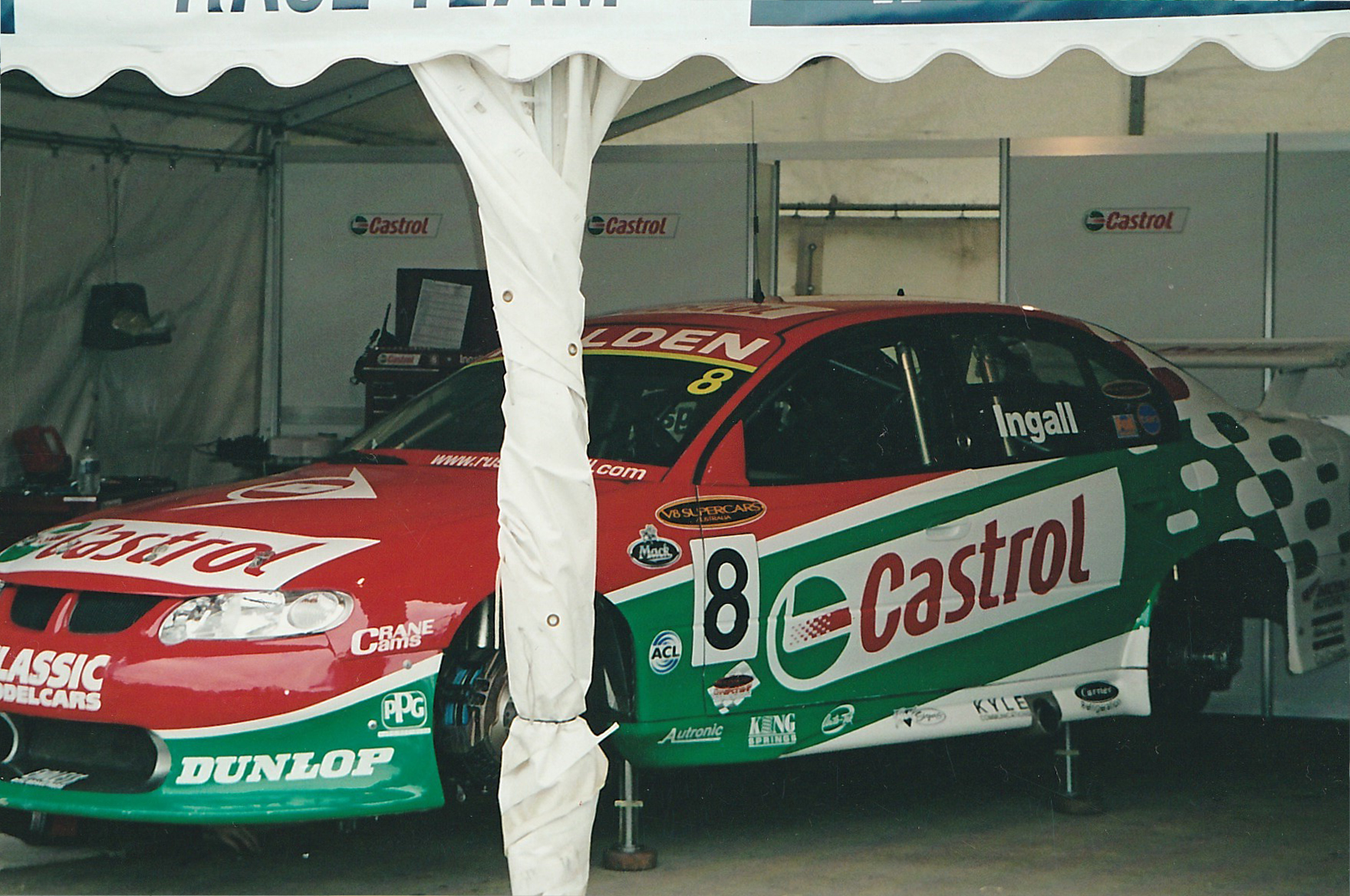
Russell Ingall's Castrol Perkins car in the garage

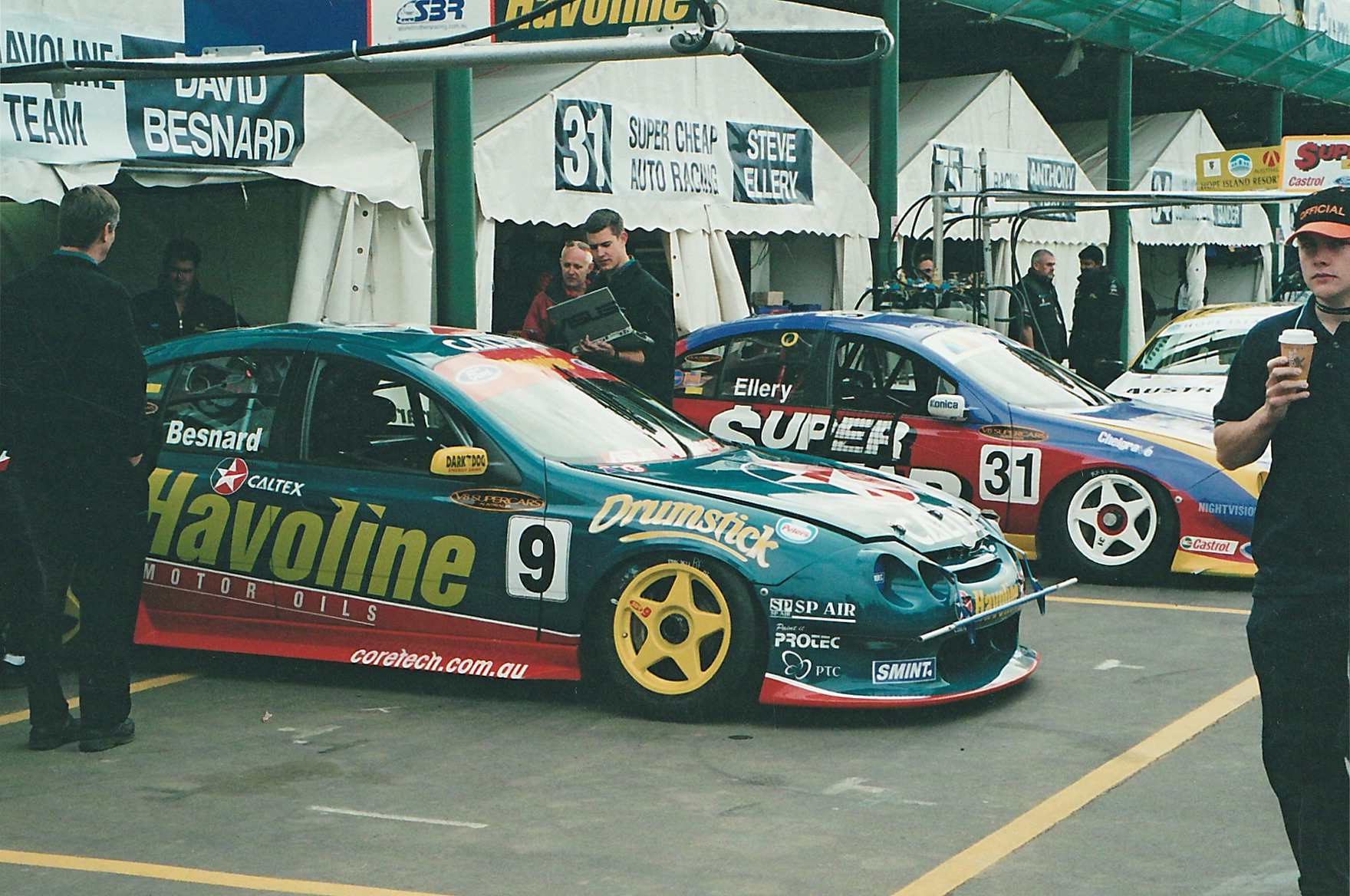
David Besnard and Steven Ellery in the pitlane

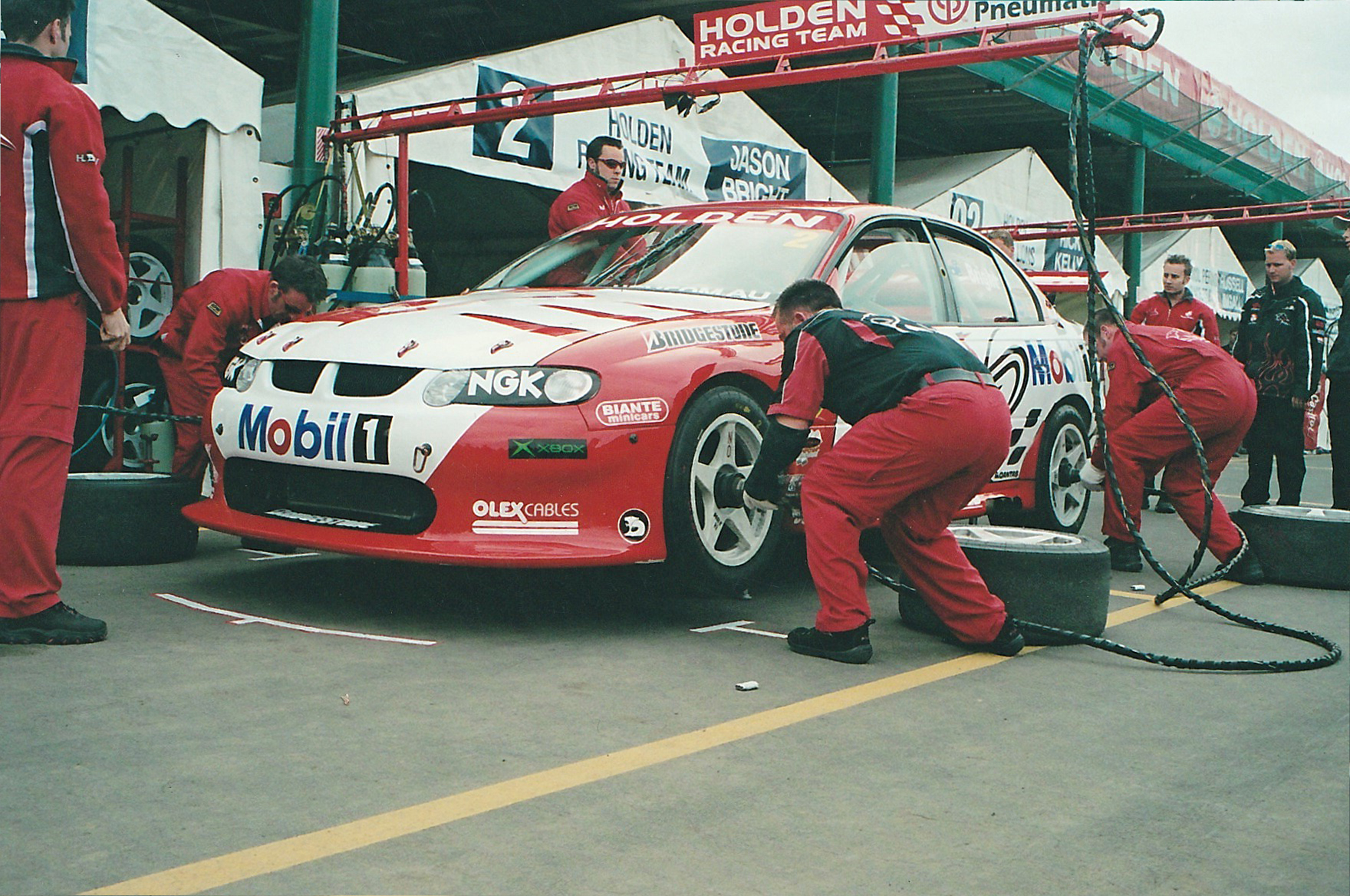
Jason Bright undertaking a pitstop

== Aftermath ==
=== Championship standings ===
Pos.	No	Driver	Team	Pts
1	1	(Australia) Mark Skaife	Holden Racing Team	2064
2	51	(New Zealand) Greg Murphy	Tom Walkinshaw Racing Australia	1403
3	2	(Australia) Jason Bright	Holden Racing Team	1376
4	15	(Australia) Todd Kelly	Tom Walkinshaw Racing Australia	1303
5	16	(New Zealand) Steven Richards	Perkins Engineering	1278
