= 2002 Adelaide 500 =

2002 Supercar Championship event

(South Australia) 2002 Adelaide 500
Event Information
- Round 1 of 13 in the 2002 V8 Supercar Championship Series
- Date: 15–17 March 2002
- Location: Adelaide, South Australia
- Venue: Adelaide Street Circuit
- Weather: Sunny

Results
Race 1
Distance	78 laps	250 km
Pole position	Mark Skaife; Holden Racing Team	1:22.7698
Winner	Mark Skaife; Holden Racing Team	2:05:33.3660
Race 2
Distance	78 laps	250 km
Winner	Mark Skaife; Holden Racing Team	2:05:03.9534
Round Results
First	Mark Skaife; Holden Racing Team	400 pts
Second	Greg Murphy; Tom Walkinshaw Racing Australia	288 pts
Third	Steven Richards; Perkins Engineering	208 pts

The 2002 Adelaide 500 (known for naming rights reasons as the 2002 Clipsal 500 Adelaide) was the fourth running of the Adelaide 500 race. It was the opening round of the 2002 V8 Supercar Championship Series and was held from March 15 to 17, 2002.

The weekend was dominated by the Holden Racing Team outfit. In particular, defending champion Mark Skaife claimed pole position and won both races. Teammate Jason Bright also exhibited strong pace and had led the first race until a handful laps remaining when he made contact with the wall, damaged his rear suspension and forced him out of the race.

This year saw the introduction of the new 'sweeper' configuration at turn eight. The new addition would become of the most challenging and feared corners in Australian motorsport.

== Background ==
The format, unique to V8 Supercars, and loosely similar to the Pukekohe 500 format, splits the 500 kilometre event into two separate 250 kilometre-races, each held on a different day. Points were assigned separately to the races, with Race 2 paying double points over Race 1 (180 points for a win in Race 1 and 360 points for a win in Race 2), and they combined to award a round result. The defending event winner from 2001 was Jason Bright of the Holden Racing Team.

Following a spate of incidents over the previous two events, the turn eight chicane had been altered into a sweeper for the 2002 event. The corner would be taken in sixth gear with little in the way of lifting and would become a staple of the circuits characteristics for years to come.

=== Entry list ===
On the run-up to the event, the rising popularity of the category led to an influx of entries that the paddock could not accommodate. As a result, pre-qualifying would take place at the nearby Mallala Motor Sport Park with 41 drivers vying for 36 allocated spots on the grid. Those who failed to qualify included Tomas Mezera for Imrie Motorsport, Greg Crick and Ross Halliday for Halliday Motorsports, and Dugal McDougall for his privateer outfit.

Trevor Ashby took part in official practice for pre-qualifying but did not partake in qualifying itself. As a result, this gave Ashby his 60th and final V8 Supercar entry.

== Race report ==
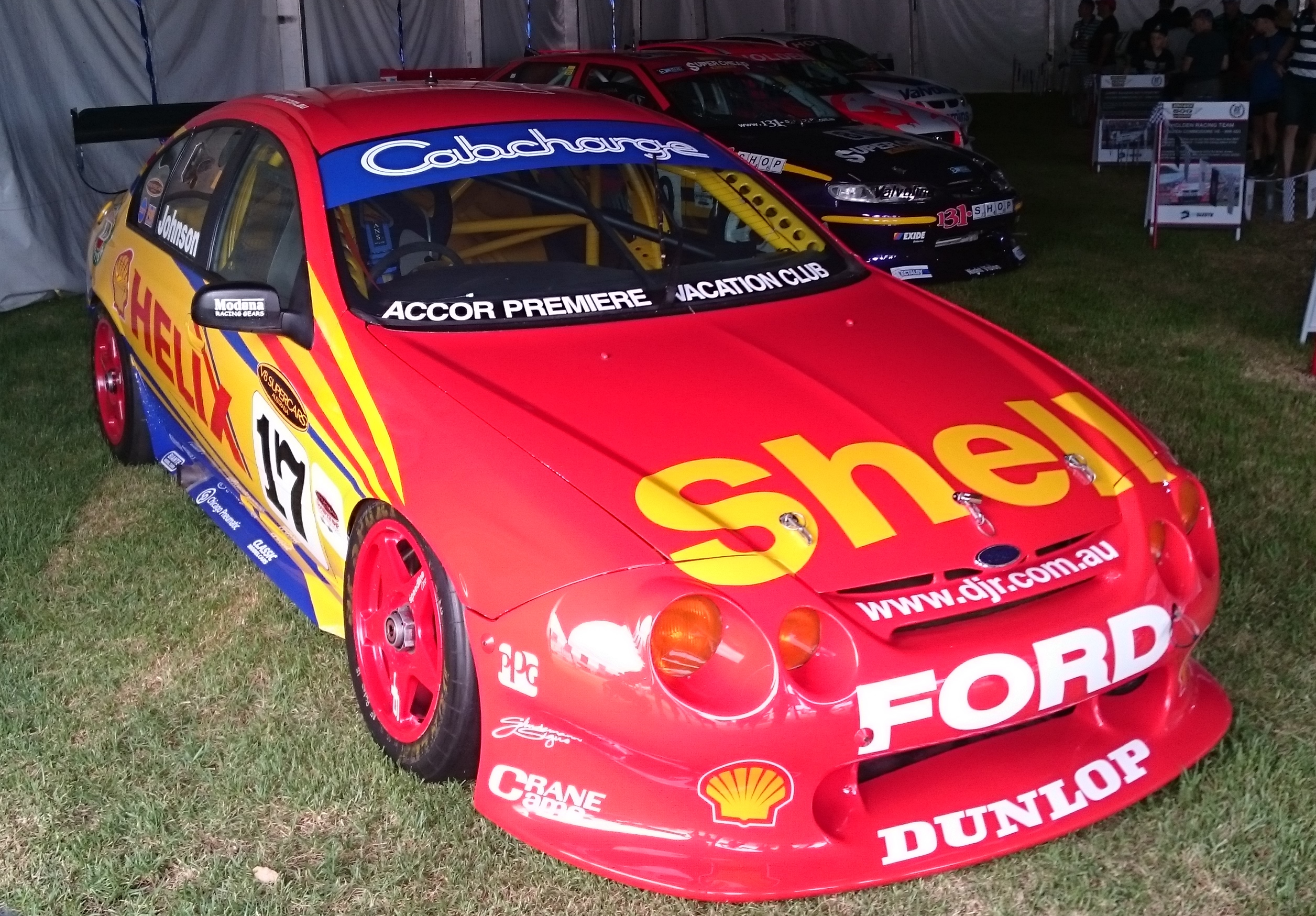
The Ford Falcon AU with which Steven Johnson contested the 2002 Adelaide 500. The car is pictured in 2018

=== Qualifying ===
Pos	No	Driver	Team	Car	Time
1	1	(Australia) Mark Skaife	Holden Racing Team	Holden Commodore (VX)	1:22.1273
2	2	(Australia) Jason Bright	Holden Racing Team	Holden Commodore (VX)	1:22.1829
3	51	(New Zealand) Greg Murphy	Tom Walkinshaw Racing Australia	Holden Commodore (VX)	1:22.2803
4	16	(New Zealand) Steven Richards	Perkins Engineering	Holden Commodore (VX)	1:22.6620
5	65	(Brazil) Max Wilson	Briggs Motorsport	Ford Falcon (AU)	1:22.8995
6	888	(Australia) John Bowe	Brad Jones Racing	Ford Falcon (AU)	1:22.9192
7	17	(Australia) Steven Johnson	Dick Johnson Racing	Ford Falcon (AU)	1:22.9776
8	00	(Australia) Craig Lowndes	00 Motorsport	Ford Falcon (AU)	1:23.0312
9	600	(New Zealand) Simon Wills	Briggs Motorsport	Ford Falcon (AU)	1:23.0439
10	8	(Australia) Russell Ingall	Perkins Engineering	Holden Commodore (VX)	1:23.0692
11	34	(Australia) Garth Tander	Garry Rogers Motorsport	Holden Commodore (VX)	1:23.0984
12	4	(Australia) Marcos Ambrose	Stone Brothers Racing	Ford Falcon (AU)	1:23.1792
13	15	(Australia) Todd Kelly	Tom Walkinshaw Racing Australia	Holden Commodore (VX)	1:23.2515
14	10	(Australia) Mark Larkham	Larkham Motorsport	Ford Falcon (AU)	1:23.2648
15	11	(Australia) Larry Perkins	Perkins Engineering	Holden Commodore (VX)	1:23.2723
16	31	(Australia) Steven Ellery	Steven Ellery Racing	Ford Falcon (AU)	1:23.2807
17	66	(Australia) Tony Longhurst	Briggs Motorsport	Ford Falcon (AU)	1:23.2953
18	5	(Australia) Glenn Seton	Glenn Seton Racing	Ford Falcon (AU)	1:23.3598
19	35	(Australia) Jason Bargwanna	Garry Rogers Motorsport	Holden Commodore (VX)	1:23.3793
20	27	(Australia) Neil Crompton	00 Motorsport	Ford Falcon (AU)	1:23.5164
21	54	(Australia) Craig Baird	Rod Nash Racing	Holden Commodore (VX)	1:23.5448
22	02	(Australia) Rick Kelly	Holden Young Lions	Holden Commodore (VX)	1:23.5598
23	36	(Australia) Wayne Gardner	Stone Brothers Racing	Ford Falcon (AU)	1:23.6512
24	9	(Australia) David Besnard	Stone Brothers Racing	Ford Falcon (AU)	1:23.6532
25	021	(New Zealand) Jason Richards	Team Kiwi Racing	Holden Commodore (VT)	1:23.7269
26	24	(Australia) Paul Romano	Romano Racing	Holden Commodore (VX)	1:23.7336
27	46	(New Zealand) John Faulkner	John Faulkner Racing	Holden Commodore (VX)	1:23.7664
28	40	(Australia) Cameron McLean	Paragon Motorsport	Ford Falcon (AU)	1:23.7822
29	29	(Australia) Paul Morris	Paul Morris Motorsport	Holden Commodore (VX)	1:23.9094
30	75	(Australia) Anthony Tratt	Paul Little Racing	Ford Falcon (AU)	1:23.9646
31	7	(Australia) Rodney Forbes	00 Motorsport	Ford Falcon (AU)	1:24.2887
32	43	(Australia) Paul Weel	Paul Weel Racing	Ford Falcon (AU)	1:24.4092
33	3	(Australia) Cameron McConville	Lansvale Racing Team	Holden Commodore (VX)	1:25.4089
34	21	(Australia) Brad Jones	Brad Jones Racing	Ford Falcon (AU)	1:25.5182
35	50	(Australia) Stephen White	Clive Wiseman Racing	Holden Commodore (VX)	1:25.7128

=== Top fifteen shootout ===
Pos	No	Driver	Team	Car	Time
1	1	(Australia) Mark Skaife	Holden Racing Team	Holden Commodore (VX)	1:22.7698
2	2	(Australia) Jason Bright	Holden Racing Team	Holden Commodore (VX)	1:23.1881
3	4	(Australia) Marcos Ambrose	Stone Brothers Racing	Ford Falcon (AU)	1:23.2154
4	34	(Australia) Garth Tander	Garry Rogers Motorsport	Holden Commodore (VX)	1:23.3237
5	65	(Brazil) Max Wilson	Briggs Motorsport	Ford Falcon (AU)	1:23.3419
6	8	(Australia) Russell Ingall	Perkins Engineering	Holden Commodore (VX)	1:23.4492
7	888	(Australia) John Bowe	Brad Jones Racing	Ford Falcon (AU)	1:23.6022
8	00	(Australia) Craig Lowndes	Gibson Motorsport	Ford Falcon (AU)	1:23.6533
9	11	(Australia) Larry Perkins	Perkins Engineering	Holden Commodore (VX)	1:23.6735
10	600	(New Zealand) Simon Wills	Briggs Motorsport	Ford Falcon (AU)	1:23.7880
11	17	(Australia) Steven Johnson	Dick Johnson Racing	Ford Falcon (AU)	1:23.8466
12	16	(New Zealand) Steven Richards	Perkins Engineering	Holden Commodore (VX)	1:23.8904
13	15	(Australia) Todd Kelly	Tom Walkinshaw Racing Australia	Holden Commodore (VX)	1:24.0552
14	10	(Australia) Mark Larkham	Larkham Motorsport	Ford Falcon (AU)	1:24.1842
15	51	(New Zealand) Greg Murphy	Tom Walkinshaw Racing Australia	Holden Commodore (VX)	no time

=== Leg 1 ===
Pos	No	Team	Driver	Car	Laps	Time / Retired	Grid
1	1	(Australia) Mark Skaife	Holden Racing Team	Holden Commodore (VX)	78	2hr 05min 33.336sec	1
2	51	(New Zealand) Greg Murphy	Tom Walkinshaw Racing Australia	Holden Commodore (VX)	78	+ 5.272	15
3	4	(Australia) Marcos Ambrose	Stone Brothers Racing	Ford Falcon (AU)	78	+ 6.052	3
4	00	(Australia) Craig Lowndes	00 Motorsport	Ford Falcon (AU)	78	+ 8.071	8
5	16	(New Zealand) Steven Richards	Perkins Engineering	Holden Commodore (VX)	78	+ 16.183	12
6	34	(Australia) Garth Tander	Garry Rogers Motorsport	Holden Commodore (VX)	78	+ 47.634	4
7	66	(Australia) Tony Longhurst	Briggs Motorsport	Ford Falcon (AU)	78	+ 1:15.938	17
8	17	(Australia) Steven Johnson	Dick Johnson Racing	Ford Falcon (AU)	77	+ 1 lap	11
9	15	(Australia) Todd Kelly	Tom Walkinshaw Racing Australia	Holden Commodore (VX)	77	+ 1 lap	13
10	35	(Australia) Jason Bargwanna	Garry Rogers Motorsport	Holden Commodore (VX)	77	+ 1 lap	19
11	11	(Australia) Larry Perkins	Perkins Engineering	Holden Commodore (VX)	77	+ 1 lap	9
12	54	(New Zealand) Craig Baird	Rod Nash Racing	Holden Commodore (VX)	77	+ 1 lap	21
13	7	(Australia) Rodney Forbes	00 Motorsport	Ford Falcon (AU)	77	+ 1 lap	31
14	10	(Australia) Mark Larkham	Larkham Motorsport	Ford Falcon (AU)	77	+ 1 lap	14
15	021	(New Zealand) Jason Richards	Team Kiwi Racing	Holden Commodore (VT)	77	+ 1 lap	25
16	75	(Australia) Anthony Tratt	Paul Little Racing	Ford Falcon (AU)	76	+ 2 laps	30
17	50	(Australia) Stephen White	Clive Wiseman Racing	Holden Commodore (VT)	75	+ 3 laps	35
18	5	(Australia) Glenn Seton	Glenn Seton Racing	Ford Falcon (AU)	75	+ 3 laps	18
19	888	(Australia) John Bowe	Brad Jones Racing	Ford Falcon (AU)	73	+ 5 laps	7
20	21	(Australia) Brad Jones	Brad Jones Racing	Ford Falcon (AU)	69	+ 9 laps	34
21	8	(Australia) Russell Ingall	Perkins Engineering	Holden Commodore (VX)	67	+ 11 laps	6
Ret	2	(Australia) Jason Bright	Holden Racing Team	Holden Commodore (VX)	72	Suspension	2
Ret	9	(Australia) David Besnard	Stone Brothers Racing	Ford Falcon (AU)	71	Engine	24
Ret	31	(Australia) Steven Ellery	Steven Ellery Racing	Ford Falcon (AU)	58	Accident	16
Ret	29	(Australia) Paul Morris	Paul Morris Motorsport	Holden Commodore (VX)	58	Retired	29
Ret	65	(Brazil) Max Wilson	Briggs Motorsport	Ford Falcon (AU)	56	Oil leak	5
Ret	46	(New Zealand) John Faulkner	John Faulkner Racing	Holden Commodore (VT)	53	Retired	27
Ret	02	(Australia) Rick Kelly	Holden Young Lions	Holden Commodore (VX)	48	Accident	22
Ret	24	(Australia) Paul Romano	Romano Racing	Holden Commodore (VX)	48	Accident	26
Ret	27	(Australia) Neil Crompton	00 Motorsport	Ford Falcon (AU)	38	Engine	20
Ret	43	(Australia) Paul Weel	Paul Weel Racing	Ford Falcon (AU)	20	Spun off	32
Ret	3	(Australia) Cameron McConville	Lansvale Racing Team	Holden Commodore (VX)	16	Engine	33
Ret	40	(Australia) Cameron McLean	Paragon Motorsport	Ford Falcon (AU)	15	Retired	28
Ret	600	(New Zealand) Simon Wills	Briggs Motorsport	Ford Falcon (AU)	3	Accident damage	10
Ret	36	(Australia) Wayne Gardner	Stone Brothers Racing	Ford Falcon (AU)	3	Accident damage	23
Ret	18	(New Zealand) Paul Radisich	Dick Johnson Racing	Ford Falcon (AU)	2	Engine	36
Fastest Lap: Mark Skaife (Holden Racing Team) - 1:23.7200 on lap 43

=== Leg 2 ===
Pos	No	Driver	Team	Car	Laps	Time / Retired	Grid
1	1	(Australia) Mark Skaife	Holden Racing Team	Holden Commodore (VX)	78	2hr 05min 03.953sec	1
2	51	(New Zealand) Greg Murphy	Tom Walkinshaw Racing Australia	Holden Commodore (VX)	78	+ 4.094	2
3	16	(New Zealand) Steven Richards	Perkins Engineering	Holden Commodore (VX)	78	+ 18.524	5
4	00	(Australia) Craig Lowndes	00 Motorsport	Ford Falcon (AU)	78	+ 20.368	4
5	2	(Australia) Jason Bright	Holden Racing Team	Holden Commodore (VX)	78	+ 20.405	22
6	34	(Australia) Garth Tander	Garry Rogers Motorsport	Holden Commodore (VX)	78	+ 24.081	6
7	8	(Australia) Russell Ingall	Perkins Engineering	Holden Commodore (VX)	78	+ 31.716	21
8	888	(Australia) John Bowe	Brad Jones Racing	Ford Falcon (AU)	78	+ 34.915	19
9	35	(Australia) Jason Bargwanna	Garry Rogers Motorsport	Holden Commodore (VX)	78	+ 36.064	10
10	17	(Australia) Steven Johnson	Dick Johnson Racing	Ford Falcon (AU)	78	+ 38.735	8
11	10	(Australia) Mark Larkham	Larkham Motorsport	Ford Falcon (AU)	78	+ 55.081	14
12	15	(Australia) Todd Kelly	Tom Walkinshaw Racing Australia	Holden Commodore (VX)	78	+ 59.898	9
13	43	(Australia) Paul Weel	Paul Weel Racing	Ford Falcon (AU)	78	+ 1:11.095	31
14	11	(Australia) Larry Perkins	Perkins Engineering	Holden Commodore (VX)	78	+ 1:14.450	11
15	36	(Australia) Wayne Gardner	Stone Brothers Racing	Ford Falcon (AU)	78	+ 1:19.028	35
16	600	(New Zealand) Simon Wills	Briggs Motorsport	Ford Falcon (AU)	77	+ 1 lap	34
17	24	(Australia) Paul Romano	Romano Racing	Holden Commodore (VX)	77	+ 1 lap	29
18	66	(Australia) Tony Longhurst	Briggs Motorsport	Ford Falcon (AU)	77	+ 1 lap	7
19	21	(Australia) Brad Jones	Brad Jones Racing	Ford Falcon (AU)	77	+ 1 lap	20
20	7	(Australia) Rodney Forbes	00 Motorsport	Ford Falcon (AU)	75	+ 3 laps	13
21	021	(New Zealand) Jason Richards	Team Kiwi Racing	Holden Commodore (VT)	75	+ 3 laps	15
22	9	(Australia) David Besnard	Stone Brothers Racing	Ford Falcon (AU)	73	+ 5 laps	23
23	75	(Australia) Anthony Tratt	Paul Little Racing	Ford Falcon (AU)	73	+ 5 laps	16
24	40	(Australia) Cameron McLean	Paragon Motorsport	Ford Falcon (AU)	71	+ 7 laps	33
25	29	(Australia) Paul Morris	Paul Morris Motorsport	Holden Commodore (VX)	65	+ 13 laps	25
DNF	4	(Australia) Marcos Ambrose	Stone Brothers Racing	Ford Falcon (AU)	67	Retired	3
DNF	54	(New Zealand) Craig Baird	Rod Nash Racing	Holden Commodore (VX)	60	Retired	12
DNF	5	(Australia) Glenn Seton	Glenn Seton Racing	Ford Falcon (AU)	49	Retired	18
DNF	3	(Australia) Cameron McConville	Lansvale Racing Team	Holden Commodore (VX)	26	Retired	32
DNF	18	(New Zealand) Paul Radisich	Dick Johnson Racing	Ford Falcon (AU)	25	Retired	36
DNF	27	(Australia) Neil Crompton	00 Motorsport	Ford Falcon (AU)	22	Retired	30
DNF	46	(New Zealand) John Faulkner	John Faulkner Racing	Holden Commodore (VT)	16	Retired	27
DNF	50	(Australia) Stephen White	Clive Wiseman Racing	Holden Commodore (VT)	0	Retired	17
DNF	65	(Brazil) Max Wilson	Briggs Motorsport	Ford Falcon (AU)	0	Retired	26
DNS	31	(Australia) Steven Ellery	Steven Ellery Racing	Ford Falcon (AU)		Did not start	
DNS	02	(Australia) Rick Kelly	Holden Young Lions	Holden Commodore (VX)		Did not start	
Fastest Lap: Mark Skaife (Holden Racing Team) - 1:24.3395 on lap 13

=== Round results ===
Pos	No	Driver	Leg 1 points	Leg 2 points	Total points
1	1	(Australia) Mark Skaife	200	200	400
2	51	(New Zealand) Greg Murphy	128	160	288
3	34	(Australia) Garth Tander	160	80	240
4	16	(New Zealand) Steven Richards	80	128	208
5	00	(Australia) Craig Lowndes	88	104	192
6	17	(Australia) Steven Johnson	64	56	120
7	35	(Australia) Jason Bargwanna	56	60	116
8	15	(Australia) Todd Kelly	60	48	108
9	4	(Australia) Marcos Ambrose	104		104
10	66	(Australia) Tony Longhurst	72	30	102
11	8	(Australia) Russell Ingall	24	72	96
12	888	(Australia) John Bowe	28	64	92
13	10	(Australia) Mark Larkham	40	52	92
14	11	(Australia) Larry Perkins	52	40	92
15	2	(Australia) Jason Bright		88	88
16	7	(Australia) Rodney Forbes	44	26	70
17	021	(New Zealand) Jason Richards	36	24	60
18	21	(Australia) Brad Jones	26	28	54
19	75	(Australia) Anthony Tratt	34	20	54
20	54	(New Zealand) Craig Baird	48		48
21	43	(Australia) Paul Weel		44	44
22	36	(Australia) Wayne Gardner		36	36
23	600	(New Zealand) Simon Wills		34	34
24	24	(Australia) Paul Romano		32	32
25	50	(Australia) Stephen White	32		32
26	5	(Australia) Glenn Seton	30		30
27	9	(Australia) David Besnard		22	22
28	40	(Australia) Cameron McLean		18	18
29	29	(Australia) Paul Morris		16	16
DNF	3	(Australia) Cameron McConville			
DNF	02	(Australia) Rick Kelly			
DNF	18	(New Zealand) Paul Radisich			
DNF	27	(Australia) Neil Crompton			
DNF	31	(Australia) Steve Ellery			
DNF	46	(New Zealand) John Faulkner			
DNS	65	(Brazil) Max Wilson			

== Statistics ==
- Provisional Position - #1 Mark Skaife - 1:22.1273
- Pole Position - #1 Mark Skaife - 1:22.7698
- Fastest Lap - #1 Mark Skaife - 1:23.7200 (new lap record)

V8 Supercar
Previous race: Opening round	2002 season	Next race: 2002 Phillip Island V8 Supercar round
