= 2001 Australian V8 Ultimate =

2001 Supercar Championship event

(Victoria (state)) 2001 Australian V8 Ultimate
Event Information
- Round 13 of 13 in the 2001 Shell Championship Series
- Date: 1–2 December 2001
- Location: Melbourne, Victoria
- Venue: Sandown International Raceway
- Weather: Friday: Fine; Saturday: Fine; Sunday: Heavy Rain

Results
Race 1
Distance	48 laps	150 km
Pole position	Mark Skaife; Holden Racing Team	1:11.2564
Winner	Mark Skaife; Holden Racing Team	1:04:59.5617
Race 2
Distance	48 laps	150 km
Winner	Todd Kelly; Tom Walkinshaw Racing Australia	1:12:49.5203
Race 3
Distance	48 laps	150 km
Winner	Craig Lowndes; Gibson Motorsport	1:11:05.3245
Round Results
First	Todd Kelly; Tom Walkinshaw Racing Australia	248 pts
Second	Craig Lowndes; Gibson Motorsport	242 pts
Third	Marcos Ambrose; Stone Brothers Racing	213 pts

The 2001 Australian V8 Ultimate was the thirteenth and final round of the 2001 Shell Championship Series. It was the 30th ATCC/V8 Supercar event to be held at Sandown Raceway in the sprint format and was held on the weekend of 1 to 2 December at the Sandown International Raceway in Melbourne, Victoria.

In a weekend plagued by progressively worsening weather, Todd Kelly claimed overall round honours for the first time in his V8 Supercar career. The first race was won by Mark Skaife in typically dominant fashion. However, as his weekend unraveled, Kelly took the win in race two while Craig Lowndes claimed race three after a thrilling battle with Marcos Ambrose.

== Background ==
The event was held on the weekend of 1 to 2 December 2001. It was the 30th ATCC/V8 Supercar event to be held at Sandown Raceway in the sprint format, and consisted of three 150 km races with compulsory pitstops in all instances.

Mark Skaife entered the round having already sewn up the championship in the previous round at Pukekohe. The race for second place was still on between Russell Ingall and Jason Bright with 85 points between the two drivers. Likewise, Greg Murphy was in contention to secure third in the overall standings.

=== Entry list ===
There were 35 drivers entered for this round with a grid capacity of 32. Pre-qualifying would determine three drivers who would miss out on the weekends racing.

Newly-crowned Australian Drivers' champion Rick Kelly would make his solo V8 Supercar debut as part of the Holden Young Lions outfit. Kelly would be entered under the number 255 in reference to the kW output of the new HSV Coupé. Layton Crambrook would also replace Mick Donaher at Clive Wiseman Racing. Phonsy Mullan made another appearance for GM Motorsport and Matthew White returned to the series with his privateer outfit having last appeared at Calder Park Raceway. After having missed the previous round at Pukekohe, Dugal McDougall returned to the series. Dean Crosswell would also make an appearance for Imrie Motorsport.

== Race results ==
=== Pre-Qualifying ===
Tomas Mezera topped the timing sheets to be the first of seven drivers to pre-qualify for the event. The three drivers not to pre-qualify were Phonsy Mullan for GM Motorsport, Layton Crambrook for Clive Wiseman Racing and Dean Crosswell for Imrie Motorsport.

Pos	No	Name	Team	Vehicle	Time
1	14	(Australia) Tomas Mezera	Imrie Motorsport	Holden Commodore (VX)	1:15.2458
2	16	(Australia) Dugal McDougall	McDougall Motorsport	Holden Commodore (VX)	1:15.8253
3	255	(Australia) Rick Kelly	Holden Young Lions	Holden Commodore (VX)	1:16.4025
4	24	(Australia) Paul Romano	Romano Racing	Holden Commodore (VX)	1:16.8902
5	7	(Australia) Rodney Forbes	Gibson Motorsport	Ford Falcon (AU)	1:17.0898
6	76	(Australia) Matthew White	Matthew White Racing	Holden Commodore (VS)	1:17.6272
7	46	(New Zealand) John Faulkner	John Faulkner Racing	Holden Commodore (VS)	1:18.0631
DNPQ	111	(Australia) Phonsy Mullan	GM Motorsport	Holden Commodore (VS)	1:18.2663
DNPQ	50	(Australia) Layton Crambrook	Clive Wiseman Racing	Holden Commodore (VT)	1:19.9746
DNPQ	13	(Australia) Dean Crosswell	Imrie Motorsport	Holden Commodore (VX)	no time

=== Qualifying ===
Todd Kelly claimed provisional pole position with a time merely six hundredths of a second faster than Craig Lowndes.

Pos	No	Name	Team	Vehicle	Time
1	15	(Australia) Todd Kelly	Tom Walkinshaw Racing Australia	Holden Commodore (VX)	1:11.5651
2	00	(Australia) Craig Lowndes	Gibson Motorsport	Ford Falcon (AU)	1:11.6283
3	51	(New Zealand) Greg Murphy	Tom Walkinshaw Racing Australia	Holden Commodore (VX)	1:11.6793
4	1	(Australia) Mark Skaife	Holden Racing Team	Holden Commodore (VX)	1:11.7271
5	2	(Australia) Jason Bright	Holden Racing Team	Holden Commodore (VX)	1:11.7981
6	18	(New Zealand) Paul Radisich	Dick Johnson Racing	Ford Falcon (AU)	1:11.9300
7	11	(Australia) Larry Perkins	Perkins Engineering	Holden Commodore (VX)	1:11.9606
8	8	(Australia) Russell Ingall	Perkins Engineering	Holden Commodore (VX)	1:11.9809
9	6	(New Zealand) Steven Richards	Glenn Seton Racing	Ford Falcon (AU)	1:12.0715
10	4	(Australia) Marcos Ambrose	Stone Brothers Racing	Ford Falcon (AU)	1:12.1007
11	9	(Australia) David Besnard	Stone Brothers Racing	Ford Falcon (AU)	1:12.1141
12	600	(New Zealand) Simon Wills	Briggs Motor Sport	Ford Falcon (AU)	1:12.2800
13	29	(Australia) Paul Morris	Paul Morris Motorsport	Holden Commodore (VX)	1:12.2996
14	31	(Australia) Steven Ellery	Steven Ellery Racing	Ford Falcon (AU)	1:12.3360
15	5	(Australia) Glenn Seton	Glenn Seton Racing	Ford Falcon (AU)	1:12.3401
16	17	(Australia) Steven Johnson	Dick Johnson Racing	Ford Falcon (AU)	1:12.3451
17	43	(Australia) Paul Weel	Paul Weel Racing	Ford Falcon (AU)	1:12.3722
18	10	(Australia) Mark Larkham	Larkham Motor Sport	Ford Falcon (AU)	1:12.3784
19	35	(Australia) Jason Bargwanna	Garry Rogers Motorsport	Holden Commodore (VX)	1:12.3941
20	34	(Australia) Garth Tander	Garry Rogers Motorsport	Holden Commodore (VX)	1:12.4082
21	24	(Australia) Paul Romano	Romano Racing	Holden Commodore (VX)	1:12.4670
22	54	(Australia) Tony Longhurst	Rod Nash Racing	Holden Commodore (VX)	1:12.4938
23	21	(Australia) Brad Jones	Brad Jones Racing	Ford Falcon (AU)	1:12.5159
24	021	(New Zealand) Jason Richards	Team Kiwi Racing	Holden Commodore (VT)	1:12.5863
25	7	(Australia) Rodney Forbes	Gibson Motorsport	Ford Falcon (AU)	1:12.6749
26	255	(Australia) Rick Kelly	Holden Racing Team	Holden Commodore (VX)	1:12.8653
27	3	(Australia) Cameron McConville	Lansvale Racing Team	Holden Commodore (VX)	1:12.9060
28	46	(New Zealand) John Faulkner	John Faulkner Racing	Holden Commodore (VT)	1:12.9729
29	75	(Australia) Anthony Tratt	Paul Little Racing	Ford Falcon (AU)	1:13.1390
30	76	(Australia) Matthew White	Matthew White Racing	Holden Commodore (VS)	1:13.6237
31	16	(Australia) Dugal McDougall	McDougall Motorsport	Holden Commodore (VX)	1:13.6320
32	14	(Australia) Tomas Mezera	Imrie Motorsport	Holden Commodore (VX)	no time
DNQ	13	(Australia) Dean Crosswell	Imrie Motorsport	Holden Commodore (VX)	Did not qualify
DNQ	50	(Australia) Layton Crambrook	Clive Wiseman Racing	Holden Commodore (VT)	Did not qualify
DNQ	111	(Australia) Phonsy Mullan	GM Motorsport	Holden Commodore (VS)	Did not qualify

=== Top fifteen shootout ===
Mark Skaife claimed his fourth pole position of the season after setting a laptime one tenth of a second faster than Greg Murphy. In doing so, Skaife broke the qualifying deadlock with Marcos Ambrose to claim the most pole positions of any driver in 2001.

Ambrose himself had made the biggest gain from the shootout, claiming fourth place after initially qualifying tenth. The driver who lost the most relative ground was Craig Lowndes who, after running wide at turn one, had gone from second in the provisional order to 14th on corrected.

Simon Wills' first shootout lap was marred by a lack of grip that saw him run wide at several corners and ultimately led to him placing last.

Pos	No	Name	Team	Vehicle	Time
1	1	(Australia) Mark Skaife	Holden Racing Team	Holden Commodore (VX)	1:11.2564
2	51	(New Zealand) Greg Murphy	Tom Walkinshaw Racing Australia	Holden Commodore (VX)	1:11.3574
3	15	(Australia) Todd Kelly	Tom Walkinshaw Racing Australia	Holden Commodore (VX)	1:11.4480
4	4	(Australia) Marcos Ambrose	Stone Brothers Racing	Ford Falcon (AU)	1:11.4927
5	2	(Australia) Jason Bright	Holden Racing Team	Holden Commodore (VX)	1:11.5005
6	8	(Australia) Russell Ingall	Perkins Engineering	Holden Commodore (VX)	1:11.7299
7	18	(New Zealand) Paul Radisich	Dick Johnson Racing	Ford Falcon (AU)	1:11.7426
8	31	(Australia) Steven Ellery	Steven Ellery Racing	Ford Falcon (AU)	1:11.7790
9	5	(Australia) Glenn Seton	Glenn Seton Racing	Ford Falcon (AU)	1:11.9256
10	11	(Australia) Larry Perkins	Perkins Engineering	Holden Commodore (VX)	1:12.0316
11	6	(New Zealand) Steven Richards	Glenn Seton Racing	Ford Falcon (AU)	1:12.2845
12	9	(Australia) David Besnard	Stone Brothers Racing	Ford Falcon (AU)	1:12.2946
13	29	(Australia) Paul Morris	Paul Morris Motorsport	Holden Commodore (VX)	1:12.3404
14	00	(Australia) Craig Lowndes	Gibson Motorsport	Ford Falcon (AU)	1:12.3617
15	600	(New Zealand) Simon Wills	Briggs Motor Sport	Ford Falcon (AU)	1:12.8046

=== Race 1 ===
Tomas Mezera would start the race from the pitlane owing to problems in qualifying.

Greg Murphy got the jump on Mark Skaife to take the lead into turn one. Down the pack, Larry Perkins and Paul Weel bogged down and drifted down the pack. The safety car would be deployed before the end of the lap after Cameron McConville was set into a series of rollovers after receiving contact from Mark Larkham, who had been squeezed by two cars to his inside – Paul Romano and Rodney Forbes. McConville's car sustained significant damage and was forced out of the race. Larkham nursed his car back to the pitlane with damage to the steering from the impact.

The race resumed on lap four and Murphy began to eek out a margin over Skaife. With the pit window open, Murphy and Ambrose made their compulsory pitstops immediately whilst the Holden Racing Team elected to keep their drivers out for a longer stint. Murphy suffered a slow pitstop that cost him five seconds and ceded position to Ambrose. Rick Kelly's solo debut came to an end on lap seven after his engine blew whilst on the back straight. Romano retired from the race owing to issues with the front-right suspension. Steven Ellery would receive a stop-go penalty for speeding in pitlane. Skaife finally made his pitstop on lap 14. Perkins was issued a stop-go penalty for spinning Simon Wills at turn two.

The safety car was back out on track on lap 25 when Anthony Tratt spun into the gravel at turn one. There was speculation as to whether the two Holden Racing Team cars would invert positions so as to give Jason Bright a better chance of securing second in the championship. This speculation came to naught when Skaife defended his position aggressively heading into turn one, not allowing his teammate to pass by for the lead. Behind them, Murphy moved past Kelly for third and began to apply pressure to Bright. On lap 31, Bright slid wide after getting crossed up at turn six. He rejoined the track, behind Murphy, and a momentary loss of power on the exit of turn eight saw him lose nearly a dozen positions. In an evasive maneuver, Kelly made slight contact with the rear of his car, enough for the guard to start rubbing on the tyre. Paul Radisich's strong run was curtailed after a spin at the final corner.

Murphy's campaign for the win was halted after he was given a stop-go penalty for kerb-hopping. To the end, Skaife remained unopposed, taking his ninth win of the season and his 50th win in the Australian touring car category. Lowndes passed Kelly for second with the latter rounding out the podium.

Pos	No	Name	Team	Vehicle	Laps	Time	Grid
1	1	(Australia) Mark Skaife	Holden Racing Team	Holden Commodore (VX)	48	1hr 4min 59.5617sec	1
2	00	(Australia) Craig Lowndes	Gibson Motorsport	Ford Falcon (AU)	48	+ 5.381	14
3	15	(Australia) Todd Kelly	Tom Walkinshaw Racing Australia	Holden Commodore (VX)	48	+ 7.413	3
4	8	(Australia) Russell Ingall	Perkins Engineering	Holden Commodore (VX)	48	+ 8.332	6
5	2	(Australia) Jason Bright	Holden Racing Team	Holden Commodore (VX)	48	+ 12.643	5
6	4	(Australia) Marcos Ambrose	Stone Brothers Racing	Ford Falcon (AU)	48	+ 13.915	4
7	5	(Australia) Glenn Seton	Glenn Seton Racing	Ford Falcon (AU)	48	+ 25.528	9
8	51	(New Zealand) Greg Murphy	Tom Walkinshaw Racing Australia	Holden Commodore (VX)	48	+ 27.344	2
9	35	(Australia) Jason Bargwanna	Garry Rogers Motorsport	Holden Commodore (VX)	48	+ 29.468	19
10	21	(Australia) Brad Jones	Brad Jones Racing	Ford Falcon (AU)	48	+ 34.836	23
11	31	(Australia) Steven Ellery	Steven Ellery Racing	Ford Falcon (AU)	48	+ 35.264	8
12	17	(Australia) Steven Johnson	Dick Johnson Racing	Ford Falcon (AU)	48	+ 35.339	16
13	11	(Australia) Larry Perkins	Perkins Engineering	Holden Commodore (VX)	48	+ 35.543	10
14	9	(Australia) David Besnard	Stone Brothers Racing	Ford Falcon (AU)	48	+ 39.860	12
15	6	(New Zealand) Steven Richards	Glenn Seton Racing	Ford Falcon (AU)	48	+ 44.333	11
16	34	(Australia) Garth Tander	Garry Rogers Motorsport	Holden Commodore (VX)	48	+ 45.646	20
17	16	(Australia) Dugal McDougall	McDougall Motorsport	Holden Commodore (VX)	48	+ 49.694	31
18	600	(New Zealand) Simon Wills	Briggs Motorsport	Ford Falcon (AU)	48	+ 50.185	15
19	021	(New Zealand) Jason Richards	Team Kiwi Racing	Holden Commodore (VT)	48	+ 55.199	24
20	18	(New Zealand) Paul Radisich	Dick Johnson Racing	Ford Falcon (AU)	48	+ 57.438	7
21	43	(Australia) Paul Weel	Paul Weel Racing	Ford Falcon (AU)	48	+ 57.676	17
22	54	(Australia) Tony Longhurst	Rod Nash Racing	Holden Commodore (VX)	47	+ 1 lap	22
23	14	(Australia) Tomas Mezera	Imrie Motorsport	Holden Commodore (VX)	47	+ 1 lap	PL
24	7	(Australia) Rodney Forbes	Gibson Motorsport	Ford Falcon (AU)	39	+ 9 laps	25
Ret	76	(Australia) Matthew White	Matthew White Racing	Holden Commodore (VS)	33	Mechanical	30
Ret	10	(Australia) Mark Larkham	Larkham Motorsport	Ford Falcon (AU)	31	Suspension	18
Ret	29	(Australia) Paul Morris	Paul Morris Motorsport	Holden Commodore (VX)	29	Power steering	13
Ret	75	(Australia) Anthony Tratt	Paul Little Racing	Ford Falcon (AU)	25	Spun off	29
Ret	46	(New Zealand) John Faulkner	John Faulkner Racing	Holden Commodore (VT)	13	Mechanical	28
Ret	24	(Australia) Paul Romano	Romano Racing	Holden Commodore (VX)	9	Suspension	21
Ret	255	(Australia) Rick Kelly	Holden Young Lions	Holden Commodore (VX)	7	Engine	26
Ret	3	(Australia) Cameron McConville	Lansvale Racing Team	Holden Commodore (VX)	0	Accident	27
Fastest Lap: Mark Skaife (Holden Racing Team) - 1:12.1690 on lap 8

=== Race 2 ===
In contrast to the sunny conditions of race one, rain enveloped the circuit for race two. Lowndes initially got a good launch off the front row, but the secondary phase was less optimal and was overtaken by Skaife and Murphy, who had initially started from eighth place. A concertina effect at turn four saw multiple cars sustain heavy damage. Larry Perkins retired within meters of the incident as a result of the damage which included a fire in the engine bay. Paul Romano and Anthony Tratt would also retire due to heavy front-end damage. Romano's car left a trail of oil all the way back to pitlane. The biggest mover of the opening lap was Paul Radisich who had leapt up from 20th on the grid to sixth.

The race restarted on lap six with Murphy passing Skaife for the lead at turn four. However, he would slide off the track later in the lap after sliding off the track courtesy of the oil left by Romano's car and in the process, handed the lead over to teammate, Todd Kelly. Kelly would complete his compulsory pitstop just a couple corners later and with Skaife still struggling for grip, Lowndes assumed the lead heading onto the front straight with Radisich in second. Multiple drivers struggled with condensation within the cars with some even resorting to unconventional methods to clear their windscreens. Those who pitted early benefitted the most as the undercut proved successful. Kelly retook the lead from Murphy and Lowndes. Skaife's pace suffered and re-emerged behind Ambrose. Steven Johnson retired from the race on lap 13 after experiencing an engine failure on the approach to the final corner. Paul Morris was issued a black flag for kerb-hopping on lap 15.

By the midway point of the race, the rain had intensified. Ingall struggled to see out of his car owing to a demist failure. Championship rival Jason Bright also ran into trouble when he spun in tandem with John Faulkner at Dandenong Road Corner. The race order remained fairly stagnant with no movers or shakers in the first few front running positions. Lowndes' charge to second was stunted when his windscreen wiper failed, hindering his vision. Ingall's pace had slowed to a crawl as visibility out of his windscren had been reduced to zero and attempted to nurse his car to the finish line. Paul Weel aquaplaned on the front straight and made contact with the armco barrier, but despite the damage was able to cycle around to the finish.

Todd Kelly led comfortably to the finish to take victory. Murphy finished second in the sister car while Lowndes rounded out the podium. Controversy arose following a pitlane violation involving Mark Skaife. Whilst completing his compulsory pitstop, car controller Jeff Grech cleared grass from the radiator. The rules dictated the car controller was ineligible to do that and the punishment for said offence should have been a stop-go penalty. The stewards failed to pick up on this during the race and the post-race penalty applied should have been time added. However, the stewards would hand down a $1,000 fine instead and Skaife's result remained unaffected. The decision incensed fellow competitors in the pitlane.

Pos	No	Name	Team	Vehicle	Laps	Time	Grid
1	15	(Australia) Todd Kelly	Tom Walkinshaw Racing Australia	Holden Commodore (VX)	48	1hr 12min 49.5203sec	3
2	51	(New Zealand) Greg Murphy	Tom Walkinshaw Racing Australia	Holden Commodore (VX)	48	+ 10.481	8
3	00	(Australia) Craig Lowndes	Gibson Motorsport	Ford Falcon (AU)	48	+ 16.660	2
4	1	(Australia) Mark Skaife	Holden Racing Team	Holden Commodore (VX)	48	+ 18.032	1
5	4	(Australia) Marcos Ambrose	Stone Brothers Racing	Ford Falcon (AU)	48	+ 36.186	6
6	18	(New Zealand) Paul Radisich	Dick Johnson Racing	Ford Falcon (AU)	48	+ 37.706	20
7	35	(Australia) Jason Bargwanna	Garry Rogers Motorsport	Holden Commodore (VX)	48	+ 51.329	9
8	6	(New Zealand) Steven Richards	Glenn Seton Racing	Ford Falcon (AU)	48	+ 59.882	15
9	021	(New Zealand) Jason Richards	Team Kiwi Racing	Holden Commodore (VT)	48	+ 1:03.875	19
10	31	(Australia) Steven Ellery	Steven Ellery Racing	Ford Falcon (AU)	48	+ 1:07.592	11
11	2	(Australia) Jason Bright	Holden Racing Team	Holden Commodore (VX)	47	+ 1 lap	5
12	21	(Australia) Brad Jones	Brad Jones Racing	Ford Falcon (AU)	47	+ 1 lap	10
13	46	(New Zealand) John Faulkner	John Faulkner Racing	Holden Commodore (VT)	47	+ 1 lap	29
14	9	(Australia) David Besnard	Stone Brothers Racing	Ford Falcon (AU)	47	+ 1 lap	14
15	600	(New Zealand) Simon Wills	Briggs Motorsport	Ford Falcon (AU)	47	+ 1 lap	18
16	43	(Australia) Paul Weel	Paul Weel Racing	Ford Falcon (AU)	47	+ 1 lap	21
17	5	(Australia) Glenn Seton	Glenn Seton Racing	Ford Falcon (AU)	47	+ 1 lap	7
18	14	(Australia) Tomas Mezera	Imrie Motorsport	Holden Commodore (VX)	46	+ 2 laps	23
19	7	(Australia) Rodney Forbes	Gibson Motorsport	Ford Falcon (AU)	46	+ 2 laps	24
20	54	(Australia) Tony Longhurst	Rod Nash Racing	Holden Commodore (VX)	46	+ 2 laps	22
21	34	(Australia) Garth Tander	Garry Rogers Motorsport	Holden Commodore (VX)	46	+ 2 laps	16
22	255	(Australia) Rick Kelly	Holden Young Lions	Holden Commodore (VX)	46	+ 2 laps	30
23	8	(Australia) Russell Ingall	Perkins Engineering	Holden Commodore (VX)	46	+ 2 laps	4
24	10	(Australia) Mark Larkham	Larkham Motorsport	Ford Falcon (AU)	46	+ 2 laps	26
25	3	(Australia) Cameron McConville	Lansvale Racing Team	Holden Commodore (VX)	45	+ 3 laps	31
26	16	(Australia) Dugal McDougall	McDougall Motorsport	Holden Commodore (VX)	40	+ 8 laps	17
Ret	29	(Australia) Paul Morris	Paul Morris Motorsport	Holden Commodore (VX)	46	Retired	27
Ret	17	(Australia) Steven Johnson	Dick Johnson Racing	Ford Falcon (AU)	12	Engine	12
Ret	75	(Australia) Anthony Tratt	Paul Little Racing	Ford Falcon (AU)	1	Accident damage	28
Ret	11	(Australia) Larry Perkins	Perkins Engineering	Holden Commodore (VX)	0	Accident / Fire	13
Ret	24	(Australia) Paul Romano	Romano Racing	Holden Commodore (VX)	0	Accident damage	29
Fastest Lap: Mark Skaife (Holden Racing Team) - 1:21.0583 on lap 47

=== Race 3 ===
After two bad accidents in the support races, the officials elected to start the race under the safety car to disperse the standings water and reduce the risk of a bottleneck effect heading into turn one.

The race went green on lap three with Kelly leading away from Murphy. Skaife passed Lowndes for third at turn one shortly after the start and Jason Bargwanna moved up to sixth after passing Radisich at the same point of the circuit. Lowndes would repass Skaife for position just one lap later. Kelly was the first of the front-runners to pit on lap four. Murphy, Lowndes and Skaife pitted just one lap later. Skaife's pit was stunted by a problem with the front-right wheel and was further compounded when he slid off the track shortly after exiting the pits. On corrected order, Murphy was the race leader from Lowndes. On lap eight, Lowndes passed Murphy for the effective lead at turn four. Later in the lap, Lowndes slid off the road at turn nine and contracted a substantial amount of grass in the front of his car.

A short while later, Glenn Seton aquaplaned off the circuit on the approach to turn one. The car continued to slew sideways into the run off before finally coming to rest in the gravel where it almost rolled over. The safety car was deployed and Gibson Motorsport took the opportunity to pit Lowndes to clear the radiator of the grass. Paul Radisich's season came to an end on the same lap after his car suffered a misfire. The race resumed a few laps later with Bargwanna leading from Jason Richards; both of whom had yet to complete their compulsory pitstops. The treacherous conditions began to catch more people out. Brad Jones was shunted off into the turn two runoff following contact with Steven Ellery. Rodney Forbes spun at turn one on the following lap and was narrowly avoided by Anthony Tratt. Later that lap, Mark Skaife sustained damage to the front end of his car after conflict with Steven Richards which spun both cars. With the damage inflicted and no championship ramifications remaining, Skaife pitted his car and retired from the race. Bargwanna pitted on lap 18 and handed the lead over to Jason Richards. After completing his pitstop, Richards was then issued with a stop-go penalty for a pitlane speeding infringement. Garth Tander retired from the race after encountering problems with the demister again.

Lowndes began to charge through the field and was demonstrably the fastest driver on the circuit. He passed Kelly for second on lap 40 and set off after Marcos Ambrose. Greg Murphy retired on the same lap due to a mechanical issue. With four laps remaining, Lowndes had caught up to Ambrose and the two would engage in an enthralling battle for the lead. Up the back straight, Lowndes utilised traction to get past Ambrose to claim the lead. A few corners later however, Ambrose made an opportunistic move down the inside of the final corner to reclaim the lead. At turn four on the following lap, Lowndes repassed Ambrose and from there, he would not relinquish the lead. Lowndes romped home to claim victory with Ambrose in tow and Todd Kelly third, claiming overall round honours in the process.

Pos	No	Name	Team	Vehicle	Laps	Time	Grid
1	00	(Australia) Craig Lowndes	Gibson Motorsport	Ford Falcon (AU)	48	1hr 11min 05.3245sec	3
2	4	(Australia) Marcos Ambrose	Stone Brothers Racing	Ford Falcon (AU)	48	+ 1.926	5
3	15	(Australia) Todd Kelly	Tom Walkinshaw Racing Australia	Holden Commodore (VX)	48	+ 3.003	1
4	2	(Australia) Jason Bright	Holden Racing Team	Holden Commodore (VX)	48	+ 12.428	11
5	29	(Australia) Paul Morris	Paul Morris Motorsport	Holden Commodore (VX)	48	+ 13.275	27
6	8	(Australia) Russell Ingall	Perkins Engineering	Holden Commodore (VX)	48	+ 26.345	23
7	255	(Australia) Rick Kelly	Holden Young Lions	Holden Commodore (VX)	48	+ 47.018	22
8	11	(Australia) Larry Perkins	Perkins Engineering	Holden Commodore (VX)	48	+ 47.868	30
9	600	(New Zealand) Simon Wills	Briggs Motorsport	Ford Falcon (AU)	48	+ 48.137	15
10	46	(New Zealand) John Faulkner	John Faulkner Racing	Holden Commodore (VT)	48	+ 48.901	13
11	21	(Australia) Brad Jones	Brad Jones Racing	Ford Falcon (AU)	48	+ 49.902	12
12	35	(Australia) Jason Bargwanna	Garry Rogers Motorsport	Holden Commodore (VX)	48	+ 50.483	7
13	17	(Australia) Steven Johnson	Dick Johnson Racing	Ford Falcon (AU)	48	+ 1:03.520	28
14	31	(Australia) Steven Ellery	Steven Ellery Racing	Ford Falcon (AU)	48	+ 1:10.273	10
15	9	(Australia) David Besnard	Stone Brothers Racing	Ford Falcon (AU)	48	+ 1:11.937	14
16	021	(New Zealand) Jason Richards	Team Kiwi Racing	Holden Commodore (VT)	47	+ 1 lap	9
17	54	(Australia) Tony Longhurst	Rod Nash Racing	Holden Commodore (VX)	47	+ 1 lap	20
18	10	(Australia) Mark Larkham	Larkham Motorsport	Ford Falcon (AU)	47	+ 1 lap	24
19	14	(Australia) Tomas Mezera	Imrie Motorsport	Holden Commodore (VX)	47	+ 1 lap	18
20	75	(Australia) Anthony Tratt	Paul Little Racing	Ford Falcon (AU)	46	+ 2 laps	29
21	7	(Australia) Rodney Forbes	Gibson Motorsport	Ford Falcon (AU)	46	+ 2 laps	19
22	3	(Australia) Cameron McConville	Lansvale Racing Team	Holden Commodore (VX)	43	+ 5 laps	25
Ret	43	(Australia) Paul Weel	Paul Weel Racing	Ford Falcon (AU)	47	Mechanical	16
Ret	6	(New Zealand) Steven Richards	Glenn Seton Racing	Ford Falcon (AU)	43	Spun off	8
Ret	51	(New Zealand) Greg Murphy	Tom Walkinshaw Racing Australia	Holden Commodore (VX)	40	Mechanical	2
Ret	1	(Australia) Mark Skaife	Holden Racing Team	Holden Commodore (VX)	15	Accident damage	4
Ret	34	(Australia) Garth Tander	Garry Rogers Motorsport	Holden Commodore (VX)	14	Mechanical	21
Ret	18	(New Zealand) Paul Radisich	Dick Johnson Racing	Ford Falcon (AU)	8	Engine	6
Ret	5	(Australia) Glenn Seton	Glenn Seton Racing	Ford Falcon (AU)	8	Spun off	17
Fastest Lap: Jason Bright (Holden Racing Team) - 1:19.8116 on lap 47

== Championship points ==
Round points tally

Pos.	No	Driver	Team	Pts
1	15	(Australia) Todd Kelly	Tom Walkinshaw Racing Australia	248
2	00	(Australia) Craig Lowndes	Gibson Motorsport	242
3	4	(Australia) Marcos Ambrose	Stone Brothers Racing	213
4	1	(Australia) Mark Skaife	Holden Racing Team	188
5	2	(Australia) Jason Bright	Holden Racing Team	184

Drivers' Championship standings

Pos.	No	Driver	Team	Pts
1	1	(Australia) Mark Skaife	Holden Racing Team	3478
2	8	(Australia) Russell Ingall	Perkins Engineering	2875
3	2	(Australia) Jason Bright	Holden Racing Team	2819
4	51	(New Zealand) Greg Murphy	Tom Walkinshaw Racing Australia	2724
5	17	(Australia) Steven Johnson	Dick Johnson Racing	2532
