= 2001 Canberra 400 =

Auto Race

(Australian Capital Territory) 2001 Canberra 400
Event Information
- Round 5 of 13 in the 2001 Shell Championship Series
- Date: 8–10 June 2001
- Location: Canberra, Australian Capital Territory
- Venue: Canberra Street Circuit
- Weather: Overcast

Results
Race 1
Distance	25 laps	100 km
Pole position	Steven Johnson; Dick Johnson Racing	1:43.8738
Winner	Steven Johnson; Dick Johnson Racing	48:35.6895
Race 2
Distance	25 laps	100 km
Winner	Steven Richards; Glenn Seton Racing	50:49.9364
Race 3
Distance	50 laps	200 km
Winner	Mark Skaife; Holden Racing Team	1:36:27.5354
Round Results
First	Steven Johnson; Dick Johnson Racing	294 pts
Second	Garth Tander; Garry Rogers Motorsport	288 pts
Third	Mark Skaife; Holden Racing Team	282 pts

The 2001 Canberra 400 (known for sponsorship reasons as the 2001 GMC 400) was the fifth round of the 2001 Shell Championship Series and the second running of the Canberra 400 event. It was held on the weekend of 9 to 10 June on the Canberra Street Circuit in Canberra, Australian Capital Territory.

The Dick Johnson Racing outfit set the pace throughout the weekend. Paul Radisich dominated the early part of the weekend, claiming provisional pole position by nearly half a second over teammate and nearest competitor, Steven Johnson. After Radisich spun in the shootout, Johnson capitilised to cease his first V8 Supercar pole position. He would then go on to claim his first race victory in the first heat, and his accumulated points tally gave him his first round victory to boot.

Despite experiencing a difficult second race, Mark Skaife's third place finish for the round enabled him to retake the championship lead from teammate, Jason Bright. A lead that he would not relinquish en route to his fourth Australian Touring Car Championship title.

== Background ==
The event was held on the weekend of 9 to 10 June 2001. It was the second V8 Supercar event to be held on the streets of Canberra, and consisted of two 100 km races followed by a 200 km final which would reward double points. Pitstops were compulsory for all races. Race two would feature the sole reverse grid race of the season.

Following the inaugural event in 2000, the Canberra Street Circuit had been modified to allow for more overtaking opportunities. This included the widening of the front straight by 1.6 meters, an extension of the turn one runoff by 12 meters, the bus stop was resurfaced, the entry and exit to Flynn Drive was widened, with an extension of runoff, and the approach to turn 13 was widened by roughly a car width to encourage overtaking. In contrast the heat of Darwin, the Canberra event is typically marked by comparatively cold temperatures. This year however, conditions were noticeably more tolerable than 2000 was, and what 2002 would be.

Jason Bright entered the round as the championship leader over Holden Racing Team teammate, Mark Skaife. Unlike many of the drivers, Bright had no prior experience of the Canberra Street Circuit after having spent the 2000 season racing in Indy Lights in the United States.

Electronic pit speed limiters would be introduced across all cars for the first time at this event. The pit speed limit would also be reduced from 60 kph to 40 kph. Changes were also made to allow only one steel gantry per team in the pitlane as a result of numerous safety issues throughout the year.

=== Entry list ===
There were 32 drivers entered into the event with no changes from the entry list in the previous round in Darwin.

Paul Romano reverted from the VT Commodore to the VX Commodore.

== Race results ==
=== Qualifying ===
Paul Radisich obliterated the field by posting a time nearly half a second faster than teammate and nearest competitor, Steven Johnson. Only four drivers posted a time within the 1 minute 43 second bracket. Two drivers failed to complete lap times - Mark Larkham and Steve Reed owing to session-ending crashes.

Pos	No	Name	Team	Vehicle	Time
1	18	(New Zealand) Paul Radisich	Dick Johnson Racing	Ford Falcon (AU)	1:43.2704
2	17	(Australia) Steven Johnson	Dick Johnson Racing	Ford Falcon (AU)	1:43.8316
3	5	(Australia) Glenn Seton	Glenn Seton Racing	Ford Falcon (AU)	1:43.8426
4	1	(Australia) Mark Skaife	Holden Racing Team	Holden Commodore (VX)	1:43.8919
5	4	(Australia) Marcos Ambrose	Stone Brothers Racing	Ford Falcon (AU)	1:44.0667
6	29	(Australia) Paul Morris	Paul Morris Motorsport	Holden Commodore (VX)	1:44.1644
7	00	(Australia) Craig Lowndes	Gibson Motorsport	Ford Falcon (AU)	1:44.2608
8	15	(Australia) Todd Kelly	Tom Walkinshaw Racing Australia	Holden Commodore (VX)	1:44.2612
9	8	(Australia) Russell Ingall	Perkins Engineering	Holden Commodore (VX)	1:44.3244
10	34	(Australia) Garth Tander	Garry Rogers Motorsport	Holden Commodore (VX)	1:44.3245
11	31	(Australia) Steven Ellery	Steven Ellery Racing	Ford Falcon (AU)	1:44.3483
12	51	(New Zealand) Greg Murphy	Tom Walkinshaw Racing Australia	Holden Commodore (VX)	1:44.3921
13	40	(Australia) Cameron McLean	Paragon Motorsport	Ford Falcon (AU)	1:44.4722
14	3	(Australia) Cameron McConville	Lansvale Racing Team	Holden Commodore (VX)	1:44.4879
15	6	(New Zealand) Steven Richards	Glenn Seton Racing	Ford Falcon (AU)	1:44.7029
16	11	(Australia) Larry Perkins	Perkins Engineering	Holden Commodore (VX)	1:44.7970
17	2	(Australia) Jason Bright	Holden Racing Team	Holden Commodore (VX)	1:44.8174
18	600	(Australia) John Bowe	Briggs Motor Sport	Ford Falcon (AU)	1:44.9314
19	9	(Australia) David Besnard	Stone Brothers Racing	Ford Falcon (AU)	1:45.0368
20	35	(Australia) Jason Bargwanna	Garry Rogers Motorsport	Holden Commodore (VX)	1:45.1110
21	75	(Australia) Anthony Tratt	Paul Little Racing	Ford Falcon (AU)	1:45.4122
22	43	(Australia) Paul Weel	Paul Weel Racing	Ford Falcon (AU)	1:45.5478
23	21	(Australia) Brad Jones	Brad Jones Racing	Ford Falcon (AU)	1:45.6045
24	46	(New Zealand) John Faulkner	John Faulkner Racing	Holden Commodore (VT)	1:45.8385
25	7	(Australia) Rodney Forbes	Gibson Motorsport	Ford Falcon (AU)	1:46.0242
26	54	(Australia) Tony Longhurst	Rod Nash Racing	Holden Commodore (VX)	1:46.1705
27	021	(New Zealand) Jason Richards	Team Kiwi Racing	Holden Commodore (VT)	1:46.4526
28	16	(Australia) Dugal McDougall	McDougall Motorsport	Holden Commodore (VX)	1:46.5909
29	50	(Australia) Tyler Mecklem	Clive Wiseman Racing	Holden Commodore (VT)	1:47.9741
30	24	(Australia) Paul Romano	Romano Racing	Holden Commodore (VX)	1:48.8214
-	10	(Australia) Mark Larkham	Larkham Motor Sport	Ford Falcon (AU)	no time
-	23	(Australia) Steve Reed	Lansvale Racing Team	Holden Commodore (VS)	no time

=== Top fifteen shootout ===
Multiple drivers struggled with car setup throughout the shootout and expressed dissatisfaction with their lap times. Cameron McLean sustained damage to the steering after collecting a tyre bundle on the apex of turn one. Todd Kelly also made contact with the wall exiting the bus stop.

Radisich entered the shootout as the favourite to take pole position. However, after spinning on the exit of the bus stop, pole position would be claimed by teammate, Steven Johnson. It would be Johnson's first V8 Supercar pole position and Dick Johnson Racing's first pole position of the season.

Pos	No	Name	Team	Vehicle	Time	Points
1	17	(Australia) Steven Johnson	Dick Johnson Racing	Ford Falcon (AU)	1:43.8378	18
2	4	(Australia) Marcos Ambrose	Stone Brothers Racing	Ford Falcon (AU)	1:43.9260	16
3	5	(Australia) Glenn Seton	Glenn Seton Racing	Ford Falcon (AU)	1:44.0948	14
4	31	(Australia) Steven Ellery	Steven Ellery Racing	Ford Falcon (AU)	1:44.2596	13
5	1	(Australia) Mark Skaife	Holden Racing Team	Holden Commodore (VX)	1:44.3167	12
6	15	(Australia) Todd Kelly	Tom Walkinshaw Racing Australia	Holden Commodore (VX)	1:44.3904	11
7	00	(Australia) Craig Lowndes	Gibson Motorsport	Ford Falcon (AU)	1:44.4893	10
8	6	(New Zealand) Steven Richards	Glenn Seton Racing	Ford Falcon (AU)	1:44.5839	9
9	34	(Australia) Garth Tander	Garry Rogers Motorsport	Holden Commodore (VX)	1:44.6413	8
10	51	(New Zealand) Greg Murphy	Tom Walkinshaw Racing Australia	Holden Commodore (VX)	1:44.7216	7
11	3	(Australia) Cameron McConville	Lansvale Racing Team	Holden Commodore (VX)	1:45.1435	
12	8	(Australia) Russell Ingall	Perkins Engineering	Holden Commodore (VX)	1:45.4871	
13	29	(Australia) Paul Morris	Paul Morris Motorsport	Holden Commodore (VX)	1:45.5590	
14	40	(Australia) Cameron McLean	Paragon Motorsport	Ford Falcon (AU)	1:48.0227	
15	18	(New Zealand) Paul Radisich	Dick Johnson Racing	Ford Falcon (AU)	2:48.9116	

=== Race 1 ===
John Faulkner would not take the start for this, nor the second race, after a flat tyre lead to a high speed crash in the morning warm-up.

Steven Johnson led from the pole position off the line while Todd Kelly bogged it down and lost a half dozen positions. The pit window opened on lap three and most of the front-runners elected to take their compulsory pitstops, with the exception of Glenn Seton, Craig Lowndes and Russell Ingall. The Holden Racing Team managed to turn Skaife around quickly enough to jump Marcos Ambrose in the queue. Seton would make his pitstop and emerged just ahead of Skaife. Lowndes was amongst the last of the drivers to pit, opting for a couple laps of clear air to complete an overcut and jump up a few positions. This paid dividends and he emerged just behind effective race leader, Johnson.

On lap ten, Ambrose retired from the race after his gearbox failed. With his car stranded on the outside of the final corner, the safety car was deployed. When racing resumed, Skaife pounced on Seton on the outside of turn one and moved up to third. Garth Tander followed suit later on into the lap to move into fourth. Steven Richards was relegated to the pitlane to repair damage to the front-left suspension, losing a lap in the process. On lap 19, Todd Kelly made contact with Steven Ellery after attempting an overtake at the top end of the circuit. Both drivers spun around and had to wait whilst the rest of the pack funneled through. Kelly's teammate Greg Murphy also found himself caught out in the melee.

Lowndes appeared to exhibit more pace than Johnson. For the last half dozen laps, he continued to apply pressure, looking for a way past wherever he could. The battle began to plateau and the challengers ran out of laps. Johnson held off the challenge to take his first win in the V8 Supercar category. This was also Dick Johnson Racing's first win of the season. Radisich had also completed a miraculous recovery drive from 15th to finish in sixth.

Pos	No	Driver	Team	Car	Laps	Time	Grid	Points
1	17	(Australia) Steven Johnson	Dick Johnson Racing	Ford Falcon (AU)	25	48min 35.6895sec	1	90
2	00	(Australia) Craig Lowndes	Gibson Motorsport	Ford Falcon (AU)	25	+ 0.25	7	80
3	1	(Australia) Mark Skaife	Holden Racing Team	Holden Commodore (VX)	25	+ 1.14	5	72
4	34	(Australia) Garth Tander	Garry Rogers Motorsport	Holden Commodore (VX)	25	+ 1.93	9	66
5	5	(Australia) Glenn Seton	Glenn Seton Racing	Ford Falcon (AU)	25	+ 5.16	3	62
6	18	(New Zealand) Paul Radisich	Dick Johnson Racing	Ford Falcon (AU)	25	+ 5.47	15	58
7	29	(Australia) Paul Morris	Paul Morris Motorsport	Holden Commodore (VX)	25	+ 21.79	13	54
8	8	(Australia) Russell Ingall	Perkins Engineering	Holden Commodore (VX)	25	+ 22.12	12	50
9	35	(Australia) Jason Bargwanna	Garry Rogers Motorsport	Holden Commodore (VX)	25	+ 22.78	20	48
10	600	(Australia) John Bowe	Briggs Motorsport	Ford Falcon (AU)	25	+ 24.05	18	46
11	2	(Australia) Jason Bright	Holden Racing Team	Holden Commodore (VX)	25	+ 24.53	17	44
12	51	(New Zealand) Greg Murphy	Tom Walkinshaw Racing Australia	Holden Commodore (VX)	25	+ 24.72	10	42
13	11	(Australia) Larry Perkins	Perkins Engineering	Holden Commodore (VX)	25	+ 28.02 s	16	40
14	21	(Australia) Brad Jones	Brad Jones Racing	Ford Falcon (AU)	25	+ 28.14	23	38
15	9	(Australia) David Besnard	Stone Brothers Racing	Ford Falcon (AU)	25	+ 29.08	19	36
16	43	(Australia) Paul Weel	Paul Weel Racing	Ford Falcon (AU)	25	+ 31.22	22	34
17	75	(Australia) Anthony Tratt	Paul Little Racing	Ford Falcon (AU)	25	+ 31.74	21	32
18	10	(Australia) Mark Larkham	Larkham Motorsport	Ford Falcon (AU)	25	+ 32.38	31	30
19	3	(Australia) Cameron McConville	Lansvale Racing Team	Holden Commodore (VX)	25	+ 32.60	11	28
20	021	(New Zealand) Jason Richards	Team Kiwi Racing	Holden Commodore (VT)	25	+ 36.70	27	26
21	31	(Australia) Steven Ellery	Steven Ellery Racing	Ford Falcon (AU)	25	+ 41.69	4	24
22	50	(Australia) Tyler Mecklem	Clive Wiseman Racing	Holden Commodore (VT)	25	+ 42.89	29	22
23	7	(Australia) Rodney Forbes	Gibson Motorsport	Ford Falcon (AU)	25	+ 52.46	25	20
24	24	(Australia) Paul Romano	Romano Racing	Holden Commodore (VT)	25	+ 1:01.21	30	18
25	16	(Australia) Dugal McDougall	McDougall Motorsport	Holden Commodore (VX)	25	+ 1:11.61	28	16
26	6	(New Zealand) Steven Richards	Glenn Seton Racing	Ford Falcon (AU)	24	+ 1 lap	8	14
27	23	(Australia) Steve Reed	Lansvale Racing Team	Holden Commodore (VS)	22	+ 3 laps	32	12
Ret	15	(Australia) Todd Kelly	Tom Walkinshaw Racing Australia	Holden Commodore (VX)	23	Retired	6	
Ret	40	(Australia) Cameron McLean	Paragon Motorsport	Ford Falcon (AU)	16	Suspension	14	
Ret	4	(Australia) Marcos Ambrose	Stone Brothers Racing	Ford Falcon (AU)	9	Gearbox	2	
Ret	54	(Australia) Tony Longhurst	Rod Nash Racing	Holden Commodore (VX)	2	Retired	26	
DNS	46	(New Zealand) John Faulkner	John Faulkner Racing	Holden Commodore (VT)		Did Not Start		
Fastest Lap: Craig Lowndes (Gibson Motorsport) - 1:44.7826 on lap 7

=== Race 2 (Reverse grid) ===
Steve Reed inherited pole position by virtue of being the last-placed finisher on the road for the first race. Steven Richards, who encountered suspension issues, would start alongside him on the front row. Reed maintained the lead through turn one with Richards in tow and Dugal McDougall in close pursuit. Down the pack, Skaife sustained front-end damage after the pack converged heading into turn one on the opening lap. Murphy also suffered steering damage as he was ran up against the wall on the approach to turn one, ultimately forcing him out of the race. Cameron McConville bent a tyre rod on the exit of the front straight on the opening lap, relegating him to the pits for a lengthy stop. Richards overtook Reed at the end of the second lap to assume the race lead.

"Am I allowed to make a political comment? Reverse grid races are rubbish."

— Neil Crompton commenting on the reverse grid format

On lap eight, McDougall retired from the race after slamming the wall at turn eight. Elsewhere on the circuit, David Besnard sustained major damage to the left-hand side of his car and forced him out of the race. Before the safety car could be called, Craig Lowndes managed to undertake his compulsory pitstop. In this time, Paul Morris would also serve a stop-go penalty for a driving infringement. On his out lap, Lowndes suffered a major lockup at turn 11. A concertina effect on the exit of turn one between Reed, Rodney Forbes and Mark Skaife saw the latter sustain significant damage to the front end of the car. With the guard eating into the tyre, Skaife was resigned to the pitlane where he lost multiple laps to repair the damage. The safety car was called on lap 13 after McLean slammed the wall at the bus stop owing to front-right suspension failure.

Shortly after the race resumed, Morris spun Larry Perkins, who was several laps down, and the veteran would retire from the race soon after. Morris was issued his second stop-go penalty of the race for his role in the incident. Skaife rejoined the race on lap 19 to salvage some points. Contact between McConville and Brad Jones saw the OzEmail Falcon slam the wall at the final corner. With the car stranded, the safety car was called once again.

Ambrose had made a remarkable recovery drive from 30th on the grid to second, behind Richards. For the final three laps, Ambrose continued to pressure Richards for the lead. With few places to pass and not enough of a pace deficit to effect an maneuver, Richards took the victory with Ambrose second and Jason Bargwanna in third.

Pos	No	Driver	Team	Car	Laps	Time	Grid	Points
1	6	(New Zealand) Steven Richards	Glenn Seton Racing	Ford Falcon (AU)	25	50min 49.9364sec	2	90
2	4	(Australia) Marcos Ambrose	Stone Brothers Racing	Ford Falcon (AU)	25	+ 0.54	30	80
3	35	(Australia) Jason Bargwanna	Garry Rogers Motorsport	Holden Commodore (VX)	25	+ 0.66	19	72
4	18	(New Zealand) Paul Radisich	Dick Johnson Racing	Ford Falcon (AU)	25	+ 1.15	22	66
5	600	(Australia) John Bowe	Briggs Motorsport	Ford Falcon (AU)	25	+ 3.17	18	62
6	00	(Australia) Craig Lowndes	Gibson Motorsport	Ford Falcon (AU)	25	+ 4.09	26	58
7	34	(Australia) Garth Tander	Garry Rogers Motorsport	Holden Commodore (VX)	25	+ 4.30	24	54
8	43	(Australia) Paul Weel	Paul Weel Racing	Ford Falcon (AU)	25	+ 5.40	12	50
9	10	(Australia) Mark Larkham	Larkham Motorsport	Ford Falcon (AU)	25	+ 6.95	10	48
10	7	(Australia) Rodney Forbes	Gibson Motorsport	Ford Falcon (AU)	25	+ 7.11	5	46
11	8	(Australia) Russell Ingall	Perkins Engineering	Holden Commodore (VX)	25	+ 7.43	20	44
12	17	(Australia) Steven Johnson	Dick Johnson Racing	Ford Falcon (AU)	25	+ 8.54	27	42
13	5	(Australia) Glenn Seton	Glenn Seton Racing	Ford Falcon (AU)	25	+ 9.06	23	40
14	2	(Australia) Jason Bright	Holden Racing Team	Holden Commodore (VX)	25	+ 9.60	17	38
15	021	(New Zealand) Jason Richards	Team Kiwi Racing	Holden Commodore (VT)	25	+ 9.81	8	36
16	31	(Australia) Steven Ellery	Steven Ellery Racing	Ford Falcon (AU)	25	+ 12.42	7	34
17	23	(Australia) Steve Reed	Lansvale Racing Team	Holden Commodore (VS)	25	+ 12.52	1	32
18	15	(Australia) Todd Kelly	Tom Walkinshaw Racing Australia	Holden Commodore (VX)	25	+ 14.50	28	30
19	75	(Australia) Anthony Tratt	Paul Little Racing	Ford Falcon (AU)	25	+ 15.40	11	28
20	50	(Australia) Tyler Mecklem	Clive Wiseman Racing	Holden Commodore (VT)	24	+ 1 lap	6	26
21	29	(Australia) Paul Morris	Paul Morris Motorsport	Holden Commodore (VX)	24	+ 1 lap	21	24
22	24	(Australia) Paul Romano	Romano Racing	Holden Commodore (VX)	24	+ 1 lap	4	22
23	54	(Australia) Tony Longhurst	Rod Nash Racing	Holden Commodore (VX)	22	+ 3 laps	31	20
24	1	(Australia) Mark Skaife	Holden Racing Team	Holden Commodore (VX)	19	+ 6 laps	25	18
Ret	21	(Australia) Brad Jones	Brad Jones Racing	Ford Falcon (AU)	19	Accident	14	
Ret	3	(Australia) Cameron McConville	Lansvale Racing Team	Holden Commodore (VX)	17	Collision damage	9	
Ret	40	(Australia) Cameron McLean	Paragon Motorsport	Ford Falcon (AU)	12	Suspension / Accident	29	
Ret	11	(Australia) Larry Perkins	Perkins Engineering	Holden Commodore (VX)	12	Retired	15	
Ret	9	(Australia) David Besnard	Stone Brothers Racing	Ford Falcon (AU)	8	Collision damage	13	
Ret	16	(Australia) Dugal McDougall	McDougall Motorsport	Holden Commodore (VX)	7	Accident / Fire	3	
Ret	51	(New Zealand) Greg Murphy	Tom Walkinshaw Racing Australia	Holden Commodore (VX)	2	Steering	16	
DNS	46	(New Zealand) John Faulkner	John Faulkner Racing	Holden Commodore (VT)		Did not start		
Fastest Lap: Marcos Ambrose (Stone Brothers Racing) - 1:44.1802 on lap 13

=== Race 3 ===
Dugal McDougall and Cameron McLean failed to make the start owing to the damage sustained in the second race earlier that day. John Faulkner meanwhile had managed to repair his car following his shunt in Saturday practice to line up for this third and final race.

Radisich made a better start than pole sitter Lowndes to take the lead into turn one. Perkins, Jason Richards and Steven Ellery were the first cars to pit. Both Skaife and Ambrose pit just one lap later to take themselves out of the traffic. Tony Longhurst retired with extensive damage to the front end of his car. On lap six, Bargwanna collided with the outside wall exiting the bus stop, bending the front-left suspension and was forced to retire from the race. For the third time this weekend, Morris would serve a stop-go penalty, this time for speeding in pitlane. Steven Richards served a stop-go penalty for the same offence. Teammate Seton lost two laps while he pitted to amend a bent front-left steering arm. Radisich experienced an inexplicable loss of speed exiting the bus stop which saw him lose the lead to Lowndes.

"If Faulkner had a duck, it would drown."

— Barry Sheene on John Faulkner's bad luck

The safety car was deployed on lap 16 when Faulkner was left stranded at the final chicane after being spun by Russell Ingall. Faulkner stalled the car and was unable to re-fire it for some time. He eventually was able to bump start with some help from the marshals to rejoin the race. Prior to this, Gibson Motorsport had withheld Lowndes' second stop in lieu of clear air. With this safety car, the gamble on strategy did not pay off. Besnard damaged the front-right of his Falcon and ended his day on lap 19.

Lowndes drove away on the restart in an effort of damage limitation after the safety car annihilated his strategy. Ambrose was the first of the drivers to have made both pitstops with Skaife in hot pursuit. When Ambrose came up to put Anthony Tratt another lap down, the latter ignored blue flags for two laps, failed to give way, and contact at turn six allowed Skaife to cycle through and claim the effective lead from the Tasmanian. Lowndes finally made his second pitstop at the end of lap 28. Greg Murphy retired from the race on lap 31 after his power steering failed. At the end of lap 36, Ambrose made an unscheduled pitstop for tyres. Soon thereafter, Lowndes retired from the race when he encountered fuel pressure problems at the exit of turn one. With the car stranded, the safety car was brought out. Paul Weel also retired after a rock severed the fuel line.

Skaife led the pack on the restart with Tander and Johnson in tow. Tander appeared to attempt to back Johnson up toward Bright, a tactic which could potentially have yielded a round victory for the Garry Rogers Motorsport pilot. Things went from bad to worse for Ambrose after his left-rear wheel came adrift from his car, pulling off to the side of the road to retire. The wheel continued to roll down Flynn Drive for a couple hundred meters before bouncing on top of a tyre bundle in comedic circumstances.

Skaife claimed the chequered flag in an unobstructed run to the finish. Tander finished in second and Johnson third. Johnson would also claim his first V8 Supercar round victory, as well as Dick Johnson Racing's first round win of the season.

Pos	No	Driver	Team	Car	Laps	Time	Grid	Points
1	1	(Australia) Mark Skaife	Holden Racing Team	Holden Commodore (VX)	50	1hr 36min 27.5354sec	1	180
2	34	(Australia) Garth Tander	Garry Rogers Motorsport	Holden Commodore (VX)	50	+ 7.70	3	160
3	17	(Australia) Steven Johnson	Dick Johnson Racing	Ford Falcon (AU)	50	+ 8.27	5	144
4	2	(Australia) Jason Bright	Holden Racing Team	Holden Commodore (VX)	50	+ 8.84	10	132
5	600	(Australia) John Bowe	Briggs Motor Sport	Ford Falcon (AU)	50	+ 9.20	6	124
6	31	(Australia) Steven Ellery	Steven Ellery Racing	Ford Falcon (AU)	50	+ 11.82	19	116
7	18	(New Zealand) Paul Radisich	Dick Johnson Racing	Ford Falcon (AU)	50	+ 14.06	2	108
8	10	(Australia) Mark Larkham	Larkham Motorsport	Ford Falcon (AU)	50	+ 18.23	12	100
9	8	(Australia) Russell Ingall	Perkins Engineering	Holden Commodore (VX)	50	+ 18.48	8	96
10	6	(New Zealand) Steven Richards	Glenn Seton Racing	Ford Falcon (AU)	50	+ 19.60	13	92
11	29	(Australia) Paul Morris	Paul Morris Motorsport	Holden Commodore (VX)	50	+ 24.21	14	88
12	11	(Australia) Larry Perkins	Perkins Engineering	Holden Commodore (VX)	50	+ 27.23	21	84
13	3	(Australia) Cameron McConville	Lansvale Racing Team	Holden Commodore (VX)	50	+ 35.40	26	80
14	7	(Australia) Rodney Forbes	Gibson Motorsport	Ford Falcon (AU)	50	+ 36.94	16	76
15	23	(Australia) Steve Reed	Lansvale Racing Team	Holden Commodore (VS)	50	+ 46.65	24	72
16	15	(Australia) Todd Kelly	Tom Walkinshaw Racing Australia	Holden Commodore (VX)	50	+ 1:07.80	27	68
17	50	(Australia) Tyler Mecklem	Clive Wiseman Racing	Holden Commodore (VX)	49	+ 1 lap	22	64
18	24	(Australia) Paul Romano	Romano Racing	Holden Commodore (VX)	49	+ 1 lap	28	60
19	5	(Australia) Glenn Seton	Glenn Seton Racing	Ford Falcon (AU)	48	+ 2 laps	7	56
20	46	(New Zealand) John Faulkner	John Faulkner Racing	Holden Commodore (VT)	48	+ 2 laps	32	52
21	021	(New Zealand) Jason Richards	Team Kiwi Racing	Holden Commodore (VT)	42	+ 8 laps	17	48
Ret	4	(Australia) Marcos Ambrose	Stone Brothers Racing	Ford Falcon (AU)	45	Wheel	15	
Ret	21	(Australia) Brad Jones	Brad Jones Racing	Ford Falcon (AU)	42	Retired	20	
Ret	75	(Australia) Anthony Tratt	Paul Little Racing	Ford Falcon (AU)	38	Retired	18	
Ret	00	(Australia) Craig Lowndes	Gibson Motorsport	Ford Falcon (AU)	35	Fuel Pressure	1	
Ret	43	(Australia) Paul Weel	Paul Weel Racing	Ford Falcon (AU)	34	Brake line	9	
Ret	51	(New Zealand) Greg Murphy	Tom Walkinshaw Racing Australia	Holden Commodore (VX)	31	Power steering	23	
Ret	9	(Australia) David Besnard	Stone Brothers Racing	Ford Falcon (AU)	19	Suspension	25	
Ret	35	(Australia) Jason Bargwanna	Garry Rogers Motorsport	Holden Commodore (VX)	6	Crash damage	4	
Ret	54	(Australia) Tony Longhurst	Rod Nash Racing	Holden Commodore (VX)	5	Crash damage	29	
DNS	16	(Australia) Dugal McDougall	McDougall Motorsport	Holden Commodore (VX)		Did not start	30	
DNS	40	(Australia) Cameron McLean	Paragon Motorsport	Ford Falcon (AU)		Did not start	31	
Fastest Lap: Craig Lowndes (Gibson Motorsport) - 1:43.8397 on lap 29

== Championship points ==
Round points tally

Pos.	No	Driver	Team	Pts
1	17	(Australia) Steven Johnson	Dick Johnson Racing	294
2	34	(Australia) Garth Tander	Garry Rogers Motorsport	288
3	1	(Australia) Mark Skaife	Holden Racing Team	282
4=	18	(New Zealand) Paul Radisich	Dick Johnson Racing	232
4=	600	(Australia) John Bowe	Briggs Motorsport	232

Drivers' Championship standings after Round 5

Pos.	No	Driver	Team	Pts
1	1	(Australia) Mark Skaife	Holden Racing Team	1360
2	2	(Australia) Jason Bright	Holden Racing Team	1346
3	17	(Australia) Steven Johnson	Dick Johnson Racing	1082
4	8	(Australia) Russell Ingall	Perkins Engineering	1079
5	4	(Australia) Marcos Ambrose	Stone Brothers Racing	986
