= José Fernández (racing driver) =

Australian racing driver (born 1968)

- Nationality: Australian
- Born: José Luís Fernández; 26 July 1968 (age 58) Sydney, New South Wales

V8 Supercars
- Years active: 2003, 2005–2006
- Starts: 24
- Wins: 0
- Poles: 0
- Fastest laps: 0
- Best finish: 30th in 2006

José Luís Fernández (born 26 July 1968 in Sydney) is an Australian racing driver. He competed for Britek Motorsport in V8 Supercars during the 2006 season. Fernández still operates his own racing team, mostly in minor GT championships racing Porsches.

== Career results ==
Season	Series	Position	Car	Team
2003	Konica V8 Supercar Series	15th	Ford Falcon AU	Fernandez Racing
2003	V8 Supercar Championship Series	NC	Ford Falcon AU	Fernandez Racing
2004	Konica Minolta V8 Supercar Series	4th	Ford Falcon AU	Dick Johnson Racing
2005	HPDC V8 Supercar Series	7th	Ford Falcon BA	Britek Motorsport
2005	V8 Supercar Championship Series	58th	Ford Falcon BA	Britek Motorsport
2006	V8 Supercar Championship Series	30th	Ford Falcon BA	Britek Motorsport
2007	Fujitsu V8 Supercar Series	8th	Ford Falcon BA	Prodigy Motorsport
2008	Fujitsu V8 Supercar Series	42nd	Ford Falcon BA	Race Image Motorsport

=== Supercars Championship results ===
(key) (Races in bold indicate pole position) (Races in italics indicate fastest lap)

Supercars results
Year	Team	Car	1	2	3	4	5	6	7	8	9	10	11	12	13	14	15	16	17	18	19	20	21	22	23	24	25	26	27	28	29	30	31	32	33	34	Position	Points
2003	Fernández Racing	Ford Falcon AU	ADE; R1	ADE; R2	PHI	ECK1	WIN	PER; R1	PER; R2	PER; R3	DAR; R1	DAR; R2	DAR; R3	IPS	OPK	SAN	BAT; Ret	GCS; R1	GCS; R2	PUK; R1	PUK; R2	PUK; R3	ECK2; R1	ECK2; R2													NC	0
2005	Britek Motorsport	Ford Falcon BA	ADE; R1	ADE; R2	PUK; R1	PUK; R2	PUK; R3	PER; R1	PER; R2	PER; R3	ECK; R1	ECK; R2	SHA; R1	SHA; R2	SHA; R3	DAR; R1	DAR; R2	DAR; R3	IPS	OPK; R1	OPK; R2	SAN; 24	BAT; 17	GCS; R1	GCS; R2	GCS; R3	LAU; R1	LAU; R2	LAU; R3	PHI; R1	PHI; R2	PHI; R3					58th	128
2006	Britek Motorsport	Ford Falcon BA	ADE; R1; 13	ADE; R2; 23	PUK; R1	PUK; R2	PUK; R3	PER; R1	PER; R2	PER; R3	WIN; R1; 26	WIN; R2; 24	WIN; R3; 26	DAR; R1	DAR; R2	DAR; R3	IPS; R1; 26	IPS; R2; 22	IPS; R3; Ret	OPK; R1; 27	OPK; R2; 20	OPK; R3; 22	SAN; 22	BAT; 16	GCS; R1; Ret	GCS; R2; Ret	GCS; R3; DNS	LAU; R1	LAU; R2	LAU; R3	BHR; R1; Ret	BHR; R2; 23	BHR; R3; 25	PHI; R1; 29	PHI; R2; 28	PHI; R3; 27	30th	658

=== Bathurst 1000 results ===
Year	Team	Car	Co-driver	Position	Laps
2003	Fernández Racing	Ford Falcon AU	(Australia) David Russell	NC	113
2005	Britek Motorsport	Ford Falcon BA	(Australia) Damien White	17th	148
2006	Britek Motorsport	Ford Falcon BA	(Australia) Tony Ricciardello	16th	159
