= 2006 Darwin Triple Crown =

2006 Supercar Championship event

(Australia) 2006 Darwin Triple Crown
Event Information
- Round 5 of 13 in the 2006 V8 Supercar Championship Series
- Date: 30 June–2 July 2006
- Location: Darwin, Northern Territory
- Venue: Hidden Valley Raceway
- Weather: Fine

Results
Race 1
| Distance | 34 laps | 97.580 km |
| Pole position | (Australia) Jason Bright; Ford Performance Racing | 1:09.0322 |
| Winner | (Australia) Mark Skaife; Holden Racing Team | 41:07.5941 |
Race 2
| Distance | 48 laps | 137.760 km |
| Winner | (Australia) Jason Bright; Ford Performance Racing | 1:00:37.8417 |
Race 3
| Distance | 48 laps | 137.760 km |
| Winner | (Australia) Craig Lowndes; Triple Eight Race Engineering | 57:53.3776 |
Round Results
| First | (Australia) Craig Lowndes; Triple Eight Race Engineering | 304 pts |
| Second | (Australia) Garth Tander; HSV Dealer Team | 282 pts |
| Third | (Australia) Rick Kelly; HSV Dealer Team | 282 pts |

The 2006 Darwin Triple Crown (commercially known as the 2006 Skycity Triple Crown) was a motor race for V8 Supercars held on the weekend of 30 June–2 July 2006. The event was held at the Hidden Valley Raceway in Darwin, Northern Territory, and consisted of three races culminating in 373 kilometres. It was the fifth round of thirteen in the 2006 V8 Supercar Championship Series.

== Background ==
Tony Ricciardello and José Fernández continued their ride-share agreement at Britek Motorsport, with the Western Australian driver taking the reins for the round. Over at Paul Morris Motorsport, Fabian Coulthard was replaced with Steven Ellery to give the former Triple 8 and Holden Young Lions driver some miles before joining Paul Morris for the Endurance rounds.

== Results ==
=== Qualifying ===
| Pos. | No. | Driver | Team | Car | Time |
|---|---|---|---|---|---|
| 1 | 2 | (Australia) Mark Skaife | Holden Racing Team | Holden Commodore VZ | 1:09.2209 |
| 2 | 6 | (Australia) Jason Bright | Ford Performance Racing | Ford Falcon BA | +0.1059 |
| 3 | 15 | (Australia) Rick Kelly | HSV Dealer Team | Holden Commodore VZ | +0.1683 |
| 4 | 16 | (Australia) Garth Tander | HSV Dealer Team | Holden Commodore VZ | +0.1814 |
| 5 | 888 | (Australia) Craig Lowndes | Triple Eight Race Engineering | Ford Falcon BA | +0.2019 |
| 6 | 7 | (New Zealand) Steven Richards | Perkins Engineering | Holden Commodore VZ | +0.2664 |
| 7 | 5 | (Australia) Mark Winterbottom | Ford Performance Racing | Ford Falcon BA | +0.3217 |
| 8 | 88 | (Australia) Jamie Whincup | Triple Eight Race Engineering | Ford Falcon BA | +0.3505 |
| 9 | 3 | (New Zealand) Jason Richards | Tasman Motorsport | Holden Commodore VZ | +0.4002 |
| 10 | 11 | (Australia) Paul Dumbrell | Perkins Engineering | Holden Commodore VZ | +0.5014 |
| 11 | 22 | (Australia) Todd Kelly | Holden Racing Team | Holden Commodore VZ | +0.5714 |
| 12 | 8 | (Brazil) Max Wilson | WPS Racing | Ford Falcon BA | +0.6388 |
| 13 | 1 | (Australia) Russell Ingall | Stone Brothers Racing | Ford Falcon BA | +0.6568 |
| 14 | 18 | (Australia) Will Davison | Dick Johnson Racing | Ford Falcon BA | +0.6955 |
| 15 | 17 | (Australia) Steven Johnson | Dick Johnson Racing | Ford Falcon BA | +0.7167 |
| 16 | 33 | (Australia) Lee Holdsworth | Garry Rogers Motorsport | Holden Commodore VZ | +0.7834 |
| 17 | 34 | (Australia) Dean Canto | Garry Rogers Motorsport | Holden Commodore VZ | +0.8980 |
| 18 | 10 | (Australia) Jason Bargwanna | WPS Racing | Ford Falcon BA | +0.9064 |
| 19 | 50 | (Australia) Cameron McConville | Paul Weel Racing | Holden Commodore VZ | +0.9153 |
| 20 | 25 | (Australia) Warren Luff | Britek Motorsport | Ford Falcon BA | +0.9207 |
| 21 | 4 | (Australia) James Courtney | Stone Brothers Racing | Ford Falcon BA | +0.9404 |
| 22 | 55 | (Australia) Steve Owen | Rod Nash Racing | Holden Commodore VZ | +0.9555 |
| 23 | 021 | (New Zealand) Paul Radisich | Team Kiwi Racing | Holden Commodore VZ | +0.9602 |
| 24 | 39 | (Australia) Steven Ellery | Paul Morris Motorsport | Holden Commodore VZ | +0.9888 |
| 25 | 51 | (New Zealand) Greg Murphy | Paul Weel Racing | Holden Commodore VZ | +1.0429 |
| 26 | 23 | (Australia) Andrew Jones | Tasman Motorsport | Holden Commodore VZ | +1.1152 |
| 27 | 67 | (Australia) Paul Morris | Paul Morris Motorsport | Holden Commodore VZ | +1.1942 |
| 28 | 14 | (Australia) Brad Jones | Brad Jones Racing | Ford Falcon BA | +1.2027 |
| 29 | 12 | (Australia) John Bowe | Brad Jones Racing | Ford Falcon BA | +1.2485 |
| 30 | 20 | (Australia) Marcus Marshall | Paul Cruickshank Racing | Ford Falcon BA | +1.6635 |
| 31 | 26 | (Australia) Tony Ricciardello | Britek Motorsport | Ford Falcon BA | +2.7183 |

=== Top Ten Shootout ===
| Pos. | No. | Driver | Team | Car | Time |
|---|---|---|---|---|---|
| 1 | 6 | (Australia) Jason Bright | Ford Performance Racing | Ford Falcon BA | 1:09.0322 |
| 2 | 2 | (Australia) Mark Skaife | Holden Racing Team | Holden Commodore VZ | +0.1933 |
| 3 | 16 | (Australia) Garth Tander | HSV Dealer Team | Holden Commodore VZ | +0.3428 |
| 4 | 15 | (Australia) Rick Kelly | HSV Dealer Team | Holden Commodore VZ | +0.4601 |
| 5 | 5 | (Australia) Mark Winterbottom | Ford Performance Racing | Ford Falcon BA | +0.8121 |
| 6 | 888 | (Australia) Craig Lowndes | Triple Eight Race Engineering | Ford Falcon BA | +0.8517 |
| 7 | 7 | (New Zealand) Steven Richards | Perkins Engineering | Holden Commodore VZ | +0.8991 |
| 8 | 3 | (New Zealand) Jason Richards | Tasman Motorsport | Holden Commodore VZ | +1.2354 |
| 9 | 11 | (Australia) Paul Dumbrell | Perkins Engineering | Holden Commodore VZ | +1.2988 |
| 10 | 88 | (Australia) Jamie Whincup | Triple Eight Race Engineering | Ford Falcon BA | +1.8832 |

=== Race 1 ===
| Pos. | No. | Driver | Team | Car | Laps | Time/Retired | Grid | Pts. |
|---|---|---|---|---|---|---|---|---|
| 1 | 2 | (Australia) Mark Skaife | Holden Racing Team | Holden Commodore VZ | 34 | 41:07.5941 | 2 | 128 |
| 2 | 15 | (Australia) Rick Kelly | HSV Dealer Team | Holden Commodore VZ | 34 | +0.7129 | 4 | 124 |
| 3 | 5 | (Australia) Mark Winterbottom | Ford Performance Racing | Ford Falcon BA | 34 | +7.0965 | 5 | 120 |
| 4 | 888 | (Australia) Craig Lowndes | Triple Eight Race Engineering | Ford Falcon BA | 34 | +7.5325 | 6 | 116 |
| 5 | 16 | (Australia) Garth Tander | HSV Dealer Team | Holden Commodore VZ | 34 | +8.0885 | 3 | 112 |
| 6 | 3 | (New Zealand) Jason Richards | Tasman Motorsport | Holden Commodore VZ | 34 | +9.0829 | 8 | 108 |
| 7 | 7 | (New Zealand) Steven Richards | Perkins Engineering | Holden Commodore VZ | 34 | +15.8107 | 7 | 104 |
| 8 | 11 | (Australia) Paul Dumbrell | Perkins Engineering | Holden Commodore VZ | 34 | +20.1872 | 9 | 100 |
| 9 | 88 | (Australia) Jamie Whincup | Triple Eight Race Engineering | Ford Falcon BA | 34 | +20.3913 | 10 | 96 |
| 10 | 1 | (Australia) Russell Ingall | Stone Brothers Racing | Ford Falcon BA | 34 | +20.4100 | 13 | 92 |
| 11 | 8 | (Brazil) Max Wilson | WPS Racing | Ford Falcon BA | 34 | +25.1455 | 12 | 88 |
| 12 | 22 | (Australia) Todd Kelly | Holden Racing Team | Holden Commodore VZ | 34 | +26.1139 | 11 | 84 |
| 13 | 18 | (Australia) Will Davison | Dick Johnson Racing | Ford Falcon BA | 34 | +27.7013 | 14 | 80 |
| 14 | 34 | (Australia) Dean Canto | Garry Rogers Motorsport | Holden Commodore VZ | 34 | +35.4905 | 17 | 76 |
| 15 | 50 | (Australia) Cameron McConville | Paul Weel Racing | Holden Commodore VZ | 34 | +36.4059 | 19 | 72 |
| 16 | 4 | (Australia) James Courtney | Stone Brothers Racing | Ford Falcon BA | 34 | +41.2966 | 21 | 68 |
| 17 | 55 | (Australia) Steve Owen | Rod Nash Racing | Holden Commodore VZ | 34 | +42.9231 | 22 | 64 |
| 18 | 021 | (New Zealand) Paul Radisich | Team Kiwi Racing | Holden Commodore VZ | 34 | +43.9555 | 23 | 60 |
| 19 | 67 | (Australia) Paul Morris | Paul Morris Motorsport | Holden Commodore VZ | 34 | +44.4760 | 27 | 56 |
| 20 | 12 | (Australia) John Bowe | Brad Jones Racing | Ford Falcon BA | 34 | +47.6054 | 29 | 52 |
| 21 | 10 | (Australia) Jason Bargwanna | WPS Racing | Ford Falcon BA | 34 | +54.2141 | 18 | 48 |
| 22 | 20 | (Australia) Marcus Marshall | Paul Cruickshank Racing | Ford Falcon BA | 34 | +54.6820 | 30 | 44 |
| 23 | 23 | (Australia) Andrew Jones | Tasman Motorsport | Holden Commodore VZ | 34 | +58.1023 | 26 | 40 |
| 24 | 6 | (Australia) Jason Bright | Ford Performance Racing | Ford Falcon BA | 34 | +57.4819 | 1 | 36 |
| 25 | 14 | (Australia) Brad Jones | Brad Jones Racing | Ford Falcon BA | 34 | +1:04.0166 | 28 | 32 |
| 26 | 51 | (New Zealand) Greg Murphy | Paul Weel Racing | Holden Commodore VZ | 34 | +1:04.4029 | 25 | 28 |
| 27 | 39 | (Australia) Steven Ellery | Paul Morris Motorsport | Holden Commodore VZ | 33 | +1 lap | 24 | 24 |
| 28 | 33 | (Australia) Lee Holdsworth | Garry Rogers Motorsport | Holden Commodore VZ | 33 | +1 lap | 16 | 20 |
| 29 | 17 | (Australia) Steven Johnson | Dick Johnson Racing | Ford Falcon BA | 30 | +4 laps | 15 | 16 |
| 30 | 26 | (Australia) Tony Ricciardello | Britek Motorsport | Ford Falcon BA | 30 | +4 laps | 31 | 12 |
| 31 | 25 | (Australia) Warren Luff | Britek Motorsport | Ford Falcon BA | 28 | +6 laps | 20 | 8 |
Fastest lap: Jason Bright (Ford Performance Racing), 1:10.2958

=== Race 2 ===
| Pos. | No. | Driver | Team | Car | Laps | Time/Retired | Grid | Pts. |
|---|---|---|---|---|---|---|---|---|
| 1 | 6 | (Australia) Jason Bright | Ford Performance Racing | Ford Falcon BA | 48 | 1:00:37.8417 | 8 | 64 |
| 2 | 17 | (Australia) Steven Johnson | Dick Johnson Racing | Ford Falcon BA | 48 | +4.2865 | 3 | 62 |
| 3 | 888 | (Australia) Craig Lowndes | Triple Eight Race Engineering | Ford Falcon BA | 48 | +4.4378 | 28 | 60 |
| 4 | 25 | (Australia) Warren Luff | Britek Motorsport | Ford Falcon BA | 48 | +8.7889 | 1 | 58 |
| 5 | 88 | (Australia) Jamie Whincup | Triple Eight Race Engineering | Ford Falcon BA | 48 | +8.8545 | 23 | 56 |
| 6 | 4 | (Australia) James Courtney | Stone Brothers Racing | Ford Falcon BA | 48 | +13.9154 | 16 | 54 |
| 7 | 1 | (Australia) Russell Ingall | Stone Brothers Racing | Ford Falcon BA | 48 | +16.8845 | 22 | 52 |
| 8 | 16 | (Australia) Garth Tander | HSV Dealer Team | Holden Commodore VZ | 48 | +19.5985 | 27 | 50 |
| 9 | 51 | (New Zealand) Greg Murphy | Paul Weel Racing | Holden Commodore VZ | 48 | +21.1143 | 6 | 48 |
| 10 | 15 | (Australia) Rick Kelly | HSV Dealer Team | Holden Commodore VZ | 48 | +23.3676 | 30 | 46 |
| 11 | 10 | (Australia) Jason Bargwanna | WPS Racing | Ford Falcon BA | 48 | +30.4223 | 11 | 44 |
| 12 | 23 | (Australia) Andrew Jones | Tasman Motorsport | Holden Commodore VZ | 48 | +33.3197 | 9 | 42 |
| 13 | 12 | (Australia) John Bowe | Brad Jones Racing | Ford Falcon BA | 48 | +34.0939 | 12 | 40 |
| 14 | 3 | (New Zealand) Jason Richards | Tasman Motorsport | Holden Commodore VZ | 48 | +34.4836 | 26 | 38 |
| 15 | 39 | (Australia) Steven Ellery | Paul Morris Motorsport | Holden Commodore VZ | 48 | +34.9400 | 5 | 36 |
| 16 | 50 | (Australia) Cameron McConville | Paul Weel Racing | Holden Commodore VZ | 48 | +37.4191 | 17 | 34 |
| 17 | 5 | (Australia) Mark Winterbottom | Ford Performance Racing | Ford Falcon BA | 48 | +38.3702 | 29 | 32 |
| 18 | 67 | (Australia) Paul Morris | Paul Morris Motorsport | Holden Commodore VZ | 48 | +47.3897 | 13 | 30 |
| 19 | 34 | (Australia) Dean Canto | Garry Rogers Motorsport | Holden Commodore VZ | 48 | +47.7391 | 18 | 28 |
| 20 | 33 | (Australia) Lee Holdsworth | Garry Rogers Motorsport | Holden Commodore VZ | 48 | +52.1716 | 4 | 26 |
| 21 | 021 | (New Zealand) Paul Radisich | Team Kiwi Racing | Holden Commodore VZ | 48 | +53.0294 | 14 | 24 |
| 22 | 7 | (New Zealand) Steven Richards | Perkins Engineering | Holden Commodore VZ | 48 | +53.5062 | 25 | 22 |
| 23 | 26 | (Australia) Tony Ricciardello | Britek Motorsport | Ford Falcon BA | 48 | +1:12.0275 | 2 | 20 |
| 24 | 55 | (Australia) Steve Owen | Rod Nash Racing | Holden Commodore VZ | 47 | +1 lap | 15 | 18 |
| 25 | 14 | (Australia) Brad Jones | Brad Jones Racing | Ford Falcon BA | 47 | +1 lap | 7 | 16 |
| 26 | 20 | (Australia) Marcus Marshall | Paul Cruickshank Racing | Ford Falcon BA | 46 | +2 laps | 10 | 14 |
| 27 | 22 | (Australia) Todd Kelly | Holden Racing Team | Holden Commodore VZ | 46 | +2 laps | 20 | 12 |
| 28 | 2 | (Australia) Mark Skaife | Holden Racing Team | Holden Commodore VZ | 40 | +8 laps | 31 | 10 |
| Ret | 11 | (Australia) Paul Dumbrell | Perkins Engineering | Holden Commodore VZ | 44 | Engine | 24 | |
| Ret | 18 | (Australia) Will Davison | Dick Johnson Racing | Ford Falcon BA | 7 | Suspension | 19 | |
| Ret | 8 | (Brazil) Max Wilson | WPS Racing | Ford Falcon BA | 1 | Crash | 21 | |
Fastest lap: Mark Winterbottom (Ford Performance Racing), 1:10.1260

=== Race 3 ===
| Pos. | No. | Driver | Team | Car | Laps | Time/Retired | Grid | Pts. |
|---|---|---|---|---|---|---|---|---|
| 1 | 888 | (Australia) Craig Lowndes | Triple Eight Race Engineering | Ford Falcon BA | 48 | 57:53.3776 | 1 | 128 |
| 2 | 3 | (New Zealand) Jason Richards | Tasman Motorsport | Holden Commodore VZ | 48 | +3.8061 | 6 | 124 |
| 3 | 16 | (Australia) Garth Tander | HSV Dealer Team | Holden Commodore VZ | 48 | +11.1495 | 3 | 120 |
| 4 | 6 | (Australia) Jason Bright | Ford Performance Racing | Ford Falcon BA | 48 | +18.6505 | 13 | 116 |
| 5 | 15 | (Australia) Rick Kelly | HSV Dealer Team | Holden Commodore VZ | 48 | +22.4292 | 2 | 112 |
| 6 | 2 | (Australia) Mark Skaife | Holden Racing Team | Holden Commodore VZ | 48 | +22.9175 | 8 | 108 |
| 7 | 50 | (Australia) Cameron McConville | Paul Weel Racing | Holden Commodore VZ | 48 | +30.2204 | 11 | 104 |
| 8 | 5 | (Australia) Mark Winterbottom | Ford Performance Racing | Ford Falcon BA | 48 | +31.6249 | 5 | 100 |
| 9 | 1 | (Australia) Russell Ingall | Stone Brothers Racing | Ford Falcon BA | 48 | +32.0663 | 7 | 96 |
| 10 | 10 | (Australia) Jason Bargwanna | WPS Racing | Ford Falcon BA | 48 | +53.1736 | 16 | 92 |
| 11 | 021 | (New Zealand) Paul Radisich | Team Kiwi Racing | Holden Commodore VZ | 48 | +55.9518 | 20 | 88 |
| 12 | 51 | (New Zealand) Greg Murphy | Paul Weel Racing | Holden Commodore VZ | 48 | +59.0870 | 25 | 84 |
| 13 | 11 | (Australia) Paul Dumbrell | Perkins Engineering | Holden Commodore VZ | 48 | +59.5624 | 14 | 80 |
| 14 | 18 | (Australia) Will Davison | Dick Johnson Racing | Ford Falcon BA | 48 | +59.7202 | 23 | 76 |
| 15 | 17 | (Australia) Steven Johnson | Dick Johnson Racing | Ford Falcon BA | 48 | +59.8438 | 24 | 72 |
| 16 | 8 | (Brazil) Max Wilson | WPS Racing | Ford Falcon BA | 48 | +1:02.5628 | 18 | 68 |
| 17 | 23 | (Australia) Andrew Jones | Tasman Motorsport | Holden Commodore VZ | 48 | +1:03.1333 | 21 | 64 |
| 18 | 55 | (Australia) Steve Owen | Rod Nash Racing | Holden Commodore VZ | 48 | +1:04.0363 | 22 | 60 |
| 19 | 33 | (Australia) Lee Holdsworth | Garry Rogers Motorsport | Holden Commodore VZ | 48 | +1:08.5552 | 30 | 56 |
| 20 | 34 | (Australia) Dean Canto | Garry Rogers Motorsport | Holden Commodore VZ | 48 | +1:09.0656 | 12 | 52 |
| 21 | 12 | (Australia) John Bowe | Brad Jones Racing | Ford Falcon BA | 48 | +1:10.0106 | 17 | 48 |
| 22 | 22 | (Australia) Todd Kelly | Holden Racing Team | Holden Commodore VZ | 48 | +1:13.8512 | 15 | 44 |
| 23 | 4 | (Australia) James Courtney | Stone Brothers Racing | Ford Falcon BA | 48 | +1:25.8256 | 10 | 40 |
| 24 | 14 | (Australia) Brad Jones | Brad Jones Racing | Ford Falcon BA | 47 | +1 lap | 29 | 36 |
| 25 | 20 | (Australia) Marcus Marshall | Paul Cruickshank Racing | Ford Falcon BA | 47 | +1 lap | 28 | 32 |
| 26 | 88 | (Australia) Jamie Whincup | Triple Eight Race Engineering | Ford Falcon BA | 47 | +1 lap | 4 | 28 |
| 27 | 25 | (Australia) Warren Luff | Britek Motorsport | Ford Falcon BA | 47 | +1 lap | 26 | 24 |
| 28 | 7 | (New Zealand) Steven Richards | Perkins Engineering | Holden Commodore VZ | 38 | +10 laps | 9 | 20 |
| 29 | 26 | (Australia) Tony Ricciardello | Britek Motorsport | Ford Falcon BA | 38 | +10 laps | 31 | 16 |
| Ret | 39 | (Australia) Steven Ellery | Paul Morris Motorsport | Holden Commodore VZ | 19 | | 27 | |
| Ret | 67 | (Australia) Paul Morris | Paul Morris Motorsport | Holden Commodore VZ | 1 | Crash | 19 | |
Fastest lap: Jason Bright (Ford Performance Racing), 1:10.2851

== Round standings ==
| Pos. | Driver | R1 | R2 | R3 | Total |
|---|---|---|---|---|---|
| 1 | (Australia) Craig Lowndes | 4 | 3 | 1 | 304 |
| 2 | (Australia) Garth Tander | 5 | 8 | 3 | 282 |
| = | (Australia) Rick Kelly | 2 | 10 | 5 | 282 |
| 4 | (New Zealand) Jason Richards | 6 | 14 | 2 | 270 |
| 5 | (Australia) Mark Winterbottom | 3 | 17 | 18 | 252 |
| 6 | (Australia) Mark Skaife | 1 | 28 | 6 | 246 |
| 7 | (Australia) Russell Ingall | 10 | 7 | 9 | 240 |
| 8 | (Australia) Jason Bright | 24 | 1 | 4 | 216 |
| 9 | (Australia) Cameron McConville | 15 | 16 | 7 | 210 |
| 10 | (Australia) Jason Bargwanna | 21 | 11 | 10 | 184 |
| 11 | (Australia) Paul Dumbrell | 8 | Ret | 13 | 180 |
| = | (Australia) Jamie Whincup | 9 | 5 | 26 | 180 |
| 13 | (New Zealand) Paul Radisich | 18 | 21 | 11 | 172 |
| 14 | (Australia) James Courtney | 16 | 6 | 23 | 162 |
| 15 | (New Zealand) Greg Murphy | 26 | 9 | 12 | 160 |
| 16 | (Australia) Will Davison | 13 | Ret | 14 | 156 |
| = | (Brazil) Max Wilson | 11 | Ret | 16 | 156 |
| = | (Australia) Dean Canto | 14 | 19 | 20 | 156 |
| 19 | (Australia) Steven Johnson | 29 | 2 | 15 | 150 |
| 20 | (Australia) Andrew Jones | 23 | 12 | 17 | 146 |
| = | (New Zealand) Steven Richards | 7 | 22 | 28 | 146 |
| 22 | (Australia) Steve Owen | 17 | 24 | 18 | 142 |
| 23 | (Australia) John Bowe | 20 | 13 | 21 | 140 |
| = | (Australia) Todd Kelly | 12 | 27 | 22 | 140 |
| 25 | (Australia) Lee Holdsworth | 28 | 20 | 19 | 102 |
| 26 | (Australia) Marcus Marshall | 22 | 26 | 25 | 90 |
| = | (Australia) Warren Luff | 31 | 4 | 27 | 90 |
| 28 | (Australia) Paul Morris | 19 | 18 | Ret | 86 |
| 29 | (Australia) Brad Jones | 25 | 25 | 24 | 84 |
| 30 | (Australia) Steven Ellery | 27 | 15 | Ret | 60 |
| 31 | (Australia) Tony Ricciardello | 30 | 23 | 29 | 48 |

== Championship standings ==
| Pos. | Driver | Pts | Gap |
|---|---|---|---|
| 1 | (Australia) Garth Tander | 1324 | |
| 2 | (Australia) Craig Lowndes | 1316 | -8 |
| 3 | (Australia) Rick Kelly | 1311 | -13 |
| 4 | (Australia) Russell Ingall | 1202 | -112 |
| 5 | (Australia) Mark Winterbottom | 1191 | -123 |
