= 2006 Ipswich 400 =

Sports event held in Willowbank, Queensland, Australia

(Australia) 2006 Ipswich 400
Event Information
- Round 6 of 13 in the 2006 V8 Supercar Championship Series
- Date: 21–23 July 2006
- Location: Willowbank, Queensland, Australia
- Venue: Queensland Raceway

Results
Race 1
Distance	32 laps	100.032 km
Pole position	(Australia) Garth Tander; HSV Dealer Team	1:10.3713
Winner	(Australia) Garth Tander; HSV Dealer Team	39:57.9354
Race 2
Distance	45 laps	140.670 km
Winner	(Australia) Mark Skaife; Holden Racing Team	57:49.9456
Race 3
Distance	45 laps	140.670 km
Winner	(Australia) Garth Tander; HSV Dealer Team	56:27.2356
Round Results
First	(Australia) Garth Tander; HSV Dealer Team	318 pts
Second	(Australia) Jason Bright; Ford Performance Racing	294 pts
Third	(Australia) Craig Lowndes; Triple Eight Race Engineering	288 pts

The 2006 Ipswich 400 (commercially titled the 2006 BigPond 400) was a motor race for V8 Supercars held on the weekend of 21–23 July 2006. The event was held at the Queensland Raceway in Willowbank, Queensland, Australia, and consisted of three races culminating in 381 kilometres. It was the sixth round of thirteen in the 2006 V8 Supercar Championship Series.

== Background ==
There was one driver change prior to the event, José Fernández replacing Tony Ricciardello at Britek Motorsport.

== Results ==
=== Qualifying ===
Pos.	No.	Driver	Team	Car	Time
1	2	(Australia) Mark Skaife	Holden Racing Team	Holden Commodore VZ	1:10.2545
2	16	(Australia) Garth Tander	HSV Dealer Team	Holden Commodore VZ	+0.3945
3	88	(Australia) Jamie Whincup	Triple Eight Race Engineering	Ford Falcon BA	+0.4435
4	1	(Australia) Russell Ingall	Stone Brothers Racing	Ford Falcon BA	+0.4700
5	4	(Australia) James Courtney	Stone Brothers Racing	Ford Falcon BA	+0.4851
6	5	(Australia) Mark Winterbottom	Ford Performance Racing	Ford Falcon BA	+0.4926
7	6	(Australia) Jason Bright	Ford Performance Racing	Ford Falcon BA	+0.5041
8	15	(Australia) Rick Kelly	HSV Dealer Team	Holden Commodore VZ	+0.5185
9	7	(New Zealand) Steven Richards	Perkins Engineering	Holden Commodore VZ	+0.7006
10	8	(Brazil) Max Wilson	WPS Racing	Ford Falcon BA	+0.7214
11	34	(Australia) Dean Canto	Garry Rogers Motorsport	Holden Commodore VZ	+0.7866
12	888	(Australia) Craig Lowndes	Triple Eight Race Engineering	Ford Falcon BA	+0.8042
13	22	(Australia) Todd Kelly	Holden Racing Team	Holden Commodore VZ	+0.8129
14	50	(Australia) Cameron McConville	Paul Weel Racing	Holden Commodore VZ	+0.8439
15	11	(Australia) Paul Dumbrell	Perkins Engineering	Holden Commodore VZ	+0.9230
16	51	(New Zealand) Greg Murphy	Paul Weel Racing	Holden Commodore VZ	+0.9742
17	021	(New Zealand) Paul Radisich	Team Kiwi Racing	Holden Commodore VZ	+0.9887
18	33	(Australia) Lee Holdsworth	Garry Rogers Motorsport	Holden Commodore VZ	+1.0229
19	10	(Australia) Jason Bargwanna	WPS Racing	Ford Falcon BA	+1.0531
20	17	(Australia) Steven Johnson	Dick Johnson Racing	Ford Falcon BA	+1.1551
21	12	(Australia) John Bowe	Brad Jones Racing	Ford Falcon BA	+1.2234
22	25	(Australia) Warren Luff	Britek Motorsport	Ford Falcon BA	+1.2740
23	3	(New Zealand) Jason Richards	Tasman Motorsport	Holden Commodore VZ	+1.2768
24	14	(Australia) Brad Jones	Brad Jones Racing	Ford Falcon BA	+1.3104
25	67	(Australia) Paul Morris	Paul Morris Motorsport	Holden Commodore VZ	+1.3397
26	23	(Australia) Andrew Jones	Tasman Motorsport	Holden Commodore VZ	+1.4477
27	18	(Australia) Will Davison	Dick Johnson Racing	Ford Falcon BA	+1.4821
28	55	(Australia) Steve Owen	Rod Nash Racing	Holden Commodore VZ	+1.5964
29	20	(Australia) Marcus Marshall	Paul Cruickshank Racing	Ford Falcon BA	+1.7362
30	39	(Australia) Steven Ellery	Paul Morris Motorsport	Holden Commodore VZ	+1.8150
31	26	(Australia) José Fernández	Britek Motorsport	Ford Falcon BA	+2.3359

=== Top Ten Shootout ===
Pos.	No.	Driver	Team	Car	Time
1	16	(Australia) Garth Tander	HSV Dealer Team	Holden Commodore VZ	1:10.3713
2	6	(Australia) Jason Bright	Ford Performance Racing	Ford Falcon BA	+0.1079
3	4	(Australia) James Courtney	Stone Brothers Racing	Ford Falcon BA	+0.2387
4	15	(Australia) Rick Kelly	HSV Dealer Team	Holden Commodore VZ	+0.2802
5	88	(Australia) Jamie Whincup	Triple Eight Race Engineering	Ford Falcon BA	+0.3889
6	5	(Australia) Mark Winterbottom	Ford Performance Racing	Ford Falcon BA	+0.4250
7	1	(Australia) Russell Ingall	Stone Brothers Racing	Ford Falcon BA	+0.5859
8	2	(Australia) Mark Skaife	Holden Racing Team	Holden Commodore VZ	+0.7039
9	7	(New Zealand) Steven Richards	Perkins Engineering	Holden Commodore VZ	+0.8948
EXC	8	(Brazil) Max Wilson	WPS Racing	Ford Falcon BA	

=== Race 1 ===
Pos.	No.	Driver	Team	Car	Laps	Time/Retired	Grid	Pts.
1	16	(Australia) Garth Tander	HSV Dealer Team	Holden Commodore VZ	32	39:57.9354	1	128
2	6	(Australia) Jason Bright	Ford Performance Racing	Ford Falcon BA	32	+1.6411	2	124
3	4	(Australia) James Courtney	Stone Brothers Racing	Ford Falcon BA	32	+2.5121	3	120
4	888	(Australia) Craig Lowndes	Triple Eight Race Engineering	Ford Falcon BA	32	+3.0171	12	116
5	1	(Australia) Russell Ingall	Stone Brothers Racing	Ford Falcon BA	32	+3.5081	7	112
6	7	(New Zealand) Steven Richards	Perkins Engineering	Holden Commodore VZ	32	+5.9840	9	108
7	15	(Australia) Rick Kelly	HSV Dealer Team	Holden Commodore VZ	32	+7.2932	4	104
8	88	(Australia) Jamie Whincup	Triple Eight Race Engineering	Ford Falcon BA	32	+7.6697	5	100
9	5	(Australia) Mark Winterbottom	Ford Performance Racing	Ford Falcon BA	32	+7.9092	6	96
10	8	(Brazil) Max Wilson	WPS Racing	Ford Falcon BA	32	+9.7690	10	92
11	51	(New Zealand) Greg Murphy	Paul Weel Racing	Holden Commodore VZ	32	+10.1439	16	88
12	50	(Australia) Cameron McConville	Paul Weel Racing	Holden Commodore VZ	32	+10.8240	14	84
13	021	(New Zealand) Paul Radisich	Team Kiwi Racing	Holden Commodore VZ	32	+11.5178	17	80
14	17	(Australia) Steven Johnson	Dick Johnson Racing	Ford Falcon BA	32	+12.0667	20	76
15	11	(Australia) Paul Dumbrell	Perkins Engineering	Holden Commodore VZ	32	+12.8356	15	72
16	34	(Australia) Dean Canto	Garry Rogers Motorsport	Holden Commodore VZ	32	+13.4372	11	68
17	3	(New Zealand) Jason Richards	Tasman Motorsport	Holden Commodore VZ	32	+14.7220	23	64
18	33	(Australia) Lee Holdsworth	Garry Rogers Motorsport	Holden Commodore VZ	32	+16.0789	18	60
19	18	(Australia) Will Davison	Dick Johnson Racing	Ford Falcon BA	32	+16.2793	27	56
20	14	(Australia) Brad Jones	Brad Jones Racing	Ford Falcon BA	32	+17.2288	24	52
21	2	(Australia) Mark Skaife	Holden Racing Team	Holden Commodore VZ	32	+17.6541	8	48
22	23	(Australia) Andrew Jones	Tasman Motorsport	Holden Commodore VZ	32	+18.6871	26	44
23	25	(Australia) Warren Luff	Britek Motorsport	Ford Falcon BA	32	+19.3125	22	40
24	55	(Australia) Steve Owen	Rod Nash Racing	Holden Commodore VZ	32	+20.0305	28	36
25	67	(Australia) Paul Morris	Paul Morris Motorsport	Holden Commodore VZ	32	+21.2445	25	32
26	26	(Australia) José Fernández	Britek Motorsport	Ford Falcon BA	32	+22.6555	31	28
27	12	(Australia) John Bowe	Brad Jones Racing	Ford Falcon BA	32	+23.4826	21	24
28	20	(Australia) Marcus Marshall	Paul Cruickshank Racing	Ford Falcon BA	32	+25.2901	29	20
29	39	(Australia) Steven Ellery	Paul Morris Motorsport	Holden Commodore VZ	25	+7 laps	30	16
DNF	10	(Australia) Jason Bargwanna	WPS Racing	Ford Falcon BA	24	Electrical	19	
DNF	22	(Australia) Todd Kelly	Holden Racing Team	Holden Commodore VZ	3	Gearbox	13	
Fastest Lap: Garth Tander (HSV Dealer Team), 1:11.4130

=== Race 2 ===
Pos.	No.	Driver	Team	Car	Laps	Time/Retired	Grid	Pts.
1	2	(Australia) Mark Skaife	Holden Racing Team	Holden Commodore VZ	45	57:49.9456	9	64
2	16	(Australia) Garth Tander	HSV Dealer Team	Holden Commodore VZ	45	+2.6624	29	62
3	4	(Australia) James Courtney	Stone Brothers Racing	Ford Falcon BA	45	+3.9801	27	60
4	15	(Australia) Rick Kelly	HSV Dealer Team	Holden Commodore VZ	45	+4.9541	23	58
5	888	(Australia) Craig Lowndes	Triple Eight Race Engineering	Ford Falcon BA	45	+6.6133	26	56
6	67	(Australia) Paul Morris	Paul Morris Motorsport	Holden Commodore VZ	45	+8.4535	5	54
7	5	(Australia) Mark Winterbottom	Ford Performance Racing	Ford Falcon BA	45	+9.4057	21	52
8	6	(Australia) Jason Bright	Ford Performance Racing	Ford Falcon BA	45	+9.8699	28	50
9	1	(Australia) Russell Ingall	Stone Brothers Racing	Ford Falcon BA	45	+10.3546	25	48
10	50	(Australia) Cameron McConville	Paul Weel Racing	Holden Commodore VZ	45	+10.7686	18	46
11	12	(Australia) John Bowe	Brad Jones Racing	Ford Falcon BA	45	+13.5650	3	44
12	10	(Australia) Jason Bargwanna	WPS Racing	Ford Falcon BA	45	+14.2457	30	42
13	021	(New Zealand) Paul Radisich	Team Kiwi Racing	Holden Commodore VZ	45	+14.3393	17	40
14	7	(New Zealand) Steven Richards	Perkins Engineering	Holden Commodore VZ	45	+14.5707	24	38
15	34	(Australia) Dean Canto	Garry Rogers Motorsport	Holden Commodore VZ	45	+14.8288	14	36
16	25	(Australia) Warren Luff	Britek Motorsport	Ford Falcon BA	45	+15.3945	7	34
17	51	(New Zealand) Greg Murphy	Paul Weel Racing	Holden Commodore VZ	45	+16.1254	19	32
18	23	(Australia) Andrew Jones	Tasman Motorsport	Holden Commodore VZ	45	+17.2277	8	30
19	18	(Australia) Will Davison	Dick Johnson Racing	Ford Falcon BA	45	+18.7826	11	28
20	14	(Australia) Brad Jones	Brad Jones Racing	Ford Falcon BA	45	+20.9190	10	26
21	22	(Australia) Todd Kelly	Holden Racing Team	Holden Commodore VZ	45	+32.1500^{1}	31	24
22	26	(Australia) José Fernández	Britek Motorsport	Ford Falcon BA	45	+35.4088	4	22
23	17	(Australia) Steven Johnson	Dick Johnson Racing	Ford Falcon BA	45	+41.9848^{1}	16	20
24	3	(New Zealand) Jason Richards	Tasman Motorsport	Holden Commodore VZ	45	+45.0337^{1}	13	18
25	55	(Australia) Steve Owen	Rod Nash Racing	Holden Commodore VZ	44	+1 lap	6	16
26	39	(Australia) Steven Ellery	Paul Morris Motorsport	Holden Commodore VZ	41	+4 laps	1	14
27	88	(Australia) Jamie Whincup	Triple Eight Race Engineering	Ford Falcon BA	38	+7 laps^{1}	22	12
DNF	20	(Australia) Marcus Marshall	Paul Cruickshank Racing	Ford Falcon BA	18	Gearbox	2	
DNF	33	(Australia) Lee Holdsworth	Garry Rogers Motorsport	Holden Commodore VZ	11	Crash	12	
DNF	11	(Australia) Paul Dumbrell	Perkins Engineering	Holden Commodore VZ	0	Crash	15	
DNF	8	(Brazil) Max Wilson	WPS Racing	Ford Falcon BA	0	Crash	20	
Fastest Lap: Garth Tander (HSV Dealer Team), 1:11.9607

- ^1 – Todd Kelly, Steven Johnson, Jason Richards and Jamie Whincup all received 27-second post-race penalties.

=== Race 3 ===
Pos.	No.	Driver	Team	Car	Laps	Time/Retired	Grid	Pts.
1	16	(Australia) Garth Tander	HSV Dealer Team	Holden Commodore VZ	45	56:27.2356	1	128
2	15	(Australia) Rick Kelly	HSV Dealer Team	Holden Commodore VZ	45	+4.7130	5	124
3	6	(Australia) Jason Bright	Ford Performance Racing	Ford Falcon BA	45	+5.1492	3	120
4	888	(Australia) Craig Lowndes	Triple Eight Race Engineering	Ford Falcon BA	45	+5.4924	4	116
5	1	(Australia) Russell Ingall	Stone Brothers Racing	Ford Falcon BA	45	+5.9753	6	112
6	7	(New Zealand) Steven Richards	Perkins Engineering	Holden Commodore VZ	45	+11.8451	8	108
7	021	(New Zealand) Paul Radisich	Team Kiwi Racing	Holden Commodore VZ	45	+16.6510	10	104
8	88	(Australia) Jamie Whincup	Triple Eight Race Engineering	Ford Falcon BA	45	+16.9044	13	100
9	5	(Australia) Mark Winterbottom	Ford Performance Racing	Ford Falcon BA	45	+17.3450	7	96
10	51	(New Zealand) Greg Murphy	Paul Weel Racing	Holden Commodore VZ	45	+18.4089	11	92
11	8	(Brazil) Max Wilson	WPS Racing	Ford Falcon BA	45	+24.9786	16	88
12	18	(Australia) Will Davison	Dick Johnson Racing	Ford Falcon BA	45	+26.3034	18	84
13	34	(Australia) Dean Canto	Garry Rogers Motorsport	Holden Commodore VZ	45	+26.7297	14	80
14	67	(Australia) Paul Morris	Paul Morris Motorsport	Holden Commodore VZ	45	+28.2574	17	76
15	11	(Australia) Paul Dumbrell	Perkins Engineering	Holden Commodore VZ	45	+28.9427	23	72
16	3	(New Zealand) Jason Richards	Tasman Motorsport	Holden Commodore VZ	45	+29.5273	19	68
17	23	(Australia) Andrew Jones	Tasman Motorsport	Holden Commodore VZ	45	+30.7848	22	64
18	22	(Australia) Todd Kelly	Holden Racing Team	Holden Commodore VZ	45	+32.7585	30	60
19	14	(Australia) Brad Jones	Brad Jones Racing	Ford Falcon BA	45	+34.6653	20	56
20	33	(Australia) Lee Holdsworth	Garry Rogers Motorsport	Holden Commodore VZ	45	+35.8107	25	52
21	10	(Australia) Jason Bargwanna	WPS Racing	Ford Falcon BA	45	+37.8432	28	48
22	39	(Australia) Steven Ellery	Paul Morris Motorsport	Holden Commodore VZ	45	+41.1502	29	44
23	12	(Australia) John Bowe	Brad Jones Racing	Ford Falcon BA	45	+41.3125	24	40
24	20	(Australia) Marcus Marshall	Paul Cruickshank Racing	Ford Falcon BA	45	+44.4682	31	36
25	17	(Australia) Steven Johnson	Dick Johnson Racing	Ford Falcon BA	44	+1 lap	15	32
26	55	(Australia) Steve Owen	Rod Nash Racing	Holden Commodore VZ	44	+1 lap	26	28
27	2	(Australia) Mark Skaife	Holden Racing Team	Holden Commodore VZ	39	+6 laps	12	24
28	25	(Australia) Warren Luff	Britek Motorsport	Ford Falcon BA	38	+7 laps	21	20
DNF	50	(Australia) Cameron McConville	Paul Weel Racing	Holden Commodore VZ	39	Misfire	9	
DNF	4	(Australia) James Courtney	Stone Brothers Racing	Ford Falcon BA	22	Engine	2	
DNF	26	(Australia) José Fernández	Britek Motorsport	Ford Falcon BA	13		27	
Fastest Lap: James Courtney (Stone Brothers Racing), 1:11.7040

== Round standings ==
Pos.	Driver	R1	R2	R3	Total
1	(Australia) Garth Tander	1	2	1	318
2	(Australia) Jason Bright	2	8	3	294
3	(Australia) Craig Lowndes	4	5	4	288
4	(Australia) Rick Kelly	7	4	2	286
5	(Australia) Russell Ingall	5	9	5	272
6	(New Zealand) Steven Richards	6	14	6	254
7	(Australia) Mark Winterbottom	9	7	9	244
8	(New Zealand) Paul Radisich	13	13	7	224
9	(Australia) Jamie Whincup	8	27	8	212
9	(New Zealand) Greg Murphy	11	17	10	212
11	(Australia) Dean Canto	16	15	13	184
12	(Brazil) Max Wilson	10	DNF	11	180
12	(Australia) James Courtney	3	3	DNF	180
14	(Australia) Will Davison	19	19	12	168
15	(Australia) Paul Morris	25	6	14	162
16	(New Zealand) Jason Richards	17	24	16	150
17	(Australia) Paul Dumbrell	15	DNF	15	144
18	(Australia) Andrew Jones	22	18	17	138
19	(Australia) Mark Skaife	21	1	27	136
20	(Australia) Brad Jones	20	20	19	150
21	(Australia) Cameron McConville	12	10	DNF	130
22	(Australia) Steven Johnson	14	23	25	128
23	(Australia) Lee Holdsworth	18	DNF	20	112
24	(Australia) John Bowe	27	11	23	108
25	(Australia) Warren Luff	23	16	28	94
26	(Australia) Jason Bargwanna	DNF	12	21	90
27	(Australia) Todd Kelly	DNF	21	18	84
28	(Australia) Steve Owen	24	25	26	80
29	(Australia) Steven Ellery	29	26	22	74
30	(Australia) Marcus Marshall	28	DNF	24	56
31	(Australia) José Fernández	26	22	DNF	50

== Championship standings ==
Pos.	Driver	Pts	Gap
1	(Australia) Garth Tander	1642	
2	(Australia) Craig Lowndes	1604	-38
3	(Australia) Rick Kelly	1597	-45
4	(Australia) Russell Ingall	1474	-168
5	(Australia) Mark Winterbottom	1435	-207
