= 2003 Main Event (V8 Supercars) =

Motor race

(New South Wales) 2003 Main Event
Event Information
- Round 13 of 13 in the 2003 V8 Supercar Championship Series
- Date: 28-30 November 2003
- Location: Eastern Creek, New South Wales
- Venue: Eastern Creek Raceway
- Weather: Saturday: Sunny; Sunday: Overcast to heavy rain

Results
Race 1
Distance	39 laps	150 km
Pole position	Mark Skaife; Holden Racing Team	1:32.4870
Winner	Marcos Ambrose; Stone Brothers Racing	01:02:46.3944
Race 2
Distance	57 laps	225 km
Winner	Marcos Ambrose; Stone Brothers Racing	01:47:59.1941
Round Results
First	Marcos Ambrose; Stone Brothers Racing	192 pts
Second	Jason Bright; Paul Weel Racing	186 pts
Third	Max Wilson; Dick Johnson Racing	174 pts

The 2003 Main Event (known for naming rights reasons as the 2003 Main Event presented by VIP Petfoods) was the thirteenth and final round of the 2003 V8 Supercar Championship Series. It was held on the weekend of 28 to 30 November at the Eastern Creek International Raceway in Sydney, New South Wales. It consisted of one 150 km race held on Saturday and a 300 km finale on Sunday.

Three drivers entered the weekend with a mathematical chance of winning the championship - Marcos Ambrose, Greg Murphy and Mark Skaife. Skaife claimed pole position for the first race but a false start gave him a penalty which sent him out of the running. Murphy, who was struggling with the balance of the car, was also penalised for spinning Glenn Seton. The Kiwi would not take part in the second race after sustaining an injury during a demonstration event proceeding the race. Ambrose romped home unopposed to victory as a result. Sunday's race was just as assertive for the Tasmanian and amidst the downpour which would end the race early, Ambrose would take his first V8 Supercar championship title.

The race was also notable for an incident between Mark Skaife and Russell Ingall. Late in race two, the two drivers exited turn nine side-by-side and the ensuing contact saw Skaife fired into the concrete wall and out of the race. Skaife remained on the circuit until Ingall cycled around and reacted angrily toward Ingall at the edge of the track. Ingall was subsequently excluded from the weekends results, issued a $15,000AUD fine, and the incident remains one of the most controversial and infamous in the series' history.

== Background ==
The event was held on the weekend of 28 to 30 November 2003. It was the 11th ATCC/V8 Supercar event to be held at Eastern Creek International Raceway, the second event at the venue in 2003, and consisted of one 150 km race followed by a 300 km final. Both races necessitated compulsory pitstops for fuel and tyres.

This round featured a unique qualifying format. Differing from the standard hour-long qualifying session and shootout formats used year-round, the Main Event would utilise the shootout format for all 33 entrants. The starting order for the shootout was determined by a barrel draw.

=== Entry list ===
There were 33 drivers entered into the event. It featured mixture of vehicle models - three AU Ford Falcon's, fourteen BA Falcon's, nine VY Commodore's, and seven VX Commodore's.

Jamie Whincup would debut a brand-new Garry Rogers Motorsport-built VY Commodore.

David Krause would make his sole appearance for 2003 driving for Lansvale Racing Team under the Romano Racing licence in a VX Commodore.

This event would be Mark Larkham's last solo appearance in the V8 Supercar series.

== Race report ==
=== Qualifying ===
Mark Skaife led a Holden Racing Team one-two to take pole position for the first race and bolstered his championship chances. Russell Ingall was excluded from the results due to a technical infringement. David Thexton missed the 105% qualifying time by less than a tenth of a second and thus failed to qualify for the race.

Pos	No	Driver	Team	Vehicle	Time
1	1	(Australia) Mark Skaife	Holden Racing Team	Holden Commodore (VY)	1:32.4870
2	2	(Australia) Todd Kelly	Holden Racing Team	Holden Commodore (VY)	1:32.9156
3	50	(Australia) Jason Bright	Paul Weel Racing	Holden Commodore (VX)	1:33.0504
4	4	(Australia) Marcos Ambrose	Stone Brothers Racing	Ford Falcon (BA)	1:33.0745
5	6	(Australia) Craig Lowndes	Ford Performance Racing	Ford Falcon (BA)	1:33.1261
6	18	(Brazil) Max Wilson	Dick Johnson Racing	Ford Falcon (BA)	1:33.2579
7	11	(New Zealand) Steven Richards	Perkins Engineering	Holden Commodore (VY)	1:33.7456
8	5	(Australia) Glenn Seton	Ford Performance Racing	Ford Falcon (BA)	1:33.7854
9	65	(New Zealand) Paul Radisich	Triple Eight Race Engineering	Ford Falcon (BA)	1:33.7924
10	7	(Australia) David Besnard	Rod Nash Racing	Ford Falcon (BA)	1:33.8328
11	10	(Australia) Mark Larkham	Larkham Motorsport	Ford Falcon (AU)	1:33.9154
12	17	(Australia) Steven Johnson	Dick Johnson Racing	Ford Falcon (BA)	1:33.9302
13	3	(Australia) Cameron McConville	Lansvale Racing Team	Holden Commodore (VX)	1:33.9327
14	51	(New Zealand) Greg Murphy	John Kelly Racing	Holden Commodore (VY)	1:33.9559
15	34	(Australia) Garth Tander	Garry Rogers Motorsport	Holden Commodore (VY)	1:33.9586
16	15	(Australia) Rick Kelly	John Kelly Racing	Holden Commodore (VX)	1:33.9787
17	31	(Australia) Steven Ellery	Steven Ellery Racing	Ford Falcon (BA)	1:34.0187
18	16	(Australia) Paul Weel	Paul Weel Racing	Holden Commodore (VX)	1:34.1635
19	44	(New Zealand) Simon Wills	Team Dynamik	Holden Commodore (VY)	1:34.2596
20	20	(Australia) Jason Bargwanna	Larkham Motorsport	Ford Falcon (BA)	1:34.2635
21	45	(New Zealand) Jason Richards	Team Dynamik	Holden Commodore (VY)	1:34.3314
22	888	(Australia) John Bowe	Brad Jones Racing	Ford Falcon (BA)	1:34.4242
23	33	(Australia) Jamie Whincup	Garry Rogers Motorsport	Holden Commodore (VY)	1:34.6032
24	8	(Australia) Paul Dumbrell	Perkins Engineering	Holden Commodore (VX)	1:34.6134
25	66	(Australia) Dean Canto	Triple Eight Race Engineering	Ford Falcon (BA)	1:34.7008
26	021	(New Zealand) Craig Baird	Team Kiwi Racing	Holden Commodore (VX)	1:34.7687
27	29	(Australia) Paul Morris	Paul Morris Motorsport	Holden Commodore (VY)	1:34.8456
28	23	(Australia) Mark Noske	Noske Motorsport	Ford Falcon (AU)	1:34.9141
29	21	(Australia) Brad Jones	Brad Jones Racing	Ford Falcon (BA)	1:35.0176
30	24	(Australia) David Krause	Lansvale Racing Team	Holden Commodore (VX)	1:35.9353
31	75	(Australia) Anthony Tratt	Paul Little Racing	Ford Falcon (BA)	1:36.1515
EXC	9	(Australia) Russell Ingall	Stone Brothers Racing	Ford Falcon (BA)	time excluded
DNQ	99	(New Zealand) David Thexton	Thexton Motor Racing	Ford Falcon (AU)	did not qualify

=== Race 1 ===
Pos	No	Driver	Team	Car	Laps	Time/Retired	Grid
1	4	(Australia) Marcos Ambrose	Stone Brothers Racing	Ford Falcon (BA)	39	01:02:46.3944	4
2	50	(Australia) Jason Bright	Paul Weel Racing	Holden Commodore (VX)	39	+ 15.839	3
3	2	(Australia) Todd Kelly	Holden Racing Team	Holden Commodore (VY)	39	+ 23.130	2
4	11	(New Zealand) Steven Richards	Perkins Engineering	Holden Commodore (VY)	39	+ 37.187	7
5	18	(Brazil) Max Wilson	Dick Johnson Racing	Ford Falcon (BA)	39	+ 41.496	6
6	6	(Australia) Craig Lowndes	Ford Performance Racing	Ford Falcon (BA)	39	+ 42.062	5
7	1	(Australia) Mark Skaife	Holden Racing Team	Holden Commodore (VY)	39	+ 42.409	1
8	29	(Australia) Paul Morris	Paul Morris Motorsport	Holden Commodore (VY)	39	+ 50.020	27
9	20	(Australia) Jason Bargwanna	Larkham Motorsport	Ford Falcon (BA)	39	+ 54.029	20
10	3	(Australia) Cameron McConville	Lansvale Racing Team	Holden Commodore (VX)	39	+ 56.800	13
11	888	(Australia) John Bowe	Brad Jones Racing	Ford Falcon (BA)	39	+ 1:03.249	22
12	65	(New Zealand) Paul Radisich	Triple Eight Race Engineering	Ford Falcon (BA)	39	+ 1:05.760	9
13	33	(Australia) Jamie Whincup	Garry Rogers Motorsport	Holden Commodore (VY)	39	+ 1:07.101	23
14	45	(New Zealand) Jason Richards	Team Dynamik	Holden Commodore (VY)	39	+ 1:08.688	21
15	66	(Australia) Dean Canto	Triple Eight Race Engineering	Ford Falcon (BA)	39	+ 1:09.109	25
16	21	(Australia) Brad Jones	Brad Jones Racing	Ford Falcon (BA)	39	+ 1:09.730	29
17	23	(Australia) Mark Noske	Noske Motorsport	Ford Falcon (AU)	39	+ 1:10.736	28
18	5	(Australia) Glenn Seton	Ford Performance Racing	Ford Falcon (BA)	39	+ 1:11.966	8
19	10	(Australia) Mark Larkham	Larkham Motorsport	Ford Falcon (AU)	39	+ 1:18.157	11
20	17	(Australia) Steven Johnson	Dick Johnson Racing	Ford Falcon (BA)	39	+ 1:23.920	12
21	8	(Australia) Paul Dumbrell	Perkins Engineering	Holden Commodore (VX)	39	+ 1:24.899	24
22	34	(Australia) Garth Tander	Garry Rogers Motorsport	Holden Commodore (VY)	39	+ 1:25.049	15
23	51	(New Zealand) Greg Murphy	John Kelly Racing	Holden Commodore (VY)	39	+ 1:28.437	14
24	31	(Australia) Steven Ellery	Steven Ellery Racing	Ford Falcon (BA)	39	+ 1:28.621	17
25	15	(Australia) Rick Kelly	John Kelly Racing	Holden Commodore (VY)	39	+ 1:33.415	16
26	021	(New Zealand) Craig Baird	Team Kiwi Racing	Holden Commodore (VX)	38	+ 1 lap	26
27	75	(Australia) Anthony Tratt	Paul Little Racing	Ford Falcon (BA)	38	+ 1 lap	31
28	7	(Australia) David Besnard	Rod Nash Racing	Ford Falcon (BA)	38	+ 1 lap	10
29	16	(Australia) Paul Weel	Paul Weel Racing	Holden Commodore (VX)	38	+ 1 lap	18
Ret	24	(Australia) David Krause	Lansvale Racing Team	Holden Commodore (VX)	8	Mechanical	30
Ret	44	(New Zealand) Simon Wills	Team Dynamik	Holden Commodore (VY)	3	Accident damage	19
DSQ	9	(Australia) Russell Ingall	Stone Brothers Racing	Ford Falcon (BA)	39	Disqualified	33
Fastest Lap: Marcos Ambrose (Stone Brothers Racing) - 1:34.1055 on lap 4

=== Race 2 ===
Pos	No	Driver	Team	Car	Laps	Time/Retired	Grid
1	4	(Australia) Marcos Ambrose	Stone Brothers Racing	Ford Falcon (BA)	57	01:47:59.1941	1
2	50	(Australia) Jason Bright	Paul Weel Racing	Holden Commodore (VX)	57	+ 0.516	2
3	18	(Brazil) Max Wilson	Dick Johnson Racing	Ford Falcon (BA)	57	+ 3.077	6
4	6	(Australia) Craig Lowndes	Ford Performance Racing	Ford Falcon (BA)	57	+ 6.354	7
5	34	(Australia) Garth Tander	Garry Rogers Motorsport	Holden Commodore (VY)	57	+ 7.186	23
6	20	(Australia) Jason Bargwanna	Larkham Motorsport	Ford Falcon (BA)	57	+ 7.670	10
7	65	(New Zealand) Paul Radisich	Triple Eight Race Engineering	Ford Falcon (BA)	57	+ 9.153	13
8	3	(Australia) Cameron McConville	Lansvale Racing Team	Holden Commodore (VX)	57	+ 9.759	11
9	66	(Australia) Dean Canto	Triple Eight Race Engineering	Ford Falcon (BA)	57	+ 10.665	16
10	15	(Australia) Rick Kelly	John Kelly Racing	Holden Commodore (VY)	57	+ 12.137	26
11	7	(Australia) David Besnard	Rod Nash Racing	Ford Falcon (BA)	57	+ 13.522	29
12	8	(Australia) Paul Dumbrell	Perkins Engineering	Holden Commodore (VX)	57	+ 17.044	22
13	23	(Australia) Mark Noske	Noske Motorsport	Ford Falcon (AU)	57	+ 18.551	18
14	888	(Australia) John Bowe	Brad Jones Racing	Ford Falcon (BA)	57	+ 19.840	12
15	33	(Australia) Jamie Whincup	Garry Rogers Motorsport	Holden Commodore (VY)	57	+ 20.544	14
16	11	(New Zealand) Steven Richards	Perkins Engineering	Holden Commodore (VY)	57	+ 21.425	5
17	75	(Australia) Anthony Tratt	Paul Little Racing	Ford Falcon (BA)	57	+ 21.967	28
18	21	(Australia) Brad Jones	Brad Jones Racing	Ford Falcon (BA)	57	+ 22.855	17
19	29	(Australia) Paul Morris	Paul Morris Motorsport	Holden Commodore (VY)	57	+ 26.445	9
20	021	(New Zealand) Craig Baird	Team Kiwi Racing	Holden Commodore (VX)	56	+ 1 lap	27
21	45	(New Zealand) Jason Richards	Team Dynamik	Holden Commodore (VY)	56	+ 1 lap	15
22	44	(New Zealand) Simon Wills	Team Dynamik	Holden Commodore (VY)	56	+ 1 lap	32
23	31	(Australia) Steven Ellery	Steven Ellery Racing	Ford Falcon (BA)	54	+ 3 laps	25
Ret	10	(Australia) Mark Larkham	Larkham Motorsport	Ford Falcon (AU)	54	Retired	20
Ret	16	(Australia) Paul Weel	Paul Weel Racing	Holden Commodore (VX)	42	Retired	30
Ret	1	(Australia) Mark Skaife	Holden Racing Team	Holden Commodore (VY)	41	Accident	8
Ret	5	(Australia) Glenn Seton	Ford Performance Racing	Ford Falcon (BA)	36	Retired	19
Ret	17	(Australia) Steven Johnson	Dick Johnson Racing	Ford Falcon (BA)	24	Engine	21
Ret	2	(Australia) Todd Kelly	Holden Racing Team	Holden Commodore (VY)	10	Power steering	3
DSQ	9	(Australia) Russell Ingall	Stone Brothers Racing	Ford Falcon (BA)	57	Disqualified	4
DNS	51	(New Zealand) Greg Murphy	John Kelly Racing	Holden Commodore (VY)		Did not start / Injury	
DNS	24	(Australia) David Krause	Lansvale Racing Team	Holden Commodore (VX)		Did not start	
Fastest Lap: Marcos Ambrose (Stone Brothers Racing) - 1:33.9705 on lap 4

== Championship standings ==
Pos.	No	Driver	Team	Pts
1	4	(Australia) Marcos Ambrose	Stone Brothers Racing	2085
2	51	(New Zealand) Greg Murphy	John Kelly Racing	1983
3	1	(Australia) Mark Skaife	Holden Racing Team	1817
4	50	(Australia) Jason Bright	Paul Weel Racing	1770
5	6	(Australia) Craig Lowndes	Ford Performance Racing	1756
