= 2006 V8 Supercars Winton round =

2006 Supercar Championship event

(Australia) 2006 V8 Supercars Winton round
Event Information
- Round 4 of 13 in the 2006 V8 Supercar Championship Series
- Date: 2–4 June 2006
- Location: Benalla, Victoria
- Venue: Winton Motor Raceway

Results
Race 1
Distance	34 laps	102.000 km
Pole position	(Australia) Jason Bright; Ford Performance Racing	1:23.6101
Winner	(Australia) Jason Bright; Ford Performance Racing	48:58.1947
Race 2
Distance	46 laps	138.000 km
Winner	(New Zealand) Jason Richards; Tasman Motorsport	1:06:28.8562
Race 3
Distance	46 laps	138.000 km
Winner	(Australia) Craig Lowndes; Triple Eight Race Engineering	1:07:17.6312
Round Results
First	(Australia) Craig Lowndes; Triple Eight Race Engineering	302 pts
Second	(Australia) Jason Bright; Ford Performance Racing	278 pts
Third	(Australia) Rick Kelly; HSV Dealer Team	266 pts

The 2006 V8 Supercars Winton round was a motor race for V8 Supercars held on the weekend of 2–4 June 2006. The event was held at the Winton Motor Raceway in Benalla, Victoria, and consisted of three races culminating in 378 kilometres. It was the fourth round of thirteen in the 2006 V8 Supercar Championship Series.

The event was notable for Jason Richards' only race win, coming in the reverse-grid heat.

== Background ==
José Fernández and Fabian Coulthard replaced Tony Ricciardello and Alan Gurr at Britek Motorsport and Paul Morris Motorsport respectively.

== Results ==
=== Qualifying ===
Pos.	No.	Driver	Team	Car	Time
1	6	(Australia) Jason Bright	Ford Performance Racing	Ford Falcon BA	1:23.3089
2	22	(Australia) Todd Kelly	Holden Racing Team	Holden Commodore VZ	+0.0617
3	3	(New Zealand) Jason Richards	Tasman Motorsport	Holden Commodore VZ	+0.1806
4	16	(Australia) Garth Tander	HSV Dealer Team	Holden Commodore VZ	+0.2434
5	15	(Australia) Rick Kelly	HSV Dealer Team	Holden Commodore VZ	+0.2800
6	88	(Australia) Jamie Whincup	Triple Eight Race Engineering	Ford Falcon BA	+0.3290
7	11	(Australia) Paul Dumbrell	Perkins Engineering	Holden Commodore VZ	+0.3387
8	7	(New Zealand) Steven Richards	Perkins Engineering	Holden Commodore VZ	+0.3472
9	888	(Australia) Craig Lowndes	Triple Eight Race Engineering	Ford Falcon BA	+0.4301
10	5	(Australia) Mark Winterbottom	Ford Performance Racing	Ford Falcon BA	+0.5206
11	2	(Australia) Mark Skaife	Holden Racing Team	Holden Commodore VZ	+0.5535
12	34	(Australia) Dean Canto	Garry Rogers Motorsport	Holden Commodore VZ	+0.6446
13	51	(New Zealand) Greg Murphy	Paul Weel Racing	Holden Commodore VZ	+0.6847
14	17	(Australia) Steven Johnson	Dick Johnson Racing	Ford Falcon BA	+0.7948
15	1	(Australia) Russell Ingall	Stone Brothers Racing	Ford Falcon BA	+0.7978
16	55	(Australia) Steve Owen	Rod Nash Racing	Holden Commodore VZ	+0.8373
17	23	(Australia) Andrew Jones	Tasman Motorsport	Holden Commodore VZ	+0.9033
18	8	(Brazil) Max Wilson	WPS Racing	Ford Falcon BA	+0.9524
19	4	(Australia) James Courtney	Stone Brothers Racing	Ford Falcon BA	+0.9686
20	18	(Australia) Will Davison	Dick Johnson Racing	Ford Falcon BA	+1.0078
21	021	(New Zealand) Paul Radisich	Team Kiwi Racing	Holden Commodore VZ	+1.0187
22	39	(New Zealand) Fabian Coulthard	Paul Morris Motorsport	Holden Commodore VZ	+1.0309
23	33	(Australia) Lee Holdsworth	Garry Rogers Motorsport	Holden Commodore VZ	+1.0541
24	10	(Australia) Jason Bargwanna	WPS Racing	Ford Falcon BA	+1.1892
25	67	(Australia) Paul Morris	Paul Morris Motorsport	Holden Commodore VZ	+1.2521
26	14	(Australia) Brad Jones	Brad Jones Racing	Ford Falcon BA	+1.3031
27	12	(Australia) John Bowe	Brad Jones Racing	Ford Falcon BA	+1.6138
28	25	(Australia) Warren Luff	Britek Motorsport	Ford Falcon BA	+1.7997
29	20	(Australia) Marcus Marshall	Paul Cruickshank Racing	Ford Falcon BA	+1.9249
30	26	(Australia) José Fernández	Britek Motorsport	Ford Falcon BA	+2.4750
NC	50	(Australia) Cameron McConville	Paul Weel Racing	Holden Commodore VZ	No time

=== Top Ten Shootout ===
Pos.	No.	Driver	Team	Car	Time
1	6	(Australia) Jason Bright	Ford Performance Racing	Ford Falcon BA	1:23.6101
2	11	(Australia) Paul Dumbrell	Perkins Engineering	Holden Commodore VZ	+0.0114
3	3	(New Zealand) Jason Richards	Tasman Motorsport	Holden Commodore VZ	+0.0186
4	888	(Australia) Craig Lowndes	Triple Eight Race Engineering	Ford Falcon BA	+0.0530
5	7	(New Zealand) Steven Richards	Perkins Engineering	Holden Commodore VZ	+0.3965
6	22	(Australia) Todd Kelly	Holden Racing Team	Holden Commodore VZ	+0.5246
7	2	(Australia) Mark Skaife	Holden Racing Team	Holden Commodore VZ	+0.7626
8	88	(Australia) Jamie Whincup	Triple Eight Race Engineering	Ford Falcon BA	+1.1552
9	15	(Australia) Rick Kelly	HSV Dealer Team	Holden Commodore VZ	+3.6123
10	5	(Australia) Mark Winterbottom	Ford Performance Racing	Ford Falcon BA	+3.6580

=== Race 1 ===
Pos.	No.	Driver	Team	Car	Laps	Time/Retired	Grid	Pts.
1	6	(Australia) Jason Bright	Ford Performance Racing	Ford Falcon BA	34	48:58.1947	1	128
2	888	(Australia) Craig Lowndes	Triple Eight Race Engineering	Ford Falcon BA	34	+6.1742	4	124
3	11	(Australia) Paul Dumbrell	Perkins Engineering	Holden Commodore VZ	34	+9.2899	2	120
4	22	(Australia) Todd Kelly	Holden Racing Team	Holden Commodore VZ	34	+14.9440	6	116
5	2	(Australia) Mark Skaife	Holden Racing Team	Holden Commodore VZ	34	+18.0254	7	112
6	16	(Australia) Garth Tander	HSV Dealer Team	Holden Commodore VZ	34	+18.7003	11	108
7	7	(New Zealand) Steven Richards	Perkins Engineering	Holden Commodore VZ	34	+19.1730	5	104
8	5	(Australia) Mark Winterbottom	Ford Performance Racing	Ford Falcon BA	34	+23.2212	10	100
9	51	(New Zealand) Greg Murphy	Paul Weel Racing	Holden Commodore VZ	34	+31.0718	13	96
10	15	(Australia) Rick Kelly	HSV Dealer Team	Holden Commodore VZ	34	+33.1443	9	92
11	17	(Australia) Steven Johnson	Dick Johnson Racing	Ford Falcon BA	34	+33.4830	14	88
12	1	(Australia) Russell Ingall	Stone Brothers Racing	Ford Falcon BA	34	+34.5983	15	84
13	55	(Australia) Steve Owen	Rod Nash Racing	Holden Commodore VZ	34	+35.2275	16	80
14	18	(Australia) Will Davison	Dick Johnson Racing	Ford Falcon BA	34	+45.7289	20	76
15	4	(Australia) James Courtney	Stone Brothers Racing	Ford Falcon BA	34	+47.8174	19	72
16	33	(Australia) Lee Holdsworth	Garry Rogers Motorsport	Holden Commodore VZ	34	+51.7587	23	68
17	8	(Brazil) Max Wilson	WPS Racing	Ford Falcon BA	34	+1:01.6038	18	64
18	14	(Australia) Brad Jones	Brad Jones Racing	Ford Falcon BA	34	+1:03.3742	26	60
19	50	(Australia) Cameron McConville	Paul Weel Racing	Holden Commodore VZ	34	+1:09.6762	31	56
20	021	(New Zealand) Paul Radisich	Team Kiwi Racing	Holden Commodore VZ	34	+1:10.8411	21	52
21	25	(Australia) Warren Luff	Britek Motorsport	Ford Falcon BA	34	+1:18.2272	28	48
22	34	(Australia) Dean Canto	Garry Rogers Motorsport	Holden Commodore VZ	34	+1:24.1396	12	44
23	12	(Australia) John Bowe	Brad Jones Racing	Ford Falcon BA	34	+1:24.5376	27	40
24	10	(Australia) Jason Bargwanna	WPS Racing	Ford Falcon BA	33	+1 Lap	24	36
25	88	(Australia) Jamie Whincup	Triple Eight Race Engineering	Ford Falcon BA	33	+1 Lap	8	32
26	26	(Australia) José Fernández	Britek Motorsport	Ford Falcon BA	33	+1 Lap	30	28
27	3	(New Zealand) Jason Richards	Tasman Motorsport	Holden Commodore VZ	31	+3 Laps	3	24
28	20	(Australia) Marcus Marshall	Paul Cruickshank Racing	Ford Falcon BA	30	+4 Laps	29	20
Ret	67	(Australia) Paul Morris	Paul Morris Motorsport	Holden Commodore VZ	33		25	
Ret	23	(Australia) Andrew Jones	Tasman Motorsport	Holden Commodore VZ	24	Misfire	17	
Ret	39	(New Zealand) Fabian Coulthard	Paul Morris Motorsport	Holden Commodore VZ	13		22	
Fastest lap: Jason Bright (Ford Performance Racing), 1:24.2992

=== Race 2 ===
Pos.	No.	Driver	Team	Car	Laps	Time/Retired	Grid	Pts.
1	3	(New Zealand) Jason Richards	Tasman Motorsport	Holden Commodore VZ	46	1:06:28.8562	2	64
2	88	(Australia) Jamie Whincup	Triple Eight Race Engineering	Ford Falcon BA	46	+14.2033	4	62
3	34	(Australia) Dean Canto	Garry Rogers Motorsport	Holden Commodore VZ	46	+28.2814	7	60
4	15	(Australia) Rick Kelly	HSV Dealer Team	Holden Commodore VZ	46	+32.4549	19	58
5	1	(Australia) Russell Ingall	Stone Brothers Racing	Ford Falcon BA	46	+32.8048	17	56
6	8	(Brazil) Max Wilson	WPS Racing	Ford Falcon BA	46	+37.4811	12	54
7	55	(Australia) Steve Owen	Rod Nash Racing	Holden Commodore VZ	46	+37.8314	16	52
8	888	(Australia) Craig Lowndes	Triple Eight Race Engineering	Ford Falcon BA	46	+38.7273	27	50
9	20	(Australia) Marcus Marshall	Paul Cruickshank Racing	Ford Falcon BA	46	+43.2634	1	48
10	16	(Australia) Garth Tander	HSV Dealer Team	Holden Commodore VZ	46	+46.3694	23	46
11	23	(Australia) Andrew Jones	Tasman Motorsport	Holden Commodore VZ	46	+46.7058	30	44
12	5	(Australia) Mark Winterbottom	Ford Performance Racing	Ford Falcon BA	46	+47.3484	21	42
13	12	(Australia) John Bowe	Brad Jones Racing	Ford Falcon BA	46	+48.5654	6	40
14	11	(Australia) Paul Dumbrell	Perkins Engineering	Holden Commodore VZ	46	+49.0918	26	38
15	39	(New Zealand) Fabian Coulthard	Paul Morris Motorsport	Holden Commodore VZ	46	+49.6743	31	36
16	33	(Australia) Lee Holdsworth	Garry Rogers Motorsport	Holden Commodore VZ	46	+50.9731	13	34
17	2	(Australia) Mark Skaife	Holden Racing Team	Holden Commodore VZ	46	+59.3369	24	32
18	25	(Australia) Warren Luff	Britek Motorsport	Ford Falcon BA	46	+1:00.9050	8	30
19	14	(Australia) Brad Jones	Brad Jones Racing	Ford Falcon BA	46	+1:06.4605	11	28
20	6	(Australia) Jason Bright	Ford Performance Racing	Ford Falcon BA	46	+1:12.6481	28	26
21	67	(Australia) Paul Morris	Paul Morris Motorsport	Holden Commodore VZ	46	+1:33.9342	29	24
22	50	(Australia) Cameron McConville	Paul Weel Racing	Holden Commodore VZ	45	+1 Lap	10	22
23	7	(New Zealand) Steven Richards	Perkins Engineering	Holden Commodore VZ	45	+1 Lap	22	20
24	26	(Australia) José Fernández	Britek Motorsport	Ford Falcon BA	45	+1 Lap	3	18
25	22	(Australia) Todd Kelly	Holden Racing Team	Holden Commodore VZ	40	+5 Laps	25	16
Ret	10	(Australia) Jason Bargwanna	WPS Racing	Ford Falcon BA	41	Crash	5	
Ret	51	(New Zealand) Greg Murphy	Paul Weel Racing	Holden Commodore VZ	26	Engine	20	
Ret	4	(Australia) James Courtney	Stone Brothers Racing	Ford Falcon BA	2	Crash	14	
Ret	17	(Australia) Steven Johnson	Dick Johnson Racing	Ford Falcon BA	2	Crash	18	
Ret	021	(New Zealand) Paul Radisich	Team Kiwi Racing	Holden Commodore VZ	2	Crash	9	
DSQ	18	(Australia) Will Davison	Dick Johnson Racing	Ford Falcon BA	46	Excluded	15	
Fastest lap: Jason Bright (Ford Performance Racing), 1:24.8965

=== Race 3 ===
Pos.	No.	Driver	Team	Car	Laps	Time/Retired	Grid	Pts.
1	888	(Australia) Craig Lowndes	Triple Eight Race Engineering	Ford Falcon BA	46	1:07:17.6312	1	128
2	6	(Australia) Jason Bright	Ford Performance Racing	Ford Falcon BA	46	+0.3913	4	124
3	2	(Australia) Mark Skaife	Holden Racing Team	Holden Commodore VZ	46	+19.5767	6	120
4	15	(Australia) Rick Kelly	HSV Dealer Team	Holden Commodore VZ	46	+20.1948	5	116
5	16	(Australia) Garth Tander	HSV Dealer Team	Holden Commodore VZ	46	+20.5943	3	112
6	5	(Australia) Mark Winterbottom	Ford Performance Racing	Ford Falcon BA	46	+24.6421	7	108
7	11	(Australia) Paul Dumbrell	Perkins Engineering	Holden Commodore VZ	46	+28.0733	2	104
8	3	(New Zealand) Jason Richards	Tasman Motorsport	Holden Commodore VZ	46	+29.0938	17	100
9	88	(Australia) Jamie Whincup	Triple Eight Race Engineering	Ford Falcon BA	46	+30.1590	16	96
10	7	(New Zealand) Steven Richards	Perkins Engineering	Holden Commodore VZ	46	+32.3637	11	92
11	55	(Australia) Steve Owen	Rod Nash Racing	Holden Commodore VZ	46	+32.9440	9	88
12	33	(Australia) Lee Holdsworth	Garry Rogers Motorsport	Holden Commodore VZ	46	+37.0901	14	84
13	8	(Brazil) Max Wilson	WPS Racing	Ford Falcon BA	46	+43.5006	12	80
14	17	(Australia) Steven Johnson	Dick Johnson Racing	Ford Falcon BA	46	+44.5392	19	76
15	50	(Australia) Cameron McConville	Paul Weel Racing	Holden Commodore VZ	46	+49.2697	22	72
16	021	(New Zealand) Paul Radisich	Team Kiwi Racing	Holden Commodore VZ	46	+49.4568	26	68
17	10	(Australia) Jason Bargwanna	WPS Racing	Ford Falcon BA	46	+54.5633	30	64
18	23	(Australia) Andrew Jones	Tasman Motorsport	Holden Commodore VZ	46	+55.0700	28	60
19	12	(Australia) John Bowe	Brad Jones Racing	Ford Falcon BA	46	+1:10.0414	20	56
20	34	(Australia) Dean Canto	Garry Rogers Motorsport	Holden Commodore VZ	46	+1:11.1847	13	52
21	39	(New Zealand) Fabian Coulthard	Paul Morris Motorsport	Holden Commodore VZ	46	+1:12.2265	29	48
22	14	(Australia) Brad Jones	Brad Jones Racing	Ford Falcon BA	46	+1:21.6788	18	44
23	18	(Australia) Will Davison	Dick Johnson Racing	Ford Falcon BA	46	+1:42.4920	23	40
24	22	(Australia) Todd Kelly	Holden Racing Team	Holden Commodore VZ	45	+1 Lap	10	36
25	1	(Australia) Russell Ingall	Stone Brothers Racing	Ford Falcon BA	45	+1 Lap	8	32
26	26	(Australia) José Fernández	Britek Motorsport	Ford Falcon BA	45	+1 Lap	27	28
27	4	(Australia) James Courtney	Stone Brothers Racing	Ford Falcon BA	38	+7 Laps	24	24
28	25	(Australia) Warren Luff	Britek Motorsport	Ford Falcon BA	36	+9 Laps	21	20
Ret	51	(New Zealand) Greg Murphy	Paul Weel Racing	Holden Commodore VZ	9	Mechanical	15	
Ret	67	(Australia) Paul Morris	Paul Morris Motorsport	Holden Commodore VZ	7	Mechanical	31	
Ret	20	(Australia) Marcus Marshall	Paul Cruickshank Racing	Ford Falcon BA	5	Mechanical	25	
Fastest lap: Jason Bright (Ford Performance Racing), 1:24.1951

== Round standings ==
Pos.	Driver	R1	R2	R3	Total
1	(Australia) Craig Lowndes	2	8	1	302
2	(Australia) Jason Bright	1	20	2	278
3	(Australia) Rick Kelly	10	4	4	266
=	(Australia) Garth Tander	6	10	5	=
5	(Australia) Mark Skaife	5	17	3	264
6	(Australia) Paul Dumbrell	3	14	7	262
7	(Australia) Mark Winterbottom	8	12	6	250
8	(Australia) Steve Owen	13	7	11	220
9	(New Zealand) Steven Richards	7	23	10	216
10	(Brazil) Max Wilson	17	6	13	198
11	(Australia) Jamie Whincup	25	2	9	190
12	(New Zealand) Jason Richards	27	1	8	188
13	(Australia) Lee Holdsworth	16	16	12	186
14	(Australia) Russell Ingall	12	5	25	172
15	(Australia) Todd Kelly	4	25	24	168
16	(Australia) Steven Johnson	11	Ret	14	164
17	(Australia) Dean Canto	22	3	20	156
18	(Australia) Cameron McConville	19	22	15	150
19	(Australia) John Bowe	23	13	19	136
20	(Australia) Brad Jones	18	19	22	132
21	(New Zealand) Paul Radisich	20	Ret	16	120
22	(Australia) Will Davison	14	DSQ	23	116
23	(Australia) Andrew Jones	Ret	11	18	104
24	(Australia) Jason Bargwanna	24	Ret	17	100
25	(Australia) Warren Luff	21	18	28	98
26	(Australia) James Courtney	15	Ret	27	96
=	(New Zealand) Greg Murphy	9	Ret	Ret	=
28	(New Zealand) Fabian Coulthard	Ret	15	21	84
29	(Australia) José Fernández	26	24	26	74
30	(Australia) Marcus Marshall	28	9	Ret	68
31	(Australia) Paul Morris	Ret	21	Ret	24

== Championship standings ==
Pos.	Driver	Pts	Gap
1	(Australia) Garth Tander	1042	
2	(Australia) Rick Kelly	1019	-23
3	(Australia) Craig Lowndes	1012	-30
4	(New Zealand) Steven Richards	978	-64
5	(Australia) Russell Ingall	952	-90
