= Max Wilson =

Max Wilson may refer to:

- Max Wilson (baseball) (1916–1977), American baseball pitcher
- Max Wilson (footballer) (born 2007), English footballer
- Max Wilson (racing driver) (born 1972), Brazilian-German racing driver and TV analyst

== See also ==
- Mac Wilson (disambiguation)
