= 2003 V8 Supercar Challenge =

2003 Supercar Championship event

(Queensland) 2003 V8 Supercar Challenge
Event Information
- Round 11 of 13 in the 2003 V8 Supercar Championship Series
- Date: 23–26 October 2003
- Location: Surfers Paradise, Queensland
- Venue: Surfers Paradise Street Circuit
- Weather: Fine

Results
Race 1
| Distance | 22 laps | 100 km |
| Pole position | Todd Kelly; Holden Racing Team | 1:51.3994 |
| Winner | Russell Ingall; Stone Brothers Racing | 44:08.8285 |
Race 2
| Distance | 22 laps | 100 km |
| Winner | Russell Ingall; Stone Brothers Racing | 53:32.4229 |
Round Results
| First | Russell Ingall; Stone Brothers Racing | 192 pts |
| Second | Greg Murphy; John Kelly Racing | 186 pts |
| Third | Mark Skaife; Holden Racing Team | 180 pts |

The 2003 V8 Supercar Challenge (known for naming rights reasons as the 2003 Gillette V8 Supercar Challenge) was the eleventh round of the 2003 V8 Supercar Championship Series. It was held on the weekend of 23 to 26 October at the Surfers Paradise Street Circuit in Gold Coast, Queensland. The event ran as part of the support package for the 2003 Lexmark Indy 300 Champ Car World Series race.

Russell Ingall secured his second round victory of the year by winning both races of the weekend in assertive fashion. He was closely followed by Greg Murphy in both races, and a pitlane incident between the two in the first race came under scrutiny. Mark Skaife rounded out the podium in both races while championship leader Marcos Ambrose struggled to keep in touch with the Holden contingency owing to a lukewarm qualifying effort as well as engine trouble in the second race.

Despite the engine dramas, Ambrose still led the championship at the conclusion of the event by virtue of securing sixth and fourth in both respective races.

== Background ==
The event was held on the weekend of 23 to 26 October 2003. It was the second V8 Supercar championship event to be held on the streets of Surfers Paradise and consisted of two 100 km races with compulsory pitstops in both for tyres. The event ran as part of the support package for the 2003 Lexmark Indy 300 Champ Car World Series race.

=== Entry list ===
There were 33 drivers entered into the event. It featured mixture of vehicle models - four AU Ford Falcon's, thirteen BA Falcon's, six VY Commodore's, and nine VX Commodore's.

Form this round onwards, the Rod Nash Racing entry of David Besnard had switched from the number 19 to number 7 for the remainder of the championship.

== Race report ==
=== Qualifying ===
Mark Skaife secured provisional pole position while Max Wilson secured his best session result of the season thus far. As had often been the case that season, David Thexton failed to qualify for the races after missing the 105% qualifying cut-off time.

| Pos | No | Driver | Team | Vehicle | Time |
|---|---|---|---|---|---|
| 1 | 1 | (Australia) Mark Skaife | Holden Racing Team | Holden Commodore (VY) | 1:50.8954 |
| 2 | 18 | (Brazil) Max Wilson | Dick Johnson Racing | Ford Falcon (BA) | 1:51.3122 |
| 3 | 50 | (Australia) Jason Bright | Paul Weel Racing | Holden Commodore (VX) | 1:51.3916 |
| 4 | 51 | (New Zealand) Greg Murphy | John Kelly Racing | Holden Commodore (VY) | 1:51.4748 |
| 5 | 9 | (Australia) Russell Ingall | Stone Brothers Racing | Ford Falcon (BA) | 1:51.5291 |
| 6 | 45 | (New Zealand) Jason Richards | Team Dynamik | Holden Commodore (VY) | 1:51.5920 |
| 7 | 11 | (New Zealand) Steven Richards | Perkins Engineering | Holden Commodore (VY) | 1:51.6981 |
| 8 | 31 | (Australia) Steven Ellery | Steven Ellery Racing | Ford Falcon (BA) | 1:51.7113 |
| 9 | 15 | (Australia) Rick Kelly | John Kelly Racing | Holden Commodore (VY) | 1:51.7395 |
| 10 | 2 | (Australia) Todd Kelly | Holden Racing Team | Holden Commodore (VY) | 1:51.9309 |
| 11 | 66 | (Australia) Dean Canto | Triple Eight Race Engineering | Ford Falcon (BA) | 1:51.9700 |
| 12 | 17 | (Australia) Steven Johnson | Dick Johnson Racing | Ford Falcon (BA) | 1:52.0238 |
| 13 | 44 | (New Zealand) Simon Wills | Team Dynamik | Holden Commodore (VY) | 1:52.0491 |
| 14 | 5 | (Australia) Glenn Seton | Ford Performance Racing | Ford Falcon (BA) | 1:52.1323 |
| 15 | 4 | (Australia) Marcos Ambrose | Stone Brothers Racing | Ford Falcon (BA) | 1:52.1675 |
| 16 | 65 | (New Zealand) Paul Radisich | Triple Eight Race Engineering | Ford Falcon (BA) | 1:52.1985 |
| 17 | 7 | (Australia) David Besnard | Rod Nash Racing | Ford Falcon (BA) | 1:52.2376 |
| 18 | 888 | (Australia) John Bowe | Brad Jones Racing | Ford Falcon (BA) | 1:52.3537 |
| 19 | 6 | (Australia) Craig Lowndes | Ford Performance Racing | Ford Falcon (BA) | 1:52.5433 |
| 20 | 3 | (Australia) Cameron McConville | Lansvale Racing Team | Holden Commodore (VX) | 1:52.5856 |
| 21 | 021 | (New Zealand) Craig Baird | Team Kiwi Racing | Holden Commodore (VX) | 1:52.6223 |
| 22 | 10 | (Australia) Mark Larkham | Larkham Motorsport | Ford Falcon (AU) | 1:52.7010 |
| 23 | 21 | (Australia) Brad Jones | Brad Jones Racing | Ford Falcon (BA) | 1:52.7062 |
| 24 | 34 | (Australia) Garth Tander | Garry Rogers Motorsport | Holden Commodore (VY) | 1:52.7339 |
| 25 | 16 | (Australia) Paul Weel | Paul Weel Racing | Holden Commodore (VX) | 1:52.8020 |
| 26 | 8 | (Australia) Paul Dumbrell | Perkins Engineering | Holden Commodore (VX) | 1:52.9314 |
| 27 | 23 | (Australia) Mark Noske | Noske Motorsport | Ford Falcon (AU) | 1:52.9503 |
| 28 | 20 | (Australia) Jason Bargwanna | Larkham Motorsport | Ford Falcon (BA) | 1:53.3289 |
| 29 | 33 | (Australia) Jamie Whincup | Garry Rogers Motorsport | Holden Commodore (VX) | 1:53.4043 |
| 30 | 29 | (Australia) Paul Morris | Paul Morris Motorsport | Holden Commodore (VY) | 1:53.5871 |
| 31 | 75 | (Australia) Anthony Tratt | Paul Little Racing | Ford Falcon (BA) | 1:54.3125 |
| DNQ | 99 | (New Zealand) David Thexton | Thexton Motor Racing | Ford Falcon (AU) | 1:59.6894 |

=== Top ten shootout ===
| Pos | No | Driver | Team | Vehicle | Time |
|---|---|---|---|---|---|
| 1 | 2 | (Australia) Todd Kelly | Holden Racing Team | Holden Commodore (VY) | 1:51.3994 |
| 2 | 1 | (Australia) Mark Skaife | Holden Racing Team | Holden Commodore (VY) | 1:51.5471 |
| 3 | 9 | (Australia) Russell Ingall | Stone Brothers Racing | Ford Falcon (BA) | 1:51.5645 |
| 4 | 50 | (Australia) Jason Bright | Paul Weel Racing | Holden Commodore (VX) | 1:51.7739 |
| 5 | 51 | (New Zealand) Greg Murphy | John Kelly Racing | Holden Commodore (VY) | 1:52.0433 |
| 6 | 45 | (New Zealand) Jason Richards | Team Dynamik | Holden Commodore (VY) | 1:52.2852 |
| 7 | 31 | (Australia) Steven Ellery | Steven Ellery Racing | Ford Falcon (BA) | 1:52.2902 |
| 8 | 18 | (Brazil) Max Wilson | Dick Johnson Racing | Ford Falcon (BA) | 1:52.3005 |
| 9 | 11 | (New Zealand) Steven Richards | Perkins Engineering | Holden Commodore (VY) | 1:52.5153 |
| 10 | 15 | (Australia) Rick Kelly | John Kelly Racing | Holden Commodore (VY) | 1:52.7294 |

=== Race 1 ===
| Pos | No | Driver | Team | Car | Laps | Time/Retired | Grid |
|---|---|---|---|---|---|---|---|
| 1 | 9 | (Australia) Russell Ingall | Stone Brothers Racing | Ford Falcon (BA) | 22 | 44:08.8285 | 3 |
| 2 | 51 | (New Zealand) Greg Murphy | John Kelly Racing | Holden Commodore (VY) | 22 | + 2.875 | 5 |
| 3 | 1 | (Australia) Mark Skaife | Holden Racing Team | Holden Commodore (VY) | 22 | + 7.763 | 2 |
| 4 | 50 | (Australia) Jason Bright | Paul Weel Racing | Holden Commodore (VX) | 22 | + 9.326 | 4 |
| 5 | 15 | (Australia) Rick Kelly | John Kelly Racing | Holden Commodore (VY) | 22 | + 13.516 | 10 |
| 6 | 4 | (Australia) Marcos Ambrose | Stone Brothers Racing | Ford Falcon (BA) | 22 | + 16.146 | 15 |
| 7 | 7 | (Australia) David Besnard | Rod Nash Racing | Ford Falcon (BA) | 22 | + 22.841 | 17 |
| 8 | 17 | (Australia) Steven Johnson | Dick Johnson Racing | Ford Falcon (BA) | 22 | + 26.042 | 12 |
| 9 | 18 | (Brazil) Max Wilson | Dick Johnson Racing | Ford Falcon (BA) | 22 | + 27.358 | 8 |
| 10 | 2 | (Australia) Todd Kelly | Holden Racing Team | Holden Commodore (VY) | 22 | + 27.510 | 1 |
| 11 | 65 | (New Zealand) Paul Radisich | Triple Eight Race Engineering | Ford Falcon (BA) | 22 | + 31.846 | 16 |
| 12 | 5 | (Australia) Glenn Seton | Ford Performance Racing | Ford Falcon (BA) | 22 | + 32.455 | 14 |
| 13 | 16 | (Australia) Paul Weel | Paul Weel Racing | Holden Commodore (VX) | 22 | + 36.191 | 25 |
| 14 | 888 | (Australia) John Bowe | Brad Jones Racing | Ford Falcon (BA) | 22 | + 36.663 | 18 |
| 15 | 6 | (Australia) Craig Lowndes | Ford Performance Racing | Ford Falcon (BA) | 22 | + 47.909 | 19 |
| 16 | 34 | (Australia) Garth Tander | Garry Rogers Motorsport | Holden Commodore (VY) | 22 | + 49.857 | 24 |
| 17 | 20 | (Australia) Jason Bargwanna | Larkham Motorsport | Ford Falcon (BA) | 22 | + 50.207 | 28 |
| 18 | 10 | (Australia) Mark Larkham | Larkham Motorsport | Ford Falcon (AU) | 22 | + 51.203 | 22 |
| 19 | 3 | (Australia) Cameron McConville | Lansvale Racing Team | Holden Commodore (VX) | 22 | + 51.623 | 20 |
| 20 | 29 | (Australia) Paul Morris | Paul Morris Motorsport | Holden Commodore (VY) | 22 | + 54.803 | 30 |
| 21 | 021 | (New Zealand) Craig Baird | Team Kiwi Racing | Holden Commodore (VX) | 22 | + 55.433 | 21 |
| 22 | 44 | (New Zealand) Simon Wills | Team Dynamik | Holden Commodore (VY) | 22 | + 55.977 | 13 |
| 23 | 45 | (New Zealand) Jason Richards | Team Dynamik | Holden Commodore (VY) | 22 | + 1:03.684 | 6 |
| 24 | 75 | (Australia) Anthony Tratt | Paul Little Racing | Ford Falcon (BA) | 22 | + 1:11.404 | 31 |
| 25 | 33 | (Australia) Jamie Whincup | Garry Rogers Motorsport | Holden Commodore (VX) | 22 | + 1:21.078 | 29 |
| 26 | 8 | (Australia) Paul Dumbrell | Perkins Engineering | Holden Commodore (VX) | 22 | + 1:23.967 | 26 |
| Ret | 23 | (Australia) Mark Noske | Noske Motorsport | Ford Falcon (AU) | 19 | Suspension | 27 |
| Ret | 31 | (Australia) Steven Ellery | Steven Ellery Racing | Ford Falcon (BA) | 18 | Engine | 7 |
| Ret | 21 | (Australia) Brad Jones | Brad Jones Racing | Ford Falcon (BA) | 4 | Oil pressure | 23 |
| Ret | 11 | (New Zealand) Steven Richards | Perkins Engineering | Holden Commodore (VY) | 4 | Oil pressure | 9 |
| Ret | 66 | (Australia) Dean Canto | Triple Eight Race Engineering | Ford Falcon (BA) | 0 | Accident damage | 11 |
Fastest Lap: Russell Ingall (Stone Brothers Racing) - 1:52.2976 on lap 14

=== Race 2 ===
| Pos | No | Driver | Team | Car | Laps | Time/Retired | Grid |
|---|---|---|---|---|---|---|---|
| 1 | 9 | (Australia) Russell Ingall | Stone Brothers Racing | Ford Falcon (BA) | 22 | 53:32.4229 | 1 |
| 2 | 51 | (New Zealand) Greg Murphy | John Kelly Racing | Holden Commodore (VY) | 22 | + 0.700 | 2 |
| 3 | 1 | (Australia) Mark Skaife | Holden Racing Team | Holden Commodore (VY) | 22 | + 1.075 | 3 |
| 4 | 4 | (Australia) Marcos Ambrose | Stone Brothers Racing | Ford Falcon (BA) | 22 | + 3.752 | 6 |
| 5 | 5 | (Australia) Glenn Seton | Ford Performance Racing | Ford Falcon (BA) | 22 | + 6.044 | 12 |
| 6 | 65 | (New Zealand) Paul Radisich | Triple Eight Race Engineering | Ford Falcon (BA) | 22 | + 6.730 | 11 |
| 7 | 15 | (Australia) Rick Kelly | John Kelly Racing | Holden Commodore (VY) | 22 | + 7.630 | 5 |
| 8 | 17 | (Australia) Steven Johnson | Dick Johnson Racing | Ford Falcon (BA) | 22 | + 8.139 | 8 |
| 9 | 6 | (Australia) Craig Lowndes | Ford Performance Racing | Ford Falcon (BA) | 22 | + 8.593 | 15 |
| 10 | 888 | (Australia) John Bowe | Brad Jones Racing | Ford Falcon (BA) | 22 | + 9.961 | 14 |
| 11 | 44 | (New Zealand) Simon Wills | Team Dynamik | Holden Commodore (VY) | 22 | + 10.380 | 22 |
| 12 | 33 | (Australia) Jamie Whincup | Garry Rogers Motorsport | Holden Commodore (VX) | 22 | + 10.527 | 25 |
| 13 | 20 | (Australia) Jason Bargwanna | Larkham Motorsport | Ford Falcon (BA) | 22 | + 10.839 | 17 |
| 14 | 021 | (New Zealand) Craig Baird | Team Kiwi Racing | Holden Commodore (VX) | 22 | + 11.167 | 21 |
| 15 | 3 | (Australia) Cameron McConville | Lansvale Racing Team | Holden Commodore (VX) | 22 | + 11.472 | 19 |
| 16 | 16 | (Australia) Paul Weel | Paul Weel Racing | Holden Commodore (VX) | 22 | + 12.073 | 13 |
| 17 | 10 | (Australia) Mark Larkham | Larkham Motorsport | Ford Falcon (AU) | 22 | + 12.510 | 18 |
| 18 | 21 | (Australia) Brad Jones | Brad Jones Racing | Ford Falcon (BA) | 22 | + 12.606 | 29 |
| 19 | 29 | (Australia) Paul Morris | Paul Morris Motorsport | Holden Commodore (VY) | 22 | + 13.550 | 20 |
| 20 | 75 | (Australia) Anthony Tratt | Paul Little Racing | Ford Falcon (BA) | 22 | + 13.947 | 24 |
| 21 | 8 | (Australia) Paul Dumbrell | Perkins Engineering | Holden Commodore (VX) | 22 | + 14.231 | 26 |
| 22 | 11 | (New Zealand) Steven Richards | Perkins Engineering | Holden Commodore (VY) | 22 | + 14.724 | 30 |
| 23 | 18 | (Brazil) Max Wilson | Dick Johnson Racing | Ford Falcon (BA) | 22 | + 30.650 | 9 |
| 24 | 66 | (Australia) Dean Canto | Triple Eight Race Engineering | Ford Falcon (BA) | 22 | + 31.159 | 31 |
| 25 | 23 | (Australia) Mark Noske | Noske Motorsport | Ford Falcon (AU) | 21 | + 1 lap | PL |
| Ret | 2 | (Australia) Todd Kelly | Holden Racing Team | Holden Commodore (VY) | 18 | Accident damage | 10 |
| Ret | 7 | (Australia) David Besnard | Rod Nash Racing | Ford Falcon (BA) | 18 | Accident damage | 7 |
| Ret | 45 | (New Zealand) Jason Richards | Team Dynamik | Holden Commodore (VY) | 18 | Accident damage | 23 |
| Ret | 31 | (Australia) Steven Ellery | Steven Ellery Racing | Ford Falcon (BA) | 13 | Accident | 28 |
| Ret | 50 | (Australia) Jason Bright | Paul Weel Racing | Holden Commodore (VX) | 1 | Accident damage | 4 |
| Ret | 34 | (Australia) Garth Tander | Garry Rogers Motorsport | Holden Commodore (VY) | 1 | Gearbox | 16 |
Fastest Lap: Russell Ingall (Stone Brothers Racing) - 1:52.5625 on lap 11

== Championship standings ==
| Pos. | No | Driver | Team | Pts |
|---|---|---|---|---|
| 1 | 4 | (Australia) Marcos Ambrose | Stone Brothers Racing | 1867 |
| 2 | 51 | (New Zealand) Greg Murphy | John Kelly Racing | 1795 |
| 3 | 9 | (Australia) Russell Ingall | Stone Brothers Racing | 1703 |
| 3 | 1 | (Australia) Mark Skaife | Holden Racing Team | 1681 |
| 4 | 6 | (Australia) Craig Lowndes | Ford Performance Racing | 1540 |
