= 2005 V8 Supercars Oran Park round =

Motor race

(New South Wales) 2005 V8 Supercars Oran Park round
Event Information
- Round 8 of 13 in the 2005 V8 Supercar Championship Series
- Date: 12–14 October 2005
- Location: Sydney, New South Wales
- Venue: Oran Park Raceway
- Weather: Sunny

Results
Race 1
Distance	54 laps	150 km
Pole position	Marcos Ambrose; Stone Brothers Racing	1:08.3774
Winner	Steven Richards; Perkins Engineering	01:05:18.7053
Race 2
Distance	54 laps	150 km
Winner	Russell Ingall; Stone Brothers Racing	01:08:50.5625
Round Results
First	Russell Ingall; Stone Brothers Racing	189 pts
Second	Marcos Ambrose; Stone Brothers Racing	180 pts
Third	Greg Murphy; Paul Weel Racing	180 pts

The 2005 V8 Supercars Oran Park round was the eighth round of the 2005 V8 Supercar Championship Series. It was held on the weekend of 12 to 14 August at Oran Park Raceway in Narellan, New South Wales.

Marcos Ambrose took pole position for the second event in succession and was on course for victory in race one. However, a penalty for him and Craig Lowndes saw Steven Richards seize the opportunity to claim victory. Race two would be won by Russell Ingall and the accumulated points saw the Stone Brothers Racing driver secure his sole round victory of the season.

== Background ==
The event was held on the weekend of 12 to 14 August 2005. It was the 34th ATCC/V8 Supercar event to be held at Oran Park Raceway and consisted of two 150 km races with compulsory pitstops each.

During practice, Triple Eight Race Engineering driver Steven Ellery sustained heavy damage to the right-hand side of his car after crashing on the exit of turn nine during practice. As a result, Ellery's car would be withdrawn from the remainder of the weekend.

=== Entry list ===
There were 34 drivers entered into the event which included fifteen BA Ford Falcon's, fifteen VZ Holden Commodore's and two VY Holden Commodore's.

The weekend coincided with the 80th anniversary of the Ford Motor Company in Australia. To commemorate the occasion, all Ford's (with the exception of WPS Racing) carried a windscreen banner that read 'Ford 80' and Ford Performance Racing driver Greg Ritter was entered under the number 80 in lieu of his regular number 5.

== Race report ==
=== Qualifying ===
Marcos Ambrose claimed provisional pole position over Mark Skaife by over one tenth of a second. Steven Ellery did not partake in the qualifying session owing to a practice accident which would sideline him for the duration of the weekend.

Pos.	No.	Driver	Team	Vehicle	Time
1	1	(Australia) Marcos Ambrose	Stone Brothers Racing	Ford Falcon (BA)	1:08.2878
2	2	(Australia) Mark Skaife	Holden Racing Team	Holden Commodore (VZ)	1:08.4221
3	3	(New Zealand) Jason Richards	Tasman Motorsport	Holden Commodore (VZ)	1:08.5576
4	17	(Australia) Steven Johnson	Dick Johnson Racing	Ford Falcon (BA)	1:08.6527
5	9	(Australia) Russell Ingall	Stone Brothers Racing	Ford Falcon (BA)	1:08.6603
6	888	(Australia) Craig Lowndes	Triple Eight Race Engineering	Ford Falcon (BA)	1:08.6834
7	67	(Australia) Paul Morris	Paul Morris Motorsport	Holden Commodore (VZ)	1:08.7054
8	15	(Australia) Rick Kelly	HSV Dealer Team	Holden Commodore (VZ)	1:08.7337
9	16	(Australia) Garth Tander	HSV Dealer Team	Holden Commodore (VZ)	1:08.7471
10	11	(New Zealand) Steven Richards	Perkins Engineering	Holden Commodore (VY)	1:08.7505
11	12	(Australia) John Bowe	Brad Jones Racing	Ford Falcon (BA)	1:08.7818
12	22	(Australia) Todd Kelly	Holden Racing Team	Holden Commodore (VZ)	1:08.7986
13	45	(Brazil) Max Wilson	Team Dynamik	Holden Commodore (VZ)	1:08.9269
14	23	(Australia) Jamie Whincup	Tasman Motorsport	Holden Commodore (VZ)	1:08.9390
15	6	(Australia) Jason Bright	Ford Performance Racing	Ford Falcon (BA)	1:08.9447
16	021	(New Zealand) Paul Radisich	Team Kiwi Racing	Holden Commodore (VZ)	1:08.9912
17	10	(Australia) Jason Bargwanna	Larkham Motorsport	Ford Falcon (BA)	1:08.9940
18	51	(New Zealand) Greg Murphy	Paul Weel Racing	Holden Commodore (VZ)	1:09.0150
19	33	(Australia) Cameron McConville	Garry Rogers Motorsport	Holden Commodore (VZ)	1:09.0410
20	18	(Australia) Glenn Seton	Dick Johnson Racing	Ford Falcon (BA)	1:09.0510
21	21	(Australia) Brad Jones	Brad Jones Racing	Ford Falcon (BA)	1:09.0593
22	44	(New Zealand) Simon Wills	Team Dynamik	Holden Commodore (VZ)	1:09.0653
23	20	(Australia) Mark Winterbottom	Larkham Motorsport	Ford Falcon (BA)	1:09.1008
24	24	(Australia) Paul Dumbrell	Perkins Engineering	Holden Commodore (VY)	1:09.2989
25	48	(Australia) David Besnard	WPS Racing	Ford Falcon (BA)	1:09.3217
26	25	(Australia) Steve Owen	Britek Motorsport	Ford Falcon (BA)	1:09.3466
27	80	(Australia) Greg Ritter	Ford Performance Racing	Ford Falcon (BA)	1:09.4834
28	75	(Australia) Anthony Tratt	Paul Little Racing	Holden Commodore (VY)	1:09.7926
29	34	(Australia) Andrew Jones	Garry Rogers Motorsport	Holden Commodore (VZ)	1:09.8977
30	50	(Australia) Paul Weel	Paul Weel Racing	Holden Commodore (VZ)	1:09.9766
31	7	(Australia) Alex Davison	Rod Nash Racing	Holden Commodore (VY)	1:10.0749
32	52	(Australia) Matthew White	Britek Motorsport	Ford Falcon (BA)	1:10.2452
33	8	(New Zealand) Craig Baird	WPS Racing	Ford Falcon (BA)	1:10.4645
105% time - 1:11.7022
-	88	(Australia) Steven Ellery	Triple Eight Race Engineering	Ford Falcon (BA)	no time

=== Top ten shootout ===
Pos.	No.	Driver	Team	Vehicle	Time
1	1	(Australia) Marcos Ambrose	Stone Brothers Racing	Ford Falcon (BA)	1:08.3774
2	15	(Australia) Rick Kelly	HSV Dealer Team	Holden Commodore (VZ)	1:08.5417
3	2	(Australia) Mark Skaife	Holden Racing Team	Holden Commodore (VZ)	1:08.6434
4	888	(Australia) Craig Lowndes	Triple Eight Race Engineering	Ford Falcon (BA)	1:08.6532
5	9	(Australia) Russell Ingall	Stone Brothers Racing	Ford Falcon (BA)	1:08.7985
6	11	(New Zealand) Steven Richards	Perkins Engineering	Holden Commodore (VY)	1:08.8199
7	67	(Australia) Paul Morris	Paul Morris Motorsport	Holden Commodore (VZ)	1:09.1101
8	16	(Australia) Garth Tander	HSV Dealer Team	Holden Commodore (VZ)	1:09.1136
9	17	(Australia) Steven Johnson	Dick Johnson Racing	Ford Falcon (BA)	1:09.4782
10	3	(New Zealand) Jason Richards	Tasman Motorsport	Holden Commodore (VZ)	1:09.5167

=== Race 1 ===
Pos	No	Driver	Team	Car	Laps	Time/Retired	Grid
1	11	(New Zealand) Steven Richards	Perkins Engineering	Holden Commodore (VY)	54	01:05:18.7053	6
2	9	(Australia) Russell Ingall	Stone Brothers Racing	Ford Falcon (BA)	54	+ 1.325	5
3	51	(New Zealand) Greg Murphy	Paul Weel Racing	Holden Commodore (VZ)	54	+ 1.551	18
4	1	(Australia) Marcos Ambrose	Stone Brothers Racing	Ford Falcon (BA)	54	+ 5.031	1
5	15	(Australia) Rick Kelly	HSV Dealer Team	Holden Commodore (VZ)	54	+ 5.299	2
6	3	(New Zealand) Jason Richards	Tasman Motorsport	Holden Commodore (VZ)	54	+ 7.929	10
7	6	(Australia) Jason Bright	Ford Performance Racing	Ford Falcon (BA)	54	+ 16.211	15
8	33	(Australia) Cameron McConville	Garry Rogers Motorsport	Holden Commodore (VZ)	54	+ 19.752	19
9	888	(Australia) Craig Lowndes	Triple Eight Race Engineering	Ford Falcon (BA)	54	+ 23.784	4
10	17	(Australia) Steven Johnson	Dick Johnson Racing	Ford Falcon (BA)	54	+ 28.596	9
11	10	(Australia) Jason Bargwanna	Larkham Motorsport	Ford Falcon (BA)	54	+ 32.489	17
12	021	(New Zealand) Paul Radisich	Team Kiwi Racing	Holden Commodore (VZ)	54	+ 33.128	16
13	45	(Brazil) Max Wilson	Team Dynamik	Holden Commodore (VZ)	54	+ 33.873	13
14	50	(Australia) Paul Weel	Paul Weel Racing	Holden Commodore (VZ)	54	+ 34.296	30
15	80	(Australia) Greg Ritter	Ford Performance Racing	Ford Falcon (BA)	54	+ 35.933	27
16	2	(Australia) Mark Skaife	Holden Racing Team	Holden Commodore (VZ)	54	+ 37.181	3
17	24	(Australia) Paul Dumbrell	Perkins Engineering	Holden Commodore (VY)	54	+ 44.576	24
18	18	(Australia) Glenn Seton	Dick Johnson Racing	Ford Falcon (BA)	54	+ 45.375	20
19	48	(Australia) David Besnard	WPS Racing	Ford Falcon (BA)	54	+ 46.018	25
20	12	(Australia) John Bowe	Brad Jones Racing	Ford Falcon (BA)	54	+ 48.807	11
21	7	(Australia) Alex Davison	Rod Nash Racing	Holden Commodore (VZ)	54	+ 1:08.510	31
22	75	(Australia) Anthony Tratt	Paul Little Racing	Holden Commodore (VY)	54	+ 1:11.536	28
23	21	(Australia) Brad Jones	Brad Jones Racing	Ford Falcon (BA)	53	+ 1 lap	21
24	52	(Australia) Matthew White	Britek Motorsport	Ford Falcon (BA)	53	+ 1 lap	32
25	34	(Australia) Andrew Jones	Garry Rogers Motorsport	Holden Commodore (VZ)	53	+ 1 lap	29
26	16	(Australia) Garth Tander	HSV Dealer Team	Holden Commodore (VZ)	48	+ 6 laps	8
27	25	(Australia) Steve Owen	Britek Motorsport	Ford Falcon (BA)	41	+ 13 laps	26
Ret	67	(Australia) Paul Morris	Paul Morris Motorsport	Holden Commodore (VZ)	39	Retired	7
Ret	44	(New Zealand) Simon Wills	Team Dynamik	Holden Commodore (VZ)	38	Retired	22
Ret	23	(Australia) Jamie Whincup	Tasman Motorsport	Holden Commodore (VZ)	22	Retired	14
Ret	22	(Australia) Todd Kelly	Holden Racing Team	Holden Commodore (VZ)	14	Retired	12
Ret	20	(Australia) Mark Winterbottom	Larkham Motorsport	Ford Falcon (BA)	7	Retired	23
Ret	8	(New Zealand) Craig Baird	WPS Racing	Ford Falcon (BA)	7	Retired	33
Fastest Lap: Marcos Ambrose (Stone Brothers Racing) - 1:09.4178 on lap 2

=== Race 2 ===
Pos	No	Driver	Team	Car	Laps	Time/Retired	Grid
1	9	(Australia) Russell Ingall	Stone Brothers Racing	Ford Falcon (BA)	54	01:08:50.5625	2
2	1	(Australia) Marcos Ambrose	Stone Brothers Racing	Ford Falcon (BA)	54	+ 6.236	4
3	51	(New Zealand) Greg Murphy	Paul Weel Racing	Holden Commodore (VZ)	54	+ 9.401	3
4	888	(Australia) Craig Lowndes	Triple Eight Race Engineering	Ford Falcon (BA)	54	+ 11.094	9
5	16	(Australia) Garth Tander	HSV Dealer Team	Holden Commodore (VZ)	54	+ 12.645	26
6	15	(Australia) Rick Kelly	HSV Dealer Team	Holden Commodore (VZ)	54	+ 19.545	5
7	6	(Australia) Jason Bright	Ford Performance Racing	Ford Falcon (BA)	54	+ 27.815	7
8	33	(Australia) Cameron McConville	Garry Rogers Motorsport	Holden Commodore (VZ)	54	+ 28.541	8
9	021	(New Zealand) Paul Radisich	Team Kiwi Racing	Holden Commodore (VZ)	54	+ 28.766	12
10	45	(Brazil) Max Wilson	Team Dynamik	Holden Commodore (VZ)	54	+ 29.018	13
11	11	(New Zealand) Steven Richards	Perkins Engineering	Holden Commodore (VY)	54	+ 31.379	1
12	10	(Australia) Jason Bargwanna	Larkham Motorsport	Ford Falcon (BA)	54	+ 32.330	11
13	18	(Australia) Glenn Seton	Dick Johnson Racing	Ford Falcon (BA)	54	+ 32.909	18
14	50	(Australia) Paul Weel	Paul Weel Racing	Holden Commodore (VZ)	54	+ 33.291	14
15	23	(Australia) Jamie Whincup	Tasman Motorsport	Holden Commodore (VZ)	54	+ 33.808	29
16	48	(Australia) David Besnard	WPS Racing	Ford Falcon (BA)	54	+ 34.367	19
17	44	(New Zealand) Simon Wills	Team Dynamik	Holden Commodore (VZ)	54	+ 35.298	29
18	67	(Australia) Paul Morris	Paul Morris Motorsport	Holden Commodore (VZ)	54	+ 37.029	28
19	12	(Australia) John Bowe	Brad Jones Racing	Ford Falcon (BA)	54	+ 39.894	20
20	21	(Australia) Brad Jones	Brad Jones Racing	Ford Falcon (BA)	54	+ 40.262	23
21	75	(Australia) Anthony Tratt	Paul Little Racing	Holden Commodore (VY)	54	+ 44.077	22
22	22	(Australia) Todd Kelly	Holden Racing Team	Holden Commodore (VZ)	54	+ 51.495	31
23	7	(Australia) Alex Davison	Rod Nash Racing	Holden Commodore (VZ)	54	+ 52.334	21
24	24	(Australia) Paul Dumbrell	Perkins Engineering	Holden Commodore (VY)	54	+ 53.710	17
25	34	(Australia) Andrew Jones	Garry Rogers Motorsport	Holden Commodore (VZ)	54	+ 54.042	25
26	25	(Australia) Steve Owen	Britek Motorsport	Ford Falcon (BA)	54	+ 59.340	27
27	20	(Australia) Mark Winterbottom	Larkham Motorsport	Ford Falcon (BA)	53	+ 1 lap	32
28	3	(New Zealand) Jason Richards	Tasman Motorsport	Holden Commodore (VZ)	50	+ 4 laps	6
29	80	(Australia) Greg Ritter	Ford Performance Racing	Ford Falcon (BA)	49	+ 5 laps	15
30	2	(Australia) Mark Skaife	Holden Racing Team	Holden Commodore (VZ)	48	+ 6 laps	16
31	17	(Australia) Steven Johnson	Dick Johnson Racing	Ford Falcon (BA)	45	+ 9 laps	10
Ret	52	(Australia) Matthew White	Britek Motorsport	Ford Falcon (BA)	48	Retired	24
Ret	8	(New Zealand) Craig Baird	WPS Racing	Ford Falcon (BA)	11	Retired	33
Fastest Lap: Marcos Ambrose (Stone Brothers Racing) - 1:09.9220 on lap 10

== Championship standings ==
Pos.	No	Driver	Team	Pts
1	1	(Australia) Marcos Ambrose	Stone Brothers Racing	1346
2	9	(Australia) Russell Ingall	Stone Brothers Racing	1240
9	11	(New Zealand) Steven Richards	Perkins Engineering	1223
4	888	(Australia) Craig Lowndes	Triple Eight Race Engineering	1069
5	22	(Australia) Todd Kelly	Holden Racing Team	1065
