= 2005 Perth 400 =

2005 Supercar Championship event

(Western Australia) 2005 Perth 400
Event Information
- Round 3 of 13 in the 2005 V8 Supercar Championship Series
- Date: 6–8 May 2005
- Location: Perth, Western Australia
- Venue: Barbagallo Raceway
- Weather: Fine

Results
Race 1
| Distance | 50 laps | 120 km |
| Pole position | Craig Lowndes; Triple Eight Race Engineering | 55.6278 |
| Winner | Mark Skaife; Holden Racing Team | 57:21.4908 |
Race 2
| Distance | 58 laps | 140 km |
| Winner | Steven Richards; Perkins Engineering | 1:03:36.5838 |
Race 3
| Distance | 58 laps | 140 km |
| Winner | Russell Ingall; Stone Brothers Racing | 1:01:18.0115 |
Round Results
| First | Steven Richards; Perkins Engineering | 186 pts |
| Second | Russell Ingall; Stone Brothers Racing | 184 pts |
| Third | Marcos Ambrose; Stone Brothers Racing | 178 pts |

The 2005 Perth 400 was the third round of the 2005 V8 Supercar Championship Series. It was held on the week of May 6 to 8 at Barbagallo Raceway in Perth, Western Australia.

The weekend was won by Steven Richards of Perkins Engineering after recording three podiums across the weekend including a race win in the second heat. This marked his first race win since the 2001 Canberra 400 and his first overall round win since Calder Park in 2000. The Stone Brothers Racing pair of Russell Ingall and Marcos Ambrose rounded out the overall podium. Ambrose was at the center of a controversial incident with Mark Skaife that would led to a penalty for the former.

Despite the penalty, Ambrose continued to lead the championship after the completion of the round. Although Ingall had closed the deficit to within eleven points.

== Results ==
=== Qualifying ===
| Pos. | No. | Driver | Team | Vehicle | Time |
|---|---|---|---|---|---|
| 1 | 2 | (Australia) Mark Skaife | Holden Racing Team | Holden Commodore (VZ) | 55.7664 |
| 2 | 11 | (New Zealand) Steven Richards | Perkins Engineering | Holden Commodore (VY) | 55.7691 |
| 3 | 888 | (Australia) Craig Lowndes | Triple Eight Race Engineering | Ford Falcon (BA) | 55.8059 |
| 4 | 1 | (Australia) Marcos Ambrose | Stone Brothers Racing | Ford Falcon (BA) | 55.8301 |
| 5 | 5 | (Australia) Greg Ritter | Ford Performance Racing | Ford Falcon (BA) | 55.9070 |
| 6 | 88 | (Australia) Steven Ellery | Triple Eight Race Engineering | Ford Falcon (BA) | 55.9421 |
| 7 | 16 | (Australia) Garth Tander | HSV Dealer Team | Holden Commodore (VZ) | 55.9476 |
| 8 | 6 | (Australia) Jason Bright | Ford Performance Racing | Ford Falcon (BA) | 55.9498 |
| 9 | 51 | (New Zealand) Greg Murphy | Paul Weel Racing | Holden Commodore (VZ) | 55.9528 |
| 10 | 33 | (Australia) Cameron McConville | Garry Rogers Motorsport | Holden Commodore (VZ) | 55.9639 |
| 11 | 18 | (Australia) Glenn Seton | Dick Johnson Racing | Ford Falcon (BA) | 56.0270 |
| 12 | 9 | (Australia) Russell Ingall | Stone Brothers Racing | Ford Falcon (BA) | 56.0283 |
| 13 | 45 | (Brazil) Max Wilson | Team Dynamik | Holden Commodore (VZ) | 56.0334 |
| 14 | 50 | (Australia) Paul Weel | Paul Weel Racing | Holden Commodore (VZ) | 56.0349 |
| 15 | 22 | (Australia) Todd Kelly | Holden Racing Team | Holden Commodore (VZ) | 56.0456 |
| 16 | 021 | (New Zealand) Paul Radisich | Team Kiwi Racing | Holden Commodore (VZ) | 56.0563 |
| 17 | 3 | (New Zealand) Jason Richards | Tasman Motorsport | Holden Commodore (VZ) | 56.0689 |
| 18 | 12 | (Australia) John Bowe | Brad Jones Racing | Ford Falcon (BA) | 56.0701 |
| 19 | 23 | (Australia) Jamie Whincup | Tasman Motorsport | Holden Commodore (VZ) | 56.0785 |
| 20 | 17 | (Australia) Steven Johnson | Dick Johnson Racing | Ford Falcon (BA) | 56.0933 |
| 21 | 67 | (Australia) Paul Morris | Paul Morris Motorsport | Holden Commodore (VZ) | 56.0976 |
| 22 | 44 | (New Zealand) Simon Wills | Team Dynamik | Holden Commodore (VZ) | 56.1042 |
| 23 | 20 | (Australia) Mark Winterbottom | Larkham Motorsport | Ford Falcon (BA) | 56.1797 |
| 24 | 15 | (Australia) Rick Kelly | HSV Dealer Team | Holden Commodore (VZ) | 56.2117 |
| 25 | 10 | (Australia) Jason Bargwanna | Larkham Motorsport | Ford Falcon (BA) | 56.2273 |
| 26 | 48 | (Australia) David Besnard | WPS Racing | Ford Falcon (BA) | 56.2598 |
| 27 | 34 | (Australia) Andrew Jones | Garry Rogers Motorsport | Holden Commodore (VZ) | 56.3477 |
| 28 | 21 | (Australia) Brad Jones | Brad Jones Racing | Ford Falcon (BA) | 56.3597 |
| 29 | 52 | (Australia) Matthew White | Britek Motorsport | Ford Falcon (BA) | 56.3980 |
| 30 | 8 | (New Zealand) Craig Baird | WPS Racing | Ford Falcon (BA) | 56.4813 |
| 31 | 7 | (Australia) Paul Dumbrell | Rod Nash Racing | Holden Commodore (VZ) | 56.4906 |
| 32 | 75 | (Australia) Anthony Tratt | Paul Little Racing | Holden Commodore (VY) | 56.9345 |

=== Top Ten Shootout ===
Lowndes secured pole position by besting nearest competitor Marcos Ambrose's time by over a tenth of a second.

| Pos. | No. | Driver | Team | Vehicle | Time |
|---|---|---|---|---|---|
| 1 | 888 | (Australia) Craig Lowndes | Triple Eight Race Engineering | Ford Falcon (BA) | 55.6278 |
| 2 | 1 | (Australia) Marcos Ambrose | Stone Brothers Racing | Ford Falcon (BA) | 55.7388 |
| 3 | 11 | (New Zealand) Steven Richards | Perkins Engineering | Holden Commodore (VY) | 55.8155 |
| 4 | 2 | (Australia) Mark Skaife | Holden Racing Team | Holden Commodore (VZ) | 55.8240 |
| 5 | 33 | (Australia) Cameron McConville | Garry Rogers Motorsport | Holden Commodore (VZ) | 55.8898 |
| 6 | 6 | (Australia) Jason Bright | Ford Performance Racing | Ford Falcon (BA) | 56.1582 |
| 7 | 16 | (Australia) Garth Tander | HSV Dealer Team | Holden Commodore (VZ) | 56.2158 |
| 8 | 51 | (New Zealand) Greg Murphy | Paul Weel Racing | Holden Commodore (VZ) | 56.3028 |
| 9 | 5 | (Australia) Greg Ritter | Ford Performance Racing | Ford Falcon (BA) | 56.6184 |
| 10 | 88 | (Australia) Steven Ellery | Triple Eight Race Engineering | Ford Falcon (BA) | 56.6452 |

=== Race 1 ===
| Pos | No | Driver | Team | Car | Laps | Time | Grid |
|---|---|---|---|---|---|---|---|
| 1 | 2 | (Australia) Mark Skaife | Holden Racing Team | Holden Commodore (VZ) | 50 | 57:21.4908 | 4 |
| 2 | 1 | (Australia) Marcos Ambrose | Stone Brothers Racing | Ford Falcon (BA) | 50 | + 0.285 | 2 |
| 3 | 11 | (New Zealand) Steven Richards | Perkins Engineering | Holden Commodore (VY) | 50 | + 0.666 | 3 |
| 4 | 9 | (Australia) Russell Ingall | Stone Brothers Racing | Ford Falcon (BA) | 50 | + 2.835 | 12 |
| 5 | 51 | (New Zealand) Greg Murphy | Paul Weel Racing | Holden Commodore (VZ) | 50 | + 3.047 | 8 |
| 6 | 021 | (New Zealand) Paul Radisich | Team Kiwi Racing | Holden Commodore (VZ) | 50 | + 4.908 | 16 |
| 7 | 3 | (New Zealand) Jason Richards | Tasman Motorsport | Holden Commodore (VZ) | 50 | + 5.168 | 17 |
| 8 | 33 | (Australia) Cameron McConville | Garry Rogers Motorsport | Holden Commodore (VZ) | 50 | + 7.444 | 5 |
| 9 | 10 | (Australia) Jason Bargwanna | Larkham Motorsport | Ford Falcon (BA) | 50 | + 8.009 | 25 |
| 10 | 67 | (Australia) Paul Morris | Paul Morris Motorsport | Holden Commodore (VZ) | 50 | + 8.277 | 21 |
| 11 | 17 | (Australia) Steven Johnson | Dick Johnson Racing | Ford Falcon (BA) | 50 | + 8.499 | 20 |
| 12 | 18 | (Australia) Glenn Seton | Dick Johnson Racing | Ford Falcon (BA) | 50 | + 9.453 | 11 |
| 13 | 23 | (Australia) Jamie Whincup | Tasman Motorsport | Holden Commodore (VZ) | 50 | + 9.979 | 19 |
| 14 | 15 | (Australia) Rick Kelly | HSV Dealer Team | Holden Commodore (VZ) | 50 | + 12.366 | 24 |
| 15 | 12 | (Australia) John Bowe | Brad Jones Racing | Ford Falcon (BA) | 50 | + 12.616 | 18 |
| 16 | 6 | (Australia) Jason Bright | Ford Performance Racing | Ford Falcon (BA) | 50 | + 12.745 | 6 |
| 17 | 48 | (Australia) David Besnard | WPS Racing | Ford Falcon (BA) | 50 | + 13.069 | 26 |
| 18 | 44 | (New Zealand) Simon Wills | Team Dynamik | Holden Commodore (VZ) | 50 | + 13.287 | 22 |
| 19 | 8 | (New Zealand) Craig Baird | WPS Racing | Ford Falcon (BA) | 50 | + 13.713 | 30 |
| 20 | 20 | (Australia) Mark Winterbottom | Larkham Motorsport | Ford Falcon (BA) | 50 | + 15.281 | 23 |
| 21 | 888 | (Australia) Craig Lowndes | Triple Eight Race Engineering | Ford Falcon (BA) | 50 | + 15.417 | 1 |
| 22 | 7 | (Australia) Paul Dumbrell | Rod Nash Racing | Holden Commodore (VZ) | 50 | + 16.822 | 31 |
| 23 | 75 | (Australia) Anthony Tratt | Paul Little Racing | Holden Commodore (VY) | 50 | + 18.160 | 32 |
| 24 | 52 | (Australia) Matthew White | Britek Motorsport | Ford Falcon (BA) | 50 | + 18.369 | 29 |
| 25 | 21 | (Australia) Brad Jones | Brad Jones Racing | Ford Falcon (BA) | 50 | + 18.889 | 28 |
| 26 | 34 | (Australia) Andrew Jones | Garry Rogers Motorsport | Holden Commodore (VZ) | 50 | + 20.318 | 27 |
| 27 | 50 | (Australia) Paul Weel | Paul Weel Racing | Holden Commodore (VZ) | 49 | + 1 lap | 14 |
| 28 | 5 | (Australia) Greg Ritter | Ford Performance Racing | Ford Falcon (BA) | 48 | + 2 laps | 9 |
| 29 | 16 | (Australia) Garth Tander | HSV Dealer Team | Holden Commodore (VZ) | 46 | + 4 laps | 7 |
| 30 | 88 | (Australia) Steven Ellery | Triple Eight Race Engineering | Ford Falcon (BA) | 46 | + 4 laps | 10 |
| 31 | 45 | (Brazil) Max Wilson | Team Dynamik | Holden Commodore (VZ) | 42 | + 8 laps | 13 |
| Ret | 22 | (Australia) Todd Kelly | Holden Racing Team | Holden Commodore (VZ) | 13 | Retired | 15 |
Fastest Lap: Mark Skaife (Holden Racing Team) - 0:56.3747 on lap 12

=== Race 2 ===
| Pos | No | Driver | Team | Car | Laps | Time | Grid |
|---|---|---|---|---|---|---|---|
| 1 | 11 | (New Zealand) Steven Richards | Perkins Engineering | Holden Commodore (VY) | 58 | 01:03:36.5838 | 3 |
| 2 | 9 | (Australia) Russell Ingall | Stone Brothers Racing | Ford Falcon (BA) | 58 | + 2.839 | 4 |
| 3 | 888 | (Australia) Craig Lowndes | Triple Eight Race Engineering | Ford Falcon (BA) | 58 | + 4.765 | 21 |
| 4 | 17 | (Australia) Steven Johnson | Dick Johnson Racing | Ford Falcon (BA) | 58 | + 6.048 | 11 |
| 5 | 1 | (Australia) Marcos Ambrose | Stone Brothers Racing | Ford Falcon (BA) | 58 | + 6.388 | 2 |
| 6 | 50 | (Australia) Paul Weel | Paul Weel Racing | Holden Commodore (VZ) | 58 | + 6.804 | 27 |
| 7 | 6 | (Australia) Jason Bright | Ford Performance Racing | Ford Falcon (BA) | 58 | + 9.303 | 16 |
| 8 | 021 | (New Zealand) Paul Radisich | Team Kiwi Racing | Holden Commodore (VZ) | 58 | + 10.858 | 6 |
| 9 | 33 | (Australia) Cameron McConville | Garry Rogers Motorsport | Holden Commodore (VZ) | 58 | + 11.119 | 8 |
| 10 | 10 | (Australia) Jason Bargwanna | Larkham Motorsport | Ford Falcon (BA) | 58 | + 14.209 | 9 |
| 11 | 12 | (Australia) John Bowe | Brad Jones Racing | Ford Falcon (BA) | 58 | + 19.087 | 15 |
| 12 | 48 | (Australia) David Besnard | WPS Racing | Ford Falcon (BA) | 58 | + 21.255 | 17 |
| 13 | 88 | (Australia) Steven Ellery | Triple Eight Race Engineering | Ford Falcon (BA) | 58 | + 21.407 | 30 |
| 14 | 16 | (Australia) Garth Tander | HSV Dealer Team | Holden Commodore (VZ) | 58 | + 22.705 | 29 |
| 15 | 18 | (Australia) Glenn Seton | Dick Johnson Racing | Ford Falcon (BA) | 58 | + 23.645 | 12 |
| 16 | 15 | (Australia) Rick Kelly | HSV Dealer Team | Holden Commodore (VZ) | 58 | + 25.928 | 14 |
| 17 | 67 | (Australia) Paul Morris | Paul Morris Motorsport | Holden Commodore (VZ) | 58 | + 26.698 | 10 |
| 18 | 45 | (Brazil) Max Wilson | Team Dynamik | Holden Commodore (VZ) | 58 | + 27.010 | 31 |
| 19 | 21 | (Australia) Brad Jones | Brad Jones Racing | Ford Falcon (BA) | 58 | + 27.283 | 25 |
| 20 | 8 | (New Zealand) Craig Baird | WPS Racing | Ford Falcon (BA) | 58 | + 27.462 | 19 |
| 21 | 34 | (Australia) Andrew Jones | Garry Rogers Motorsport | Holden Commodore (VZ) | 58 | + 27.661 | 26 |
| 22 | 52 | (Australia) Matthew White | Britek Motorsport | Ford Falcon (BA) | 58 | + 28.590 | 24 |
| 23 | 22 | (Australia) Todd Kelly | Holden Racing Team | Holden Commodore (VZ) | 58 | + 32.684 | 32 |
| 24 | 23 | (Australia) Jamie Whincup | Tasman Motorsport | Holden Commodore (VZ) | 57 | + 1 lap | 13 |
| 25 | 3 | (New Zealand) Jason Richards | Tasman Motorsport | Holden Commodore (VZ) | 57 | + 1 lap | 7 |
| 26 | 75 | (Australia) Anthony Tratt | Paul Little Racing | Holden Commodore (VY) | 57 | + 1 lap | 23 |
| 27 | 20 | (Australia) Mark Winterbottom | Larkham Motorsport | Ford Falcon (BA) | 54 | + 4 laps | 20 |
| 28 | 44 | (New Zealand) Simon Wills | Team Dynamik | Holden Commodore (VZ) | 50 | + 8 laps | 18 |
| 29 | 2 | (Australia) Mark Skaife | Holden Racing Team | Holden Commodore (VZ) | 44 | + 14 laps | 1 |
| 30 | 51 | (New Zealand) Greg Murphy | Paul Weel Racing | Holden Commodore (VZ) | 44 | + 14 laps | 5 |
| Ret | 7 | (Australia) Paul Dumbrell | Rod Nash Racing | Holden Commodore (VZ) | 2 | Retired | 22 |
| Ret | 5 | (Australia) Greg Ritter | Ford Performance Racing | Ford Falcon (BA) | 0 | Retired | 28 |
Fastest Lap: Marcos Ambrose (Stone Brothers Racing) - 0:56.5059 on lap 12

=== Race 3 ===
| Pos | No | Driver | Team | Car | Laps | Time | Grid |
|---|---|---|---|---|---|---|---|
| 1 | 9 | (Australia) Russell Ingall | Stone Brothers Racing | Ford Falcon (BA) | 58 | 01:01:18.0115 | 2 |
| 2 | 11 | (New Zealand) Steven Richards | Perkins Engineering | Holden Commodore (VY) | 58 | + 0.519 | 1 |
| 3 | 1 | (Australia) Marcos Ambrose | Stone Brothers Racing | Ford Falcon (BA) | 58 | + 2.929 | 5 |
| 4 | 50 | (Australia) Paul Weel | Paul Weel Racing | Holden Commodore (VZ) | 58 | + 10.903 | 6 |
| 5 | 17 | (Australia) Steven Johnson | Dick Johnson Racing | Ford Falcon (BA) | 58 | + 12.937 | 4 |
| 6 | 2 | (Australia) Mark Skaife | Holden Racing Team | Holden Commodore (VZ) | 58 | + 13.143 | 29 |
| 7 | 22 | (Australia) Todd Kelly | Holden Racing Team | Holden Commodore (VZ) | 58 | + 13.232 | 23 |
| 8 | 12 | (Australia) John Bowe | Brad Jones Racing | Ford Falcon (BA) | 58 | + 13.742 | 11 |
| 9 | 18 | (Australia) Glenn Seton | Dick Johnson Racing | Ford Falcon (BA) | 58 | + 15.462 | 15 |
| 10 | 88 | (Australia) Steven Ellery | Triple Eight Race Engineering | Ford Falcon (BA) | 58 | + 15.738 | 13 |
| 11 | 67 | (Australia) Paul Morris | Paul Morris Motorsport | Holden Commodore (VZ) | 58 | + 18.219 | 17 |
| 12 | 10 | (Australia) Jason Bargwanna | Larkham Motorsport | Ford Falcon (BA) | 58 | + 19.511 | 10 |
| 13 | 16 | (Australia) Garth Tander | HSV Dealer Team | Holden Commodore (VZ) | 58 | + 19.803 | 14 |
| 14 | 23 | (Australia) Jamie Whincup | Tasman Motorsport | Holden Commodore (VZ) | 58 | + 20.137 | 24 |
| 15 | 15 | (Australia) Rick Kelly | HSV Dealer Team | Holden Commodore (VZ) | 58 | + 21.868 | 16 |
| 16 | 8 | (New Zealand) Craig Baird | WPS Racing | Ford Falcon (BA) | 58 | + 22.510 | 20 |
| 17 | 3 | (New Zealand) Jason Richards | Tasman Motorsport | Holden Commodore (VZ) | 58 | + 26.342 | 25 |
| 18 | 44 | (New Zealand) Simon Wills | Team Dynamik | Holden Commodore (VZ) | 58 | + 26.510 | 28 |
| 19 | 33 | (Australia) Cameron McConville | Garry Rogers Motorsport | Holden Commodore (VZ) | 58 | + 27.764 | 9 |
| 20 | 48 | (Australia) David Besnard | WPS Racing | Ford Falcon (BA) | 58 | + 27.944 | 12 |
| 21 | 20 | (Australia) Mark Winterbottom | Larkham Motorsport | Ford Falcon (BA) | 58 | + 28.235 | 27 |
| 22 | 6 | (Australia) Jason Bright | Ford Performance Racing | Ford Falcon (BA) | 58 | + 32.161 | 7 |
| 23 | 75 | (Australia) Anthony Tratt | Paul Little Racing | Holden Commodore (VY) | 57 | + 1 lap | 26 |
| 24 | 7 | (Australia) Paul Dumbrell | Rod Nash Racing | Holden Commodore (VZ) | 57 | + 1 lap | 32 |
| 25 | 34 | (Australia) Andrew Jones | Garry Rogers Motorsport | Holden Commodore (VZ) | 57 | + 1 lap | 21 |
| 26 | 52 | (Australia) Matthew White | Britek Motorsport | Ford Falcon (BA) | 57 | + 1 lap | 22 |
| Ret | 45 | (Brazil) Max Wilson | Team Dynamik | Holden Commodore (VZ) | 45 | Retired | 18 |
| Ret | 51 | (New Zealand) Greg Murphy | Paul Weel Racing | Holden Commodore (VZ) | 45 | Retired | 30 |
| Ret | 21 | (Australia) Brad Jones | Brad Jones Racing | Ford Falcon (BA) | 37 | Retired | 19 |
| Ret | 5 | (Australia) Greg Ritter | Ford Performance Racing | Ford Falcon (BA) | 36 | Retired | 31 |
| Ret | 888 | (Australia) Craig Lowndes | Triple Eight Race Engineering | Ford Falcon (BA) | 29 | Retired | 3 |
| Ret | 021 | (New Zealand) Paul Radisich | Team Kiwi Racing | Holden Commodore (VZ) | 1 | Retired | 8 |
Fastest Lap: Marcos Ambrose (Stone Brothers Racing) - 0:56.4974 on lap 9
