= Ford Falcon (AU) =

Australian full-size car

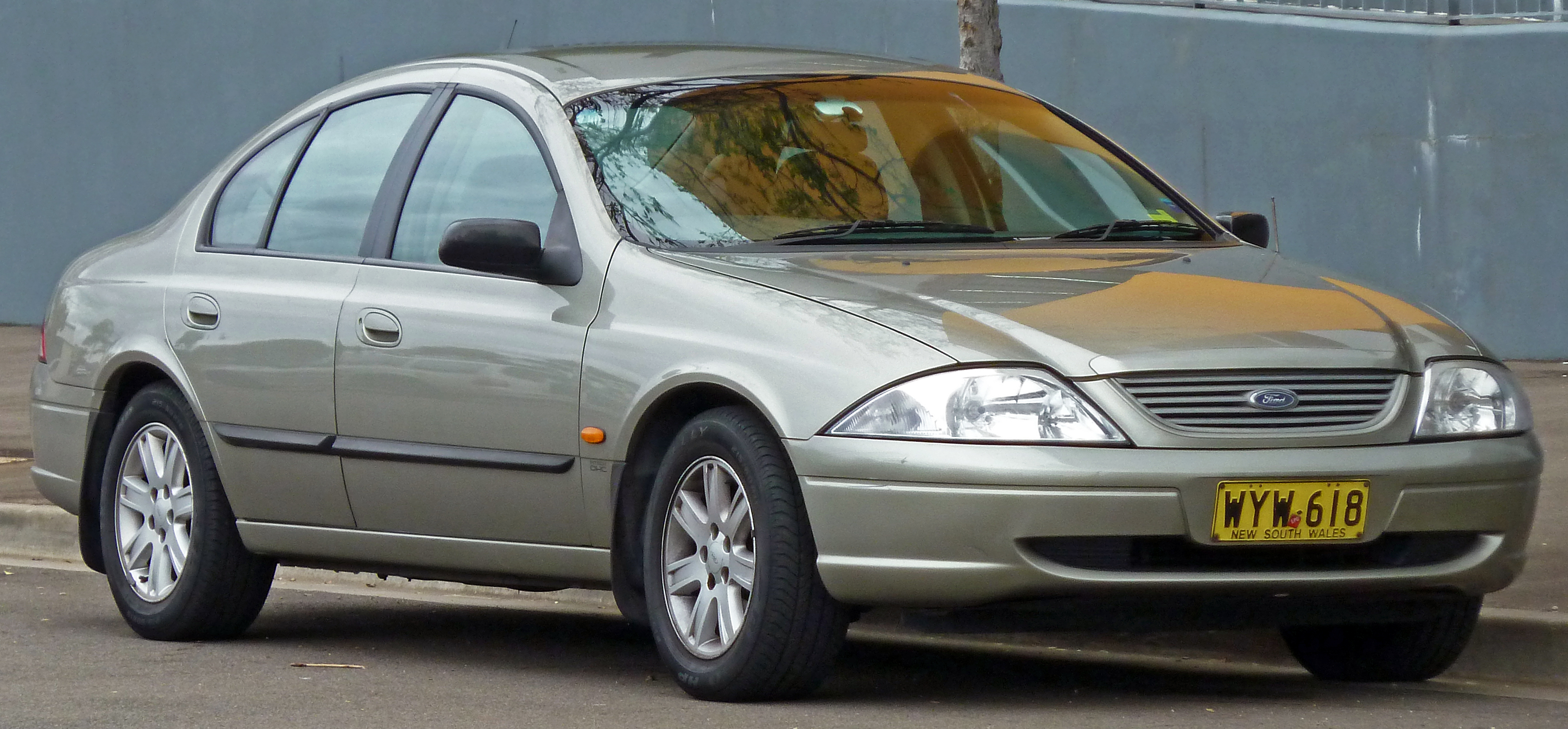
- Ford Falcon Forté sedan (Series II)

Overview
- Manufacturer: Ford Australia
- Also called: Ford Fairmont (AU); FTE TE50; FTE TS50
- Production: September 1998 – September 2002
- Assembly: Australia: Melbourne, Victoria (Broadmeadows)
- Designer: Graham Wadsworth

Body and chassis
- Class: Full-size car
- Body style: 2-door cab chassis 2-door coupe utility 4-door sedan 5-door station wagon
- Layout: Front-engine, rear-wheel drive
- Platform: EA169
- Related: Ford Fairlane (AU); Ford LTD (AU)

Powertrain
- Engine: 4.0 L Intech I6 (petrol); 4.0 L Intech E-Gas I6 (LPG); 4.0 L Intech HP I6 (petrol); 4.0 L Intech VCT I6 (petrol); 5.0 L Windsor V8 (petrol); 5.0 L Synergy 5000 V8 (petrol); 5.6 L Windsor V8 (petrol)
- Transmission: 4-speed M93LE automatic (I6); 4-speed M97LE automatic (V8); 5-speed Tremec T-5 manual

Dimensions
- Wheelbase: 2,793–2,922 mm (110.0–115.0 in)
- Length: 4,907–5,058 mm (193.2–199.1 in)
- Width: 1,870–1,871 mm (73.6–73.7 in)
- Height: 1,437 mm (56.6 in)
- Kerb weight: 1,437–1,645 kg (3,168–3,627 lb)

Chronology
- Predecessor: Ford Falcon (EL)
- Successor: Ford Falcon (BA)

The Ford Falcon (AU) is a full-size car that was produced by Ford Australia from 1998 to 2002. It was also available as the Ford Fairmont, the luxury variant, and as the Ford TE50 / Ford TS50, the sports variants.

It succeeded the EL series, and was the first iteration of the sixth generation Ford Falcon. The long-wheelbase Ford Fairlane and LTD released in 1999.

It was built on the EA169 platform, developed for the AU Falcon.

== Development ==
The AU was conceived under "Project Eagle" that began in February 1993, and gained the official codename "EA169" in 1994. The program cost A$700 million before product launch

Ford Australia gave consideration to a revamped fifth generation Falcon and an imported replacement such as the American front-wheel drive Taurus, rear-wheel drive Crown Victoria, European rear-wheel drive Scorpio, and reportedly the Japanese rear-wheel drive Mazda 929 (then part of the Ford conglomerate). Ford chose to do a substantial redesign of the indigenous platform, due to concerns about the Australian market preference for high towing capacity, large interior size and local employment. factors: the fact that the import models had limited body style options (sedan only or sedan and wagon) and no capability to use a V8 engine.

The AU Falcon utilised Ford's New Edge design language, with the aim of the design to attract a younger generation of buyers with avant-garde looks, however, in Australia it polarized public opinion to the benefit of the more organically designed rival, the Holden Commodore (VT).

The AU series had a very efficient drag coefficient of Cd=0.295 for the sedan (an 11% improvement over the preceding EL series) and 0.34 for the wagon.

Key changes from the fifth generation Falcon included a 35 kg (77 lb) reduction in weight for the base car, 17.5 per cent stiffer bodyshell, and an eight per cent improvement in fuel consumption. The "Falcon" and "Futura" badges used the original 1950s font.

Independent Rear Suspension (IRS) became available as standard on some models and optional on others, with a double wishbone design on an isolated subframe). IRS was an option on the base Forte, Fairmont and 'S' models, and standard on Fairmont Ghia, XR6 VCT and XR8 models.

== Safety ==
ANCAP test results* Ford Falcon AU 2 Forte sedan (2000)
Test	Score
Overall	3 /5 stars
Frontal offset	11.07/16
Side impact	13.13/16
Pole	Not Assessed
Seat belt reminders	0/3
Whiplash protection	Not Assessed
Pedestrian protection	Marginal
Electronic stability control	Not Assessed

== Powertrains ==
The updated 6-cylinder engines incorporated advanced features such as VCT on some models and a temperature sensor in the cylinder head, which detected coolant loss and allowed the car to "limp home" safely by cutting cylinders.

The engine range comprised: the base Intech model producing 157 kW (211 hp), with a revised cylinder head featuring smaller valve stems, larger exhaust valves, and different rocker ratio, as well as a revised piston and longer conrod and a cast aluminium cross-bolted oil sump (with the same power output as the EL series); an "HP" version reserved to the XR6 producing 164 kW (220 hp) (thanks to: unique cylinder head; reshaped inlet port; redesigned exhaust port; 'open' combustion chamber shape to restrict pre-detonation from hot spot areas; unique camshaft; higher fuel pressure; recalibrated EEC V engine management system); the VCT version producing 172 kW (231 hp) for the XR6 VCT; a "Windsor" V8 producing 185 kW (248 hp) (also carried over from the EL series but without major upgrades).

Transmissions were improved for better shift feel and the auto was recalibrated to better suit the upgraded engines. The six and eight cylinder models had a 4-speed BTR M93LE and M97LE automatic transmission, respectively. The automatic XR series models had an "adaptive shift" with five shifting strategies depending on driving conditions. The manual transmission, where available, was a 5-speed T5 model.

== Model changes ==
=== Series I (AU) ===
The first series of the AU Falcon was launched in September 1998 and remained on sale until a major upgrade in April 2000. It was marketed under the new slogan "I've come a long way, baby.".

The standard AU range included:

- Falcon Forté, 4.0 L, "Intech" I6, Sedan/Wagon, 157 kW (211 hp), 357 N⋅m (263 lb⋅ft)
- Falcon Forté, 5.0 L, "Windsor" V8, Sedan, 175 kW (235 hp), 395 N⋅m (291 lb⋅ft)
- Falcon Futura, 4.0 L, "Intech" I6, Sedan/Wagon, 157 kW (211 hp), 357 N⋅m (263 lb⋅ft)
- Falcon S, 4.0 L, "Intech" I6, Sedan, 157 kW (211 hp), 357 N⋅m (263 lb⋅ft)
- Falcon XR6, 4.0 L, "HP Intech" I6, Sedan, 164 kW (220 hp), 366 N⋅m (270 lb⋅ft)
- Falcon XR6 VCT, 4.0 L, "Intech VCT" I6, Sedan, 172 kW (231 hp), 374 N⋅m (276 lb⋅ft)
- Falcon XR8, 5.0 L, "Windsor" V8, Sedan, 185 kW (248 hp), 412 N⋅m (304 lb⋅ft)
- Fairmont, 4.0 L, "Intech" I6, Sedan/Wagon, 157 kW (211 hp), 357 N⋅m (263 lb⋅ft)
- Fairmont Ghia, 4.0 L, "Intech VCT" I6, Sedan, 168 kW (225 hp), 370 N⋅m (270 lb⋅ft)
- Fairmont Ghia, 5.0 L, "Windsor" V8, Sedan, 175 kW (235 hp), 395 N⋅m (291 lb⋅ft)

Tickford Vehicle Engineering, was responsible for the XR models that carried the "Tickford" wings badge. From July 1999, the newly formed Ford Tickford Experience (FTE) launched the following higher-specification and performance T series (T1) models:

- TE50, 5.0 L, "Synergy 5000" V8, Sedan, 200 kW (270 hp), 420 N⋅m (310 lb⋅ft)
- TS50, 5.0 L, "Synergy 5000" V8, Sedan, 220 kW (300 hp), 435 N⋅m (321 lb⋅ft), automatic only.

The new Forté model was the replacement of the old GLi designation. It was designed and marketed to attract to fleet buyers as well as younger, more inexperienced drivers. When new, the car was competitively priced at A$30,690 with automatic transmission and air conditioning (at the time an option on the other Australian-made rivals) fitted as standard.

The more 'up-spec' model was called the Futura, which was marketed as a family-oriented safety package in the same vogue as the rival Holden Commodore Acclaim. The Futura differed from the Forté in having a body coloured grille, standard ABS, cruise control, alloy wheels and a digital clock fitted in the centre console (series I only). The price of the car when new was A$34,990.

The Ford Falcon S (for Sporty) sedan was also based on the Forté but designed as an entry-level sports edition. It achieved this through additional features such as body-coloured grille, alloy wheels, S decals on the rear quarters and bootlid, and a high-level spoiler. The colour choices were limited to Venom (Red), Liquid Silver, White, Galaxy (Metallic Blue) and Silhouette (Black). Ford eventually offered a "ESP" option pack that added an LSD equipped IRS and ABS to the S-pack.

The XR series was the high performance end of the range. It originally comprised the XR6 HP, XR6 VCT, and XR8 models all sharing a unique quad-lamp front bumper bar and non-high end bonnet. All series I XR's could have the option of a full Tickford bodykit and unique bi-plane rear spoiler.

The Fairmont was the entry level luxury model of the AU range to face-off its main rival, the Holden Berlina. It had all of the fittings of the Futura but included extras such as a honeycomb grille, an 80-second headlamp off delay, wood grain-look dash inserts, unique 15-inch wheels, dual horns, Fairmont badging on the boot lid and an analogue clock. The Fairmont was offered in sedan and station wagon bodystyles. Above the Fairmont was the Fairmont Ghia, which was the highest non-performance specification model in the range and sedan only. It had additional features that included unique 16-inch wheels, toggleable traction control, 4-channel ABS, 250-watt audio system with separate amplifier, 11 speakers, and more wood grain-look dash inserts. Fairmont & Fairmont Ghia models were not badged as Falcons.

In terms of safety equipment, the Futura, XR and Fairmont models all had ABS brakes in addition to a driver's airbag, which was the only main safety feature on the Falcon S and Forté. The brakes featured 287x24 mm vented front discs and 287x10.5 mm solid rear discs.

External model differentiation was achieved via the use of different grilles and bonnets (low bonnet and vertical "salad slicer" grille on Forté, horizontal single bar on Futura, integrated quad-lamp bumper bar and grille on the XR sports range; high bonnet and large grille on Fairmont range) and more basic fittings such as different alloy wheel designs, rear light clusters (clear turn signals on Fairmont), body colour-coordination and chrome fittings. The wagons featured a new rear-end relative to the previous generation Falcons. Inside, the Fairmont and XR model featured full instrumentation (oil and battery meters) and the Fairmont twins also adopted a different dashboard. As opposed to the standard Falcon featuring a large oval pod incorporating air conditioning and stereo, the luxury twin featured a 2-level shared with the long-wheelbase AU Fairlane/LTD, with a separate upper level featuring a woodgrain-like trim across to the passenger side that incorporated an analogue clock, trip computer and climate control.

Only the Falcon XR6 VCT and Fairmont Ghia featured "Intech" engines produced by Tickford Vehicle Engineering with variable valve timing. The VCT was developed by Tickford in conjunction with Unisia Jecs who also supplied Jaguar for its V8 engines. IRS was fitted as standard on the Falcon XR6 VCT, XR8 and Fairmont Ghia, and optional on most other sedan models; the XR models being the only ones that could also be fitted with a limited-slip differential.

In May 1999, the AU range received a minor update, introducing a bigger brake booster, front power windows for the Forté and XR6 and lowering the rear suspension of non-XR variants by 24 mm. To heighten its interior quality, the Forté was offered with 'medium graphite' interior trim (slightly darker than originally) and the patterned seat material was changed from the bolsters to the seat centres. Buyers were also able to order the darker 'warm charcoal' colour scheme of other Falcon variants.

The only limited edition launched with this initial series, was the Falcon Classic of June 1999 marketed till October 1999 to boost sales. It inherited an eggcrate grille from the non-XR Utility range, dual airbags, ABS brakes, cruise control, upgraded sound system, a "warm charcoal" interior, power aerial, special trim, 15-inch alloys, low profile rear spoiler, bumper inserts and paint. Its recommended retail price was A$30,690.

Utility

The range of AU Falcon Utility vehicles was launched in June 1999. It offered Falcon XL, XLS, XR6 and XR8 style side utility models, a cab-chassis model and a cab-chassis with factory fitted drop-side tray. The latter was the first tray utility vehicle that Ford Australia had produced for several years.

The body of the AU Falcon utility differed in design from the competing Holden Utility in that the cargo tray was separate from the cab, whereas the tray was an integral part of the body shell in the Holden. As a result, this allowed the rear to accept different after market body types, including tray decks, service bodies, and camper van shells. Unlike the sedan, the AU Falcon utility vehicles were very popular amongst tradespeople and individuals alike.

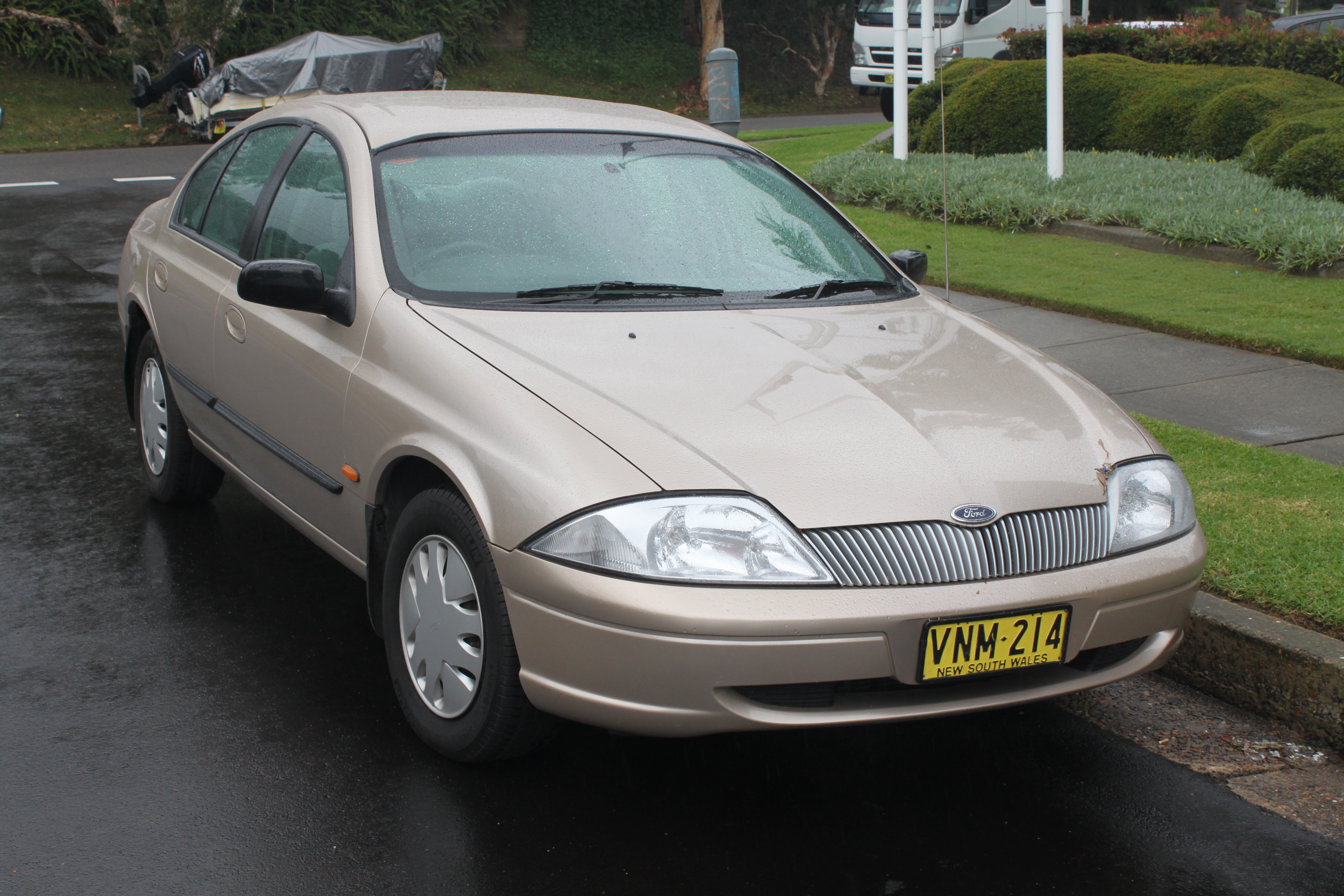
Falcon Forté

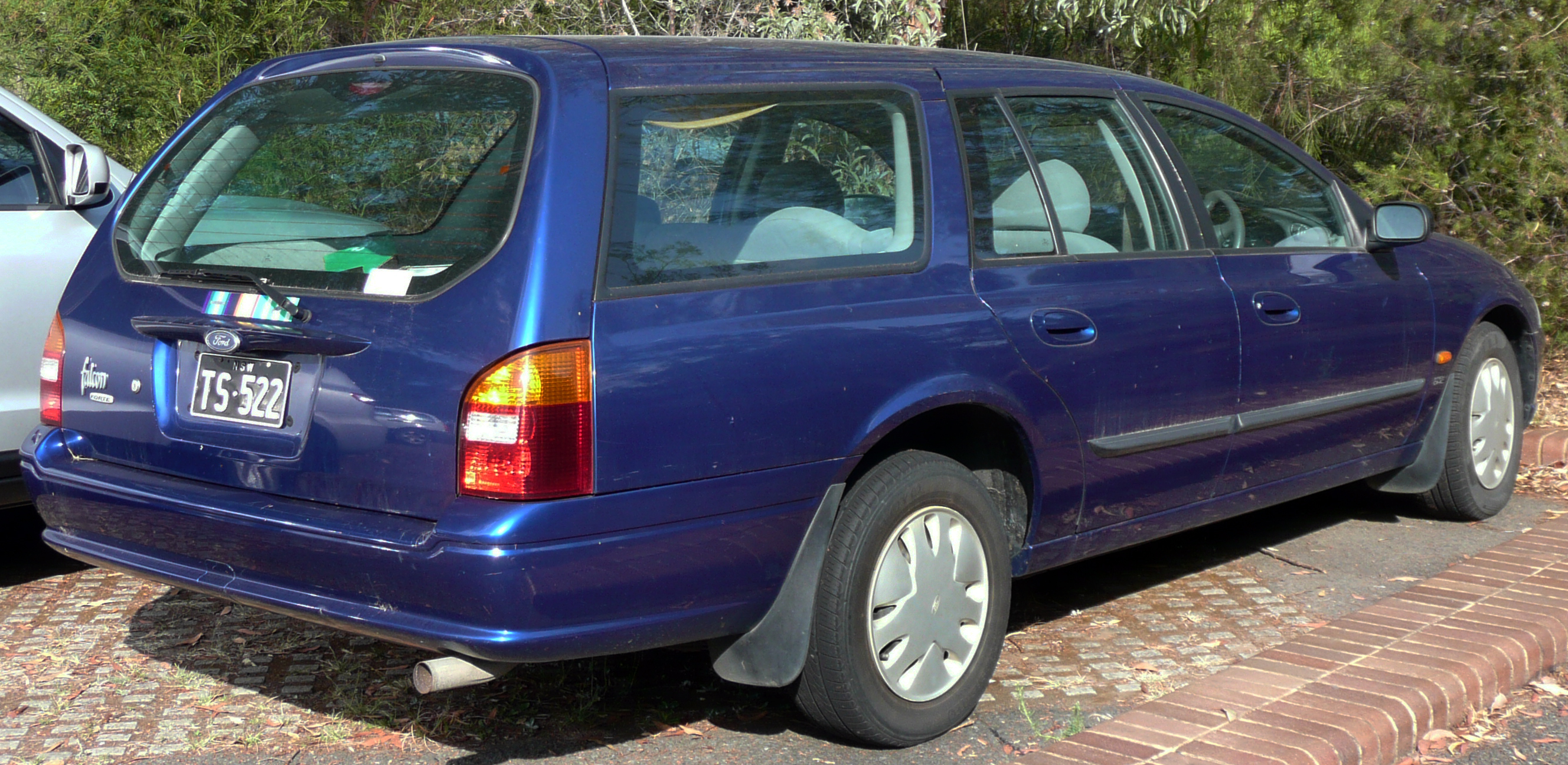
Falcon Forté wagon

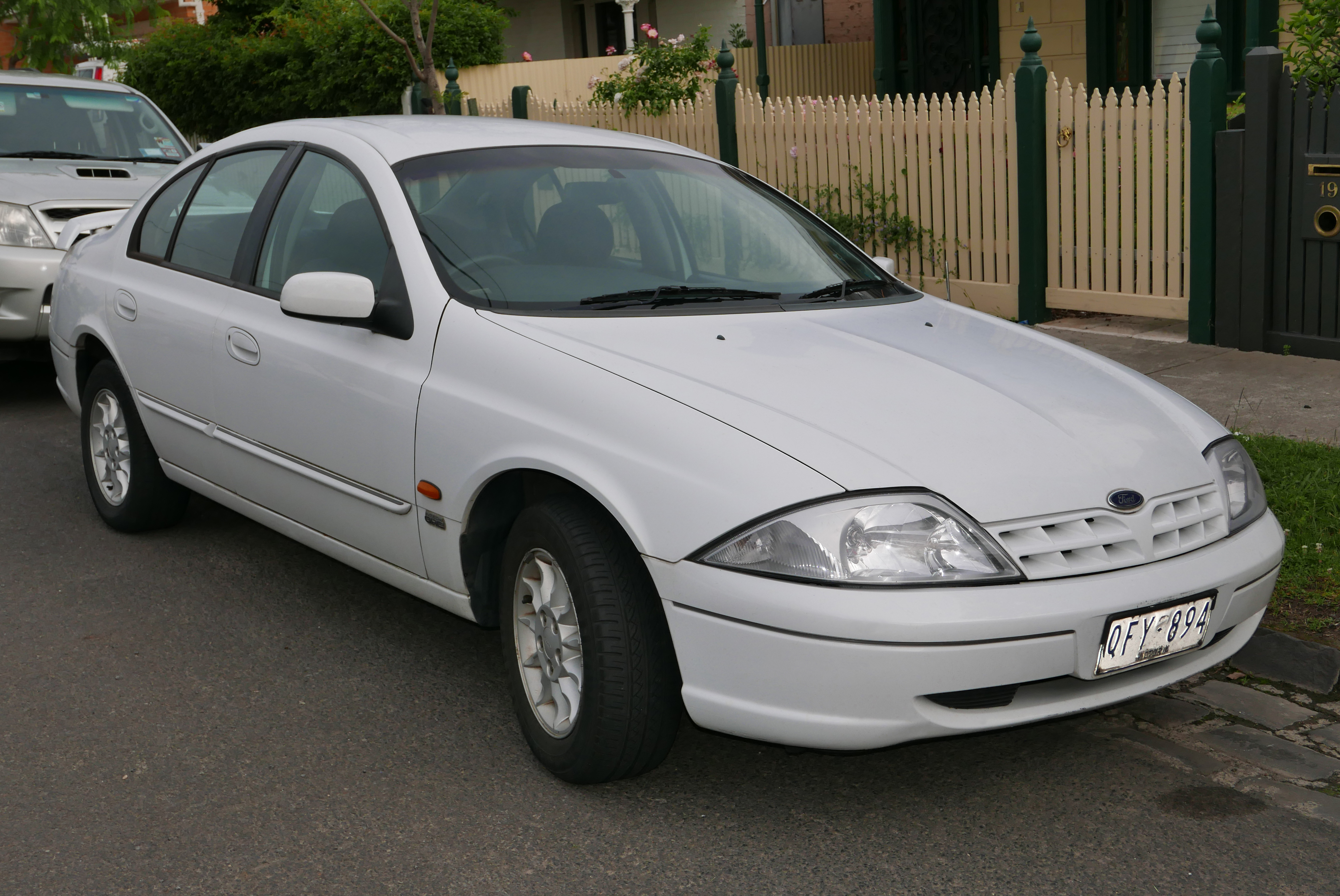
Falcon Classic

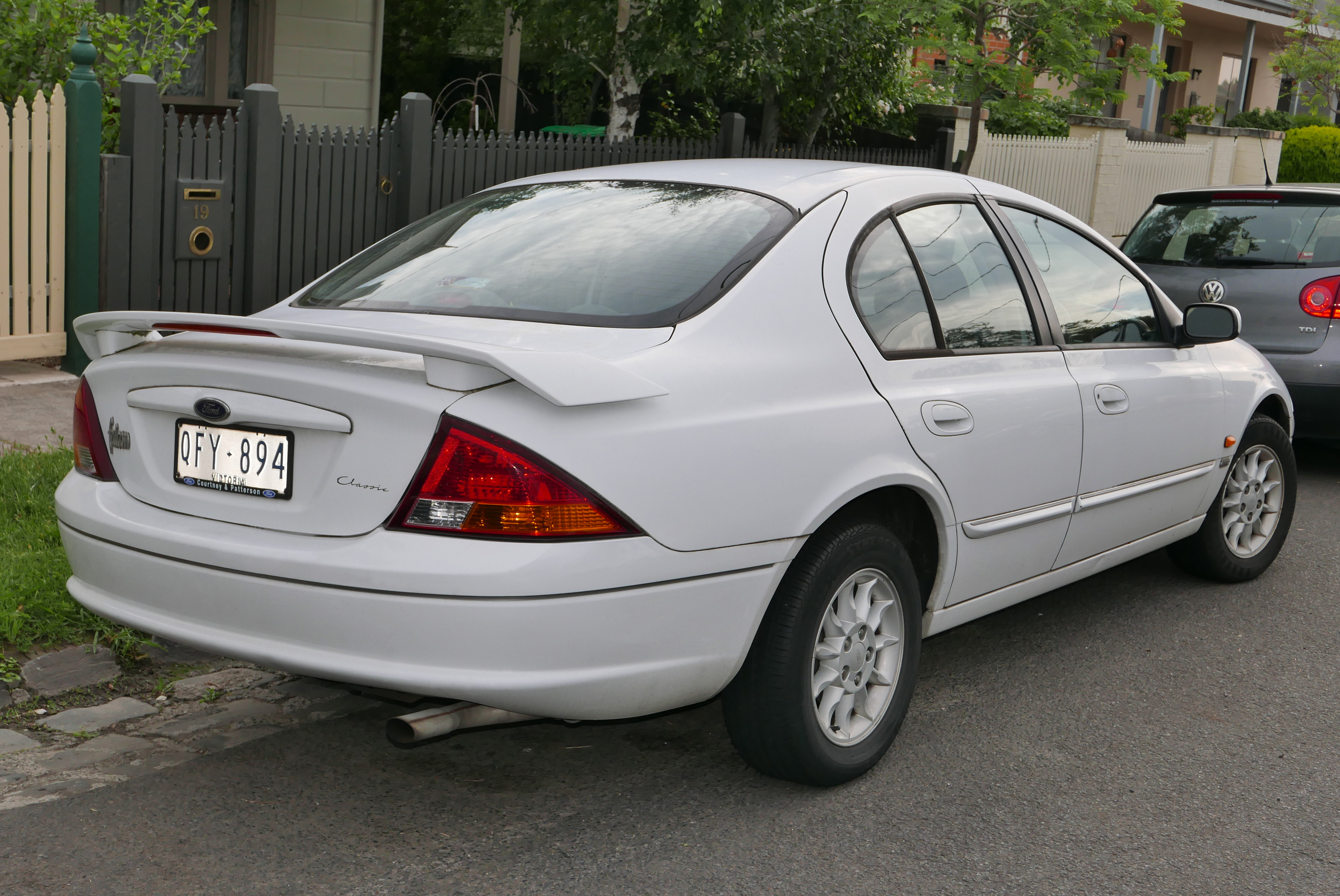
Falcon Classic

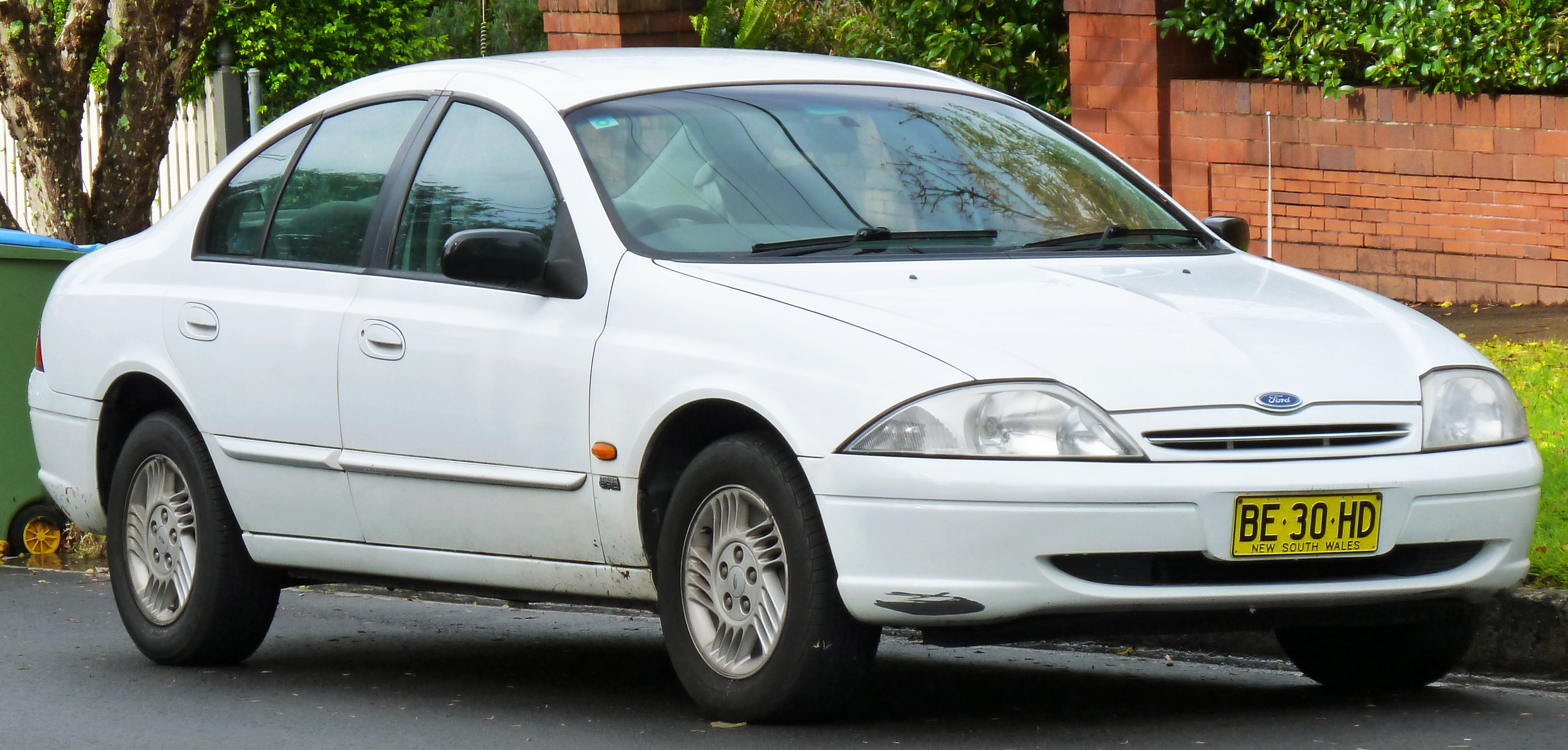
Futura

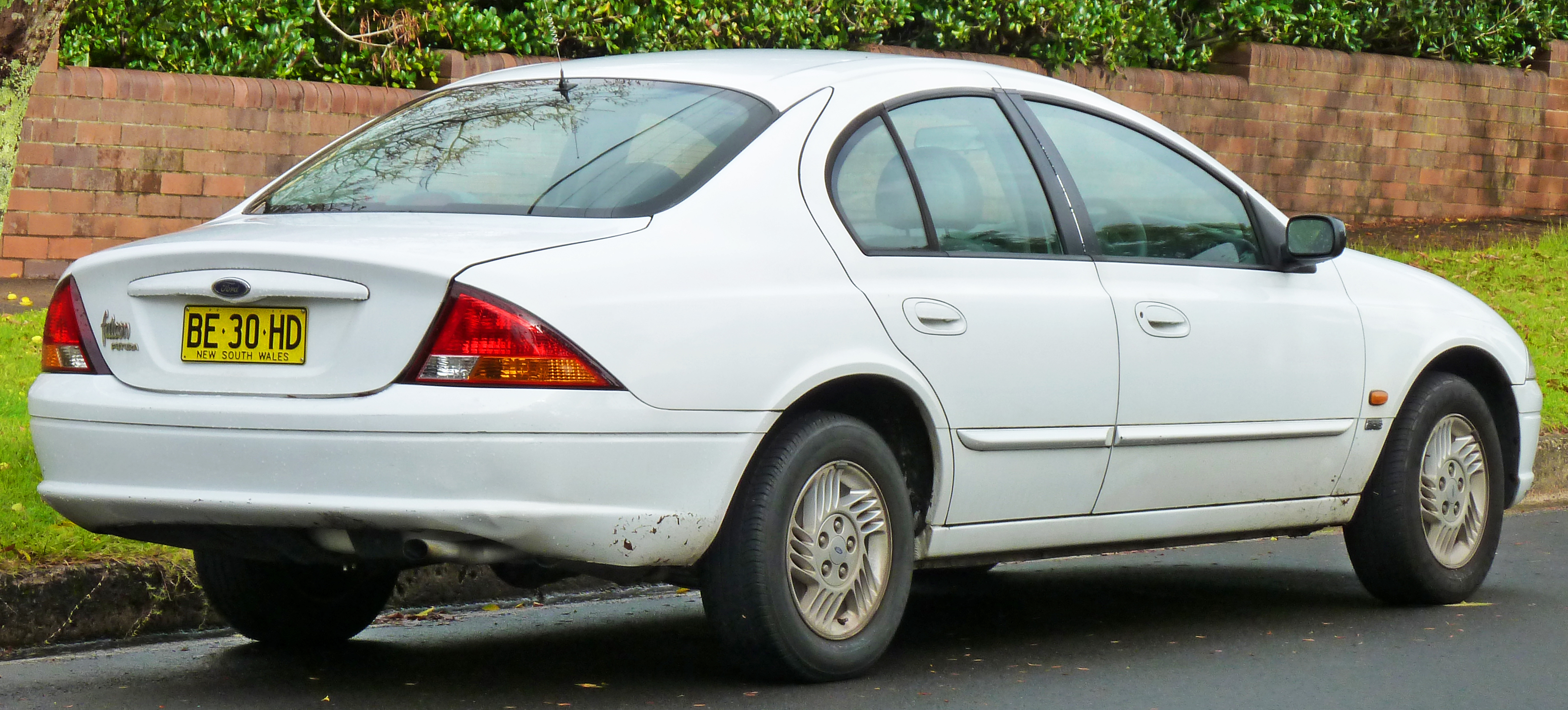
Futura

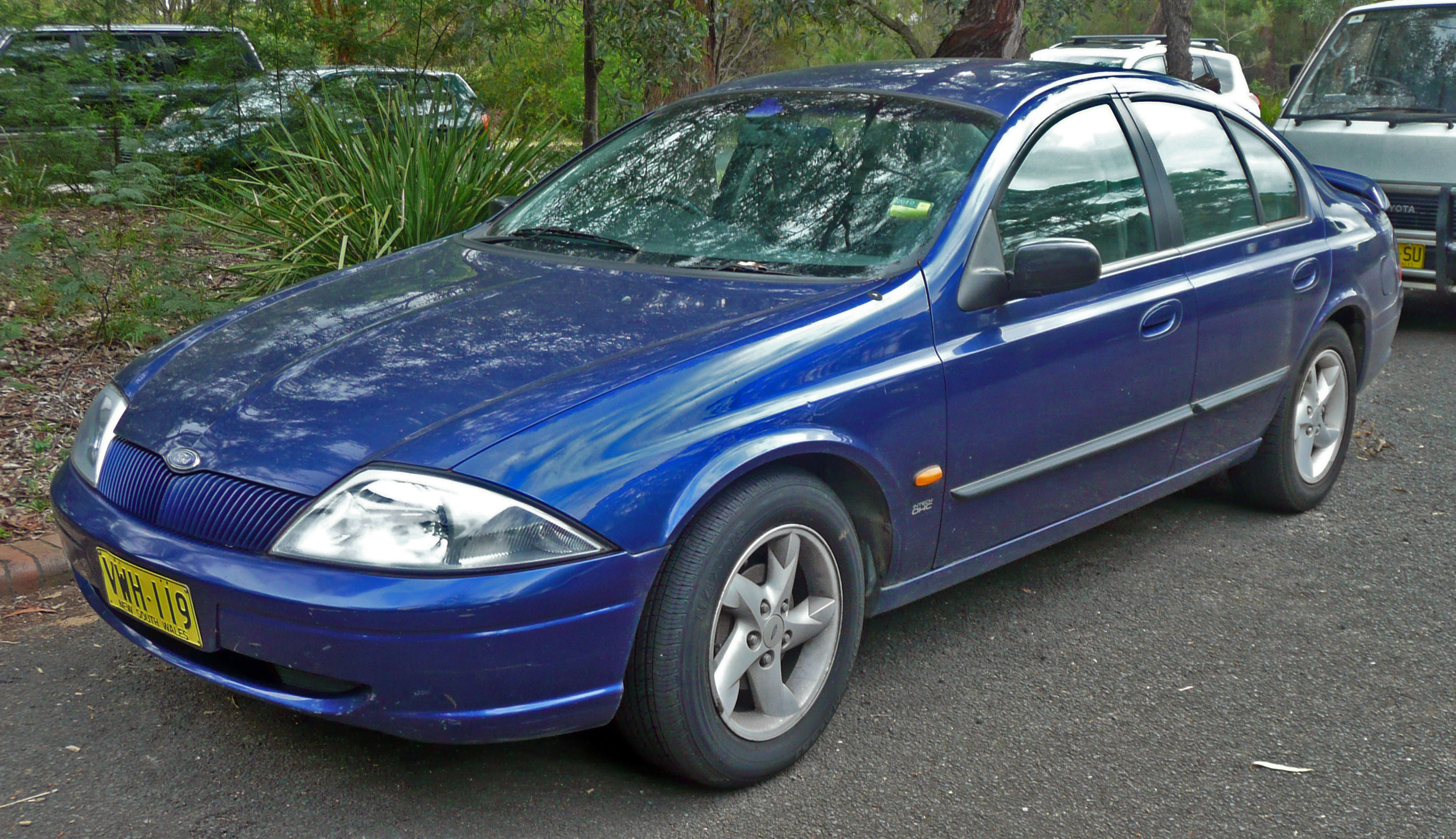
Falcon S

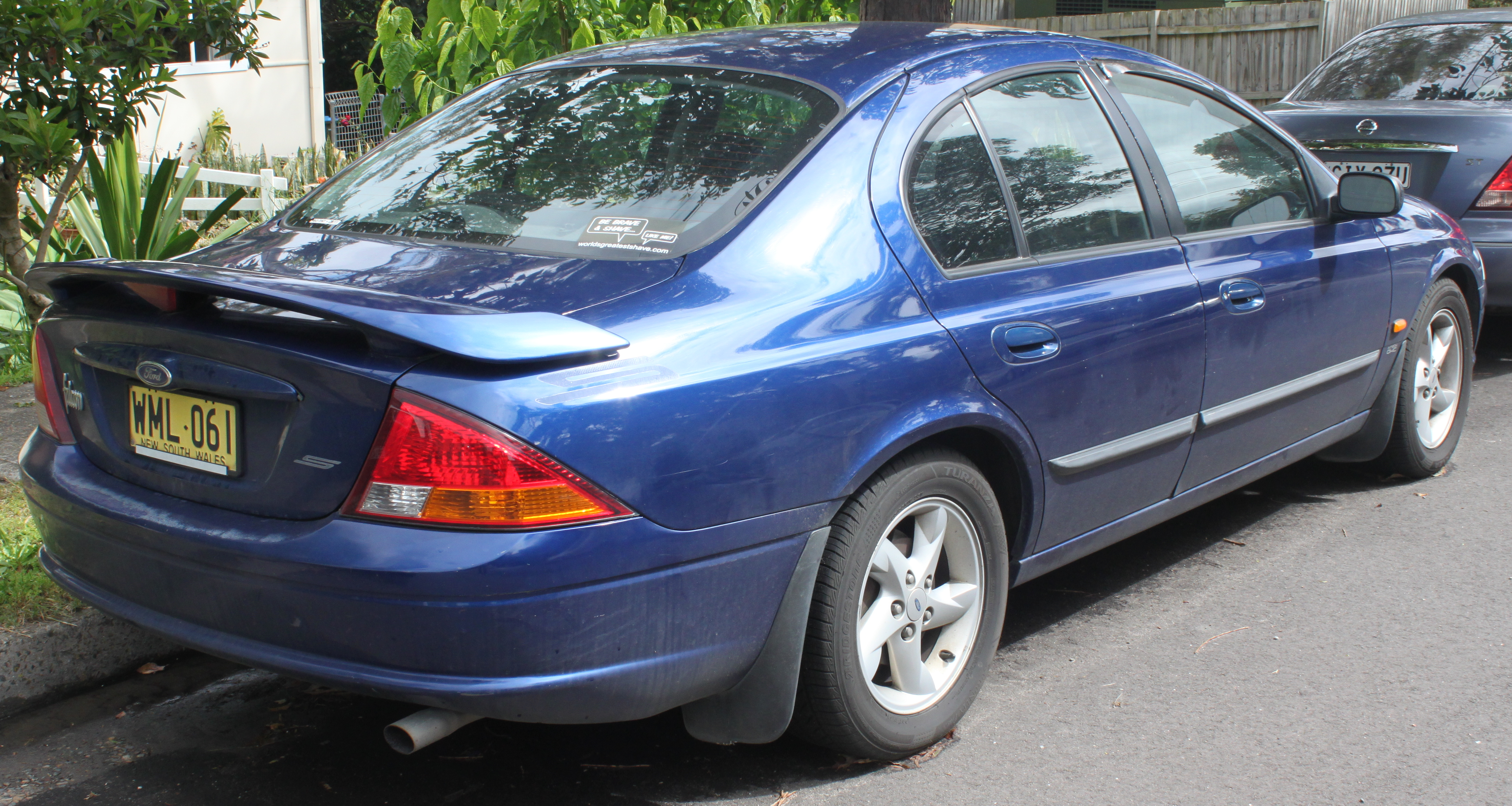
Falcon S

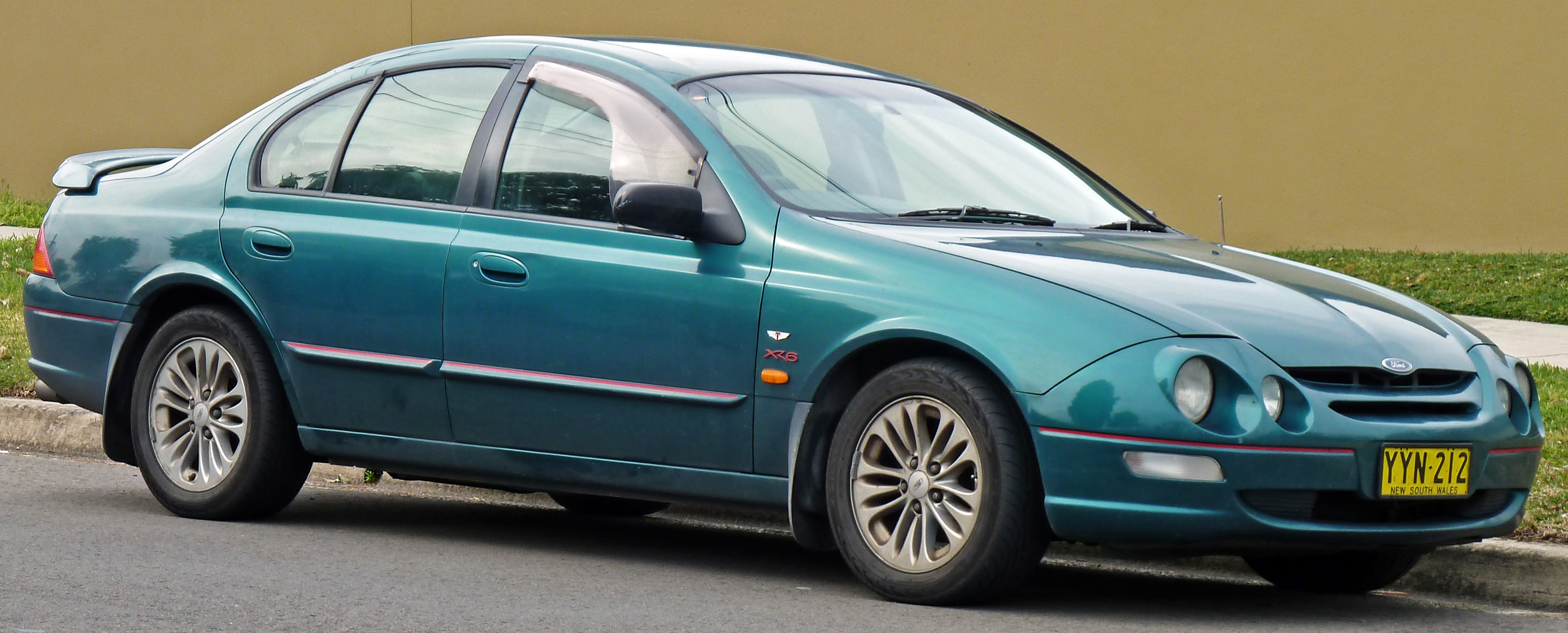
Falcon XR6

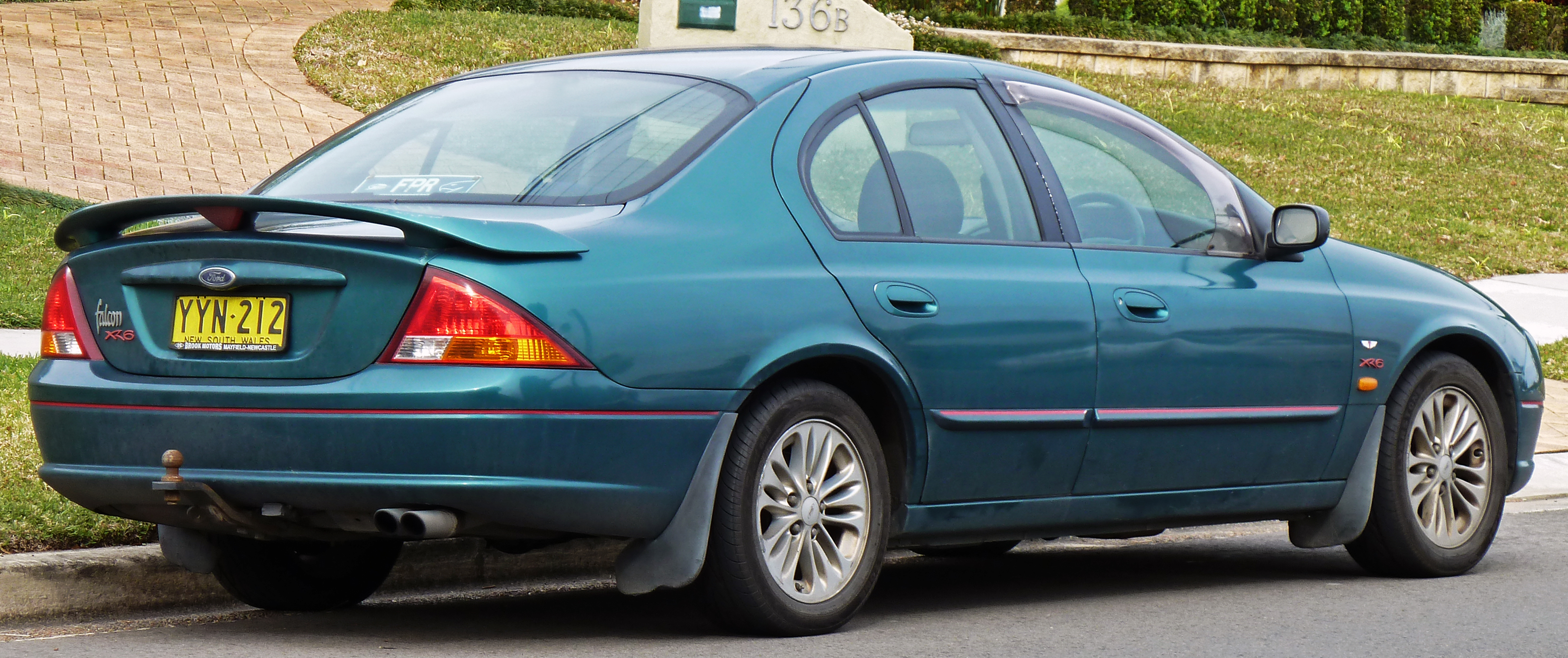
Falcon XR6

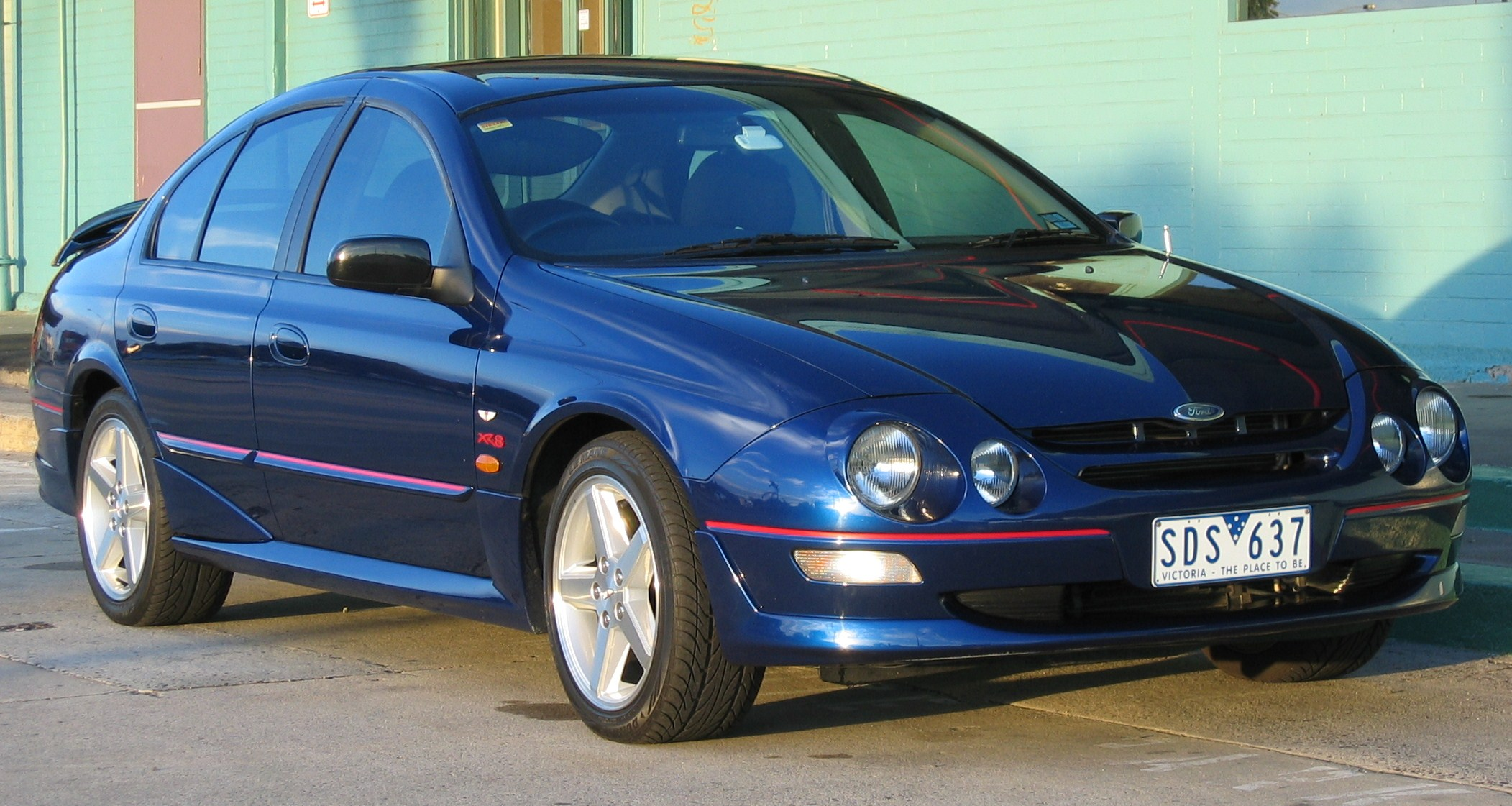
Falcon XR8

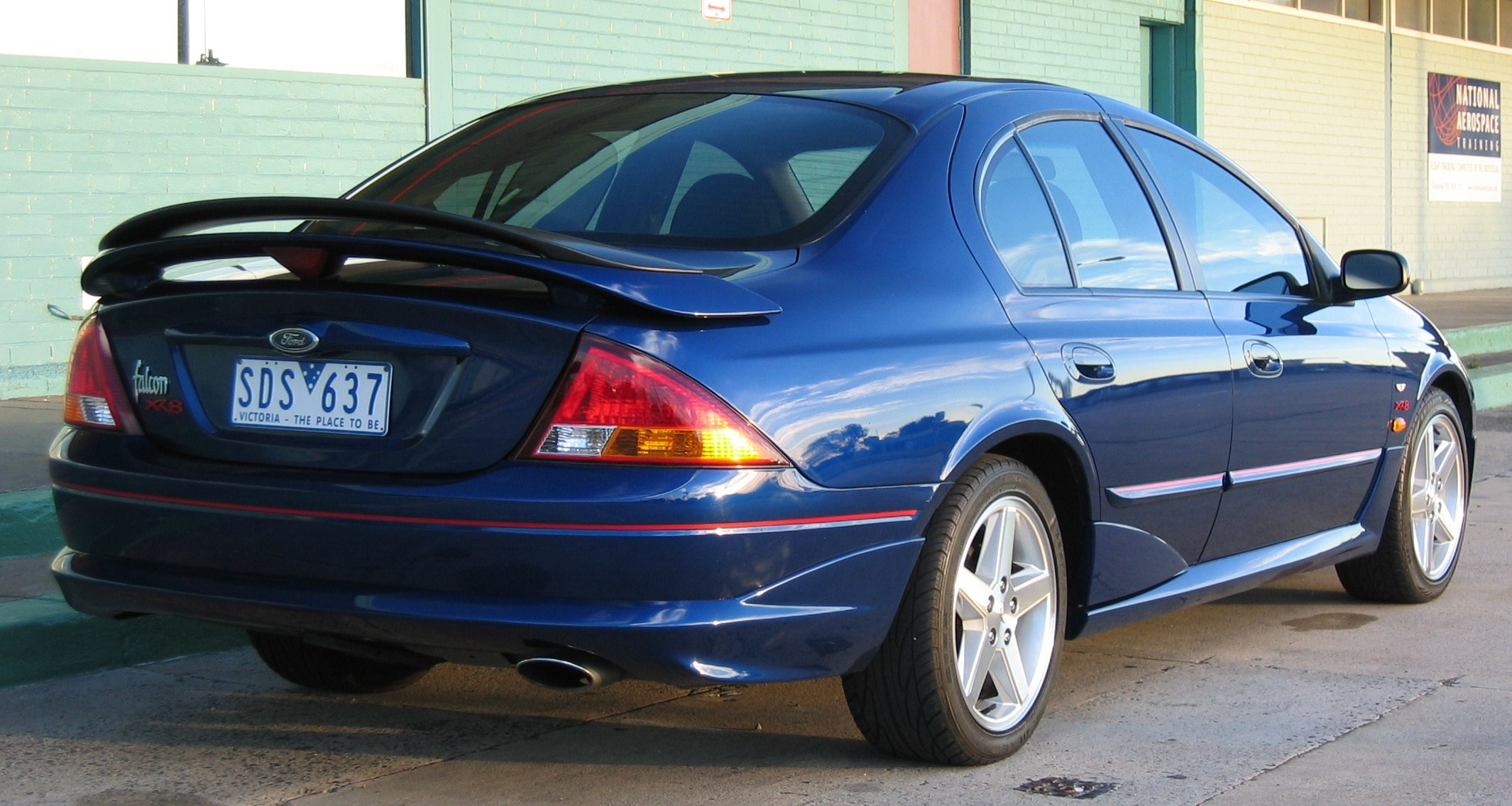
Falcon XR8 with optional rear bi-wing

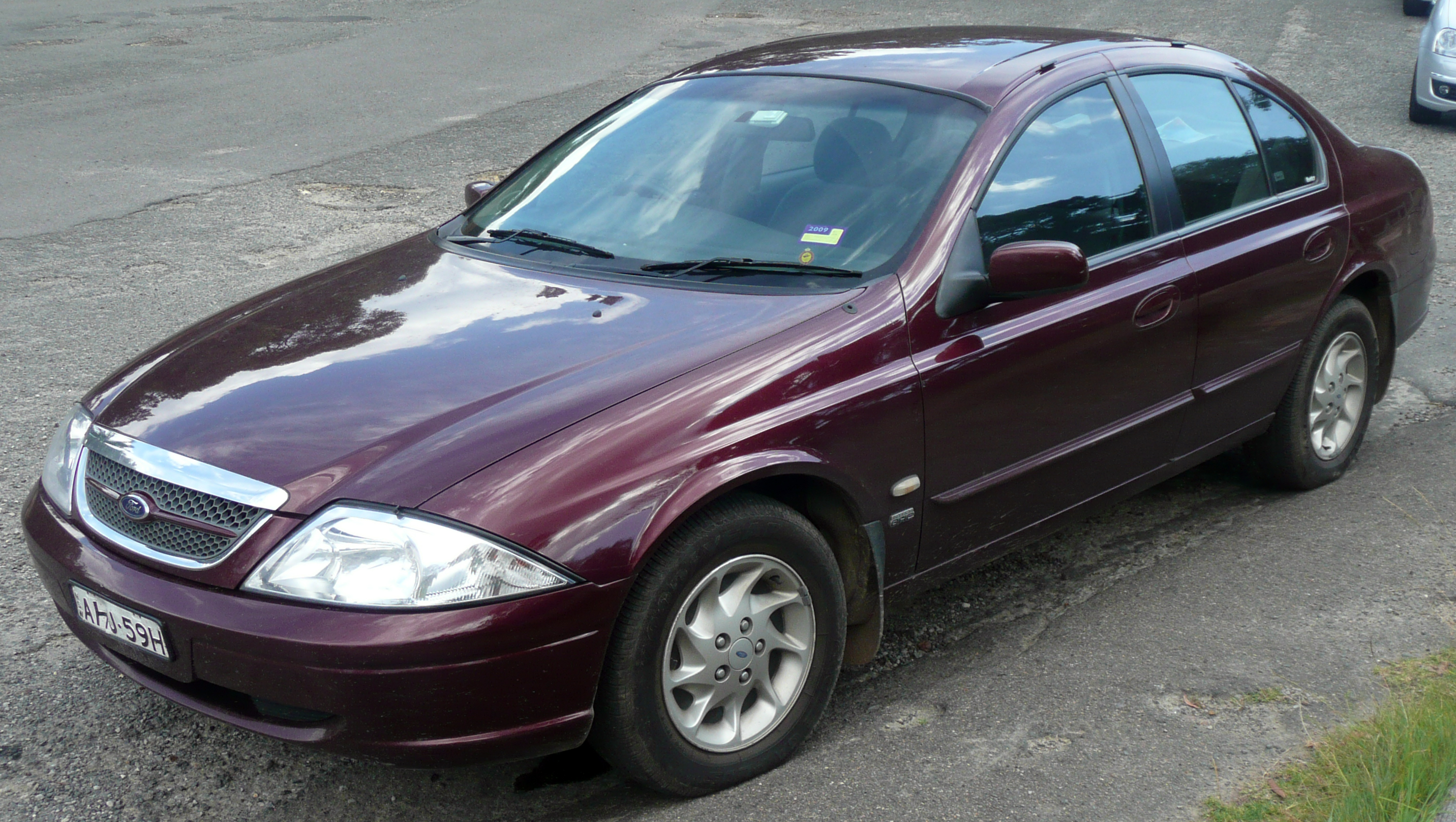
Fairmont

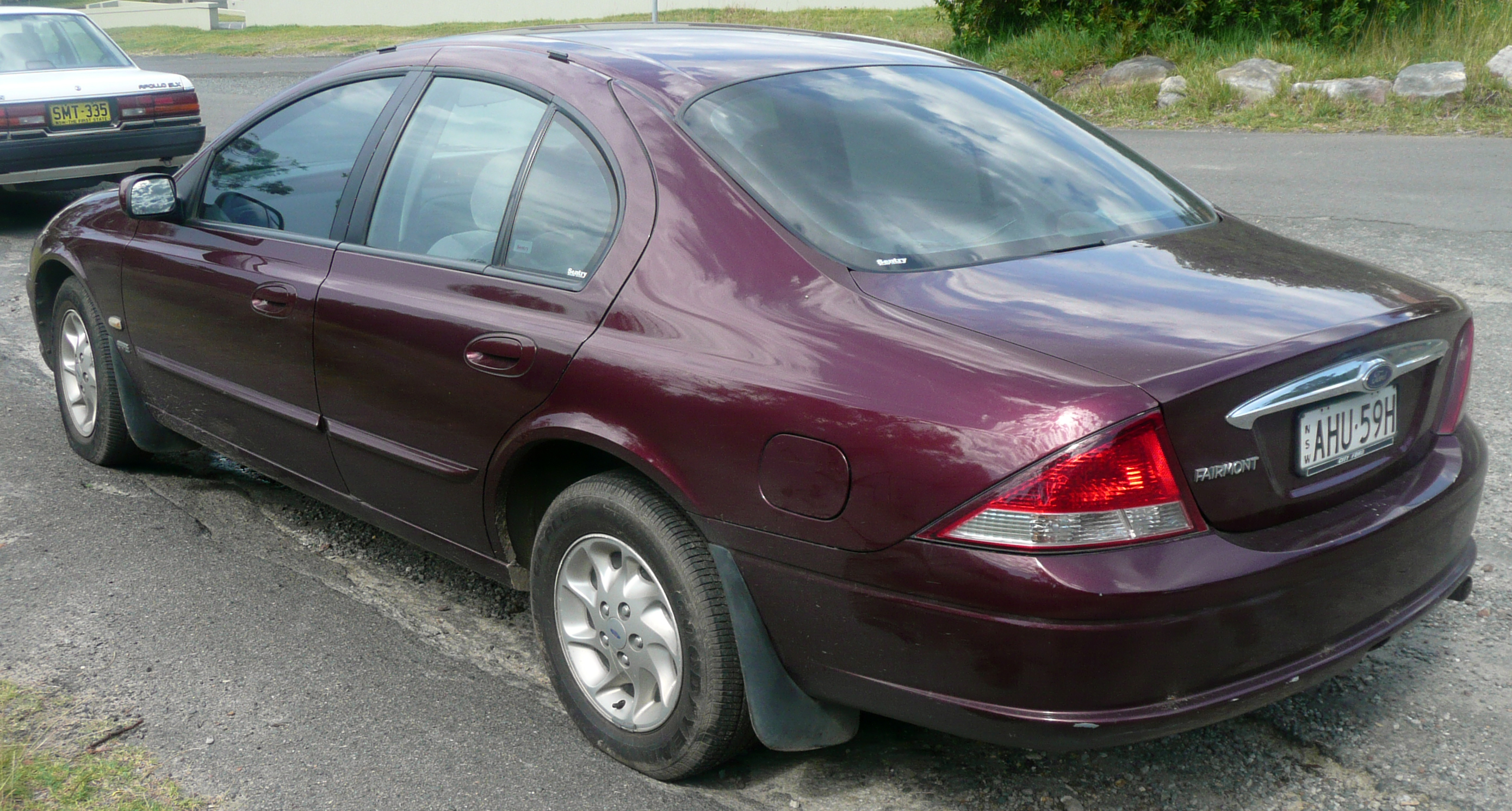
Fairmont

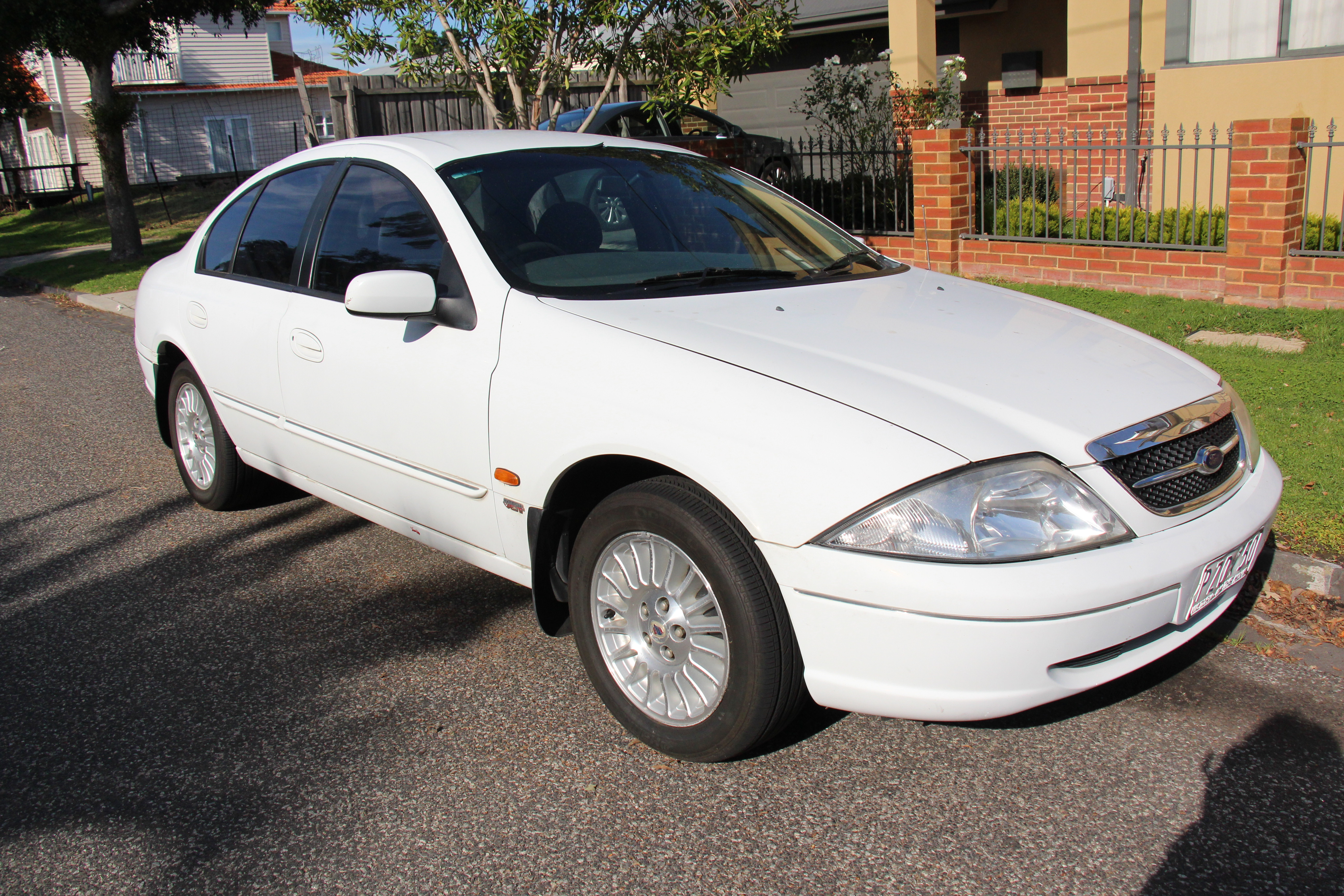
Fairmont Ghia

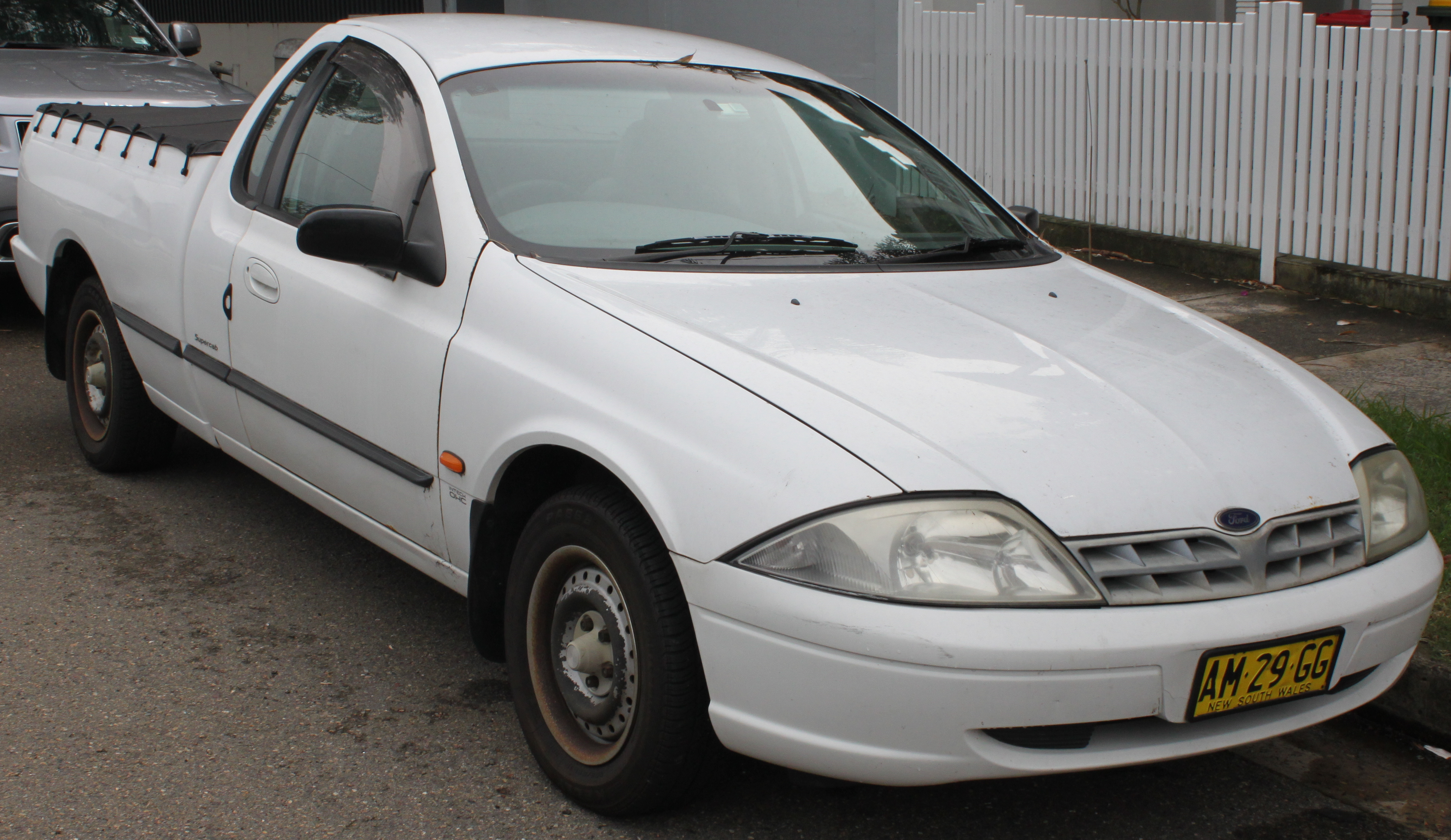
Falcon XL utility

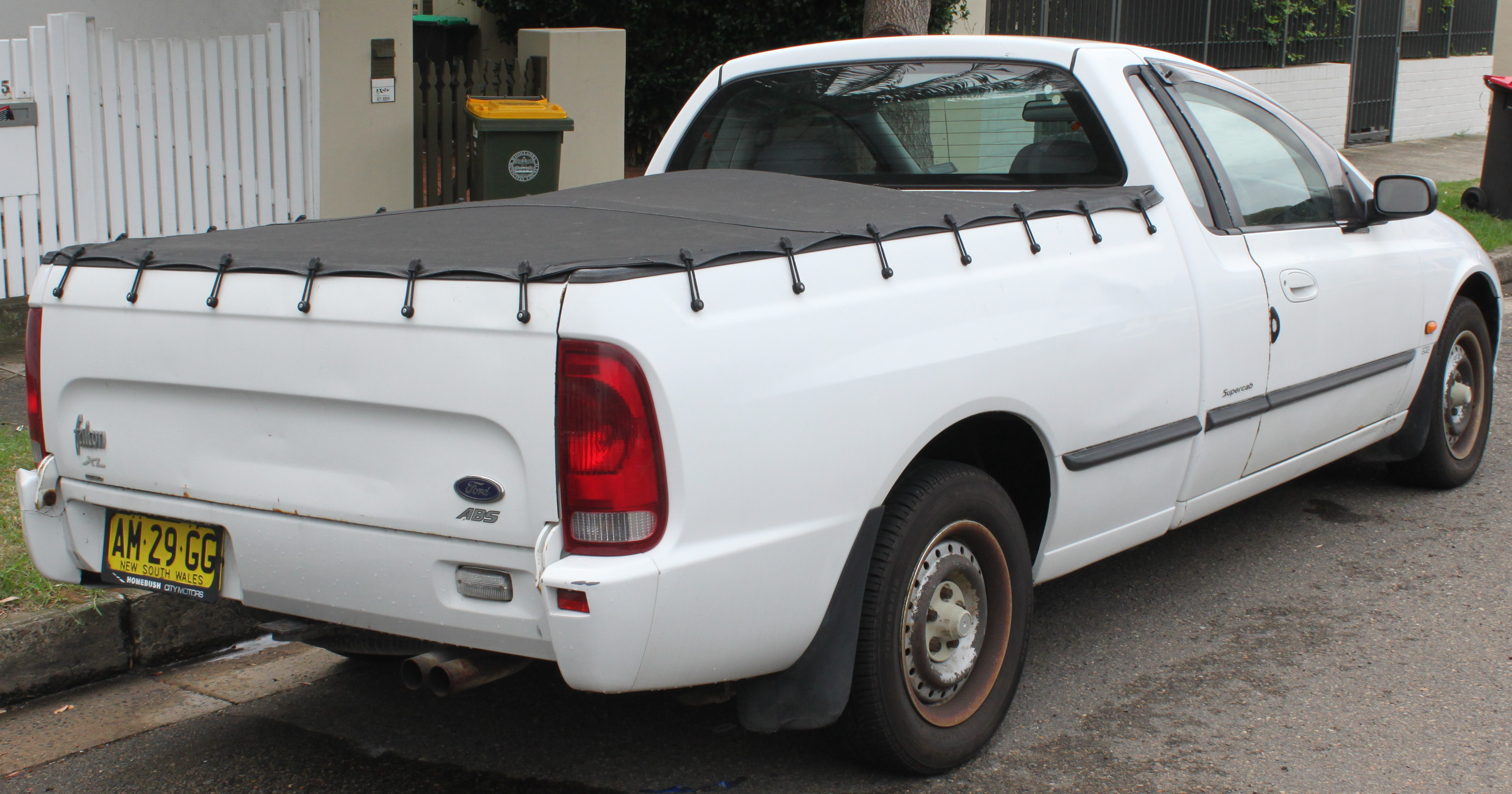
Falcon XL utility

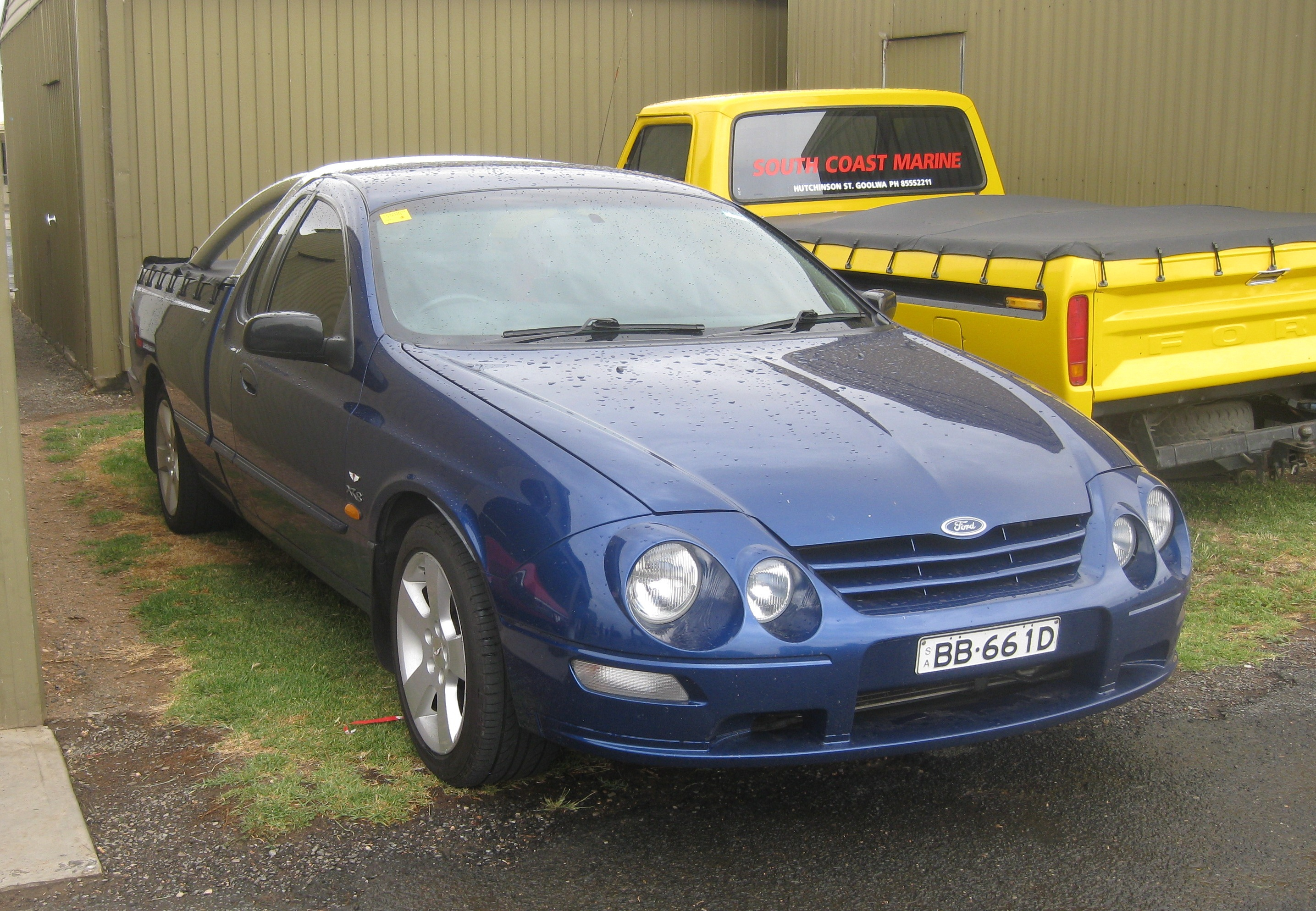
Falcon XR8 utility

=== Series II (AU II) ===
Many of these issues were addressed with the AU Series II (April 2000). They included:

- the "high series" raised bonnet from the Fairmont models
- a more conventional and common front grille for the volume Forté and Futura range
- increase depth and width for the rear bumper
- a laminated firewall, increased under-carpet asphalting and rubberised engine mounts to reduce NVH
- upgraded braking system (as detailed below)
- 16" wheels (in lieu of the previous 15 due to the larger twin-piston calipers)
- lowered ground clearance with new shock absorbers and ball-joints
- higher quality interior plastics (e.g. less oval central dashboard pod with silver highlights)
- standard cloth (in lieu of vinyl finishes) and darker "warm charcoal" interiors
- upraded sound systems
- upgraded SmartShield security system with a transponder located in the key (in lieu of the previous SmartLock that could not prevent thefts with copied keys)
- standard front airbag across the range.
- White turn signal lenses to replace the amber on the series I

Body strength increases, aimed at improving occupant safety and the Falcon's rating in the independent ANCAP crash test program, were also achieved. In the said tests, it received a three star adult occupant protection rating with a score of 24.2 and in the offset crash test, it was found that there was a low risk of injury to all bodily regions (including the driver's foot and lower leg due to excessive brake pedal movement). New safety features included an airbag and seatbelt pretensioners and load limiters on the front seats across the range. Wagons were fitted with a three-point lap-sash rear centre seatbelt, with the retractor integrated into the seat back.

The braking system now featured thicker front and rear discs, twin-piston aluminium-headed front calipers, bigger non-asbestos brake pads, larger master cylinder and a higher capacity booster. The discs were now ventilated 287x28 mm at the front and solid 287x16 mm at the back. The XR6 VCT and XR8 were also available with an optional Tickford Premium Brake setup that brought 329 mm grooved front brake discs with twin-piston C4 calipers.

Additional features included the introduction of a 100 watt stereo with single-slot CD player, variable intermittent wipers and door lock/unlock button on the instrument panel and the equipment upgrade (such as standard air conditioning, front power windows and automatic transmission) on the entry Forté model, to shrug off initial impressions the low budget perception associated with the first AU series. Also across the range, Ford now offered 3-years or 60,000 km worth of scheduled servicing included in the purchase price.

The standard series II range included:

- Falcon Forté, 4.0 L, "Intech" I6, Sedan/Wagon, 157 kW (211 hp), 357 N⋅m (263 lb⋅ft)
- Falcon Forté, 5.0 L, "Windsor" V8, Sedan, 175 kW (235 hp), 395 N⋅m (291 lb⋅ft)
- Falcon S, 4.0 L, "Intech" I6, Sedan, 157 kW (211 hp), 357 N⋅m (263 lb⋅ft)
- Futura, 4.0 L, "Intech" I6, Sedan/Wagon, 157 kW (211 hp), 357 N⋅m (263 lb⋅ft)
- Fairmont, 4.0 L, "Intech" I6, Sedan/Wagon, 157 kW (211 hp), 357 N⋅m (263 lb⋅ft)
- Falcon XR6, 4.0 L, "Intech" I6, Sedan, 164 kW (220 hp), 366 N⋅m (270 lb⋅ft)
- Falcon XR6 VCT, 4.0 L, "Intech VCT" I6, Sedan, 172 kW (231 hp), 374 N⋅m (276 lb⋅ft)
- Falcon XR8, 5.0 L, "Windsor" V8, Sedan, 200 kW (270 hp), 420 N⋅m (310 lb⋅ft) (to April 2001)
- Falcon XR8, Handbuilt 5.0 L, "Windsor" V8, Sedan, 220 kW (300 hp), 435 N⋅m (321 lb⋅ft) (from May 2001)
- Fairmont Ghia, 4.0 L, "Intech VCT" I6, Sedan, 168 kW (225 hp), 370 N⋅m (270 lb⋅ft)
- Fairmont Ghia, 5.0 L, "Windsor" V8, Sedan, 175 kW (235 hp), 395 N⋅m (291 lb⋅ft)

As listed above, the engine range remained largely the same initially, except for increased output for the XR8 and the introduction, from July 2000, of a dedicated LPG engine, marketed as the "Intech E-Gas". It had a single-point, venturi-style carburetor rather than sequential injection as per the petrol engines. Other differences included: different spark plugs, inductive high tension leads and a unique engine management processor. The sedans were fitted with a 92-litre LPG cylinder, while wagons had 115-litre cylinders.

Sedan-based limited editions included the: X-Pack (a Forté upgrade with a choice of two ROH alloy wheel designs from the Ford accessory line as standard and original XR rear wing), SR (Forté-based S successor now with ABS), Futura Classic, Futura & Fairmont Ghia 75th Anniversary sedans (to commemorate Ford Australia's birth in 1925), XR8 Rebel (featuring a limited edition Ford Racing bodykit, 18-inch wheels, MOMO steering wheel and gear shift and a Sony PlayStation 2 with Grand Turismo III).

Augmenting the X-Pack, in late 2000 Stillwell Ford dealers in South Australia launched a Sportryder variant, which added an upgraded and lowered sport suspension using Pedders components plus locally sourced CSA alloy wheels for A$29,990.

The Falcon Utility Series II range included the XL, XLS, XR and XR8 with limited editions including (by respective base model): Tradesman (XL); Sports Edition and Marlin (XLS); Pursuit (XR).

The FTE T2 range comprised:

- TE50, 5.0 L, "Synergy 5000" V8, Sedan, 220 kW (300 hp), 435 N⋅m (321 lb⋅ft)
- TS50, 5.0 L, "Synergy 5000" V8, Sedan, 220 kW (300 hp), 435 N⋅m (321 lb⋅ft)
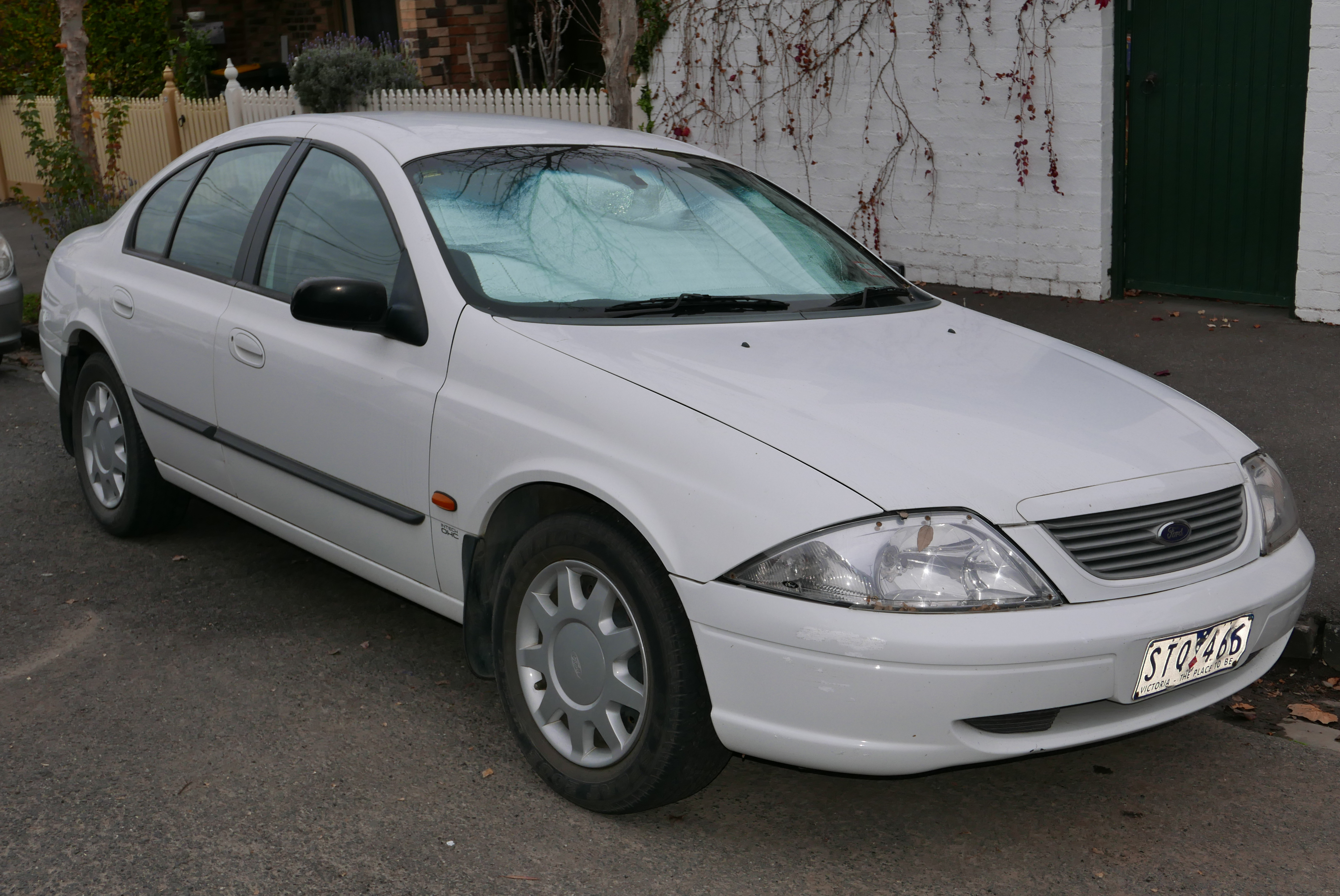
Falcon Forté (Series II)

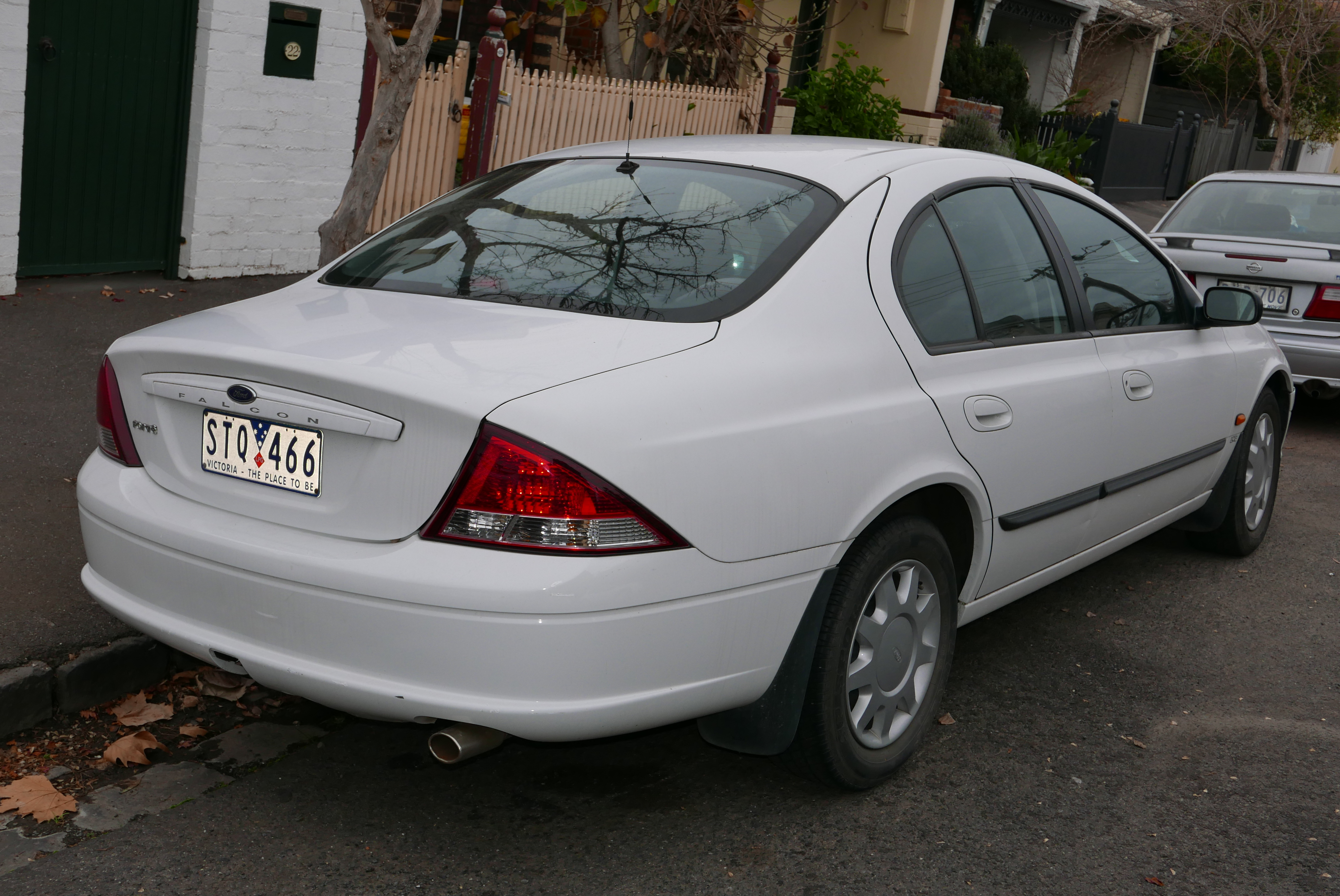
Falcon Forté (Series II)

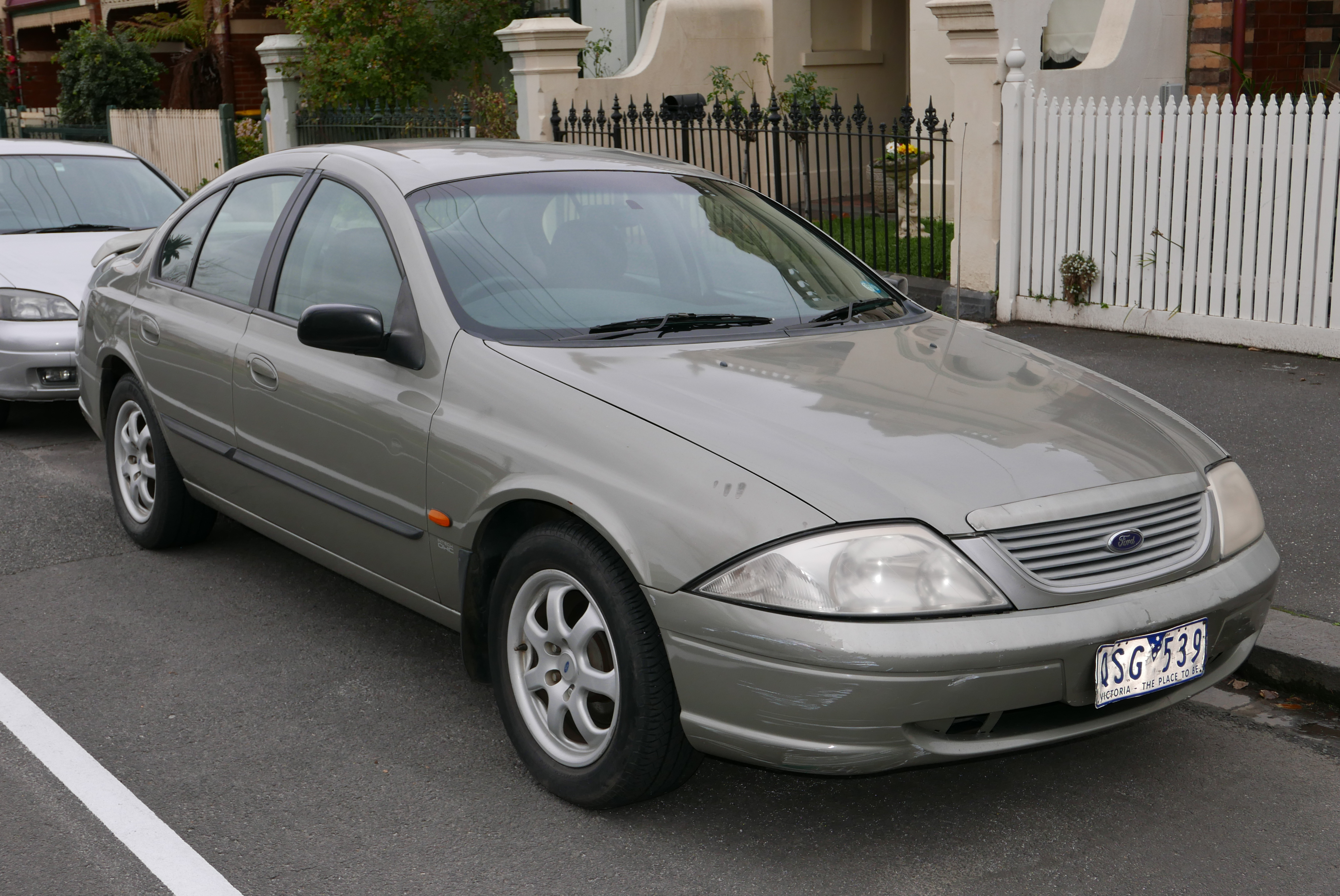
Forté X-Pack (Series II)

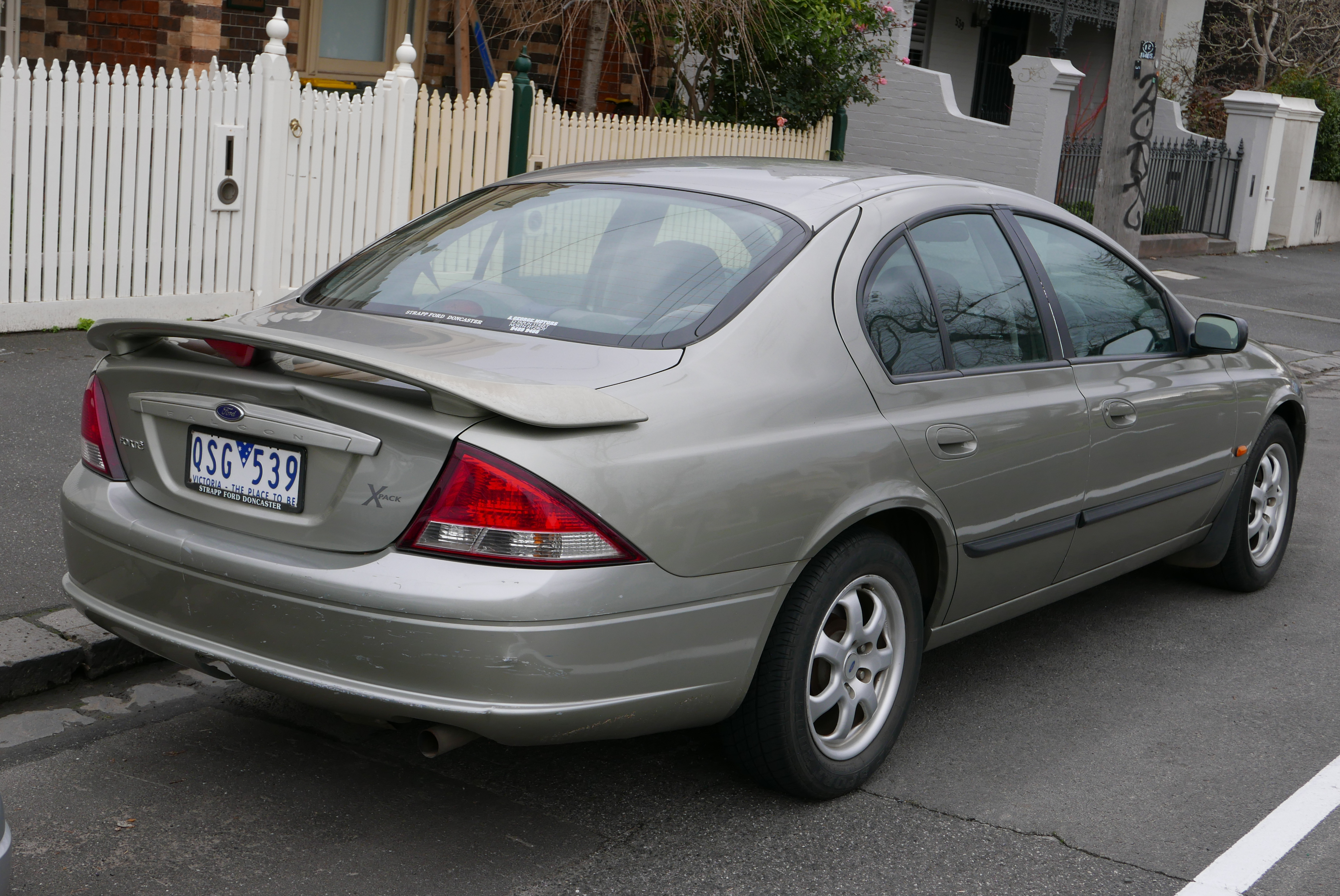
Forté X-Pack (Series II)

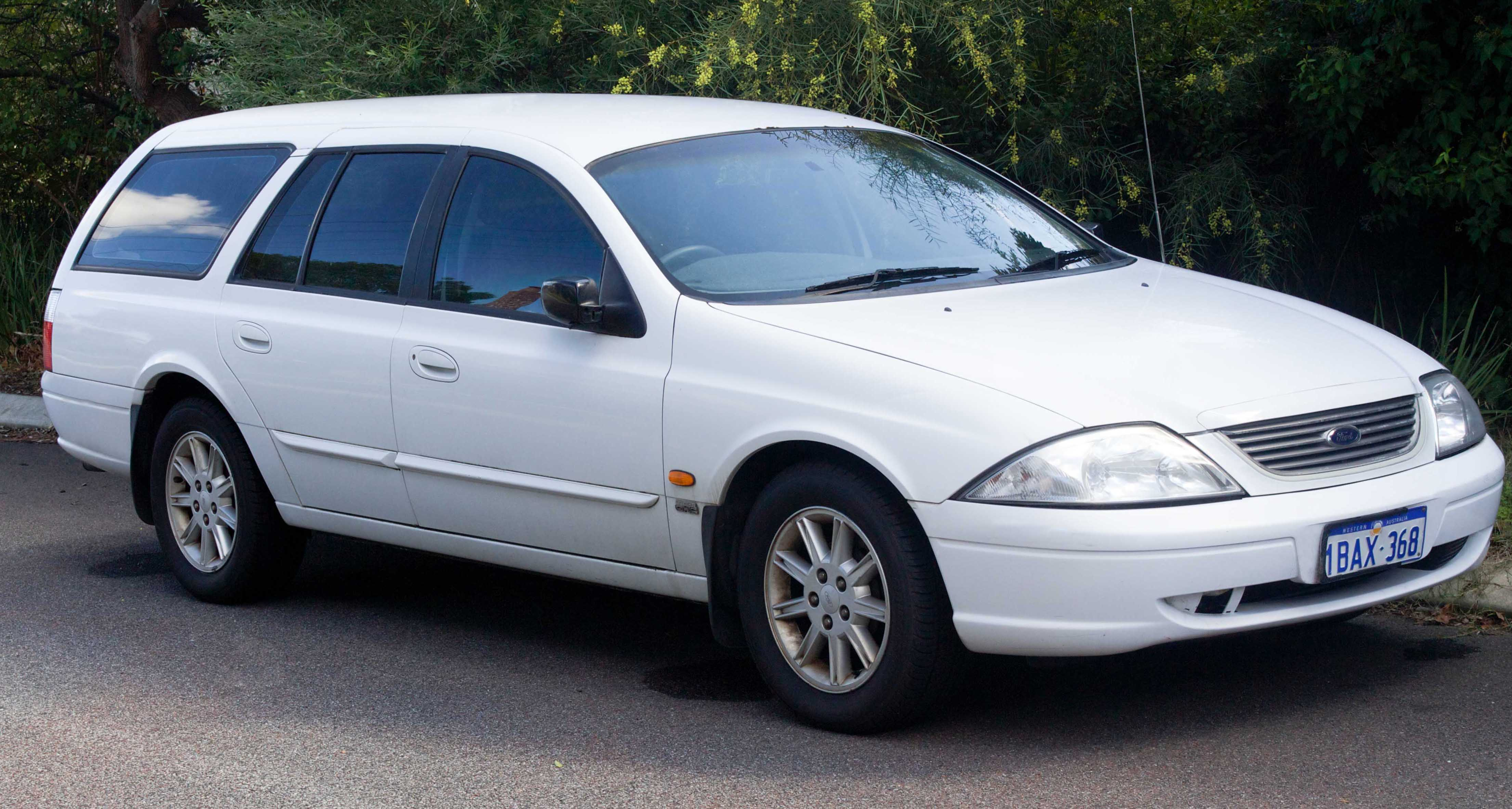
Futura wagon (Series II)

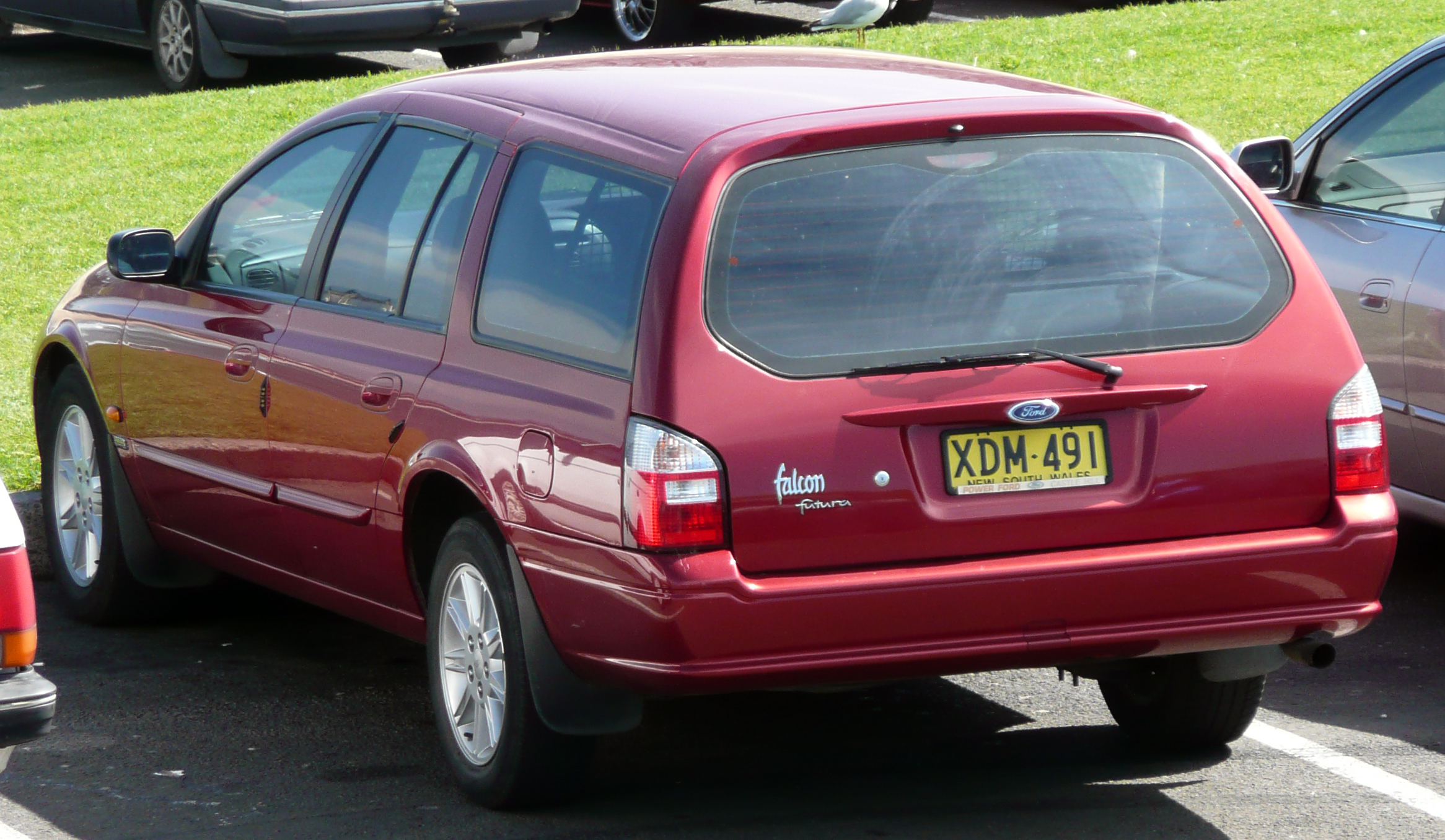
Futura wagon (Series II)

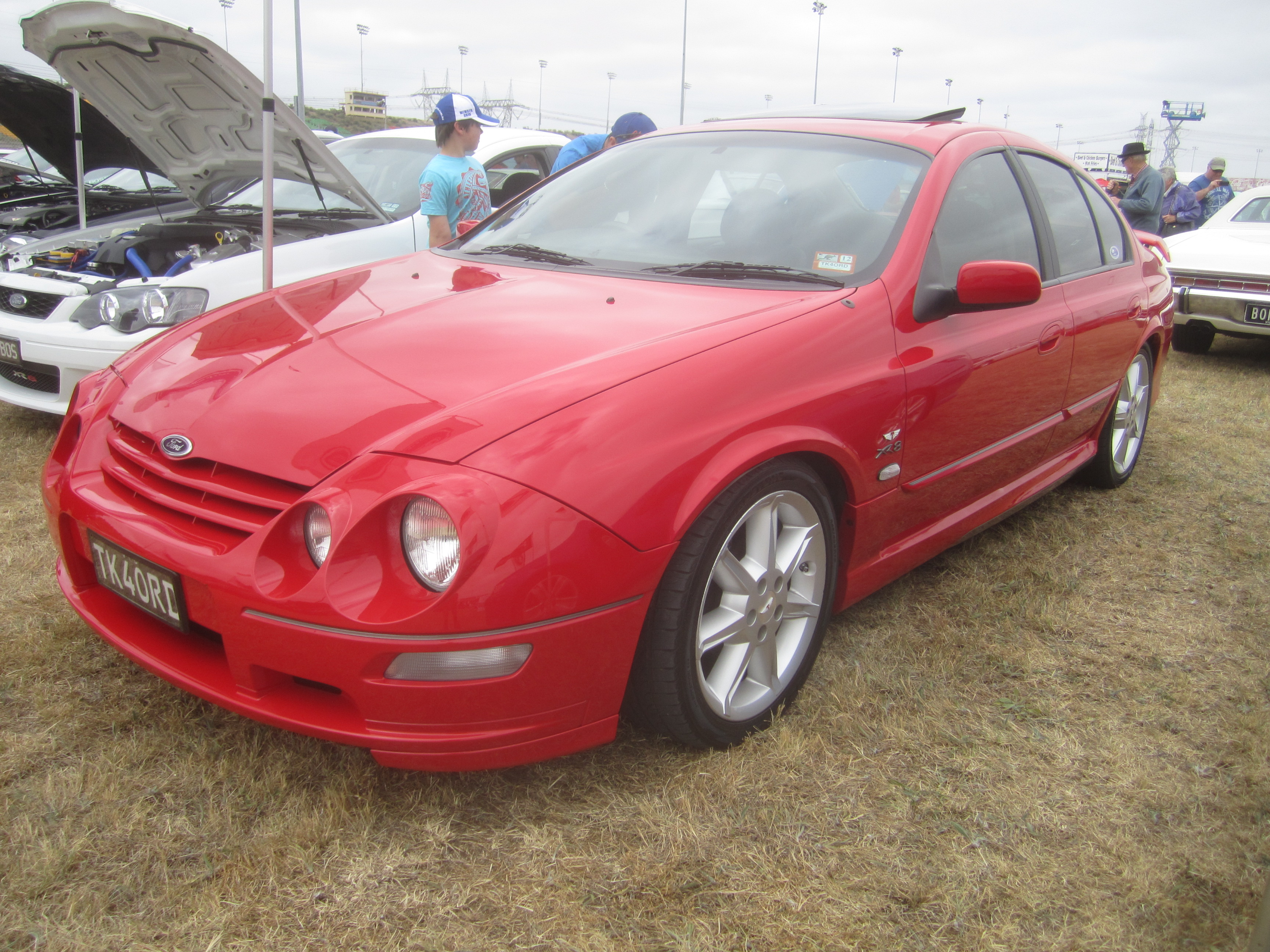
Falcon XR8 Rebel (Series II)

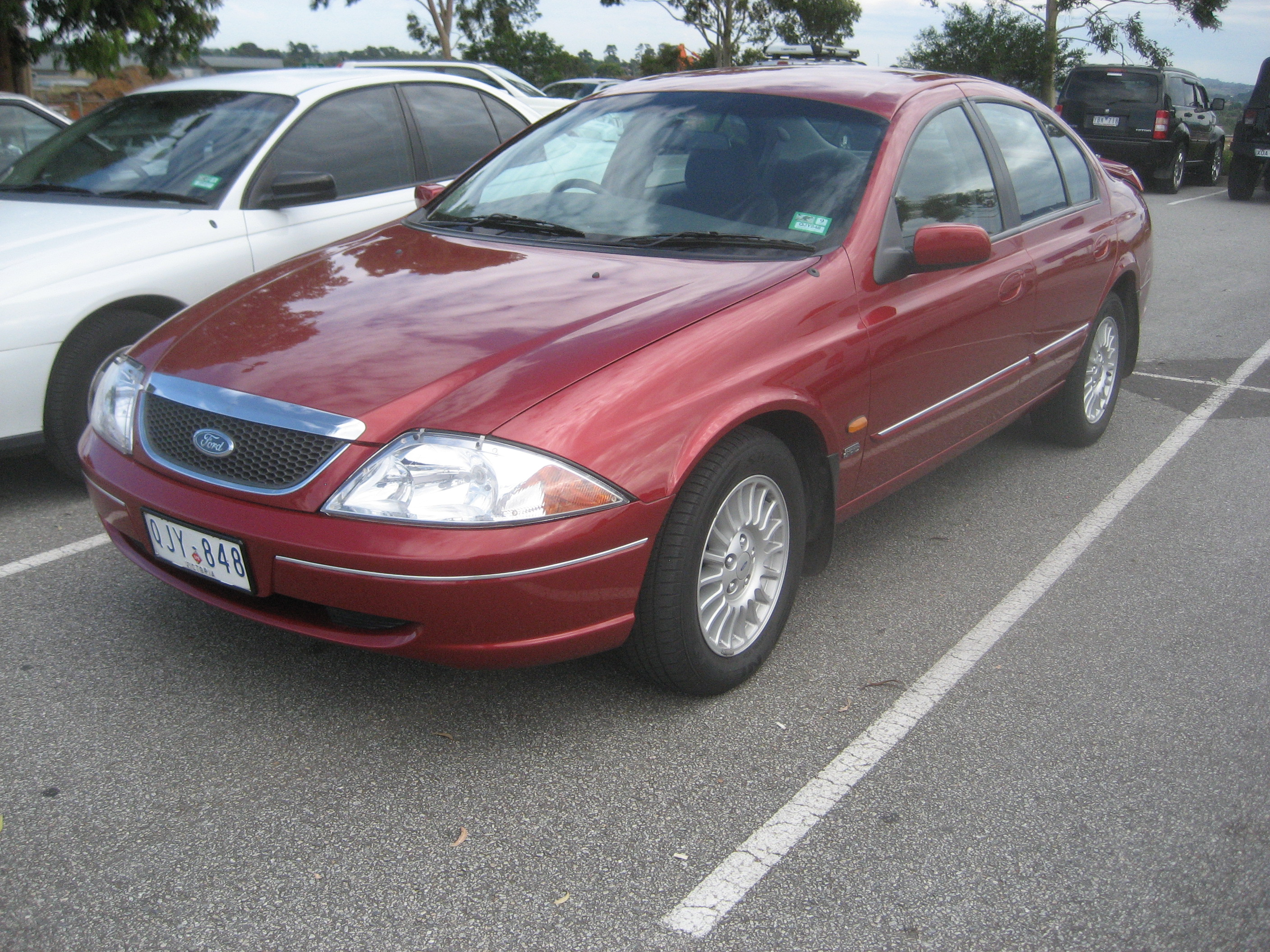
Fairmont (Series II)

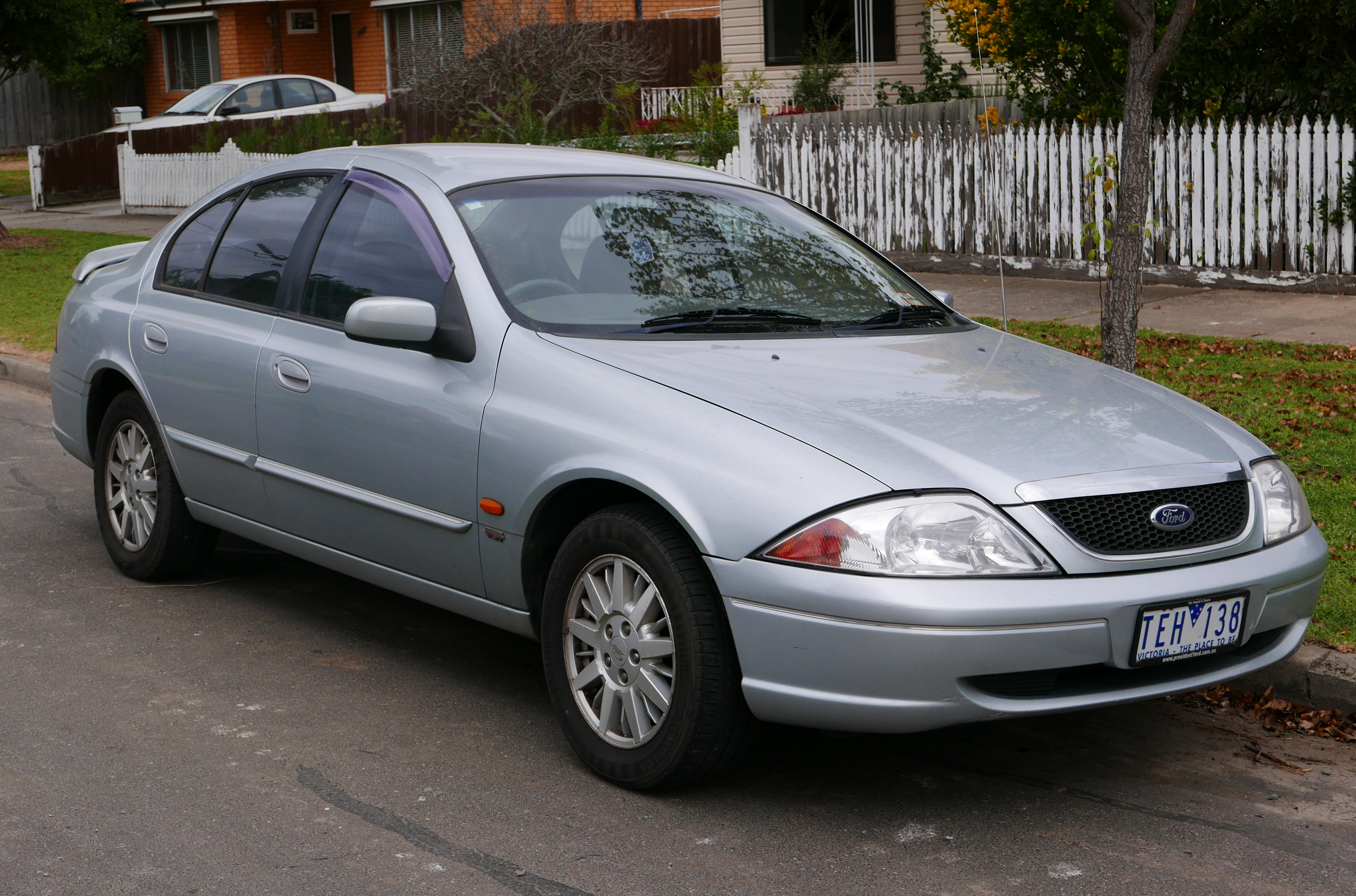
Fairmont Ghia (Series II)

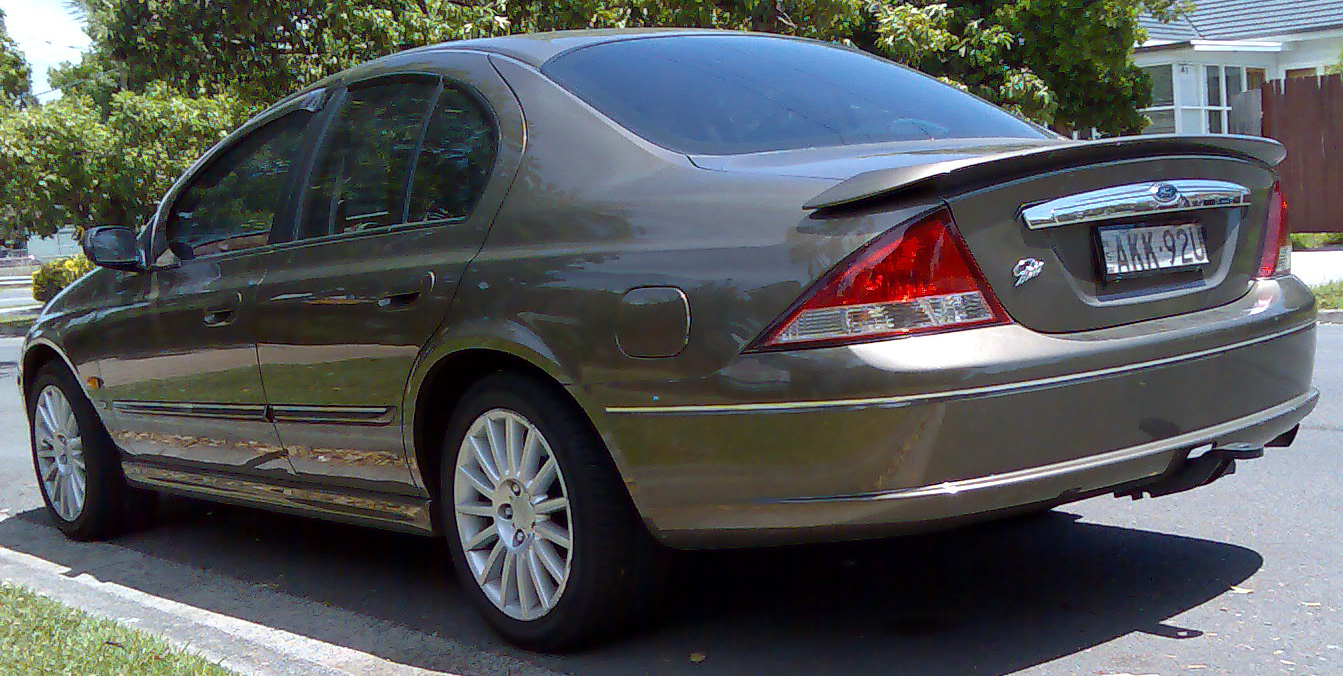
Fairmont Ghia 75th Anniversary (Series II)

=== Series III (AU III) ===
This final AU-based Falcon was presented at the Sydney Motorshow in November 2001, by surprise.

The Falcon's Series III range reflected that of the AU II, except for:

- the discontinuance of the Falcon S
- a limited edition Falcon XR6 VCT ST (with unique Ford Racing bodykit from the XR8 Rebel)
- a Falcon XR8 Pursuit 250 Utility by TVE (250 kW upgrade).

FTE additionally introduced more powerful T3 models as follows:

- TE50, 5.6 L, "Windsor" V8, Sedan, 249.8 kW (335.0 hp), 500 N⋅m (370 lb⋅ft)
- TS50, 5.6 L, "Windsor" V8, Sedan, 249.8 kW (335.0 hp), 500 N⋅m (370 lb⋅ft)

Externally, the Series III, featured body-coloured mirrors and side strips plus standard side skirts and different wheels on some models. Headlights became a shade darker, side indicators clear and a dot matrix windscreen was added to reduce sun glare. In terms of interiors, additional features were added as standard: Futura – rear power windows and velour trim; Fairmont – 6-way power-adjustable driver's seat; Fairmont Ghia – 10-way power-adjustable driver's seat and leather trim. Though ABS became standard across the range, the XR models lost equipment: XR6 – limited-slip differential (LSD) now optional; all XR's – stereo downgrade to a 4-speaker single-CD unit. A bodykit marketed as "Havoc" (with new front and rear bumpers featuring stainless mesh inserts; fog lights; side skirts and an optional rear spoiler) became optional on all Falcons with XR8 buyers also having the choice of a Tickford bodykit or the Ford Racing bodykit (originally featured on the AU II Falcon XR8 Rebel). Fairmont and XR could also optioned with the "REX" (Rear Entertainment XTreme) package, allowing rear passenger to play DVD movies or connect game consoles.

The combined production of Falcon Series II and III to September 2002 totaled 237,701 units.

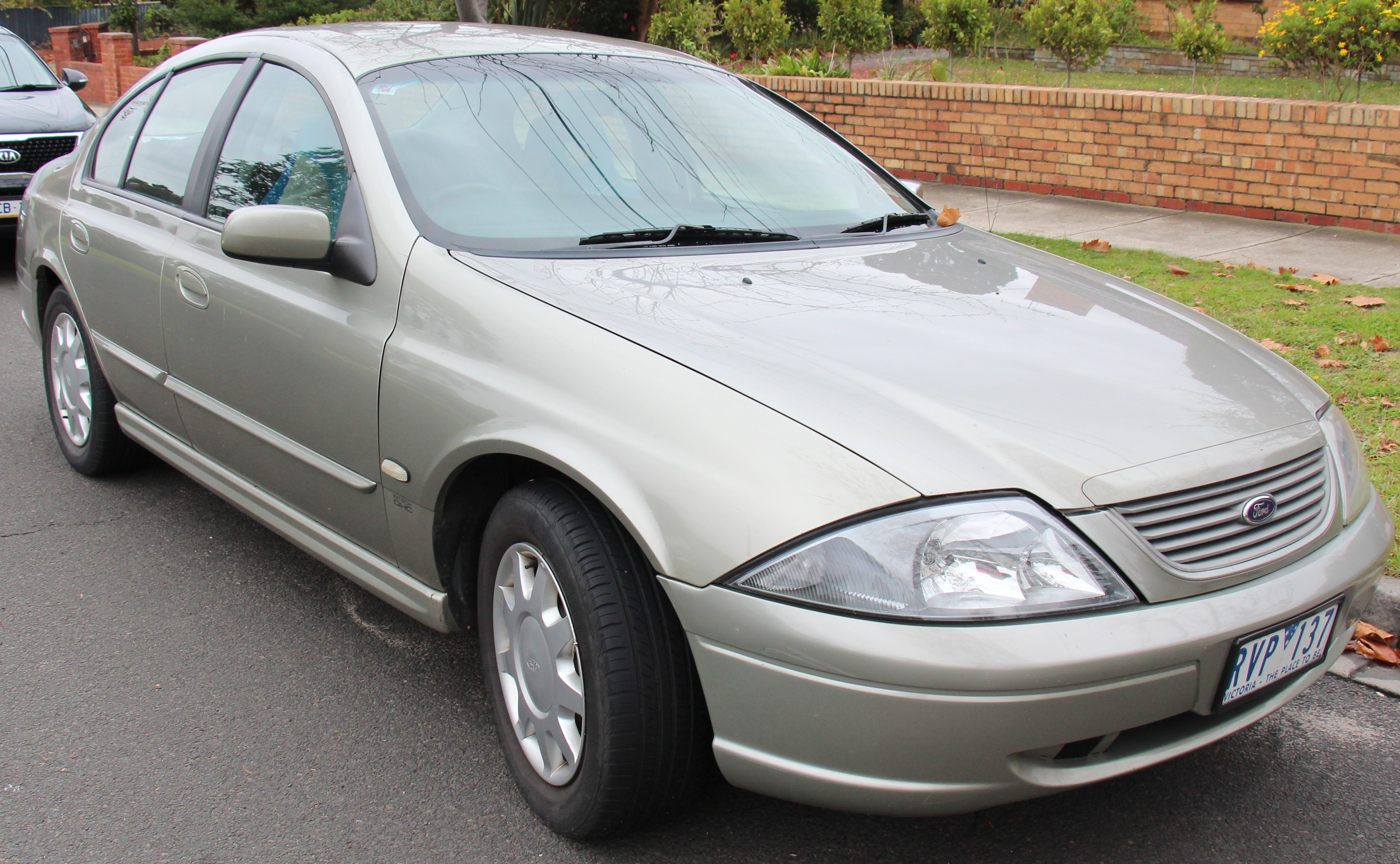
Falcon Forté sedan (Series III)

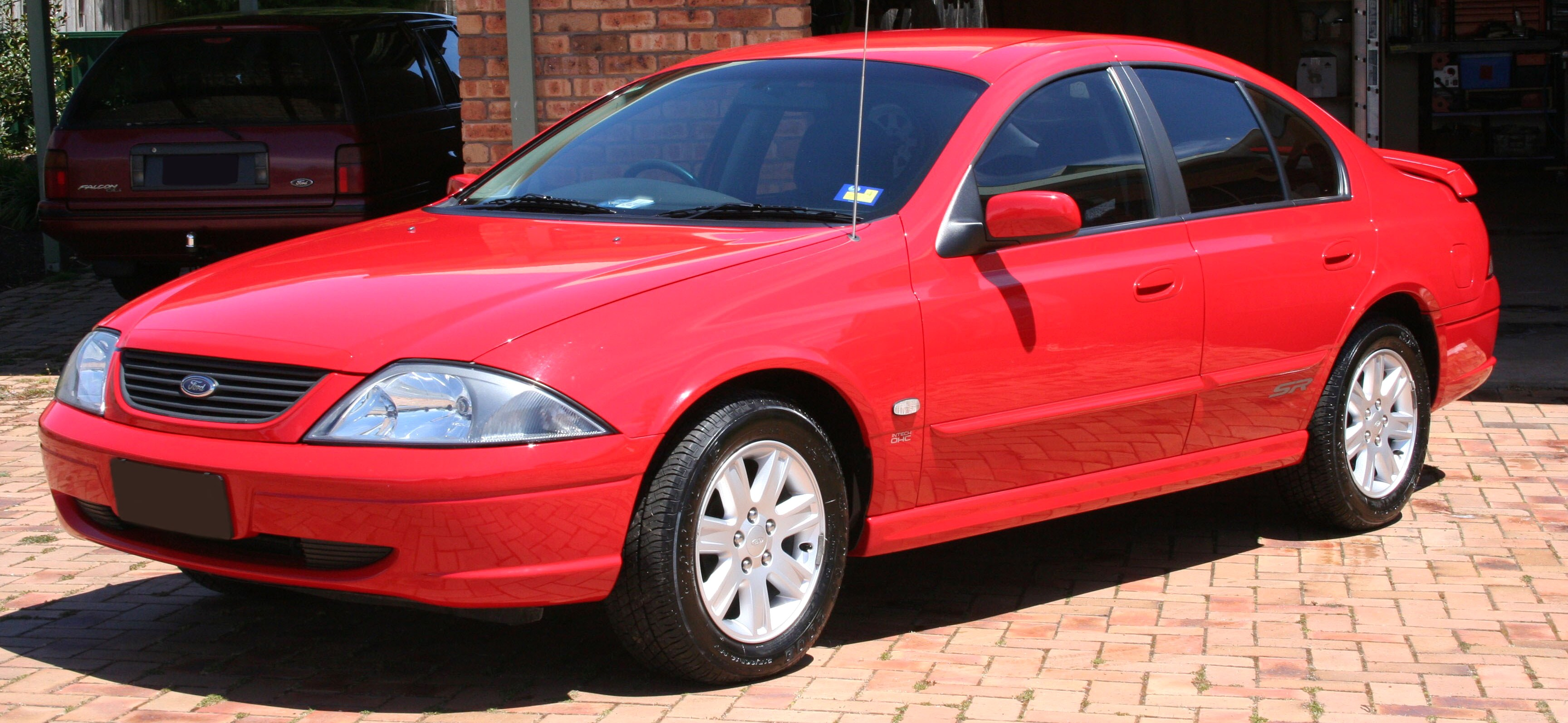
Falcon SR sedan (Series III)

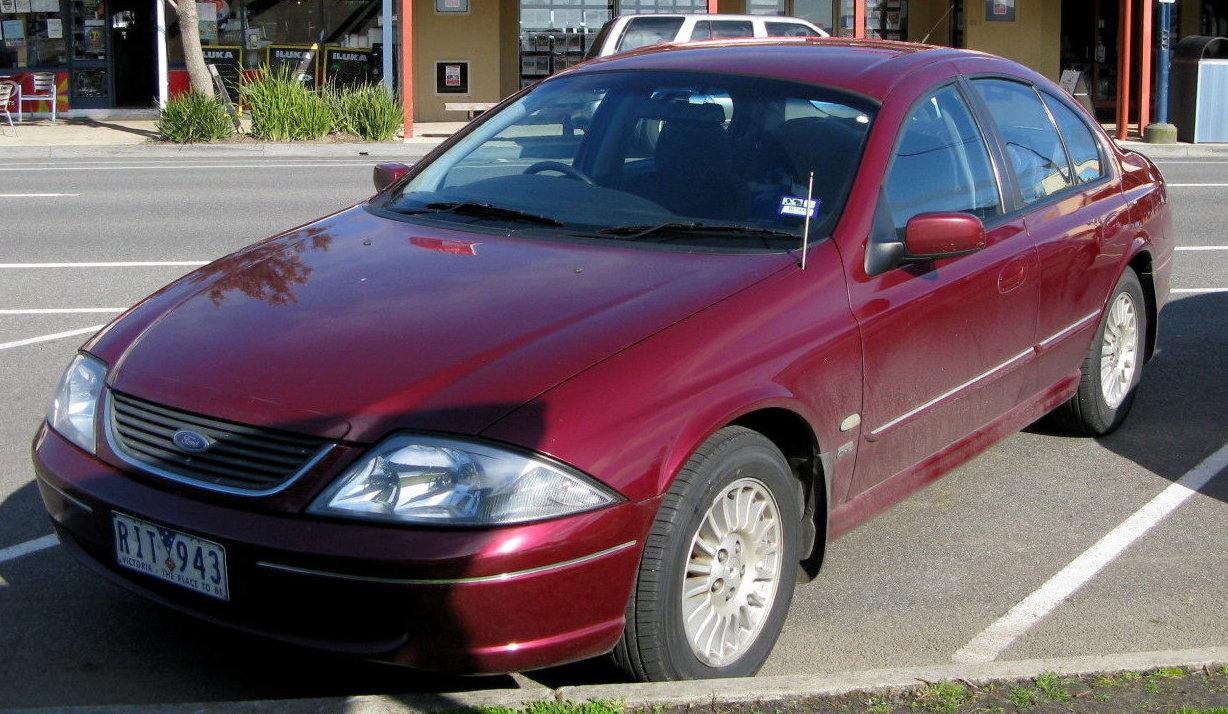
Futura sedan (Series III)

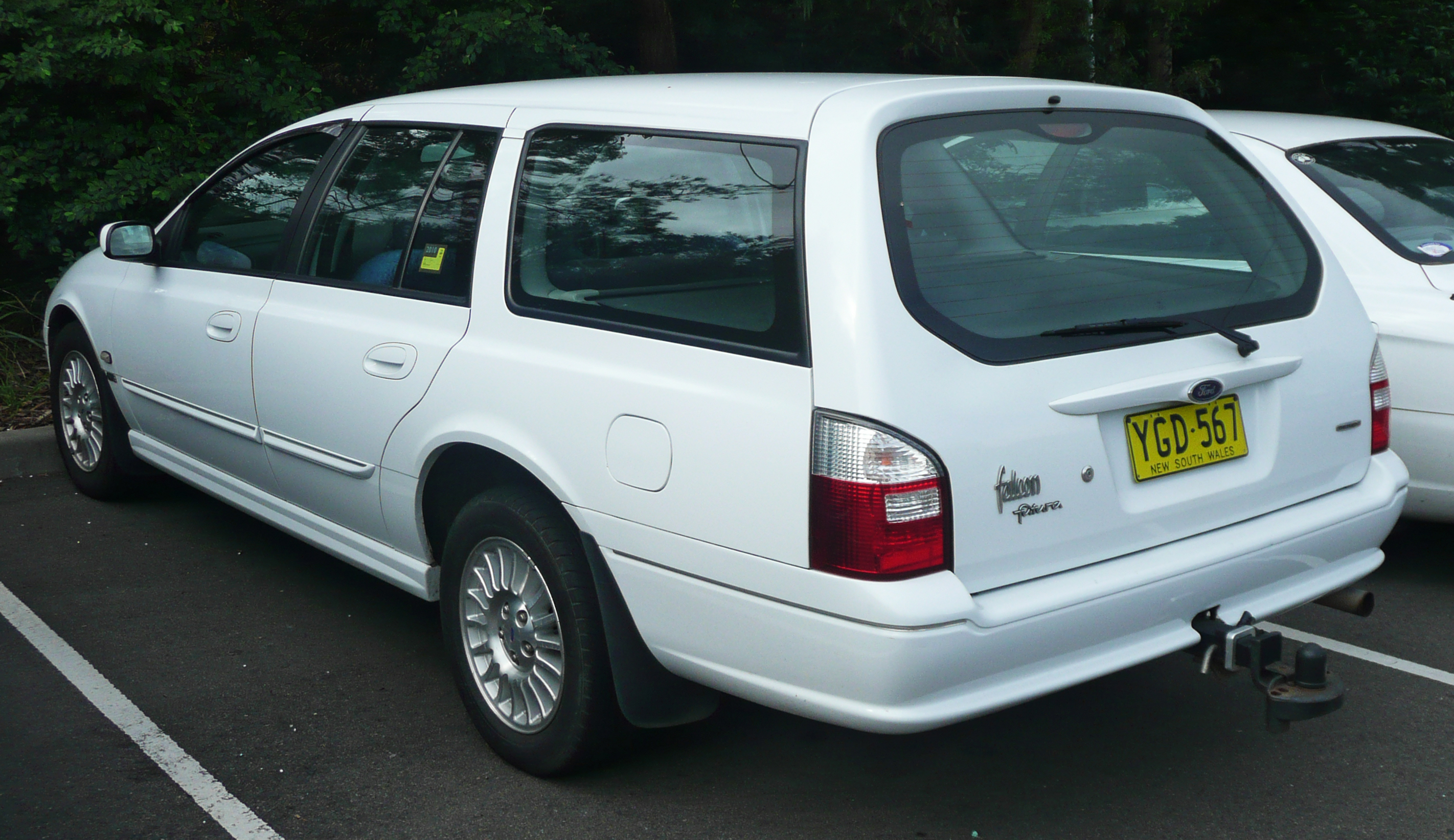
Futura wagon (Series III)

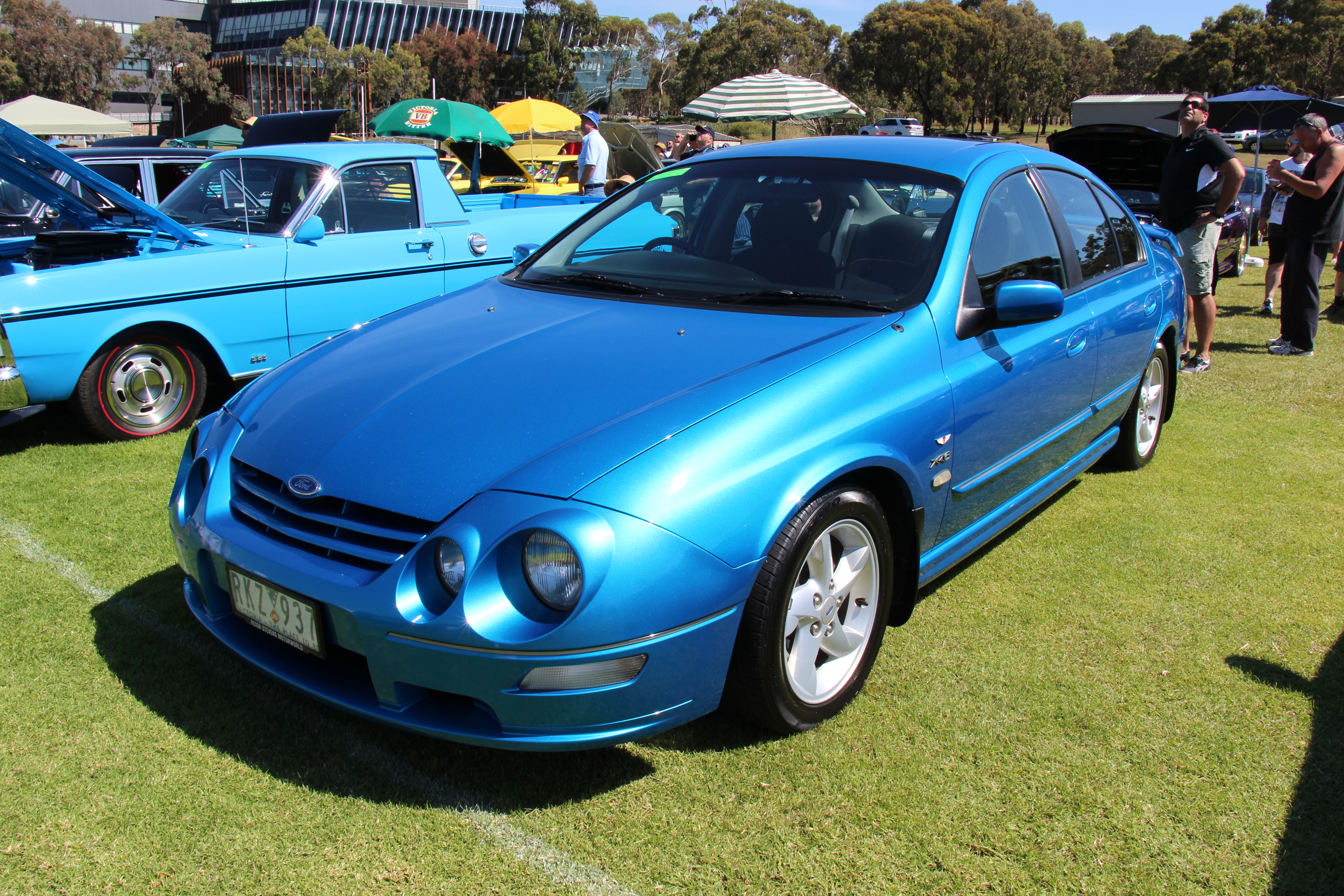
Falcon XR6 sedan (Series III)

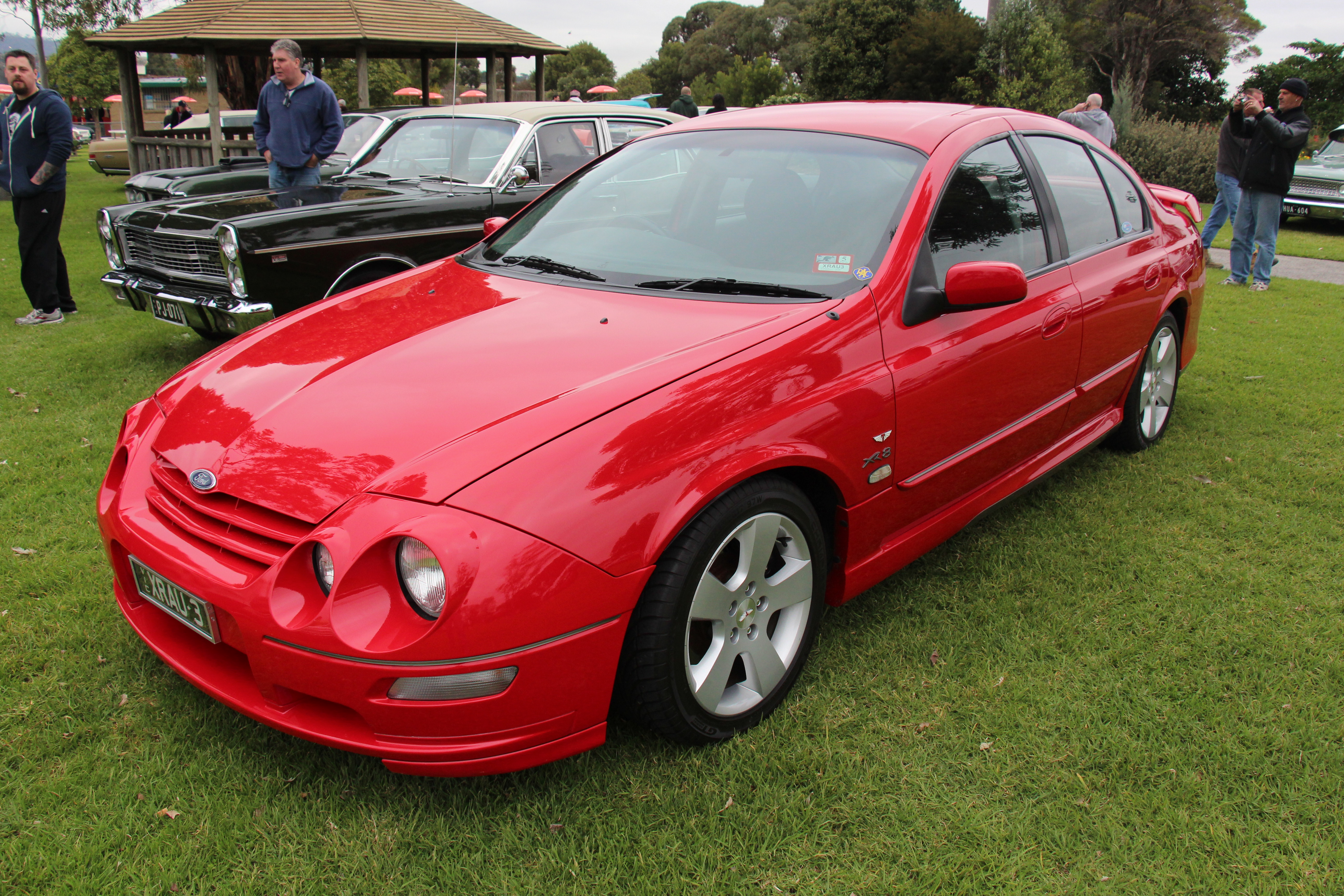
Falcon XR8 sedan (Series III)

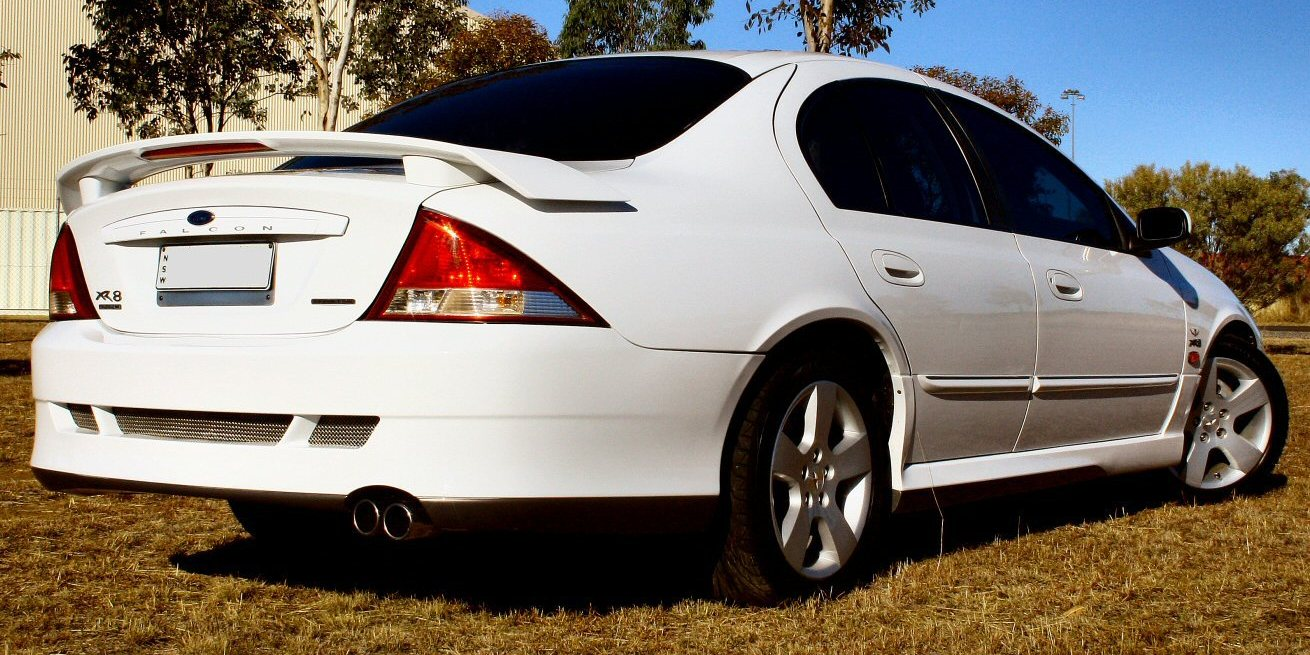
Falcon XR8 (Series III)

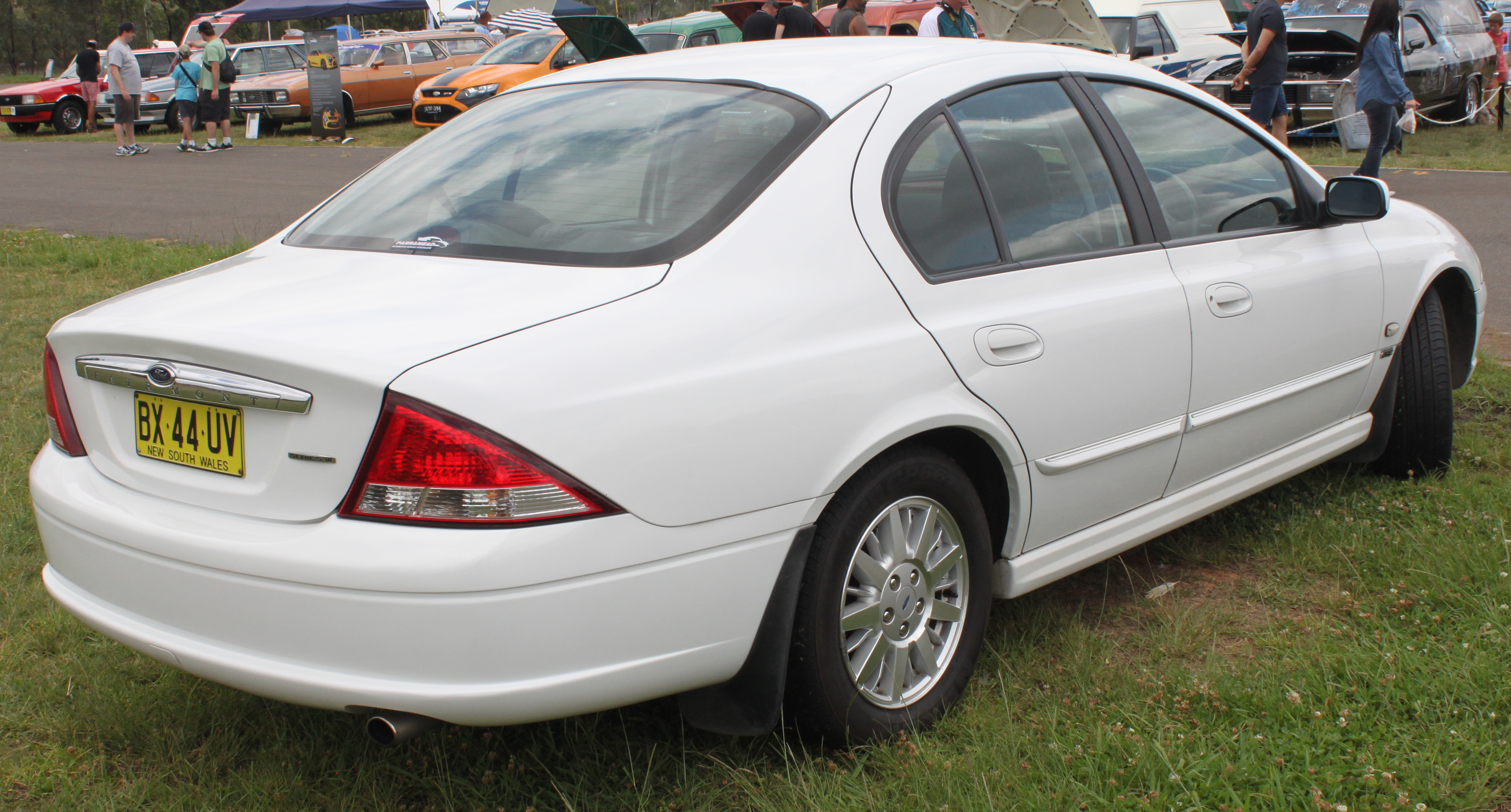
Fairmont sedan (Series III)

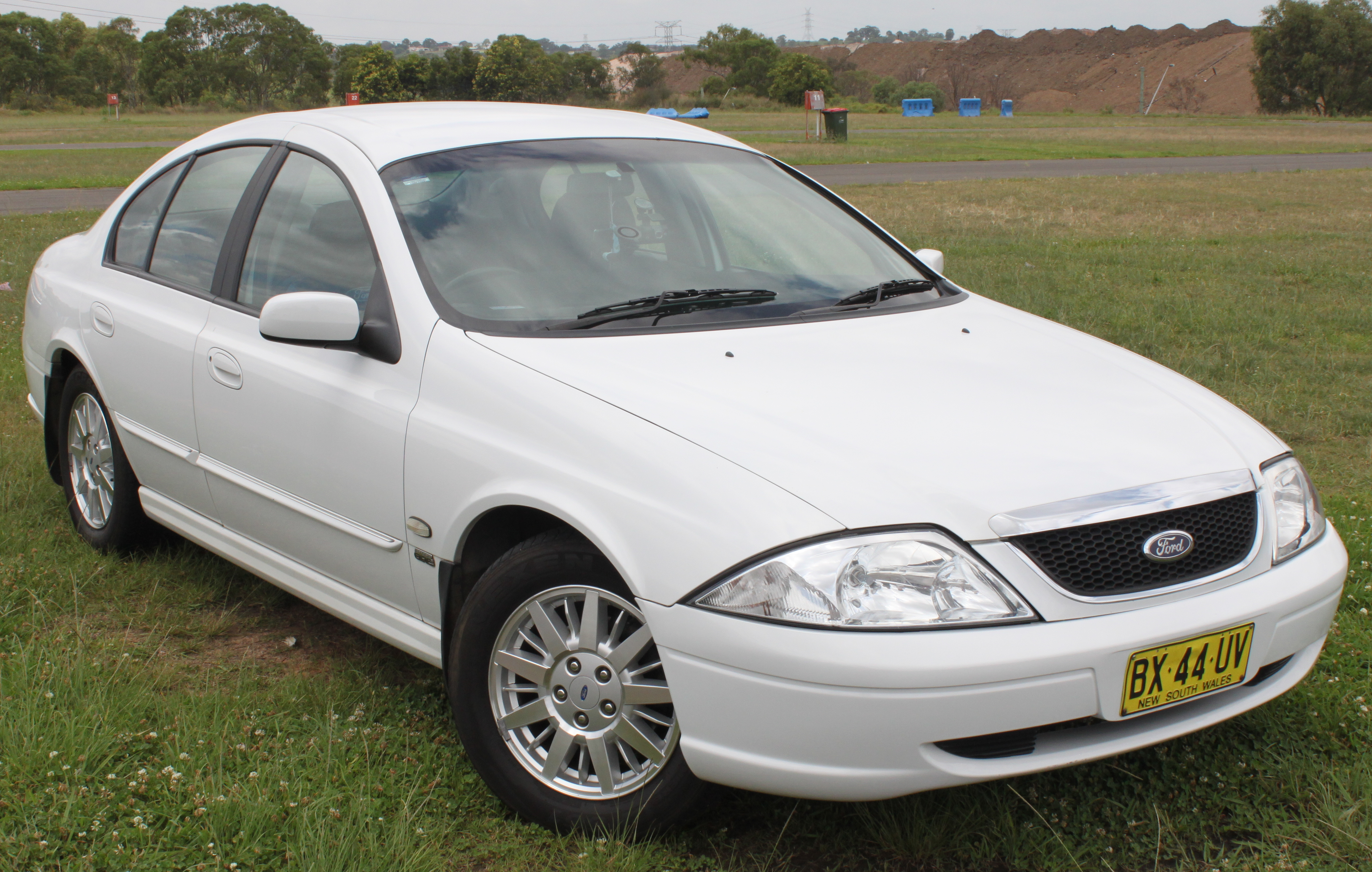
Fairmont sedan (Series III)

== Derivatives ==
=== FTE T series ===
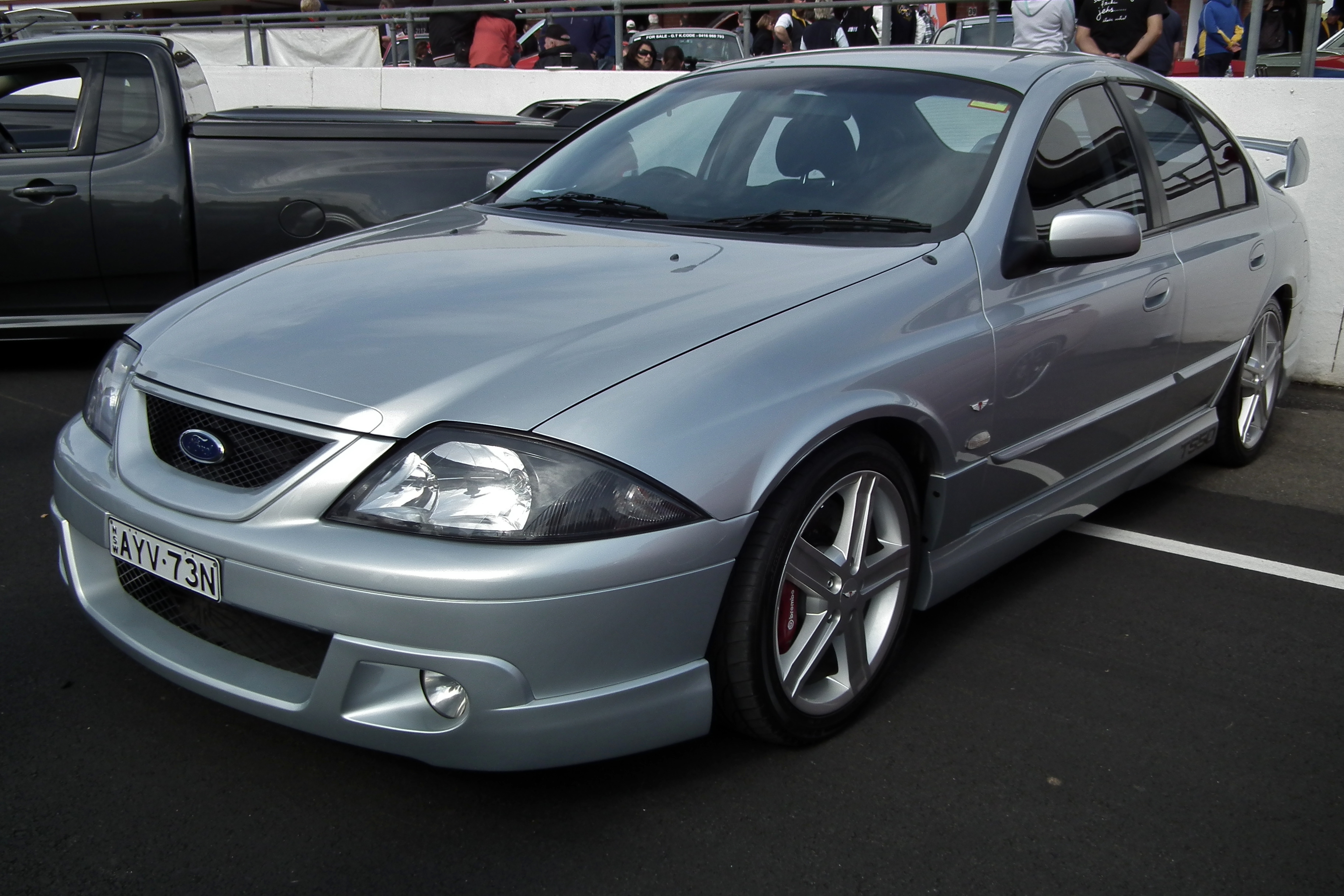
FTE TS50 (T3)

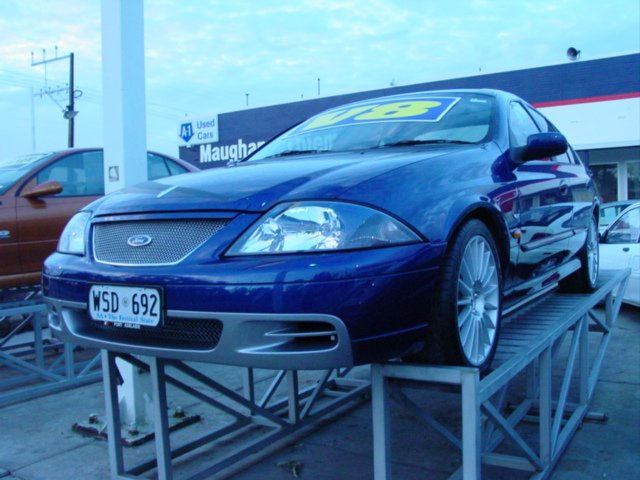
FTE TE50 (T2)

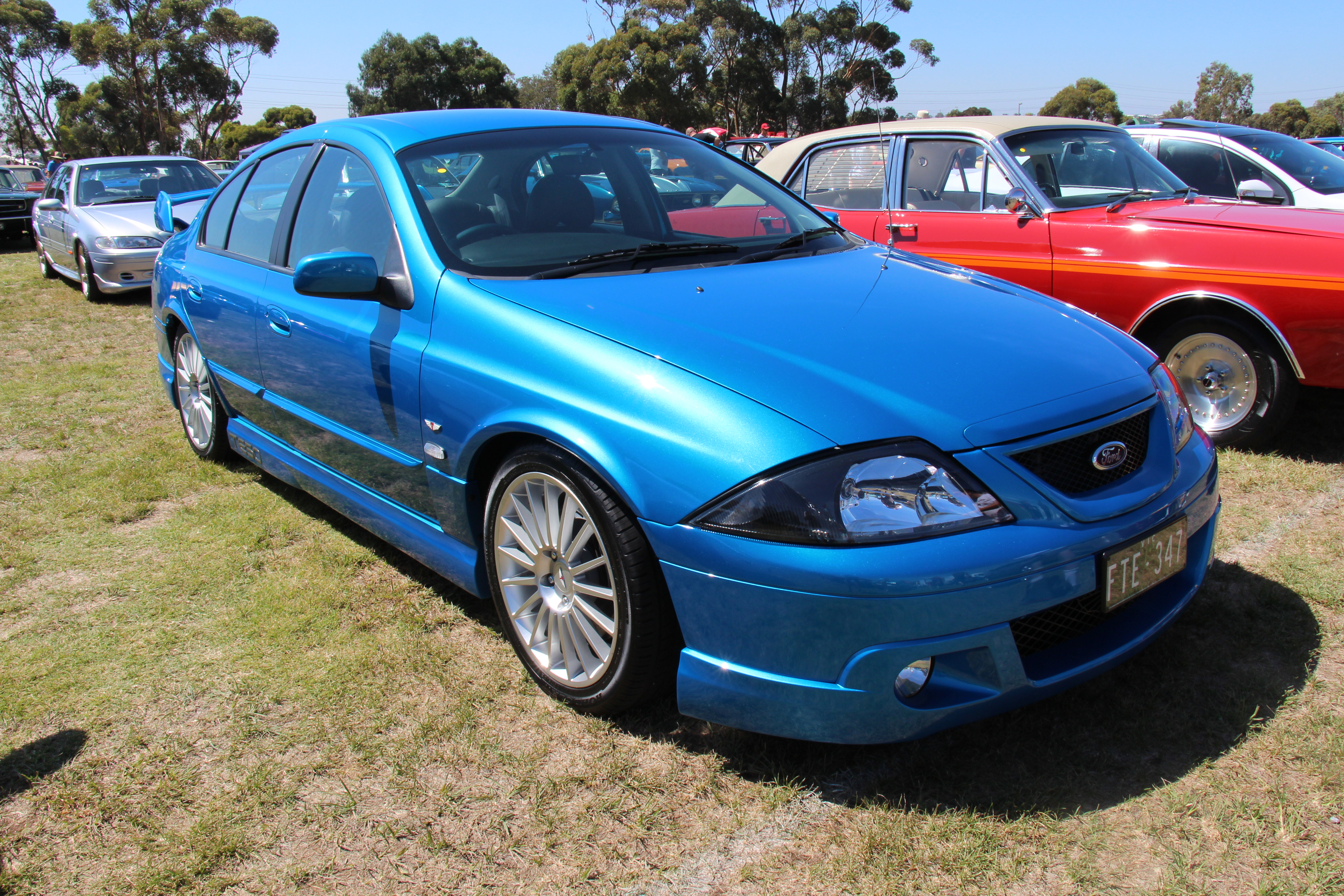
FTE TS50 (T3)

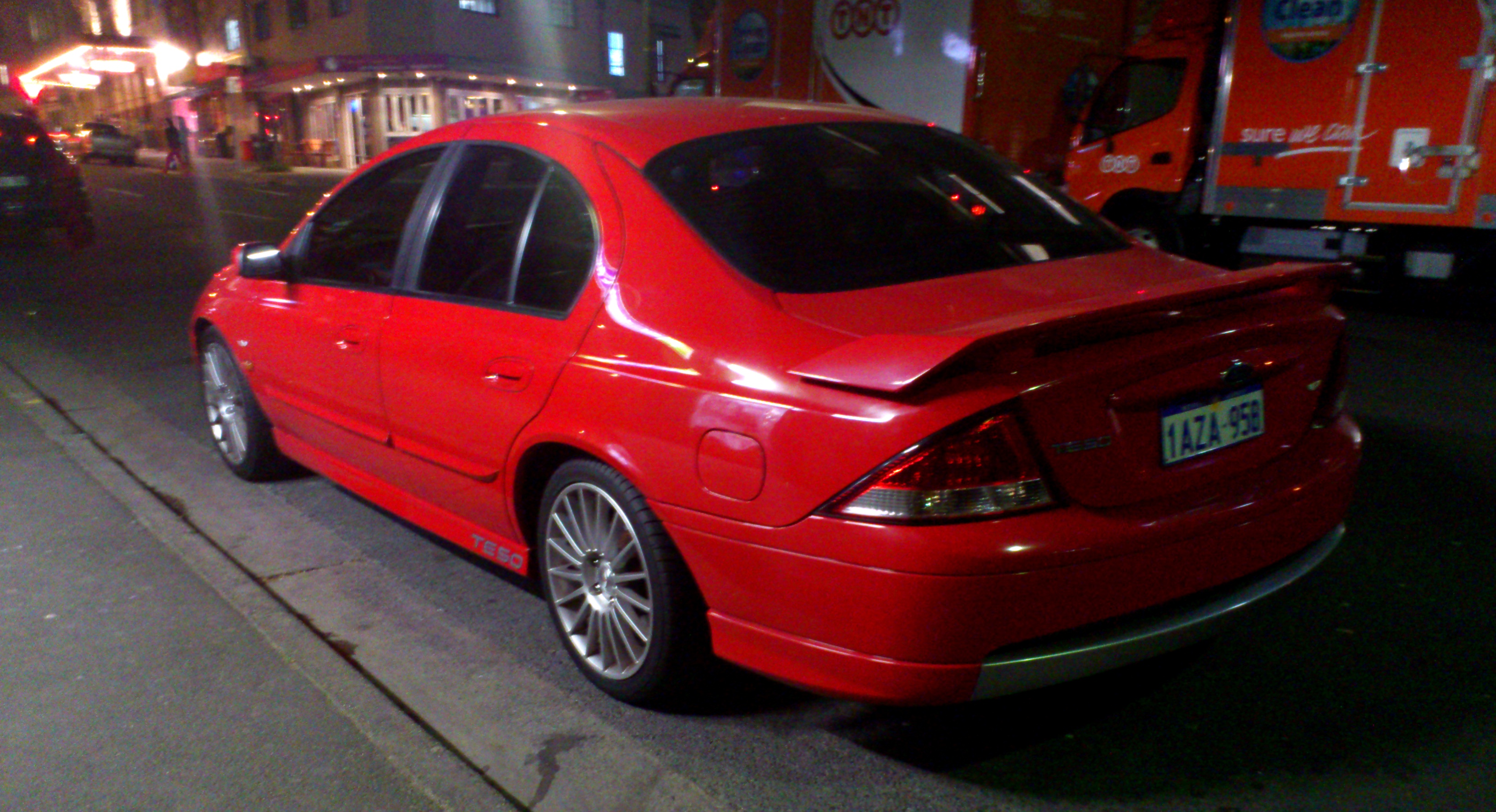
FTE TE50 (T2)

Due to inadequate sales of Ford performance sedans and Holden's success with its 5.7-litre GM V8 in its Commodore range, Ford were forced to up the ante with the XR8 and the other Falcon-derived higher performance sedans that could give buyers a comparable between the two brands and aid the sales.

Accordingly, Ford Tickford Experience (FTE) was established as a joint venture between Ford Australia and Tickford Vehicle Engineering (TVE). As listed above, the resulting T series range comprised the short wheelbase TE50 and TS50 plus the long-wheelbase TL50 (based on the Fairlane). In addition to higher mechanical specifications and performance, this range also benefitted from a "FTE Premium Assist" service with enhanced ownership benefits.

Between 1999 and 2002, there were three T series (based on the respective Falcon series): T1 (AU), T2 (AU II) and T3 (AU III). Their powerplant was a modified "Windsor" V8 renamed "Synergy 5000" that were hand-built and featured an engraved plaque bearing the name of its builder. Over the AU II and AU III period, the production of the "Windsor" was phased out, with remaining units shipped to FTE becoming the most powerful naturally aspirated electronically fuel injected (EFI) "Windsor" engines in the world used to make the Ford Falcon XR8 sedan, and the Pursuit 250 utility. These last batch of engines were named the 'Windsor Stroker'. FTE increased the displacement of the Stroker to 5.6-litres.

The TE50 was available with a 5-speed manual or 4-speed automatic transmission. The TS50 and TL50, which were not available in manual, only had the automatic transmission with "Electronic Sport Shift" (ESS). This feature was an Australian-production first in that, it was the first locally made car to have steering-wheel mounted buttons that permitted manual gear shifting.

Inside, all models featured a MOMO steering wheels and could be optioned with an upgraded Brembo braking system. Externally, FTE aimed for a more sophisticated look compared to its wilder styled rival, Holden Special Vehicles. The cars had distinctive front and rear styling highlighted by a chrome-mesh grille, 17-inch and 18-inch alloy wheels on the TE50 and TS50 models respectively, and discreet low-profile rear spoilers for the T1 series. The T2 saw the TE50 feature the XR-style rear wing, whereas the TS50 retained the low-profile version. All T3 models featured 18-inch wheels and louder V8 Racing-inspired bodykits with high-profile rear wings.

=== Verte Automotive ===
In the UK, AU utilities were imported by Verte Automotive (then a subsidiary of AC Cars) as the Verte Tempest from March 2002. Sold in XL and XLS trim levels, it was powered by the 4.0-litre inline-six on LPG only. From the last quarter of 2002, plans included powering the AC Green and Black coupes with the same engine (LPG and petrol, respectively) and eventually selling a range of Tempest XR6 and XR8 utes and sedans, ahead of the Tempest T-Series and the long-wheelbase Fairlane/LTD duo. These plans, however, never eventuated.

=== Hillier Coupes ===
In 2000, the Hillier Brothers created a two-door AU Falcon Coupe based on an Forte' spec ex-police car. This then debuted at the Summernats car festival that year. Following a deal with Ford Australia, the green car then became the red 300+ concept that then debuted at the 2001 Melbourne Motor Show in order to obtain some interest away from the Holden Monaro stand which served as a marketing ploy. Following this Roman AutoTek (now AutoTek) approached the Hillier Brothers to produce another show car, however this time it would be made with a more extreme guise. The Ford 'Arrow' coupe then debuted the following year at the 2002 Melbourne Motor Show. Hillier with AEC and Ford began to plan a low-production run of 100 Hillier coupes which they planned to sell for $135,000. Orders were then taken for up to 20 cars instead of the original 100, and Ford then left the project, killing off the Hillier Coupe from small scale production. Only three coupes were made, the Ford 300+ concept car, the Autotek 'Arrow' Coupe and a red XR8 coupe.

=== Concept cars ===
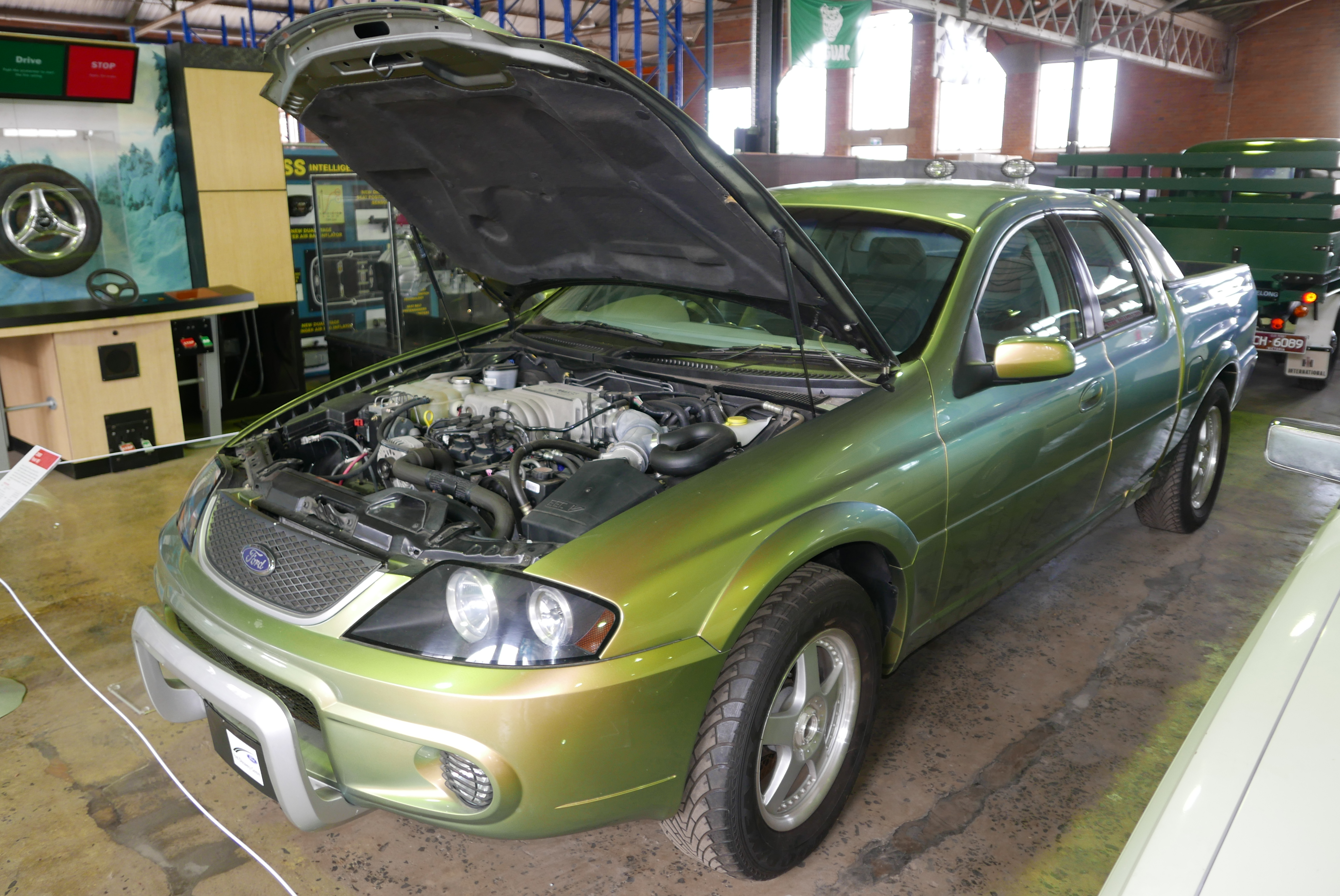
Ford R5 concept

Eager to improve Falcon's reception, Ford Australia and other companies presented a number of concept cars that were based on this sixth-generation Falcon over time. These included:

- R5 utility: unveiled at the 2000 Sydney Motor Show, this was a 220 kW (300 hp) V8-powered crew-cab, featuring rear suicide doors and ground clearance increased by 75 mm; it foreshadowed both the new design BA Falcon's dashboard as well as the 2003 standard-cab but elevated BA Falcon RTV utility range; moreover, when displayed again at the 2001 Melbourne Motor Show, it switched from rear-wheel drive to all-wheel drive as part of Ford Australia's then future plans for such a platform; the concept was painted in a special "Uluru Sunset" paint whose hues changed from yellow to purple depending on light conditions;
- Falcon XR8 Xplod sedan: unveiled in 2001 but never produced, it was a concept car painted in a distinctive "Firestorm" gold paint and powered by a 200 kW (270 hp), 5.0-litre V8 engine benefitting from a custom Remus exhaust system and Pacemaker extractors; it also featured a full Tickford body kit with bonnet air scoops and Premium brake system, 18-inch MOMO alloy wheels, a black/gold Recaro leather-trimmed interior driving seats and, importantly, a Sony "Xplod" audio and DVD system from which it derived its name;
- Falcon 300+ coupé: unveiled at the 2001 Melbourne Motor Show, this car was produced by Advanced Engine Components (AEC) and Miller Design at a cost of A$1 million, with production aspirations originally supported by Ford Australia's Geoff Polites; it was fitted with a Fairmont interior and a supercharged Ford Mustang-sourced 4.6-litre engine, which developed 350 kW (470 hp) for a 0–100 km/h (0–62 mph) sprint in 4.6 seconds; despite an intended run of at least 100 units and 15 firm orders, it never reached full production.
- Arrow coupé: unveiled at the 2002 Melbourne Motor Show, this was a more extreme coupé interpretation of the then current Falcon by aftermarket distributor Autotek and coachwork company Hillier Conversions; it featured an aggressive restyled front and was built in limited numbers at a price of A$100,000 to A$140,000 depending on specifications.

== Motorsports ==
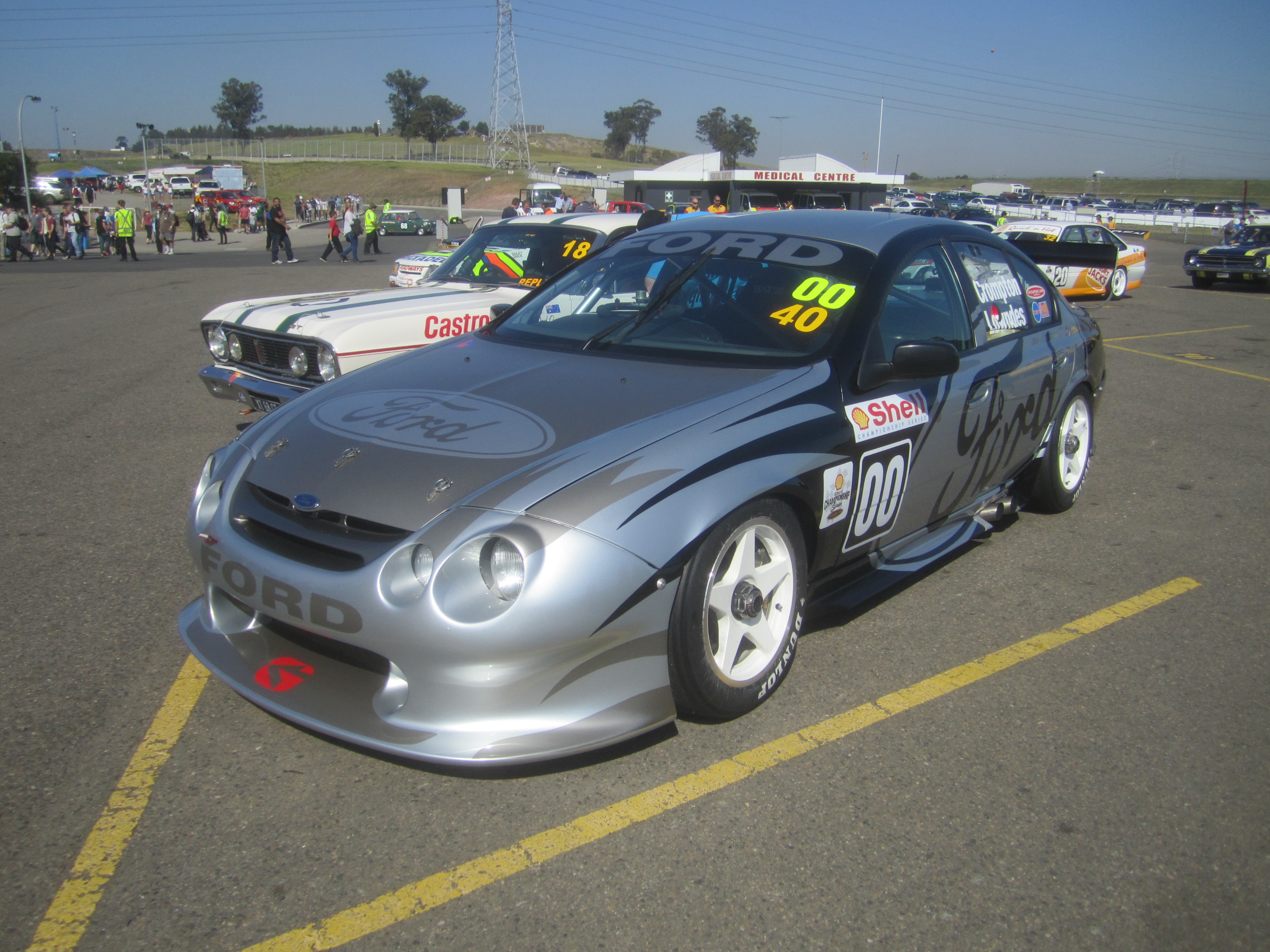
Ford AU Falcon XR8 of Gibson Motorsport (2001)

Despite its highly anticipated competitiveness that was hoped the AU would bring to Ford in the V8 Supercars Championship and the return of a works Ford team in its debut season of 1999, the aerodynamically challenged AU had very limited success, winning only 8 out of 52 rounds in its 4 years of competition. During those 52 championship rounds the AU Falcon also scored 22 pole positions, or a much healthier 42 percent of all poles which included three at the high-speed Mount Panorama circuit at Bathurst. The AU also claimed 46 fastest race laps of the 125 races held during that time, or 36 percent. The AU overall won 23 out of the 125 races in total which is roughly 19 percent total races won. The AU would be the only Falcon in the modern V8 Supercar era to not win a championship or a Bathurst 1000. Its most famous wins would be in the 2001 Queensland 500 by Paul Radisich and Steven Johnson in their No. 17 Shell Helix DJR Falcon. And again in 2002 with David Besnard and Simon Wills in their No. 9 Caltex Havoline SBR Falcon. The lack of success by Ford during the late 1990s and early 2000s prompted V8 Supercars to introduce a new platform known as "Project Blueprint" that would make the competition more evenly matched.

Privateer racer Trevor Haines raced a TE50 to 13th place in the 2002 Australian GT Production Car Championship, and later the team finished 9th outright and a Class 5 win in the 2002 Bathurst 24 Hour. Warren Luff took back to back victories in 2002 and 2003 V8 Brute Ute's series racing an AU Falcon XR8 ute. The AU falcon has also been raced in the Australian saloon car series and has been very successful.

== Issues and Criticism ==
Despite competitive pricing and high standard equipment relative to its rivals, especially for the new entry-level Forté, sales of the AU did not match those of the previous model, the EL Falcon. This was mostly due to a lack of enthusiasm from contemporary customers who found the "New Edge" styling too dramatic compared to preceding models. The AU's main competitor, the VT Commodore, outsold the Falcon by roughly 25,000 units in 1998.

Critics pointed out the extensive use of oval shapes and cheap-looking plastics, giving the dashboard a lack of perceived quality and labelling the vehicle a "laughing stock". There were also practical criticisms of the AU's shape due to the limited headroom in the front and rear, making it difficult for owners to enter and exit the vehicle.

The vehicle was characterised by some reviewers as having relatively poor suspension compliance and inadequate cabin sound insulation.

Two years after the AU had ceased production, Ford issued a recall for over 230,000 of them due to a potential steering fault, which was estimated to run into millions of dollars in labour costs.
