= 2002 Perth 300 =

Auto Race

(Western Australia) 2002 Perth 300
Event Information
- Round 6 of 13 in the 2002 V8 Supercar Championship Series
- Date: 28–30 June 2002
- Location: Perth, Western Australia
- Venue: Barbagallo Raceway
- Weather: Fine

Results
Race 1
Distance	42 laps	100 km
Pole position	Mark Skaife; Holden Racing Team	0:58.0349
Winner	Mark Skaife; Holden Racing Team	42:41.1383
Race 2
Distance	42 laps	100 km
Winner	Greg Murphy; Tom Walkinshaw Racing Australia	48:51.5977
Race 3
Distance	42 laps	100 km
Winner	Jason Bright; Holden Racing Team	47:30.1526
Round Results
First	Jason Bright; Holden Racing Team	208 pts
Second	Greg Murphy; Tom Walkinshaw Racing Australia	182 pts
Third	David Besnard; Stone Brothers Racing	122 pts

The 2002 Perth 300 (known for sponsorship reasons as the 2002 VB 300) was the sixth round of the 2002 V8 Supercar Championship Series. It was held on the weekend of 28 to 30 June on the Barbagallo Raceway in Perth, Western Australia.

The weekend was dominated by cars out of the Tom Walkinshaw stable. Mark Skaife won the opening race of the weekend with teammate Jason Bright following behind closely in second place and Greg Murphy in third. In the following race, Murphy claimed victory while Skaife endured a tough race that ended in the gravel trap at turn one. Race three was won by Bright and in doing so, claimed overall round honours to continue the Holden Racing Team's stranglehold over the championship.

== Background ==
The event was held on the weekend of 28 to 30 June 2002. It was the 26th ATCC/V8 Supercar event to be held at Barbagallo Raceway and consisted of three 100 km races with compulsory pitstops in each.

The Perth event had been under threat as the V8 Supercar establishment demanded the facilities be upgraded ahead of the 2002 event. Plans to initiate a street race fell through due to the lack of support from the local government. With the financial aid of Carlton and United Breweries, who would secure naming rights for the event, the series would return for 2002.

Mark Skaife entered the round as the championship leader in what had been a dominant campaign, having won all five of the previous rounds. The 2001 event was won by Paul Radisich.

=== Entry list ===
There were 32 drivers entered into the event with no necessitation for pre-qualifying.

Larry Perkins would not race in this round, the first V8 Supercar event he would not race in since the series' inception in 1993. Wayne Wakefield of Imrie Motorsport would also forego this round.

== Race report ==
=== Qualifying ===
Provisional pole position was secured by Jason Bright with teammate Mark Skaife being the only other driver to post a time within the 57 second bracket. Having dominated the previous years event, Dick Johnson Racing proved a major disappointment with both drivers being relegated to the back of the grid as they continued to struggle with the setup of the AU Ford Falcon.

Pos	No	Name	Team	Vehicle	Time
1	2	(Australia) Jason Bright	Holden Racing Team	Holden Commodore (VX)	57.9243
2	1	(Australia) Mark Skaife	Holden Racing Team	Holden Commodore (VX)	57.9380
3	888	(Australia) John Bowe	Brad Jones Racing	Ford Falcon (AU)	58.0104
4	02	(Australia) Rick Kelly	Holden Young Lions	Holden Commodore (VX)	58.0489
5	9	(Australia) David Besnard	Stone Brothers Racing	Ford Falcon (AU)	58.0723
6	34	(Australia) Garth Tander	Garry Rogers Motorsport	Holden Commodore (VX)	58.0855
7	15	(Australia) Todd Kelly	Tom Walkinshaw Racing Australia	Holden Commodore (VX)	58.1306
8	16	(New Zealand) Steven Richards	Perkins Engineering	Holden Commodore (VX)	58.1386
9	65	(Brazil) Max Wilson	Briggs Motorsport	Ford Falcon (AU)	58.1586
10	8	(Australia) Russell Ingall	Perkins Engineering	Holden Commodore (VX)	58.1725
11	21	(Australia) Brad Jones	Brad Jones Racing	Ford Falcon (AU)	58.1835
12	51	(New Zealand) Greg Murphy	Tom Walkinshaw Racing Australia	Holden Commodore (VX)	58.2021
13	10	(Australia) Mark Larkham	Larkham Motorsport	Ford Falcon (AU)	58.2346
14	600	(New Zealand) Simon Wills	Briggs Motorsport	Ford Falcon (AU)	58.2475
15	29	(Australia) Paul Morris	Paul Morris Motorsport	Holden Commodore (VX)	58.2666
16	4	(Australia) Marcos Ambrose	Stone Brothers Racing	Ford Falcon (AU)	58.2983
17	66	(Australia) Tony Longhurst	Briggs Motorsport	Ford Falcon (AU)	58.3358
18	00	(Australia) Craig Lowndes	00 Motorsport	Ford Falcon (AU)	58.3367
19	31	(Australia) Steven Ellery	Steven Ellery Racing	Ford Falcon (AU)	58.3769
20	27	(Australia) Neil Crompton	00 Motorsport	Ford Falcon (AU)	58.3865
21	3	(Australia) Cameron McConville	Lansvale Racing Team	Holden Commodore (VX)	58.4567
22	40	(Australia) Cameron McLean	Paragon Motorsport	Ford Falcon (AU)	58.4946
23	43	(Australia) Paul Weel	Paul Weel Racing	Ford Falcon (AU)	58.5415
24	7	(Australia) Rodney Forbes	00 Motorsport	Ford Falcon (AU)	58.5435
25	46	(New Zealand) John Faulkner	John Faulkner Racing	Holden Commodore (VX)	58.5667
26	5	(Australia) Glenn Seton	Glenn Seton Racing	Ford Falcon (AU)	58.5765
27	35	(Australia) Jason Bargwanna	Garry Rogers Motorsport	Holden Commodore (VX)	58.5826
28	021	(New Zealand) Jason Richards	Team Kiwi Racing	Holden Commodore (VT)	58.6374
29	75	(Australia) Anthony Tratt	Paul Little Racing	Ford Falcon (AU)	58.6664
30	18	(New Zealand) Paul Radisich	Dick Johnson Racing	Ford Falcon (AU)	58.6995
31	54	(New Zealand) Craig Baird	Rod Nash Racing	Holden Commodore (VX)	58.9377
32	17	(Australia) Steven Johnson	Dick Johnson Racing	Ford Falcon (AU)	59.2977

=== Top ten shootout ===
Pos	No	Name	Team	Vehicle	Time
1	1	(Australia) Mark Skaife	Holden Racing Team	Holden Commodore (VX)	58.0349
2	2	(Australia) Jason Bright	Holden Racing Team	Holden Commodore (VX)	58.2295
3	65	(Brazil) Max Wilson	Briggs Motorsport	Ford Falcon (AU)	58.3329
4	15	(Australia) Todd Kelly	Tom Walkinshaw Racing Australia	Holden Commodore (VX)	58.3728
5	9	(Australia) David Besnard	Stone Brothers Racing	Ford Falcon (AU)	58.5029
6	888	(Australia) John Bowe	Brad Jones Racing	Ford Falcon (AU)	58.5421
7	34	(Australia) Garth Tander	Garry Rogers Motorsport	Holden Commodore (VX)	58.5926
8	02	(Australia) Rick Kelly	Holden Young Lions	Holden Commodore (VX)	58.6866
9	8	(Australia) Russell Ingall	Perkins Engineering	Holden Commodore (VX)	58.7942
10	16	(New Zealand) Steven Richards	Perkins Engineering	Holden Commodore (VX)	58.9084

=== Race 1 ===
Pos	No	Name	Team	Vehicle	Laps	Time/Retired	Grid
1	1	(Australia) Mark Skaife	Holden Racing Team	Holden Commodore (VX)	42	42:41.1383	1
2	2	(Australia) Jason Bright	Holden Racing Team	Holden Commodore (VX)	42	+ 0.766	2
3	51	(New Zealand) Greg Murphy	Tom Walkinshaw Racing Australia	Holden Commodore (VX)	42	+ 1.399	12
4	15	(Australia) Todd Kelly	Tom Walkinshaw Racing Australia	Holden Commodore (VX)	42	+ 10.097	4
5	00	(Australia) Craig Lowndes	00 Motorsport	Ford Falcon (AU)	42	+ 13.242	18
6	4	(Australia) Marcos Ambrose	Stone Brothers Racing	Ford Falcon (AU)	42	+ 17.276	16
7	9	(Australia) David Besnard	Stone Brothers Racing	Ford Falcon (AU)	42	+ 25.085	5
8	16	(New Zealand) Steven Richards	Perkins Engineering	Holden Commodore (VX)	42	+ 28.174	10
9	888	(Australia) John Bowe	Brad Jones Racing	Ford Falcon (AU)	42	+ 28.432	6
10	66	(Australia) Tony Longhurst	Briggs Motorsport	Ford Falcon (AU)	42	+ 29.402	17
11	43	(Australia) Paul Weel	Paul Weel Racing	Ford Falcon (AU)	42	+ 29.731	23
12	65	(Brazil) Max Wilson	Briggs Motorsport	Ford Falcon (AU)	42	+ 30.155	3
13	27	(Australia) Neil Crompton	00 Motorsport	Ford Falcon (AU)	42	+ 35.905	20
14	29	(Australia) Paul Morris	Paul Morris Motorsport	Holden Commodore (VX)	42	+ 37.141	15
15	600	(New Zealand) Simon Wills	Briggs Motorsport	Ford Falcon (AU)	42	+ 38.173	14
16	8	(Australia) Russell Ingall	Perkins Engineering	Holden Commodore (VX)	42	+ 39.114	9
17	02	(Australia) Rick Kelly	Holden Young Lions	Holden Commodore (VX)	42	+ 39.141	8
18	35	(Australia) Jason Bargwanna	Garry Rogers Motorsport	Holden Commodore (VX)	42	+ 40.968	27
19	10	(Australia) Mark Larkham	Larkham Motorsport	Ford Falcon (AU)	42	+ 48.615	13
20	31	(Australia) Steven Ellery	Steven Ellery Racing	Ford Falcon (AU)	42	+ 48.679	19
21	40	(Australia) Cameron McLean	Paragon Motorsport	Ford Falcon (AU)	42	+ 49.995	22
22	5	(Australia) Glenn Seton	Glenn Seton Racing	Ford Falcon (AU)	42	+ 51.151	26
23	3	(Australia) Cameron McConville	Lansvale Racing Team	Holden Commodore (VX)	42	+ 51.940	21
24	18	(New Zealand) Paul Radisich	Dick Johnson Racing	Ford Falcon (AU)	42	+ 54.107	30
25	54	(New Zealand) Craig Baird	Rod Nash Racing	Holden Commodore (VX)	42	+ 56.344	31
26	021	(New Zealand) Jason Richards	Team Kiwi Racing	Holden Commodore (VT)	42	+ 59.685	28
27	75	(Australia) Anthony Tratt	Paul Little Racing	Ford Falcon (AU)	41	+ 1 lap	29
28	46	(New Zealand) John Faulkner	John Faulkner Racing	Holden Commodore (VX)	41	+ 1 lap	25
29	7	(Australia) Rodney Forbes	00 Motorsport	Ford Falcon (AU)	41	+ 1 lap	24
30	21	(Australia) Brad Jones	Brad Jones Racing	Ford Falcon (AU)	38	+ 4 laps	11
31	34	(Australia) Garth Tander	Garry Rogers Motorsport	Holden Commodore (VX)	37	+ 5 laps	7
Ret	17	(Australia) Steven Johnson	Dick Johnson Racing	Ford Falcon (AU)	24	Retired	32
Fastest Lap: Todd Kelly (Tom Walkinshaw Racing Australia) - 58.7621 on lap 6

=== Race 2 ===
Pos	No	Name	Team	Vehicle	Laps	Time/Retired	Grid
1	51	(New Zealand) Greg Murphy	Tom Walkinshaw Racing Australia	Holden Commodore (VX)	42	48:51.5977	3
2	2	(Australia) Jason Bright	Holden Racing Team	Holden Commodore (VX)	42	+ 0.220	2
3	888	(Australia) John Bowe	Brad Jones Racing	Ford Falcon (AU)	42	+ 1.071	9
4	66	(Australia) Tony Longhurst	Briggs Motorsport	Ford Falcon (AU)	42	+ 9.049	10
5	3	(Australia) Cameron McConville	Lansvale Racing Team	Holden Commodore (VX)	42	+ 9.717	23
6	27	(Australia) Neil Crompton	00 Motorsport	Ford Falcon (AU)	42	+ 10.207	13
7	9	(Australia) David Besnard	Stone Brothers Racing	Ford Falcon (AU)	42	+ 13.698	7
8	21	(Australia) Brad Jones	Brad Jones Racing	Ford Falcon (AU)	42	+ 14.197	30
9	40	(Australia) Cameron McLean	Paragon Motorsport	Ford Falcon (AU)	42	+ 16.552	21
10	29	(Australia) Paul Morris	Paul Morris Motorsport	Holden Commodore (VX)	42	+ 23.921	14
11	7	(Australia) Rodney Forbes	00 Motorsport	Ford Falcon (AU)	42	+ 24.666	29
12	46	(New Zealand) John Faulkner	John Faulkner Racing	Holden Commodore (VX)	42	+ 24.988	28
13	35	(Australia) Jason Bargwanna	Garry Rogers Motorsport	Holden Commodore (VX)	42	+ 25.561	18
14	021	(New Zealand) Jason Richards	Team Kiwi Racing	Holden Commodore (VT)	42	+ 25.646	26
15	65	(Brazil) Max Wilson	Briggs Motorsport	Ford Falcon (AU)	42	+ 25.818	12
16	18	(New Zealand) Paul Radisich	Dick Johnson Racing	Ford Falcon (AU)	42	+ 26.602	24
17	16	(New Zealand) Steven Richards	Perkins Engineering	Holden Commodore (VX)	42	+ 28.265	8
18	5	(Australia) Glenn Seton	Glenn Seton Racing	Ford Falcon (AU)	42	+ 28.327	22
19	54	(New Zealand) Craig Baird	Rod Nash Racing	Holden Commodore (VX)	42	+ 28.988	25
20	02	(Australia) Rick Kelly	Holden Young Lions	Holden Commodore (VX)	42	+ 29.146	17
21	43	(Australia) Paul Weel	Paul Weel Racing	Ford Falcon (AU)	42	+ 31.738	11
22	600	(New Zealand) Simon Wills	Briggs Motorsport	Ford Falcon (AU)	42	+ 31.970	15
23	17	(Australia) Steven Johnson	Dick Johnson Racing	Ford Falcon (AU)	42	+ 32.266	32
24	4	(Australia) Marcos Ambrose	Stone Brothers Racing	Ford Falcon (AU)	42	+ 34.391	6
25	34	(Australia) Garth Tander	Garry Rogers Motorsport	Holden Commodore (VX)	42	+ 40.127	31
26	31	(Australia) Steven Ellery	Steven Ellery Racing	Ford Falcon (AU)	42	+ 58.596	20
27	8	(Australia) Russell Ingall	Perkins Engineering	Holden Commodore (VX)	42	+ 59.446	16
28	00	(Australia) Craig Lowndes	00 Motorsport	Ford Falcon (AU)	41	+ 1 lap	5
29	75	(Australia) Anthony Tratt	Paul Little Racing	Ford Falcon (AU)	37	+ 5 laps	27
Ret	15	(Australia) Todd Kelly	Tom Walkinshaw Racing Australia	Holden Commodore (VX)	34	Mechanical	4
Ret	1	(Australia) Mark Skaife	Holden Racing Team	Holden Commodore (VX)	22	Spun off	1
Ret	10	(Australia) Mark Larkham	Larkham Motorsport	Ford Falcon (AU)	21	Retired	19
Fastest Lap: Mark Skaife (Holden Racing Team) - 59.5022 on lap 3

=== Race 3 ===
Pos	No	Name	Team	Vehicle	Laps	Time/Retired	Grid
1	2	(Australia) Jason Bright	Holden Racing Team	Holden Commodore (VX)	42	47:30.1526	2
2	9	(Australia) David Besnard	Stone Brothers Racing	Ford Falcon (AU)	42	+ 1.490	7
3	51	(New Zealand) Greg Murphy	Tom Walkinshaw Racing Australia	Holden Commodore (VX)	42	+ 5.079	1
4	21	(Australia) Brad Jones	Brad Jones Racing	Ford Falcon (AU)	42	+ 7.178	8
5	15	(Australia) Todd Kelly	Tom Walkinshaw Racing Australia	Holden Commodore (VX)	42	+ 12.214	30
6	34	(Australia) Garth Tander	Garry Rogers Motorsport	Holden Commodore (VX)	42	+ 12.485	25
7	1	(Australia) Mark Skaife	Holden Racing Team	Holden Commodore (VX)	42	+ 18.819	31
8	35	(Australia) Jason Bargwanna	Garry Rogers Motorsport	Holden Commodore (VX)	42	+ 23.428	13
9	3	(Australia) Cameron McConville	Lansvale Racing Team	Holden Commodore (VX)	42	+ 23.874	5
10	4	(Australia) Marcos Ambrose	Stone Brothers Racing	Ford Falcon (AU)	42	+ 24.291	24
11	29	(Australia) Paul Morris	Paul Morris Motorsport	Holden Commodore (VX)	42	+ 27.358	10
12	40	(Australia) Cameron McLean	Paragon Motorsport	Ford Falcon (AU)	42	+ 27.854	9
13	02	(Australia) Rick Kelly	Holden Young Lions	Holden Commodore (VX)	42	+ 28.803	20
14	8	(Australia) Russell Ingall	Perkins Engineering	Holden Commodore (VX)	42	+ 30.535	27
15	888	(Australia) John Bowe	Brad Jones Racing	Ford Falcon (AU)	42	+ 31.535	3
16	31	(Australia) Steven Ellery	Steven Ellery Racing	Ford Falcon (AU)	42	+ 31.539	26
17	00	(Australia) Craig Lowndes	00 Motorsport	Ford Falcon (AU)	42	+ 35.262	28
18	27	(Australia) Neil Crompton	00 Motorsport	Ford Falcon (AU)	42	+ 35.630	6
19	65	(Brazil) Max Wilson	Briggs Motorsport	Ford Falcon (AU)	42	+ 37.022	15
20	021	(New Zealand) Jason Richards	Team Kiwi Racing	Holden Commodore (VT)	42	+ 38.438	13
21	5	(Australia) Glenn Seton	Glenn Seton Racing	Ford Falcon (AU)	42	+ 40.305	18
22	600	(New Zealand) Simon Wills	Briggs Motorsport	Ford Falcon (AU)	42	+ 40.992	22
23	16	(New Zealand) Steven Richards	Perkins Engineering	Holden Commodore (VX)	42	+ 44.481	17
24	46	(New Zealand) John Faulkner	John Faulkner Racing	Holden Commodore (VX)	42	+ 45.268	12
25	17	(Australia) Steven Johnson	Dick Johnson Racing	Ford Falcon (AU)	42	+ 47.745	23
26	7	(Australia) Rodney Forbes	00 Motorsport	Ford Falcon (AU)	42	+ 53.050	11
27	43	(Australia) Paul Weel	Paul Weel Racing	Ford Falcon (AU)	37	+ 5 laps	21
28	75	(Australia) Anthony Tratt	Paul Little Racing	Ford Falcon (AU)	36	+ 6 laps	29
29	66	(Australia) Tony Longhurst	Briggs Motorsport	Ford Falcon (AU)	32	+ 10 laps	4
Ret	18	(New Zealand) Paul Radisich	Dick Johnson Racing	Ford Falcon (AU)	34	Steering arm	16
Ret	10	(Australia) Mark Larkham	Larkham Motorsport	Ford Falcon (AU)	31	Retired	32
Ret	54	(New Zealand) Craig Baird	Rod Nash Racing	Holden Commodore (VX)	3	Suspension	19
Fastest Lap: David Besnard (Stone Brothers Racing) - 59.3526 on lap 19

== Championship standings ==
Pos.	No	Driver	Team	Pts
1	1	(Australia) Mark Skaife	Holden Racing Team	1493
2	51	(New Zealand) Greg Murphy	Tom Walkinshaw Racing Australia	884
3	15	(Australia) Todd Kelly	Tom Walkinshaw Racing Australia	802
4	2	(Australia) Jason Bright	Holden Racing Team	752
5	4	(Australia) Marcos Ambrose	Stone Brothers Racing	677
