= 2002 V8 Supercars Winton round =

2002 sports event

(Victoria (state)) 2002 V8 Supercars Winton round
Event Information
- Round 8 of 13 in the 2002 V8 Supercar Championship Series
- Date: 16–18 August 2002
- Location: Benalla, Victoria
- Venue: Winton Motor Raceway
- Weather: Fine

Results
Race 1
Distance	32 laps	100 km
Pole position	Marcos Ambrose; Stone Brothers Racing	1:22.9447
Winner	Jason Bright; Holden Racing Team	45:45.9302
Race 2
Distance	32 laps	100 km
Winner	Jason Bright; Holden Racing Team	52:36.4250
Round Results
First	Jason Bright; Holden Racing Team	200 pts
Second	Todd Kelly; Tom Walkinshaw Racing Australia	144 pts
Third	Marcos Ambrose; Stone Brothers Racing	132 pts

The 2002 V8 Supercars Winton round was the eighth round of the 2002 V8 Supercar Championship Series. It was the 16th ATCC/V8 Supercar event to be held at Winton and was held on the weekend of 16 to 18 August at the Winton Motor Raceway in Benalla, Victoria.

Jason Bright continued the Holden Racing Team's dominant 2002 season by winning both races of the weekend and took overall round honours in the process. This also marked the Holden Racing Team's eighth round victory from eight rounds in the 2002 championship as well as their first round victory at the Winton Motor Raceway in its history. Teammate and championship leader Mark Skaife endured a tricky weekend with a botched pitstop in race two losing him valuable track position.

== Background ==
The event was held on the weekend of 16 to 18 August 2002. It was the 16th ATCC/V8 Supercar event to be held at Winton and consisted of two 100 km races with compulsory pitstops.

Mark Skaife entered the round as the championship leader with a 797-point gap over nearest competitor, Jason Bright. The winner of the 2001 event was Russell Ingall.

=== Entry list ===
There were 36 drivers entered into the event with no necessitation for pre-qualifying.

Simon Wills was released from his contract with Briggs Motorsport at the conclusion of the Oran Park round. He would be replaced by Steve Owen.

This event also marked the last solo appearance for Wayne Wakefield at Imrie Motorsport. Likewise, Paul Romano would not return to this series after this round until the 2003 Adelaide 500 with his privateer outfit.

The Garry Rogers Motorsport drivers swapped car numbers for this round. The reason given was the historical success with the number 35 at Winton and Garth Tander's placement in the driver standings compared to Jason Bargwanna.

== Race report ==
=== Qualifying ===
Jason Bright secured provisional pole position by one thousandth of a second over teammate, Mark Skaife.

Pos	No	Name	Team	Vehicle	Time
1	2	(Australia) Jason Bright	Holden Racing Team	Holden Commodore (VX)	1:22.6618
2	1	(Australia) Mark Skaife	Holden Racing Team	Holden Commodore (VX)	1:22.6624
3	4	(Australia) Marcos Ambrose	Stone Brothers Racing	Ford Falcon (AU)	1:22.7117
4	15	(Australia) Todd Kelly	Tom Walkinshaw Racing Australia	Holden Commodore (VX)	1:22.7658
5	51	(New Zealand) Greg Murphy	Tom Walkinshaw Racing Australia	Holden Commodore (VX)	1:22.8852
6	9	(Australia) David Besnard	Stone Brothers Racing	Ford Falcon (AU)	1:22.8909
7	35	(Australia) Garth Tander	Garry Rogers Motorsport	Holden Commodore (VX)	1:22.9428
8	888	(Australia) John Bowe	Brad Jones Racing	Ford Falcon (AU)	1:23.0366
9	02	(Australia) Rick Kelly	Holden Young Lions	Holden Commodore (VX)	1:23.0503
10	00	(Australia) Craig Lowndes	00 Motorsport	Ford Falcon (AU)	1:23.1059
11	21	(Australia) Brad Jones	Brad Jones Racing	Ford Falcon (AU)	1:23.1198
12	34	(Australia) Jason Bargwanna	Garry Rogers Motorsport	Holden Commodore (VX)	1:23.1220
13	16	(New Zealand) Steven Richards	Perkins Engineering	Holden Commodore (VX)	1:23.1285
14	8	(Australia) Russell Ingall	Perkins Engineering	Holden Commodore (VX)	1:23.1968
15	5	(Australia) Glenn Seton	Glenn Seton Racing	Ford Falcon (AU)	1:23.2137
16	11	(Australia) Larry Perkins	Perkins Engineering	Holden Commodore (VX)	1:23.3730
17	10	(Australia) Mark Larkham	Larkham Motorsport	Ford Falcon (AU)	1:23.4253
18	27	(Australia) Neil Crompton	00 Motorsport	Ford Falcon (AU)	1:23.4661
19	40	(Australia) Cameron McLean	Paragon Motorsport	Ford Falcon (AU)	1:23.5763
20	43	(Australia) Paul Weel	Paul Weel Racing	Ford Falcon (AU)	1:23.6809
21	46	(New Zealand) John Faulkner	John Faulkner Racing	Holden Commodore (VX)	1:23.7335
22	65	(Brazil) Max Wilson	Briggs Motorsport	Ford Falcon (AU)	1:23.8233
23	7	(Australia) Rodney Forbes	00 Motorsport	Ford Falcon (AU)	1:23.8295
24	54	(New Zealand) Craig Baird	Rod Nash Racing	Holden Commodore (VX)	1:23.8741
25	31	(Australia) Steven Ellery	Steven Ellery Racing	Ford Falcon (AU)	1:23.9413
26	29	(Australia) Paul Morris	Paul Morris Motorsport	Holden Commodore (VX)	1:24.0877
27	600	(Australia) Steve Owen	Briggs Motorsport	Ford Falcon (AU)	1:24.1420
28	3	(Australia) Cameron McConville	Lansvale Racing Team	Holden Commodore (VX)	1:24.1993
29	66	(Australia) Tony Longhurst	Briggs Motorsport	Ford Falcon (AU)	1:24.3461
30	24	(Australia) Paul Romano	Romano Racing	Holden Commodore (VX)	1:24.4271
31	75	(Australia) Anthony Tratt	Paul Little Racing	Ford Falcon (AU)	1:24.4895
32	18	(New Zealand) Paul Radisich	Dick Johnson Racing	Ford Falcon (AU)	1:24.5407
33	17	(Australia) Steven Johnson	Dick Johnson Racing	Ford Falcon (AU)	1:24.5577
34	021	(New Zealand) Jason Richards	Team Kiwi Racing	Holden Commodore (VT)	1:24.6153
35	22	(Australia) Dugal McDougall	McDougall Motorsport	Holden Commodore (VX)	1:24.6975
36	14	(Australia) Wayne Wakefield	Imrie Motorsport	Holden Commodore (VX)	1:24.8356

=== Top ten shootout ===
Pos	No	Name	Team	Vehicle	Time
1	4	(Australia) Marcos Ambrose	Stone Brothers Racing	Ford Falcon (AU)	1:22.9447
2	1	(Australia) Mark Skaife	Holden Racing Team	Holden Commodore (VX)	1:23.3837
3	2	(Australia) Jason Bright	Holden Racing Team	Holden Commodore (VX)	1:23.3838
4	15	(Australia) Todd Kelly	Tom Walkinshaw Racing Australia	Holden Commodore (VX)	1:23.5477
5	51	(New Zealand) Greg Murphy	Tom Walkinshaw Racing Australia	Holden Commodore (VX)	1:23.5875
6	35	(Australia) Garth Tander	Garry Rogers Motorsport	Holden Commodore (VX)	1:23.7475
7	888	(Australia) John Bowe	Brad Jones Racing	Ford Falcon (AU)	1:23.8619
8	02	(Australia) Rick Kelly	Holden Young Lions	Holden Commodore (VX)	1:24.2144
9	00	(Australia) Craig Lowndes	00 Motorsport	Ford Falcon (AU)	1:24.4080
10	9	(Australia) David Besnard	Stone Brothers Racing	Ford Falcon (AU)	1:25.1901

=== Race 1 ===
Pos	No	Name	Team	Vehicle	Laps	Time/Retired	Grid
1	2	(Australia) Jason Bright	Holden Racing Team	Holden Commodore (VX)	32	45:45.9302	3
2	4	(Australia) Marcos Ambrose	Stone Brothers Racing	Ford Falcon (AU)	32	+ 0.933	1
3	15	(Australia) Todd Kelly	Tom Walkinshaw Racing Australia	Holden Commodore (VX)	32	+ 6.188	4
4	1	(Australia) Mark Skaife	Holden Racing Team	Holden Commodore (VX)	32	+ 6.903	2
5	51	(New Zealand) Greg Murphy	Tom Walkinshaw Racing Australia	Holden Commodore (VX)	32	+ 7.105	5
6	35	(Australia) Garth Tander	Garry Rogers Motorsport	Holden Commodore (VX)	32	+ 11.078	6
7	02	(Australia) Rick Kelly	Holden Young Lions	Holden Commodore (VX)	32	+ 14.303	8
8	888	(Australia) John Bowe	Brad Jones Racing	Ford Falcon (AU)	32	+ 19.520	7
9	8	(Australia) Russell Ingall	Perkins Engineering	Holden Commodore (VX)	32	+ 22.781	14
10	21	(Australia) Brad Jones	Brad Jones Racing	Ford Falcon (AU)	32	+ 24.474	11
11	9	(Australia) David Besnard	Stone Brothers Racing	Ford Falcon (AU)	32	+ 29.747	10
12	16	(New Zealand) Steven Richards	Perkins Engineering	Holden Commodore (VX)	32	+ 29.986	13
13	27	(Australia) Neil Crompton	00 Motorsport	Ford Falcon (AU)	32	+ 41.142	18
14	11	(Australia) Larry Perkins	Perkins Engineering	Holden Commodore (VX)	32	+ 48.235	16
15	40	(Australia) Cameron McLean	Paragon Motorsport	Ford Falcon (AU)	32	+ 49.108	19
16	7	(Australia) Rodney Forbes	00 Motorsport	Ford Falcon (AU)	32	+ 49.380	23
17	18	(New Zealand) Paul Radisich	Dick Johnson Racing	Ford Falcon (AU)	32	+ 55.913	32
18	65	(Brazil) Max Wilson	Briggs Motorsport	Ford Falcon (AU)	32	+ 58.873	22
19	46	(New Zealand) John Faulkner	John Faulkner Racing	Holden Commodore (VX)	32	+ 59.564	21
20	66	(Australia) Tony Longhurst	Briggs Motorsport	Ford Falcon (AU)	32	+ 1:03.519	29
21	54	(New Zealand) Craig Baird	Rod Nash Racing	Holden Commodore (VX)	32	+ 1:04.079	24
22	34	(Australia) Jason Bargwanna	Garry Rogers Motorsport	Holden Commodore (VX)	32	+ 1:04.775	12
23	021	(New Zealand) Jason Richards	Team Kiwi Racing	Holden Commodore (VT)	32	+ 1:05.267	34
24	3	(Australia) Cameron McConville	Lansvale Racing Team	Holden Commodore (VX)	32	+ 1:05.624	28
25	00	(Australia) Craig Lowndes	00 Motorsport	Ford Falcon (AU)	32	+ 1:06.569	9
26	5	(Australia) Glenn Seton	Glenn Seton Racing	Ford Falcon (AU)	32	+ 1:07.027	15
27	17	(Australia) Steven Johnson	Dick Johnson Racing	Ford Falcon (AU)	32	+ 1:07.337	33
28	10	(Australia) Mark Larkham	Larkham Motorsport	Ford Falcon (AU)	32	+ 1:11.602	17
29	600	(Australia) Steve Owen	Briggs Motorsport	Ford Falcon (AU)	32	+ 1:11.978	27
30	31	(Australia) Steven Ellery	Steven Ellery Racing	Ford Falcon (AU)	32	+ 1:18.877	25
31	14	(Australia) Wayne Wakefield	Imrie Motorsport	Holden Commodore (VX)	32	+ 1:25.058	36
32	24	(Australia) Paul Romano	Romano Racing	Holden Commodore (VX)	31	+ 1 lap	30
33	22	(Australia) Dugal McDougall	McDougall Motorsport	Holden Commodore (VX)	31	+ 1 lap	35
34	43	(Australia) Paul Weel	Paul Weel Racing	Ford Falcon (AU)	31	+ 1 lap	20
Ret	29	(Australia) Paul Morris	Paul Morris Motorsport	Holden Commodore (VX)	28	Retired	26
Ret	75	(Australia) Anthony Tratt	Paul Little Racing	Ford Falcon (AU)	0	Retired	31
Fastest Lap: Todd Kelly (Tom Walkinshaw Racing Australia) - 1:23.4514 on lap 7

=== Race 2 ===
Pos	No	Name	Team	Vehicle	Laps	Time/Retired	Grid
1	2	(Australia) Jason Bright	Holden Racing Team	Holden Commodore (VX)	32	52:36.4250	1
2	15	(Australia) Todd Kelly	Tom Walkinshaw Racing Australia	Holden Commodore (VX)	32	+ 0.517	3
3	51	(New Zealand) Greg Murphy	Tom Walkinshaw Racing Australia	Holden Commodore (VX)	32	+ 1.408	5
4	4	(Australia) Marcos Ambrose	Stone Brothers Racing	Ford Falcon (AU)	32	+ 2.058	2
5	35	(Australia) Garth Tander	Garry Rogers Motorsport	Holden Commodore (VX)	32	+ 2.653	6
6	8	(Australia) Russell Ingall	Perkins Engineering	Holden Commodore (VX)	32	+ 4.567	9
7	16	(New Zealand) Steven Richards	Perkins Engineering	Holden Commodore (VX)	32	+ 4.992	12
8	9	(Australia) David Besnard	Stone Brothers Racing	Ford Falcon (AU)	32	+ 7.991	11
9	1	(Australia) Mark Skaife	Holden Racing Team	Holden Commodore (VX)	32	+ 8.106	4
10	21	(Australia) Brad Jones	Brad Jones Racing	Ford Falcon (AU)	32	+ 9.075	10
11	888	(Australia) John Bowe	Brad Jones Racing	Ford Falcon (AU)	32	+ 9.631	8
12	34	(Australia) Jason Bargwanna	Garry Rogers Motorsport	Holden Commodore (VX)	32	+ 11.462	22
13	02	(Australia) Rick Kelly	Holden Young Lions	Holden Commodore (VX)	32	+ 11.746	7
14	54	(New Zealand) Craig Baird	Rod Nash Racing	Holden Commodore (VX)	32	+ 14.079	21
15	7	(Australia) Rodney Forbes	00 Motorsport	Ford Falcon (AU)	32	+ 14.579	16
16	29	(Australia) Paul Morris	Paul Morris Motorsport	Holden Commodore (VX)	32	+ 19.907	35
17	11	(Australia) Larry Perkins	Perkins Engineering	Holden Commodore (VX)	32	+ 22.836	14
18	27	(Australia) Neil Crompton	00 Motorsport	Ford Falcon (AU)	32	+ 24.013	13
19	40	(Australia) Cameron McLean	Paragon Motorsport	Ford Falcon (AU)	32	+ 26.013	15
20	021	(New Zealand) Jason Richards	Team Kiwi Racing	Holden Commodore (VT)	32	+ 26.559	23
21	5	(Australia) Glenn Seton	Glenn Seton Racing	Ford Falcon (AU)	32	+ 26.830	26
22	24	(Australia) Paul Romano	Romano Racing	Holden Commodore (VX)	32	+ 32.344	32
23	31	(Australia) Steven Ellery	Steven Ellery Racing	Ford Falcon (AU)	32	+ 35.610	30
24	10	(Australia) Mark Larkham	Larkham Motorsport	Ford Falcon (AU)	32	+ 42.125	28
25	22	(Australia) Dugal McDougall	McDougall Motorsport	Holden Commodore (VX)	32	+ 42.530	33
26	3	(Australia) Cameron McConville	Lansvale Racing Team	Holden Commodore (VX)	32	+ 44.333	24
27	600	(Australia) Steve Owen	Briggs Motorsport	Ford Falcon (AU)	32	+ 1:06.861	29
28	14	(Australia) Wayne Wakefield	Imrie Motorsport	Holden Commodore (VX)	30	+ 2 laps	31
29	65	(Brazil) Max Wilson	Briggs Motorsport	Ford Falcon (AU)	30	+ 2 laps	18
30	66	(Australia) Tony Longhurst	Briggs Motorsport	Ford Falcon (AU)	29	+ 3 laps	20
31	75	(Australia) Anthony Tratt	Paul Little Racing	Ford Falcon (AU)	29	+ 3 laps	36
32	43	(Australia) Paul Weel	Paul Weel Racing	Ford Falcon (AU)	29	+ 3 laps	34
Ret	17	(Australia) Steven Johnson	Dick Johnson Racing	Ford Falcon (AU)	26	Retired	27
Ret	18	(New Zealand) Paul Radisich	Dick Johnson Racing	Ford Falcon (AU)	19	Retired	17
Ret	00	(Australia) Craig Lowndes	00 Motorsport	Ford Falcon (AU)	7	Retired	25
Ret	46	(New Zealand) John Faulkner	John Faulkner Racing	Holden Commodore (VX)	0	Accident	19
Fastest Lap: Jason Bright (Holden Racing Team) - 1:23.1514 on lap 11
