= 2002 Canberra 400 =

Auto Race

(Australian Capital Territory) 2002 Canberra 400
Event Information
- Round 5 of 13 in the 2002 V8 Supercar Championship Series
- Date: 7–9 June 2002
- Location: Canberra, Australian Capital Territory
- Venue: Canberra Street Circuit
- Weather: Overcast

Results
Race 1
Distance	25 laps	100 km
Pole position	Craig Lowndes; 00 Motorsport	1:44.4035
Winner	Mark Skaife; Holden Racing Team	45:05.6630
Race 2
Distance	25 laps	100 km
Winner	Russell Ingall; Perkins Engineering	47:51.6151
Race 3
Distance	50 laps	200 km
Winner	Mark Skaife; Holden Racing Team	1:38:00.2749
Round Results
First	Mark Skaife; Holden Racing Team	340 pts
Second	Todd Kelly; Tom Walkinshaw Racing Australia	266 pts
Third	Craig Lowndes; 00 Motorsport	195 pts

The 2002 Canberra 400 (known for sponsorship reasons as the 2002 Stegbar Canberra 400) was the fifth round of the 2002 V8 Supercar Championship Series and the third and final running of the Canberra 400 event. It was held on the weekend of 7 to 9 June on the Canberra Street Circuit in Canberra, Australian Capital Territory.

Mark Skaife extended his championship lead by winning two out of the weekend's three races en route to taking overall round honours. This weekend also featured the sole reverse grid race of the season which was won by Russell Ingall. Todd Kelly finished second overall for the weekend while Craig Lowndes claimed third.

Despite having a five-year contract, the 2002 Canberra 400 event would be the last to be held and the series would not return for 2003. The main reason given for the cancellation of the contract was the amount of money being spent on the race and the lack of return compared to what was expected. Kate Carnell's initial estimation on cost blew out as the years went on, and some Canberrans believed that this money was better spent elsewhere. A report by the Auditor General of the Australian Capital Territory in 2002 summarised that the benefits of the race were overstated and costs were underestimated.

== Background ==
The event was held on the weekend of 7 to 9 June 2002. It was the third V8 Supercar event to be held on the streets of Canberra and consisted of two 100 km races followed by a 200 km final. In contrast the heat of Darwin, the Canberra event was marked by comparatively cold temperatures. The spectator attendance had dropped from 101,000 in 2000 to 89,000 in 2002, and the cold climate was cited as a key reason behind this.

Mark Skaife entered the round as the championship leader in what had been a dominant campaign, having won all four of the previous rounds and won eight out of the ten races run. The 2001 event was won by Steven Johnson.

=== Entry list ===
There were 34 drivers entered into the event with no necessitation for pre-qualifying.

Wayne Wakefield replaced Stephen White at Imrie Motorsport. It would be Wakefield's only solo appearance in the championship for the 2002 season.

== Race report ==
=== Qualifying ===
Pos	No	Name	Team	Vehicle	Time
1	2	(Australia) Jason Bright	Holden Racing Team	Holden Commodore (VX)	1:43.7613
2	4	(Australia) Marcos Ambrose	Stone Brothers Racing	Ford Falcon (AU)	1:43.9323
3	1	(Australia) Mark Skaife	Holden Racing Team	Holden Commodore (VX)	1:44.0137
4	00	(Australia) Craig Lowndes	00 Motorsport	Ford Falcon (AU)	1:44.2079
5	34	(Australia) Garth Tander	Garry Rogers Motorsport	Holden Commodore (VX)	1:44.3727
6	8	(Australia) Russell Ingall	Perkins Engineering	Holden Commodore (VX)	1:44.4332
7	17	(Australia) Steven Johnson	Dick Johnson Racing	Ford Falcon (AU)	1:44.4876
8	51	(New Zealand) Greg Murphy	Tom Walkinshaw Racing Australia	Holden Commodore (VX)	1:44.5344
9	65	(Brazil) Max Wilson	Briggs Motorsport	Ford Falcon (AU)	1:44.6848
10	16	(New Zealand) Steven Richards	Perkins Engineering	Holden Commodore (VX)	1:44.6928
11	15	(Australia) Todd Kelly	Tom Walkinshaw Racing Australia	Holden Commodore (VX)	1:44.7090
12	9	(Australia) David Besnard	Stone Brothers Racing	Ford Falcon (AU)	1:44.7612
13	27	(Australia) Neil Crompton	00 Motorsport	Ford Falcon (AU)	1:44.7970
14	5	(Australia) Glenn Seton	Glenn Seton Racing	Ford Falcon (AU)	1:44.8107
15	888	(Australia) John Bowe	Brad Jones Racing	Ford Falcon (AU)	1:44.8277
16	18	(New Zealand) Paul Radisich	Dick Johnson Racing	Ford Falcon (AU)	1:44.9624
17	11	(Australia) Larry Perkins	Perkins Engineering	Holden Commodore (VX)	1:44.9786
18	10	(Australia) Mark Larkham	Larkham Motorsport	Ford Falcon (AU)	1:45.1173
19	02	(Australia) Rick Kelly	Holden Young Lions	Holden Commodore (VX)	1:45.1255
20	43	(Australia) Paul Weel	Paul Weel Racing	Ford Falcon (AU)	1:45.1719
21	600	(New Zealand) Simon Wills	Briggs Motorsport	Ford Falcon (AU)	1:45.2256
22	31	(Australia) Steven Ellery	Steven Ellery Racing	Ford Falcon (AU)	1:45.2584
23	3	(Australia) Cameron McConville	Lansvale Racing Team	Holden Commodore (VX)	1:45.3069
24	66	(Australia) Tony Longhurst	Briggs Motorsport	Ford Falcon (AU)	1:45.4021
25	21	(Australia) Brad Jones	Brad Jones Racing	Ford Falcon (AU)	1:45.5332
26	75	(Australia) Anthony Tratt	Paul Little Racing	Ford Falcon (AU)	1:45.5476
27	40	(Australia) Cameron McLean	Paragon Motorsport	Ford Falcon (AU)	1:45.6111
28	54	(New Zealand) Craig Baird	Rod Nash Racing	Holden Commodore (VX)	1:45.6290
29	021	(New Zealand) Jason Richards	Team Kiwi Racing	Holden Commodore (VT)	1:45.6848
30	29	(Australia) Paul Morris	Paul Morris Motorsport	Holden Commodore (VX)	1:46.0476
31	35	(Australia) Jason Bargwanna	Garry Rogers Motorsport	Holden Commodore (VX)	1:46.1220
32	7	(Australia) Rodney Forbes	00 Motorsport	Ford Falcon (AU)	1:46.6828
33	46	(New Zealand) John Faulkner	John Faulkner Racing	Holden Commodore (VX)	1:46.9451
34	14	(Australia) Wayne Wakefield	Imrie Motorsport	Holden Commodore (VX)	1:48.4350

=== Top fifteen shootout ===
Craig Lowndes secured pole position with a time merely half a tenth faster than nearest competitor, Jason Bright. Marcos Ambrose entered the shootout as one of the favourites but heading into the bus stop, he locked the front-right tyre which forced him to stray wide and made contact with the inside tyre bundle. This inflicted damage to the front spoiler and relegated him to the bottom of the timing sheets.

Pos	No	Name	Team	Vehicle	Time
1	00	(Australia) Craig Lowndes	00 Motorsport	Ford Falcon (AU)	1:44.4035
2	2	(Australia) Jason Bright	Holden Racing Team	Holden Commodore (VX)	1:44.4646
3	51	(New Zealand) Greg Murphy	Tom Walkinshaw Racing Australia	Holden Commodore (VX)	1:44.7118
4	16	(New Zealand) Steven Richards	Perkins Engineering	Holden Commodore (VX)	1:44.9936
5	9	(Australia) David Besnard	Stone Brothers Racing	Ford Falcon (AU)	1:45.2086
6	1	(Australia) Mark Skaife	Holden Racing Team	Holden Commodore (VX)	1:45.3248
7	17	(Australia) Steven Johnson	Dick Johnson Racing	Ford Falcon (AU)	1:45.5660
8	15	(Australia) Todd Kelly	Tom Walkinshaw Racing Australia	Holden Commodore (VX)	1:45.7127
9	5	(Australia) Glenn Seton	Glenn Seton Racing	Ford Falcon (AU)	1:45.8391
10	65	(Brazil) Max Wilson	Briggs Motorsport	Ford Falcon (AU)	1:45.8524
11	8	(Australia) Russell Ingall	Perkins Engineering	Holden Commodore (VX)	1:45.8685
12	27	(Australia) Neil Crompton	00 Motorsport	Ford Falcon (AU)	1:46.0055
13	34	(Australia) Garth Tander	Garry Rogers Motorsport	Holden Commodore (VX)	1:46.2239
14	888	(Australia) John Bowe	Brad Jones Racing	Ford Falcon (AU)	1:46.2932
15	4	(Australia) Marcos Ambrose	Stone Brothers Racing	Ford Falcon (AU)	1:52.1447

=== Race 1 ===
Pos	No	Name	Team	Vehicle	Laps	Time/Retired	Grid
1	1	(Australia) Mark Skaife	Holden Racing Team	Holden Commodore (VX)	25	45:05.6630	6
2	16	(New Zealand) Steven Richards	Perkins Engineering	Holden Commodore (VX)	25	+ 2.854	4
3	15	(Australia) Todd Kelly	Tom Walkinshaw Racing Australia	Holden Commodore (VX)	25	+ 3.196	8
4	4	(Australia) Marcos Ambrose	Stone Brothers Racing	Ford Falcon (AU)	25	+ 4.335	15
5	9	(Australia) David Besnard	Stone Brothers Racing	Ford Falcon (AU)	25	+ 15.741	5
6	11	(Australia) Larry Perkins	Perkins Engineering	Holden Commodore (VX)	25	+ 27.129	17
7	34	(Australia) Garth Tander	Garry Rogers Motorsport	Holden Commodore (VX)	25	+ 27.382	13
8	18	(New Zealand) Paul Radisich	Dick Johnson Racing	Ford Falcon (AU)	25	+ 33.360	16
9	00	(Australia) Craig Lowndes	00 Motorsport	Ford Falcon (AU)	25	+ 36.828	1
10	17	(Australia) Steven Johnson	Dick Johnson Racing	Ford Falcon (AU)	25	+ 44.480	7
11	888	(Australia) John Bowe	Brad Jones Racing	Ford Falcon (AU)	25	+ 44.840	14
12	27	(Australia) Neil Crompton	00 Motorsport	Ford Falcon (AU)	25	+ 45.079	12
13	43	(Australia) Paul Weel	Paul Weel Racing	Ford Falcon (AU)	25	+ 45.873	20
14	5	(Australia) Glenn Seton	Glenn Seton Racing	Ford Falcon (AU)	25	+ 46.281	9
15	54	(New Zealand) Craig Baird	Rod Nash Racing	Holden Commodore (VX)	25	+ 46.643	28
16	2	(Australia) Jason Bright	Holden Racing Team	Holden Commodore (VX)	25	+ 47.029	2
17	21	(Australia) Brad Jones	Brad Jones Racing	Ford Falcon (AU)	25	+ 51.341	25
18	31	(Australia) Steven Ellery	Steven Ellery Racing	Ford Falcon (AU)	25	+ 51.805	22
19	600	(New Zealand) Simon Wills	Briggs Motorsport	Ford Falcon (AU)	25	+ 53.188	21
20	10	(Australia) Mark Larkham	Larkham Motorsport	Ford Falcon (AU)	25	+ 1:03.067	18
21	66	(Australia) Tony Longhurst	Briggs Motorsport	Ford Falcon (AU)	25	1:05.525	24
22	46	(New Zealand) John Faulkner	John Faulkner Racing	Holden Commodore (VX)	25	+ 1:06.796	33
23	75	(Australia) Anthony Tratt	Paul Little Racing	Ford Falcon (AU)	25	+ 1:11.958	26
24	7	(Australia) Rodney Forbes	00 Motorsport	Ford Falcon (AU)	25	+ 1:21.033	32
25	29	(Australia) Paul Morris	Paul Morris Motorsport	Holden Commodore (VX)	24	+ 1 lap	30
26	021	(New Zealand) Jason Richards	Team Kiwi Racing	Holden Commodore (VT)	24	+ 1 lap	29
27	35	(Australia) Jason Bargwanna	Garry Rogers Motorsport	Holden Commodore (VX)	23	+ 2 laps	31
28	8	(Australia) Russell Ingall	Perkins Engineering	Holden Commodore (VX)	24	+ 1 lap	11
29	40	(Australia) Cameron McLean	Paragon Motorsport	Ford Falcon (AU)	22	+ 3 laps	27
Ret	65	(Brazil) Max Wilson	Briggs Motorsport	Ford Falcon (AU)	20	Suspension	10
Ret	51	(New Zealand) Greg Murphy	Tom Walkinshaw Racing Australia	Holden Commodore (VX)	14	Alternator	3
Ret	3	(Australia) Cameron McConville	Lansvale Racing Team	Holden Commodore (VX)	13	Mechanical	23
Ret	02	(Australia) Rick Kelly	Holden Young Lions	Holden Commodore (VX)	10	Driveline	19
Ret	14	(Australia) Wayne Wakefield	Imrie Motorsport	Holden Commodore (VX)	5	Mechanical	34
Fastest Lap: Marcos Ambrose (Stone Brothers Racing) - 1:45.0180 on lap 15

=== Race 2 ===
Pos	No	Name	Team	Vehicle	Laps	Time/Retired	Grid
1	8	(Australia) Russell Ingall	Perkins Engineering	Holden Commodore (VX)	25	47:51.6151	2
2	2	(Australia) Jason Bright	Holden Racing Team	Holden Commodore (VX)	25	+ 13.024	14
3	021	(New Zealand) Jason Richards	Team Kiwi Racing	Holden Commodore (VT)	25	+ 14.275	4
4	46	(New Zealand) John Faulkner	John Faulkner Racing	Holden Commodore (VX)	25	+ 15.147	8
5	66	(Australia) Tony Longhurst	Briggs Motorsport	Ford Falcon (AU)	25	+ 15.482	9
6	4	(Australia) Marcos Ambrose	Stone Brothers Racing	Ford Falcon (AU)	25	+ 16.102	26
7	34	(Australia) Garth Tander	Garry Rogers Motorsport	Holden Commodore (VX)	25	+ 16.834	23
8	35	(Australia) Jason Bargwanna	Garry Rogers Motorsport	Holden Commodore (VX)	25	+ 17.134	3
9	16	(New Zealand) Steven Richards	Perkins Engineering	Holden Commodore (VX)	25	+ 18.051	28
10	15	(Australia) Todd Kelly	Tom Walkinshaw Racing Australia	Holden Commodore (VX)	25	+ 18.588	27
11	54	(New Zealand) Craig Baird	Rod Nash Racing	Holden Commodore (VX)	25	+ 20.388	15
12	10	(Australia) Mark Larkham	Larkham Motorsport	Ford Falcon (AU)	25	+ 21.338	10
13	1	(Australia) Mark Skaife	Holden Racing Team	Ford Falcon (AU)	25	+ 21.540	29
14	17	(Australia) Steven Johnson	Dick Johnson Racing	Ford Falcon (AU)	25	+ 25.643	20
15	9	(Australia) David Besnard	Stone Brothers Racing	Ford Falcon (AU)	25	+ 26.032	25
16	00	(Australia) Craig Lowndes	00 Motorsport	Ford Falcon (AU)	25	+ 26.208	21
17	65	(Brazil) Max Wilson	Briggs Motorsport	Ford Falcon (AU)	25	+ 34.367	30
18	11	(Australia) Larry Perkins	Perkins Engineering	Holden Commodore (VX)	25	+ 34.645	24
19	888	(Australia) John Bowe	Brad Jones Racing	Ford Falcon (AU)	25	+ 34.912	19
20	21	(Australia) Brad Jones	Brad Jones Racing	Ford Falcon (AU)	25	+ 36.001	13
21	3	(Australia) Cameron McConville	Lansvale Racing Team	Holden Commodore (VX)	25	+ 36.735	32
22	40	(Australia) Cameron McLean	Paragon Motorsport	Ford Falcon (AU)	25	+ 52.934	1
23	29	(Australia) Paul Morris	Paul Morris Motorsport	Holden Commodore (VX)	25	+ 1:16.654	5
24	27	(Australia) Neil Crompton	00 Motorsport	Ford Falcon (AU)	24	+ 1 lap	18
25	31	(Australia) Steven Ellery	Steven Ellery Racing	Ford Falcon (AU)	23	+ 2 laps	12
Ret	14	(Australia) Wayne Wakefield	Imrie Motorsport	Holden Commodore (VX)	18	Retired	34
Ret	600	(New Zealand) Simon Wills	Briggs Motorsport	Ford Falcon (AU)	17	Retired	11
Ret	43	(Australia) Paul Weel	Paul Weel Racing	Ford Falcon (AU)	10	Accident damage	17
Ret	5	(Australia) Glenn Seton	Glenn Seton Racing	Ford Falcon (AU)	6	Accident damage	16
Ret	7	(Australia) Rodney Forbes	00 Motorsport	Ford Falcon (AU)	5	Accident	6
Ret	18	(New Zealand) Paul Radisich	Dick Johnson Racing	Ford Falcon (AU)	3	Suspension	22
Ret	75	(Australia) Anthony Tratt	Paul Little Racing	Ford Falcon (AU)	2	Retired	7
Ret	02	(Australia) Rick Kelly	Holden Young Lions	Holden Commodore (VX)	2	Engine	33
Ret	51	(New Zealand) Greg Murphy	Tom Walkinshaw Racing Australia	Holden Commodore (VX)	2	Driveshaft	31
Fastest Lap: Jason Bright (Holden Racing Team) - 1:45.3325 on lap 6

=== Race 3 ===
Pos	No	Name	Team	Vehicle	Laps	Time/Retired	Grid
1	1	(Australia) Mark Skaife	Holden Racing Team	Holden Commodore (VX)	50	01:38:00.2749	4
2	15	(Australia) Todd Kelly	Tom Walkinshaw Racing Australia	Holden Commodore (VX)	50	+ 1.818	3
3	00	(Australia) Craig Lowndes	00 Motorsport	Ford Falcon (AU)	50	+ 2.147	10
4	51	(New Zealand) Greg Murphy	Tom Walkinshaw Racing Australia	Holden Commodore (VX)	50	+ 4.796	32
5	9	(Australia) David Besnard	Stone Brothers Racing	Ford Falcon (AU)	50	+ 7.843	7
6	17	(Australia) Steven Johnson	Dick Johnson Racing	Ford Falcon (AU)	50	+ 11.934	8
7	888	(Australia) John Bowe	Brad Jones Racing	Ford Falcon (AU)	50	+ 12.355	16
8	16	(New Zealand) Steven Richards	Perkins Engineering	Holden Commodore (VX)	50	+ 18.951	2
9	8	(Australia) Russell Ingall	Perkins Engineering	Holden Commodore (VX)	50	+ 20.353	14
10	021	(New Zealand) Jason Richards	Team Kiwi Racing	Holden Commodore (VT)	50	+ 20.945	15
11	66	(Australia) Tony Longhurst	Briggs Motorsport	Ford Falcon (AU)	50	+ 27.670	11
12	21	(Australia) Brad Jones	Brad Jones Racing	Ford Falcon (AU)	50	+ 28.495	20
13	54	(New Zealand) Craig Baird	Rod Nash Racing	Holden Commodore (VX)	50	+ 29.288	12
14	75	(Australia) Anthony Tratt	Paul Little Racing	Ford Falcon (AU)	50	+ 29.563	30
15	46	(New Zealand) John Faulkner	John Faulkner Racing	Holden Commodore (VX)	50	+ 30.002	13
16	27	(Australia) Neil Crompton	00 Motorsport	Ford Falcon (AU)	50	+ 35.213	19
17	35	(Australia) Jason Bargwanna	Garry Rogers Motorsport	Holden Commodore (VX)	50	+ 37.089	18
18	2	(Australia) Jason Bright	Holden Racing Team	Holden Commodore (VX)	50	+ 44.069	6
19	40	(Australia) Cameron McLean	Paragon Motorsport	Ford Falcon (AU)	50	+ 50.782	23
20	4	(Australia) Marcos Ambrose	Stone Brothers Racing	Ford Falcon (AU)	49	+ 1 lap	1
21	10	(Australia) Mark Larkham	Larkham Motorsport	Ford Falcon (AU)	49	+ 1 lap	17
22	14	(Australia) Wayne Wakefield	Imrie Motorsport	Holden Commodore (VX)	49	+ 1 lap	34
23	600	(New Zealand) Simon Wills	Briggs Motorsport	Ford Falcon (AU)	48	+ 2 laps	28
24	29	(Australia) Paul Morris	Paul Morris Motorsport	Holden Commodore (VX)	48	+ 2 laps	22
25	3	(Australia) Cameron McConville	Lansvale Racing Team	Holden Commodore (VX)	45	+ 5 laps	29
Ret	43	(Australia) Paul Weel	Paul Weel Racing	Ford Falcon (AU)	44	Accident damage	27
Ret	65	(Brazil) Max Wilson	Briggs Motorsport	Ford Falcon (AU)	43	Accident	25
Ret	5	(Australia) Glenn Seton	Glenn Seton Racing	Ford Falcon (AU)	42	Accident damage	24
Ret	11	(Australia) Larry Perkins	Perkins Engineering	Holden Commodore (VX)	39	Retired	9
Ret	31	(Australia) Steven Ellery	Steven Ellery Racing	Ford Falcon (AU)	33	Suspension	21
Ret	02	(Australia) Rick Kelly	Holden Young Lions	Holden Commodore (VX)	19	Mechanical	PL
Ret	18	(New Zealand) Paul Radisich	Dick Johnson Racing	Ford Falcon (AU)	19	Oil pressure	26
Ret	34	(Australia) Garth Tander	Garry Rogers Motorsport	Holden Commodore (VX)	15	Suspension	5
DNS	7	(Australia) Rodney Forbes	00 Motorsport	Ford Falcon (AU)		Did not start	
Fastest Lap: Mark Skaife (Holden Racing Team) - 1:44.5262 on lap 4

== Championship standings ==
Pos.	No	Driver	Team	Pts
1	1	(Australia) Mark Skaife	Holden Racing Team	1384
2	15	(Australia) Todd Kelly	Tom Walkinshaw Racing Australia	725
3	51	(New Zealand) Greg Murphy	Tom Walkinshaw Racing Australia	702
4	4	(Australia) Marcos Ambrose	Stone Brothers Racing	613
5	00	(Australia) Craig Lowndes	00 Motorsport	598
