= 2002 V8 Supercar Challenge =

2002 Supercar Championship event

(Queensland) 2002 V8 Supercar Challenge
Event Information
- Round 11 of 13 in the 2002 V8 Supercar Championship Series
- Date: 24–27 October 2002
- Location: Surfers Paradise, Queensland
- Venue: Surfers Paradise Street Circuit
- Weather: Saturday: Fine; Sunday: Rain

Results
Race 1
| Distance | 22 laps | 100 km |
| Pole position | Greg Murphy; Tom Walkinshaw Racing Australia | 1:50.7030 |
| Winner | Greg Murphy; Tom Walkinshaw Racing Australia | 49:08.0240 |
Race 2
| Distance | 22 laps | 100 km |
| Winner | Jason Bargwanna; Garry Rogers Motorsport | 52:48.4839 |
Round Results
| First | Jason Bargwanna; Garry Rogers Motorsport | 144 pts |
| Second | Craig Lowndes; 00 Motorsport | 144 pts |
| Third | Greg Murphy; Tom Walkinshaw Racing Australia | 115 pts |

The 2002 V8 Supercar Challenge (known for naming rights reasons as the 2002 Gillette V8 Supercar Challenge) was the eleventh round of the 2002 V8 Supercar Championship Series. It was the first V8 Supercar event to be held on the Gold Coast as an official championship round and was held on the weekend of 24 to 26 October at the Surfers Paradise Street Circuit in Gold Coast, Queensland. The event was run in support of the Honda Indy 300 run as part of the CART FedEx Championship Series.

Greg Murphy secured pole position and led the first race comfortably from start to finish to take victory. However, his second race was curtailed after making a wrong call on tyre strategy that left him tumbling down the order. Jason Bargwanna capitalised on this to take victory, and along with his strong finish in the first race, would take overall round honours. This marked Bargwanna and Garry Rogers Motorsport's first race and round victory since the 2000 Bathurst 1000. Craig Lowndes amassed the same points tally as Bargwanna but the latter's race victory meant Lowndes would have to settle for second. Murphy would round out the top five largely in thanks to his victory in race one.

== Background ==
The event was held on the weekend of 24 to 27 October 2002. It was the first V8 Supercar championship event to be held on the streets of the Gold Coast and consisted of two 100 km races. The V8 Supercar category had raced as part of the support package to the CART World Series since the 1990s as a non-championship affair.

Mark Skaife entered the round as the champion, having already sewn up the championship at the previous round at Bathurst.

=== Entry list ===
There were 32 drivers entered into the event with no necessitation for pre-qualifying.

Regular series competitor Paul Morris would miss this round after incurring substantial damage at the Bathurst 1000 that necessitated a rebuild of the car.

Greg Ritter would replace Steve Owen at Briggs Motorsport for this round. It would turn out to be Ritter's sole outing for the team in 2002.

== Race report ==
=== Qualifying ===
| Pos | No | Name | Team | Vehicle | Time |
|---|---|---|---|---|---|
| 1 | 34 | (Australia) Garth Tander | Garry Rogers Motorsport | Holden Commodore (VX) | 1:51.0045 |
| 2 | 888 | (Australia) John Bowe | Brad Jones Racing | Ford Falcon (AU) | 1:51.0252 |
| 3 | 2 | (Australia) Jason Bright | Holden Racing Team | Holden Commodore (VX) | 1:51.0640 |
| 4 | 51 | (New Zealand) Greg Murphy | Tom Walkinshaw Racing Australia | Holden Commodore (VX) | 1:51.1443 |
| 5 | 4 | (Australia) Marcos Ambrose | Stone Brothers Racing | Ford Falcon (AU) | 1:51.1908 |
| 6 | 1 | (Australia) Mark Skaife | Holden Racing Team | Holden Commodore (VX) | 1:51.4121 |
| 7 | 9 | (Australia) David Besnard | Stone Brothers Racing | Ford Falcon (AU) | 1:51.5839 |
| 8 | 00 | (Australia) Craig Lowndes | 00 Motorsport | Ford Falcon (AU) | 1:51.8193 |
| 9 | 65 | (Brazil) Max Wilson | Briggs Motorsport | Ford Falcon (AU) | 1:51.8337 |
| 10 | 16 | (New Zealand) Steven Richards | Perkins Engineering | Holden Commodore (VX) | 1:51.8911 |
| 11 | 21 | (Australia) Brad Jones | Brad Jones Racing | Ford Falcon (AU) | 1:52.0803 |
| 12 | 8 | (Australia) Russell Ingall | Perkins Engineering | Holden Commodore (VX) | 1:52.0811 |
| 13 | 3 | (Australia) Cameron McConville | Lansvale Racing Team | Holden Commodore (VX) | 1:52.1247 |
| 14 | 35 | (Australia) Jason Bargwanna | Garry Rogers Motorsport | Holden Commodore (VX) | 1:52.1604 |
| 15 | 43 | (Australia) Paul Weel | Paul Weel Racing | Ford Falcon (AU) | 1:52.2733 |
| 16 | 15 | (Australia) Todd Kelly | Tom Walkinshaw Racing Australia | Holden Commodore (VX) | 1:52.3339 |
| 17 | 11 | (Australia) Larry Perkins | Perkins Engineering | Holden Commodore (VX) | 1:52.3678 |
| 18 | 66 | (Australia) Tony Longhurst | Briggs Motorsport | Ford Falcon (AU) | 1:52.3959 |
| 19 | 600 | (Australia) Greg Ritter | Briggs Motorsport | Ford Falcon (AU) | 1:52.4042 |
| 20 | 31 | (Australia) Steven Ellery | Steven Ellery Racing | Ford Falcon (AU) | 1:52.4530 |
| 21 | 17 | (Australia) Steven Johnson | Dick Johnson Racing | Ford Falcon (AU) | 1:52.5459 |
| 22 | 021 | (New Zealand) Jason Richards | Team Kiwi Racing | Holden Commodore (VT) | 1:52.6466 |
| 23 | 10 | (Australia) Mark Larkham | Larkham Motorsport | Ford Falcon (AU) | 1:52.7642 |
| 24 | 54 | (New Zealand) Craig Baird | Rod Nash Racing | Holden Commodore (VX) | 1:52.9775 |
| 25 | 7 | (Australia) Rodney Forbes | 00 Motorsport | Ford Falcon (AU) | 1:53.0561 |
| 26 | 46 | (New Zealand) John Faulkner | John Faulkner Racing | Holden Commodore (VX) | 1:53.0714 |
| 27 | 27 | (Australia) Neil Crompton | 00 Motorsport | Ford Falcon (AU) | 1:53.2572 |
| 28 | 5 | (Australia) Glenn Seton | Glenn Seton Racing | Ford Falcon (AU) | 1:53.3632 |
| 29 | 40 | (Australia) Cameron McLean | Paragon Motorsport | Ford Falcon (AU) | 1:53.4109 |
| 30 | 02 | (Australia) Rick Kelly | Holden Young Lions | Holden Commodore (VX) | 1:53.5421 |
| 31 | 75 | (Australia) Anthony Tratt | Paul Little Racing | Ford Falcon (AU) | 1:55.1747 |
| - | 18 | (New Zealand) Paul Radisich | Dick Johnson Racing | Ford Falcon (AU) | no time |

=== Top ten shootout ===
| Pos | No | Name | Team | Vehicle | Time |
|---|---|---|---|---|---|
| 1 | 51 | (New Zealand) Greg Murphy | Tom Walkinshaw Racing Australia | Holden Commodore (VX) | 1:50.7030 |
| 2 | 888 | (Australia) John Bowe | Brad Jones Racing | Ford Falcon (AU) | 1:50.7612 |
| 3 | 00 | (Australia) Craig Lowndes | 00 Motorsport | Ford Falcon (AU) | 1:50.8228 |
| 4 | 1 | (Australia) Mark Skaife | Holden Racing Team | Holden Commodore (VX) | 1:50.8539 |
| 5 | 9 | (Australia) David Besnard | Stone Brothers Racing | Ford Falcon (AU) | 1:51.1620 |
| 6 | 4 | (Australia) Marcos Ambrose | Stone Brothers Racing | Ford Falcon (AU) | 1:51.3048 |
| 7 | 65 | (Brazil) Max Wilson | Briggs Motorsport | Ford Falcon (AU) | 1:51.4883 |
| 8 | 34 | (Australia) Garth Tander | Garry Rogers Motorsport | Holden Commodore (VX) | 1:51.7301 |
| 9 | 2 | (Australia) Jason Bright | Holden Racing Team | Holden Commodore (VX) | 1:51.8816 |
| 10 | 16 | (New Zealand) Steven Richards | Perkins Engineering | Holden Commodore (VX) | no time |

=== Race 1 ===
| Pos | No | Name | Team | Vehicle | Laps | Time/Retired | Grid |
|---|---|---|---|---|---|---|---|
| 1 | 51 | (New Zealand) Greg Murphy | Tom Walkinshaw Racing Australia | Holden Commodore (VX) | 22 | 49:08.0240 | 1 |
| 2 | 4 | (Australia) Marcos Ambrose | Stone Brothers Racing | Ford Falcon (AU) | 22 | + 0.700 | 6 |
| 3 | 00 | (Australia) Craig Lowndes | 00 Motorsport | Ford Falcon (AU) | 22 | + 7.436 | 3 |
| 4 | 16 | (New Zealand) Steven Richards | Perkins Engineering | Holden Commodore (VX) | 22 | + 9.901 | 10 |
| 5 | 35 | (Australia) Jason Bargwanna | Garry Rogers Motorsport | Holden Commodore (VX) | 22 | + 11.669 | 14 |
| 6 | 2 | (Australia) Jason Bright | Holden Racing Team | Holden Commodore (VX) | 22 | + 12.551 | 9 |
| 7 | 15 | (Australia) Todd Kelly | Tom Walkinshaw Racing Australia | Holden Commodore (VX) | 22 | + 13.161 | 16 |
| 8 | 65 | (Brazil) Max Wilson | Briggs Motorsport | Ford Falcon (AU) | 22 | + 15.432 | 7 |
| 9 | 43 | (Australia) Paul Weel | Paul Weel Racing | Ford Falcon (AU) | 22 | + 15.736 | 15 |
| 10 | 17 | (Australia) Steven Johnson | Dick Johnson Racing | Ford Falcon (AU) | 22 | + 16.236 | 21 |
| 11 | 31 | (Australia) Steven Ellery | Steven Ellery Racing | Ford Falcon (AU) | 22 | + 16.646 | 20 |
| 12 | 3 | (Australia) Cameron McConville | Lansvale Racing Team | Holden Commodore (VX) | 22 | + 16.980 | 13 |
| 13 | 11 | (Australia) Larry Perkins | Perkins Engineering | Holden Commodore (VX) | 22 | + 17.563 | 17 |
| 14 | 021 | (New Zealand) Jason Richards | Team Kiwi Racing | Holden Commodore (VT) | 22 | + 19.874 | 22 |
| 15 | 18 | (New Zealand) Paul Radisich | Dick Johnson Racing | Ford Falcon (AU) | 22 | + 20.046 | 32 |
| 16 | 34 | (Australia) Garth Tander | Garry Rogers Motorsport | Holden Commodore (VX) | 22 | + 21.531 | 8 |
| 17 | 66 | (Australia) Tony Longhurst | Briggs Motorsport | Ford Falcon (AU) | 22 | + 21.852 | 18 |
| 18 | 46 | (New Zealand) John Faulkner | John Faulkner Racing | Holden Commodore (VX) | 22 | + 23.180 | 26 |
| 19 | 40 | (Australia) Cameron McLean | Paragon Motorsport | Ford Falcon (AU) | 22 | + 26.000 | 29 |
| 20 | 75 | (Australia) Anthony Tratt | Paul Little Racing | Ford Falcon (AU) | 22 | + 28.434 | 31 |
| 21 | 10 | (Australia) Mark Larkham | Larkham Motorsport | Ford Falcon (AU) | 22 | + 30.206 | 23 |
| 22 | 02 | (Australia) Rick Kelly | Holden Young Lions | Holden Commodore (VX) | 22 | + 31.480 | 30 |
| 23 | 27 | (Australia) Neil Crompton | 00 Motorsport | Ford Falcon (AU) | 22 | + 33.082 | 27 |
| 24 | 1 | (Australia) Mark Skaife | Holden Racing Team | Holden Commodore (VX) | 22 | + 36.588 | 4 |
| 25 | 21 | (Australia) Brad Jones | Brad Jones Racing | Ford Falcon (AU) | 22 | + 38.647 | 11 |
| 26 | 888 | (Australia) John Bowe | Brad Jones Racing | Ford Falcon (AU) | 22 | + 46.580 | 2 |
| 27 | 7 | (Australia) Rodney Forbes | 00 Motorsport | Ford Falcon (AU) | 22 | + 47.958 | 25 |
| 28 | 5 | (Australia) Glenn Seton | Glenn Seton Racing | Ford Falcon (AU) | 22 | + 1:09.553 | 28 |
| 29 | 600 | (Australia) Greg Ritter | Briggs Motorsport | Ford Falcon (AU) | 20 | + 2 laps | 19 |
| Ret | 54 | (New Zealand) Craig Baird | Rod Nash Racing | Holden Commodore (VX) | 18 | Retired | 24 |
| Ret | 8 | (Australia) Russell Ingall | Perkins Engineering | Holden Commodore (VX) | 11 | Accident | 12 |
| Ret | 9 | (Australia) David Besnard | Stone Brothers Racing | Ford Falcon (AU) | 1 | Accident damage | 5 |
Fastest Lap: Marcos Ambrose (Stone Brothers Racing) - 1:51.6490 on lap 4

=== Race 2 ===
| Pos | No | Name | Team | Vehicle | Laps | Time/Retired | Grid |
|---|---|---|---|---|---|---|---|
| 1 | 35 | (Australia) Jason Bargwanna | Garry Rogers Motorsport | Holden Commodore (VX) | 22 | 52:48.4839 | 5 |
| 2 | 00 | (Australia) Craig Lowndes | 00 Motorsport | Ford Falcon (AU) | 22 | + 4.562 | 3 |
| 3 | 15 | (Australia) Todd Kelly | Tom Walkinshaw Racing Australia | Holden Commodore (VX) | 22 | + 6.314 | 7 |
| 4 | 34 | (Australia) Garth Tander | Garry Rogers Motorsport | Holden Commodore (VX) | 22 | + 12.764 | 16 |
| 5 | 66 | (Australia) Tony Longhurst | Briggs Motorsport | Ford Falcon (AU) | 22 | + 13.583 | 17 |
| 6 | 18 | (New Zealand) Paul Radisich | Dick Johnson Racing | Ford Falcon (AU) | 22 | + 17.343 | 15 |
| 7 | 16 | (New Zealand) Steven Richards | Perkins Engineering | Holden Commodore (VX) | 22 | + 18.627 | 4 |
| 8 | 021 | (New Zealand) Jason Richards | Team Kiwi Racing | Holden Commodore (VT) | 22 | + 18.836 | 14 |
| 9 | 9 | (Australia) David Besnard | Stone Brothers Racing | Ford Falcon (AU) | 22 | + 25.192 | 32 |
| 10 | 17 | (Australia) Steven Johnson | Dick Johnson Racing | Ford Falcon (AU) | 22 | + 26.010 | 10 |
| 11 | 2 | (Australia) Jason Bright | Holden Racing Team | Holden Commodore (VX) | 22 | + 29.224 | 6 |
| 12 | 54 | (New Zealand) Craig Baird | Rod Nash Racing | Holden Commodore (VX) | 22 | + 29.923 | 30 |
| 13 | 27 | (Australia) Neil Crompton | 00 Motorsport | Ford Falcon (AU) | 22 | + 31.399 | 23 |
| 14 | 40 | (Australia) Cameron McLean | Paragon Motorsport | Ford Falcon (AU) | 22 | + 32.572 | 19 |
| 15 | 888 | (Australia) John Bowe | Brad Jones Racing | Ford Falcon (AU) | 22 | + 34.520 | 26 |
| 16 | 75 | (Australia) Anthony Tratt | Paul Little Racing | Ford Falcon (AU) | 22 | + 38.981 | 20 |
| 17 | 11 | (Australia) Larry Perkins | Perkins Engineering | Holden Commodore (VX) | 22 | + 43.269 | 13 |
| 18 | 51 | (New Zealand) Greg Murphy | Tom Walkinshaw Racing Australia | Holden Commodore (VX) | 22 | + 46.387 | 1 |
| 19 | 3 | (Australia) Cameron McConville | Lansvale Racing Team | Holden Commodore (VX) | 22 | + 53.318 | 12 |
| 20 | 43 | (Australia) Paul Weel | Paul Weel Racing | Ford Falcon (AU) | 22 | + 1:02.362 | 9 |
| 21 | 5 | (Australia) Glenn Seton | Glenn Seton Racing | Ford Falcon (AU) | 22 | + 1:02.988 | 28 |
| 22 | 10 | (Australia) Mark Larkham | Larkham Motorsport | Ford Falcon (AU) | 22 | + 1:15.873 | 21 |
| 23 | 7 | (Australia) Rodney Forbes | 00 Motorsport | Ford Falcon (AU) | 22 | + 1:43.532 | 27 |
| 24 | 600 | (Australia) Greg Ritter | Briggs Motorsport | Ford Falcon (AU) | 21 | + 1 lap | 29 |
| Ret | 31 | (Australia) Steven Ellery | Steven Ellery Racing | Ford Falcon (AU) | 10 | Retired | 11 |
| Ret | 21 | (Australia) Brad Jones | Brad Jones Racing | Ford Falcon (AU) | 9 | Retired | 25 |
| Ret | 65 | (Brazil) Max Wilson | Briggs Motorsport | Ford Falcon (AU) | 7 | Retired | 8 |
| Ret | 02 | (Australia) Rick Kelly | Holden Young Lions | Holden Commodore (VX) | 4 | Retired | 22 |
| Ret | 1 | (Australia) Mark Skaife | Holden Racing Team | Holden Commodore (VX) | 4 | Misfire | 24 |
| Ret | 4 | (Australia) Marcos Ambrose | Stone Brothers Racing | Ford Falcon (AU) | 3 | Retired | 2 |
| Ret | 46 | (New Zealand) John Faulkner | John Faulkner Racing | Holden Commodore (VX) | 0 | Retired | 18 |
| DNS | 8 | (Australia) Russell Ingall | Perkins Engineering | Holden Commodore (VX) | | Did not start | |
Fastest Lap: Garth Tander (Garry Rogers Motorsport) - 2:08.3526 on lap 10

== Championship points ==
Round points tally

| Pos. | No | Driver | Team | Pts |
|---|---|---|---|---|
| 1 | 35 | (Australia) Jason Bargwanna | Garry Rogers Motorsport | 144 |
| 2 | 00 | (Australia) Craig Lowndes | 00 Motorsport | 144 |
| 3 | 51 | (New Zealand) Greg Murphy | Tom Walkinshaw Racing Australia | 115 |
| 4 | 15 | (Australia) Todd Kelly | Tom Walkinshaw Racing Australia | 100 |
| 5 | 16 | (New Zealand) Steven Richards | Perkins Engineering | 88 |

Drivers' Championship standings

| Pos. | No | Driver | Team | Pts |
|---|---|---|---|---|
| 1 | 1 | (Australia) Mark Skaife | Holden Racing Team | 1984 |
| 2 | 2 | (Australia) Jason Bright | Holden Racing Team | 1290 |
| 2 | 51 | (New Zealand) Greg Murphy | Tom Walkinshaw Racing Australia | 1217 |
| 3 | 16 | (New Zealand) Steven Richards | Perkins Engineering | 1199 |
| 5 | 15 | (Australia) Todd Kelly | Tom Walkinshaw Racing Australia | 1146 |
