= Canberra 400 =

Coordinates: 35°18′9″S 149°7′33″E

(Australian Capital Territory) Canberra 400

- Race Information
Venue	Canberra Street Circuit
Number of times held	3
First held	2000
Last held	2002
- Race Format
- Race 1
Laps	25
Distance	100 km
- Race 2
Laps	25
Distance	100 km
- Race 3
Laps	50
Distance	200 km
- Last Event (2002)
- Overall Winner
(Australia) Mark Skaife	Holden Racing Team
- Race Winners
(Australia) Mark Skaife	Holden Racing Team
(Australia) Russell Ingall	Perkins Engineering
(Australia) Mark Skaife	Holden Racing Team

The Canberra 400 was a V8 Supercars event on the Canberra Street Circuit in Canberra, Australian Capital Territory, Australia. The race only had a short life, running from 2000 to 2002 over the Queen's Birthday holiday weekend in June.

== Background ==
The inaugural race, titled the GMC 400 for sponsorship reasons, was staged in Canberra for the first time in 2000. This came after what was then known as the Shell Championship Series and its governing body AVESCO offered Canberra a five-year opportunity to stage a round of the V8 Supercars. In the initial stages, the race was known as the National Capital 100. The race was to be run inside the Parliamentary Triangle which created some debate in the media about the appropriateness of the event for Canberra in general, and for the zone in particular. In 1999 the then Chief Minister of the Australian Capital Territory, Kate Carnell put forward the idea to the ACT Legislative Assembly based on the success of the Adelaide 500. The Assembly voted to stage the event, with the only opposition coming from the Greens Party who believed that the race would create both air and noise pollution.

The Assembly voted to appropriate A$4.5million in capital works and A$2.5million for recurrent expenditure over five years to operate the event. This included the creation and removal of the concrete barriers that lined the circuit. Canberra Tourism and Events Corporation (CTEC) were given the responsibility of delivering the GMC 400 on time and within budget.

== History ==
The inaugural race in 2000 saw Greg Murphy win for Gibson Motorsport. His team-mate Steven Richards would eventually win the round, despite not winning any of the three races. The event introduced a full reverse grid race to the category for the first time, with the results of race 1 being reversed to form the grid for race 2. The inaugural reverse grid race on Saturday was won by Todd Kelly, his first race win in the series, and the first for the Holden Young Lions team. Craig Lowndes won the double-points Sunday race ahead of his teammate Mark Skaife. 2001 saw Steven Johnson for Dick Johnson Racing take his first ever round win. The final running of the event in 2002 was won by Mark Skaife - the designer of the track layout itself. The round win was Skaife's fifth round win out of five to start the 2002 season.

== Circuit ==
The layout, which was inside the Parliamentary Triangle in Canberra, was notable for passing several major landmarks in the city. This included both the current Parliament House and Old Parliament House, the National Library of Australia and the Treasury Building. The layout was designed by Mark Skaife.

The outright lap record for the Canberra Street Circuit was set on 10 June 2000 when Simon Wills drove his Reynard 94D Formula Holden around the 3.9 km track in 1:39.5409. The V8 Supercars lap record was set by Craig Lowndes in 2001, a 1:43.8397.

== Format ==
The Canberra 400 was run over three days, from Friday to Sunday. Friday started out with two 45 minute practice sessions for the V8 Supercars. Later, the cars took to the track for Qualifying, which consisted of two sessions, the lower 50% and the upper 50%. Drivers were split into two groups which were determined by times from both practice sessions earlier in the day. The best times from both sessions were added together. The top 15 would go into the Top 15 Shootout, while 16th place onwards would start Race 1 in those positions.

Saturday saw the Top 15 Shootout in which the top 15 cars from Qualifying would do one 'hot lap' of the circuit. Later in the day, cars would grid up for the 25 lap (100 km) Race 1. During this race the cars must make a compulsory tyre stop between Laps 2 and 20. Pitstops during the races in Canberra were usually somewhat of a procession, in that most if not all cars came in at the same time, usually on lap 3. This would result in a crowded pitlane where the possibility of an accident occurring was very high. The cause of most cars coming in so early was the safety car. During these races if the safety car was brought onto the track, the pitlane would close. This meant that cars would not be able to enter to make a pitstop. Drivers were worried that a safety car would appear sometime during the race and if they had not made a pitstop yet, they would drop to the back of the drivers who had made a pitstop. CAMS and AVESCO realised that this could cause an accident, so for the 2001 race, they changed the pitlane speed limit from 60 km/h to 40 km/h and introduced an electronic speed limiter to all cars.

Sunday morning saw the 25 lap (100 km) Race 2 and the first 'reverse grid' ever to be used in V8 Supercar racing. A reverse grid means the car that finished in first place in Race 1 would start last in Race 2 and the car that finished last in Race 1 would start first in Race 2. Those cars that Did Not Finish (DNF) start from the rear of grid. The introduction of the reverse grid was to create overtaking from faster cars at the back to slower cars at the front, which would be entertaining to the viewers. The problem with a reverse grid, especially on a street circuit is the high possibility of cars getting damaged from fast cars trying to overtake slow cars. Race 2 saw the same tyre stop rules that were applied in Race 1.

Race 3 was a 50 lap (200 km) and started late on Sunday afternoon. The grid for Race 3 was decided by adding the points awarded in Race 1 with the points awarded in Race 2. Race 3 not only had a tyre stop between laps 2 and 40, but also a fuel stop. This meant that all cars had to enter and stop in pitlane and have their cars filled up with petrol also between laps 2 and 40. The driver to have the most points at the end of the weekend is the winner of the Canberra 400.

== Demise ==
The Canberra 400 only lasted 3 of its 5-year contract. Gary Humphries' Liberal Government was replaced in 2001 by Jon Stanhope's Labor Government. The new Chief Minister allowed the race to run in 2002, but decided to pull the plug for the 2003 race. The main reason given for the cancellation of the contract was the amount of money being spent on the race. Kate Carnell's initial estimation on cost blew out as the years went on, and some Canberrans believed that this money was better spent elsewhere. The race was not making as much money as had been expected. A report by the Auditor General of the Australian Capital Territory in 2002 summarised that the benefits or the race were overstated and costs were underestimated.

While the hotel industry experienced a rise in bookings compared to a typical June, the crowd at the track dropped from 101,000 in 2000 to 89,000 in 2002. This was put down to the time of year and the weather (Canberra in June can reach temperatures of lower than 5°C during the day). This view was supported by V8 Supercars chairman Tony Cochrane who later conceded that the timing of the event, as requested by the ACT Government, was a mistake. There was talk about moving the race to a warmer part of the year, but it never materialised. Some businessmen in the Canberra district of Tuggeranong even designed their own layout for the V8 Supercars to run on around the Tuggeranong Town Centre, in an effort to boost business, but this also never eventuated. A proposal in 2021 suggested that a new circuit could be built at the Exhibition Park in Canberra, which already hosts the Summernats car festival.

Today there are still reminders of the V8's short history in Canberra with painted racing lines, including the starting grid, still visible on the narrow yet challenging roads they raced on. The starting grid in particular, located along Langford Crescent and in front of the Treasury building, was still in place up until 2017, when resurfacing works took place, removing the grid and the yellow track limit area.

== Winners ==
Year	Driver	Team	Car	Report
2000	(New Zealand) Steven Richards	Gibson Motorsport	Holden Commodore (VT)	Report
2001	(Australia) Steven Johnson	Dick Johnson Racing	Ford Falcon (AU)	Report
2002	(Australia) Mark Skaife	Holden Racing Team	Holden Commodore (VX)	Report

== Multiple winners ==
=== By manufacturer ===
Wins	Manufacturer
2	Holden
1	Ford

== Event names and sponsors ==
- 2000–01: GMC 400
- 2002: Stegbar 400

== See also ==
- List of Australian Touring Car Championship races
