= 2002 V8 Supercars Oran Park round =

2002 sports event

(New South Wales) 2002 V8 Supercars Oran Park round
Event Information
- Round 7 of 13 in the 2002 V8 Supercar Championship Series
- Date: 26–28 July 2002
- Location: Sydney, New South Wales
- Venue: Oran Park Raceway
- Weather: Fine

Results
Race 1
Distance	58 laps	150 km
Pole position	Marcos Ambrose; Stone Brothers Racing	1:08.8177
Winner	Mark Skaife; Holden Racing Team	1:19:50.4404
Race 2
Distance	58 laps	150 km
Winner	Mark Skaife; Holden Racing Team	1:12:28.4745
Round Results
First	Mark Skaife; Holden Racing Team	200 pts
Second	Jason Bright; Holden Racing Team	144 pts
Third	Marcos Ambrose; Stone Brothers Racing	132 pts

The 2002 V8 Supercars Oran Park round was the seventh round of the 2002 V8 Supercar Championship Series. It was the 32nd ATCC/V8 Supercar event to be held at Oran Park and was held on the weekend of 26 to 28 July at the Oran Park Raceway in Narellan, New South Wales.

Mark Skaife continued his domination of the championship series by winning both races of the weekend and claiming overall round honours in the process. Marcos Ambrose and Craig Lowndes had shown pace for the Ford brand but a comibination of slow pitstops and technical issues curtailed their efforts. A surprise package throughout the weekend was Cameron McConville of the Lansvale Racing Team who topped the first practice session and was on course for a podium in race one before a power steering failure forced him to retire.

== Background ==
The event was held on the weekend of 26 to 28 July 2002. It was the 32nd ATCC/V8 Supercar event to be held at Oran Park and consisted of two 150 km races with compulsory pitstops.

Mark Skaife entered the round as the championship leader in what had been a dominant campaign, having won all five of the six rounds run thus far.

=== Entry list ===
There were 36 drivers entered into the event with no necessitation for pre-qualifying.

Multiple drivers returned to the series for this round including Larry Perkins, Wayne Wakefield with Imrie Motorsport, Paul Romano and Dugal McDougall.

== Race report ==
=== Qualifying ===
Series debutant Max Wilson had continued his strong qualifying form by securing his first provisional pole position in the V8 Supercar series. Jason Richards qualified in tenth position and thus secured Team Kiwi Racing's first top ten shootout berth in its history.

Pos	No	Name	Team	Vehicle	Time
1	65	(Brazil) Max Wilson	Briggs Motorsport	Ford Falcon (AU)	1:09.0234
2	4	(Australia) Marcos Ambrose	Stone Brothers Racing	Ford Falcon (AU)	1:09.0559
3	2	(Australia) Jason Bright	Holden Racing Team	Holden Commodore (VX)	1:09.1198
4	1	(Australia) Mark Skaife	Holden Racing Team	Holden Commodore (VX)	1:09.2309
5	3	(Australia) Cameron McConville	Lansvale Racing Team	Holden Commodore (VX)	1:09.2778
6	34	(Australia) Garth Tander	Garry Rogers Motorsport	Holden Commodore (VX)	1:09.2841
7	5	(Australia) Glenn Seton	Glenn Seton Racing	Ford Falcon (AU)	1:09.2974
8	8	(Australia) Russell Ingall	Perkins Engineering	Holden Commodore (VX)	1:09.3287
9	00	(Australia) Craig Lowndes	00 Motorsport	Ford Falcon (AU)	1:09.3738
10	021	(New Zealand) Jason Richards	Team Kiwi Racing	Holden Commodore (VT)	1:09.3839
11	17	(Australia) Steven Johnson	Dick Johnson Racing	Ford Falcon (AU)	1:09.4016
12	888	(Australia) John Bowe	Brad Jones Racing	Ford Falcon (AU)	1:09.4311
13	9	(Australia) David Besnard	Stone Brothers Racing	Ford Falcon (AU)	1:09.4425
14	15	(Australia) Todd Kelly	Tom Walkinshaw Racing Australia	Holden Commodore (VX)	1:09.4446
15	54	(New Zealand) Craig Baird	Rod Nash Racing	Holden Commodore (VX)	1:09.4702
16	51	(New Zealand) Greg Murphy	Tom Walkinshaw Racing Australia	Holden Commodore (VX)	1:09.5042
17	40	(Australia) Cameron McLean	Paragon Motorsport	Ford Falcon (AU)	1:09.5062
18	16	(New Zealand) Steven Richards	Perkins Engineering	Holden Commodore (VX)	1:09.5902
19	31	(Australia) Steven Ellery	Steven Ellery Racing	Ford Falcon (AU)	1:09.6215
20	600	(New Zealand) Simon Wills	Briggs Motorsport	Ford Falcon (AU)	1:09.6260
21	10	(Australia) Mark Larkham	Larkham Motorsport	Ford Falcon (AU)	1:09.6367
22	21	(Australia) Brad Jones	Brad Jones Racing	Ford Falcon (AU)	1:09.6394
23	24	(Australia) Paul Romano	Romano Racing	Holden Commodore (VX)	1:09.8045
24	35	(Australia) Jason Bargwanna	Garry Rogers Motorsport	Holden Commodore (VX)	1:09.8158
25	29	(Australia) Paul Morris	Paul Morris Motorsport	Holden Commodore (VX)	1:09.8202
26	27	(Australia) Neil Crompton	00 Motorsport	Ford Falcon (AU)	1:09.8251
27	18	(New Zealand) Paul Radisich	Dick Johnson Racing	Ford Falcon (AU)	1:09.8969
28	02	(Australia) Rick Kelly	Holden Young Lions	Holden Commodore (VX)	1:09.9045
29	66	(Australia) Tony Longhurst	Briggs Motorsport	Ford Falcon (AU)	1:09.9054
30	46	(New Zealand) John Faulkner	John Faulkner Racing	Holden Commodore (VX)	1:09.9523
31	43	(Australia) Paul Weel	Paul Weel Racing	Ford Falcon (AU)	1:09.9673
32	11	(Australia) Larry Perkins	Perkins Engineering	Holden Commodore (VX)	1:10.0601
33	75	(Australia) Anthony Tratt	Paul Little Racing	Ford Falcon (AU)	1:10.1053
34	7	(Australia) Rodney Forbes	00 Motorsport	Ford Falcon (AU)	1:10.1117
35	14	(Australia) Wayne Wakefield	Imrie Motorsport	Holden Commodore (VX)	1:10.2802
36	22	(Australia) Dugal McDougall	McDougall Motorsport	Holden Commodore (VX)	1:12.8343

=== Top ten shootout ===
Pos	No	Name	Team	Vehicle	Time
1	4	(Australia) Marcos Ambrose	Stone Brothers Racing	Ford Falcon (AU)	1:08.8177
2	2	(Australia) Jason Bright	Holden Racing Team	Holden Commodore (VX)	1:09.0350
3	00	(Australia) Craig Lowndes	00 Motorsport	Ford Falcon (AU)	1:09.6288
4	1	(Australia) Mark Skaife	Holden Racing Team	Holden Commodore (VX)	1:09.7731
5	3	(Australia) Cameron McConville	Lansvale Racing Team	Holden Commodore (VX)	1:09.7741
6	34	(Australia) Garth Tander	Garry Rogers Motorsport	Holden Commodore (VX)	1:09.8390
7	5	(Australia) Glenn Seton	Glenn Seton Racing	Ford Falcon (AU)	1:09.8748
8	8	(Australia) Russell Ingall	Perkins Engineering	Holden Commodore (VX)	1:09.8808
9	65	(Brazil) Max Wilson	Briggs Motorsport	Ford Falcon (AU)	1:09.9801
10	021	(New Zealand) Jason Richards	Team Kiwi Racing	Holden Commodore (VT)	1:10.5160

=== Race 1 ===
Pos	No	Name	Team	Vehicle	Laps	Time/Retired	Grid
1	1	(Australia) Mark Skaife	Holden Racing Team	Holden Commodore (VX)	58	01:19:50.4404	4
2	2	(Australia) Jason Bright	Holden Racing Team	Holden Commodore (VX)	58	+ 1.106	2
3	16	(New Zealand) Steven Richards	Perkins Engineering	Holden Commodore (VX)	58	+ 1.932	18
4	4	(Australia) Marcos Ambrose	Stone Brothers Racing	Ford Falcon (AU)	58	+ 2.183	1
5	8	(Australia) Russell Ingall	Perkins Engineering	Holden Commodore (VX)	58	+ 2.508	8
6	31	(Australia) Steven Ellery	Steven Ellery Racing	Ford Falcon (AU)	58	+ 3.646	19
7	27	(Australia) Neil Crompton	00 Motorsport	Ford Falcon (AU)	58	+ 5.256	26
8	02	(Australia) Rick Kelly	Holden Young Lions	Holden Commodore (VX)	58	+ 5.433	28
9	5	(Australia) Glenn Seton	Glenn Seton Racing	Ford Falcon (AU)	58	+ 5.788	PL
10	34	(Australia) Garth Tander	Garry Rogers Motorsport	Holden Commodore (VX)	58	+ 8.052	6
11	66	(Australia) Tony Longhurst	Briggs Motorsport	Ford Falcon (AU)	58	+ 8.668	29
12	00	(Australia) Craig Lowndes	00 Motorsport	Ford Falcon (AU)	58	+ 8.920	3
13	18	(New Zealand) Paul Radisich	Dick Johnson Racing	Ford Falcon (AU)	58	+ 9.649	27
14	29	(Australia) Paul Morris	Paul Morris Motorsport	Holden Commodore (VX)	58	+ 9.702	25
15	600	(New Zealand) Simon Wills	Briggs Motorsport	Ford Falcon (AU)	58	+ 10.177	20
16	46	(New Zealand) John Faulkner	John Faulkner Racing	Holden Commodore (VX)	58	+ 11.558	30
17	54	(New Zealand) Craig Baird	Rod Nash Racing	Holden Commodore (VX)	58	+ 11.563	15
18	021	(New Zealand) Jason Richards	Team Kiwi Racing	Holden Commodore (VT)	58	+ 13.264	PL
19	9	(Australia) David Besnard	Stone Brothers Racing	Ford Falcon (AU)	58	+ 13.839	13
20	11	(Australia) Larry Perkins	Perkins Engineering	Holden Commodore (VX)	58	+ 13.934	32
21	24	(Australia) Paul Romano	Romano Racing	Holden Commodore (VX)	58	+ 15.111	23
22	14	(Australia) Wayne Wakefield	Imrie Motorsport	Holden Commodore (VX)	58	+ 15.395	35
23	75	(Australia) Anthony Tratt	Paul Little Racing	Ford Falcon (AU)	58	+ 16.896	33
24	65	(Brazil) Max Wilson	Briggs Motorsport	Ford Falcon (AU)	58	+ 17.639	9
25	17	(Australia) Steven Johnson	Dick Johnson Racing	Ford Falcon (AU)	58	+ 18.791	11
26	40	(Australia) Cameron McLean	Paragon Motorsport	Ford Falcon (AU)	57	+ 1 lap	17
27	10	(Australia) Mark Larkham	Larkham Motorsport	Ford Falcon (AU)	57	+ 1 lap	21
28	21	(Australia) Brad Jones	Brad Jones Racing	Ford Falcon (AU)	56	+ 2 laps	22
Ret	35	(Australia) Jason Bargwanna	Garry Rogers Motorsport	Holden Commodore (VX)	55	Accident damage	24
Ret	22	(Australia) Dugal McDougall	McDougall Motorsport	Holden Commodore (VX)	44	Mechanical	36
Ret	888	(Australia) John Bowe	Brad Jones Racing	Ford Falcon (AU)	42	Accident damage	12
Ret	15	(Australia) Todd Kelly	Tom Walkinshaw Racing Australia	Holden Commodore (VX)	41	Power steering	14
Ret	51	(New Zealand) Greg Murphy	Tom Walkinshaw Racing Australia	Holden Commodore (VX)	32	Steering	16
Ret	43	(Australia) Paul Weel	Paul Weel Racing	Ford Falcon (AU)	26	Accident	31
Ret	7	(Australia) Rodney Forbes	00 Motorsport	Ford Falcon (AU)	26	Accident	34
Ret	3	(Australia) Cameron McConville	Lansvale Racing Team	Holden Commodore (VX)	14	Power steering	5
Fastest Lap: Marcos Ambrose (Stone Brothers Racing) - 1:09.2530 on lap 2

=== Race 2 ===
Pos	No	Name	Team	Vehicle	Laps	Time/Retired	Grid
1	1	(Australia) Mark Skaife	Holden Racing Team	Holden Commodore (VX)	58	01:12:28.4745	1
2	4	(Australia) Marcos Ambrose	Stone Brothers Racing	Ford Falcon (AU)	58	+ 15.276	4
3	2	(Australia) Jason Bright	Holden Racing Team	Holden Commodore (VX)	58	+ 18.814	2
4	16	(New Zealand) Steven Richards	Perkins Engineering	Holden Commodore (VX)	58	+ 20.506	3
5	8	(Australia) Russell Ingall	Perkins Engineering	Holden Commodore (VX)	58	+ 24.361	5
6	9	(Australia) David Besnard	Stone Brothers Racing	Ford Falcon (AU)	58	+ 31.759	19
7	00	(Australia) Craig Lowndes	00 Motorsport	Ford Falcon (AU)	58	+ 32.221	12
8	31	(Australia) Steven Ellery	Steven Ellery Racing	Ford Falcon (AU)	58	+ 36.511	6
9	34	(Australia) Garth Tander	Garry Rogers Motorsport	Holden Commodore (VX)	58	+ 40.610	10
10	27	(Australia) Neil Crompton	00 Motorsport	Ford Falcon (AU)	58	+ 47.162	7
11	66	(Australia) Tony Longhurst	Briggs Motorsport	Ford Falcon (AU)	58	+ 54.757	11
12	888	(Australia) John Bowe	Brad Jones Racing	Ford Falcon (AU)	58	+ 55.338	PL
13	5	(Australia) Glenn Seton	Glenn Seton Racing	Ford Falcon (AU)	58	+ 56.379	9
14	3	(Australia) Cameron McConville	Lansvale Racing Team	Holden Commodore (VX)	58	+ 56.854	36
15	02	(Australia) Rick Kelly	Holden Young Lions	Holden Commodore (VX)	58	+ 1:04.308	8
16	75	(Australia) Anthony Tratt	Paul Little Racing	Ford Falcon (AU)	57	+ 1 lap	23
17	600	(New Zealand) Simon Wills	Briggs Motorsport	Ford Falcon (AU)	57	+ 1 lap	15
18	10	(Australia) Mark Larkham	Larkham Motorsport	Ford Falcon (AU)	57	+ 1 lap	27
19	46	(New Zealand) John Faulkner	John Faulkner Racing	Holden Commodore (VX)	57	+ 1 lap	16
20	18	(New Zealand) Paul Radisich	Dick Johnson Racing	Ford Falcon (AU)	57	+ 1 lap	13
21	14	(Australia) Wayne Wakefield	Imrie Motorsport	Holden Commodore (VX)	57	+ 1 lap	22
22	7	(Australia) Rodney Forbes	00 Motorsport	Ford Falcon (AU)	57	+ 1 lap	35
23	51	(New Zealand) Greg Murphy	Tom Walkinshaw Racing Australia	Holden Commodore (VX)	57	+ 1 lap	33
24	22	(Australia) Dugal McDougall	McDougall Motorsport	Holden Commodore (VX)	57	+ 1 lap	30
25	021	(New Zealand) Jason Richards	Team Kiwi Racing	Holden Commodore (VT)	57	+ 1 lap	18
26	40	(Australia) Cameron McLean	Paragon Motorsport	Ford Falcon (AU)	57	+ 1 lap	26
27	11	(Australia) Larry Perkins	Perkins Engineering	Holden Commodore (VX)	57	+ 1 lap	20
28	35	(Australia) Jason Bargwanna	Garry Rogers Motorsport	Holden Commodore (VX)	54	+ 4 laps	29
Ret	54	(New Zealand) Craig Baird	Rod Nash Racing	Holden Commodore (VX)	45	Retired	17
Ret	43	(Australia) Paul Weel	Paul Weel Racing	Ford Falcon (AU)	29	Retired	34
Ret	24	(Australia) Paul Romano	Romano Racing	Holden Commodore (VX)	29	Retired	21
Ret	65	(Brazil) Max Wilson	Briggs Motorsport	Ford Falcon (AU)	2	Rear wing	24
Ret	17	(Australia) Steven Johnson	Dick Johnson Racing	Ford Falcon (AU)	2	Accident damage	25
Ret	21	(Australia) Brad Jones	Brad Jones Racing	Ford Falcon (AU)	2	Accident damage	28
Ret	29	(Australia) Paul Morris	Paul Morris Motorsport	Holden Commodore (VX)	1	Power steering	14
Ret	15	(Australia) Todd Kelly	Tom Walkinshaw Racing Australia	Holden Commodore (VX)	1	Accident	32
Fastest Lap: Marcos Ambrose (Stone Brothers Racing) - 1:10.1963 on lap 11

== Championship standings ==
Pos.	No	Driver	Team	Pts
1	1	(Australia) Mark Skaife	Holden Racing Team	1693
2	2	(Australia) Jason Bright	Holden Racing Team	896
3	51	(New Zealand) Greg Murphy	Tom Walkinshaw Racing Australia	894
4	4	(Australia) Marcos Ambrose	Stone Brothers Racing	809
5	15	(Australia) Todd Kelly	Tom Walkinshaw Racing Australia	802
