= 2002 V8 Supercar Championship Series =

Motor racing competition

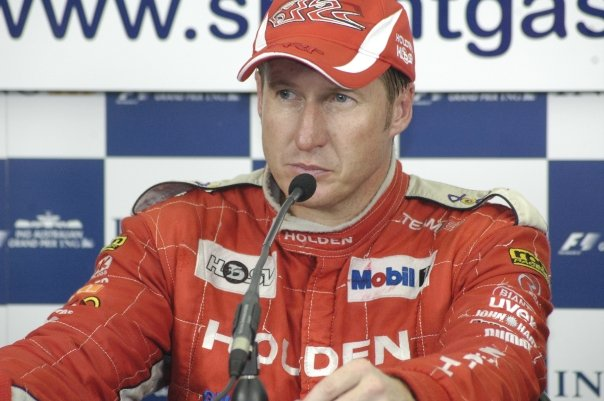
Mark Skaife became a consecutive three-times V8 Supercar Champion with Holden Racing Team.

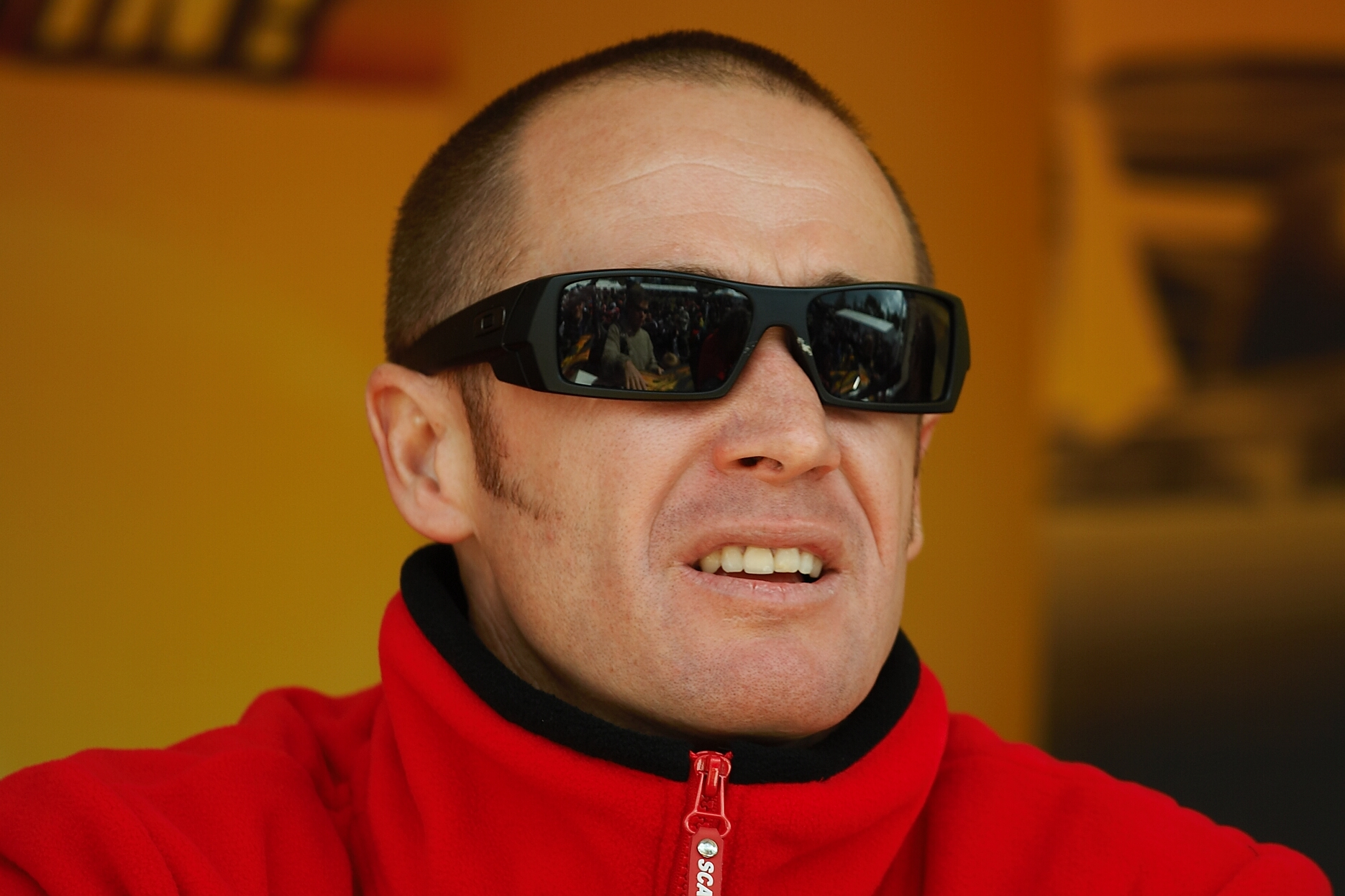
Greg Murphy finished second in the championship.

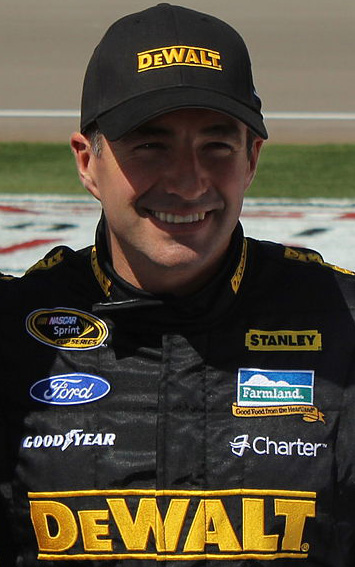
Marcos Ambrose, finished third in the championship and was the best placed Ford driver.

The 2002 V8 Supercar Championship Series was an Australian based motor racing series for V8 Supercars. It began on 15 March 2002 at the Adelaide Street Circuit and ended on 1 December at Sandown International Raceway after 13 rounds. It was the fourth V8 Supercar Championship Series but the first to carry that name, previous championships having been contested as the Shell Championship Series. The winner of the Drivers Championship, Mark Skaife, was also awarded the 43rd Australian Touring Car Championship.

== Calendar ==
The 2002 V8 Supercar Championship Series consisted of 13 rounds which included 11 sprint rounds of two or three races and two single race endurance rounds.

Rd.	Race title, Circuit	Location / State	Date
1	Adelaide 500, Adelaide Street Circuit	Adelaide, South Australia	14 – 17 March
2	Phillip Island V8 Challenge, Phillip Island Grand Prix Circuit	Phillip Island, Victoria	12 – 14 April
3	Sydney V8 Challenge, Eastern Creek Raceway	Sydney, New South Wales	26 – 28 April
4	Darwin V8 Challenge, Hidden Valley Raceway	Darwin, Northern Territory	17–19 May
5	Canberra 400, Canberra Street Circuit	Canberra, Australian Capital Territory	7–9 June
6	VB 300, Wanneroo Raceway	Perth, Western Australia	28 – 30 June
7	Oran Park Raceway	Sydney, New South Wales	26 – 28 July
8	Winton Challenge, Winton Motor Raceway	Benalla, Victoria	16 – 18 August
9	Queensland 500, Queensland Raceway	Ipswich, Queensland	13 – 15 September
10	Bathurst 1000, Mount Panorama Circuit	Bathurst, New South Wales	10 – 13 October
11	Gillette V8 Supercar Challenge, Surfers Paradise Street Circuit	Surfers Paradise, Queensland	25 – 27 October
12	Boost Mobile V8 International, Pukekohe Park Raceway	Pukekohe, Auckland Region, New Zealand	8 – 10 November
13	Betta Electrical V8 Ultimate, Sandown International Raceway	Melbourne, Victoria	29 November – 1 December

Australian rounds

New Zealand rounds

== Teams and drivers ==
The following drivers and teams competed in the 2002 series. The series consisted of 11 sprint rounds with one driver per car and two endurance rounds (the Queensland 500 and the Bathurst 1000) with each car shared by two drivers.

Manufacturer	Vehicle	Team	No.	Drivers	Events	Co-Drivers	Events
Ford	Falcon AU	00 Motorsport	00	(Australia) Craig Lowndes	All	(Australia) Neil Crompton	9–10
Ford	Falcon AU	00 Motorsport	7	(Australia) Rodney Forbes	All	(Australia) Neal Bates	9–10
Ford	Falcon AU	00 Motorsport	27	(Australia) Neil Crompton	1–8, 11–13	—N/a	
Ford	Falcon AU	Stone Brothers Racing	4	(Australia) Marcos Ambrose	All	(Australia) Paul Weel	9–10
Ford	Falcon AU	Stone Brothers Racing	9	(Australia) David Besnard	All	(New Zealand) Simon Wills	9
Ford	Falcon AU	Stone Brothers Racing	9	(Australia) David Besnard	All	(Australia) Wayne Gardner	10
Ford	Falcon AU	Glenn Seton Racing	5	(Australia) Glenn Seton	All	(Australia) Owen Kelly	9
Ford	Falcon AU	Glenn Seton Racing	5	(Australia) Glenn Seton	All	(Australia) David Besnard	10
Ford	Falcon AU	Larkham Motorsport	10	(Australia) Mark Larkham	All	(Australia) Will Power	9–10
Ford	Falcon AU	Dick Johnson Racing	17	(Australia) Steven Johnson	All	(New Zealand) Paul Radisich	9–10
Ford	Falcon AU	Dick Johnson Racing	18	(New Zealand) Paul Radisich	1–8, 11–13	—N/a	
Ford	Falcon AU	Dick Johnson Racing	18	(Australia) Alan Jones	9–10	(Australia) Greg Ritter	9–10
Ford	Falcon AU	Brad Jones Racing	21	(Australia) Brad Jones	All	(Australia) John Bowe	9–10
Ford	Falcon AU	Brad Jones Racing	888	(Australia) John Bowe	1–8, 11–13	—N/a	
Ford	Falcon AU	Brad Jones Racing	888	(United Kingdom) John Cleland	9–10	(Australia) Tim Leahey	9–10
Ford	Falcon AU	Steven Ellery Racing	31	(Australia) Steven Ellery	All	(Australia) Luke Youlden	9–10
Ford	Falcon AU	Paragon Motorsport	40	(Australia) Cameron McLean	All	(Australia) Tony Scott	9–10
Ford	Falcon AU	Paul Weel Racing	43	(Australia) Paul Weel	1–8, 11–13	—N/a	
Ford	Falcon AU	Paul Weel Racing	43	(New Zealand) Mark Porter	9–10	(Australia) Geoff Full	9–10
Ford	Falcon AU	Briggs Motor Sport	65	(Brazil) Max Wilson	All	(Australia) Dean Canto	9–10
Ford	Falcon AU	Briggs Motor Sport	66	(Australia) Tony Longhurst	All	(Australia) Matthew White	9–10
Ford	Falcon AU	Briggs Motor Sport	600	(New Zealand) Simon Wills	1–7	—N/a	
Ford	Falcon AU	Briggs Motor Sport	600	(Australia) Steve Owen	8–10	(Australia) Dale Brede	9–10
Ford	Falcon AU	Briggs Motor Sport	600	(Australia) Greg Ritter	11	—N/a	
Ford	Falcon AU	Briggs Motor Sport	600	(Australia) Dean Canto	12–13	—N/a	
Ford	Falcon AU	Paul Little Racing	75	(Australia) Anthony Tratt	1–12	(Australia) Paul Stokell	9–10
Ford	Falcon AU	Paul Little Racing	75	(Australia) Paul Stokell	13	—N/a	
Holden	Commodore VT	Team Kiwi Racing	021	(New Zealand) Jason Richards	All	(New Zealand) John McIntyre	9
Holden	Commodore VT	Team Kiwi Racing	021	(New Zealand) Jason Richards	All	(New Zealand) Simon Wills	10
Holden	Commodore VX	Holden Racing Team	1	(Australia) Mark Skaife	All	(Australia) Jason Bright	9
Holden	Commodore VX	Holden Racing Team	1	(Australia) Mark Skaife	All	(New Zealand) Jim Richards	10
Holden	Commodore VX	Holden Racing Team	2	(Australia) Jason Bright	1-8, 10-13	(Australia) Tomas Mezera	9–10
Holden	Commodore VX	Holden Racing Team	2	(New Zealand) Jim Richards	9	(Australia) Tomas Mezera	9–10
Holden	Commodore VX	Holden Young Lions (HRT)	02	(Australia) Rick Kelly	All	(Australia) Nathan Pretty	9–10
Holden	Commodore VX	Tom Walkinshaw Racing Australia (HRT)	15	(Australia) Todd Kelly	1–8, 11–13	—N/a	
Holden	Commodore VX	Tom Walkinshaw Racing Australia (HRT)	15	(France) Yvan Muller	9–10	(United Kingdom) Andy Priaulx	9–10
Holden	Commodore VX	Tom Walkinshaw Racing Australia (HRT)	51	(New Zealand) Greg Murphy	All	(Australia) Todd Kelly	9–10
Holden	Commodore VX	Lansvale Smash Repairs	3	(Australia) Cameron McConville	All	(Australia) Warren Luff	9–10
Holden	Commodore VX	Perkins Engineering	8	(Australia) Russell Ingall	1–8, 11–13	—N/a	
Holden	Commodore VX	Perkins Engineering	11	(Australia) Larry Perkins	1–5, 7–13	(Australia) Paul Dumbrell	9–10
Holden	Commodore VX	Perkins Engineering	16	(New Zealand) Steven Richards	All	(Australia) Russell Ingall	9–10
Holden	Commodore VX	Imrie Motorsport	14	(Australia) Tomas Mezera	1–2	—N/a	
Holden	Commodore VX	Imrie Motorsport	14	(Australia) Steve Owen	3	—N/a	
Holden	Commodore VX	Imrie Motorsport	14	(Australia) Stephen White	4	—N/a	
Holden	Commodore VX	Imrie Motorsport	14	(Australia) Wayne Wakefield	5, 7–8	—N/a	
Holden	Commodore VX	Imrie Motorsport	14	(Australia) Daryl Beattie	9–10	(Australia) Christian D'Agostin	9
Holden	Commodore VX	Imrie Motorsport	14	(Australia) Daryl Beattie	9–10	(Australia) Tyler Mecklem	10
Holden	Commodore VX	Imrie Motorsport	14	(New Zealand) Simon Wills	13	—N/a	
Holden	Commodore VX	McDougall Motorsport	22	(Australia) Dugal McDougall	1–3, 7–10	(Australia) Alan Gurr	9–10
Holden	Commodore VX	Romano Racing	24	(Australia) Paul Romano	1–4, 7–8	—N/a	
Holden	Commodore VX	Paul Morris Motorsport	29	(Australia) Paul Morris	1–10, 13	(Australia) Wayne Wakefield	9–10
Holden	Commodore VX	Garry Rogers Motorsport	34	(Australia) Garth Tander	All	(Australia) Jason Bargwanna	9–10
Holden	Commodore VX	Garry Rogers Motorsport	35	(Australia) Jason Bargwanna	1–8, 11–13	—N/a	
Holden	Commodore VX	Garry Rogers Motorsport	35	(Australia) Jamie Whincup	9–10	(Australia) Max Dumesny	9
Holden	Commodore VX	Garry Rogers Motorsport	35	(Australia) Jamie Whincup	9–10	(Australia) Mark Noske	10
Holden	Commodore VX	John Faulkner Racing	46	(New Zealand) John Faulkner	All	(Australia) Rick Bates	9–10
Holden	Commodore VX	Rod Nash Racing	54	(New Zealand) Craig Baird	All	(Australia) Mark Noske	9
Holden	Commodore VX	Rod Nash Racing	54	(New Zealand) Craig Baird	All	(Australia) Peter Brock	10
Wildcard Entries
Ford	Falcon AU	Brad Jones Racing	20	(Australia) Andrew Jones	10	(Australia) Matthew Coleman	10
Ford	Falcon AU	Stone Brothers Racing	36	(Australia) Wayne Gardner	1, 3–4	—N/a	
Ford	Falcon AU	Michael Simpson Racing	56	(Australia) Michael Simpson	10	(Australia) Kevin Mundy	10
Ford	Falcon AU	Halliday Motorsport	61	(Australia) Ross Halliday	1	—N/a	
Ford	Falcon AU	Halliday Motorsport	161	(Australia) Greg Crick	1, 9–10	(Australia) Phillip Scifleet	9–10
Ford	Falcon AU	Dick Johnson Racing	71	(Australia) Greg Ritter	2–3	—N/a	
Ford	Falcon AU	Nilsson Motorsport	87	(Australia) Allan Grice	10	(Australia) Ross Halliday (Australia) Peter Doulman^{1}	10
Holden	Commodore VT	Matthew White Racing	24	(Australia) Matthew White	13	—N/a	
Holden	Commodore VT	Matthew White Racing	76	(Australia) Matthew White	2	—N/a	
Holden	Commodore VT	Matthew White Racing	76	(Australia) Andrew Miedecke	9	(United Kingdom) Tony Quinn	9
Holden	Commodore VT	Phoenix Motorsport	59	(Australia) Ron Searle	10	(Australia) Jamie Miller	10
Holden	Commodore VX	Imrie Motorsport	13	(Australia) David Krause	10	(Australia) Christian D'Agostin	10
Holden	Commodore VX	Lansvale Smash Repairs	23	(Australia) Trevor Ashby	1	—N/a	
Holden	Commodore VX	Doulman Automotive	24	(Australia) Peter Doulman	10	(Australia) Bob McDonald	10
Holden	Commodore VX	Clive Wiseman Racing	50	(Australia) Stephen White	1	—N/a	

^1 – Ross Halliday was the entered co-driver, but was replaced prior to race start with Peter Doulman.

=== Team changes ===
- Having been contracted out to Romano Racing in 2001, the Holden Young Lions program returned to being operated out of the Holden Racing Team with Rick Kelly.
- Glenn Seton Racing contracted from two cars to one.
- Following the departure of Fred Gibson as team principal, Gibson Motorsport was renamed 00 Motorsport and expanded from two cars to three with Neil Crompton joining the team on a full-time basis.
- Perkins Engineering expanded from two cars to three with Steven Richards joining the team after a year with Glenn Seton Racing.
- Brad Jones Racing expanded from one car to two with John Bowe joining the team from Briggs Motor Sport.
- Briggs Motor Sport expanded from one car to three with a franchise purchased from Fred Gibson.

=== Driver changes ===
- Rick Kelly joined the series with the Holden Young Lions
- Steven Richards left Glenn Seton Racing to join Perkins Engineering
- John Bowe left Briggs Motor Sport to join Brad Jones Racing
- Tony Longhurst left Rod Nash Racing to join Briggs Motor Sport
- Max Wilson joined the series with Briggs Motor Sport
- Craig Baird returned to the series replacing Tony Longhurst at Rod Nash Racing
- Neil Crompton joined 00 Motorsport on a full time basis, haing driven for the team as an endurance driver in 2001

== Results and standings ==
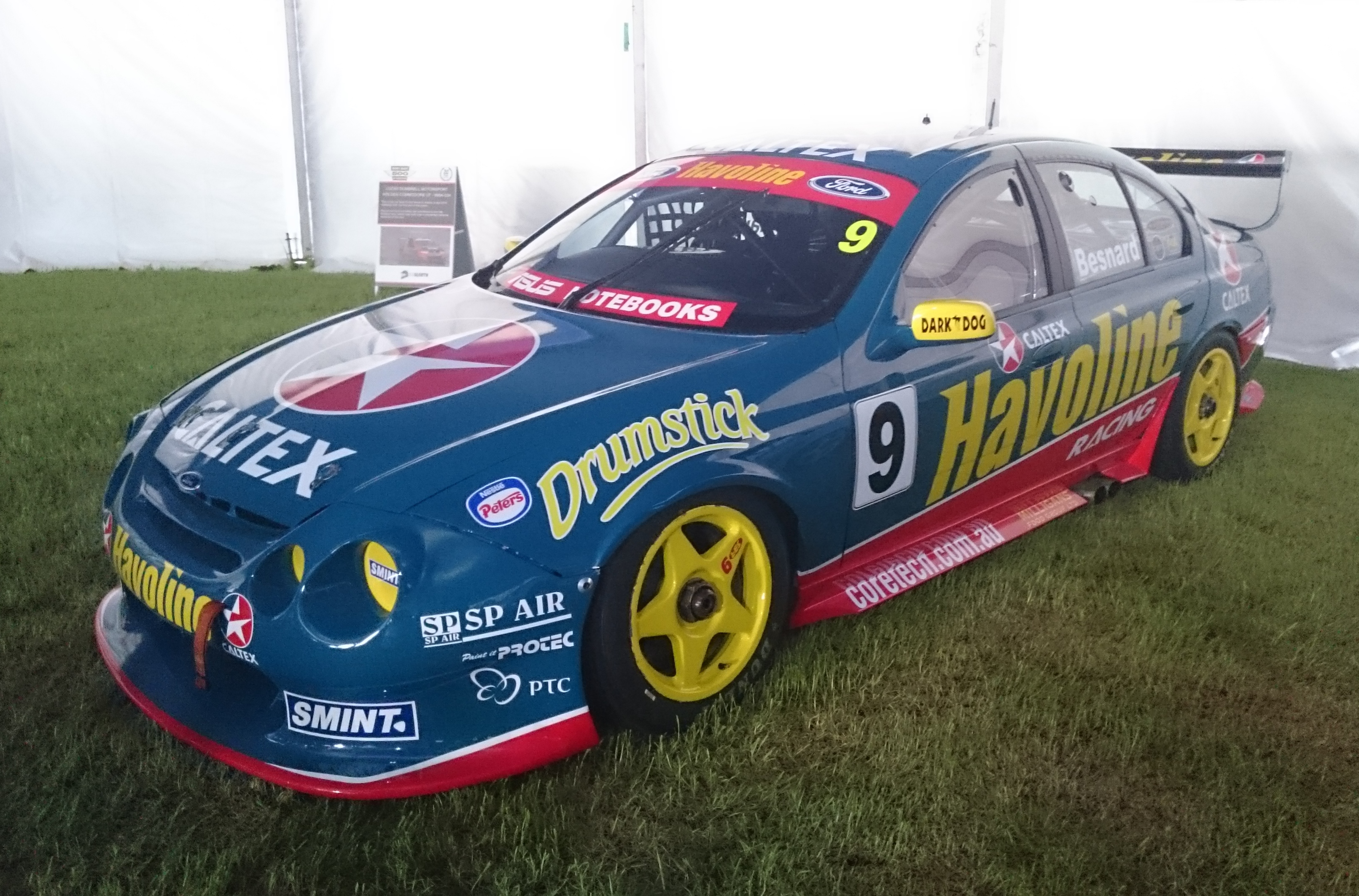
David Besnard and Simon Wills won the 2002 Queensland 500 driving a Ford Falcon AU. The car is pictured in 2018

=== Results summary ===
Round	Race	Event	Pole position	Race winners	Round winner	Report
1	R1	Adelaide	(Australia) Mark Skaife	(Australia) Mark Skaife	(Australia) Mark Skaife (Holden Racing Team, Holden)	report
1	R2	Adelaide		(Australia) Mark Skaife	(Australia) Mark Skaife (Holden Racing Team, Holden)	report
2	R1	Phillip Island	(Australia) Marcos Ambrose	(Australia) Marcos Ambrose	(Australia) Mark Skaife (Holden Racing Team, Holden)	report
2	R2	Phillip Island		(Australia) Mark Skaife	(Australia) Mark Skaife (Holden Racing Team, Holden)	report
3	R1	Eastern Creek	(Australia) Mark Skaife	(Australia) Mark Skaife	(Australia) Mark Skaife (Holden Racing Team, Holden)	report
3	R2	Eastern Creek		(Australia) Mark Skaife	(Australia) Mark Skaife (Holden Racing Team, Holden)	report
3	R3	Eastern Creek		(Australia) Mark Skaife	(Australia) Mark Skaife (Holden Racing Team, Holden)	report
4	R1	Darwin	(Australia) Jason Bright	(Australia) Jason Bright	(Australia) Mark Skaife (Holden Racing Team, Holden)	report
4	R2	Darwin		(Australia) Mark Skaife	(Australia) Mark Skaife (Holden Racing Team, Holden)	report
4	R3	Darwin		(Australia) Mark Skaife	(Australia) Mark Skaife (Holden Racing Team, Holden)	report
5	R1	Canberra	(Australia) Craig Lowndes	(Australia) Mark Skaife	(Australia) Mark Skaife (Holden Racing Team, Holden)	report
5	R2	Canberra		(Australia) Russell Ingall	(Australia) Mark Skaife (Holden Racing Team, Holden)	report
5	R3	Canberra		(Australia) Mark Skaife	(Australia) Mark Skaife (Holden Racing Team, Holden)	report
6	R1	Perth	(Australia) Mark Skaife	(Australia) Mark Skaife	(Australia) Jason Bright (Holden Racing Team, Holden)	report
6	R2	Perth		(New Zealand) Greg Murphy	(Australia) Jason Bright (Holden Racing Team, Holden)	report
6	R3	Perth		(Australia) Jason Bright	(Australia) Jason Bright (Holden Racing Team, Holden)	report
7	R1	Oran Park	(Australia) Marcos Ambrose	(Australia) Mark Skaife	(Australia) Mark Skaife (Holden Racing Team, Holden)	report
7	R2	Oran Park		(Australia) Mark Skaife	(Australia) Mark Skaife (Holden Racing Team, Holden)	report
8	R1	Winton	(Australia) Marcos Ambrose	(Australia) Jason Bright	(Australia) Jason Bright (Holden Racing Team, Holden)	report
8	R2	Winton		(Australia) Jason Bright	(Australia) Jason Bright (Holden Racing Team, Holden)	report
9		Ipswich	(Australia) Marcos Ambrose	(Australia) David Besnard (New Zealand) Simon Wills (Stone Brothers Racing, Ford)		report
10		Bathurst	(Australia) Mark Skaife	(Australia) Mark Skaife (New Zealand) Jim Richards (Holden Racing Team, Holden)		report
11	R1	Gold Coast	(New Zealand) Greg Murphy	(New Zealand) Greg Murphy	(Australia) Jason Bargwanna (Garry Rogers Motorsport, Holden)	report
11	R2	Gold Coast		(Australia) Jason Bargwanna	(Australia) Jason Bargwanna (Garry Rogers Motorsport, Holden)	report
12	R1	Pukekohe	(Australia) Mark Skaife	(Australia) Mark Skaife	(New Zealand) Greg Murphy (Tom Walkinshaw Racing Australia, Holden)	report
12	R2	Pukekohe		(New Zealand) Greg Murphy	(New Zealand) Greg Murphy (Tom Walkinshaw Racing Australia, Holden)	report
12	R3	Pukekohe		(Australia) Todd Kelly	(New Zealand) Greg Murphy (Tom Walkinshaw Racing Australia, Holden)	report
13	R1	Sandown	(Australia) Marcos Ambrose	(Australia) Marcos Ambrose	(Australia) Marcos Ambrose (Stone Brothers Racing, Ford)	report
13	R2	Sandown		(Australia) Marcos Ambrose	(Australia) Marcos Ambrose (Stone Brothers Racing, Ford)	report

=== Points system ===
Championship points were awarded according to the follow table.

Round	Event	Day	Distance	1st	2nd	3rd	4th	5th	6th	7th	8th	9th	10th	11th	12th	13th	14th	15th	16th	17th	18th	19th	20th	21st	22nd	23rd	24th	25th	26th	27th	28th	29th	30th	31st	32nd
1	Clipsal 500	Sat	250 km	200	160	128	104	88	80	72	64	60	56	52	48	44	40	36	34	32	30	28	26	24	22	20	18	16	14	12	10	8	6	4	2
		Sun	250 km	200	160	128	104	88	80	72	64	60	56	52	48	44	40	36	34	32	30	28	26	24	22	20	18	16	14	12	10	8	6	4	2
2	Phillip Island	Sun	150 km	100	80	64	52	44	40	36	32	30	28	26	24	22	20	18	17	16	15	14	13	12	11	10	9	8	7	6	5	4	3	2	1
		Sun	150 km	100	80	64	52	44	40	36	32	30	28	26	24	22	20	18	17	16	15	14	13	12	11	10	9	8	7	6	5	4	3	2	1
3	Eastern Creek	Sat	20 min	80	64	51	42	35	32	29	26	24	23	22	21	20	19	18	17	16	15	14	13	12	11	10	9	8	7	6	5	4	3	2	1
		Sun	150 km	80	64	51	42	35	32	29	26	24	23	22	21	20	19	18	17	16	15	14	13	12	11	10	9	8	7	6	5	4	3	2	1
		Sun	150 km	80	64	51	42	35	32	29	26	24	23	22	21	20	19	18	17	16	15	14	13	12	11	10	9	8	7	6	5	4	3	2	1
4	Hidden Valley	Sat	20 min	80	64	51	42	35	32	29	26	24	23	22	21	20	19	18	17	16	15	14	13	12	11	10	9	8	7	6	5	4	3	2	1
		Sun	100 km	80	64	51	42	35	32	29	26	24	23	22	21	20	19	18	17	16	15	14	13	12	11	10	9	8	7	6	5	4	3	2	1
		Sun	100 km	80	64	51	42	35	32	29	26	24	23	22	21	20	19	18	17	16	15	14	13	12	11	10	9	8	7	6	5	4	3	2	1
5	Canberra 400	Sat	25 laps	80	64	51	42	35	32	29	26	24	23	22	21	20	19	18	17	16	15	14	13	12	11	10	9	8	7	6	5	4	3	2	1
		Sun	25 laps	80	64	51	42	35	32	29	26	24	23	22	21	20	19	18	17	16	15	14	13	12	11	10	9	8	7	6	5	4	3	2	1
		Sun	50 laps	240	192	154	125	106	96	86	77	72	67	62	58	53	48	43	41	38	36	34	31	29	26	24	22	19	17	14	12	10	7	5	3
6	VB300	Sat	100 km	80	64	51	42	35	32	29	26	24	23	22	21	20	19	18	17	16	15	14	13	12	11	10	9	8	7	6	5	4	3	2	1
		Sun	100 km	80	64	51	42	35	32	29	26	24	23	22	21	20	19	18	17	16	15	14	13	12	11	10	9	8	7	6	5	4	3	2	1
		Sun	100 km	80	64	51	42	35	32	29	26	24	23	22	21	20	19	18	17	16	15	14	13	12	11	10	9	8	7	6	5	4	3	2	1
7	Oran Park	Sun	150 km	100	80	64	52	44	40	36	32	30	28	26	24	22	20	18	17	16	15	14	13	12	11	10	9	8	7	6	5	4	3	2	1
		Sun	150 km	100	80	64	52	44	40	36	32	30	28	26	24	22	20	18	17	16	15	14	13	12	11	10	9	8	7	6	5	4	3	2	1
8	Winton	Sun	100 km	100	80	64	52	44	40	36	32	30	28	26	24	22	20	18	17	16	15	14	13	12	11	10	9	8	7	6	5	4	3	2	1
		Sun	100 km	100	80	64	52	44	40	36	32	30	28	26	24	22	20	18	17	16	15	14	13	12	11	10	9	8	7	6	5	4	3	2	1
9	VIP Petfoods Queensland 500	Sun	500 km	400	320	256	208	176	160	144	128	120	112	104	96	88	80	72	68	64	60	56	52	48	44	40	36	32	28	24	20	16	12	8	4
10	Bob Jane T-Marts 1000	Sun	1000 km	400	320	256	208	176	160	144	128	120	112	104	96	88	80	72	68	64	60	56	52	48	44	40	36	32	28	24	20	16	12	8	4
11	Honda Indy 300	Sat	100 km	100	80	64	52	44	40	36	32	30	28	26	24	22	20	18	17	16	15	14	13	12	11	10	9	8	7	6	5	4	3	2	1
		Sun	100 km	100	80	64	52	44	40	36	32	30	28	26	24	22	20	18	17	16	15	14	13	12	11	10	9	8	7	6	5	4	3	2	1
12	Boost Mobile NZ V8 International	Sat	100 km	80	64	51	42	35	32	29	26	24	23	22	21	20	19	18	17	16	15	14	13	12	11	10	9	8	7	6	5	4	3	2	1
		Sun	100 km	80	64	51	42	35	32	29	26	24	23	22	21	20	19	18	17	16	15	14	13	12	11	10	9	8	7	6	5	4	3	2	1
		Sun	100 km	80	64	51	42	35	32	29	26	24	23	22	21	20	19	18	17	16	15	14	13	12	11	10	9	8	7	6	5	4	3	2	1
13	Sandown V8 Ultimate	Sat	150 km	80	64	51	42	35	32	29	26	24	23	22	21	20	19	18	17	16	15	14	13	12	11	10	9	8	7	6	5	4	3	2	1
		Sun	300 km	160	128	102	83	70	64	58	51	48	45	42	38	35	32	29	27	26	24	22	21	19	18	16	14	13	11	10	8	6	5	3	2

In rounds 9 & 10 points were split equally between drivers sharing the car, each being awarded half the number of tabled points for the round.

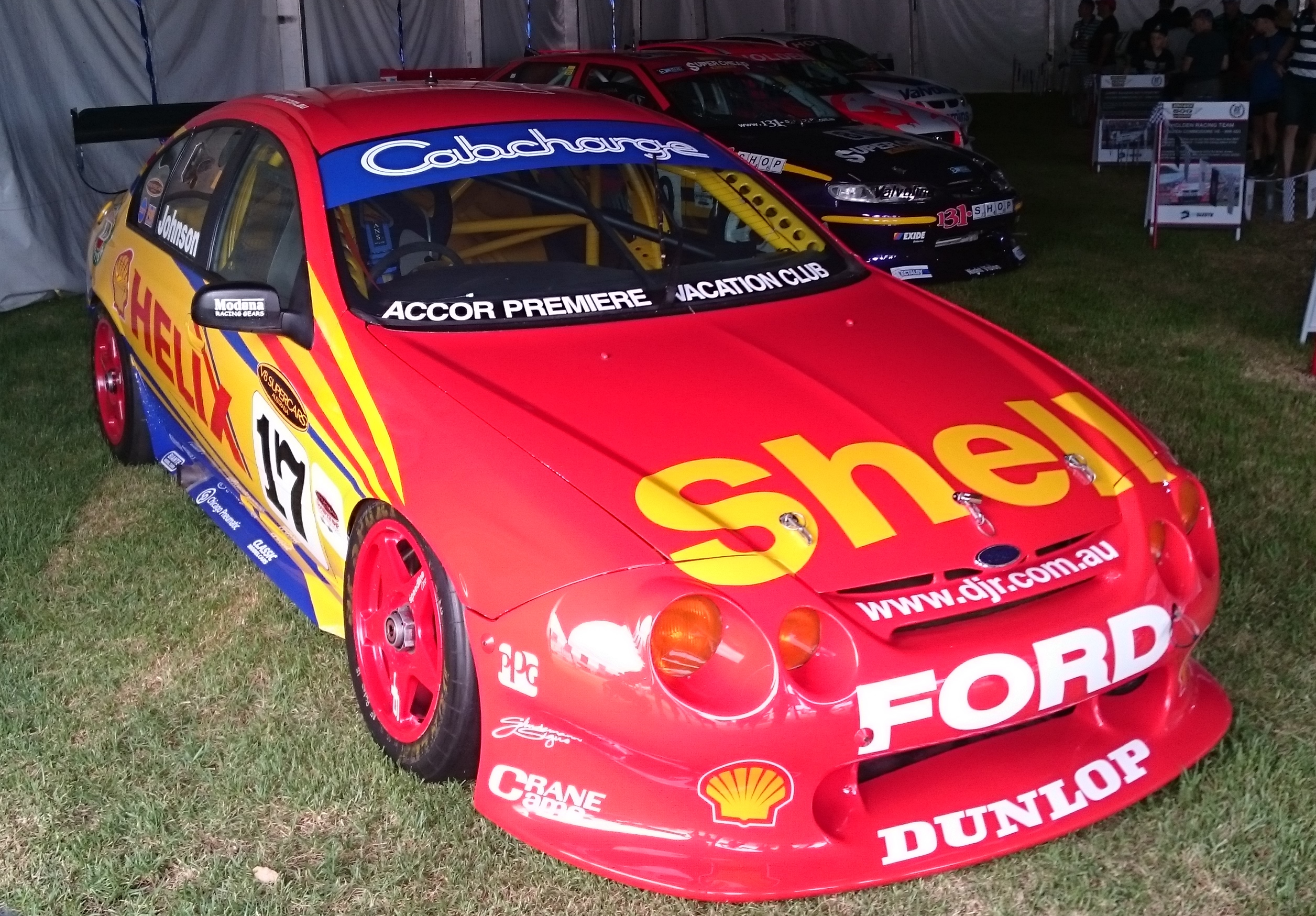
Steven Johnson placed 14th in the championship driving a Ford Falcon AU for Dick Johnson Racing. The car is pictured in 2018

=== Drivers Championship ===
Pos	Driver	Car	Penalty	Rd 1	Rd 2	Rd 3	Rd 4	Rd 5	Rd 6	Rd 7	Rd 8	Rd 9	Rd 10	Rd 11	Rd 12	Rd 13	Pts
1	Mark Skaife	Holden VX Commodore	0	400	180	240	224	340	109	200	82	Ret	200	9	80	163	2227
2	Greg Murphy	Holden VX Commodore	0	320	16	106	135	125	182	10	108	56	44	115	186	166	1569
3	Marcos Ambrose	Ford AU Falcon	0	128	100	170	110	105	64	132	132	88	24	80	125	240	1498
4	Jason Bright	Holden VX Commodore	20	88	82	49	208	117	208	144	200	Ret	128	66	106	83	1459
5	Todd Kelly	Holden VX Commodore	0	108	144	89	118	266	77	Ret	144	56	44	100	157	42	1345
6	Steven Richards	Holden VX Commodore	0	216	13	66	103	165	52	116	60	160	160	88	79	32	1310
7	Craig Lowndes	Ford AU Falcon	0	208	24	139	32	195	56	60	8	80	Ret	144	50	55	1051
8	David Besnard	Ford AU Falcon	0	22	54	62	88	159	122	54	58	200	Ret	30	30	109	988
9	Russell Ingall	Holden VX Commodore	0	96	34	45	24	157	42	88	70	160	160	Ret	67	30	973
10	Garth Tander	Holden VX Commodore	0	160	49	119	73	58	42	58	84	128	Ret	69	19	26	885
11	Tony Longhurst	Ford AU Falcon	0	102	76	44	35	109	69	52	16	18	80	60	62	69	792
12	John Bowe	Ford AU Falcon	0	92	41	70	38	122	93	24	58	60	34	25	34	88	779
13	Jason Bargwanna	Holden VX Commodore	0	116	Ret	36	66	70	61	5	35	128	Ret	144	49	55	765
14	Steven Johnson	Ford AU Falcon	0	120	60	53	40	138	18	8	6	44	Ret	56	26	57	626
15	Brad Jones	Ford AU Falcon	0	54	25	38	68	87	71	5	56	60	34	8	73	42	621
16	Rick Kelly	Holden VX Commodore	0	Ret	57	39	21	0	49	50	58	Ret	104	11	115	70	574
17	Neil Crompton	Ford AU Falcon	0	Ret	39	55	38	71	67	64	37	80	Ret	32	65	21	569
18	Larry Perkins	Holden VX Commodore	30	92	40	33	37	47		19	36	72	88	38	64	32	568
19	Jason Richards	Holden VT Commodore; Holden VX Commodore	0	60	8	39	24	125	39	23	23	22	52	52	36	41	544
20	Simon Wills	Ford AU Falcon; Holden VX Commodore	0	34	39	26	28	38	40	34		200	52			5	496
21	Steve Ellery	Ford AU Falcon	0	Ret	20	44	38	23	37	72	13	40	60	26	37	68	478
22	Paul Weel	Ford AU Falcon	0	44	34	18	32	20	40	Ret	1	88	24	43	56	68	468
23	Mark Larkham	Ford AU Falcon	0	92	14	32	52	63	14	21	14	52	30	23	26	31	464
24	Glenn Seton	Ford AU Falcon	0	30	60	35	67	19	38	52	19	Ret	Ret	17	32	49	418
25	Cameron McLean	Ford AU Falcon	0	18	DNQ	17	27	49	57	14	32	36	64	34	37	19	404
26	Paul Radisich	Ford AU Falcon	0	Ret	100	67	22	26	26	35	16	44	Ret	58	Ret	4	398
27	Craig Baird	Holden VX Commodore	0	48	42	20	36	93	22	16	32	Ret	20	24	15	12	380
28	Cameron McConville	Holden VX Commodore	0	Ret	78	42	28	31	69	20	16	Ret	36	38	15	2	375
29	John Faulkner	Holden VX Commodore	0	Ret	Ret	83	8	96	35	31	14	Ret	56	15	13	14	365
30	Rodney Forbes	Ford AU Falcon	0	70	Ret	14	1	9	33	11	35	48	40	16	24	36	337
31	Anthony Tratt	Ford AU Falcon	0	54	DNQ	DNQ	27	58	15	27	2	24	48	30	36		321
32	Max Wilson	Ford AU Falcon	0	Ret	15	32	45	16	53	9	19	Ret	Ret	32	63	35	319
33	Jim Richards	Holden VX Commodore	0									104	200				304
34	Tomas Mezera	Holden VX Commodore	0	DNQ	DNQ							104	128				232
35	Paul Morris	Holden VX Commodore	0	16	DNQ	DNQ	13	40	64	20	17	14	Ret			6	190
36	Greg Ritter	Ford AU Falcon	0		DNQ	36						64	72	13			185
37	Paul Dumbrell	Holden VX Commodore	0									72	88				160
38	Alan Jones	Ford AU Falcon	0									64	72				136
39	Nathan Pretty	Holden VX Commodore	0									Ret	104				104
40	Tony Scott	Ford AU Falcon	0									36	64				100
40	Luke Youlden	Ford AU Falcon	0									40	60				100
42	Matthew White	Ford AU Falcon	0		DNQ							18	80			Ret	98
44	Neal Bates	Ford AU Falcon	0									48	40				88
45	Dean Canto	Ford AU Falcon	0									Ret	Ret		52	34	86
46	Will Power	Ford AU Falcon	0									52	30				82
47	Paul Stokell	Ford AU Falcon	0									24	48			9	81
48	Steve Owen	Ford AU Falcon	0			DNQ					10	28	32				70
48	Wayne Wakefield	Holden VX Commodore	0					26		23	7	14	Ret				70
50	Wayne Gardner	Ford AU Falcon	0	36		DNQ	26						DNS				62
51	Dale Brede	Ford AU Falcon	0									28	32				60
51	John Cleland	Ford AU Falcon	0									32	28				60
51	Tim Leahey	Ford AU Falcon	0									32	28				60
54	Rick Bates	Holden VX Commodore	0									Ret	56				56
55	Stephen White	Holden VX Commodore	0	32	DNQ		11										43
56	Dugal McDougall	Holden VX Commodore	0	DNQ	24	DNQ				9	8	Ret	Ret				41
57	Christian D'Agostin	Holden VX Commodore	0									16	22				38
58	Warren Luff	Holden VX Commodore	0									Ret	36				36
59	Greg Crick	Ford AU Falcon	0	DNQ								34	Ret				34
59	Phillip Scifleet	Ford AU Falcon	0									34	Ret				34
61	Geoff Full	Ford AU Falcon	0									30	Ret				30
61	Mark Porter	Ford AU Falcon	0									30	Ret				30
63	Jamie Whincup	Holden VX Commodore	0									26	Ret				26
63	Max Dumesny	Holden VX Commodore	0									26					26
63	Ron Searle	Holden VT Commodore	0										26				26
63	Jamie Miller	Holden VT Commodore	0										26				26
67	David Krause	Holden VX Commodore	0										22				22
67	John McIntyre	Holden VX Commodore	0									22					22
69	Peter Brock	Holden VX Commodore	0										20				20
69	Andrew Miedecke	Holden VT Commodore	0									20					20
69	Tony Quinn	Holden VT Commodore	0									20					20
72	Michael Simpson	Ford AU Falcon	0										18				18
72	Kevin Mundy	Ford AU Falcon	0										18				18
74	Daryl Beattie	Holden VX Commodore	0									16	Ret				16
	Andy Priaulx	Holden VX Commodore	0									Ret	Ret				
	Yvan Muller	Holden VX Commodore	0									Ret	Ret				
	Mark Noske	Holden VX Commodore	0									Ret	Ret				
	Alan Gurr	Holden VX Commodore	0									Ret	Ret				
	Owen Kelly	Ford AU Falcon	0									Ret	DNS				
	Allan Grice	Ford AU Falcon	0										Ret				
	Peter Doulman	Ford AU Falcon	0										Ret				
	Andrew Jones	Ford AU Falcon	0										Ret				
	Matthew Coleman	Ford AU Falcon	0										Ret				
	Tyler Mecklem	Holden VX Commodore	0										Ret				
	Ross Halliday	Ford AU Falcon	0	DNQ									DNS				
	Bob McDonald	Holden VX Commodore	0										DNS				
	Trevor Ashby	Holden VX Commodore	0	DNQ													
	Paul Romano	Holden VX Commodore	150	32	14	DNQ	22			12	12						-58
Pos	Driver	Car	Penalty	Rd 1	Rd 2	Rd 3	Rd 4	Rd 5	Rd 6	Rd 7	Rd 8	Rd 9	Rd 10	Rd 11	Rd 12	Rd 13	Pts

Colour	Result
Gold	Winner
Silver	Second place
Bronze	Third place
Green	Points classification
Blue	Non-points classification
Blue	Non-classified finish (NC)
Purple	Retired, not classified (Ret)
Red	Did not qualify (DNQ)
Red	Did not pre-qualify (DNPQ)
Black	Disqualified (DSQ)
White	Did not start (DNS)
White	Withdrew (WD)
White	Race cancelled (C)
Blank	Did not practice (DNP)
Blank	Did not arrive (DNA)
Blank	Excluded (EX)

=== Champion Team of the Series ===
Champion Team of the Series was won by the Holden Racing Team, which was awarded the title as the team of the winning driver.

=== Champion Manufacturer of the Series ===
Champion Manufacturer of the Series was won by Holden, which was awarded the title as the manufacturer with the most round wins.

== See also ==
- 2002 V8 Supercar season
