= Holden Young Lions =

- Manufacturer: Holden
- Debut: 1997
- Race wins: 0
- Pole positions: 0

Holden Young Lions was a brand used by Australian motor vehicle manufacturer Holden for its young racing driver development program. First appearing in 1997, the program was operated by a number of teams over the years.

Year	Parent Team	Car	Drivers
1997	Holden Racing Team	Holden VS Commodore	#97 Jason Bargwanna #97 Mark Noske #97 Stephen White #97 Todd Kelly (test driver)
1998	Gibson Motorsport	Holden VS Commodore	#2 Steven Ellery
1999	Noske Racing	Holden VS Commodore	#15 Todd Kelly #99 Mark Noske
2000	Holden Racing Team	Holden VT Commodore	#15 Todd Kelly
2001	Romano Racing	Holden VX Commodore	#24 Paul Romano
2002	Holden Racing Team	Holden VX Commodore	#02 Rick Kelly
2003	John Faulkner Racing	Holden VX Commodore	#46 Dale Brede #96 Tony D'Alberto
2004	John Faulkner Racing	Holden VX Commodore	#46 Michael Caruso #46 Alan Gurr #96 Kurt Wimmer

In 2014 the Holden Young Lions brand was used by Holden as part of a golf education program.

== Bathurst 1000 Results ==
Year	Entrant	No.	Drivers	Car	Pos.	Laps
1997	Holden Racing Team	97	(Australia) Jason Bargwanna (Australia) Mark Noske	Holden Commodore VS	DNS	
1999	Holden Racing Team	15	(Australia) Todd Kelly (Australia) Mark Noske	Holden Commodore VT	6th	161
2000	Holden Racing Team	15	(Australia) Nathan Pretty (Australia) Todd Kelly	Holden Commodore VT	5th	161
2001	Romano Racing	24	(Australia) Paul Romano (Australia) Owen Kelly	Holden Commodore VX	13th	159
2002	Holden Racing Team	02	(Australia) Rick Kelly (Australia) Nathan Pretty	Holden Commodore VX	4th	161
2003	John Faulkner Racing	46	(Australia) Dale Brede (Australia) Tony Ricciardello	Holden Commodore VX	DNF	72
2004	John Faulkner Racing	43	(Australia) Christian D'Agostin (Australia) Kurt Wimmer	Holden Commodore VX	19th	157

== Super2 drivers ==
The List of following drivers have race for the team in the Super2 Series, In order from first appearance. Drivers who drove for the team on a part-time basis are listed in italics

- (Australia) Dale Brede (2003)
- (Australia) Tony D'Alberto (2003)
- (Australia) Michael Caruso (2004)
- (Australia) Steve Owen (2004)
- (Australia) Alan Gurr (2004)
- (Australia) Kurt Wimmer (2004)
