= 2002 Bob Jane T-Marts 1000 =

Motor race in Australia

Seasons
- ← 2001 2003 →

(New South Wales) 2002 Bob Jane T-Marts 1000
Event Information
- Round 10 of 13 in the 2002 V8 Supercar Championship Series
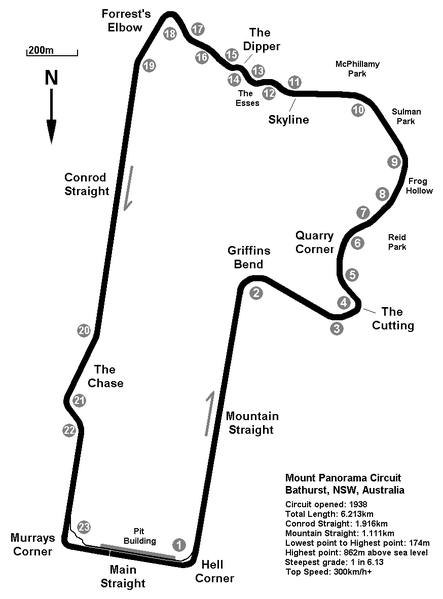
- Date: 10–13 October 2002
- Location: Bathurst, New South Wales
- Venue: Mount Panorama Circuit
- Weather: Fine with patchy rain and hail

Results
Race 1
Distance	161 laps	1000 km
Pole position	(Australia) Mark Skaife; Holden Racing Team	2:08.8278
Winner	(Australia) Mark Skaife (New Zealand) Jim Richards; Holden Racing Team	6:58:41.0260
Round Results
First	(Australia) Mark Skaife (New Zealand) Jim Richards; Holden Racing Team	200 pts
Second	(New Zealand) Steven Richards (Australia) Russell Ingall; Perkins Engineering	160 pts
Third	(Australia) Jason Bright (Australia) Tomas Mezera; Holden Racing Team	128 pts

The 2002 Bob Jane T-Marts 1000 was a motor race for V8 Supercars, held on 13 October 2002 at the Mount Panorama Circuit just outside Bathurst in New South Wales, Australia. It was the tenth round of the 2002 V8 Supercar Championship Series.

The race was the sixth running of the Australia 1000 race, first held after the organisational split over the Bathurst 1000 that occurred in 1997. It was the 45th race for which a lineage can be traced back to the 1960 Armstrong 500 held at Phillip Island (including the 1960 race itself).

The race was won by Mark Skaife and Jim Richards driving a Holden Racing Team prepared Holden VX Commodore. The pair were re-united in sharing a car at Bathurst for the first time in seven years having previously won the race together in 1991 and 1992. It was Skaife's fourth win and the seventh and final win for Richards, placing him second on the list of Bathurst 1000 winners. It was also the fourth win for the Holden Racing Team, successfully defending their 2001 victory.

This race is notable for featuring the longest stop-go penalties in the history of the V8 Supercars. A five-minute penalty was awarded to Greg Murphy due to a pit-lane infringement and a similar penalty was imposed on the Team Brock car (No. 05) for a similar offence.

== Entry list ==
No.	Drivers	Team (Sponsor)	Car	No.	Drivers	Team (Sponsor)	Car
00	(Australia) Craig Lowndes (Australia) Neil Crompton	00 Motorsport (Ford)	Ford Falcon AU	21	(Australia) Brad Jones (Australia) John Bowe	Brad Jones Racing (OzEmail)	Ford Falcon AU
1	(Australia) Mark Skaife (New Zealand) Jim Richards	Holden Racing Team (Holden, Mobil 1)	Holden Commodore VX	22	(Australia) Dugal McDougall (Australia) Alan Gurr	McDougall Motorsport (Pepsi)	Holden Commodore VX
02	(Australia) Rick Kelly (Australia) Nathan Pretty	Holden Young Lions (EA Sports)	Holden Commodore VX	24	(Australia) Peter Doulman (Australia) Robert McDonald	Doulman Automotive (Doulman Automotive)	Holden Commodore VT
2	(Australia) Jason Bright (Australia) Tomas Mezera	Holden Racing Team (Holden, Mobil 1)	Holden Commodore VX	29	(Australia) Paul Morris (Australia) Wayne Wakefield	Paul Morris Motorsport (Sirromet Wines)	Holden Commodore VX
3	(Australia) Cameron McConville (Australia) Warren Luff	Lansvale Smash Repairs (Lansvale Smash Repairs)	Holden Commodore VX	31	(Australia) Steven Ellery (Australia) Luke Youlden	Steven Ellery Racing (Supercheap Auto)	Ford Falcon AU
4	(Australia) Marcos Ambrose (Australia) Paul Weel	Stone Brothers Racing (Pirtek)	Ford Falcon AU	34	(Australia) Garth Tander (Australia) Jason Bargwanna	Garry Rogers Motorsport (Valvoline, Repco)	Holden Commodore VX
05	(Australia) Peter Brock (New Zealand) Craig Baird	Rod Nash Racing (AutoArt, Motorola)	Holden Commodore VX	35	(Australia) Jamie Whincup (Australia) Mark Noske	Garry Rogers Motorsport (Valvoline, Repco)	Holden Commodore VX
5	(Australia) Glenn Seton (Australia) Owen Kelly	Glenn Seton Racing (Ford Credit)	Ford Falcon AU	40	(Australia) Cameron McLean (Australia) Tony Scott	Paragon Motorsport (VIP Petfoods)	Ford Falcon AU
7	(Australia) Rodney Forbes (Australia) Neal Bates	00 Motorsport (Milk)	Ford Falcon AU	43	(New Zealand) Mark Porter (Australia) Geoff Full	Paul Weel Racing (Hydraulink)	Ford Falcon AU
9	(Australia) Wayne Gardner (Australia) David Besnard	Stone Brothers Racing (Caltex Havoline)	Ford Falcon AU	46	(New Zealand) John Faulkner (Australia) Rick Bates	John Faulkner Racing (Dynapack)	Holden Commodore VX
10	(Australia) Mark Larkham (Australia) Will Power	Larkham Motorsport (Orrcon Steel)	Ford Falcon AU	51	(New Zealand) Greg Murphy (Australia) Todd Kelly	Kmart Racing Team (Kmart)	Holden Commodore VX
11	(Australia) Larry Perkins (Australia) Paul Dumbrell	Perkins Engineering (Castrol)	Holden Commodore VX	56	(Australia) Michael Simpson (Australia) Kevin Mundy	Michael Simpson Racing (Actron Air)	Ford Falcon AU
13	(Australia) Christian D'Agostin (Australia) David Krause	Imrie Motorsport (Saabwreck)	Holden Commodore VX	59	(Australia) Jamie Miller (Australia) Ron Searle	Phoenix Motorsport (Transtar Express)	Holden Commodore VT
14	(Australia) Daryl Beattie (Australia) Tyler Mecklem	Imrie Motorsport (Saabwreck)	Holden Commodore VX	65	(Brazil) Max Wilson (Australia) Dean Canto	Briggs Motor Sport (Betta Electrical)	Ford Falcon AU
15	(France) Yvan Muller (United Kingdom) Andy Priaulx	Kmart Racing Team (Kmart)	Holden Commodore VX	66	(Australia) Tony Longhurst (Australia) Matthew White	Briggs Motor Sport (Betta Electrical)	Ford Falcon AU
16	(New Zealand) Steven Richards (Australia) Russell Ingall	Perkins Engineering (Castrol)	Holden Commodore VX	75	(Australia) Anthony Tratt (Australia) Paul Stokell	Paul Little Racing (Toll Ipec)	Ford Falcon AU
17	(Australia) Steven Johnson (New Zealand) Paul Radisich	Dick Johnson Racing (Shell Helix)	Ford Falcon AU	87	(Australia) Allan Grice (Australia) Ross Halliday	Nilsson Motorsport (Gulf Western Oil)	Ford Falcon AU
18	(Australia) Greg Ritter (Australia) Alan Jones	Dick Johnson Racing (Shell Helix)	Ford Falcon AU	161	(Australia) Greg Crick (Australia) Phillip Scifleet	Halliday Motorsport (Coopers, 3M)	Ford Falcon AU
20	(Australia) Andrew Jones (Australia) Matthew Coleman	Brad Jones Racing (Natrad Radiators)	Ford Falcon AU	600	(Australia) Steve Owen (Australia) Dale Brede	Briggs Motor Sport (Caterpillar)	Ford Falcon AU
021	(New Zealand) Jason Richards (New Zealand) Simon Wills	Team Kiwi Racing (Vodafone)	Holden Commodore VX	888	(United Kingdom) John Cleland (Australia) Tim Leahey	Brad Jones Racing (OzEmail)	Ford Falcon AU

== Qualifying ==
=== Qualifying ===
Pos.	No.	Driver	Team	Car	Time	Gap	Grid
1	21	(Australia) John Bowe (Australia) Brad Jones	Brad Jones Racing	Ford Falcon AU	2:08.3873		Top 15
2	1	(Australia) Mark Skaife (New Zealand) Jim Richards	Holden Racing Team	Holden Commodore VX	2:08.4047	+0.0174	Top 15
3	2	(Australia) Jason Bright (Australia) Tomas Mezera	Holden Racing Team	Holden Commodore VX	2:09.0170	+0.6297	Top 15
4	16	(New Zealand) Steven Richards (Australia) Russell Ingall	Perkins Engineering	Holden Commodore VX	2:09.1405	+0.7532	Top 15
5	00	(Australia) Craig Lowndes (Australia) Neil Crompton	Gibson Motorsport	Ford Falcon AU	2:09.3559	+0.9686	Top 15
6	65	(Brazil) Max Wilson (Australia) Dean Canto	Briggs Motor Sport	Ford Falcon AU	2:09.4655	+1.0782	Top 15
7	31	(Australia) Steven Ellery (Australia) Luke Youlden	Steven Ellery Racing	Ford Falcon AU	2:09.6381	+1.2508	Top 15
8	34	(Australia) Garth Tander (Australia) Jason Bargwanna	Garry Rogers Motorsport	Holden Commodore VX	2:09.6631	+1.2758	Top 15
9	11	(Australia) Larry Perkins (Australia) Paul Dumbrell	Perkins Engineering	Holden Commodore VX	2:09.6931	+1.3058	Top 15
10	51	(New Zealand) Greg Murphy (Australia) Todd Kelly	K-Mart Racing Team	Holden Commodore VX	2:09.7464	+1.3591	Top 15
11	4	(Australia) Marcos Ambrose (Australia) Paul Weel	Stone Brothers Racing	Ford Falcon AU	2:09.8100	+1.4227	Top 15
12	5	(Australia) Glenn Seton (Australia) Owen Kelly	Glenn Seton Racing	Ford Falcon AU	2:10.0471	+1.6598	Top 15
13	02	(Australia) Rick Kelly (Australia) Nathan Pretty	Holden Young Lions	Holden Commodore VX	2:10.0979	+1.7106	Top 15
14	29	(Australia) Paul Morris (Australia) Wayne Wakefield	Paul Morris Motorsport	Holden Commodore VX	2:10.1493	+1.7620	Top 15
15	18	(Australia) Greg Ritter (Australia) Alan Jones	Dick Johnson Racing	Ford Falcon AU	2:10.1569	+1.7696	Top 15
16	10	(Australia) Mark Larkham (Australia) Will Power	Larkham Motor Sport	Ford Falcon AU	2:10.2221	+1.8348	16
17	888	(United Kingdom) John Cleland (Australia) Tim Leahey	Brad Jones Racing	Ford Falcon AU	2:10.2432	+1.8559	17
18	15	(France) Yvan Muller (United Kingdom) Andy Priaulx	K-Mart Racing Team	Holden Commodore VX	2:10.3216	+1.9343	18
19	40	(Australia) Cameron McLean (Australia) Tony Scott	Paragon Motorsport	Ford Falcon AU	2:10.4261	+2.0388	19
20	3	(Australia) Cameron McConville (Australia) Warren Luff	Lansvale Smash Repairs	Holden Commodore VX	2:10.5120	+2.1247	20
21	66	(Australia) Tony Longhurst (Australia) Matthew White	Briggs Motor Sport	Ford Falcon AU	2:10.5701	+2.1828	21
22	17	(Australia) Steven Johnson (New Zealand) Paul Radisich	Dick Johnson Racing	Ford Falcon AU	2:10.5905	+2.2032	22
23	600	(Australia) Steve Owen (Australia) Dale Brede	Briggs Motor Sport	Ford Falcon AU	2:10.6554	+2.2681	23
24	161	(Australia) Greg Crick (Australia) Phillip Scifleet	Halliday Motorsport	Ford Falcon AU	2:10.7541	+2.3668	24
25	46	(New Zealand) John Faulkner (Australia) Rick Bates	John Faulkner Racing	Holden Commodore VX	2:10.8767	+2.4894	25
26	05	(Australia) Peter Brock (New Zealand) Craig Baird	Rod Nash Racing	Holden Commodore VX	2:10.9689	+2.5816	26
27	43	(New Zealand) Mark Porter (Australia) Geoff Full	Paul Weel Racing	Ford Falcon AU	2:11.0927	+2.7054	27
28	35	(Australia) Jamie Whincup (Australia) Mark Noske	Garry Rogers Motorsport	Holden Commodore VX	2:11.5330	+3.1457	28
29	7	(Australia) Rodney Forbes (Australia) Neal Bates	Gibson Motorsport	Ford Falcon AU	2:12.2725	+3.8852	29
30	22	(Australia) Dugal McDougall (Australia) Alan Gurr	McDougall Motorsport	Holden Commodore VX	2:13.2921	+4.9048	30
31	20	(Australia) Andrew Jones (Australia) Matthew Coleman	Brad Jones Racing	Ford Falcon AU	2:13.5751	+5.1878	31
32	14	(Australia) Daryl Beattie (Australia) Tyler Mecklem	Imrie Motorsport	Holden Commodore VX	2:14.1437	+5.7564	32
33	75	(Australia) Anthony Tratt (Australia) Paul Stokell	Paul Little Racing	Ford Falcon AU	2:14.7125	+6.3252	33
34	56	(Australia) Michael Simpson (Australia) Kevin Mundy	Michael Simpson Racing	Ford Falcon AU	2:14.8405	+6.4532	34
35	13	(Australia) Christian D'Agostin (Australia) David Krause	Imrie Motorsport	Holden Commodore VX	2:14.9576	+6.5703	35
36	24	(Australia) Peter Doulman (Australia) Bob McDonald	M3 Motorsport	Holden Commodore VT	2:16.1397	+7.7524	36
37	87	(Australia) Allan Grice (Australia) Ross Halliday	Nilsson Motorsport	Ford Falcon AU	2:20.6176	+12.2303	37
DNQ	021	(New Zealand) Jason Richards (New Zealand) Simon Wills	Team Kiwi Racing	Holden Commodore VX			38
DNQ	59	(Australia) Jamie Miller (Australia) Ron Searle	Phoenix Motorsport	Holden Commodore VT			39
DNQ	9	(Australia) Wayne Gardner (Australia) David Besnard	Stone Brothers Racing	Ford Falcon AU			DNS

=== Top Fifteen Shootout ===
Runoff results as follows:

Pos	No	Team	Driver	Car	Time
1	1	Holden Racing Team	(Australia) Mark Skaife	Holden VX Commodore	2:08.8278
2	21	OzEmail Racing Team	(Australia) John Bowe	Ford AU Falcon	2:09.0988
3	2	Holden Racing Team	(Australia) Jason Bright	Holden VX Commodore	2:09.2949
4	16	Castrol Perkins Race Team	(New Zealand) Steven Richards	Holden VX Commodore	2:09.9794
5	51	K-Mart Racing	(Australia) Todd Kelly	Holden VX Commodore	2:10.0135
6	02	Holden Young Lions	(Australia) Rick Kelly	Holden VX Commodore	2:10.0402
7	4	Stone Brothers Racing	(Australia) Marcos Ambrose	Ford AU Falcon	2:10.1008
8	00	Gibson Motorsport	(Australia) Craig Lowndes	Ford AU Falcon	2:10.2383
9	34	Garry Rogers Motorsport	(Australia) Garth Tander	Holden VX Commodore	2:10.3194
10	29	Team Sirromet Wines	(Australia) Paul Morris	Holden VX Commodore	2:10.5614
11	31	Supercheap Auto Racing	(Australia) Steven Ellery	Ford AU Falcon	2:10.6719
12	11	Castrol Perkins Race Team	(Australia) Larry Perkins	Holden VX Commodore	2:10.8570
13	65	Team Betta Electrical	(Brazil) Max Wilson	Ford AU Falcon	2:11.1268
DNS	5	Ford Tickford Racing	(Australia) Glenn Seton	Ford AU Falcon	
DSQ	18	Shell Helix Racing	(Australia) Greg Ritter	Ford AU Falcon	2:10.0652

=== Starting grid ===
The following table represents the final starting grid for the race on Sunday:

Inside row					Outside row				
1	(Australia) Mark Skaife (New Zealand) Jim Richards	1			21	(Australia) Brad Jones (Australia) John Bowe			2
1	Holden Racing Team (Holden Commodore VX)				Brad Jones Racing (Ford Falcon AU)				2
3			(Australia) Jason Bright (Czech Republic) Tomas Mezera	2			16	(New Zealand) Steven Richards (Australia) Russell Ingall	4
3			Holden Racing Team (Holden Commodore VX)				Perkins Engineering (Holden Commodore VX)		4
5	(New Zealand) Greg Murphy (Australia) Todd Kelly	51			02	(Australia) Rick Kelly (Australia) Nathan Pretty			6
5	K-Mart Racing Team (Holden Commodore VX)				Holden Young Lions (Holden Commodore VX)				6
7			(Australia) Marcos Ambrose (Australia) Paul Weel	4			00	(Australia) Craig Lowndes (Australia) Neil Crompton	8
7			Stone Brothers Racing (Ford Falcon AU)				00 Motorsport (Ford Falcon AU)		8
9	(Australia) Garth Tander (Australia) Jason Bargwanna	34			29	(Australia) Paul Morris (Australia) Wayne Wakefield			10
9	Garry Rogers Motorsport (Holden Commodore VX)				Paul Morris Motorsport (Holden Commodore VX)				10
11			(Australia) Steven Ellery (Australia) Luke Youlden	31			11	(Australia) Larry Perkins (Australia) Paul Dumbrell	12
11			Steven Ellery Racing (Ford Falcon AU)				Perkins Engineering (Holden Commodore VX)		12
13	(Brazil) Max Wilson (Australia) Dean Canto	65			5	(Australia) Glenn Seton (Australia) Owen Kelly (Australia) David Besnard			14
13	Briggs Motor Sport (Ford Falcon AU)				Glenn Seton Racing (Ford Falcon AU)				14
15			(Australia) Greg Ritter (Australia) Alan Jones	18			10	(Australia) Mark Larkham (Australia) Will Power	16
15			Dick Johnson Racing (Ford Falcon AU)				Larkham Motor Sport (Ford Falcon AU)		16
17	(United Kingdom) John Cleland (Australia) Tim Leahey	888			15	(France) Yvan Muller (United Kingdom) Andy Priaulx			18
17	Brad Jones Racing (Ford Falcon AU)				K-Mart Racing Team (Holden Commodore VX)				18
19			(Australia) Cameron McLean (Australia) Tony Scott	40			3	(Australia) Cameron McConville (Australia) Warren Luff	20
19			Paragon Motorsport (Ford Falcon AU)				Lansvale Smash Repairs (Holden Commodore VX)		20
21	(Australia) Tony Longhurst (Australia) Matthew White	66			17	(Australia) Steven Johnson (New Zealand) Paul Radisich			22
21	Briggs Motor Sport (Ford Falcon AU)				Dick Johnson Racing (Ford Falcon AU)				22
23			(Australia) Steve Owen (Australia) Dale Brede	600			161	(Australia) Greg Crick (Australia) Phillip Scifleet	24
23			Briggs Motor Sport (Ford Falcon AU)				Halliday Motorsport (Ford Falcon AU)		24
25	(New Zealand) John Faulkner (Australia) Rick Bates	46			05	(Australia) Peter Brock (New Zealand) Craig Baird			26
25	John Faulkner Racing (Holden Commodore VX)				Rod Nash Racing (Holden Commodore VX)				26
27			(New Zealand) Mark Porter (Australia) Geoff Full	43			35	(Australia) Jamie Whincup (Australia) Mark Noske	28
27			Paul Weel Racing (Ford Falcon AU)				Garry Rogers Motorsport (Holden Commodore VX)		28
29	(Australia) Rodney Forbes (Australia) Neal Bates	7			22	(Australia) Dugal McDougall (Australia) Alan Gurr			30
29	00 Motorsport (Ford Falcon AU)				McDougall Motorsport (Holden Commodore VX)				30
31			(Australia) Andrew Jones (Australia) Matthew Coleman	20			14	(Australia) Daryl Beattie (Australia) Tyler Mecklem	32
31			Brad Jones Racing (Ford Falcon AU)				Imrie Motorsport (Holden Commodore VX)		32
33	(Australia) Anthony Tratt (Australia) Paul Stokell	75			56	(Australia) Michael Simpson (Australia) Kevin Mundy			34
33	Paul Little Racing (Ford Falcon AU)				Michael Simpson Racing (Ford Falcon AU)				34
35			(Australia) Christian D'Agostin (Australia) David Krause	13			87	(Australia) Allan Grice (Australia) Ross Halliday (Australia) Peter Doulman	36
35			Imrie Motorsport (Holden Commodore VX)				Nilsson Motorsport (Ford Falcon AU)		36
37	(New Zealand) Jason Richards (New Zealand) Simon Wills	021			59	(Australia) Jamie Miller (Australia) Ron Searle			38
37	Team Kiwi Racing (Holden Commodore VX)				Phoenix Motorsport (Holden Commodore VT)				38

== Official results ==
Race results as follows:

Pos	No	Team	Drivers	Car	Laps	Time/Retired	Grid	Points
1	1	Holden Racing Team	(Australia) Mark Skaife (New Zealand) Jim Richards	Holden Commodore VX	161	6:58:41.0260	1	200
2	16	Perkins Engineering	(New Zealand) Steven Richards (Australia) Russell Ingall	Holden Commodore VX	161	+2.9372	4	160
3	2	Holden Racing Team	(Australia) Jason Bright (Australia) Tomas Mezera	Holden Commodore VX	161	+7.9454	3	128
4	02	Holden Young Lions	(Australia) Rick Kelly (Australia) Nathan Pretty	Holden Commodore VX	161	+12.7516	6	104
5	11	Perkins Engineering	(Australia) Larry Perkins (Australia) Paul Dumbrell	Holden Commodore VX	161	+20.1791	12	88
6	66	Briggs Motor Sport	(Australia) Tony Longhurst (Australia) Matthew White	Ford Falcon AU	161	+25.5411	21	80
7	18	Dick Johnson Racing	(Australia) Greg Ritter (Australia) Alan Jones	Ford Falcon AU	161	+51.5093	15	72
8	40	Paragon Motorsport	(Australia) Cameron McLean (Australia) Tony Scott	Ford Falcon AU	161	+55.7491	19	64
9	31	Steven Ellery Racing	(Australia) Steven Ellery (Australia) Luke Youlden	Ford Falcon AU	160	+1 lap	11	60
10	46	John Faulkner Racing	(New Zealand) John Faulkner (Australia) Rick Bates	Holden Commodore VX	160	+1 lap	25	56
11	021	Team Kiwi Racing	(New Zealand) Jason Richards (New Zealand) Simon Wills	Holden Commodore VX	160	+1 lap	38	52
12	75	Paul Little Racing	(Australia) Anthony Tratt (Australia) Paul Stokell	Ford Falcon AU	160	+1 lap	33	48
13	51	K-Mart Racing Team	(New Zealand) Greg Murphy (Australia) Todd Kelly	Holden Commodore VX	159	+2 laps	5	44
14	7	Gibson Motorsport	(Australia) Rodney Forbes (Australia) Neal Bates	Ford Falcon AU	159	+2 laps	29	40
15	3	Lansvale Smash Repairs	(Australia) Cameron McConville (Australia) Warren Luff	Holden Commodore VX	159	+2 laps	20	36
16	21	Brad Jones Racing	(Australia) John Bowe (Australia) Brad Jones	Ford Falcon AU	158	+3 laps	2	34
17	600	Briggs Motor Sport	(Australia) Steve Owen (Australia) Dale Brede	Ford Falcon AU	158	+3 laps	23	32
18	10	Larkham Motor Sport	(Australia) Mark Larkham (Australia) Will Power	Ford Falcon AU	157	+4 laps	16	30
19	888	Brad Jones Racing	(United Kingdom) John Cleland (Australia) Tim Leahey	Ford Falcon AU	157	+4 laps	17	28
20	59	Phoenix Motorsport	(Australia) Jamie Miller (Australia) Ron Searle	Holden Commodore VT	155	+6 laps	39	26
21	4	Stone Brothers Racing	(Australia) Marcos Ambrose (Australia) Paul Weel	Ford Falcon AU	154	+7 laps	7	24
22	13	Imrie Motorsport	(Australia) Christian D'Agostin (Australia) David Krause	Holden Commodore VX	145	+16 laps	35	22
23	05	Team Brock	(New Zealand) Craig Baird (Australia) Peter Brock	Holden Commodore VX	136	+25 laps	26	20
24	56	Michael Simpson Racing	(Australia) Kevin Mundy (Australia) Michael Simpson	Ford Falcon AU	129	+32 laps	34	18
DNF	29	Paul Morris Motorsport	(Australia) Paul Morris (Australia) Wayne Wakefield	Holden Commodore VX	135	Accident	10	
DNF	00	Gibson Motorsport	(Australia) Craig Lowndes (Australia) Neil Crompton	Ford Falcon AU	127	Overheating	8	
DNF	15	K-Mart Racing Team	(France) Yvan Muller (United Kingdom) Andy Priaulx	Holden Commodore VX	122	Engine	18	
DNF	65	Briggs Motor Sport	(Brazil) Max Wilson (Australia) Dean Canto	Ford Falcon AU	108	Accident	13	
DNF	5	Glenn Seton Racing	(Australia) Glenn Seton (Australia) David Besnard (Australia) Owen Kelly*	Ford Falcon AU	102	Gearbox	14	
DNF	161	Halliday Motor Sport	(Australia) Greg Crick (Australia) Phillip Scifleet	Ford Falcon AU	94	Retired	24	
DNF	43	Paul Weel Racing	(Australia) Geoff Full (New Zealand) Mark Porter	Ford Falcon AU	93	Accident	27	
DNF	14	Imrie Motorsport	(Australia) Tyler Mecklem (Australia) Daryl Beattie	Holden Commodore VX	84	Accident	32	
DNF	22	McDougall Motorsport	(Australia) Dugal McDougall (Australia) Alan Gurr	Holden Commodore VX	82	Retired	30	
DNF	35	Garry Rogers Motorsport	(Australia) Jamie Whincup (Australia) Mark Noske	Holden Commodore VX	72	Accident	28	
DNF	34	Garry Rogers Motorsport	(Australia) Garth Tander (Australia) Jason Bargwanna	Holden Commodore VX	51	Accident	9	
DNF	17	Dick Johnson Racing	(New Zealand) Paul Radisich (Australia) (Steven Johnson)***	Ford Falcon AU	29	Accident/Brakes	22	
DNF	20	Brad Jones Racing	(Australia) Andrew Jones (Australia) (Matthew Coleman)***	Ford Falcon AU	14	Retired	31	
DNF	87	Nilsson Motorsport	(Australia) Allan Grice (Australia) (Peter Doulman)*** (Australia) (Ross Halliday)**	Ford Falcon AU	1	Engine	37	
DNS	24	Doulman Automotive	(Australia) Bob McDonald (Australia) Peter Doulman	Holden Commodore VT		Did Not Start		
DNS	9	Stone Brothers Racing	(Australia) David Besnard (Australia) Wayne Gardner	Ford Falcon AU		Crash in Practice 2		

* Owen Kelly practiced the #5 Falcon but was replaced by David Besnard due to illness after Besnard own car was withdrawn after it was crashed heavily by Wayne Gardner
** Ross Halliday practiced the #87 Falcon but was replaced by Peter Doulman after Doulman's own car (#24) failed to qualify.
*** Steven Johnson, Matthew Coleman and Peter Doulman (whose names are shown within brackets in the table above) did not drive during the race.

== Statistics ==
- Provisional Pole Position – #21 John Bowe – 2:08.3873
- Pole Position – #1 Mark Skaife – 2:08.8278
- Fastest Lap – #21 Brad Jones – 2:09.5705
- Winners' Average Speed – 143.35 km/h

== Broadcast ==
Network 10 broadcast the race for the sixth consecutive year, dating back to the 1997 5.0L race. This was Matthew White's first commentary appearance at Bathurst. Bill Woods provided occasional commentary during the race in addition to hosting.

Network 10
Host: Bill Woods
Booth: Matthew White, Mark Oastler
Pit-lane: Greg Rust, Grant Denyer, Mark Aiston
