= 2003 Bob Jane T-Marts 1000 =

Motor race in Australia

Seasons
- ← 2002 2004 →

(New South Wales) 2003 Bob Jane T-Marts 1000
Event Information
- Round 10 of 13 in the 2003 V8 Supercar Championship Series
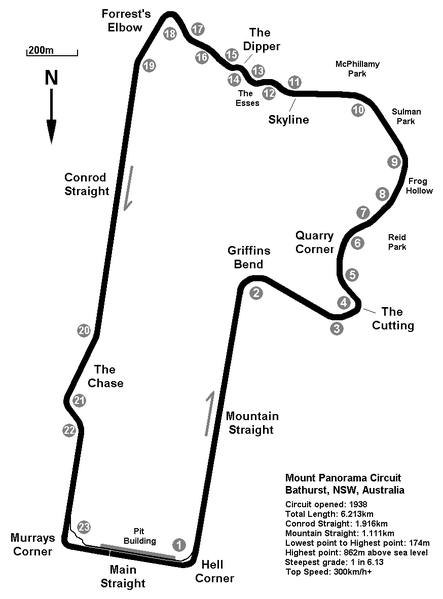
- Date: 9–12 October 2003
- Location: Bathurst, New South Wales
- Venue: Mount Panorama Circuit
- Weather: Fine

Results
Race 1
Distance	161 laps	1000 km
Pole position	(New Zealand) Greg Murphy; K-Mart Racing Team	2:06.8594
Winner	(New Zealand) Greg Murphy (Australia) Rick Kelly; K-Mart Racing Team	6:32:55.4044
Round Results
First	(New Zealand) Greg Murphy (Australia) Rick Kelly; K-Mart Racing Team	192 pts
Second	(Australia) Craig Lowndes (Australia) Glenn Seton; Ford Performance Racing	188 pts
Third	(Australia) Steven Ellery (Australia) Luke Youlden; Steven Ellery Racing	184 pts

The 2003 Bob Jane T-Marts 1000 was a motor race for V8 Supercars held on 12 October 2003 at the Mount Panorama Circuit just outside Bathurst, New South Wales, Australia. It was the seventh running of the Australia 1000 race, first held after the organisational split over the Bathurst 1000 that occurred in 1997. It was the 46th race that traces its lineage back to the 1960 Armstrong 500 held at Phillip Island. The race was the tenth round of the 2003 V8 Supercar Championship Series.

The race was won by Greg Murphy and Rick Kelly driving a K-Mart Racing Team run Holden Commodore (VY). It was the fifth consecutive victory for Holden, a new record. It was Murphy's third victory in the race and Kelly became the youngest driver to win the race, eclipsing the previous record set by Craig Lowndes in 1996.

On Saturday, Murphy also recorded what was then the fastest lap in the circuit's history to take pole position during the Top 10 Shootout. The time stood as the fastest ever in a V8 Supercar for 7 years until Craig Lowndes lapped barely a few hundredths faster in practice during the 2010 event, although neither are officially recognised as the lap record as only race laps contribute to lap records.

== Entry list ==
No.	Drivers	Team (Sponsor)	Car	No.	Drivers	Team (Sponsor)	Car
1	(Australia) Mark Skaife (Australia) Todd Kelly	Holden Racing Team (Holden, Mobil 1)	Holden Commodore (VY)	24	(Australia) Wayne Wakefield (New Zealand) Andy McElrea	Paul Morris Motorsport (Charter Trucks Christchurch)	Holden Commodore (VX)
2	(New Zealand) Jim Richards (Australia) Tony Longhurst	Holden Racing Team (Holden, Mobil 1)	Holden Commodore (VY)	29	(Australia) Paul Morris (New Zealand) John Faulkner	Paul Morris Motorsport (Sirromet Wines)	Holden Commodore (VY)
3	(Australia) Cameron McConville (Australia) Tim Leahey	Lansvale Smash Repairs (Sime Tyres)	Holden Commodore (VX)	31	(Australia) Steven Ellery (Australia) Luke Youlden	Steven Ellery Racing (Supercheap Auto)	Ford Falcon (BA)
4	(Australia) Marcos Ambrose (Australia) Russell Ingall	Stone Brothers Racing (Pirtek, Caltex Havoline)	Ford Falcon (BA)	33	(Australia) Nathan Pretty (Denmark) Allan Simonsen	Garry Rogers Motorsport (Valvoline, Repco)	Holden Commodore (VX)
5	(Australia) Darren Hossack (Australia) Adam Macrow	Ford Performance Racing (FPV)	Ford Falcon (BA)	34	(Australia) Garth Tander (Australia) Jamie Whincup	Garry Rogers Motorsport (Valvoline, Repco)	Holden Commodore (VY)
6	(Australia) Craig Lowndes (Australia) Glenn Seton	Ford Performance Racing (Caterpillar)	Ford Falcon (BA)	44	(New Zealand) Simon Wills (New Zealand) Jason Richards	Team Dynamik (World Industries)	Holden Commodore (VY)
8	(Australia) Paul Dumbrell (Australia) Tomas Mezera	Perkins Engineering (Castrol)	Holden Commodore (VX)	45	(France) Nicolas Minassian (Denmark) Jan Magnussen	Team Dynamik (World Industries)	Holden Commodore (VY)
9	(Australia) Mark Noske (Australia) Mark Winterbottom	Stone Brothers Racing (Pirtek, Caltex Havoline)	Ford Falcon (BA)	46	(Australia) Dale Brede (Australia) Tony Ricciardello	John Faulkner Racing (Holden Young Lions)	Holden Commodore (VX)
10	(Australia) Mark Larkham (Australia) Jason Bargwanna	Larkham Motorsport (Orrcon Steel)	Ford Falcon (BA)	50	(Australia) Jason Bright (Australia) Paul Weel	Paul Weel Racing (Betta Electrical)	Holden Commodore (VX)
11	(New Zealand) Steven Richards (Australia) Larry Perkins	Perkins Engineering (Castrol)	Holden Commodore (VY)	51	(New Zealand) Greg Murphy (Australia) Rick Kelly	K-Mart Racing Team (Kmart)	Holden Commodore (VY)
13	(Australia) Steve Owen (Australia) Phillip Scifleet	Robert Smith Racing (Smiths Trucks)	Holden Commodore (VX)	55	(Australia) José Fernández (Australia) David Russell	Fernández Racing (Fujitsu)	Ford Falcon (AU)
15	(United Kingdom) Andy Priaulx (Australia) Cameron McLean	K-Mart Racing Team (Kmart)	Holden Commodore (VX)	59	(Australia) Jamie Miller (Australia) Ron Searle	Phoenix Motorsport (Transtar Express)	Holden Commodore (VX)
16	(Australia) Greg Ritter (Australia) Marcus Marshall	Paul Weel Racing (Betta Electrical)	Holden Commodore (VX)	65	(New Zealand) Paul Radisich (Sweden) Rickard Rydell	Triple Eight Race Engineering (Betta Electrical)	Ford Falcon (BA)
17	(Australia) Steven Johnson (Australia) Warren Luff	Dick Johnson Racing (Shell Helix)	Ford Falcon (BA)	66	(Australia) Dean Canto (Australia) Matthew White	Triple Eight Race Engineering (Betta Electrical)	Ford Falcon (BA)
18	(Brazil) Max Wilson (Australia) David Brabham	Dick Johnson Racing (Shell Helix)	Ford Falcon (BA)	69	(Australia) Peter Doulman (Australia) Robert Jones	Doulman Automotive (Spies Hecker)	Holden Commodore (VX)
19	(Australia) David Besnard (Australia) Owen Kelly	Rod Nash Racing (Ford Credit)	Ford Falcon (BA)	72	(Australia) Alan Gurr (New Zealand) Jonny Reid	Robert Smith Racing (Smiths Trucks)	Holden Commodore (VX)
20	(Australia) Grant Johnson (Australia) Kerry Wade	Larkham Motorsport (Orrcon Steel)	Ford Falcon (AU)	75	(Australia) Anthony Tratt (Australia) Paul Stokell	Paul Little Racing (Toll Ipec)	Ford Falcon (BA)
021	(New Zealand) Craig Baird (New Zealand) Mark Porter	Team Kiwi Racing (Vodafone)	Holden Commodore (VX)	89	(Australia) Mal Rose (Australia) Grant Elliott	Sydney Star Racing (Gulf Western Oil)	Ford Falcon (AU)
21	(Australia) Brad Jones (Australia) John Bowe	Brad Jones Racing (OzEmail)	Ford Falcon (BA)	99	(New Zealand) David Thexton (Australia) Stephen Voight	Thexton Motor Racing (Thexton Health & Nutrition)	Ford Falcon (AU)
23	(Australia) Neal Bates (Australia) Rick Bates	Noske Motorsport (Safety Razor, INXS)	Ford Falcon (AU)	888	(United Kingdom) John Cleland (Australia) Andrew Jones	Brad Jones Racing (OzEmail)	Ford Falcon (BA)

== Practice ==
Practice summary
Session	No.	Driver	Team	Car	Time
Thursday
Practice 1	51	(New Zealand) Greg Murphy	K-Mart Racing Team	Holden Commodore (VY)	2:09.5801
Practice 2	51	(New Zealand) Greg Murphy	K-Mart Racing Team	Holden Commodore (VY)	2:08.3282
Friday
Practice 3	1	(Australia) Mark Skaife	Holden Racing Team	Holden Commodore (VY)	2:08.3215
Saturday
Practice 4	1	(Australia) Mark Skaife	Holden Racing Team	Holden Commodore (VY)	2:08.2145

== Qualifying ==
=== Qualifying ===
Pos.	No.	Driver	Team	Car	Time	Gap	Grid
1	51	(New Zealand) Greg Murphy	K-Mart Racing Team	Holden Commodore (VY)	2:07.9503		Top 10
2	1	(Australia) Mark Skaife	Holden Racing Team	Holden Commodore (VY)	2:07.9900	+0.0397	Top 10
3	21	(Australia) John Bowe	Brad Jones Racing	Ford Falcon (BA)	2:07.9945	+0.0442	Top 10
4	4	(Australia) Marcos Ambrose	Stone Brothers Racing	Ford Falcon (BA)	2:08.2685	+0.3182	Top 10
5	34	(Australia) Garth Tander	Garry Rogers Motorsport	Holden Commodore (VY)	2:08.4145	+0.4642	Top 10
6	11	(New Zealand) Steven Richards	Perkins Engineering	Holden Commodore (VY)	2:08.4695	+0.5192	Top 10
7	6	(Australia) Craig Lowndes	Ford Performance Racing	Ford Falcon (BA)	2:08.5267	+0.5764	Top 10
8	2	(New Zealand) Jim Richards	Holden Racing Team	Holden Commodore (VY)	2:08.6662	+0.7159	Top 10
9	65	(New Zealand) Paul Radisich	Triple Eight Race Engineering	Ford Falcon (BA)	2:08.6923	+0.7420	Top 10
10	17	(Australia) Steven Johnson	Dick Johnson Racing	Ford Falcon (BA)	2:08.7724	+0.8221	Top 10
11	31	(Australia) Steven Ellery	Steven Ellery Racing	Ford Falcon (BA)	2:08.7752	+0.8249	11
12	16	(Australia) Greg Ritter	Paul Weel Racing	Holden Commodore (VX)	2:08.8076	+0.8573	12
13	29	(Australia) Paul Morris	Paul Morris Motorsport	Holden Commodore (VY)	2:08.9158	+0.9655	13
14	18	(Brazil) Max Wilson	Dick Johnson Racing	Ford Falcon (BA)	2:08.9417	+0.9914	14
15	50	(Australia) Jason Bright	Paul Weel Racing	Holden Commodore (VX)	2:09.0336	+1.0833	15
16	8	(Australia) Paul Dumbrell	Perkins Engineering	Holden Commodore (VX)	2:09.1050	+1.1547	16
17	66	(Australia) Dean Canto	Triple Eight Race Engineering	Ford Falcon (BA)	2:09.1634	+1.2131	17
18	9	(Australia) Mark Winterbottom	Stone Brothers Racing	Ford Falcon (BA)	2:09.1900	+1.2397	18
19	888	(United Kingdom) John Cleland	Brad Jones Racing	Ford Falcon (BA)	2:09.4297	+1.4794	19
20	44	(New Zealand) Simon Wills	Team Dynamik	Holden Commodore (VY)	2:09.6021	+1.6518	20
21	10	(Australia) Jason Bargwanna	Larkham Motor Sport	Ford Falcon (BA)	2:09.6414	+1.6911	21
22	19	(Australia) David Besnard	Ford Performance Racing	Ford Falcon (BA)	2:09.6722	+1.7219	22
23	13	(Australia) Steve Owen	Robert Smith Racing	Holden Commodore (VX)	2:09.7946	+1.8443	23
24	15	(Australia) Cameron McLean	K-Mart Racing Team	Holden Commodore (VX)	2:09.8882	+1.9379	24
25	5	(Australia) Adam Macrow	Ford Performance Racing	Ford Falcon (BA)	2:10.1470	+2.1967	25
26	021	(New Zealand) Craig Baird	Team Kiwi Racing	Holden Commodore (VX)	2:10.3732	+2.4229	26
27	45	(France) Nicolas Minassian	Team Dynamik	Holden Commodore (VY)	2:10.5674	+2.6171	27
28	3	(Australia) Cameron McConville	Lansvale Smash Repairs	Holden Commodore (VX)	2:10.6251	+2.6748	28
29	23	(Australia) Neal Bates	Noske Motorsport	Ford Falcon (AU)	2:11.0820	+3.1317	29
30	75	(Australia) Anthony Tratt	Paul Little Racing	Ford Falcon (BA)	2:11.1015	+3.1512	30
31	72	(Australia) Alan Gurr	Robert Smith Racing	Holden Commodore (VX)	2:11.5992	+3.6489	31
32	33	(Australia) Nathan Pretty	Garry Rogers Motorsport	Holden Commodore (VX)	2:11.8451	+3.8948	32
33	20	(Australia) Grant Johnson	Larkham Motor Sport	Ford Falcon (AU)	2:12.4183	+4.4680	33
34	46	(Australia) Dale Brede	Holden Young Lions	Holden Commodore (VX)	2:12.6041	+4.6538	34
35	55	(Australia) José Fernández	Fernández Racing	Ford Falcon (AU)	2:14.7669	+6.8166	35
36	59	(Australia) Ron Searle	Phoenix Motorsport	Holden Commodore (VX)	2:14.9183	+6.9680	36
37	89	(Australia) Mal Rose	Sydney Star Motorsport	Ford Falcon (AU)	2:15.2302	+7.2799	37
38	69	(Australia) Peter Doulman	Doulman Automotive	Holden Commodore (VX)	2:15.7092	+7.7589	38
39	99	(New Zealand) David Thexton	Thexton Motor Racing	Ford Falcon (AU)	2:16.7246	+8.7743	39
DNQ	24	(Australia) Wayne Wakefield	Paul Morris Motorsport	Holden Commodore (VX)			

=== Top 10 Shootout ===
Pos	No	Team	Driver	Car	Time
Pole	51	K-Mart Racing Team	(New Zealand) Greg Murphy	Holden Commodore (VY)	2:06.8594
2	21	Brad Jones Racing	(Australia) John Bowe	Ford Falcon (BA)	2:07.9556
3	2	Holden Racing Team	(New Zealand) Jim Richards	Holden Commodore (VY)	2:08.1466
4	34	Garry Rogers Motorsport	(Australia) Garth Tander	Holden Commodore (VY)	2:08.4127
5	4	Stone Brothers Racing	(Australia) Marcos Ambrose	Ford Falcon (BA)	2:08.4442
6	6	Ford Performance Racing	(Australia) Craig Lowndes	Ford Falcon (BA)	2:08.4587
7	1	Holden Racing Team	(Australia) Mark Skaife	Holden Commodore (VY)	2:08.5696
8	17	Dick Johnson Racing	(Australia) Steven Johnson	Ford Falcon (BA)	2:08.6875
9	65	Briggs Motor Sport	(New Zealand) Paul Radisich	Ford Falcon (BA)	2:09.0925
DNS	11	Perkins Engineering	(New Zealand) Steven Richards	Holden Commodore (VY)	

* Greg Murphy became the first New Zealand born driver to actually set pole position for the Bathurst 1000. Murphy and fellow Kiwi racers Jim Richards and Paul Radisich had previously been on pole position for the race, but on each of those occasions it was their Australian co-driver who had set the pole winning time. Murphy's time of 2:06.8594 was the first time a touring car had gone under 2:07.00 for a lap of the 6.213 km (3.861 mi) circuit and was unofficially dubbed the "Lap of the Gods".
* Larry Perkins crashed the #11 Castrol Perkins Racing Holden Commodore (VY) during Practice 4, with the damage substantial enough to rule it out for the Top 10 Shootout.

=== Starting grid ===
The following table represents the final starting grid for the race on Sunday:

Inside row					Outside row				
1	(New Zealand) Greg Murphy (Australia) Rick Kelly	51			21	(Australia) John Bowe (Australia) Brad Jones			2
1	K-Mart Racing Team (Holden Commodore (VY))				Brad Jones Racing (Ford Falcon (BA))				2
3			(New Zealand) Jim Richards (Australia) Tony Longhurst	2			34	(Australia) Garth Tander (Australia) Jamie Whincup	4
3			Holden Racing Team (Holden Commodore (VY))				Garry Rogers Motorsport (Holden Commodore (VY))		4
5	(Australia) Marcos Ambrose (Australia) Russell Ingall	4			6	(Australia) Craig Lowndes (Australia) Glenn Seton			6
5	Stone Brothers Racing (Ford Falcon (BA))				Ford Performance Racing (Ford Falcon (BA))				6
7			(Australia) Mark Skaife (Australia) Todd Kelly	1			17	(Australia) Steven Johnson (Australia) Warren Luff	8
7			Holden Racing Team (Holden Commodore (VY))				Dick Johnson Racing (Ford Falcon (BA))		8
9	(New Zealand) Paul Radisich (Sweden) Rickard Rydell	65			11	(New Zealand) Steven Richards (Australia) Larry Perkins			10
9	Triple Eight Race Engineering (Ford Falcon (BA))				Perkins Engineering (Holden Commodore (VY))				10
11			(Australia) Steven Ellery (Australia) Luke Youlden	31			16	(Australia) Greg Ritter (Australia) Marcus Marshall	12
11			Steven Ellery Racing (Ford Falcon (BA))				Paul Weel Racing (Holden Commodore (VX))		12
13	(Australia) Paul Morris (New Zealand) John Faulkner	29			18	(Brazil) Max Wilson (Australia) David Brabham			14
13	Paul Morris Motorsport (Holden Commodore (VY))				Dick Johnson Racing (Ford Falcon (BA))				14
15			(Australia) Jason Bright (Australia) Paul Weel	50			8	(Australia) Paul Dumbrell (Australia) Tomas Mezera	16
15			Paul Weel Racing (Holden Commodore (VX))				Perkins Engineering (Holden Commodore (VX))		16
17	(Australia) Dean Canto (Australia) Matthew White	66			9	(Australia) Mark Winterbottom (Australia) Mark Noske			18
17	Triple Eight Race Engineering (Ford Falcon (BA))				Stone Brothers Racing (Ford Falcon (BA))				18
19			(United Kingdom) John Cleland (Australia) Andrew Jones	888			44	(New Zealand) Simon Wills (New Zealand) Jason Richards	20
19			Brad Jones Racing (Ford Falcon (BA))				Team Dynamik (Holden Commodore (VY))		20
21	(Australia) Jason Bargwanna (Australia) Mark Larkham	10			19	(Australia) David Besnard (Australia) Owen Kelly			22
21	Larkham Motor Sport (Ford Falcon (BA))				Rod Nash Racing (Ford Falcon (BA))				22
23			(Australia) Steve Owen (Australia) Phillip Scifleet	13			15	(United Kingdom) Andy Priaulx (Australia) Cameron McLean	24
23			Robert Smith Racing (Holden Commodore (VX))				K-Mart Racing Team (Holden Commodore (VX))		24
25	(Australia) Darren Hossack (Australia) Adam Macrow	5			021	(New Zealand) Craig Baird (New Zealand) Mark Porter			26
25	Ford Performance Racing (Ford Falcon (BA))				Team Kiwi Racing (Holden Commodore (VX))				26
27			(France) Nicolas Minassian (Denmark) Jan Magnussen	45			3	(Australia) Cameron McConville (Australia) Tim Leahey	28
27			Team Dynamik (Holden Commodore (VY))				Lansvale Smash Repairs (Holden Commodore (VX))		28
29	(Australia) Rick Bates (Australia) Neal Bates	23			75	(Australia) Anthony Tratt (Australia) Paul Stokell			30
29	Noske Motorsport (Ford Falcon (AU))				Paul Little Racing (Ford Falcon (BA))				30
31			(Australia) Alan Gurr (New Zealand) Jonny Reid	72			33	(Australia) Nathan Pretty (Denmark) Allan Simonsen	32
31			Robert Smith Racing (Holden Commodore (VX))				Garry Rogers Motorsport (Holden Commodore (VX))		32
33	(Australia) Grant Johnson (Australia) Kerry Wade	20			46	(Australia) Dale Brede (Australia) Tony Ricciardello			34
33	Larkham Motor Sport (Ford Falcon (AU))				Holden Young Lions (Holden Commodore (VX))				34
35			(Australia) José Fernández (Australia) David Russell	55			59	(Australia) Jamie Miller (Australia) Ron Searle	36
35			Fernández Racing (Ford Falcon (AU))				Phoenix Motorsport (Holden Commodore (VX))		36
37	(Australia) Mal Rose (Australia) Grant Elliott	89			69	(Australia) Robert Jones (Australia) Peter Doulman			38
37	Sydney Star Motorsport (Ford Falcon (AU))				Doulman Automotive (Holden Commodore (VX))				38
39			(New Zealand) David Thexton (Australia) Stephen Voight	99			24	(Australia) Wayne Wakefield (New Zealand) Andy McElrea	40
39			Thexton Motor Racing (Ford Falcon (AU))				Paul Morris Motorsport (Holden Commodore (VX))		40

== Race results ==
Pos	No	Team	Drivers	Car	Laps	Time/Retired	Grid	Points
1	51	K-Mart Racing Team	(New Zealand) Greg Murphy (Australia) Rick Kelly	Holden Commodore (VY)	161	6:32:55.4044	1	192
2	6	Ford Performance Racing	(Australia) Craig Lowndes (Australia) Glenn Seton	Ford Falcon (BA)	161	+4.9377	6	188
3	31	Steven Ellery Racing	(Australia) Steven Ellery (Australia) Luke Youlden	Ford Falcon (BA)	161	+8.4910	11	184
4	11	Perkins Engineering	(New Zealand) Steven Richards (Australia) Larry Perkins	Holden Commodore (VY)	161	+9.3615	10	180
5	2	Holden Racing Team	(New Zealand) Jim Richards (Australia) Tony Longhurst	Holden Commodore (VY)	161	+9.8725	3	176
6	4	Stone Brothers Racing	(Australia) Marcos Ambrose (Australia) Russell Ingall	Ford Falcon (BA)	161	+20.5635	5	172
7	65	Triple Eight Race Engineering	(New Zealand) Paul Radisich (Sweden) Rickard Rydell	Ford Falcon (BA)	161	+28.6114	9	168
8	1	Holden Racing Team	(Australia) Mark Skaife (Australia) Todd Kelly	Holden Commodore (VY)	161	+32.4087	7	164
9	888	Brad Jones Racing	(United Kingdom) John Cleland (Australia) Andrew Jones	Ford Falcon (BA)	160	+1 lap	19	160
10	21	Brad Jones Racing	(Australia) John Bowe (Australia) Brad Jones	Ford Falcon (BA)	159	+2 laps	2	156
11	45	Team Dynamik	(France) Nicolas Minassian (Denmark) Jan Magnussen	Holden Commodore (VY)	158	+3 laps	27	152
12	18	Dick Johnson Racing	(Brazil) Max Wilson (Australia) David Brabham	Ford Falcon (BA)	158	+3 laps	14	148
13	17	Dick Johnson Racing	(Australia) Steven Johnson (Australia) Warren Luff	Ford Falcon (BA)	156	+5 laps	8	144
14	8	Perkins Engineering	(Australia) Paul Dumbrell (Australia) Tomas Mezera	Holden Commodore (VX)	155	+6 laps	16	140
15	59	Phoenix Motorsport	(Australia) Jamie Miller (Australia) Ron Searle	Holden Commodore (VX)	155	+6 laps	36	136
16	99	Thexton Motor Racing	(New Zealand) David Thexton (Australia) Stephen Voight	Ford Falcon (AU)	153	+8 laps	39	132
17	021	Team Kiwi Racing	(New Zealand) Craig Baird (New Zealand) Mark Porter	Holden Commodore (VX)	149	+12 laps	26	128
18	20	Larkham Motor Sport	(Australia) Grant Johnson (Australia) Kerry Wade	Ford Falcon (AU)	148	+13 laps	33	124
19	34	Garry Rogers Motorsport	(Australia) Garth Tander (Australia) Jamie Whincup	Holden Commodore (VY)	146	+15 laps	4	120
20	3	Lansvale Smash Repairs	(Australia) Cameron McConville (Australia) Tim Leahey	Holden Commodore (VX)	144	+17 laps	28	116
21	13	Robert Smith Racing	(Australia) Steve Owen (Australia) Phillip Scifleet	Holden Commodore (VX)	141	+20 laps	23	112
22	44	Team Dynamik	(New Zealand) Simon Wills (New Zealand) Jason Richards	Holden Commodore (VY)	139	+22 laps	20	108
23	89	Sydney Star Motorsport	(Australia) Mal Rose (Australia) Grant Elliott	Ford Falcon (AU)	126	+35 laps	37	104
DNF	16	Paul Weel Racing	(Australia) Greg Ritter (Australia) Marcus Marshall	Holden Commodore (VX)	159	Radiator damage	12	100
DNF	66	Triple Eight Race Engineering	(Australia) Dean Canto (Australia) Matthew White	Ford Falcon (BA)	147	Engine	17	96
DNF	10	Larkham Motor Sport	(Australia) Jason Bargwanna (Australia) Mark Larkham	Ford Falcon (BA)	118		21	92
DNF	19	Ford Performance Racing; Rod Nash Racing	(Australia) David Besnard (Australia) Owen Kelly	Ford Falcon (BA)	115	Suspension	22	88
DNF	55	Fernández Racing	(Australia) José Fernández (Australia) David Russell	Ford Falcon (AU)	113	Not Classified	35	84
DNF	75	Paul Little Racing	(Australia) Anthony Tratt (Australia) Paul Stokell	Ford Falcon (BA)	106		30	80
DNF	9	Stone Brothers Racing	(Australia) Mark Winterbottom (Australia) Mark Noske	Ford Falcon (BA)	102	Engine	18	76
DNF	46	John Faulkner Racing; Holden Young Lions	(Australia) Dale Brede (Australia) Tony Ricciardello	Holden Commodore (VX)	72	Crash	34	
DNF	5	Ford Performance Racing	(Australia) Darren Hossack (Australia) Adam Macrow	Ford Falcon (BA)	63	Crash	25	
DNF	23	Noske Motorsport	(Australia) Rick Bates (Australia) Neal Bates	Ford Falcon (AU)	62	Engine	29	
DNF	50	Paul Weel Racing	(Australia) Jason Bright (Australia) Paul Weel	Holden Commodore (VX)	44	Crash	15	
DNF	33	Garry Rogers Motorsport	(Australia) Nathan Pretty (Denmark) Allan Simonsen	Holden Commodore (VX)	42	Crash	32	
DNF	15	K-Mart Racing Team	(United Kingdom) Andy Priaulx (Australia) Cameron McLean	Holden Commodore (VX)	33	Crash damage	24	
DNF	69	Doulman Automotive	(Australia) Robert Jones (Australia) Peter Doulman	Holden Commodore (VX)	32	Crash	38	
DNF	29	Paul Morris Motorsport	(Australia) Paul Morris (New Zealand) John Faulkner	Holden Commodore (VY)	5	Gearbox	13	
DNF	72	Robert Smith Racing	(Australia) Alan Gurr (New Zealand) Jonny Reid	Holden Commodore (VX)	4	Engine	31	
DNQ	24	Paul Morris Motorsport	(Australia) Wayne Wakefield (New Zealand) Andy McElrea	Holden Commodore (VX)	0			

== Statistics ==
- Provisional Pole Position - #51 Greg Murphy - 2:07.9503
- Pole Position - #51 Greg Murphy - 2:06.8594
- Fastest Lap - #34 Garth Tander - 2:08.6726 (new lap record)
- Race time of winning car - 6:32:55.4044
- Average speed of winning car - 153 km/h

== Broadcast ==
Network 10 broadcast the race for the seventh consecutive year, dating back to the 1997 5.0L race. This was the last commentary appearance at Bathurst for Mark Oastler since his first appearance in 1990.

Network 10
Host: Bill Woods
Booth: Neil Crompton, Mark Oastler, Matthew White
Pit-lane: Daryl Beattie, Grant Kenny, Greg Rust
