= Team Betta Electrical =

Team Betta Electrical may refer to these teams which competed in V8 Supercars with Betta Electrical as their title sponsor:

- John Faulkner Racing: 1996 - 1998
- Briggs Motor Sport: 2002 - 2003
- Paul Weel Racing: 2002
- Triple Eight Race Engineering: 2004 - 2006
