= David Krause =

Australian rugby league footballer and coach

Personal information
- Full name: David William Krause
- Born: 28 February 1970 (age 56) Ryde, Sydney

Playing information
- Height: 190 cm (6 ft 3 in)
- Weight: 94 kg (207 lb; 14 st 11 lb)
- Position: Centre
Club
Years	Team	Pld	T	G	FG	P
1995–96	South Queensland Crushers	23	10	0	0	40
1996–97	London Broncos	25	8	0	0	32
	Total	48	18	0	0	72
- Source: RLP

David Krause (born 28 February 1970) is a former professional rugby league footballer who played for South Queensland Crushers in the Australian Rugby League and London Broncos in the Super League.

== Playing career ==
Krause made his first grade debut in round 2 of the 1995 ARL season against Parramatta. Krause was an inaugural squad member with the South Queensland club in 1995. In 1996, Krause only played two games for the club as they finished with the Wooden Spoon. Krause went on to play for London in the Super League for one season.

== Post playing ==
After retiring, Krause moved into coaching and took charge at Lismore Marist Brothers Rams in the Northern Rivers Regional Rugby League. Krause then when to live in Brisbane and coached the East Tigers Under 20 team in (2013–2014).
