= Holden Commodore (VX) =

Australian full-size car

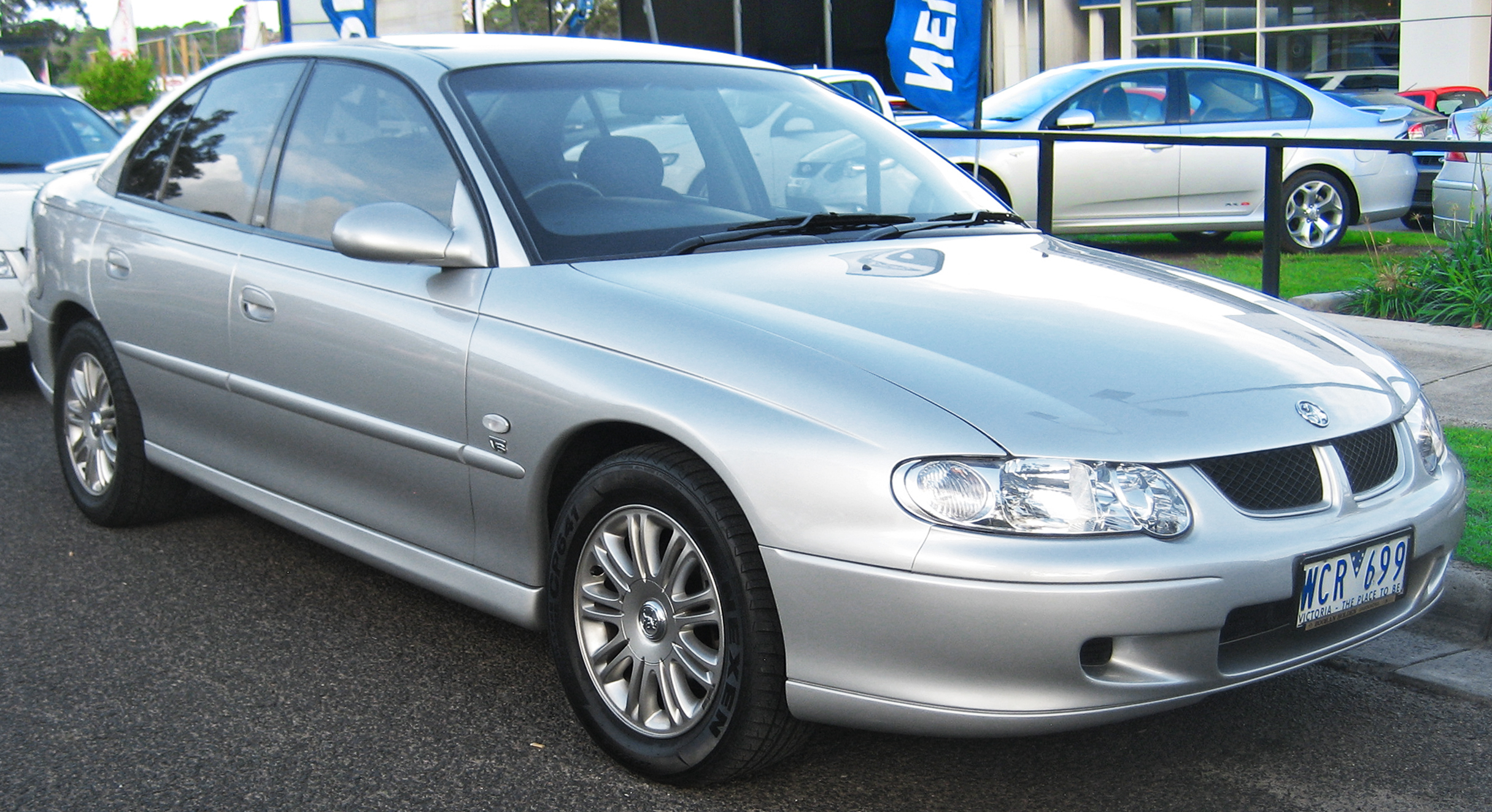
- 2001 Holden Commodore (VX II) Lumina sedan

Overview
- Manufacturer: Holden (General Motors)
- Also called: Chevrolet Lumina; Chevrolet Omega; Holden Ute; Holden Berlina; Holden Calais
- Production: October 2000 – September 2002 (sedans, wagons); October 2000 – May 2003 (WHII Statesman/Caprice); December 2000 – May 2003 (VU utility)
- Assembly: Australia: Adelaide, South Australia (Elizabeth)
- Designer: John Field, Mike Simcoe

Body and chassis
- Class: Full-size
- Body style: 2-door coupé utility (VU Ute); 4-door sedan 5-door station wagon
- Layout: Front engine, rear-wheel drive
- Platform: GM V platform
- Related: Opel Omega B Holden Monaro (V2); Holden Statesman/Caprice (WH); HSV VX and VU series CSV VX and VU series

Powertrain
- Engine: 3.8 L Ecotec L36 V6; 3.8 L Supercharged Ecotec L67 V6; 5.7 L Gen III LS1 V8
- Transmission: 4-speed GM 4L60-E automatic 5-speed Getrag 260 manual 6-speed Borg-Warner T-56 manual

Dimensions
- Wheelbase: 2,788 mm (109.8 in) (sedan); 2,938 mm (115.7 in) (wagon, utility)
- Length: 4,891 mm (192.6 in) (sedan); 5,046 mm (198.7 in) (wagon); 5,051 mm (198.9 in) (utility)
- Width: 1,842–1,847 mm (72.5–72.7 in)
- Height: 1,445–1,450 mm (56.9–57.1 in)
- Kerb weight: 1,519–1,648 kg (3,349–3,633 lb); 1,535 kg (3,384 lb) (utility)

Chronology
- Predecessor: Holden Commodore (VT)
- Successor: Holden Commodore (VY)

The Holden Commodore (VX) is a full-size car that was produced by Holden from 2000 to 2002, and 2000 to 2003 for Statesman/Caprice (WHII) and Holden Ute (VU) models. It was the second iteration of the third generation of the Commodore. Its range included the luxury variants, Holden Berlina (VX) and Holden Calais (VX), and it formed the basis for a new generation Holden Ute (VU) coupé utility and Holden Monaro (V2) coupé.

The VX series was produced between October 2000 and September 2002, as a minor restyling update to the VT series from 1997. It introduced greater model differentiation along with gains in crash safety. An intermediate Series II was launched in August 2001, featuring a revised suspension system among other changes.

== History of development ==
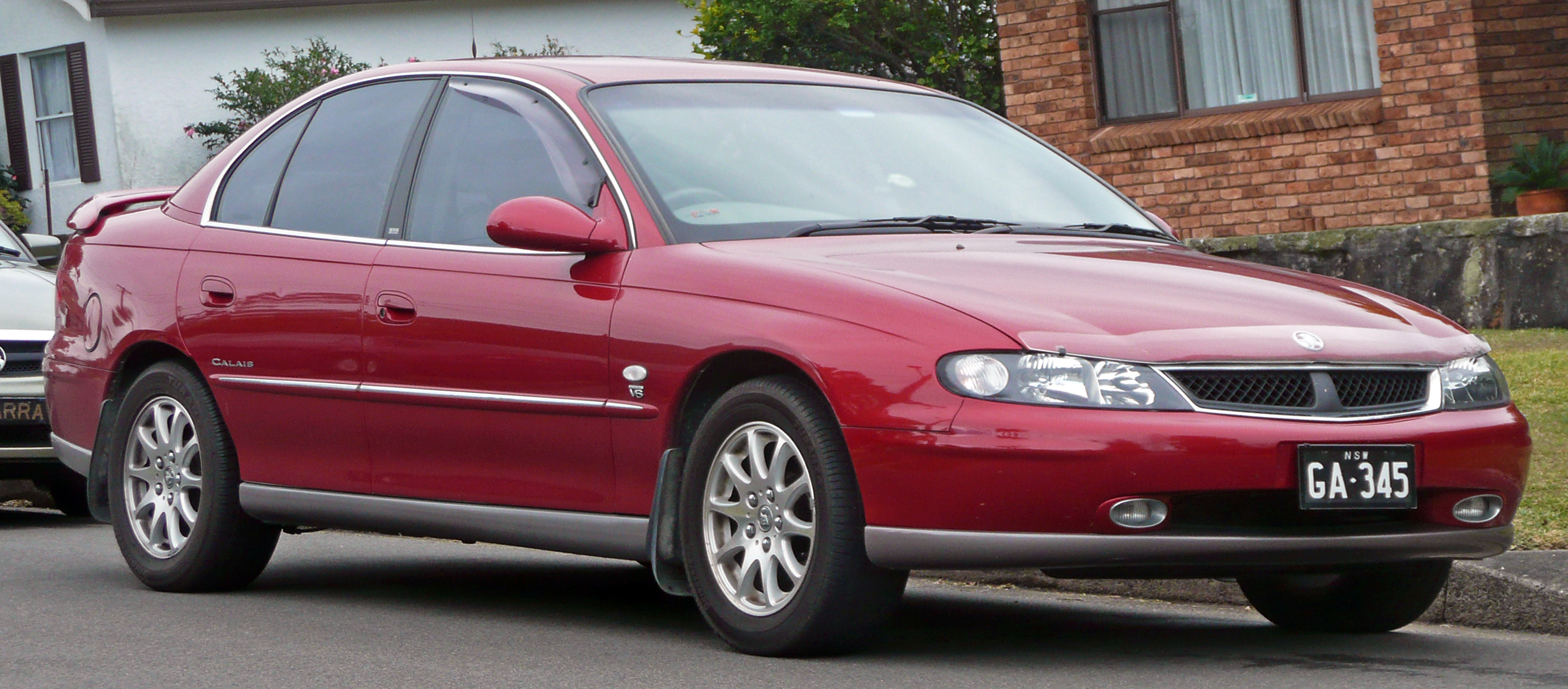
The unique frontal styling of the Berlina and Calais (pictured) feature a headlamp and grille conglomerate, as opposed to the separate assemblages on lower luxury levels.

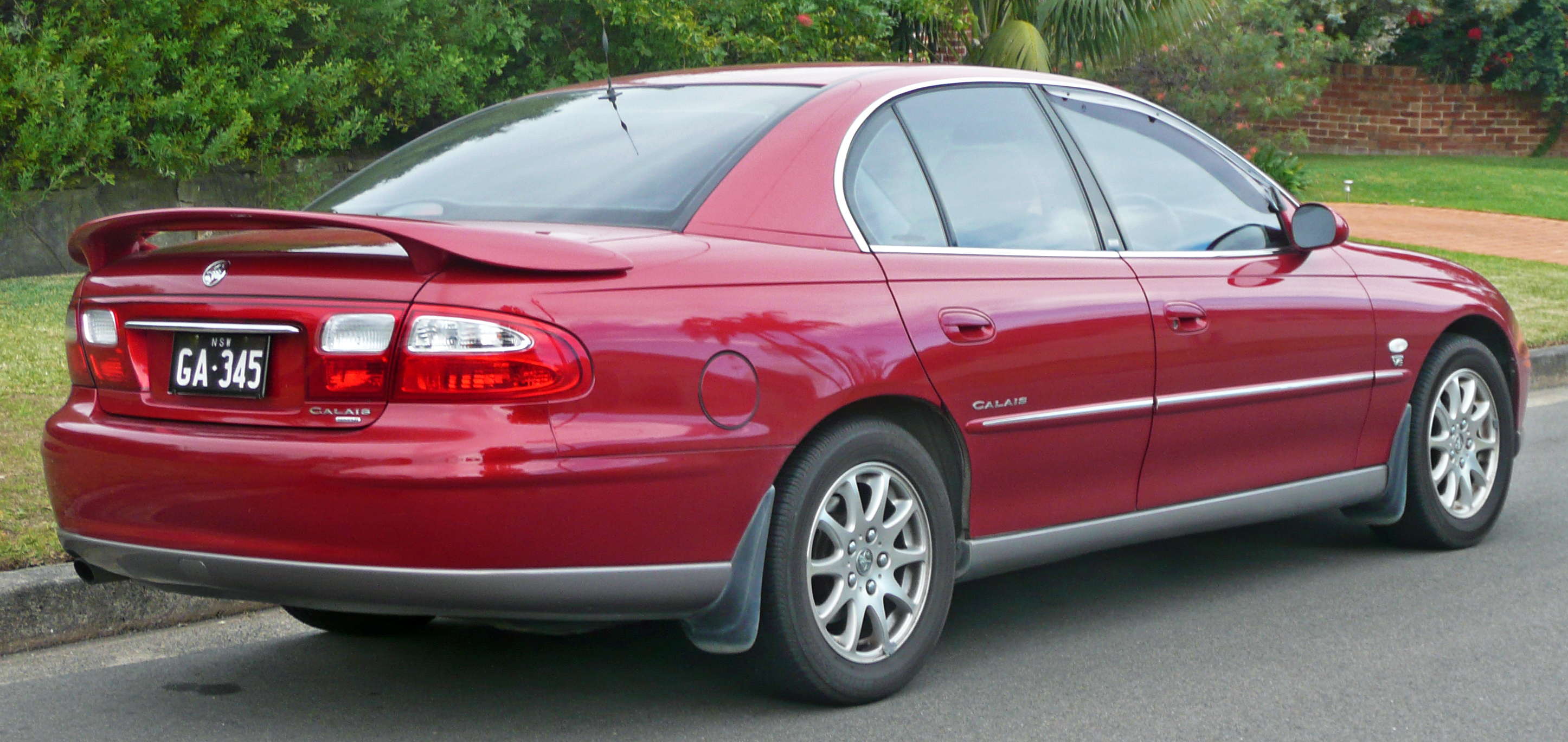
The full-width tail lamp panel featured on the Berlina and Calais (pictured) variants.

=== Design ===
Visually, the exterior features a revised headlamp design over the preceding VT among other changes. These include the tail lamp panel now replaced by two separate individual light assemblies. The Berlina and Calais sedans however retain the full-width boot-lid panel incorporating the tail lamps and the registration plate.

=== Safety ===
Safety played a substantial role in the development of the VX model. Bosch version 5.3 anti-lock brakes were made standard on all variants, a first for an Australian manufactured car; and traction control was made available on vehicles equipped with manual transmission. Extensive research was undertaken to reduce the effects from a side-impact collision through modification of the B-pillars. The risk presented by a side-impact collision in a VX fitted without side airbags is reduced by 50 percent when compared to a similarly specified VT model.

=== Engine and mechanicals ===
The VX series introduced further mechanical upgrades to the 3.8-litre Ecotec V6 engine, which received changes to the engine management computer to bring power up to 152 kilowatts (204 hp). Fuel economy was also improved over the previous model by three to four percent. The optional Supercharged Ecotec V6 extended its service to the Executive and Acclaim variants, with the 171-kilowatt (229 hp) output figure remaining unchanged from the VT. As well as the supercharged six-cylinder, an even more powerful 5.7-litre Chevrolet-sourced Gen III V8 engine was offered. The powerplant received power increases from 220 to 225 kilowatts (295 to 302 hp).

A modified front suspension setup received lower control arm pivot points. The Series II update featured the addition of a new rear cross member, revised rear control arm assemblies with new style bushing and toe-control links to the semi-trailing arm rear suspension to better maintain the toe settings during suspension movements, resulting in more predictable car handling, noticeably over uneven surfaces, and improved tyre wear.

Engine	Power	Torque	Transmission
3.791 L (3,791 cc) Ecotec V6	152 kW (204 hp)	305 N⋅m (225 lb⋅ft)	5-speed Getrag 260 manual; 4-speed GM 4L60-E automatic
3.791 L (3,791 cc) Supercharged Ecotec V6	171 kW (229 hp)	375 N⋅m (277 lb⋅ft)	5-speed Getrag 260 manual; 4-speed GM 4L60-E automatic
5.665 L (5,665 cc) Gen III V8	225 kW (302 hp)	460 N⋅m (339 lb⋅ft)	6-speed Borg-Warner T-56 manual; 4-speed GM 4L60-E automatic

== Models ==
=== Commodore Executive ===
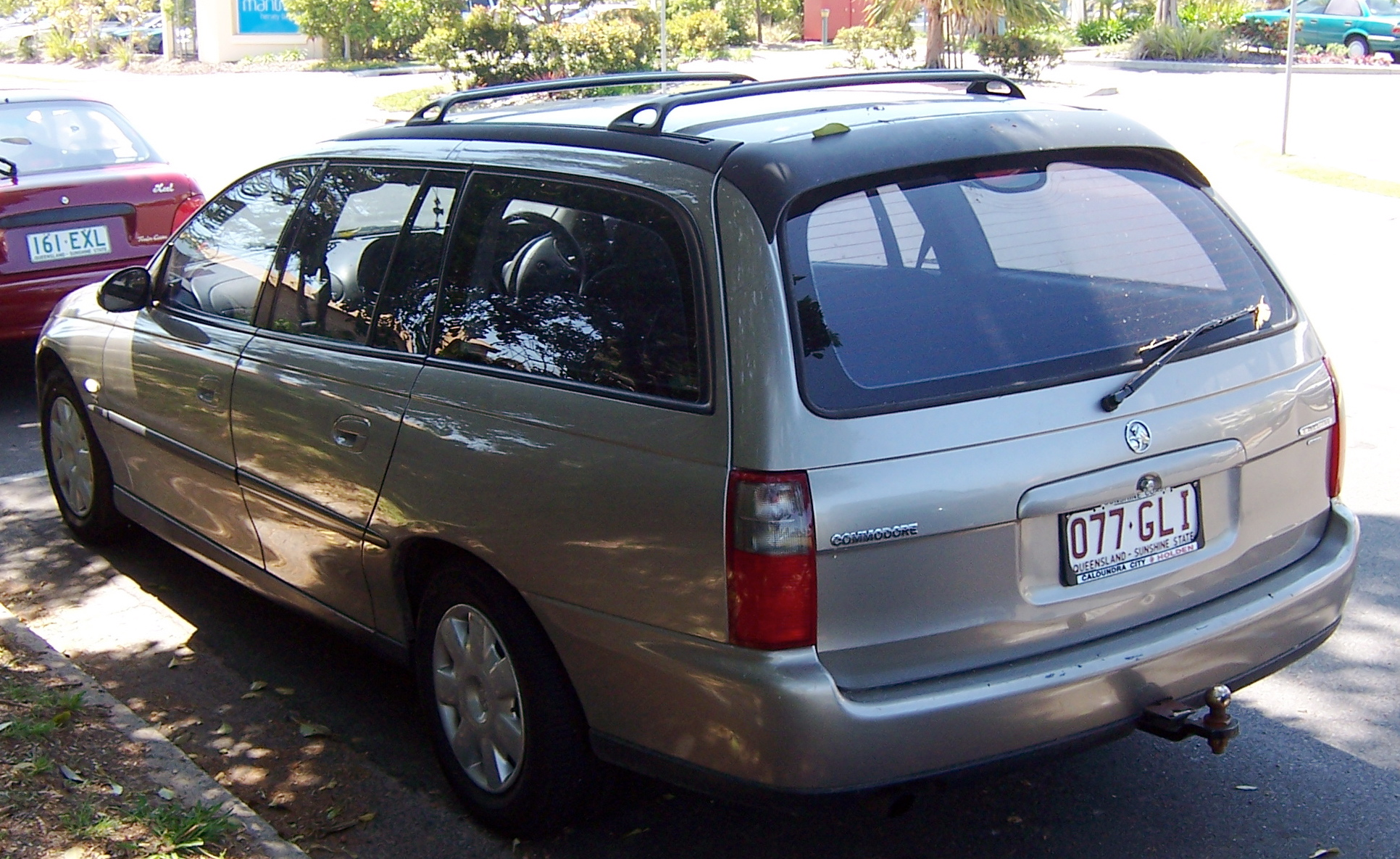
2001–2002 Holden Commodore (VX II) Executive station wagon

The entry-level Executive was a popular choice amongst fleet buyers, and offered standard features such as anti-lock brakes, a driver's air bag, trip computer, and central locking. Along with all other variants, steering wheel audio controls, a CD player, and an electrically retracting power antenna were now standard. The naturally aspirated 3.8-litre Ecotec V6 came standard on the Executive, with the option of the Supercharged Ecotec V6 or Gen III V8 engine. V6 engines were coupled to a five-speed manual transmission, and V8s came with a six-speed manual. A four-speed automatic transmission was available as an optional extra, regardless of the engine choice.

=== Commodore Acclaim ===
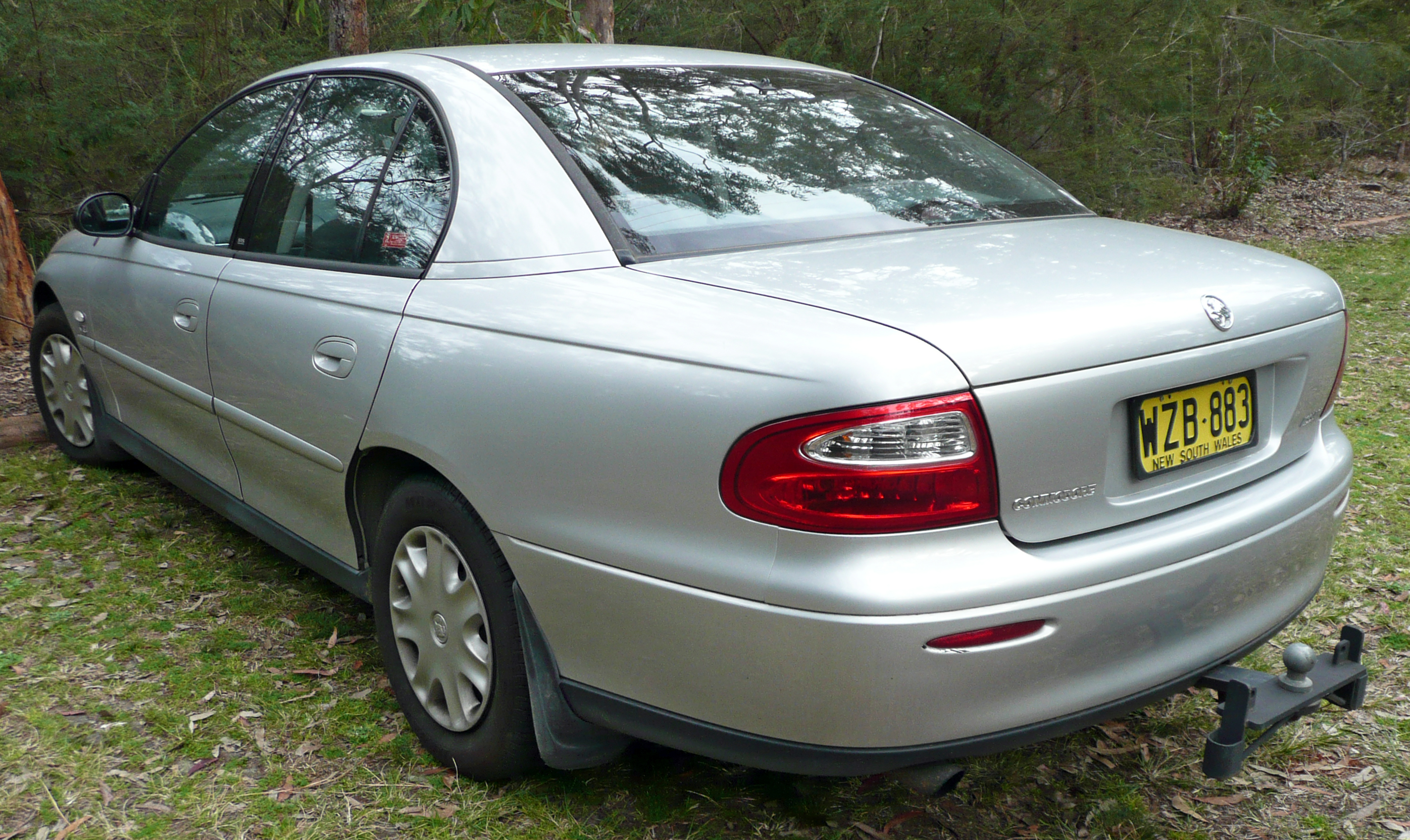
2000–2001 Holden Commodore (VX) Acclaim sedan

The second tier Acclaim was marketed as a family-oriented variation of the VX range, with a strong emphasis on safety. Building on the equipment levels of the Executive, the Acclaim also featured four airbags, cruise control, traction control, Limited-slip differential, air conditioning and power windows. A four-speed automatic transmission was the only transmission available, although buyers did have the opportunity to opt for the Supercharged Ecotec V6 engine.

=== Commodore S ===
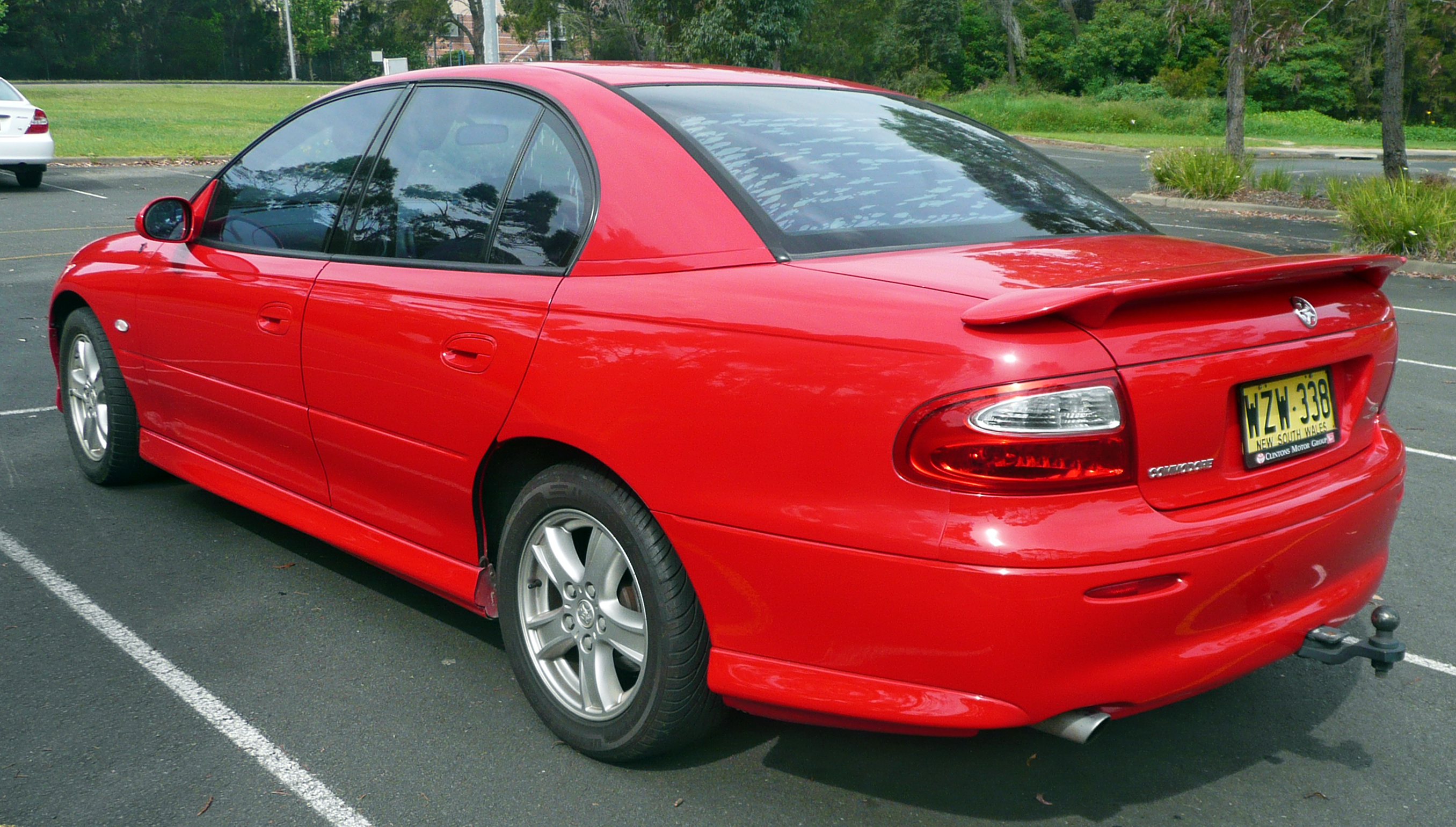
2000–2001 Holden Commodore (VX) S sedan

Offered as a sporty alternative to the Acclaim was the Commodore S. Based on the entry-level Executive, features came in the form of a sports body kit, electric windows, 16-inch alloy wheels, sports suspension, air conditioning, cruise control, and a leather steering wheel. However, leather upholstery, traction control, four airbags, 17-inch alloy wheels and the Supercharged Ecotec V6 were offered as options.

=== Commodore SS ===
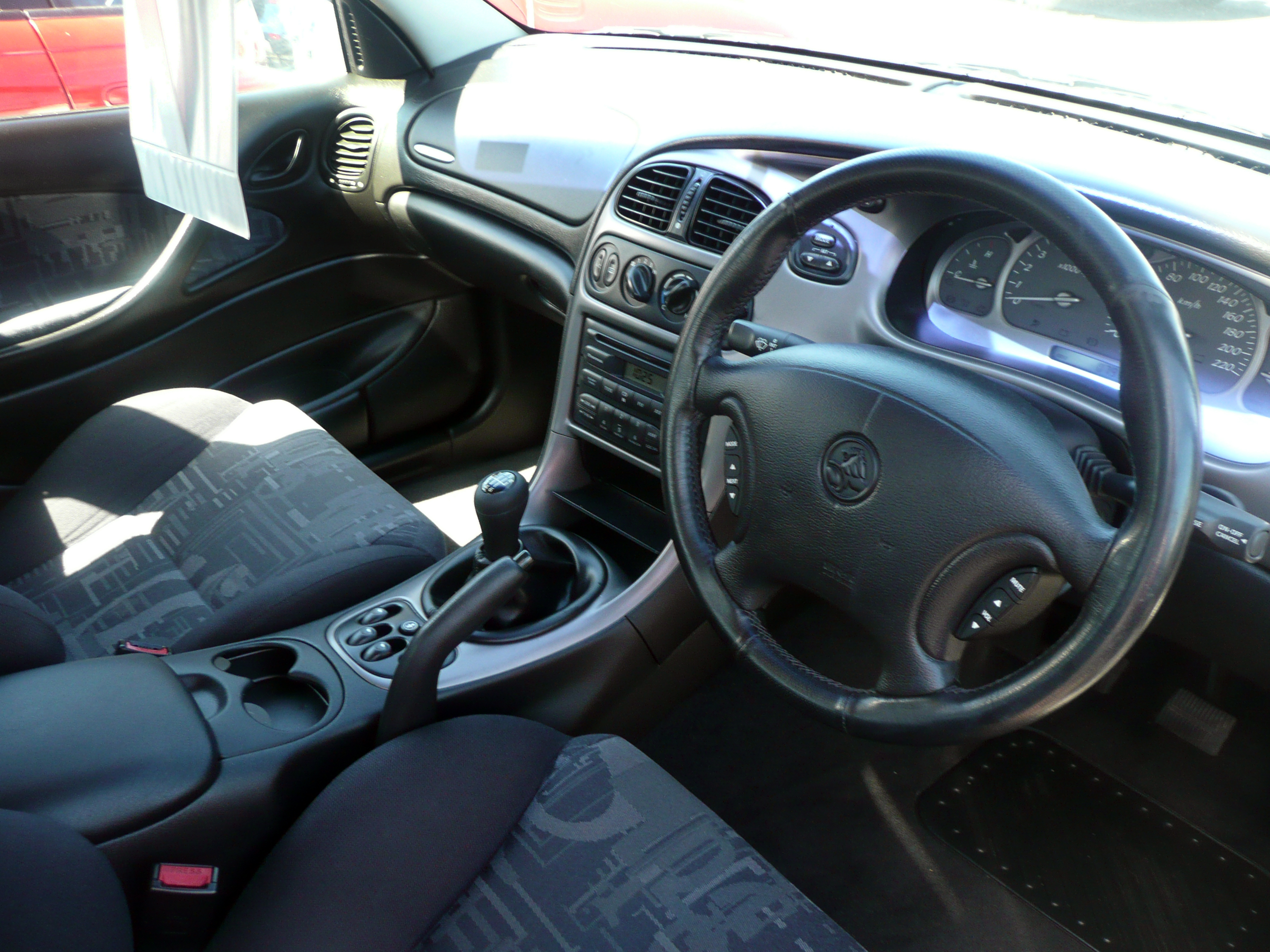
VX II Commodore SS interior with the satin dashboard veneer, sports-style upholstery and leather-wrapped steering wheel.

The SS continued on with the sporting trend of the Commodore S, but incorporated bumper-integrated foglamps, and more aggressively styled alloy wheels. Instead of the six-cylinder engine standard on the "S pack", a Gen III V8 engine and six-speed manual transmission came as standard. A more advanced suspension setup, traction control and a passenger's airbag were also standard, but side impact airbags and leather upholstery remained optional.

=== Berlina ===
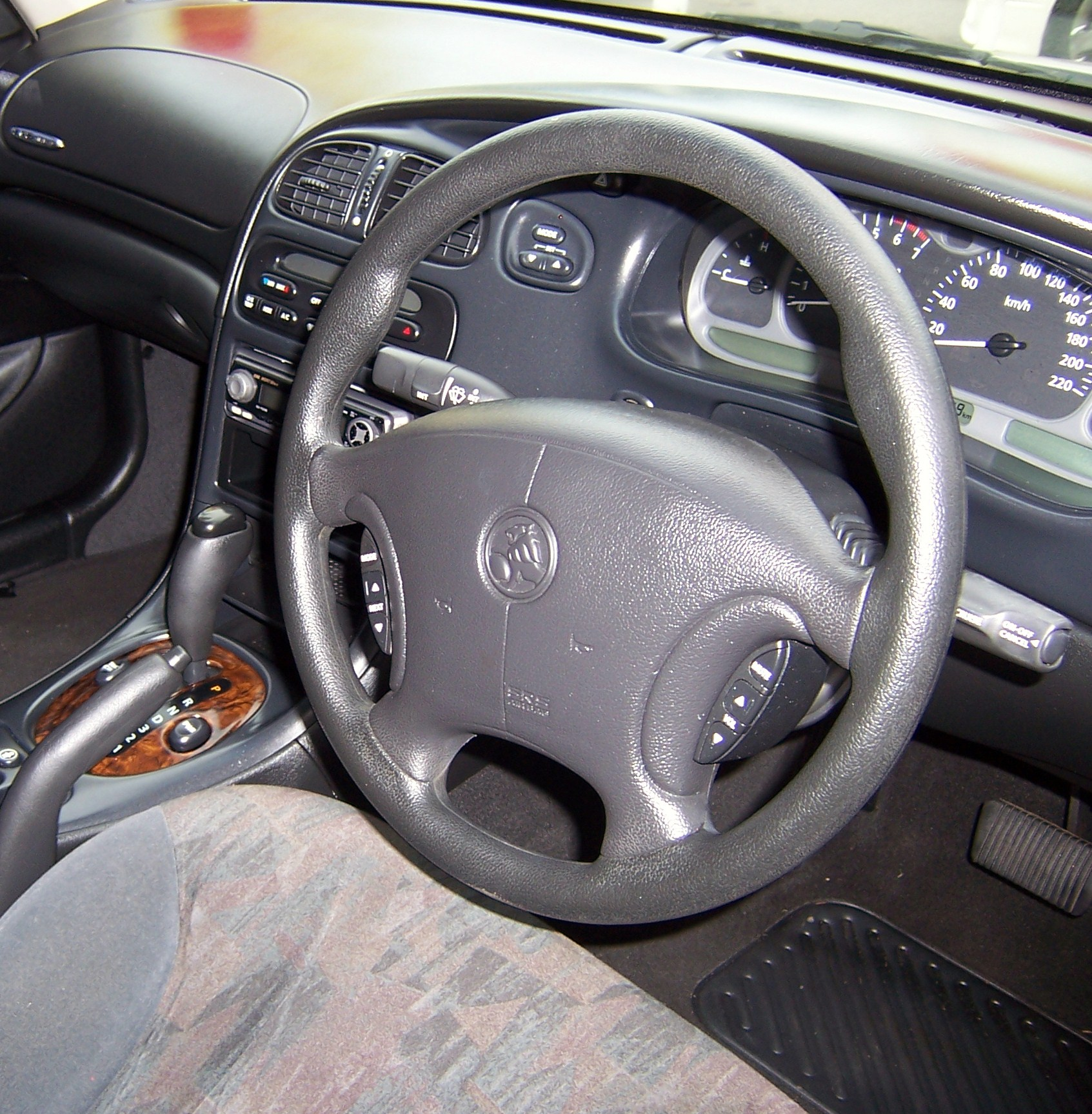
VX II Berlina interior displaying steering wheel command controls and a wood grain-faced transmission selection lever.

This model and the top-of-the-range Calais attributed a notably restyled exterior, when compared to other trim levels. Both featured a full-width rectangular grille, which merged off together with the angled-off headlamps. The rear-end of the sedan is characterised by a boot panel housing the a full-width taillight bar with transparent lenses. Alloy wheels for the Berlina were a nine-spoke, 15-inch, machine finished type.

Building on the features the Acclaim featured the Berlina added climate control air conditioning, and adjustable seatbelt anchors. Optional extras comprised: 17-inch alloy wheels, sports suspension (the same type found on the SS), limited-slip differential and the V8 engine.

=== Calais ===
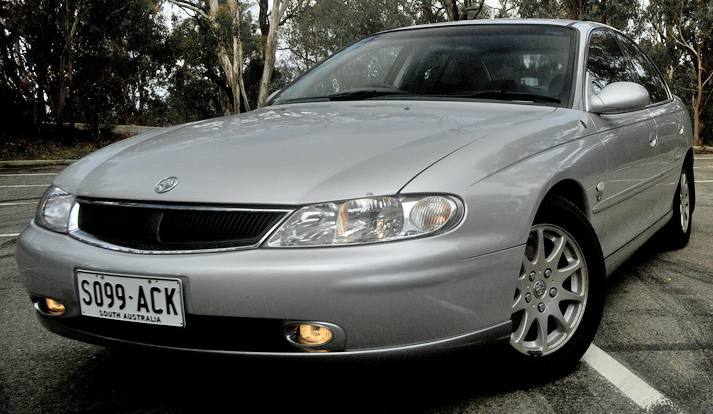
2000 Holden Commodore (VX) Calais sedan

The flagship Calais shares its exterior styling with the Berlina, but is distinguishable by its 16-inch alloy wheels and chrome outlined foglamps. Standard features above Berlina included an eight-speaker audio system, ten stack CD player, dual zone automatic climate control, electric front seats and leather steering wheel, gear shifter and handbrake. The Calais presented the same optional features as the Berlina, but allowed for the inclusion of leather upholstery. With the Berlina, the centre console was finished with either the black or beige plastic panel depending on the interior colour scheme, however the Calais upped the ante with a wood grain-faced console, or a satin-finished façade for Series II variants. The Calais was the only model in the lineup that could be had with all three engines, with the Ecotec V6 standard and the supercharged V6 and V8 as options. Manual transmissions were not available.

== Ute (VU) ==
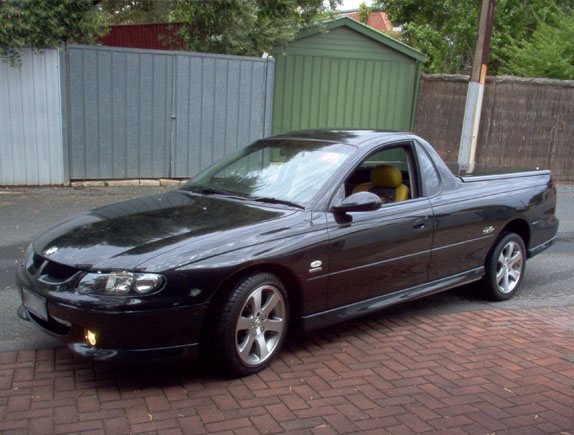
2001–2003 Holden Ute (VU II) SS

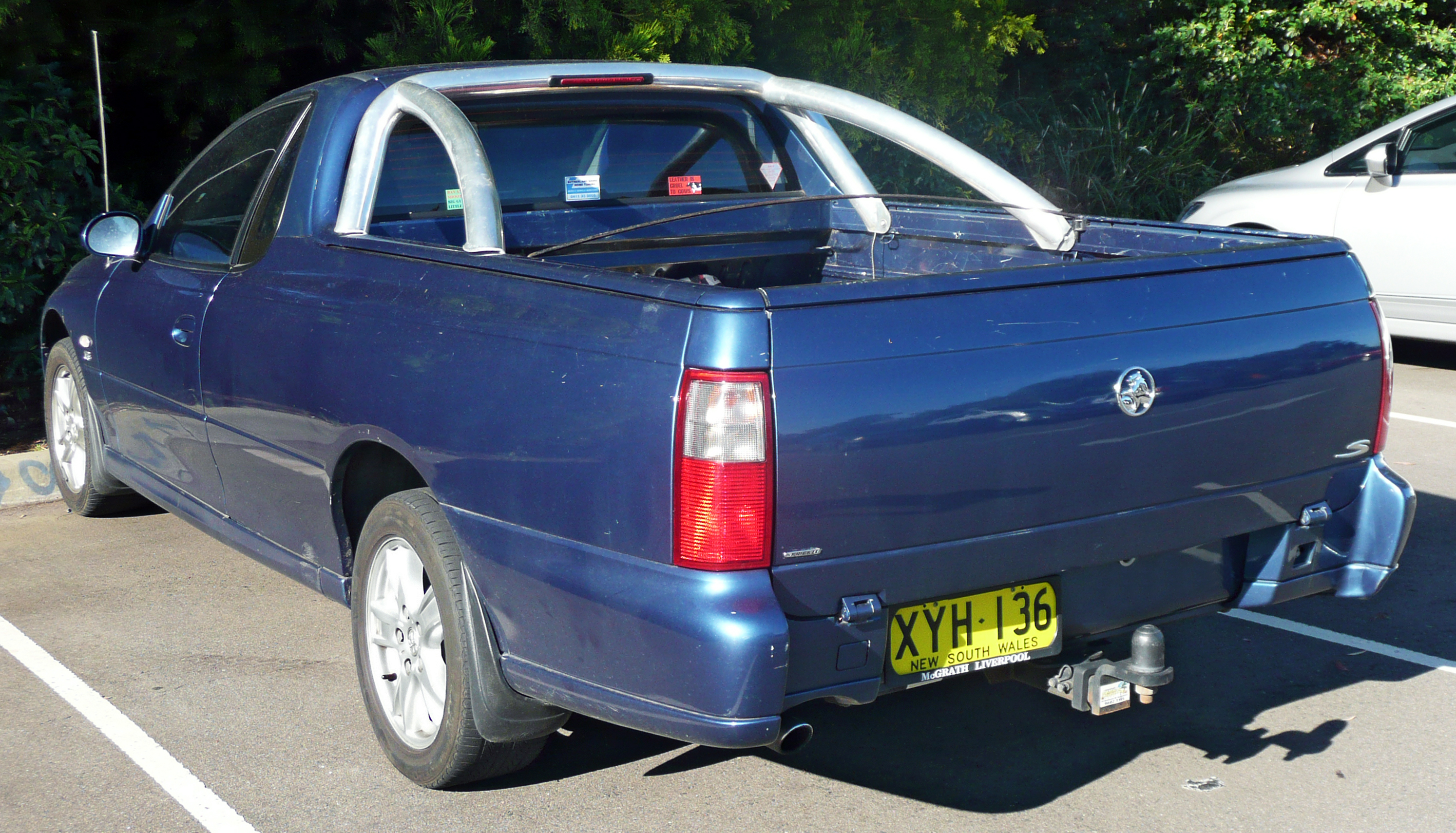
2001–2003 Holden Ute (VU II) S

Before the VU, Holden had marketed their Commodore-based utility models under the Holden Utility (VG) and Holden Commodore utility (VP, VR, VS) names, although the term "Holden Ute" was also used in their official marketing literature. The VU Ute's successor was assigned the same model code as the sedan it is based on (VY).

Models

The VU replaced the VS Utility. The VU's arrival was 36 months after the VT Commodore sedan, meaning it arrived in time for the launch of the VX Commodore. The VU utilises the same wheelbase as the VT Commodore station wagon and WH Statesman/Caprice, meaning a wheelbase increase of 116 mm (4.6 in). The Ute employs the same interior as the Commodore, while also picking up the VX's upgraded equipment lists and restyled exterior design.

- Base : Built up from the Commodore Executive's specification. Available with 3.8-litre 152 kW (204 hp) Ecotec V6 – 4-speed automatic, 5-speed manual or 5.7-litre 225 kW (302 hp) Generation III V8 – 6-speed manual or 4-speed auto
- S : Based on Commodore S specifications. Available with 3.8-litre 152 kW (204 hp) Ecotec V6 – 4-speed auto, 5-speed manual.
- SS : Based on Commodore SS specifications, minus side-impact airbags. Available with a 5.7-litre 225 kW (302 hp) Generation III V8 – 6-speed manual or 4-speed automatic.

The range received a minor refresh with the VU series II, releasing alongside the VX Series II.

The VU was superseded by the VY ute in May 2003.

Special editions

- SS Fifty: In October 2001, a special edition 'SS Fifty' model was released to mark the 50th anniversary of the introduction of the first "Holden Ute", the Holden 50-2106 coupe utility. Only 500 SS Fifty's were built and were identical in terms of colour scheme, all 500 units were released with a black exterior and a partial leather interior that contained plenty of "hyper yellow" accents. Other items that made the SS 50 different were the chrome sports bar on the back, unique black-and-yellow engine cover, a leather-wrapped steering wheel, handbrake cover and gear knob as well as a colour-coded instrument cluster to match the leather bolsters on the sports seats.

== HSV range ==
The enhanced performance VX and VX Series II range sold by Holden Special Vehicles (HSV) comprised the variants listed below.

=== Clubsport ===
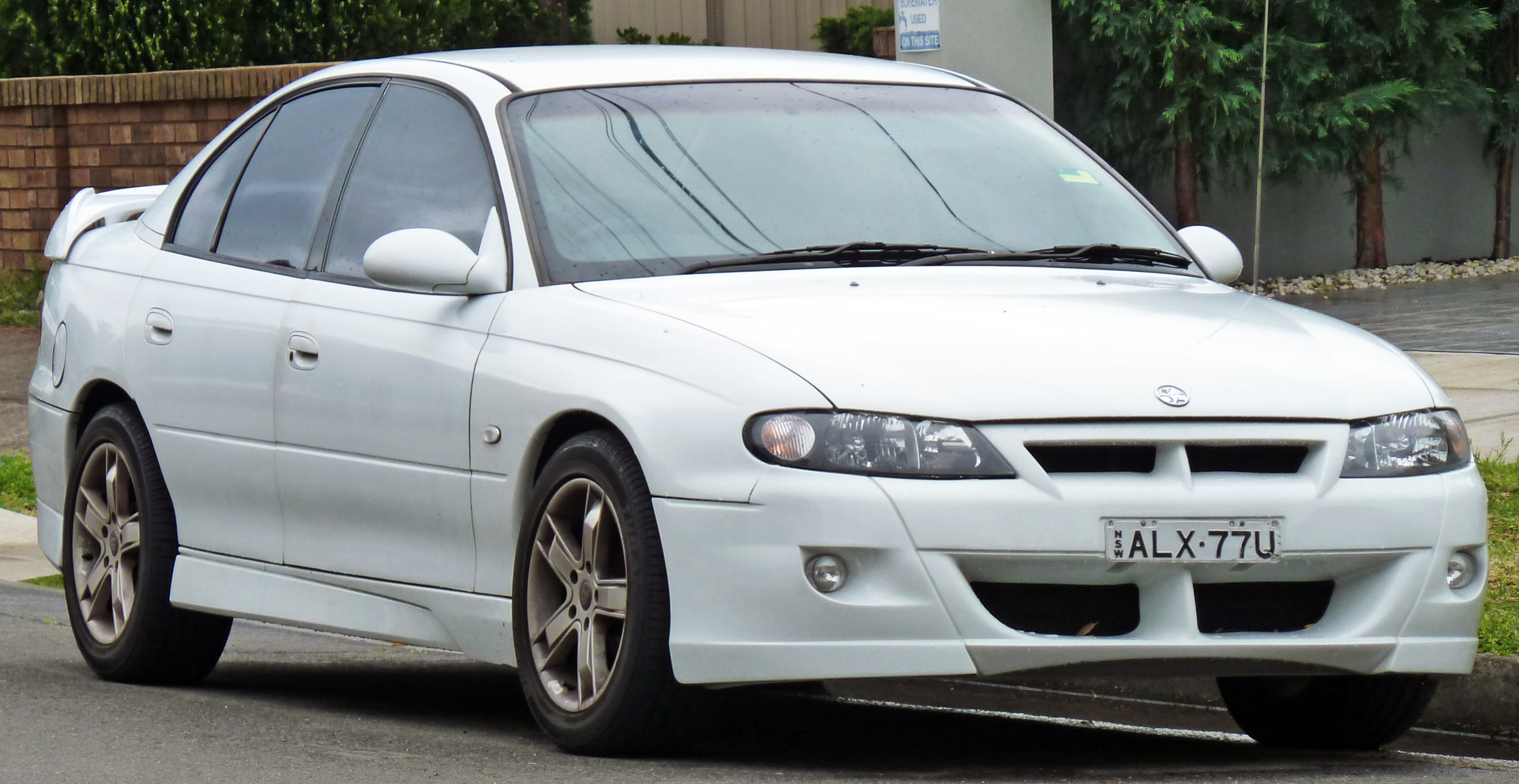
VX Clubsport

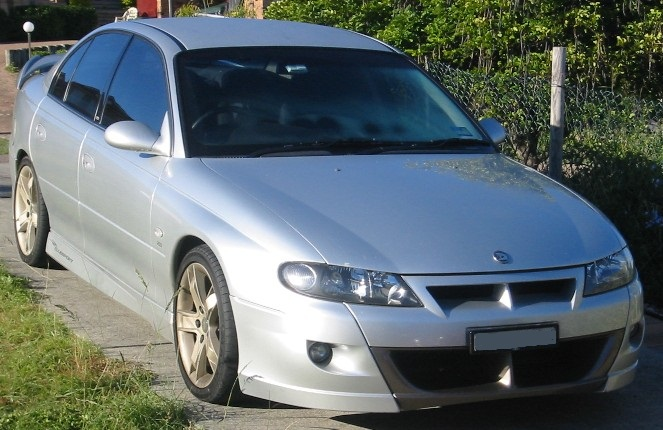
VX II Clubsport R8

The VX Clubsport was launched in October 2000 and featured the same V8 engine as the Clubsport VT Series II, but with an increased power output, up by 5 kW (7 PS; 7 hp) to 255 kW (347 PS; 342 hp). During the development of the VX Clubsport, HSV responded to many customers' complaints regarding how Clubsports were difficult to distinguish from standard Holden Commodores. The changes due to this included a more flamboyant, unique bodykit and exclusive HSV interior features.

=== GTS ===
- Series 1 VX GTS – 112 produced
- Series 2 VX SV300 (rebadged GTS)

=== Maloo ===
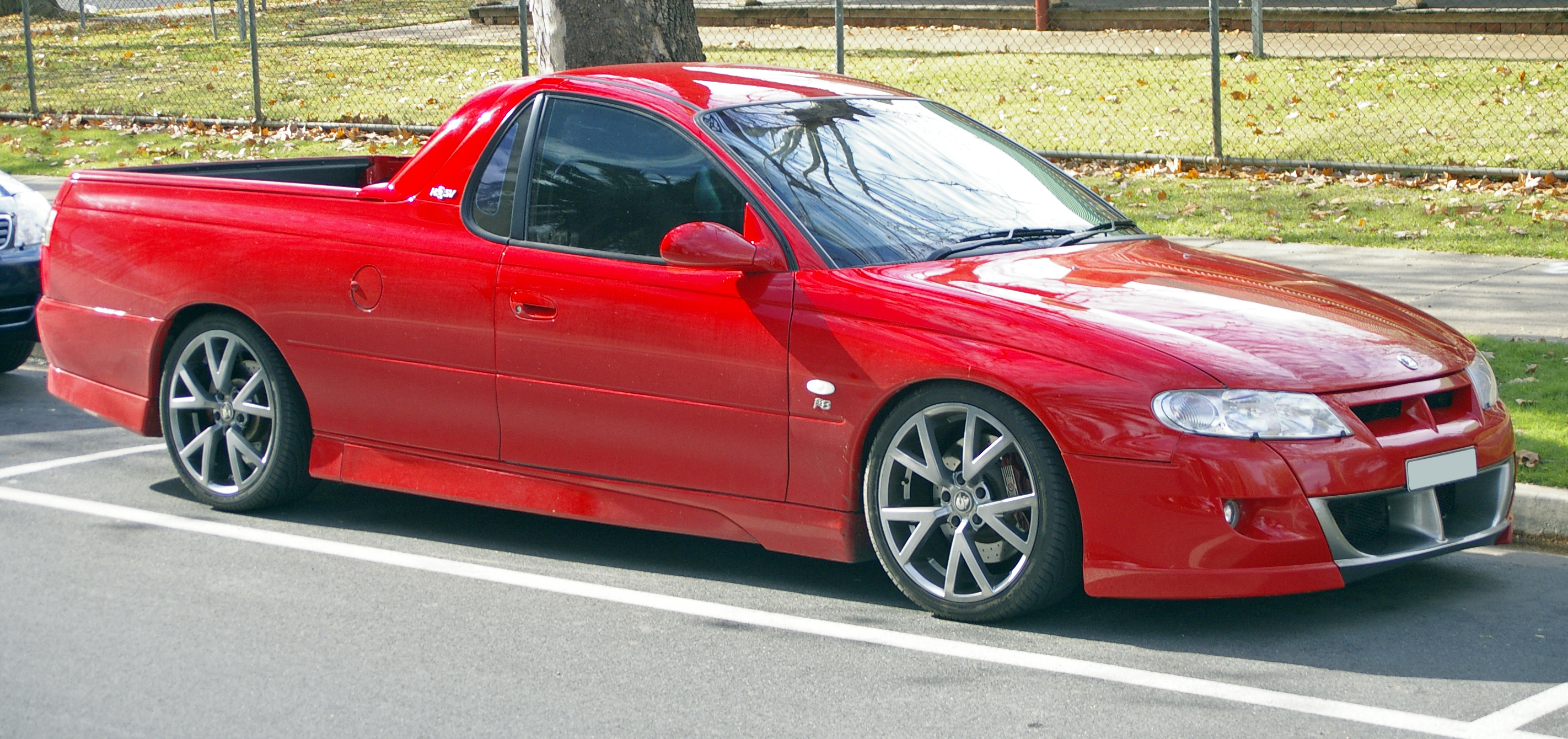
2001–2003 HSV Maloo (VUII) R8

In September 2000, the long-lived VS series Maloo utility was finally retired and replaced, from March 2001, by an all-new VU series that mirrored the existing VX series HSV sedans. The VU Maloo featured the same LS1 5.7 litre V8 engine as in the VX ClubSport with 255 kW (342 hp). Mirroring the sedan range, the HSV VU ute was now also available as Maloo R8, which featured standard 'Performance' brakes and a hard tonneau cover with raised rear wing. Overall, 301 examples were produced of the first series VU Maloo.

HSV's VU Series 2 Maloo was introduced in October 2001 in concert with the VX Series II sedans, with minor cosmetic upgrades that included 'blackout' style headlights and additional Maloo range paint colours of Delft blue and HSV Racing green. This upgrade also introduced new security measures in the form of "HSV DNA", which was a micro 'DataDot' component identification system. Overall, 483 examples of VU Series II were produced, including a "15th Anniversary" limited edition launched in June 2002 (with 25 units for Australia and another 5 for New Zealand).

=== Senator ===
The 2000 model underwent a facelift featuring more angular styling and a distinctive 'eggcrate' grille while, mechanically, the VX Series II added toe-control links to the IRS (in line with the Series II update of the Holden Commodore), as well as Microdot technology to deter theft. Most of the main changes to the VX Senator are mostly exterior changes, with visual styling was again designed by former Tom Walkinshaw Racing (TWR) designer Ian Callum. These changes included a chrome grille accent, crossed hatch lower grille, roof spoiler and a discreet boot mounted spoiler. Power increased by 5 kW (7 hp) for the now 255 kW (342 hp) LS1 V8. The VX Senator was partly based on the Holden Calais at the time. Electronic Traction Control comes as a standard option. It featured a 10-stacker CD player, two subwoofers with a premium sound system, four airbags, automatic climate control, cruise control, power mirrors and windows.

For the first time the Senator line up features rear parking sensors which beep when close to an object while reversing. An optional satellite navigation system and sunroof were available. The four speed automatic transmission is retained and for brakes there are two front ventilated discs and standard non-ventilated discs at the rear. Some of the dimensions are as follows: length is 4,964 mm (195.4 in), width 1,842 mm (72.5 in), height 1,450 mm (57.1 in) and the wheelbase dimension is 2,788 mm (109.8 in). The Senator weighs 1,710 kg (3,770 lb) and uses 18.1/100 km of fuel through the city, the fuel tank capacity is 75 litres. Once again the self-levelling rear suspension featured and part of the entertainment package a 6 stacker CD player and 8-speaker sound system was added. ABS and traction control was added for extra safety. Throughout the cabin there is leather trim and dark wood grain on the dashboard. Some extra options that were also available at extra cost was the premium brakes, Satellite navigation, leather-pewter and an upgraded entertainment sound system.

=== Senator 300 ===
This car was released in 2001 with the VX, continuing on into the Y series. Some features that come standard are 10 stacker CD system, 8 way power controls for the front seats, woodgrain instruments, electric windows, automatic climate control, ABS and front and side airbags. The Senator 300 was presented to the public at the Melbourne international motor show. Only 33 cars were built and 7 of the 33 built were to go on sale in New Zealand. The engine is a Callaway-tuned V8 that produces 300 kW (402 hp) of power and is only available with a 6-speed manual gearbox. ABS and a cross-drilled premium brake system were fitted inside 10 spoke 18" chrome shadow wheels. Acceleration from 0–100 km/h (0–62 mph) takes 6.1 seconds, and it can reach 400 meters (1/4 mile) in under 14.7 seconds.

=== XU6 ===
Introduced in September 2000, the VX XU6 was powered by the 3.8-litre L67 supercharged V6 producing 180 kW (241 hp) of power at 5000 rpm and 380 N⋅m (280 lb⋅ft) of torque at 3200 rpm. These figures were unchanged from the previous model VT XU6 and like the VT XU6, the only transmission available was the 4L60-E 4 speed automatic unit. Standard features on the XU6 included but weren't limited to; 17-inch alloy wheels, six speaker sound with CD player, climate control air conditioning, cruise control, four-way powered driver seat, front fog lights, leather wrapped steering wheel, four airbags and an immobilizer. This was the last HSV vehicle that the XU6 nameplate was used on.

== Exports ==
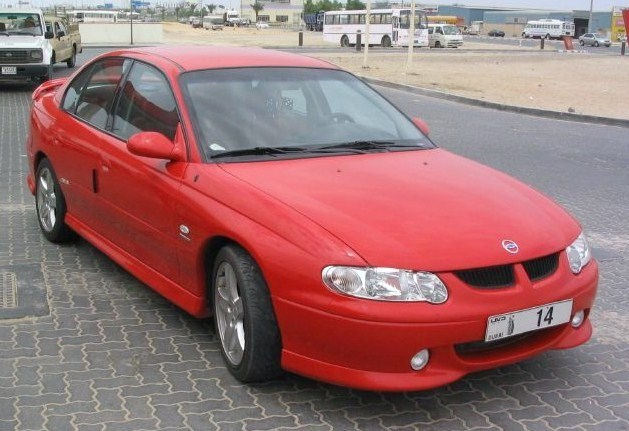
Chevrolet Lumina SS

Exports of the VX were made to the Middle East as the Chevrolet Lumina from 2000 as per the previous VT series. Trim levels were the Lumina LS sedan and wagon (based on Commodore Executive), Lumina LTZ sedan (Berlina), and Lumina SS sedan (Commodore SS).

General Motors do Brasil imported the VX as the Chevrolet Omega from 2001 to replace the VT-based Omega. This update was announced 18 May 2001. The Brazilian model sold as a single-specification CD model, based on the Holden Calais. VX Omega sales ended in 2003 when replaced by the VY-based model, as announced on 28 April 2003. The Omega, while based on the Calais specification, featured the boot lid from the more basic model VXs without the tail lamps extending into the boot lid.
