= Betta Home Living =

Australian consumer electronics retail franchise

Betta
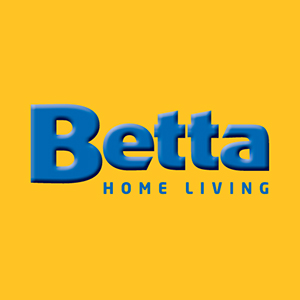
- Formerly: B.E.T.T.A.; Betta Electrical; Betta Home Living
- Industry: Retail
- Founded: 1961
- Headquarters: Brisbane, Queensland
- Number of locations: 144 (2026)
- Area served: Australia
- Key people: Derek Haley (interim CEO, appointed 1 March 2026)
- Products: Whitegoods, small appliances, consumer electronics, air conditioning, outdoor furniture, fridges, freezers, ovens, furniture, bedding
- Parent: BSR Group
- Website: www.betta.com.au

Betta (formerly Betta Electrical and Betta Home Living) is an Australian independent retail franchise group selling home appliance and furniture. It has been owned by BSR Group since November 2006, whose headquarters are based near Brisbane Airport, in the Da Vinci Educational and Industrial precinct, Queensland. Betta operates more than 140 stores across Australia.

== History ==
=== Origins (1959–1961) ===
In 1959, three local independent electrical retailers (Crystal Radio at East Brisbane, Hess & Ferguson at Wynnum and Laings Electrical at Red Hill) came together to combat rival electrical retail groups and formed the Brisbane Electrical Television Traders Association (BETTA). By 1961, the association had grown to seven independent members and was formally incorporated as Betta Stores Pty Ltd. Within three years, membership had expanded to more than 50 retailers, at which point the organisation converted to a public company, Betta Stores Ltd (BSL), a business structure that supported both Betta Electrical-branded and non-branded independent retailers throughout the 1990s.

=== Administration and formation of BSR Group (2006–2007) ===
In late 2006, Betta Stores Ltd was placed into administration amid mounting competition and financial pressure. Following the administration, 48 of the remaining Betta store owners banded together to acquire the registered brand and formed the BSR Group, preserving the Betta network under member ownership.

=== Rebranding and expansion (2008–2023) ===
In July 2008, the Betta Home Living brand was created, and over the following years more than 160 stores were progressively rebranded under the new identity. In April 2013, the transition from Betta Electrical to Betta Home Living was formally completed.

In 2023, the brand underwent further simplification, with all stores rebranded simply as Betta.

=== Corporate structure ===
Betta operates as a franchise group under the BSR Group, an Australian buying group in the home appliance, furniture, and bedding retail and commercial industries pursuing a five-year plan to exceed $1 billion in retail sales. Each store is independently owned and operated by local community members.

The BSR Group's portfolio of retail brands includes Betta, Designer Appliances, Furniture Zone, Stan Cash, and Billy Guyatts, along with RT Edwards Commercial.

In March 2026, then-CEO Gavin Carter moved into a newly created chief growth officer role, with Derek Haley appointed interim CEO to focus on operational efficiency and sustainable growth.

==== Key milestones under BSR Group ====
Year	Milestone
2008	Betta Home Living brand created; furniture division launched
2011	BSR Group joins the Narta buying group (1 April); Graeme Cunningham appointed CEO
2017	First BSR corporate store opens at Underwood, Queensland
2020	BSR acquires R.T. Edwards Commercial
2021	BSR acquires Stan Cash (effective July 2021); joint venture with Whitford's Designer Appliances
2022	BSR launches its own branded product range, Norj; Gavin Carter appointed CEO
2024	BSR acquires three Begents stores in Tasmania
2026	Derek Haley appointed interim CEO, effective 1 March

== Products ==
Betta stocks a wide range of products across multiple categories, including whitegoods (refrigerators, washing machines, dryers, dishwashers), small appliances (kitchen appliances, personal care, and home essentials), consumer electronics (televisions, audio, computing), and furniture and bedding.

Betta carries products from more than 100 brands, including Samsung, LG, Electrolux, Westinghouse, Panasonic, Beko, and Fisher & Paykel.

== Awards and recognition ==
Betta has consistently received recognition for customer satisfaction from the independent ratings firm Canstar Blue.

In 2021, Betta won the Canstar Blue Most Satisfied Customers award for electronics retailers, receiving five-star ratings for both Customer Service and Overall Satisfaction, and four-star ratings across all other categories including value for money, product range, pricing, and store/website layout.

In 2025, Canstar Blue research (finalised December 2025) again rated Betta as the top electronics retailer in Australia, awarding five stars across all categories: value for money, customer service, store and website, checkout experience, product range, and overall satisfaction.

Betta Home Living (formerly Betta Electrical) has twice won the Roy Morgan Customer Satisfaction Award for Furniture/Electrical Store of the Year, in 2015 and 2019. In 2015, Betta topped the monthly Furniture/Electrical Store rankings in 7 of 12 months, including a run of three consecutive months from March to May. In 2019, Betta recorded five monthly wins for the year and was reported as "unbeatable since mid-year," reaching customer satisfaction scores as high as 95%.

== Sponsorships ==
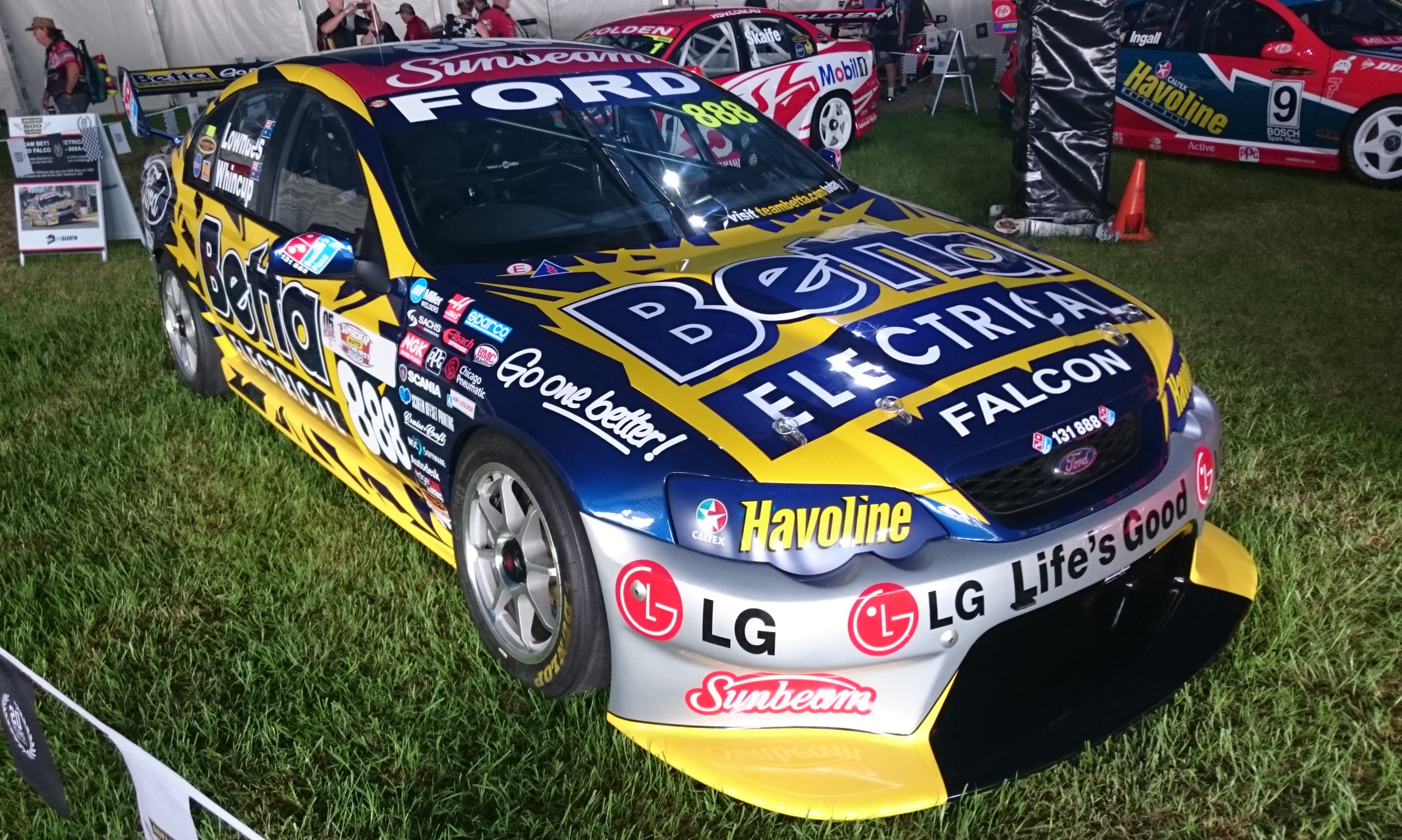
Triple Eight Race Engineering Ford Falcon BA

=== Supercars Championship ===
Betta was naming rights sponsor of several Supercars Championship teams; John Faulkner Racing from 1996 until 1998, Briggs Motor Sport / Triple Eight Race Engineering from 2002 until 2006 and Paul Weel Racing in 2003.

=== Brisbane Heat ===
Betta was a major partner of the Brisbane Heat cricket team from 2012 to 2024.

=== The Kids' Cancer Project ===
Betta has been a long-standing supporter of The Kids' Cancer Project, and made its official debut as the naming-rights partner for the foundation's annual fitness event, the Better Challenge, starting in 2026.
