= 2001 Australian Formula Ford Championship =

Motor racing competition

Seasons
- ← 2000 2002 →

The 2001 Australian Formula Ford Championship was an Australian motor racing competition for Formula Ford cars. It was sanctioned by the Confederation of Australian Motor Sport as an Australian title. Promoted as the Ford Racing Australian Formula Ford Championship, it was the 32nd national series for Formula Fords to be held in Australia and the ninth to carry the Australian Formula Ford Championship name.

The season was dominated by both Will Davison and Will Power, with both drivers winning 14 out of the 15 races completed. Nick Agland was the only other driver to win a race; taking victory at Sandown as both Davison and Power retired from proceedings. Their overwhelming success as compared to the rest of the field led to a year-long title fight that would be dubbed The Battle of the Will's. Davison secured pole position in all but one of the events, and in the penultimate round in Queensland, he secured the championship with a round to spare.

This season would see the emergence of future V8 Supercar champion, Jamie Whincup. Entering a privately run entry, his pace improved considerably throughout the year and his consistency helped secure him third outright in the drivers standings. Long-time rival Mark Winterbottom would also make his debut in racing cars midway through the season with Borland Racing Developments.

== Teams and drivers ==
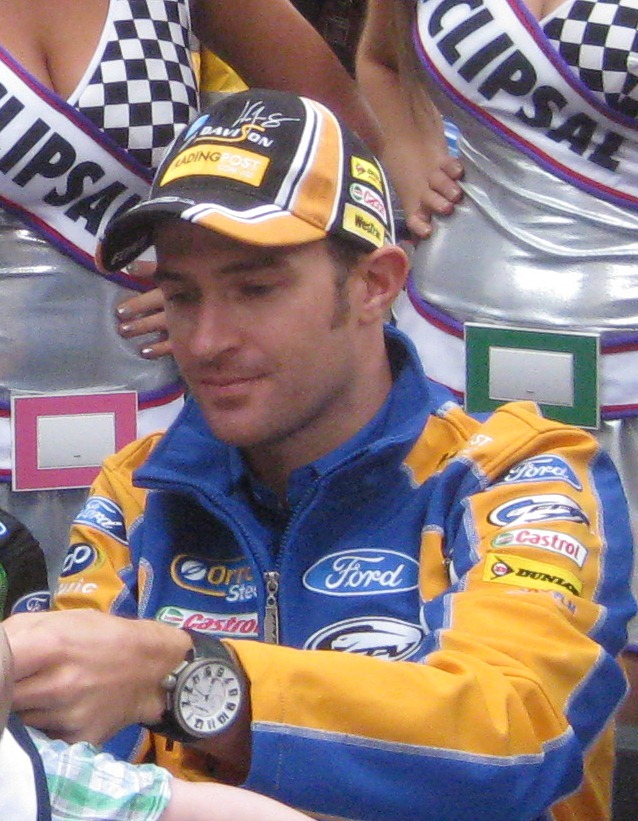
Championship winner Will Davison, pictured in 2012

Team	Chassis	No	Driver	Rounds
Borland Racing Developments	Spectrum 05	5	(Australia) Nick Agland	All
Borland Racing Developments	Spectrum 05	41	(Australia) Mark Winterbottom	6, 8
Borland Racing Developments	Spectrum 06	71	(Australia) Michael Caruso	1–7
Sonic Motor Racing Services	Van Diemen RF01	6	(Australia) Will Davison	All
Sonic Motor Racing Services	Van Diemen RF01	17	(Australia) Marcus Marshall	4–6, 8
Power Racing	Van Diemen RF95	7	(Australia) Will Power	All
Factory Enterprises	Spectrum 06b	9	(Australia) Justin Cotter	4–5, 7–8
JW Motorsport	Van Diemen RF94	10	(Australia) Stuart Kostera	All
Hanger Racing	Spectrum 06b	11	(Australia) Ty Hanger	1–3, 5–8
Barton Mower Motorsport	Van Diemen RF01	12	(Australia) Barton Mawer	1–3
Fastlane Racing	Van Diemen RF94	13	(Australia) Chris Dell	1–5, 8
Fastlane Racing	Van Diemen RF90	37	(Australia) Ryan Hitzman	3
Fastlane Racing	Van Diemen RF94	38	(Australia) Daniel Elliott	3, 5–6, 8
Fastlane Racing	Van Diemen RF94	50	(New Zealand) Robby Henderson	3, 5–6
Fastlane Racing	Van Diemen RF92	62	(New Zealand) Matt Fitzgerald	8
Fastlane Racing	Van Diemen RF91	63	(New Zealand) Darren Drake	8
Fastlane Racing	Van Diemen RF92	82	(Australia) David Cocciolone	3
Fastlane Racing	Van Diemen RF94	93	(Australia) Paul Fiore	3
Brad Jones Racing	Van Diemen RF94	15	(Australia) Andrew Jones	All
Simon Wheeler	Van Diemen RF98	16	(Australia) Simon Wheeler	3
No Limit Racing	Van Diemen RF01	17	(Australia) Marcus Marshall	1–3
Robert Jones	Van Diemen RF94	21	(Australia) Robert Jones	4, 6
Black Cat Racing Products	Spectrum 07	22	(Australia) Chris Templer	1–3
J&F Motors	Van Diemen RF97	24	(Australia) Steven Grocl	1, 8
Daniel Reinhardt	Spectrum 06	28	(Australia) Daniel Reinhardt	8
Bob's Panels	Mygale 98	29	(Australia) Adrian McCurdy	1, 4, 8
Whincup Racing	Mygale SJ2000	30	(Australia) Jamie Whincup	All
Anglo Australian Motorsport	Van Diemen RF93	31	(Australia) Jack Lynch	1–5
Anglo Australian Motorsport	Van Diemen RF94	35	(Australia) Andrew Tomlinson	5–6
Kurt Wimmer	Van Diemen RF95	32	(Australia) Kurt Wimmer	7
Perth Brake Parts	Van Diemen RF92	33	(Australia) Steve Baxter	1, 3
John Pettit	Swift FB90	33	(Australia) John Pettit	5
Lowe Racing	Swift SC93K	34	(Australia) Ash Lowe	1–2, 4–8
Mark Douglas	Van Diemen RF94	34	(Australia) Mark Douglas	3
Michael Henderson	Swift SC95K	35	(Australia) Michael Henderson	3
Chris Gilmour	Van Diemen RF96	36	(Australia) Chris Gilmour	7
Craig Kermond	Van Diemen RF93	39	(Australia) Craig Kermond	1
Sausage Software	Van Diemen RF94	40	(Australia) Hart Mason	1–6
In Tune Racing	Swift SC95	42	(Australia) John Houlder	2
Rupert Collins Plastics	Spectrum 06b	42	(Australia) Adam Hickey	8
James Small Racing	Mygale SJ01	43	(Australia) James Small	1, 3–6, 8
Matthew Cherry	Spectrum 06	44	(Australia) Matthew Cherry	3
ESANDA	Van Diemen RF93	44	(Australia) Geoff Calvert	8
Kai Heller	Van Diemen RF97	46	(Australia) Kai Heller	3
Tim Wheeler	Van Diemen RF98	48	(Australia) Tim Wheeler	3
Nick Torelli	Spectrum 06	49	(Australia) Nick Torelli	1, 5
JV Crash	Ray 95	52	(Australia) Jamie Carter	6
Nathan Lea Racing	Swift SC94K	53	(Australia) Nathan Lea	2, 5
Tony Quinn	Vector MG96	53	(Australia) Kent Quinn	7
Tony Quinn	Vector TF94	54	(Australia) Klark Quinn	7
William Hall Motorsport	Spectrum 06	55	(Australia) William Hall	3–4, 6
Fisher and Paykel Racing	Swift SC94F	56	(Australia) Justin Watt	2, 5
Neil McFadyen Racing	Van Diemen RF96	59	(Australia) Neil McFadyen	2, 5
Laminate Traders	Van Diemen RF96	60	(Australia) Sam Oliver	1, 4, 8
Jordan Orsmby	Van Diemen RF93	61	(Australia) Jordan Orsmby	8
G-Force Motorsport	Van Diemen RF96	63	(Australia) Nick Cartledge	4
MGM Zifa Motorsports	Spectrum 06	65	(Malaysia) Zarith Alfian	1–3
Sean Supanz	Van Diemen RF87	67	(Australia) Sean Supanz	3
Luke Morton	Van Diemen RF94	69	(Australia) Luke Morton	3
Nomad Racing	Spectrum	74	(Australia) Mark McNally	3
Laurence Burford	Van Diemen RF92	75	(Australia) Laurence Burford	2
Brian Sampson	Spectrum 06b	75	(Australia) Kenny Habul	8
Clem Smith	Van Diemen	78	(Australia) Graham Knuckey	6
Richard Chamberlain	Spectrum	79	(Australia) Richard Chamberlain	6, 8
Michael Boyland	Van Diemen	80	(Australia) Michael Boyland	6
Mineruanet Motorsport	Spectrum 06	83	(Australia) Veijo Phillips	1–2, 4, 6–8
Tony LeMessurier	Van Diemen RF95	87	(Australia) Tony LeMessurier	5, 7
Optima Motorsport	Van Diemen RF98	88	(Australia) David Clark	1–2, 4–7
John McCowan	Van Diemen RF90	92	(Australia) John McCowan	3
Greg Fahey	Van Diemen RF95	95	(Australia) Kevin Miller	7

== Calendar ==
The championship was contested over an eight-round series with two races per round.

Round	Circuit	Dates	Supporting	Map
1	(Victoria (state)) Phillip Island Grand Prix Circuit	25 March	Shell Championship Series	2001 Australian Formula Ford Championship is located in Australia
2	(New South Wales) Eastern Creek Raceway	29 April	Shell Championship Series	2001 Australian Formula Ford Championship is located in Australia
3	(Western Australia) Wanneroo Raceway	23–24 June	Shell Championship Series	2001 Australian Formula Ford Championship is located in Australia
3	(Victoria (state)) Calder Park Raceway	15 July	Shell Championship Series	2001 Australian Formula Ford Championship is located in Australia
5	(New South Wales) Oran Park Raceway	29 July	Shell Championship Series	2001 Australian Formula Ford Championship is located in Australia
6	(South Australia) Mallala Motor Sport Park	12 August	Konica V8 Supercar Series	2001 Australian Formula Ford Championship is located in Australia
7	Queensland Raceway	25–26 August	Shell Championship Series; Queensland 500	2001 Australian Formula Ford Championship is located in Australia
8	(Victoria (state)) Sandown Raceway	2 December	Shell Championship Series	2001 Australian Formula Ford Championship is located in Australia

== Season summary ==
Rd	Race	Circuit	Pole position	Fastest lap	Winning driver	Winning team	Round Winner
1	1	(Victoria (state)) Phillip Island Grand Prix Circuit	(Australia) Will Power	(Australia) Will Power	(Australia) Will Davison	Sonic Motor Racing Services	(Australia) Will Power
1	2	(Victoria (state)) Phillip Island Grand Prix Circuit		(Australia) Will Power	(Australia) Will Power	Power Racing	(Australia) Will Power
2	1	(New South Wales) Eastern Creek Raceway	(Australia) Will Davison	(Australia) Will Power	(Australia) Will Power	Power Racing	(Australia) Will Power
2	2	(New South Wales) Eastern Creek Raceway		(Australia) Will Power	(Australia) Will Power	Power Racing	(Australia) Will Power
3	1	(Western Australia) Wanneroo Raceway	(Australia) Will Davison	(Australia) Will Davison	(Australia) Will Davison	Sonic Motor Racing Services	(Australia) Will Davison
3	2	(Western Australia) Wanneroo Raceway		(Australia) Will Power	(Australia) Will Davison	Sonic Motor Racing Services	(Australia) Will Davison
4	1	(Victoria (state)) Calder Park Raceway	(Australia) Will Davison	(Australia) Will Davison	(Australia) Will Davison	Sonic Motor Racing Services	(Australia) Will Davison
4	2	(Victoria (state)) Calder Park Raceway		(Australia) Will Power	(Australia) Will Power	Power Racing	(Australia) Will Davison
5	1	(New South Wales) Oran Park Raceway	(Australia) Will Davison	(Australia) Will Davison	(Australia) Will Davison	Sonic Motor Racing Services	(Australia) Will Davison
5	2	(New South Wales) Oran Park Raceway		(Australia) Will Davison	(Australia) Will Davison	Sonic Motor Racing Services	(Australia) Will Davison
6	1	(South Australia) Mallala Motor Sport Park	(Australia) Will Davison	(Australia) Will Davison	(Australia) Will Davison	Sonic Motor Racing Services	(Australia) Will Davison
6	2	(South Australia) Mallala Motor Sport Park		(Australia) Will Power	(Australia) Will Power	Power Racing	(Australia) Will Davison
7	1	Queensland Raceway	(Australia) Will Davison	(Australia) Marcus Marshall	(Australia) Will Davison	Sonic Motor Racing Services	(Australia) Will Davison
7	2	Queensland Raceway		(Australia) Will Davison	(Australia) Will Davison	Sonic Motor Racing Services	(Australia) Will Davison
8	1	(Victoria (state)) Sandown Raceway	(Australia) Will Davison	(Australia) Nick Agland	(Australia) Nick Agland	Borland Racing Developments	(Australia) Nick Agland
8	2	(Victoria (state)) Sandown Raceway	Race cancelled due to inclement weather				(Australia) Nick Agland

== Championship standings ==
Championship points were awarded at each race on the following basis:

Position	1st	2nd	3rd	4th	5th	6th	7th	8th	9th	10th	Pole
Points	20	16	14	12	10	8	6	4	2	1	1

Pos.	Driver	(New South Wales) PHI		(New South Wales) EAS		(Western Australia) WAN		(Victoria (state)) CAL		(New South Wales) ORA		(South Australia) MAL		(Queensland) QUE		(Victoria (state)) SAN		Pts
Pos.	Driver	R1	R2	R1	R2	R1	R2	R1	R2	R1	R2	R1	R2	R1	R2	R1	R2	Pts
1	(Australia) Will Davison	1	2	2	2	1	1	1	2	1	1	1	2	1	1	Ret	C	266
2	(Australia) Will Power	2	1	1	1	2	3	2	1	Ret	7	2	1	4	4	Ret	C	210
3	(Australia) Jamie Whincup	3	3	3	3	8	Ret	3	7	Ret	8	6	3	5	3	2	C	146
4	(Australia) Stuart Kostera	10	11	7	7	3	2	4	3	2	3	8	10	11	7	Ret	C	121
5	(Australia) Nick Agland	19	12	4	4	6	14	Ret	Ret	4	5	4	6	3	12	1	C	108
6	(Australia) Andrew Jones	4	4	6	6	5	5	Ret	Ret	7	6	21	5	8	6	6	C	104
7	(Australia) Marcus Marshall	17	9	9	10	14	16	5	5	3	2	Ret	Ret	2	2	3	C	101
8	(Australia) Chris Dell	5	5	Ret	11	21	Ret	Ret	DNS	5	4					7	C	48
9	(Australia) David Clark	6	6	12	9	13	25	6	4	DSQ	15	10	19	7	9			47
10	(Australia) Ty Hanger	7	10	8	8	9	8	9	12	8	10	7	7	9	Ret	Ret	C	42
11	(Australia) Daniel Elliott	DNS	DNS			4	4			15	11	5	15			8	C	38
12	(New Zealand) Robbie Henderson					7	6			6	Ret	3	12					36
=	(Australia) Justin Cotter							Ret	8	19	9			6	5	4	C	36
14	(Australia) Barton Mawer	12	8	5	5	15	9	DNS	DNS	11	Ret							26
15	(Australia) James Small	8	7	13	13	12	Ret	10	6	Ret	16	15	Ret			Ret	C	19
16	(Australia) Ash Lowe	18	13	10	Ret			7	9	10	13	9	11	10	8	11	C	17
17	(Australia) Mark Winterbottom											Ret	13			5	C	10
18	(Australia) Veijo Phillips	14	Ret	15	14			8	Ret			11	8	13	13	Ret	C	8
19	(Australia) Steve Baxter	15	14			10	7											7
20	(Australia) Jack Lynch	9	Ret	11	16	20	19	14	10	9	12							5
21	(Australia) Richard Chamberlain											13	9			Ret	C	2
=	(Australia) Daniel Reinhardt															9	C	2
23	(Australia) David Cocciolone					18	10											1
=	(Australia) Michael Caruso	22	15	14	12	Ret	Ret	Ret	13	13	14	12	10	14	11			1
=	(Australia) Hart Mason	13	20	16	17	19	15	13	14	12	Ret	14	14	12	10			1
=	(New Zealand) Darren Drake															10	C	1
-	(Australia) Chris Templer	11	17	17	15	17	20											0
-	(Australia) Steven Grocl	16	16													14	C	0
-	(Australia) Sam Oliver	20	18					DNS	DNS							12	C	0
-	(Australia) Craig Kermond	21	19															0
-	(Australia) Adrian McCurdy	23	Ret					15	Ret							15	C	0
-	(Australia) Nick Torelli	24	21							Ret	20							0
-	(Malaysia) Zarith Alfian	Ret	Ret	Ret	22	22	21											0
-	(Australia) Stuart Dedear	DNS	DNS															0
-	(Australia) Justin Watt			18	19					14	17							0
-	(Australia) Neil McFadyen			19	Ret					21	18							0
-	(Australia) Laurence Burford			20	18													0
-	(Australia) Nathan Lea			21	20					18	21							0
-	(Australia) John Houlder			22	21													0
-	(Australia) Matthew Cherry					11	12											0
-	(Australia) William Hall					16	13	12	16			19	17					0
-	(Australia) Ryan Hitzman					23	23											0
-	(Australia) Mark Douglas					24	18											0
-	(Australia) Paul Fiore					25	Ret											0
-	(Australia) Tim Wheeler					26	22											0
-	(Australia) Simon Wheeler					Ret	11											0
-	(Australia) Kai Heller					Ret	17											0
-	(Australia) Mark McNally					Ret	24											0
-	(Australia) John McCowan					Ret	Ret											0
-	(Australia) Luke Morton					Ret	Ret											0
-	(Australia) Robert Jones							11	11			18	16					0
-	(Australia) Nick Cartledge							16	15									0
-	(Australia) Steve Beards							DNS	DNS									0
-	(Australia) John Pettit									16	19							0
-	(Australia) Andrew Tomlinson									17	22	16	18					0
-	(Australia) Tony LeMessurier									Ret	DNS			17	17			0
-	(Australia) David Burch									20	23							0
-	(Australia) Jamie Carter											17	Ret					0
-	(Australia) Michael Boyland											20	DNS					0
-	(Australia) Chris Gilmour													15	15			0
-	(Australia) Kurt Wimmer													16	16			0
-	(Australia) Klark Quinn													18	14			0
-	(Australia) Kent Quinn													Ret	18			0
-	(Australia) Kevin Miller													19	19			0
-	(Australia) Kenny Habul															13	C	0
-	(Australia) Jordan Ormsby															16	C	0
-	(Australia) Adam Hickey															17	C	0
-	(New Zealand) Matt Fitzgerald															18	C	0
-	(Australia) Geoff Calvert															19	C	0
Pos.	Driver	(New South Wales) PHI		(New South Wales) EAS		(Western Australia) WAN		(Victoria (state)) CAL		(New South Wales) ORA		(South Australia) MAL		(Queensland) QUE		(Victoria (state)) SAN		Pts
Pos.	Driver	R1	R2	R1	R2	R1	R2	R1	R2	R1	R2	R1	R2	R1	R2	R1	R2	Pts

=== Notes ===
- Australian Formula Ford regulations specified the use of the Ford Kent 1600 engine.
- Race two of the final round was abandoned due to bad weather.
