= 2006 Fujitsu V8 Supercar Series =

Motor racing competition

The 2006 Fujitsu V8 Supercar Series was an Australian motor racing series for V8 Supercars. It was the seventh annual V8 Supercar Development Series. It began on 24 March 2006 at Adelaide Street Circuit and finished on 10 December at Phillip Island Grand Prix Circuit after seven rounds held across four different states.

The series was dominated by a single driver, with Howard Racing Ford Falcon driver Adam Macrow winning eight of the 18 races and five of the seven rounds. Dick Johnson Racing Ford Falcon driver Andrew Thompson won the remaining two rounds, including three race wins. An inconsistent start to the series saw him only eighth in the pointscore which placed a heavy emphasis on finishing over winning. Young Perkins Motorsport Holden Commodore drivers Shane Price and Jack Perkins finished second and third in the series, with Price taking two race wins. The only other multiple race winner was Kayne Scott who won two reverse grid races.

The series was marred by a fatal accident at the Mount Panorama round where David Clark crashed into the stationary car of Mark Porter. Clark was seriously injured in the collision while Porter died in the Royal Prince Alfred Hospital two days after the accident.

== Race calendar ==
Round	Date	Circuit	Location	Winning driver	Car
1	24–25 March	(South Australia) Adelaide Street Circuit	Adelaide, South Australia	Adam Macrow	Ford Falcon (BA)
2	27–28 May	(New South Wales) Wakefield Park	Goulburn, New South Wales	Adam Macrow	Ford Falcon (BA)
3	21–23 July	Queensland Raceway	Ipswich, Queensland	Adam Macrow	Ford Falcon (BA)
4	11–13 August	(New South Wales) Oran Park Raceway	Sydney, New South Wales	Adam Macrow	Ford Falcon (BA)
5	16–17 September	(South Australia) Mallala Motor Sport Park	Mallala, South Australia	Adam Macrow	Ford Falcon (BA)
6	5–7 October	(New South Wales) Mount Panorama Circuit	Bathurst, New South Wales	Andrew Thompson	Ford Falcon (BA)
7	8–10 December	(Victoria (state)) Phillip Island Grand Prix Circuit	Phillip Island, Victoria	Andrew Thompson	Ford Falcon (BA)

== Teams and drivers ==
A record number of competitors took part in the 2006 series with the Queensland Raceway round over-subscribed with 41 cars entering, forcing the slowest qualifiers to sit out the racing.
The following teams and drivers have competed during the 2006 Fujitsu V8 Supercar Series:

Team	Vehicle	No	Driver	Rounds
Sieders Racing Team	Ford Falcon (AU)	13	(Australia) Colin Sieders	2–4, 6-7
Stones Motorsport	Holden Commodore (VX)	24	(Australia) Nigel Stones	1-4
Howard Racing	Ford Falcon (BA)	27	(Australia) Adam Macrow	All
Howard Racing	Ford Falcon (BA)	37	(Australia) Mark Howard	All
Project Mu	Holden Commodore (VY)	28	(Australia) Alan Gurr	3
Project Mu	Holden Commodore (VY)	57	(Australia) Ryan McLeod	6
Project Mu	Holden Commodore (VX)	57	(Australia) Bruce Williams	7
Matthew White Racing	Ford Falcon (BA)	28	(Australia) Matthew White	1–2, 4-7
Matthew White Racing	Ford Falcon (BA)	29	(Australia) Dean Wanless	1-3
Matthew White Racing	Ford Falcon (BA)	29	(Australia) Wayne Wakefield	6-7
A.N.T. Racing	Ford Falcon (BA)	30	(Australia) Tony Evangelou	1-6
McGill Motorsport	Holden Commodore (VX)	32	(Australia) Aaron McGill	1
McGill Motorsport	Ford Falcon (AU)	32	(Australia) Aaron McGill	2-7
Gravity Motorsport	Holden Commodore (VX)	35	(Australia) Mark Papendall	1–3, 5-7
Optima Sport	Ford Falcon (BA)	36	(Australia) David Clark	1-6
Eggleston Motorsport	Holden Commodore (VX)	38	(Australia) Ben Eggleston	1–4, 6
Peters Motorsport	Ford Falcon (AU)	40	(Australia) Wayne Wakefield	1-3
Peters Motorsport	Ford Falcon (AU)	40	(Australia) Luke Youlden	4-6
Peters Motorsport	Ford Falcon (AU)	40	(United Kingdom) Ben Clucas	7
Peters Motorsport	Ford Falcon (AU)	80	(Australia) Barry Tanton	1–4, 6-7
Peters Motorsport	Ford Falcon (BA)	91	(Australia) Gary Deane	All
Partington Race Prep	Ford Falcon (AU)	41	(New Zealand) Chris Pither	All
Jay Motorsport	Holden Commodore (VY)	42	(Australia) Jay Verdnik	All
Jack Hillerman Racing	Holden Commodore (VZ)	43	(Australia) Chris Alajajian	3-7
Adam Sharpe Motorsport	Ford Falcon (AU)	44	(United Kingdom) Adam Sharpe	1–4, 6-7
O’Brien Motorsport	Ford Falcon (BA)	45	(Australia) Shannon O'Brien	All
Image Racing	Ford Falcon (AU)	48	(Australia) Dean Neville	2–3, 6-7
Image Racing	Ford Falcon (AU)	49	(Australia) Terry Wyhoon	2, 6-7
Image Racing	Ford Falcon (AU)	49	(New Zealand) Paul Kelly	3
John Henderson Motorsport	Ford Falcon (AU)	56	(Australia) John Henderson	2–4, 6
JPS Automotive	Holden Commodore (VX)	57	(Australia) Dean Savage	1
Speed FX Racing	Ford Falcon (BA)	60	(Australia) Michael Caruso	All
Dick Johnson Racing	Ford Falcon (AU)	61	(Australia) Marcus La Delle	1, 3-7
Dick Johnson Racing	Ford Falcon (BA)	71	(Australia) Andrew Thompson	All
Dick Johnson Racing	Ford Falcon (BA)	81	(Australia) Grant Denyer	1, 3-7
Dick Johnson Racing	Ford Falcon (BA)	81	(Australia) Luke Youlden	2
Scott Loadsman Racing	Holden Commodore (VY)	62	(Australia) Scott Loadsman	2-7
Shane Beikoff Racing	Ford Falcon (AU)	68	(Australia) Shane Beikoff	1, 5, 7
Shane Beikoff Racing	Ford Falcon (AU)	68	(Australia) Jonathan Beikoff	2–4, 6
CarTrek Racing	Holden Commodore (VX)	69	(Australia) Robert Jones	5-7
Robert Smith Racing	Holden Commodore (VY)	70	(Australia) Geoff Emery	All
Robert Smith Racing	Holden Commodore (VY)	72	(Australia) Nathan Pretty	All
Tony D'Alberto Racing	Holden Commodore (VY)	74	(Australia) Mark McNally	3-7
Tony D'Alberto Racing	Holden Commodore (VZ)	99	(Australia) Tony D'Alberto	All
Perkins Motorsport	Holden Commodore (VZ)	77	(Australia) Shane Price	All
Perkins Motorsport	Holden Commodore (VZ)	78	(Australia) Jack Perkins	All
Greg Smith Racing	Ford Falcon (AU)	86	(Australia) Greg Smith	1–4, 6
Summertime Pools	Ford Falcon (AU)	87	(Australia) Benjamin Falk	2, 4-5
Summertime Pools	Ford Falcon (AU)	87	(Australia) John Falk	3, 6
Clayton Pyne Racing	Holden Commodore (VX)	90	(Australia) Clayton Pyne	4, 6-7
Sydney Star Racing	Holden Commodore (VY)	95	(Australia) Mathew Hunt	3-7
Sydney Star Racing	Holden Commodore (VY)	98	(Australia) Tim Monte	1–2, 4
Sydney Star Racing	Holden Commodore (VY)	98	(Australia) Stephen Voight	3
Sydney Star Racing	Holden Commodore (VY)	98	(Australia) Derek Hocking	5
Sydney Star Racing	Ford Falcon (AU)	98	(Australia) Tim Monte	6
Sydney Star Racing	Ford Falcon (AU)	333	(Australia) Mathew Hunt	2
United Oil Racing	Ford Falcon (BA)	96	(Australia) Brett Hobson	3–4, 6-7
Wollongong Performance Racing; Mark Petch Motorsport	Holden Commodore (VZ)	100	(New Zealand) Kayne Scott	1-5
Wollongong Performance Racing; Mark Petch Motorsport	Holden Commodore (VZ)	100	(Australia) Damien White	7
MSport	Holden Commodore (VZ)	111	(New Zealand) Mark Porter	1-6

== Points system ==
The series consisted of seven rounds across four different states. Rounds 2, 3, 4 and 5 consisted of three races each. The second race of each weekend saw the finishing order of race 1 reversed to form the grid for a 'reverse grid' race. Point allocated for the reverse grid race were worth half as much as were the first and third races of these rounds. Rounds 1, 6 and 7 each consisted of two races.

Points were awarded for cars who finished in the top 32 race positions in each race according to finishing order. With cars finishing races as low as 37th, there were numerous occasions during the season were cars did not receive points for finishing races.

Position	1st	2nd	3rd	4th	5th	6th	7th	8th	9th	10th	11th	12th	13th	14th	15th	16th	17th	18th	19th	20th	21st	22nd	23rd	24th	25th	26th	27th	28th	29th	30th	31st	32nd
Rounds 2, 3, 4 & 5 Standard Race Points	128	124	120	116	112	108	104	100	96	92	88	84	80	76	72	68	64	60	56	52	48	44	40	36	32	28	24	20	16	12	8	4
Rounds 2, 3, 4 & 5 Reverse Grid Race Points	64	62	60	58	56	54	52	50	48	46	44	42	40	38	36	34	32	30	28	26	24	22	20	18	16	14	12	10	8	6	4	2
Rounds 1, 6 & 7 Race Points	160	155	150	145	140	135	130	125	120	115	110	105	100	95	90	85	80	75	70	65	60	55	50	45	40	35	30	25	20	15	10	5

== Series standings ==
Points table referenced, in part, as follows:

Pos	Driver	Car	ADE		WAK			QLD			ORA			MAL			BAT		PHI		Pts
1	(Australia) Adam Macrow	Ford Falcon (BA)	1	1	1	9	1	2	11	1	1	15	3	1	11	1	5	4	9	10	2024
2	(Australia) Shane Price	Holden Commodore (VZ)	10	6	3	13	5	5	14	2	8	10	1	2	10	2	3	2	1	2	1984
3	(Australia) Jack Perkins	Holden Commodore (VZ)	27	10	4	22	8	6	8	5	6	17	4	3	9	Ret	10	3	6	9	1597
4	(Australia) Michael Caruso	Ford Falcon (BA)	2	2	19	25	Ret	3	29	7	2	18	13	11	23	4	8	10	7	8	1567
5	(Australia) Nathan Pretty	Holden Commodore (VY)	6	4	8	7	3	Ret	13	10	3	27	2	6	13	5	Ret	DNS	8	7	1455
6	(Australia) Tony D'Alberto	Holden Commodore (VZ)	5	25	33	29	9	13	5	8	4	12	33	7	17	22	2	5	3	5	1443
7	(New Zealand) Mark Porter	Holden Commodore (VZ)	9	3	14	2	2	1	Ret	3	9	19	8	5	7	3	6	DNS			1423
8	(Australia) Andrew Thompson	Ford Falcon (BA)	12	Ret	10	Ret	DNS	7	22	9	33	2	26	16	5	6	1	1	2	1	1376
9	(Australia) Grant Denyer	Ford Falcon (BA)	3	12				4	18	4	7	14	Ret	8	14	19	12	8	14	6	1313
10	(Australia) Matthew White	Ford Falcon (BA)	26	24	9	17	12				5	16	5	15	24	15	7	6	4	3	1272
11	(New Zealand) Chris Pither	Ford Falcon (AU)	13	9	7	Ret	DNS	11	4	26	21	Ret	DNS	21	3	10	14	12	16	13	1131
12	(Australia) Wayne Wakefield	Ford Falcon (AU)	4	5	5	14	7	12	35	11							4	7	10	Ret	1101
13	(New Zealand) Kayne Scott	Holden Commodore (VZ)	8	8	6	19	Ret	18	1	12	12	13	10	19	1	8					1030
14	(Australia) Tony Evangelou	Ford Falcon (BA)	7	7	17	3	Ret	15	7	28	28	3	14	12	15	14	32	9			1005
15	(Australia) Aaron McGill	Holden Commodore (VX)	15	16	23	4	10	21	26	15	18	9	12	DNS	DNS	DNS	25	23	30	20	861
16	(Australia) Mark Howard	Ford Falcon (BA)	14	15	22	16	13	36	33	20	26	Ret	29	13	18	12	22	DSQ	17	16	853
17	(Australia) Jay Verdnik	Holden Commodore (VY)	22	11	Ret	DNS	DNS	38	30	14	29	26	Ret	20	4	7	17	13	15	15	851
18	(Australia) Marcus La Delle	Ford Falcon (AU)	Ret	DNS				8	12	Ret	19	5	9	10	8	17	33	14	12	23	806
19	(Australia) David Clark	Ford Falcon (BA)	21	19	11	8	6	30	Ret	27	34	1	21	9	6	Ret	11	DNS			784
20	(Australia) Brett Hobson	Ford Falcon (BA)						16	15	13	23	6	6				16	11	18	12	761
21	(Australia) Matthew Hunt	Ford Falcon (AU)			18	Ret	DNS	20	16	17	32	7	11	17	21	13	15	Ret	20	25	717
22	(Australia) Luke Youlden	Ford Falcon (BA)			2	5	4				10	Ret	17	27	2	Ret	9	24			703
23	(Australia) Mark McNally	Holden Commodore (VY)						22	3	22	20	8	32	14	12	9	Ret	DNS	13	11	678
24	(Australia) Geoff Emery	Holden Commodore (VY)	Ret	14	12	21	21	19	Ret	18	Ret	23	23	18	26	Ret	27	Ret	11	27	671
25	(Australia) Chris Alajajian	Holden Commodore (VZ)						28	2	Ret	11	24	7	4	19	11	30	Ret	Ret	14	634
26	(Australia) Shannon O'Brien	Ford Falcon (BA)	20	Ret	24	12	27	9	9	21	DNS	31	16	DNS	DNS	DNS	13	Ret	27	19	631
27	(United Kingdom) Adam Sharpe	Ford Falcon (AU)	19	Ret	13	32	26	17	10	Ret	17	11	22				20	16	26	Ret	627
28	(Australia) Dean Wanless	Ford Falcon (AU)	11	13	15	15	11	14	20	16											576
29	(Australia) Scott Loadsman	Holden Commodore (VY)			29	11	Ret	26	34	30	22	22	Ret	22	22	18	26	20	25	22	487
30	(Australia) Colin Sieders	Ford Falcon (AU)			21	20	18	23	19	29	14	20	28				19	Ret	28	26	470
31	(Australia) Gary Deane	Ford Falcon (BA)	16	26	Ret	31	22	Ret	28	19	25	28	27	23	Ret	DNS	29	21	32	29	445
32	(Australia) Greg Smith	Ford Falcon (AU)	25	21	26	28	24	35	17	24	27	4	18				Ret	22			439
33	(Australia) Dean Neville	Ford Falcon (AU)			30	6	15	31	23	25							28	19	22	18	423
34	(Australia) Ben Eggleston	Holden Commodore (VX)	Ret	DNS	20	18	14	32	24	Ret	16	21	19				21	Ret			388
35	(Australia) Shane Beikoff	Ford Falcon (AU)	17	17										24	20	20			24	24	364
36	(Australia) Jonathan Beikoff	Ford Falcon (AU)			16	23	16	25	25	23	15	Ret	24				DNS	DNS			352
37	(Australia) Clayton Pyne	Holden Commodore (VX)									13	Ret	15				Ret	18	23	21	337
38	(Australia) John Henderson	Ford Falcon (AU)			Ret	24	19	DNQ	DNQ	DNQ	24	Ret	20				18	17			317
39	(Australia) Terry Wyhoon	Ford Falcon (AU)			31	1	25										24	15	19	Ret	314
40	(Australia) Damien White	Holden Commodore (VZ)																	5	4	285
41	(Australia) Nigel Stones	Holden Commodore (VX)	18	20	27	30	20	37	32	32	31	25	25								280
42	(Australia) Robert Jones	Holden Commodore (VX)												26	16	16	Ret	Ret	21	17	270
43	(Australia) Alan Gurr	Holden Commodore (VY)						10	6	6											254
44	(Australia) Tim Monte	Holden Commodore (VX)	Ret	18	25	10	17				Ret	Ret	Ret				31	DSQ			227
45	(Australia) Mark Papendall	Holden Commodore (VX)	Ret	DNS	28	Ret	DNS	24	21	Ret				25	Ret	21	23	Ret	29	Ret	225
46	(Australia) Barry Tanton	Ford Falcon (AU)	24	22	DNQ	27	Ret	34	Ret	Ret	30	29	31				Ret	Ret	31	31	165
47	(Australia) Dean Savage	Holden Commodore (VX)	23	23																	100
48	(Australia) Derek Hocking	Holden Commodore (VY)												28	25	23					76
49	(Australia) Benjamin Falk	Ford Falcon (AU)			32	26	23				Ret	30	30	DNS	DNS	DNS					76
50	(Australia) John Falk	Ford Falcon (AU)						29	27	31							Ret	DNS			36
51	(Australia) Bruce Williams	Holden Commodore (VY)																	Ret	28	25
52	(Australia) Stephen Voight	Holden Commodore (VY)						27	36	Ret											24
53	(Australia) Paul Kelly	Ford Falcon (AU)						33	31	Ret											4
	(Australia) Ryan McLeod	Holden Commodore (VY)															DNS	DNS			
	(United Kingdom) Ben Clucas	Ford Falcon (AU)																	DNS	DNS	

Colour	Result
Gold	Winner
Silver	Second place
Bronze	Third place
Green	Points classification
Blue	Non-points classification
Blue	Non-classified finish (NC)
Purple	Retired, not classified (Ret)
Red	Did not qualify (DNQ)
Red	Did not pre-qualify (DNPQ)
Black	Disqualified (DSQ)
White	Did not start (DNS)
White	Withdrew (WD)
White	Race cancelled (C)
Blank	Did not practice (DNP)
Blank	Did not arrive (DNA)
Blank	Excluded (EX)

== See also ==
- 2006 V8 Supercar season
