= 2002 Konica V8 Supercar Series =

Motor racing competition

The 2002 Konica V8 Supercar Series was an Australian touring car series held for V8 Supercars. It was the third series held for second tier V8 Supercar teams. The series began on 31 March 2002 at Wakefield Park and finished on 4 August at Mallala Motor Sport Park having been contested over five rounds held across three different states.

The series was dominated by Paul Dumbrell who won twelve races during the course of the 15 race series. Dumbrell finished 484 points clear of the only other driver to win more than one race, Dale Brede.

== Teams and drivers ==
The following teams and drivers competed in the 2002 Konica V8 Supercar Series.

Team	Car	No.	Driver	Rounds
Imrie Motor Sport	Holden Commodore (VT)	13	(Australia) Steve Owen	2–5
Brad Jones Racing	Ford Falcon (AU)	20	(Australia) Andrew Jones	4
Terry Wyhoon Racing	Ford Falcon (EL)	25	(Australia) Terry Wyhoon	All
M3 Motorsport	Holden Commodore (VT)	26	(Australia) Bob McDonald	All
Steven Ellery Racing	Ford Falcon (AU)	30	(Australia) Bob Thorn	1
Steven Ellery Racing	Ford Falcon (AU)	30	(Australia) Luke Youlden	2, 5
South Pacific Motor Sport	Holden Commodore (VS)	38	(Australia) Mathew Hunt	1–3
Craig Bastian	Ford Falcon (EL)	47	(Australia) Craig Bastian	1–3
Michael Simpson Racing	Ford Falcon (AU)	56	(Australia) Kevin Mundy	All
Michael Simpson Racing	Ford Falcon (EL)	93	(Australia) Michael Simpson	All
Michael Simpson Racing	Ford Falcon (EL)	94	(Australia) Mark Howard	All
Motorsport Engineering Services	Holden Commodore (VT)	58	(Australia) Derek van Zelm	1–2
Halliday Motor Sport	Ford Falcon (AU)	61	(Australia) Ross Halliday	All
Halliday Motor Sport	Ford Falcon (AU)	161	(Australia) Greg Crick	All
Independent Race Cars Australia	Holden Commodore (VX)	64	(Australia) Paul Dumbrell	All
Shane Beikoff Racing	Holden Commodore (VS)	68	(Australia) Shane Beikoff	1, 3, 5
Shane Beikoff Racing	Holden Commodore (VS)	68	(Australia) Phill Foster	2, 4
CarTrek Racing	Holden Commodore (VS); Holden Commodore (VX)	69	(Australia) Robert Jones	1–2, 4–5
CarTrek Racing	Holden Commodore (VS)	79	(Australia) Paul Freestone	4
Graphic Skills Racing	Holden Commodore (VS)	70	(Australia) David Skillender	5
Robert Smith Racing	Holden Commodore (VT)	72	(Australia) Robert Smith	All
TanderSport	Holden Commodore (VS)	74	(Australia) Leanne Ferrier	1, 3–5
Matthew White Racing	Holden Commodore (VT)	76	(Australia) Matthew White	All
Matthew White Racing	Holden Commodore (VS)	90	(Australia) Michael Turner	All
V8 Racing	Holden Commodore (VS)	77	(Australia) Richard Mork	1, 3–4
MSport	Ford Falcon (AU)	78	(New Zealand) Mark Porter	All
The Race Centre	Ford Falcon (AU)	87	(Australia) Rod Salmon	1–2
Harris Racing	Ford Falcon (AU)	88	(Australia) Craig Harris	All
Harris Racing	Ford Falcon (AU)	89	(Australia) Dale Brede	All
Phoenix Motorsport	Holden Commodore (VS)	95	(Australia) Ron Searle	All
Sydney Star Racing	Holden Commodore (VS)	98	(Australia) Grant Elliott	All
AJG Racing	Holden Commodore (VS)	99	(Australia) Wesley May	1–3
MoPro	Ford Falcon (EL)	110	(Australia) Grant Johnson	All
Clyde Lawrence Racing	Holden Commodore (VS)	140	(Australia) Clyde Lawrence	1–2, 4–5
A.N.T. Racing	Holden Commodore (VS)	300	(Australia) Tony Evangelou	2, 4

== Race calendar ==
Round	Date	Circuit	Location	Winning driver
1	30–31 March	(New South Wales) Wakefield Park	Goulburn, New South Wales	(Australia) Dale Brede
2	4–5 May	(Victoria (state)) Phillip Island Grand Prix Circuit	Phillip Island, Victoria	(Australia) Paul Dumbrell
3	15–16 June	(New South Wales) Oran Park Raceway	Sydney, New South Wales	(Australia) Paul Dumbrell
4	6–7 July	(Victoria (state)) Winton Motor Raceway	Benalla, Victoria	(Australia) Paul Dumbrell
5	3–4 August	(South Australia) Mallala Motor Sport Park	Mallala, South Australia	(Australia) Paul Dumbrell

== Points system ==
The season consisted of five rounds across three different states. Each round consisted of three races. Points were awarded for the first 32 positions at each race but at no race during the series did more than 22 cars finish. The third race of a race weekend carried approximately 50% more points than each of the first two races.

Position	1st	2nd	3rd	4th	5th	6th	7th	8th	9th	10th	11th	12th	13th	14th	15th	16th	17th	18th	19th	20th	21st	22nd
Race 1/2 Points	80	64	51	42	35	32	29	26	24	23	22	21	20	19	18	17	16	15	14	13	12	11
Race 3 Points	120	96	77	62	53	48	43	38	36	35	33	32	30	29	27	26	24	23	21	20	18	17

== Series standings ==
Points table referenced, in part, as follows:

Pos.	Driver	No.	WAK (New South Wales)			PHI (Victoria (state))			ORA (New South Wales)			WIN (Victoria (state))			MAL (South Australia)			Points
1	(Australia) Paul Dumbrell	64	1	4	2	1	1	1	1	1	1	1	1	1	1	2	1	1322
2	(Australia) Dale Brede	89	2	2	1	2	5	2	2	5	4	Ret	3	Ret	8	1	3	838
3	(Australia) Greg Crick	161	4	3	3	3	3	4	13	3	2	10	20	3	5	3	5	753
4	(Australia) Steve Owen	13				10	6	6	Ret	4	7	14	2	2	2	6	2	579
5	(New Zealand) Mark Porter	78	6	6	13	5	2	5	5	2	5	Ret	22	6	3	Ret	6	556
6	(Australia) Craig Harris	88	7	1	6	4	7	Ret	4	14	8	3	5	5	9	7	DNS	519
7	(Australia) Matthew White	76	3	11	4	Ret	Ret	16	6	6	3	2	4	14	7	Ret	8	504
8	(Australia) Grant Elliot	98	9	7	7	6	8	Ret	3	9	6	5	6	4	15	13	11	477
9	(Australia) Ron Searle	95	16	10	9	11	13	8	8	10	10	7	10	16	13	11	15	387
10	(Australia) Grant Johnson	110	13	8	8	12	9	19	11	8	Ret	4	7	9	14	10	13	377
11	(Australia) Ross Halliday	61	17	15	14	14	12	10	15	15	13	9	12	15	10	8	12	357
12	(Australia) Kevin Mundy	56	10	9	15	20	11	7	7	18	20	16	11	13	11	DNS	DNS	307
13	(Australia) Luke Youlden	30				7	4	3							4	5	4	287
14	(Australia) Michael Turner	90	Ret	17	18	9	10	13	12	Ret	12	8	21	10	DNS	15	17	284
15	(Australia) Terry Wyhoon	25	8	5	Ret	Ret	Ret	9	20	7	9	DNS	23	Ret	16	9	14	255
16	(Australia) Mark Howard	94	18	Ret	Ret	16	18	15	18	19	17	Ret	16	12	20	16	20	226
17	(Australia) Shane Beikoff	68	19	13	12				16	13	14				17	14	16	193
18	(Australia) Leanne Ferrier	74	DNS	DNS	DNS				9	Ret	DNS	18	8	Ret	6	4	7	182
19	(Australia) Clyde Lawrence	140	21	21	17	Ret	19	17				12	17	18	19	Ret	19	181
20	(Australia) Robert Jones	69	Ret	Ret	Ret	19	Ret	Ret				6	18	8	12	12	10	176
21	(Australia) Michael Simpson	93	5	12	5	Ret	Ret	DNS	Ret	DNS	DNS	Ret	Ret	21	Ret	DNS	9	163
22	(Australia) Bob McDonald	26	22	20	DNS	Ret	Ret	Ret	17	16	16	Ret	14	Ret	18	17	18	156
23	(Australia) Robert Smith	72	20	16	19	17	Ret	Ret	19	17	19	Ret	DNS	19	DNS	DNS	DNS	139
24	(Australia) Mathew Hunt	38	15	DNS	10	18	Ret	Ret	14	12	18							131
25	(Australia) Richard Mork	77	Ret	DNS	DNS				Ret	11	15	13	15	11				120
26	(Australia) Craig Bastian	47	DNS	DNS	DNS	8	20	18	10	Ret	11							118
27	(Australia) Rod Salmon	87	14	14	16	15	15	DNS										100
28	(Australia) Phill Foster	68				Ret	16	14				15	19	20				98
29	(Australia) Andrew Jones	20										17	9	7				83
30	(Australia) Tony Evangelou	300				13	14	11				DNS	DNS	DNS				72
31	(Australia) Wesley May	99	12	Ret	DNS	DNS	17	12	DNS	DNS	DNS							69
32	(Australia) Paul Freestone	79										11	13	17				66
33	(Australia) Derek van Zelm	58	Ret	18	11	DNS	DNS	DNS										48
34	(Australia) Bob Thorn	30	11	19	Ret													36
–	(Australia) David Skillender	70													DNS	DNS	DNS	0
Pos.	Driver	No.	WAK (New South Wales)			PHI (Victoria (state))			ORA (New South Wales)			WIN (Victoria (state))			MAL (South Australia)			Points

Colour	Result
Gold	Winner
Silver	Second place
Bronze	Third place
Green	Points classification
Blue	Non-points classification
Blue	Non-classified finish (NC)
Purple	Retired, not classified (Ret)
Red	Did not qualify (DNQ)
Red	Did not pre-qualify (DNPQ)
Black	Disqualified (DSQ)
White	Did not start (DNS)
White	Withdrew (WD)
White	Race cancelled (C)
Blank	Did not practice (DNP)
Blank	Did not arrive (DNA)
Blank	Excluded (EX)

== See also ==
- 2002 V8 Supercar season
