= David Clark (racing driver) =

Australian racing driver

- Nationality: Australian
- Born: 31 August 1978 (age 48) Perth, Western Australia, Australia

V8 Supercar Development Series
- Years active: 2006
- Teams: Optima Sport
- Best finish: 19th in 2006 Fujitsu V8 Supercar Series

Previous series
- 2001 2002: Australian Formula Ford Championship; British Formula Three Championship

David Clark (born in Perth, Western Australia on 31 August 1978) is an Australian racing driver who competed in the Fujitsu V8 Supercar touring car racing series.

Clark's main achievements came from his kart racing career as a 14-time State Karting Champion and four-time Australian Karting Champion. He was also ninth in the World Junior Karting Championship (1993) and twice contested the World Senior Karting Championship (1995, 1996).

Clark also drove in the open-wheeled Australian Formula Ford and British Formula Three. His V8 Supercar series debut was in a Ford Falcon in 2006.

== 2006 accident ==
Clark was involved in the fatal crash of V8 Supercar driver Mark Porter at Mount Panorama Circuit. In an effort to avoid the stalled Porter, he slid his car sideways whilst travelling at high speed. The front right hand side of his car hit the driver's side door of Porter's car, crushing the side of the car. The front right hand of Porter's car also hit the drivers door of Clark, critically injuring him. Marshals were quick to arrive at the scene where one, unable to open the driver's door on Porter's car, opened the rear door in an attempt to check his condition. Both drivers were unconscious at the time. The race was called to an immediate stop and all racing was suspended for two hours while police combed for clues as to what happened.

Porter died in late afternoon of Sunday 8 October 2006 as the feature race was concluding. Just two hours after the race, Porter's family issued a statement announcing his death.

Clark eventually recovered and returned to racing in 2007.

== Career results ==
Season	Series	Position	Car	Team
1996	Australian Formula Ford Championship	9th	Van Diemen RF95 Ford	Australian Motor Sport Academy
2001	Australian Formula Ford Championship	9th	Van Diemen RF01 Ford	Optima Sport
2002	British Formula Three Championship; Scholarship Class	12th	Dallara F301 Spiess Opel	Team Park
2006	V8 Supercar Development Series	19th	Ford BA Falcon	Optima Sport
