= 2002 V8 Supercar season =

Seasons
- ← 2001 2003 →

The 2002 V8 Supercar season was the 43rd year of touring car racing in Australia since the first runnings of the Australian Touring Car Championship and the fore-runner of the present day Bathurst 1000, the Armstrong 500.

There were 20 V8 Supercar events held during 2002; a thirteen-round 2002 V8 Supercar Championship Series (VCS), two of them endurance races; a five-round second tier V8 Supercar series 2002 Konica V8 Supercar Series (KVS) along with a non-point scoring race supporting the Bathurst 1000 and a V8 Supercar support programme event at the 2002 Australian Grand Prix.

== Results and standings ==
=== Race calendar ===
The 2002 Australian V8 Super season consisted of 20 events.

Date	Series	Circuit	City / State	Winner	Team	Car	Report
1–3 Mar	Netspace V8 Supercar Challenge	Albert Park Street Circuit	Melbourne, Victoria	Craig Lowndes	00 Motorsport	Ford AU Falcon	report
16–17 Mar	Clipsal 500 VCS Round 1	Adelaide Street Circuit	Adelaide, South Australia	Mark Skaife	Holden Racing Team	Holden VX Commodore	report
31 Mar	KVS Round 1	Wakefield Park	Goulburn, New South Wales	Dale Brede	Harris Racing	Ford AU Falcon	
14 Apr	VCS Round 2	Phillip Island Grand Prix Circuit	Phillip Island, Victoria	Mark Skaife	Holden Racing Team	Holden VX Commodore	
27–28 Apr	VCS Round 3	Eastern Creek Raceway	Sydney, New South Wales	Mark Skaife	Holden Racing Team	Holden VX Commodore	
5 May	KVS Round 2	Phillip Island Grand Prix Circuit	Phillip Island, Victoria	Paul Dumbrell	Independent Race Cars Australia	Holden VX Commodore	
18–19 May	VCS Round 4	Hidden Valley Raceway	Darwin, Northern Territory	Mark Skaife	Holden Racing Team	Holden VX Commodore	
8–9 Jun	Stegbar 400 VCS Round 5	Canberra Street Circuit	Canberra, Australian Capital Territory	Mark Skaife	Holden Racing Team	Holden VX Commodore	
16 Jun	KVS Round 3	Oran Park Raceway	Sydney, New South Wales	Paul Dumbrell	Independent Race Cars Australia	Holden VX Commodore	
29–30 Jun	VB 400 VCS Round 6	Wanneroo Raceway	Perth, Western Australia	Jason Bright	Holden Racing Team	Holden VX Commodore	
7 Jul	KVS Round 4	Winton Motor Raceway	Benalla, Victoria	Paul Dumbrell	Independent Race Cars Australia	Holden VX Commodore	
28 Jul	VCS Round 7	Oran Park Raceway	Sydney, New South Wales	Mark Skaife	Holden Racing Team	Holden VX Commodore	
4 Aug	KVS Round 5	Mallala Motor Sport Park	Adelaide, South Australia	Paul Dumbrell	Independent Race Cars Australia	Holden VX Commodore	
18 Aug	VCS Round 8	Winton Motor Raceway	Benalla, Victoria	Jason Bright	Holden Racing Team	Holden VX Commodore	
15 Sep	VIP Pet Foods Queensland 500 VCS Round 9	Queensland Raceway	Ipswich, Queensland	David Besnard; Simon Wills	Stone Brothers Racing	Ford AU Falcon	report
6–7 Oct	Konica V8 Supercar Challenge Race	Mount Panorama Circuit	Bathurst, New South Wales	Luke Youlden	Steven Ellery Racing	Ford AU Falcon	report
6–7 Oct	Bob Jane T-Marts 1000 VCS Round 10	Mount Panorama Circuit	Bathurst, New South Wales	Mark Skaife; Jim Richards	Holden Racing Team	Holden VX Commodore	report
27–28 Oct	Gillette V8 Supercar Challenge VCS Round 11	Surfers Paradise Street Circuit	Surfers Paradise, Queensland	Jason Bargwanna	Garry Rogers Motorsport	Holden VX Commodore	
10–11 Nov	Boost Mobile V8 International VCS Round 12	Pukekohe Park Raceway	Pukekohe, New Zealand	Greg Murphy	K-Mart Racing Team	Holden VX Commodore	
30 Nov - 1 Dec	Betta Electrical V8 Ultimate VCS Round 13	Sandown Raceway	Melbourne, Victoria	Marcos Ambrose	Stone Brothers Racing	Ford AU Falcon	

=== Netspace V8 Supercar Challenge ===
This meeting was a support event of the 2002 Australian Grand Prix.

Driver	No.	Team	Car	Race 1	Race 2	Race 3
(Australia) Craig Lowndes	00	00 Motorsport	Ford AU Falcon	12	5	1
(Australia) Russell Ingall	8	Perkins Engineering	Holden VX Commodore	3	4	2
(Australia) Garth Tander	34	Garry Rogers Motorsport	Holden VX Commodore	8	9	3
(Australia) Jason Bright	2	Holden Racing Team	Holden VX Commodore	1	1	4
(New Zealand) Steven Richards	16	Perkins Engineering	Holden VX Commodore	6	8	5
(New Zealand) Simon Wills	60	Briggs Motor Sport	Ford AU Falcon	17	22	6
(New Zealand) Greg Murphy	51	K-Mart Racing Team	Holden VX Commodore	7	6	7
(Australia) Jason Bargwanna	35	Garry Rogers Motorsport	Holden VX Commodore	20	20	8
(Australia) Todd Kelly	15	K-Mart Racing Team	Holden VX Commodore	14	7	9
(Australia) Marcos Ambrose	4	Stone Brothers Racing	Ford AU Falcon	13	10	10
(Australia) Steven Johnson	17	Dick Johnson Racing	Ford AU Falcon	2	13	11
(Australia) Mark Skaife	1	Holden Racing Team	Holden VX Commodore	5	2	12
(Australia) Brad Jones	21	Brad Jones Racing	Ford AU Falcon	25	27	13
(New Zealand) John Faulkner	46	John Faulkner Racing	Holden VX Commodore	22	15	14
(Australia) Tony Longhurst	66	Briggs Motor Sport	Ford AU Falcon	17	22	15
(New Zealand) Craig Baird	54	Rod Nash Racing	Holden VX Commodore	18	19	16
(Australia) Paul Weel	43	Paul Weel Racing	Ford AU Falcon	11	11	17
(New Zealand) Jason Richards	69	Team Kiwi Racing	Holden VX Commodore	19	16	18
(Australia) Larry Perkins	11	Castrol Perkins Racing	Holden VX Commodore	26	26	19
(Australia) Anthony Tratt	75	Paul Little Racing	Ford AU Falcon	29	24	20
(Australia) David Besnard	9	Stone Brothers Racing	Ford AU Falcon	9	DNF	21
(Australia) Rodney Forbes	7	00 Motorsport	Ford AU Falcon	28	DNF	22
(Australia) Steve Ellery	31	Supercheap Auto Racing	Ford AU Falcon	10	DNF	24
(Australia) Neil Crompton	27	00 Motorsport	Ford AU Falcon	23	25	25
(Australia) Cameron McConville	3	Lansvale Racing Team	Holden VX Commodore	31	14	26
(Australia) Cameron McLean	40	Paragon Motorsport	Ford AU Falcon	16	29	27
(Australia) Mark Larkham	10	Larkham Motor Sport	Ford AU Falcon	DNF	28	28
(Australia) Rick Kelly	02	Holden Racing Team	Holden VX Commodore	30	12	29
(New Zealand) Paul Radisich	18	Dick Johnson Racing	Ford AU Falcon	4	3	DNF
(Australia) Glenn Seton	5	Ford Tickford Racing	Ford AU Falcon	15	17	DNF
(Australia) John Bowe	88	Brad Jones Racing	Ford AU Falcon	DNF	18	DNF
(Australia) Paul Romano	24	Romano Racing	Holden VX Commodore	24	23	DNF
(Australia) Paul Morris	29	Paul Morris Motorsport	Holden VX Commodore	21	DNF	DNF

=== Konica V8 Supercar Challenge Race ===
This race was a support event of the 2002 Bob Jane T-Marts 1000.

Driver	No.	Team	Car	Grid	Race
(Australia) Luke Youlden	30	Supercheap Auto Racing	Ford AU Falcon	1	1
(Australia) Wayne Wakefield	67	Paul Morris Motorsport	Holden VX Commodore	2	2
(Australia) Matthew White	76	Matthew White Racing	Holden VX Commodore	4	3
(Australia) Terry Wyhoon	25	Terry Wyhoon Racing	Ford EL Falcon	9	4
(Australia) Andrew Jones	20	Brad Jones Racing	Ford AU Falcon	3	5
(Australia) Craig Bastian	47		Ford EL Falcon	7	6
(Australia) Grant Elliott	98	Sydney Star Racing	Holden VS Commodore	16	7
(Australia) Tony Evangelou	300	ANT Racing	Holden VS Commodore	15	8
(Australia) Dean Crosswell	72	Robert Smith Racing	Holden VT Commodore	5	9
(Australia) Peter Doulman	24	M3 Motorsport	Holden VT Commodore	23	10
(Australia) Ron Searle	95	Phoenix Motorsport	Holden VS Commodore	22	11
(Australia) Phonsy Mullan	89	GM Motorsport	Holden VS Commodore	14	12
(Australia) Mathew Hunt	38	South Pacific Motor Sport	Holden VS Commodore	10	DNF
(Australia) Todd Wanless	90		Holden VS Commodore	12	DNF
(Australia) Paul Freestone	79	Spiess Heckler Racing	Holden VS Commodore	21	DNF
(Australia) Richard Mork	77	V8 Racing	Holden VS Commodore	20	DNF
(Australia) Clyde Lawrence	140	Clyde Lawrence Racing	Holden VS Commodore	18	DNF
(Australia) Michael Simpson	93	Michael Simpson Racing	Ford EL Falcon	6	DNF
(Australia) Robert Jones	69	Spiess Heckler Racing	Holden VX Commodore	8	DNF
(Australia) Kevin Mundy	89	Harris Racing	Ford AU Falcon	11	DNF
(Australia) Phill Foster	68	Beikoff Racing	Holden VS Commodore	17	DNF
(Australia) Mark Howard	94	Michael Simpson Racing	Ford EL Falcon	19	DNF
(Australia) Tim Rowse	58	Motorsport Engineering Services	Holden VS Commodore	13	DNF
