= Mark Porter (racing driver) =

New Zealand racing driver

- Nationality: New Zealander
- Born: Mark Robert Porter; 2 October 1974 Hamilton, Waikato, New Zealand
- Died: 8 October 2006 (aged 32) Sydney, Australia

V8 Supercar Development Series
- Years active: 2002–2006
- Teams: Independent Race Cars; MSport; Team Kiwi Racing
- Starts: 30
- Best finish: 3rd in 2003 & 2004 Konica Minolta V8 Supercar Series

Mark Robert "Didley" Porter (2 October 1974 – 8 October 2006) was a New Zealand racing driver who competed in the Fujitsu V8 Supercar touring car racing series in Australia.

His V8 Supercar series debut was in a Ford Falcon at Wakefield Park in 2002, and he debuted in the Bathurst 1000 the same year.

== Racing death ==
In the 2006 Fujitsu V8 Supercar Series, Porter drove a Hyundai/Hydraulink sponsored Holden VZ Commodore for the M-Sport team. Porter was third in the championship point standings after 14 races of the 18 race season, when the competition moved to the Mount Panorama Circuit in Bathurst, New South Wales for a weekend of races in the Fujitsu and other series.

During the race on Friday 6 October 2006, Porter clipped a wall, causing him to lose control of his car in a curve, coming to a stop sideways on the track, with his driver's side facing the oncoming cars. A number of cars evaded Porter's stalled vehicle before Chris Alajajian's car connected with the tail of Porter's. Driver David Clark approached the scene at 180 kilometres per hour (110 mph) then slid his own car sideways, with his front right side crumpling the driver's side of Porter's passenger compartment. Both Porter and Clark were unconscious and critically injured when the safety marshals arrived. The race was cancelled and all other racing events were suspended for two hours.

Porter was taken by ambulance to Bathurst Base Hospital and later that day airlifted to Royal Prince Alfred Hospital in Sydney with serious head and chest injuries. Porter died in the late afternoon of Sunday 8 October 2006. He was survived by his wife Adrienne and his (then) two-year-old son Flynn.

== Tributes and legacy ==
Porter had been hired by Brad Jones Racing to co-drive one of their entries in the 8 October 2006 Bathurst 1000 endurance race, the main event at the Mount Panorama Circuit that weekend. When driver Michael Caruso took on Porter's duties, the team added Caruso's name to the car rather than just replacing Porter's. The team also added Porter's Fujitsu V8 Supercar Series number, #111, beside his name on the Bathurst 1000 car.

After his death, good friend and team owner Paul Cruikshank ran Porter's #111 at the next V8 Supercar round at Surfers Paradise. #111 was used as a memorial to Porter on the Paul Cruickshank Racing Falcon up until the team folded in 2009. The Mark Porter trophy was awarded to winners of the Hamilton 400 street race until the demise of the event in 2012. Mark's brother Andrew, a former truck racer, contested the 2007/08 NZV8 series in the Hydraulink #111 Ford BF Falcon.

New Zealand team Super Black Racing entered the Supercars Championship series in 2014, using #111 as a tribute to countryman Porter.

== Results ==
=== Complete Bathurst 1000 results ===
Year	Team	Car	Co-driver	Position	Laps
2002	Paul Weel Racing	Ford Falcon AU	(Australia) Geoff Full	DNF	93
2003	Team Kiwi Racing	Holden Commodore VX	(New Zealand) Craig Baird	17th	149
2004	Team Kiwi Racing	Holden Commodore VY	(New Zealand) Craig Baird	DNF	129
2005	Team Dynamik	Holden Commodore VZ	(New Zealand) Kayne Scott	11th	158
2006	Brad Jones Racing	Ford Falcon BA	(Australia) Dale Brede (Australia) Michael Caruso‡	DNF	59

‡ Porter died from injuries following a support race prior to the event. He was replaced with Caruso.
