= 2006 V8 Supercar season =

Seasons
- ← 2005 2007 →

The 2006 V8 Supercar season was the 47th year of touring car racing in Australia since the first runnings of the Australian Touring Car Championship and the fore-runner of the present day Bathurst 1000, the Armstrong 500.

There were 21 V8 Supercar meetings held during 2006; a thirteen-round series for V8 Supercars, the 2006 V8 Supercar Championship Series (VCS), two of them endurance races; a seven-round second tier V8 Supercar series 2006 Fujitsu V8 Supercar Series (FVS) and a V8 Supercar support programme event at the 2006 Australian Grand Prix.

This was the last season of V8 Supercars broadcast by Network Ten and Fox Sports; at the conclusion of 2006 the broadcasting rights were handed over to the Seven Network from 2007 to 2014. However, since 2015 Network Ten and Fox Sports are still permitted to revive their V8 Supercars rights with Ten shows seven events live plus highlights and Fox Sports shows every practice, qualifying and race live.

== Season review ==
Rick Kelly won the championship. It came down to the last race, where Rick Kelly narrowly beat Craig Lowndes for the championship.

== Results and standings ==
=== Race calendar ===
The 2006 V8 Supercar season consisted of 21 events.

Date	Series	Circuit	City / state	Winner	Team	Car	Report
24–26 Mar	FVS Round 1	Adelaide Street Circuit	Adelaide, South Australia	Adam Macrow	Howard Racing	Ford BA Falcon	
24–26 Mar	Clipsal 500 VCS Round 1	Adelaide Street Circuit	Adelaide, South Australia	Jamie Whincup	Team Betta Electrical	Ford BA Falcon	report
31 Mar - 2 Apr	Panasonic V8 Supercars GP 100	Albert Park street circuit	Melbourne, Victoria	Steven Richards	Perkins Engineering	Holden VZ Commodore	report
22–23 Apr	PlaceMakers V8 International VCS Round 2	Pukekohe Park Raceway	Pukekohe, New Zealand	Mark Skaife	Holden Racing Team	Holden VZ Commodore	
12–14 May	The Perth V8 400 VCS Round 3	Barbagallo Raceway	Perth, Western Australia	Steven Richards	Perkins Engineering	Holden VZ Commodore	
28 May	FVS Round 2	Wakefield Park	Goulburn, New South Wales	Adam Macrow	Howard Racing	Ford BA Falcon	
2–4 Jun	VCS Round 4	Winton Motor Raceway	Benalla, Victoria	Craig Lowndes	Team Betta Electrical	Ford BA Falcon	
1–2 Jul	Skycity Triple Crown VCS Round 5	Hidden Valley Raceway	Darwin, Northern Territory	Craig Lowndes	Team Betta Electrical	Ford BA Falcon	
21–23 Jul	FVS Round 3	Queensland Raceway	Ipswich, Queensland	Adam Macrow	Howard Racing	Ford BA Falcon	
21–23 Jul	BigPond 400 VCS Round 6	Queensland Raceway	Ipswich, Queensland	Garth Tander	HSV Dealer Team	Holden VZ Commodore	
11–13 Aug	FVS Round 4	Oran Park Raceway	Sydney, New South Wales	Adam Macrow	Howard Racing	Ford BA Falcon	
11–13 Aug	VCS Round 7	Oran Park Raceway	Sydney, New South Wales	Craig Lowndes	Team Betta Electrical	Ford BA Falcon	
1–2 Sep	Betta Electrical 500 VCS Round 8	Sandown Raceway	Melbourne, Victoria	Jason Bright; Mark Winterbottom	Ford Performance Racing	Ford BA Falcon	report
17 Sep	FVS Round 5	Mallala Motor Sport Park	Mallala, South Australia	Adam Macrow	Howard Racing	Ford BA Falcon	
5–8 Oct	FVS Round 6	Mount Panorama Circuit	Bathurst, New South Wales	Andrew Thompson	Dick Johnson Racing	Ford BA Falcon	
5–8 Oct	Supercheap Auto 1000 VCS Round 9	Mount Panorama Circuit	Bathurst, New South Wales	Craig Lowndes; Jamie Whincup	Team Betta Electrical	Ford BA Falcon	report
20–22 Oct	Gillette V8 Supercar Challenge VCS Round 10	Surfers Paradise Street Circuit	Surfers Paradise, Queensland	Todd Kelly	Holden Racing Team	Holden VZ Commodore	
10–12 Nov	Ferodo Triple Challenge VCS Round 11	Symmons Plains Raceway	Launceston, Tasmania	Garth Tander	HSV Dealer Team	Holden VZ Commodore	
23–25 Nov	Desert 400 VCS Round 12	Bahrain International Circuit	Manama, Bahrain	Jason Bright	Ford Performance Racing	Ford BA Falcon	
8–10 Dec	FVS Round 7	Phillip Island Grand Prix Circuit	Phillip Island, Victoria	Andrew Thompson	Dick Johnson Racing	Ford BA Falcon	
8–10 Dec	Caterpillar Grand Finale VCS Round 13	Phillip Island Grand Prix Circuit	Phillip Island, Victoria	Todd Kelly	Holden Racing Team	Holden VZ Commodore	

=== Panasonic V8 Supercars GP 100 ===
This meeting was a support event of the 2006 Australian Grand Prix.

Driver	No.	Team	Car	Race 1	GP 100	Race 3
(New Zealand) Steven Richards	7	Perkins Engineering	Holden VZ Commodore	9	1	1
(Australia) Mark Skaife	2	Holden Racing Team	Holden VZ Commodore	2	2	2
(Australia) Todd Kelly	22	Holden Racing Team	Holden VZ Commodore	1	3	3
(Australia) Garth Tander	16	HSV Dealer Team	Holden VZ Commodore	14	5	4
(Australia) Craig Lowndes	888	Team Betta Electrical	Ford BA Falcon	3	4	5
(Australia) Will Davison	18	Dick Johnson Racing	Ford BA Falcon	7	7	6
(Australia) Mark Winterbottom	5	Ford Performance Racing	Ford BA Falcon	6	6	7
(Australia) Paul Dumbrell	11	Perkins Engineering	Holden VZ Commodore	4	8	8
(Australia) Jamie Whincup	88	Team Betta Electrical	Ford BA Falcon	20	9	9
(New Zealand) Paul Radisich	021	Team Kiwi Racing	Holden VZ Commodore	13	11	10
(Australia) John Bowe	12	Brad Jones Racing	Ford BA Falcon	16	12	11
(Australia) Russell Ingall	1	Stone Brothers Racing	Ford BA Falcon	15	10	12
(Australia) Dean Canto	34	Garry Rogers Motorsport	Holden VZ Commodore	17	13	13
(Australia) Jason Bargwanna	10	WPS Racing	Ford BA Falcon	11	14	14
(Australia) James Courtney	4	Stone Brothers Racing	Ford BA Falcon	DNF	15	15
(Australia) Jason Bright	6	Ford Performance Racing	Ford BA Falcon	8	24	16
(Australia) Steven Johnson	17	Dick Johnson Racing	Ford BA Falcon	10	27	17
(Australia) Andrew Jones	23	Tasman Motorsport	Holden VZ Commodore	22	21	18
(Australia) Steve Owen	55	Rod Nash Racing	Holden VZ Commodore	18	17	19
(Australia) Brad Jones	14	Brad Jones Racing	Ford BA Falcon	19	25	20
(Australia) Marcus Marshall	20	Paul Cruickshank Racing	Ford BA Falcon	25	26	21
(Australia) Jack Perkins	51	Perkins Engineering	Holden VZ Commodore	26	22	22
(New Zealand) Fabian Coulthard	39	Paul Morris Motorsport	Holden VZ Commodore	21	19	23
(Australia) Cameron McConville	50	Paul Weel Racing	Holden VZ Commodore	5	18	24
(Australia) José Fernández	26	Britek Motorsport	Ford BA Falcon	DNF	23	25
(Brazil) Max Wilson	8	WPS Racing	Ford BA Falcon	12	20	DNF
(Australia) Paul Morris	67	Paul Morris Motorsport	Holden VZ Commodore	24	16	DNF
(Australia) Lee Holdsworth	33	Garry Rogers Motorsport	Holden VZ Commodore	23	DNS	DNS
(Australia) Warren Luff	25	Britek Motorsport	Ford BA Falcon	27	DNS	DNS
(New Zealand) Jason Richards	3	Tasman Motorsport	Holden VZ Commodore	28	DNS	DNS
(Australia) Rick Kelly	15	HSV Dealer Team	Holden VZ Commodore	DNF	DNS	DNS
