= Matthew Hunt =

English cricketer (born 1977)

Personal information
- Full name: Matthew Paul Hunt
- Born: 10 June 1977 (age 49); Newton Abbot, Devon, England
- Batting: Right-handed
- Bowling: Right-arm medium

Domestic team information
- Years: Team
- 1995–2006: Devon

Career statistics
Competition	List A
Matches	5
Runs scored	206
Batting average	41.20
100s/50s	–/2
Top score	74
Balls bowled	–
Wickets	–
Bowling average	–
5 wickets in innings	–
10 wickets in match	–
Best bowling	–
Catches/stumpings	–/–
- Source: Cricinfo, 1 February 2011

Matthew Paul Hunt (born 10 June 1977) is an English cricketer. Hunt is a right-handed batsman who bowls right-arm medium pace. He was born at Newton Abbot, Devon.

Hunt made his debut for Devon in the 1995 Minor Counties Championship against Wiltshire. Between 1995 and 2006, he represented the county in 38 Championship matches, the last of which came against Dorset. In 1999, he made his debut for Devon in the MCCA Knockout Trophy, which came against Dorset. From 1999 to 2006, he represented the county in 12 Trophy matches, the last of which came against Dorset.

2002 saw him make his List A debut for Devon, against Cumberland in the 2nd round of the 2003 Cheltenham & Gloucester Trophy which was played in 2002. From 2002 to 2004, he represented the county in 5 List A matches, the last of which came against Yorkshire at The Maer Ground in the 3rd round of the 2004 Cheltenham & Gloucester Trophy. In his 5 List A matches, he scored 206 runs at a batting average of 41.20, with a single two half centuries and a high score of 72.

Hunt has played Second XI cricket for the Somerset Second XI and the Gloucestershire Second XI.
