= Luke Youlden =

Australian racing driver

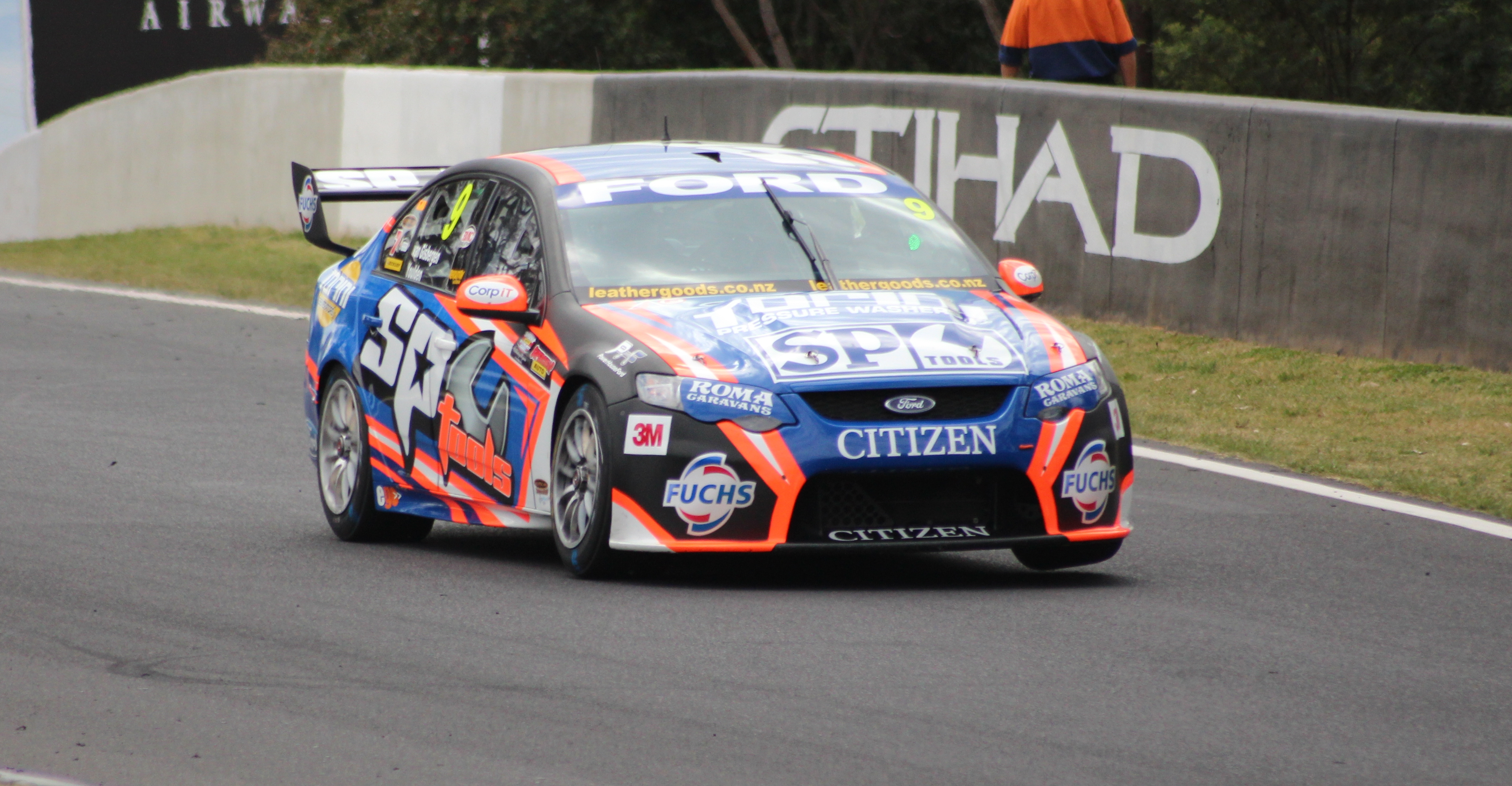
- Nationality: Australian
- Born: Luke Gerard Youlden; 28 January 1978 (age 48) Melbourne, Victoria, Australia
- Categorisation: FIA Silver (until 2017, 2020–); FIA Gold (2018–2019)

Supercars Championship career
- Current team: Kelly Grove Racing (Endurance race co-driver)
- Championships: 0
- Races: 61
- Wins: 1
- Podiums: 8
- Pole positions: 5
- 2021 position: 27th (328 pts)

Luke Gerard Youlden (born 28 January 1978) is an Australian Supercars series racing driver. He is the son of two-time Australian Production Car champion Kent Youlden. Youlden currently drives for Kelly Grove Racing as a co-driver alongside David Reynolds in the No. 26 Ford Mustang GT. Outside racing, Youlden works at a performance driving school with fellow Supercars racer Dean Canto. He co-drove to victory with David Reynolds in the 2017 Supercheap Auto Bathurst 1000.

== Racing career ==
Youlden's career started in the Victorian Formula Ford Championship in 1995 while he was completing Year 12. Due to a lack of funds, Youlden didn't progress to the national championship and remained in the Victorian series. At the same time, he joined Dugal McDougall Motorsport as an engineer and a driver. In 1999, Youlden was involved with Greg Ritter's Australian Formula Ford title win and with Ritter driving in the Bathurst 1000 that year, Youlden took his seat at the Bathurst support races. Youlden won both races and this, coupled with his victory in the Victorian series, allowed him to enter the national series in 2000. Youlden won the 2000 Australian Formula Ford Championship and also competed in the British Formula Ford Festival. He made his Bathurst debut the same year, driving for Perkins Motorsport alongside Christian Murchison. The pair were running inside the top five until a broken valve spring put them out of the race.

Youlden competed in the Australian GT Production Car Championship in 2001, winning Class E in a Holden Astra. He again competed for Perkins Motorsport in the V8 Supercar endurance races but was unable to secure a full-time drive for 2002. Youlden settled for what was then called the Konica Series, driving a Ford Falcon (AU) for Steven Ellery Racing, and would drive with Steven Ellery in the Queensland 500 and Bathurst 1000. Youlden and Ellery finished ninth at Bathurst and Youlden finished the Konica Series in 13th place after a bad start to the season hurt his championship chances. Youlden continued to drive for Steven Ellery Racing in both the Konica Series and the endurance races in 2003 and 2004. Youlden and Ellery finished on the podium in both endurance races in 2003 and the following year Youlden finished second in the Konica Series. Youlden was actually tied on points with series champion Andrew Jones but lost the title on a countback of round wins.

With Steven Ellery Racing dropping out the V8 Supercar Championship Series in 2005, Youlden was hired by Stone Brothers Racing to drive alongside Russell Ingall in that year's endurance races. The pair finished inside the top-ten in both endurance races, helping Ingall to the 2005 title. Youlden remained with the team for 2006 and came perilously close to a second podium a Bathurst when he and Ingall finished in fourth place, just one one-hundredth of a second behind teammates James Courtney and Glenn Seton.

Youlden joined Ford Performance Racing for the 2008 endurance races, driving the team's second car with Dean Canto. The pair finished seventh at Bathurst and teamed together again in 2009, finishing ninth at the L&H 500 but failing to finish at Bathurst after Canto hit the wall at The Esses late in the race. 2010 saw the introduction of a rule stating that each team's regular drivers were not allowed to be paired together at the endurance races. This rule saw Youlden get paired up with Mark Winterbottom for the L&H 500 and the Bathurst 1000. Youlden and Winterbottom finished second at the L&H 500 and were on pole for Bathurst, however a delaminated tyre put Youlden into the wall in the middle of the race and this put them out of contention. Youlden was placed in the #6 car for 2011 alongside Will Davison and Youlden collected his first series pole position when the pair claimed the top grid spot at the L&H 500. After balance issues during the race, Youlden and Davison finished third behind the two Team Vodafone cars. Davison led the opening stint of the Bathurst 1000 but Youlden went off at Murray's Corner on the first safety car restart and hit the tyre wall. The pair recovered to finish on the lead lap, albeit in 18th place.

Youlden returned to Stone Brothers Racing in 2012 to partner Shane van Gisbergen. The pair scored pole position for the Sandown 500 before going on to finish fifth in the race. Van Gisbergen qualified the car in third for the Bathurst 1000 but the pair would only manage to finish the race in twelfth place. Youlden joined Brad Jones Racing for 2013 to drive alongside Fabian Coulthard in the new Endurance Cup. The duo finished in ninth place in the Endurance Cup standings, with a second-place finish in the second race of the Gold Coast 600.

In November 2021, Youlden would make his Supercars sprint debut when he was drafted by Kelly Grove Racing to drive the #26 Penrite Racing Mustang in place of David Reynolds. Reynolds was forced out of competition for Rounds 9-11 due to his COVID health exemption being overturned.

== Career results ==
Season	Series	Position	Car	Team
2000	Australian Formula Ford Championship	**1st**	Mygale SJ2000	Dugal McDougal Motorsport
2001	Australian GT Production Car Championship (Class E)	**1st**	Holden Astra SRi	Luke Youlden
2001	V8 Supercar Championship Series	63rd	Holden Commodore (VX)	Perkins Motorsport
2002	V8 Supercar Development Series	13th	Ford Falcon (AU)	Steven Ellery Racing
2002	V8 Supercar Championship Series	40th	Ford Falcon (AU)	Steven Ellery Racing
2003	V8 Supercar Development Series	5th	Ford Falcon (AU)	Steven Ellery Racing
2003	V8 Supercar Championship Series	35th	Ford Falcon (BA)	Steven Ellery Racing
2004	V8 Supercar Development Series	**2nd**	Ford Falcon (AU)	Steven Ellery Racing
2004	V8 Supercar Championship Series	40th	Ford Falcon (BA)	Steven Ellery Racing
2005	Australian Carrera Cup Championship	4th	Porsche 996 GT3 Cup	VIP Pet Foods Racing
2005	V8 Supercar Championship Series	40th	Ford Falcon (BA)	Stone Brothers Racing
2005–06	New Zealand V8s	5th	Ford Falcon (BA)	
2006	V8 Supercar Development Series	22nd	Ford Falcon (AU); Ford Falcon (BA)	Peters Motorsport; Dick Johnson Racing
2006	V8 Supercar Championship Series	37th	Ford Falcon (BA)	Stone Brothers Racing
2006	Australian Carrera Cup Championship	16th	Porsche 997 GT3 Cup	Fitzgerald Racing
2006–07	New Zealand V8s	9th	Ford Falcon (BA)	
2007	V8 Supercar Development Series	5th	Ford Falcon (BA); Ford Falcon (AU)	A.N.T. Racing; McGill Motorsport
2007	V8 Supercar Championship Series	34th	Ford Falcon (BF)	Stone Brothers Racing
2007-08	New Zealand V8s	10th	Ford Falcon (BA)	
2008	V8 Supercar Development Series	29th	Ford Falcon (BA)	Howard Racing
2008	V8 Supercar Championship Series	38th	Ford Falcon (BF)	Ford Performance Racing
2008	Kerrick Sports Sedan Series	5th	Ford Mustang	
2008–09	New Zealand V8s	21st	Ford Falcon (BF)	Autotek
2009	V8 Supercar Championship Series	52nd	Ford Falcon (FG)	Ford Performance Racing
2010	V8 Supercar Development Series	40th	Ford Falcon (BF)	MW Motorsport
2010	V8 Supercar Championship Series	32nd	Ford Falcon (FG)	Ford Performance Racing
2010	Australian Mini Challenge	23rd	Mini Cooper S JCW R56	
2011	International V8 Supercars Championship	37th	Ford Falcon (FG)	Ford Performance Racing
2012	Dunlop V8 Supercar Series	5th	Ford Falcon (BF)	MW Motorsport
2012	International V8 Supercars Championship	36th	Ford Falcon (FG)	Stone Brothers Racing
2013	International V8 Supercars Championship	38th	Holden Commodore (VF)	Brad Jones Racing
2014	International V8 Supercars Championship	32nd	Holden Commodore (VF)	Brad Jones Racing
2015	International V8 Supercars Championship	33rd	Holden Commodore (VF)	Brad Jones Racing
2016	International V8 Supercars Championship	34th	Ford FG X Falcon	DJR Team Penske
2017	Virgin Australia Supercars Championship	38th	Holden Commodore (VF)	Erebus Motorsport
2018	Virgin Australia Supercars Championship	34th	Holden Commodore (ZB)	Erebus Motorsport
2019	Virgin Australia Supercars Championship	38th	Holden Commodore (ZB)	Erebus Motorsport
2021	Repco Supercars Championship	11th	Ford Mustang GT (S550)	Kelly Grove Racing

=== Super2 Series results ===
(key) (Races in bold indicate pole position) (Races in italics indicate fastest lap)

Super2 Series results
Year	Team	No.	Car	1	2	3	4	5	6	7	8	9	10	11	12	13	14	15	16	17	18	Position	Points
2002	Steven Ellery Racing	30	Ford AU Falcon	WAK; R1	WAK; R2	WAK; R3	PHI; R4; 7	PHI; R5; 4	PHI; R6; 3	ORA; R7	ORA; R8	ORA; R9	WIN; R10	WIN; R11	WIN; R12	MAL; R13; 4	MAL; R14; 5	MAL; R15; 4				13th	287
2003	Steven Ellery Racing	30	Ford AU Falcon	WAK; R1; 7	WAK; R2; 3	WAK; R3; 5	ADE; R4; 20	EAS; R5; 2	EAS; R6; 4	EAS; R7; 7	PHI; R8; 23	PHI; R9; 1	PHI; R10; 2	WIN; R11; 4	WIN; R12; 13	WIN; R13; 6	MAL; R14; 19	MAL; R15; Ret	MAL; R16; 10			5th	688
2004	Steven Ellery Racing	30	Ford AU Falcon	WAK; R1; 6	WAK; R2; 3	WAK; R3; 7	ADE; R4; 5	ADE; R5; 6	WIN; R6; 2	WIN; R7; 16	WIN; R8; 1	EAS; R9; 4	EAS; R10; 7	EAS; R11; 3	QLD; R12; 6	QLD; R13; Ret	QLD; R14; 5	MAL; R15; 3	MAL; R16; 6	MAL; R17; 3		2nd	945
2006	Dick Johnson Racing	81	Ford BA Falcon	ADE; R1	ADE; R2	WAK; R3; 2	WAK; R4; 5	WAK; R5; 4	QLD; R6	QLD; R7	QLD; R8											22nd	703
2006	Peters Motorsport	40	Ford AU Falcon									ORA; R9; 10	ORA; R10; Ret	ORA; R11; 17	MAL; R12; 27	MAL; R13; 2	MAL; R14; Ret	BAT; R15; 9	BAT; R16; 24	PHI; R17	PHI; R18	22nd	703
2007	HPM Racing	76	Ford AU Falcon	ADE; R1; Ret	ADE; R2; DNS	WAK; R3; 20	WAK; R4; 19	WAK; R5; Ret	WIN; R6; 7	WIN; R7; 1	**WIN**; **R8**; 14											5th	198
2007	HPM Racing	76	Ford BA Falcon									QLD; R9; 4	QLD; R10; 3	QLD; R11; 10	ORA; R12; 5	ORA; R13; 4	ORA; R14; 15	BAT; R15; 1	**BAT**; **R16**; 1			5th	198
2007	A.N.T. Racing	30	Ford BA Falcon																	PHI; R17; 6	PHI; R18; 20	5th	198
2008	Peters Motorsport	32	Ford BA Falcon	ADE; R1	ADE; R2	WAK; R3	WAK; R4	WAK; R5	SAN; R6	SAN; R7	SAN; R8	QLD; R9	QLD; R10	QLD; R11	WIN; R12	WIN; R13	WIN; R14	BAT; R15; 19	BAT; R16; 11	ORA; R17; 15	ORA; R18; 13	29th	246
2010	MW Motorsport	26	Ford BF Falcon	ADE; R1	ADE; R2	QLD; R3	QLD; R4	QLD; R5	WIN; R6	WIN; R7	WIN; R8	TOW; R9; Ret	TOW; R10; 18	TOW; R11; 5	BAT; R12	BAT; R13	SAN; R14	SAN; R15	SAN; R16	SYD; R17	SYD; R18	40th	109
2011	Miles Racing	10	Ford BF Falcon	ADE; R1	ADE; R2	BAR; R3	BAR; R4	TOW; R5	TOW; R6	TOW; R7	QLD; R8	QLD; R9	QLD; R10	BAT; R11	BAT; R12	SAN; R13; 11	SAN; R14; 4	SAN; R15; 16	SYD; R16	SYD; R17		32nd	151
2012	MW Motorsport	28	Ford BF Falcon	ADE; R1; 6	ADE; R2; 4	BAR; R3; 5	BAR; R4; 3	BAR; R5; 4	TOW; R6; 6	TOW; R7; 8	TOW; R8; 20	QLD; R9; 6	QLD; R10; Ret	QLD; R11; 7	BAT; R12; 5	BAT; R13; 4						5th	1415
2012	MW Motorsport	28	Ford FG Falcon														WIN; R14; 3	WIN; R15; 3	WIN; R16; 7	SYD; R17; 8	SYD; R18; 8	5th	1415
2013	Brad Jones Racing	41	Holden VE Commodore	ADE; R1	ADE; R2	BAR; R3	BAR; R4	BAR; R5	TOW; R6	TOW; R7	TOW; R8	QLD; R9	QLD; R10	QLD; R11	WIN; R12; 10	**WIN**; **R13**; 3	WIN; R14; 6	BAT; R15	BAT; R16	SYD; R17	SYD; R18	34th	196

=== Supercars Championship results ===
(key) (Races in bold indicate pole position) (Races in italics indicate fastest lap)

Supercars results
Year	Team	No.	Car	1	2	3	4	5	6	7	8	9	10	11	12	13	14	15	16	17	18	19	20	21	22	23	24	25	26	27	28	29	30	31	32	33	34	35	36	37	38	39	40	Position	Points
2000	Perkins Motorsport	8	Holden VX Commodore	PHI; R1	PHI; R2	BAR; R3	BAR; R4	BAR; R5	ADE; R6	ADE; R7	EAS; R8	EAS; R9	EAS; R10	HID; R11	HID; R12	HID; R13	CAN; R14	CAN; R15	CAN; R16	QLD; R17	QLD; R18	QLD; R19	WIN; R20	WIN; R21	WIN; R22	ORA; R23	ORA; R24	ORA; R25	CAL; R26	CAL; R27	CAL; R28	QLD; R29	SAN; R30	SAN; R31	SAN; R32	BAT; R33; Ret								NC	0
2001	Perkins Motorsport	8	Holden VX Commodore	PHI; R1	PHI; R2	ADE; R3	ADE; R4	EAS; R5	EAS; R6	HDV; R7	HDV; R8	HDV; R9	CAN; R10	CAN; R11	CAN; R12	BAR; R13	BAR; R14	BAR; R15	CAL; R16	CAL; R17	CAL; R18	ORA; R19	ORA; R20	QLD; R21; Ret	WIN; R22	WIN; R23	BAT; R24; Ret	PUK; R25	PUK; R26	PUK; R27	SAN; R28	SAN; R29	SAN; R30											63rd	160
2002	Steven Ellery Racing	31	Ford AU Falcon	ADE; R1	ADE; R2	PHI; R3	PHI; R4	EAS; R5	EAS; R6	EAS; R7	HDV; R8	HDV; R9	HDV; R10	CAN; R11	CAN; R12	CAN; R13	BAR; R14	BAR; R15	BAR; R16	ORA; R17	ORA; R18	WIN; R19	WIN; R20	QLD; R21; 23	BAT; R22; 18	SUR; R23	SUR; R24	PUK; R25	PUK; R26	PUK; R27	SAN; R28	SAN; R29												40th	100
2003	Steven Ellery Racing	31	Ford BA Falcon	ADE; R1	ADE; R1	PHI; R3	EAS; R4	WIN; R5	BAR; R6	BAR; R7	BAR; R8	HDV; R9	HDV; R10	HDV; R11	QLD; R12	ORA; R13	SAN; R14; 2	BAT; R15; 3	SUR; R16	SUR; R17	PUK; R18	PUK; R19	PUK; R20	EAS; R21	EAS; R22																			35th	188
2004	Steven Ellery Racing	31	Ford BA Falcon	ADE; R1	ADE; R2	EAS; R3	PUK; R4	PUK; R5	PUK; R6	HDV; R7	HDV; R8	HDV; R9	BAR; R10	BAR; R11	BAR; R12	QLD; R13	WIN; R14	ORA; R15	ORA; R16	SAN; R17; 22	BAT; R18; 16	SUR; R19	SUR; R20	SYM; R21	SYM; R22	SYM; R23	EAS; R24	EAS; R25	EAS; R26															40th	240
2005	Stone Brothers Racing	9	Ford BA Falcon	ADE; R1	ADE; R2	PUK; R3	PUK; R4	PUK; R5	BAR; R6	BAR; R7	BAR; R8	EAS; R9	EAS; R10	SHA; R11	SHA; R12	SHA; R13	HDV; R14	HDV; R15	HDV; R16	QLD; R17	ORA; R18	ORA; R19	SAN; R20; 7	BAT; R21; 5	SUR; R22	SUR; R23	SUR; R24	SYM; R25	SYM; R26	SYM; R27	PHI; R28	PHI; R29	PHI; R30											40th	176
2006	Stone Brothers Racing	1	Ford BA Falcon	ADE; R1	ADE; R2	PUK; R3	PUK; R4	PUK; R5	BAR; R6	BAR; R7	BAR; R8	WIN; R9	WIN; R10	WIN; R11	HDV; R12	HDV; R13	HDV; R14	QLD; R15	QLD; R16	QLD; R17	ORA; R18	ORA; R19	ORA; R20	SAN; R21; 27	BAT; R22; 4	SUR; R23	SUR; R24	SUR; R25	SYM; R26	SYM; R27	SYM; R28	BHR; R29	BHR; R30	BHR; R31	PHI; R32	PHI; R33	PHI; R34							37th	290
2007	Stone Brothers Racing	9	Ford BF Falcon	ADE; R1	ADE; R2	BAR; R3	BAR; R4	BAR; R5	PUK; R6	PUK; R7	PUK; R8	WIN; R9	WIN; R10	WIN; R11	EAS; R12	EAS; R13	EAS; R14	HDV; R15	HDV; R16	HDV; R17	QLD; R18	QLD; R19	QLD; R20	ORA; R21	ORA; R22	ORA; R23	SAN; R24; 7	BAT; R25; Ret	SUR; R26	SUR; R27	SUR; R28	BHR; R29	BHR; R30	BHR; R31	SYM; R32	SYM; R33	SYM; R34	PHI; R35	PHI; R36	PHI; R37				35th	33
2008	Ford Performance Racing	5	Ford BF Falcon	ADE; R1	ADE; R2	EAS; R3	EAS; R4	EAS; R5	HAM; R6	HAM; R7	HAM; R8	BAR; R9	BAR; R10	BAR; R11	SAN; R12	SAN; R13	SAN; R14	HDV; R15	HDV; R16	HDV; R17	QLD; R18	QLD; R19	QLD; R20	WIN; R21	WIN; R22	WIN; R23	PHI; R24; 24	BAT; R25; 7	SUR; R26	SUR; R27	SUR; R28	BHR; R29	BHR; R30	BHR; R31	SYM; R32	SYM; R33	SYM; R34	ORA; R35	ORA; R36	ORA; R37				38th	252
2009	Ford Performance Racing	5	Ford FG Falcon	ADE; R1	ADE; R2	HAM; R3	HAM; R4	WIN; R5	WIN; R6	SYM; R7	SYM; R8	HDV; R9	HDV; R10	TOW; R11	TOW; R12	SAN; R13	SAN; R14	QLD; R15	QLD; R16	PHI; Q 25	PHI; R17; 9	BAT; R18; Ret	SUR; R19	SUR; R20	SUR; R21	SUR; R22	PHI; R23	PHI; R24	BAR; R25	BAR; R26	SYD; R27	SYD; R28												52nd	152
2010	Ford Performance Racing	5	Ford FG Falcon	YMC; R1	YMC; R2	BHR; R3	BHR; R4	ADE; R5	ADE; R6	HAM; R7	HAM; R8	QLD; R9	QLD; R10	WIN; R11	WIN; R12	HDV; R13	HDV; R14	TOW; R15	TOW; R16	PHI; R17; 2	BAT; R18; 9	SUR; R19; 21	SUR; R20; 3	SYM; R21	SYM; R22	SAN; R23	SAN; R24	SYD; R25	SYD; R26															32nd	578
2011	Ford Performance Racing	6	Ford FG Falcon	YMC; R1	YMC; R2	ADE; R3	ADE; R4	HAM; R5	HAM; R6	BAR; R7	BAR; R8	BAR; R9	WIN; R10	WIN; R11	HID; R12	HID; R13	TOW; R14	TOW; R15	QLD; R16	QLD; R17	QLD; R18	**PHI**; **R19**; **3**	BAT; R20; 18	SUR; R21	SUR; R22	SYM; R23	SYM; R24	SAN; R25	SAN; R26	SYD; R27	SYD; R28													37th	344
2012	Stone Brothers Racing	9	Ford FG Falcon	ADE; R1	ADE; R2	SYM; R3	SYM; R4	HAM; R5	HAM; R6	BAR; R7	BAR; R8	BAR; R9	PHI; R10	PHI; R11	HID; R12	HID; R13	TOW; R14	TOW; R15	QLD; R16	QLD; R17	SMP; R18	SMP; R19	SAN; QR; 1	**SAN**; **R20**; **5**	BAT; R21; 12	SUR; R22	SUR; R23	YMC; R24	YMC; R25	YMC; R26	WIN; R27	WIN; R28	SYD; R29	SYD; R30										36th	386
2013	Brad Jones Racing	14	Holden VF Commodore	ADE; R1	ADE; R2	SYM; R3	SYM; R4	SYM; R5	PUK; R6	PUK; R7	PUK; R8	PUK; R9	BAR; R10	BAR; R11	BAR; R12	COA; R13	COA; R14	COA; R15	COA; R16	HID; R17	HID; R18	HID; R19	TOW; R20	TOW; R21	QLD; R22	QLD; R23	QLD; R24	WIN; R25	WIN; R26	WIN; R27	SAN; R28; 7	BAT; R29; 16	SUR; R30; Ret	SUR; R31; 2	PHI; R32	PHI; R33	PHI; R34	SYD; R35	SYD; R36					38th	444
2014	Brad Jones Racing	14	Holden VF Commodore	ADE; R1	ADE; R2	ADE; R3	SYM; R4	SYM; R5	SYM; R6	WIN; R7	WIN; R8	WIN; R9	PUK; R10	PUK; R11	PUK; R12	PUK; R13	BAR; R14	BAR; R15	BAR; R16	HID; R17	HID; R18	HID; R19	TOW; R20	TOW; R21	TOW; R22	QLD; R23	QLD; R24	QLD; R25	SMP; R26	SMP; R27	SMP; R28	SAN; Q 11	SAN; R29; 11	BAT; R30; 9	SUR; R31; 10	SUR; R32; 7	PHI; R33	PHI; R34	PHI; R35	SYD; R36	SYD; R37	SYD; R38		32nd	486
2015	Brad Jones Racing	14	Holden VF Commodore	ADE; R1	ADE; R2	ADE; R3	SYM; R4	SYM; R5	SYM; R6	BAR; R7	BAR; R8	BAR; R9	WIN; R10	WIN; R11	WIN; R12	HID; R13	HID; R14	HID; R15	TOW; R16	TOW; R17	QLD; R18	QLD; R19	QLD; R20	SMP; R21	SMP; R22	SMP; R23	SAN; Q 9	SAN; R24; 16	BAT; R25; 4	SUR; R26; 7	SUR; R27; 13	PUK; R28	PUK; R29	PUK; R30	PHI; R31	PHI; R32	PHI; R33	SYD; R34	SYD; R35	SYD; R36				33rd	516
2016	DJR Team Penske	12	Ford FG X Falcon	ADE; R1	ADE; R2	ADE; R3	SYM; R4	SYM; R5	PHI; R6	PHI; R7	BAR; R8	BAR; R9	WIN; R10	WIN; R11	HID; R12	HID; R13	TOW; R14	TOW; R15	QLD; R16	QLD; R17	SMP; R18	SMP; R19	SAN; Q 5	SAN; R20; 6	BAT; R21; 6	SUR; R22; Ret	SUR; R23; 15	PUK; R24	PUK; R25	PUK; R26	PUK; R27	SYD; R28	SYD; R29											34th	468
2017	Erebus Motorsport	9	Holden VF Commodore	ADE; R1	ADE; R2	SYM; R3	SYM; R4	PHI; R5	PHI; R6	BAR; R7	BAR; R8	WIN; R9	WIN; R10	HID; R11	HID; R12	TOW; R13	TOW; R14	QLD; R15	QLD; R16	SMP; R17	SMP; R18	SAN; QR; 3	SAN; R19; 17	BAT; R20; 1	SUR; R21; 17	SUR; R22; Ret	PUK; R23	PUK; R24	NEW; R25	NEW; R26														38th	462
2018	Erebus Motorsport	9	Holden ZB Commodore	ADE; R1	ADE; R2	MEL; R3	MEL; R4	MEL; R5	MEL; R6	SYM; R7	SYM; R8	PHI; R9	PHI; R10	BAR; R11	BAR; R12	WIN; R13; PO	WIN; R14; PO	HID; R15	HID; R16	TOW; R17	TOW; R18	QLD; R19; PO	QLD; R20; PO	SMP; R21	BEN; R22	BEN; R23	SAN; QR; 1	**SAN**; **R24**; **5**	**BAT**; **R25**; **13**	SUR; R26; 4	**SUR**; **R27**; **C**	PUK; R28	PUK; R29	NEW; R30	NEW; R31									34th	474
2019	Erebus Motorsport	9	Holden ZB Commodore	ADE; R1	ADE; R2	MEL; R3	MEL; R4	MEL; R5	MEL; R6	SYM; R7; PO	SYM; R8; PO	PHI; R9	PHI; R10	BAR; R11	BAR; R12	WIN; R13	WIN; R14	HID; R15	HID; R16	TOW; R17	TOW; R18	QLD; R19	QLD; R20	BEN; R21; PO	BEN; R22; PO	PUK; R23	PUK; R24	BAT; R25; 5	SUR; R26; 22	SUR; R27; 3	SAN; QR; 7	SAN; R28; Ret	NEW; R29	NEW; R30										38th	422
2021	Kelly Grove Racing	26	Ford Mustang S550	BAT1; R1	BAT1; R2	SAN; R3	SAN; R4	SAN; R5	SYM; R6	SYM; R7	SYM; R8	BEN; R9	BEN; R10	BEN; R11	HID; R12	HID; R13	HID; R14	TOW1; R15	TOW1; R16	TOW2; R17	TOW2; R18	TOW2; R19	SMP1; R20	SMP1; R21	SMP1; R22	SMP2; R23; 24	SMP2; R24; 17	SMP2; R25; 11	SMP3; R26; 20	SMP3; R27; 23	SMP3; R28; 23	SMP4; R29	SMP4; R30	BAT2; R31; 11										27th	328

=== Complete Bathurst 1000 results ===
Year	Team	Car	Co-driver	Position	Laps
2000	Perkins Engineering	Holden Commodore (VT)	(Singapore) Christian Murchison	DNF	128
2001	Perkins Engineering	Holden Commodore (VX)	(Australia) Adam Macrow	DNF	85
2002	Supercheap Auto Racing	Ford Falcon (AU)	(Australia) Steven Ellery	9th	160
2003	Supercheap Auto Racing	Ford Falcon (BA)	(Australia) Steven Ellery	**3rd**	161
2004	Supercheap Auto Racing	Ford Falcon (BA)	(Australia) Steven Ellery	16th	158
2005	Stone Brothers Racing	Ford Falcon (BA)	(Australia) Russell Ingall	5th	161
2006	Stone Brothers Racing	Ford Falcon (BA)	(Australia) Russell Ingall	4th	161
2007	Stone Brothers Racing	Ford Falcon (BF)	(Australia) Russell Ingall	DNF	149
2008	Ford Performance Racing	Ford Falcon (BF)	(Australia) Dean Canto	7th	161
2009	Ford Performance Racing	Ford Falcon (FG)	(Australia) Dean Canto	DNF	139
2010	Ford Performance Racing	Ford Falcon (FG)	(Australia) Mark Winterbottom	9th	161
2011	Ford Performance Racing	Ford Falcon (FG)	(Australia) Will Davison	18th	161
2012	Stone Brothers Racing	Ford Falcon (FG)	(New Zealand) Shane van Gisbergen	12th	161
2013	Brad Jones Racing	Holden Commodore (VF)	(New Zealand) Fabian Coulthard	16th	161
2014	Brad Jones Racing	Holden Commodore (VF)	(New Zealand) Fabian Coulthard	9th	161
2015	Brad Jones Racing	Holden Commodore (VF)	(New Zealand) Fabian Coulthard	4th	161
2016	DJR Team Penske	Ford FG X Falcon	(New Zealand) Fabian Coulthard	6th	161
2017	Erebus Motorsport	Holden Commodore (VF)	(Australia) David Reynolds	**1st**	161
2018	Erebus Motorsport	Holden Commodore (ZB)	(Australia) David Reynolds	13th	161
2019	Erebus Motorsport	Holden Commodore ZB	(Australia) David Reynolds	5th	161
2021	Kelly Grove Racing	Ford Mustang Mk.6	(Australia) David Reynolds	11th	161

=== Complete Bathurst 24 Hour results ===
Year	Team	Co-drivers	Car	Class	Laps	Overall position	Class position
2003	(Australia) Mark Coffey Racing	(Australia) Paul Stokell (Denmark) Allan Simonsen (Australia) Peter Hackett	Lamborghini Diablo GTR	A	487	8th	6th

Sporting positions
Preceded by Will Davison; Jonathon Webb	Winner of the Bathurst 1000; 2017 (with David Reynolds)	Succeeded by Craig Lowndes; Steven Richards
