= Ryan Briscoe =

Australian racecar driver (born 1981)

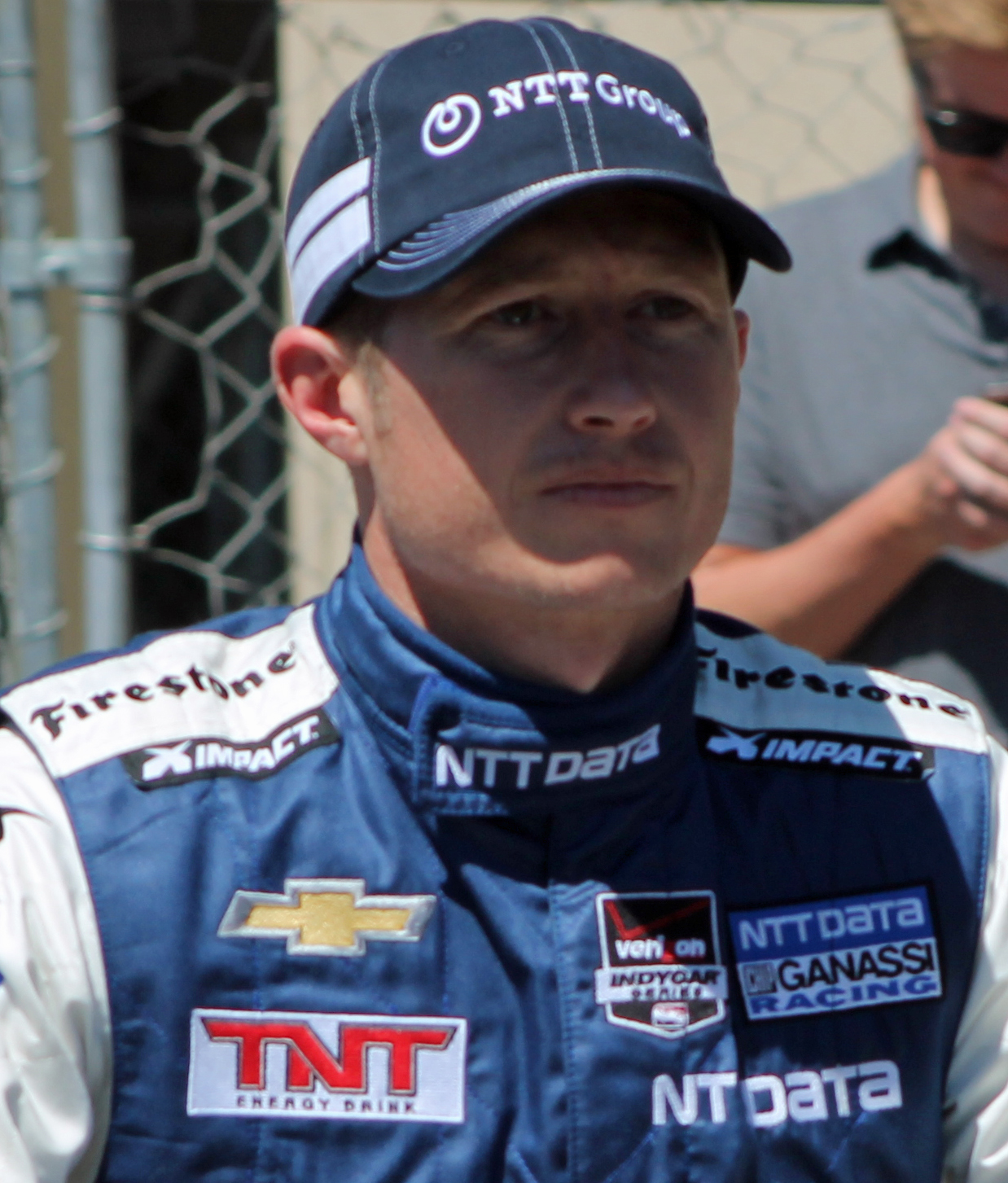
- Briscoe at Sonoma Raceway in August 2014
- Nationality: (Australia) Australian (United States) American (naturalised 2018)
- Born: Ryan John Briscoe; 24 September 1981 (age 45) Sydney, Australia

IndyCar Series career
- Categorisation: FIA Platinum
- Years active: 2005–2015
- Former teams: Dreyer & Reinbold Racing (2006); Luczo-Dragon Racing (2007); Team Penske (2008–2012); Ganassi Racing (2005, 2013–2014); Schmidt Peterson Motorsports (2015)
- Starts: 131
- Wins: 8
- Poles: 13
- Fastest laps: 10
- Best finish: 3rd in 2009

American Le Mans Series
- Years active: 2007, 2008, 2013
- Teams: Penske; Level 5 Motorsports
- Car number: 551
- Starts: 22
- Wins: 8 (6 class, 2 outright)
- Poles: 0
- Fastest laps: 2
- Best finish: 3rd (LMP2) in 2007

Previous series
- 2001 2002 2003 2006: Italian Formula Renault; Formula 3000 and German F3; Formula Three Euroseries; Champ Car World Series

Championship titles
- 2001 2003: Italian Formula Renault; Formula Three Euroseries

Ryan John Briscoe (born 24 September 1981) is an Australian-American professional racing driver from Sydney who has predominantly raced open-wheel and sports cars in Europe and America.

In IndyCar, Briscoe collected eight wins and 28 podiums, finishing third in the 2009 season, fifth in 2008 and 2010, and sixth in 2011 and 2012. In sports car racing, he has won the 2020 24 Hours of Daytona and the 2020 Petit Le Mans, was runner-up at the 2007 American Le Mans Series LMP2 class, and won the 2013 12 Hours of Sebring LMP2 class, the 2008 and 2013 Petit Le Mans LMP2 class, the 2015 24 Hours of Daytona GTLM class, and finished third overall at the 2008 24 Hours of Daytona.

== Career biography ==
=== Early career ===
Like many racing drivers, Briscoe started his career in karting, first racing in 1993. After winning Australian, North American and Italian championships, he moved to Formula Renault in 2000. He won the Italian Formula Renault Championship in 2001 (winning five races) and finished fourth running a limited schedule in the Eurocup (with two wins in six races).

=== 2002–04: Toyota F1 test driver ===
In 2002, Briscoe became test driver for the Toyota Formula One team which made its debut that season. He started that year racing in the Formula 3000 series, but struggled and left his ride after seven races. He finished the year in the German Formula Three Championship, taking three podiums in the last six rounds. He also won the Formula Three Euroseries in 2003 (winning eight races in the process). He became the Toyota F1 team's 'third' driver (i.e., drove the team's test car on Fridays at Grands Prix) for the last third of the 2004 season, after previous third driver Ricardo Zonta was called up to replace Cristiano da Matta.

=== 2005: Move to IndyCar with Ganassi ===
There were rumours that Briscoe was set to race for the Jordan Grand Prix F1 team in 2005, due to the team's acquisition of Toyota power. Instead, Briscoe moved to America and raced for Target Chip Ganassi Racing in the IndyCar Series, including a tenth-place finish in the Indianapolis 500. He also made his Rolex Grand-Am début with Ganassi at the 24 Hours of Daytona.

In the 2005 IndyCar Series, Briscoe took pole position at Sears Point, but struggled on the ovals and was involved in several crashes. On 11 September 2005, he was involved in a violent crash at Chicagoland Speedway, breaking both clavicles among other injuries. His car climbed on top of the Cheever Racing entry driven by Alex Barron and went airborne into the catch fencing above the retaining wall and snapping in two. He was released from hospital on 19 September and following some initial treatment in the US, moved to the specialist Formula Medicine facility in Viareggio, Italy, for the bulk of his rehabilitation. It took eight weeks for Briscoe to recover from the injuries he sustained in the crash. His official web site announced his return to the USA on 14 November 2005.

=== 2006–07: Limited campaigns ===
Briscoe was dropped by Ganassi for 2006, replaced by 2005 IndyCar champion Dan Wheldon. During the winter, he tested with fellow Australian and Champ Car owner Kevin Kalkhoven's PKV Racing team. Briscoe also tested for the Conquest Racing team. Briscoe competed in the 2006 24 Hours of Daytona with 2005 champions Wayne Taylor, Max Angelelli and Emmanuel Collard, but the team withdrew due to accident damage before Briscoe's turn to drive.

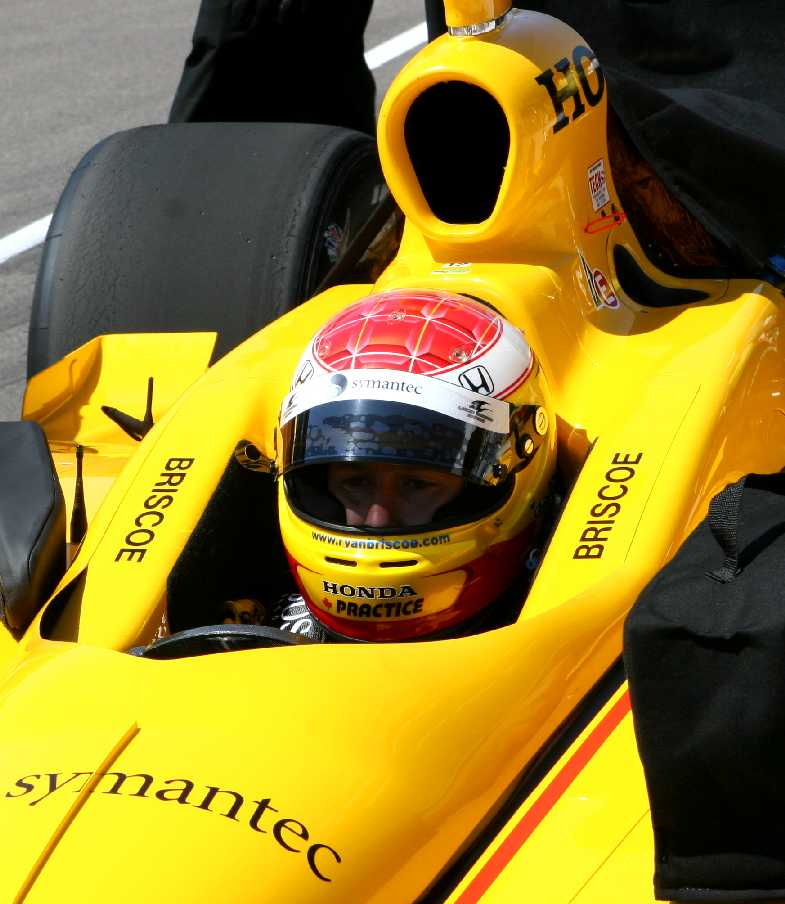
Ryan Briscoe waits for a qualification attempt at Indy in 2007

In 2006, Briscoe was announced as an endurance driver for Holden Racing Team in the Australian V8 Supercars touring car series. He partnered Jim Richards at the Sandown 500 and Bathurst 1000, with Richards crashing the car before Briscoe could drive a race lap at Bathurst. Briscoe also drove in the A1 Grand Prix race at Laguna Seca in the US for A1 Team Australia, scoring three points.

At the Indy 500, Briscoe was a surprise late driver of the No. 48 car for A. J. Foyt Racing – the deal was so late he was still having his seat fitting with less than half an hour of Bump Day qualifying left, and he never got out on the track to attempt a qualifying run. He returned to the IRL the following week and drove the No. 5 Dreyer & Reinbold Racing Dallara to a third-place finish at Watkins Glen International, a road course. He returned to the Dreyer & Reinbold team on a three race deal for the short speedways in the second half of the season, but recorded DNF's in two of his three races with the team. He then was tabbed to replace the injured Cristiano da Matta in the final two races of the Champ Car season for the RuSPORT team, including his home country's race at Surfers Paradise.

Briscoe signed a deal to drive for Penske Racing's Porsche RS Spyder LMP2 car in the American Le Mans Series. He took three wins in a full campaign driving with Sascha Maassen. Briscoe continued to drive the RS Spyder in a limited campaign in 2008. He scored his only class victory that year at Petit Le Mans, winning with fellow IndyCar driver Hélio Castroneves.

Briscoe's ties to Penske were also strengthened in 2007 when he was on loan to drive in the Indy 500 in a car owned by Stephen J. Luczo and Jay Penske, with equipment leased from defending '500' champion Penske Racing. Driving the No. 12 Symantec Luczo-Dragon Racing machine, Briscoe qualified seventh with a four lap average speed of 224.410. In the race on 28 May 2007, he completed all 166 laps before the race was called due to inclement weather. Briscoe finished fifth among the 33 participants earning him $302,305 and thirty driver points.

=== 2008–2012: Penske contender for the championship ===
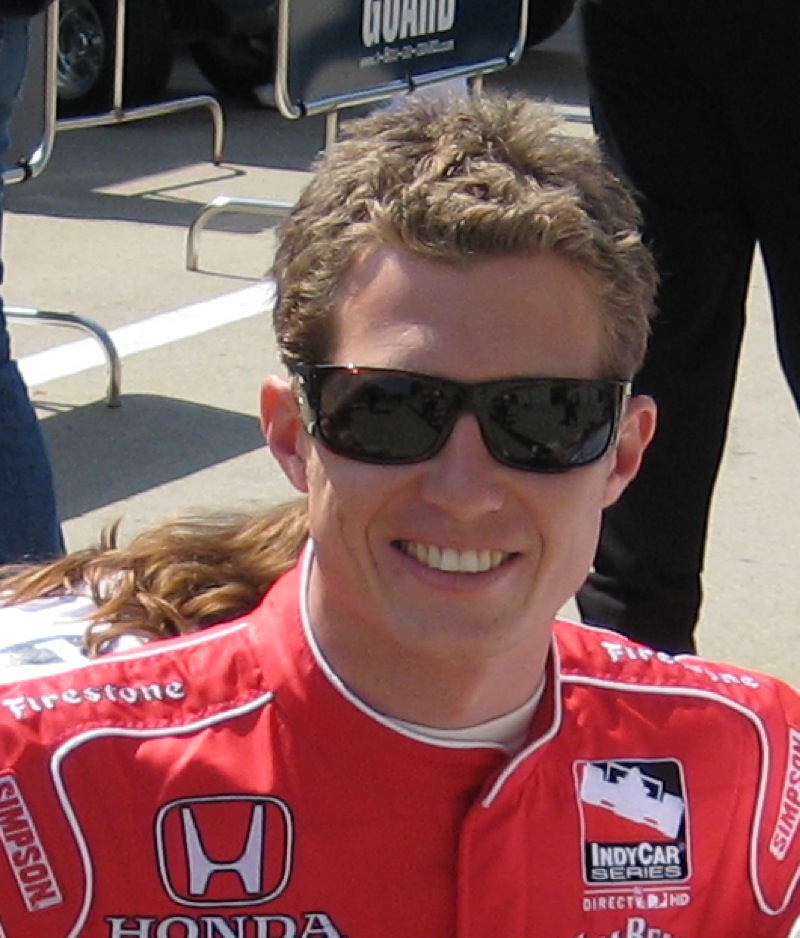
Briscoe at the Indianapolis Motor Speedway in May 2008.

Briscoe signed to drive for Penske's IndyCar team as a full-time race driver for the 2008 IndyCar Series season, replacing Sam Hornish Jr., who started racing full-time in Penske's NASCAR team in 2008. Briscoe knocked himself out of the 2008 Indianapolis 500 along with Danica Patrick when Briscoe came out of the pits and ran into Patrick tearing up her suspension and tearing the front end of Briscoe's car. Patrick and Briscoe were fined $100,000 and placed on probation at the end of the season.

Briscoe earned his first career win at the Milwaukee Mile just one week after Indy, holding off Scott Dixon and avoiding a late crash involving Marco Andretti, Ed Carpenter, and Vítor Meira. Briscoe became the sixth driver in IndyCar history to score his first win while driving for Penske, following Mark Donohue (in 1971), Tom Sneva (1975), Rick Mears (1978), Paul Tracy (1993), and teammate Hélio Castroneves (2000). He followed up his first career win with a second victory, shortly after the halfway point of the season, at the Honda 200 on the Mid-Ohio Sports Car Course.

Briscoe also became the first Australian to claim victory at their home event, the 2008 Nikon Indy 300, on 26 October 2008, after countryman and favourite Will Power crashed out early in the race. The race, however, was not held for championship points and was the last major open-wheel event held at the Surfers Paradise Street Circuit.

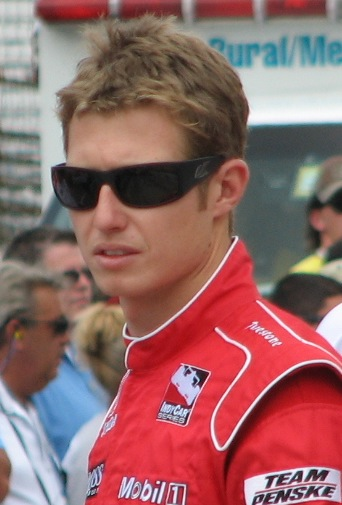
Briscoe at the Indianapolis Motor Speedway in May 2009.

2009 was Briscoe's best season in the championship, with three wins and eight further podiums Briscoe led the championship for most of the season with him trading the lead with Dario Franchitti and Scott Dixon. He was leading the championship by 25 points before the penultimate round, the Indy Japan 300 at the Twin Ring Motegi. Briscoe then hit the wall exiting accelerating from the pit exit and had to retire, dropping to third in the championship behind Dario Franchitti and Dixon. Briscoe remained in championship contention heading into the final event at Homestead-Miami Speedway, however in a three-way battle between the title contenders, Briscoe could only finish second behind Franchitti, who became champion.

Briscoe won a single race at Texas Motor Speedway in 2010, but could not recapture the heights of 2009 and did not win another race until Sonoma Raceway in 2012. Briscoe did, however, take pole for the 2012 Indianapolis 500, becoming the first Australian to do so. Briscoe matched his best finishing position of fifth in the race.

=== 2013–14: ALMS and return to Ganassi ===
At the beginning of 2013, Briscoe was unable to secure an IndyCar ride. Instead, he was hired by Level 5 Motorsports to drive an HPD ARX-03b in the P2 class of the 2013 12 Hours of Sebring. Briscoe won his class with Scott Tucker and Marino Franchitti, his first ALMS P2 class win since 2008. Later, just before the Toyota Grand Prix of Long Beach in April, Level 5 announced it had signed Briscoe on as a full-season P2 driver with Tucker, going on to win six times across the season. With the team Briscoe also made his debut in the 24 Hours of Le Mans but the entry was not classified.

Meanwhile, just before the 2013 Grand Prix of Alabama in April, Chip Ganassi Racing announced they had signed Briscoe to return to the team for the 2013 Indianapolis 500 as a 3rd entry. Following the 500, in which Briscoe finished twelfth, Panther Racing announced that it had signed Briscoe to replace J. R. Hildebrand in the No. 4 National Guard car from Detroit onwards.

Following Dario Franchitti's retirement after a crash at the Grand Prix of Houston, Tony Kanaan moved from a planned fourth Ganassi Racing car, and Briscoe took over the fourth No. 8 NTT Data car from Kanaan for the 2014 IndyCar Series. He finished eleventh in the points and failed to finish on the podium. He parted ways with Ganassi at the end of the season, as the No. 8 car needed more funding to continue.

Having returned to the V8 Supercars Bathurst 1000 in 2010, and competing as a mandated 'international driver' in the Gold Coast 600 between 2010 and 2012, Briscoe returned to Australia in 2013 to compete in the newly launched three-event series of two-driver races known as the Enduro Cup. The final race of this campaign, also at the Gold Coast 600, saw Briscoe take his first championship podium driving with Russell Ingall.

=== 2015: Corvette success and IndyCar substitution ===
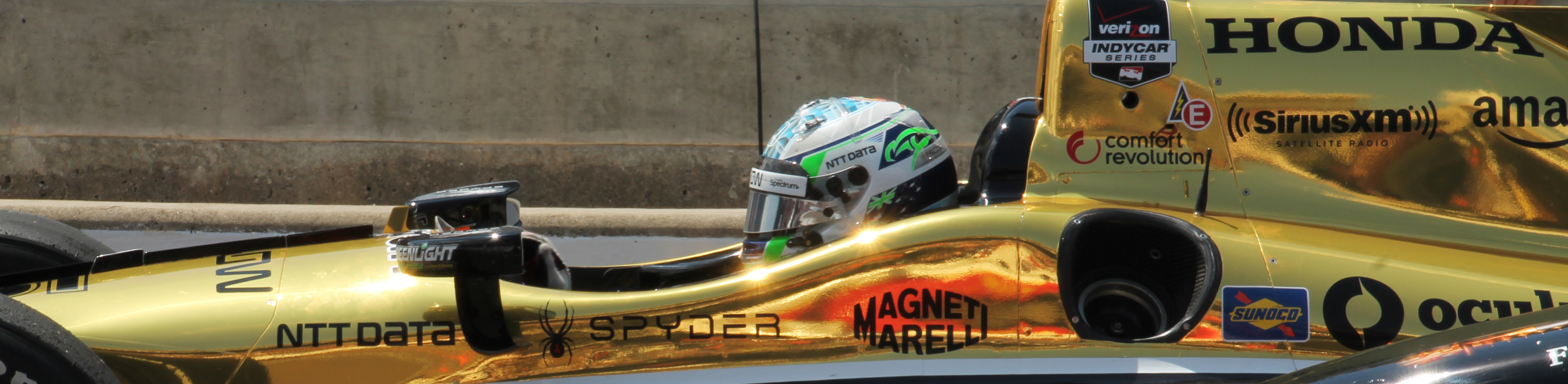
Briscoe driving Hinchcliffe's car during the Pit Stop Challenge on Carb Day during the Indianapolis 500

For the 2015 IndyCar Series season, Briscoe had been in negotiations to race for Schmidt Peterson Motorsports, but that fell through when financial arrangements could not be made for the team to field a third car. However, the team then called Briscoe in as replacement driver for James Hinchcliffe at the 2015 Indianapolis 500 after Hinchcliffe suffered a severe injury after qualifying for the race. He returned to the team at Texas and joined as permanent replacement driver from Fontana onwards. He collected four top-ten finishes in eight races in what were his final appearances in the championship.

Meanwhile, Briscoe continued a relationship with Corvette Racing in the GTLM category that had commenced in 2014 with selected entries as a third driver in the endurance United SportsCar Championship (IMSA) events. In 2015, Briscoe won his class at the 2015 24 Hours of Daytona and 2015 12 Hours of Sebring driving the Chevrolet Corvette C7.R with Antonio García and Jan Magnussen. The team also entered the 2015 24 Hours of Le Mans but failed to make the start after a crash in qualifying.

=== 2016–19: Ford GT with Ganassi ===
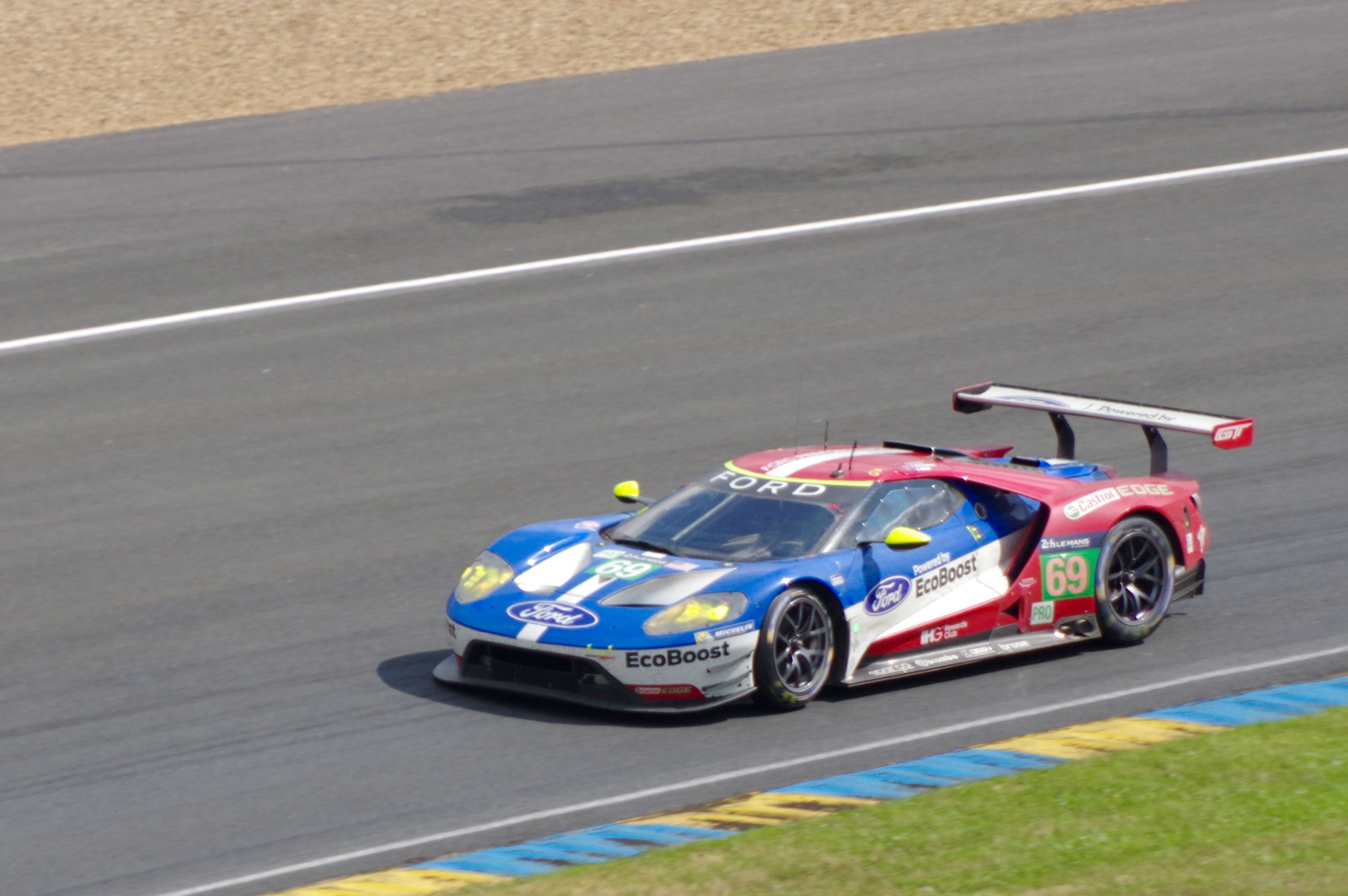
The No. 69 Ford GT belonging to Briscoe, Dixon, and Westbrook that took third in the 2016 24 Hours of Le Mans

In 2016, Ford launched a return to endurance sports car racing with Chip Ganassi Racing running a Ford GT across both the FIA World Endurance (WEC) and WeatherTech SportsCar Championship (IMSA) championships. Briscoe was selected to join the IMSA team which, alongside former IndyCar rival Scott Dixon and Richard Westbrook, also made annual appearances in the WEC's 24 Hours of Le Mans. The trio scored a class podium at the 2016 24 Hours of Le Mans and Briscoe claimed his 2nd 24 Hours of Daytona class win in 2018. In the IMSA championship, Westbrook and Briscoe contested full seasons with Dixon joining them for the endurance races. Westbrook and Briscoe finished second in the championship in both 2016 and 2018. The Ford works programme shut down at the end of the 2019 season.

=== 2020: Wayne Taylor Racing ===
Briscoe switched to the Prototype class for the 2020 IMSA WeatherTech Championship, partnering with Renger van der Zande as full-time driver at Wayne Taylor Racing. The duo won the 2020 24 Hours of Daytona along with Scott Dixon and Kamui Kobayashi. In October 2020, Briscoe, van der Zande and Dixon won the 2020 Petit Le Mans at Road Atlanta.

== Personal life ==
In addition to his native English, Briscoe speaks Italian and French. He attended Trinity Grammar School in Summer Hill, Sydney, Australia, however he had left to compete in Europe before completing his education.

Briscoe has been married to ESPN anchor Nicole Briscoe (née Manske) since 2009 and the couple have two children. In April 2018, he became a naturalized American citizen and thus hold the Australian and American citizenships respectively.

Briscoe is not related to NASCAR driver Chase Briscoe.

== Racing record ==
=== Karting career summary ===
Season	Series	Team	Position
1995	CIK Stars of Karting - Pro Junior KF3	CRG	**1st**
1996	CIK Stars of Karting - Pro Junior KF3	CRG	**1st**
1996	7th Trofeo Andrea Margutti - 100 Junior	CRG	**3rd**
1996	CIK-FIA Junior World Karting Championship	CRG	25th
1997	FIA European Formula A Championship	CRG	7th
1997	FIA World Formula A Championship	CRG	20th
1998	FIA World Formula A Championship	CRG	28th
1998	9th Andrea Margutti Trophy - Formula A	CRG	**3rd**
1999	Italian Open Masters - Formula A	CRG	**1st**
1999	FIA World Formula Super A Championship	CRG	14th
1999	10th Trofeo Andrea Margutti - Formula A	CRG	17th
1999	FIA Karting World Cup - Formula Super A	CRG	16th
2000	FIA World Formula Super A Championship	Tony Kart	19th
2000	FIA European Kart Championship - Formula C	Tony Kart	11th
2000	FIA World Formula C Kart Championship	Tony Kart	31st
2000	FIA European Kart Championship - Formula Super A	Tony Kart	23rd
2000	11th Trofeo Andrea Margutti - Formula A	Tony Kart	33rd

=== Circuit career summary ===
Season	Series	Team	Races	Wins	Poles	F/laps	Podiums	Points	Position
2000	Formula Renault 2000 Italy	Prema Powerteam	1	0	0	0	0	16	17th
2001	Formula Renault 2000 Italy	Prema Powerteam	10	5	3	1	7	226	**1st**
2001	Formula Renault 2000 Eurocup	Prema Powerteam	6	2	1	2	3	102	4th
2001	German Formula 3 Championship	Prema Powerteam	2	0	0	0	0	0	NC†
2001	French Formula 3 Championship	Prema Powerteam	1	0	0	0	1	0	NC†
2001	Masters of Formula 3	Prema Powerteam	1	0	0	0	0	N/A	NC
2002	German Formula 3 Championship	Prema Powerteam	12	0	0	0	3	16	13th
2002	French Formula 3 Championship	Prema Powerteam	2	0	0	0	0	0	NC†
2002	Italian Formula 3 Championship	Prema Powerteam	1	0	0	?	0	0	NC†
2002	Masters of Formula 3	Prema Powerteam	1	0	0	0	0	N/A	NC
2002	International Formula 3000	Nordic Racing	7	0	0	0	0	0	NC
2003	Formula 3 Euro Series	Prema Powerteam	20	8	4	5	10	110	**1st**
2003	FIA European Formula Three Cup	Prema Powerteam	2	0	0	0	0	–	**1st**
2003	British Formula 3 Championship	Prema Powerteam	2	0	0	0	0	0	NC†
2003	Macau Grand Prix	Prema Powerteam	1	0	0	0	0	N/A	7th
2003	Masters of Formula 3	Prema Powerteam	1	0	0	1	1	N/A	**3rd**
2004	Formula One	Panasonic Toyota Racing	Test driver						
2005	IndyCar Series	Target Chip Ganassi Racing	14	0	1	1	0	232	19th
2005	Rolex Sports Car Series	CompUSA Chip Ganassi	1	0	0	0	0	24	68th
2005–06	A1 Grand Prix	A1 Team Australia	4	0	0	0	1	51	13th
2006	IndyCar Series	Dreyer & Reinbold Racing	4	0	0	0	1	83	21st
2006	Champ Car World Series	RuSPORT	2	0	0	0	0	17	21st
2006	Rolex Sports Car Series	SunTrust Racing	2	0	0	0	2	62	61st
2006	V8 Supercar	Holden Racing Team	2	0	0	0	0	120	58th
2006–07	A1 Grand Prix	A1 Team Australia	6	0	0	0	1	25	13th
2007	American Le Mans Series – LMP2	Penske Racing	12	3	1	5	9	186	**3rd**
2007	IndyCar Series	Luczo-Dragon Racing	1	0	0	0	0	30	24th
2008	IndyCar Series	Team Penske	17	2	3	4	5	447	5th
2008	American Le Mans Series – LMP2	Team Penske	4	1	1	1	1	53	10th
2008	Rolex Sports Car Series – DP	Team Penske	1	0	0	0	1	30	46th
2009	IndyCar Series	Penske Racing	17	3	4	5	11	604	**3rd**
2009	Rolex Sports Car Series – DP	Penske Racing	1	0	0	0	0	25	41st
2010	IndyCar Series	Penske Racing	17	1	3	1	3	482	5th
2010	V8 Supercar	Holden Racing Team	3	0	0	0	0	0	NC†
2011	IndyCar Series	Penske Racing	17	0	0	0	4	364	6th
2011	Rolex Sports Car Series – DP	SunTrust Racing	1	0	0	0	0	27	26th
2011	V8 Supercar	Holden Racing Team	2	0	0	0	0	108	72nd
2012	IndyCar Series	Penske Racing	15	1	2	1	3	370	6th
2012	V8 Supercar	Holden Racing Team	2	0	0	0	0	0	NC†
2013	American Le Mans Series– P2	Level 5 Motorsports	8	6	?	?	?	125	5th
2013	IndyCar Series	Chip Ganassi Racing; Panther Racing	7	0	0	0	0	100	26th
2013	V8 Supercar Endurance Cup	Holden Racing Team	4	0	0	0	1	216	7th
2014	IndyCar Series	Chip Ganassi Racing	18	0	0	1	0	461	11th
2015	IndyCar Series	Schmidt Peterson Motorsports	8	0	0	0	0	205	18th
2015	United Sports Car Championship – GTLM	Corvette Racing	3	2	0	0	3	103	11th
2016	IMSA Sports Car Championship – GTLM	Ford Chip Ganassi Racing	11	3	1	1	5	328	**2nd**
2017	IMSA Sports Car Championship – GTLM	Ford Chip Ganassi Racing	11	0	1	0	5	306	4th
2018	IMSA Sports Car Championship – GTLM	Ford Chip Ganassi Racing	11	3	2	1	4	316	**2nd**
2019	IMSA Sports Car Championship – GTLM	Ford Chip Ganassi Racing	11	2	0	1	4	313	4th
2020	IMSA Sports Car Championship – Dpi	Konica Minolta Cadillac	9	2	0	2	5	264	**2nd**
2020	Intercontinental GT Challenge	Vital Speed	1	0	0	0	0	0	NC
2021	FIA World Endurance Championship – Hypercar	Glickenhaus Racing	2	0	0	0	0	38	6th
2021	24 Hours of Le Mans – Hypercar	Glickenhaus Racing	1	0	0	0	0	N/A	5th
2021	IMSA SportsCar Championship – GTD	Scuderia Corsa	2	0	0	1	0	194	68th
2022	FIA World Endurance Championship – Hypercar	Glickenhaus Racing	1	0	0	0	1	23	7th
2022	24 Hours of Le Mans – Hypercar	Glickenhaus Racing	1	0	0	0	1	N/A	**3rd**
2023	FIA World Endurance Championship – Hypercar	Glickenhaus Racing	3	0	0	0	0	24	12th
2023	FIA World Endurance Championship – Hypercar	Floyd Vanwall Racing Team	1	0	0	0	0	24	12th
2023	IMSA SportsCar Championship – GTD	Racers Edge Motorsports with WTR Andretti	1	0	0	0	0	280	51st
2023	24 Hours of Le Mans – Hypercar	Glickenhaus Racing	1	0	0	0	0	N/A	6th

^{†} As Briscoe was a guest driver, he was ineligible for points.

=== Complete International Formula 3000 results ===
(key) (Races in bold indicate pole position) (Races in italics indicate fastest lap)

Year	Entrant	1	2	3	4	5	6	7	8	9	10	11	12	DC	Pts
2002	Coca-Cola Nordic Racing	INT; 12	IMO; 13	CAT; 12	A1R; 17	MON; Ret	NÜR; Ret	SIL; 12	MAG	HOC	HUN	SPA	MNZ	23rd	0

=== Complete Formula 3 Euro Series results ===
(key)

Year	Entrant	Chassis	Engine	1	2	3	4	5	6	7	8	9	10	11	12	13	14	15	16	17	18	19	20	DC	Pts
2003	Prema Powerteam	Dallara F303/008	Spiess-Opel	HOC; 1; 1	HOC; 2; 1	ADR; 1; 5	**ADR**; **2**; 1	**PAU**; **1**; 1	PAU; 2; 2	NOR; 1; 4	NOR; 2 Ret	LMS; 1; 3	LMS; 2 Ret	NÜR; 1 Ret	NÜR; 2; 7	**A1R**; **1**; 1	**A1R**; **2**; 1	ZAN; 1; 17	ZAN; 2; 1	HOC; 1; 17	**HOC**; **2**; 1	MAG; 1; 14	MAG; 2; 14	1st	110

=== Complete Formula One results ===
(key) (Races in bold indicate pole position)

Year	Entrant	Chassis	1	2	3	4	5	6	7	8	9	10	11	12	13	14	15	16	17	18	WDC	Pts
2004	Panasonic Toyota Racing	Toyota TF104	AUS	MAL	BHR	SMR	ESP	MON	EUR	CAN	USA	FRA	GBR	GER	HUN; TD	BEL; TD	ITA; TD				–	–
2004	Panasonic Toyota Racing	Toyota TF104B																CHN; TD	JPN; TD*	BRA; TD	–	–

* Was entered as third driver, but did not run due to bad weather.

=== Complete A1 Grand Prix results ===
(key) (Races in bold indicate pole position) (Races in italics indicate fastest lap)

Year	Entrant	1	2	3	4	5	6	7	8	9	10	11	12	13	14	15	16	17	18	19	20	21	22	DC	Pts
2005–06	Australia	GBR; SPR	GBR; FEA	GER; SPR	GER; FEA	POR; SPR	POR; FEA	AUS; SPR	AUS; FEA	MYS; SPR	MYS; FEA	UAE; SPR	UAE; FEA	RSA; SPR	RSA; FEA	IDN; SPR	IDN; FEA	MEX; SPR	MEX; FEA	USA; SPR; 10	USA; FEA; 8	CHN; SPR; 9	CHN; FEA; 3	13th	51
2006–07	Australia	NED; SPR; 13	NED; FEA; 3	CZE; SPR	CZE; FEA	CHN; SPR	CHN; FEA	MYS; SPR; 12	MYS; FEA; 17	IDN; SPR; 6	IDN; FEA; 10	NZL; SPR	NZL; FEA	AUS; SPR	AUS; FEA	RSA; SPR	RSA; FEA	MEX; SPR	MEX; FEA	CHN; SPR	CHN; FEA	GBR; SPR	GBR; SPR	13th	24

=== IndyCar results ===
(key) (Races in bold indicate pole position)

Year	Team	No.	Chassis	Engine	1	2	3	4	5	6	7	8	9	10	11	12	13	14	15	16	17	18	19	Rank	Points	Ref
2005	Chip Ganassi Racing	33	Panoz	Toyota	HMS; 20	PHX; 19	STP; 14	MOT; 12	INDY; 10	TXS; 12	RIR; 21	KAN; 21	NSH; 8	MIL; DNS	MCH; 10	KTY; 13	PPR; 20	**SNM**; 19	CHI; 22	WGL	FON			19th	232	
2006	Dreyer & Reinbold Racing	5	Dallara	Honda	HMS	STP	MOT	INDY	WGL; 3	TXS	RIR	KAN	NSH; 9	MIL; 18	MCH	KTY	SNM; 16	CHI						21st	83	
2007	Luczo-Dragon Racing	12	Dallara	Honda	HMS	STP	MOT	KAN	INDY; 5	MIL	TXS	IOW	RIR	WGL	NSH	MOH	MCH	KTY	SNM	DET	CHI			24th	30	
2008	Team Penske	6	Dallara	Honda	HMS; 19	STP; 23	MOT^{1} 9	LBH^{1}	KAN; 7	INDY; 23	MIL; 1	TXS; 3	IOW; 7	RIR; 15	**WGL**; 12	NSH; 23	MOH; 1	**EDM**; 6	KTY; 7	SNM; 2	DET; 9	**CHI**; 3	SRF^{2} 1	5th	447	
2009	Penske Racing	6	Dallara	Honda	STP; 1	LBH; 13	KAN; 4	INDY; 15	**MIL**; 2	TXS; 2	IOW; 2	RIR; 19	**WGL**; 2	TOR; 2	EDM; 4	KTY; 1	**MOH**; 2	SNM; 2	**CHI**; 1	MOT; 18	HMS; 2			3rd	604	
2010	Team Penske	6	Dallara	Honda	SAO; 14	STP; 3	ALA; 6	LBH; 8	**KAN**; 6	INDY; 24	**TXS**; 1	IOW; 4	WGL; 2	TOR; 18	EDM; 4	MOH; 6	SNM; 4	**CHI**; 11	KTY; 24	MOT; 4	HMS; 4			5th	482	
2011	Team Penske	6	Dallara	Honda	STP; 18	ALA; 21	LBH; 2	SAO; 3	INDY; 27	TXS; 6	TXS; 3	MIL; 11	IOW; 6	TOR; 7	EDM; 10	MOH; 16	NHM; 8	SNM; 3	BAL; 14	MOT; 20	KTY; 8	LVS^{3} C		6th	364	
2012	Team Penske	2	Dallara DW12	Chevrolet	STP; 5	ALA; 14	**LBH**; 7	SAO; 25	**INDY**; 5	DET; 16	TXS; 3	MIL; 14	IOW; 18	TOR; 19	EDM; 8	MOH; 7	SNM; 1	BAL; 2	FON; 17					6th	370	
2013	Chip Ganassi Racing	8	Dallara DW12	Honda	STP	ALA	LBH	SAO	INDY; 12															26th	100	
2013	Panther Racing	4	Dallara DW12	Chevrolet						DET; 21	DET; 13	TXS	MIL; 15	IOW	POC; 14	TOR; 22	TOR; DNS	MOH	SNM; 17	BAL	HOU	HOU	FON	26th	100	
2014	Chip Ganassi Racing	8	Dallara DW12	Chevrolet	STP; 10	LBH; 17	ALA; 11	IMS; 6	INDY; 18	DET; 15	DET; 10	TXS; 9	HOU; 12	HOU; 8	POC; 4	IOW; 9	TOR; 12	TOR; 11	MOH; 8	MIL; 6	SNM; 17	FON; 7		11th	461	
2015	Schmidt Peterson Motorsports	5	Dallara DW12	Honda	STP	NLA	LBH	ALA	IMS	INDY; 12	DET	DET	TXS; 8	TOR	FON; 15	MIL; 21	IOW; 8	MOH; 18	POC; 8	SNM; 5				18th	205	

^{1} Run on same day.
^{2} Non-points-paying, exhibition race.
^{3} The Las Vegas Indy 300 was abandoned after Dan Wheldon died from injuries sustained in a 15-car crash on lap 11.

Years	Teams	Races	Poles	Wins	Podiums (Non-win)**	Top 10s (Non-podium)***	Indianapolis 500 wins	Championships
11	6	136	13	8	20	38	0	0

** Podium (Non-win) indicates 2nd or 3rd place finishes.
*** Top 10s (Non-podium) indicates 4th through 10th place finishes.

==== Indianapolis 500 ====
Year	Chassis	Engine	Start	Finish	Team
2005	Panoz	Toyota	24	10	Chip Ganassi Racing
2007	Dallara	Honda	7	5	Luczo-Dragon Racing
2008	Dallara	Honda	3	23	Team Penske
2009	Dallara	Honda	2	15	Team Penske
2010	Dallara	Honda	4	24	Team Penske
2011	Dallara	Honda	26	27	Team Penske
2012	Dallara	Chevrolet	**1**	5	Team Penske
2013	Dallara	Honda	23	12	Chip Ganassi Racing
2014	Dallara	Chevrolet	8	18	Chip Ganassi Racing
2015	Dallara	Honda	33	12	Schmidt Peterson Motorsports

=== Champ Car results ===
Year	Team	No.	Chassis	Engine	1	2	3	4	5	6	7	8	9	10	11	12	13	14	Rank	Points	Ref
2006	RuSPORT	10	Lola B02/00	Ford XFE	LBH	HOU	MTY	MIL	POR	CLE	TOR	EDM	SJO	DEN	MTL	ROA	SRF; 11	MXC; 14	**21st**	**17**	

=== Rolex Sports Car Series results ===
(key) (Races in bold indicate pole position) (Races in italics indicate fastest lap)

Rolex Sports Car Series results
Year	Entrant	Class	Car	Engine	1	2	3	4	5	6	7	8	9	10	11	12	13	14	15	Pos.	Pts
2005	Ganassi Racing	DP	Riley	Lexus	DAY; 7	HOM	CAL	LAG	MTT	WGL	BAR	WGL	DAY	MOH	PHX	WGL	VIR	MEX		68th	24
2006	SunTrust Racing	DP	Riley	Pontiac	DAY; 29	MEX	HOM	LBH	VIR	LAG	PHX	LIM	WGL; 3	DAY	BAR	WGL; 2	SON	MMP		61st	62
2008	Penske-Taylor Racing	DP	Riley	Pontiac	DAY; 3	HOM	MEX	VIR	LAG	LIM	WGL	MOH	DAY	BAR	CGV	WGL	SON	NJE	MMP	46th	30
2009	Penske Racing	DP	Riley	Porsche	DAY; 6	VIR	NJE	LAG	WGL	MOH	DAY	BAR	WGL	CGV	MMP	HOM				41st	25
2011	SunTrust Racing	DP	Dallara	Chevrolet	DAY; 5	HOM	BAR	VIR	LIM	LAG	WGL	MOH	DAY	NJE	WGL	CGV	MMP			26th	27
2012	SunTrust Racing	DP	Corvette DP	Chevrolet	DAY; 14	BAR	HOM	NJE	DET	MOH	ROA	WGL	IMS	WGL	CGV	LAG	LIM			NC	0

=== American Le Mans Series results ===
(key) (Races in bold indicate pole position) (Races in italics indicate fastest lap)

Year	Entrant	Class	Car	Engine	1	2	3	4	5	6	7	8	9	10	11	12	Pos.	Pts
2007	Penske Racing	LMP2	Porsche RS Spyder	Porsche MR6 3.4 L V8	SEB; 8	STP; 1	LBH; 2	HOU; 3	MMP; 1	LIM; 1	MOH; 2	ROA; 2	MOS; 2	**DET**; 7	PET; 5	**LAG**; 2	3rd	186
2008	Penske Racing	LMP2	Porsche RS Spyder Evo	Porsche MR6 3.4 L V8	SEB; 8	STP	LBH	MMP	LIM	MOH	ROA	MOS	DET; 5	**PET**; 1	LAG; 4		16th	53
2013	Level 5 Motorsports	LMP2	HPD ARX-03b	Honda HR28TT 2.8 L Turbo V6	**SEB**; 1	**LBH**; 3	**LAG**; 1	**LIM**; 1	MOS	ROA	**BAL**; 4	COA; 1	**VIR**; 1	PET; 1			5th	129

=== Complete IMSA SportsCar Championship results ===
(key) (Races in bold indicate pole position) (Races in italics indicate fastest lap)

Year	Team	Class	Make	Engine	1	2	3	4	5	6	7	8	9	10	11	12	Pos.	Points
2014	Corvette Racing	GTLM	Chevrolet Corvette C7.R	Chevrolet LT5.5R 5.5 L V8	DAY; 10	SEB; 8	LBH	LGA	WGL	MOS	IMS	ROA	VIR	COA	PET; 4		25th	99
2015	Corvette Racing	GTLM	Chevrolet Corvette C7.R	Chevrolet LT5.5R 5.5 L V8	DAY; 1	SEB; 1	LBH	LGA	WGL	MOS	ELK	VIR	COA	PET; 3			11th	103
2016	Ford Chip Ganassi Racing	GTLM	Ford GT	Ford EcoBoost D35 3.5 L V6	DAY; 9	SEB; 5	LBH; 4	LGA; 1	WGL; 1	MOS; 1	LIM; 3	ELK; 2	VIR; 4	**COA**; 9	PET; 7		2nd	328
2017	Ford Chip Ganassi Racing	GTLM	Ford GT	Ford EcoBoost D35 3.5 L V6	DAY; 10	**SEB**; 4	LBH; 2	COA; 6	WGL; 2	MOS; 3	LIM; 5	ELK; 3	VIR; 2	LGA; 5	PET; 8		4th	306
2018	Ford Chip Ganassi Racing	GTLM	Ford GT	Ford EcoBoost D35 3.5 L V6	DAY; 1	SEB; 4	LBH; 2	MOH; 5	**WGL**; 6	MOS; 1	LIM; 6	ELK; 1	**VIR**; 7	LGA; 6	PET; 5		2nd	316
2019	Ford Chip Ganassi Racing	GTLM	Ford GT	Ford EcoBoost D35 3.5 L V6	DAY; 4	SEB; 6	LBH; 6	MOH; 5	WGL; 3	MOS; 5	LIM; 1	ELK; 1	VIR; 5	LGA; 6	PET; 2		4th	313
2020	Konica Minolta Cadillac	DPi	Cadillac DPi-V.R	Cadillac LT1 5.5 L V8	DAY; 1	DAY; 6	SEB; 2	ELK; 2	ATL; 5	MOH; 3	PET; 1	LGA; 6	SEB; 7				2nd	264
2021	Scuderia Corsa	GTD	Ferrari 488 GT3 Evo 2020	Ferrari F154CB 3.9 L Turbo V8	DAY; 14	SEB	MOH	DET	WGL	WGL	LIM	ELK	LGA	LBH	VIR	PET	68th	198
2023	Racers Edge Motorsports with WTR	GTD	Acura NSX GT3 Evo22	Acura JNC1 3.5 L Turbo V6	DAY; 6	SEB	LBH	LGA	WGL	MOS	LIM	ELK	VIR	IMS	PET		51st	280

=== 24 Hours of Daytona results ===
Year	Team	Co-drivers	Car	Class	Laps	Pos.	Class pos.
2005	(United States) CompUSA Chip Ganassi with Felix Sabates	(United States) Scott Pruett (Mexico) Luis Díaz	Riley MkXI-Lexus	DP	688	7th	7th
2006	(United States) SunTrust Racing	(South Africa) Wayne Taylor (France) Emmanuel Collard (Italy) Max Angelelli	Riley MkXI-Pontiac	DP	123	DNF	DNF
2008	(United States) Penske-Taylor Racing	(Brazil) Hélio Castroneves (United States) Kurt Busch	Riley MkXI-Pontiac	DP	689	**3rd**	**3rd**
2009	(United States) Penske Racing	(France) Romain Dumas (Germany) Timo Bernhard	Riley MkXX-Porsche	DP	717	6th	6th
2011	(United States) SunTrust Racing	(Italy) Max Angelelli (United States) Ricky Taylor	Dallara DP01-Chevrolet	DP	720	5th	5th
2012	(United States) SunTrust Racing	(Italy) Max Angelelli (United States) Ricky Taylor	Dallara Corvette DP	DP	14	DNF	DNF
2014	(United States) Corvette Racing	(Denmark) Jan Magnussen (Spain) Antonio García	Chevrolet Corvette C7.R	GTLM	329	DNF	DNF
2015	(United States) Corvette Racing	(Denmark) Jan Magnussen (Spain) Antonio García	Chevrolet Corvette C7.R	GTLM	725	4th	**1st**
2016	(United States) Ford Chip Ganassi Racing USA	(United Kingdom) Richard Westbrook (Germany) Stefan Mücke	Ford GT	GTLM	560	39th	9th
2017	(United States) Ford Chip Ganassi Racing	(United Kingdom) Richard Westbrook (New Zealand) Scott Dixon	Ford GT	GTLM	624	27th	10th
2018	(United States) Ford Chip Ganassi Racing	(United Kingdom) Richard Westbrook (New Zealand) Scott Dixon	Ford GT	GTLM	783	11th	**1st**
2019	(United States) Ford Chip Ganassi Racing	(United Kingdom) Richard Westbrook (New Zealand) Scott Dixon	Ford GT	GTLM	570	13th	4th
2020	(United States) Konica Minolta Cadillac	(New Zealand) Scott Dixon (Japan) Kamui Kobayashi (Netherlands) Renger van der Zande	Cadillac DPi-V.R	DPi	883	**1st**	**1st**
2021	(United States) Scuderia Corsa	(United States) Bret Curtis (Brazil) Marcos Gomes (United Arab Emirates) Ed Jones	Ferrari 488 GT3 Evo 2020	GTD	676	DNF	DNF

=== Complete 12 Hours of Sebring results ===
Year	Team	Co-drivers	Car	Class	Laps	Pos.	Class pos.
2007	(United States) Penske Racing	(Germany) Sascha Maassen (France) Emmanuel Collard	Porsche RS Spyder Evo	LMP2	297	23rd	8th
2008	(United States) Penske Racing	(United States) Patrick Long (Germany) Sascha Maassen	Porsche RS Spyder Evo	LMP2	29	DNF	DNF
2013	(United States) Level 5 Motorsports	(United States) Scott Tucker (United Kingdom) Marino Franchitti	HPD ARX-03b	P2	346	6th	**1st**
2014	(United States) Corvette Racing	(Denmark) Jan Magnussen (Spain) Antonio García	Chevrolet Corvette C7.R	GTLM	283	19th	8th
2015	(United States) Corvette Racing	(Denmark) Jan Magnussen (Spain) Antonio García	Chevrolet Corvette C7.R	GTLM	330	10th	**1st**
2016	(United States) Ford Chip Ganassi Racing	(New Zealand) Scott Dixon (United Kingdom) Richard Westbrook	Ford GT	GTLM	235	15th	5th
2017	(United States) Ford Chip Ganassi Racing	(New Zealand) Scott Dixon (United Kingdom) Richard Westbrook	Ford GT	GTLM	334	10th	4th

=== Complete 24 Hours of Le Mans results ===
Year	Team	Co-drivers	Car	Class	Laps	Pos.	Class pos.
2013	(United States) Level 5 Motorsports	(United States) Scott Tucker (United Kingdom) Marino Franchitti	HPD ARX-03b-Honda	LMP2	242	NC	NC
2015	(United States) Corvette Racing	(Denmark) Jan Magnussen (Spain) Antonio García	Chevrolet Corvette C7.R	GTE; Pro	0	DNS	DNS
2016	(United States) Ford Chip Ganassi Team USA	(New Zealand) Scott Dixon (United Kingdom) Richard Westbrook	Ford GT	GTE; Pro	340	20th	**3rd**
2017	(United States) Ford Chip Ganassi Team USA	(New Zealand) Scott Dixon (United Kingdom) Richard Westbrook	Ford GT	GTE; Pro	337	23rd	7th
2018	(United States) Ford Chip Ganassi Team USA	(New Zealand) Scott Dixon (United Kingdom) Richard Westbrook	Ford GT	GTE; Pro	309	39th	14th
2019	(United States) Ford Chip Ganassi Team USA	(New Zealand) Scott Dixon (United Kingdom) Richard Westbrook	Ford GT	GTE; Pro	341	24th	5th
2021	(United States) Glickenhaus Racing	(France) Romain Dumas (United Kingdom) Richard Westbrook	Glickenhaus SCG 007 LMH	Hypercar	364	5th	5th
2022	(United States) Glickenhaus Racing	(France) Franck Mailleux (United Kingdom) Richard Westbrook	Glickenhaus SCG 007 LMH	Hypercar	375	**3rd**	**3rd**
2023	(United States) Glickenhaus Racing	(France) Romain Dumas (France) Olivier Pla	Glickenhaus SCG 007 LMH	Hypercar	335	6th	6th

=== Complete FIA World Endurance Championship results ===
(key) (Races in bold indicate pole position) (Races in italics indicate fastest lap)

Year	Entrant	Class	Car	Engine	1	2	3	4	5	6	7	Rank	Points
2021	Glickenhaus Racing	Hypercar	Glickenhaus SCG 007 LMH	Glickenhaus P21 3.5 L Turbo V8	SPA	ALG; 4	MNZ	LMS; 5	BHR	BHR		6th	38
2022	Glickenhaus Racing	Hypercar	Glickenhaus SCG 007 LMH	Glickenhaus P21 3.5 L Turbo V8	SEB; 3	SPA	LMS	MNZ	FUJ	BHR		7th	23
2023	Glickenhaus Racing	Hypercar	Glickenhaus SCG 007 LMH	Glickenhaus P21 3.5 L Turbo V8	SEB; Ret	ALG; 8	SPA	LMS; 5	MNZ	FUJ		12th	24
2023	Vanwall Racing Team	Hypercar	Vanwall Vandervell 680	Gibson GL458 4.5 L V8							BHR; 12	12th	24

=== Supercars Championship results ===
(key) (Races in bold indicate pole position) (Races in italics indicate fastest lap)

V8 Supercar results
Year	Team	Car	1	2	3	4	5	6	7	8	9	10	11	12	13	14	15	16	17	18	19	20	21	22	23	24	25	26	27	28	29	30	31	32	33	34	35	36	37	Pos.	Pts
2006	Holden Racing Team	Holden VZ Commodore	ADE; R1	ADE; R2	PUK; R3	PUK; R4	PUK; R5	BAR; R6	BAR; R7	BAR; R8	WIN; R9	WIN; R10	WIN; R11	HDV; R12	HDV; R13	HDV; R14	QLD; R15	QLD; R16	QLD; R17	ORA; R18	ORA; R19	ORA; R20	SAN; R21; 21	BAT; R22; Ret	SUR; R23	SUR; R24	SUR; R25	SYM; R26	SYM; R27	SYM; R28	BHR; R29	BHR; R30	BHR; R31	PHI; R32	PHI; R33	PHI; R34				58th	120
2010	Holden Racing Team	Holden VE Commodore	YMC; R1	YMC; R2	BHR; R3	BHR; R4	ADE; R5	ADE; R6	HAM; R7	HAM; R8	QLD; R9	QLD; R10	WIN; R11	WIN; R12	HDV; R13	HDV; R14	TOW; R15	TOW; R16	PHI; Q	PHI; R17	BAT; R18; 25	SUR; R19; Ret	SUR; R20; 7	SYM; R21	SYM; R22	SAN; R23	SAN; R24	SYD; R25	SYD; R26											NC	0†
2011	Holden Racing Team	Holden VE Commodore	YMC; R1	YMC; R2	ADE; R3	ADE; R4	HAM; R5	HAM; R6	BAR; R7	BAR; R8	BAR; R9	WIN; R10	WIN; R11	HID; R12	HID; R13	TOW; R14	TOW; R15	QLD; R16	QLD; R17	QLD; R18	PHI; Q	PHI; R19	BAT; R20	SUR; R21; 11	SUR; R22; 23	SYM; R23	SYM; R24	SAN; R25	SAN; R26	SYD; R27	SYD; R28									72nd	108
2012	Holden Racing Team	Holden VE Commodore	ADE; R1	ADE; R2	SYM; R3	SYM; R4	HAM; R5	HAM; R6	BAR; R7	BAR; R8	BAR; R9	PHI; R10	PHI; R11	HID; R12	HID; R13	TOW; R14	TOW; R15	QLD; R16	QLD; R17	SMP; R18	SMP; R19	SAN; Q	SAN; R20	BAT; R21	SUR; R22; 4	SUR; R23; 5	YMC; R24	YMC; R25	YMC; R26	WIN; R27	WIN; R28	SYD; R29	SYD; R30							NC	0†
2013	Walkinshaw Racing	Holden VF Commodore	ADE; R1	ADE; R2	SYM; R3	SYM; R4	SYM; R5	PUK; R6	PUK; R7	PUK; R8	PUK; R9	BAR; R10	BAR; R11	BAR; R12	COA; R13	COA; R14	COA; R15	COA; R16	HID; R17	HID; R18	HID; R19	TOW; R20	TOW; R21	QLD; R22	QLD; R23	QLD; R24	WIN; R25	WIN; R26	WIN; R27	SAN; QR; 23	SAN; R28; 9	BAT; R29; 17	SUR; R30; 5	SUR; R31; 3	PHI; R32	PHI; R33	PHI; R34	SYD; R35	SYD; R36	35th	516

† Not Eligible for points
* Season still in progress

=== Complete Bathurst 1000 results ===
Year	Team	Car	Co-driver	Position	Laps
2006	Holden Racing Team	Holden Commodore VZ	(New Zealand) Jim Richards	DNF	24
2010	Walkinshaw Racing	Holden Commodore VE	(Australia) Andrew Thompson	25th	154
2013	Walkinshaw Racing	Holden Commodore VF	(Australia) Russell Ingall	17th	161

Sporting positions
Preceded by Felipe Massa	Italian Formula Renault Championship; Champion; 2001	Succeeded by José María López
Preceded by Tristan Gommendy (French series); Gary Paffett (German series)	Formula 3 Euro Series; Champion; 2003	Succeeded by Jamie Green
Preceded by Dirk Müller; Joey Hand	Michelin Endurance Cup; GTLM Champion; 2019; With: Richard Westbrook	Succeeded by Jesse Krohn; John Edwards
Preceded by Felipe Nasr; Pipo Derani; Eric Curran	Michelin Endurance Cup; Champion; 2020; With: Renger van der Zande	Succeeded by Filipe Albuquerque; Ricky Taylor; Alexander Rossi
