= 2012 V8 Supercar season =

Seasons
- ← 2011 2013 →

The 2012 V8 Supercar season was the sixteenth year in which V8 Supercars have contested the premier Australian Touring car racing series. It was the 53rd year of touring car racing in Australia since the first running of the Australian Touring Car Championship, now known as the International V8 Supercars Championship, and the Armstrong 500, the fore-runner of the present day Bathurst 1000.

The season began on 1 March at the Adelaide Street Circuit and concluded on 2 December at the Homebush Street Circuit. It featured the sixteenth V8 Supercar Championship, contested over 30 races at 15 events. Thirteen of these events were held in the six states and the Northern Territory of Australia, and single events were staged in New Zealand and the United Arab Emirates. There was also a stand-alone, non-championship event supporting the 2012 Australian Grand Prix. The season also included the thirteenth second-tier Dunlop V8 Supercar Series, contested over seven rounds. For the fifth time a third-tier series was contested, the Kumho Tyres V8 Touring Car Series, which was expanded to six rounds for 2012.

== Race calendar ==
Dates sourced from:

Event title	Circuit	Location	Race / round	Date	Winner	Report
(South Australia) Clipsal 500	Adelaide Street Circuit	Adelaide, South Australia	IVC 1 IVC 2	1–4 March	Jamie Whincup; Will Davison	report
(South Australia) Clipsal 500	Adelaide Street Circuit	Adelaide, South Australia	DVS 1	1–4 March	Chaz Mostert	
(New South Wales) Eastern Creek	Eastern Creek Raceway	Sydney, New South Wales	KVTC 1	9–11 March	Josh Hunter	
(Victoria (state)) V8 Supercars Albert Park Challenge	Albert Park Street Circuit	Melbourne, Victoria	IVC NC	15–18 March	Mark Winterbottom	report
Falken Tasmania Challenge	Symmons Plains Raceway	Launceston, Tasmania	IVC 3 IVC 4	30 March – 1 April	Will Davison; Jamie Whincup	report
(South Australia) Mallala	Mallala Motor Sport Park	Mallala, South Australia	KVTC 2	13–15 April	Chris Smerdon	
(New Zealand) ITM Hamilton 400	Hamilton Street Circuit	Hamilton, New Zealand	IVC 5 IVC 6	20–22 April	Will Davison; Mark Winterbottom	report
(Western Australia) Trading Post Perth Challenge	Barbagallo Raceway	Perth, Western Australia	IVC 7 IVC 8 IVC 9	4–6 May	Mark Winterbottom; Will Davison; Will Davison	report
(Western Australia) Trading Post Perth Challenge	Barbagallo Raceway	Perth, Western Australia	DVS 2	4–6 May	Scott McLaughlin	
(Victoria (state)) Phillip Island 300	Phillip Island Grand Prix Circuit	Phillip Island, Victoria	IVC 10; IVC 11	18–20 May	Mark Winterbottom; Will Davison	report
(Northern Territory) Skycity Triple Crown	Hidden Valley Raceway	Darwin, Northern Territory	IVC 12; IVC 13	15–17 June	Jamie Whincup; Craig Lowndes	report
(Victoria (state)) Winton	Winton Motor Raceway	Benalla, Victoria	KVTC 3	22–24 June	Josh Hunter	
(Queensland) Sucrogen Townsville 400	Townsville Street Circuit	Townsville, Queensland	IVC 14; IVC 15	6–8 July	Jamie Whincup; Jamie Whincup	report
(Queensland) Sucrogen Townsville 400	Townsville Street Circuit	Townsville, Queensland	DVS 3	6–8 July	Scott McLaughlin	
(Queensland) Coates Hire Ipswich 300	Queensland Raceway	Ipswich, Queensland	IVC 16; IVC 17	3–5 August	Craig Lowndes; Craig Lowndes	report
(Queensland) Coates Hire Ipswich 300	Queensland Raceway	Ipswich, Queensland	DVS 4	3–5 August	Chaz Mostert	
Queensland Raceway	Queensland Raceway	Ipswich, Queensland	KVTC 4	10–12 August	Morgan Haber	
(New South Wales) Sydney Motorsport Park 360	Sydney Motorsport Park	Eastern Creek, New South Wales	IVC 18; IVC 19	24–26 August	Craig Lowndes; Jamie Whincup	report
(Victoria (state)) Dick Smith Sandown 500	Sandown Raceway	Melbourne, Victoria	IVC 20	14–16 September	Craig Lowndes; Warren Luff	report
(Victoria (state)) Phillip Island	Phillip Island Grand Prix Circuit	Phillip Island, Victoria	KVTC 5	21–23 September	Josh Hunter	
(New South Wales) Supercheap Auto Bathurst 1000	Mount Panorama Circuit	Bathurst, New South Wales	IVC 21	4–7 October	Jamie Whincup; Paul Dumbrell	report
(New South Wales) Supercheap Auto Bathurst 1000	Mount Panorama Circuit	Bathurst, New South Wales	DVS 5	4–7 October	Nick Percat	
(New South Wales) V8 Heritage Event	Wakefield Park	Goulburn, New South Wales	KVTC NC	11–12 October	Chris Delfsma	
(Queensland) Armor All Gold Coast 600	Surfers Paradise Street Circuit	Surfers Paradise, Queensland	IVC 22 IVC 23	19–21 October	Jamie Whincup; Sébastien Bourdais; Will Davison; Mika Salo	report
(United Arab Emirates) Yas V8 400	Yas Marina Circuit	Yas Island, United Arab Emirates	IVC 24; IVC 25; IVC 26	2–4 November	Jamie Whincup; Jamie Whincup; Jamie Whincup	report
(Victoria (state)) Winton	Winton Motor Raceway	Benalla, Victoria	IVC 27; IVC 28	16–18 November	Jamie Whincup; Craig Lowndes	report
(Victoria (state)) Winton	Winton Motor Raceway	Benalla, Victoria	DVS 6	16–18 November	Nick Percat	
(Victoria (state)) Sandown	Sandown Raceway	Melbourne, Victoria	KVTC 6	23–25 November	Josh Hunter	
(New South Wales) Sydney Telstra 500	Homebush Street Circuit	Sydney, New South Wales	IVC 29; IVC 30	30 November – 2 December	Craig Lowndes; Will Davison	report
(New South Wales) Sydney Telstra 500	Homebush Street Circuit	Sydney, New South Wales	DVS 7	30 November – 2 December	Scott Pye	

- IVC – International V8 Supercar Championship
- DVS – Dunlop V8 Supercar Series
- KVTC – Kumho Tyres V8 Touring Car Series
- NC – Non-championship
