= 2012 International V8 Supercars Championship =

Motor racing competition

The 2012 International V8 Supercar Championship (often simplified to the 2012 V8 Supercars Championship) was an FIA-sanctioned international motor racing series for V8 Supercars. It was the fourteenth running of the V8 Supercar Championship Series and the sixteenth series in which V8 Supercars have contested the premier Australian touring car title. The championship began on 1 March at the Clipsal 500 and concluded on 2 December at the Homebush Street Circuit.

Jamie Whincup and Triple Eight Race Engineering started the season as the defending drivers' and teams' champions.

Whincup successfully defended his drivers' championship, wrapping up the title at Winton, with Triple Eight Race Engineering also wrapping up the teams' championship. Whincup's teammate Craig Lowndes took second in the points standings from Mark Winterbottom of Ford Performance Racing.

== Teams and drivers ==
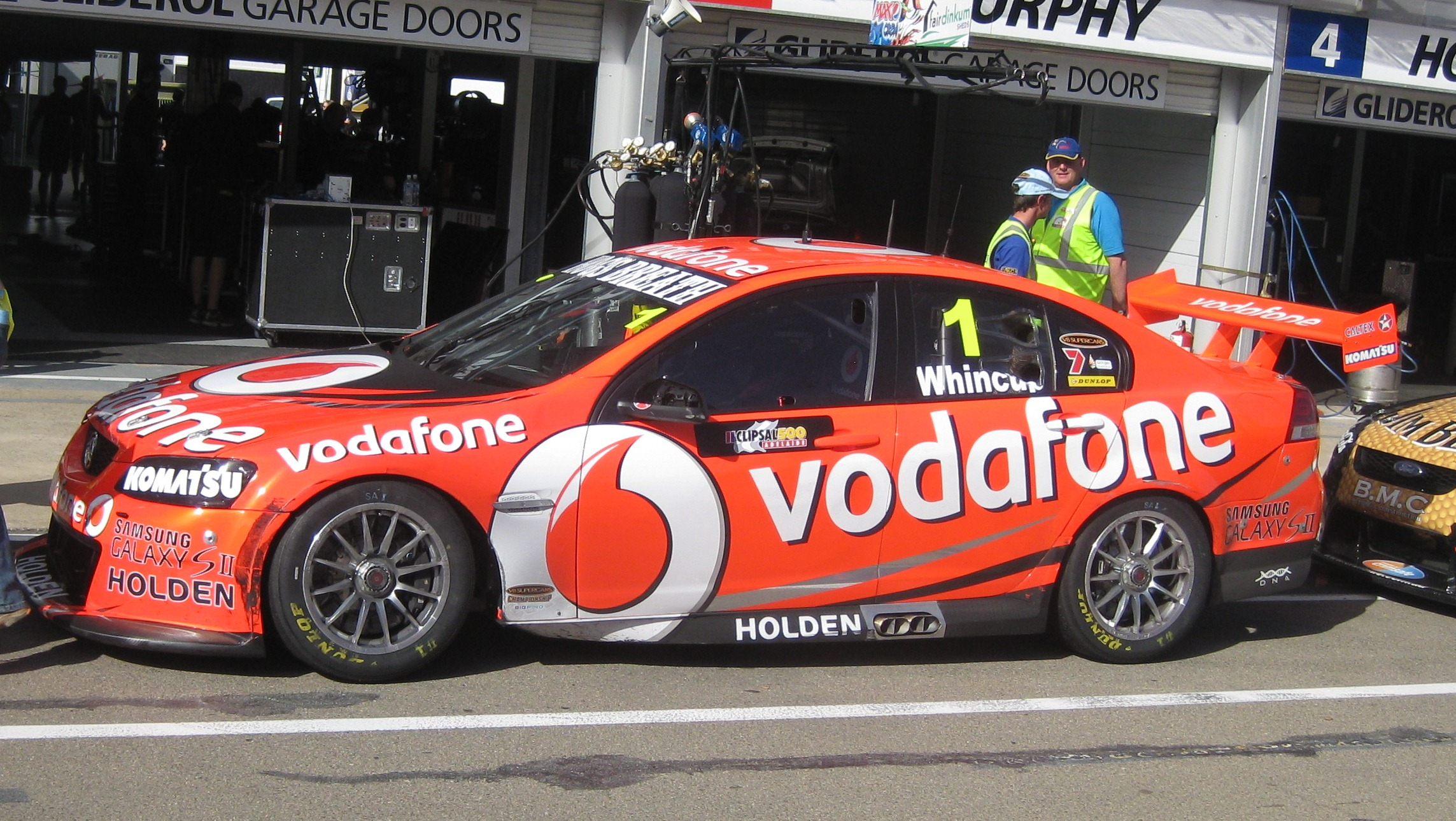
Jamie Whincup won the championship driving a Holden VE Commodore

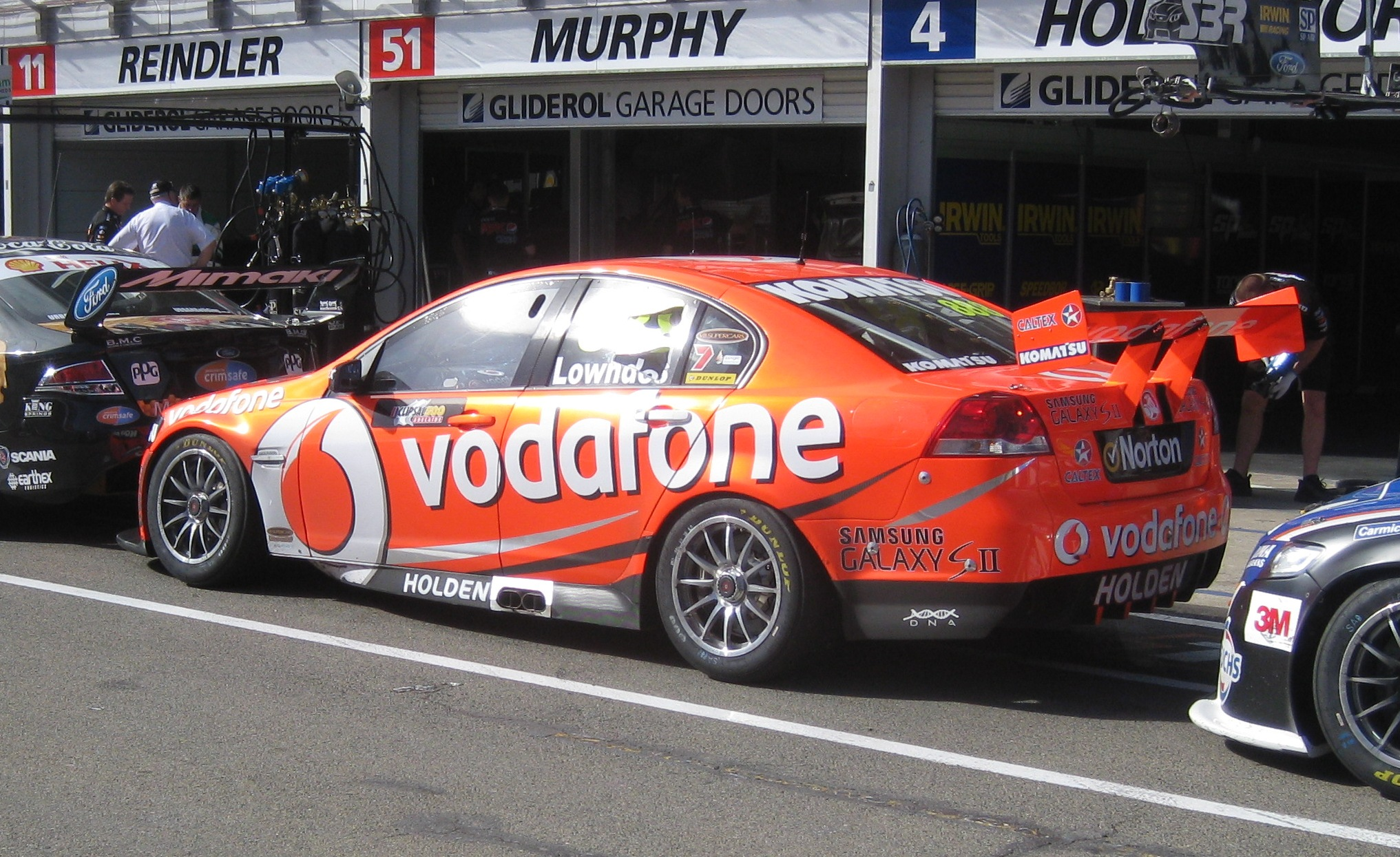
Craig Lowndes placed second driving a Holden VE Commodore

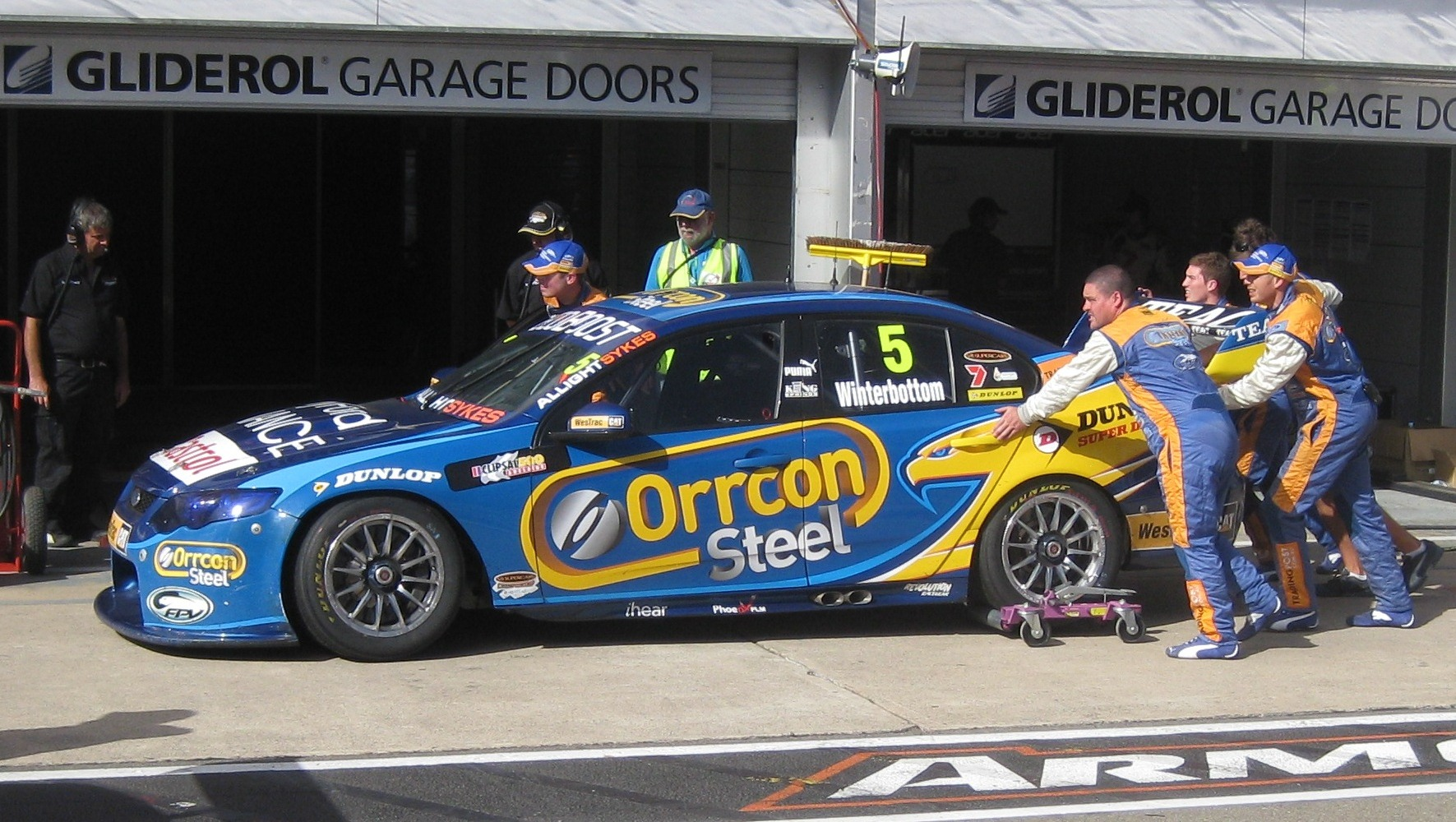
Mark Winterbottom placed third driving a Ford FG Falcon

The following teams and drivers competed in the 2012 championship.

Championship entries						Endurance entries	
Manufacturer	Model	Team	No.	Driver name	Rounds	Sandown/Bathurst	Gold Coast
Ford	Falcon FG	Tony D'Alberto Racing	3	(Australia) Tony D'Alberto	All	(Australia) Dale Wood	(Italy) Vitantonio Liuzzi
Ford	Falcon FG	Stone Brothers Racing	4	(Australia) Lee Holdsworth	All	(New Zealand) Craig Baird	(France) Simon Pagenaud
Ford	Falcon FG	Stone Brothers Racing	9	(New Zealand) Shane van Gisbergen	All	(Australia) Luke Youlden	(Netherlands) Jeroen Bleekemolen
Ford	Falcon FG	Ford Performance Racing	5	(Australia) Mark Winterbottom	All	(New Zealand) Steven Richards	(Australia) Will Power
Ford	Falcon FG	Ford Performance Racing	6	(Australia) Will Davison	All	(New Zealand) John McIntyre	(Finland) Mika Salo
Ford	Falcon FG	Triple F Racing (DJR)	12	(Australia) Dean Fiore	All	(New Zealand) Matthew Halliday	(Italy) Gianni Morbidelli
Ford	Falcon FG	Dick Johnson Racing	17	(Australia) Steven Johnson	All	(Denmark) Allan Simonsen	(Italy) Max Papis
Ford	Falcon FG	Dick Johnson Racing	18	(Australia) James Moffat	All	(Australia) Alex Davison	(Netherlands) Peter Kox
Ford	Falcon FG	James Rosenberg Racing (SBR)	47	(Australia) Tim Slade	All	(Australia) Andrew Thompson	(Australia) David Brabham
Ford	Falcon FG	Paul Morris Motorsport (DJR)	49	(Australia) Steve Owen	All	(Australia) Paul Morris	(United States) Boris Said
Ford	Falcon FG	Rod Nash Racing (FPR)	55	(Australia) David Reynolds	All	(Australia) Dean Canto	(Germany) Nick Heidfeld
Holden	Commodore VE	Triple Eight Race Engineering	1	(Australia) Jamie Whincup	All	(Australia) Paul Dumbrell	(France) Sébastien Bourdais
Holden	Commodore VE	Triple Eight Race Engineering	888	(Australia) Craig Lowndes	All	(Australia) Warren Luff	(United Kingdom) Richard Lyons
Holden	Commodore VE	Holden Racing Team	2	(Australia) Garth Tander	All	(Australia) Nick Percat	(Australia) Ryan Briscoe
Holden	Commodore VE	Holden Racing Team	22	(Australia) James Courtney	All	(Australia) Cameron McConville	(United Kingdom) Darren Turner
Holden	Commodore VE	Kelly Racing	7	(Australia) Todd Kelly	1–11	(Australia) Tim Blanchard	—N/a
Holden	Commodore VE	Kelly Racing	7	(Australia) Tim Blanchard	12–15	—N/a	(United States) Marco Andretti
Holden	Commodore VE	Kelly Racing	11	(Australia) Karl Reindler	All	(New Zealand) Daniel Gaunt	(France) Franck Montagny
Holden	Commodore VE	Kelly Racing	15	(Australia) Rick Kelly	All	(Australia) David Russell	(United States) Graham Rahal
Holden	Commodore VE	Kelly Racing	51	(New Zealand) Greg Murphy	1, 3–5, 10–15	(Australia) Owen Kelly	(United Kingdom) Justin Wilson
Holden	Commodore VE	Kelly Racing	51	(Australia) David Russell	2, 6	—N/a	
Holden	Commodore VE	Kelly Racing	51	(Canada) Jacques Villeneuve	7–9	—N/a	
Holden	Commodore VE	Brad Jones Racing	8	(Australia) Jason Bright	All	(Australia) Andrew Jones	(France) Stéphane Sarrazin
Holden	Commodore VE	Brad Jones Racing	14	(New Zealand) Fabian Coulthard	All	(Australia) David Besnard	(France) Nicolas Minassian
Holden	Commodore VE	Tekno Autosports	19	(Australia) Jonathon Webb	All	(New Zealand) Scott McLaughlin	(Germany) Marc Lieb
Holden	Commodore VE	Tekno Autosports	91	(Australia) Michael Patrizi	All	(New Zealand) Jonny Reid	(Brazil) Lucas di Grassi
Holden	Commodore VE	Britek Motorsport (BJR)	21	(Australia) David Wall	All	(New Zealand) Chris Pither	(United Kingdom) Jamie Campbell-Walter
Holden	Commodore VE	Lucas Dumbrell Motorsport	30	(Australia) Taz Douglas	All	(Australia) Scott Pye	(United Kingdom) Mike Conway
Holden	Commodore VE	Garry Rogers Motorsport	33	(France) Alexandre Prémat	1–11, 13–15	(Australia) Jack Perkins	—N/a
Holden	Commodore VE	Garry Rogers Motorsport	33	(Australia) Greg Ritter	12	—N/a	(United States) Ricky Taylor
Holden	Commodore VE	Garry Rogers Motorsport	33	(New Zealand) Scott McLaughlin	15	—N/a	
Holden	Commodore VE	Garry Rogers Motorsport	34	(Australia) Michael Caruso	All	(Australia) Greg Ritter	(Canada) James Hinchcliffe
Holden	Commodore VE	Walkinshaw Racing (HRT)	66	(Australia) Russell Ingall	All	(Austria) Christian Klien	(United Kingdom) Peter Dumbreck
Wildcard entries
Holden	Commodore VE	Kelly Racing	23	—N/a	11	(Australia) Cam Waters (Australia) Jesse Dixon	—N/a

=== Team changes ===
Dick Johnson Racing expanded to three cars with Dean Fiore moving his Triple F Racing franchise to become a satellite team within DJR. Under the terms of the arrangement, Fiore would continue to use the No. 12 from the Triple F REC with Jim Beam sponsoring he and Steven Johnson, while James Moffat would acquire Norton as major sponsor for the No. 18 car. DJR later announced a fourth car by securing a lease of a Paul Morris Motorsport owned Racing Entitlement Contract with Steve Owen being confirmed as the driver.

Jonathon Webb's Tekno Autosports switched from running Ford Falcons to Holden Commodores. The team expanded to a two-car operation, leasing one of the Racing Entitlement Contracts owned by Paul Morris Motorsport. West Australian driver Michael Patrizi joined the team after driving in Carrera Cup in 2011.

=== Driver changes ===
Fabian Coulthard left Walkinshaw Racing and joined Brad Jones Racing, replacing Jason Bargwanna. Bargwanna was unable to find a drive with another team. Russell Ingall moved from Paul Morris Motorsport to Walkinshaw Racing, replacing Coulthard.

Alex Davison was also unable to secure a full-time drive for the 2012 season, and returned to the Australian Carrera Cup Championship. He was replaced at Stone Brothers by Lee Holdsworth, who left Garry Rogers Motorsport. This led to DTM, A1GP, Le Mans and Formula One test driver Alexandre Prémat joining Garry Rogers Motorsport.

Paul Dumbrell retired from full-time driving and joined Triple Eight Race Engineering as an endurance co-driver. David Reynolds left Kelly Racing to replace Dumbrell. Karl Reindler then joined Kelly Racing after two seasons with Britek Motorsport. David Wall joined Brad Jones Racing to replace Reindler after competing with the team as an endurance co-driver during the 2011 season.

Warren Luff left Lucas Dumbrell Motorsport, citing the team's uncertain future and unstable management as his reasons for leaving. The team later acquired an ex-Triple Eight Commodore from Paul Morris Motorsports. Luff was replaced by Taz Douglas.

=== Mid-season changes ===
Greg Murphy was ruled out of the Symmons Plains round due to a back injury sustained in a collision during the 2012 Clipsal 500. Dunlop Series driver David Russell replaced him for the event. Two weeks before the event at Hidden Valley Raceway, Murphy suffered a relapse of his back injury and Kelly Racing announced that he would be forced to sit out until at least the Sandown 500 endurance race. David Russell was retained as Murphy's replacement for Hidden Valley, with 1997 Formula One World Champion Jacques Villeneuve joining the team for Townsville, Queensland Raceway and Sydney Motorsport Park events.

Todd Kelly was ruled out of the final four events of the 2012 season, after undergoing surgery for a shoulder injury sustained in a training accident. Kelly's endurance partner, Tim Blanchard, replaced him for the remainder of the season.

Greg Ritter replaced Garry Rogers Motorsport's Alexandre Prémat for the Gold Coast 600.

Scott McLaughlin replaced Alexandre Prémat for Race 30 in Sydney after Prémat had to be removed from his car suffering from dehydration during Race 29 the day before.

=== Wildcard entries ===
There would only be one endurance wildcard for 2012. The number 23 entry was prepared by Dunlop Series team Minda Motorsport and operated by Kelly Racing. Cam Waters and Jesse Dixon would compete in the Bathurst 1000.

== Calendar ==
The championship was contested over thirty races at fifteen events. A provisional calendar was released on 8 October 2011.

Rnd.	Event name	Circuit	Date
1	(South Australia) Adelaide 500	Adelaide Street Circuit, Adelaide	1–4 March
2	Tasmania Challenge	Symmons Plains Raceway, Launceston	30 March – 1 April
3	(New Zealand) Hamilton 400	Hamilton Street Circuit, Hamilton	20–22 April
4	(Western Australia) Perth Challenge	Barbagallo Raceway, Wanneroo	4–6 May
5	(Victoria (state)) Phillip Island 300	Phillip Island Grand Prix Circuit, Phillip Island	18–20 May
6	(Northern Territory) Darwin Triple Crown	Hidden Valley Raceway, Darwin	15–17 June
7	(Queensland) Townsville 400	Reid Park Street Circuit, Townsville	6–8 July
8	(Queensland) Ipswich 300	Queensland Raceway, Willowbank	3–5 August
9	(New South Wales) Sydney Motorsport Park 360	Sydney Motorsport Park, Eastern Creek	25–26 August
10	(Victoria (state)) Sandown 500	Sandown Raceway, Springvale	14–16 September
11	(New South Wales) Bathurst 1000	Mount Panorama Circuit, Bathurst	4–7 October
12	(Queensland) Gold Coast 600	Surfers Paradise Street Circuit, Surfers Paradise	19–21 October
13	(United Arab Emirates) Yas Marina Circuit V8 Supercar Event	Yas Marina Circuit, Yas Island	2–4 November
14	(Victoria (state)) Winton	Winton Motor Raceway, Benalla	16–18 November
15	(New South Wales) Sydney 500	Homebush Street Circuit, Sydney Olympic Park	30 November – 2 December

Australian rounds
New Zealand rounds
United Arab Emirates rounds

=== Calendar changes ===
The Yas Marina Circuit V8 Supercar Event was moved from the first event of the championship to the first weekend of November, supporting the Abu Dhabi Formula One Grand Prix. It was changed to a three sprint-race format.

The Tasmania Challenge at Symmons Plains Raceway was moved from its November date to become the second event of the championship.

Phillip Island and Sandown switched formats. Phillip Island hosted a standalone race meeting in May, while Sandown returned to the 500 km endurance race format. The Sandown 500 featured a revised qualifying format.

The Queensland 300 was changed from the three-race structure which was used in 2011, returning to a more traditional two-race format.

The Saturday races at Symmons Plains, Phillip Island, Winton and Queensland Raceway were extended by twenty kilometres.

An additional international event was planned for the weekend of 11 November, confirmed by the Philippine Sports Commission to be held at Clark International Speedway but never ratified by V8 Supercars. At the 2012 Adelaide 500, V8 Supercars chairman Tony Cochrane said that the vacant place was "unlikely" to be filled by an Australian venue. On 22 April 2012, it was announced that an international location could not be secured for the November date, and the Winton event was moved to November to replace it. The Sydney Motorsport Park at Eastern Creek made a return to the calendar after a three-year absence to fill in Winton's original August date.

== Results and standings ==
=== Season summary ===
Round	Race	Event	Pole position	Fastest lap	Winning driver	Winning team	Report
1	1	Adelaide 500	(Australia) Craig Lowndes	(Australia) Jamie Whincup	(Australia) Jamie Whincup	Triple Eight Race Engineering	report
1	2	Adelaide 500	(Australia) Jamie Whincup	(Australia) Mark Winterbottom	(Australia) Will Davison	Ford Performance Racing	report
2	3	Tasmania Challenge	(Australia) Mark Winterbottom	(Australia) Mark Winterbottom	(Australia) Will Davison	Ford Performance Racing	report
2	4	Tasmania Challenge	(Australia) Craig Lowndes	(Australia) Craig Lowndes	(Australia) Jamie Whincup	Triple Eight Race Engineering	report
3	5	Hamilton 400	(Australia) Garth Tander	(Australia) Garth Tander	(Australia) Will Davison	Ford Performance Racing	report
3	6	Hamilton 400	(Australia) Will Davison	(Australia) Mark Winterbottom	(Australia) Mark Winterbottom	Ford Performance Racing	report
4	7	Perth Challenge	(Australia) Garth Tander	(Australia) James Courtney	(Australia) Mark Winterbottom	Ford Performance Racing	report
4	8	Perth Challenge	(Australia) Jamie Whincup	(Australia) Garth Tander	(Australia) Will Davison	Ford Performance Racing	report
4	9	Perth Challenge	(Australia) Jamie Whincup	(Australia) Jamie Whincup	(Australia) Will Davison	Ford Performance Racing	report
5	10	Phillip Island 300	(Australia) Mark Winterbottom	(Australia) Craig Lowndes	(Australia) Mark Winterbottom	Ford Performance Racing	report
5	11	Phillip Island 300	(Australia) Craig Lowndes	(Australia) Will Davison	(Australia) Will Davison	Ford Performance Racing	report
6	12	Darwin Triple Crown	(Australia) Will Davison	(Australia) Craig Lowndes	(Australia) Jamie Whincup	Triple Eight Race Engineering	report
6	13	Darwin Triple Crown	(Australia) Will Davison	(Australia) Craig Lowndes	(Australia) Craig Lowndes	Triple Eight Race Engineering	report
7	14	Townsville 400	(Australia) Mark Winterbottom	(Australia) Craig Lowndes	(Australia) Jamie Whincup	Triple Eight Race Engineering	report
7	15	Townsville 400	(Australia) David Reynolds	(Australia) Mark Winterbottom	(Australia) Jamie Whincup	Triple Eight Race Engineering	report
8	16	Ipswich 300	(Australia) Craig Lowndes	(Australia) Lee Holdsworth	(Australia) Craig Lowndes	Triple Eight Race Engineering	report
8	17	Ipswich 300	(Australia) Will Davison	(Australia) Russell Ingall	(Australia) Craig Lowndes	Triple Eight Race Engineering	report
9	18	Sydney Motorsport Park 360	(Australia) Jamie Whincup	(Australia) Jonathon Webb	(Australia) Craig Lowndes	Triple Eight Race Engineering	report
9	19	Sydney Motorsport Park 360	(Australia) Craig Lowndes	(Australia) Garth Tander	(Australia) Jamie Whincup	Triple Eight Race Engineering	report
10	QR	Sandown 500	(New Zealand) John McIntyre	(Australia) Paul Dumbrell	(Australia) Luke Youlden	Stone Brothers Racing	report
10	QR	Sandown 500	(New Zealand) Shane van Gisbergen	(Australia) David Reynolds	(New Zealand) Shane van Gisbergen	Stone Brothers Racing	report
10	20	Sandown 500	(New Zealand) Shane van Gisbergen	(Australia) David Reynolds	(Australia) Craig Lowndes (Australia) Warren Luff	Triple Eight Race Engineering	report
11	21	Bathurst 1000	(Australia) Will Davison	(New Zealand) Shane van Gisbergen	(Australia) Jamie Whincup (Australia) Paul Dumbrell	Triple Eight Race Engineering	report
12	22	Gold Coast 600	(Australia) Jamie Whincup	(Australia) Mark Winterbottom	(Australia) Jamie Whincup (France) Sébastien Bourdais	Triple Eight Race Engineering	report
12	23	Gold Coast 600	(Australia) Jamie Whincup	(Australia) Mark Winterbottom	(Australia) Will Davison (Finland) Mika Salo	Ford Performance Racing	report
13	24	Yas Marina Circuit V8 Supercar Event	(Australia) Will Davison	(Australia) Jamie Whincup	(Australia) Jamie Whincup	Triple Eight Race Engineering	report
13	25	Yas Marina Circuit V8 Supercar Event	(Australia) Will Davison	(Australia) Jamie Whincup	(Australia) Jamie Whincup	Triple Eight Race Engineering	report
13	26	Yas Marina Circuit V8 Supercar Event	(Australia) Will Davison	(Australia) Jamie Whincup	(Australia) Jamie Whincup	Triple Eight Race Engineering	report
14	27	Winton	(Australia) Mark Winterbottom	(Australia) James Courtney	(Australia) Jamie Whincup	Triple Eight Race Engineering	report
14	28	Winton	(Australia) Jamie Whincup	(Australia) James Courtney	(Australia) Craig Lowndes	Triple Eight Race Engineering	report
15	29	Sydney 500	(Australia) Tim Slade	(Australia) Will Davison	(Australia) Craig Lowndes	Triple Eight Race Engineering	report
15	30	Sydney 500	(Australia) Garth Tander	(Australia) Mark Winterbottom	(Australia) Will Davison	Ford Performance Racing	report

=== Points system ===
Points were awarded to the driver or drivers of a car that had completed 75% of the race distance and was running at the completion of the final lap. Various different points scales were applied to events having one, two, or three, ensuring that a driver would be awarded 300 points for winning all races at any event.

Event format	Position																												
Event format	1st	2nd	3rd	4th	5th	6th	7th	8th	9th	10th	11th	12th	13th	14th	15th	16th	17th	18th	19th	20th	21st	22nd	23rd	24th	25th	26th	27th	28th	29th
Two-race	150	138	129	120	111	102	96	90	84	78	72	69	66	63	60	57	54	51	48	45	42	39	36	33	30	27	24	21	—N/a
Three-race	100	92	86	80	74	68	64	60	56	52	48	46	44	42	40	38	36	34	32	30	28	26	24	22	20	18	16	14	—N/a
Sandown qualifying races	50	46	43	40	37	34	32	30	28	26	24	23	22	21	20	19	18	17	16	15	14	13	12	11	10	9	8	7	—N/a
Sandown 500	200	184	172	160	148	136	128	120	112	104	96	92	88	84	80	76	72	68	64	60	56	52	48	44	40	36	32	28	—N/a
Bathurst 1000	300	276	258	240	222	204	192	180	168	156	144	138	132	126	120	114	108	102	96	90	84	78	72	66	60	54	48	42	36

Notes:

- Two-race format: denotes all races except the Perth, Sandown, Bathurst, Surfers Paradise, and Abu Dhabi events.
- Three-race format: the Perth Challenge at Barbagallo Raceway and the Yas Marina Circuit V8 Supercar Event at the Yas Marina Circuit consisted of three races rather than two. The total number of points on offer for each position remained the same as in other rounds, but were divided evenly across the three races.
- Sandown: two drivers share one car for the main race. The first qualifying race was for non-regular co-drivers, while the regular championship drivers contested the second qualifying race. Points from each race were awarded to both drivers.
- Bathurst: two drivers share one car for the race. The full points total was awarded to both drivers.
- Surfers Paradise: each of the 28 regular drivers is required to have an international co-driver, who is eligible to score points in the race. An "international co-driver" is defined as a driver who is known for competing in racing series outside Australia (the driver may be Australian but primarily raced in Asia, Europe, or the Americas), as opposed to a driver who competes with a racing licence issued by a country outside Australia and New Zealand (as is the case with Alexandre Premat, a Frenchman who is contesting the series as a regular driver).

=== Drivers' championship ===
Pos.	Driver	No.	ADE (South Australia)		SYM (Tasmania)		HAM (New Zealand)		BAR (Western Australia)			PHI (Victoria (state))		HID (Northern Territory)		TOW (Queensland)		QLD (Queensland)		SMP (New South Wales)		SAN (Victoria (state))			BAT (New South Wales)	SUR (Queensland)		YAS (United Arab Emirates)			WIN (Victoria (state))		SYD (New South Wales)		Pen.	Pts.
1	(Australia) Jamie Whincup	1	1	**4**	3	1	2	2	2	**2**	**3**	Ret	5	1	2	1	1	3	3	**23**	1		19	3	1	**1**	**2**	1	1	1	1	**3**	5	5		3861
2	(Australia) Craig Lowndes	888	**4**	5	5	**Ret**	4	4	3	6	6	15	**2**	4	1	5	2	**1**	1	1	**2**		7	1	3	6	6	8	11	11	2	1	1	2	50	3522
3	(Australia) Mark Winterbottom	5	9	2	**2**	5	23	1	1	3	2	**1**	6	3	3	**2**	5	2	2	2	3		16	2	11	3	3	6	4	5	**4**	2	9	18		3457
4	(Australia) Will Davison	6	2	1	1	3	1	**3**	25	1	1	Ret	1	**2**	**6**	12	3	6	**4**	3	5		27	17	**24**	18	1	**2**	**2**	**2**	Ret	11	19	1		3049
5	(Australia) Tim Slade	47	12	10	8	4	15	11	6	7	8	3	12	6	10	21	12	9	8	16	14		4	7	7	5	4	4	6	3	6	5	**2**	4		2790
6	(New Zealand) Shane van Gisbergen	9	11	6	4	2	22	10	7	11	18	2	4	7	7	22	7	7	7	7	13		**1**	**5**	12	10	9	3	3	4	Ret	4	Ret	Ret		2554
7	(Australia) Garth Tander	2	3	3	7	22	**3**	26	**Ret**	10	14	4	10	8	9	3	4	27	15	4	9		3	4	25	4	5	7	5	7	8	13	21	**16**	75	2462
8	(Australia) Lee Holdsworth	4	5	8	9	6	13	6	4	5	21	5	9	10	12	9	26	26	Ret	26	21		13	8	8	Ret	8	5	8	8	3	10	DNS	12		2189
9	(Australia) David Reynolds	55	Ret	7	6	26	Ret	7	13	9	26	21	8	5	8	6	**6**	22	26	13	7		2	6	2	Ret	13	13	7	12	11	8	17	7	50	2187
10	(Australia) James Courtney	22	Ret	25	18	8	7	22	5	13	12	18	13	12	11	10	15	15	14	6	10		8	9	4	7	17	Ret	14	13	24	18	3	3		2153
11	(New Zealand) Fabian Coulthard	14	6	9	16	11	9	5	15	4	7	22	24	24	5	4	Ret	4	5	12	6		18	15	23	Ret	10	11	10	10	14	12	Ret	15		2035
12	(Australia) Jonathon Webb	19	23	DNS	Ret	9	19	13	14	21	20	7	7	9	15	19	8	Ret	Ret	9	17		9	10	6	2	14	10	9	EX	7	7	4	6	50	1987
13	(Australia) Russell Ingall	66	13	13	24	25	10	14	11	17	13	11	15	23	Ret	11	Ret	5	6	5	4		15	11	9	9	7	18	16	16	12	9	12	Ret	25	1935
14	(Australia) Rick Kelly	15	7	11	19	16	5	12	9	20	19	6	Ret	Ret	23	8	20	12	25	17	15		6	12	15	8	11	27	12	9	13	19	6	11		1894
15	(Australia) Michael Caruso	34	22	22	15	7	8	25	8	12	9	23	20	Ret	4	14	25	8	9	8	11		5	14	5	Ret	Ret	16	15	15	Ret	16	10	Ret		1770
16	(Australia) Jason Bright	8	Ret	16	25	14	12	21	10	8	4	8	3	13	13	Ret	10	20	17	10	8		10	13	21	12	Ret	19	17	Ret	20	6	Ret	9		1737
17	(Australia) Steven Johnson	17	10	17	11	21	11	15	19	19	10	19	17	18	19	17	13	10	11	27	19		12	21	17	16	12	15	22	18	16	26	Ret	10		1621
18	(Australia) Michael Patrizi	91	14	15	20	17	17	Ret	18	14	5	9	25	16	18	16	9	17	12	15	12		24	Ret	Ret	11	DNS	12	18	19	9	27	16	19	62	1397
19	(Australia) Dean Fiore	12	16	19	22	18	16	16	16	18	15	17	19	19	17	24	18	11	20	25	18		21	16	22	17	19	17	23	Ret	19	14	15	21	75	1395
20	(Australia) Steve Owen	49	19	14	13	12	6	Ret	Ret	27	16	10	21	14	22	7	11	16	10	20	22		22	25	Ret	Ret	18	23	20	20	15	20	13	8	75	1393
21	(Australia) James Moffat	18	15	Ret	14	19	Ret	18	Ret	24	22	Ret	16	21	Ret	13	23	18	19	19	16		11	26	10	Ret	Ret	9	13	6	5	17	8	22	25	1354
22	(Australia) Todd Kelly	7	8	23	10	10	14	9	21	22	23	12	11	11	14	15	21	13	16	14	23		17	18	18										50	1263
23	(Australia) Tony D'Alberto	3	21	12	26	15	18	8	20	15	Ret	13	Ret	15	21	18	14	25	13	11	20		14	23	Ret	Ret	DNS	14	19	17	10	23	11	Ret	112	1176
24	(Australia) Karl Reindler	11	20	20	23	24	Ret	20	23	23	17	16	23	17	Ret	25	22	14	21	22	25		25	20	19	Ret	DNS	21	21	Ret	21	15	7	14	25	1147
25	(Australia) David Wall	21	18	21	Ret	23	21	23	22	25	Ret	14	Ret	20	Ret	20	19	21	18	18	28		20	22	14	15	15	22	28	23	17	25	20	Ret		1142
26	(Australia) Taz Douglas	30	Ret	24	12	20	20	19	24	26	25	20	18	Ret	16	23	17	23	22	21	24		28	24	Ret	14	16	26	24	22	23	24	18	13	50	1079
27	(France) Alexandre Prémat	33	17	18	17	13	Ret	24	17	28	24	Ret	22	22	20	Ret	16	19	23	28	27		23	19	16			20	25	14	18	21	Ret		87	942
28	(New Zealand) Greg Murphy	51	24	DNS			Ret	17	12	16	11	24	14										26	27	13	13	20	25	27	Ret	Ret	Ret	Ret	Ret		649
29	(Australia) Paul Dumbrell	1																				2		3	1											534
30	(Australia) Warren Luff	888																				5		1	3											527
31	(Australia) Dean Canto	55																				3		6	2											501
32	(Australia) Tim Blanchard	7																				17		18	18	Ret	Ret	24	26	21	22	22	14	20		460
33	(New Zealand) Scott McLaughlin	19/33																				7		10	6									17		422
34	(Australia) Cameron McConville	22																				11		9	4											406
35	(Australia) Andrew Thompson	47																				8		7	7											390
36	(Australia) Luke Youlden	9																				1		**5**	12											386
37	(Australia) Greg Ritter	34/33																				9		14	5	Ret	DNS									371
38	(New Zealand) Steven Richards	5																				EX		2	11											347
39	(New Zealand) Craig Baird	4																				14		8	8											343
40	(Australia) David Russell	51/15			21	Ret								Ret	Ret							12		12	15											311
41	(Australia) Nick Percat	2																				6		4	25											297
42	(Australia) Alex Davison	18																				10		26	10											242
43	(Australia) Andrew Jones	8																				13		13	21											220
44	(New Zealand) Chris Pither	21																				18		22	14											210
45	(Australia) Jack Perkins	33																				20		19	16											205
46	(New Zealand) Matt Halliday	12																				15		16	22											188
47	(Australia) Owen Kelly	51																				21		27	13											187
48	(New Zealand) John McIntyre	6																				**4**		17	24											186
49	(Australia) David Besnard	14																				23		15	23											181
50	(New Zealand) Daniel Gaunt	11																				24		20	19											177
51	(Austria) Christian Klien	66																				19		11	9											168
52	(Denmark) Allan Simonsen	17																				26		21	17											108
53	(Australia) Jesse Dixon	23																							20											90
54	(Australia) Cam Waters	23																							20											90
55	(Australia) Dale Wood	3																				16		23	Ret											88
56	(Australia) Scott Pye	30																				22		24	Ret											64
57	(Australia) Paul Morris	49																				27		26	Ret											61
58	(New Zealand) Jonny Reid	91																				25		Ret	Ret											21
—	(Canada) Jacques Villeneuve^{1}	51														Ret	24	24	24	24	26															0
Pos.	Driver	No.	ADE (South Australia)		SYM (Tasmania)		HAM (New Zealand)		BAR (Western Australia)			PHI (Victoria (state))		HID (Northern Territory)		TOW (Queensland)		QLD (Queensland)		SMP (New South Wales)		SAN (Victoria (state))			BAT (New South Wales)	SUR (Queensland)		YAS (United Arab Emirates)			WIN (Victoria (state))		SYD (New South Wales)		Pen.	Pts.

Colour	Result
Gold	Winner
Silver	Second place
Bronze	Third place
Green	Points classification
Blue	Non-points classification
Blue	Non-classified finish (NC)
Purple	Retired, not classified (Ret)
Red	Did not qualify (DNQ)
Red	Did not pre-qualify (DNPQ)
Black	Disqualified (DSQ)
White	Did not start (DNS)
White	Withdrew (WD)
White	Race cancelled (C)
Blank	Did not practice (DNP)
Blank	Did not arrive (DNA)
Blank	Excluded (EX)

Bold - Pole position
Italics - Fastest lap

Notes:

- **^1** — Driver ineligible to score points.

=== Teams' championship ===
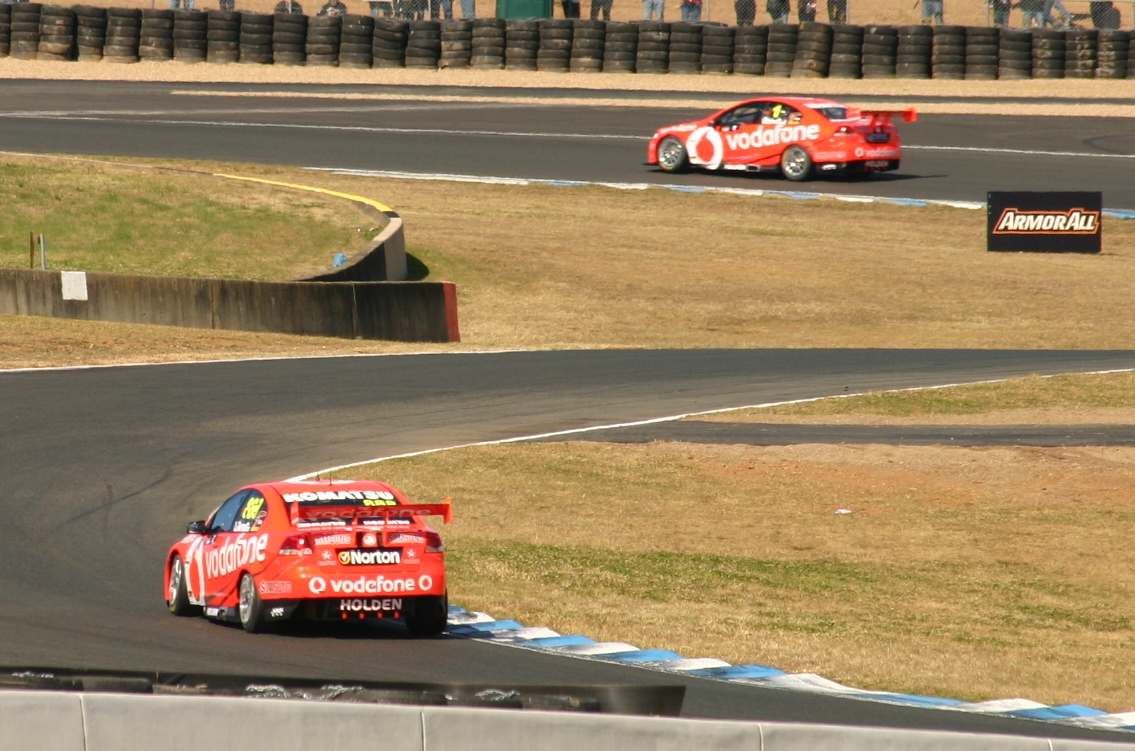
Triple Eight Race Engineering was awarded the Teams Championship

Pos.	Team	No.	ADE (South Australia)		SYM (Tasmania)		HAM (New Zealand)		BAR (Western Australia)			PHI (Victoria (state))		HID (Northern Territory)		TOW (Queensland)		QLD (Queensland)		SMP (New South Wales)		SAN (Victoria (state))			BAT (New South Wales)	SUR (Queensland)		YAS (United Arab Emirates)			WIN (Victoria (state))		SYD (New South Wales)		Pen.	Pts.
1	Triple Eight Race Engineering	1	1	**4**	3	1	2	2	2	**2**	**3**	Ret	5	1	2	1	1	3	3	**23**	1	2	19	3	1	**1**	**2**	1	1	1	1	**3**	5	5		7433
1	Triple Eight Race Engineering	888	**4**	5	5	**Ret**	4	4	3	6	6	15	**2**	4	1	5	2	**1**	1	1	**2**	5	7	1	3	6	6	8	11	11	2	1	1	2		7433
2	Ford Performance Racing	5	9	2	**2**	5	23	1	1	3	2	**1**	6	3	3	**2**	5	2	2	2	3	EX	16	2	11	3	3	6	4	5	**4**	2	9	18		6506
2	Ford Performance Racing	6	2	1	1	3	1	**3**	25	1	1	Ret	1	**2**	**6**	12	3	6	**4**	3	5	**4**	27	17	**24**	18	1	**2**	**2**	**2**	Ret	11	19	1		6506
3	Stone Brothers Racing	4	5	8	9	6	13	6	4	5	21	5	9	10	12	9	26	26	Ret	26	21	14	13	8	8	Ret	8	5	8	8	3	10	DNS	12		4743
3	Stone Brothers Racing	9	11	6	4	2	22	10	7	11	18	2	4	7	7	22	7	7	7	7	13	1	**1**	**5**	12	10	9	3	3	4	Ret	4	Ret	Ret		4743
4	Holden Racing Team	2	3	3	7	22	**3**	26	**Ret**	10	14	4	10	8	9	3	4	27	15	4	9	6	3	4	25	4	5	7	5	7	8	13	21	**16**		4690
4	Holden Racing Team	22	Ret	25	18	8	7	22	5	13	12	18	13	12	11	10	15	15	14	6	10	11	8	9	4	7	17	Ret	14	13	24	18	3	3		4690
5	Brad Jones Racing	8	Ret	16	25	14	12	21	10	8	4	8	3	13	13	Ret	10	20	17	10	8	13	10	13	21	12	Ret	19	17	Ret	20	6	Ret	9		3772
5	Brad Jones Racing	14	6	9	16	11	9	5	15	4	7	22	24	24	5	4	Ret	4	5	12	6	23	18	15	23	Ret	10	11	10	10	14	12	Ret	15		3772
6	Tekno Autosports	19	23	DNS	Ret	9	19	13	14	21	20	7	7	9	15	19	8	Ret	Ret	9	17	7	9	10	6	2	14	10	9	EX	7	7	4	6		3496
6	Tekno Autosports	91	14	15	20	17	17	Ret	18	14	5	9	25	16	18	16	9	17	12	15	12	25	24	Ret	Ret	11	DNS	12	18	19	9	27	16	19		3496
7	Kelly Racing	7	8	23	10	10	14	9	21	22	23	12	11	11	14	15	21	13	16	14	23	17	17	18	18	Ret	Ret	24	26	21	22	22	14	20		3461
7	Kelly Racing	15	7	11	19	16	5	12	9	20	19	6	Ret	Ret	23	8	20	12	25	17	15	12	6	12	15	8	11	27	12	9	13	19	6	11		3461
8	Garry Rogers Motorsport	33	17	18	17	13	Ret	24	17	28	24	Ret	22	22	20	Ret	16	19	23	28	27	20	23	19	16	Ret	DNS	20	25	14	18	21	Ret	17		2853
8	Garry Rogers Motorsport	34	22	22	15	7	8	25	8	12	9	23	20	Ret	4	14	25	8	9	8	11	9	5	14	5	Ret	Ret	16	15	15	Ret	16	10	Ret		2853
9	James Rosenberg Racing	47	12	10	8	4	15	11	6	7	8	3	12	6	10	21	12	9	8	16	14	8	4	7	7	5	4	4	6	3	6	5	**2**	4		2790
10	Rod Nash Racing	55	Ret	7	6	26	Ret	7	13	9	26	21	8	5	8	6	**6**	22	26	13	7	3	2	6	2	Ret	13	13	7	12	11	8	17	7		2237
11	Kelly Racing	11	20	20	23	24	Ret	20	23	23	17	16	23	17	Ret	25	22	14	21	22	25	24	25	20	19	Ret	DNS	21	21	Ret	21	15	7	14		2022
11	Kelly Racing	51	24	DNS	21	Ret	Ret	17	12	16	11	24	14	Ret	Ret	Ret	24	24	24	24	26	21	26	27	13	13	20	25	27	Ret	Ret	Ret	Ret	Ret		2022
12	Walkinshaw Racing	66	13	13	24	25	10	14	11	17	13	11	15	23	Ret	11	Ret	5	6	5	4	19	15	11	9	9	7	18	16	16	12	9	12	Ret		1960
13	Dick Johnson Racing (17)	17	10	17	11	21	11	15	19	19	10	19	17	18	19	17	13	10	11	27	19	26	12	21	17	16	12	15	22	18	16	26	Ret	10		1621
14	Triple F Racing	12	16	19	22	18	16	16	16	18	15	17	19	19	17	24	18	11	20	25	18	15	21	16	22	17	19	17	23	Ret	19	14	15	21		1470
15	Paul Morris Motorsport	49	19	14	13	12	6	Ret	Ret	27	16	10	21	14	22	7	11	16	10	20	22	27	22	25	Ret	Ret	18	23	20	20	15	20	13	8		1468
16	Dick Johnson Racing (18)	18	15	Ret	14	19	Ret	18	Ret	24	22	Ret	16	21	Ret	13	23	18	19	19	16	10	11	26	10	Ret	Ret	9	13	6	5	17	8	22	25	1354
17	Tony D'Alberto Racing	3	21	12	26	15	18	8	20	15	Ret	13	Ret	15	21	18	14	25	13	11	20	16	14	23	Ret	Ret	DNS	14	19	17	10	23	11	Ret		1288
18	Britek Motorsport	21	18	21	Ret	23	21	23	22	25	Ret	14	Ret	20	Ret	20	19	21	18	18	28	18	20	22	14	15	15	22	28	23	17	25	20	Ret		1142
19	Lucas Dumbrell Motorsport	30	Ret	24	12	20	20	19	24	26	25	20	18	Ret	16	23	17	23	22	21	24	22	28	24	Ret	14	16	26	24	22	23	24	18	13		1129
20	Kelly Racing (w)	23																							20											90
Pos.	Team	No.	ADE (South Australia)		SYM (Tasmania)		HAM (New Zealand)		BAR (Western Australia)			PHI (Victoria (state))		HID (Northern Territory)		TOW (Queensland)		QLD (Queensland)		SMP (New South Wales)		SAN (Victoria (state))			BAT (New South Wales)	SUR (Queensland)		YAS (United Arab Emirates)			WIN (Victoria (state))		SYD (New South Wales)		Pen.	Pts.

Colour	Result
Gold	Winner
Silver	Second place
Bronze	Third place
Green	Points classification
Blue	Non-points classification
Blue	Non-classified finish (NC)
Purple	Retired, not classified (Ret)
Red	Did not qualify (DNQ)
Red	Did not pre-qualify (DNPQ)
Black	Disqualified (DSQ)
White	Did not start (DNS)
White	Withdrew (WD)
White	Race cancelled (C)
Blank	Did not practice (DNP)
Blank	Did not arrive (DNA)
Blank	Excluded (EX)

Bold - Pole position
Italics - Fastest lap

- (w) - denotes wildcard entry

=== Manufacturers' championship ===
The Manufacturers championship was awarded to Holden.

== See also ==
- 2012 V8 Supercar season
