= 2012 Phillip Island 300 =

2012 V8 Supercar championship race

(Victoria (state)) 2012 Phillip Island 300
Event Information
- Round 5 of 15 in the 2012 International V8 Supercars Championship
- Date: 18–20 May 2012
- Location: Phillip Island, Victoria
- Venue: Phillip Island Grand Prix Circuit
- Weather: Fine

Results
Race 1
Distance	32 laps	140 km
Pole position	Mark Winterbottom; Ford Performance Racing	1:32:1320
Winner	Mark Winterbottom; Ford Performance Racing	55:50:2117
Race 2
Distance	45 laps	200 km
Pole position	Craig Lowndes; Triple Eight Race Engineering	1:32:3167
Winner	Will Davison; Ford Performance Racing	1:19:46:1086

The 2012 Phillip Island 300 was a motor race for the Australian sedan-based V8 Supercars. It was the fifth event of the 2012 International V8 Supercars Championship. It was held on the weekend of 18–20 May at the Phillip Island Grand Prix Circuit, in Phillip Island, Victoria.

The event was the second in a row in which Ford Performance Racing dominated with Mark Winterbottom winning the Saturday race. Winterbottom benefitted from a late safety car caused by a group of Cape Barren geese that bunched up the field and led to a collision between rivals Will Davison and Jamie Whincup who had been placing pressure on the leader. Neither driver was injured despite heavy damage to both cars. Craig Lowndes set new lap record on Saturday, breaking his own previous record that had stood for 13 years.

Will Davison recovered to win the Sunday race, his first at the circuit. The win moved him 10 points ahead of Whincup, who was only able to finish fifth in the Sunday race after crashing out of race one. Although the FPR duo won both races, Shane van Gisbergen was the best performed driver over the whole weekend.

== Standings ==
- After 11 of 30 races.

Pos	No	Name	Team	Points
1	6	(Australia) Will Davison	Ford Performance Racing	1216
2	1	(Australia) Jamie Whincup	Triple Eight Race Engineering	1206
3	5	(Australia) Mark Winterbottom	Ford Performance Racing	1187
4	888	(Australia) Craig Lowndes	Triple Eight Race Engineering	977
5	9	(New Zealand) Shane van Gisbergen	Stone Brothers Racing	953

Supercars Championship
Previous race: 2012 Trading Post Perth Challenge	2012 Supercars Championship	Next race: 2012 Skycity Triple Crown
Previous year: 2011 L&H 500	Phillip Island Super Sprint	Next year: 2013 Sargent Security Phillip Island 360
