= 2012 Sucrogen Townsville 400 =

2012 V8 Supercar championship race

(Queensland) 2012 Sucrogen Townsville 400
Event Information
- Round 7 of 15 in the 2012 International V8 Supercars Championship
- Date: 6–8 July 2012
- Location: Townsville, Queensland
- Venue: Townsville Street Circuit
- Weather: Fine

Results
Race 1
Distance	72 laps	205 km
Pole position	Mark Winterbottom; Ford Performance Racing	1:12:9887
Winner	Jamie Whincup; Triple Eight Race Engineering	1:36:36:6067
Race 2
Distance	72 laps	205 km
Pole position	David Reynolds; Rod Nash Racing	1:12:5817
Winner	Jamie Whincup; Triple Eight Race Engineering	1:33:49:2414

The 2012 Sucrogen Townsville 400 was a motor race for the Australian sedan-based V8 Supercars. It was the seventh event of the 2012 International V8 Supercars Championship. It was held on the weekend of 6–8 July at the Townsville Street Circuit, in Townsville, Queensland. The event was attended by 152,161 spectators and was estimated to have generated $32.4 million to the local economy across the weekend.

Points were awarded in two separate 200 km (120 mi) races, making a total distance of 400 km (250 mi) across the event weekend. Race 1, held on Saturday 7 July saw the first entry of 1997 Formula One world champion Jacques Villeneuve in the category.

== Standings ==
- After 15 of 30 races.

Pos	No	Name	Team	Points
1	1	Jamie Whincup	Triple Eight Race Engineering	1794
2	5	Mark Winterbottom	Ford Performance Racing	1694
3	6	Will Davison	Ford Performance Racing	1654
4	888	Craig Lowndes	Triple Eight Race Engineering	1496
5	9	Shane van Gisbergen	Stone Brothers Racing	1280

Supercars Championship
Previous race: 2012 Skycity Triple Crown	2012 Supercars Championship	Next race: 2012 Coates Hire Ipswich 300
Previous year: 2011 Sucrogen Townsville 400	Townsville 400	Next year: 2013 Sucrogen Townsville 400
