= 2011 V8 Supercar season =

Seasons
- ← 2010 2012 →

The 2011 V8 Supercar season was the fifteenth season of V8 Supercar motor racing and the fifteenth season in which V8 Supercars have contested the premier Australian touring car series. It was the 52nd year of touring car racing in Australia beginning with the 1960 season, which included the first Australian Touring Car Championship, now known as the International V8 Supercars Championship, and the first Armstrong 500, the fore-runner of the present day Bathurst 1000.

The 2011 season began on 11 February at the Yas Marina Circuit in Abu Dhabi and ended on 4 December at the Homebush Street Circuit. It featured the fifteenth V8 Supercar Championship, consisting of 26 races at 14 events covering all six states and the Northern Territory of Australia as well as events in the United Arab Emirates and New Zealand. There was also a stand-alone non-championship event supporting the 2011 Australian Grand Prix. The season also featured the twelfth second-tier V8 Supercar Development Series, this year officially known as the Fujitsu V8 Supercar Series and expanded to a seven-round series. The fourth third-tier series, the Kumho V8 Touring Car Series was contested over a five-round series.

== Race calendar ==
Dates sourced from:

Event title	Circuit	City / state	Race/round	Date	Winner	Team	Report
(United Arab Emirates) Yas V8 400	Yas Marina Circuit	Yas Island, United Arab Emirates	VSC 1 VSC 2	10–12 February	Jamie Whincup; James Courtney	Triple Eight Race Engineering; Holden Racing Team	report
(South Australia) Clipsal 500	Adelaide Street Circuit	Adelaide, South Australia	VSC 3 VSC 4	17–20 March	Garth Tander; Jamie Whincup	Holden Racing Team; Triple Eight Race Engineering	report
(South Australia) Clipsal 500	Adelaide Street Circuit	Adelaide, South Australia	FVS 1	17–20 March	Nick Percat	Walkinshaw Performance	
(Victoria (state)) Albert Park 400	Albert Park Street Circuit	Melbourne, Victoria	NC	24–27 March	Jamie Whincup	Triple Eight Race Engineering	report
(New South Wales) Wakefield Park	Wakefield Park	Goulburn, New South Wales	KVTC 1	1–3 April	Scott Loadsman	Loadsman Racing Team	
(New Zealand) ITM Hamilton 400	Hamilton Street Circuit	Hamilton, New Zealand	VSC 5 VSC 6	15–17 April	Rick Kelly; Shane van Gisbergen	Kelly Racing; Stone Brothers Racing	report
(Western Australia) Trading Post Perth Challenge	Barbagallo Raceway	Perth, Western Australia	VSC 7 VSC 8 VSC 9	6–8 May	Jamie Whincup; Jason Bright; Jamie Whincup	Triple Eight Race Engineering; Brad Jones Racing; Triple Eight Race Engineering	report
(Western Australia) Trading Post Perth Challenge	Barbagallo Raceway	Perth, Western Australia	FVS 2	6–8 May	Andrew Thompson	Triple Eight Race Engineering	
(South Australia) Mallala	Mallala Motorsport Park	Mallala, South Australia	KVTC 2	14–15 May	Chris Smerdon	Smerdon Racing	
(Victoria (state)) Winton	Winton Motor Raceway	Benalla, Victoria	VSC 10; VSC 11	20–22 May	Jamie Whincup; Jason Bright	Triple Eight Race Engineering; Brad Jones Racing	report
(Northern Territory) Skycity Triple Crown	Hidden Valley Raceway	Darwin, Northern Territory	VSC 12; VSC 13	17–19 June	Rick Kelly; Shane van Gisbergen	Kelly Racing; Stone Brothers Racing	report
(Queensland) Sucrogen Townsville 400	Townsville Street Circuit	Townsville, Queensland	VSC 14; VSC 15	8–10 July	Garth Tander; Jamie Whincup	Holden Racing Team; Triple Eight Race Engineering	report
(Queensland) Sucrogen Townsville 400	Townsville Street Circuit	Townsville, Queensland	FVS 3	8–10 July	Andrew Thompson	Triple Eight Race Engineering	
(New South Wales) Eastern Creek	Eastern Creek Raceway	Sydney, New South Wales	KVTC 3	15–17 July	Terry Wyhoon	Image Racing	
(Queensland) Coates Hire Ipswich 300	Queensland Raceway	Ipswich, Queensland	VSC 16; VSC 17	19–21 August	Craig Lowndes; Craig Lowndes; Craig Lowndes	Triple Eight Race Engineering; Triple Eight Race Engineering; Triple Eight Race Engineering	report
(Queensland) Coates Hire Ipswich 300	Queensland Raceway	Ipswich, Queensland	FVS 4	19–21 August	Andrew Thompson	Triple Eight Race Engineering	
(Victoria (state)) Sandown	Sandown Raceway	Melbourne, Victoria	KVTC 4	9–11 September	Scott Loadsman	Loadsman Racing Team	results
(Victoria (state)) L & H 500	Phillip Island Grand Prix Circuit	Phillip Island, Victoria	VSC 18	16–18 September	Craig Lowndes; Mark Skaife	Triple Eight Race Engineering	report
(New South Wales) Supercheap Auto Bathurst 1000	Mount Panorama Circuit	Bathurst, New South Wales	VSC 19	6–9 October	Garth Tander; Nick Percat	Holden Racing Team	report
(New South Wales) Supercheap Auto Bathurst 1000	Mount Panorama Circuit	Bathurst, New South Wales	FVS 5	6–9 October	Andrew Thompson	Triple Eight Race Engineering	
(Queensland) Armor All Gold Coast 600	Surfers Paradise Street Circuit	Surfers Paradise, Queensland	VSC 20 VSC 21	21–23 October	Jamie Whincup; Sébastien Bourdais; Mark Winterbottom; Richard Lyons	Triple Eight Race Engineering Ford Performance Racing	report
(Victoria (state)) Phillip Island	Phillip Island Grand Prix Circuit	Phillip Island, Victoria	KVTC 5	4–6 November	Terry Wyhoon	Image Racing	results
Falken Tasmania Challenge	Symmons Plains Raceway	Launceston, Tasmania	VSC 22; VSC 23	11–13 November	Jamie Whincup; Jamie Whincup	Triple Eight Race Engineering; Triple Eight Race Engineering	report
(Victoria (state)) Norton 360 Sandown Challenge	Queensland 300	Melbourne, Victoria	VSC 24; VSC 25	18–20 November	Rick Kelly; Jamie Whincup	Kelly Racing; Triple Eight Race Engineering	report
(Victoria (state)) Norton 360 Sandown Challenge	Queensland 300	Melbourne, Victoria	FVS 6	18–20 November	Andrew Thompson	Triple Eight Race Engineering	
(New South Wales) Sydney Telstra 500	Homebush Street Circuit	Sydney, New South Wales	VSC 26; VSC 27	3–5 December	Craig Lowndes; Mark Winterbottom	Triple Eight Race Engineering; Ford Performance Racing	report
(New South Wales) Sydney Telstra 500	Homebush Street Circuit	Sydney, New South Wales	FVS 7	3–5 December	Andrew Thompson	Triple Eight Race Engineering	

- VSC – International V8 Supercar Championship
- FVS – Fujitsu V8 Supercar Series
- KVTC – Kumho V8 Touring Car Series
- NC – Non-championship round
