= 2012 Sydney 500 =

Motor race

(New South Wales) 2012 Sydney Telstra 500
Event Information
- Round 15 of 15 in the 2012 International V8 Supercars Championship
- Date: 30 November–2 December 2012
- Location: Sydney, New South Wales
- Venue: Homebush Street Circuit
- Weather: Fine

Results
Race 1
Distance	74 laps	250 km
Pole position	Tim Slade; James Rosenberg Racing	1:29.5515
Winner	Craig Lowndes; Triple Eight Race Engineering	2:03:49.6940
Race 2
Distance	74 laps	250 km
Pole position	Garth Tander; Holden Racing Team	1:27.6295
Winner	Will Davison; Ford Performance Racing	1:57:50.5999

The 2012 Sydney Telstra 500 was a motor race for the Australian sedan-based V8 Supercars racing cars. It was the fifteenth and final event of the 2012 International V8 Supercars Championship. It was held on the weekend of 30 November–2 December at the Homebush Street Circuit in Sydney, New South Wales.

Craig Lowndes became the first driver to win two races at the circuit, winning on Saturday after first-time pole-sitter Tim Slade made a mistake late in the race. Will Davison gave Ford Performance Racing a strong finish to the year, winning the second race. James Courtney found form, finishing on the podium in both races. Series champion Jamie Whincup finished fifth in both races. There was some controversy when Whincup pulled over in the pit lane in the first race to let team-mate Lowndes past, in order to boost Lowndes' chances of finishing second in the championship, but no penalty was applied. Mark Winterbottom was beaten to second in the points standings by Lowndes after a disappointing weekend. The 2012 Dunlop Series champion Scott McLaughlin made his solo debut for Garry Rogers Motorsport (after having driven with Jonathon Webb at the endurance races), replacing Alex Prémat for the second race after Prémat suffered heat exhaustion on Saturday and was deemed unfit to race.

The event was also the final one for the Project Blueprint specification V8 Supercars, with the new Car of the Future regulations coming into effect in 2013.

== Standings ==
- After 30 of 30 races.

Pos	No	Name	Team	Points
1	1	Jamie Whincup	Triple Eight Race Engineering	3861
2	888	Craig Lowndes	Triple Eight Race Engineering	3522
3	5	Mark Winterbottom	Ford Performance Racing	3457
4	6	Will Davison	Ford Performance Racing	3049
5	47	Tim Slade	James Rosenberg Racing	2790
