= 2012 Winton Motor Raceway V8 Supercar Event =

2012 V8 Supercar championship race

(Victoria (state)) 2012 Winton Motor Raceway V8 Supercar Event
Event Information
- Round 14 of 15 in the 2012 International V8 Supercars Championship
- Date: 16–18 November 2012
- Location: Benalla, Victoria
- Venue: Winton Motor Raceway
- Weather: Fine

Results
Race 1
Distance	46 laps	140 km
Pole position	Mark Winterbottom; Ford Performance Racing	1:23.1443
Winner	Jamie Whincup; Triple Eight Race Engineering	1:08:36.3754
Race 2
Distance	67 laps	200 km
Pole position	Jamie Whincup; Triple Eight Race Engineering	1:22.7970
Winner	Craig Lowndes; Triple Eight Race Engineering	1:38:39.4858

The 2012 Winton Motor Raceway V8 Supercar event was a motor race for the Australian sedan-based V8 Supercars racing cars. It was the fourteenth event of the 2012 International V8 Supercars Championship. It was held on the weekend of 16-18 November at the Winton Motor Raceway near Benalla, Victoria.

Triple Eight Race Engineering won both races, with Jamie Whincup winning on Saturday and Craig Lowndes winning on Sunday. Whincup overcame a drive-through penalty in the second race to finish on the podium. In doing so, he secured his fourth V8 Supercar title with one round remaining, despite his closest rival Mark Winterbottom, of Ford Performance Racing, scoring the third-highest points total across the weekend.

== Standings ==
- After 28 of 30 races.

Pos	No	Name	Team	Points
1	1	Jamie Whincup	Triple Eight Race Engineering	3639
2	5	Mark Winterbottom	Ford Performance Racing	3322
3	888	Craig Lowndes	Triple Eight Race Engineering	3259
4	6	Will Davison	Ford Performance Racing	2851
5	9	Shane van Gisbergen	Stone Brothers Racing	2554
