= 2012 Falken Tasmania Challenge =

2012 V8 Supercar championship race

Event Information
- Round 2 of 15 in the 2012 International V8 Supercars Championship
- Date: 29 March–1 April 2012
- Location: Launceston, Tasmania
- Venue: Symmons Plains Raceway
- Weather: Fine

Results
Race 1
Distance	59 laps	140 km
Pole position	Mark Winterbottom; Ford Performance Racing	51.4020
Winner	Will Davison; Ford Performance Racing	52:30.5485
Race 2
Distance	84 laps	200 km
Pole position	Craig Lowndes; Triple Eight Race Engineering	51.0408
Winner	Jamie Whincup; Triple Eight Race Engineering	1:17:31.3871

The 2012 Falken Tasmania Challenge was a motor race for the Australian sedan-based V8 Supercars. It was the second event of the 2012 International V8 Supercars Championship. It was held on the weekend of 30 March–1 April at the Symmons Plains Raceway, near Launceston, Tasmania.

Race 3 of the championship was won by Victorian Ford driver Will Davison from Ford Performance Racing. Race 4, held the following day was won by fellow Victorian, Jamie Whincup driving a Holden for Triple Eight Race Engineering. Winchup had previously won the second day of the championship. Davison's third place in race four made him the leading performer of the event.

== Standings ==
- After 4 of 30 races.

Pos	No	Name	Team	Points
1	6	Will Davison	Ford Performance Racing	567
2	1	Jamie Whincup	Triple Eight Race Engineering	549
3	5	Mark Winterbottom	Ford Performance Racing	471
4	9	Shane van Gisbergen	Stone Brothers Racing	432
5	4	Lee Holdsworth	Stone Brothers Racing	387
