= 2012 Yas Marina Circuit V8 Supercar Event =

2012 V8 Supercar championship race

(United Arab Emirates) 2012 Yas Marina Circuit V8 Supercar Event
Event Information
- Round 13 of 15 in the 2012 International V8 Supercars Championship
- Date: 2-4 November 2012
- Location: Yas Island, United Arab Emirates
- Venue: Yas Marina Circuit
- Weather: Fine

Results
Race 1
Distance	12 laps	66 km
Pole position	Will Davison; Ford Performance Racing	2:11.766
Winner	Jamie Whincup; Triple Eight Race Engineering	27:05.295
Race 2
Distance	12 laps	66 km
Pole position	Will Davison; Ford Performance Racing	2:11.928
Winner	Jamie Whincup; Triple Eight Race Engineering	26:58.853
Race 3
Distance	12 laps	66 km
Pole position	Will Davison; Ford Performance Racing	2:12.241
Winner	Jamie Whincup; Triple Eight Race Engineering	30:36.684

The 2012 Etihad Airways Abu Dhabi (V8) Grand Prix was a motor race for the Australian sedan-based V8 Supercars racing cars. It was the thirteenth event of the 2012 International V8 Supercars Championship. It was held on the weekend of 2–4 November at the Yas Marina Circuit in Abu Dhabi, United Arab Emirates.

The event was the main support category for the Formula One Abu Dhabi Grand Prix. Holden driver Jamie Whincup dominated the weekend, winning all three races, after Ford driver Will Davison took all three pole positions.

== Results ==
=== Race 24 ===
==== Qualifying ====
Pos	No	Name	Car	Team	Time
1	6	(Australia) Will Davison	Ford Performance Racing	Ford FG Falcon	2:11.7660
2	1	(Australia) Jamie Whincup	Triple Eight Race Engineering	Holden VE Commodore	2:11.8850
3	9	(New Zealand) Shane van Gisbergen	Stone Brothers Racing	Ford FG Falcon	2:12.2550
4	47	(Australia) Tim Slade	James Rosenberg Racing	Ford FG Falcon	2:12.2630
5	4	(Australia) Lee Holdsworth	Stone Brothers Racing	Ford FG Falcon	2:12.4170
6	2	(Australia) Garth Tander	Holden Racing Team	Holden VE Commodore	2:12.4860
7	5	(Australia) Mark Winterbottom	Ford Performance Racing	Ford FG Falcon	2:12.5730
8	19	(Australia) Jonathon Webb	Tekno Autosports	Holden VE Commodore	2:12.5800
9	888	(Australia) Craig Lowndes	Triple Eight Race Engineering	Holden VE Commodore	2:12.6870
10	22	(Australia) James Courtney	Holden Racing Team	Holden VE Commodore	2:12.6880
11	55	(Australia) David Reynolds	Rod Nash Racing	Ford FG Falcon	2:12.7080
12	14	(New Zealand) Fabian Coulthard	Brad Jones Racing	Holden VE Commodore	2:12.7300
13	91	(Australia) Michael Patrizi	Tekno Autosports	Holden VE Commodore	2:12.7830
14	18	(Australia) James Moffat	Dick Johnson Racing	Ford FG Falcon	2:12.8140
15	34	(Australia) Michael Caruso	Garry Rogers Motorsport	Holden VE Commodore	2:12.8790
16	33	(France) Alexandre Premat	Garry Rogers Motorsport	Holden VE Commodore	2:12.9000
17	15	(Australia) Rick Kelly	Kelly Racing	Holden VE Commodore	2:12.9170
18	3	(Australia) Tony D'Alberto	Tony D'Alberto Racing	Ford FG Falcon	2:12.9330
19	49	(Australia) Steve Owen	Paul Morris Motorsport	Ford FG Falcon	2:13.0090
20	66	(Australia) Russell Ingall	Walkinshaw Racing	Holden VE Commodore	2:13.1840
21	8	(Australia) Jason Bright	Brad Jones Racing	Holden VE Commodore	2:13.2800
22	17	(Australia) Steven Johnson	Dick Johnson Racing	Ford FG Falcon	2:13.4570
23	11	(Australia) Karl Reindler	Kelly Racing	Holden VE Commodore	2:13.5450
24	12	(Australia) Dean Fiore	Triple F Racing	Ford FG Falcon	2:13.6880
25	21	(Australia) David Wall	Britek Motorsport	Holden VE Commodore	2:13.8880
26	30	(Australia) Taz Douglas	Lucas Dumbrell Motorsport	Holden VE Commodore	2:14.4450
27	7	(Australia) Tim Blanchard	Kelly Racing	Holden VE Commodore	2:14.4590
28	51	(New Zealand) Greg Murphy	Kelly Racing	Holden VE Commodore	2:14.4450

==== Race ====
Pos	No	Name	Team	Laps	Time/Retired	Grid
1	1	(Australia) Jamie Whincup	Triple Eight Race Engineering	12	27min 05.2950sec	2
2	6	(Australia) Will Davison	Ford Performance Racing	12	+ 4.100 s	1
3	9	(New Zealand) Shane van Gisbergen	Stone Brothers Racing	12	+ 9.211 s	3
4	47	(Australia) Tim Slade	James Rosenberg Racing	12	+ 10.634 s	4
5	4	(Australia) Lee Holdsworth	Stone Brothers Racing	12	+ 13.627 s	5
6	5	(Australia) Mark Winterbottom	Ford Performance Racing	12	+ 14.898 s	7
7	2	(Australia) Garth Tander	Holden Racing Team	12	+ 15.827 s	6
8	888	(Australia) Craig Lowndes	Triple Eight Race Engineering	12	+ 17.851 s	9
9	18	(Australia) James Moffat	Dick Johnson Racing	12	+ 20.255 s	14
10	19	(Australia) Jonathon Webb	Tekno Autosports	12	+ 24.118 s	8
11	14	(New Zealand) Fabian Coulthard	Brad Jones Racing	12	+ 24.339 s	12
12	91	(Australia) Michael Patrizi	Tekno Autosports	12	+ 26.390 s	13
13	55	(Australia) David Reynolds	Rod Nash Racing	12	+ 26.441 s	11
14	3	(Australia) Tony D'Alberto	Tony D'Alberto Racing	12	+ 26.708 s	18
15	17	(Australia) Steven Johnson	Dick Johnson Racing	12	+ 30.000 s	22
16	34	(Australia) Michael Caruso	Garry Rogers Motorsport	12	+ 32.897 s	15
17	12	(Australia) Dean Fiore	Triple F Racing	12	+ 36.504 s	24
18	66	(Australia) Russell Ingall	Walkinshaw Racing	12	+ 39.070 s	20
19	8	(Australia) Jason Bright	Brad Jones Racing	12	+ 41.733 s	21
20	33	(France) Alexandre Premat	Garry Rogers Motorsport	12	+ 42.724 s	16
21	11	(Australia) Karl Reindler	Kelly Racing	12	+ 43.193 s	23
22	21	(Australia) David Wall	Britek Motorsport	12	+ 45.981 s	25
23	49	(Australia) Steve Owen	Paul Morris Motorsport	12	+ 49.079 s	19
24	7	(Australia) Tim Blanchard	Kelly Racing	12	+ 50.487 s	27
25	51	(New Zealand) Greg Murphy	Kelly Racing	12	+ 52.065 s	28
26	30	(Australia) Taz Douglas	Lucas Dumbrell Motorsport	12	+ 52.683 s	26
27	15	(Australia) Rick Kelly	Kelly Racing	9	+ 3 laps	17
Ret	22	(Australia) James Courtney	Holden Racing Team	1	Retired	10
Fastest lap: Jamie Whincup (Triple Eight Race Engineering), 2:14.6090

== Standings ==
- After 26 of 30 races.

Pos	No	Name	Team	Points
1	1	(Australia) Jamie Whincup	Triple Eight Race Engineering	3360
2	5	(Australia) Mark Winterbottom	Ford Performance Racing	3064
3	888	(Australia) Craig Lowndes	Triple Eight Race Engineering	2971
4	6	(Australia) Will Davison	Ford Performance Racing	2779
5	9	(New Zealand) Shane van Gisbergen	Stone Brothers Racing	2434
