= 2012 Sydney Motorsport Park 360 =

2012 V8 Supercar championship race

(New South Wales) 2012 Sydney Motorsport Park 360
Event Information
- Round 9 of 15 in the 2012 International V8 Supercars Championship
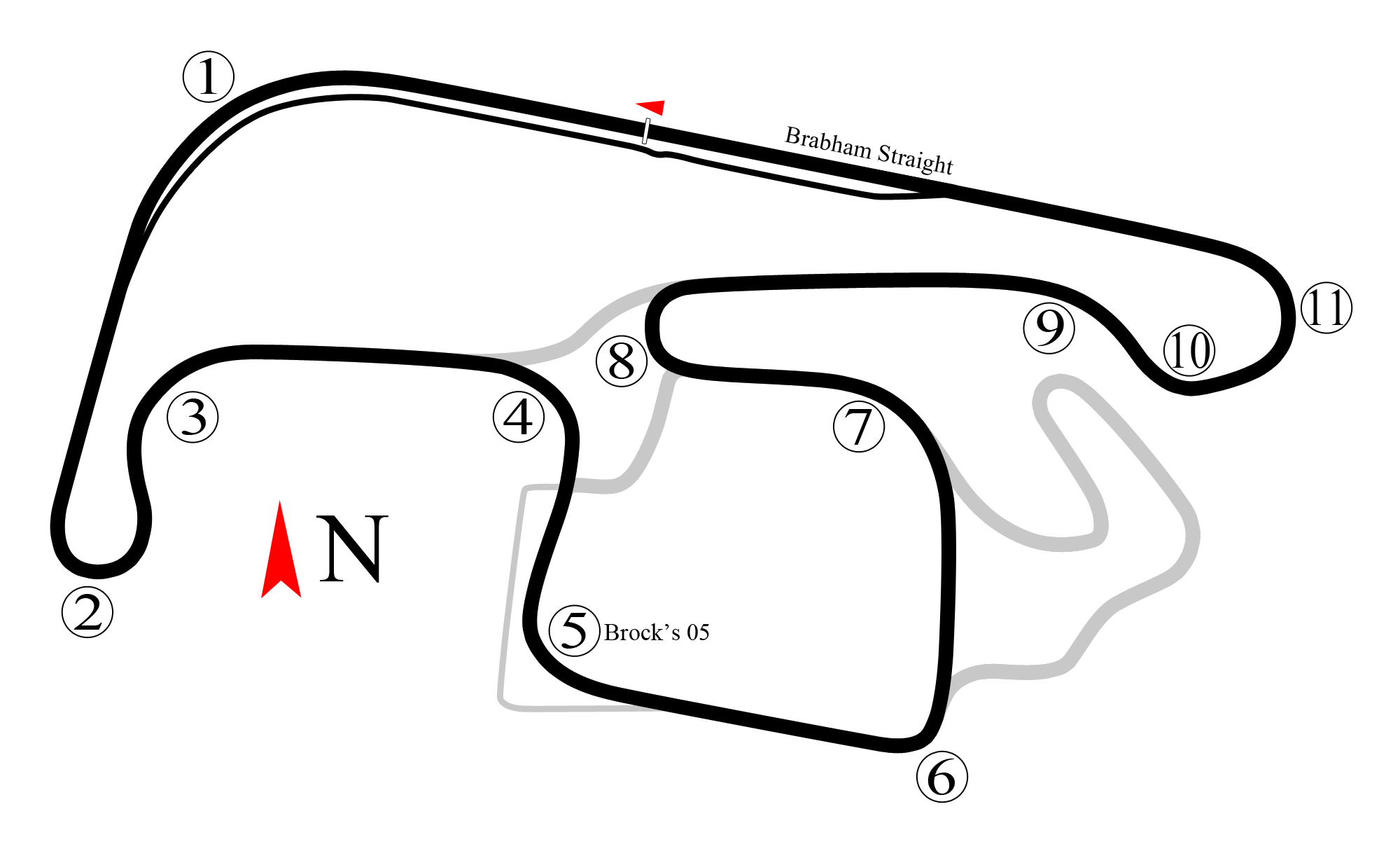
- Date: 25–26 August 2012
- Location: Eastern Creek, New South Wales
- Venue: Sydney Motorsport Park
- Weather: Fine

Results
Race 1
Distance	36 laps	140 km
Pole position	Jamie Whincup; Triple Eight Race Engineering	1:29.6353
Winner	Craig Lowndes; Triple Eight Race Engineering	56:17.3122
Race 2
Distance	56 laps	220 km
Pole position	Craig Lowndes; Triple Eight Race Engineering	1:29.2493
Winner	Jamie Whincup; Triple Eight Race Engineering	1:27:43.9374

The 2012 Sydney Motorsport Park 360 was a motor race for the Australian sedan-based V8 Supercars. It was the ninth event of the 2012 International V8 Supercars Championship. It was held on the weekend of 25–26 August at the Sydney Motorsport Park, in Eastern Creek, New South Wales.

It was the first V8 Supercars event held at the circuit since 2008, when the circuit was known as Eastern Creek Raceway. The V8 Supercars used the traditional 3.93 km Gardner Circuit as opposed to the new 4.7 km Brabham Circuit. It was also the first of three events held in New South Wales and the last before the endurance races (the Sandown 500, Bathurst 1000 and Gold Coast 600).

== Standings ==
- After 19 of 30 races.

Pos	No	Name	Team	Points
1	1	Jamie Whincup	Triple Eight Race Engineering	2238
2	5	Mark Winterbottom	Ford Performance Racing	2237
3	6	Will Davison	Ford Performance Racing	2116
4	888	Craig Lowndes	Triple Eight Race Engineering	2084
5	9	Shane van Gisbergen	Stone Brothers Racing	1634
