= 2012 Trading Post Perth Challenge =

2012 V8 Supercar championship race

(Western Australia) 2012 Trading Post Perth Challenge
Event Information
- Round 4 of 15 in the 2012 International V8 Supercars Championship
- Date: 4–6 May 2012
- Location: Perth, Western Australia
- Venue: Barbagallo Raceway
- Weather: Partly cloudy, occasional light drizzle

Results
Race 1
Distance	50 laps	120 km
Pole position	Garth Tander; Holden Racing Team	1:02:1974
Winner	Mark Winterbottom; Ford Performance Racing	52:48:8024
Race 2
Distance	50 laps	120 km
Pole position	Jamie Whincup; Triple Eight Race Engineering	56:3260
Winner	Will Davison; Ford Performance Racing	49:02:2171
Race 3
Distance	50 laps	120 km
Pole position	Jamie Whincup; Triple Eight Race Engineering	55:2889
Winner	Will Davison; Ford Performance Racing	50:38:3093

The 2012 Trading Post Perth Challenge was a motor racing event for the Australian sedan-based V8 Supercars. It was the fourth event of the 2012 International V8 Supercars Championship, featuring Races 7, 8 & 9. The unusual three race format is a staple of the Barbagallo Raceway event, in part caused by the different time zone of Western Australia compared to eastern states. It was held on the weekend of 4–6 May at the Barbagallo Raceway, in Perth, Western Australia. It was also the first time the series utilised the new pitlane on the infield of the circuit as opposed to the original one on the outside of the circuit.

The meeting saw a clean sweep of race wins by the Ford Performance Racing team. Mark Winterbottom won Saturday's Race 5 of the championship, while Sunday's two races were both won by Will Davison, the third and final race saw Davison on tyres no longer capable of sustaining front running speed being caught rapidly by Winterbottom and Jamie Whincup of the Triple Eight Race Engineering team. Davison won as his team-mate Winterbottom snuck past Whincup on the last lap to defuse the hostile challenge from the Holden driver.

== Standings ==
- After 9 of 30 races.

Pos	No	Name	Team	Points
1	1	Jamie Whincup	Triple Eight Race Engineering	1095
2	6	Will Davison	Ford Performance Racing	1066
3	5	Mark Winterbottom	Ford Performance Racing	935
4	888	Craig Lowndes	Triple Eight Race Engineering	779
5	4	Lee Holdsworth	Stone Brothers Racing	737
