= 2012 Skycity Triple Crown =

2012 V8 Supercar championship race

(Northern Territory) 2012 Skycity Triple Crown
Event Information
- Round 6 of 15 in the 2012 International V8 Supercars Championship
- Date: 15–17 June 2012
- Location: Darwin, Northern Territory
- Venue: Hidden Valley Raceway
- Weather: Fine

Results
Race 1
Distance	42 laps	120 km
Pole position	Will Davison; Ford Performance Racing	1:08:6664
Winner	Jamie Whincup; Triple Eight Race Engineering	52:26:0743
Race 2
Distance	69 laps	200 km
Pole position	Will Davison; Ford Performance Racing	1:08:5004
Winner	Craig Lowndes; Triple Eight Race Engineering	1:29:04:4833

The 2012 Skycity Triple Crown was an Australian touring car motor race for V8 Supercars. It was held from the 15–17 June at the Hidden Valley Raceway in Darwin and was the sixth round of the 2012 International V8 Supercars Championship and the fifteenth time that the Supercars had visited Hidden Valley since the first event in 1998.

The weekend consisted of two races with Jamie Whincup from Triple Eight Race Engineering winning the first race of the weekend while fellow team-mate Craig Lowndes won the longer race of the two during the weekend.

== Standings ==
- After 13 of 30 races.

Pos	No	Name	Team	Points
1	1	Jamie Whincup	Triple Eight Race Engineering	1494
2	6	Will Davison	Ford Performance Racing	1456
3	5	Mark Winterbottom	Ford Performance Racing	1445
4	888	Craig Lowndes	Triple Eight Race Engineering	1247
5	9	Shane van Gisbergen	Stone Brothers Racing	1145
