= Alex Davison =

Australian racing driver

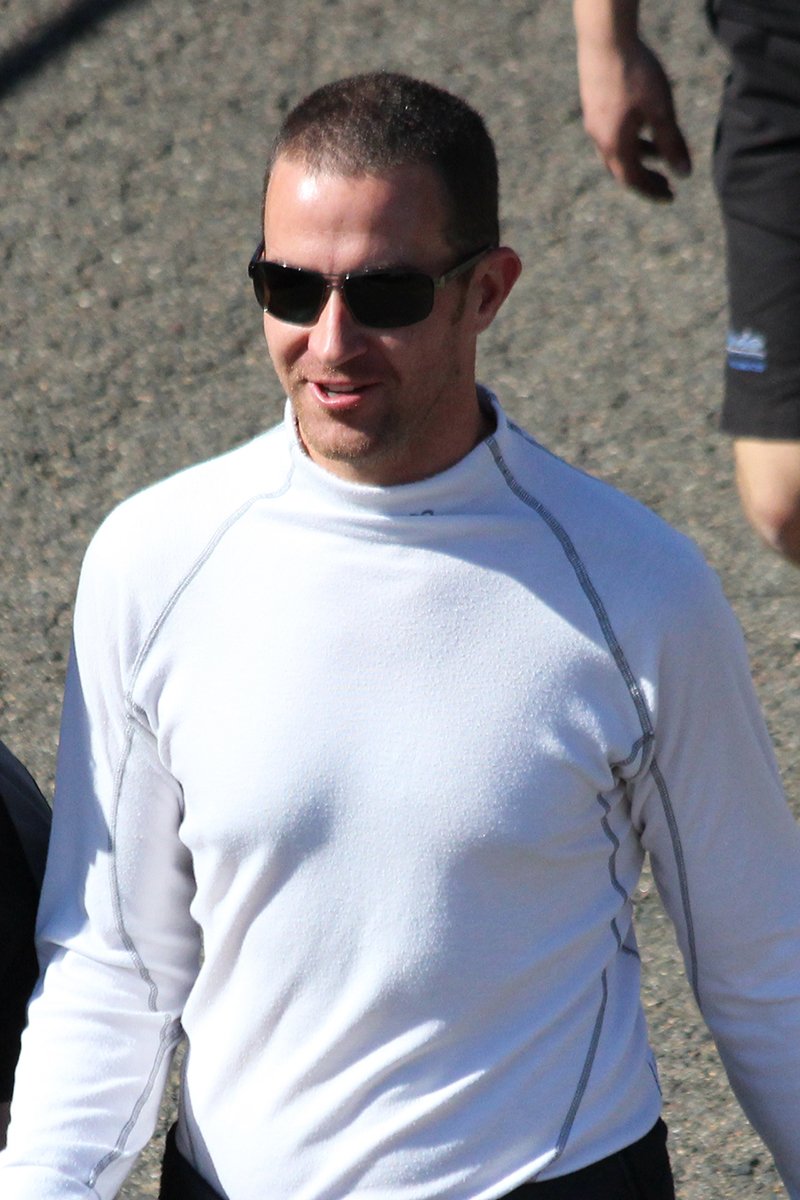
- Davison in 2016
- Nationality: Australian
- Born: 3 November 1979 (age 47) Melbourne, Victoria
- Relatives: Lex Davison (grandfather); Will Davison (brother); James Davison (cousin)
- Categorisation: FIA Gold (until 2015, 2017); FIA Silver (2016, 2018–)

Supercars Championship career
- Current team: Dick Johnson Racing (Endurance race co-driver)
- Championships: 0
- Races: 166
- Wins: 0
- Podiums: 3
- Pole positions: 1
- 2020 position: 23rd (794 pts)

Alexander Davison (born 3 November 1979) is a racing driver from Australia. He was the 2004 Porsche Carrera Cup Australia champion.

== Junior career ==
Starting in karts at a young age, Davison progressed to Formula Ford in 1998 racing a used 1995 Van Diemen RF95. With sponsorship from Wynn's and OAMPS Insurance, Davison upgraded to a year old Van Diemen RF98 for 1999, and finished third in one of the most competitive Australian Formula Ford seasons behind champion Greg Ritter. He had tied on points with Steve Owen in second, but on a countback of race wins, lost second place to Owen, who had five wins to Davison's four. After two years of Formula Ford, Davison's eyes turned to Europe.

== Sports cars ==
=== Manthey Racing ===
Unable to break into an open-wheel series, Davison found a role with German Sports Car team Manthey Racing. After initially racing Porsche Carrera Cup in the German national series, Davison was promoted to the Porsche Supercup, a pan-European series supporting several legs of the Formula 1 World Drivers' Championship and finished sixth, including one victory at Indianapolis. Two more years with Manthey in the German series saw no significant improvement and Davison returned home to Australia during 2003.

=== Return to Australia ===
Back in Australia, Davison made some appearances in the 2003 Australian Carrera Cup Championship. After breaking through for a round win at the end of 2003, Davison dominated the 2004 Australian Carrera Cup Championship, taking his first and only major championship title to date. Despite having competed in selected V8 Supercars events in 2004 and 2005, Davison was unable to find a full-time role in V8 Supercars, and returned to the Australian Carrera Cup in 2006, joining Paul Cruickshank Racing. He took the seat of outgoing champion Fabian Coulthard and finished second to Craig Baird in the 2006 season. Into 2007, Davison took over the seat Jim Richards vacated from his own team, as Richards concentrated on other series. Davison again finished runner-up this time to David Reynolds.

=== Le Mans Series ===
In 2008, an opportunity to return to Europe beckoned and Davison took up a drive with Team Felbermayr-Proton in the 2008 Le Mans Series season. Despite not winning a single race, Davison and co-driver Marc Lieb finished runner-up in the GT2 class in their Porsche 997 GT3-RSR behind Ferrari F430 GT2 driver Rob Bell. With the same team, Davison also contested the 2008 edition of the 24 Hours of Le Mans, driving with Horst Felbermayr, Sr. and Wolf Henzler. They finished fifth in class. Some guest drives in the American Le Mans Series also cropped up, though to no significant success.

Alex Davison won the Porsche Cup, an annual award presented by Porsche AG to recognize the world's most successful privateer racing driver competing with Porsche machinery in a customer racing team, in 2008.

=== Carrera Cup comebacks ===
In 2012, Davison drove the Simjen 'Silver Bullet' in a return to Australian Carrera Cup. Davison won the first round of the season at the Adelaide Street Circuit before eventually finishing third in the championship.

In 2016, Davison once again entered the Australian Carrera Cup Championship full-time, winning two of the first four rounds at Albert Park and Hidden Valley Raceway.

== Touring cars ==
=== Perkins Motorsport ===
Davison's Carrera Cup form led to him join the Perkins Motorsport V8 Supercars team for the 2004 endurance races, sharing Tony Longhurst's regular season car with Jamie Whincup. The pair finished a creditable ninth at the 2004 running of the Bathurst 1000. Davison later replaced Longhurst for the final two sprint events of the year when the veteran left the team. This in turn led to a full-time seat with Perkins in 2005 but with results not forthcoming Davison too found himself replaced before season's end.

=== Stone Brothers Racing ===
Having returned from his European racing exploits, Davison returned to a full-time V8 Supercar seat with Stone Brothers Racing in 2009. The year was largely disappointing, and he finished the year 17th in the standings, with the highlight being a second-place finish at Hidden Valley thanks to a favourable soft tyre strategy. 2010 saw Davison fail to improve, with a ninth-place finish in the opening race of the season at the Clipsal 500 becoming one of only three top ten finishes for the year. He did, however, achieve his maiden pole position on his return to Hidden Valley, but a potential podium finish was scuppered by an electrical failure. Davison improved to finish 11th in the 2011 season, including his second career podium at the opening race of the year at the Yas Marina Circuit in Abu Dhabi. Despite his better season, Davison was replaced by Lee Holdsworth for 2012.

=== Team 18 ===
After spending 2012 in Carrera Cup, Davison was recalled to V8 Supercars in 2013 to drive for Team 18, a newly formed satellite team operating with Ford Performance Racing equipment. Davison had an above average season, finishing 13th overall, peaking with a third place at the Phillip Island event.

=== Endurance co-driver ===
Davison has competed in V8 Supercars as an endurance co-driver on several occasions. In 2006, 2007 and 2012, he raced with Dick Johnson Racing while in 2008 he raced for Paul Cruickshank Racing. On all four occasions, he achieved top ten results at the Bathurst 1000. In 2014 and 2015, Davison entered the endurance races, now combined to form the Enduro Cup, with Erebus Motorsport, who ironically had bought out his former team Stone Brothers Racing. This provided Davison with the opportunity to co-drive with his brother Will Davison and included a fourth-place finish at the 2014 Bathurst 1000. Davison also entered the final sprint round of the 2015 season, the Sydney 500, for Erebus Motorsport as a replacement for Ashley Walsh.

After James Courtney's departure from Team Sydney by Tekno, Davison was drafted in by Jonathon Webb to drive the No. 19 Local Legends Holden ZB Commodore from the Eastern Creek Round onwards. He partnered Chris Pither (#22). Davison did not remain in his drive for 2021, instead moving to Dick Johnson Racing as a co-driver for his brother Will. He would continue in this role until 2023, where he was replaced by Tony D'Alberto.

== Personal life ==
Davison is the son of Australian Formula 2 champion Richard Davison, grandson of four times Australian Grand Prix winner Lex Davison and brother to Will Davison. His uncle Jon Davison, and cousins James Davison and Charlie Davison also are linked with the sport. He has two children Luke Davison and Lily Davison and has been married to Melanie Davison since 2010.

== Career results ==
=== Karting career summary ===
Season	Series	Position
1994	Victorian Junior Karter of the Year award	**1st**
1995	Victorian Junior Kart Championship	**1st**

=== Circuit racing career summary ===
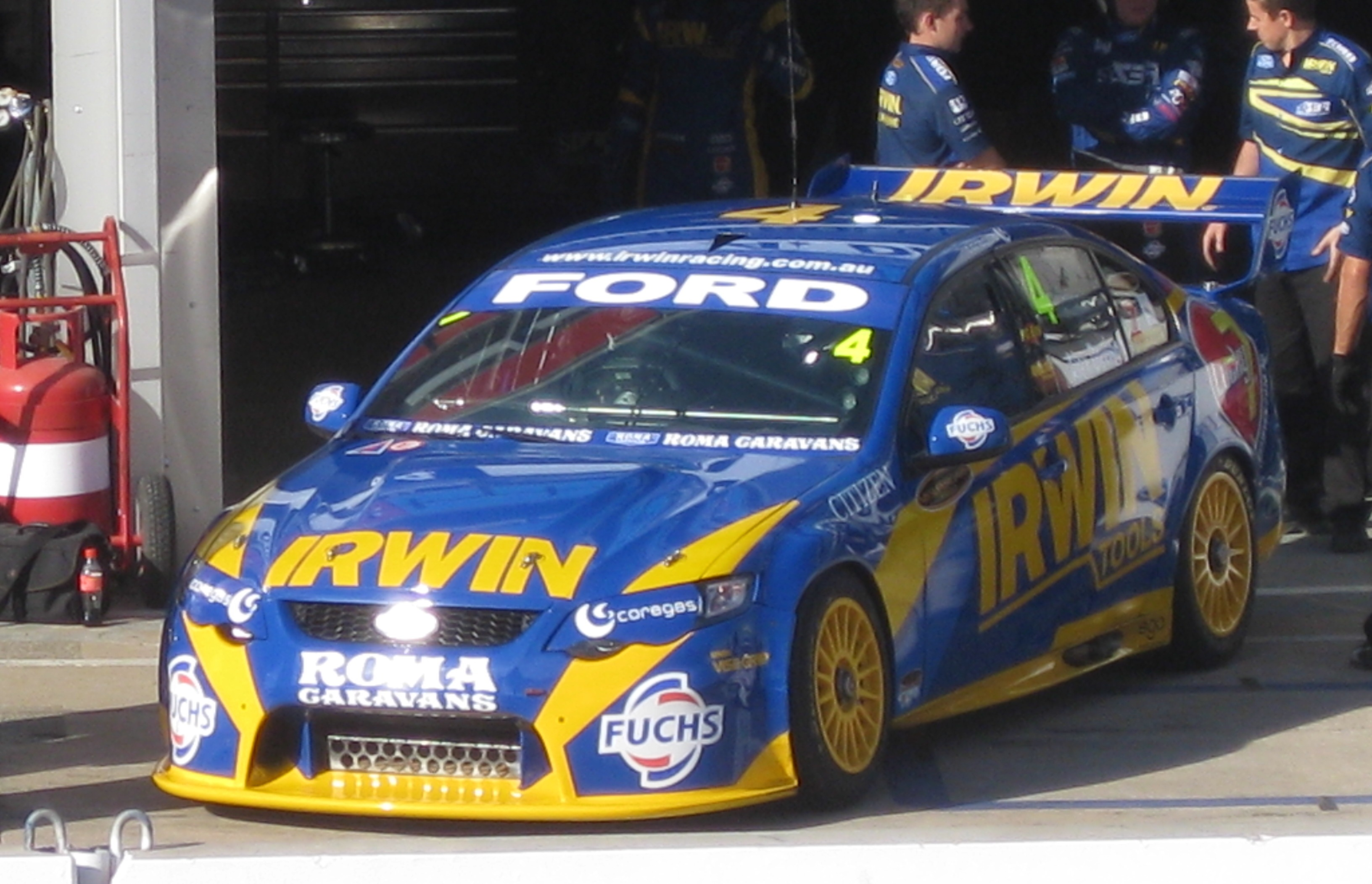
The Ford FG Falcon of Alex Davison at the 2010 Clipsal 500 Adelaide

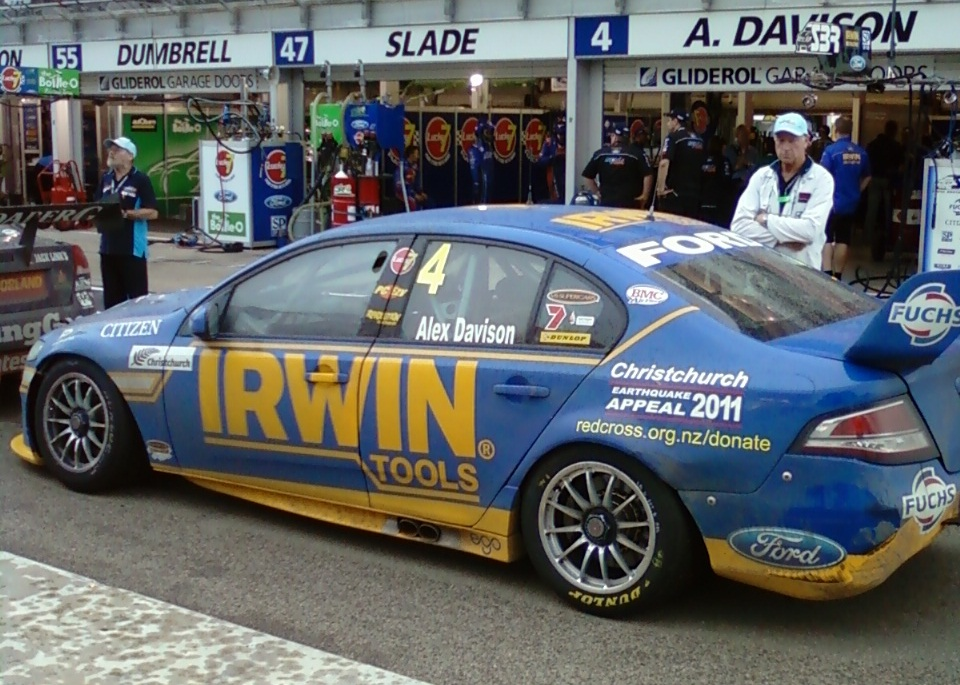
The Ford FG Falcon of Alex Davison at the 2011 Clipsal 500 Adelaide

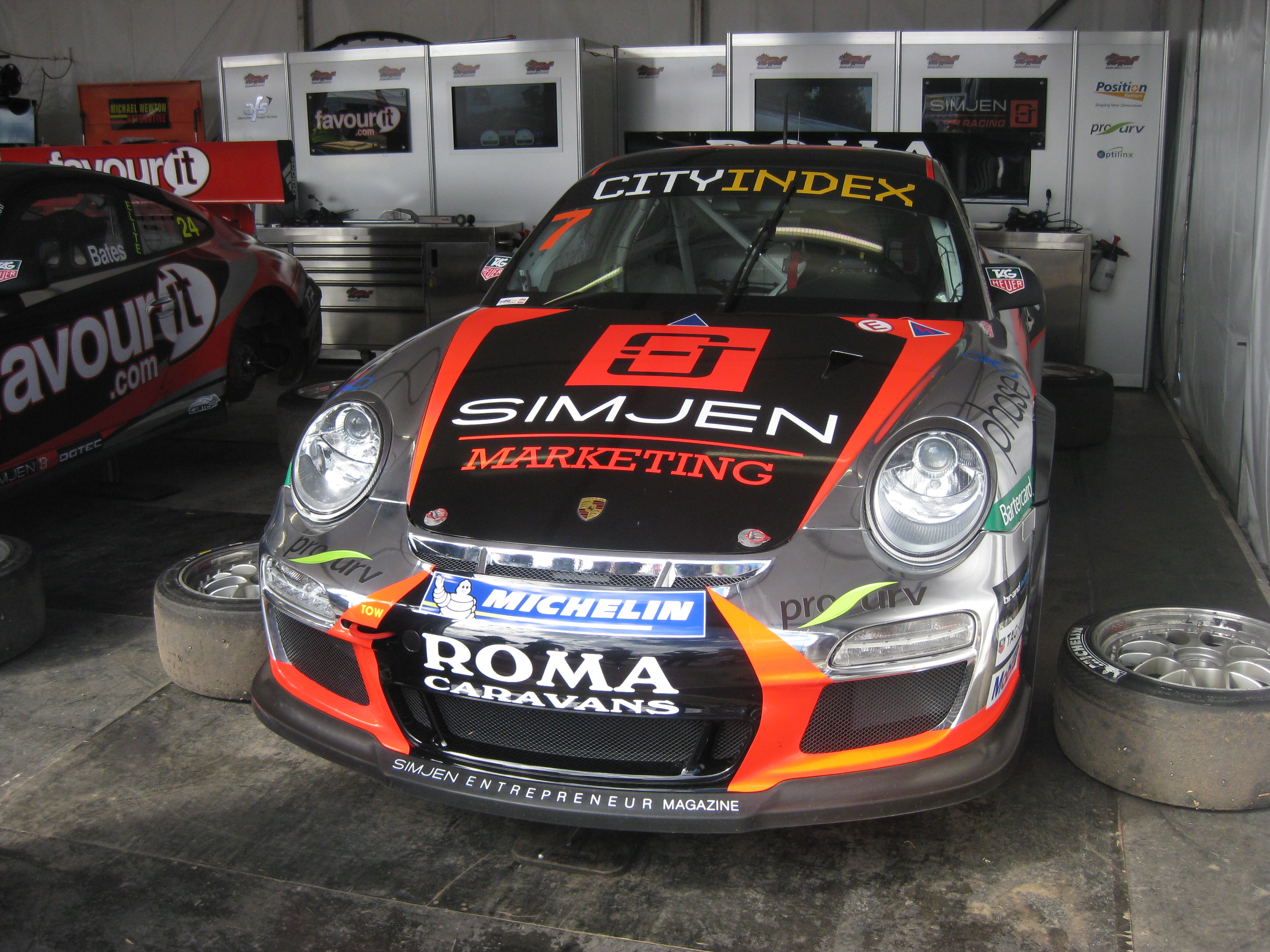
Davison contested the 2012 Australian Carrera Cup Championship in this Roma Caravans entry

Season	Series	Position	Car	Team
1998	Australian Formula Ford Championship	7th	Van Diemen RF95 Ford	Richard Davison
1999	Australian Formula Ford Championship	**3rd**	Van Diemen RF98 Ford	Richard Davison
1999	Formula Ford Festival	13th	Van Diemen RF9 Ford	Mick Gardner Racing
2000	Porsche Carrera Cup Germany	10th	Porsche 996 GT3 Cup	PZM Team Valier
2001	Porsche Carrera Cup Germany	6th	Porsche 996 GT3 Cup	Manthey Racing
2002	Porsche Supercup	6th	Porsche 996 GT3 Cup	Manthey Racing
2002	Porsche Carrera Cup Germany	8th	Porsche 996 GT3 Cup	Manthey Racing
2003	Porsche Carrera Cup Germany	5th	Porsche 996 GT3 Cup	Manthey Racing
2004	Australian Carrera Cup Championship	**1st**	Porsche 996 GT3 Cup	Greg Murphy Racing
2004	Konica Minolta V8 Supercar Series	36th	Holden VX Commodore	Perkins Engineering
2004	V8 Supercar Championship Series	38th	Holden VX Commodore	Perkins Engineering
2005	V8 Supercar Championship Series	33rd	Holden VY Commodore	Perkins Engineering
2006	Australian Carrera Cup Championship	**2nd**	Porsche 997 GT3 Cup	Paul Cruickshank Racing
2006	V8 Supercar Championship Series	42nd	Ford BA Falcon	Dick Johnson Racing
2007	Australian Carrera Cup Championship	**2nd**	Porsche 997 GT3 Cup	Jim Richards Racing
2007	V8 Supercar Championship Series	36th	Ford BF Falcon	Dick Johnson Racing
2008	Le Mans Series GT2 Class	**2nd**	Porsche 997 GT3 RSR	Team Felbermayr-Proton
2008	American Le Mans Series GT2 Class	26th	Porsche 997 GT3 RSR	Flying Lizard Motorsports; Farnbacher-Loles Motorsport
2008	Sepang 12 Hours	**1st**	Porsche 997 GT3 RSR	Team Porsche Club Singapore
2009	V8 Supercar Championship Series	17th	Ford FG Falcon	Stone Brothers Racing
2010	V8 Supercar Championship Series	21st	Ford FG Falcon	Stone Brothers Racing
2011	International V8 Supercars Championship	11th	Ford FG Falcon	Stone Brothers Racing
2012	Australian Carrera Cup Championship	**3rd**	Porsche 997 GT3 Cup	McElrea Racing
2012	V8SuperTourer Championship	50th	Ford FG Falcon	International Motorsport
2012	International V8 Supercars Championship	42nd	Ford FG Falcon	Dick Johnson Racing
2013	V8SuperTourers Championship	18th	Ford FG Falcon	MPC Motorsport
2013	International V8 Supercars Championship	13th	Ford FG Falcon	Charlie Schwerkolt Racing
2014	International V8 Supercars Championship	37th	Mercedes-Benz E63 AMG	Erebus Motorsport
2015	International V8 Supercars Championship	37th	Mercedes-Benz E63 AMG	Erebus Motorsport
2016	Australian Carrera Cup Championship	**2nd**	Porsche 911 GT3 Cup	Buik Motorsport
2017	Supercars Championship	49th	Holden VF Commodore	Lucas Dumbrell Motorsport
2018	Supercars Championship	40th	Ford FG X Falcon	23Red Racing
2018	European Le Mans Series - LMGTE	7th	Porsche 911 RSR	Gulf Racing UK
2018–19	FIA World Endurance Championship - LMGTE	17th	Porsche 911 RSR	Gulf Racing UK
2019	Supercars Championship	32nd	Ford Mustang GT	23Red Racing
2020	Supercars Championship	23rd	Holden ZB Commodore	Team Sydney by Tekno
2021	Supercars Championship	36th	Ford Mustang GT	Dick Johnson Racing
2023	Porsche Carrera Cup Australia	8th	Porsche 911 GT3 Cup 992	Scott Taylor Motorsport
2023	Supercars Championship	35th	Ford Mustang GT	Dick Johnson Racing

=== Porsche Supercup results ===
(key) (Races in bold indicate pole position) (Races in italics indicate fastest lap)

Year	Team	1	2	3	4	5	6	7	8	9	10	11	12	DC	Points
2001	HP Racing Team	ITA1	ESP	AUT	MON	GER1; 5	GBR	GER2						NC	0
2001	Carlin								HUN; 5	BEL	ITA2	USA1	USA2	NC	0
2002	Manthey Racing	ITA1; 19	ESP; DNS	AUT; Ret	MON; 9	GER1; Ret	GBR; 4	GER2; 7	HUN; 2	BEL; 6	ITA2; 2	USA1; 1	USA2; 3	6th	117
2003	Walter Lechner Racing	ITA1	ESP; 6	AUT	MON	GER1	GBR	GER2	HUN	BEL	ITA2	USA1	USA2	NC	0

=== Super2 Series results ===
(Races in bold indicate pole position) (Races in italics indicate fastest lap)

Super2 Series results
Year	Team	No.	Car	1	2	3	4	5	6	7	8	9	10	11	12	13	14	15	16	17	Position	Points
2004	Perkins Engineering	70	Holden VX Commodore	WAK; R1	WAK; R2	WAK; R3	ADE; R4	ADE; R5	WIN; R6	WIN; R7	WIN; R8	EAS; R9	EAS; R10	EAS; R11	QLD; R12	QLD; R13	QLD; R14	MAL; R15; 7	MAL; R16; 9	MAL; R17; Ret	36th	100

=== Supercars Championship results ===
(Races in bold indicate pole position) (Races in italics indicate fastest lap)

Supercars results
Year	Team	No.	Car	1	2	3	4	5	6	7	8	9	10	11	12	13	14	15	16	17	18	19	20	21	22	23	24	25	26	27	28	29	30	31	32	33	34	35	36	37	38	39	Position	Points
2004	Rod Nash Racing	7	Holden VX Commodore	ADE; R1	ADE; R2	EAS; R3	PUK; R4	PUK; R5	PUK; R6	HDV; R7	HDV; R8	HDV; R9	BAR; R10	BAR; R11	BAR; R12	QLD; R13	WIN; R14	ORA; R15	ORA; R16	SAN; R17; Ret	BAT; R18; 9	SUR; R19	SUR; R20	SYM; R21; 20	SYM; R22; 20	SYM; R23; Ret																	38th	256
2004	Rod Nash Racing	7	Holden VY Commodore																								EAS; R24; 23	EAS; R25; 27	EAS; R26; 27														38th	256
2005	Rod Nash Racing	7	Holden VY Commodore	ADE; R1; Ret	ADE; R2; 21	PUK; R3	PUK; R4	PUK; R5	BAR; R6	BAR; R7	BAR; R8																																33rd	469
2005	Rod Nash Racing	7	Holden VZ Commodore									EAS; R9; 29	EAS; R10; 25	SHA; R11	SHA; R12	SHA; R13	HDV; R14; 23	HDV; R15; 17	HDV; R16; Ret	QLD; R17; Ret	ORA; R18; 21	ORA; R19; 23	SAN; R20; 17	BAT; R21; 20	SUR; R22; Ret	SUR; R23; 24	SUR; R24; 23	SYM; R25	SYM; R26	SYM; R27	PHI; R28	PHI; R29	PHI; R30										33rd	469
2006	Dick Johnson Racing	18	Ford BA Falcon	ADE; R1	ADE; R2	PUK; R3	PUK; R4	PUK; R5	BAR; R6	BAR; R7	BAR; R8	WIN; R9	WIN; R10	WIN; R11	HDV; R12	HDV; R13	HDV; R14	QLD; R15	QLD; R16	QLD; R17	ORA; R18	ORA; R19	ORA; R20	SAN; R21; 14	BAT; R22; 9	SUR; R23	SUR; R24	SUR; R25	SYM; R26	SYM; R27	SYM; R28	BHR; R29	BHR; R30	BHR; R31	PHI; R32	PHI; R33	PHI; R34						42nd	240
2007	Dick Johnson Racing	18	Ford BF Falcon	ADE; R1	ADE; R2	BAR; R3	BAR; R4	BAR; R5	PUK; R6	PUK; R7	PUK; R8	WIN; R9	WIN; R10	WIN; R11	EAS; R12	EAS; R13	EAS; R14	HDV; R15	HDV; R16	HDV; R17	QLD; R18	QLD; R19	QLD; R20	ORA; R21	ORA; R22	ORA; R23	SAN; R24; Ret	BAT; R25; 8	SUR; R26	SUR; R27	SUR; R28	BHR; R29	BHR; R30	BHR; R31	SYM; R32	SYM; R33	SYM; R34	PHI; R35	PHI; R36	PHI; R37			36th	30
2008	Paul Cruickshank Racing	111	Ford BF Falcon	ADE; R1	ADE; R2	EAS; R3	EAS; R4	EAS; R5	HAM; R6	HAM; R7	HAM; R8	BAR; R9	BAR; R10	BAR; R11	SAN; R12	SAN; R13	SAN; R14	HDV; R15	HDV; R16	HDV; R17	QLD; R18	QLD; R19	QLD; R20	WIN; R21	WIN; R22	WIN; R23	PHI; QR	PHI; R24	BAT; R25; 10	SUR; R26	SUR; R27	SUR; R28	BHR; R29	BHR; R30	BHR; R31	SYM; R32	SYM; R33	SYM; R34	ORA; R35	ORA; R36	ORA; R37		49th	156
2009	Stone Brothers Racing	4	Ford FG Falcon	ADE; R1; 15	ADE; R2; 25	HAM; R3; 9	HAM; R4; 10	WIN; R5; 21	WIN; R6; 15	SYM; R7; 17	SYM; R8; 11	HDV; R9; 19	HDV; R10; 2	TOW; R11; Ret	TOW; R12; Ret	SAN; R13; 16	SAN; R14; 21	QLD; R15; 13	QLD; R16; 19	PHI; QR; 20	PHI; R17; 10	BAT; R18; 13	SUR; R19; 16	SUR; R20; 17	SUR; R21; 16	SUR; R22; 17	PHI; R23; 11	PHI; R24; 12	BAR; R25; 17	BAR; R26; 21	SYD; R27; 20	SYD; R28; 9											17th	1648
2010	Stone Brothers Racing	4	Ford FG Falcon	YMC; R1; 9	YMC; R2; 27	BHR; R3; 18	BHR; R4; 17	ADE; R5; 11	ADE; R6; 23	HAM; R7; 17	HAM; R8; Ret	QLD; R9; 28	QLD; R10; 21	WIN; R11; 16	WIN; R12; 17	HDV; R13; 15	**HDV**; **R14**; Ret	TOW; R15; 13	TOW; R16; 14	PHI; QR; 19	PHI; R17; 10	BAT; R18; 13	SUR; R19; 5	SUR; R20; Ret	SYM; R21; 20	SYM; R22; 19	SAN; R23; 15	SAN; R24; 21	SYD; R25; Ret	SYD; R26; 23													21st	1317
2011	Stone Brothers Racing	4	Ford FG Falcon	YMC; R1; 2	YMC; R2; 7	ADE; R3; 23	ADE; R4; 10	HAM; R5; 10	HAM; R6; 7	BAR; R7; 21	BAR; R8; 6	BAR; R9; 11	WIN; R10; 6	WIN; R11; 16	HID; R12; 19	HID; R13; 8	TOW; R14; 26	TOW; R15; 4	QLD; R16; 12	QLD; R17; 22	QLD; R18; 8	PHI; QR; Ret	PHI; R19; 22	BAT; R20; 16	SUR; R21; 23	SUR; R22; 18	SYM; R23; 6	SYM; R24; 26	SAN; R25; 16	SAN; R26; 15	SYD; R27; 12	SYD; R28; Ret											11th	1850
2012	Dick Johnson Racing	18	Ford FG Falcon	ADE; R1	ADE; R2	SYM; R3	SYM; R4	HAM; R5	HAM; R6	BAR; R7	BAR; R8	BAR; R9	PHI; R10	PHI; R11	HID; R12	HID; R13	TOW; R14	TOW; R15	QLD; R16	QLD; R17	SMP; R18	SMP; R19	SAN; QR; 10	SAN; R20; 26	BAT; R21; 10	SUR; R22	SUR; R23	YMC; R24	YMC; R25	YMC; R26	WIN; R27	WIN; R28	SYD; R29	SYD; R30									42nd	242
2013	Charlie Schwerkolt Racing	18	Ford FG Falcon	ADE; R1; 9	ADE; R2; Ret	SYM; R3; 13	SYM; R4; 15	SYM; R5; 12	PUK; R6; 11	PUK; R7; 5	PUK; R8; 9	PUK; R9; 7	BAR; R10; 5	BAR; R11; 9	BAR; R12; 16	COA; R13; 14	COA; R14; 17	COA; R15; 18	COA; R16; 26	HID; R17; 20	HID; R18; 20	HID; R19; Ret	TOW; R20; 9	TOW; R21; 18	QLD; R22; 9	QLD; R23; 7	QLD; R24; 22	WIN; R25; 15	WIN; R26; 18	WIN; R27; 12	SAN; QR; Ret	SAN; R28; 15	BAT; R29; 13	SUR; R30; 20	SUR; R31; 13	PHI; R32; 3	PHI; R33; 6	PHI; R34; 9	SYD; R35; 12	SYD; R36; 8			13th	1812
2014	Erebus Motorsport	9	Mercedes-Benz E63 AMG	ADE; R1	ADE; R2	ADE; R3	SYM; R4	SYM; R5	SYM; R6	WIN; R7	WIN; R8	WIN; R9	PUK; R10	PUK; R11	PUK; R12	PUK; R13	BAR; R14	BAR; R15	BAR; R16	HID; R17	HID; R18	HID; R19	TOW; R20	TOW; R21	TOW; R22	QLD; R23	QLD; R24	QLD; R25	SMP; R26	SMP; R27	SMP; R28	SAN; QR; 16	SAN; R29; 21	BAT; R30; 4	SUR; R31; 20	SUR; R32; 20	PHI; R33	PHI; R34	PHI; R35	SYD; R36	SYD; R37	SYD; R38	37th	414
2015	Erebus Motorsport	9	Mercedes-Benz E63 AMG	ADE; R1	ADE; R2	ADE; R3	SYM; R4	SYM; R5	SYM; R6	BAR; R7	BAR; R8	BAR; R9	WIN; R10	WIN; R11	WIN; R12	HID; R13	HID; R14	HID; R15	TOW; R16	TOW; R17	QLD; R18	QLD; R19	QLD; R20	SMP; R21	SMP; R22	SMP; R23	SAN; QR; 13	SAN; R24; 23	BAT; R25; 12	SUR; R26; 15	SUR; R27; 16	PUK; R28	PUK; R29	PUK; R30	PHI; R31	PHI; R32	PHI; R33						37th	427
2015	Erebus Motorsport	4	Mercedes-Benz E63 AMG																																			SYD; R34; 21	SYD; R35; 22	SYD; R36; 15			37th	427
2017	Lucas Dumbrell Motorsport	3	Holden VF Commodore	ADE; R1	ADE; R2	SYM; R3	SYM; R4	PHI; R5	PHI; R6	BAR; R7	BAR; R8	WIN; R9	WIN; R10	HID; R11	HID; R12	TOW; R13	TOW; R14	QLD; R15; 26	QLD; R16; 26	SMP; R17; 20	SMP; R18; 21																						49th	297
2017	Lucas Dumbrell Motorsport	62	Holden VF Commodore																			SAN; QR; 20	SAN; R19; Ret	BAT; R20; 15	SUR; R21; 23	SUR; R22; Ret	PUK; R23	PUK; R24	NEW; R25	NEW; R26													49th	297
2018	23Red Racing	230	Ford FG X Falcon	ADE; R1	ADE; R2	MEL; R3	MEL; R4	MEL; R5	MEL; R6	SYM; R7	SYM; R8	PHI; R9	PHI; R10	BAR; R11	BAR; R12	WIN; R13	WIN; R14	HID; R15	HID; R16	TOW; R17	TOW; R18	QLD; R19	QLD; R20	SMP; R21	BEN; R22	BEN; R23	SAN; QR; 6	SAN; R24; 11	BAT; R25; 19	SUR; R26; 12	SUR; R27; C	PUK; R28	PUK; R29	NEW; R30	NEW; R31								40th	309
2019	23Red Racing	23	Ford Mustang S550	ADE; R1	ADE; R2	MEL; R3	MEL; R4	MEL; R5	MEL; R6	SYM; R7	SYM; R8	PHI; R9	PHI; R10	BAR; R11	BAR; R12	WIN; R13	WIN; R14	HID; R15	HID; R16	TOW; R17	TOW; R18	QLD; R19	QLD; R20	BEN; R21	BEN; R22	PUK; R23	PUK; R24	BAT; R25; 10	SUR; R26; 7	SUR; R27; 7	SAN; QR; 10	SAN; R28; 6	NEW; R29	NEW; R30									32nd	544
2020	Team Sydney by Tekno	19	Holden ZB Commodore	ADE; R1	ADE; R2	MEL; R3; Ret	MEL; R4; DNS	MEL; R5; DNS	MEL; R6; DNS	SMP1; R7; Ret	SMP1; R8; 17	SMP1; R9; 21	SMP2; R10; 20	SMP2; R11; 23	SMP2; R12; 20	HID1; R13; 16	HID1; R14; 17	HID1; R15; 24	HID2; R16; 18	HID2; R17; 22	HID2; R18; 20	TOW1; R19; 18	TOW1; R20; 22	TOW1; R21; 20	TOW2; R22; 13	TOW2; R23; 19	TOW2; R24; 15	BEN1; R25; 22	BEN1; R26; 20	BEN1; R27; 18	BEN2; R28; 22	BEN2; R29; DNS	BEN2; R30; DNS	BAT; R31; 12									23rd	794
2021	Dick Johnson Racing	17	Ford Mustang S550	BAT1; R1	BAT1; R2	SAN; R3	SAN; R4	SAN; R5	SYM; R6	SYM; R7	SYM; R8	BEN; R9	BEN; R10	BEN; R11	HID; R12	HID; R13	HID; R14	TOW1; R15	TOW1; R16	TOW2; R17	TOW2; R18	TOW2; R19	SMP1; R20	SMP1; R21	SMP1; R22	SMP2; R23	SMP2; R24	SMP2; R25	SMP3; R26	SMP3; R27	SMP3; R28	SMP4; R29	SMP4; R30	BAT2; R31; 10									36th	156
2022	Dick Johnson Racing	17	Ford Mustang S550	SMP; R1	SMP; R2	SYM; R3	SYM; R4	SYM; R5	MEL; R6	MEL; R7	MEL; R8	MEL; R9	BAR; R10	BAR; R11	BAR; R12	WIN; R13	WIN; R14	WIN; R15	HID; R16	HID; R17	HID; R18	TOW; R19	TOW; R20	BEN; R21	BEN; R22	BEN; R23	SAN; R24	SAN; R25	SAN; R26	PUK; R27	PUK; R28	PUK; R29	BAT; R30; Ret	SUR; R31	SUR; R32	ADE; R33	ADE; R34						NC	0
2023	Dick Johnson Racing	17	Ford Mustang S650	NEW; R1	NEW; R2	MEL; R3	MEL; R4	MEL; R5	MEL; R6	BAR; R7	BAR; R8	BAR; R9	SYM; R10	SYM; R11	SYM; R12	HID; R13	HID; R14	HID; R15	TOW; R16	TOW; R17	SMP; R18	SMP; R19	BEN; R20	BEN; R21	BEN; R22	SAN; R23; 7	BAT; R24; 16	SUR; R25	SUR; R26	ADE; R27	ADE; R28												35th	0

=== Bathurst 1000 results ===
Year	Team	Car	Co-driver	Position	Laps
2004	Perkins Engineering	Holden Commodore VX	(Australia) Jamie Whincup	9th	160
2005	Perkins Engineering	Holden Commodore VZ	(Denmark) Allan Simonsen	20th	129
2006	Dick Johnson Racing	Ford Falcon BA	(Australia) Grant Denyer	9th	161
2007	Dick Johnson Racing	Ford Falcon BF	(Australia) Andrew Thompson	8th	161
2008	Paul Cruickshank Racing	Ford Falcon BF	(New Zealand) Fabian Coulthard	10th	161
2009	Stone Brothers Racing	Ford Falcon FG	(Australia) Shane van Gisbergen	13th	161
2010	Stone Brothers Racing	Ford Falcon FG	(Australia) David Brabham	13th	161
2011	Stone Brothers Racing	Ford Falcon FG	(Australia) David Brabham	16th	161
2012	Dick Johnson Racing	Ford Falcon FG	(Australia) James Moffat	10th	161
2013	Charlie Schwerkolt Racing	Ford Falcon FG	(Australia) John McIntyre	13th	161
2014	Erebus Motorsport	Mercedes-Benz E63 AMG	(Australia) Will Davison	4th	161
2015	Erebus Motorsport	Mercedes-Benz E63 AMG	(Australia) Will Davison	12th	161
2017	Lucas Dumbrell Motorsport	Holden Commodore VF	(Australia) Alex Rullo	15th	159
2018	23Red Racing	Ford Falcon FG X	(Australia) Will Davison	19th	159
2019	23Red Racing	Ford Mustang S550	(Australia) Will Davison	10th	161
2020	Tekno Autosports	Holden Commodore ZB	(Australia) Jonathon Webb	12th	161
2021	Dick Johnson Racing	Ford Mustang S550	(Australia) Will Davison	10th	161
2022	Dick Johnson Racing	Ford Mustang S550	(Australia) Will Davison	DNF	141
2023	Dick Johnson Racing	Ford Mustang S650	(Australia) Will Davison	16th	161

=== Complete American Le Mans Series results ===
(key) (Races in bold indicate pole position; results in italics indicate fastest lap)

Year	Entrant	Class	Car	1	2	3	4	5	6	7	8	9	10	11	Rank	Points
2003	P. K. Sport	GT	Porsche 996 GT3-RS	SEB	ATL	SON; 15	TRO; 13	MOS	AME; 14	MON	MIA	PET			NC	-
2008	Flying Lizard Motorsports	GT2	Porsche 911 GT3 RSR	SEB; 2	STP										17th	34
2008	Farnbacher-Loles Motorsports	GT2	Porsche 911 GT3 RSR			LNB; 5	UTA	LIM	MID	AME	MOS	DET	PET	MON	17th	34

^{†} Did not finish the race but was classified as his car completed more than 70% of the overall winner's race distance.

=== 24 Hours of Le Mans results ===
Year	Team	Co-drivers	Car	Class	Laps	Pos.	Class pos.
2008	(Germany) Team Felbermayr-Proton	(Austria) Horst Felbermayr (Germany) Wolf Henzler	Porsche 997 GT3-RSR	GT2	309	27th	5th
2018	(United Kingdom) Gulf Racing	(United Kingdom) Mike Wainwright (United Kingdom) Ben Barker	Porsche 911 RSR	GTE; Am	283	40th	10th

=== European Le Mans Series results ===
Year	Team	Car	Class	1	2	3	4	5	6	Rank	PTS
2018	Gulf Racing	Porsche 911 RSR	LMGTE	LEC; Ret	MNZ	RBR	SIL; 5	SPA	ALG	7th	10

=== FIA World Endurance Championship results ===
Year	Entrant	Class	Chassis	Engine	1	2	3	4	5	6	7	8	Rank	Points
2018–19	Gulf Racing UK	LMGTE Am	Porsche 911 RSR	Porsche 4.0 L Flat-6	SPA; 7	LMS; 10	SIL; 6	FUJ	SHA	SEB	SPA	LMS	17th	26

^{*} Season still in progress.
