= 2004 Australian Carrera Cup Championship =

Motor racing competition

The 2004 Australian Carrera Cup Championship was a CAMS sanctioned motor racing competition open to Porsche 911 GT3 Cup cars. The championship, which was the second Australian Carrera Cup Championship, was contested over a nine round series and was administered by CupCar Australia Pty Ltd. Alex Davison won the title from Jim Richards and Fabian Coulthard.

== Calendar ==
The championship was contested over a nine round series with three races per round.

Round	Circuit	State	Date	Round winner
1	Adelaide Parklands Circuit	South Australia	18–21 March	Alex Davison
2	Eastern Creek International Raceway	New South Wales	2–4 April	Alex Davison
3	Hidden Valley Raceway	Northern Territory	21–23 May	Alex Davison
4	Barbagallo Raceway	Western Australia	11–13 June	Alex Davison
5	Queensland Raceway	Queensland	2–4 July	Alex Davison
6	Winton Motor Raceway	Victoria	23–25 July	Jim Richards
7	Sandown International Motor Raceway	Victoria	10–12 September	Jim Richards
8	Mount Panorama, Bathurst	New South Wales	7–10 October	Alex Davison
9	Surfers Paradise Street Circuit	Queensland	21–24 October	Craig Baird

== Points system ==
Points were awarded in each race as follows:

Finishing position	1st	2nd	3rd	4th	5th	6th	7th	8th	9th	10th	11th	12th	13th	14th	15th	16th	17th	18th	19th	20th	21st-last
Points awarded	60	54	48	42	36	30	27	24	21	18	15	12	9	6	6	3	3	3	3	3	1

== Results ==
Rd	Race	Circuit	Pole Position	Fastest Lap	Drivers' Winner	Teams' Winner	Round Winner
1	1	(South Australia) Adelaide	(Australia) Alex Davison	(Australia) Alex Davison	(Australia) Alex Davison	Greg Murphy Racing	(Australia) Alex Davison
1	2	(South Australia) Adelaide		(New Zealand) Jim Richards	(Australia) Alex Davison	Greg Murphy Racing	(Australia) Alex Davison
1	3	(South Australia) Adelaide		(Australia) Alex Davison	(Australia) Alex Davison	Greg Murphy Racing	(Australia) Alex Davison
2	1	(New South Wales) Eastern Creek	(Australia) Alex Davison	(Australia) Alex Davison	(Australia) Alex Davison	Greg Murphy Racing	(Australia) Alex Davison
2	2	(New South Wales) Eastern Creek		(Australia) Alex Davison	(New Zealand) Jim Richards	Jim Richards Racing	(Australia) Alex Davison
2	3	(New South Wales) Eastern Creek		(New Zealand) Jim Richards	(Australia) Peter Fitzgerald	Fitzgerald Racing	(Australia) Alex Davison
3	1	(Northern Territory) Darwin	(New Zealand) Jim Richards	(New Zealand) Jim Richards	(Australia) Alex Davison	Greg Murphy Racing	(Australia) Alex Davison
3	2	(Northern Territory) Darwin		(Australia) Alex Davison	(Australia) Alex Davison	Greg Murphy Racing	(Australia) Alex Davison
3	3	(Northern Territory) Darwin		(Australia) Alex Davison	(Australia) Alex Davison	Greg Murphy Racing	(Australia) Alex Davison
4	1	(Western Australia) Wanneroo	(Australia) Alex Davison	(Australia) Alex Davison	(Australia) Alex Davison	Greg Murphy Racing	(Australia) Alex Davison
4	2	(Western Australia) Wanneroo		(New Zealand) Jim Richards	(Australia) Alex Davison	Greg Murphy Racing	(Australia) Alex Davison
4	3	(Western Australia) Wanneroo		(New Zealand) Jim Richards	(New Zealand) Jim Richards	Jim Richards Racing	(Australia) Alex Davison
5	1	Queensland	(Australia) Alex Davison	(Australia) Alex Davison	(Australia) Alex Davison	Greg Murphy Racing	(Australia) Alex Davison
5	2	Queensland		(Australia) Alex Davison	(Australia) Alex Davison	Greg Murphy Racing	(Australia) Alex Davison
5	3	Queensland		(New Zealand) Fabian Coulthard	(Australia) Alex Davison	Greg Murphy Racing	(Australia) Alex Davison
6	1	(Victoria (state)) Winton	(New Zealand) Jim Richards	(New Zealand) Jim Richards	(Australia) Alex Davison	Greg Murphy Racing	(New Zealand) Jim Richards
6	2	(Victoria (state)) Winton		(New Zealand) Jim Richards	(New Zealand) Jim Richards	Jim Richards Racing	(New Zealand) Jim Richards
6	3	(Victoria (state)) Winton		(New Zealand) Fabian Coulthard	(New Zealand) Fabian Coulthard	Greg Murphy Racing	(New Zealand) Jim Richards
7	1	(Victoria (state)) Sandown	(New Zealand) Fabian Coulthard	(New Zealand) Jim Richards	(New Zealand) Jim Richards	Jim Richards Racing	(New Zealand) Jim Richards
7	2	(Victoria (state)) Sandown		(Australia) Alex Davison	(Australia) Alex Davison	Greg Murphy Racing	(New Zealand) Jim Richards
7	3	(Victoria (state)) Sandown		(New Zealand) Jim Richards	(New Zealand) Jim Richards	Jim Richards Racing	(New Zealand) Jim Richards
8	1	(New South Wales) Bathurst	(New Zealand) Jim Richards	(Australia) Alex Davison	(Australia) Alex Davison	Greg Murphy Racing	(Australia) Alex Davison
8	2	(New South Wales) Bathurst		(Australia) Alex Davison	(New Zealand) Fabian Coulthard	Greg Murphy Racing	(Australia) Alex Davison
8	3	(New South Wales) Bathurst		(Australia) Alex Davison	(Australia) Alex Davison	Greg Murphy Racing	(Australia) Alex Davison
9	1	(Queensland) Surfers Paradise	(Australia) Alex Davison	(Australia) Alex Davison	(Australia) Alex Davison	Greg Murphy Racing	(New Zealand) Craig Baird
9	2	(Queensland) Surfers Paradise		(New Zealand) Fabian Coulthard	(New Zealand) Jim Richards	Jim Richards Racing	(New Zealand) Craig Baird
9	3	(Queensland) Surfers Paradise		(New Zealand) Fabian Coulthard	(New Zealand) Craig Baird	VIP Petfoods Racing	(New Zealand) Craig Baird

== Championship standings ==
Position	Driver	No.	Car	Entrant	Adel	EC	HV	Barb	QR	Wint	Sand	Bath	GC	Total
1	Alex Davison	77	Porsche 911 GT3 Cup Type 996	Greg Murphy Racing Australia P/L	180	150	180	174	120	156	108	174	102	1344
2	Jim Richards	1	Porsche 911 GT3 Cup Type 996	Jim Richards	162	135	162	168	54	168	120	27	150	1146
3	Fabian Coulthard	55	Porsche 911 GT3 Cup Type 996	Greg Murphy Racing Australia P/L	144	96	144	144	102	144	30	117	150	1071
4	Peter Fitzgerald	3	Porsche 911 GT3 Cup Type 996	Peter Fitzgerald	90	120	72	126	54	108	43	0	45	658
5	Klark Quinn	28	Porsche 911 GT3 Cup Type 996	VIP Petfoods	63	36	42	102	42	48	48	126	57	564
6	Jonathon Webb	22	Porsche 911 GT3 Cup Type 996	Tekno Motorsports	–	57	120	–	30	90	84	150	0	531
7	Tony Quinn	8	Porsche 911 GT3 Cup Type 996	VIP Petfoods	81	66	15	87	39	21	6	102	114	531
8	Paul Pedersen	96	Porsche 911 GT3 Cup Type 996	International Motorsport NZ	–	99	96	84	66	–	48	–	39	432
9	Rodney Jane	7	Porsche 911 GT3 Cup Type 996	Rodney Jane Racing	30	108	54	45	42	48	48	24	27	426
10	Dean Grant	10	Porsche 911 GT3 Cup Type 996	Dean Grant	87	48	30	63	39	27	15	33	57	399
11	James Cressey	2	Porsche 911 GT3 Cup Type 996	VIP Petfoods	105	45	63	42	75	48	–	–	–	378
12	Stephen Borness	24	Porsche 911 GT3 Cup Type 996	Stephen Borness	48	42	48	21	18	42	1	63	72	355
13	Craig Baird	2	Porsche 911 GT3 Cup Type 996	VIP Petfoods	–	–	–	–	–	–	54	114	156	324
14	Peter Hill	66	Porsche 911 GT3 Cup Type 996	Greg Murphy Racing Australia P/L	48	45	–	–	48	42	45	33	45	306
15	Peter Bradbury	42	Porsche 911 GT3 Cup Type 996	Peter Bradbury	45	81	48	51	39	–	15	–	–	279
16	Charlie O'Brien	15	Porsche 911 GT3 Cup Type 996	WPS	–	–	–	–	–	93	42	33	108	276
17	Kevin Bell	14/82	Porsche 911 GT3 Cup Type 996	International Motorsport NZ	–	–	108	–	–	–	45	81	–	234
18	Matt Halliday	42	Porsche 911 GT3 Cup Type 996	Lakesawn Timber	–	–	–	–	–	102	–	27	–	129
19	Roger Oakeshott	44	Porsche 911 GT3 Cup Type 996	Greg Murphy Racing Australia P/L	36	18	15	–	6	18	4	–	27	124
20	David Thexton	69	Porsche 911 GT3 Cup Type 996	Thexton Racing	–	–	9	24	12	12	36	9	12	114
21	Ash Samadi	21	Porsche 911 GT3 Cup Type 996	Ash Samadi	18	3	6	12	18	12	2	18	21	110
22	Marc Cini	12	Porsche 911 GT3 Cup Type 996	Marc Cini	27	0	–	–	15	21	3	12	9	87
23	Paul Freestone	17	Porsche 911 GT3 Cup Type 996	Freestone's Transport	–	–	–	27	–	45	–	12	–	84
24	Ross Rutherford	92	Porsche 911 GT3 Cup Type 996	International Motorsport NZ	63	9	12	–	–	–	–	–	–	84
25	Matthew Coleman	62	Porsche 911 GT3 Cup Type 996	Matthew Coleman	–	–	–	–	–	–	4	66	–	70
26	Troy Hunt	4	Porsche 911 GT3 Cup Type 996	Talent 2	–	57	–	0	–	–	–	–	–	57
27	Bryce Washington	54	Porsche 911 GT3 Cup Type 996	ADRAD Radiators	–	–	–	–	–	–	–	6	45	51
28	Claude Giorgi	44	Porsche 911 GT3 Cup Type 996	Braun	–	–	–	39	–	–	–	–	–	39
29	James Koundouris	18	Porsche 911 GT3 Cup Type 996	Supabarn Supermarkets	–	–	–	–	–	–	12	18	–	30
30	Tony Pugliese	66	Porsche 911 GT3 Cup Type 996	Greg Murphy Racing Australia P/L	–	–	21	–	–	–	–	–	–	21
31	Chris Seidler	11	Porsche 911 GT3 Cup Type 996	Enterprise Express Racing	–	–	–	–	–	–	18	–	–	18
32	Graham Cameron	95	Porsche 911 GT3 Cup Type 996	Can Am Construction	–	–	–	–	–	–	9	–	–	9
33	David Giugni	19	Porsche 911 GT3 Cup Type 996	Suparbarn Supermarkets	–	–	–	–	–	–	–	9	–	9
34	Dean Cook	34	Porsche 911 GT3 Cup Type 996	Redline Promotions	–	–	–	–	–	–	6	–	–	6
35	Theo Koundouris	19	Porsche 911 GT3 Cup Type 996	Suparbarn Supermarkets	–	–	–	–	–	–	6	–	–	6

Race 2 of Round 5 at Queensland Raceway was cancelled following a crash on the first lap of the race.

=== Additional awards ===
- TAG Heuer Carrera Challenge - For Drivers 35 years or over in a 2003 Porsche 911 GT3 Cup Car - Dean Grant
- Michelin Porsche Driver to Europe - For Drivers under 30 who haven't driven in a European Porsche series - Fabian Coulthard
- Michelin Rookie of the Year - For Drivers in their first Porsche racing series - Fabian Coulthard
- Fuchs Hard Charger - For the Driver who passes the most cars in Carrera Cup races - Tony Quinn
- Highest placed New Zealand based driver - Paul Pedersen
