= 2005 Australian Carrera Cup Championship =

Australian motor racing competition

The 2005 Australian Carrera Cup Championship was a CAMS sanctioned national motor racing championship open to Porsche 911 GT3 Cup cars. The championship, which was the third Australian Carrera Cup Championship, was administered by CupCar Australia Pty Ltd. and was promoted as the “Wright Patton Shakespeare Carrera Cup Australia”. The title was won by Fabian Coulthard.

== Calendar ==
The championship was contested over a nine round series with three races per round.

Round	Circuit	State	Date	Round winner
1	Adelaide Parklands Circuit	South Australia	17-20 March	Fabian Coulthard
2	Barbagallo Raceway	Western Australia	6-8 May	Fabian Coulthard
3	Eastern Creek International Raceway	New South Wales	27-29 May	Jonathon Webb
4	Queensland Raceway	Queensland	22-24 July	Fabian Coulthard
5	Oran Park Motorsport Circuit	New South Wales	12-14 August	Fabian Coulthard
6	Sandown International Motor Raceway	Victoria	9-11 September	Jim Richards
7	Mount Panorama, Bathurst	New South Wales	6-9 October	Fabian Coulthard
8	Surfers Paradise Street Circuit	Queensland	21-23 October	Fabian Coulthard
9	Phillip Island Grand Prix Circuit	Victoria	25-27 November	Jim Richards

== Points system ==
Points were awarded in each race as per the following table:

Finishing position	1st	2nd	3rd	4th	5th	6th	7th	8th	9th	10th	11th	12th	13th	14th	15th	16th	17th	18th	19th	20th	21st-last
Points awarded	60	54	48	42	36	30	27	24	21	18	15	12	9	6	6	3	3	3	3	3	1

== Results ==
Pos.	Driver	No.	Entrant	Ade	Bar	EC	QR	OP	San	Bat	Sur	PI	Penalty	Total
1	Fabian Coulthard	3	Glenfords Tools Centres / Makita	174	174	69	120	174	114	120	180	150	-	1275
2	Jim Richards	2	OAMPS Insurance / Greenfield Mowers	168	168	99	96	132	174	102	24	162	-	1125
3	Jonathon Webb	22	Tekno Autosports	102	132	162	54	48	96	84	72	138	-10	878
4	Luke Youlden	28	VIP Petfoods (Aust) P/L	144	96	138	3	162	108	66	39	-	-20	736
5	David Reynolds	14	Sonic Motor Racing Services	30	36	129	108	102	102	54	18	96	-	675
6	Peter Fitzgerald	4	ACER Computers / ABCOR	30	102	93	84	69	87	66	57	21	-	609
7	Klark Quinn	5	VIP Petfoods (Aust) P/L	114	48	42	39	30	48	54	162	57	-	594
8	Ian Dyk	9	Glenfords / Dewalt / AEG / Sellys	69	30	6	30	96	87	21	120	126	-	585
9	Cameron McLean	27	Sherrin Hire P/L	51	96	69	0	108	81	0	114	-	-	519
10	Alan Gurr	6	Glenfords / Hitachi / Sirromet	108	63	84	30	45	54	-	-	108	-	492
11	James Cressey	23	Paul Cruikshank Racing	63	48	75	27	84	84	42	51	-	-	474
12	Bryce Washington	54	Adrad Radiators	30	87	90	-	54	24	63	90	21	-	459
13	Rodney Jane	7	Bob Jane T-Marts	21	30	54	66	33	18	39	39	42	-	342
14	Dean Grant	10	Dean Grant	42	39	36	12	15	36	12	51	33	-	276
15	Tony Quinn	8	VIP Petfoods (Aust) P/L	27	33	33	42	9	9	18	30	39	-	240
16	Paul Freestone	25	Freestone Transport / Biante	6	24	6	36	24	30	0	84	30	-	240
17	Theo Koundouris	19	Supabarn Supermarkets	3	6	15	30	15	21	3	27	51	-	171
18	Ash Samadi	55	Globe	15	10	4	21	9	30	12	21	15	-	137
19	James Koundouris	18	Supabarn Supermarkets	0	15	15	9	9	6	0	39	27	-	120
20	Andrew Luxton	17	Hyundai Construction	-	6	6	3	-	-	18	-	63	-	96
21	Marc Cini	12	Adamco	12	7	7	9	9	21	12	9	9	-	95
22	Shane McKillen	42	International Motorsport NZ	6	9	18	9	-	-	15	0	-	-	57
23	Paul Pedersen	42	42 Below Vodka	-	-	-	-	30	12	-	-	-	-	42
24	Alistair Bye	27	Sherrin Hire	-	-	-	-	-	-	-	-	39	-	39
25	Charlie O'Brien	15	Tenkate Group	27	-	-	-	-	-	-	-	-	-	27
26	Brett Francis	28	VIP Petfoods	-	-	-	-	-	-	-	-	21	-	21
27	Stephen Borness	24	Celerity Racing	-	-	15	-	-	-	-	-	-	-	15
28	Shannon O'Brien	6	Glenfords Tool Centres / Hitachi	-	-	-	-	-	-	15	-	-	-	15

All cars were Porsche 911 GT3 Cup Type 996s as mandated by the technical regulations for the championship.

Race 2 at the Bathurst round was stopped after an accident and no points were awarded for the race.
