= 2013 Tasmania Microsoft Office 365 =

2013 V8 Supercar championship race

Event Information
- Round 2 of 14 in the 2013 International V8 Supercars Championship
- Date: 5–7 April 2013
- Location: Launceston, Tasmania
- Venue: Symmons Plains Raceway
- Weather: Fine

Results
Race 1
Distance	50 laps	120 km
Pole position	Jamie Whincup; Triple Eight Race Engineering	51.1057
Winner	Fabian Coulthard; Brad Jones Racing	1:17:41.5215
Race 2
Distance	42 laps	100 km
Pole position	Jason Bright; Brad Jones Racing	51.1940
Winner	Jason Bright; Brad Jones Racing	40:33.8545
Race 3
Distance	42 laps	100 km
Pole position	Mark Winterbottom; Ford Performance Racing	51.2052
Winner	Fabian Coulthard; Brad Jones Racing	42:20.8286

The 2013 Tasmania Microsoft Office 365 was a motor race meeting for the Australian sedan-based V8 Supercars. It was the second event of the 2013 International V8 Supercars Championship. It was held on the weekend of 5–7 April at the Symmons Plains Raceway, near Launceston, Tasmania.

The race meeting was the first to feature the new for 2013 format of a half-time concept in a motor race. The first of the meeting's three races was halted after 25 of 50 laps for a break of approximately 20 minutes before regridding and restarting.

== Report ==
=== Race 3 ===
==== Race ====
Pos.	No.	Name	Car	Team	Grid	Time	Points
1	14	(New Zealand) Fabian Coulthard	Holden VF Commodore	Brad Jones Racing	2	1:17:41.5215	100
2	1	(Australia) Jamie Whincup	Holden VF Commodore	Triple Eight Race Engineering	1	+1.1381	92
3	5	(Australia) Mark Winterbottom	Ford FG Falcon	Ford Performance Racing	3	+1.3025	86
4	8	(Australia) Jason Bright	Holden VF Commodore	Brad Jones Racing	5	+1.9895	80
5	2	(Australia) Garth Tander	Holden VF Commodore	Holden Racing Team	4	+2.2455	74
6	6	(Australia) Will Davison	Ford FG Falcon	Ford Performance Racing	6	+2.5532	68
7	97	(New Zealand) Shane van Gisbergen	Holden VF Commodore	Tekno Autosports	7	+4.2805	64
8	33	(New Zealand) Scott McLaughlin	Holden VF Commodore	Garry Rogers Motorsport	9	+4.7575	60
9	22	(Australia) James Courtney	Holden VF Commodore	Holden Racing Team	13	+4.9605	56
10	19	(Australia) Jonathon Webb	Holden VF Commodore	Tekno Autosports	12	+6.5115	52
11	21	(Australia) David Wall	Holden VF Commodore	Britek Motorsport	14	+6.8605	48
12	3	(Australia) Tony D'Alberto	Holden VF Commodore	Tony D'Alberto Racing	16	+7.4219	46
13	18	(Australia) Alex Davison	Ford FG Falcon	Charlie Schwerkolt Racing	10	+8.4570	44
14	55	(Australia) David Reynolds	Ford FG Falcon	Rod Nash Racing	11	+8.6985	42
15	66	(Australia) Russell Ingall	Holden VF Commodore	Walkinshaw Racing	17	+10.3005	40
16	36	(Australia) Michael Caruso	Nissan Altima L33	Nissan Motorsport	24	+10.8398	38
17	17	(Australia) Tim Blanchard	Ford FG Falcon	Dick Johnson Racing	26	+11.6811	36
18	80	(Australia) Scott Pye	Holden VF Commodore	Lucas Dumbrell Motorsport	18	+12.4258	34
19	360	(Australia) James Moffat	Nissan Altima L33	Nissan Motorsport	22	+13.2959	32
20	15	(Australia) Rick Kelly	Nissan Altima L33	Nissan Motorsport	25	+13.5361	30
21	34	(France) Alexandre Prémat	Holden VF Commodore	Garry Rogers Motorsport	15	+14.0762	28
22	47	(Australia) Tim Slade	Mercedes-Benz E63 AMG	James Rosenberg Racing	23	+14.1915	26
23	4	(Australia) Lee Holdsworth	Mercedes-Benz E63 AMG	Erebus Motorsport	21	+14.4315	24
24	12	(New Zealand) Jonny Reid	Ford FG Falcon	Dick Johnson Racing	27	+15.6785	22
25	88	(Australia) Dean Fiore	Holden VF Commodore	Lucas Dumbrell Motorsport	19	+19.6355	20
26	888	(Australia) Craig Lowndes	Holden VF Commodore	Triple Eight Race Engineering	8	+1 lap	18
Ret	9	(Germany) Maro Engel	Mercedes-Benz E63 AMG	Erebus Motorsport	28	Retired	
Ret	7	(Australia) Todd Kelly	Nissan Altima L33	Nissan Motorsport	20	Retired	

== Championship standings after the race ==
- After 5 of 36 races.

Drivers' Championship standings

	Pos.	Driver	Points
1	1	Jamie Whincup	513
1	2	Will Davison	450
2	3	James Courtney	398
3	4	Craig Lowndes	397
1	5	Scott McLaughlin	366

Teams' Championship standings

	Pos.	Constructor	Points
	1	Triple Eight Race Engineering	910
	2	Ford Performance Racing	807
2	3	Holden Racing Team	727
1	4	Tekno Autosports	648
9	5	Brad Jones Racing	633

- Note: Only the top five positions are included for both sets of standings.
