= Fabian Coulthard =

New Zealand racing driver

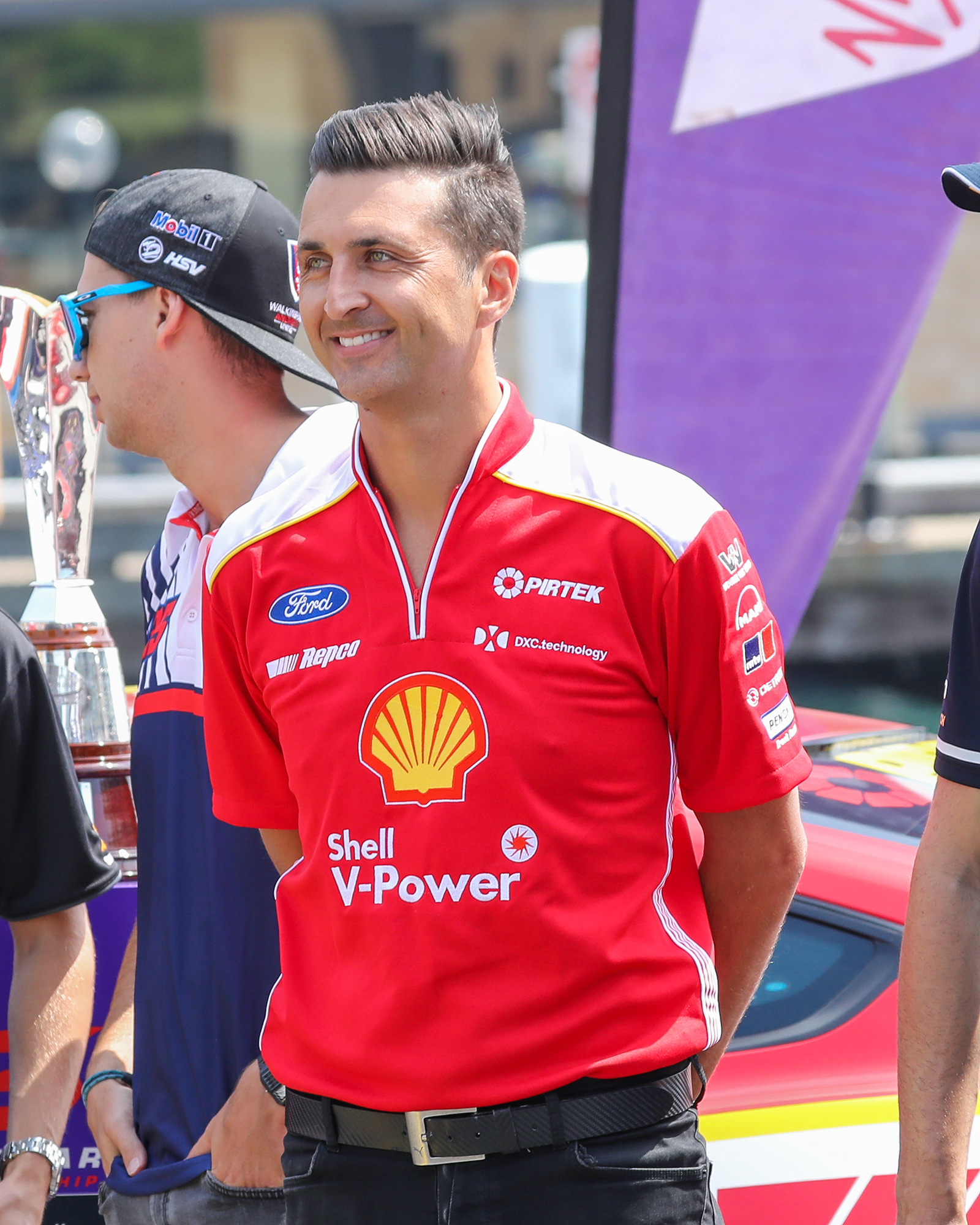
- Coulthard in 2020
- Nationality: New Zealander
- Born: 28 July 1982 (age 44) Burnley, England
- Relatives: David Coulthard (second cousin); Dayton Coulthard (second nephew)
- Categorisation: FIA Silver

Supercars Championship career
- Current team: Walkinshaw TWG Racing
- Championships: 0
- Races: 416
- Wins: 13
- Podiums: 57
- Pole positions: 9
- 2022 position: 29th (276)

Fabian "Fabs" Coulthard (born 28 July 1982) is a New Zealand professional race car driver, currently competing in the Repco Supercars Championship, who drives as an endurance co-driver for Chaz Mostert with Walkinshaw TWG Racing. Fabian is a second cousin of former Formula One driver David Coulthard.

== Early career ==
Coulthard was born in Burnley, England but raised in Auckland, New Zealand. He started his career in karts before moving into Formula Ford. He competed in the Formula Ford support races at the 2002 Australian Grand Prix, winning the Alan Jones Trophy with two wins and a second place in the three races. Coulthard also won the 2001/2002 New Zealand Formula Ford Championship. In the United Kingdom, Coulthard competed in British Formula Renault, where he was teammates with future Formula One world champion Lewis Hamilton. With his budget exhausted, Coulthard returned to Australia to race in the Australian Carrera Cup Championship, finishing third and best rookie in 2004 and winning the title in 2005.

== Supercars Championship ==
In 2006, Coulthard signed to drive with Paul Morris Motorsport, he shared a car with Alan Gurr and Steve Ellery. Coulthard returned to drive the older model VZ Commodore for the same team in 2007, before stepping out after Bathurst to concentrate on his 2008 plans.

=== Paul Cruickshank Racing ===
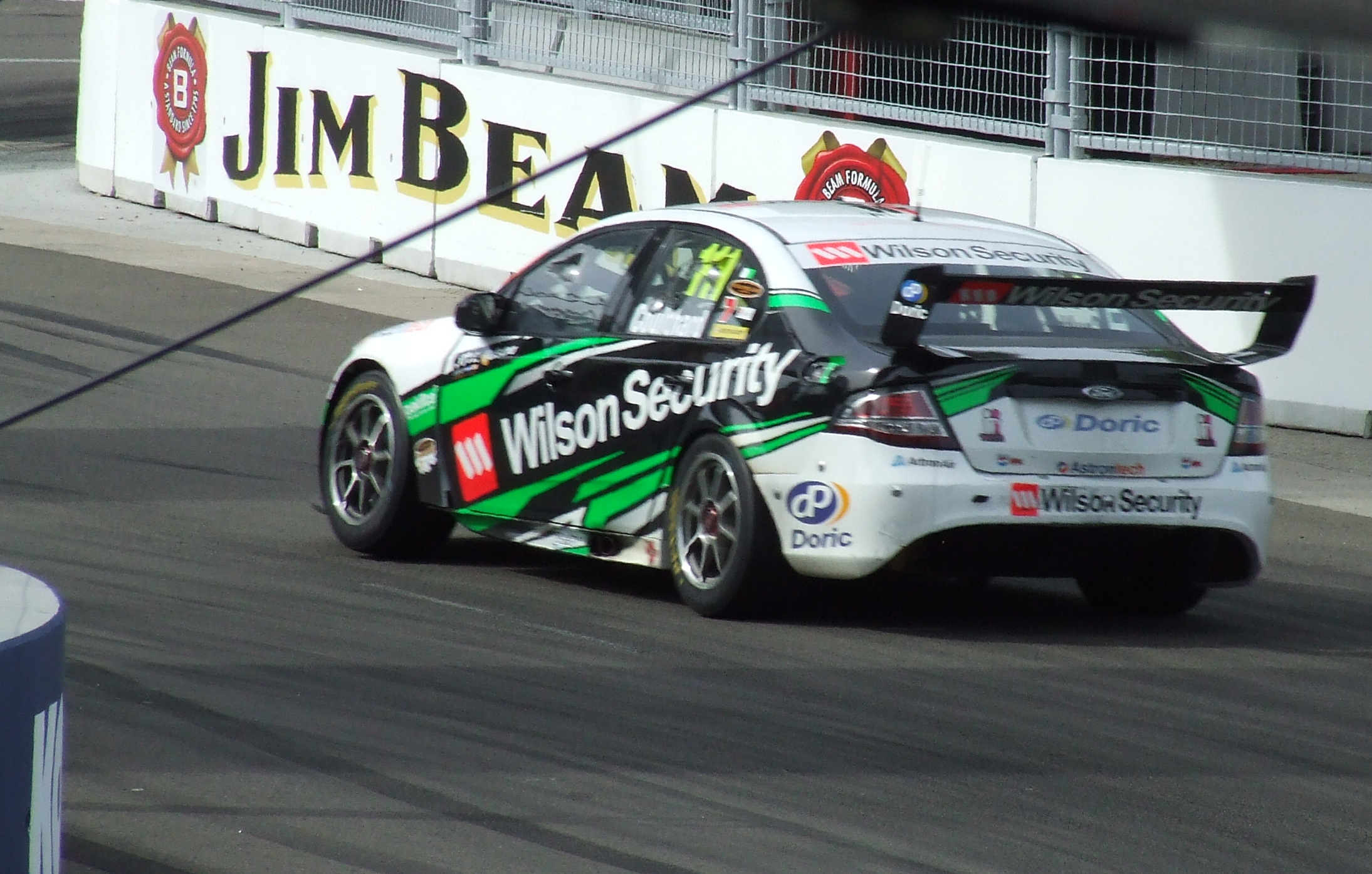
Coulthard at the 2009 Sydney Telstra 500

Coulthard enjoyed a breakout season in 2008 driving for Paul Cruickshank Racing. Driving a Ford Falcon (BF), Coulthard finished in the top ten on six separate occasions, including fifth place on home soil in Hamilton, New Zealand and finishing the season in a respectable 13th in the championship.

In 2009, Coulthard returned with PCR, driving a brand new Ford Falcon (FG) having another consistent year behind the wheel of the Falcon. At Symmons Plains Raceway Coulthard broke through for his first podium result in V8 Supercars, finishing third at the 2009 Falken Tasmania Challenge and finished the season in another consistent 16th in the championship.

=== Walkinshaw Racing ===
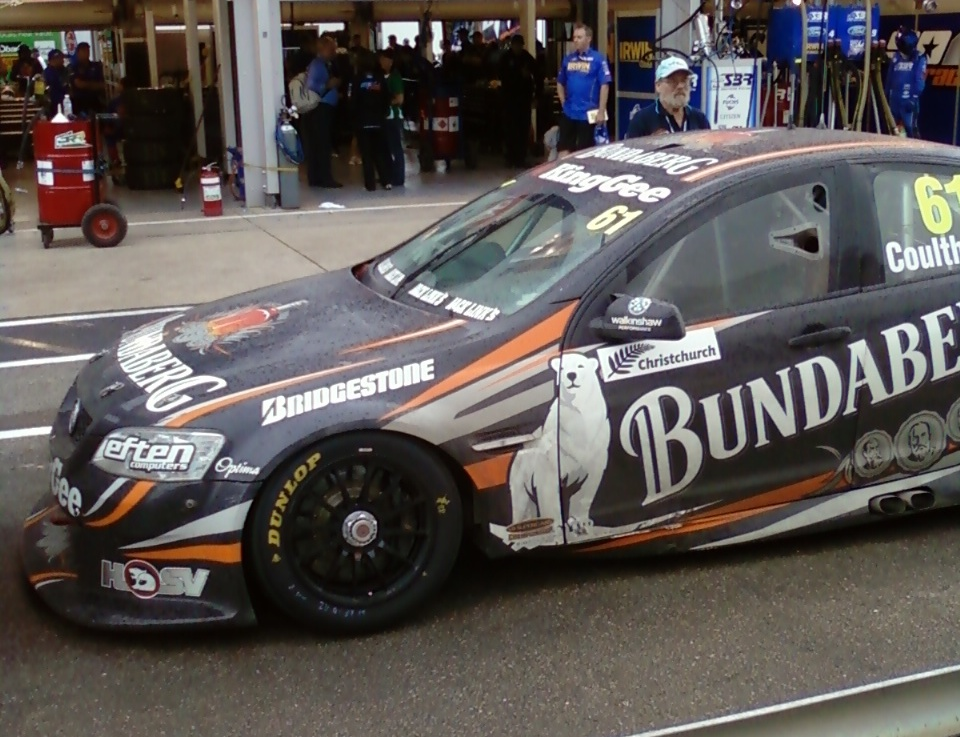
Coulthard's Holden Commodore (VE) at the 2011 Clipsal 500 Adelaide

In 2010 he joined Walkinshaw Racing, the same operation as the famous Holden Racing Team. On the first lap of the 2010 Supercheap Auto Bathurst 1000, his left-rear tyre blew after earlier contact, spun at 280 km/h through The Chase and rolled six times in the sand-trap before coming to a stop. Coulthard has failed to replicate his 2008/2009 speed with only three respectable results being a seventh in race 5 of the championship, at the 2010 Clipsal 500 an eighth at 2010 Falken Tasmania Challenge and another fifth at the Sydney Telstra 500.

In 2011, Coulthard continued racing with Walkinshaw Racing, driving the No. 61 Bundaberg Racing Team VE Commodore.

Fabian Coulthard 2010 Supercheap Auto Bathurst 1000 rollover sequence
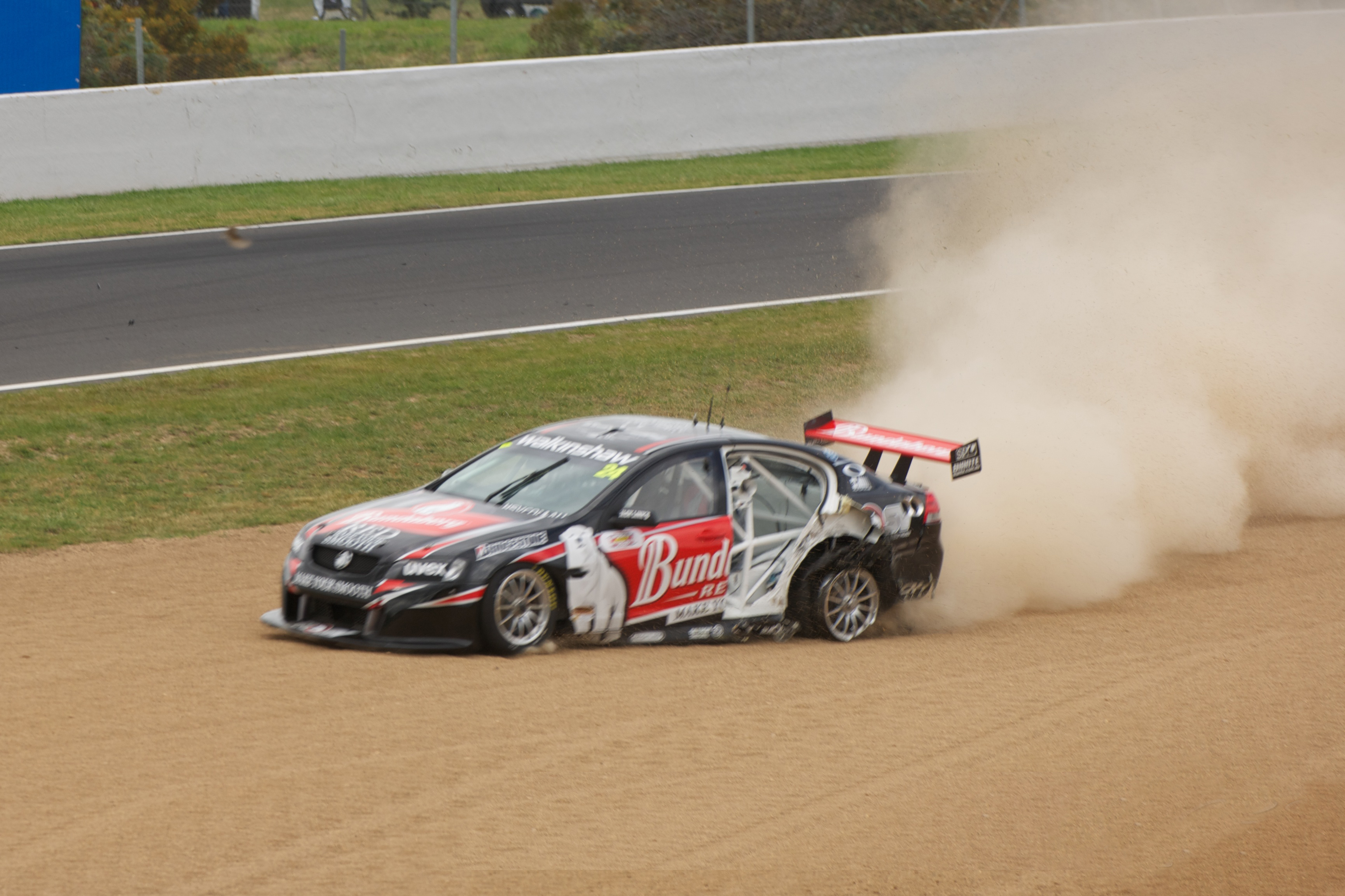

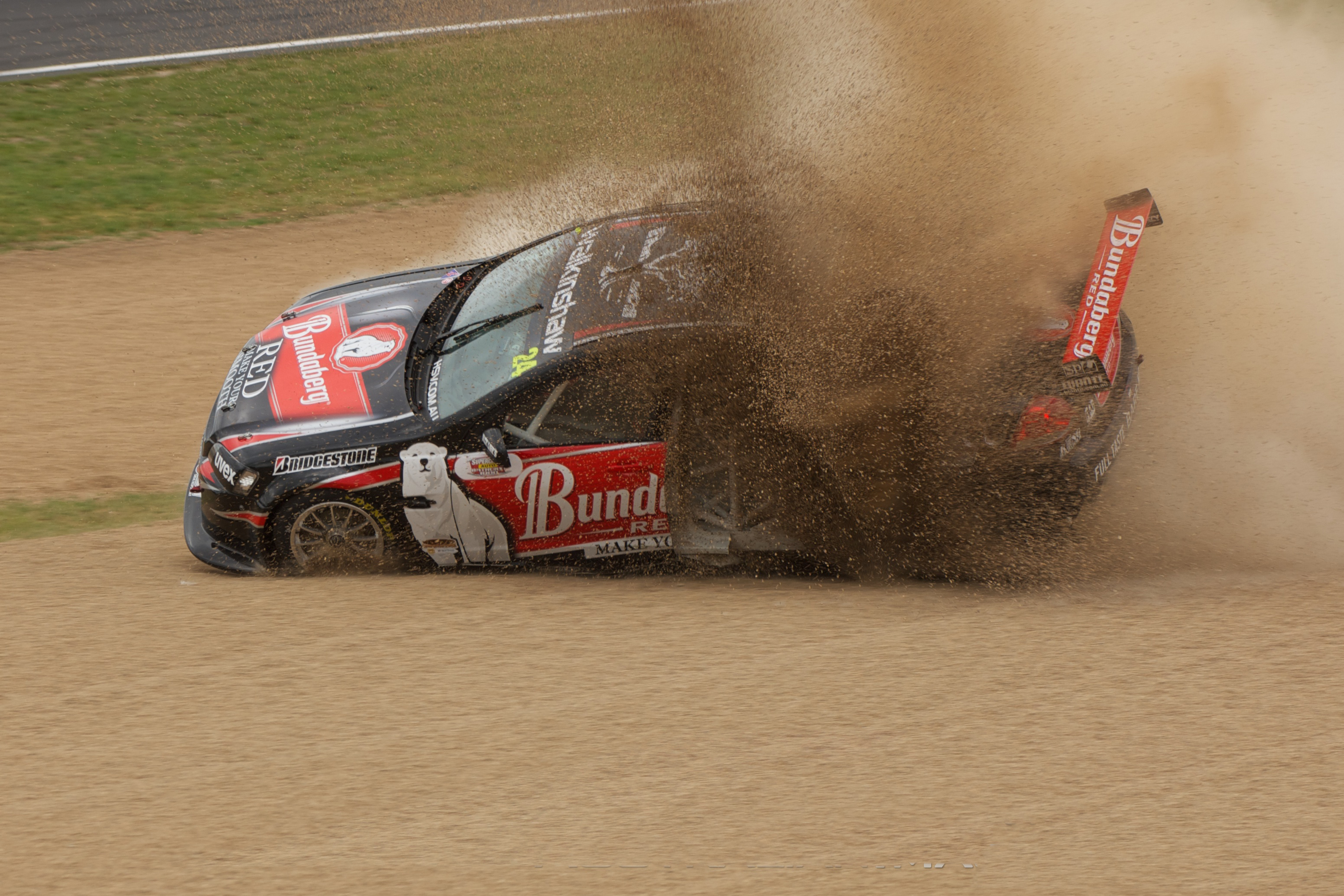

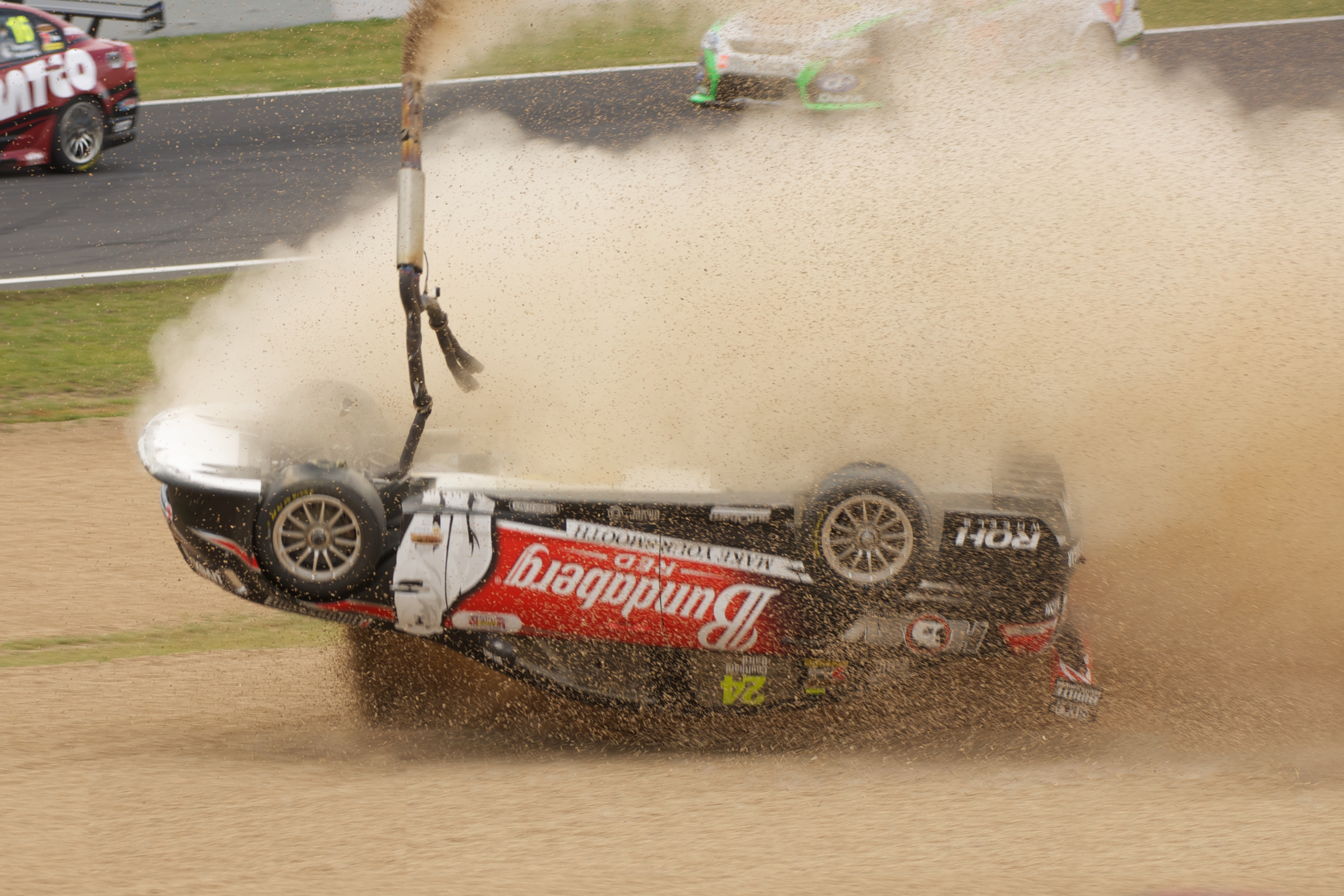

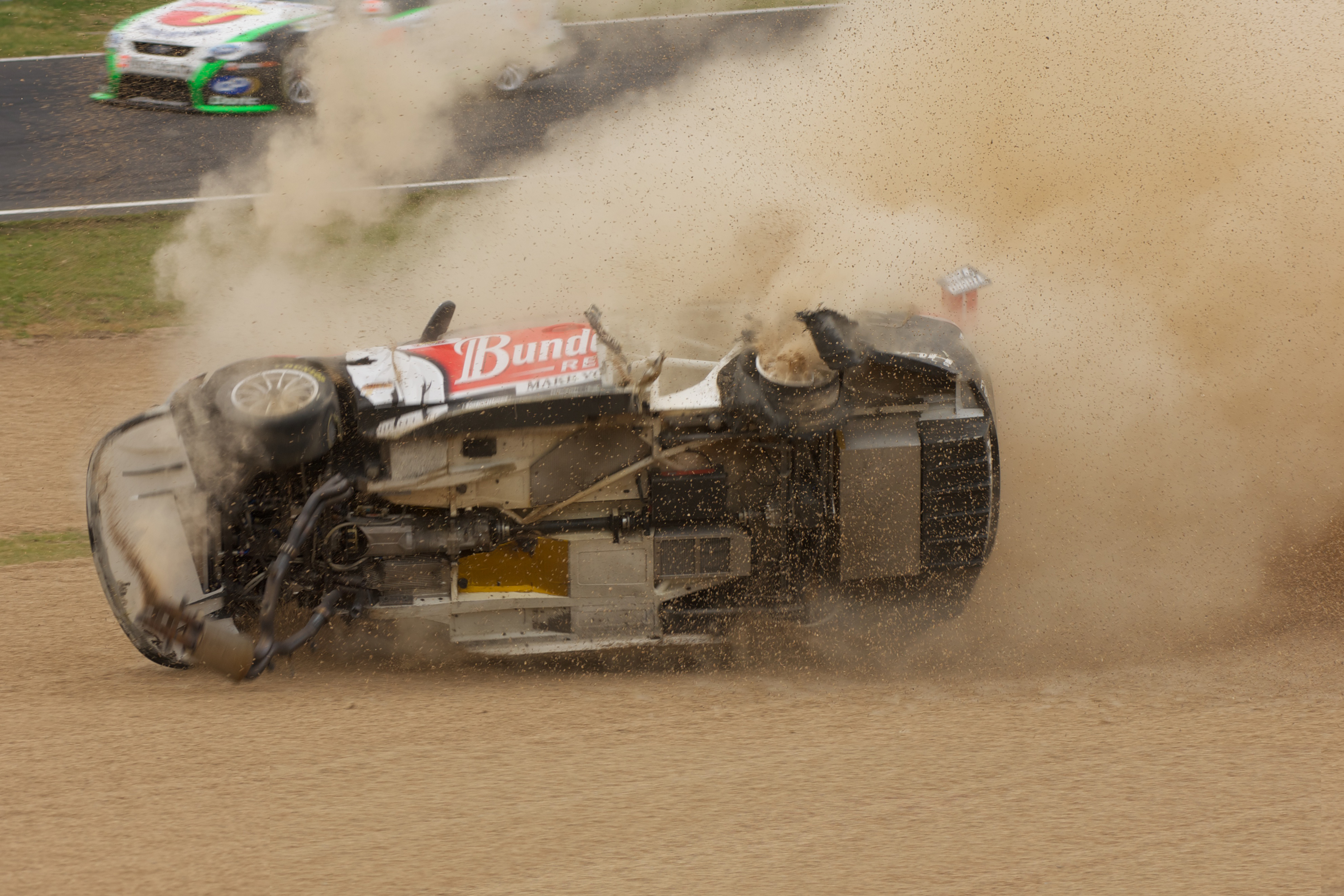

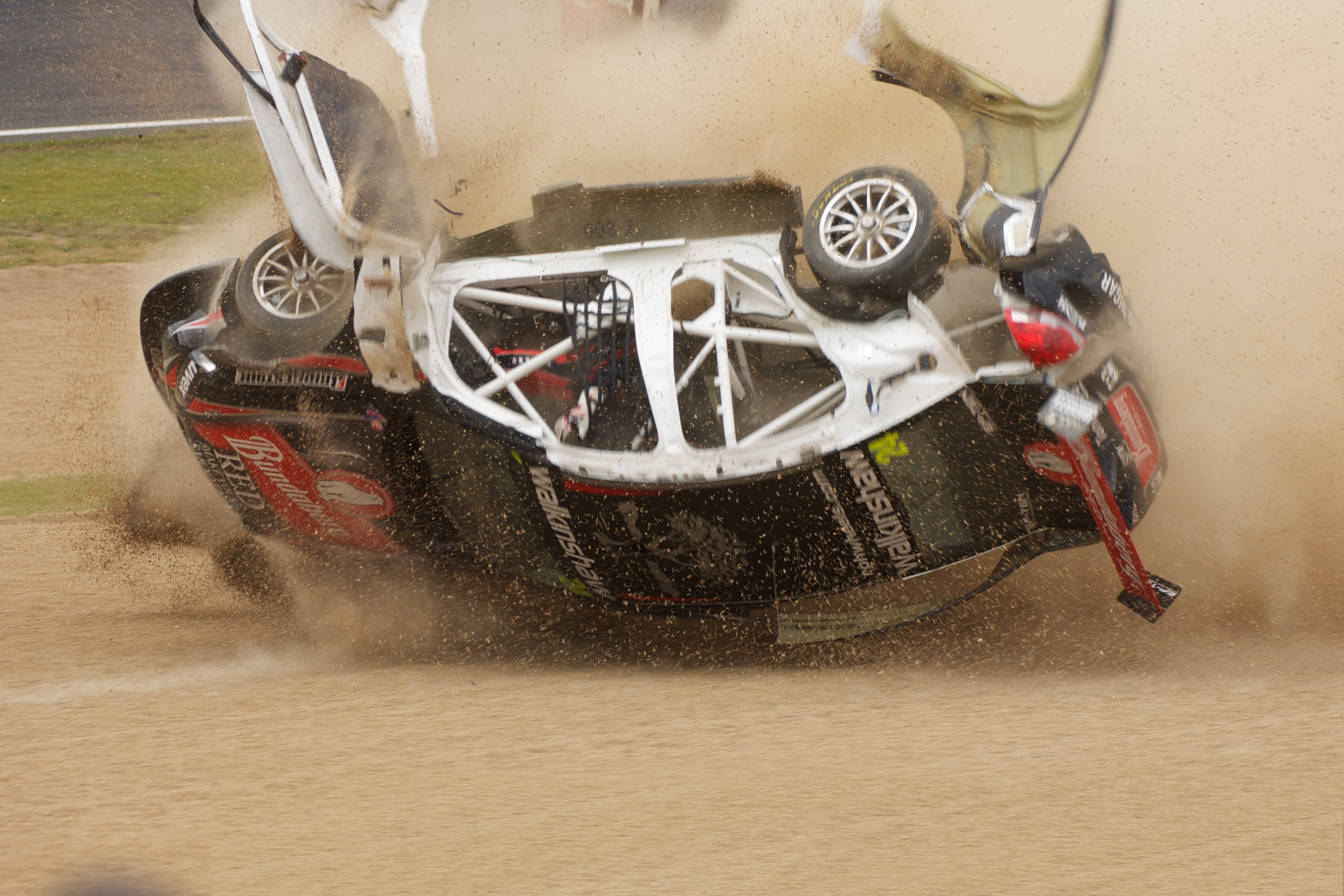

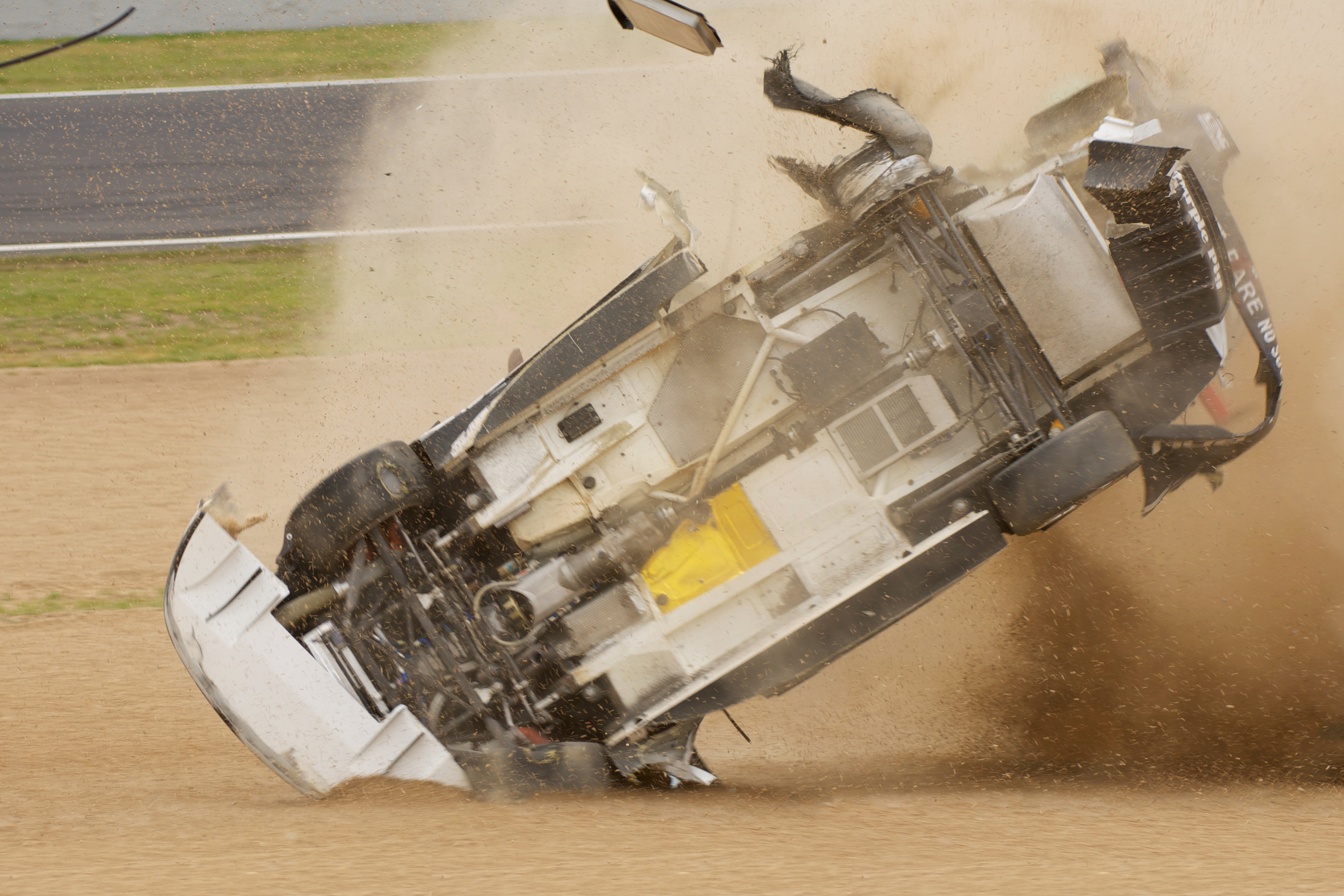

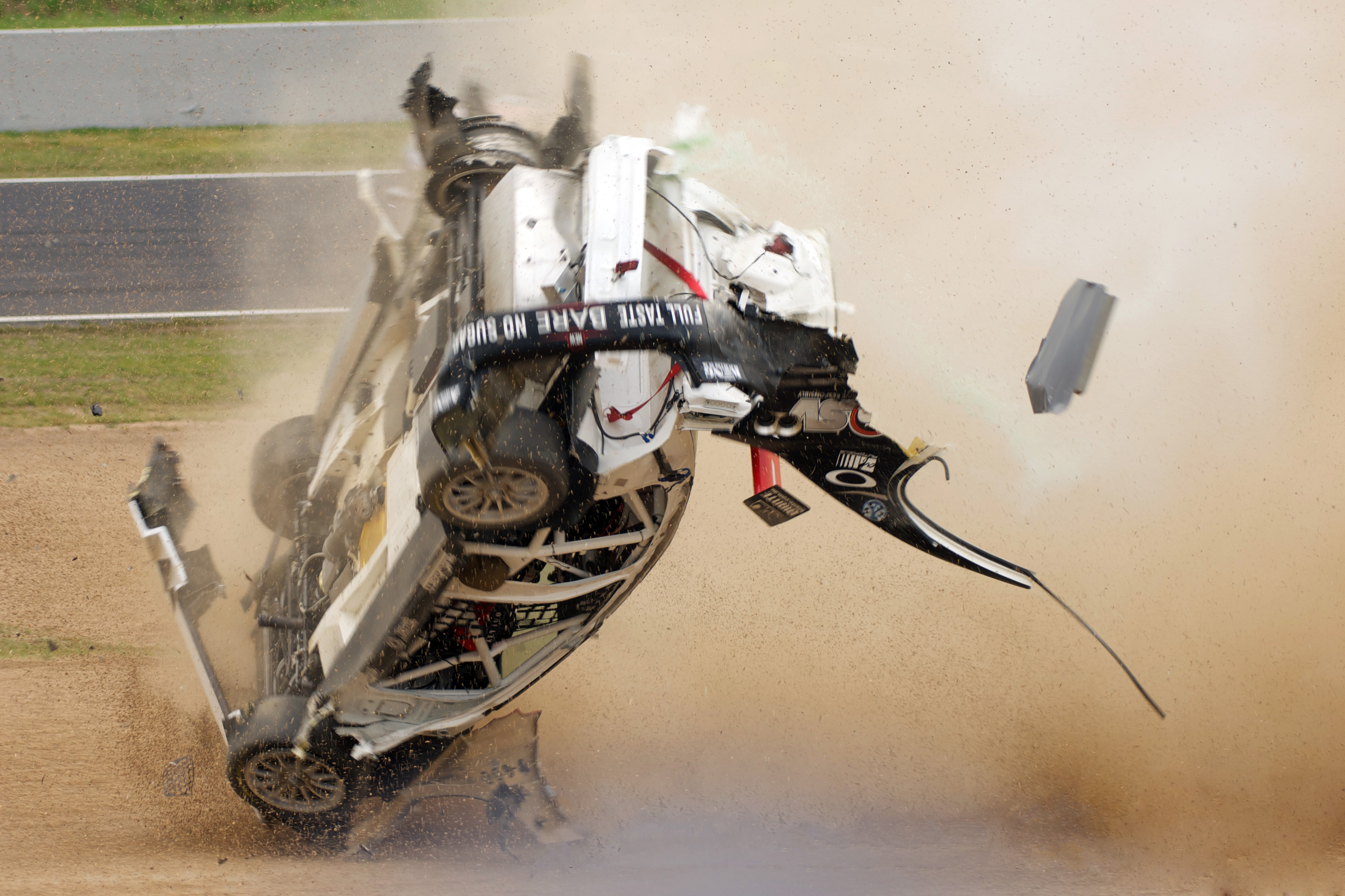

=== Brad Jones Racing ===
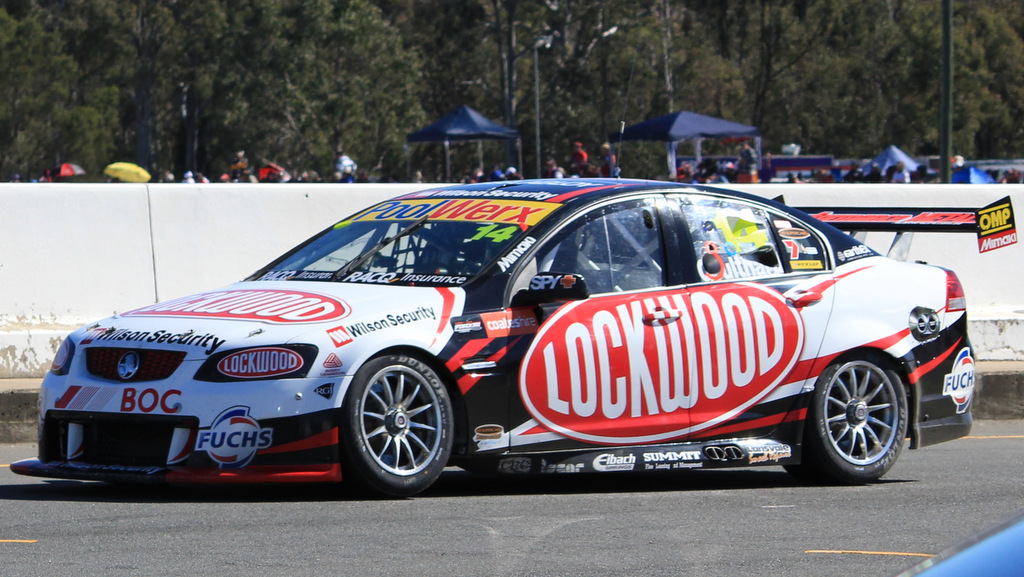
Coulthard at the 2012 Ipswich 300

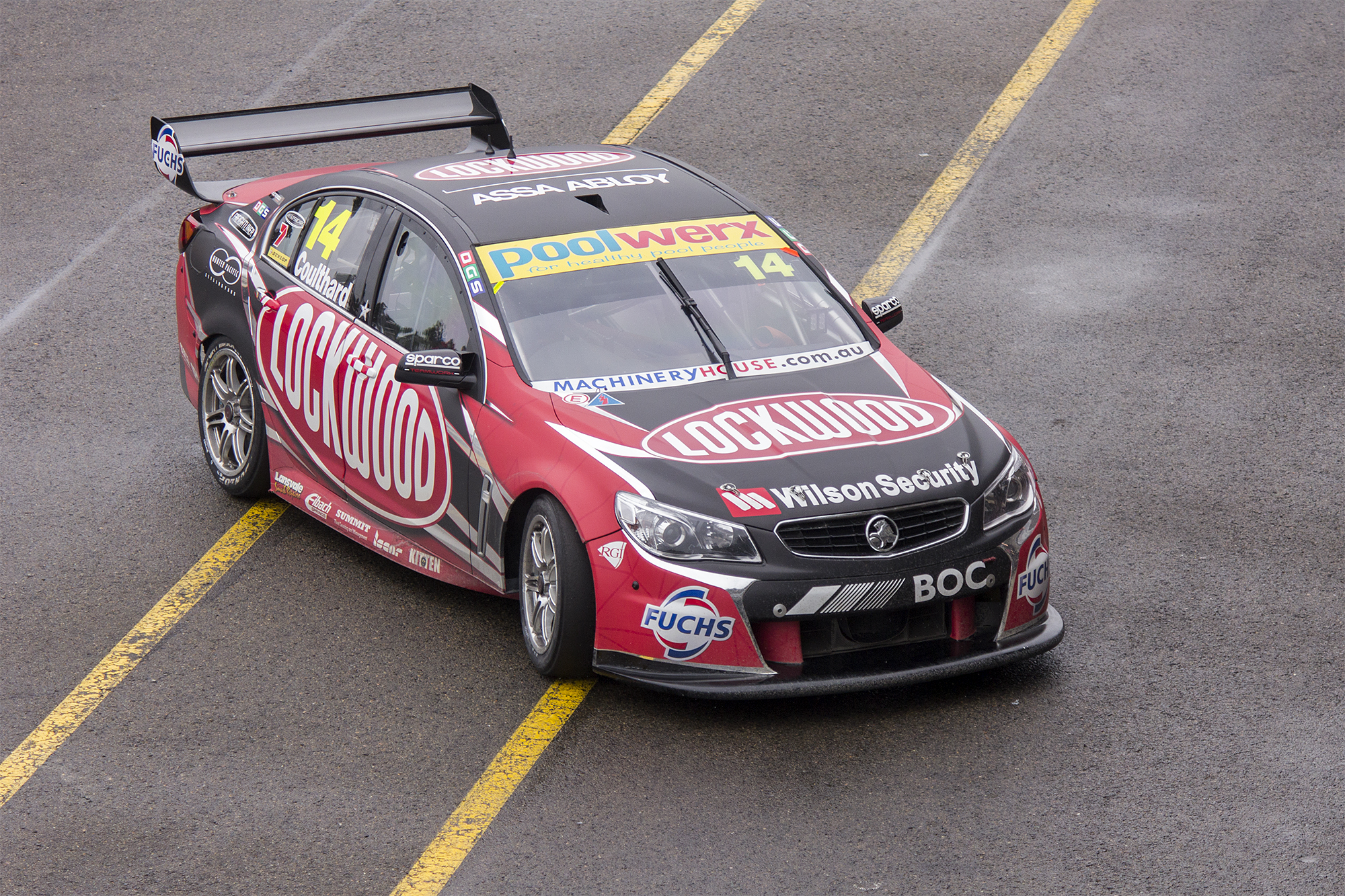
Coulthard at the 2014 V8 Supercars Test Day

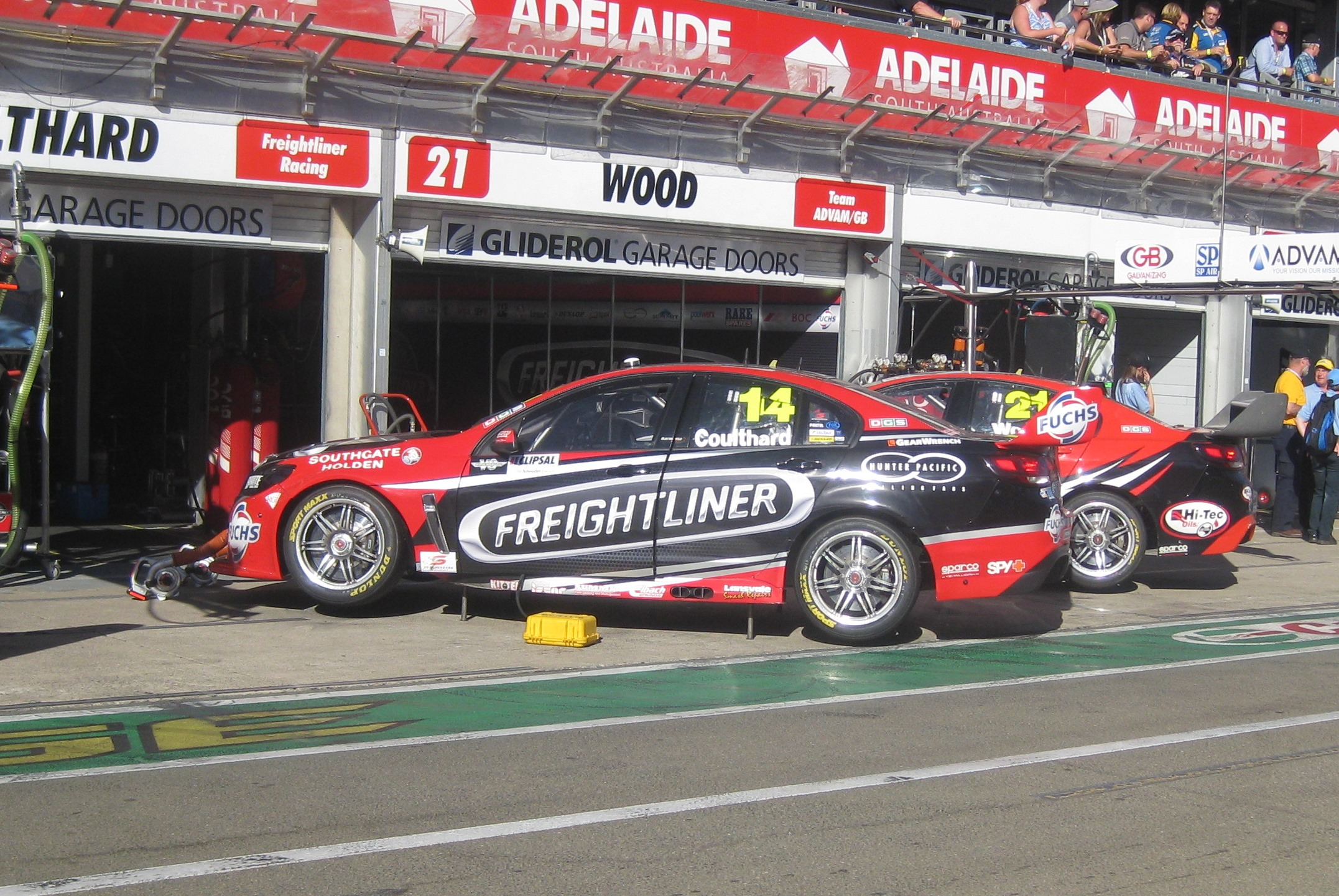
Coulthard's Holden Commodore (VF) at the 2015 Clipsal 500 Adelaide

In 2012, Coulthard left Walkinshaw Racing and moved to Brad Jones Racing. Coulthard won his first V8 Supercars race at the Symmons Plains event in 2013, he went on to win a further two races and scored nine podium finishes that year. He finished the year in sixth place. 2014 was not quite as successful for Coulthard, with only one race win and five podiums on the way to eighth in the Championship. In 2015, Coulthard opened the year strong, with a podium in the first race at the Clipsal 500 and a win in the second. He went on to score another seven podiums in the year, placing seventh in the championship.

=== DJR Team Penske ===
Coulthard left Brad Jones Racing at the end of the 2015 season to sign with DJR Team Penske, returning to a two-car squad after running only a single car in 2015. He went on to place 12th in the championship. In 2017, he won four races en route to a career best third in the championship.

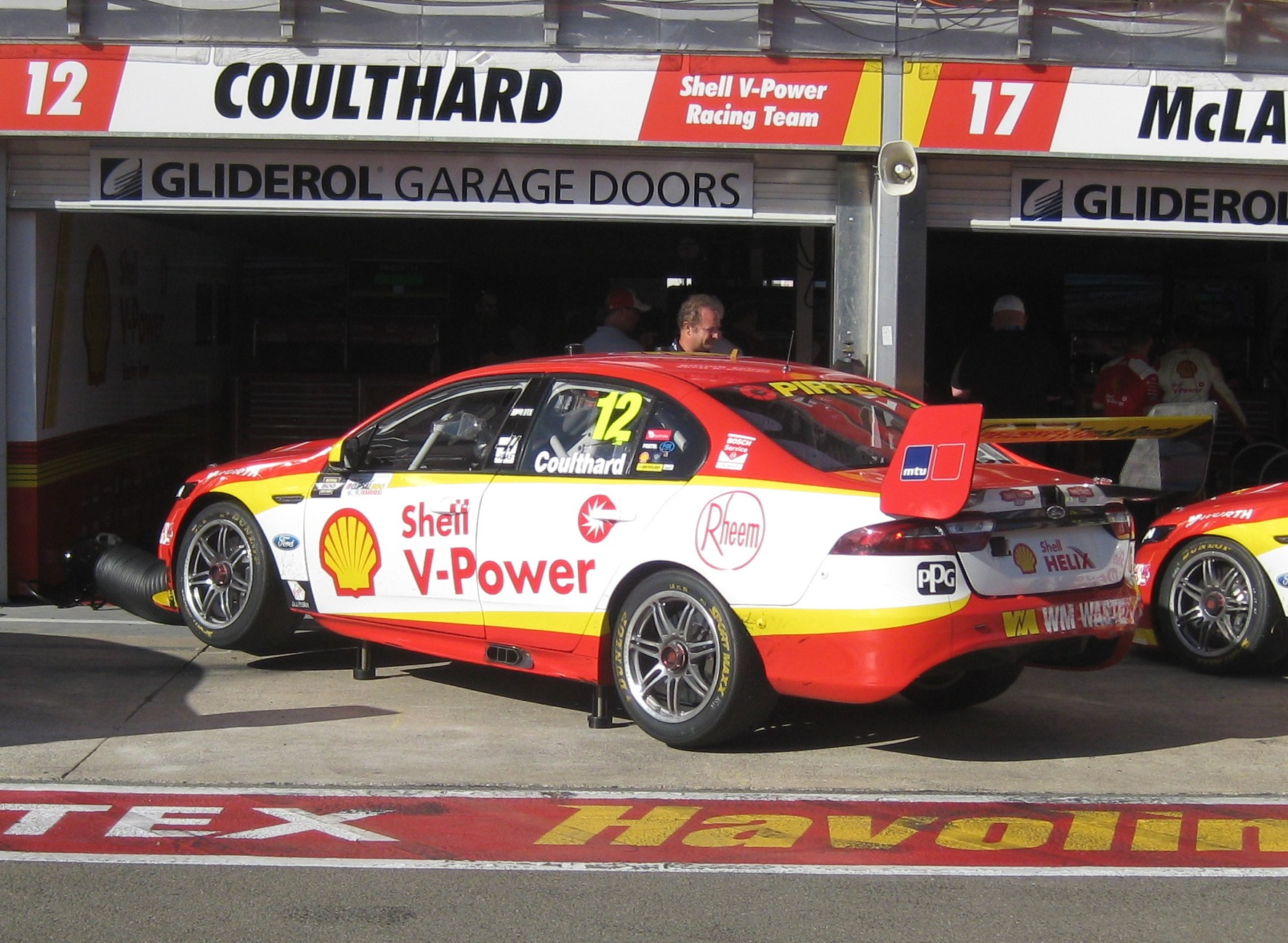
Coulthard's Shell V Power Racing Ford Falcon FG X at the 2017 Clipsal 500 Adelaide

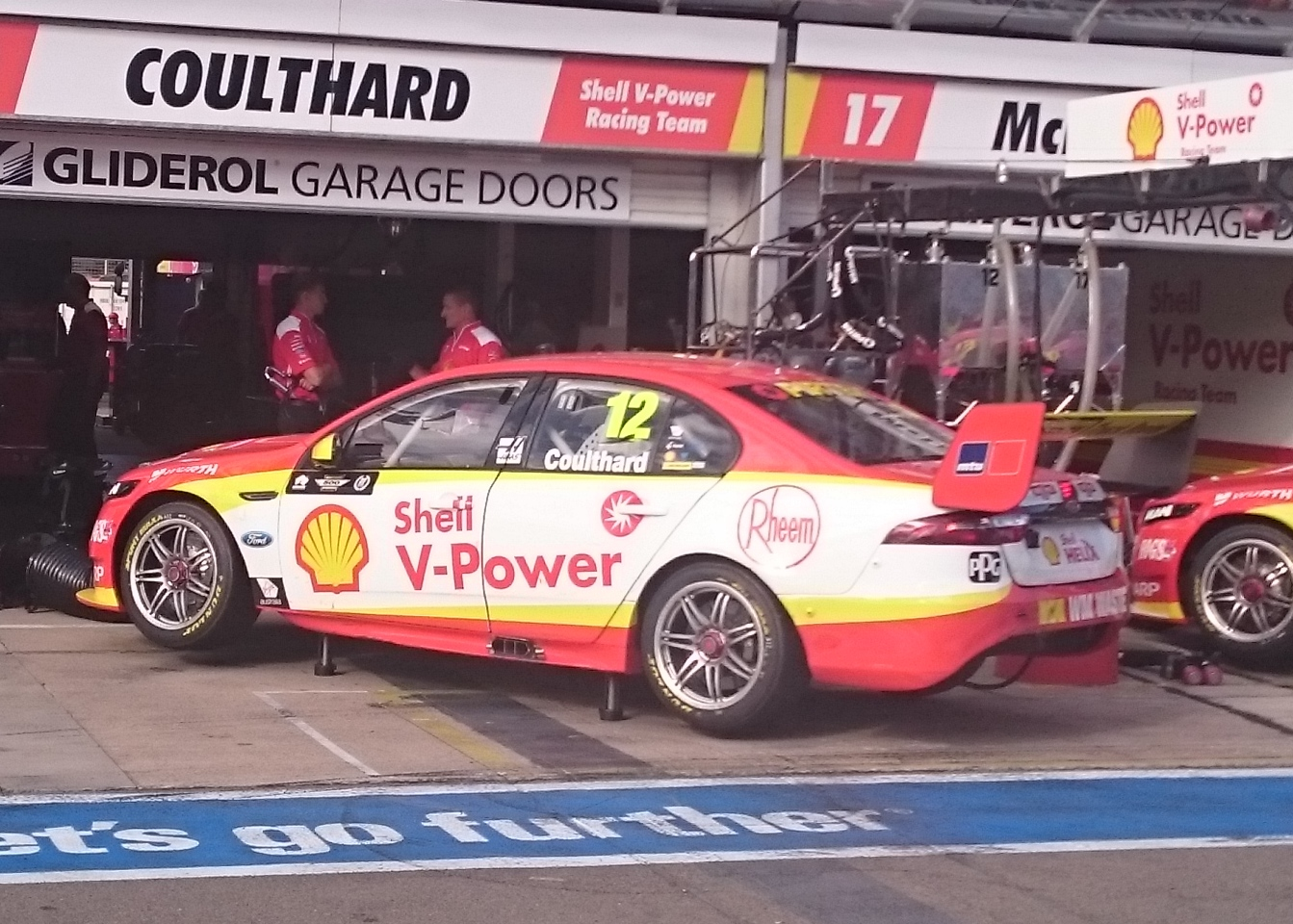
The Ford Falcon FG X of Fabian Coulthard at the 2018 Adelaide 500

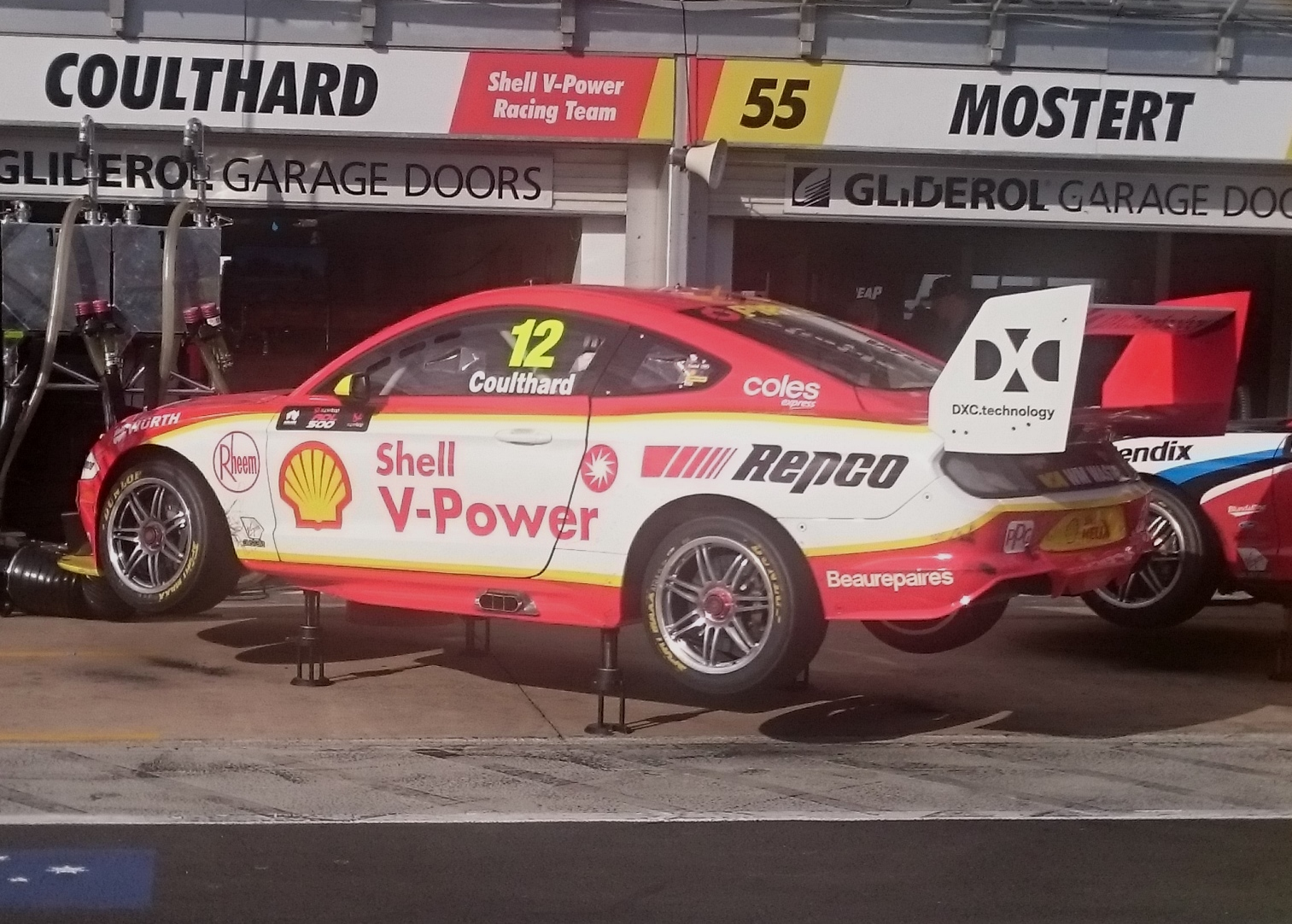
The Ford Mustang GT of Fabian Coulthard at the 2019 Adelaide 500

== Career results ==
=== Career summary ===
Season	Series	Position	Car	Team
2000/01	New Zealand Formula Ford Championship	4th	Van Diemen RF92	
2001/02	New Zealand Formula Ford Championship	**1st**	Van Diemen RF94	
2002	British Formula Renault Championship	36th	Tatuus-Renault	Manor Motorsport
2003	British Formula Renault Championship	15th	Tatuus-Renault	Manor Motorsport
2004	Australian Carrera Cup Championship	**3rd**	Porsche 996 GT3 Cup	Greg Murphy Racing
2004	V8 Supercar Championship Series	34th	Holden Commodore (VX)	Tasman Motorsport
2005	Australian Carrera Cup Championship	**1st**	Porsche 996 GT3 Cup	Greg Murphy Racing
2005	V8 Supercar Championship Series	65th	Holden Commodore (VY)	Tasman Motorsport
2006	V8 Supercar Championship Series	32nd	Holden Commodore (VZ)	Team Sirromet Wines; Team Kiwi Racing
2007	V8 Supercar Championship Series	47th	Holden Commodore (VZ)	Team Sirromet Wines
2008	V8 Supercar Championship Series	13th	Ford Falcon (BF)	Paul Cruickshank Racing
2009	V8 Supercar Championship Series	16th	Ford Falcon (FG)	Paul Cruickshank Racing
2010	V8 Supercar Championship Series	23rd	Holden Commodore (VE)	Walkinshaw Racing
2011	International V8 Supercars Championship	12th	Holden Commodore (VE)	Walkinshaw Racing
2012	V8SuperTourer Championship	30th	Holden Commodore (VE)	M3 Racing
2012	International V8 Supercars Championship	11th	Holden Commodore (VE)	Brad Jones Racing
2013	International V8 Supercars Championship	6th	Holden Commodore (VF)	Brad Jones Racing
2014	International V8 Supercars Championship	8th	Holden Commodore (VF)	Brad Jones Racing
2015	International V8 Supercars Championship	7th	Holden Commodore (VF)	Brad Jones Racing
2016	International V8 Supercars Championship	12th	Ford FG X Falcon	DJR Team Penske
2017	Supercars Championship	**3rd**	Ford FG X Falcon	DJR Team Penske
2018	Supercars Championship	9th	Ford FG X Falcon	DJR Team Penske
2019	Supercars Championship	4th	Ford Mustang S550	DJR Team Penske
2020	Supercars Championship	6th	Ford Mustang S550	DJR Team Penske
2021	Supercars Championship	24th	Holden Commodore ZB	Tekno Autosports
2022	TCR Australia Touring Car Series	20th	Honda Civic Type R TCR (FK8)	Wall Racing
2022	Supercars Championship	29th	Walkinshaw Andretti United	Holden Commodore ZB
2023	Porsche Carrera Cup Australia	7th	Porsche 911 GT3 Cup (992)	Porsche Centre Melbourne

=== Complete Formula Renault 2.0 UK Championship results ===
(key)

Year	Entrant	1	2	3	4	5	6	7	8	9	10	11	12	13	14	15	16	17	DC	Points
2002	Manor Motorsport	BRH	OUL	THR	SIL	THR	BRH	CRO	SNE	SNE	KNO	BRH; 23	DON; 18	DON; 17					36th	7
2003	Manor Motorsport	SNE; 1; 7	SNE; 2; 8	BRH; 9	THR; Ret	SIL; 1; 9	ROC; 2; 10	CRO; 1; 14	CRO; 2; 13	DON; 1 Ret	DON; 2; 6	SNE; 25	BRH; 1	BRH; 2	DON; 1	DON; 2	OUL; 1	OUL; 2	15th	98

=== Supercars Championship results ===
(key) (Races in bold indicate pole position) (Races in italics indicate fastest lap)

Supercars results
Year	Team	No.	Car	1	2	3	4	5	6	7	8	9	10	11	12	13	14	15	16	17	18	19	20	21	22	23	24	25	26	27	28	29	30	31	32	33	34	35	36	37	38	39	Position	Points
2004	Tasman Motorsport	43	Holden VY Commodore	ADE; R1	ADE; R2	EAS; R3	PUK; R4	PUK; R5	PUK; R6	HDV; R7	HDV; R8	HDV; R9	BAR; R10	BAR; R11	BAR; R12	QLD; R13	WIN; R14	ORA; R15; 29	ORA; R16; 19																								34th	330
2004	Tasman Motorsport	3	Holden VY Commodore																	SAN; R17; 9	BAT; R18; 20	SUR; R19	SUR; R20	SYM; R21	SYM; R22	SYM; R23	EAS; R24	EAS; R25	EAS; R26														34th	330
2005	Tasman Motorsport	23	Holden VZ Commodore	ADE; R1	ADE; R2	PUK; R3	PUK; R4	PUK; R5	BAR; R6	BAR; R7	BAR; R8	EAS; R9	EAS; R10	SHA; R11	SHA; R12	SHA; R13	HDV; R14	HDV; R15	HDV; R16	QLD; R17	ORA; R18	ORA; R19	SAN; R20; Ret	BAT; R21; Ret	SUR; R22	SUR; R23	SUR; R24	SYM; R25	SYM; R26	SYM; R27	PHI; R28	PHI; R29	PHI; R30										65th	0
2006	Paul Morris Motorsport	39	Holden VZ Commodore	ADE; R1	ADE; R2	PUK; R3; Ret	PUK; R4; 14	PUK; R5; 21	BAR; R6	BAR; R7	BAR; R8	WIN; R9; Ret	WIN; R10; 15	WIN; R11; 21	HDV; R12	HDV; R13	HDV; R14	QLD; R15	QLD; R16	QLD; R17	ORA; R18; 19	ORA; R19; 7	ORA; R20; Ret																				32nd	478
2006	Team Kiwi Racing	021	Holden VZ Commodore																					SAN; R21; 13	BAT; R22; Ret	SUR; R23	SUR; R24	SUR; R25	SYM; R26	SYM; R27	SYM; R28	BHR; R29	BHR; R30	BHR; R31	PHI; R32	PHI; R33	PHI; R34						32nd	478
2007	Paul Morris Motorsport	39	Holden VZ Commodore	ADE; R1; Ret	ADE; R2; 19	BAR; R3; 17	BAR; R4; 15	BAR; R5; 17	PUK; R6; 23	PUK; R7; 20	PUK; R8; 19	WIN; R9; 20	WIN; R10; 19	WIN; R11; 19	EAS; R12; Ret	EAS; R13; 17	EAS; R14; 20	HDV; R15; 22	HDV; R16; 22	HDV; R17; 25	QLD; R18	QLD; R19	QLD; R20	ORA; R21; 14	ORA; R22; 14	ORA; R23; Ret	SAN; R24; 19	BAT; R25; 16	SUR; R26	SUR; R27	SUR; R28	BHR; R29	BHR; R30	BHR; R31	SYM; R32	SYM; R33	SYM; R34	PHI; R35	PHI; R36	PHI; R37			47th	8
2008	Paul Cruickshank Racing	111	Ford BF Falcon	ADE; R1; 11	ADE; R2; 18	EAS; R3; 14	EAS; R4; 17	EAS; R5; 16	HAM; R6; 7	HAM; R7; 8	HAM; R8; 6	BAR; R29; 17	BAR; R10; 9	BAR; R11; 12	SAN; R12; 8	SAN; R13; 14	SAN; R14; Ret	HDV; R15; 14	HDV; R16; 24	HDV; R17; 22	QLD; R18; 12	QLD; R19; 8	QLD; R20; 8	WIN; R21; 19	WIN; R22; 18	WIN; R23; 9	PHI; QR; 4	PHI; R24; 16	BAT; R25; 10	SUR; R26; 14	SUR; R27; Ret	SUR; R28; 13	BHR; R29; Ret	BHR; R30; 16	BHR; R31; 7	SYM; R32; 9	SYM; R33; 10	SYM; R34; Ret	ORA; R35; 18	ORA; R36; 10	ORA; R37; 8		13th	1823
2009	Paul Cruickshank Racing	111	Ford FG Falcon	ADE; R1; 11	ADE; R2; 12	HAM; R3; 6	HAM; R4; 5	WIN; R5; 15	WIN; R6; Ret	SYM; R7; 14	SYM; R8; 3	HDV; R9; 12	HDV; R10; 20	TOW; R11; 15	TOW; R12; 19	SAN; R13; 10	SAN; R14; 15	QLD; R15; 5	QLD; R16; 23	PHI; QR; 2	PHI; R17; Ret	BAT; R18; Ret	SUR; R19; Ret	SUR; R20; 13	SUR; R21; Ret	SUR; R22; DNS	PHI; R23; 14	PHI; R24; 9	BAR; R25; 13	BAR; R26; 11	SYD; R27; 13	SYD; R28; 5											15th	1665
2010	Walkinshaw Racing	24	Holden VE Commodore	YMC; R1; 17	YMC; R2; 16	BHR; R3; 17	BHR; R4; Ret	ADE; R5; 7	ADE; R6; 27	HAM; R7; 22	HAM; R8; Ret	QLD; R9; 12	QLD; R10; 20	WIN; R11; 20	WIN; R12; Ret	HDV; R13; 23	HDV; R14; 14	TOW; R15; 14	TOW; R16; Ret	PHI; QR; 9	PHI; R17; 19	BAT; R18; Ret	SUR; R19; 17	SUR; R20; 12	SYM; R21; 27	SYM; R22; 8	SAN; R23; 28	SAN; R24; 12	SYD; R25; 5	SYD; R26; 19													23rd	1229
2011	Walkinshaw Racing	61	Holden VE Commodore	YMC; R1; 8	YMC; R2; 15	ADE; R3; 5	ADE; R4; 9	HAM; R5; 7	HAM; R6; Ret	BAR; R7; 23	BAR; R8; 11	BAR; R9; 13	WIN; R10; 10	WIN; R11; 5	HID; R12; 13	HID; R13; 18	TOW; R14; 15	TOW; R15; 8	QLD; R16; 24	QLD; R17; 18	QLD; R18; 7	PHI; QR; 10	PHI; R19; 10	BAT; R20; Ret	SUR; R21; 5	SUR; R22; 15	SYM; R23; 8	SYM; R24; 10	SAN; R25; 9	SAN; R26; 12	SYD; R27; 11	SYD; R28; Ret											12th	1839
2012	Brad Jones Racing	14	Holden VE Commodore	ADE; R1; 6	ADE; R2; 9	SYM; R3; 16	SYM; R4; 11	HAM; R5; 9	HAM; R6; 5	BAR; R7; 15	BAR; R8; 4	BAR; R9; 7	PHI; R10; 22	PHI; R11; 24	HID; R12; 24	HID; R13; 5	TOW; R14; 4	TOW; R15; Ret	QLD; R16; 4	QLD; R17; 5	SMP; R18; 12	SMP; R19; 6	SAN; QR; 18	SAN; R20; 15	BAT; R21; 23	SUR; R22; Ret	SUR; R23; 10	YMC; R24; 11	YMC; R25; 10	YMC; R26; 10	WIN; R27; 14	WIN; R28; 12	SYD; R29; Ret	SYD; R30; 15									11th	2035
2013	Brad Jones Racing	14	Holden VF Commodore	ADE; R1; 19	ADE; R2; Ret	SYM; R3; 1	SYM; R4; 3	SYM; R5; 1	PUK; R6; 5	**PUK**; **R7**; 10	PUK; R8; 3	PUK; R9; 4	BAR; R10; 27	BAR; R11; 4	BAR; R12; 7	**COA**; **R13**; 3	COA; R14; 3	COA; R15; 1	COA; R16; 2	HID; R17; 12	HID; R18; 7	HID; R19; 13	TOW; R20; 3	TOW; R21; 17	QLD; R22; 11	QLD; R23; 4	QLD; R24; 5	WIN; R25; 7	WIN; R26; 8	WIN; R27; 2	SAN; QR; 15	SAN; R28; 7	BAT; R29; 16	SUR; R30; Ret	SUR; R31; 2	PHI; R32; 2	**PHI**; **R33**; 5	PHI; R34; 5	SYD; R35; 19	SYD; R36; 15			6th	2501
2014	Brad Jones Racing	14	Holden VF Commodore	ADE; R1; 5	ADE; R2; 5	ADE; R3; 4	SYM; R4; 9	SYM; R5; 3	SYM; R6; 5	**WIN**; **R7**; 1	**WIN**; **R8**; 3	WIN; R9; 11	PUK; R10; 7	PUK; R11; 10	PUK; R12; 11	PUK; R13; 9	BAR; R14; 2	BAR; R15; 5	BAR; R16; 5	HID; R17; 9	HID; R18; 3	HID; R19; 22	TOW; R20; 15	**TOW**; **R21**; 3	TOW; R22; 14	QLD; R23; 4	QLD; R24; 9	QLD; R25; 11	SMP; R26; Ret	SMP; R27; 7	SMP; R28; 3	SAN; QR; 10	SAN; R29; 11	BAT; R30; 9	SUR; R31; 10	SUR; R32; 7	PHI; R33; 15	PHI; R34; 15	PHI; R35; 15	SYD; R36; 8	SYD; R37; 11	SYD; R38; 12	8th	2443
2015	Brad Jones Racing	14	Holden VF Commodore	ADE; R1; 3	ADE; R2; 1	ADE; R3; 6	SYM; R4; 10	SYM; R5; 10	SYM; R6; 9	BAR; R7; 8	BAR; R8; 3	BAR; R9; 3	WIN; R10; 6	WIN; R11; 21	WIN; R12; 2	HID; R13; Ret	HID; R14; 15	HID; R15; 3	TOW; R16; 3	TOW; R17; 13	QLD; R18; 10	QLD; R19; 15	QLD; R20; 14	SMP; R21; 11	SMP; R22; 2	SMP; R23; 2	SAN; QR; 9	SAN; R24; 16	BAT; R25; 4	SUR; R26; 7	SUR; R27; 13	PUK; R28; 23	PUK; R29; 9	PUK; R30; 7	PHI; R31; 12	PHI; R32; 11	PHI; R33; 11	SYD; R34; 10	SYD; R35; 14	SYD; R36; 10			7th	2542
2016	DJR Team Penske	12	Ford FG X Falcon	ADE; R1; 10	ADE; R2; 14	**ADE**; **R3**; 16	SYM; R4; 18	SYM; R5; 8	PHI; R6; 3	PHI; R7; Ret	BAR; R8; 17	BAR; R9; 15	WIN; R10; 17	WIN; R11; 3	HID; R12; 6	HID; R13; Ret	TOW; R14; 8	TOW; R15; 15	QLD; R16; 10	QLD; R17; 10	SMP; R18; 10	SMP; R19; 4	SAN; QR; 11	SAN; R20; 6	BAT; R21; 6	SUR; R22; Ret	SUR; R23; 15	PUK; R24; 11	PUK; R25; 4	PUK; R26; 5	PUK; R27; 8	SYD; R28; 11	SYD; R29; 21										12th	2078
2017	DJR Team Penske	12	Ford FG X Falcon	ADE; R1; 2	ADE; R2; 5	SYM; R3; 11	SYM; R4; 1	PHI; R5; 1	PHI; R6; 17	**BAR**; **R7**; **2**	BAR; R8; 7	WIN; R9; 3	WIN; R10; 3	HID; R11; 1	HID; R12; 4	TOW; R13; 10	TOW; R14; 21	QLD; R15; 6	QLD; R16; 5	SMP; R17; 1	SMP; R18; 2	SAN; QR; 6	SAN; R19; 5	BAT; R20; 3	SUR; R21; 19	SUR; R22; 9	PUK; R23; Ret	PUK; R24; 5	NEW; R25; 2	NEW; R26; Ret													3rd	2812
2018	DJR Team Penske	12	Ford FG X Falcon	ADE; R1; 21	ADE; R2; 16	MEL; R3; 3	MEL; R4; 3	MEL; R5; 12	MEL; R6; 6	SYM; R7; 5	SYM; R8; 17	PHI; R9; 12	PHI; R10; 4	BAR; R11; 8	BAR; R12; 16	WIN; R13; 4	WIN; R14; 1	HID; R15; 15	HID; R16; 8	TOW; R17; 5	TOW; R18; 8	QLD; R19; 5	QLD; R20; 5	SMP; R21; 11	BEN; R22; 14	BEN; R23; 14	SAN; QR; 4	SAN; R24; 7	BAT; R25; 9	SUR; R26; 11	SUR; R27; C	PUK; R28; Ret	PUK; R29; 7	NEW; R30; Ret	NEW; R31; 26								9th	2477
2019	DJR Team Penske	12	Ford Mustang S550	**ADE**; **R1**; **6**	ADE; R2; 20	MEL; R3; 2	MEL; R4; 5	MEL; R5; 5	MEL; R6; 15	SYM; R7; 2	SYM; R8; 2	PHI; R9; 2	PHI; R10; 1	BAR; R11; 1	BAR; R12; 4	WIN; R13; 15	WIN; R14; 2	HID; R15; 7	HID; R16; 3	TOW; R17; 5	TOW; R18; 2	QLD; R19; 10	QLD; R20; 18	BEN; R21; 12	BEN; R22; 10	PUK; R23; 7	PUK; R24; 12	BAT; R25; 21	SUR; R26; 9	SUR; R27; 11	SAN; QR; 6	SAN; R28; 4	NEW; R29; 3	NEW; R30; 2									4th	3058
2020	DJR Team Penske	12	Ford Mustang S550	ADE; R1; 10	ADE; R2; 9	MEL; R3; C	MEL; R4; C	MEL; R5; C	MEL; R6; C	SMP1; R7; 10	SMP1; R8; 15	SMP1; R9; Ret	SMP2; R10; 7	SMP2; R11; 2	SMP2; R12; 13	HID1; R13; 6	HID1; R14; 3	HID1; R15; 5	HID2; R16; 10	HID2; R17; 4	HID2; R18; 11	TOW1; R19; 4	TOW1; R20; 15	TOW1; R21; 17	TOW2; R22; 7	TOW2; R23; 20	TOW2; R24; 8	BEN1; R25; 1	BEN1; R26; 4	BEN1; R27; 2	BEN2; R28; 9	BEN2; R29; Ret	BEN2; R30; 8	BAT; R31; 4									6th	1800
2021	Team Sydney	19	Holden ZB Commodore	BAT1; R1; 14	BAT1; R2; 22	SAN; R3; 21	SAN; R4; 17	SAN; R5; 20	SYM; R6; 21	SYM; R7; Ret	SYM; R8; 13	BEN; R9; 20	BEN; R10; Ret	BEN; R11; 17	HID; R12; Ret	HID; R13; 16	HID; R14; 13	TOW1; R15; 21	TOW1; R16; Ret	TOW2; R17; Ret	TOW2; R18; 21	TOW2; R19; 20	SMP1; R20; 11	SMP1; R21; 23	SMP1; R22; Ret	SMP2; R23; 17	SMP2; R24; 14	SMP2; R25; 19	SMP3; R26; 16	SMP3; R27; 17	SMP3; R28; 22	SMP4; R29; 21	SMP4; R30; NC	BAT2; R31; 19									24th	936
2022	Walkinshaw Andretti United	25	Holden ZB Commodore	SMP; R1	SMP; R2	SYM; R3	SYM; R4	SYM; R5	MEL; R6	MEL; R7	MEL; R8	MEL; R9	BAR; R10	BAR; R11	BAR; R12	WIN; R13	WIN; R14	WIN; R15	HID; R16	HID; R17	HID; R18	TOW; R19	TOW; R20	BEN; R21	BEN; R22	BEN; R23	SAN; R24; PO	SAN; R25; PO	SAN; R26; PO	PUK; R27	PUK; R28	PUK; R29	BAT; R30; 2	SUR; R31	SUR; R32	ADE; R33	ADE; R34						29th	276
2023	Walkinshaw Andretti United	2	Ford Mustang S650	NEW; R1	NEW; R2	MEL; R3	MEL; R4	MEL; R5	MEL; R6	BAR; R7	BAR; R8	BAR; R9	SYM; R10	SYM; R11	SYM; R12	HID; R13	HID; R14	HID; R15	TOW; R16	TOW; R17	SMP; R18	SMP; R19	BEN; R20	BEN; R21	BEN; R22	SAN; R23; 23	BAT; R24; 14	SUR; R25	SUR; R26	ADE; R27	ADE; R28												45th	198
2024	Walkinshaw Andretti United	2	Ford Mustang S650	BAT1; R1	BAT1; R2	MEL; R3	MEL; R4	MEL; R5	MEL; R6	TAU; R7	TAU; R8	BAR; R9	BAR; R10	HID; R11	HID; R12	TOW; R13	TOW; R14	SMP; R15	SMP; R16	BEN; R17	BEN; R18	SAN; R19; 15	BAT; R20; 15	SUR; R21	SUR; R22	ADE; R23	ADE; R24																41st	240
2025	Walkinshaw Andretti United	25	Ford Mustang S650	SYD; R1	SYD; R2	SYD; R3	MEL; R4	MEL; R5	MEL; R6	MEL; R7	TAU; R8	TAU; R9	TAU; R10	SYM; R11	SYM; R12	SYM; R13	BAR; R14	BAR; R15	BAR; R16	HID; R17	HID; R18	HID; R19	TOW; R20	TOW; R21	TOW; R22	QLD; R23	QLD; R24	QLD; R25	BEN; R26; 8	BAT; R27; Ret	SUR; R28	SUR; R29	SAN; R30	SAN; R31	ADE; R32	ADE; R33	ADE; R34						32nd*	167*
2026	Walkinshaw TWG Racing	1	Toyota GR Supra	SMP; R1	SMP; R2	SMP; R3	MEL; R4	MEL; R5	MEL; R6	MEL; R7	TAU; R8	TAU; R9	TAU; R10	CHR; R11	CHR; R12	CHR; R13	SYM; R14	SYM; R15	SYM; R16	BAR; R17	BAR; R18	BAR; R19	HID; R20	HID; R21	HID; R22	TOW; R23	TOW; R24	TOW; R25	QLD; R26	QLD; R27	QLD; R28	BEN; R29	BAT; R30	SUR; R31	SUR; R32	SAN; R33	SAN; R34	ADE; R35	ADE; R36	ADE; R37				

=== Complete Bathurst 1000 results ===
Year	Team	Car	Co-driver	Position	Laps
2004	Tasman Motorsport	Holden Commodore VY	(New Zealand) Jason Richards	20th	152
2005	Tasman Motorsport	Holden Commodore VZ	(Australia) Tony D'Alberto	DNF	108
2006	Team Kiwi Racing	Holden Commodore VZ	(New Zealand) Paul Radisich	DNF	71
2007	Paul Morris Motorsport	Holden Commodore VZ	(New Zealand) Chris Pither	16th	159
2008	Paul Cruickshank Racing	Ford Falcon BF	(Australia) Alex Davison	10th	161
2009	Paul Cruickshank Racing	Ford Falcon FG	(Australia) Michael Patrizi	DNF	120
2010	Walkinshaw Racing	Holden Commodore VE	(New Zealand) Craig Baird	DNF	0
2011	Walkinshaw Racing	Holden Commodore VE	(New Zealand) Craig Baird	DNF	13
2012	Brad Jones Racing	Holden Commodore VE	(Australia) David Besnard	23rd	147
2013	Brad Jones Racing	Holden Commodore VF	(Australia) Luke Youlden	16th	161
2014	Brad Jones Racing	Holden Commodore VF	(Australia) Luke Youlden	9th	161
2015	Brad Jones Racing	Holden Commodore VF	(Australia) Luke Youlden	4th	161
2016	DJR Team Penske	Ford Falcon FG X	(Australia) Luke Youlden	6th	161
2017	DJR Team Penske	Ford Falcon FG X	(Australia) Tony D'Alberto	**3rd**	161
2018	DJR Team Penske	Ford Falcon FG X	(Australia) Tony D'Alberto	9th	161
2019	DJR Team Penske	Ford Mustang S550	(Australia) Tony D'Alberto	21st	161
2020	DJR Team Penske	Ford Mustang S550	(Australia) Tony D'Alberto	4th	161
2021	Tekno Autosports	Holden Commodore ZB	(Australia) Jonathon Webb	19th	156
2022	Walkinshaw Andretti United	Holden Commodore ZB	(Australia) Chaz Mostert	**2nd**	161
2023	Walkinshaw Andretti United	Ford Mustang S650	(Australia) Nick Percat	14th	161
2024	Walkinshaw Andretti United	Ford Mustang S650	(New Zealand) Ryan Wood	15th	161
2025	Walkinshaw Andretti United	Ford Mustang S650	(Australia) Chaz Mostert	DNF	57
2026	Walkinshaw TWG Racing	Toyota GR Supra	(Australia) Chaz Mostert	DNF	155

=== Complete Porsche Supercup results ===
(key) (Races in bold indicate pole position) (Races in italics indicate fastest lap)

Year	Team	1	2	3	4	5	6	7	8	9	10	11	12	DC	Points
2005	Porsche AG	IMO	CAT	MON	NUR	IMS	IMS	MAG	SIL; 10	HOC	HUN	MNZ	SPA	NC†	0

== See also ==
Sporting positions
Preceded by Andy Booth	Winner of the New Zealand Grand Prix; 2002	Succeeded by Jonny Reid
