= 2019 Perth SuperNight =

2019 motor racing event in Wanneroo, Western Australia

(Western Australia) 2019 Pirtek Perth SuperNight
Event Information
- Round 5 of 15 in the 2019 Supercars Championship
- Date: 2-4 May 2019
- Location: Wanneroo, Western Australia
- Venue: Barbagallo Raceway

Results
Race 1
Distance	50 laps	120.55 km
Pole position	(New Zealand) Scott McLaughlin; DJR Team Penske	52.8141
Winner	(New Zealand) Fabian Coulthard; DJR Team Penske	46:05.7716
Race 2
Distance	83 laps	200.113 km
Pole position	(New Zealand) Scott McLaughlin; DJR Team Penske	52.9052
Winner	(New Zealand) Scott McLaughlin; DJR Team Penske	01:20:03.0092

The 2019 Perth SuperNight (known for sponsorship purposes as the Pirtek Perth SuperNight) was a motor racing event for the Supercars Championship, held on 2-4 May 2019. The event was held at Barbagallo Raceway in Wanneroo, Western Australia and consisted of one race of 120 kilometres (50 laps) and one race of 200 kilometres (83 laps) in length. It was the fifth event of fifteen in the 2019 Supercars Championship and hosted Races 11 and 12 of the season.

DJR Team Penske's Fabian Coulthard won Race 11 while Scott McLaughlin won Race 12.

== Report ==
=== Background ===
The event was the fifth event of fifteen in the 2019 Supercars Championship. DJR Team Penske's Scott McLaughlin held the championship lead entering the event over teammate Fabian Coulthard and Tickford Racing's Chaz Mostert.

==== Format alterations ====
Following the 2018 Sydney SuperNight 300, the SuperNight format was moved to this event with the event reformatted to consist of one race of 120 kilometres held on Friday night and one race of 200 kilometres held on Saturday night. It marked the first time a night race had been held at the circuit.

==== Entry alterations ====
The event was open to wildcard entries which saw the grid expand to twenty-five cars. Brad Jones Racing entered an extra Holden Commodore ZB for former-full timer Tim Blanchard, marking his return to the category after retiring at the end of 2018.

==== Technical alterations ====
Following a review by the category into parity between models, the Ford Mustang GT underwent changes to its aerodynamics package. An all new rear-wing endplate design was constructed with the rear-wing gurney flap and undertray also modified with existing parts to fit the new regulations. The changes were completed by the Ford teams in time for the event.
