= David Besnard =

Australian racing driver

- Nationality: (Australia) Australian
- Born: 21 January 1977 (age 49) Sydney, Australia

Supercars Championship career
- Championships: 0
- Races: 151
- Wins: 2
- Podiums: 8
- Pole positions: 0

David John Besnard (born 21 January 1977 in Sydney, Australia) is an Australian retired professional racing driver.

== Career history ==
Starting in karts in 1991, Besnard quickly proceeded into Formula Ford in 1995. After initial success, he had a major accident at Eastern Creek Raceway and broke his leg. In 1996 he made a comeback and won the Australian title. He made a venture to the United States, with a small budget, and limited success. In 1998, he returned to win the U.S F2000 National Championship. 1999 saw Besnard enter the US Formula Atlantic Championship. After a heavy crash at Nazareth Speedway, the team had to buy a new chassis and ran out of budget halfway through the season. 2000 saw Besnard again in the United States, running various Sports Car races, until Stone Brothers Racing picked him up for the Konica V8 Supercar Series and the Bathurst 1000. From there he drove with Stone Brothers for several seasons, with the highlight being winning the 2002 Queensland 500 with Simon Wills. He raced with Ford Performance Racing for one season in 2003, and WPS Racing for three seasons following that.

In 2004, with his links with WPS, a drive in the Champ Car World Series came about at Surfers Paradise. His finishing position of seventh is still the highest finish for an Australian at that event (but bettered by Ryan Briscoe's 2008 IRL win after the CCWS collapsed). After being dropped by WPS in 2006, Besnard has been racing in the New Zealand Touring Car Championship, picking up an endurance race co-driver role with Stone Brothers Racing in 2007, paired with James Courtney, which resulted in a second place at Bathurst.

== Motorsports career results ==
=== Karting career summary ===
Season	Series	Position
1992	CIK-FIA Karting European Championship - Junior A	**1st**
1992	FIA Karting World Championship - Junior A	30th
1993	FIA Karting World Championship - Formula A	15th
1993	World Cup Karting - Formula A	8th
1993	Andrea Margutti Trophy - ICA	13th

=== Career summary ===
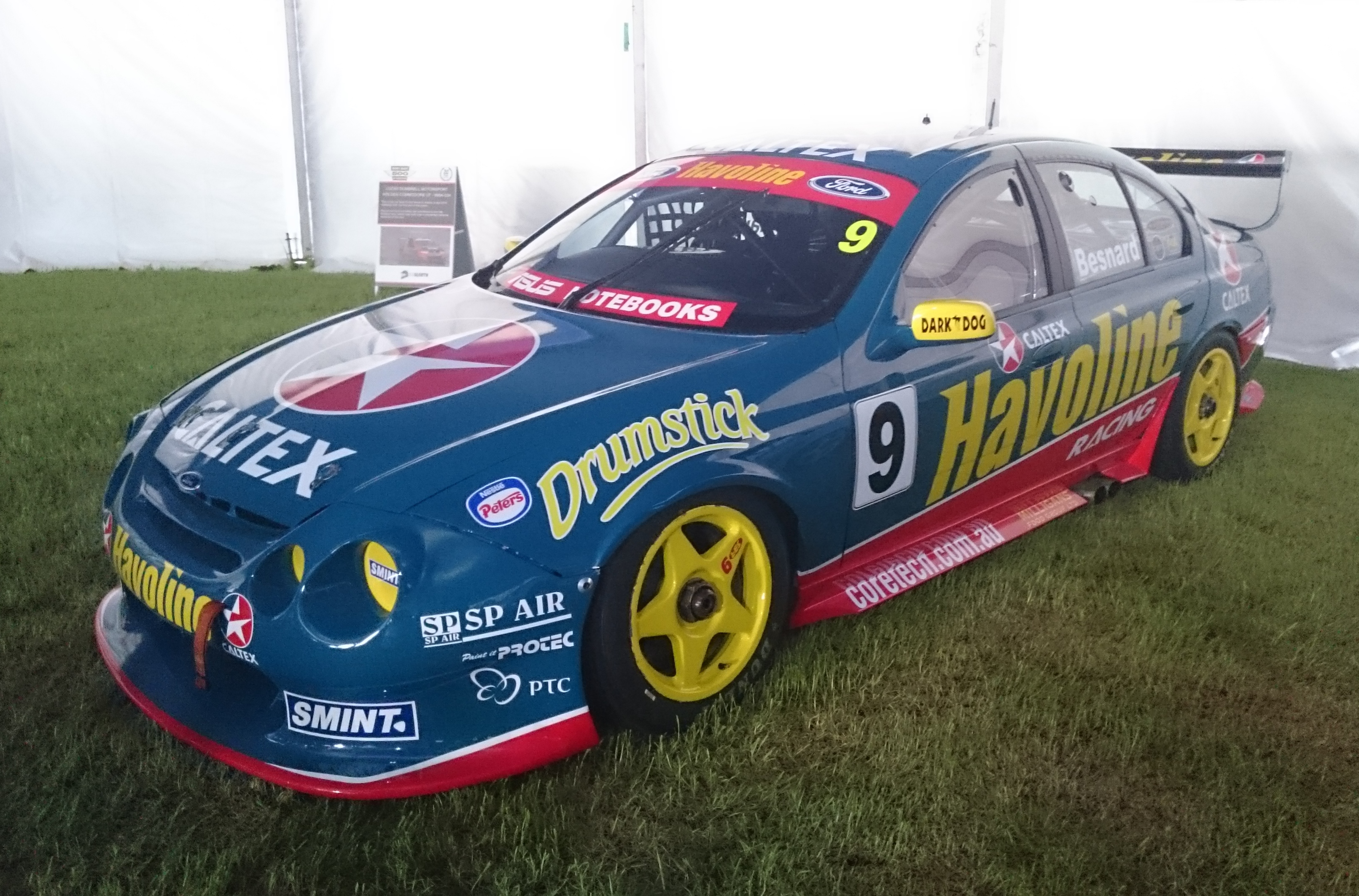
Besnard placed eighth in the 2002 V8 Supercar Championship Series driving a Ford Falcon AU. The car is pictured in 2018.

Season	Series	Position	Car	Team
1995	Australian Formula Ford Championship	26th	Van Diemen RF90 – Ford	David Besnard
1996	Australian Formula Ford Championship	**1st**	Van Diemen RF96 – Ford	David Besnard
1998	United States Formula Ford 2000 Championship	**1st**	Van Diemen RF98 - Ford	Van Diemen USA
1998	United States Formula Ford 2000 Oval Crown	**1st**	Van Diemen RF98 - Ford	Van Diemen USA
1998	GrandAm Sportscar Series	43rd	Riley & Scott - Ford	Transatlantic Racing
1999	United States Formula Atlantic Series	15th	Swift 008.a - Toyota	Hylton Motorsports
2000	GrandAm Sportscar Series	83rd	Riley & Scott - Lincoln	Dyson Racing
2000	Konica V8 Lites Series	5th	Ford EL Falcon	Stone Brothers Racing
2000	Shell Championship Series	40th	Ford AU Falcon	Stone Brothers Racing
2001	Shell Championship Series	23rd	Ford AU Falcon	Stone Brothers Racing
2002	V8 Supercar Championship Series	8th	Ford AU Falcon	Stone Brothers Racing
2003	V8 Supercar Championship Series	21st	Ford AU Falcon; Ford BA Falcon	Ford Performance Racing
2004	V8 Supercar Championship Series	30th	Ford BA Falcon	WPS Racing
2004	Champ Car World Series	20th	Reynard 03i Ford Cosworth	Walker Racing
2005	V8 Supercar Championship Series	25th	Ford BA Falcon	WPS Racing
2006	V8 Supercar Championship Series	45th	Ford BA Falcon	WPS Racing
2006/07	New Zealand Touring Car Championship	4th	Ford BA Falcon	
2007	V8 Supercar Championship Series	27th	Ford BF Falcon	Stone Brothers Racing
2008	V8 Supercar Championship Series	30th	Ford BF Falcon	Stone Brothers Racing
2009	V8 Supercar Championship Series	33rd	Holden VE Commodore	Garry Rogers Motorsport
2010	V8 Supercar Championship Series	47th	Holden VE Commodore	Garry Rogers Motorsport
2010	Fujitsu V8 Supercar Series	30th	Ford BF Falcon	Peters Motorsport
2011	International V8 Supercars Championship	76th	Ford FG Falcon	Dick Johnson Racing
2012	International V8 Supercars Championship	49th	Holden VE Commodore	Brad Jones Racing

=== Complete New Zealand Grand Prix results ===
Year	Team	Car	Qualifying	Main race
2007	(Australia) David Besnard	Tatuus TT104ZZ - Toyota	7th	15th

=== GrandAm Championship ===
Year	Team	Car	Class	1	2	3	4	5	6	7	8	9	Rank	Points
1998	Transatlantic Racing	Riley & Scott - Ford	CA	D24	HOM	MID	MIN	WGL; 5					43rd	26
2000	Dyson Racing	Riley & Scott - Lincoln	SA	D24	PHX	HOM; 9	LRK	MID	DAY	RAM	CTR	WGL	83rd	22

=== Complete American open-wheel racing results ===
(key)

==== Atlantic Championship ====
Year	Team	1	2	3	4	5	6	7	8	9	10	11	12	Rank	Points	Ref
1999	Hylton Motorsports	LBH; 7	NAZ; 11	GAT	MIL	MTL; 7	ROA	TRR	MOH	CHI	VAN	LS	HOU	15th	16	

==== Champ Car World Series ====
Year	Team	No.	Chassis	Engine	1	2	3	4	5	6	7	8	9	10	11	12	13	14	Rank	Points	Ref
2004	Walker Racing	15	Reynard 02i	Ford XFE V8t	LBH	MTY	MIL	POR	CLE	TOR	VAN	ROA	DEN	MTL	LS	LVS	SRF; 7	MXC	**20th**	**18**	

=== Supercars Championship results ===
(Races in bold indicate pole position) (Races in italics indicate fastest lap)

Supercars results
Year	Team	Car	1	2	3	4	5	6	7	8	9	10	11	12	13	14	15	16	17	18	19	20	21	22	23	24	25	26	27	28	29	30	31	32	33	34	35	36	37	38	39	Position	Points
2000	Stone Brothers Racing	Ford AU Falcon	PHI; R1	PHI; R2	BAR; R3	BAR; R4	BAR; R5	ADE; R6	ADE; R7	EAS; R8	EAS; R9	EAS; R10	HDV; R11	HDV; R12	HDV; R13	CAN; R14	CAN; R15	CAN; R16	QLD; R17	QLD; R18	QLD; R19	WIN; R20	WIN; R21	WIN; R22	ORA; R23	ORA; R24	ORA; R25	CAL; R26	CAL; R27	CAL; R28	QLD; R29; 8	SAN; R30	SAN; R31	SAN; R32	BAT; R33; Ret							40th	96
2001	Stone Brothers Racing	Ford AU Falcon	PHI; R1; 29	PHI; R2; 18	ADE; R3; Ret	ADE; R4; Ret	EAS; R5; 19	EAS; R6; Ret	HDV; R7; 7	HDV; R8; 5	HDV; R9; 7	CAN; R10; 15	CAN; R11; Ret	CAN; R12; Ret	BAR; R13; 20	BAR; R14; 28	BAR; R15; 22	CAL; R16; 7	CAL; R17; 16	CAL; R18; 26	ORA; R19; 3	ORA; R20; 2	QLD; R21; Ret	WIN; R22; 24	WIN; R23; 14	BAT; R24; Ret	PUK; R25; 22	PUK; R26; Ret	PUK; R27; 21	SAN; R28; 14	SAN; R29; 14	SAN; R30; 15										23rd	1153
2002	Stone Brothers Racing	Ford AU Falcon	ADE; R1; Ret	ADE; R2; 22	PHI; R3; 5	PHI; R4; 23	EAS; R5; 7	EAS; R6; 18	EAS; R7; 15	HDV; R8; 9	HDV; R9; 5	HDV; R10; 7	CAN; R11; 5	CAN; R12; 15	CAN; R13; 5	BAR; R14; 7	BAR; R15; 7	BAR; R16; 2	ORA; R17; 19	ORA; R18; 6	WIN; R19; 11	WIN; R20; 8	QLD; R21; 1	BAT; R22; Ret	SUR; R23; Ret	SUR; R24; 9	PUK; R25; 13	PUK; R26; 23	PUK; R27; Ret	SAN; R28; 3	SAN; R29; 7											8th	988
2003	Ford Performance Racing	Ford AU Falcon	ADE; R1; Ret	ADE; R1; Ret	PHI; R3; Ret	EAS; R4; 13	WIN; R5; 24	BAR; R6; 20	BAR; R7; 20	BAR; R8; Ret	HDV; R9; 24	HDV; R10; 18	HDV; R11; 28	QLD; R12; 11	ORA; R13; 13	SAN; R14; 8	BAT; R15; Ret	SUR; R16; 7	SUR; R17; Ret	PUK; R18; 25	PUK; R19; 15	PUK; R20; Ret	EAS; R21; 28	EAS; R22; 11																		21st	1059
2004	WPS Racing	Ford BA Falcon	ADE; R1; 18	ADE; R2; 14	EAS; R3; 17	PUK; R4; 23	PUK; R5; 23	PUK; R6; 25	HDV; R7; 19	HDV; R8; 28	HDV; R9; Ret	BAR; R10; Ret	BAR; R11; Ret	BAR; R12; 22	QLD; R13; 19	WIN; R14; Ret	ORA; R15; 26	ORA; R16; 30	SAN; R17; 16	BAT; R18; Ret	SUR; R19	SUR; R20	SYM; R21; 8	SYM; R22; 29	SYM; R23; 1	EAS; R24; 4	EAS; R25; 20	EAS; R26; 21														30th	790
2005	WPS Racing	Ford BA Falcon	ADE; R1; 18	ADE; R2; 23	PUK; R3; 29	PUK; R4; 27	PUK; R5; Ret	BAR; R6; 17	BAR; R7; 12	BAR; R8; 20	EAS; R9; 30	EAS; R10; 24	SHA; R11; Ret	SHA; R12; Ret	SHA; R13; Ret	HDV; R14; Ret	HDV; R15; 29	HDV; R16; 25	QLD; R17; 13	ORA; R18; 19	ORA; R19; 16	SAN; R20; 19	BAT; R21; 8	SUR; R22; 12	SUR; R23; 30	SUR; R24; 21	SYM; R25; 24	SYM; R26; 25	SYM; R27; 31	PHI; R28; Ret	PHI; R29; 25	PHI; R30; 20										25th	904
2006	WPS Racing	Ford BA Falcon	ADE; R1	ADE; R2	PUK; R3	PUK; R4	PUK; R5	BAR; R6	BAR; R7	BAR; R8	WIN; R9	WIN; R10	WIN; R11	HDV; R12	HDV; R13	HDV; R14	QLD; R15	QLD; R16	QLD; R17	ORA; R18	ORA; R19	ORA; R20	SAN; R21; 11	BAT; R22; 14	SUR; R23	SUR; R24	SUR; R25	SYM; R26	SYM; R27	SYM; R28	BHR; R29	BHR; R30	BHR; R31	PHI; R32	PHI; R33	PHI; R34						45th	220
2007	Stone Brothers Racing	Ford BF Falcon	ADE; R1	ADE; R2	BAR; R3	BAR; R4	BAR; R5	PUK; R6	PUK; R7	PUK; R8	WIN; R9	WIN; R10	WIN; R11	EAS; R12	EAS; R13	EAS; R14	HDV; R15	HDV; R16	HDV; R17	QLD; R18	QLD; R19	QLD; R20	ORA; R21	ORA; R22	ORA; R23	SAN; R24; 16	BAT; R25; 2	SUR; R26	SUR; R27	SUR; R28	BHR; R29	BHR; R30	BHR; R31	SYM; R32	SYM; R33	SYM; R34	PHI; R35	PHI; R36	PHI; R37			27th	60
2008	Stone Brothers Racing	Ford BF Falcon	ADE; R1	ADE; R2	EAS; R3	EAS; R4	EAS; R5	HAM; R6	HAM; R7	HAM; R8	BAR; R9	BAR; R10	BAR; R11	SAN; R12	SAN; R13	SAN; R14	HDV; R15	HDV; R16	HDV; R17	QLD; R18	QLD; R19	QLD; R20	WIN; R21	WIN; R22	WIN; R23	PHI; Q 13	PHI; R24; 6	BAT; R25; 3	SUR; R26	SUR; R27	SUR; R28	BHR; R29	BHR; R30	BHR; R31	SYM; R32	SYM; R33	SYM; R34	ORA; R35	ORA; R36	ORA; R37		30th	459
2009	Garry Rogers Motorsport	Holden VE Commodore	ADE; R1	ADE; R2	HAM; R3	HAM; R4	WIN; R5	WIN; R6	SYM; R7	SYM; R8	HDV; R9	HDV; R10	TOW; R11	TOW; R12	SAN; R13	SAN; R14	QLD; R15	QLD; R16	PHI; Q 5	PHI; R17; 13	BAT; R18; 9	SUR; R19	SUR; R20	SUR; R21	SUR; R22	PHI; R23	PHI; R24	BAR; R25	BAR; R26	SYD; R27	SYD; R28											33rd	306
2010	Garry Rogers Motorsport	Holden VE Commodore	YMC; R1	YMC; R2	BHR; R3	BHR; R4	ADE; R5	ADE; R6	HAM; R7	HAM; R8	QLD; R9	QLD; R10	WIN; R11	WIN; R12	HDV; R13	HDV; R14	TOW; R15	TOW; R16	PHI; R17; Ret	BAT; R18; 7	SUR; R19	SUR; R20	SYM; R21	SYM; R22	SAN; R23	SAN; R24	SYD; R25	SYD; R26														47th	233
2011	Dick Johnson Racing	Ford FG Falcon	YMC; R1	YMC; R2	ADE; R3	ADE; R4	HAM; R5	HAM; R6	BAR; R7	BAR; R8	BAR; R9	WIN; R10	WIN; R11	HID; R12	HID; R13	TOW; R14	TOW; R15	QLD; R16	QLD; R17	QLD; R18	PHI; R19; 26	BAT; R20; Ret	SUR; R21	SUR; R22	SYM; R23	SYM; R24	SAN; R25	SAN; R26	SYD; R27	SYD; R28												76th	66
2012	Brad Jones Racing	Holden VE Commodore	ADE; R1	ADE; R2	SYM; R3	SYM; R4	HAM; R5	HAM; R6	BAR; R7	BAR; R8	BAR; R9	PHI; R10	PHI; R11	HID; R12	HID; R13	TOW; R14	TOW; R15	QLD; R16	QLD; R17	SMP; R18	SMP; R19	SAN; QR; 23	SAN; R20; 15	BAT; R21; 23	SUR; R22	SUR; R23	YMC; R24	YMC; R25	YMC; R26	WIN; R27	WIN; R28	SYD; R29	SYD; R30									49th	181

=== Complete Bathurst 1000 results ===
Year	Car#	Team	Car	Co-driver	Position	Laps
2000	9	Stone Brothers Racing	Ford AU Falcon	(Australia) Tony Longhurst	DNF	151
2001	9	Stone Brothers Racing	Ford AU Falcon	(Australia) Matthew White	DNF	84
2002	5	Glenn Seton Racing	Ford AU Falcon	(Australia) Glenn Seton (Australia) Owen Kelly‡	DNF	102
2002	9	Stone Brothers Racing	Ford AU Falcon	(Australia) Wayne Gardner	DNS	
2003	19	Ford Performance Racing	Ford BA Falcon	(Australia) Owen Kelly	DNF	115
2004	23	WPS Racing	Ford BA Falcon	(New Zealand) John McIntyre	DNF	99
2005	48	WPS Racing	Ford BA Falcon	(New Zealand) Craig Baird	8th	158
2006	8	WPS Racing	Ford BA Falcon	(Brazil) Max Wilson	14th	160
2007	4	Stone Brothers Racing	Ford BF Falcon	(Australia) James Courtney	**2nd**	161
2008	4	Stone Brothers Racing	Ford BF Falcon	(Australia) James Courtney	**3rd**	161
2009	33	Garry Rogers Motorsport	Holden VE Commodore	(Australia) Greg Ritter	9th	161
2010	33	Garry Rogers Motorsport	Holden VE Commodore	(Australia) Lee Holdsworth	7th	161
2011	17	Dick Johnson Racing	Ford FG Falcon	(Australia) Steven Johnson	DNF	112
2012	14	Brad Jones Racing	Holden VE Commodore	(New Zealand) Fabian Coulthard	23rd	147

‡ Besnard replaced Kelly due to illness

Sporting positions
Preceded by Jordi Suralles	CIK-FIA Karting European Championship; Champion; 1992	Succeeded by Miloš Pavlović
Preceded by Jason Bright	Australian Formula Ford Championship; Champion; 1996	Succeeded by Garth Tander
Preceded by Zak Morioka	United States Formula Ford 2000 Championship; Champion; 1998	Succeeded by Dan Wheldon
