= Dean Canto =

Australian motor racing driver

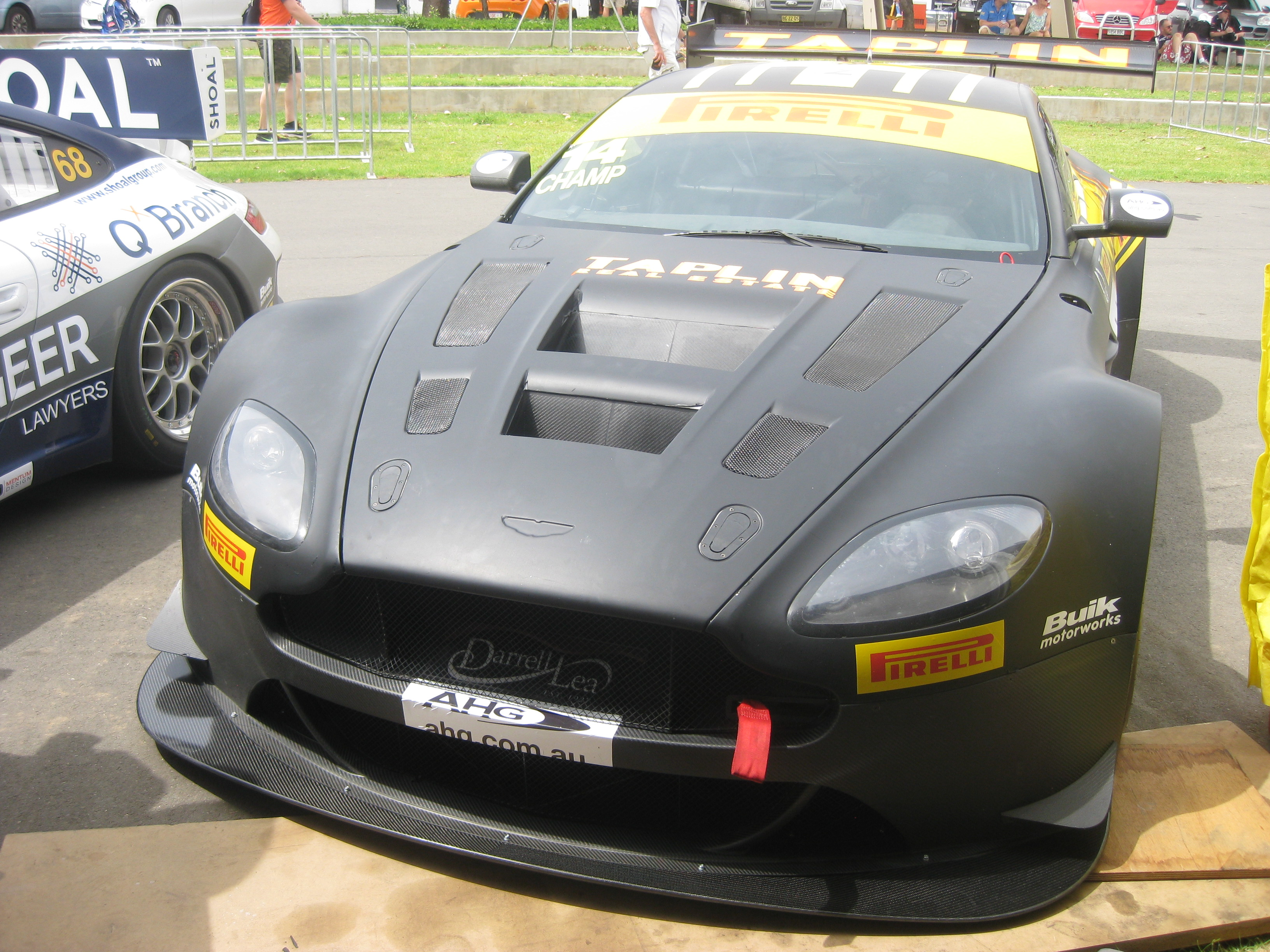
- Nationality: Australian
- Born: Dean Justin Canto; 24 September 1980 (age 46) Sydney, New South Wales
- Categorisation: FIA Silver (until 2017, 2019–); FIA Gold (2018)

Supercars Championship career
- Championships: 0
- Races: 156
- Wins: 2
- Podiums: 5
- Pole positions: 0
- 2019 position: 44th (326 pts)

Dean Justin Canto (born 24 September 1980) is a multiple-championship winning Australian motor racing driver. Best noted as a Supercars driver, Canto was the inaugural winner of the second-tier V8 Supercar development series in 2000, and the first to become a multiple-champion five years later. Canto has been a regular in the main Supercars Championship for a variety of teams racing both full-time and as a part-time endurance race co-driver.

== Racing career ==
After winning a national and two state titles in kart racing, Canto graduated to the Australian GT Production Car Championship and finished the Championship in 11th overall, and second within Class B in which his Subaru Impreza WRX raced. He then backed up this performance with a victory in the 1998 Sandown 1 Hour driving a Maserati Ghibli co-driving with Alfredo Costanzo. Another second in class placing followed in 1999 driving a Ford Mondeo in the Independents class of the Australian Super Touring Championship.

Later that year, Canto made his V8 Supercar début in the Shell Championship Series at Oran Park Raceway then went on to drive in the Queensland 500 and Bathurst Classic as well as racing his Mondeo at the Bathurst 1000.

In 2000, Canto won the inaugural Konica V8 Lites Series driving a Ford EL Falcon under the banner of Dean Canto Racing. In 2001, Canto drove with Ford Tickford Racing at the Queensland 500 and Bathurst 1000. He achieved a ninth placing in the Queensland 500 and fifth with teammate Jim Richards in the Bathurst 1000. Canto added another title with his victory in the Young Guns races at the Honda IndyCar Carnival, a one-make event for emerging young drivers in road specification Honda Integras.

In 2002, Canto became co-driver to Max Wilson at Briggs Motor Sport and in 2003, achieved a full-time drive with the same team. Canto was diagnosed with Alopecia Universalis, a very rare medical condition that causes rapid hair loss to the body. Medical advice reassured Canto that the condition would, in no way, affect his overall health. With concerns allayed, Canto then took the time to adjust to the condition, renew his confidence and focus, stronger than ever, on more driving success.

In the later half of the 2003 season, Canto pulled off a number of strong performances and top 10 finishes and was awarded the VIP Top Dog award, however it was not enough for Canto to keep his full-time drive. Canto was retained as the endurance race co-driver with team under its new ownership identity of Triple Eight Race Engineering for the 2004 season.

The following year, Dick Johnson Racing appointed Canto to drive the Gatorz Racing Development Series Ford Falcon. The season proved a success. Canto won five of the seven rounds, qualified on pole position on six of seven occasions, won nine of the ten races where he started on the front row of the grid and won ten races in total. Canto's times were so fast that he could qualify in the Supercars Top 20 (even though the Development cars had a 100 kg lead weight disadvantage). He set new Development Series lap records at Adelaide and Wakefield Park and new qualifying lap records at the Clipsal 500 and Queensland rounds. At the season's conclusion he became the first driver ever to win two Development Series Championships.

Canto proved once again his worth as an endurance driver teaming up with Glenn Seton at the endurance rounds in a DJR Falcon. The pair finished ninth at Bathurst even with an engine misfire.

Canto's performance in 2005 caught the attention of Garry Rogers Motorsport team Principal Garry Rogers. He asked Canto to fill the vacant seat of the #34 Valvoline Repco Cummins VZ Commodore for the Indy 300 and Tasmanian rounds of the V8 Supercar Championship Series. The car finished well and both team and driver realised that a longer-term relationship would be beneficial for team and driver. Canto signed a multi-year deal with GRM as the team's lead driver for their assault on the 2006 V8 Supercar Championship Series.

The 2006 series saw Canto achieve his first win in the main category, the reverse grid race at Barbagallo Raceway. After a difficult 2007 season, Canto's GRM contract was cut leaving Canto without a full-time drive in 2008. Canto returned to the Development series with Howard Racing but just missed out on his third title, finishing second to Steve Owen.

Since then, Canto has competed as an endurance co-driver with Ford Performance Racing under its numerous banners from 2008 to 2018. His time there included a second place at the Bathurst 1000 in 2012, and a win at the Gold Coast 600 in 2014, both alongside long time teammate, David Reynolds.

In 2019, Canto competed in his 21st Bathurst 1000 alongside Macauley Jones at Brad Jones Racing.

== Career results ==
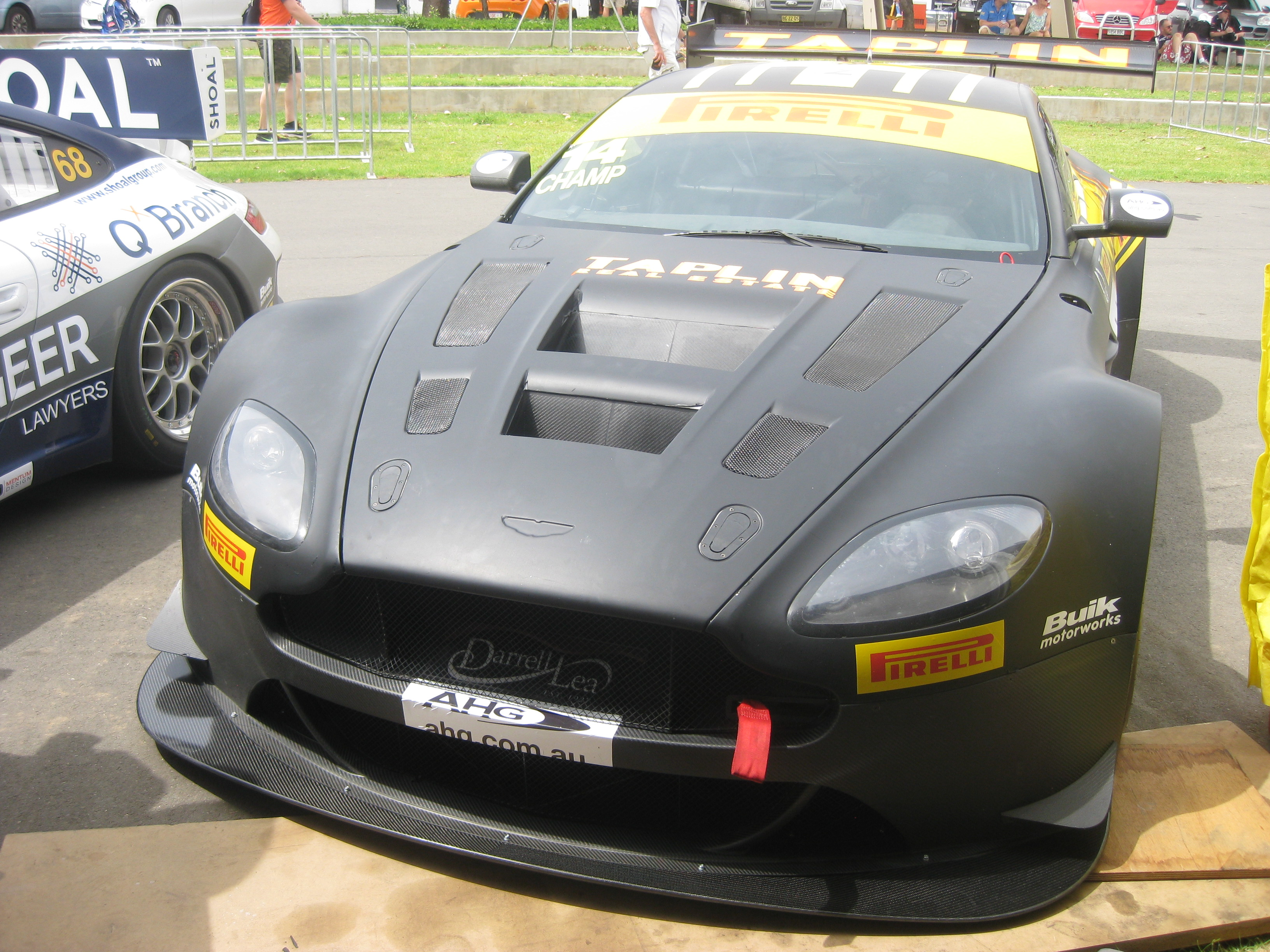
The VIP Holdings Aston Martin V12 Vantage GT3 Dean Canto drove at the opening round of the 2015 Australian GT Championship

Season	Series	Position	Car	Team
1998	Australian GT Production Car Championship	11th	Subaru Impreza WRX	Edge Motor Sport
1999	Australian Super Touring Championship	7th	Ford Mondeo	Knight Racing
2000	Konica V8 Lites Series	**1st**	Ford EL Falcon	Dean Canto Racing
2001	Shell Championship Series	32nd	Ford AU Falcon	RPM International Racing; Glenn Seton Racing
2002	V8 Supercar Championship Series	44th	Ford AU Falcon	Briggs Motor Sport
2003	V8 Supercar Championship Series	24th	Ford BA Falcon	Team Betta Electrical
2005	V8 Supercar Championship Series	35th	Ford BA Falcon; Holden VZ Commodore	Dick Johnson Racing; Garry Rogers Motorsport
2005	HPDC V8 Supercar Series	**1st**	Ford BA Falcon	Dick Johnson Racing
2006	V8 Supercar Championship Series	17th	Holden VZ Commodore	Garry Rogers Motorsport
2007	V8 Supercar Championship Series	16th	Holden VE Commodore	Garry Rogers Motorsport
2008	Fujitsu V8 Supercar Series	**2nd**	Ford BA Falcon	Howard Racing
2008	V8 Supercar Championship Series	38th	Ford BF Falcon	Ford Performance Racing
2009	V8 Supercar Championship Series	52nd	Ford FG Falcon	Ford Performance Racing
2010	V8 Supercar Championship Series	41st	Ford FG Falcon	Rod Nash Racing
2010	Australian Mini Challenge	13th	Mini John Cooper Works Challenge	
2011	International V8 Supercars Championship	71st	Ford FG Falcon	Rod Nash Racing
2011	V8 Utes Racing Series	36th	Holden VE Ute	
2012	V8SuperTourer Championship	26th	Ford FG Falcon	International Motorsport
2012	International V8 Supercars Championship	31st	Ford FG Falcon	Rod Nash Racing
2013	International V8 Supercars Championship	35th	Ford FG Falcon	Rod Nash Racing
2014	International V8 Supercars Championship	44th	Ford FG Falcon	Rod Nash Racing
2015	International V8 Supercars Championship	28th	Ford FG X Falcon; Mercedes-Benz E63 AMG	Rod Nash Racing; Erebus Motorsport
2016	International V8 Supercars Championship	47th	Ford FG X Falcon	Prodrive Racing Australia
2017	Virgin Australia Supercars Championship	43rd	Ford FG X Falcon	Prodrive Racing Australia
2018	Virgin Australia Supercars Championship	38th	Ford FG X Falcon	Tickford Racing
2019	Virgin Australia Supercars Championship	44th	Holden ZB Commodore	Tim Blanchard Racing

=== Super2 Series results ===
(key) (Races in bold indicate pole position) (Races in italics indicate fastest lap)

Super2 Series results
Year	Team	No.	Car	1	2	3	4	5	6	7	8	9	10	11	12	13	14	15	16	17	18	Position	Points
2000	Dean Canto Racing	45	Ford EL Falcon	EAS; R1; 3	EAS; R2; 2	EAS; R3; 1	PHI; R4; 5	PHI; R5; 4	PHI; R6; 2	ORA; R7; 1	**ORA**; **R8**; 3	ORA; R9; 1	LAK; R10; 3	LAK; R11; 1	**LAK**; **R12**; 10	MAL; R13; 2	MAL; R14; 1	**MAL**; **R15**; 2				1st	229
2005	Dick Johnson Racing	17	Ford BA Falcon	**ADE**; **R1**; 1	**ADE**; **R2**; 1	**WAK**; **R3**; 1	**WAK**; **R4**; DNS	WAK; R5; DNS	**EAS**; **R6**; 1	**EAS**; **R7**; 3	EAS; R8; 1	**QLD**; **R9**; 1	**QLD**; **R10**; 5	QLD; R11; 1	MAL; R12; 1	**MAL**; **R13**; 3	MAL; R14; 1	**BAT**; **R15**; 1	BAT; R16; C	**PHI**; **R17**; 2	PHI; R18; 2	1st	1098
2008	Howard Racing	37	Ford BA Falcon	**ADE**; **R1**; Ret	ADE; R2; 10	WAK; R3; 2	WAK; R4; 27	WAK; R5; 1	**SAN**; **R6**; 2	SAN; R7; 11	SAN; R8; 2	**QLD**; **R9**; 1	**QLD**; **R10**; 2	QLD; R11; 1	WIN; R12; 1	**WIN**; **R13**; 4	WIN; R14; 7	BAT; R15; 2	BAT; R16; 1	ORA; R17; 1	**ORA**; **R18**; 3	2nd	1621

=== Supercars Championship results ===
(key) (Races in bold indicate pole position) (Races in italics indicate fastest lap)

Supercars results
Year	Team	No.	Car	1	2	3	4	5	6	7	8	9	10	11	12	13	14	15	16	17	18	19	20	21	22	23	24	25	26	27	28	29	30	31	32	33	34	35	36	37	38	39	Position	Points
1999	Owen Parkinson Racing	98	Holden VS Commodore	EAS; R1	EAS; R2	EAS; R3	ADE; R4	BAR; R5	BAR; R6	BAR; R7	PHI; R8	PHI; R9	PHI; R10	HDV; R11	HDV; R12	HDV; R13	SAN; R14	SAN; R15	SAN; R16	QLD; R17	QLD; R18	QLD; R19	CAL; R20	CAL; R21	CAL; R22	SYM; R23	SYM; R24	SYM; R25	WIN; R26	WIN; R27	WIN; R28	ORA; R29; DNQ	ORA; R30; DNQ	ORA; R31; DNQ									87th	6
1999	Graphic Skills Racing	97	Holden VS Commodore																																QLD; R32; 25	BAT; R33; Ret							87th	6
2000	Dean Canto Racing	45	Ford EL Falcon	PHI; R1	PHI; R2	BAR; R3	BAR; R4	BAR; R5	ADE; R6; 22	ADE; R7; 25	EAS; R8	EAS; R9	EAS; R10	HDV; R11	HDV; R12	HDV; R13	CAN; R14	CAN; R15	CAN; R16	QLD; R17	QLD; R18	QLD; R19	WIN; R20	WIN; R21	WIN; R22	ORA; R23	ORA; R24	ORA; R25	CAL; R26	CAL; R27	CAL; R28												NC	0
2000	Glenn Seton Racing	6	Ford AU Falcon																													QLD; R29; Ret	SAN; R30	SAN; R31	SAN; R32								NC	0
2000	Dean Canto Racing	45	Ford AU Falcon																																	BAT; R33; Ret							NC	0
2001	Dean Canto Racing	45	Ford AU Falcon	PHI; R1; DNQ	PHI; R2; DNQ	ADE; R3; 10	ADE; R4; Ret	EAS; R5; 27	EAS; R6; 25	HDV; R7	HDV; R8	HDV; R9	CAN; R10	CAN; R11	CAN; R12	BAR; R13	BAR; R14	BAR; R15	CAL; R16; DNS	CAL; R17; 24	CAL; R18; 27	ORA; R19	ORA; R20																				32nd	743
2001	Glenn Seton Racing	6	Ford AU Falcon																					QLD; R21; 8	WIN; R22	WIN; R23	BAT; R24; 5	PUK; R25	PUK; R26	PUK; R27	SAN; R28	SAN; R29	SAN; R30										32nd	743
2002	Briggs Motorsport	65	Ford AU Falcon	ADE; R1	ADE; R2	PHI; R3	PHI; R4	EAS; R5	EAS; R6	EAS; R7	HDV; R8	HDV; R9	HDV; R10	CAN; R11	CAN; R12	CAN; R13	BAR; R14	BAR; R15	BAR; R16	ORA; R17	ORA; R18	WIN; R19	WIN; R20	QLD; R21; Ret	BAT; R22; Ret	SUR; R23	SUR; R24																44th	86
2002	Briggs Motorsport	600	Ford AU Falcon																									PUK; R25; 24	PUK; R26; 25	PUK; R27; 5	SAN; R28; 17	SAN; R29; 22											44th	86
2003	Briggs Motorsport	66	Ford BA Falcon	ADE; R1; 20	ADE; R1; Ret	PHI; R3; 29	EAS; R4; 23	WIN; R5; 23	BAR; R6; 27	BAR; R7; 22	BAR; R8; 26	HDV; R9; 18	HDV; R10; 12	HDV; R11; 19	QLD; R12; 22	ORA; R13; 10																											24th	1001
2003	Triple Eight Race Engineering	66	Ford BA Falcon														SAN; R14; 14	BAT; R15; Ret	SUR; R16; Ret	SUR; R17; 24	PUK; R18; 17	PUK; R19; 14	PUK; R20; 25	EAS; R21; 15	EAS; R22; 9																		24th	1001
2004	Triple Eight Race Engineering	888	Ford BA Falcon	ADE; R1	ADE; R2	EAS; R3	PUK; R4	PUK; R5	PUK; R6	HDV; R7	HDV; R8	HDV; R9	BAR; R10	BAR; R11	BAR; R12	QLD; R13	WIN; R14	ORA; R15	ORA; R16	SAN; R17; Ret	BAT; R18; Ret	SUR; R19	SUR; R20	SYM; R21	SYM; R22	SYM; R23	EAS; R24	EAS; R25	EAS; R26														NC	0
2005	Dick Johnson Racing	18	Ford BA Falcon	ADE; R1	ADE; R2	PUK; R3	PUK; R4	PUK; R5	BAR; R6	BAR; R7	BAR; R8	EAS; R9	EAS; R10	SHA; R11	SHA; R12	SHA; R13	HDV; R14	HDV; R15	HDV; R16	QLD; R17	ORA; R18	ORA; R19	SAN; R20; 12	BAT; R21; 9																			35th	312
2005	Garry Rogers Motorsport	34	Holden VZ Commodore																						SUR; R22; 20	SUR; R23; 17	SUR; R24; 13	SYM; R25; 29	SYM; R26; 20	SYM; R27; 23	PHI; R28	PHI; R29	PHI; R30										35th	312
2006	Garry Rogers Motorsport	34	Holden VZ Commodore	ADE; R1; 20	ADE; R2; 18	PUK; R3; 16	PUK; R4; 21	PUK; R5; Ret	BAR; R6; 22	BAR; R7; 1	BAR; R8; 22	WIN; R9; 22	WIN; R10; 3	WIN; R11; 20	HDV; R12; 14	HDV; R13; 19	HDV; R14; 20	QLD; R15; 16	QLD; R16; 15	QLD; R17; 13	ORA; R18; 16	ORA; R19; 24	ORA; R20; 19	SAN; R21; 6	BAT; R22; 17	SUR; R23; 18	SUR; R24; 25	SUR; R25; 16	SYM; R26; 10	SYM; R27; 20	SYM; R28; 17	BHR; R29; 24	BHR; R30; 13	BHR; R31; 17	PHI; R32; 13	PHI; R33; 14	PHI; R34; 10						17th	2024
2007	Garry Rogers Motorsport	34	Holden VE Commodore	ADE; R1; 12	ADE; R2; 18	BAR; R3; 27	BAR; R4; 25	BAR; R5; 28	PUK; R6; 25	PUK; R7; 17	PUK; R8; Ret	WIN; R9; 19	WIN; R10; 23	WIN; R11; 14	EAS; R12; 16	EAS; R13; Ret	EAS; R14; DNS	HDV; R15; 9	HDV; R16; 11	HDV; R17; 15	QLD; R18; 16	QLD; R19; 15	QLD; R20; 13	ORA; R21; 18	ORA; R22; 23	ORA; R23; Ret	SAN; R24; 5	BAT; R25; Ret	SUR; R26; 9	SUR; R27; 14	SUR; R28; Ret	BHR; R29; 13	BHR; R30; 7	BHR; R31; 9	SYM; R32; 20	SYM; R33; 12	SYM; R34; 10	PHI; R35; 20	PHI; R36; 16	PHI; R37; 14			16th	125
2008	Ford Performance Racing	5	Ford BF Falcon	ADE; R1	ADE; R2	EAS; R3	EAS; R4	EAS; R5	HAM; R6	HAM; R7	HAM; R8	BAR; R9	BAR; R10	BAR; R11	SAN; R12	SAN; R13	SAN; R14	HDV; R15	HDV; R16	HDV; R17	QLD; R18	QLD; R19	QLD; R20	WIN; R21	WIN; R22	WIN; R23	PHI; R24; 24	BAT; R25; 7	SUR; R26	SUR; R27	SUR; R28	BHR; R29	BHR; R30	BHR; R31	SYM; R32	SYM; R33	SYM; R34	ORA; R35	ORA; R36	ORA; R37			38th	252
2009	Ford Performance Racing	5	Ford FG Falcon	ADE; R1	ADE; R2	HAM; R3	HAM; R4	WIN; R5	WIN; R6	SYM; R7	SYM; R8	HDV; R9	HDV; R10	TOW; R11	TOW; R12	SAN; R13	SAN; R14	QLD; R15	QLD; R16	PHI; Q 8	PHI; R17; 9	BAT; R18; Ret	SUR; R19	SUR; R20	SUR; R21	SUR; R22	PHI; R23	PHI; R24	BAR; R25	BAR; R26	SYD; R27	SYD; R28											52nd	152
2010	Rod Nash Racing	55	Ford FG Falcon	YMC; R1	YMC; R2	BHR; R3	BHR; R4	ADE; R5	ADE; R6	HAM; R7	HAM; R8	QLD; R9	QLD; R10	WIN; R11	WIN; R12	HDV; R13	HDV; R14	TOW; R15	TOW; R16	PHI; R17; 7	BAT; R18; 14	SUR; R19	SUR; R20	SYM; R21	SYM; R22	SAN; R23	SAN; R24	SYD; R25	SYD; R26														41st	309
2011	Rod Nash Racing	55	Ford FG Falcon	YMC; R1	YMC; R2	ADE; R3	ADE; R4	HAM; R5	HAM; R6	BAR; R7	BAR; R8	BAR; R9	WIN; R10	WIN; R11	HID; R12	HID; R13	TOW; R14	TOW; R15	QLD; R16	QLD; R17	QLD; R18	PHI; R19; 23	BAT; R20; Ret	SUR; R21	SUR; R22	SYM; R23	SYM; R24	SAN; R25	SAN; R26	SYD; R27	SYD; R28												71st	109
2012	Rod Nash Racing	55	Ford FG Falcon	ADE; R1	ADE; R2	SYM; R3	SYM; R4	HAM; R5	HAM; R6	BAR; R7	BAR; R8	BAR; R9	PHI; R10	PHI; R11	HID; R12	HID; R13	TOW; R14	TOW; R15	QLD; R16	QLD; R17	SMP; R18	SMP; R19	SAN; QR; 3	SAN; R20; 6	BAT; R21; 2	SUR; R22	SUR; R23	YMC; R24	YMC; R25	YMC; R26	WIN; R27	WIN; R28	SYD; R29	SYD; R30									31st	527
2013	Rod Nash Racing	55	Ford FG Falcon	ADE; R1	ADE; R2	SYM; R3	SYM; R4	SYM; R5	PUK; R6	PUK; R7	PUK; R8	PUK; R9	BAR; R10	BAR; R11	BAR; R12	COA; R13	COA; R14	COA; R15	COA; R16	HID; R17	HID; R18	HID; R19	TOW; R20	TOW; R21	QLD; R22	QLD; R23	QLD; R24	WIN; R25	WIN; R26	WIN; R27	SAN; R28; 17	BAT; R29; 9	SUR; R30; 8	**SUR**; **R31**; **1**	PHI; R32	PHI; R33	PHI; R34	SYD; R35	SYD; R36				35th	516
2014	Rod Nash Racing	55	Ford FG Falcon	ADE; R1	ADE; R2	ADE; R3	SYM; R4	SYM; R5	SYM; R6	WIN; R7	WIN; R8	WIN; R9	PUK; R10	PUK; R11	PUK; R12	PUK; R13	BAR; R14	BAR; R15	BAR; R16	HID; R17	HID; R18	HID; R19	TOW; R20	TOW; R21	TOW; R22	QLD; R23	QLD; R24	QLD; R25	SMP; R26	SMP; R27	SMP; R28	SAN; Q 8	SAN; R29; 9	BAT; R30; Ret	SUR; R31; Ret	SUR; R32; 6	PHI; R33	PHI; R34	PHI; R35	SYD; R36	SYD; R37	SYD; R38	44th	270
2015	Rod Nash Racing	55	Ford FG X Falcon	ADE; R1	ADE; R2	ADE; R3	SYM; R4	SYM; R5	SYM; R6	BAR; R7	BAR; R8	BAR; R9	WIN; R10	WIN; R11	WIN; R12	HID; R13	HID; R14	HID; R15	TOW; R16	TOW; R17	QLD; R18	QLD; R19	QLD; R20	SMP; R21	SMP; R22	SMP; R23	SAN; Q 4	SAN; R24; 5	**BAT**; **R25**; **6**	SUR; R26; 2	SUR; R27; 9	PUK; R28	PUK; R29	PUK; R30	PHI; R31	PHI; R32	PHI; R33	SYD; R34	SYD; R35	SYD; R36			28th	648
2016	Prodrive Racing Australia	1	Ford FG X Falcon	ADE; R1	ADE; R2	ADE; R3	SYM; R4	SYM; R5	PHI; R6	PHI; R7	BAR; R8	BAR; R9	WIN; R10	WIN; R11	HID; R12	HID; R13	TOW; R14	TOW; R15	QLD; R16	QLD; R17	SMP; R18	SMP; R19	SAN; Q 24	SAN; R20; 23	BAT; R21; Ret	SUR; R22; 4	SUR; R23; 5	PUK; R24	PUK; R25	PUK; R26	PUK; R27	SYD; R28	SYD; R29										47th	303
2017	Prodrive Racing Australia	5	Ford FG X Falcon	ADE; R1	ADE; R2	SYM; R3	SYM; R4	PHI; R5	PHI; R6	BAR; R7	BAR; R8	WIN; R9	WIN; R10	HID; R11	HID; R12	TOW; R13	TOW; R14	QLD; R15	QLD; R16	SMP; R17	SMP; R18	SAN; R19; 9	BAT; R20; Ret	SUR; R21; 8	SUR; R22; 5	PUK; R23	PUK; R24	NEW; R25	NEW; R26														43rd	369
2018	Tickford Racing	5	Ford FG X Falcon	ADE; R1	ADE; R2	MEL; R3	MEL; R4	MEL; R5	MEL; R6	SYM; R7	SYM; R8	PHI; R9	PHI; R10	BAR; R11	BAR; R12	WIN; R13; PO	WIN; R14; PO	HID; R15	HID; R16	TOW; R17	TOW; R18	QLD; R19; PO	QLD; R20; PO	SMP; R21	BEN; R22	BEN; R23	SAN; R24; 17	BAT; R25; 12	SUR; R26; 7	SUR; R27; C	PUK; R28	PUK; R29	NEW; R30	NEW; R31									38th	342
2019	Tim Blanchard Racing	21	Holden ZB Commodore	ADE; R1	ADE; R2	MEL; R3	MEL; R4	MEL; R5	MEL; R6	SYM; R7; PO	SYM; R8; PO	PHI; R9	PHI; R10	BAR; R11	BAR; R12	WIN; R13	WIN; R14	HID; R15	HID; R16	TOW; R17	TOW; R18	QLD; R19	QLD; R20	BEN; R21; PO	BEN; R22; PO	PUK; R23	PUK; R24	BAT; R25; 16	SUR; R26; 17	SUR; R27; 15	SAN; QR; 22	SAN; R28; 18	NEW; R29	NEW; R30									44th	326

=== Complete Bathurst 1000 results ===
Year	Team	Car	Co-driver	Position	Laps
1999	Graphic Skills Racing	Holden Commodore VS	(Australia) Wayne Wakefield	DNF	46
2000	Dean Canto Racing	Ford Falcon AU	(Australia) Ian Moncreiff	DNF	56
2001	Glenn Seton Racing	Ford Falcon AU	(New Zealand) Jim Richards	5th	161
2002	Briggs Motor Sport	Ford Falcon AU	(Brazil) Max Wilson	DNF	108
2003	Triple Eight Race Engineering	Ford Falcon BA	(Australia) Matthew White	DNF	147
2004	Triple Eight Race Engineering	Ford Falcon BA	(France) Yvan Muller	DNF	138
2005	Dick Johnson Racing	Ford Falcon BA	(Australia) Glenn Seton	9th	158
2006	Garry Rogers Motorsport	Holden Commodore VZ	(Australia) Lee Holdsworth	17th	129
2007	Garry Rogers Motorsport	Holden Commodore VE	(Australia) Lee Holdsworth	DNF	118
2008	Ford Performance Racing	Ford Falcon BF	(Australia) Luke Youlden	7th	161
2009	Ford Performance Racing	Ford Falcon FG	(Australia) Luke Youlden	DNF	139
2010	Rod Nash Racing	Ford Falcon FG	(Australia) Paul Dumbrell	14th	161
2011	Rod Nash Racing	Ford Falcon FG	(Australia) Paul Dumbrell	DNF	144
2012	Rod Nash Racing	Ford Falcon FG	(Australia) David Reynolds	**2nd**	161
2013	Rod Nash Racing	Ford Falcon FG	(Australia) David Reynolds	9th	161
2014	Rod Nash Racing	Ford Falcon FG	(Australia) David Reynolds	DNF	117
2015	Rod Nash Racing	Ford Falcon FG X	(Australia) David Reynolds	6th	161
2016	Prodrive Racing Australia	Ford Falcon FG X	(Australia) Mark Winterbottom	DNF	132
2017	Prodrive Racing Australia	Ford Falcon FG X	(Australia) Mark Winterbottom	DNF	159
2018	Tickford Racing	Ford Falcon FG X	(Australia) Mark Winterbottom	12th	161
2019	Tim Blanchard Racing	Holden Commodore ZB	(Australia) Macauley Jones	16th	160

Sporting positions
Preceded by inaugural	Winner of the Konica V8 Lites Series; 2000	Succeeded by Simon Wills
Preceded by Andrew Jones	Winner of the HPDC V8 Supercar Series; 2005	Succeeded by Adam Macrow
