= 2000 Australian Drivers' Championship =

Seasons
- ← 1999 2001 →

The 2000 Australian Drivers' Championship was a CAMS sanctioned national motor racing title for drivers of cars conforming to Formula Holden regulations. The title was contested over an 8-round, 16 race series with the winner awarded the 2000 CAMS Gold Star. The championship, which was promoted as the 2000 Holden Australian Drivers' Championship, was the 44th Australian Drivers' Championship and the 12th to be contested with Formula Holden or Formula Brabham cars.

== Teams and drivers ==
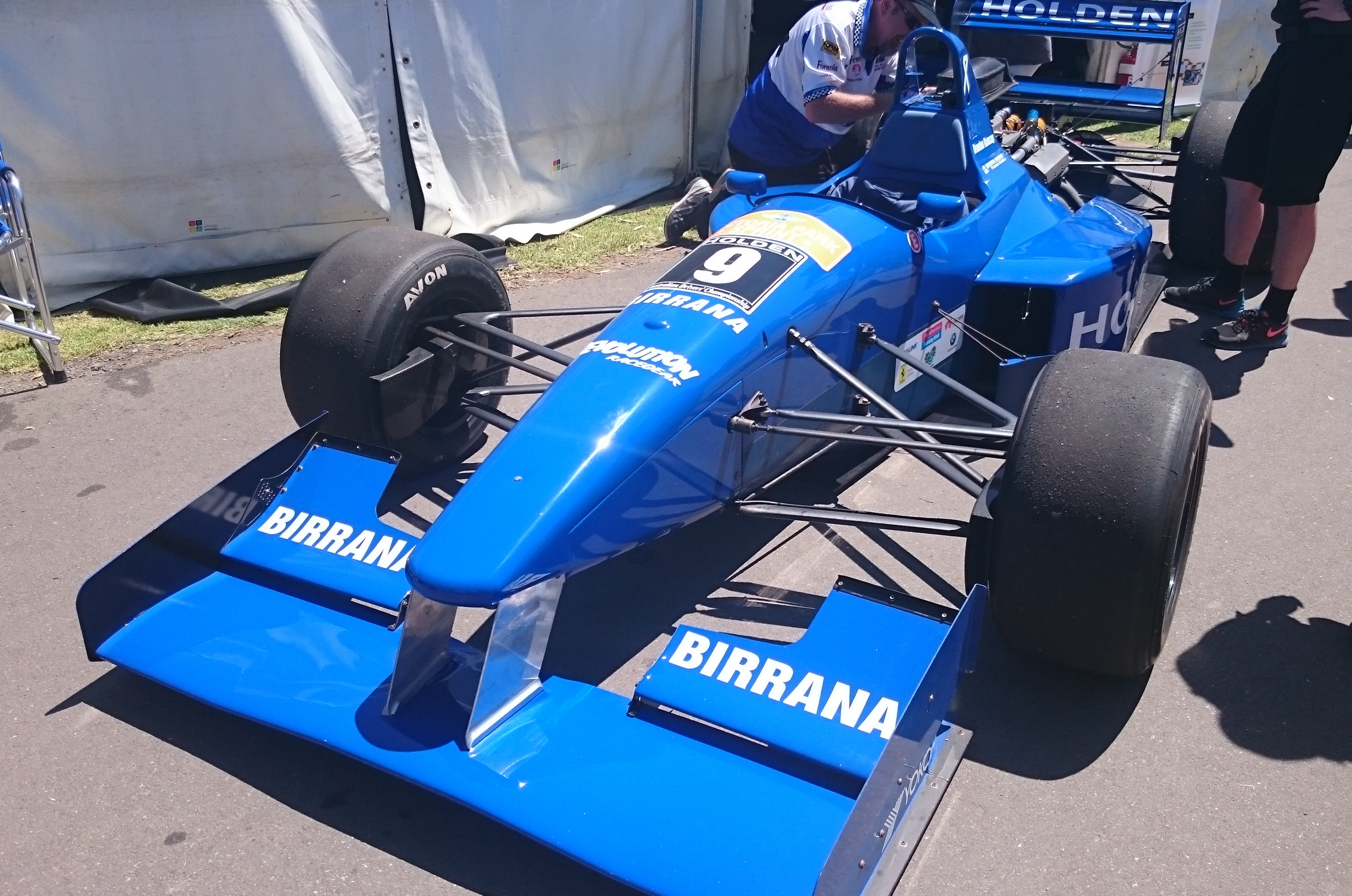
Brenton Ramsay placed 20th driving a Reynard 94D (image from 2015)

Team	Chassis	No	Driver	Rounds
Birrana Racing	Reynard 94D	1	(New Zealand) Simon Wills	All
Birrana Racing	Reynard 94D	8	(New Zealand) LeRoy Stevenson	All
Birrana Racing	Reynard 94D	9	(Australia) Brenton Ramsay	1, 3
D Samimi	Ralt RT21	2	(Australia) Neville Wills	3
Stan Keen	Shrike NB89H	5	(Australia) Stan Keen	8
Kmart Racing	Reynard 93D	7	(Australia) Paul Dumbrell	All
Ralt Australia	Reynard 92D	11	(Australia) Chris Staff	1–5, 7
Ralt Australia	Reynard 94D	12	(New Zealand) Matt Halliday	All
Chas Talbot	March 87B	14	(Australia) Chas Talbot	1
3M Australia Racing Team	Reynard 91D	15	(Australia) Les Crampton	1, 3, 8
Mantis Racing	Reynard 92D	17	(Australia) Mark Ellis	3–6, 8
NRC Racing	Reynard 94D	20	(Australia) Dale Brede	All
NRC Racing	Reynard 95D	25	(Singapore) Christian Murchison	All
Greg Murphy Racing	Reynard 92D	22	(Australia) Tim Leahey	2–7
Camtech Racing	Reynard 91D	24	(Australia) Ian Peters	All
Garry Haywood	Reynard 91D	26	(Australia) Garry Haywood	1–2
Terry Clearihan	Ralt RT23	27	(Australia) Terry Clearihan	4–8
Hocking Motorsport	Reynard 97D	28	(Australia) Roger Oakeshott	All
Hocking Motorsport	Reynard 97D	74	(Australia) Craig Bastian	1–2
Hocking Motorsport	Reynard 98D	74	(Japan) Akihiro Asai	3
Hocking Motorsport	Reynard 97D	74	(Australia) Steve Owen	4–8
Hocking Motorsport	Reynard 94D	75	(New Zealand) Andy Booth	1–5
Hocking Motorsport	Reynard 97D	75	(Australia) Stuart Kostera Jr.	8
Laurentius Consultants	Reynard 94D	36	(Sweden) Lars Johansson	1, 3
Bob Power	Ralt RT23	48	(Australia) Bob Power	2, 4–5
Rohan Carrig	Reynard 89D	49	(Australia) Rohan Carrig	3, 6, 8
Peter Hill	Reynard 94D	66	(Australia) Peter Hill	All
Damien Digby	Reynard 92D	69	(Australia) Damien Digby	3

== Schedule ==
The championship was contested over an eight-round series with two races per round.

Round		Circuit	Date	Pole position	Fastest lap	Winning driver	Winning team
1	R1	(Victoria (state)) Phillip Island Grand Prix Circuit (Phillip Island, Victoria)	13 February	(New Zealand) Simon Wills	(New Zealand) Simon Wills	(New Zealand) Simon Wills	Birrana Racing
1	R2	(Victoria (state)) Phillip Island Grand Prix Circuit (Phillip Island, Victoria)	13 February		(New Zealand) Simon Wills	(New Zealand) Simon Wills	Birrana Racing
2	R1	Eastern Creek International Raceway (Eastern Creek, New South Wales)	26 March	(Australia) Tim Leahey	(Australia) Tim Leahey	(New Zealand) Simon Wills	Birrana Racing
2	R2	Eastern Creek International Raceway (Eastern Creek, New South Wales)	26 March		(Australia) Tim Leahey	(Singapore) Christian Murchison	NRC Racing
3	R1	Adelaide Street Circuit (Adelaide, South Australia)	8–9 April	(New Zealand) Simon Wills	(New Zealand) Simon Wills	(Singapore) Christian Murchison	NRC Racing
3	R2	Adelaide Street Circuit (Adelaide, South Australia)	8–9 April		(New Zealand) Simon Wills	(New Zealand) Matt Halliday	Ralt Australia
4	R1	Canberra Street Circuit (Canberra, Australian Capital Territory)	10–11 June	(Australia) Tim Leahey	(New Zealand) Simon Wills	(New Zealand) Simon Wills	Birrana Racing
4	R2	Canberra Street Circuit (Canberra, Australian Capital Territory)	10–11 June		(New Zealand) Simon Wills	(Australia) Chris Staff	Ralt Australia
5	R1	Queensland Raceway (Ipswich, Queensland)	2 July	(New Zealand) Simon Wills	(New Zealand) Matt Halliday	(New Zealand) Simon Wills	Birrana Racing
5	R2	Queensland Raceway (Ipswich, Queensland)	2 July		(New Zealand) Simon Wills	(Singapore) Christian Murchison	NRC Racing
6	R1	(Victoria (state)) Winton Motor Raceway (Benalla, Victoria)	16 July	(Australia) Tim Leahey	(New Zealand) Simon Wills	(Australia) Tim Leahey	Greg Murphy Racing
6	R2	(Victoria (state)) Winton Motor Raceway (Benalla, Victoria)	16 July		(Singapore) Christian Murchison	(Australia) Tim Leahey	Greg Murphy Racing
7	R1	Oran Park Raceway (Sydney, New South Wales)	30 July	(New Zealand) Simon Wills	(Australia) Tim Leahey	(New Zealand) Simon Wills	Birrana Racing
7	R2	Oran Park Raceway (Sydney, New South Wales)	30 July		(New Zealand) Simon Wills	(New Zealand) Simon Wills	Birrana Racing
8	R1	Mallala Motor Sport Park (Mallala, South Australia)	27 August	(New Zealand) Simon Wills	(New Zealand) Simon Wills	(Singapore) Christian Murchison	NRC Racing
8	R2	Mallala Motor Sport Park (Mallala, South Australia)	27 August		(Singapore) Christian Murchison	(New Zealand) Simon Wills	Birrana Racing

== Points System ==
Championship points were awarded on a 20–15–12–10–8–6–4–3–2–1 basis to the first ten finishers in each race.

== Review ==
New Zealand racer Simon Wills won his second Australian Drivers' Championship driving a Birrana Racing Reynard 94D Holden. Wills won eight of the 16 races to finish 33 points ahead of Singaporean born West Australian Christian Murchison (Reynard 95D & 97D). Another New Zealander, Matt Halliday (Reynard 94D Holden) finished third in the points, 58 points behind Wills. It was the sixth Australian Drivers' Championship victory in seven years for a Birrana Racing driver.

In addition to Wills' eight wins, Murchison took four race victories and Tim Leahey (Reynard 92D Holden) took two with single victories recorded by Halliday and Chris Staff (Reynard 92D Holden)

== Championship results ==
Pos.	Driver	(Victoria (state)) PHI		(New South Wales) EAS		(South Australia) ADE		(Australian Capital Territory) CAN		(Queensland) QUE		(Victoria (state)) WIN		(New South Wales) ORA		(South Australia) MAL		Pts
Pos.	Driver	R1	R2	R1	R2	R1	R2	R1	R2	R1	R2	R1	R2	R1	R2	R1	R2	Pts
1	(New Zealand) Simon Wills	1	1	1	Ret	8	2	1	7	1	2	2	2	1	1	3	1	244
2	(Singapore) Christian Murchison	3	4	2	1	1	5	3	2	2	1	Ret	6	3	2	1	6	208
3	(New Zealand) Matt Halliday	2	2	3	3	2	1	4	Ret	5	Ret	3	3	4	3	2	2	163
4	(Australia) Tim Leahey	DNS	3	Ret	Ret	3	3	2	Ret	Ret	Ret	1	1	2	Ret			109
5	(New Zealand) LeRoy Stevenson	5	12	Ret	4	7	6	7	4	6	3	12	4	8	6	5	5	97
6	(Australia) Paul Dumbrell	4	Ret	5	5	4	4	12	5	7	Ret	4	5	5	4	14	Ret	96
7	(Australia) Dale Brede	7	5	Ret	Ret	12	Ret	5	3	4	12	6	Ret	7	7	4	3	80
8	(Australia) Chris Staff	Ret	DNS	7	2	5	7	6	1	11	4							63
9	(New Zealand) Andy Booth	6	13	4	6	6	8	9	Ret	10	6			6	5			57
10	(Australia) Steve Owen							10	6	3	5	5	Ret	9	8	6	4	56
11	(Australia) Peter Hill	9	7	6	DNS	9	9	8	Ret	13	11	7	7	10	10	9	7	37
12	(Australia) Ian Peters	Ret	8	Ret	8	Ret	14	14	8	9	10	9	8	11	9	7	14	25
13	(Australia) Mark Ellis					10	16	15	9	12	7	10	9			11	9	12
14	(Australia) Garry Haywood	Ret	6	8	Ret													9
15	(Australia) Les Crampton	8	9			11	10									12	15	8
16	(Australia) Roger Oakeshott	Ret	Ret	Ret	Ret	15	11	11	DNS	15	9	8	DNS	Ret	11	Ret	Ret	7
17	(Australia) Terry Clearihan							16	10	14	8	Ret	10	12	12	10	10	6
18	(Australia) Craig Bastian	Ret	11	Ret	7													4
19	(Australia) Stan Keen															8	12	3
=	(Australia) Brenton Ramsay					Ret	Ret											3
=	(Australia) Robert Power			Ret	DNS			13	DNS	8	Ret							3
22	(Sweden) Lars Johansson	10	Ret			Ret	12											2
23	(Australia) Chris Talbot	11	10															1
-	(Australia) Rohan Carrig					16	DNS					11	Ret			13	13	0
-	(Japan) Akihiro Asai					Ret	Ret											0
-	(Australia) Stuart Kostera Jr															Ret	11	0
-	(Australia) Damien Digby					14	13											0
-	(Australia) Neville Wills					13	15											0
Pos.	Driver	(Victoria (state)) PHI		(New South Wales) EAS		(South Australia) ADE		(Australian Capital Territory) CAN		(Queensland) QUE		(Victoria (state)) WIN		(New South Wales) ORA		(South Australia) MAL		Pts
Pos.	Driver	R1	R2	R1	R2	R1	R2	R1	R2	R1	R2	R1	R2	R1	R2	R1	R2	Pts
