= 2000 Konica V8 Lites Series =

Motor racing competition

The 2000 Konica V8 Lites Series was an Australian motor racing competition for V8 Supercars. It was the inaugural standalone series for the second tier of V8 Supercar racing. The series began on 26 March 2000 at the Eastern Creek Raceway and finished on 27 August at Mallala Motor Sport Park and was contested over five rounds across four different states.

The series was won by Dean Canto who placed first in five of the fifteen races of the series and finished 31 points ahead of Matthew White. Wayne Wakefield placed third.

== Vehicle eligibility ==
All cars were required to comply with the Technical Regulations applicable to V8 Supercars as defined within CAMS Group 3A. Eligible models were Ford and Holden vehicles up to, but not including, the Ford AU Falcon and the Holden VT Commodore.

== Teams and drivers ==
The following teams and drivers competed in the 2000 Konica V8 Lites Series.

Team	Car	No.	Driver	Round
Eastern Creek Karts	Ford EL Falcon	20	(Australia) Garry Holt	All
Harris Racing	Ford EL Falcon	30	(Australia) Craig Harris	All
Harris Racing	Ford EL Falcon	88	(Australia) Craig Bastian	4
Gearbox Motorsport	Holden VS Commodore	36	(Australia) Gary Quartly	2
Gearbox Motorsport	Holden VS Commodore; Ford EL Falcon	36	(Australia) Neil Schembri	1, 3–5
Scotty Taylor Racing	Holden VS Commodore	37	(Australia) Bill Attard	1–3
Scotty Taylor Racing	Holden VS Commodore	37	(Australia) Roger Hurd	4–5
South Pacific Motor Racing	Holden VS Commodore	38	(Australia) Peter Field	1–2, 5
South Pacific Motor Racing	Holden VS Commodore	38	(Australia) Shane Howison	3–4
Sieders Racing Team	Ford EL Falcon	42	(Australia) Bill Sieders	All
Sieders Racing Team	Ford EB Falcon; Ford EL Falcon	56	(Australia) John Falk	1–3
Sieders Racing Team	Ford EL Falcon	56	(Australia) Luke Sieders	4–5
Mal Rose Racing	Holden VS Commodore	44	(Australia) Mal Rose	3–4
Dean Canto Racing	Ford EL Falcon	45	(Australia) Dean Canto	All
Daily Planet Racing	Holden VS Commodore	47	(Australia) John Trimbole	2
Trevor Crittenden Motorsport	Holden VS Commodore	57	(Australia) Daniel Natoli	1, 3–4
Trevor Crittenden Motorsport	Holden VS Commodore	57	(Australia) Tim Toth	5
Halliday Motor Sport	Ford EL Falcon	61	(Australia) Ross Halliday	All
Robert Smith Racing	Holden VS Commodore	72	(Australia) Robert Smith	1–3, 5
Terry Wyhoon Racing	Holden VS Commodore	76	(Australia) Matthew White	All
Terry Wyhoon Racing	Holden VS Commodore	125	(Australia) Terry Wyhoon	All
V8 Racing	Holden VS Commodore	77	(Australia) Richard Mork	1, 3–5
V8 Racing	Holden VS Commodore	77	(Australia) Craig Bastian	2
Rowse Motorsport	Holden VP Commodore	81	(Australia) Tim Rowse	All
Miller Racing	Holden VS Commodore	84	(Australia) Daniel Miller	All
The Race Centre	Ford EL Falcon	87	(Australia) Rod Salmon	All
Stone Brothers Racing	Ford EL Falcon	89	(Australia) David Besnard	4–5
Geoff Kendrick	Holden VS Commodore	92	(Australia) Geoff Kendrick	1
John Faulkner Racing	Holden VS Commodore	96	(Australia) Ryan McLeod	All
Graphic Skills Racing	Holden VS Commodore	97	(Australia) Wayne Wakefield	All
Riverlea Motorsport	Holden VS Commodore	127	(Australia) Chris Butler	1–3, 5
Power Racing	Ford EL Falcon	500	(Australia) Alan Heath	5
Peter Hansen	Ford EL Falcon	550	(Australia) Peter Hansen	3

== Race calendar ==
The series was contested over five rounds. Each round comprised three races.

Round	Circuit	Location	Date	Pole position	Fastest lap	Winning driver	Winning team	Round winner
1	(New South Wales) Eastern Creek Raceway	Sydney, New South Wales	25–26 March	(Australia) Ryan McLeod	(Australia) Ryan McLeod	(Australia) Wayne Wakefield	Graphic Skills Racing	(Australia) Dean Canto
1	(New South Wales) Eastern Creek Raceway	Sydney, New South Wales	25–26 March		(Australia) Matthew White	(Australia) Ryan McLeod	John Faulkner Racing	(Australia) Dean Canto
1	(New South Wales) Eastern Creek Raceway	Sydney, New South Wales	25–26 March		(Australia) Ryan McLeod	(Australia) Dean Canto	Dean Canto Racing	(Australia) Dean Canto
2	(Victoria (state)) Phillip Island Grand Prix Circuit	Phillip Island, Victoria	6–7 May	(Australia) Ryan McLeod	(Australia) Ryan McLeod	(Australia) Wayne Wakefield	Graphic Skills Racing	(Australia) Ryan McLeod
2	(Victoria (state)) Phillip Island Grand Prix Circuit	Phillip Island, Victoria	6–7 May		(Australia) Matthew White	(Australia) Wayne Wakefield	Graphic Skills Racing	(Australia) Ryan McLeod
2	(Victoria (state)) Phillip Island Grand Prix Circuit	Phillip Island, Victoria	6–7 May		(Australia) Ryan McLeod	(Australia) Ryan McLeod	John Faulkner Racing	(Australia) Ryan McLeod
3	(New South Wales) Oran Park Raceway	Sydney, New South Wales	17–18 June	(Australia) Craig Harris	(Australia) Dean Canto	(Australia) Dean Canto	Dean Canto Racing	(Australia) Dean Canto
3	(New South Wales) Oran Park Raceway	Sydney, New South Wales	17–18 June		(Australia) Matthew White	(Australia) Matthew White	Terry Wyhoon Racing	(Australia) Dean Canto
3	(New South Wales) Oran Park Raceway	Sydney, New South Wales	17–18 June		(Australia) Dean Canto	(Australia) Dean Canto	Dean Canto Racing	(Australia) Dean Canto
4	(Queensland) Lakeside International Raceway	Brisbane, Queensland	5–6 August	(Australia) David Besnard	(Australia) David Besnard	(Australia) David Besnard	Stone Brothers Racing	(Australia) David Besnard
4	(Queensland) Lakeside International Raceway	Brisbane, Queensland	5–6 August		(Australia) David Besnard	(Australia) Dean Canto	Dean Canto Racing	(Australia) David Besnard
4	(Queensland) Lakeside International Raceway	Brisbane, Queensland	5–6 August		(Australia) David Besnard	(Australia) David Besnard	Stone Brothers Racing	(Australia) David Besnard
5	(South Australia) Mallala Motor Sport Park	Mallala, South Australia	26–27 August	(Australia) David Besnard	(Australia) David Besnard	(Australia) David Besnard	Stone Brothers Racing	(Australia) David Besnard
5	(South Australia) Mallala Motor Sport Park	Mallala, South Australia	26–27 August		(Australia) David Besnard	(Australia) Dean Canto	Dean Canto Racing	(Australia) David Besnard
5	(South Australia) Mallala Motor Sport Park	Mallala, South Australia	26–27 August		(Australia) David Besnard	(Australia) David Besnard	Stone Brothers Racing	(Australia) David Besnard

== Points system ==
Points were awarded for the top ten positions in each race on the following basis:

Position	1st	2nd	3rd	4th	5th	6th	7th	8th	9th	10th
Points	20	16	14	12	10	8	6	4	2	1

== Series standings ==
Pos.	Driver	No.	EAS (New South Wales)			PHI (Victoria (state))			ORA (New South Wales)			LAK (Queensland)			MAL (South Australia)			Points
1	(Australia) Dean Canto	45	3	2	1	5	4	2	1	3	1	3	1	10	2	1	2	229
2	(Australia) Matthew White	76	2	3	3	3	3	3	5	1	Ret	5	4	2	3	2	3	198
3	(Australia) Wayne Wakefield	97	1	Ret	Ret	1	1	5	3	Ret	8	2	2	4	5	5	4	164
4	(Australia) Ryan McLeod	96	4	1	2	2	2	1	7	6	Ret	4	Ret	5	4	10	6	157
5	(Australia) David Besnard	89										1	3	1	1	3	1	108
6	(Australia) Craig Harris	30	Ret	DNS	DNS	4	DNS	4	2	4	10	Ret	8	Ret	6	4	5	87
7	(Australia) Daniel Miller	84	7	9	8	7	7	13	6	Ret	3	8	6	6	Ret	DNS	7	72
8	(Australia) Garry Holt	20	5	5	4	Ret	DNS	DNS	8	5	7	7	7	8	Ret	9	12	70
9	(Australia) Mal Rose	44							4	2	Ret	9	5	3				54
10	(Australia) Neil Schembri	36	6	4	5				11	9	5	10	12	DNS	Ret	DNS	DNS	43
11	(Australia) Terry Wyhoon	125	8	7	9	12	Ret	6	10	11	6	DNS	9	7	7	11	DNS	43
12	(Australia) Richard Mork	77	12	8	6				17	8	2	Ret	10	Ret	12	13	16	33
13	(Australia) Rod Salmon	87	Ret	DNS	DNS	8	5	Ret	9	13	11	6	16	9	13	Ret	13	26
14	(Australia) Chris Butler	127	Ret	DNS	DNS	6	Ret	Ret	13	Ret	4				Ret	Ret	8	24
15	(Australia) Geoff Kendrick	92	9	6	7													16
16	(Australia) Alan Heath	500													9	6	10	11
17	(Australia) Craig Bastian	77/88				9	6	Ret				11	Ret	11				10
18	(Australia) Tim Rowse	81	11	10	DNS	10	11	11	Ret	7	9	Ret	DNS	DNS	Ret	DNS	DNS	10
19	(Australia) Peter Field	38	13	DNS	13	15	DNS	10							11	7	11	7
20	(Australia) Ross Halliday	61	15	11	12	13	10	7	16	Ret	Ret	12	15	12	15	12	Ret	7
21	(Australia) Bill Attard	37	Ret	DNS	DNS	14	9	8	15	12	12							6
22	(Australia) Roger Hurd	37										14	14	14	14	8	9	6
23	(Australia) Luke Sieders	56										11	Ret	11	8	DNS	DNS	4
24	(Australia) Robert Smith	72	14	12	11	11	8	12	DNS	Ret	Ret				16	Ret	14	4
25	(Australia) Bill Sieders	42	10	Ret	10	Ret	Ret	Ret	18	Ret	Ret	Ret	13	Ret	10	DNS	15	3
26	(Australia) John Falk	56	16	13	14	Ret	Ret	9	14	Ret	DNS							2
27	(Australia) Shane Howison	38							12	10	Ret	Ret	DNS	DNS				1
Pos.	Driver	No.	EAS (New South Wales)			PHI (Victoria (state))			ORA (New South Wales)			LAK (Queensland)			MAL (South Australia)			Points

Colour	Result
Gold	Winner
Silver	Second place
Bronze	Third place
Green	Points classification
Blue	Non-points classification
Blue	Non-classified finish (NC)
Purple	Retired, not classified (Ret)
Red	Did not qualify (DNQ)
Red	Did not pre-qualify (DNPQ)
Black	Disqualified (DSQ)
White	Did not start (DNS)
White	Withdrew (WD)
White	Race cancelled (C)
Blank	Did not practice (DNP)
Blank	Did not arrive (DNA)
Blank	Excluded (EX)

== See also ==
- 2000 Australian Touring Car season
