= Simon Wills =

New Zealand racing driver (born 1976)

- Nationality: (New Zealand) New Zealander
- Born: Simon Peter Wills; 3 October 1976 (age 50) Auckland, New Zealand

Retired career
- Debut season: 1993

Championship titles
- 1996 1998, 1999 1999, 2000 2001: British F3 – Class B New Zealand Grand Prix; Australian Drivers' Championship; Konica V8 Supercar Series

Awards
- 1996–2002: Jim Clark Trophy, Bruce McLaren Trophy, Owen Steel Trophy, NZGP 1998 & 1999, 2x NZ Gold Stars, 2x Australian Gold Stars

Simon Peter Wills (born 3 October 1976 in Auckland, New Zealand) is a former racing driver who currently runs a graphic design business.

== Racing career ==
=== Formula cars ===
Wills finished runner up in the 1995 New Zealand Formula Ford Championship. He had gained a large lead in the series, but left the championship two races early to attempt to launch a career in Europe. He won Class B of the British Formula 3 Championship in 1996. However, he didn't have the finances to continue his career in Europe and decided to focus on racing in Australia and New Zealand.

Wills won the 1998 and 1999 New Zealand Grands Prix. He was the Australian Drivers' Champion (Formula Holden) in both 1999 and 2000, and New Zealand Gold Star Champion for 1998 and 1999, including winning the 1999 Tasman Cup. He also holds, or has held, the outright lap record at several tracks, including the Phillip Island Grand Prix Circuit, Hidden Valley Raceway, Pukekohe Park Raceway, Manfeild Autocourse, Canberra Street Circuit and Queensland Raceway, which were all set in a Reynard 94D.

=== Touring cars ===
Wills won the Konica V8 Supercar Series in 2001. In the main V8 Supercar series, he also competed in nine Bathurst 1000s, debuting with Gibson Motorsport in 1998, and finishing in 2007 with Brad Jones Racing. Wills also held the lap record of the Mount Panorama Circuit in Bathurst between the 2001 and 2002 races, having set the lap record during the 2001 Bathurst 1000. Following Bathurst in 2001, Wills completed the remaining rounds in the 2001 season with Briggs Motor Sport, and then drove full-time from 2003 to 2005 with Team Dynamik. In 2007, he drove the bulk of the rounds with Brad Jones Racing after team owner and lead driver Brad Jones retired mid-season.

Wills' most significant achievement in V8 Supercar was winning the 2002 Queensland 500 endurance race for Stone Brothers Racing, co-driving with David Besnard. Wills went close to going back to back at the Bathurst lead-up event, with co-driver Jason Richards going off late in the 2003 Betta Electrical Sandown 500 while attempting to overtake Mark Skaife for the lead. Wills was also the driver when Team Dynamik infamously ran a test session on an airfield near Woomera, South Australia in 2004, which resulted in significant penalties for the team.

== Career results ==
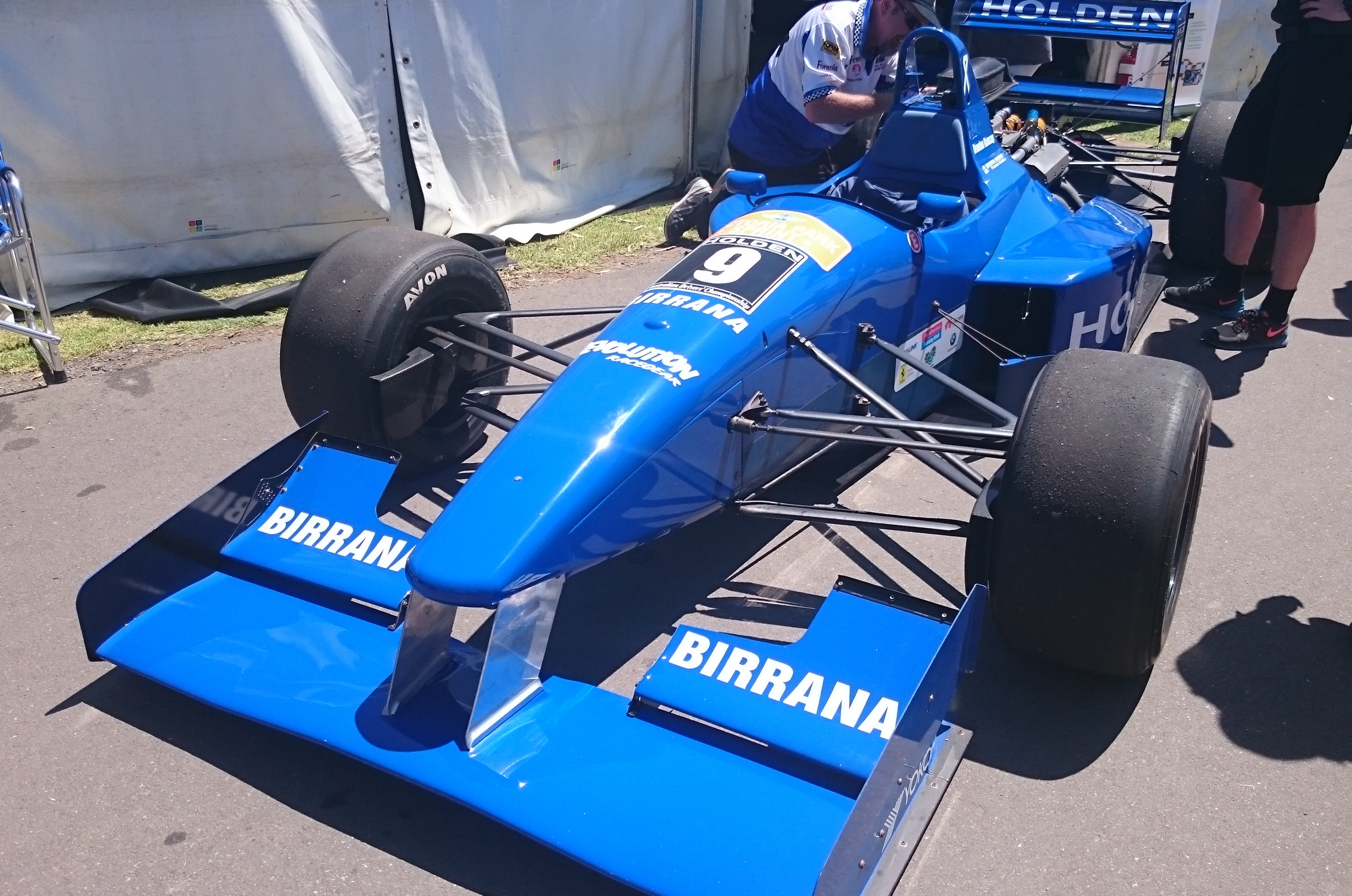
Wills won the 1999 and 2000 Australian Drivers' Championships in a Reynard 94D, similar to the example pictured above

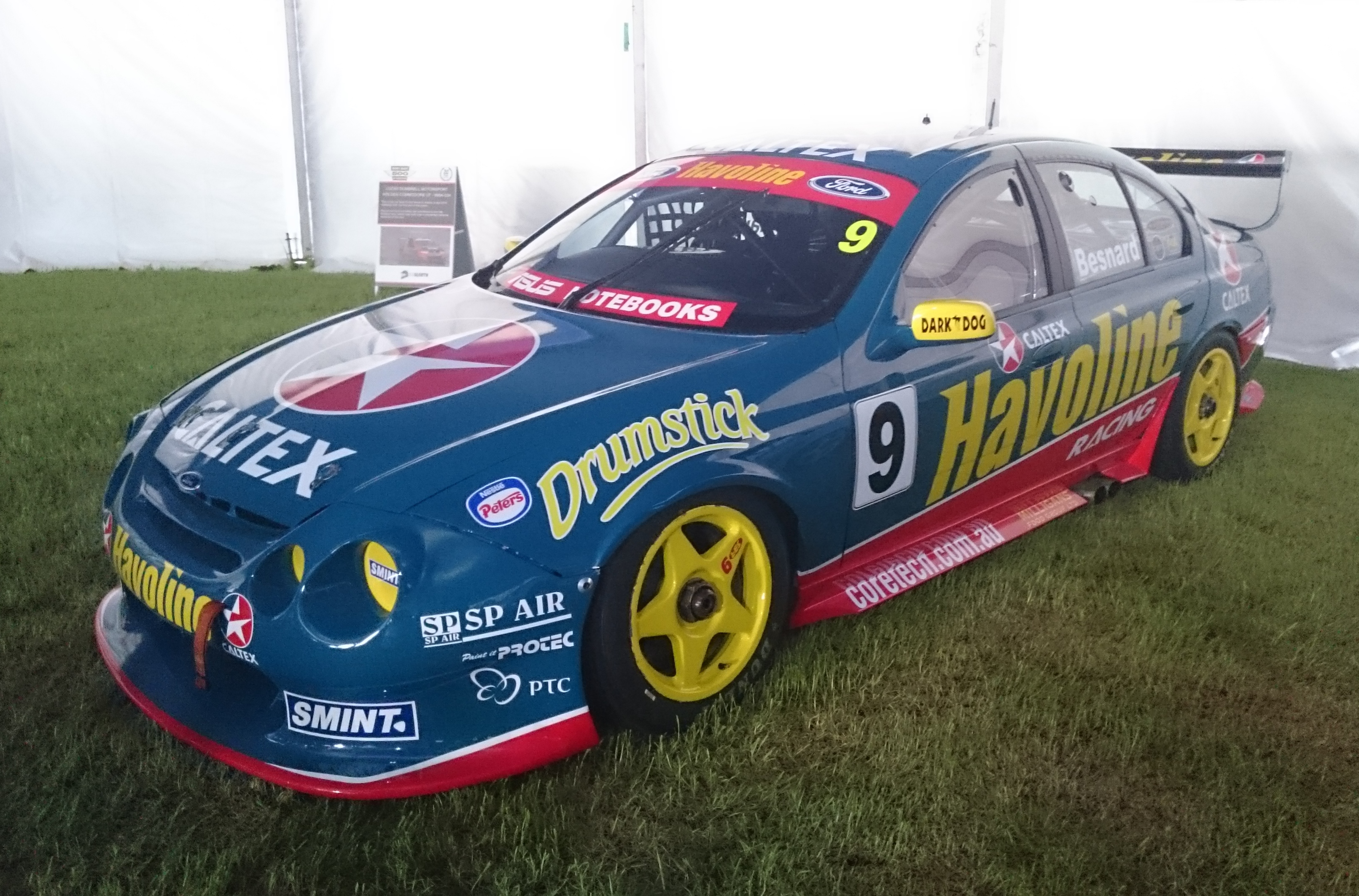
Wills and David Besnard won the 2002 VIP Petfoods Queensland 500 driving a Ford Falcon AU. The car is pictured in 2018.

Season	Series	Team	Races	Wins	Poles	F/laps	Podiums	Points	Position
1995	European Formula Ford Championship		?	?	?	?	?	19	8th
1995	British Formula Ford Championship		?	?	?	?	?	59	7th
1996	British Formula Three Championship - Class B	Z-Speed Racing	16	3	?	?	?	201	**1st**
1996-97	New Zealand Touring Car Championship	TSW Alloy Wheels	12	2	1	2	3	216	7th
1997	British Formula Three Championship	Intersport Racing	14	0	0	0	0	22	13th
1998	Australian Drivers' Championship	Greg Murphy Racing	3	1	?	?	1	23	8th
1999	Australian Drivers' Championship	Birrana Racing	13	11	?	?	12	235	**1st**
1999	Tasman Cup	Birrana Racing	?	?	?	?	?	?	**1st**
1999	Shell Championship Series	John Faulkner Racing	2	0	0	0	0	192	42nd
2000	Australian Drivers' Championship	Birrana Racing	16	8	?	?	13	239	**1st**
2000	Shell Championship Series	Stone Brothers Racing	2	0	0	0	0	236	25th
2001	Australian Drivers' Championship	Birrana Racing	4	3	?	?	3	60	9th
2001	Konica V8 Supercar Series	Team Dynamik	17	10	2	3	10	1272	**1st**
2001	Shell Championship Series	Briggs Motor Sport	2	0	0	1	0	416	41st
2002	V8 Supercar Championship Series	Briggs Motor Sport	22	1	0	0	1	496	20th
2003	V8 Supercar Championship Series	Team Dynamik	22	0	0	0	0	1059	22nd
2004	V8 Supercar Championship Series	Team Dynamik	23	0	0	1	0	929	26th
2005	V8 Supercar Championship Series	Team Dynamik	23	0	0	0	0	437	34th
2007	Fujitsu V8 Supercar Series	Team Dynamik	2	0	0	0	0	0	-
2007	V8 Supercar Championship Series	Brad Jones Racing	29	0	0	0	0	12	45th
2008	Commodore Cup National Series		2	0	0	0	0	102	32nd
2008	V8 Ute Racing Series	Nandi Kiss Racing	3	0	0	0	0	82	36th
2008	Fujitsu V8 Supercar Series	Eggleston Motorsport	2	0	0	0	0	63	44th

=== Complete V8 Supercars results ===
(Races in bold indicate pole position) (Races in italics indicate fastest lap)

Supercars results
Year	Team	Car	1	2	3	4	5	6	7	8	9	10	11	12	13	14	15	16	17	18	19	20	21	22	23	24	25	26	27	28	29	30	31	32	33	34	35	36	37	Position	Points
1999	John Faulkner Racing	Holden Commodore (VT)	EAS; R1	EAS; R2	EAS; R3	ADE; R4	BAR; R5	BAR; R6	BAR; R7	PHI; R8	PHI; R9	PHI; R10	HDV; R11	HDV; R12	HDV; R13	SAN; R14	SAN; R15	SAN; R16	QLD; R17	QLD; R18	QLD; R19	CAL; R20	CAL; R21	CAL; R22	SYM; R23	SYM; R24	SYM; R25	WIN; R26	WIN; R27	WIN; R28	ORA; R29	ORA; R30	ORA; R31	QLD; R32; 9	BAT; R33; Ret					42nd	192
2000	Stone Brothers Racing	Ford Falcon (AU)	PHI; R1	PHI; R2	BAR; R3	BAR; R4	BAR; R5	ADE; R6	ADE; R7	EAS; R8	EAS; R9	EAS; R10	HDV; R11	HDV; R12	HDV; R13	CAN; R14	CAN; R15	CAN; R16	QLD; R17	QLD; R18	QLD; R19	WIN; R20	WIN; R21	WIN; R22	ORA; R23	ORA; R24	ORA; R25	CAL; R26	CAL; R27	CAL; R28	QLD; R29; 10	SAN; R30	SAN; R31	SAN; R32	BAT; R33; 7					25th	236
2001	Briggs Motorsport	Ford Falcon (AU)	PHI; R1	PHI; R2	ADE; R3	ADE; R4	EAS; R5	EAS; R6	HDV; R7	HDV; R8	HDV; R9	CAN; R10	CAN; R11	CAN; R12	BAR; R13	BAR; R14	BAR; R15	CAL; R16	CAL; R17	CAL; R18	ORA; R19	ORA; R20	QLD; R21; Ret	WIN; R22	WIN; R23	BAT; R24; Ret	PUK; R25; 11	PUK; R26; 21	PUK; R27; Ret	SAN; R28; 18	SAN; R29; 15	SAN; R30; 9								41st	416
2002	Briggs Motorsport	Ford Falcon (AU)	ADE; R1; Ret	ADE; R2; 16	PHI; R3; 13	PHI; R4; 16	EAS; R5; Ret	EAS; R6; 19	EAS; R7; 21	HDV; R8; 28	HDV; R9; 17	HDV; R10; 26	CAN; R11; 19	CAN; R12; Ret	CAN; R13; 23	BAR; R14; 15	BAR; R15; 22	BAR; R16; 22	ORA; R17; 15	ORA; R18; 17	WIN; R19	WIN; R20	QLD; R21	BAT; R22	SUR; R23	SUR; R24	PUK; R25	PUK; R26	PUK; R27	SAN; R28	SAN; R29									20th	496
2002	Stone Brothers Racing	Ford Falcon (AU)	ADE; R1	ADE; R2	PHI; R3	PHI; R4	EAS; R5	EAS; R6	EAS; R7	HDV; R8	HDV; R9	HDV; R10	CAN; R11	CAN; R12	CAN; R13	BAR; R14	BAR; R15	BAR; R16	ORA; R17	ORA; R18	WIN; R19	WIN; R20	QLD; R21; 1	BAT; R22	SUR; R23	SUR; R24	PUK; R25	PUK; R26	PUK; R27	SAN; R28	SAN; R29									20th	496
2002	Team Kiwi Racing	Holden Commodore (VT)	ADE; R1	ADE; R2	PHI; R3	PHI; R4	EAS; R5	EAS; R6	EAS; R7	HDV; R8	HDV; R9	HDV; R10	CAN; R11	CAN; R12	CAN; R13	BAR; R14	BAR; R15	BAR; R16	ORA; R17	ORA; R18	WIN; R19	WIN; R20	QLD; R21	BAT; R22; 11	SUR; R23	SUR; R24	PUK; R25	PUK; R26	PUK; R27	SAN; R28	SAN; R29									20th	496
2002	Imrie Motorsport	Holden Commodore (VX)	ADE; R1	ADE; R2	PHI; R3	PHI; R4	EAS; R5	EAS; R6	EAS; R7	HDV; R8	HDV; R9	HDV; R10	CAN; R11	CAN; R12	CAN; R13	BAR; R14	BAR; R15	BAR; R16	ORA; R17	ORA; R18	WIN; R19	WIN; R20	QLD; R21	BAT; R22	SUR; R23	SUR; R24	PUK; R25	PUK; R26	PUK; R27	SAN; R28; 28	SAN; R29; Ret									20th	496
2003	Team Dynamik	Holden Commodore (VY)	ADE; R1; 16	ADE; R1; 9	PHI; R3; 22	EAS; R4; 7	WIN; R5; Ret	BAR; R6; 8	BAR; R7; Ret	BAR; R8; 16	HDV; R9; 11	HDV; R10; 9	HDV; R11; 6	QLD; R12; Ret	ORA; R13; Ret	SAN; R14; Ret	BAT; R15; 22	SUR; R16; 22	SUR; R17; 11	PUK; R18; 13	PUK; R19; 8	PUK; R20; 7	EAS; R21; Ret	EAS; R22; 22																22nd	1059
2004	Team Dynamik	Holden Commodore (VY)	ADE; R1; Ret	ADE; R2; Ret	EAS; R3; 16	PUK; R4; 15	PUK; R5; 12	PUK; R6; 15	HDV; R7; 30	HDV; R8; 25	HDV; R9; 12	BAR; R10; Ret	BAR; R11; Ret	BAR; R12; 21	QLD; R13; Ret	WIN; R14; 23	ORA; R15; 15	ORA; R16; 6	SAN; R17; Ret	BAT; R18; 13	SUR; R19; 6	SUR; R20; 4	SYM; R21; Ret	SYM; R22; 16	SYM; R23; 12	EAS; R24; 26	EAS; R25; Ret	EAS; R26; 19												26th	929
2005	Team Dynamik	Holden Commodore (VZ)	ADE; R1; Ret	ADE; R2; 19	PUK; R3; 30	PUK; R4; 17	PUK; R5; Ret	BAR; R6; 18	BAR; R7; 28	BAR; R8; 18	EAS; R9; 34	EAS; R10; 20	SHA; R11; 18	SHA; R12; 13	SHA; R13; 20	HDV; R14; Ret	HDV; R15; 21	HDV; R16; Ret	QLD; R17; 23	ORA; R18; Ret	ORA; R19; 17	SAN; R20; DNS	BAT; R21	SUR; R22	SUR; R23	SUR; R24	SYM; R25	SYM; R26	SYM; R27	PHI; R28; Ret	PHI; R29; 26	PHI; R30; 23								34th	437
2007	Brad Jones Racing	Ford Falcon (BF)	ADE; R1	ADE; R2	BAR; R3	BAR; R4	BAR; R5	PUK; R6	PUK; R7	PUK; R8	WIN; R9; 16	WIN; R10; Ret	WIN; R11; 23	EAS; R12; 21	EAS; R13; 18	EAS; R14; 19	HDV; R15; 17	HDV; R16; 20	HDV; R17; 22	QLD; R18; 21	QLD; R19; 21	QLD; R20; Ret	ORA; R21; 24	ORA; R22; 10	ORA; R23; 17	SAN; R24; Ret	BAT; R25; Ret	SUR; R26; Ret	SUR; R27; 20	SUR; R28; 15	BHR; R29; 21	BHR; R30; 15	BHR; R31; 23	SYM; R32; 22	SYM; R33; 24	SYM; R34; Ret	PHI; R35; 26	PHI; R36; Ret	PHI; R37; Ret	46th	12

=== Bathurst 1000 results ===
Year	Team	Car	Co-driver	Position	Laps
1998	Gibson Motorsport	Holden Commodore (VS)	(Australia) David Parsons	DNF	57
1999	John Faulkner Racing	Holden Commodore (VT)	(New Zealand) John Faulkner	DNF	65
2000	Stone Brothers Racing	Ford Falcon (AU)	(New Zealand) Craig Baird	7th	161
2001	Briggs Motor Sport	Ford Falcon (AU)	(Australia) John Bowe	DNF	124
2002	Team Kiwi Racing	Holden Commodore (VX)	(New Zealand) Jason Richards	11th	160
2003	Team Dynamik	Holden Commodore (VY)	(New Zealand) Jason Richards	22nd	139
2004	Team Dynamik	Holden Commodore (VY)	(Australia) Paul Stokell	13th	159
2007	Brad Jones Racing	Ford Falcon (BF)	(Australia) Andrew Jones	DNF	52

== Business ==
In the latter years of his racing career, Wills launched a graphic design and signwriting business in Adelaide, South Australia. Formed with his wife, Sinch Creative focuses on motor racing designs amongst other areas.

Sporting positions
Preceded by Brady Kennett	Winner of the New Zealand Grand Prix; 1998 and 1999	Succeeded by Andy Booth
Preceded by Scott Dixon	Winner of the Australian Drivers' Championship; 1999 and 2000	Succeeded by Rick Kelly
Preceded by Dean Canto	Winner of the Konica V8 Supercar Series; 2001	Succeeded by Paul Dumbrell
