= 1999 Australian Drivers' Championship =

Motor racing competition

Seasons
- ← 1998 2000 →

The 1999 Australian Drivers' Championship was a CAMS sanctioned motor racing title open to drivers of Formula Holden racing cars. The winner of the championship, which was the 43rd Australian Drivers' Championship, was awarded the 1999 CAMS Gold Star. Due to a sponsorship arrangement with Holden, the championship was promoted as the "Holden Australian Drivers' Championship".

The championship was won by Simon Wills driving a Reynard 94D for Birrana Racing Pty Ltd.

== Teams and drivers ==
Team	Chassis	No	Driver	Rounds
Stan Keen	Shrike NB89H	5	(Australia) Stan Keen	2
Badia Court Pty Ltd	Reynard 94D	7	(Australia) Paul Dumbrell	All
Birrana Racing	Reynard 94D	8	(New Zealand) Simon Wills	All
Birrana Racing	Reynard 94D	9	(Australia) Brenton Ramsay	All
Ralt Australia	Reynard 91D	10	(New Zealand) Kevin Bell	1–2, 4
Ralt Australia	Reynard 92D	11	(Australia) Chris Staff	All
Ralt Australia	Reynard 91D	12	(New Zealand) Matt Halliday	All
Chas Talbot	March 87B	14	(Australia) Chas Talbot	4, 6
PIAA Australia Racing Team	Reynard 91D	15	(Australia) Les Crampton	All
Astuti Motorsport	Reynard 94D	16	(Australia) Sam Astuti	1–4
Mantis Racing Cars	Ralt RT23	17	(Australia) Mark Ellis	All
Plumbtec Racing	Reynard 94D	18	(New Zealand) Steven Kelly	2, 4, 6
NRC International	Reynard 95D	19	(Australia) Arthur Abrahams	1
NRC International	Reynard 95D	20	(Japan) Akihiro Asai	All
NRC International	Reynard 92D	25	(Australia) Adam Macrow	1–5
NRC International	Reynard 95D	25	(New Zealand) Jason Liefting	6–7
Greg Murphy Racing	Reynard 92D	22	(Australia) Ray Stubber	1
Greg Murphy Racing	Reynard 92D	22	(Australia) Todd Kelly	3
Greg Murphy Racing	Reynard 91D	66	(Australia) Peter Hill	4–6
Craig Bastian	Reynard 92D	23	(Australia) Craig Bastian	3, 7
Ian Peters	Reynard 91D	24	(Australia) Ian Peters	2–7
Gary Haywood	Reynard 90D	26	(Australia) Garry Haywood	2, 4, 6
National Capital Motors	Reynard 94D	27	(Australia) Dale Brede	1–5, 7
Barshott Racing	Lola T93/50	28	(Australia) Roger Oakeshott	All
Lars Johansson	Reynard 94D	36	(Sweden) Lars Johansson	5–7
SH Racing	Reynard 92D	47	(Australia) Tim Leahey	4–7
TAS Racing	Ralt RT23	48	(Australia) Robert Power	6
Digby Motorsport	Reynard 92D	69	(Australia) Damien Digby	All
Hocking Motorsport	Reynard 94D	74	(Australia) John de Vries	1
Hocking Motorsport	Reynard 94D	74	(Australia) Chris Hocking	2–4
Digby Motorsport	Reynard 92D	87	(Australia) Chas Jacobsen	3–4

== Schedule ==
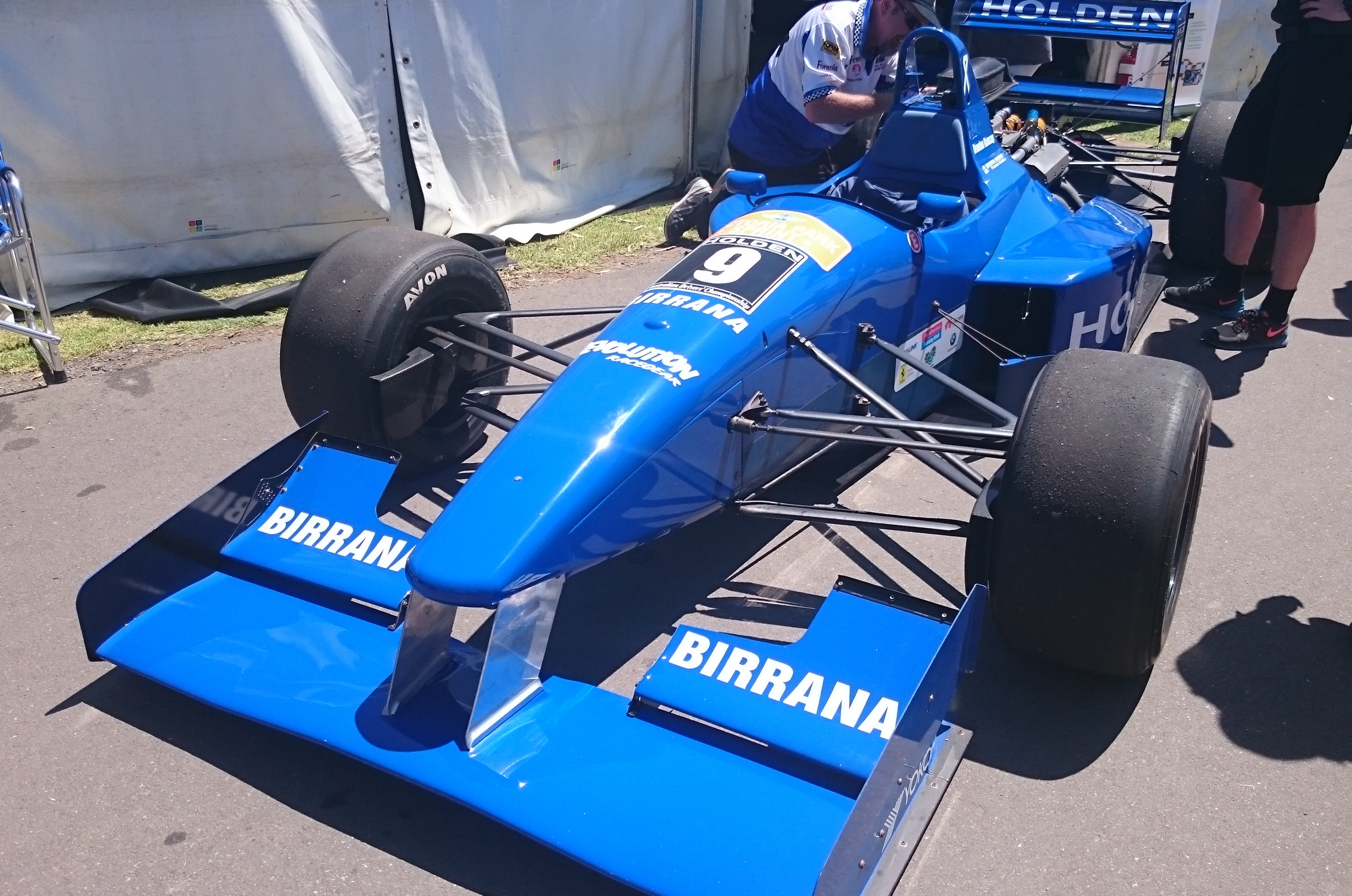
Brenton Ramsay placed 7th driving a Reynard 94D (image from 2015)

The championship was contested over a seven-round series, with two races per round.

Round	Circuit	State	Date
1	Eastern Creek Raceway	New South Wales	27 & 28 March
2	Adelaide Parklands Circuit	South Australia	10 & 11 April
3	Phillip Island Grand Prix Circuit	Victoria	15 & 16 May
4	Sandown International Motor Raceway	Victoria	27 June
5	Queensland Raceway	Queensland	10 & 11 July
6	Winton Motor Raceway	Victoria	21 & 22 August
7	Oran Park Raceway	New South Wales	4 & 5 September

== Points system ==
Championship points were awarded on a 20–15–12–10–8–6–4–3–2–1 basis to the top ten finishers in each race.

== Championship results ==
Pos.	Driver	No	Car %	Entrant	Eastern Ck		Adelaide		Phillip Is		Sandown		Queenld Rwy		Winton Rwy		Oran Pk Rwy		Total
Pos.	Driver	No	Car %	Entrant	R1	R2	R1	R2	R1	R2	R1	R2	R1	R2	R1+	R2	R1	R2	Total
1	Simon Wills	8	Reynard 94D	Birrana Racing Pty Ltd	20	20	20	20	15	0	20	20	20	20		20	20	20	235
2	Chris Staff	11	Reynard 92D	Ralt Australia	15	15	Ret	8	12	4	3	12	12	15		Ret	15	15	126
3	Matt Halliday	12	Reynard 91D; Reynard 94D	Ralt Australia	10	4	12	15	4	1	12	15	DNS	10		Ret	12	12	107
4	Adam Macrow	25	Reynard 91D; Reynard 95D	Arthur Abrahams	12	12	15	12	10	3	6	DNS	Ret	0					70
5	Akihiro Asai	20	Reynard 95D	Arthur Abrahams	3	10	Ret	10	6	Ret	0	8	Ret	Ret		12	10	10	69
6	Paul Dumbrell	7	Reynard 94D	Badia Court Pty Ltd	4	Ret	8	6	DNS	DNS	8	10	10	8		0	6	Ret	60
7	Brenton Ramsay	9	Reynard 94D	Birrana Racing Pty Ltd	Ret	Ret	Ret	Ret	8	0	15	DNS	15	12		Ret	Ret	4	54
8	Todd Kelly	22	Reynard 92D	Greg Murphy					20	20									40
9	Les Crampton	15	Reynard 91D	FIAA Australia Racing Team	0	1	2	3	3	6	2	4	0	3		4	4	2	34
10	Tim Leahey	47	Reynard 92D	SH Racing							10	DNS	Ret	Ret		15	Ret	8	33
11	Dale Brede	27	Reynard 94D	National Capital Motors	2	Ret	Ret	Ret	DNS	12	0	3	8	4			Ret	DNS	29
12	Damien Digby	69	Reynard 92D	Damien Digby	0	0	4	4	0	2	1	2	2	Ret		10	3	Ret	28
13	Sam Astuti	16	Reynard 94D	Tony Astuti	1	0	10	Ret	1	15	Ret	DNS							27
14	Kevin Bell	10	Reynard 91D	Ralt Australia	6	8	DNS	DNS			0	6							20
15	Peter Hill	66	Reynard 91D	Greg Murphy							Ret	DNS	6	6		6			18
16	Arthur Abrahams	19	Reynard 95D	Arthur Abrahams	8	6													14
17	Roger Oakeshott	28	Lola T93-50	Roger Oakeshott	0	2	3	1	2	0	0	DNS	1	0		2	Ret	3	14
18	Jason Liefting	25	Reynard 95D	Arthur Abrahams												Ret	8	6	14
19	Chas Jacobsen	87	Reynard 92D	Chas Jacobsen					0	10	0	0							10
20	Craig Bastian	23	Reynard 92D	Craig Bastian					0	8							Ret	Ret	8
21	Bob Power	48	Ralt RT23	TAS Racing												8			8
22	Ian Peters	24	Reynard 91D	Ian Peters			0	Ret	0	0	0	1	4	2		Ret	1	0	8
23	Stan Keen	5	Shrike NB89H	Stan Keen			6	Ret											6
24	Garry Haywood	26	Reynard 90D	Garry Haywood			Ret	2			4	DNS				0			6
25	Lars Johansson	36	Reynard 94D	Lars Johansson									0	Ret		3	2	1	6
26	Mark Ellis	17	Reynard 94D	Mark Ellis	0	0	0	0	0	0	DNS	DNS	3	1		1	Ret	Ret	5
27	Ray Stubber	22	Reynard 92D	Greg Murphy	Ret	3													3
28	Martyn Porter	74	Reynard 94D	Chris Hocking			1	Ret											1
	John de Vries	74	Reynard 94D	Chris Hocking	Ret	DNS													
	Steve Kelly	18	Reynard 94D	NPS / Plumbtec Racing			Ret	Ret			Ret	0				0			
	Chris Hocking	74	Reynard 94D	Chris Hocking					0	Ret	0	0							
	Chas Talbot	14	March 87B	Chas Talbot							0	0				0			

Colour	Result
Gold	Winner
Silver	Second place
Bronze	Third place
Green	Points classification
Blue	Non-points classification
Blue	Non-classified finish (NC)
Purple	Retired, not classified (Ret)
Red	Did not qualify (DNQ)
Red	Did not pre-qualify (DNPQ)
Black	Disqualified (DSQ)
White	Did not start (DNS)
White	Withdrew (WD)
White	Race cancelled (C)
Blank	Did not practice (DNP)
Blank	Did not arrive (DNA)
Blank	Excluded (EX)

Note:

% Contemporary Formula Holden regulations mandated the use of a 3.8 litre Holden V6 engine.

+ No points were awarded for the first race of Round 6 as the race was cancelled due to a series of accidents.
