= 2002 Queensland 500 =

2002 Supercar Championship event

2002 VIP Petfoods Queensland 500
Event Information
- Round 9 of 13 in the 2002 V8 Supercar Championship Series
- Date: 13–15 September 2002
- Location: Ipswich, Queensland
- Venue: Queensland Raceway
- Weather: Mixed

Results
Race 1
Distance	161 laps	500 km
Pole position	Marcos Ambrose; Stone Brothers Racing	1:10.8726
Winner	David Besnard; Simon Wills; Stone Brothers Racing	3:38:04.2825
Round Results
First	David Besnard Simon Wills; Stone Brothers Racing	400 pts
Second	Steven Richards Russell Ingall; Perkins Engineering	320 pts
Third	Garth Tander Jason Bargwanna; Garry Rogers Motorsport	256 pts

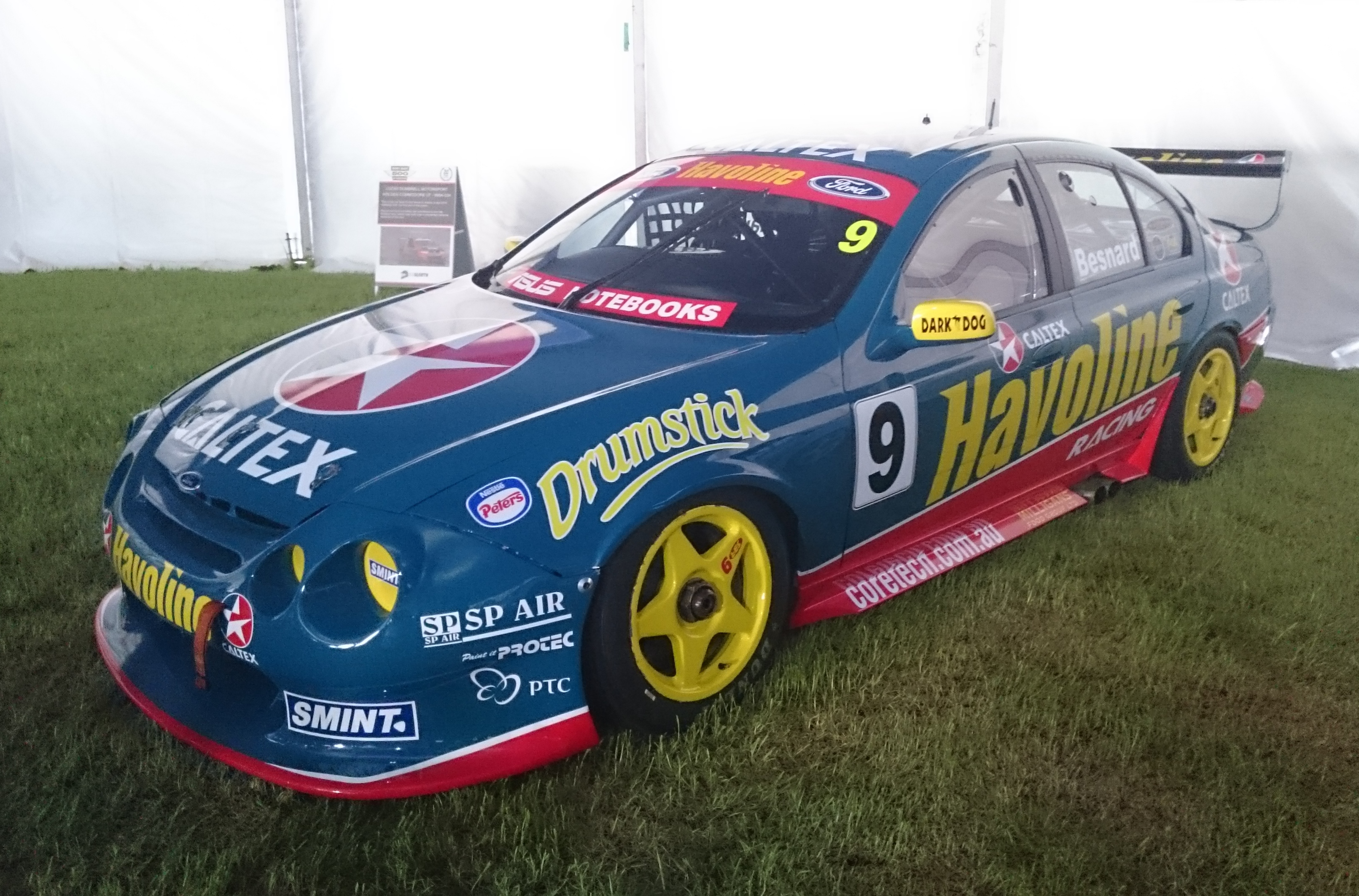
David Besnard and Simon Wills won the race driving a Ford Falcon AU. The car is pictured in 2018.

The 2002 VIP Petfoods Queensland 500 was an endurance race for V8 Supercars staged at Queensland Raceway, Ipswich, Queensland, Australia on 15 September 2002. Race distance was 161 laps of the 3.121 km circuit, totalling 502 km. The event was round nine of the 2002 V8 Supercar Championship Series. It was the fourth and last Queensland 500 to be held for V8 Supercars, although the race name was revived in 2006 for a club level endurance race for Sports and Touring Cars.

The race was won by David Besnard and Simon Wills aboard a Stone Brothers Racing Ford Falcon after late-race leaders, Greg Murphy and Todd Kelly, ran out of fuel with two laps remaining.

== Background ==
The Queensland 500 event was first held in 1999 and would host its foruth iteration in 2002. The racing program would play host to four support categories - Formula Ford, Porsche Cup, Sports Sedans and Improved Production.

Heading into the event, Mark Skaife led the championship by 679 points over nearest competitor and Holden Racing Team teammate, Jason Bright. For this race, both Skaife and Bright would be paired together while the second car would be occupied by veterans Jim Richards and Tomas Mezera.

Unlike most top teams, Stone Brothers Racing elected to keep their full-time drivers separate for the endurance events. Marcos Ambrose would be joined by Paul Weel who vacated his own team for the endurance season. Said team would be occupied by Mark Porter and Geoff Full. David Besnard meanwhile would be joined by Simon Wills who had been recently displaced as a full-time driver from Briggs Motorsport.

Defending event champions, Steven Johnson and Paul Radisich, struggled throughout the course of the year as Dick Johnson Racing encountered persistent performance issues with their cars.

Multiple drivers would make their V8 Supercar debuts this weekend, including motorcycling ace Daryl Beattie, future Indycar champion Will Power and future V8 Supercar champion, Jamie Whincup. Whincup would also win the Australian Formula Ford Championship that same weekend.

== Qualifying ==
=== Provisional ===
Pos	No	Driver	Team	Vehicle	Time
1	4	(Australia) Marcos Ambrose	Stone Brothers Racing	Ford Falcon (AU)	1:10.7937
2	9	(Australia) David Besnard	Stone Brothers Racing	Ford Falcon (AU)	1:10.8019
3	1	(Australia) Jason Bright	Holden Racing Team	Holden Commodore (VX)	1:10.9161
4	66	(Brazil) Max Wilson	Briggs Motor Sport	Ford Falcon (AU)	1:10.9680
5	51	(New Zealand) Greg Murphy	Tom Walkinshaw Racing Australia	Holden Commodore (VX)	1:11.0039
6	21	(Australia) John Bowe	Brad Jones Racing	Ford Falcon (AU)	1:11.0527
7	02	(Australia) Rick Kelly	Holden Young Lions	Holden Commodore (VX)	1:11.1974
8	54	(New Zealand) Craig Baird	Rod Nash Racing	Holden Commodore (VX)	1:11.2306
9	15	(United Kingdom) Andy Priaulx	Tom Walkinshaw Racing Australia	Holden Commodore (VX)	1:11.2855
10	65	(Australia) Matthew White	Briggs Motorsport	Ford Falcon (AU)	1:11.3047
11	11	(Australia) Larry Perkins	Perkins Engineering	Holden Commodore (VX)	1:11.3624
12	16	(Australia) Russell Ingall	Perkins Engineering	Holden Commodore (VX)	1:11.3927
13	31	(Australia) Steven Ellery	Steven Ellery Racing	Ford Falcon (AU)	1:11.4224
14	5	(Australia) Glenn Seton	Glenn Seton Racing	Ford Falcon (AU)	1:11.4441
15	10	(Australia) Mark Larkham	Larkham Motorsport	Ford Falcon (AU)	1:11.4686
Drivers above proceeded to the shootout
16	34	(Australia) Garth Tander	Garry Rogers Motorsport	Holden Commodore (VX)	1:11.4796
17	17	(New Zealand) Paul Radisich	Dick Johnson Racing	Ford Falcon (AU)	1:11.5058
18	40	(Australia) Cameron McLean	Paragon Motorsport	Ford Falcon (AU)	1:11.5292
19	3	(Australia) Cameron McConville	Lansvale Racing Team	Holden Commodore (VX)	1:11.5464
20	2	(New Zealand) Jim Richards	Holden Racing Team	Holden Commodore (VX)	1:11.5998
21	021	(New Zealand) Jason Richards	Team Kiwi Racing	Holden Commodore (VT)	1:11.6002
22	18	(Australia) Greg Ritter	Dick Johnson Racing	Ford Falcon (AU)	1:11.6212
23	00	(Australia) Craig Lowndes	00 Motorsport	Ford Falcon (AU)	1:11.6953
24	888	(United Kingdom) John Cleland	Brad Jones Racing	Ford Falcon (AU)	1:11.7096
25	600	(Australia) Steve Owen	Briggs Motorsport	Ford Falcon (AU)	1:11.7699
26	7	(Australia) Rodney Forbes	00 Motorsport	Ford Falcon (AU)	1:11.7863
27	29	(Australia) Paul Morris	Paul Morris Motorsport	Holden Commodore (VX)	1:11.8167
28	46	(New Zealand) John Faulkner	John Faulkner Racing	Holden Commodore (VX)	1:11.8487
29	161	(Australia) Greg Crick	Halliday Motorsport	Ford Falcon (AU)	1:11.8935
30	75	(Australia) Anthony Tratt	Paul Little Racing	Ford Falcon (AU)	1:12.1289
31	35	(Australia) Jamie Whincup	Garry Rogers Motorsport	Holden Commodore (VX)	1:12.1637
32	22	(Australia) Dugal McDougall	McDougall Motorsport	Holden Commodore (VX)	1:12.3242
33	43	(New Zealand) Mark Porter	Paul Weel Racing	Ford Falcon (AU)	1:12.3702
34	14	(Australia) Daryl Beattie	Imrie Motor Sport	Holden Commodore (VX)	1:12.8706
35	76	(Australia) Andrew Miedecke	Matthew White Racing	Holden Commodore (VT)	1:13.5453

=== Top 15 Shootout ===
Pos	No	Driver	Team	Vehicle	Time
1	4	(Australia) Marcos Ambrose	Stone Brothers Racing	Ford Falcon (AU)	1:10.8726
2	1	(Australia) Jason Bright	Holden Racing Team	Holden Commodore (VX)	1:10.9174
3	21	(Australia) John Bowe	Brad Jones Racing	Ford Falcon (AU)	1:11.1053
4	9	(Australia) David Besnard	Stone Brothers Racing	Ford Falcon (AU)	1:11.1886
5	51	(New Zealand) Greg Murphy	Tom Walkinshaw Racing Australia	Holden Commodore (VX)	1:11.3777
6	66	(Brazil) Max Wilson	Briggs Motor Sport	Ford Falcon (AU)	1:11.3900
7	02	(Australia) Rick Kelly	Holden Young Lions	Holden Commodore (VX)	1:11.4080
8	16	(Australia) Russell Ingall	Perkins Engineering	Holden Commodore (VX)	1:11.4485
9	11	(Australia) Larry Perkins	Perkins Engineering	Holden Commodore (VX)	1:11.8369
10	54	(New Zealand) Craig Baird	Rod Nash Racing	Holden Commodore (VX)	1:11.9253
11	10	(Australia) Mark Larkham	Larkham Motor Sport	Ford Falcon (AU)	1:11.9604
12	65	(Australia) Matthew White	Briggs Motor Sport	Ford Falcon (AU)	1:11.9950
13	15	(United Kingdom) Andy Priaulx	Tom Walkinshaw Racing Australia	Holden Commodore (VX)	1:12.0921
14	31	(Australia) Steven Ellery	Steven Ellery Racing	Ford Falcon (AU)	1:12.3594
15	5	(Australia) Glenn Seton	Glenn Seton Racing	Ford Falcon (AU)	1:13.0188

== Race ==
Pos.	No.	Drivers	Team	Car	Laps	Time/Retired	Grid	Pts
1	9	(Australia) David Besnard (New Zealand) Simon Wills	Stone Brothers Racing	Ford Falcon (AU)	161	03:38:04.2825	4	400
2	16	(Australia) Russell Ingall (New Zealand) Steven Richards	Perkins Engineering	Holden Commodore (VX)	161	+ 2.4729	8	320
3	34	(Australia) Garth Tander (Australia) Jason Bargwanna	Garry Rogers Motorsport	Holden Commodore (VX)	161	+ 6.0250	16	256
4	2	(New Zealand) Jim Richards (Australia) Tomas Mezera	Holden Racing Team	Holden Commodore (VX)	161	+ 7.0601	20	208
5	4	(Australia) Marcos Ambrose (Australia) Paul Weel	Stone Brothers Racing	Ford Falcon (AU)	161	+ 7.8564	1	176
6	00	(Australia) Craig Lowndes (Australia) Neil Crompton	00 Motorsport	Ford Falcon (AU)	161	+ 8.3935	23	160
7	11	(Australia) Larry Perkins (Australia) Paul Dumbrell	Perkins Engineering	Holden Commodore (VX)	161	+ 8.7873	9	144
8	18	(Australia) Greg Ritter (Australia) Alan Jones	Dick Johnson Racing	Ford Falcon (AU)	161	+ 9.9105	22	128
9	21	(Australia) Brad Jones (Australia) John Bowe	Brad Jones Racing	Ford Falcon (AU)	161	+ 10.0330	3	120
10	51	(New Zealand) Greg Murphy (Australia) Todd Kelly	Tom Walkinshaw Racing Australia	Holden Commodore (VX)	161	+ 1:19.5294	5	112
11	10	(Australia) Mark Larkham (Australia) Will Power	Larkham Motorsport	Ford Falcon (AU)	160	+ 1 lap	11	104
12	7	(Australia) Rodney Forbes (Australia) Neal Bates	00 Motorsport	Ford Falcon (AU)	160	+ 1 lap	26	96
13	17	(Australia) Steven Johnson (New Zealand) Paul Radisich	Dick Johnson Racing	Ford Falcon (AU)	160	+ 1 lap	17	88
14	31	(Australia) Steven Ellery (Australia) Luke Youlden	Steven Ellery Racing	Ford Falcon (AU)	160	+ 1 lap	13	80
15	40	(Australia) Cameron McLean (Australia) Tony Scott	Paragon Motorsport	Ford Falcon (AU)	159	+ 2 laps	18	72
16	161	(Australia) Greg Crick (Australia) Phillip Scifleet	Halliday Motorsport	Ford Falcon (AU)	159	+ 2 laps	29	68
17	888	(United Kingdom) John Cleland (Australia) Tim Leahey	Brad Jones Racing	Ford Falcon (AU)	158	+ 3 laps	24	64
18	43	(New Zealand) Mark Porter (Australia) Geoff Full	Paul Weel Racing	Ford Falcon (AU)	158	+ 3 laps	33	60
19	600	(Australia) Steve Owen (Australia) Dale Brede	Briggs Motorsport	Ford Falcon (AU)	157	+ 4 laps	25	56
20	35	(Australia) Max Dumesny (Australia) Jamie Whincup	Garry Rogers Motorsport	Holden Commodore (VX)	156	+ 5 laps	31	52
21	75	(Australia) Anthony Tratt (Australia) Paul Stokell	Paul Little Racing	Ford Falcon (AU)	156	+ 5 laps	30	48
22	021	(New Zealand) Jason Richards (New Zealand) John McIntyre	Team Kiwi Racing	Holden Commodore (VT)	155	+ 6 laps	21	44
23	76	(Australia) Andrew Miedecke (United Kingdom) Tony Quinn	Matthew White Racing	Holden Commodore (VT)	149	+ 12 laps	35	40
24	65	(Australia) Matthew White (Australia) Tony Longhurst	Briggs Motorsport	Ford Falcon (AU)	145	+ 16 laps	12	36
25	14	(Australia) Daryl Beattie (Australia) Christian D'Agostin	Imrie Motor Sport	Holden Commodore (VX)	145	+ 16 laps	34	32
26	29	(Australia) Paul Morris (Australia) Wayne Wakefield	Paul Morris Motorsport	Holden Commodore (VX)	139	+ 22 laps	27	28
Ret	02	(Australia) Rick Kelly (Australia) Nathan Pretty	Holden Young Lions	Holden Commodore (VX)	139	Retired	7	
Ret	15	(United Kingdom) Andy Priaulx (France) Yvan Muller	Tom Walkinshaw Racing Australia	Holden Commodore (VX)	95	Retired	13	
Ret	66	(Brazil) Max Wilson (Australia) Dean Canto	Briggs Motorsport	Ford Falcon (AU)	88	Spun off	6	
Ret	1	(Australia) Mark Skaife (Australia) Jason Bright	Holden Racing Team	Holden Commodore (VX)	62	Engine	2	
Ret	5	(Australia) Glenn Seton (Australia) Owen Kelly	Glenn Seton Racing	Ford Falcon (AU)	61	Retired	15	
Ret	22	(Australia) Dugal McDougall (Australia) Alan Gurr	McDougall Motorsport	Holden Commodore (VX)	53	Mechanical	32	
Ret	54	(New Zealand) Craig Baird (Australia) Mark Noske	Rod Nash Racing	Holden Commodore (VX)	139	Engine	10	
Ret	3	(Australia) Cameron McConville (Australia) Warren Luff	Lansvale Racing Team	Holden Commodore (VX)	33	Collision damage	19	
Ret	46	(New Zealand) John Faulkner (Australia) Rick Bates	John Faulkner Racing	Holden Commodore (VX)	33	Collision damage	28	

== Statistics ==
- Provisional Pole Position – #4 Marcos Ambrose – 1:10.7937
- Pole Position – #4 Marcos Ambrose – 1:10.8726
- Fastest Lap – #51 Greg Murphy – 1:11.7057 – 157 km/h
- Race time of winning car – 03:38:04.2825 – 138 km/h
