= 2007 V8 Supercars Grand Finale =

2007 Supercar Championship event

(Victoria (state)) 2007 Dunlop Grand Finale
Event Information
- Round 14 of 14 in the 2007 V8 Supercar Championship Series
- Date: 30 November–2 December 2007
- Location: Phillip Island, Victoria
- Venue: Phillip Island Grand Prix Circuit
- Weather: Fine

Results
Race 1
Distance	27 laps	120 km
Pole position	Rick Kelly; HSV Dealer Team	1:33.7596
Winner	Garth Tander; HSV Dealer Team	44:22.8901
Race 2
Distance	40 laps	120 km
Winner	Garth Tander; HSV Dealer Team	46:07.8509
Race 3
Distance	40 laps	120 km
Winner	Todd Kelly; Holden Racing Team	44:28.2813
Round Results
First	Garth Tander; HSV Dealer Team	63 pts
Second	Todd Kelly; Holden Racing Team	56 pts
Third	Jamie Whincup; Triple Eight Race Engineering	54 pts

The 2007 Grand Finale was the final round of the 2007 V8 Supercar season. It was held on the weekend of the 30 November to 2 December 2007 at Phillip Island in Victoria.

== Results ==
=== Qualifying ===
Timesheets:

Pos	No	Name	Team	Part 3	Part 2	Part 1
1	1	(Australia) Rick Kelly	HSV Dealer Team	1:33.7596		
2	200	(Australia) Mark Skaife	Holden Racing Team	1:33.9540		
3	88	(Australia) Jamie Whincup	Triple Eight Race Engineering	1:34.0249		
4	22	(Australia) Todd Kelly	Holden Racing Team	1:34.0783		
5	3	(New Zealand) Jason Richards	Tasman Motorsport	1:34.1079		
6	888	(Australia) Craig Lowndes	Triple Eight Race Engineering	1:34.2485		
7	16	(Australia) Garth Tander	HSV Dealer Team	1:34.3521		
8	5	(Australia) Mark Winterbottom	Ford Performance Racing	1:34.3923		
9	9	(Australia) Russell Ingall	Stone Brothers Racing	1:34.6338		
10	18	(Australia) Will Davison	Dick Johnson Racing	1:34.8872		
11	4	(Australia) James Courtney	Stone Brothers Racing		1:34.8119	
12	6	(New Zealand) Steven Richards	Ford Performance Racing		1:34.8300	
13	25	(Australia) Jason Bright	Britek Motorsport		1:34.8861	
14	33	(Australia) Lee Holdsworth	Garry Rogers Motorsport		1:34.9065	
15	51	(New Zealand) Greg Murphy	Tasman Motorsport		1:34.9796	
16	021	(New Zealand) Shane van Gisbergen	Team Kiwi Racing		1:35.3207	
17	7	(Australia) Shane Price	Perkins Engineering		1:35.4777	
18	67	(Australia) Paul Morris	Paul Morris Motorsport		1:35.5867	
19	8	(Brazil) Max Wilson	WPS Racing		1:35.7951	
20	50	(Australia) Cameron McConville	Paul Weel Racing		1:35.9508	
21	55	(Australia) Steve Owen	Rod Nash Racing			1:35.8865
22	17	(Australia) Steven Johnson	Dick Johnson Racing			1:35.8872
23	12	(Australia) Andrew Jones	Brad Jones Racing			1:35.8892
24	10	(Australia) Jason Bargwanna	WPS Racing			1:35.9589
25	11	(Australia) Marcus Marshall	Perkins Engineering			1:36.0704
26	34	(Australia) Dean Canto	Garry Rogers Motorsport			1:36.0862
27	111	(Australia) John Bowe	Paul Cruickshank Racing			1:36.0957
28	39	(Australia) Owen Kelly	Paul Morris Motorsport			1:36.1683
29	20	(Australia) Paul Dumbrell	Paul Weel Racing			1:36.2500
30	14	(New Zealand) Simon Wills	Brad Jones Racing			1:36.2763
31	26	(Australia) Alan Gurr	Britek Motorsport			1:36.5715

=== Race 1 ===
Pos	No.	Name	Team	Vehicle	Laps	Time/Retired	Grid	Points
1	16	(Australia) Garth Tander	HSV Dealer Team	Holden Commodore (VE)	27	44:22.8901	7	24
2	200	(Australia) Mark Skaife	Holden Racing Team	Holden Commodore (VE)	27	44:25.0081	2	20
3	88	(Australia) Jamie Whincup	Triple Eight Race Engineering	Ford Falcon (BF)	27	44:30.2066	3	17
4	888	(Australia) Craig Lowndes	Triple Eight Race Engineering	Ford Falcon (BF)	27	44:31.1292	6	15
5	1	(Australia) Rick Kelly	HSV Dealer Team	Holden Commodore (VE)	27	44:31.9938	1	13
6	22	(Australia) Todd Kelly	Holden Racing Team	Holden Commodore (VE)	22	44:37.5393	4	12
7	5	(Australia) Mark Winterbottom	Ford Performance Racing	Ford Falcon (BF)	27	44:38.0844	8	11
8	9	(Australia) Russell Ingall	Stone Brothers Racing	Ford Falcon (BF)	27	44:38.3849	9	10
9	18	(Australia) Will Davison	Dick Johnson Racing	Ford Falcon (BF)	27	44:39.2158	10	9
10	51	(New Zealand) Greg Murphy	Tasman Motorsport	Holden Commodore (VE)	27	44:40.5244	15	8
11	33	(Australia) Lee Holdsworth	Garry Rogers Motorsport	Holden Commodore (VE)	27	44:40.7724	14	6
12	4	(Australia) James Courtney	Stone Brothers Racing	Ford Falcon (BF)	27	44:49.2402	11	5
13	17	(Australia) Steven Johnson	Dick Johnson Racing	Ford Falcon (BF)	27	44:49.5746	22	4
14	021	(New Zealand) Shane van Gisbergen	Team Kiwi Racing	Ford Falcon (BF)	27	44:52.9996	16	3
15	50	(Australia) Cameron McConville	Paul Weel Racing	Holden Commodore (VE)	27	44:54.8540	20	2
16	7	(Australia) Shane Price	Perkins Engineering	Holden Commodore (VE)	27	44:56.6239	17	
17	3	(New Zealand) Jason Richards	Tasman Motorsport	Holden Commodore (VE)	27	44:56.9721	5	
18	55	(Australia) Steve Owen	Rod Nash Racing	Holden Commodore (VZ)	27	45:00.8395	21	
19	8	(Brazil) Max Wilson	WPS Racing	Ford Falcon (BF)	27	45:02.4155	19	
20	34	(Australia) Dean Canto	Garry Rogers Motorsport	Holden Commodore (VE)	27	45:03.4082	26	
21	12	(Australia) Andrew Jones	Brad Jones Racing	Ford Falcon (BF)	27	45:06.5586	23	
22	11	(Australia) Marcus Marshall	Perkins Engineering	Holden Commodore (VE)	27	45:11.6344	25	
23	10	(Australia) Jason Bargwanna	WPS Racing	Ford Falcon (BF)	27	45:13.7269	24	
24	26	(Australia) Alan Gurr	Britek Motorsport	Ford Falcon (BF)	27	45:18.1815	31	
25	20	(Australia) Paul Dumbrell	Paul Weel Racing	Holden Commodore (VE)	27	45:19.8692	29	
26	14	(New Zealand) Simon Wills	Brad Jones Racing	Ford Falcon (BF)	27	45:24.0657	30	
27	6	(New Zealand) Steven Richards	Ford Performance Racing	Ford Falcon (BF)	27	45:52.2962	12	
28	111	(Australia) John Bowe	Paul Cruickshank Racing	Ford Falcon (BF)	27	45:57.0551	27	
Ret	67	(Australia) Paul Morris	Paul Morris Motorsport	Holden Commodore (VE)	12	Retired	18	
Ret	39	(Australia) Owen Kelly	Paul Morris Motorsport	Holden Commodore (VZ)	7	Retired	28	
Ret	25	(Australia) Jason Bright	Britek Motorsport	Ford Falcon (BF)	6	Retired	13	
Fastest Lap: Mark Skaife (Holden Racing Team) - 1:36.0084 on lap 11

=== Race 2 ===
Pos	No.	Name	Team	Vehicle	Laps	Time/Retired	Grid
1	16	(Australia) Garth Tander	HSV Dealer Team	Holden Commodore (VE)	27		
2	22	(Australia) Todd Kelly	Holden Racing Team	Holden Commodore (VE)	27		
3	88	(Australia) Jamie Whincup	Triple Eight Race Engineering	Ford Falcon (BF)	27		
4	5	(Australia) Mark Winterbottom	Ford Performance Racing	Ford Falcon (BF)	27		
5	200	(Australia) Mark Skaife	Holden Racing Team	Holden Commodore (VE)	27		
6	888	(Australia) Craig Lowndes	Triple Eight Race Engineering	Ford Falcon (BF)	27		
7	4	(Australia) James Courtney	Stone Brothers Racing	Ford Falcon (BF)	27		
8	1	(Australia) Rick Kelly	HSV Dealer Team	Holden Commodore (VE)	27		
9	18	(Australia) Will Davison	Dick Johnson Racing	Ford Falcon (BF)	27		
10	33	(Australia) Lee Holdsworth	Garry Rogers Motorsport	Holden Commodore (VE)	27		
11	17	(Australia) Steven Johnson	Dick Johnson Racing	Ford Falcon (BF)	27		
12	6	(New Zealand) Steven Richards	Ford Performance Racing	Ford Falcon (BF)	27		
13	51	(New Zealand) Greg Murphy	Tasman Motorsport	Holden Commodore (VE)	27		
14	021	(New Zealand) Shane van Gisbergen	Team Kiwi Racing	Ford Falcon (BF)	27		
15	25	(Australia) Jason Bright	Britek Motorsport	Ford Falcon (BF)	27		
16	34	(Australia) Dean Canto	Garry Rogers Motorsport	Holden Commodore (VE)	27		
17	7	(Australia) Shane Price	Perkins Engineering	Holden Commodore (VE)	27		
18	10	(Australia) Jason Bargwanna	WPS Racing	Ford Falcon (BF)	27		
19	9	(Australia) Russell Ingall	Stone Brothers Racing	Ford Falcon (BF)	27		
20	11	(Australia) Marcus Marshall	Perkins Engineering	Holden Commodore (VE)	27		
21	55	(Australia) Steve Owen	Rod Nash Racing	Holden Commodore (VZ)	27		
22	39	(Australia) Owen Kelly	Paul Morris Motorsport	Holden Commodore (VZ)	27		
23	26	(Australia) Alan Gurr	Britek Motorsport	Ford Falcon (BF)	27		
24	8	(Brazil) Max Wilson	WPS Racing	Ford Falcon (BF)	27		
25	111	(Australia) John Bowe	Paul Cruickshank Racing	Ford Falcon (BF)	27		
26	3	(New Zealand) Jason Richards	Tasman Motorsport	Holden Commodore (VE)	27		
Ret	67	(Australia) Paul Morris	Paul Morris Motorsport	Holden Commodore (VE)	19	Retired	
Ret	14	(New Zealand) Simon Wills	Brad Jones Racing	Ford Falcon (BF)	11	Retired	
Ret	50	(Australia) Cameron McConville	Paul Weel Racing	Holden Commodore (VE)	9	Retired	
Ret	20	(Australia) Paul Dumbrell	Paul Weel Racing	Holden Commodore (VE)	9	Retired	
Ret	12	(Australia) Andrew Jones	Brad Jones Racing	Ford Falcon (BF)	2	Retired	
Fastest Lap: Mark Winterbottom (Ford Performance Racing) - 1:36.7754 on lap 9

=== Race 3 ===
Pos	No.	Name	Team	Vehicle	Laps	Time/Retired	Grid
1	22	(Australia) Todd Kelly	Holden Racing Team	Holden Commodore (VE)	27		
2	88	(Australia) Jamie Whincup	Triple Eight Race Engineering	Ford Falcon (BF)	27		
3	888	(Australia) Craig Lowndes	Triple Eight Race Engineering	Ford Falcon (BF)	27		
4	16	(Australia) Garth Tander	HSV Dealer Team	Holden Commodore (VE)	27		
5	5	(Australia) Mark Winterbottom	Ford Performance Racing	Ford Falcon (BF)	27		
6	4	(Australia) James Courtney	Stone Brothers Racing	Ford Falcon (BF)	27		
7	200	(Australia) Mark Skaife	Holden Racing Team	Holden Commodore (VE)	27		
8	18	(Australia) Will Davison	Dick Johnson Racing	Ford Falcon (BF)	27		
9	6	(New Zealand) Steven Richards	Ford Performance Racing	Ford Falcon (BF)	27		
10	1	(Australia) Rick Kelly	HSV Dealer Team	Holden Commodore (VE)	27		
11	33	(Australia) Lee Holdsworth	Garry Rogers Motorsport	Holden Commodore (VE)	27		
12	25	(Australia) Jason Bright	Britek Motorsport	Ford Falcon (BF)	27		
13	67	(Australia) Paul Morris	Paul Morris Motorsport	Holden Commodore (VE)	27		
14	34	(Australia) Dean Canto	Garry Rogers Motorsport	Holden Commodore (VE)	27		
15	8	(Brazil) Max Wilson	WPS Racing	Ford Falcon (BF)	27		
16	10	(Australia) Jason Bargwanna	WPS Racing	Ford Falcon (BF)	27		
17	021	(New Zealand) Shane van Gisbergen	Team Kiwi Racing	Ford Falcon (BF)	27		
18	50	(Australia) Cameron McConville	Paul Weel Racing	Holden Commodore (VE)	27		
19	20	(Australia) Paul Dumbrell	Paul Weel Racing	Holden Commodore (VE)	27		
20	12	(Australia) Andrew Jones	Brad Jones Racing	Ford Falcon (BF)	27		
21	39	(Australia) Owen Kelly	Paul Morris Motorsport	Holden Commodore (VZ)	27		
22	51	(New Zealand) Greg Murphy	Tasman Motorsport	Holden Commodore (VE)	27		
23	111	(Australia) John Bowe	Paul Cruickshank Racing	Ford Falcon (BF)	27		
24	26	(Australia) Alan Gurr	Britek Motorsport	Ford Falcon (BF)	27		
25	11	(Australia) Marcus Marshall	Perkins Engineering	Holden Commodore (VE)	27		
26	9	(Australia) Russell Ingall	Stone Brothers Racing	Ford Falcon (BF)	27		
27	17	(Australia) Steven Johnson	Dick Johnson Racing	Ford Falcon (BF)	27		
28	7	(Australia) Shane Price	Perkins Engineering	Holden Commodore (VE)	26	+ 1 lap	
Ret	55	(Australia) Steve Owen	Rod Nash Racing	Holden Commodore (VZ)	19	Retired	
Ret	3	(New Zealand) Jason Richards	Tasman Motorsport	Holden Commodore (VE)	7	Retired	
Ret	14	(New Zealand) Simon Wills	Brad Jones Racing	Ford Falcon (BF)	2	Retired	
Fastest Lap: Jamie Whincup (Triple Eight Race Engineering) - 1:36.0169 on lap 8
