= Canberra Street Circuit =

Temporary street circuit in Canberra, Australia

- Street Circuit (2000–2002)
- Location: Canberra, Australian Capital Territory
- Coordinates: 35°17′55″S 149°07′39″E
- Owner: ACT Government
- Operator: IMG
- Opened: 9 June 2000; 26 years ago
- Closed: 9 June 2002; 24 years ago
- Architect: Mark Skaife
- Major events: V8 Supercars; Canberra 400 (2000–2002); Australian Formula Ford Championship (2002); Australian Drivers' Championship (2000–2001); Australian Nations Cup Championship (2000–2001)

Street Circuit (2000–2002)
- Length: 3.990 km (2.479 mi)
- Turns: 15
- Race lap record: 1:39.5409 ( (New Zealand) Simon Wills, Reynard 94D, 2000, Formula Holden)

The Canberra Street Circuit was a temporary street circuit located in Canberra, Australian Capital Territory, Australia. It hosted the Canberra 400 for the V8 Supercars series from 2000 to 2002.

== Layout ==
The track, which ran through the Parliamentary Triangle area of Canberra, was designed by then Holden Racing Team driver Mark Skaife. The track's distance was 3.990 km (2.479 mi) and featured 15 turns. Pit straight was chosen on Langton Crescent, which runs alongside the Treasury Building, with the pits being set up in the parallel car park. Cars would head south towards turn 1. Turn 1 was particularly narrow and often caused problems on the first lap of a race. Turn 2 was a long sweeping left-hander onto Queen Victoria Terrace, past the West Block Government Offices, and featured a blind exit.

The turn 3, 4, 5 and 6 complex was referred to by the drivers as the 'Bus Stop' in reference to a similar pattern of corners at the Circuit de Spa-Francorchamps. It was also known as the 'flip-flop'. Cars would go through a quick right-left-straight-left-right, past the Old Parliament House, before heading towards turns 7 and 8 past the National Archives and the East Block Government Offices. Turn 9 was a right-hander turn onto Kings Avenue and the first real straight on the circuit. The cars would then turn right again at turn 10 onto State Circle running in front of the new Parliament House. As the name suggests, State Circle is a full circular road, with the cars continuously turning left, running under the overhead bridges at a top speed of 250 km/h.

Turn 11 was another right-hander onto Flynn Drive. This corner was the only real possible overtaking spot on the track. Cars would then run past the Chinese Embassy towards a roundabout at Turn 12. Cars then continued along Flynn Drive and past the Hyatt Hotel Canberra. Turn 13 was a right-left chicane, called the Canberra Complex, turning into Flynn Place. This corner was one of the few Australian corners taken in first gear. Cars then entered the turn 14 and 15 section, which is a continuous sweeping right-hander, past Lake Burley Griffin and under Commonwealth Avenue bridge before running past the National Library of Australia and back onto Langton Crescent to finish the lap.

== History ==
The circuit hosted three Canberra 400 events in its history. The event was held on the Queen's Birthday long weekend in early June, and saw three different round winners across the three years; Steven Richards, Steven Johnson and Mark Skaife. By race wins, Skaife, the circuit's designer, was the most successful with four.

== Lap records ==
The fastest official race lap records at Canberra Street Circuit are listed as:

Category	Time	Driver	Vehicle	Date
Street Circuit (2000–2002): 3.990 km (2.479 mi)
Formula Holden	1:39.5409	(New Zealand) Simon Wills	Reynard 94D	10 June 2000
V8 Supercars	1:43.8397	(Australia) Craig Lowndes	Ford AU Falcon	10 June 2001
Nations Cup	1:50.3321	(Australia) Paul Stokell	Lamborghini Diablo SV-R	10 June 2001
Formula Ford	1:51.2531	(Australia) Jamie Whincup	Van Diemen RF01	9 June 2002
