= Phillip Island SuperSprint =

(Victoria (state)) Phillip Island SuperSprint
- Race Information
Venue	Phillip Island Grand Prix Circuit
Number of times held	22
First held	1990
Last held	2019
- Race Format
- Race 1
Laps	27
Distance	120 km
- Race 2
Laps	45
Distance	200 km
- Last Event (2019)
- Overall Winner
(New Zealand) Fabian Coulthard	DJR Team Penske
- Race Winners
(New Zealand) Scott McLaughlin	DJR Team Penske
(New Zealand) Fabian Coulthard	DJR Team Penske

The Phillip Island SuperSprint was an annual motor racing event for Supercars, held at the Phillip Island Grand Prix Circuit in Phillip Island, Victoria. The event was a semi-regular part of the Supercars Championship, and its previous incarnations, the Australian Touring Car Championship, Shell Championship Series and V8 Supercars Championship, between 1990 and 2019.

The circuit has also previously hosted championship rounds as the Phillip Island 500, in 1976 and 1977, from 2008 to 2011 and from 2017 to 2018.

== Format ==
The event was staged over a three-day weekend, from Friday to Sunday. Four thirty-minute practice sessions were held, two on Friday and one each on Saturday and Sunday. Saturday featured a three-stage knockout qualifying session which decided the grid positions for the following 120 kilometre sprint race. Sunday featured a repeat of the Saturday qualifying format with a longer 200 km race distance following.

== History ==
While the Phillip Island 500 was a part of the Australian Touring Car Championship (ATCC) in 1976 and 1977, the circuit closed soon after and did not re-open until 1988. In 1990, the circuit hosted a sprint round of the championship for the first time, won by Dick Johnson, his final round win in the ATCC. After an absence from the calendar in 1991 and 1992 as the circuit alternated with Melbourne circuit Sandown Raceway, Phillip Island returned to the ATCC in 1993 and Glenn Seton went on to dominate the event, winning five of the six races held across 1993, 1994 and 1995. In 1994, rain started to fall during the formation lap for the first race and Seton was amongst many drivers to start the race from pitlane to change to wet tyres. As the rain increased, Seton quickly charged through the field and held off Mark Skaife to win.

Despite the early success of Johnson and Seton for Ford, Holden went on to win all seven events from 1996 to 2002. The high speed nature of the circuit has also contributed to several major crashes at the event in its history. In 1996, John Bowe and Craig Lowndes left the circuit at high speed in damp conditions, Bowe hitting an earth embankment and rolling several times. Craig Baird won the only race of his career at the 2000 event. In a near repeat of a crash involving Mark Larkham in 1997, Jason Bargwanna suffered a major crash during the 2002 event when Greg Murphy squeezed him off the track at the start of the race. The contact with the wall sent Bargwanna's car into the tyre wall and a series of rolls before it came to rest in the middle of the track. Later in the event, Max Wilson's car suffered heavy damage when he was hit by Craig Lowndes after Wilson had been spun by Marcos Ambrose. Meanwhile, Paul Romano was given a 150-point penalty for deliberately colliding with Rodney Forbes. The penalty saw Romano finish the season with negative points. Lowndes went on to win the next year at Phillip Island, the first round win for Ford Performance Racing, in a rain-shortened race.

Phillip Island did not feature on the Supercars calendar in 2004 and then from 2005 to 2007 the circuit hosted the Grand Finale, the last round of each season. In 2005, Russell Ingall secured his first championship win at the event, having finished runner-up in the championship four times previously. Going into the 2006 event, Rick Kelly led the championship by a small points margin over Lowndes. Following the first two races, in which Lowndes complained of being unfairly held up by Kelly's teammates, Kelly and Lowndes were tied on points. A controversial incident in the third race saw Kelly make contact with the back of Lowndes, sending Lowndes and Kelly's brother Todd into a spin. Lowndes was stranded in the middle of the track and was hit by Will Davison, sustaining steering damage which caused him to finish in thirty-first place. Despite receiving a drive-through penalty for his role in the incident and finishing eighteenth and a protest from Lowndes' team, Kelly was crowned champion. The event decided the championship again in 2007, with Garth Tander and Jamie Whincup battling for the title. Tander won the event, winning two races, and secured the championship by two points over Whincup.

From 2008 to 2011, the sprint round dropped off to the calendar due to the revival of the Phillip Island 500 two-driver endurance race. The one exception to this was 2009, in which Phillip Island hosted both a sprint event as well as the endurance event, due to the late cancellation of that year's Desert 400 in Bahrain. The Sandown 500 returned to the calendar in 2012, in place of the Phillip Island 500, and Phillip Island reverted to hosting a sprint round of the championship. The 2013 event saw Alexandre Prémat's car leave the track at high speed and hit the driver's door of James Courtney's car. Courtney fractured his tibia in the incident and was forced to miss the next, and final, round of the season at the Sydney 500. In 2014, Jamie Whincup secured a record sixth Australian Touring Car title by winning the second race of the weekend. At the same event, Scott McLaughlin won the first championship event for Volvo since 1986.

The 2016 event, again won by McLaughlin, was the 500th event in Australian Touring Car Championship history. In 2017, the Phillip Island round was extended to 500 km, across two races, and the Phillip Island 500 name was revived. After two years of the Phillip Island 500, the SuperSprint format returned to the event in 2019. For the first time since 2004, Phillip Island was not included in the 2020 Supercars Championship calendar in any capacity. The event was then a late inclusion in the 2021 Supercars Championship, with the event to be run on the date of the cancelled Australian motorcycle Grand Prix, before being cancelled due to the COVID-19 pandemic.

== Winners ==
Year	Driver	Team	Car	Report
1990	(Australia) Dick Johnson	Dick Johnson Racing	Ford Sierra RS500	
1991 – 1992	not held			
1993	(Australia) Glenn Seton	Glenn Seton Racing	Ford EB Falcon	
1994	(Australia) Glenn Seton	Glenn Seton Racing	Ford EB Falcon	Report
1995	(Australia) Glenn Seton	Glenn Seton Racing	Ford EF Falcon	
1996	(Australia) Larry Perkins	Perkins Engineering	Holden VR Commodore	
1997	(Australia) Russell Ingall	Perkins Engineering	Holden VS Commodore	
1998	(Australia) Craig Lowndes	Holden Racing Team	Holden VS Commodore	
1999	(Australia) Mark Skaife	Holden Racing Team	Holden VT Commodore	
2000	(Australia) Garth Tander	Garry Rogers Motorsport	Holden VT Commodore	
2001	(Australia) Mark Skaife	Holden Racing Team	Holden VX Commodore	Report
2002	(Australia) Mark Skaife	Holden Racing Team	Holden VX Commodore	Report
2003	(Australia) Craig Lowndes	Ford Performance Racing	Ford BA Falcon	
2004	not held			
2005	(Australia) Marcos Ambrose	Stone Brothers Racing	Ford BA Falcon	
2006	(Australia) Todd Kelly	Holden Racing Team	Holden VZ Commodore	
2007	(Australia) Garth Tander	HSV Dealer Team	Holden VE Commodore	Report
2008	not held ^{1}			
2009^{2}	(Australia) Jamie Whincup	Triple Eight Race Engineering	Ford FG Falcon	Report
2010 – 2011	not held ^{1}			
2012	(New Zealand) Shane van Gisbergen	Stone Brothers Racing	Ford FG Falcon	Report
2013	(Australia) Jamie Whincup	Triple Eight Race Engineering	Holden VF Commodore	
2014	(New Zealand) Scott McLaughlin	Garry Rogers Motorsport	Volvo S60	Report
2015	(Australia) Craig Lowndes	Triple Eight Race Engineering	Holden VF Commodore	
2016	(New Zealand) Scott McLaughlin	Garry Rogers Motorsport	Volvo S60	Report
2017 – 2018	not held ^{1}			
2019	(New Zealand) Fabian Coulthard	DJR Team Penske	Ford Mustang GT	Report

Notes

- ^1 – From 2008 to 2011 and from 2017 to 2018, the Phillip Island Grand Prix Circuit hosted the Phillip Island 500.
- ^2 – In 2009, the Phillip Island Grand Prix Circuit also hosted a second round of the championship, the 2009 Phillip Island 500.

== Multiple winners ==
=== By driver ===
Wins	Driver	Years
3	(Australia) Glenn Seton	1993, 1994, 1995
3	(Australia) Mark Skaife	1999, 2001, 2002
3	(Australia) Craig Lowndes	1998, 2003, 2015
2	(Australia) Garth Tander	2000, 2007
2	(Australia) Jamie Whincup	2009, 2013
2	(New Zealand) Scott McLaughlin	2014, 2016

=== By team ===
Wins	Team
5	Holden Racing Team
3	Glenn Seton Racing
3	Triple Eight Race Engineering
3	Garry Rogers Motorsport
2	Perkins Engineering
2	Stone Brothers Racing
2	DJR Team Penske^{3}

=== By manufacturer ===
Wins	Manufacturer
11	Holden
9	Ford
2	Volvo

Notes

- ^3 – DJR Team Penske was known as Dick Johnson Racing from 1980 to 2014, hence their statistics are combined.

== Event names and sponsors ==
- 1990, 1993–2003: Phillip Island
- 2005: BigPond Grand Finale
- 2006: Caterpillar Grand Finale
- 2007: Dunlop Grand Finale
- 2009: The Island 300
- 2012: Phillip Island 300
- 2013: Sargent Security Phillip Island 360
- 2014: Plus Fitness Phillip Island 400
- 2015–16, 2019: WD-40 Phillip Island SuperSprint

== See also ==
- Phillip Island 500
- Grand Finale
- List of Australian Touring Car Championship races
