= 2002 V8 Supercars Phillip Island round =

2002 Supercar Championship event

(Victoria (state)) 2002 Phillip Island V8 Supercar round
Event Information
- Round 2 of 13 in the 2002 V8 Supercar Championship Series
- Date: 12-14 April 2002
- Location: Phillip Island, Victoria
- Venue: Phillip Island Grand Prix Circuit
- Weather: Fine

Results
Race 1
Distance	34 laps	150 km
Pole position	Marcos Ambrose; Stone Brothers Racing	1:45.5613
Winner	Marcos Ambrose; Stone Brothers Racing	55:08.2201
Race 2
Distance	34 laps	150 km
Winner	Mark Skaife; Holden Racing Team	01:03:43.5360
Round Results
First	Mark Skaife; Holden Racing Team	180 pts
Second	Todd Kelly; K-mart Racing Team	144 pts
Third	Paul Radisich; Dick Johnson Racing	100 pts

The 2002 Phillip Island V8 Supercar round was the second round of the 2002 V8 Supercar Championship Series. It was held on the weekend of 12 to 14 April at the Phillip Island Grand Prix Circuit in Victoria, Australia.

== Race results ==
=== Pre-qualifying ===
Pos	No	Name	Team	Vehicle	Time
1	18	(New Zealand) Paul Radisich	Dick Johnson Racing	Ford Falcon (AU)	1:34.1110
2	21	(Australia) Brad Jones	Brad Jones Racing	Ford Falcon (AU)	1:34.5891
3	7	(Australia) Rodney Forbes	00 Motorsport	Ford Falcon (AU)	1:34.8880
4	3	(Australia) Cameron McConville	Lansvale Racing Team	Holden Commodore (VX)	1:34.9488
5	43	(Australia) Paul Weel	Paul Weel Racing	Ford Falcon (AU)	1:35.0031
6	46	(New Zealand) John Faulkner	John Faulkner Racing	Holden Commodore (VT)	1:35.1193
7	22	(Australia) Dugal McDougall	McDougall Motorsport	Holden Commodore (VX)	1:35.6676
DNQ	29	(Australia) Paul Morris	Paul Morris Motorsport	Holden Commodore (VX)	1:35.7289
DNQ	71	(Australia) Greg Ritter	Dick Johnson Racing	Ford Falcon (AU)	1:35.9031
DNQ	76	(Australia) Matthew White	Matthew White Racing	Holden Commodore (VS)	1:36.2258
DNQ	40	(Australia) Cameron McLean	Paragon Motorsport	Ford Falcon (AU)	1:36.2571
DNQ	75	(Australia) Anthony Tratt	Paul Little Racing	Ford Falcon (AU)	1:36.5285
DNQ	14	(Australia) Tomas Mezera	Imrie Motor Sport	Holden Commodore (VX)	1:34.9488

=== Qualifying ===
Pos	No	Name	Team	Vehicle	Time
1	4	(Australia) Marcos Ambrose	Stone Brothers Racing	Ford Falcon (AU)	1:44.7753
2	1	(Australia) Mark Skaife	Holden Racing Team	Holden Commodore (VX)	1:44.9265
3	2	(Australia) Jason Bright	Holden Racing Team	Holden Commodore (VX)	1:45.3749
4	8	(Australia) Russell Ingall	Perkins Engineering	Holden Commodore (VX)	1:45.5527
5	18	(New Zealand) Paul Radisich	Dick Johnson Racing	Ford Falcon (AU)	1:45.7124
6	9	(Australia) David Besnard	Stone Brothers Racing	Ford Falcon (AU)	1:46.0064
7	65	(Brazil) Max Wilson	Briggs Motor Sport	Ford Falcon (AU)	1:46.0248
8	16	(New Zealand) Steven Richards	Perkins Engineering	Holden Commodore (VX)	1:46.0344
9	15	(Australia) Todd Kelly	Kmart Racing Team	Holden Commodore (VX)	1:46.0599
10	35	(Australia) Jason Bargwanna	Garry Rogers Motorsport	Holden Commodore (VX)	1:46.1439
11	51	(New Zealand) Greg Murphy	Kmart Racing Team	Holden Commodore (VX)	1:46.1992
12	66	(Australia) Tony Longhurst	Briggs Motor Sport	Ford Falcon (AU)	1:46.2234
13	00	(Australia) Craig Lowndes	00 Motorsport	Ford Falcon (AU)	1:46.2459
14	34	(Australia) Garth Tander	Garry Rogers Motorsport	Holden Commodore (VX)	1:46.2834
15	021	(New Zealand) Jason Richards	Team Kiwi Racing	Holden Commodore (VX)	1:46.3698
16	31	(Australia) Steven Ellery	Steven Ellery Racing	Ford Falcon (AU)	1:46.3704
17	02	(Australia) Rick Kelly	Holden Racing Team	Holden Commodore (VX)	1:46.4819
18	17	(Australia) Steven Johnson	Dick Johnson Racing	Ford Falcon (AU)	1:46.4875
19	11	(Australia) Larry Perkins	Perkins Engineering	Holden Commodore (VX)	1:46.6077
20	888	(Australia) John Bowe	Brad Jones Racing	Ford Falcon (AU)	1:46.6822
21	46	(New Zealand) John Faulkner	John Faulkner Racing	Holden Commodore (VT)	1:46.2234
22	600	(New Zealand) Simon Wills	Briggs Motor Sport	Ford Falcon (AU)	1:46.8206
23	54	(New Zealand) Craig Baird	Rod Nash Racing	Holden Commodore (VX)	1:46.9856
24	7	(Australia) Rodney Forbes	00 Motorsport	Ford Falcon (AU)	1:47.0252
25	43	(Australia) Paul Weel	Paul Weel Racing	Ford Falcon (AU)	1:47.0453
26	24	(Australia) Paul Romano	Romano Racing	Holden Commodore (VX)	1:47.4074
27	5	(Australia) Glenn Seton	Glenn Seton Racing	Ford Falcon (AU)	1:47.4976
28	21	(Australia) Brad Jones	Brad Jones Racing	Ford Falcon (AU)	1:47.5618
29	10	(Australia) Mark Larkham	Larkham Motor Sport	Ford Falcon (AU)	1:47.9429
30	27	(Australia) Neil Crompton	00 Motorsport	Ford Falcon (AU)	1:48.0071
31	3	(Australia) Cameron McConville	Lansvale Racing Team	Holden Commodore (VX)	1:48.0479
32	22	(Australia) Dugal McDougall	McDougall Motorsport	Holden Commodore (VX)	1:49.6022

=== Top Ten Shootout ===
Pos	No	Name	Team	Vehicle	Time
1	4	(Australia) Marcos Ambrose	Stone Brothers Racing	Ford Falcon (AU)	1:45.5613
2	2	(Australia) Jason Bright	Holden Racing Team	Holden Commodore (VX)	1:45.6393
3	1	(Australia) Mark Skaife	Holden Racing Team	Holden Commodore (VX)	1:45.8145
4	9	(Australia) David Besnard	Stone Brothers Racing	Ford Falcon (AU)	1:45.8236
5	8	(Australia) Russell Ingall	Perkins Engineering	Holden Commodore (VX)	1:46.3835
6	18	(New Zealand) Paul Radisich	Dick Johnson Racing	Ford Falcon (AU)	1:46.7534
7	15	(Australia) Todd Kelly	Kmart Racing Team	Holden VX Commodore	1:47.8224
8	16	(New Zealand) Steven Richards	Perkins Engineering	Holden Commodore (VX)	1:48.1843
9	35	(Australia) Jason Bargwanna	Garry Rogers Motorsport	Holden Commodore (VX)	1:49.2527
10	65	(Brazil) Max Wilson	Briggs Motor Sport	Ford Falcon (AU)	1:56.1645

=== Race 1 ===
Pos	No	Name	Team	Vehicle	Laps	Time/Retired	Grid
1	4	(Australia) Marcos Ambrose	Stone Brothers Racing	Ford Falcon (AU)	34	55min 08.2201sec	1
2	1	(Australia) Mark Skaife	Holden Racing Team	Holden Commodore (VX)	34	+ 0.159 s	3
3	15	(Australia) Todd Kelly	Kmart Racing Team	Holden Commodore (VX)	34	+ 37.527 s	7
4	2	(Australia) Jason Bright	Holden Racing Team	Holden Commodore (VX)	34	+ 40.160 s	2
5	9	(Australia) David Besnard	Stone Brothers Racing	Ford Falcon (AU)	34	+ 42.642 s	4
6	66	(Australia) Tony Longhurst	Briggs Motor Sport	Ford Falcon (AU)	34	+ 50.153 s	12
7	18	(New Zealand) Paul Radisich	Dick Johnson Racing	Ford Falcon (AU)	34	+ 56.893 s	6
8	17	(Australia) Steven Johnson	Dick Johnson Racing	Ford Falcon (AU)	34	+ 1:03.289 s	18
9	888	(Australia) John Bowe	Brad Jones Racing	Ford Falcon (AU)	34	+ 1:03.607 s	20
10	5	(Australia) Glenn Seton	Glenn Seton Racing	Ford Falcon (AU)	34	+ 1:10.742 s	27
11	3	(Australia) Cameron McConville	Lansvale Racing Team	Holden Commodore (VX)	34	+ 1:14.269 s	31
12	00	(Australia) Craig Lowndes	00 Motorsport	Ford Falcon (AU)	34	+ 1:15.274 s	13
13	600	(New Zealand) Simon Wills	Briggs Motor Sport	Ford Falcon (AU)	34	+ 1:17.130 s	22
14	11	(Australia) Larry Perkins	Perkins Engineering	Holden Commodore (VX)	34	+ 1:18.402 s	19
15	54	(New Zealand) Craig Baird	Rod Nash Racing	Holden Commodore (VX)	34	+ 1:19.501 s	23
16	27	(Australia) Neil Crompton	00 Motorsport	Ford Falcon (AU)	34	+ 1:20.376 s	30
17	8	(Australia) Russell Ingall	Perkins Engineering	Holden Commodore (VX)	34	+ 1:21.528 s	5
18	65	(Brazil) Max Wilson	Briggs Motor Sport	Ford Falcon (AU)	33	+ 1 lap	10
19	24	(Australia) Paul Romano	Romano Racing	Holden Commodore (VX)	33	+ 1 lap	26
20	02	(Australia) Rick Kelly	Holden Racing Team	Holden Commodore (VX)	33	+ 1 lap	17
21	22	(Australia) Dugal McDougall	McDougall Motorsport	Holden Commodore (VX)	33	+ 1 lap	32
22	31	(Australia) Steven Ellery	Steven Ellery Racing	Ford Falcon (AU)	33	+ 1 lap	16
23	21	(Australia) Brad Jones	Brad Jones Racing	Ford Falcon (AU)	33	+ 1 lap	28
24	34	(Australia) Garth Tander	Garry Rogers Motorsport	Holden Commodore (VX)	33	+ 1 lap	14
25	43	(Australia) Paul Weel	Paul Weel Racing	Ford Falcon (AU)	29	+ 5 laps	25
Ret	16	(New Zealand) Steven Richards	Perkins Engineering	Holden Commodore (VX)	17	Retired	8
Ret	46	(New Zealand) John Faulkner	John Faulkner Racing	Holden Commodore (VX)	7	Accident damage	21
Ret	021	(New Zealand) Jason Richards	Team Kiwi Racing	Holden Commodore (VX)	2	Spun off	15
Ret	10	(Australia) Mark Larkham	Larkham Motor Sport	Ford Falcon (AU)	0	Spun off	29
Ret	7	(Australia) Rodney Forbes	00 Motorsport	Ford Falcon (AU)	0	Spun off	24
Ret	35	(Australia) Jason Bargwanna	Garry Rogers Motorsport	Holden Commodore (VX)	0	Accident	9
Exc	51	(New Zealand) Greg Murphy	Kmart Racing Team	Holden Commodore (VX)	0	Excluded	11

=== Race 2 ===
Pos	No	Name	Team	Vehicle	Laps	Time/Retired	Grid
1	1	(Australia) Mark Skaife	Holden Racing Team	Holden Commodore (VX)	34	1hr 03min 43.5360sec	2
2	15	(Australia) Todd Kelly	Kmart Racing Team	Holden Commodore (VX)	34	+ 7.602 s	3
3	18	(New Zealand) Paul Radisich	Dick Johnson Racing	Ford Falcon (AU)	34	+ 13.876 s	7
4	3	(Australia) Cameron McConville	Lansvale Racing Team	Holden Commodore (VX)	34	+ 14.740 s	11
5	02	(Australia) Rick Kelly	Holden Racing Team	Holden Commodore (VX)	34	+ 16.617 s	20
6	34	(Australia) Garth Tander	Garry Rogers Motorsport	Holden Commodore (VX)	34	+ 19.521 s	24
7	66	(Australia) Tony Longhurst	Briggs Motor Sport	Ford Falcon (AU)	34	+ 22.190 s	6
8	5	(Australia) Glenn Seton	Glenn Seton Racing	Ford Falcon (AU)	34	+ 23.322 s	10
9	2	(Australia) Jason Bright	Holden Racing Team	Holden Commodore (VX)	34	+ 23.522 s	4
10	17	(Australia) Steven Johnson	Dick Johnson Racing	Ford Falcon (AU)	34	+ 26.029 s	8
11	43	(Australia) Paul Weel	Paul Weel Racing	Ford Falcon (AU)	34	+ 27.279 s	25
12	54	(New Zealand) Craig Baird	Rod Nash Racing	Holden Commodore (VX)	34	+ 27.625 s	15
13	27	(Australia) Neil Crompton	00 Motorsport	Ford Falcon (AU)	34	+ 27.858 s	16
14	11	(Australia) Larry Perkins	Perkins Engineering	Holden Commodore (VX)	34	+ 35.958 s	14
15	8	(Australia) Russell Ingall	Perkins Engineering	Holden Commodore (VX)	34	+ 36.857 s	17
16	600	(New Zealand) Simon Wills	Briggs Motor Sport	Ford Falcon (AU)	34	+ 37.559 s	13
17	51	(New Zealand) Greg Murphy	Kmart Racing Team	Holden Commodore (VX)	34	+ 39.726 s	31
18	21	(Australia) Brad Jones	Brad Jones Racing	Ford Falcon (AU)	34	+ 44.349 s	23
19	10	(Australia) Mark Larkham	Larkham Motor Sport	Ford Falcon (AU)	34	+ 45.875 s	29
20	16	(New Zealand) Steven Richards	Perkins Engineering	Holden Commodore (VX)	34	+ 49.025 s	26
21	22	(Australia) Dugal McDougall	McDougall Motorsport	Holden Commodore (VX)	34	+ 1:11.536 s	21
22	888	(Australia) John Bowe	Brad Jones Racing	Ford Falcon (AU)	34	+ 1:16.453 s	9
23	9	(Australia) David Besnard	Stone Brothers Racing	Ford Falcon (AU)	34	+ 1:23.620 s	5
24	31	(Australia) Steven Ellery	Steven Ellery Racing	Ford Falcon (AU)	32	+ 2 laps	22
25	021	(New Zealand) Jason Richards	Team Kiwi Racing	Holden Commodore (VX)	29	+ 5 laps	28
Ret	46	(New Zealand) John Faulkner	John Faulkner Racing	Holden Commodore (VX)	26	Retired	27
Ret	4	(Australia) Marcos Ambrose	Stone Brothers Racing	Ford Falcon (AU)	14	Accident damage	1
Ret	65	(Brazil) Max Wilson	Briggs Motor Sport	Ford Falcon (AU)	13	Accident	18
Ret	00	(Australia) Craig Lowndes	00 Motorsport	Ford Falcon (AU)	13	Accident	12
Ret	24	(Australia) Paul Romano	Romano Racing	Holden Commodore (VX)	1	Accident	19
Ret	7	(Australia) Rodney Forbes	00 Motorsport	Ford Falcon (AU)	1	Accident	30
