= Walkinshaw TWG Racing =

Australian motor racing team

- Manufacturer: Toyota
- Owner: Ryan Walkinshaw; Scott O'Donnell; TWG Motorsports
- Team Principal: Carl Faux
- Race Drivers: 1 (Australia) Chaz Mostert; 2 (New Zealand) Ryan Wood
- Race Engineers: 1 Sam Scaffidi; 2 Richard Harris
- Chassis: Toyota GR Supra
- Debut: 1990
- Drivers' Championships: 7 (1996, 1998, 1999, 2000, 2001, 2002, 2025)
- Teams' Championships: 5 (1999, 2000, 2001, 2002, 2009)
- Round wins: 73
- Race wins: 191
- 2023 position: 96
- 6th (3487pts)

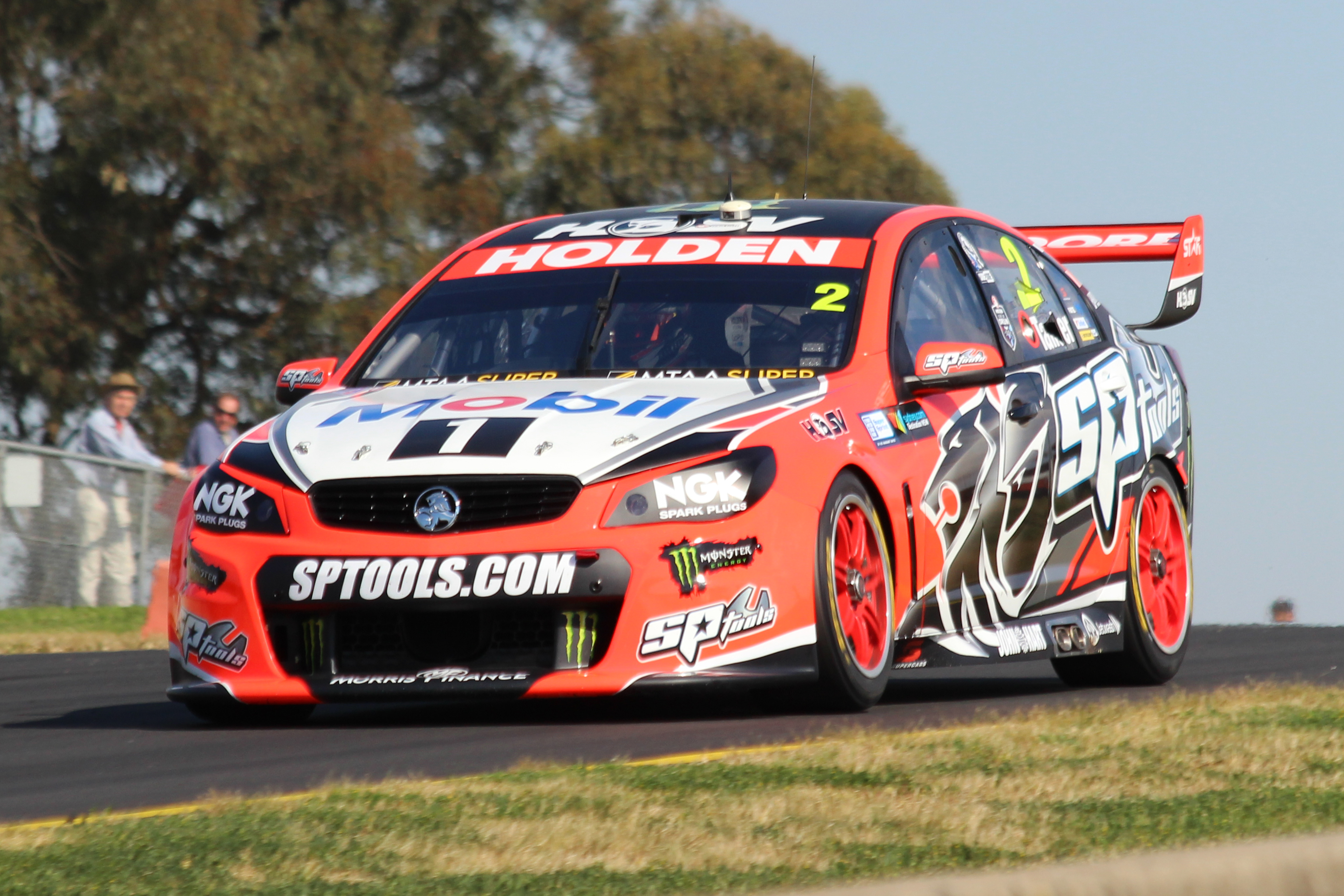
Garth Tander at the 2015 Sydney Motorsport Park Super Sprint.

Walkinshaw TWG Racing is an Australian motor racing team based in the Melbourne suburb of Clayton. The team, initially branded as the Holden Racing Team, used to field Holden Commodores in the Supercars Championship before making the switch to Ford Mustangs for the 2023 season, then the switch to Toyota GR Supras in 2026. The two cars are currently driven by Ryan Wood and Chaz Mostert.

Formed in 1990 as the Holden Racing Team, it is one of the most successful Supercars Championship teams in the history of the category, having won the drivers' championship seven times, the teams' championship five times and the Bathurst 1000, eight times. In 2017, the Holden Racing Team name was transferred by Holden to Triple Eight Race Engineering and the team was renamed Mobil 1 HSV Racing. For the 2018 season, the team was rebranded Walkinshaw Andretti United, as Andretti Autosport and United Autosports become shareholders.

From 2026 onwards, the team has been known as Walkinshaw TWG Racing, after United Autosports sold its stake in the team and Andretti Autosport was taken over by TWG Motorsports in 2023. It fields Toyota GR Supras.

== 1980s ==
Holden Racing Team logo

As part of the joint venture established in 1987 between Tom Walkinshaw and Holden to form Holden Special Vehicles, Tom Walkinshaw Racing (TWR) was to run Holden's motor sport programme. TWR were responsible for designing the Holden VL Commodore SS Group A SV, which was homologated for racing in August 1988 after Holden Special Vehicles completed the required 500.

For 1988 it was decided to contract out the racing programme to Perkins Engineering although a car built by TWR in England was raced by Tom Walkinshaw at the RAC Tourist Trophy and Bathurst 1000.

For 1989 it was planned for TWR to run the full season with two cars. Win Percy and Neil Crompton were announced as the team's drivers and a second VL Commodore built in England was tested in Holden Racing Team livery at Calder but with the likelihood of being uncompetitive against the Ford Sierra RS500s, the Australian Touring Car Championship programme was cancelled. For the Sandown 500, Bathurst 1000 and Grand Prix support races, the programme was once again contracted to Perkins Engineering.

== 1990s ==
=== 1990 ===
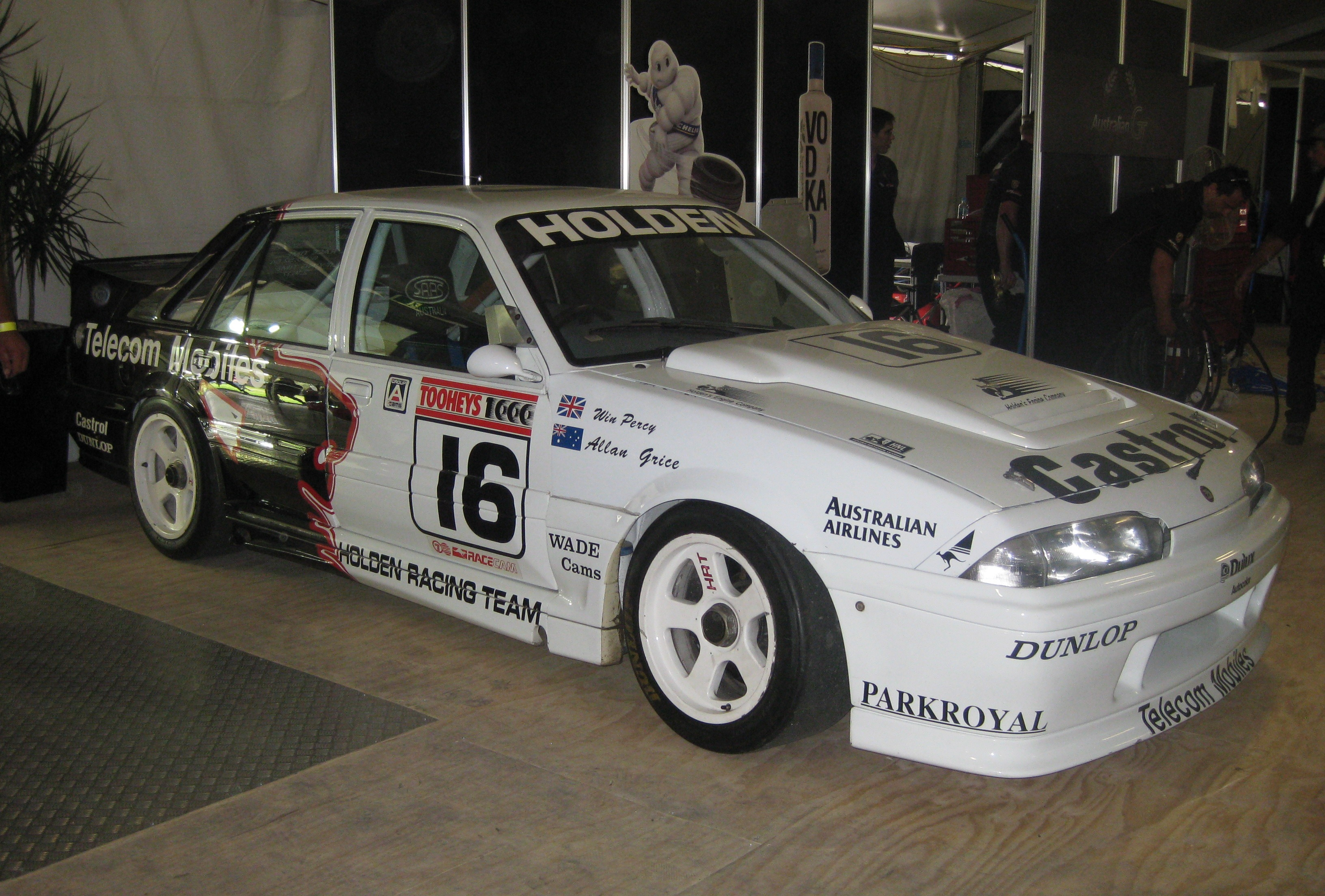
The 1990 Bathurst 1000 winning VL Commodore.

In 1990 the operation was brought in house with longtime TWR driver Win Percy moving to Melbourne to fill the role of both driver and team manager. Percy drove at all Australian Touring Car Championship rounds except for Mallala where Neil Crompton drove after Percy returned to England for a family bereavement. Percy's highest qualifying position was sixth at Winton and highest race result a third place at Lakeside, and he finished eighth overall in the championship.

At the Sandown 500, Percy and Crompton qualified the car fourth, however did not finish the race. For the Bathurst 1000 the team entered two cars with Percy, against the wishes of Holden and Tom Walkinshaw, recruiting Allan Grice to co-drive the lead car. Crompton was joined by Brad Jones. With Percy suffering a shoulder injury, his decision to hire Grice was vindicated with the latter handling the bulk of the driving on the way to an unexpected victory, the second car finished fifth.

=== 1991 ===
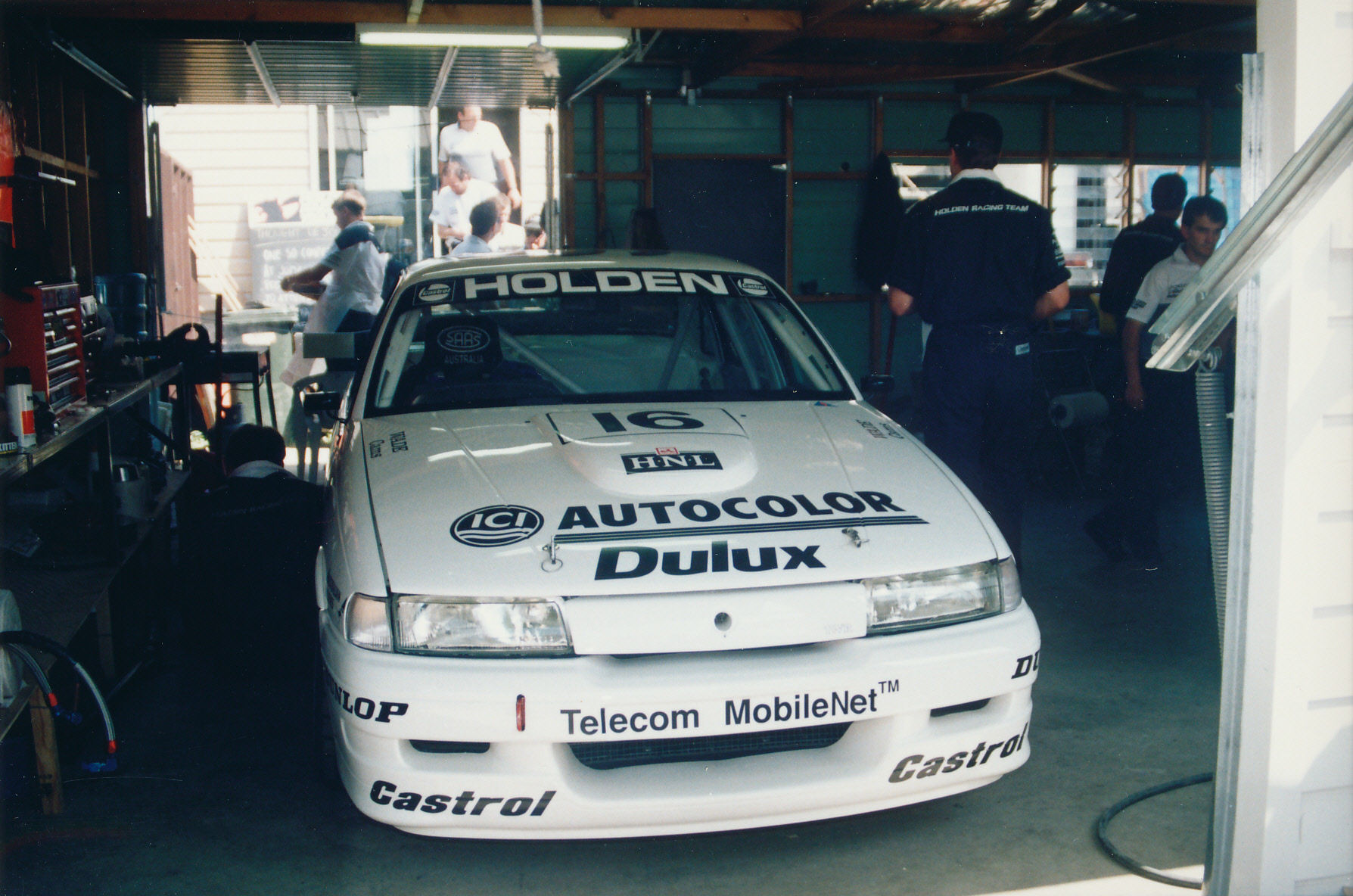
Holden Commodore VN of the Holden Racing Team at the 1991 Bathurst 1000

For 1991 the VN Commodore was homologated with Win Percy driving in all ATCC rounds except Lakeside where Allan Grice substituted while Percy competed in an event in Europe. Percy again finished eighth in the championship. At the Bathurst 1000, Percy and Grice teamed together to finish second, with the second car of Neil Crompton and Brad Jones not finishing after running out of fuel.

=== 1992 ===
With Win Percy having decided to return to England, Tomas Mezera was hired. Due to a budget shortfall and the need to develop the VP Commodore for the new V8 formula, HRT only competed at the Sandown, Lakeside and Eastern Creek rounds. Two 1993 spec VP Commodores were raced at the Sandown 500 with Mezera and Brad Jones finishing third while Percy and Grice finished fifth at the Bathurst 1000. Mezera and Jones drove two cars at the Grand Prix support races.

=== 1993 ===
With budget problems compounded by Castrol deciding to transfer its funding to Perkins Engineering, at the beginning of 1993 there was some doubt as to whether the team would compete in the 1993 Australian Touring Car Championship. Former 1987 World 500cc champion Wayne Gardner with only one touring car start was signed as the team's driver with Tomas Mezera's participation being dependent on additional sponsorship being secured, however he would ultimately compete in all nine rounds.

At the Sandown 500 Mezera was joined by Michael Preston, with Brad Jones and Allan Grice in the second car. For the Bathurst 1000 Mezera was joined by Win Percy with Gardner and Jones driving the second car to a third-place finish. Gardner won a race at the Australian Grand Prix.

The team's season was dominated by off-track politics. Before the end of the championship chief engineer Wally Storey and team manager Neal Lowe had left the team with Mezera appointed as acting team manager. Before the Sandown 500, Gardner was suspended for two weeks from the team. HRT alleged Gardner was trying to poach the team's sponsors for his own operation, Gardner claimed that he was acting on a request by the team to help secure extra funding. Gardner secured funding from Coca-Cola for 1994, but his proposal for taking part ownership was rejected by Tom Walkinshaw and he elected to form Wayne Gardner Racing. At Bathurst, Jeff Grech commenced what would ultimately be a very successful stint as team manager.

=== 1994 ===
In 1994 Peter Brock was signed to drive for the team. In spite of some resistance by some within Holden after the manufacturer's split with Brock's Holden Dealer Team in 1987, the substantial Mobil and NGK sponsorship he brought to the team made the deal irresistible. Both of these sponsors remain with the team as of 2020. The team was competitive throughout the ATCC, with Brock taking the round win at Eastern Creek and second places at Sandown, Symmons Plains, Philip Island and Oran Park on the way to a third-place finish, Mezera finished ninth.

Brock's win at Eastern Creek was the HRT's first ever ATCC round win.

For the endurance events, Brad Jones and Rickard Rydell (who was driving a Volvo 850 for TWR in the British Touring Car Championship) were earmarked to drive the second car. However, with Rydell's wife due to give birth, he was replaced by Craig Lowndes for the Sandown 500. After finishing fifth and setting the fastest lap of the four drivers, HRT elected to retain Lowndes for the Bathurst 1000. Despite Lowndes crashing in the warm up and spinning mid race, a stellar double stint from Jones saw the car finish second. The lead car crashed late in the race.

=== 1995 ===
For 1995 the VR Commodore was introduced. Brock remained a championship contender at the final round at Oran Park, finishing third with Mezera fifth. Lowndes and Greg Murphy ran the second car at the Sandown 500 and Bathurst 1000 however neither finished either race. After the Grand Prix support race it was announced that Lowndes would drive for the team full-time in 1996, he would take Mezera's seat for the season ending Brock Challenge at Calder.

=== 1996 ===
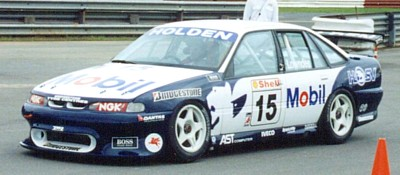
The 1996 VR Commodore of Craig Lowndes.

With the demise of tobacco sponsorship, HRT had been able to lure many key personnel from Gibson Motorsport. This helped the team dominate the 1996 season with Craig Lowndes winning the ATCC, Sandown 500 and Bathurst 1000, the latter two in partnership with Greg Murphy. Brock finished the series in fourth being joined again by Tomas Mezera for the endurance races. With Lowndes headed to Europe in 1997 to compete in F3000, Murphy was hired as his replacement and debuted at two races in New Zealand at the end of the year.

=== 1997 ===
The year saw a number of mechanical failures with the VS Commodores that prevented HRT from following on from the success of 1996. One highlight of the year were one-two finishes at both Symmons Plains and Wanneroo. Just before the Eastern Creek round of the series, Brock announced his retirement from full-time racing. Overall, Murphy and Brock finished the year fourth and sixth respectively. Lowndes returned to drive in the endurance events with Murphy, while Mark Skaife co-drove with Brock. Lowndes and Murphy won the Sandown 500 while despite Skaife winning pole at both events, he and Brock failed to finish.

At selected events a third car was entered under the Holden Young Lions banner with Jason Bargwanna, Todd Kelly, Mark Noske and Stephen White driving. Bargwanna and Noske drove a car in the endurance races.

=== 1998 ===
For 1998 Lowndes returned to HRT and Skaife succeeded Brock. With the Holden Young Lions program sub-contracted to Gibson Motorsport, HRT returned to a two-car team except for the Calder round where Greg Murphy debuted the VT Commodore. Lowndes won the ATCC with Skaife finishing third. Lowndes and Skaife finished second at the Sandown 500. At the Bathurst 1000 despite winning pole position and leading much of the race, Lowndes and Skaife suffered a number of tyre failures finishing sixth. The second car of Greg Murphy and Mark Noske suffered a crash in late qualifying causing them to miss the shootout and cause endless problems throughout the race including the same tyre woes that Lowndes and Skaife suffered and retired on lap 86.

=== 1999 ===
Lowndes again won the ATCC with Skaife third despite Lowndes having to miss the Symmons Plains round after a car destroying rollover at Calder. Endurance driver Cameron McConville deputised in Lowndes's 1996 winning VS Commodore. For the Queensland 500 and Bathurst 1000, Lowndes was joined by McConville finishing third and second respectively. Skaife was joined by Paul Morris finishing third at Bathurst.

A third car was entered in the endurance races under the Holden Young Lions with Todd Kelly and Mark Noske driving.

== 2000s ==
=== 2000 ===
In 2000 Skaife won the championship with Lowndes finishing in third. At the Queensland 500 Lowndes and Skaife teamed together to win. The second car was driven by Todd Kelly and Nathan Pretty, however failed to finish. At the Bathurst 1000, Lowndes and Skaife finished in sixth position with Jason Plato and Yvan Muller. Kelly raced the Holden Young Lions entry at some rounds being joined by Pretty at Bathurst.

Off-track Craig Lowndes wanted out of his ten-year management contract with Tom Walkinshaw and left the team at season's end for Gibson Motorsport.

=== 2001 ===
In 2001, TWR Australia expanded to become a four-car operation with the formation of the two-car K-Mart Racing Team. Because a team could only race three cars under a Racing Entitlement Contract (REC), Romano Racing's REC was leased for the two K-Mart cars with the Romano car entered as a third Holden Racing Team car under the Holden Young Lions banner. Jason Bright joined the team. At the Queensland 500 Skaife and Bright shared a car with Tony Longhurst and Tomas Mezera driving the second. For the Bathurst 1000 the lead drivers were split, Skaife and Longhurst winning. Skaife won the series, Bright finished third.

=== 2002 ===
In 2002 Skaife again won the championship with Bright finishing fourth. HRT won the first eight rounds of the season. Jim Richards and Mezera drove the second car at the Queensland 500. At the Bathurst 1000 Skaife and Richards won with Bright and Mezera third. A third car was raced throughout the season under the Holden Young Lions banner by Rick Kelly, finishing fourth at Bathurst with Nathan Pretty.

=== 2003 ===
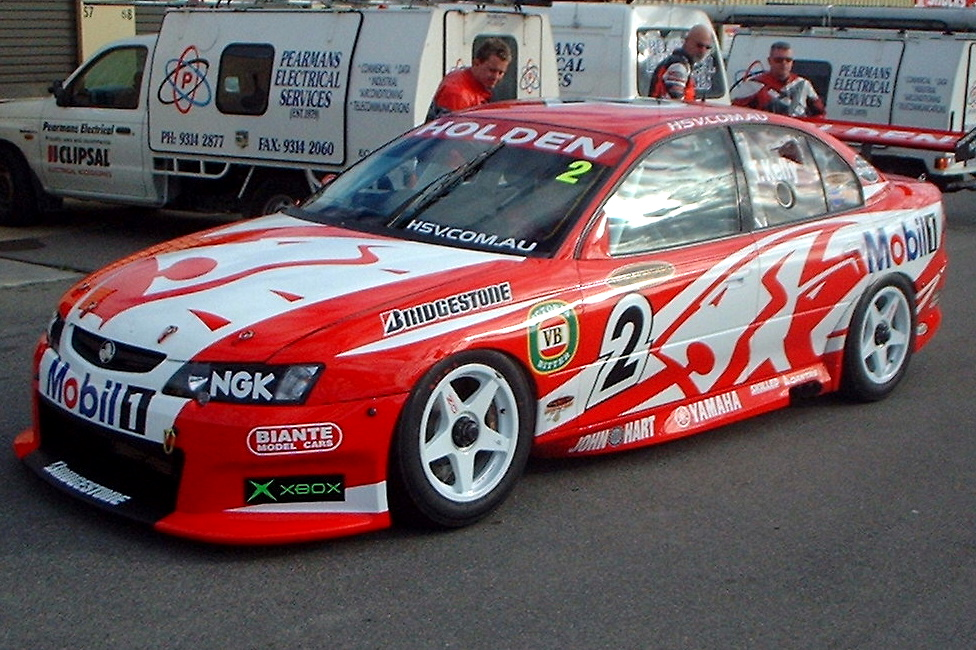
Todd Kelly's VY Commodore at Barbagallo Raceway in 2003

In early 2003 Tom Walkinshaw Racing collapsed and the team was put up for sale by the administrator. Holden purchased the team, but because manufacturers were prohibited from owning teams, it was quickly sold to Mark Skaife. The K-Mart team was purchased by John and Margaret Kelly, continuing to be a customer of HRT until the end of 2008. Paul Weel Racing also became a HRT customer with Jason Bright moving to the team with Todd Kelly commencing a five-year stint as the driver of the second car. For the endurance races Jim Richards and Tony Longhurst rejoined the team. Skaife and Kelly won the Sandown 500 with Longhurst and Richards finishing in tenth. At the Bathurst 1000 Skaife and Kelly finished the race in eighth after being black flagged late in the race to repair accident damage with Richards and Longhurst fifth.

=== 2004 ===
In 2004 Kelly finished the championship in seventh place and Skaife in twelfth after one of his worst seasons on record where it included a number of driver errors and reliability issues. For the endurance events Jason Plato joined Peter Brock in the second car. Skaife and Kelly finished the Bathurst 1000 in fourteenth position, two laps down after a belt from the engine broke early in the race.

=== 2005 ===
In 2005 both Skaife and Kelly won rounds of the championship with Kelly winning the historic V8 Supercars China Round at Shanghai International Circuit. This victory gave HRT its 50th round win, the first team to do so. Skaife and Kelly won the Bathurst 1000. Jim Richards and James Courtney drove the second car, however failed to finish.

=== 2006 ===
In 2006 Kelly finished the season in sixth place and Skaife finished in a miserable sixteenth. Both drivers did have success with Skaife winning at Pukekohe and Wanneroo and Kelly winning at Surfers Paradise and Phillip Island. With HRT out of the title race by the time of the endurance races and the sister HSV Dealer Team having both its drivers in contention, it was controversially decided to split its drivers with Garth Tander driving with Skaife and Kelly with his brother Rick at the HSV Dealer Team. However the plan was not successful with the Skaife/Tander car finishing 26th at the Sandown 500 and crashing on lap 1 at Bathurst after a driveline failure. The second HRT car was driven by Jim Richards and Ryan Briscoe and finished in 21st at Sandown and did not finish at Bathurst.

=== 2007 ===
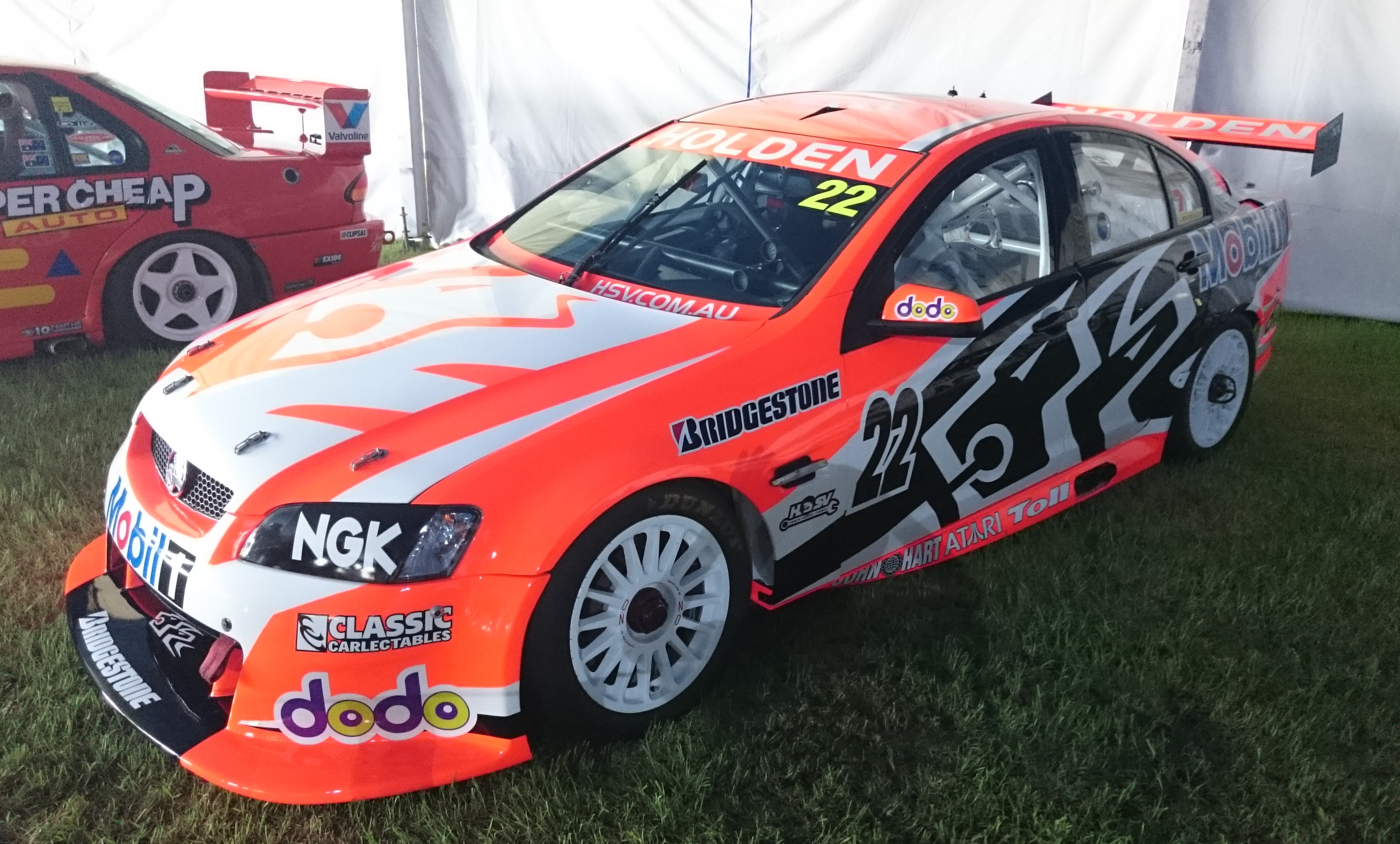
The Holden Commodore VE which was driven by Todd Kelly for the Holden Racing Team in the 2007 V8 Supercar Championship Series. The car is pictured in 2018.

The 2007 V8 Supercar season saw the debut of the new VE Commodore. Skaife finished sixth and Kelly seventh with post scoring race wins. Glenn Seton and Nathan Pretty were signed to drive the second car. However, with Skaife requiring appendix surgery the week before the Sandown 500, a reshuffle saw Kelly and Pretty paired in one car and Seton and Tony Longhurst in the second.

=== 2008 ===
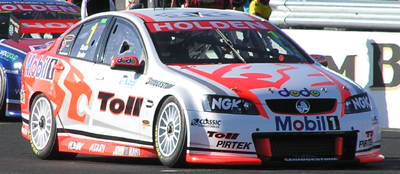
The VE Commodore of Garth Tander and Mark Skaife at the 2008 L&H 500

In 2008 defending champion Garth Tander engineer Matthew Nielson and sponsor Toll transferred from sister team HSV Dealer Team. For the endurance races Glenn Seton was joined by Craig Baird. On 29 October Skaife also announced that 2008 would be his last season in a full-time drive in V8 Supercars. At the end of the year, Skaife sold his 50% share in the team to Tom Walkinshaw.

=== 2009 ===
With John and Margaret Kelly having elected to form their own team and use Perkins Engineering hardware, the team expanded to four cars in 2009, two entered under the HRT banner and two under the Walkinshaw Racing banner. One REC was purchased from WPS Racing and another was acquired from V8 Supercars Australia that had last been used by Romano Racing with Paul Dumbrell moving across with financial support from his family's Autobarn business while David Reynolds joined as the second driver with sponsorship from Bundaberg Red Rum. Dumbrell finished 15th in the championship at seasons end with several top-six finishes while Reynolds finished 22nd, showing pace and promise but no real results.

At HRT, Will Davison took Skaife's seat. Tander and Davison won the Bathurst 1000 with Davison finishing second in the series. HRT did win the team's championship.

== 2010s ==
=== 2010 ===
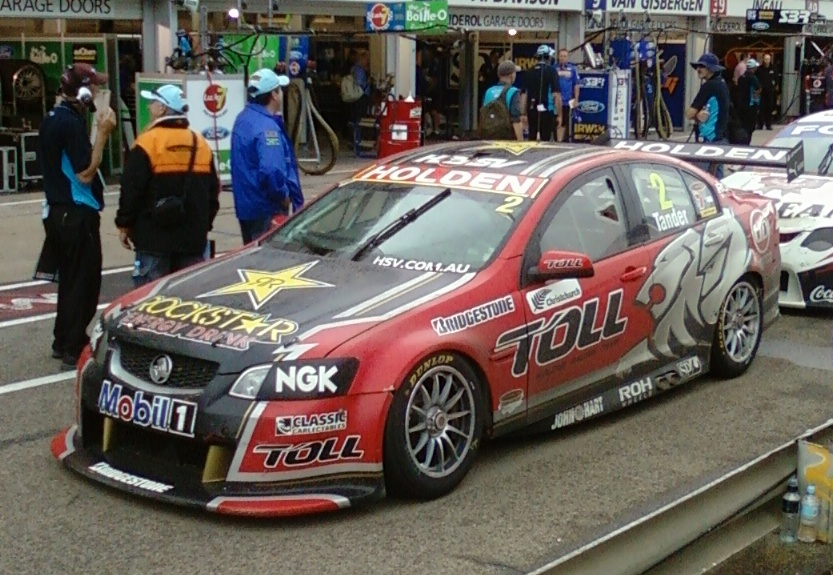
Garth Tander's VE Commodore at the 2011 Clipsal 500 Adelaide.

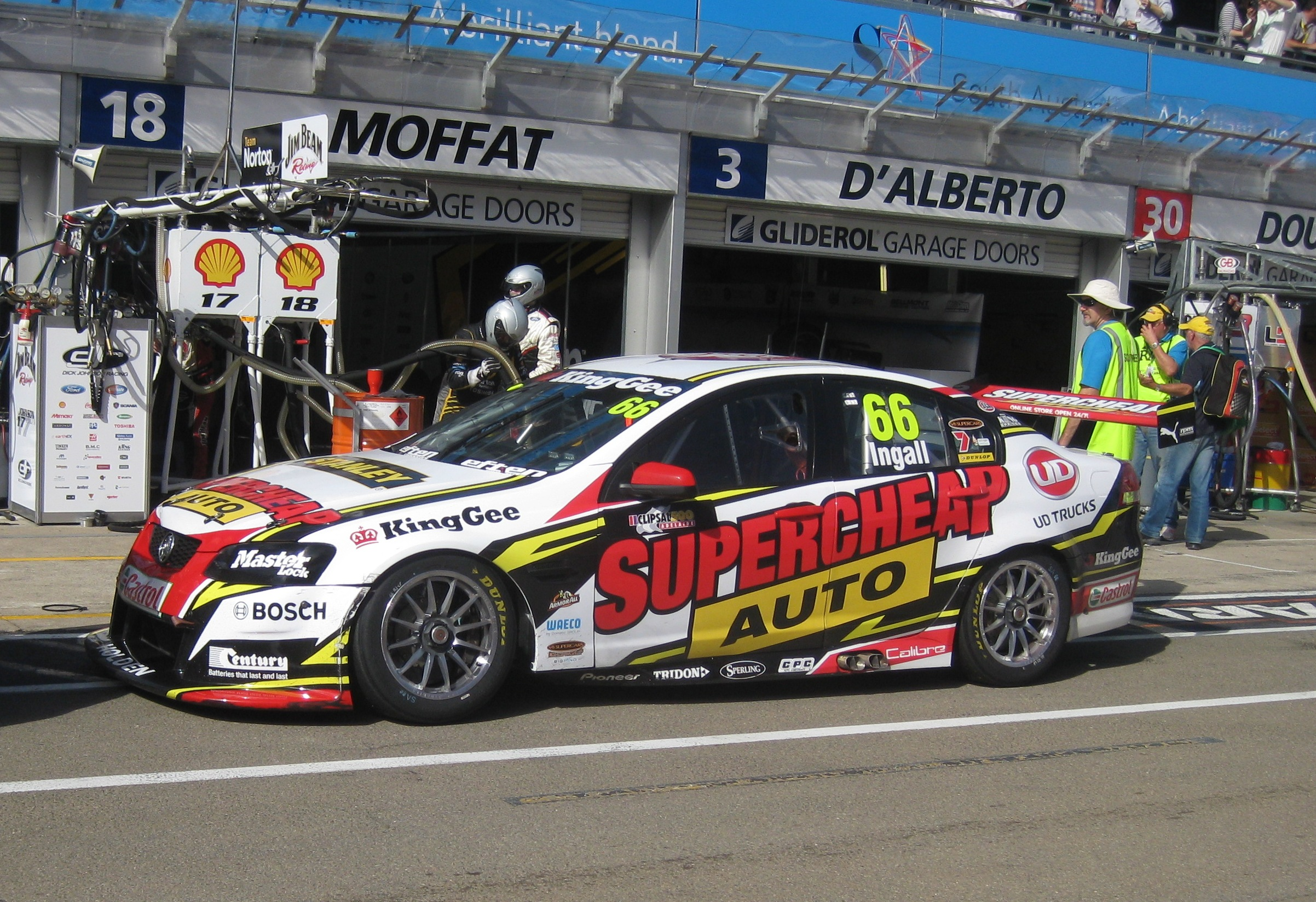
Holden VE Commodore of Russell Ingall at the 2012 Clipsal 500

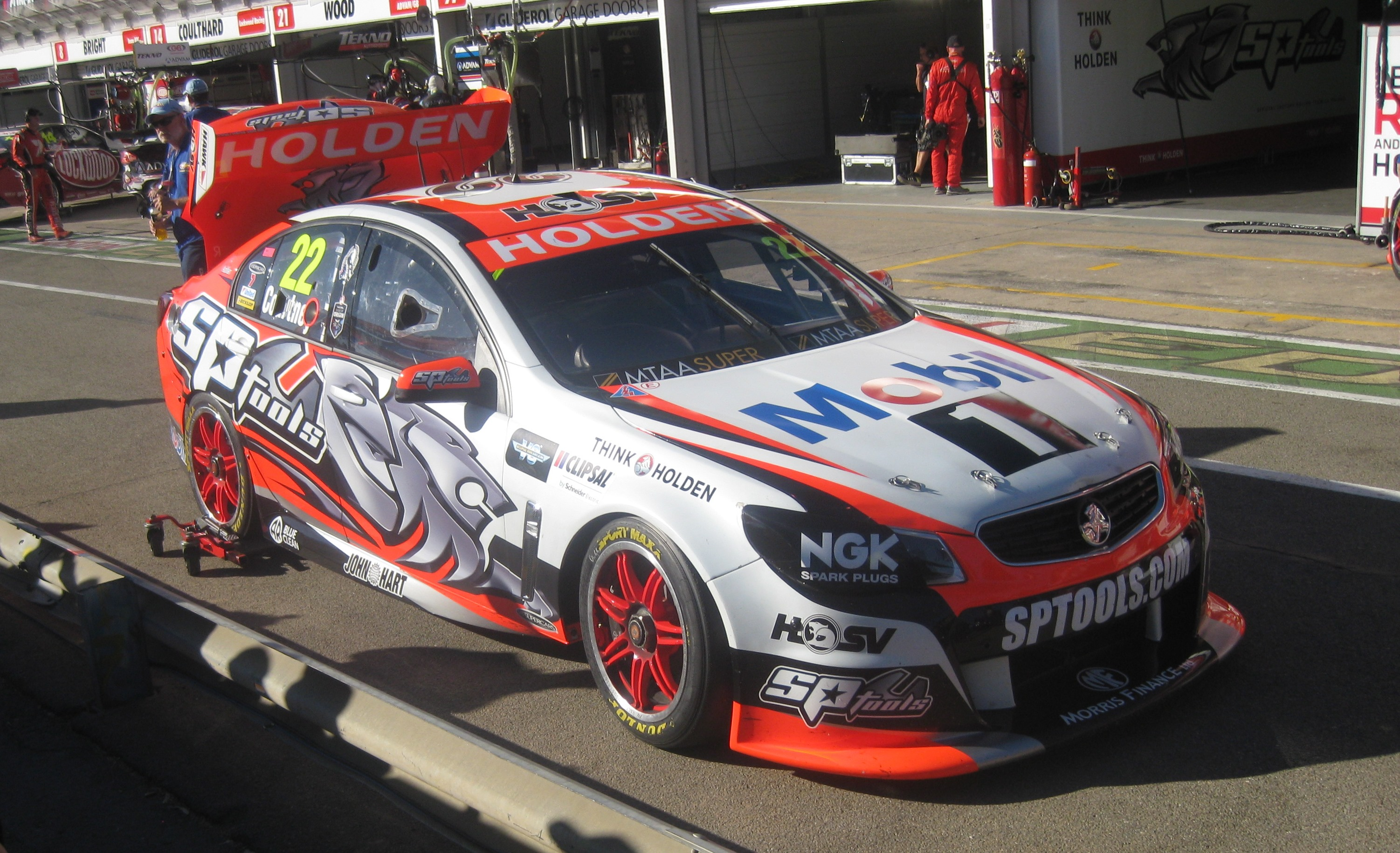
James Courtney's Holden VF Commodore at the 2014 Clipsal 500 Adelaide

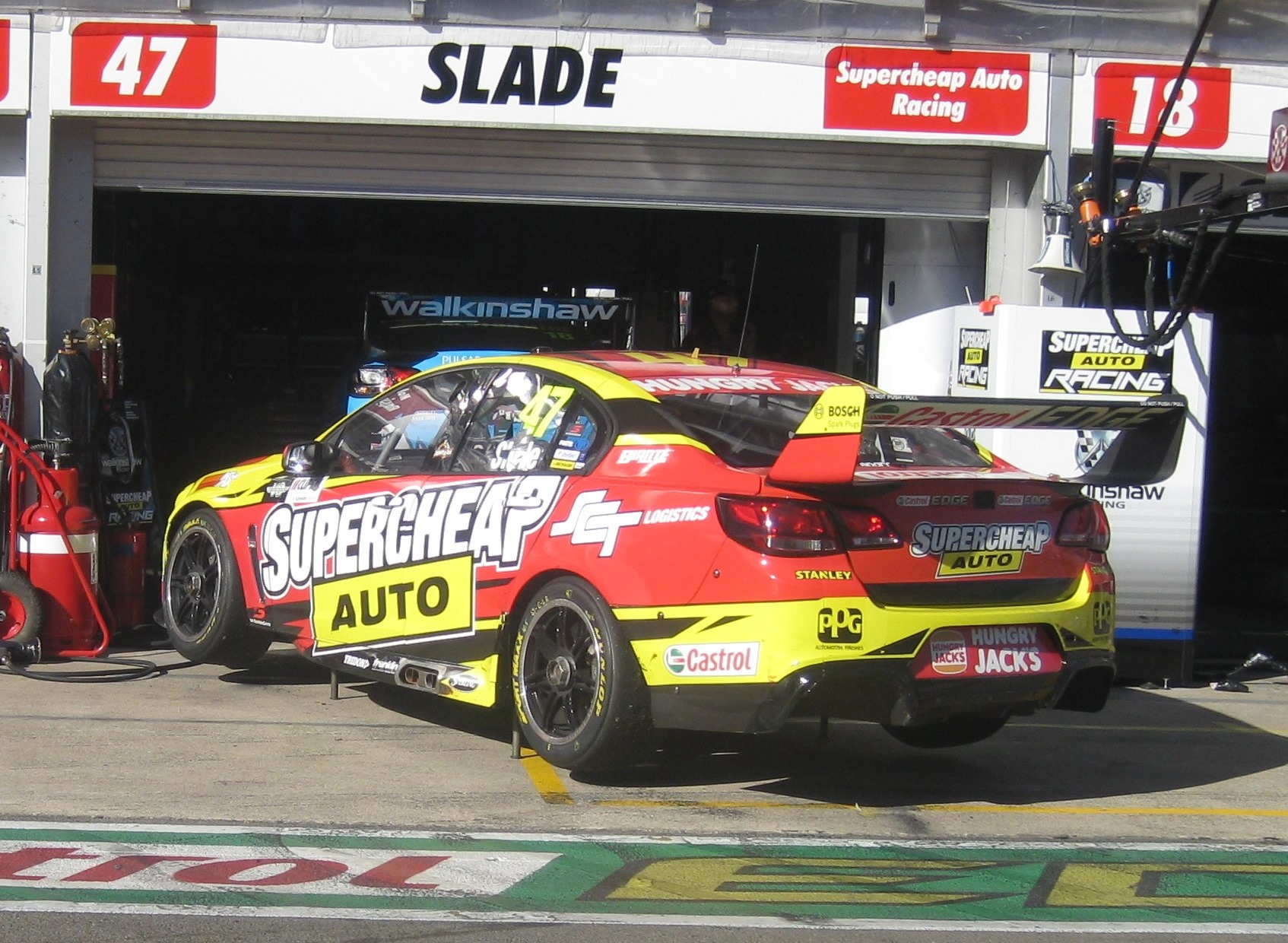
Holden VF Commodore of Tim Slade at the 2015 Clipsal 500 Adelaide

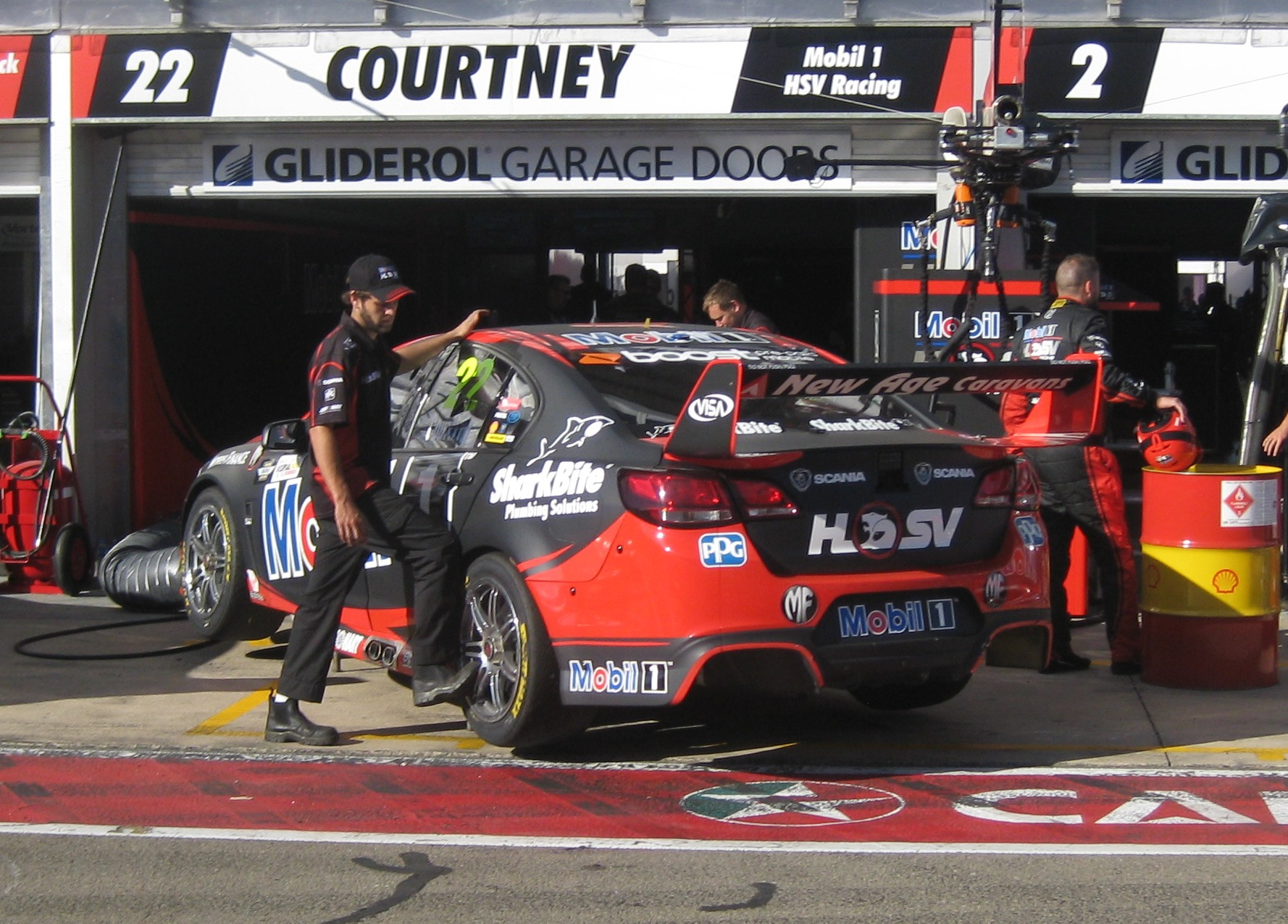
The Holden VF Commodore of James Courtney at the 2017 Clipsal 500 Adelaide

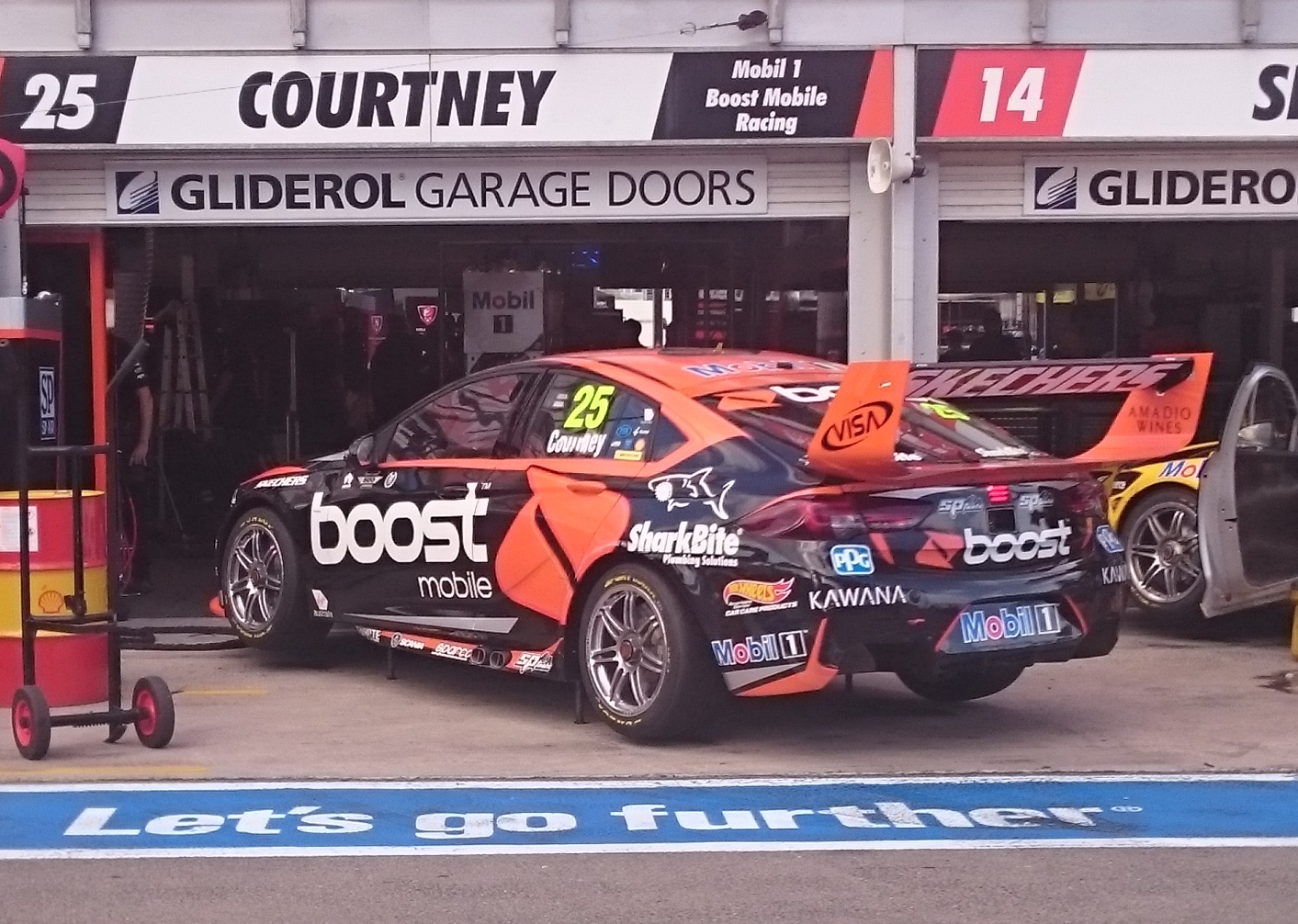
The Holden ZB Commodore of James Courtney at the 2018 Adelaide 500

In 2010, Fabian Coulthard and Andrew Thompson were signed to replace Dumbrell and Reynolds with Bundaberg Red sponsoring both cars.

In 2010 Tander finished fifth and Davison 22nd. As a whole, the team struggled to string together a series and ended a disappointing seventh in the team's championship. For the endurance races Tander was paired with Cameron McConville and Davison with David Reynolds. For the Bathurst 1000 the team ran a retro livery in recognition of the team's 1990 Bathurst victory.

=== 2011 ===
With Will Davison departing for Ford Performance Racing, defending champion James Courtney joined the team. The season started with Courtney winning in Abu Dhabi. For the endurance races, Tander was joined by Nick Percat and Courtney by McConville. Tander and Percat won the Bathurst 1000. Tander finished the season fifth, Courtney tenth.

On the Walkinshaw Racing side, the team downsized to a single car for Coulthard with continued support from Bundaberg Rum, the race number was changed to No. 61.

=== 2012 ===
In 2012 the team scored no wins with Tander finishing the season in seventh, Courtney tenth. Coulthard was replaced by Russell Ingall who brought Supercheap Auto sponsorship, the race number was also changed once again No. 66.

=== 2013 ===
The VF Commodore made its debut in 2013. At the Townsville 400 Tander led a team one-two, breaking a 20-month drought for the team. Tander was again joined by Nick Percat for the endurance events, with Courtney joined by Greg Murphy. Tander also won a race at Phillip Island, James Courtney also won a race at Winton. Ingall and Supercheap Auto remained with the team in 2013.

=== 2014 ===
Tander and Courtney again drove VF Commodores in 2014 with Warren Luff and Greg Murphy driving in the endurance races. Ingall was replaced by Tim Slade and the car entered as No. 47. The team expanded to a four car operation with a customer car fielded for James Rosenberg Racing with Nick Percat driving. Adrian Burgess joined as team manager.

=== 2015 ===
The full-time driver lineup was maintained for 2015. Jack Perkins replaced the retiring Greg Murphy for the endurance races and also substituted for Courtney at a few rounds after the latter was injured. Russell Ingall joined Perkins at the Sandown 500 and Bathurst 1000. With James Rosenberg Racing returning its REC to V8 Supercars at the end of 2014, a customer car was fielded for Team 18 with Lee Holdsworth driving.

=== 2016 ===
With Supercheap Auto taking its sponsorship to Prodrive Racing Australia, the team downsized to two cars, the two Holden Racing Team entries. The third REC was sold to Super Black Racing while Team 18 became a stand-alone team. Tander and Luff won the Sandown 500.

=== 2017 ===
In 2017 the team lost its Holden factory backing to Triple Eight Race Engineering, but continued to field two VF Commodores under the Mobil 1 HSV Racing banner. Scott Pye replaced Tander.

=== 2018 ===
The team was rebranded as Walkinshaw Andretti United in January 2018, with Andretti Autosport and United Autosports becoming 37.5% and 25% shareholders respectively in the team. Walkinshaw and Andretti now hold equal ownership with United Autosports as minority partner. All Holden teams, including Walkinshaw Andretti United, upgraded their entries to the new Holden ZB Commodore for the 2018 season. The team raced under the Mobil 1 Boost Mobile Racing banner, with Courtney's number changed to No. 25, in recognition of the 25th anniversary of the team and Mobil 1's partnership.

Highlights for the team during 2018 were the team scoring one win, courtesy of Scott Pye in challenging conditions at the Melbourne 400. The win was also Pye's first in the category. A second placing at Bathurst for the second year in a row and moving up to 5th in the teams championship.

=== 2019 ===
WAU continued to field two ZB Commodores for Scott Pye and James Courtney, with Courtney reverting to running the teams traditional racing number of 22. Mega Fuels came in as the new main sponsor to the team, replacing Boost Mobile, which went to Garry Rogers Motorsport. They endured a difficult season, with the team only having a single Top 5 result, coming from James Courtney at the first race at Winton Motor Raceway, and finished 6th in the Teams Championship. On 27 August, James Courtney announced that he would leave the team, after nine years with the team. On 3 September, their main sponsor, Mega Fuels, went into receivership, making Mobil 1 their primary sponsor at Pukekohe and Winning Appliances and Appliances Online for #2 and #22 respectively from Bathurst onwards.

== 2020s ==
=== 2020 ===
2019 Super2 Series champion Bryce Fullwood and 2014 Bathurst 1000 winner Chaz Mostert signed with the team for the 2020 season. Mostert started the year well with a podium in his second race at the Adelaide 500.

2020 was a challenging year for the team as they, along with the other teams battled the effects of the COVID-19 pandemic. Many team members had to leave their families in Melbourne to help keep the Supercars season going.

Fullwood claimed his first podium at The Bend Motorsport Park in September. Mostert finished the year strong, combining with the experienced Warren Luff to claim a fine 3rd place at the season ending Bathurst 1000.

=== 2021 ===
Fullwood and Mostert both continued on with the team for 2021. Mostert achieved his first pole position for the team at Sandown and followed it up with a win at the next event at Symmons Plains. Mostert was able to claim another win at Hidden Valley before the series took an extended break due to the various lockdowns caused by the COVID-19 pandemic.

On 26 October, it was announce that Nick Percat would be re-joining the team he made his debut with, replacing Bryce Fullwood who had signed with Brad Jones Racing.

=== 2023 ===
In May 2022, Walkinshaw Andretti United confirmed that the team will switch to Ford machinery from 2023 season onwards and thus received a same treatment as Dick Johnson Racing, Tickford Racing, Grove Racing and Blanchard Racing Team by receiving a full-factory support from Ford. Both Percat and Mostert remained with the team for 2023.

=== 2024 ===
For 2024, Ryan Wood replaced Percat in the teams #2 Mustang, with Mostert remaining in the #25 entry. Mostert won the teams first race with Mustangs in Perth, along with two more wins in Sydney.

=== 2025 ===
Both Wood and Mostert remained with the team for the 2025 Season. Ryan Wood scored his first win in Perth and Chaz Mostert won the 2025 Supercars Championship, taking 4 wins during the season.

=== 2026 ===
For 2026, the team switches to racing Toyota GR Supras Mostert and Wood remained with the team. On 10 April, it was announced both Mostert and Wood had signed multi-year extensions keeping them with Walkinshaw TWG Racing

== Ownership battle ==
At the start of the 2007 season, a battle erupted over the ownership of HRT. Skaife had been hounded by governing body, the Touring Car Entrants Group of Australia (TEGA), for more than four months for paperwork proving compliance with the Teams' Licence Agreement, but had failed to show the required information. He was given until 12 March to provide the evidence, or the team could be removed from the V8 Touring Car Competition.

Skaife managed to produce sufficient evidence and TEGA allowed HRT to continue racing. A commercial settlement was struck between Skaife and TEGA that ensured that Skaife, and not Holden Motor Sport owner Tom Walkinshaw, had ownership and control over the team. It has been revealed that Tom Walkinshaw owned a 50% stake in Skaife Sports. Subsequently, in December 2008 Skaife sold his remaining interest in HRT to Walkinshaw.

== GT racing ==
Since 2016, Walkinshaw Andretti United has entered the Australian GT Championship with a factory backed Porsche 911 GT3 R driven by John Martin and later Liam Talbot. Talbot moved to Porsche Carrera Cup Australia in 2019 and the GT team was shut down.

== Results ==
=== Bathurst 1000 results ===
Year	No.	Car	Drivers	Pos.	Laps
1999	1	Holden Commodore VT	(Australia) Craig Lowndes (Australia) Cameron McConville	2nd	161
1999	2	Holden Commodore VT	(Australia) Mark Skaife (Australia) Paul Morris	3rd	161
2000	1	Holden Commodore VT	(Australia) Craig Lowndes (Australia) Mark Skaife	6th	161
2000	2	Holden Commodore VT	(United Kingdom) Jason Plato (France) Yvan Muller	10th	159
2001	1	Holden Commodore VX	(Australia) Mark Skaife (Australia) Tony Longhurst	1st	161
2001	2	Holden Commodore VX	(Australia) Jason Bright (Australia) Tomas Mezera	Ret	129
2002	1	Holden Commodore VX	(Australia) Mark Skaife (New Zealand) Jim Richards	1st	161
2002	2	Holden Commodore VX	(Australia) Jason Bright (Australia) Tomas Mezera	3rd	161
2003	1	Holden Commodore VY	(Australia) Mark Skaife (Australia) Todd Kelly	8th	161
2003	2	Holden Commodore VY	(New Zealand) Jim Richards (Australia) Tony Longhurst	5th	161
2004	2	Holden Commodore VY	(Australia) Mark Skaife (Australia) Todd Kelly	14th	159
2004	05	Holden Commodore VY	(Australia) Peter Brock (United Kingdom) Jason Plato	Ret	29
2005	2	Holden Commodore VZ	(Australia) Mark Skaife (Australia) Todd Kelly	1st	161
2005	22	Holden Commodore VZ	(New Zealand) Jim Richards (Australia) James Courtney	Ret	7
2006	2	Holden Commodore VZ	(Australia) Mark Skaife (Australia) Garth Tander	Ret	0
2006	22	Holden Commodore VZ	(New Zealand) Jim Richards (Australia) Ryan Briscoe	Ret	24
2007	2	Holden Commodore VE	(Australia) Mark Skaife (Australia) Todd Kelly	Ret	149
2007	22	Holden Commodore VE	(Australia) Glenn Seton (Australia) Nathan Pretty	11th	161
2008	1	Holden Commodore VE	(Australia) Garth Tander (Australia) Mark Skaife	12th	160
2008	2	Holden Commodore VE	(New Zealand) Craig Baird (Australia) Glenn Seton	Ret	146
2009	2	Holden Commodore VE	(Australia) Garth Tander (Australia) Will Davison	1st	161
2009	22	Holden Commodore VE	(Australia) Paul Dumbrell (New Zealand) Craig Baird	21st	153
2010	2	Holden Commodore VE	(Australia) Garth Tander (Australia) Cameron McConville	3rd	161
2010	10	Holden Commodore VE	(Australia) Andrew Thompson (Australia) Ryan Briscoe	25th	154
2010	22	Holden Commodore VE	(Australia) Will Davison (Australia) David Reynolds	Ret	152
2010	24	Holden Commodore VE	(New Zealand) Fabian Coulthard (New Zealand) Craig Baird	Ret	0
2011	1	Holden Commodore VE	(Australia) James Courtney (Australia) Cameron McConville	7th	161
2011	2	Holden Commodore VE	(Australia) Garth Tander (Australia) Nick Percat	1st	161
2011	61	Holden Commodore VE	(New Zealand) Fabian Coulthard (New Zealand) Craig Baird	Ret	13
2012	2	Holden Commodore VE	(Australia) Garth Tander (Australia) Nick Percat	25th	139
2012	22	Holden Commodore VE	(Australia) James Courtney (Australia) Cameron McConville	4th	161
2012	66	Holden Commodore VE	(Australia) Russell Ingall (Austria) Christian Klien	9th	161
2013	2	Holden Commodore VF	(Australia) Garth Tander (Australia) Nick Percat	4th	161
2013	22	Holden Commodore VF	(Australia) James Courtney (New Zealand) Greg Murphy	Ret	85
2013	66	Holden Commodore VF	(Australia) Russell Ingall (Australia) Ryan Briscoe	17th	161
2014	2	Holden Commodore VF	(Australia) Garth Tander (Australia) Warren Luff	DNS	0
2014	10	Holden Commodore VF	(Australia) Tim Slade (Australia) Tony D'Alberto	Ret	102
2014	22	Holden Commodore VF	(Australia) James Courtney (New Zealand) Greg Murphy	13th	160
2015	2	Holden Commodore VF	(Australia) Garth Tander (Australia) Warren Luff	3rd	161
2015	22	Holden Commodore VF	(Australia) Jack Perkins (Australia) Russell Ingall	11th	161
2015	47	Holden Commodore VF	(Australia) Tim Slade (Australia) Tony D'Alberto	14th	161
2016	2	Holden Commodore VF	(Australia) Garth Tander (Australia) Warren Luff	Ret	150
2016	22	Holden Commodore VF	(Australia) James Courtney (Australia) Jack Perkins	13th	161
2017	02	Holden Commodore VF	(Australia) Scott Pye (Australia) Warren Luff	2nd	161
2017	22	Holden Commodore VF	(Australia) James Courtney (Australia) Jack Perkins	19th	147
2018	2	Holden Commodore ZB	(Australia) Scott Pye (Australia) Warren Luff	2nd	161
2018	25	Holden Commodore ZB	(Australia) James Courtney (Australia) Jack Perkins	Ret	33
2019	2	Holden Commodore ZB	(Australia) Scott Pye (Australia) Warren Luff	7th	161
2019	22	Holden Commodore ZB	(Australia) James Courtney (Australia) Jack Perkins	3rd	161
2019	27	Holden Commodore ZB	(United States) Alexander Rossi (Canada) James Hinchcliffe	18th	159
2020	2	Holden Commodore ZB	(Australia) Bryce Fullwood (Australia) Kurt Kostecki	Ret	147
2020	25	Holden Commodore ZB	(Australia) Chaz Mostert (Australia) Warren Luff	3rd	161
2021	2	Holden Commodore ZB	(Australia) Bryce Fullwood (Australia) Warren Luff	5th	161
2021	25	Holden Commodore ZB	(Australia) Chaz Mostert (Australia) Lee Holdsworth	1st	161
2022	2	Holden Commodore ZB	(Australia) Nick Percat (Australia) Warren Luff	22nd	148
2022	25	Holden Commodore ZB	(Australia) Chaz Mostert (New Zealand) Fabian Coulthard	2nd	161
2023	2	Ford Mustang GT	(Australia) Nick Percat (New Zealand) Fabian Coulthard	14th	161
2023	25	Ford Mustang GT	(Australia) Chaz Mostert (Australia) Lee Holdsworth	4th	161
2024	2	Ford Mustang GT	(New Zealand) Ryan Wood (New Zealand) Fabian Coulthard	15th	161
2024	25	Ford Mustang GT	(Australia) Chaz Mostert (Australia) Lee Holdsworth	5th	161
2025	2	Ford Mustang GT	(New Zealand) Ryan Wood (Australia) Jayden Ojeda	19th	149
2025	25	Ford Mustang GT	(Australia) Chaz Mostert (New Zealand) Fabian Coulthard	Ret	57
2026	1	Toyota GR Supra	(Australia) Chaz Mostert (New Zealand) Fabian Coulthard	Ret	155
2026	2	Toyota GR Supra	(New Zealand) Ryan Wood (New Zealand) Jaxon Evans	24th	145

- Wildcard Entries are listed in italics.

== Supercars results ==
=== Car No. 1 results ===
Year	Driver	No.	Make	1	2	3	4	5	6	7	8	9	10	11	12	13	14	15	16	17	18	19	20	21	22	23	24	25	26	27	28	29	30	31	32	33	34	35	36	37	38	39	40	Position	Pts
1996	Craig Lowndes	15	Holden	EAS; R1; 2	EAS; R2; 1	EAS; R3; 1	SAN; R4; 1	SAN; R5; 4	SAN; R6; 3	BAT; R7; 4	BAT; R8; Ret	BAT; R9; 10	SYM; R10; 1	SYM; R11; 1	SYM; R12; 1	PHI; R13; 1	PHI; R14; Ret	PHI; R15; DNS	CAL; R16; 1	CAL; R17; Ret	CAL; R18; 7	LAK; R19; 1	LAK; R20; 1	LAK; R21; 1	BAR; R22; 1	BAR; R23; 1	BAR; R24; 1	MAL; R25; 1	MAL; R26; 1	MAL; R27; 5	ORA; R28; 2	ORA; R29; 2	ORA; R30; Ret											1st	423
1997	Greg Murphy	15	Holden	CAL; R1; 1	CAL; R2; 7	CAL; R3; 7	PHI; R4; 3	PHI; R5; 4	PHI; R6; DNS	SAN; R7; DNS	SAN; R8; 11	SAN; R9; 3	SYM; R10; 2	SYM; R11; 1	SYM; R12; 1	WIN; R13; 6	WIN; R14; Ret	WIN; R15; 6	EAS; R16; DNS	EAS; R17; 7	EAS; R18; Ret	LAK; R19; 6	LAK; R20; 3	LAK; R21; Ret	BAR; R22; 7	BAR; R23; 3	BAR; R24; 1	MAL; R25; 1	MAL; R26; 1	MAL; R27; 2	ORA; R28; 2	ORA; R29; 3	ORA; R30; 2											4th	550
1998	Craig Lowndes	15	Holden	SAN; R1; 2	SAN; R2; 1	SAN; R3; 1	SYM; R4; 3	SYM; R5; 1	SYM; R6; 1	LAK; R7; 6	LAK; R8; 4	LAK; R9; 4	PHI; R10; 2	PHI; R11; 1	PHI; R12; 2	WIN; R13; 4	WIN; R14; 3	WIN; R15; Ret	MAL; R16; 3	MAL; R17; 3	MAL; R18; 1	BAR; R19; 1	BAR; R20; 1	BAR; R21; 1	CAL; R22; 1	CAL; R23; 2	CAL; R24; C	HID; R25; 1	HID; R26; DNS	HID; R27; 6	ORA; R28; 1	ORA; R29; 1	ORA; R30; 1											1st	992
1999	Craig Lowndes	1	Holden	EAS; R1; 3	EAS; R2; 2	EAS; R3; 1	ADE; R4; 1	BAR; R5; 1	BAR; R6; 1	BAR; R7; 1	PHI; R8; 2	PHI; R9; 2	PHI; R10; 1	HID; R11; 3	HID; R12; 3	HID; R13; Ret	SAN; R14; 2	SAN; R15; 2	SAN; R16; 1	QLD; R17; 3	QLD; R18; 1	QLD; R19; 5	CAL; R20; 1	CAL; R21; Ret	CAL; R22; DNS	SYM; R23	SYM; R24	SYM; R25	WIN; R26; 16	WIN; R27; 7	WIN; R28; 5	ORA; R29; 2	ORA; R30; 2	ORA; R31; 2	QLD; R32; 3	BAT; R33; 2								1st	1918
2000	Craig Lowndes	1	Holden	PHI; R1; 1	PHI; R2; Ret	BAR; R3; 1	BAR; R4; 1	BAR; R5; 1	ADE; R6; 1	ADE; R7; Ret	EAS; R8; 2	EAS; R9; 3	EAS; R10; 18	HID; R11; 2	HID; R12; 22	HID; R13; Ret	CAN; R14; 13	CAN; R15; 10	CAN; R16; 1	QLD; R17; 1	QLD; R18; 1	QLD; R19; 1	WIN; R20; 4	WIN; R21; 5	WIN; R22; 17	ORA; R23; 2	ORA; R24; Ret	ORA; R25; 9	CAL; R26; 3	CAL; R27; 4	CAL; R28; 7	QLD; R29; 1	SAN; R30; 2	SAN; R31; 4	SAN; R32; 4	BAT; R33; 6								3rd	1310
2001	Mark Skaife	1	Holden	PHI; R1; 1	PHI; R2; 1	ADE; R3; 4	ADE; R4; 9	EAS; R5; 2	EAS; R6; 1	HDV; R7; 14	HDV; R8; 3	HDV; R9; 1	CAN; R10; 3	CAN; R11; 24	CAN; R12; 1	BAR; R13; 2	BAR; R14; 2	BAR; R15; 2	CAL; R16; 25	CAL; R17; 11	CAL; R18; 18	ORA; R19; 1	ORA; R20; 1	QLD; R21; 4	WIN; R22; 3	WIN; R23; 2	BAT; R24; 1	PUK; R25; 3	PUK; R26; 2	PUK; R27; 3	SAN; R28; 1	SAN; R29; 4	SAN; R30; Ret											1st	3478
2002	Mark Skaife	1	Holden	ADE; R1; 1	ADE; R2; 1	PHI; R3; 2	PHI; R4; 1	EAS; R5; 1	EAS; R6; 1	EAS; R7; 1	HDV; R8; 2	HDV; R9; 1	HDV; R10; 1	CAN; R11; 1	CAN; R12; 13	CAN; R13; 1	BAR; R14; 1	BAR; R15; Ret	BAR; R16; 7	ORA; R17; 1	ORA; R18; 1	WIN; R19; 4	WIN; R20; 9	QLD; R21; Ret	BAT; R22; 1	SUR; R23; 24	SUR; R24; Ret	PUK; R25; 1	PUK; R26; Ret	PUK; R27; Ret	SAN; R28; 5	SAN; R29; 2												1st	2227
2003	Mark Skaife	1	Holden	ADE; R1; 2	ADE; R1; 1	PHI; R3; 6	EAS; R4; 19	WIN; R5; 6	BAR; R6; 2	BAR; R7; 1	BAR; R8; 23	HDV; R9; 1	HDV; R10; 2	HDV; R11; 3	QLD; R12; Ret	ORA; R13; 3	SAN; R14; 1	BAT; R15; 8	SUR; R16; 3	SUR; R17; 3	PUK; R18; 7	PUK; R19; 2	PUK; R20; 1	EAS; R21; 7	EAS; R22; Ret																			3rd	1817
2008	Garth Tander	1	Holden	ADE; R1; 23	ADE; R2; 19	EAS; R3; 1	EAS; R4; 9	EAS; R5; 3	HAM; R6; 1	HAM; R7; 1	HAM; R8; 1	BAR; R29; 3	BAR; R10; 2	BAR; R11; 2	SAN; R12; 5	SAN; R13; 9	SAN; R14; 12	HDV; R15; 3	HDV; R16; 1	HDV; R17; 3	QLD; R18; 4	QLD; R19; 4	QLD; R20; 4	WIN; R21; 3	WIN; R22; 3	WIN; R23; 1	PHI; QR; 7	PHI; R24; 1	BAT; R25; 12	SUR; R26; 2	SUR; R27; 2	SUR; R28; 2	BHR; R29; 14	BHR; R30; 11	BHR; R31; 23	SYM; R32; 20	SYM; R33; 8	SYM; R34; 5	ORA; R35; 6	ORA; R36; 1	ORA; R37; 2			3rd	3048
2009	Will Davison	22	Holden	ADE; R1; 3	ADE; R2; 2	HAM; R3; 4	HAM; R4; 7	WIN; R5; 7	WIN; R6; 5	SYM; R7; 4	SYM; R8; 2	HDV; R9; 3	HDV; R10; 18	TOW; R11; 2	TOW; R12; 4	SAN; R13; 1	SAN; R14; 2	QLD; R15; Ret	QLD; R16; 1	PHI; Q 3	PHI; R17; 1	BAT; R18; 1	SUR; R19; 3	SUR; R20; 3	SUR; R21; 21	SUR; R22; 10	PHI; R23; 2	PHI; R24; 11	BAR; R25; 5	BAR; R26; Ret	SYD; R27; 15	SYD; R28; 8												2nd	3044
2010	Will Davison	22	Holden	YMC; R1; Ret	YMC; R2; 14	BHR; R3; 8	BHR; R4; 6	ADE; R5; 9	ADE; R6; 14	HAM; R7; Ret	HAM; R8; 5	QLD; R9; 15	QLD; R10; 16	WIN; R11; 22	WIN; R12; 18	HDV; R13; Ret	HDV; R14; 11	TOW; R15; 18	TOW; R16; 6	PHI; Q 6	PHI; R17; 28	BAT; R18; Ret	SUR; R19; Ret	SUR; R20; 7	SYM; R21; 22	SYM; R22; Ret	SAN; R23; 10	SAN; R24; Ret	SYD; R25; Ret	SYD; R26; Ret														22nd	1236
2011	James Courtney	1	Holden	YMC; R1; 26	YMC; R2; 1	ADE; R3; 24	ADE; R4; 4	HAM; R5; 11	HAM; R6; Ret	BAR; R7; 10	BAR; R8; 26	BAR; R9; 5	WIN; R10; 8	WIN; R11; 25	HID; R12; 25	HID; R13; 24	TOW; R14; Ret	TOW; R15; 19	QLD; R16; 20	QLD; R17; Ret	QLD; R18; 12	PHI; Q 12	PHI; R19; 9	BAT; R20; 7	SUR; R21; 14	SUR; R22; 6	SYM; R23; 10	SYM; R24; 11	SAN; R25; 2	SAN; R26; 11	SYD; R27; 7	SYD; R28; 7												10th	1869
2012	James Courtney	22	Holden	ADE; R1; Ret	ADE; R2; 25	SYM; R3; 18	SYM; R4; 8	HAM; R5; 7	HAM; R6; 22	BAR; R7; 5	BAR; R8; 13	BAR; R9; 12	PHI; R10; 18	PHI; R11; 13	HID; R12; 12	HID; R13; 11	TOW; R14; 10	TOW; R15; 15	QLD; R16; 15	QLD; R17; 14	SMP; R18; 6	SMP; R19; 10	SAN; Q 8	SAN; R20; 9	BAT; R21; 4	SUR; R22; 7	SUR; R23; 17	YMC; R24; Ret	YMC; R25; 14	YMC; R26; 13	WIN; R27; 24	WIN; R28; 18	SYD; R29; 3	SYD; R30; 3										10th	2153
2013	James Courtney	22	Holden	ADE; R1; 5	ADE; R2; 7	SYM; R3; 9	SYM; R4; 7	SYM; R5; 3	PUK; R6; 9	PUK; R7; Ret	PUK; R8; 22	PUK; R9; 6	BAR; R10; 8	BAR; R11; 6	BAR; R12; 17	COA; R13; 9	COA; R14; 14	COA; R15; 10	COA; R16; 10	HID; R17; 3	HID; R18; 2	HID; R19; Ret	TOW; R20; 6	TOW; R21; 2	QLD; R22; 5	QLD; R23; 3	QLD; R24; 23	WIN; R25; 5	WIN; R26; 3	WIN; R27; 1	SAN; QR; 7	SAN; R28; 5	BAT; R29; Ret	SUR; R30; Ret	SUR; R31; Ret	PHI; R32; Ret	PHI; R33; DNS	PHI; R34; DNS	SYD; R35	SYD; R36				11th	1909
2014	James Courtney	22	Holden	ADE; R1; 9	ADE; R2; 18	ADE; R3; 1	SYM; R4; 2	SYM; R5; 10	SYM; R6; 3	WIN; R7; Ret	WIN; R8; 9	WIN; R9; 2	PUK; R10; 4	PUK; R11; 2	PUK; R12; 12	PUK; R13; 14	BAR; R14; 9	BAR; R15; 8	BAR; R16; 15	HID; R17; 8	HID; R18; 11	HID; R19; 5	TOW; R20; 8	TOW; R21; 2	TOW; R22; 4	QLD; R23; 5	QLD; R24; 10	QLD; R25; 1	SMP; R26; 8	SMP; R27; 8	SMP; R28; Ret	SAN; QR; 6	SAN; R29; 2	BAT; R30; 13	SUR; R31; Ret	SUR; R32; 21	PHI; R33; 13	PHI; R34; 13	PHI; R35; 12	SYD; R36; 11	SYD; R37; 6	SYD; R38; 3		6th	2489
2015	James Courtney	22	Holden	ADE; R1; 10	ADE; R2; 2	ADE; R3; 1	SYM; R4; 3	SYM; R5; 3	SYM; R6; 10	BAR; R7; 10	BAR; R8; 6	BAR; R9; 5	WIN; R10; 14	WIN; R11; 23	WIN; R12; 7	HID; R13; 23	HID; R14; 6	HID; R15; 7	TOW; R16; 6	TOW; R17; 2	QLD; R18; 6	QLD; R19; 8	QLD; R20; 6	SMP; R21	SMP; R22	SMP; R23	SAN; R24	BAT; R25	SUR; R26; 5	SUR; R27; 1	PUK; R28; 8	PUK; R29; 6	PUK; R30; 15	PHI; R31; 6	PHI; R32; 10	PHI; R33; 13	SYD; R34; 4	SYD; R35; 4	SYD; R36; 12					10th	2110
2016	James Courtney	22	Holden	ADE; R1; 2	ADE; R2; 1	ADE; R3; 21	SYM; R4; 13	SYM; R5; 7	PHI; R6; 21	PHI; R7; 7	BAR; R8; 6	BAR; R9; 8	WIN; R10; 19	WIN; R11; 25	HID; R12; 21	HID; R13; 5	TOW; R14; 6	TOW; R15; 2	QLD; R16; 13	QLD; R17; Ret	SMP; R18; 3	SMP; R19; 8	SAN; QR; 6	SAN; R20; 11	BAT; R21; 13	SUR; R22; 20	SUR; R23; 10	PUK; R24; 6	PUK; R25; 13	PUK; R26; 11	PUK; R27; 14	SYD; R28; 5	SYD; R29; 6											11th	2162
2017	James Courtney	22	Holden	ADE; R1; 3	ADE; R2; 4	SYM; R3; Ret	SYM; R4; DNS	PHI; R5; 21	PHI; R6; 20	BAR; R7; 17	BAR; R8; 22	WIN; R9; Ret	WIN; R10; 19	HID; R11; 22	HID; R12; 18	TOW; R13; 25	TOW; R14; 9	QLD; R15; 14	QLD; R16; 23	SMP; R17; 14	SMP; R18; 16	SAN; QR; 14	SAN; R19; 10	BAT; R20; 19	SUR; R21; 14	SUR; R22; 6	PUK; R23; 25	PUK; R24; Ret	NEW; R25; 19	NEW; R26; 24														21st	1431
2018	James Courtney	25	Holden	ADE; R1; 2	ADE; R2; 6	MEL; R3; 12	MEL; R4; 20	MEL; R5; 5	MEL; R6; Ret	SYM; R7; 3	SYM; R8; 4	PHI; R9; 17	PHI; R10; Ret	BAR; R11; 13	BAR; R12; 4	WIN; R13; 9	WIN; R14; 19	HID; R15; 23	HID; R16; 11	TOW; R17; 17	TOW; R18; 10	QLD; R19; 8	QLD; R20; Ret	SMP; R21; Ret	BEN; R22; 8	BEN; R23; 13	SAN; QR; 26	SAN; R24; 16	BAT; R25; Ret	SUR; R26; 3	SUR; R27; C	PUK; R28; 9	PUK; R29; 16	NEW; R30; 7	NEW; R31; 5									14th	2073
2019	James Courtney	22	Holden	ADE; R1; 10	ADE; R2; 12	MEL; R3; 7	MEL; R4; 9	MEL; R5; 7	MEL; R6; 16	SYM; R7; 5	SYM; R8; 13	PHI; R9; 22	PHI; R10; 24	BAR; R11; 25	BAR; R12; 16	WIN; R13; 4	WIN; R14; 13	HID; R15; 9	HID; R16; 14	TOW; R17; 13	TOW; R18; 13	QLD; R19; 11	QLD; R20; 12	BEN; R21; 10	BEN; R22; 15	PUK; R23; 17	PUK; R24; 17	BAT; R25; 3	SUR; R26; 12	SUR; R27; 9	SAN; QR; 10	SAN; R28; 7	NEW; R29; 7	NEW; R30; 11										11th	2275
2020	Chaz Mostert	25	Holden	ADE; R1; 7	ADE; R2; 2	MEL; R3; C	MEL; R4; C	MEL; R5; C	MEL; R6; C	SMP1; R7; 4	SMP1; R8; 4	SMP1; R9; 16	SMP2; R10; 11	SMP2; R11; 5	SMP2; R12; 9	HID1; R13; 7	HID1; R14; 8	HID1; R15; 4	HID2; R16; 9	HID2; R17; 18	HID2; R18; 6	TOW1; R19; 3	TOW1; R20; 2	TOW1; R21; 24	TOW2; R22; 3	TOW2; R23; 10	TOW2; R24; 4	BEN1; R25; 11	BEN1; R26; 11	BEN1; R27; 16	BEN2; R28; 11	BEN2; R29; 8	BEN2; R30; 6	BAT; R31; 3										5th	1958
2021	Chaz Mostert	25	Holden	BAT; R1; 2	BAT; R2; 3	SAN; R3; 6	SAN; R4; 4	SAN; R5; 24	SYM; R6; 4	SYM; R7; 6	SYM; R8; 1	BEN; R9; 2	BEN; R10; Ret	BEN; R11; 5	HID; R12; 1	HID; R13; 4	HID; R14; 4	TOW; R15; 14	TOW; R16; 9	TOW2; R17; 3	TOW2; R18; 3	TOW2; R19; 9	SYD1; R20; 6	SYD1; R21; 7	SYD1; R22; 7	SYD2; R23; 14	SYD2; R24; 8	SYD2; R25; 3	SYD3; R26; 11	SYD3; R27; 4	SYD3; R28; 8	SYD4; R29; 5	SYD4; R30; C	BAT; R31; 1										3rd	2494
2022	Chaz Mostert	25	Holden	SMP; R1; 3	SMP; R2; 1	SYM; R3; 23	SYM; R4; 4	SYM; R5; 18	MEL; R6; 1	MEL; R7; 22	MEL; R8; 5	MEL; R9; 1	BAR; R10; 22	BAR; R11; 12	BAR; R12; 19	WIN; R13; 4	WIN; R14; 5	WIN; R15; 11	HID; R16; DSQ	HID; R17; 8	HID; R18; 1	TOW; R19; 9	TOW; R20; 5	BEN; R21; 3	BEN; R22; 2	BEN; R23; 8	SAN; R24; 10	SAN; R25; 2	SAN; R26; 4	PUK; R27; 4	PUK; R28; 2	PUK; R29; 6	BAT; R30; 2	SUR; R31; 3	SUR; R32; 2	ADE; R33; 1	ADE; R34; 2							3rd	2835
2023	Chaz Mostert	25	Ford	NEW; R1; 2	NEW; R2; 2	MEL; R3; 5	MEL; R4; 5	MEL; R5; 4	MEL; R6; 14	BAR; R7; 11	BAR; R8; 4	BAR; R9; 5	SYM; R10; Ret	SYM; R11; 6	SYM; R12; 6	HID; R13; 8	HID; R14; 13	HID; R15; 9	TOW; R16; 3	TOW; R17; Ret	SMP; R18; 2	SMP; R19; 7	BEN; R20; 2	BEN; R21; 3	BEN; R22; 9	SAN; R23; 22	BAT; R24; 4	SUR; R25; 8	SUR; R26; 13	ADE; R27; 4	ADE; R28; 5													4th	2287
2024	Chaz Mostert	25	Ford	BAT1; R1; 3	BAT1; R2; 2	MEL; R3; 4	MEL; R4; 17	MEL; R5; 3	MEL; R6; 5	TAU; R7; 22	TAU; R8; 7	BAR; R9; 1	BAR; R10; 2	HID; R11; 5	HID; R12; 16	TOW; R13; 2	TOW; R14; 3	SMP; R15; 1	SMP; R16; 1	SYM; R17; 2	SYM; R18; 4	SAN; R19; 7	BAT; R20; 5	SUR; R21; 10	SUR; R22; 11	ADE; R23; 13	ADE; R24; 2																	3rd	2667
2025	Chaz Mostert	25	Ford	SYD; R1; 2	SYD; R2; 4	SYD; R3; 3	MEL; R4; 10	MEL; R5; 10	MEL; R6; 22	MEL; R7; C	TAU; R8; 13	TAU; R9; 1	TAU; R10; 3	SYM; R11; 14	SYM; R12; 19	SYM; R13; 18	BAR; R14; 3	BAR; R15; 3	BAR; R16; 6	HID; R17; 6	HID; R18; 17	HID; R19; 12	TOW; R20; 6	TOW; R21; 2	TOW; R22; 3	QLD; R23; 25	QLD; R24; 7	QLD; R25; 6	BEN; R26; 8	BAT; R27; Ret	SUR; R28; 1	SUR; R29; 1	SAN; R30; 1	SAN; R31; 4	ADE; R32; 2	ADE; R33; 2	ADE; R34; 2							1st	5306
2026	Chaz Mostert	1	Toyota	SYD; R1	SYD; R2	SYD; R3	MEL; R4	MEL; R5	MEL; R6	MEL; R7	TAU; R8	TAU; R9	TAU; R10	CHR; R11	CHR; R12	CHR; R13	SYM; R14	SYM; R15	SYM; R16	BAR; R17	BAR; R18	BAR; R19	HID; R20	HID; R21	HID; R22	TOW; R23	TOW; R24	TOW; R25	QLD; R26	QLD; R27	QLD; R28	BEN; R28	BAT; R30	SUR; R31	SUR; R32	SAN; R33	SAN; R34	ADE; R35	ADE; R36	ADE; R37				–	–

=== Car No. 2 results ===
Year	Driver	No.	Make	1	2	3	4	5	6	7	8	9	10	11	12	13	14	15	16	17	18	19	20	21	22	23	24	25	26	27	28	29	30	31	32	33	34	35	36	37	38	39	40	Position	Pts
1990	Win Percy	16	Holden	AMA; R1; 14	SYM; R2; 9	PHI; R3; 7	WIN; R4; Ret	LAK; R5; 3	MAL; R6	BAR; R7; 5	ORA; R8; 6																																	8th	32
1990	Neil Crompton	16	Holden	AMA; R1	SYM; R2	PHI; R3	WIN; R4	LAK; R5	MAL; R6; 6	BAR; R7	ORA; R8																																	15th	6
1991	Win Percy	16	Holden	SAN; R1; 5	SYM; R2; Ret	WAN; R3; Ret	LAK; R4; 11	WIN; R5; 6	AMA; R6; 8	MAL; R7; 4	LAK; R8	ORA; R8; 8																																8th	30
1991	Allan Grice	16	Holden	SAN; R1	SYM; R2	WAN; R3	LAK; R4	WIN; R5	AMA; R6	MAL; R7	LAK; R8; 8	ORA; R9																																15th	3
1992	Tomas Mezera	61	Holden	AMA; R1	AMA; R2	SAN; R3; 6	SAN; R4; Ret	SYM; R5	SYM; R6	WIN; R7	WIN; R8	LAK; R9; 12	LAK; R10; 10	EAS; R11; 14	EAS; R12; 13	MAL; R13	MAL; R14	BAR; R15	BAR; R16	ORA; R17	ORA; R18																							16th	29
2003	Todd Kelly	2	Holden	ADE; R1; 5	ADE; R1; 5	PHI; R3; 5	EAS; R4; Ret	WIN; R5; DSQ	BAR; R6; 7	BAR; R7; 7	BAR; R8; 2	HDV; R9; 7	HDV; R10; 24	HDV; R11; Ret	QLD; R12; 3	ORA; R13; 6	SAN; R14; 1	BAT; R15; 8	SUR; R16; 10	SUR; R17; Ret	PUK; R18; 2	PUK; R19; 4	PUK; R20; 4	EAS; R21; 3	EAS; R22; Ret																			9th	1628
2004	Mark Skaife	2	Holden	ADE; R1; 7	ADE; R2; 17	EAS; R3; 22	PUK; R4; 16	PUK; R5; Ret	PUK; R6; 19	HDV; R7; 14	HDV; R8; 9	HDV; R9; 7	BAR; R10; 1	BAR; R11; 15	BAR; R12; 9	QLD; R13; Ret	WIN; R14; 28	ORA; R15; 1	ORA; R16; 2	SAN; R17; 23	BAT; R18; 14	SUR; R19; 24	SUR; R20; 13	SYM; R21; Ret	SYM; R22; Ret	SYM; R23; 3	EAS; R24; 18	EAS; R25; 7	EAS; R26; 2															12th	1294
2005	Mark Skaife	2	Holden	ADE; R1; Ret	ADE; R2; 3	PUK; R3; 3	PUK; R4; 4	PUK; R5; 5	BAR; R6; 1	BAR; R7; 29	BAR; R8; 6	EAS; R9; 7	EAS; R10; 7	SHA; R11; 3	SHA; R12; 1	SHA; R13; 23	HDV; R14; 2	HDV; R15; 2	HDV; R16; 26	QLD; R17; 12	ORA; R18; 16	ORA; R19; 30	SAN; R20; 2	BAT; R21; 1	SUR; R22; 3	SUR; R23; 3	SUR; R24; 2	SYM; R25; 25	SYM; R26; 12	SYM; R27; 9	PHI; R28; 15	PHI; R29; 10	PHI; R30; 8											5th	1754
2006	Mark Skaife	2	Holden	ADE; R1; Ret	ADE; R2; Ret	PUK; R3; 1	PUK; R4; 5	PUK; R5; 1	BAR; R6; 1	BAR; R7; 18	BAR; R8; 1	WIN; R9; 5	WIN; R10; 17	WIN; R11; 3	HDV; R12; 1	HDV; R13; 28	HDV; R14; 6	QLD; R15; 21	QLD; R16; 1	QLD; R17; 27	ORA; R18; Ret	ORA; R19; 1	ORA; R20; 23	SAN; R21; 26	BAT; R22; Ret	SUR; R23; 25	SUR; R24; 21	SUR; R25; Ret	SYM; R26; 16	SYM; R27; Ret	SYM; R28; Ret	BHR; R29; 7	BHR; R30; 19	BHR; R31; 4	PHI; R32; 3	PHI; R33; 6	PHI; R34; 11							16th	2036
2007	Mark Skaife	2	Holden	ADE; R1; 14	ADE; R2; 7	BAR; R3; 3	BAR; R4; 3	BAR; R5; 2	PUK; R6; 10	PUK; R7; 6	PUK; R8; 9	WIN; R9; 21	WIN; R10; 17	WIN; R11; 26	EAS; R12; 1	EAS; R13; 1	EAS; R14; 3	HDV; R15; 1	HDV; R16; 5	HDV; R17; 5	QLD; R18; 2	QLD; R19; 8	QLD; R20; 17	ORA; R21; 1	ORA; R22; 20	'ORA; R23; Ret	SAN; R24	BAT; R25; Ret	SUR; R26; 17	SUR; R27; 8	SUR; R28; Ret	BHR; R29; 7	BHR; R30; 18	BHR; R31; 21	SYM; R32; 7	SYM; R33; 4	SYM; R34; 4	PHI; R35; 2	PHI; R36; 5	PHI; R37; 7				8th	379
2008	Mark Skaife	2	Holden	ADE; R1; 9	ADE; R2; 17	EAS; R3; 6	EAS; R4; 14	EAS; R5; 5	HAM; R6; 18	HAM; R7; 23	HAM; R8; 12	BAR; R9; 2	BAR; R10; Ret	BAR; R11; DNS	SAN; R12; 10	SAN; R13; 18	SAN; R14; 22	HDV; R15; 25	HDV; R16; 8	HDV; R17; 18	QLD; R18; 5	QLD; R19; 10	QLD; R20; 9	WIN; R21; 12	WIN; R22; Ret	WIN; R23; DNS	PHI; Q 15	PHI; R24; 1	BAT; R25; 12	SUR; R26; 16	SUR; R27; 16	SUR; R28; 14	BHR; R29; Ret	BHR; R30; 17	BHR; R31; Ret	SYM; R32; 25	SYM; R33; 24	SYM; R34; 15	ORA; R35; Ret	ORA; R36; Ret	ORA; R37; 12			14th	1644
2009	Garth Tander	2	Holden	ADE; R1; Ret	ADE; R2; 3	HAM; R3; 11	HAM; R4; 9	WIN; R5; 8	WIN; R6; 3	SYM; R7; 1	SYM; R8; 12	HDV; R9; 4	HDV; R10; 5	TOW; R11; 3	TOW; R12; 3	SAN; R13; 17	SAN; R14; 1	QLD; R15; Ret	QLD; R16; 14	PHI; QR; 19	PHI; R17; 1	BAT; R18; 1	SUR; R19; 2	SUR; R20; 1	SUR; R21; 3	SUR; R22; 2	PHI; R23; 4	PHI; R24; 3	BAR; R25; 11	BAR; R26; 3	SYD; R27; 1	SYD; R28; Ret												3rd	2916
2010	Garth Tander	2	Holden	YMC; R1; 26	YMC; R2; Ret	BHR; R3; 4	BHR; R4; Ret	ADE; R5; 1	ADE; R6; 1	HAM; R7; 2	HAM; R8; 2	QLD; R9; 5	QLD; R10; 2	WIN; R11; 17	WIN; R12; 8	HDV; R13; 10	HDV; R14; 19	TOW; R15; 2	TOW; R16; 3	PHI; QR; 4	PHI; R17; 9	BAT; R18; 3	SUR; R19; 1	SUR; R20; Ret	SYM; R21; 2	SYM; R22; 6	SAN; R23; Ret	SAN; R24; 17	SYD; R25; Ret	SYD; R26; 9														5th	2466
2011	Garth Tander	2	Holden	YMC; R1; 6	YMC; R2; Ret	ADE; R3; 1	ADE; R4; 5	HAM; R5; 18	HAM; R6; 3	BAR; R7; 13	BAR; R8; 7	BAR; R9; 3	WIN; R10; 12	WIN; R11; 3	HID; R12; 18	HID; R13; 26	TOW; R14; 1	TOW; R15; 26	QLD; R16; 28	QLD; R17; 23	QLD; R18; 6	PHI; QR; 2	PHI; R19; 4	BAT; R20; 1	SUR; R21; 11	SUR; R22; 23	SYM; R23; 3	SYM; R24; 6	SAN; R25; 8	SAN; R26; 5	SYD; R27; 2	SYD; R28; 19												5th	2574
2012	Garth Tander	2	Holden	ADE; R1; 3	ADE; R2; 3	SYM; R3; 7	SYM; R4; 22	HAM; R5; 3	HAM; R6; 26	BAR; R7; Ret	BAR; R8; 10	BAR; R9; 14	PHI; R10; 4	PHI; R11; 10	HID; R12; 8	HID; R13; 9	TOW; R14; 3	TOW; R15; 4	QLD; R16; 27	QLD; R17; 15	SMP; R18; 4	SMP; R19; 9	SAN; QR; 3	SAN; R20; 4	BAT; R21; 25	SUR; R22; 4	SUR; R23; 5	YMC; R24; 7	YMC; R25; 5	YMC; R26; 7	WIN; R27; 8	WIN; R28; 13	SYD; R29; 21	SYD; R30; 16										7th	2462
2013	Garth Tander	2	Holden	ADE; R1; 7	ADE; R2; Ret	SYM; R3; 5	SYM; R4; 2	SYM; R5; 10	PUK; R6; 6	PUK; R7; 3	PUK; R8; 5	PUK; R9; 2	BAR; R10; 19	BAR; R11; 11	BAR; R12; 9	COA; R13; 5	COA; R14; 13	COA; R15; 6	COA; R16; 4	HID; R17; 13	HID; R18; 9	HID; R19; 5	TOW; R20; 8	TOW; R21; 1	QLD; R22; 8	QLD; R23; 11	QLD; R24; 21	WIN; R25; 8	WIN; R26; 23	WIN; R27; 4	SAN; QR; 13	SAN; R28; 22	BAT; R29; 4	SUR; R30; 18	SUR; R31; 7	PHI; R32; 1	PHI; R33; 10	PHI; R34; 15	SYD; R35; 14	SYD; R36; Ret				8th	2322
2014	Garth Tander	2	Holden	ADE; R1; 11	ADE; R2; 7	ADE; R3; 13	SYM; R4; 6	SYM; R5; 6	SYM; R6; 25	WIN; R7; 15	WIN; R8; 21	WIN; R9; 23	PUK; R10; 9	PUK; R11; 9	PUK; R12; 5	PUK; R13; 12	BAR; R14; 15	BAR; R15; 11	BAR; R16; 22	HID; R17; 5	HID; R18; 4	HID; R19; 6	TOW; R20; 2	TOW; R21; 1	TOW; R22; 2	QLD; R23; 8	QLD; R24; 8	QLD; R25; 9	SMP; R26; 2	SMP; R27; Ret	SMP; R28; 18	SAN; QR; 5	SAN; R29; 3	BAT; R30; DNS	SUR; R31; 9	SUR; R32; 12	PHI; R33; 4	PHI; R34; 4	PHI; R35; 2	SYD; R36; 10	SYD; R37; 10	SYD; R38; 2		9th	2289
2015	Garth Tander	2	Holden	ADE; R1; 7	ADE; R2; 4	ADE; R3; 3	SYM; R4; 8	SYM; R5; 5	SYM; R6; 4	BAR; R7; Ret	BAR; R8; 11	BAR; R9; 6	WIN; R10; 16	WIN; R11; Ret	WIN; R12; 5	HID; R13; 20	HID; R14; 8	HID; R15; 12	TOW; R16; 7	TOW; R17; 4	QLD; R18; 13	QLD; R19; 12	QLD; R20; 5	SMP; R21; 18	SMP; R22; 11	SMP; R23; 12	SAN; QR; 12	SAN; R24; 4	BAT; R25; 3	SUR; R26; 4	SUR; R27; 3	PUK; R28; 10	PUK; R29; 10	PUK; R30; 10	PHI; R31; 8	PHI; R32; 13	PHI; R33; 9	SYD; R34; 22	SYD; R35; 12	SYD; R36; 11				6th	2584
2016	Garth Tander	2	Holden	ADE; R1; 5	ADE; R2; 23	ADE; R3; 3	SYM; R4; 11	SYM; R5; 6	PHI; R6; 9	PHI; R7; 16	BAR; R8; 5	BAR; R9; 7	WIN; R10; 25	WIN; R11; 12	HID; R12; 23	HID; R13; 14	TOW; R14; 7	TOW; R15; 20	QLD; R16; 14	QLD; R17; 13	SMP; R18; 8	SMP; R19; 7	SAN; QR; 2	SAN; R20; 1	BAT; R21; Ret	SUR; R22; 15	SUR; R23; 11	PUK; R24; 5	PUK; R25; 10	PUK; R26; 10	PUK; R27; 7	SYD; R28; 2	SYD; R29; 2											9th	2252
2017	Scott Pye	2	Holden	ADE; R1; 16	ADE; R2; 19	SYM; R3; Ret	SYM; R4; 12	PHI; R5; 17	PHI; R6; 12	BAR; R7; 20	BAR; R8; 14	WIN; R9; 15	WIN; R10; 22	HID; R11; 23	HID; R12; 8	TOW; R13; 12	TOW; R14; 18	QLD; R15; 13	QLD; R16; 16	SMP; R17; 5	SMP; R18; 18	SAN; QR; 15	SAN; R19; 21	BAT; R20; 2	SUR; R21; 11	SUR; R22; 13	PUK; R23; 14	PUK; R24; 10	NEW; R25; 7	NEW; R26; 14														12th	1804
2018	Scott Pye	2	Holden	ADE; R1; 10	ADE; R2; 8	MEL; R3; 6	MEL; R4; 11	MEL; R5; 1	MEL; R6; 5	SYM; R7; 8	SYM; R8; 6	PHI; R9; 9	PHI; R10; 11	BAR; R11; 12	BAR; R12; 15	WIN; R13; 2	WIN; R14; 6	HID; R15; 4	HID; R16; 20	TOW; R17; 14	TOW; R18; 21	QLD; R19; 16	QLD; R20; 19	SMP; R21; 25	BEN; R22; 18	BEN; R23; 6	SAN; QR; 19	SAN; R24; 6	BAT; R25; 2	SUR; R26; 13	SUR; R27; C	PUK; R28; 6	PUK; R29; 15	NEW; R30; 4	NEW; R31; 10									7th	2608
2019	Scott Pye	2	Holden	ADE; R1; Ret	ADE; R2; 17	MEL; R3; 13	MEL; R4; 14	MEL; R5; 6	MEL; R6; 11	SYM; R7; 12	SYM; R8; 8	PHI; R9; 8	PHI; R10; 15	BAR; R11; 16	BAR; R12; Ret	WIN; R13; 10	WIN; R14; 8	HID; R15; 10	HID; R16; 19	TOW; R17; 20	TOW; R18; 15	QLD; R19; 21	QLD; R20; 16	BEN; R21; 15	BEN; R22; 16	PUK; R23; 13	PUK; R24; 6	BAT; R25; 7	SUR; R26; 5	SUR; R27; 4	SAN; QR; 23	SAN; R28; 5	NEW; R29; 6	NEW; R30; 5										12th	2193
2020	Bryce Fullwood	2	Holden	ADE; R1; 21	ADE; R2; 17	MEL; R3; C	MEL; R4; C	MEL; R5; C	MEL; R6; C	SMP1; R7; 13	SMP1; R8; 20	SMP1; R9; 10	SMP2; R10; 15	SMP2; R11; 15	SMP2; R12; 7	HID1; R13; 21	HID1; R14; 18	HID1; R15; 19	HID2; R16; 19	HID2; R17; 17	HID2; R18; 17	TOW1; R19; 8	TOW1; R20; 19	TOW1; R21; 12	TOW2; R22; 17	TOW2; R23; 12	TOW2; R24; 18	BEN1; R25; 3	BEN1; R26; 16	BEN1; R27; 19	BEN2; R28; 15	BEN2; R29; 18	BEN2; R30; 19	BAT; R31; Ret										18th	1092
2021	Bryce Fullwood	2	Holden	BAT; R1; 5	BAT; R2; 13	SAN; R3; 24	SAN; R4; 15	SAN; R5; 13	SYM; R6; 23	SYM; R7; 17	SYM; R8; 17	BEN; R9; 16	BEN; R10; 6	BEN; R11; 14	HID; R12; 11	HID; R13; 12	HID; R14; 14	TOW; R15; 11	TOW; R16; 13	TOW2; R17; 21	TOW2; R18; 14	TOW2; R19; 11	SYD1; R20; 18	SYD1; R21; 12	SYD1; R22; 18	SYD2; R23; 10	SYD2; R24; 16	SYD2; R25; 22	SYD3; R26; Ret	SYD3; R27; 10	SYD3; R28; 14	SYD4; R29; 23	SYD4; R30; C	BAT; R31; 5										14th	1491
2022	Nick Percat	2	Holden	SMP; R1; 6	SMP; R2; 23	SYM; R3; 24	SYM; R4; 11	SYM; R5; 10	MEL; R6; 5	MEL; R7; 17	MEL; R8; 16	MEL; R9; 6	BAR; R10; 21	BAR; R11; 18	BAR; R12; 15	WIN; R13; 14	WIN; R14; 15	WIN; R15; 16	HID; R16; 14	HID; R17; 10	HID; R18; 10	TOW; R19; 13	TOW; R20; 12	BEN; R21; 13	BEN; R22; Ret	BEN; R23; 9	SAN; R24; 15	SAN; R25; 19	SAN; R26; 22	PUK; R27; 8	PUK; R28; 14	PUK; R29; 9	BAT; R30; 22	SUR; R31; 10	SUR; R32; Ret	ADE; R33; 2	ADE; R34; 12							15th	1643
2023	Nick Percat	2	Ford	NEW; R1; Ret	NEW; R2; 23	MEL; R3; 14	MEL; R4 ret	MEL; R5; 16	MEL; R6; 20	BAR; R7; 17	BAR; R8; 19	BAR; R9; 13	SYM; R10; 9	SYM; R11; 10	SYM; R12; 23	HID; R13; 18	HID; R14; 19	HID; R15; 15	TOW; R16; 24	TOW; R17; 13	SMP; R18; 20	SMP; R19; 19	BEN; R20; 18	BEN; R21; 12	BEN; R22; 4	SAN; R23; 23	BAT; R24; 14	SUR; R25; 18	SUR; R26; 12	ADE; R27; 18	ADE; R28; 21													20th	1230
2024	Ryan Wood	2	Ford	BAT1; R1; Ret	BAT1; R2; Ret	MEL; R3; 19	MEL; R4; 12	MEL; R5; 10	MEL; R6; 21	TAU; R7; 4	TAU; R8; 11	BAR; R9; 4	BAR; R10; 8	HID; R11; 20	HID; R12; 24	TOW; R13; 17	TOW; R14; 6	SMP; R15; 13	SMP; R16; 16	SYM; R17; 11	SYM; R18; 8	SAN; R19; 15	BAT; R20; 15	SUR; R21; 22	SUR; R22; 21	ADE; R23; 10	ADE; R24; 19																	16th	1492
2025	Ryan Wood	2	Ford	SMP; R1; 11	SMP; R2; 20	SMP; R3; 14	MEL; R4; 5	MEL; R5; 22	MEL; R6; 6	MEL; R7; C	TAU; R8; 3	TAU; R9; 9	TAU; R10; 11	TAS; R11; 6	TAS; R12; 16	TAS; R13; 7	PER; R14; 1	PER; R15; 24	PER; R16; Ret	DAR; R17; Ret	DAR; R18; 9	DAR; R19; 8	TOW; R20; 12	TOW; R21; 8	TOW; R22; 7	QLD; R23; 3	QLD; R24; 3	QLD; R25; 21	BEN; R26; 6	BAT; R27; 19	SUR; R28; 20	SUR; R29; 9	SAN; R30; 3	SAN; R31; 23	ADE; R32; 3	ADE; R33; 3	ADE; R34; 24							10th	3455
2026	Ryan Wood	2	Toyota	SYD; R1	SYD; R2	SYD; R3	MEL; R4	MEL; R5	MEL; R6	MEL; R7	TAU; R8	TAU; R9	TAU; R10	CHR; R11	CHR; R12	CHR; R13	SYM; R14	SYM; R15	SYM; R16	BAR; R17	BAR; R18	BAR; R19	HID; R20	HID; R21	HID; R22	TOW; R23	TOW; R24	TOW; R25	QLD; R26	QLD; R27	QLD; R28	BEN; R28	BAT; R30	SUR; R31	SUR; R32	SAN; R33	SAN; R34	ADE; R35	ADE; R36	ADE; R37				–	–

=== Teams Championship results ===
Year	Car	Pos	Points
2005	Holden Commodore VZ	2nd	3379
2006	Holden Commodore VZ	7th	4423
2007	Holden Commodore VE	3rd	800
2008	Holden Commodore VE	4th	4432
2009	Holden Commodore VE	1st	5650
2010	Holden Commodore VE	7th	3618
2011	Holden Commodore VE	4th	4518
2012	Holden Commodore VE	4th	4690
2013	Holden Commodore VF	5th	4330
2014	Holden Commodore VF	3rd	4828
2015	Holden Commodore VF	3rd	5191
2016	Holden Commodore VF	2nd	4434
2017	Holden Commodore VF	7th	3270
2018	Holden Commodore ZB	5th	4681
2019	Holden Commodore ZB	6th	4449
2020	Holden Commodore ZB	7th	3050
2021	Holden Commodore ZB	4th	3985
2022	Holden Commodore ZB	4th	4448
2023	Mustang GT	6th	3487
2024	Mustang GT	3rd	4069
2025	Mustang GT	3rd	4187
2026	GR Supra		

== Supercars drivers ==
The following is a list of drivers who have driven for the team in Supercars, in order of their first appearance. Drivers who only drove for the team on a part-time basis are listed in italics.

- (United Kingdom) Win Percy (1990–93)
- (Australia) Neil Crompton (1990–91)
- (Australia) Allan Grice (1990–93)
- (Australia) Brad Jones (1990–94)
- (Australia) Tomas Mezera (1992–96, 2001–02)
- (Australia) Wayne Gardner (1993)
- (Australia) Mike Preston (1993)
- (Australia) Peter Brock (1994–97, 2004)
- (Australia) Craig Lowndes (1994–2000)
- (New Zealand) Greg Murphy (1995–98, 2013–14)
- (Australia) Mark Skaife (1997–2008)
- (Australia) Jason Bargwanna (1997)
- (Australia) Todd Kelly (1997, 1999, 2000, 2003–07)
- (Australia) Mark Noske (1997–99)
- (Australia) Stephen White (1997)
- (Australia) Cameron McConville (1999, 2010–12)
- (Australia) Paul Morris (1999)
- (Australia) Nathan Pretty (2000, 2002, 2007)
- (United Kingdom) Jason Plato (2000, 2004)
- (France) Yvan Muller (2000)
- (Australia) Jason Bright (2001–02)
- (Australia) Rick Kelly (2001–02)
- (Australia) Tony Longhurst (2001, 2003, 2007)
- (New Zealand) Jim Richards (2002–03, 2005–06)
- (Australia) James Courtney (2005, 2011–19)
- (Australia) Garth Tander (2006, 2008–16)
- (Australia) Ryan Briscoe (2006, 2010–13)
- (Australia) Glenn Seton (2007–08)
- (New Zealand) Craig Baird (2008–11)
- (Australia) Will Davison (2009–10)
- (Australia) Paul Dumbrell (2009)
- (Australia) David Reynolds (2009–10)
- (Australia) Steve Owen (2009)
- (Australia) Shane Price (2009)
- (New Zealand) Fabian Coulthard (2010–11, 2022–present)
- (Australia) Andrew Thompson (2010)
- (Australia) Nick Percat (2010–13, 2022–2023)
- (Finland) Mika Salo (2010)
- (United Kingdom) Darren Turner (2011–12)
- (United States) Patrick Long (2011)
- (Australia) Russell Ingall (2012–13, 2015)
- (Austria) Christian Klien (2012)
- (United Kingdom) Peter Dumbreck (2012)
- (Australia) Tim Slade (2014–15)
- (Australia) Warren Luff (2014–22)
- (Australia) Tony D'Alberto (2014–15)
- (Australia) Jack Perkins (2015–19)
- (Australia) Scott Pye (2017–19)
- (United States) Alexander Rossi (2019)
- (Canada) James Hinchcliffe (2019)
- (Australia) Chaz Mostert (2020–present)
- (Australia) Bryce Fullwood (2020–21)
- (Australia) Kurt Kostecki (2020)
- (Australia) Lee Holdsworth (2021, 2023–2024)
- (Australia) Jayden Ojeda (2022, 2025)
- (New Zealand) Ryan Wood (2024–present)
- (New Zealand) Jaxon Evans (2026-present)

== Super2 drivers ==
The following is a list of drivers who have driven for the team in Super2 Series, in order of their first appearance. Drivers who only drove for the team on a part-time basis are listed in italics.

- (Australia) Nick Percat (2011–2012)
- (Australia) Zach Bates (2023–2024)
- (New Zealand) Ryan Wood (2023)
- (Australia) Campbell Logan (2024–2025)
- (Australia) Matt Hillyer (2025)
