= 2001 V8 Supercar 1000 =

Motor race in Australia

Seasons
- ← 2000 2002 →

(New South Wales) 2001 V8 Supercar 1000
Event Information
- Round 11 of 13 in the 2001 Shell Championship Series
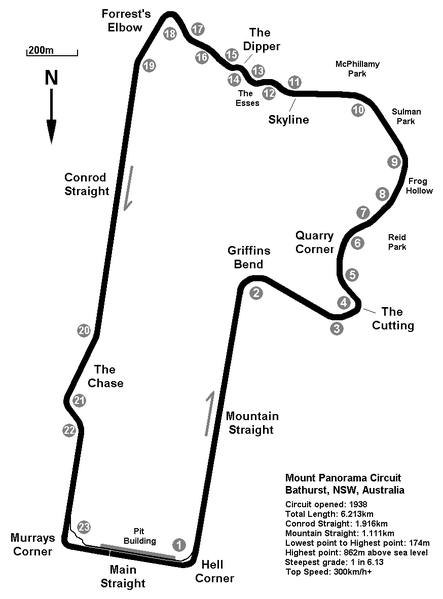
- Date: 4–7 October 2001
- Location: Bathurst, New South Wales
- Venue: Mount Panorama Circuit
- Weather: Fine, rain during middle of race

Results
Race 1
Distance	161 laps	1000 km
Pole position	Marcos Ambrose; Stone Brothers Racing	2:09.7785
Winner	Mark Skaife; Tony Longhurst; Holden Racing Team	6:50:33.1789
Round Results
First	Mark Skaife Tony Longhurst; Holden Racing Team	552 pts
Second	Brad Jones John Cleland; Brad Jones Racing	480 pts
Third	Greg Murphy Todd Kelly; Kmart Racing Team	432 pts

The 2001 V8 Supercar 1000 was the fifth running of the Australia 1000 race, first held after the organisational split over the Bathurst 1000 that occurred in 1997. It was the 44th race that traces its lineage back to the 1960 Armstrong 500 held at Phillip Island.

It was held on 7 October 2001 at the Mount Panorama Circuit just outside Bathurst and was Round 11 of the 2001 Shell Championship Series for V8 Supercars.

The race was left without a naming rights sponsor after the collapse of previous sponsor FAI Insurance in March 2001.

== Entry list ==
No.	Drivers	Team (Sponsor)	Car	No.	Drivers	Team (Sponsor)	Car
00	(Australia) Craig Lowndes (Australia) Neil Crompton	Gibson Motorsport (Ford)	Ford Falcon (AU)	24	(Australia) Paul Romano (Australia) Owen Kelly	Holden Young Lions (EA Sports)	Holden Commodore (VX)
1	(Australia) Mark Skaife (Australia) Tony Longhurst	Holden Racing Team (Holden, Mobil 1)	Holden Commodore (VX)	25	(Australia) Terry Wyhoon (Australia) Rod Salmon	Terry Wyhoon Racing (Lubrimaxx)	Ford Falcon (AU)
2	(Australia) Jason Bright (Australia) Tomas Mezera	Holden Racing Team (Holden, Mobil 1)	Holden Commodore (VX)	29	(Australia) Paul Morris (New Zealand) Ashley Stichbury	Paul Morris Motorsport (Sirromet Wines, Big Kev)	Holden Commodore (VT)
3	(Australia) Cameron McConville (Australia) Rick Bates	Lansvale Smash Repairs (Lansvale Smash Repairs)	Holden Commodore (VX)	31	(Australia) Steven Ellery (Australia) Geoff Brabham	Steven Ellery Racing (Supercheap Auto)	Ford Falcon (AU)
4	(Australia) Marcos Ambrose (Australia) Wayne Wakefield	Stone Brothers Racing (Pirtek)	Ford Falcon (AU)	34	(Australia) Garth Tander (Australia) Jason Bargwanna	Garry Rogers Motorsport (Valvoline, Repco)	Holden Commodore (VX)
5	(Australia) Glenn Seton (New Zealand) Steven Richards	Glenn Seton Racing (Ford, Ford Credit)	Ford Falcon (AU)	35	(Australia) Paul Dumbrell (Australia) Leanne Ferrier	Garry Rogers Motorsport (Valvoline, Repco)	Holden Commodore (VX)
6	(New Zealand) Jim Richards (Australia) Dean Canto	Glenn Seton Racing (Ford, Ford Credit)	Ford Falcon (AU)	37	(Australia) Bill Attard (Australia) Roger Hurd	Alan Taylor Racing (The Xerox Shop)	Holden Commodore (VS)
7	(Australia) Rodney Forbes (Australia) David Parsons	Gibson Motorsport (Data Dot)	Ford Falcon (AU)	43	(Australia) Paul Weel (Australia) Tim Leahey	Paul Weel Racing (K&J Thermal Products)	Ford Falcon (AU)
8	(Australia) Adam Macrow (Australia) Luke Youlden	Perkins Engineering (Castrol)	Holden Commodore (VX)	45	(Australia) Phillip Scifleet (Australia) Christian D'Agostin	RPM International Racing (Fujifilm)	Ford Falcon (AU)
9	(Australia) David Besnard (Australia) Matthew White	Stone Brothers Racing (Caltex Havoline)	Ford Falcon (AU)	46	(New Zealand) John Faulkner (Australia) Peter Doulman	John Faulkner Racing (Dynapack)	Holden Commodore (VT)
10	(Australia) Mark Larkham (Australia) Wayne Gardner	Larkham Motorsport (DecoRug, VIP Petfoods)	Ford Falcon (AU)	50	(Australia) Mick Donaher (Australia) Layton Crambrook	Clive Wiseman Racing (Ultra Tune)	Holden Commodore (VX)
11	(Australia) Larry Perkins (Australia) Russell Ingall	Perkins Engineering (Castrol)	Holden Commodore (VX)	51	(Australia) Nathan Pretty (Australia) Rick Kelly	Kmart Racing Team (Kmart)	Holden Commodore (VX)
14	(Australia) Steve Owen (Australia) James Brock	Imrie Motorsport (Europcar)	Holden Commodore (VX)	54	(Australia) Rod Nash (Australia) Tony Ricciardello	Rod Nash Racing (Ranex Rustbuster)	Holden Commodore (VX)
15	(Australia) Todd Kelly (New Zealand) Greg Murphy	Kmart Racing Team (Kmart)	Holden Commodore (VX)	61	(Australia) Ross Halliday (Australia) Greg Crick	Halliday Motorsport (3M)	Ford Falcon (AU)
16	(Australia) Dugal McDougall (Australia) Andrew Miedecke	McDougall Motorsport (Pepsi)	Holden Commodore (VX)	75	(Australia) Anthony Tratt (Australia) Alan Jones	Paul Little Racing (Toll Ipec)	Ford Falcon (AU)
17	(Australia) Steven Johnson (New Zealand) Paul Radisich	Dick Johnson Racing (Shell Helix)	Ford Falcon (AU)	88	(Australia) Craig Harris (Australia) Michael Simpson	Harris Racing (Castrol)	Ford Falcon (AU)
18	(Australia) Cameron McLean (Australia) Greg Ritter	Dick Johnson Racing (Shell Helix)	Ford Falcon (AU)	90	(Australia) Ric Shaw (Australia) Mike Conway	Ric Shaw Motorsport (Wine Trust Estates)	Holden Commodore (VS)
20	(Australia) Garry Holt (Australia) Kevin Mundy	Garry Holt Racing (Eastern Creek Karting)	Ford Falcon (EL)	500	(Australia) Alan Heath (Australia) Dale Brede	Power Racing (Coopers Pale Ale)	Ford Falcon (AU)
021	(New Zealand) Jason Richards (New Zealand) Angus Fogg	Team Kiwi Racing (Vodafone)	Holden Commodore (VT)	600	(Australia) John Bowe (New Zealand) Simon Wills	Briggs Motor Sport (Caterpillar)	Ford Falcon (AU)
21	(Australia) Brad Jones (United Kingdom) John Cleland	Brad Jones Racing (OzEmail)	Ford Falcon (AU)	888	(Australia) Mark Noske (New Zealand) Craig Baird	Prancing Horse Racing (Budweiser)	Ford Falcon (AU)
23	(Australia) Steve Reed (Australia) Trevor Ashby	Lansvale Smash Repairs (Lansvale Smash Repairs)	Holden Commodore (VX)				

== Results ==
=== Qualifying ===
Pos	No	Driver	Team	Car	Time
1	5	(Australia) Glenn Seton (New Zealand) Steven Richards	Glenn Seton Racing	Ford Falcon (AU)	2:09.6770
2	00	(Australia) Craig Lowndes (Australia) Neil Crompton	Gibson Motorsport	Ford Falcon (AU)	2:09.8533
3	1	(Australia) Mark Skaife (Australia) Tony Longhurst	Holden Racing Team	Holden Commodore (VX)	2:09.9621
4	2	(Australia) Jason Bright (Australia) Tomas Mezera	Holden Racing Team	Holden Commodore (VX)	2:10.2285
5	600	(Australia) John Bowe (New Zealand) Simon Wills	Briggs Motor Sport	Ford Falcon (AU)	2:10.2441
6	11	(Australia) Larry Perkins (Australia) Russell Ingall	Perkins Engineering	Holden Commodore (VX)	2:10.4869
7	31	(Australia) Steven Ellery (Australia) Geoff Brabham	Steven Ellery Racing	Ford Falcon (AU)	2:10.6664
8	15	(Australia) Todd Kelly (New Zealand) Greg Murphy	Kmart Racing Team	Holden Commodore (VX)	2:10.6836
9	34	(Australia) Garth Tander (Australia) Jason Bargwanna	Garry Rogers Motorsport	Holden Commodore (VX)	2:10.7412
10	18	(Australia) Cameron McLean (Australia) Greg Ritter	Dick Johnson Racing	Ford Falcon (AU)	2:10.8956
11	4	(Australia) Marcos Ambrose (Australia) Wayne Wakefield	Stone Brothers Racing	Ford Falcon (AU)	2:10.9040
12	17	(Australia) Steven Johnson (New Zealand) Paul Radisich	Dick Johnson Racing	Ford Falcon (AU)	2:10.9073
13	6	(New Zealand) Jim Richards (Australia) Dean Canto	Glenn Seton Racing	Ford Falcon (AU)	2:11.3017
14	43	(Australia) Paul Weel (Australia) Tim Leahey	Paul Weel Racing	Ford Falcon (AU)	2:11.3390
15	29	(Australia) Paul Morris (New Zealand) Ashley Stichbury	Paul Morris Motorsport	Holden Commodore (VT)	2:11.4556
16	9	(Australia) David Besnard (Australia) Matthew White	Stone Brothers Racing	Ford Falcon (AU)	2:11.6542
17	46	(New Zealand) John Faulkner (Australia) Peter Doulman	John Faulkner Racing	Holden Commodore (VT)	2:11.8804
18	10	(Australia) Mark Larkham (Australia) Wayne Gardner	Larkham Motor Sport	Ford Falcon (AU)	2:11.9038
19	51	(Australia) Nathan Pretty (Australia) Rick Kelly	Kmart Racing Team	Holden Commodore (VX)	2:12.0242
20	021	(New Zealand) Jason Richards (New Zealand) Angus Fogg	Team Kiwi Racing	Holden Commodore (VT)	2:12.0676
21	3	(Australia) Cameron McConville (Australia) Rick Bates	Lansvale Racing Team	Holden Commodore (VX)	2:12.1408
22	21	(Australia) Brad Jones (United Kingdom) John Cleland	Brad Jones Racing	Ford Falcon (AU)	2:12.2942
23	16	(Australia) Dugal McDougall (Australia) Andrew Miedecke	McDougall Motorsport	Holden Commodore (VX)	2:12.5184
24	8	(Australia) Adam Macrow (Australia) Luke Youlden	Perkins Engineering	Holden Commodore (VX)	2:12.6301
25	75	(Australia) Anthony Tratt (Australia) Alan Jones	Paul Little Racing	Ford Falcon (AU)	2:12.9820
26	35	(Australia) Leanne Ferrier (Australia) Paul Dumbrell	Garry Rogers Motorsport	Holden Commodore (VX)	2:12.9841
27	888	(Australia) Mark Noske (New Zealand) Craig Baird	Prancing Horse Racing	Ford Falcon (AU)	2:13.3303
28	54	(Australia) Rod Nash (Australia) Tony Ricciardello	Rod Nash Racing	Holden Commodore (VX)	2:13.6990
29	24	(Australia) Paul Romano (Australia) Owen Kelly	Romano Racing	Holden Commodore (VX)	2:13.7193
30	7	(Australia) Rodney Forbes (Australia) David Parsons	Gibson Motorsport	Ford Falcon (AU)	2:13.9108
31	23	(Australia) Steve Reed (Australia) Trevor Ashby	Lansvale Racing Team	Holden Commodore (VX)	2:14.4264
32	61	(Australia) Ross Halliday (Australia) Greg Crick	Halliday Motor Sport	Ford Falcon (AU)	2:14.5407
33	25	(Australia) Terry Wyhoon (Australia) Rod Salmon	Terry Wyhoon Racing	Ford Falcon (AU)	2:14.5739
34	45	(Australia) Phillip Scifleet (Australia) Christian D'Agostin	RPM International Racing	Ford Falcon (AU)	2:14.7737
35	88	(Australia) Craig Harris (Australia) Michael Simpson	Harris Racing	Ford Falcon (AU)	2:15.6148
36	500	(Australia) Alan Heath (Australia) Dale Brede	Power Racing	Ford Falcon (AU)	2:15.9640
37	14	(Australia) James Brock (Australia) Steve Owen	Imrie Motorsport	Holden Commodore (VX)	2:16.7474
38	20	(Australia) Garry Holt (Australia) Kevin Mundy	Eastern Creek Kart Racing	Ford Falcon (EL)	2:17.5861
39	90	(Australia) Ric Shaw (Australia) Mike Conway	Ric Shaw Motorsport	Holden Commodore (VS)	2:18.0777
40	37	(Australia) Bill Attard (Australia) Roger Hurd	Scotty Taylor Racing	Holden Commodore (VS)	2:20.6454
-	50	(Australia) Mick Donaher (Australia) Layton Crambrook	Clive Wiseman Racing	Holden Commodore (VX)	No Time

=== Top-Fifteen Shootout ===
Pos	No	Driver	Team	Car	Time
Pole	4	(Australia) Marcos Ambrose	Stone Brothers Racing	Ford Falcon (AU)	2:09.7785
2	5	(Australia) Glenn Seton	Glenn Seton Racing	Ford Falcon (AU)	2:09.9804
3	11	(Australia) Russell Ingall	Perkins Engineering	Holden Commodore (VX)	2:09.9912
4	2	(Australia) Jason Bright	Holden Racing Team	Holden Commodore (VX)	2:10.1178
5	1	(Australia) Mark Skaife	Holden Racing Team	Holden Commodore (VX)	2:10.1599
6	17	(Australia) Steven Johnson	Dick Johnson Racing	Ford Falcon (AU)	2:10.3538
7	600	(Australia) John Bowe	Briggs Motor Sport	Ford Falcon (AU)	2:10.4338
8	31	(Australia) Steven Ellery	Steven Ellery Racing	Ford Falcon (AU)	2:10.4735
9	34	(Australia) Garth Tander	Garry Rogers Motorsport	Holden Commodore (VX)	2:10.4999
10	6	(New Zealand) Jim Richards	Glenn Seton Racing	Ford Falcon (AU)	2:10.5180
11	15	(Australia) Todd Kelly	Kmart Racing Team	Holden Commodore (VX)	2:10.8654
12	00	(Australia) Craig Lowndes	Gibson Motorsport	Ford Falcon (AU)	2:11.0141
13	18	(Australia) Greg Ritter	Dick Johnson Racing	Ford Falcon (AU)	2:11.2323
14	29	(Australia) Paul Morris	Paul Morris Motorsport	Holden Commodore (VT)	2:11.3743
15	43	(Australia) Paul Weel	Paul Weel Racing	Ford Falcon (AU)	2:11.5767

=== Starting grid ===
Inside row					Outside row				
1	(Australia) Marcos Ambrose (Australia) Wayne Wakefield	4			5	(Australia) Glenn Seton (New Zealand) Steven Richards			2
1	Stone Brothers Racing (Ford Falcon AU)				Glenn Seton Racing (Ford Falcon AU)				2
3			(Australia) Larry Perkins (Australia) Russell Ingall	11			2	(Australia) Jason Bright (Australia) Tomas Mezera	4
3			Perkins Engineering (Holden Commodore VX)				Holden Racing Team (Holden Commodore VX)		4
5	(Australia) Mark Skaife (Australia) Tony Longhurst	1			17	(Australia) Steven Johnson (New Zealand) Paul Radisich			6
5	Holden Racing Team (Holden Commodore VX)				Dick Johnson Racing (Ford Falcon AU)				6
7			(Australia) John Bowe (New Zealand) Simon Wills	600			31	(Australia) Steven Ellery (Australia) Geoff Brabham	8
7			Briggs Motor Sport (Ford Falcon AU)				Steven Ellery Racing (Ford Falcon AU)		8
9	(Australia) Garth Tander (Australia) Jason Bargwanna	34			6	(Australia) Jim Richards (Australia) Dean Canto			10
9	Garry Rogers Motorsport (Holden Commodore VX)				Glenn Seton Racing (Ford Falcon AU)				10
11			(Australia) Todd Kelly (New Zealand) Greg Murphy	15			00	(Australia) Craig Lowndes (Australia) Neil Crompton	12
11			K-mart Racing Team (Holden Commodore VX)				Gibson Motorsport (Ford Falcon AU)		12
13	(Australia) Cameron McLean (Australia) Greg Ritter	18			29	(Australia) Paul Morris (New Zealand) Ashley Stichbury			14
13	Dick Johnson Racing (Ford Falcon AU)				Paul Morris Motorsport (Holden Commodore VT)				14
15			(Australia) Paul Weel (Australia) Tim Leahey	43			9	(Australia) David Besnard (Australia) Matthew White	16
15			Paul Weel Racing (Ford Falcon AU)				Stone Brothers Racing (Ford Falcon AU)		16
17	(Australia) John Faulkner (Australia) Peter Doulman	46			10	(Australia) Mark Larkham (Australia) Wayne Gardner			18
17	John Faulkner Racing (Holden Commodore VT)				Larkham Motor Sport (Ford Falcon AU)				18
19			(Australia) Nathan Pretty (Australia) Rick Kelly	51			021	(New Zealand) Jason Richards (New Zealand) Angus Fogg	20
19			K-mart Racing Team (Holden Commodore VX)				Team Kiwi Racing (Holden Commodore VT)		20
21	(Australia) Cameron McConville (Australia) Rick Bates	3			21	(Australia) Brad Jones (United Kingdom) John Cleland			22
21	Lansvale Smash Repairs (Holden Commodore VX)				Brad Jones Racing (Ford Falcon AU)				22
23			(Australia) Dugal McDougall (Australia) Andrew Miedecke	16			8	(Australia) Adam Macrow (Australia) Luke Youlden	24
23			McDougall Motorsport (Holden Commodore VX)				Perkins Engineering (Holden Commodore VX)		24
25	(Australia) Anthony Tratt (Australia) Alan Jones	75			35	(Australia) Paul Dumbrell (Australia) Leanne Ferrier			26
25	Paul Little Racing (Ford Falcon AU)				Garry Rogers Motorsport (Holden Commodore VX)				26
27			(Australia) Mark Noske (New Zealand) Craig Baird	888			54	(Australia) Rod Nash (Australia) Tony Ricciardello	28
27			Prancing Horse Racing (Ford Falcon AU)				Rod Nash Racing (Holden Commodore VX)		28
29	(Australia) Paul Romano (Australia) Owen Kelly	24			7	(Australia) Rodney Forbes (Australia) David Parsons			30
29	Romano Racing (Holden Commodore VX)				Gibson Motorsport (Ford Falcon AU)				30
31			(Australia) Steve Reed (Australia) Trevor Ashby	23			61	(Australia) Ross Halliday (Australia) Greg Crick	32
31			Lansvale Smash Repairs (Holden Commodore VX)				Halliday Motorsport (Ford Falcon AU)		32
33	(Australia) Terry Wyhoon (Australia) Rod Salmon	25			45	(Australia) Phillip Scifleet (Australia) Christian D'Agostin			34
33	Terry Wyhoon Racing (Ford Falcon AU)				RPM International Racing (Ford Falcon AU)				34
35			(Australia) Craig Harris (Australia) Michael Simpson	88			500	(Australia) Alan Heath (Australia) Dale Brede	36
35			Harris Racing (Ford Falcon AU)				Power Racing (Ford Falcon AU)		36
37	(Australia) Steve Owen (Australia) James Brock	14			20	(Australia) Garry Holt (Australia) Kevin Mundy			38
37	Imrie Motorsport (Holden Commodore VX)				Eastern Creek Karting (Ford Falcon EL)				38
39			(Australia) Mick Donaher (Australia) Layton Crambrook	50					
39			Clive Wiseman Racing (Holden Commodore VX)						

=== Race ===
Pos	No	Drivers	Team	Car	Laps	Time	Grid
1	1	(Australia) Mark Skaife (Australia) Tony Longhurst	Holden Racing Team	Holden Commodore (VX)	161	6hr 50min 33.1789sec	5
2	21	(Australia) Brad Jones (United Kingdom) John Cleland	Brad Jones Racing	Ford Falcon (AU)	161	+ 2.28 s	22
3	15	(Australia) Todd Kelly (New Zealand) Greg Murphy	Kmart Racing Team	Holden Commodore (VX)	161	+ 17.94 s	11
4	18	(Australia) Cameron McLean (Australia) Greg Ritter	Dick Johnson Racing	Ford Falcon (AU)	161	+ 26.11 s	13
5	6	(New Zealand) Jim Richards (Australia) Dean Canto	Glenn Seton Racing	Ford Falcon (AU)	161	+ 30.78 s	10
6	34	(Australia) Garth Tander (Australia) Jason Bargwanna	Garry Rogers Motorsport	Holden Commodore (VX)	161	+ 34.34 s	9
7	31	(Australia) Steven Ellery (Australia) Geoff Brabham	Steven Ellery Racing	Ford Falcon (AU)	161	+ 46.57 s	8
8	11	(Australia) Larry Perkins (Australia) Russell Ingall	Perkins Engineering	Holden Commodore (VX)	161	+ 1:22.61 s	3
9	5	(Australia) Glenn Seton (New Zealand) Steven Richards	Glenn Seton Racing	Ford Falcon (AU)	161	+ 2:18.61 s	2
10	3	(Australia) Cameron McConville (Australia) Rick Bates	Lansvale Racing Team	Holden Commodore (VX)	160	+ 1 Lap	21
11	23	(Australia) Steve Reed (Australia) Trevor Ashby	Lansvale Racing Team	Holden Commodore (VX)	159	+ 2 Laps	31
12	29	(Australia) Paul Morris (New Zealand) Ashley Stichbury	Paul Morris Motorsport	Holden Commodore (VT)	159	+ 2 Laps	14
13	24	(Australia) Paul Romano (Australia) Owen Kelly	Romano Racing	Holden Commodore (VX)	159	+ 2 Laps	29
14	51	(Australia) Nathan Pretty (Australia) Rick Kelly	Kmart Racing Team	Holden Commodore (VX)	158	+ 3 Laps	19
15	75	(Australia) Anthony Tratt (Australia) Alan Jones	Paul Little Racing	Ford Falcon (AU)	158	+ 3 Laps	25
16	021	(New Zealand) Jason Richards (New Zealand) Angus Fogg	Team Kiwi Racing	Holden Commodore (VT)	157	+ 4 Laps	20
17	00	(Australia) Craig Lowndes (Australia) Neil Crompton	Gibson Motorsport	Ford Falcon (AU)	156	+ 5 Laps	12
18	500	(Australia) Alan Heath (Australia) Dale Brede	Power Racing	Ford Falcon (AU)	155	+ 6 Laps	36
19	45	(Australia) Phillip Scifleet (Australia) Christian D'Agostin	RPM International Racing	Ford Falcon (AU)	147	+ 14 Laps	34
20	16	(Australia) Dugal McDougall (Australia) Andrew Miedecke	McDougall Motorsport	Holden Commodore (VX)	144	+ 17 Laps	23
21	7	(Australia) Rodney Forbes (Australia) David Parsons	Gibson Motorsport	Ford Falcon (AU)	132	+ 29 Laps	30
Ret	43	(Australia) Paul Weel (Australia) Tim Leahey	Paul Weel Racing	Ford Falcon (AU)	127	Retired	15
Ret	2	(Australia) Jason Bright (Australia) Tomas Mezera	Holden Racing Team	Holden Commodore (VX)	126	Spun off	4
Ret	600	(Australia) John Bowe (New Zealand) Simon Wills	Briggs Motor Sport	Ford Falcon (AU)	124	Spun off	7
Ret	88	(Australia) Craig Harris (Australia) Michael Simpson	Harris Racing	Ford Falcon (AU)	114	Accident	35
Ret	10	(Australia) Mark Larkham (Australia) Wayne Gardner	Larkham Motor Sport	Ford Falcon (AU)	106	Accident	18
Ret	8	(Australia) Adam Macrow (Australia) Luke Youlden	Perkins Engineering	Holden Commodore (VX)	85	Accident	24
Ret	9	(Australia) David Besnard (Australia) Matthew White	Stone Brothers Racing	Ford Falcon (AU)	84	Fuel Tank Damage	16
Ret	17	(Australia) Steven Johnson (New Zealand) Paul Radisich	Dick Johnson Racing	Ford Falcon (AU)	63	Engine	6
Ret	54	(Australia) Rod Nash (Australia) Tony Ricciardello	Rod Nash Racing	Holden Commodore (VX)	62	Accident	28
Ret	25	(Australia) Terry Wyhoon (Australia) Rod Salmon	Terry Wyhoon Racing	Ford Falcon (AU)	46	Accident	33
Ret	4	(Australia) Marcos Ambrose (Australia) Wayne Wakefield	Stone Brothers Racing	Ford Falcon (AU)	42	Engine	1
Ret	35	(Australia) Leanne Ferrier (Australia) Paul Dumbrell	Garry Rogers Motorsport	Holden Commodore (VX)	41	Steering	26
Ret	46	(New Zealand) John Faulkner (Australia) Peter Doulman	John Faulkner Racing	Holden Commodore (VT)	33	Accident	17
Ret	50	(Australia) Mick Donaher (Australia) Layton Crambrook	Clive Wiseman Racing	Holden Commodore (VX)	32	Accident	DNQ
Ret	61	(Australia) Ross Halliday (Australia) Greg Crick	Halliday Motor Sport	Ford Falcon (AU)	31	Retired	32
Ret	888	(Australia) Mark Noske (New Zealand) Craig Baird	Prancing Horse Racing	Ford Falcon (AU)	27	Accident	27
Ret	20	(Australia) Garry Holt (Australia) Kevin Mundy	Eastern Creek Kart Racing	Ford Falcon (EL)	26	Accident	38
Ret	14	(Australia) James Brock (Australia) Steve Owen	Imrie Motorsport	Holden Commodore (VX)	12	Deflated Tyre	37
DNQ	90	(Australia) Ric Shaw (Australia) Mike Conway	Ric Shaw Motorsport	Holden Commodore (VS)		Did not qualify	
DNQ	37	(Australia) Bill Attard (Australia) Roger Hurd	Scotty Taylor Racing	Holden Commodore (VS)		Did not qualify	
Fastest Lap: Simon Wills (Briggs Motorsport) - 2:10.2011 on lap 59

== Broadcast ==
Network 10 broadcast the race for the fifth consecutive year, dating back to the 1997 5.0L race. Trent Higgs was also part of the coverage providing interviews from pit lane.

Network 10
Host: Bill Woods
Booth: Leigh Diffey, Mark Oastler, Barry Sheene
Pit-lane: Greg Rust, Grant Denyer

== Championship points ==
Round points tally

Pos.	No	Driver	Team	Pts
1	1	(Australia) Mark Skaife (Australia) Tony Longhurst	Holden Racing Team	552
2	21	(Australia) Brad Jones (United Kingdom) John Cleland	Brad Jones Racing	480
3	15	(Australia) Todd Kelly (New Zealand) Greg Murphy	Tom Walkinshaw Racing Australia	432
4	18	(Australia) Greg Ritter (Australia) Cameron McLean	Dick Johnson Racing	396
5	6	(Australia) Dean Canto (New Zealand) Jim Richards	Glenn Seton Racing	379

Drivers' Championship standings after Round 11

Pos.	No	Driver	Team	Pts
1	1	(Australia) Mark Skaife	Holden Racing Team	3050
2	8	(Australia) Russell Ingall	Perkins Engineering	2595
3	2	(Australia) Jason Bright	Holden Racing Team	2504
4	17	(Australia) Steven Johnson	Dick Johnson Racing	2276
5	51	(New Zealand) Greg Murphy	Tom Walkinshaw Racing Australia	2274

== Statistics ==
- Provisional Pole Position - #5 Glenn Seton - 2:09.6770
- Pole Position - #4 Marcos Ambrose - 2:09.7785
- Fastest Lap - #600 Simon Wills - 2:10.2011 (new lap record)
- Average Speed - 146 km/h
