= 2000 FAI 1000 =

Motor race in Australia

Seasons
- ← 1999 2001 →

(New South Wales) 2000 FAI 1000
Event Information
- Round 13 of 13 in the 2000 Shell Championship Series
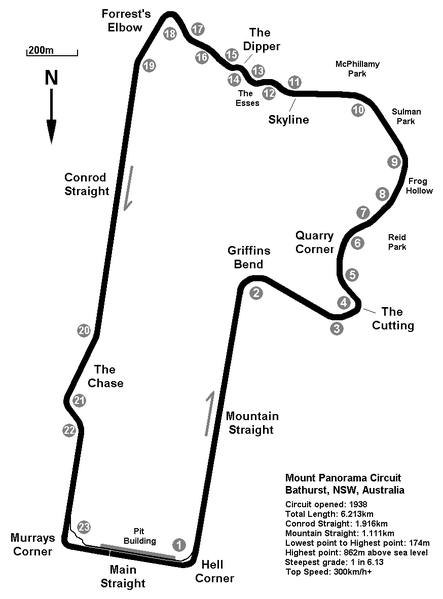
- Date: 16–19 November 2000
- Location: Bathurst, New South Wales
- Venue: Mount Panorama Circuit
- Weather: Wet

Results
Race 1
Distance	161 laps	1000 km
Pole position	(Australia) Wayne Gardner; Glenn Seton Racing	2:28.3844
Winner	(Australia) Garth Tander (Australia) Jason Bargwanna; Garry Rogers Motorsport	7:23:30.2348
Round Results
First	(Australia) Garth Tander (Australia) Jason Bargwanna; Garry Rogers Motorsport	240 pts
Second	(New Zealand) Paul Radisich (Australia) Jason Bright; Dick Johnson Racing	216 pts
Third	(New Zealand) Steven Richards (New Zealand) Greg Murphy; Gibson Motorsport	204 pts

The 2000 FAI 1000 was a race for V8 Supercars, held on 19 November 2000 at the Mount Panorama Circuit just outside Bathurst in New South Wales Australia. The race was the thirteenth and final round of the 2000 Shell Championship Series. It was the fourth running of the Australia 1000, first held after the organisational split over the Bathurst 1000 that occurred in 1997. It was the 43rd race that traces its lineage back to the 1960 Armstrong 500 held at Phillip Island.

Pole position was claimed by Wayne Gardner, with the race victory going to Garth Tander and Jason Bargwanna also driving a Holden Commodore for Garry Rogers Motorsport. It was held in mostly wet conditions which resulted in several safety car periods. As a result, the average race speed of the winning car was the slowest since the 1974 Bathurst 1000.

The event's naming rights sponsor was FAI Insurance.

== Entry list ==
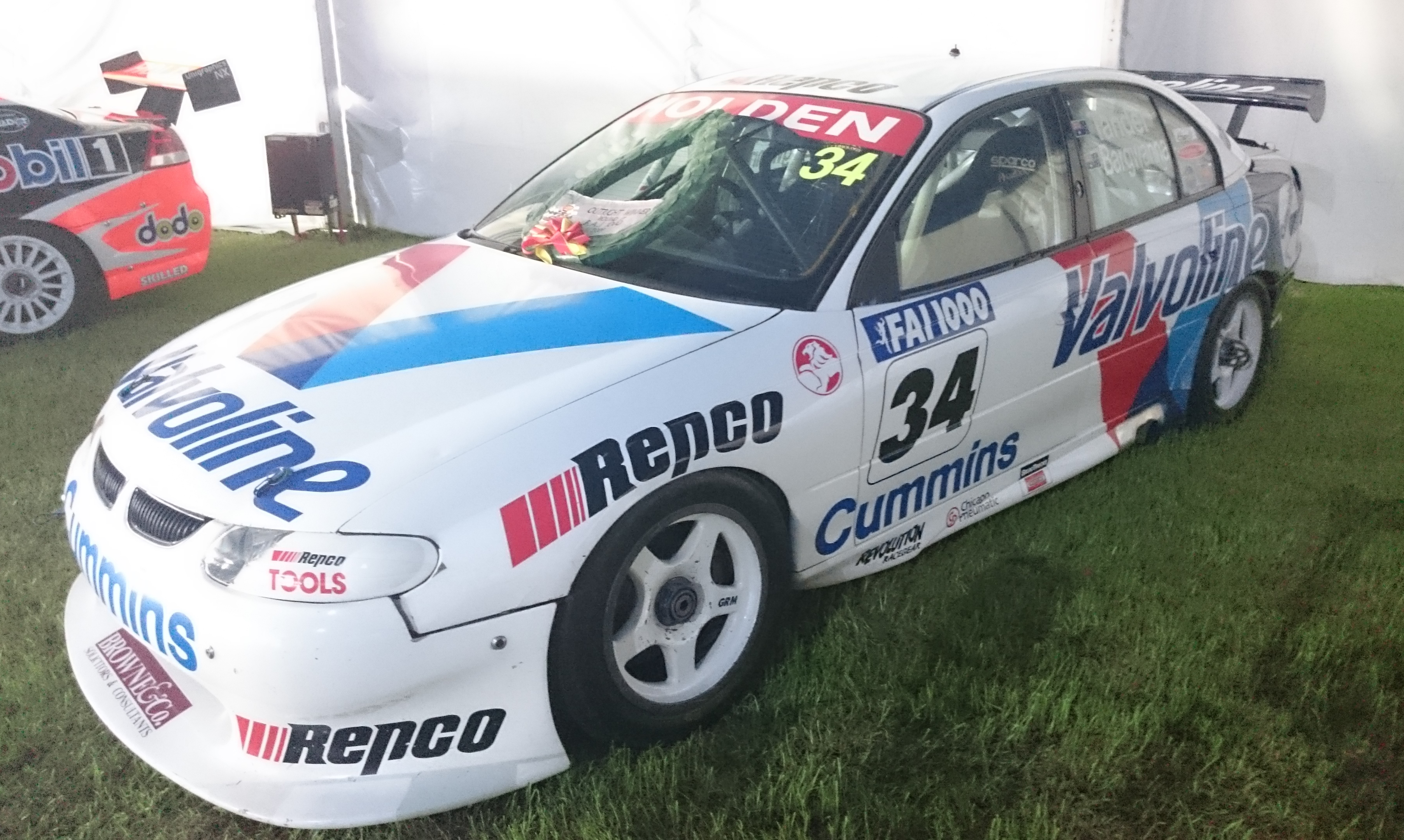
The Holden Commodore VT with which Garth Tander and Jason Bargwanna won the 2000 FAI 1000. The car is pictured in 2018.

No.	Drivers	Team (Sponsor)	Car	No.	Drivers	Team (Sponsor)	Car
1	(Australia) Craig Lowndes (Australia) Mark Skaife	Holden Racing Team (Holden, Mobil 1)	Holden Commodore VT	34	(Australia) Garth Tander (Australia) Jason Bargwanna	Garry Rogers Motorsport (Valvoline)	Holden Commodore VT
2	(United Kingdom) Jason Plato (France) Yvan Muller	Holden Racing Team (Holden, Mobil 1)	Holden Commodore VT	35	(Australia) Greg Ritter (Australia) Tim Leahey	Garry Rogers Motorsport (Valvoline)	Holden Commodore VT
3	(Australia) Steve Reed (Australia) Trevor Ashby	Lansvale Smash Repairs (Optus)	Holden Commodore VS	36	(Australia) Neil Schembri (Australia) Gary Quartly	Schembri Motorsport (BetterGrow)	Ford Falcon EL
4	(New Zealand) Craig Baird (New Zealand) Simon Wills	Stone Brothers Racing (Pirtek)	Ford Falcon AU	37	(Australia) Bill Attard (Australia) Roger Hurd	Alan Taylor Racing (The Xerox Shop)	Holden Commodore VS
5	(Australia) Glenn Seton (Australia) Neil Crompton	Glenn Seton Racing (Ford, Ford Credit)	Ford Falcon AU	38	(Australia) Peter Field (Australia) Shane Howison	South Pacific Motor Racing (Robbo's Spare Parts)	Holden Commodore VS
6	(Australia) Wayne Gardner (Australia) Neal Bates	Glenn Seton Racing (Ford, Ford Credit)	Ford Falcon AU	42	(Australia) Bill Sieders (Australia) Luke Sieders	Sieders Racing Team (All Trans Trucks & Spares)	Ford Falcon EL
7	(New Zealand) Steven Richards (New Zealand) Greg Murphy	Gibson Motorsport (Kmart)	Holden Commodore VT	43	(Australia) Paul Weel (Australia) Greg Crick	Paul Weel Racing (K&J Thermal Products)	Ford Falcon AU
8	(Australia) Luke Youlden (Singapore) Christian Murchison	Perkins Engineering (Castrol)	Holden Commodore VT	44	(Australia) Mal Rose (Australia) Christian D'Agostin	Mal Rose Racing (Logical Business)	Holden Commodore VS
9	(Australia) Tony Longhurst (Australia) David Besnard	Stone Brothers Racing (Caltex Havoline)	Ford Falcon AU	45	(Australia) Dean Canto (Australia) Ian Moncrieff	Dean Canto Racing (BMC Software)	Ford Falcon AU
10	(Australia) Mark Larkham (Switzerland) Alain Menu	Larkham Motorsport (Mitre 10)	Ford Falcon AU	46	(New Zealand) John Faulkner (Australia) Adam Macrow	John Faulkner Racing (AsiaOnline)	Holden Commodore VT
11	(Australia) Larry Perkins (Australia) Russell Ingall	Perkins Engineering (Castrol)	Holden Commodore VT	50	(Australia) Mick Donaher (Australia) Tyler Mecklem	Clive Wiseman Racing (Ultra Tune, TDK)	Holden Commodore VT
12	(Australia) David Parsons (Australia) Darren Hossack	Gibson Motorsport (Kmart)	Holden Commodore VT	54	(Australia) Cameron McConville (Australia) Geoff Brabham	Rod Nash Racing (Delphi, Wynn's)	Holden Commodore VT
14	(Australia) Rodney Crick (Australia) Peter Gazzard	Imrie Motorsport (CarPlan, Saabwreck)	Holden Commodore VT	55	(Australia) Rod Nash (Australia) Paul Dumbrell	Rod Nash Racing (AutoPro)	Holden Commodore VT
15	(Australia) Nathan Pretty (Australia) Todd Kelly	Holden Young Lions (MyCar Automotive Store)	Holden Commodore VT	56	(Australia) Robert Russell (Australia) Steve Coulter	Sieders Racing Team (All Trans Trucks & Spares)	Ford Falcon EL
16	(Australia) Dugal McDougall (Australia) Andrew Miedecke	McDougall Motorsport (Pepsi)	Holden Commodore VT	57	(New Zealand) Chris Butler (New Zealand) Miles Pope	Trevor Crittenden Motorsport (Shire of Caboolture)	Holden Commodore VS
17	(Australia) Steven Johnson (Australia) Cameron McLean	Dick Johnson Racing (Shell Helix)	Ford Falcon AU	59	(Australia) Layton Crambrook (Australia) Gary Baxter	John Scotcher Motorsport (Prime Security Systems, BP)	Ford Falcon EL
18	(New Zealand) Paul Radisich (Australia) Jason Bright	Dick Johnson Racing (Shell Helix)	Ford Falcon AU	61	(Australia) Ross Halliday (Australia) Adam Wallis	Halliday Motorsport (3M)	Ford Falcon EL
20	(Australia) Garry Holt (Australia) Garry Willmington	Emerzidis Motorsport (Eastern Creek Karting)	Ford Falcon EL	67	(Australia) Owen Kelly (Australia) Aaron McGill	Paul Morris Motorsport (Big Kev)	Holden Commodore VS
21	(Australia) Brad Jones (Australia) Tomas Mezera	Brad Jones Racing (OzEmail)	Ford Falcon AU	75	(Australia) Anthony Tratt (Australia) Alan Jones	Paul Little Racing (Toll)	Ford Falcon AU
22	(Australia) Rick Bates (Australia) Brett Peters	Colourscan Racing (Colourscan Printing)	Ford Falcon AU	76	(Australia) Matthew White (Australia) Steve Owen	MW Motorsport (Challenge Recruitment)	Holden Commodore VS
23	(Australia) Geoff Full (Australia) Phillip Scifleet	Lansvale Smash Repairs (Optus)	Holden Commodore VS	77	(Australia) Richard Mork (Australia) Steve Williams	V8 Racing (Cromer Exhaust Centre)	Holden Commodore VS
24	(Australia) Paul Romano (Australia) David Parsons	Romano Racing (Forsyth & Romano Timber Merchants)	Holden Commodore VS	87	(Australia) Rod Salmon (Australia) Damien White	Rod Salmon Racing (OneWorld Sports Bar)	Ford Falcon AU
25	(Australia) Terry Wyhoon (Australia) James Brock	Terry Wyhoon Racing (Biante Model Cars)	Holden Commodore VS	96	(Australia) Ryan McLeod (Australia) Wayne Wakefield	John Faulkner Racing (Chiko Roll)	Holden Commodore VS
26	(Australia) Peter Doulman (Australia) John Cotter	Doulman Automotive (Gatorade)	Holden Commodore VT	97	(Australia) Tim Sipp (Australia) Shane Beikoff	Graphic Skills Racing (Ultimate Patios, Graphic Skills)	Holden Commodore VS
28	(Australia) Rodney Forbes (United Kingdom) John Cleland	Gibson Motorsport (Wynn's)	Holden Commodore VT	150	(Australia) Dean Lindstrom (Australia) Melinda Price	Clive Wiseman Racing (UltraTune, TDK)	Holden Commodore VS
29	(Australia) Paul Morris (United Kingdom) Matt Neal	Paul Morris Motorsport (Big Kev)	Holden Commodore VT	500	(Australia) Alan Heath (Australia) Terry Finnigan	Power Racing (Coopers Pale Ale)	Ford Falcon AU
30	(Australia) Craig Harris (Australia) Stephen Voight	Harris Racing (carsales.com)	Ford Falcon AU	600	(Australia) John Bowe (New Zealand) Jim Richards	Briggs Motor Sport (Caterpillar)	Ford Falcon AU
31	(Australia) Steven Ellery (Australia) Paul Stokell	Steven Ellery Racing (Supercheap Auto)	Ford Falcon AU	777	(New Zealand) Jason Richards (New Zealand) Angus Fogg	Team Kiwi Racing (Vodafone)	Holden Commodore VT

== Report ==
=== Pre-race ===
Central West NSW had suffered a deluge of rain in the week leading up to the 2000 Bathurst 1000. Both Thursday practice sessions were cancelled, with only pre-qualifying taking place. With a grid capacity of 55 and a field of 56, only one car was cut from the field – Trevor Crittenden Motorsport's Kiwi pairing of Chris Butler and Miles Pope were the unlucky team having suffered electrical problems; their blue-and-white Holden Commodore VS only completed 200m of its out lap, and despite a battery change did not set a time. Practice Three did take place, and proved eventful with crashes for both Adam Wallis in Ross Halliday's Ford Falcon EL at the Chase, and Dean Lindstrom in the second Clive Wiseman Racing Holden Commodore VS having aquaplaned on Mountain Straight.

"We seem to have a lot of drivers out there from Planet Mork. There are so many dickheads and wankers out there I can't believe it. Out of the number of years I've been here, this is the worst."

— Russell Ingall in the post-qualifying press conference.

The circuit dried enough for slicks by Friday Qualifying. Championship leader Mark Skaife set the benchmark with a 2:11.8882, one-tenth of a second faster than Paul Radisich from Dick Johnson Racing. Privateer Mick Donaher in the lead Clive Wiseman car had led early in the session with rain threatening, and ended the session a remarkable 14th. A number of high-profile drivers were affected by traffic in the session, with Russell Ingall earning a AU$10,000 fine and a verbal quarrel with privateer cult-hero Richard Mork for his blunt summation of the situation.

The Top 10 Shootout was held on Saturday morning, the last morning Shootout before a switch to a Top 15 Shootout held in the afternoon from 2001. 1987 500cc motorcycle World Champion Wayne Gardner took pole in the second Glenn Seton Racing Ford Falcon AU in an all-Ford front row, as Steven Johnson lined up alongside him despite setting a time over a second slower. Skaife in third was the only Holden driver to set a representative time as Todd Kelly, Russell Ingall and Garth Tander all went off the circuit on their timed laps.

=== Race ===
First half

Gardner led a 53-car grid off the start. Alan Heath's Power Racing Falcon failed to start the race having blown an engine in the warm-up, whereas the second Paul Morris Motorsport Commodore of Owen Kelly started from the pits with an unidentified problem in the rear end. Having completed a lap, Kelly returned to the garage to retire the car having discovered a broken axle. Radisich jumped a row on the start and finished the opening lap in the top three.

The wet conditions remained steady and, having toyed with a Safety Car start, the race began normally. After only a handful of laps were completed, Steven Ellery slid off the track at the Chase and beached his Falcon on a kerb, resulting in the first Safety Car of the day. Upon race resumption, Craig Lowndes passed both DJR cars to move into second.

Tony Longhurst had started the race in seventh but spun out of the penultimate corner, and having pitted to check for damage came out in 52nd. Newly-crowned V8 Lites champion Dean Canto was tackling his second Bathurst 1000 aboard a self-run ex-Paul Weel Racing Falcon, but his campaign was curtailed early with power steering issues.

The leaders began to lap the backmarkers and Radisich mistimed a move on Shane Howison in the minnow South Pacific Motor Racing Commodore, clipping the front-left and sustaining minor damage. Another privateer, Rod Nash, brought out the second Safety Car inside 15 laps having stopped at the Cutting with a radiator full of mud – the Commodore driver had gone off in the Chase less than a lap prior.

Nash's team-mate Cameron McConville almost made it double-trouble for the team after the restart, as he was tagged by Mick Donaher on the exit of the Chase and made a trip through the gravel trap. Greg Ritter and Peter Doulman were not so lucky a few laps later; Ritter had bombed down the inside of the Colourscan Racing Falcon at the Chase and hit Doulman, resulting in both getting stuck in the mud and a third Safety Car. Both drivers returned to the circuit with assistance, but the Ritter and co-driver Tim Leahey's day in the second Garry Rogers Motorsport Commodore was over having overheated. Both DJR Falcons took the opportunity for an early stop, with Brad Jones Racing gambling on slick tyres for Tomas Mezera.

The Jones' move looked to be the right one as the circuit dried out after the restart. Cameron McLean was now aboard the #17 and nearly blotted his copybook by clouting the wall at Quarry Corner. Lowndes passed Gardner for the lead as the pit-stop cycle continued, with DJR making a second stop for slicks. The rear bumper on Rod Salmon's Falcon flew off as he made his first stop.

As drivers adapted to slicks, a number of drivers went off. Both Rodney Forbes and Yvan Muller had excursions through the mud at the Chase, as did Ryan McLeod in the Chiko car at Hell Corner. McLeod rejoined around debutant James Brock, who ran wide and perilously close to the wall at Griffins Bend seconds later.

After his co-drivers' incident in the Chase earlier in the week, Ross Halliday's weekend was finished off after Forbes turned him into the inside wall at Forrest's Elbow, bringing out another Safety Car. Perkins alleged that Greg Murphy had passed him under yellow flags, but no penalty was forthcoming and the Kiwi was held up by Steve Owen over Skyline on the restart.

Then all hell broke loose. Neal Bates in the former race-leading Gardner car was punted off at McPhillamy Park by Greg Crick, the Tasmanian having attempted a pass. Simultaneously, Anthony Tratt ran up the back of McLeod under the bridge at pit entry and pushed the Commodore into the outside wall. Bates returned to the circuit for the restart, but pulled off at the paddock entry gate on Mountain Straight with clutch failure.

The rain returned around lap 50, but was restricted to a drizzle over the top of the mountain. Murphy brought his Gibson Motorsport Commodore in with overheating issues – hoses and buckets of water were poured over the Holden V8 in an attempt to cool it down and returned to the circuit.

The battle for third between Perkins, Alain Menu and Neil Crompton closed up, with Ellery trying to unlap himself in the process. Having passed Menu, Ellery then spun into the tyres at Forrest's Elbow. Greg Crick dropped a wheel off the edge of the circuit at the exit of Hell Corner, pirouetting multiple times and getting bogged in the infield whilst trying to turn around. Veteran privateers Steve Reed and Trevor Ashby retired from the race with a hole in the radiator.

The Lansvale Smash Repairs team then suffered another setback as Phillip Scifleet in the second car spun through the run-off at the Chase, caking his Commodore in mud. Simultaneously, Doulman spun his Commodore on the entry to Sulman Park, but kept the car off the wall – and with the combination of those two plus Greg Crick, the Safety Car had to come out. Larkham Motorsport foreshadowed the caution and brought Menu in for a brake change, the first of the race.

Out-of-contract Crompton seized the initiative on the restart, passing Perkins for third. The move proved well-timed as Jason Plato in the second Holden Racing Team Commodore became the latest victim of the mud at the Chase a lap later, necessitating another Safety Car. Following Menu's lead, both DJR cars and Paul Morris pitted for brakes.

Morris' strategy play was then bungled on the restart after the Sieders' father-and-son entry tangled with him on the run up Mountain Straight, the privateer Falcon spinning into the inside wall. Whilst the car was far enough off the circuit to keep the race green, the respite only lasted a lap before Queenslander Ian Moncrieff ended his and Dean Canto's already troubled day by hitting the wall on the outside of Hell Corner. Skaife and Tander took the opportunity to fit new brakes, elevating Crompton to the lead.

Ellery unlapped himself from second-placed Perkins when the race resumed. Despite his earlier incident with McLeod, Tratt had crept into the top 5 and then passed Menu at Murrays Corner for P4. Brett Peters in the Colourscan car then blew a tyre entering the Chase, and Rodney Crick hit the wall at Forrest's Elbow in the Imrie Motorsport Commodore having made side-to-side contact with Tander as the GRM driver lapped him.

Matthew White was the next driver to get bogged at the Chase, requiring another Safety Car. Crompton and Perkins made their second stops, but Ellery could not capitalise as he was forced to come in a number of laps earlier – ending his chances of returning to the lead lap. Menu and Mark Larkham's strong run ended prematurely with a power steering fluid leak.

Murphy now led the race from Nathan Pretty in the Holden Young Lions car, but the latter was immediately shuffled back by Radisich and stablemate Lowndes – the latter making a risky dive at Murrays Corner. Lowndes then pushes on and passes Radisich down Conrod Straight. Longhurst, fighting back from his earlier spin, lunged down the inside of Glenn Seton at Hell Corner but ran wide and lost a position to the second Lansvale car.

Rodney Forbes became another driver to spin under the bridge on pit entry, but continued on. Pretty continued to sink through the field, falling to ninth before making a stop. Larkham returned to the track, albeit 5 laps down.

Second half

Steve Johnson passed Brad Jones for fourth at halfway. A slew of mechanical issues then followed – Ingall brought his traditionally-bulletproof Perkins Engineering Commodore into the pits with engine issues, as did Paul Stokell in Ellery's Ford. The second Lansvale car also pitted with coolant thundering out.

Lowndes stormed past Murphy for the lead on lap 87, with Murphy making a stop on the same lap and handing over to Steven Richards. The defending winners received no respite from their overheating issues; the Kmart Commodore was allegedly running at 120°C and their dumping of water into the engine bay was attracting the ire of race control for potentially creating a safety hazard. Whilst the pit-lane was drenched, the circuit was the driest it had been all week as the rain had finally stopped.

Jason Bargwanna made a daring move on Brad Jones for fifth at Sulman Park after the OzEmail Falcon lost traction in a puddle. Jones made a scheduled stop at the end of the lap, handing back over to Mezera. The stop proved another well-timed one as Doulman's second spin at Sulman Park wasn't as fortunate as the last, heavily clouting the concrete causing the races' 10th Safety Car. Johnson, Andrew Miedecke and Jim Richards all made pit-stops and driver changes under the caution.

Lowndes pulled away from the field when racing resumed. Radisich in second was held up by his compatriots in the Team Kiwi Racing Commodore, with Bargwanna and Seton closing up to him. Rain returned to the top of the mountain as the 100-lap mark approached, and a cautious Yvan Muller was quickly monstered by McLean, Dugal McDougall, Tratt, John Bowe and Mezera. Radisich and Bargwanna then stopped, handing over to their respective co-drivers – but Tander in the Valvoline Commodore was able to adapt to cold slicks on a damp track faster than Jason Bright, rounding up the CART hopeful at Reid Park.

The rain increased, and Steven Richards passed Seton at the Chase for second – and was soon followed by McLean. McDougall, Bowe and Mezera engaged in an aggressive scrap for fifth; Bowe almost punting the Pepsi Commodore off at the Chase before Mezera slipped past the pair of them at Murrays.

Lowndes completed his last stint as a HRT driver and handed over to Skaife on lap 103 – despite the increase in rain, the circuit was still dry enough for slicks. Muller in the other HRT car cut across the Chase again whilst the Sieders family destroyed a splitter on the exit of Hell Corner; having already broken one inside the first 20 laps and with none left they were forced to complete the race with what they already had. Problems for the privateers persisted as Mal Rose came in with a puncture.

Jason Richards found the sandtrap at the Chase in the TKR car. A Safety Car was called and Seton pitted, handing over to Crompton and overcutting both Skaife and Tander. Steven Richards led but immediately came under attack from McLean; the DJR driver was blocked from making the move into Hell Corner but edged his way into the lead at Griffins Bend. Ingall, now three laps down, began assaulting the overheating Gibson car with Bowe in third closing up.

Crompton needed to make ground with Skaife pressuring him. The driver/commentator attempted to lap Matt Neal in Paul Morris' Commodore at the Chase, but was blocked and lost ground – a lap later, he lunged past Neal at Murrays. The Briton, unimpressed by his treatment, then cut across the track and bombed down the inside of the Falcon at Hell Corner, causing Skaife to swerve out of the way and tag Crompton into a spin. The factory Ford lost its front bumper having run over the pit exit bollards, whilst Skaife drove away with a rubbing right-rear tyre. Tander, who had been following closely behind, had managed to just evade the mess and overtake both.

The rain was now starting to fall heavier. John Faulkner ran wide briefly on the exit of Hell Corner. Crompton, having already lost significant time bringing his Falcon back to the pits, chose to fit wet tyres along with a new front bar. Bowe meanwhile lost his right-rear wheel altogether coming into McPhillamy Park, but managed to complete the lap and fit a replacement.

The aftermath of the Neal incident continued to unravel as Skaife's rubbing tyre shredded and took the sill panel with it. Having stopped to rectify the damage, the HRT Commodore was back in the lane two laps later for wet tyres as the circuit became soaked across the top – and shortly after he was followed by the leaders. The Safety Car then came out for the twelfth time as several cars fell foul of the conditions. Yvan Muller became bogged in the mud-pit at the Chase and was joined by the second Sieders car of Robert Russell and Steve Coulter, whilst Neil Schembri had aquaplaned off the top of the mountain into the sandtrap at the Esses. Despite all his earlier dramas, Longhurst was now sitting third – but a brief fuel fire when he made his stop for wets was yet another unneeded setback for the Stone Brothers Racing crew.

The Safety Car stayed out for an extended period to clear the stuck cars. DJR brought both cars in to put their regular drivers back behind the wheel. When the race returned to green, Matt Neal was brought in to serve a 60-second stop-go penalty for causing the incident at Hell Corner. Tander now led the race with championship rival Skaife caught nearly a lap down – but the HRT drivers' task was made easier when Menu became yet another victim of the muddy quagmire at the Chase, causing the races' thirteenth Safety Car.

The race restarted with 33 laps remaining. Tander led Longhurst, Todd Kelly in the Young Lions entry, Murphy and Christian Murchison running a remarkable fifth on debut in the second Perkins car. Kelly attacked Longhurst entering Hell Corner, but the 1988 winner took the hurry-along and passed a tentative Tander for the lead at Griffins Bend. Due to the earlier fire however, Longhurst would need to make another stop whereas the others were touch-and-go.

Murchison and co-driver Luke Youlden's dream run came to an abrupt halt with a broken rocker arm, yet another mechanical failure for the reliable Perkins team. Drama for the young guns continued as Kelly locked the rear brakes and spun his Commodore at Murrays Corner, allowing Murphy onto the podium. Muller spun Faulkner at Hell Corner not long after.

The rain stopped and the track began to dry again. Brad Jones passed Darren Hossack in the second Gibson Commodore for fifth before Radisich and Johnson blew by the pair of them having restarted eighth and ninth. Alan Jones in the Paul Little Racing Falcon started having throttle sensor issues in 14th and ultimately retired from the race not long after.

Rose stopped on the exit of the Cutting as a dry line emerged. DJR, gambling on a Safety Car, brought both cars in for slicks. Rose managed to get going again, but the already rapid pace of the Shell Falcons had improved with the change to slicks and the rest of the field took their lead – a get-out-of-jail-free scenario for Longhurst and rookie co-driver David Besnard. Tander and Murphy attempted the overcut on the field by staying out a lap longer, but were unsuccessful – Murphy beating Tander out of the pits for second.

Lap times began to tumble as the slicks bedded in. Hossack and McDougall stayed out banking on track position and more rain, but their wet tyres couldn't handle the developing conditions and both made late stops – costing them significant time. Tander then passed Murphy for second with 17 laps to go; the Gibson car unable to put up a fight after its race-long overheating issues.

Craig Harris and Stephen Voight retired with an engine failure just over 100km from the finish. Radisich was setting 2:16 lap times and was rapidly catching Murphy, but the Kiwi-Croat spun Jason Richards around at Forrest's Elbow. 'The Rat' escaped unscathed and thundered past Murphy not long after, whilst Richards was left to complete a risky three-point turn before continuing. Having earlier lost his right-rear wheel, Bowe then lost his left-rear wheel after the rear suspension in the PAE Motorsport Falcon collapsed with just over 10 laps to go.

Disaster struck Longhurst with the finish in sight. Approaching Forrest's Elbow, he attempted to lap Adam Macrow but clouted the John Faulkner Racing Commodore, breaking the front-right suspension arms on impact and limping back to the pits where his race would end. Tander inherited the lead with 9 laps to go, but had Radisich five seconds behind and bearing down on him fast. Murphy was now back on the podium, but had Radisich's team-mate Johnson closing in at a rapid rate of knots. With just 2 laps to go, Brad Jones was forced to retire from eighth with suspension failure and a puncture.

Having stabilised the gap through traffic in the closing laps, Tander took victory by just over two seconds ahead of Radisich. It was the first Bathurst win for the West Australian, co-driver Bargwanna and team owner Garry Rogers in his long history as both a team owner and a driver. Murphy managed to drag his beleaguered Commodore to third less than a second ahead of Johnson, with the Holden Young Lions the leading factory Holden. Having only needed to finish 17th or better, Skaife claimed his third Australian Touring Car/V8 Supercar title in sixth-place with departing team-mate Lowndes.

== Results ==
=== Pre-qualifying ===
Pos.	No.	Driver	Team	Car	Time	Gap
1	75	(Australia) Anthony Tratt (Australia) Alan Jones	Paul Little Racing	Ford Falcon AU	2:43.7459	
2	59	(Australia) Layton Crambrook (Australia) Gary Baxter	John Scotcher Motorsport	Ford Falcon EL	2:48.9927	+5.2468
3	55	(Australia) Rod Nash (Australia) Paul Dumbrell	Rod Nash Racing	Holden Commodore VT	2:50.3167	+6.5708
4	61	(Australia) Ross Halliday (Australia) Adam Wallis	Halliday Motorsport	Ford Falcon EL	2:50.4253	+6.6794
5	25	(Australia) Terry Wyhoon (Australia) James Brock	Terry Wyhoon Racing	Holden Commodore VS	2:50.6572	+6.9113
6	24	(Australia) Paul Romano (Australia) David Parsons	Romano Racing	Holden Commodore VS	2:51.1278	+7.3819
7	42	(Australia) Bill Sieders (Australia) Luke Sieders	Sieders Racing Team	Ford Falcon EL	2:51.2832	+7.5373
8	500	(Australia) Alan Heath (Australia) Terry Finnigan	Power Racing	Ford Falcon AU	2:52.1290	+8.3831
9	38	(Australia) Peter Field (Australia) Shane Howison	South Pacific Motor Racing	Holden Commodore VS	2:52.3176	+8.5717
10	150	(Australia) Dean Lindstrom (Australia) Melinda Price	Clive Wiseman Racing	Holden Commodore VS	2:52.3340	+8.5881
11	37	(Australia) Bill Attard (Australia) Roger Hurd	Alan Taylor Racing	Holden Commodore VS	2:53.5905	+9.8446
12	87	(Australia) Rod Salmon (Australia) Damien White	Rod Salmon Racing	Ford Falcon AU	2:53.8950	+10.1491
13	14	(Australia) Rodney Crick (Australia) Peter Gazzard	Imrie Motorsport	Holden Commodore VT	2:55.6008	+11.8549
14	67	(Australia) Owen Kelly (Australia) Aaron McGill	Paul Morris Motorsport	Holden Commodore VS	2:55.7187	+11.9728
15	36	(Australia) Neil Schembri (Australia) Gary Quartly	Schembri Motorsport	Ford Falcon EL	2:56.2165	+12.4706
16	26	(Australia) Peter Doulman (Australia) John Cotter	Doulman Automotive	Holden Commodore VT	2:56.9635	+13.2176
17	56	(Australia) Robert Russell (Australia) Steve Coulter	Sieders Racing Team	Ford Falcon EL	3:01.1603	+17.4144
NC	57	(New Zealand) Chris Butler (New Zealand) Miles Pope	Trevor Crittenden Motorsport	Holden Commodore VS	No time	

=== Qualifying ===
Pos.	No.	Driver	Team	Car	Time	Gap	Grid
1	1	(Australia) Craig Lowndes (Australia) Mark Skaife	Holden Racing Team	Holden Commodore VT	2:11.8882		Top 10
2	18	(New Zealand) Paul Radisich (Australia) Jason Bright	Dick Johnson Racing	Ford Falcon AU	2:12.0199	+0.1317	Top 10
3	5	(Australia) Glenn Seton (Australia) Neil Crompton	Glenn Seton Racing	Ford Falcon AU	2:12.3622	+0.4740	Top 10
4	11	(Australia) Larry Perkins (Australia) Russell Ingall	Perkins Engineering	Holden Commodore VT	2:12.4849	+0.5967	Top 10
5	10	(Australia) Mark Larkham (Switzerland) Alain Menu	Larkham Motor Sport	Ford Falcon AU	2:12.7625	+0.8743	Top 10
6	34	(Australia) Garth Tander (Australia) Jason Bargwanna	Garry Rogers Motorsport	Holden Commodore VT	2:13.1178	+1.2296	Top 10
7	9	(Australia) Tony Longhurst (Australia) David Besnard	Stone Brothers Racing	Ford Falcon AU	2:13.3641	+1.4759	Top 10
8	6	(Australia) Wayne Gardner (Australia) Neal Bates	Glenn Seton Racing	Ford Falcon AU	2:13.4912	+1.6030	Top 10
9	15	(Australia) Nathan Pretty (Australia) Todd Kelly	Holden Young Lions	Holden Commodore VT	2:13.6966	+1.8084	Top 10
10	17	(Australia) Steven Johnson (Australia) Cameron McLean	Dick Johnson Racing	Ford Falcon AU	2:13.6996	+1.8114	Top 10
11	7	(New Zealand) Steven Richards (New Zealand) Greg Murphy	Gibson Motorsport	Holden Commodore VT	2:13.7709	+1.8827	11
12	31	(Australia) Steven Ellery (Australia) Paul Stokell	Steven Ellery Racing	Ford Falcon AU	2:14.1244	+2.2362	12
13	600	(Australia) John Bowe (New Zealand) Jim Richards	Briggs Motor Sport	Ford Falcon AU	2:14.5771	+2.6889	13
14	50	(Australia) Mick Donaher (Australia) Tyler Mecklem	Clive Wiseman Racing	Holden Commodore VT	2:14.7435	+2.8553	14
15	43	(Australia) Paul Weel (Australia) Greg Crick	Paul Weel Racing	Ford Falcon AU	2:14.8718	+2.9836	15
16	46	(New Zealand) John Faulkner (Australia) Adam Macrow	John Faulkner Racing	Holden Commodore VT	2:15.1435	+3.2553	16
17	75	(Australia) Anthony Tratt (Australia) Alan Jones	Paul Little Racing	Ford Falcon AU	2:15.2048	+3.3166	17
18	29	(Australia) Paul Morris (United Kingdom) Matt Neal	Paul Morris Motorsport	Holden Commodore VT	2:15.4033	+3.5151	18
19	2	(United Kingdom) Jason Plato (France) Yvan Muller	Holden Racing Team	Holden Commodore VT	2:15.4351	+3.5469	19
20	21	(Australia) Brad Jones (Australia) Tomas Mezera	Brad Jones Racing	Ford Falcon AU	2:15.4489	+3.5607	20
21	4	(New Zealand) Craig Baird (New Zealand) Simon Wills	Stone Brothers Racing	Ford Falcon AU	2:15.5720	+3.6838	21
22	28	(Australia) Rodney Forbes (United Kingdom) John Cleland	Gibson Motorsport	Holden Commodore VT	2:15.5884	+3.7002	22
23	777	(New Zealand) Jason Richards (New Zealand) Angus Fogg	Team Kiwi Racing	Holden Commodore VT	2:15.6158	+3.7276	23
24	500	(Australia) Alan Heath (Australia) Terry Finnigan	Power Racing	Ford Falcon AU	2:15.8337	+3.9455	24
25	16	(Australia) Dugal McDougall (Australia) Andrew Miedecke	McDougall Motorsport	Holden Commodore VT	2:16.0424	+4.1542	25
26	22	(Australia) Rick Bates (Australia) Brett Peters	Colourscan Racing	Ford Falcon AU	2:16.4073	+4.5191	26
27	12	(Australia) David Parsons (Australia) Darren Hossack	Gibson Motorsport	Holden Commodore VT	2:16.4255	+4.5373	27
28	76	(Australia) Matthew White (Australia) Steve Owen	MW Motorsport	Holden Commodore VS	2:16.8056	+4.9174	28
29	3	(Australia) Steve Reed (Australia) Trevor Ashby	Lansvale Smash Repairs	Holden Commodore VS	2:17.1166	+5.2284	29
30	35	(Australia) Greg Ritter (Australia) Tim Leahey	Garry Rogers Motorsport	Holden Commodore VT	2:17.2494	+5.3612	30
31	45	(Australia) Dean Canto (Australia) Ian Moncrieff	Dean Canto Racing	Ford Falcon AU	2:17.6959	+5.8077	31
32	96	(Australia) Ryan McLeod (Australia) Wayne Wakefield	John Faulkner Racing	Holden Commodore VS	2:18.2597	+6.3715	32
33	24	(Australia) Paul Romano (Australia) David Parsons	Romano Racing	Holden Commodore VS	2:18.3525	+6.4643	33
34	14	(Australia) Rodney Crick (Australia) Peter Gazzard	Imrie Motorsport	Holden Commodore VT	2:19.5258	+7.6376	34
35	20	(Australia) Garry Holt (Australia) Garry Willmington	Emerzidis Motorsport	Ford Falcon EL	2:19.6253	+7.7371	35
36	44	(Australia) Mal Rose (Australia) Christian D'Agostin	Mal Rose Racing	Holden Commodore VS	2:19.6271	+7.7389	36
37	26	(Australia) Peter Doulman (Australia) John Cotter	Doulman Automotive	Holden Commodore VT	2:19.6562	+7.7680	37
38	23	(Australia) Geoff Full (Australia) Phillip Scifleet	Lansvale Smash Repairs	Holden Commodore VS	2:19.8347	+7.9465	38
39	59	(Australia) Layton Crambrook (Australia) Gary Baxter	John Scotcher Motorsport	Ford Falcon EL	2:19.8408	+7.9526	39
40	8	(Australia) Luke Youlden (Singapore) Christian Murchison	Perkins Engineering	Holden Commodore VT	2:19.9278	+8.0396	40
41	87	(Australia) Rod Salmon (Australia) Damien White	Rod Salmon Racing	Ford Falcon AU	2:20.4178	+8.5296	41
42	30	(Australia) Craig Harris (Australia) Stephen Voight	Harris Racing	Ford Falcon AU	2:20.6861	+8.7979	42
43	25	(Australia) Terry Wyhoon (Australia) James Brock	Terry Wyhoon Racing	Holden Commodore VS	2:21.4219	+9.5337	43
44	55	(Australia) Rod Nash (Australia) Paul Dumbrell	Rod Nash Racing	Holden Commodore VT	2:21.4277	+9.5395	44
45	97	(Australia) Tim Sipp (Australia) Shane Beikoff	Graphic Skills Racing	Holden Commodore VS	2:21.4616	+9.5734	45
46	36	(Australia) Neil Schembri (Australia) Gary Quartly	Schembri Motorsport	Ford Falcon EL	2:21.7017	+9.8135	46
47	42	(Australia) Bill Sieders (Australia) Luke Sieders	Sieders Racing Team	Ford Falcon EL	2:21.7933	+9.9051	47
48	77	(Australia) Richard Mork (Australia) Steve Williams	V8 Racing	Holden Commodore VS	2:22.1072	+10.2190	48
49	61	(Australia) Ross Halliday (Australia) Adam Wallis	Halliday Motorsport	Ford Falcon EL	2:23.1511	+11.2629	49
50	37	(Australia) Bill Attard (Australia) Roger Hurd	Alan Taylor Racing	Holden Commodore VS	2:24.0178	+12.1296	50
51	67	(Australia) Owen Kelly (Australia) Aaron McGill	Paul Morris Motorsport	Holden Commodore VS	2:24.4421	+12.5539	51
52	54	(Australia) Cameron McConville (Australia) Geoff Brabham	Rod Nash Racing	Holden Commodore VT	2:26.7724	+14.8842	52
53	56	(Australia) Robert Russell (Australia) Steve Coulter	Sieders Racing Team	Ford Falcon EL	2:31.3477	+19.4595	53
DSQ	38	(Australia) Peter Field (Australia) Shane Howison	South Pacific Motor Racing	Holden Commodore VS	–		54
NC	150	(Australia) Dean Lindstrom (Australia) Melinda Price	Clive Wiseman Racing	Holden Commodore VS	No time		55
DNPQ	57	(New Zealand) Chris Butler (New Zealand) Miles Pope	Trevor Crittenden Motorsport	Holden Commodore VS			DNPQ

=== Top ten shootout ===
Pos	No	Driver	Team	Car	Time
Pole	6	(Australia) Wayne Gardner	Glenn Seton Racing	Ford Falcon AU	2:28.3844
2	17	(Australia) Steven Johnson	Dick Johnson Racing	Ford Falcon AU	2:29.6150
3	1	(Australia) Mark Skaife	Holden Racing Team	Holden Commodore VT	2:30.6720
4	10	(Australia) Mark Larkham	Larkham Motor Sport	Ford Falcon AU	2:31.6161
5	18	(New Zealand) Paul Radisich	Dick Johnson Racing	Ford Falcon AU	2:32.2009
6	5	(Australia) Glenn Seton	Glenn Seton Racing	Ford Falcon AU	2:32.8572
7	9	(Australia) Tony Longhurst	Stone Brothers Racing	Ford Falcon AU	2:33.3617
8	15	(Australia) Todd Kelly	Holden Young Lions	Holden Commodore VT	2:37.3280
9	11	(Australia) Russell Ingall	Perkins Engineering	Holden Commodore VT	2:43.5516
10	34	(Australia) Garth Tander	Garry Rogers Motorsport	Holden Commodore VT	2:55.7286

=== Starting grid ===
Inside row					Outside row				
1	(Australia) Wayne Gardner (Australia) Neal Bates	6			17	(Australia) Steven Johnson (Australia) Cameron McLean			2
1	Glenn Seton Racing (Ford Falcon AU)				Dick Johnson Racing (Ford Falcon AU)				2
3			(Australia) Craig Lowndes (Australia) Mark Skaife	1			10	(Australia) Mark Larkham (Switzerland) Alain Menu	4
3			Holden Racing Team (Holden Commodore VT)				Larkham Motor Sport (Ford Falcon AU)		4
5	(New Zealand) Paul Radisich (Australia) Jason Bright	18			5	(Australia) Glenn Seton (Australia) Neil Crompton			6
5	Dick Johnson Racing (Ford Falcon AU)				Glenn Seton Racing (Ford Falcon AU)				6
7			(Australia) Tony Longhurst (Australia) David Besnard	9			15	(Australia) Nathan Pretty (Australia) Todd Kelly	8
7			Stone Brothers Racing (Ford Falcon AU)				Holden Young Lions (Holden Commodore VT)		8
9	(Australia) Larry Perkins (Australia) Russell Ingall	11			34	(Australia) Garth Tander (Australia) Jason Bargwanna			10
9	Perkins Engineering (Holden Commodore VT)				Garry Rogers Motorsport (Holden Commodore VT)				10
11			(New Zealand) Steven Richards (New Zealand) Greg Murphy	7			31	(Australia) Steven Ellery (Australia) Paul Stokell	12
11			Gibson Motorsport (Holden Commodore VT)				Steven Ellery Racing (Ford Falcon AU)		12
13	(Australia) John Bowe (New Zealand) Jim Richards	600			50	(Australia) Mick Donaher (Australia) Tyler Mecklem			14
13	Briggs Motor Sport (Ford Falcon AU)				Clive Wiseman Racing (Holden Commodore VT)				14
15			(Australia) Paul Weel (Australia) Greg Crick	43			46	(New Zealand) John Faulkner (Australia) Adam Macrow	16
15			Paul Weel Racing (Ford Falcon AU)				John Faulkner Racing (Holden Commodore VT)		16
17	(Australia) Anthony Tratt (Australia) Alan Jones	75			29	(Australia) Paul Morris (United Kingdom) Matt Neal			18
17	Paul Little Racing (Ford Falcon AU)				Paul Morris Motorsport (Holden Commodore VT)				18
19			(United Kingdom) Jason Plato (France) Yvan Muller	2			21	(Australia) Brad Jones (Australia) Tomas Mezera	20
19			Holden Racing Team (Holden Commodore VT)				Brad Jones Racing (Ford Falcon AU)		20
21	(New Zealand) Craig Baird (New Zealand) Simon Wills	4			28	(Australia) Rodney Forbes (United Kingdom) John Cleland			22
21	Stone Brothers Racing (Ford Falcon AU)				Gibson Motorsport (Holden Commodore VT)				22
23			(New Zealand) Jason Richards (New Zealand) Angus Fogg	777			500	(Australia) Alan Heath (Australia) Terry Finnigan	24
23			Team Kiwi Racing (Holden Commodore VT)				Power Racing (Ford Falcon AU)		24
25	(Australia) Dugal McDougall (Australia) Andrew Miedecke	16			22	(Australia) Rick Bates (Australia) Brett Peters			26
25	McDougall Motorsport (Holden Commodore VT)				Colourscan Racing (Ford Falcon AU)				26
27			(Australia) David Parsons (Australia) Darren Hossack	12			76	(Australia) Matthew White (Australia) Steve Owen	28
27			Gibson Motorsport (Holden Commodore VT)				MW Motorsport (Holden Commodore VS)		28
29	(Australia) Steve Reed (Australia) Trevor Ashby	3			35	(Australia) Greg Ritter (Australia) Tim Leahey			30
29	Lansvale Smash Repairs (Holden Commodore VS)				Garry Rogers Motorsport (Holden Commodore VT)				30
31			(Australia) Dean Canto (Australia) Ian Moncrieff	45			96	(Australia) Ryan McLeod (Australia) Wayne Wakefield	32
31			Dean Canto Racing (Ford Falcon AU)				John Faulkner Racing (Holden Commodore VS)		32
33	(Australia) Paul Romano (Australia) David Parsons	24			14	(Australia) Rodney Crick (Australia) Peter Gazzard			34
33	Romano Racing (Holden Commodore VS)				Imrie Motorsport (Holden Commodore VT)				34
35			(Australia) Garry Holt (Australia) Garry Willmington	20			44	(Australia) Mal Rose (Australia) Christian D'Agostin	36
35			Emerzidis Motorsport (Ford Falcon EL)				Mal Rose Racing (Holden Commodore VS)		36
37	(Australia) Peter Doulman (Australia) John Cotter	26			23	(Australia) Geoff Full (Australia) Phillip Scifleet			38
37	Doulman Automotive (Holden Commodore VT)				Lansvale Smash Repairs (Holden Commodore VS)				38
39			(Australia) Layton Crambrook (Australia) Gary Baxter	59			8	(Australia) Luke Youlden (Singapore) Christian Murchison	40
39			John Scotcher Motorsport (Ford Falcon EL)				Perkins Engineering (Holden Commodore VT)		40
41	(Australia) Rod Salmon (Australia) Damien White	87			30	(Australia) Craig Harris (Australia) Stephen Voight			42
41	Rod Salmon Racing (Ford Falcon AU)				Harris Racing (Ford Falcon AU)				42
43			(Australia) Terry Wyhoon (Australia) James Brock	25			55	(Australia) Rod Nash (Australia) Paul Dumbrell	44
43			Terry Wyhoon Racing (Holden Commodore VS)				Rod Nash Racing (Holden Commodore VT)		44
45	(Australia) Tim Sipp (Australia) Shane Beikoff	97			36	(Australia) Neil Schembri (Australia) Gary Quartly			46
45	Graphic Skills Racing (Holden Commodore VS)				Schembri Motorsport (Ford Falcon EL)				46
47			(Australia) Bill Sieders (Australia) Luke Sieders	42			77	(Australia) Richard Mork (Australia) Steve Williams	48
47			Sieders Racing Team (Ford Falcon EL)				V8 Racing (Holden Commodore VS)		48
49	(Australia) Ross Halliday (Australia) Adam Wallis	61			37	(Australia) Bill Attard (Australia) Roger Hurd			50
49	Halliday Motorsport (Ford Falcon EL)				Alan Taylor Racing (Holden Commodore VS)				50
51			(Australia) Owen Kelly (Australia) Aaron McGill	67			54	(Australia) Cameron McConville (Australia) Geoff Brabham	52
51			Paul Morris Motorsport (Holden Commodore VS)				Rod Nash Racing (Holden Commodore VT)		52
53	(Australia) Robert Russell (Australia) Steve Coulter	56			38	(Australia) Peter Field (Australia) Shane Howison			54
53	Sieders Racing Team (Ford Falcon EL)				South Pacific Motor Racing (Holden Commodore VS)				54
55			(Australia) Dean Lindstrom (Australia) Melinda Price	150					
55			Clive Wiseman Racing (Holden Commodore VS)						

=== Race ===
Pos	No	Drivers	Team	Car	Laps	Time/Retired	Grid	Points
1	34	(Australia) Garth Tander (Australia) Jason Bargwanna	Garry Rogers Motorsport	Holden Commodore VT	161	7:23:30.2348	10	240
2	18	(New Zealand) Paul Radisich (Australia) Jason Bright	Dick Johnson Racing	Ford Falcon AU	161	+2.4114	5	216
3	7	(New Zealand) Steven Richards (New Zealand) Greg Murphy	Gibson Motorsport	Holden Commodore VT	161	+5.1042	11	204
4	17	(Australia) Steven Johnson (Australia) Cameron McLean	Dick Johnson Racing	Ford Falcon AU	161	+5.7724	2	192
5	15	(Australia) Nathan Pretty (Australia) Todd Kelly	Holden Young Lions	Holden Commodore VT	161	+25.6738	8	180
6	1	(Australia) Craig Lowndes (Australia) Mark Skaife	Holden Racing Team	Holden Commodore VT	161	+59.4776	3	168
7	4	(New Zealand) Craig Baird (New Zealand) Simon Wills	Stone Brothers Racing	Ford Falcon AU	161	+1:15.7830	21	156
8	16	(Australia) Dugal McDougall (Australia) Andrew Miedecke	McDougall Motorsport	Holden Commodore VT	161	+2:06.2218	25	144
9	12	(Australia) David Parsons (Australia) Darren Hossack	Gibson Motorsport	Holden Commodore VT	161	+2:16.3715	27	132
10	2	(United Kingdom) Jason Plato (France) Yvan Muller	Holden Racing Team	Holden Commodore VT	159	+2 laps	19	120
11	11	(Australia) Russell Ingall (Australia) Larry Perkins	Perkins Engineering	Holden Commodore VT	159	+2 laps	9	108
12	29	(Australia) Paul Morris (United Kingdom) Matt Neal	Paul Morris Motorsport	Holden Commodore VT	158	+3 laps	18	96
13	5	(Australia) Glenn Seton (Australia) Neil Crompton	Glenn Seton Racing	Ford Falcon AU	158	+3 laps	6	84
14	43	(Australia) Paul Weel (Australia) Greg Crick	Paul Weel Racing	Ford Falcon AU	157	+4 laps	15	72
15	22	(Australia) Rick Bates (Australia) Brett Peters	Colourscan Racing	Ford Falcon AU	157	+4 laps	26	60
16	777	(New Zealand) Jason Richards (New Zealand) Angus Fogg	Team Kiwi Racing	Holden Commodore VT	157	+4 laps	23	48
17	87	(Australia) Rod Salmon (Australia) Damien White	Rod Salmon Racing	Ford Falcon AU	155	+6 laps	41	36
18	10	(Australia) Mark Larkham (Switzerland) Alain Menu	Larkham Motor Sport	Ford Falcon AU	154	+7 laps	4	24
19	97	(Australia) Tim Sipp (Australia) Shane Beikoff	Graphic Skills Racing	Holden Commodore VS	153	+8 laps	45	12
20	150	(Australia) Dean Lindstrom (Australia) Melinda Price	Clive Wiseman Racing	Holden Commodore VS	150	+11 laps	55	6
21	38	(Australia) Peter Field (Australia) Shane Howison	South Pacific Motor Racing	Holden Commodore VS	149	+12 laps	54	
22	36	(Australia) Neil Schembri (Australia) Gary Quartly	Schembri Motorsport	Ford Falcon EL	147	+14 laps	46	
23	56	(Australia) Robert Russell (Australia) Steve Coulter	Sieders Racing Team	Ford Falcon EL	144	+17 laps	53	
24	76	(Australia) Matthew White (Australia) Steve Owen	MW Motorsport	Holden Commodore VS	143	+18 laps	28	
25	44	(Australia) Mal Rose (Australia) Christian D'Agostin	Mal Rose Racing	Holden Commodore VS	141	+20 laps	36	
26	42	(Australia) Bill Sieders (Australia) Luke Sieders	Sieders Racing Team	Ford Falcon EL	137	+24 laps	47	
27	14	(Australia) Rodney Crick (Australia) Peter Gazzard	Imrie Motorsport	Holden Commodore VT	137	+24 laps	34	
28	59	(Australia) Layton Crambrook (Australia) Gary Baxter	John Scotcher Motorsport	Ford Falcon EL	133	+28 laps	39	
29	77	(Australia) Richard Mork (Australia) Steve Williams	V8 Racing	Holden Commodore VS	127	+34 laps	48	
NC	20	(Australia) Garry Holt (Australia) Garry Willmington	Emerzidis Motorsport	Ford Falcon EL	116	+45 laps	35	
DNF	21	(Australia) Brad Jones (Australia) Tomas Mezera	Brad Jones Racing	Ford Falcon AU	159	Suspension	20	
DNF	46	(New Zealand) John Faulkner (Australia) Adam Macrow	John Faulkner Racing	Holden Commodore VT	154	Crash	16	
DNF	9	(Australia) Tony Longhurst (Australia) David Besnard	Stone Brothers Racing	Ford Falcon AU	151	Suspension	7	
DNF	75	(Australia) Anthony Tratt (Australia) Alan Jones	Paul Little Racing	Ford Falcon AU	150	Throttle sensor	17	
DNF	600	(Australia) John Bowe (New Zealand) Jim Richards	Briggs Motor Sport	Ford Falcon AU	147	Suspension	13	
DNF	30	(Australia) Craig Harris (Australia) Stephen Voight	Harris Racing	Ford Falcon AU	141	Engine	42	
DNF	8	(Australia) Luke Youlden (Singapore) Christian Murchison	Perkins Engineering	Holden Commodore VT	128	Engine	40	
DNF	54	(Australia) Cameron McConville (Australia) Geoff Brabham	Rod Nash Racing	Holden Commodore VT	105	Engine / overheating	52	
DNF	50	(Australia) Mick Donaher (Australia) Tyler Mecklem	Clive Wiseman Racing	Holden Commodore VT	105	Engine / overheating	14	
DNF	23	(Australia) Geoff Full (Australia) Phillip Scifleet	Lansvale Smash Repairs	Holden Commodore VS	89	Engine / overheating	38	
DNF	26	(Australia) Peter Doulman (Australia) John Cotter	Doulman Automotive	Holden Commodore VT	87	Crash	37	
DNF	31	(Australia) Steven Ellery (Australia) Paul Stokell	Steven Ellery Racing	Ford Falcon AU	82	Overheating	12	
DNF	37	(Australia) Roger Hurd (Australia) Bill Attard	Alan Taylor Racing	Holden Commodore VS	81	Engine	50	
DNF	28	(Australia) Rodney Forbes (United Kingdom) John Cleland	Gibson Motorsport	Holden Commodore VT	78	Crash	22	
DNF	25	(Australia) Terry Wyhoon (Australia) James Brock	Terry Wyhoon Racing	Holden Commodore VS	72	Steering	43	
DNF	45	(Australia) Dean Canto (Australia) Ian Moncrieff	Dean Canto Racing	Ford Falcon AU	56	Power Steering	31	
DNF	6	(Australia) Wayne Gardner (Australia) Neal Bates	Glenn Seton Racing	Ford Falcon AU	45	Clutch	1	
DNF	96	(Australia) Ryan McLeod (Australia) Wayne Wakefield	John Faulkner Racing	Holden Commodore VS	42	Crash	32	
DNF	35	(Australia) Greg Ritter (Australia) Tim Leahey	Garry Rogers Motorsport	Holden Commodore VT	40	Overheating	30	
DNF	3	(Australia) Steve Reed (Australia) Trevor Ashby	Lansvale Smash Repairs	Holden Commodore VS	39	Engine	29	
DNF	61	(Australia) Ross Halliday (Australia) Adam Wallis	Halliday Motorsport	Ford Falcon EL	38	Crash	49	
DNF	24	(Australia) Paul Romano (Australia) David Parsons	Romano Racing	Holden Commodore VS	23	Gearbox	33	
DNF	55	(Australia) Rod Nash (Australia) Paul Dumbrell	Rod Nash Racing	Holden Commodore VT	13	Clutch	44	
DNF	67	(Australia) Owen Kelly (Australia) Aaron McGill	Paul Morris Motorsport	Holden Commodore VS	2	Suspension	51	
DNS	500	(Australia) Alan Heath (Australia) Terry Finnigan	Power Racing	Ford Falcon AU		Engine Failure in Warm-Up	24	
DNPQ	57	(New Zealand) Chris Butler (New Zealand) Miles Pope	Trevor Crittenden Motorsport	Holden Commodore VS		Did Not Pre-Qualify		

== Broadcast ==
Network 10 broadcast the race for the fourth consecutive year, dating back to the 1997 5.0L race. Barry Sheene provided commentary in the booth for the first part of the race before moving to pit-lane for the remainder.

Network 10
Host: Bill Woods
Booth: Greg Rust, Mark Oastler, Barry Sheene
Pit-lane: Grant Denyer

As part of the iminent switch to digital television in 2001, Network 10 trialed separate digital channels of the race with Leigh Diffey and Mark Howard as part of the coverage.

== Statistics ==
- Provisional Pole Position - #1 Mark Skaife - 2:11.8882
- Pole Position - #6 Wayne Gardner - 2:28.3844
- Fastest Lap - #1 Craig Lowndes - 2:14.2602
- Average Speed - 135 km/h
