= Russell Ingall =

Australian racing driver

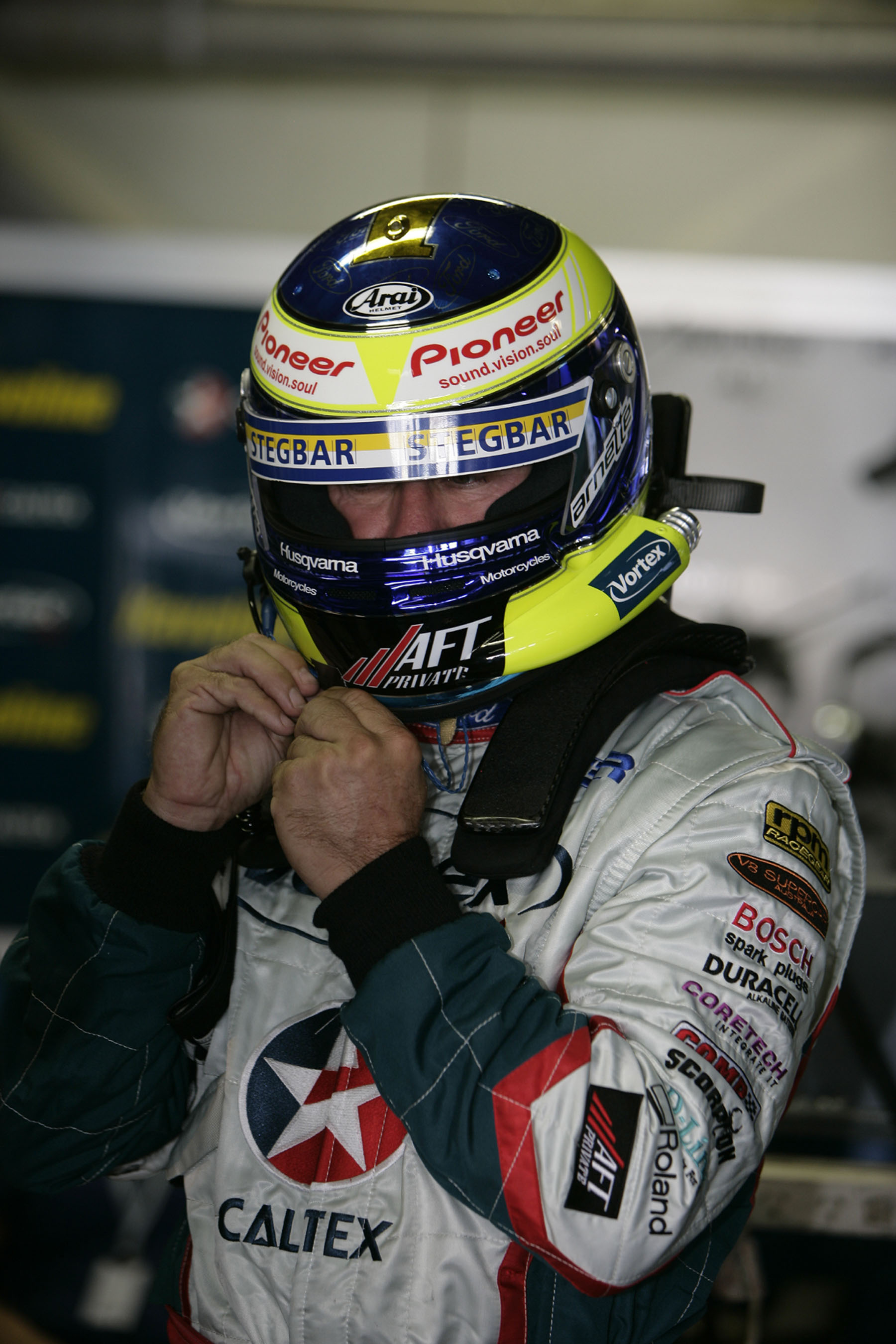
- Ingall in 2005
- Nationality: Australian
- Born: Russell Peter Ingall; 24 February 1964 (age 62) London, England

Supercars Championship career
- Championships: 1 (2005)
- Races: 588
- Wins: 27
- Podiums: 91
- Pole positions: 3
- 2005 position: 1st (1922 pts)

Russell Peter Ingall (born 24 February 1964 in London, England) is a former full-time Australian V8 Supercar driver. He won his V8 Supercars title in 2005, and finished second in 1998, 1999, 2001 and 2004. Ingall has also won the Bathurst 1000, in 1995 and 1997. His particular driving style earned him the nickname "Enforcer".

== Early years ==
Ingall was born in England and moved to Port Adelaide in South Australia with his parents at the age of three. His father was a motor mechanic and operated a service station, his mother died from breast cancer at a young age.

Ingall began his motor racing career at the age of 12, competing at the Whyalla go-kart track in South Australia. After winning an Australian Junior and several Senior karting Championships, he moved overseas to race karts in Europe before making the transition into Formula Ford. During his karting career, he lost his right-index finger at the first joint in an accident, however this didn't affect his racing.

Competing in only his second Formula Ford event, Ingall finished third in a support race at the 1988 Australian Grand Prix in Adelaide. Over the next few years Ingall proved to be a force in the Motorcraft Formula Ford Driver to Europe Series finishing runner-up before claiming the crown in the 1990. In 1990, he co-drove a Bob Forbes Racing Holden Commodore VL at the Bathurst 1000 with Kevin Bartlett

Ingall headed to Europe in 1991. After almost claiming the British Formula Ford Championship in 1991, and making a promising debut in the GM-Lotus formula, Ingall moved to Germany to drive for Team Schübel in the German Formula Three Championship. Ingall also had the opportunity to compete in Peter Wearing Smith's team at the Macau Grand Prix, where he started 23rd and overtook David Coulthard to finish in fifth position.

Over the northern winter, Ingall competed in the New Zealand Formula Ford series, winning easily with ten victories from 12 races.

Ingall made history in 1993 returning to the United Kingdom to drive for the factory Van Diemen team to win 13 out of the 16 races in the British Formula Ford Championship and in the process recording the highest number of wins in a single season in the history of Formula Ford.

The season was finished off by winning one of the most prestigious single-seater events – the Formula Ford Festival and World Cup at Brands Hatch in England.

Ingall was never able to live up to his full potential in Europe due to a lack of funding and later returned to Australia. This was common for Australian race drivers in Europe.

== V8 Supercar ==
=== Part-time drives ===
After spending the first half of 1994 in the Japanese Formula 3 Championship Ingall made his return to Touring Cars, having previously driven for the Bob Forbes Racing team in 1990, driving for Wayne Gardner Racing at the Sandown 500 and Bathurst 1000. Ingall and Win Percy led at Bathurst for some time before finishing fifth.

=== Perkins Engineering ===
Ingall went on to win the 1995 British Formula Renault Championship before joining Perkins Engineering for its campaign for the endurance races back in Australia. Ingall figured prominently in the team's epic last to first victory at Bathurst. He would then become a permanent face of the V8 Supercar Championship throughout 1996 season.

During his first year, Ingall claimed his maiden victory at Calder Park and then went on to win the Bathurst 1000 for the second time in 1997. He also finished second in 1998 and 2002.

In his seven years with Perkins Engineering, Ingall finish runner-up in the championship three times (1998, 1999 and 2001) and was third in 1997.

=== Stone Brothers Racing ===
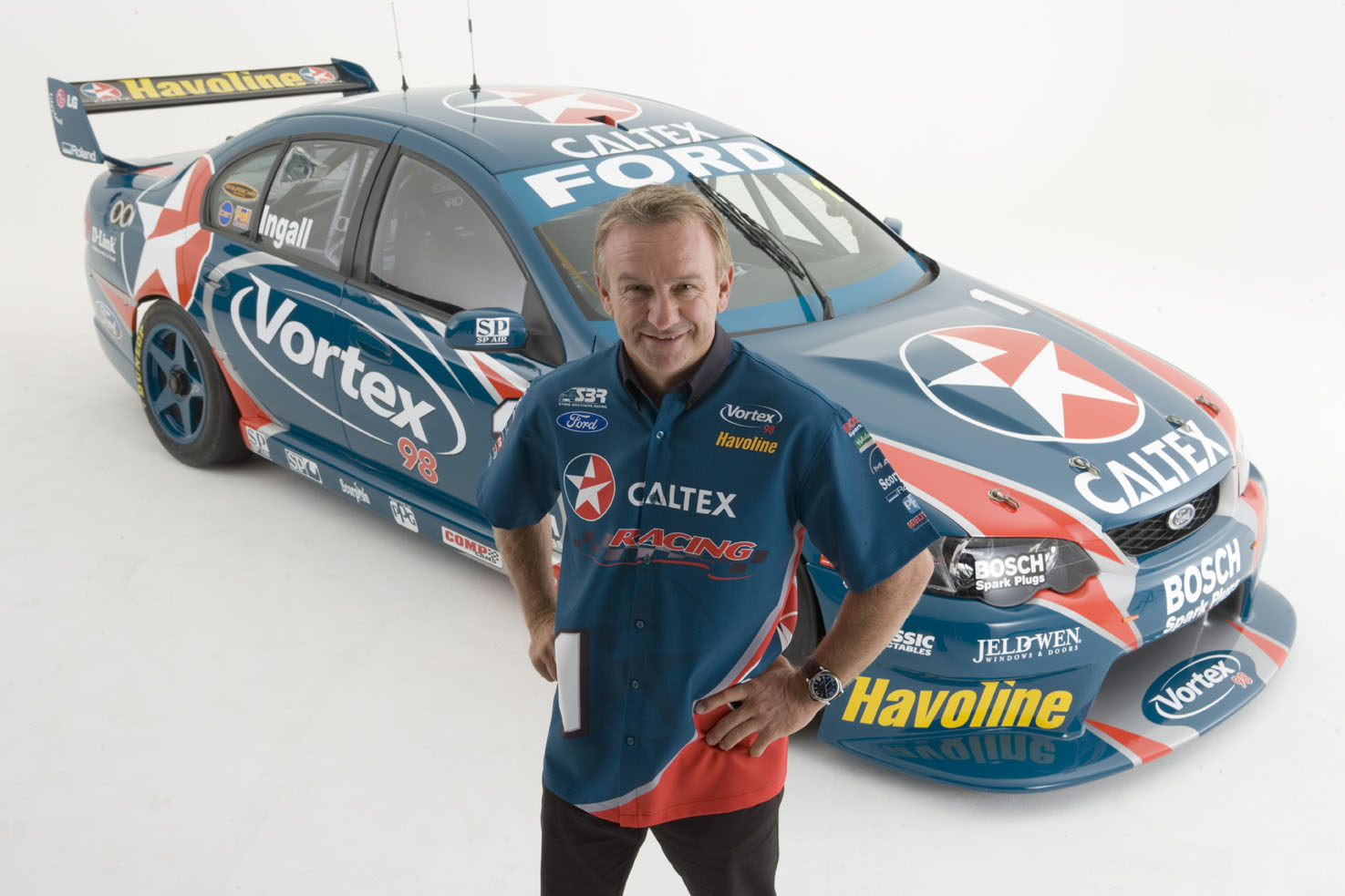
Russell Ingall with his Caltex Falcon

Following seven years with the Perkins team, Ingall moved to Stone Brothers Racing at the start of 2003 in winning style taking out the support races at the Australian Grand Prix.

Ingall also went on to win rounds at the Queensland 300 and the Gillette V8 Supercar Challenge at the Lexmark Indy 300 on the Gold Coast, Queensland before eventually finishing seventh outright in the championship.

In 2004, Ingall was again consistent with the highlight of the season coming with a round win at Symmons Plains in round 12. In the final round at Eastern Creek Raceway, he finished third overall to jump from fourth to second in the championship in his Caltex Ford Falcon BA and give Stone Brothers Racing an historic 1–2 finish as his teammate Marcos Ambrose won the championship.

In 2005, Ingall went one better, collecting his first V8 Supercar championship after having been runner-up four times. Ingall went into the season with a plan and he followed it to the final race of the season, which was held at the Phillip Island circuit. He raced "smarter" than he ever had before and worked out his strategy around the V8 Supercars points system to collect the title ahead of Craig Lowndes and Marcos Ambrose.

In 2006, Ingall saw the championship slip from his grasp due to poor performance from his car which saw him finish the championship in eighth place.

In the lead-up to the 2007 season finale, Ingall announced he was Holden bound, thus leaving Stone Brothers Racing and Ford after five years. He finished the championship for the first time outside the top-ten, placing a disappointing eleventh. For 2008, Ingall moved to Paul Morris Motorsport.

=== Supercheap Auto Racing ===
Ingall returned to the Holden fray in 2008 with Paul Morris Motorsport, now sponsored by automotive parts retailer Supercheap Auto. Ingall's debut race meeting for his new team proved less than ideal. Finishing in 14th place in the first leg of the Clipsal 500, contact with the wall at Turn 8 during the morning warmup saw steering and suspension damage to the No. 39 car. Repairs were made in time for the start of Race 2, but the car was not the same, and he retired after just two laps, with failure in the ignition system.

“If I didn't stick it in (during) the warm up, the distributor drive would have probably gone in the warm-up so we would have found the problem before the race, so one thing led to another," said Ingall. "At the end of the day it was all related to the shunt.”

In 2010, Ingall was joined by New Zealander Greg Murphy. Ingall remained with Paul Morris Motorsport until the end of 2011.

In 2012, Ingall moved to Walkinshaw Racing, with the Supercheap Auto sponsorship.

In 2013, Ingall continued the use of the No. 66 car, however, 2013 saw the change to the new Holden VF Commodore. Ingall's form for the year thus far has been inconsistent. At Townsville, Ingall celebrated his 226th race start (a new record beating John Bowe's 225) by using No. 226 on his car. In the Endurance events, Ingall teamed up with IndyCar racer Ryan Briscoe.

=== Lucas Dumbrell Motorsport ===
After toying with the idea of retiring from full-time motorsports in 2014, Ingall announced returned to V8 Supercars in the 2014 season with Lucas Dumbrell Motorsport.

At the end of 2014, Ingall retired from full-time driving. He will still compete as a co-driver in the three endurance races.

=== Return to V8 Supercars ===
In 2015, Ingall signed with the Holden Racing Team to race in the endurance series after James Courtney was injured in a freak accident. Ingall competed in the Sandown 500 and the Bathurst 1000 with HRT.

With Courtney returning to race in the Gold Coast 600, Prodrive Racing Australia signed Ingall as a replacement for Chaz Mostert, who was unable to drive due to injuries from his Bathurst crash.

=== Nissan Motorsport ===
Ingall signed with Nissan Motorsport to race in the Pirtek Enduro Cup in 2016 and joined Rick Kelly in the No. 15 Nissan Altima.

=== Triple Eight Race Engineering ===
Ingall made a return to the championship in a Triple Eight Race Engineering wildcard in the 2021 Bathurst 1000 alongside Broc Feeney in a Supercheap Auto backed #39 Holden Commodore ZB.

== Other racing ==
In October 2018, Ingall made his Stadium Super Trucks debut at Sydney Motorsport Park. He finished seventh and fifth in the weekend's two races. The following year, he returned to the series for the Gold Coast 600 round. In April 2021, Ingall took over for the injured Nash Morris for the series' final two races at Symmons Plains.

== Media career ==
In 2015, Ingall was appointed a co-host on Fox Sports coverage of V8 Supercars with five-time champion and former rival Mark Skaife.

Ingall hosted an online video series titled Enforcer and The Dude alongside Paul Morris.

== Career results ==
=== Karting career summary ===
| Season | Series | Position |
|---|---|---|
| 1984 | Australian National Sprint Kart Championships - Class Australia | **1st** |
| 1985 | Australian National Sprint Kart Championships - International Light | **1st** |
| 1986 | Australian National Sprint Kart Championships - Reed Class | **1st** |
| 1988 | Australian National Sprint Kart Championships - International Light | **1st** |

=== Circuit racing career ===
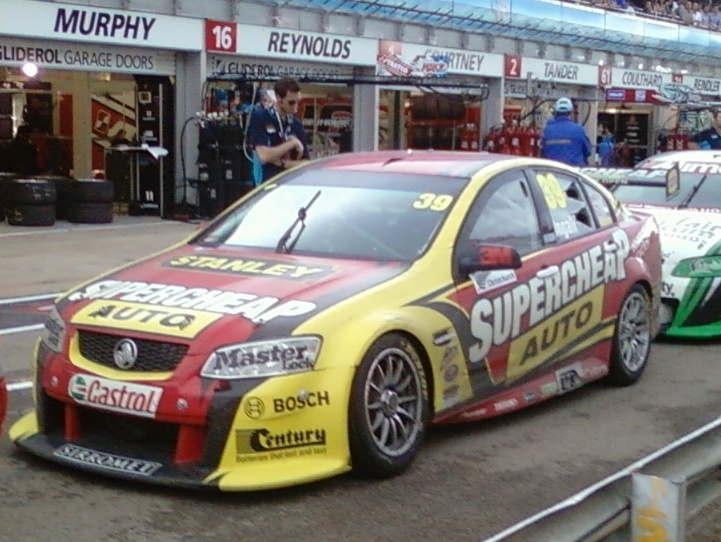
The Paul Morris Motorsport Holden VE Commodore of Russell Ingall at the 2011 Clipsal 500 Adelaide

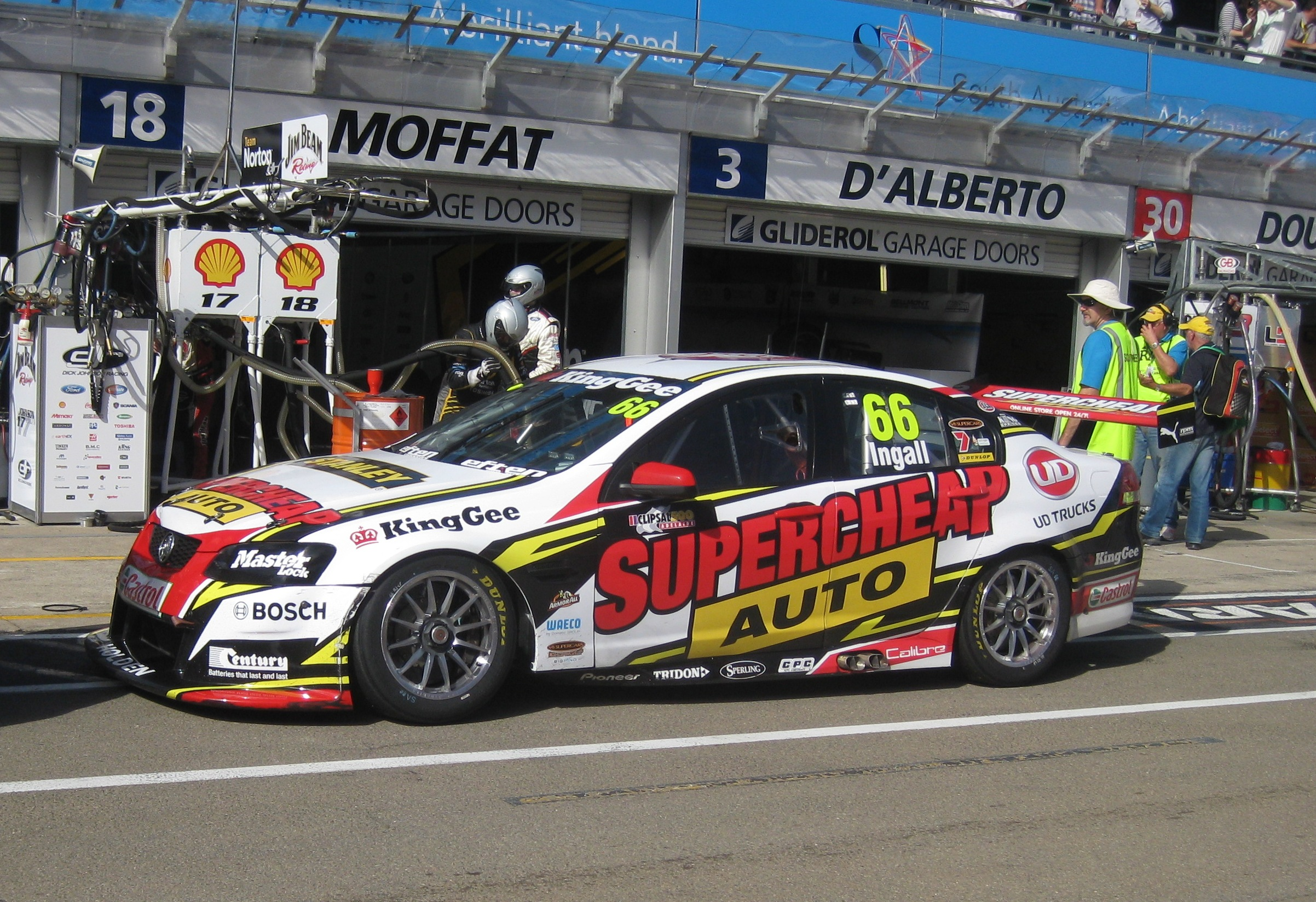
The Holden VE Commodore of Russell Ingall at the 2012 Clipsal 500 Adelaide

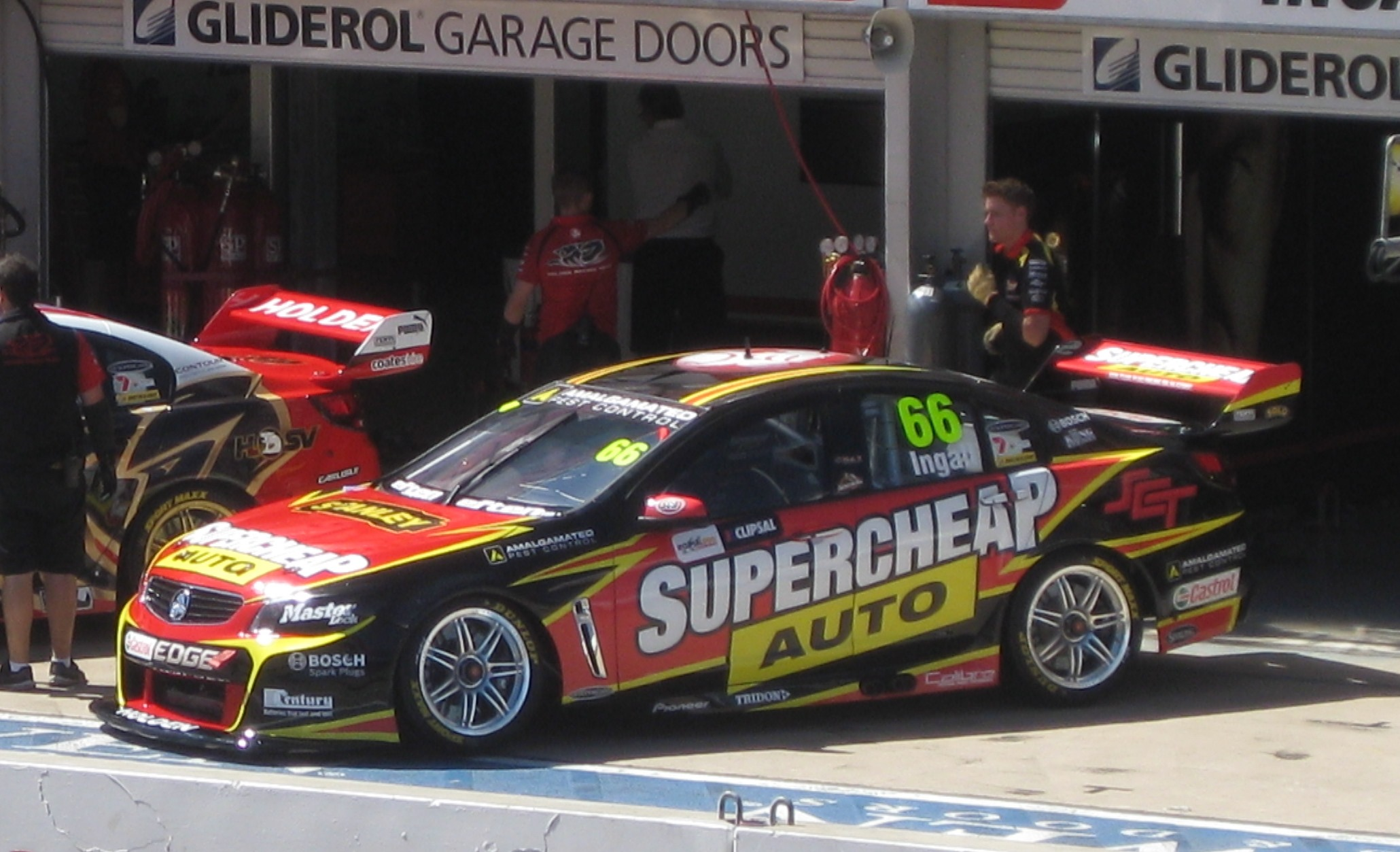
The Holden VF Commodore of Russell Ingall at the 2013 Clipsal 500 Adelaide

| Season | Series | Position | Car | Team |
|---|---|---|---|---|
| 1987 | Motorcraft Formula Ford Driver to Europe Series | 25th | Elfin Ford | David Craig |
| 1988 | Motorcraft Formula Ford Driver to Europe Series | 8th | Van Diemen RF86 Ford | |
| 1989 | Motorcraft Formula Ford Driver to Europe Series | **2nd** | Van Diemen RF89 Ford | Russell Ingall |
| 1990 | Motorcraft Formula Ford Driver to Europe Series | **1st** | Van Diemen RF90 Ford | Coffey Ford |
| 1991 | British Formula Ford Championship | **2nd** | Van Diemen RF91 Ford | |
| 1992 | German Formula 3 Championship | 9th | Dallara F392 Opel | Opel Team Schübel |
| 1993 | British Formula Ford Championship | **1st** | Van Diemen RF93 Ford | Van Diemen |
| 1994 | All-Japan Formula 3 Championship | 11th | Dallara 394 Toyota TOM's | Navi Connection Racing |
| 1995 | British Formula Renault Championship | **3rd** | Van Diemen RF95 - Renault | |
| 1996 | Australian Touring Car Championship | 6th | Holden VR Commodore | Perkins Engineering |
| 1996 | Australian Super Touring Championship | 12th | Vauxhall Cavalier | Phoenix Motorsport |
| 1997 | Australian Touring Car Championship | **3rd** | Holden VS Commodore | Perkins Engineering |
| 1998 | Australian Touring Car Championship | **2nd** | Holden VS Commodore | Perkins Engineering |
| 1999 | Shell Championship Series | **2nd** | Holden VT Commodore | Castrol Perkins Racing |
| 2000 | Shell Championship Series | 8th | Holden VT Commodore | Castrol Perkins Racing |
| 2001 | Shell Championship Series | **2nd** | Holden VX Commodore | Castrol Perkins Racing |
| 2002 | V8 Supercar Championship Series | 9th | Holden VX Commodore | Castrol Perkins Racing |
| 2003 | V8 Supercar Championship Series | 7th | Ford BA Falcon | Stone Brothers Racing |
| 2004 | V8 Supercar Championship Series | **2nd** | Ford BA Falcon | Stone Brothers Racing |
| 2005 | V8 Supercar Championship Series | **1st** | Ford BA Falcon | Stone Brothers Racing |
| 2006 | V8 Supercar Championship Series | 8th | Ford BA Falcon | Stone Brothers Racing |
| 2007 | V8 Supercar Championship Series | 11th | Ford BF Falcon | Stone Brothers Racing |
| 2008 | V8 Supercar Championship Series | 9th | Holden VE Commodore | Paul Morris Motorsport |
| 2009 | V8 Supercar Championship Series | 9th | Holden VE Commodore | Paul Morris Motorsport |
| 2010 | V8 Supercar Championship Series | 12th | Holden VE Commodore | Paul Morris Motorsport |
| 2011 | International V8 Supercars Championship | 20th | Holden VE Commodore | Paul Morris Motorsport |
| 2012 | International V8 Supercars Championship | 13th | Holden VE Commodore | Walkinshaw Racing |
| 2013 | International V8 Supercars Championship | 15th | Holden VF Commodore | Walkinshaw Racing |
| 2014 | International V8 Supercars Championship | 18th | Holden VF Commodore | Lucas Dumbrell Motorsport |
| 2015 | International V8 Supercars Championship | 40th | Holden VF Commodore; Ford FG X Falcon | Holden Racing Team; Prodrive Racing Australia |
| 2016 | International V8 Supercars Championship | 48th | Nissan Altima | Nissan Motorsport |
| 2018 | Stadium Super Trucks | 21st | Stadium Super Truck | Boost Mobile |
| 2019 | Stadium Super Trucks | 17th | Stadium Super Truck | The Boat Works |
| 2019 | TCR Australia Touring Car Series | 9th | Audi RS3 LMS | Melbourne Performance Centre |
| 2021 | Boost Mobile Super Trucks | 11th | Stadium Super Truck | Boost Mobile |

=== Complete German Formula Three results ===
(key) (Races in bold indicate pole position) (Races in italics indicate fastest lap)

| Year | Entrant | Engine | Class | 1 | 2 | 3 | 4 | 5 | 6 | 7 | 8 | 9 | 10 | 11 | 12 | 13 | 14 | 15 | 16 | 17 | 18 | 19 | 20 | 21 | 22 | 23 | 24 | 25 | 26 | DC | Pts |
|---|---|---|---|---|---|---|---|---|---|---|---|---|---|---|---|---|---|---|---|---|---|---|---|---|---|---|---|---|---|---|---|
| 1992 | Opel Team Schübel | Opel | A | ZOL; 1; 16 | ZOL; 2; 8 | NÜR; 1 Ret | NÜR; 2; 9 | WUN; 1 DNS | WUN; 2; 9 | AVU; 1; 4 | AVU; 2; 4 | NÜR; 1; 8 | NÜR; 2; 5 | HOC; 1 Ret | HOC; 2 Ret | NOR; 1; 16 | |NOR; 2; 8 | BRN; 1; 4 | BRN; 2; 5 | DIE; 1 Ret | DIE; 2 DNS | NÜR; 1; 3 | NÜR; 2 Ret | SIN; 1 Ret | SIN; 2; 8 | |NÜR; 1 Ret | NÜR; 2; 6 | HOC; 1; 2 | HOC; 2 Ret | 9th | 95 |

=== Complete Macau Grand Prix results ===
| Year | Team | Car | Qualifying | Quali race | Main race |
|---|---|---|---|---|---|
| 1992 | (United Kingdom) Madgwick Motorsport | Van Diemen RF92 | 23rd | ? | 5th |

=== Complete Australian Touring Car Championship / Supercars Championship results ===
(key) (Races in bold indicate pole position) (Races in italics indicate fastest lap)

| Year | Team | No. | Car | 1 | 2 | 3 | 4 | 5 | 6 | 7 | 8 | 9 | 10 | 11 | 12 | 13 | 14 | 15 | 16 | 17 | 18 | 19 | 20 | 21 | 22 | 23 | 24 | 25 | 26 | 27 | 28 | 29 | 30 | 31 | 32 | 33 | 34 | 35 | 36 | 37 | 38 | 39 | DC | Points |
|---|---|---|---|---|---|---|---|---|---|---|---|---|---|---|---|---|---|---|---|---|---|---|---|---|---|---|---|---|---|---|---|---|---|---|---|---|---|---|---|---|---|---|---|---|
| 1996 | Perkins Engineering | 8 | Holden VR Commodore | EAS; R1; 9 | EAS; R2; 3 | EAS; R3; 8 | SAN; R4; 7 | SAN; R5; 6 | SAN; R6; 4 | BAT; R7; Ret | BAT; R8; 9 | BAT; R9; 7 | SYM; R10; 6 | SYM; R11; Ret | SYM; R12; Ret | PHI; R13; 5 | PHI; R14; Ret | PHI; R15; 4 | CAL; R16; 2 | CAL; R17; 1 | **CAL**; **R18**; **2** | LAK; R19; 11 | LAK; R20; 8 | LAK; R21; 5 | BAR; R22; 15 | BAR; R23; Ret | BAR; R24; 6 | MAL; R25; 5 | MAL; R26; 15 | MAL; R27; 6 | ORA; R28; 9 | ORA; R29; 8 | ORA; R30; 10 | | | | | | | | | | 6th | 183 |
| 1997 | Perkins Engineering | 8 | Holden VS Commodore | CAL; R1; 8 | CAL; R2; 3 | CAL; R3; 3 | PHI; R4; 2 | PHI; R5; 1 | **PHI**; **R6**; **2** | SAN; R7; 6 | SAN; R8; 3 | SAN; R9; 5 | SYM; R10; 8 | SYM; R11; 6 | SYM; R12; 6 | WIN; R13; 2 | WIN; R14; 1 | **WIN**; **R15**; **1** | EAS; R16; 4 | EAS; R17; 5 | EAS; R18; 4 | LAK; R19; 7 | LAK; R20; 4 | LAK; R21; 1 | BAR; R22; 10 | BAR; R23; 5 | BAR; R24; 6 | MAL; R25; 5 | MAL; R26; 5 | MAL; R27; 10 | ORA; R28; Ret | ORA; R29; Ret | ORA; R30; DNS | | | | | | | | | | 3rd | 572 |
| 1998 | Perkins Engineering | 8 | Holden VS Commodore | SAN; R1; 14 | SAN; R2; 4 | SAN; R3; 2 | SYM; R4; 4 | SYM; R5; 3 | SYM; R6; 7 | LAK; R7; 3 | LAK; R8; 1 | LAK; R9; 1 | PHI; R10; 3 | PHI; R11; 3 | PHI; R12; 1 | WIN; R13; 1 | WIN; R14; 2 | WIN; R15; 3 | MAL; R16; 2 | MAL; R17; 1 | MAL; R18; 2 | BAR; R19; 3 | BAR; R20; 3 | BAR; R21; 2 | CAL; R22; 11 | CAL; R23; 4 | CAL; R24; C | HDV; R25; 12 | HDV; R26; 1 | HDV; R27; 1 | ORA; R28; 6 | ORA; R29; 9 | ORA; R30; 7 | | | | | | | | | | 2nd | 942 |
| 1999 | Perkins Engineering | 8 | Holden VT Commodore | EAS; R1; 8 | EAS; R2; 9 | EAS; R3; 5 | ADE; R4; 4 | BAR; R5; Ret | BAR; R6; 10 | BAR; R7; 4 | PHI; R8; 3 | PHI; R9; 5 | PHI; R10; 6 | HDV; R11; 1 | HDV; R12; 1 | HDV; R13; 14 | SAN; R14; 18 | SAN; R15; 11 | SAN; R16; 6 | QLD; R17; 1 | QLD; R18; 2 | QLD; R19; Ret | CAL; R20; 4 | CAL; R21; 2 | CAL; R22; Ret | SYM; R23; 7 | SYM; R24; 5 | SYM; R25; 2 | WIN; R26; 4 | WIN; R27; 3 | WIN; R28; 2 | ORA; R29; 6 | ORA; R30; 11 | ORA; R31; 8 | QLD; R32; 1 | BAT; R33; 7 | | | | | | | 2nd | 1804 |
| 2000 | Perkins Engineering | 8 | Holden VT Commodore | PHI; R1; 21 | PHI; R2; 28 | BAR; R3; 4 | BAR; R4; 3 | BAR; R5; 4 | ADE; R6; Ret | ADE; R7; 6 | EAS; R8; 5 | EAS; R9; 4 | EAS; R10; 1 | HDV; R11; 6 | HDV; R12; Ret | HDV; R13; 10 | CAN; R14; 4 | CAN; R15; Ret | CAN; R16; 19 | QLD; R17; 4 | QLD; R18; 3 | QLD; R19; 3 | WIN; R20; 8 | WIN; R21; Ret | WIN; R22; 7 | ORA; R23; 6 | **ORA**; **R24**; **1** | ORA; R25; Ret | CAL; R26; Ret | CAL; R27; 13 | CAL; R28; 8 | QLD; R29; 4 | SAN; R30; Ret | SAN; R31; 13 | SAN; R32; 8 | BAT; R33; 11 | | | | | | | 8th | 953 |
| 2001 | Perkins Engineering | 8 | Holden VX Commodore | PHI; R1; 9 | PHI; R2; 8 | ADE; R3; 3 | ADE; R4; 2 | EAS; R5; 23 | EAS; R6; 12 | HDV; R7; 1 | **HDV**; **R8**; **22** | HDV; R9; 9 | CAN; R10; 8 | CAN; R11; 11 | CAN; R12; 9 | BAR; R13; 3 | BAR; R14; 3 | BAR; R15; 17 | CAL; R16; 4 | CAL; R17; 3 | CAL; R18; 2 | ORA; R19; 8 | ORA; R20; 5 | QLD; R21; 2 | **WIN**; **R22**; **2** | WIN; R23; 1 | BAT; R24; 8 | PUK; R25; 5 | PUK; R26; 27 | PUK; R27; 11 | SAN; R28; 4 | SAN; R29; 23 | SAN; R30; 6 | | | | | | | | | | 2nd | 2875 |
| 2002 | Perkins Engineering | 8 | Holden VX Commodore | ADE; R1; 21 | ADE; R2; 7 | PHI; R3; 17 | PHI; R4; 15 | EAS; R5; 5 | EAS; R6; 29 | EAS; R7; 27 | HDV; R8; Ret | HDV; R9; DNS | HDV; R10; 9 | CAN; R11; 28 | CAN; R12; 1 | CAN; R13; 9 | BAR; R14; 16 | BAR; R15; 27 | BAR; R16; 14 | ORA; R17; 5 | ORA; R18; 5 | WIN; R19; 9 | WIN; R20; 6 | QLD; R21; 2 | BAT; R22; 2 | SUR; R23; Ret | SUR; R24; DNS | PUK; R25; 10 | PUK; R26; 11 | PUK; R27; 11 | SAN; R28; 25 | SAN; R29; 19 | | | | | | | | | | | 9th | 973 |
| 2003 | Stone Brothers Racing | 9 | Ford BA Falcon | ADE; R1; 7 | ADE; R1; 12 | PHI; R3; 10 | EAS; R4; 3 | WIN; R5; 4 | BAR; R6; 5 | BAR; R7; 27 | BAR; R8; 14 | HDV; R9; Ret | HDV; R10; 17 | HDV; R11; 8 | QLD; R12; 1 | ORA; R13; 8 | SAN; R14; 5 | BAT; R15; 6 | SUR; R16; 1 | **SUR**; **R17**; **1** | PUK; R18; 19 | PUK; R19; 26 | PUK; R20; 10 | EAS; R21; DSQ | EAS; R22; DSQ | | | | | | | | | | | | | | | | | | 7th | 1701 |
| 2004 | Stone Brothers Racing | 9 | Ford BA Falcon | ADE; R1; 3 | ADE; R2; Ret | EAS; R3; 14 | PUK; R4; 12 | PUK; R5; 7 | PUK; R6; 7 | HDV; R7; 1 | **HDV**; **R8**; **11** | HDV; R9; 5 | BAR; R10; 9 | BAR; R11; 17 | BAR; R12; 13 | QLD; R13; 4 | WIN; R14; 4 | ORA; R15; 3 | ORA; R16; 4 | SAN; R17; 2 | BAT; R18; 6 | SUR; R19; 25 | SUR; R20; 10 | SYM; R21; 7 | SYM; R22; 5 | SYM; R23; 5 | EAS; R24; 7 | EAS; R25; 9 | EAS; R26; 3 | | | | | | | | | | | | | | 2nd | 1936 |
| 2005 | Stone Brothers Racing | 9 | Ford BA Falcon | ADE; R1; 2 | ADE; R2; 18 | PUK; R3; 2 | PUK; R4; 2 | PUK; R5; 2 | BAR; R6; 4 | BAR; R7; 2 | BAR; R8; 1 | EAS; R9; 5 | EAS; R10; 6 | SHA; R11; 13 | SHA; R12; 6 | SHA; R13; 26 | HDV; R14; 14 | HDV; R15; 4 | HDV; R16; Ret | QLD; R17; 4 | ORA; R18; 2 | ORA; R19; 1 | SAN; R20; 7 | BAT; R21; 5 | SUR; R22; 4 | SUR; R23; 10 | SUR; R24; 24 | SYM; R25; 8 | SYM; R26; 9 | SYM; R27; 10 | PHI; R28; 5 | PHI; R29; 5 | PHI; R30; 5 | | | | | | | | | | 1st | 1922 |
| 2006 | Stone Brothers Racing | 1 | Ford BA Falcon | ADE; R1; 9 | ADE; R2; 7 | PUK; R3; 2 | PUK; R4; 6 | PUK; R5; 5 | BAR; R6; 10 | BAR; R7; 8 | BAR; R8; 6 | WIN; R9; 12 | WIN; R10; 5 | WIN; R11; 25 | HDV; R12; 10 | HDV; R13; 7 | HDV; R14; 9 | QLD; R15; 5 | QLD; R16; 9 | QLD; R17; 5 | ORA; R18; 12 | ORA; R19; 5 | ORA; R20; 21 | SAN; R21; 27 | BAT; R22; 4 | SUR; R23; 8 | SUR; R24; 8 | SUR; R25; 5 | SYM; R26; 14 | SYM; R27; 10 | SYM; R28; 10 | BHR; R29; 13 | BHR; R30; 21 | BHR; R31; 10 | PHI; R32; 14 | PHI; R33; 26 | PHI; R34; 30 | | | | | | 8th | 2708 |
| 2007 | Stone Brothers Racing | 9 | Ford BF Falcon | ADE; R1; 8 | ADE; R2; 4 | BAR; R3; 24 | BAR; R4; 14 | BAR; R5; 10 | PUK; R6; 8 | PUK; R7; 9 | PUK; R8; 10 | WIN; R9; Ret | WIN; R10; 8 | WIN; R11; 6 | EAS; R12; 7 | EAS; R13; 11 | EAS; R14; 12 | HDV; R15; Ret | HDV; R16; Ret | HDV; R17; 11 | QLD; R18; 9 | QLD; R19; 6 | QLD; R20; 9 | ORA; R21; Ret | ORA; R22; 9 | ORA; R23; 3 | SAN; R24; 7 | BAT; R25; Ret | SUR; R26; 4 | SUR; R27; 3 | SUR; R28; 3 | BHR; R29; 5 | BHR; R30; 8 | BHR; R31; 7 | SYM; R32; 16 | SYM; R33; 30 | SYM; R34; 13 | PHI; R35; 8 | PHI; R36; 19 | PHI; R37; 26 | | | 11th | 311 |
| 2008 | Paul Morris Motorsport | 39 | Holden VE Commodore | ADE; R1; 14 | ADE; R2; Ret | EAS; R3; 11 | EAS; R4; 4 | EAS; R5; 7 | HAM; R6; Ret | HAM; R7; Ret | HAM; R8; 11 | BAR; R9; 11 | BAR; R10; 24 | BAR; R11; Ret | SAN; R12; 4 | SAN; R13; 7 | SAN; R14; 6 | HDV; R15; 7 | HDV; R16; 6 | HDV; R17; 4 | QLD; R18; 3 | QLD; R19; 2 | QLD; R20; 3 | WIN; R21; 7 | WIN; R22; Ret | WIN; R23; 7 | PHI; R24; 9 | BAT; R25; 18 | SUR; R26; 5 | SUR; R27; 8 | SUR; R28; 7 | BHR; R29; 4 | BHR; R30; 2 | BHR; R31; 5 | SYM; R32; 13 | SYM; R33; 25 | SYM; R34; 16 | ORA; R35; 3 | ORA; R36; 2 | ORA; R37; 11 | | | 9th | 2236 |
| 2009 | Paul Morris Motorsport | 39 | Holden VE Commodore | ADE; R1; 8 | ADE; R2; 15 | HAM; R3; 23 | HAM; R4; Ret | WIN; R5; 9 | WIN; R6; 11 | SYM; R7; 2 | SYM; R8; 6 | HDV; R9; 13 | HDV; R10; 8 | TOW; R11; 6 | TOW; R12; Ret | SAN; R13; 7 | SAN; R14; 14 | QLD; R15; 12 | QLD; R16; 3 | PHI; Q 5 | PHI; R17; 7 | BAT; R18; 15 | SUR; R19; 9 | SUR; R20; Ret | SUR; R21; 4 | SUR; R22; Ret | PHI; R23; 13 | PHI; R24; 27 | BAR; R25; 9 | BAR; R26; 5 | SYD; R27; 16 | SYD; R28; 4 | | | | | | | | | | | 9th | 2048 |
| 2010 | Paul Morris Motorsport | 39 | Holden VE Commodore | YMC; R1; 27 | YMC; R2; 9 | BHR; R3; 7 | BHR; R4; 13 | ADE; R5; 10 | ADE; R6; 19 | HAM; R7; Ret | HAM; R8; 12 | QLD; R9; 14 | QLD; R10; 4 | WIN; R11; 11 | WIN; R12; 16 | HDV; R13; 11 | HDV; R14; 25 | TOW; R15; 6 | TOW; R16; Ret | PHI; R17; 8 | BAT; R18; 8 | SUR; R19; 12 | SUR; R20; 8 | SYM; R21; 7 | SYM; R22; 4 | SAN; R23; 5 | SAN; R24; 13 | SYD; R25; 12 | SYD; R26; 20 | | | | | | | | | | | | | | 12th | 1967 |
| 2011 | Paul Morris Motorsport | 39 | Holden VE Commodore | YMC; R1; 24 | YMC; R2; Ret | ADE; R3; Ret | ADE; R4; 16 | HAM; R5; 14 | HAM; R6; 8 | BAR; R7; 14 | BAR; R8; 12 | BAR; R9; 19 | WIN; R10; 17 | WIN; R11; Ret | HID; R12; 23 | HID; R13; 5 | TOW; R14; 10 | TOW; R15; 9 | QLD; R16; 16 | QLD; R17; 12 | QLD; R18; 11 | PHI; R19; 20 | BAT; R20; 8 | SUR; R21; 22 | SUR; R22; 8 | SYM; R23; Ret | SYM; R24; 17 | SAN; R25; 14 | SAN; R26; 23 | SYD; R27; 17 | SYD; R28; 5 | | | | | | | | | | | | 20th | 1514 |
| 2012 | Walkinshaw Racing | 66 | Holden VE Commodore | ADE; R1; 13 | ADE; R2; 13 | SYM; R3; 24 | SYM; R4; 25 | HAM; R5; 10 | HAM; R6; 14 | BAR; R7; 11 | BAR; R8; 17 | BAR; R9; 13 | PHI; R10; 11 | PHI; R11; 15 | HID; R12; 23 | HID; R13; Ret | TOW; R14; 11 | TOW; R15; Ret | QLD; R16; 5 | QLD; R17; 6 | SMP; R18; 5 | SMP; R19; 4 | SAN; QR; 15 | SAN; R20; 11 | BAT; R21; 9 | SUR; R22; 9 | SUR; R23; 7 | YMC; R24; 18 | YMC; R25; 16 | YMC; R26; 16 | WIN; R27; 12 | WIN; R28; 9 | SYD; R29; 12 | SYD; R30; Ret | | | | | | | | | 13th | 1935 |
| 2013 | Walkinshaw Racing | 66 | Holden VF Commodore | ADE; R1; 10 | ADE; R2; 4 | SYM; R3; 15 | SYM; R4; 18 | SYM; R5; 26 | PUK; R6; 14 | PUK; R7; 14 | PUK; R8; 11 | PUK; R9; 13 | BAR; R10; 23 | BAR; R11; 21 | BAR; R12; Ret | COA; R13; 24 | COA; R14; 18 | COA; R15; 22 | COA; R16; 22 | HID; R17; 23 | HID; R18; 26 | HID; R19; 16 | TOW; R20; Ret | TOW; R21; 5 | QLD; R22; 14 | QLD; R23; 20 | QLD; R24; Ret | WIN; R25; 9 | WIN; R26; Ret | WIN; R27; DNS | SAN; R28; 9 | BAT; R29; 17 | SUR; R30; 5 | SUR; R31; 3 | PHI; R32; 13 | PHI; R33; 15 | PHI; R34; Ret | SYD; R35; 22 | SYD; R36; 10 | | | | 15th | 1556 |
| 2014 | Lucas Dumbrell Motorsport | 23 | Holden VF Commodore | ADE; R1; 12 | ADE; R2; 13 | ADE; R3; 17 | SYM; R4; 4 | SYM; R5; 21 | SYM; R6; 11 | WIN; R7; 10 | WIN; R8; 22 | WIN; R9; 20 | PUK; R10; 15 | PUK; R11; 19 | PUK; R12; 14 | PUK; R13; 19 | BAR; R14; 11 | BAR; R15; 10 | BAR; R16; 13 | HID; R17; 19 | HID; R18; 21 | HID; R19; 10 | TOW; R20; 21 | TOW; R21; 20 | TOW; R22; 21 | QLD; R23; 20 | QLD; R24; 21 | QLD; R25; 13 | SMP; R26; 14 | SMP; R27; 10 | SMP; R28; 17 | SAN; QR; 24 | SAN; R29; 14 | BAT; R30; Ret | SUR; R31; 8 | SUR; R32; 8 | PHI; R33; 20 | PHI; R34; 18 | PHI; R35; 23 | SYD; R36; 19 | SYD; R37; 25 | SYD; R38; 20 | 18th | 1510 |
| 2015 | Holden Racing Team | 22 | Holden VF Commodore | ADE; R1 | ADE; R2 | ADE; R3 | SYM; R4 | SYM; R5 | SYM; R6 | BAR; R7 | BAR; R8 | BAR; R9 | WIN; R10 | WIN; R11 | WIN; R12 | HID; R13 | HID; R14 | HID; R15 | TOW; R16 | TOW; R17 | QLD; R18 | QLD; R19 | QLD; R20 | SMP; R21 | SMP; R22 | SMP; R23 | SAN; QR; 6 | SAN; R24; 9 | BAT; R25; 11 | | | | | | | | | | | | | | 40th | 414 |
| 2015 | Prodrive Racing Australia | 6 | Ford FG X Falcon | | | | | | | | | | | | | | | | | | | | | | | | | | | SUR; R26; 17 | SUR; R27; 19 | PUK; R28 | PUK; R29 | PUK; R30 | PHI; R31 | PHI; R32 | PHI; R33 | SYD; R34 | SYD; R35 | SYD; R36 | | | 40th | 414 |
| 2016 | Nissan Motorsport | 15 | Nissan Altima L33 | ADE; R1 | ADE; R2 | ADE; R3 | SYM; R4 | SYM; R5 | PHI; R6 | PHI; R7 | BAR; R8 | BAR; R9 | WIN; R10; PO | WIN; R11; PO | HID; R12 | HID; R13 | TOW; R14 | TOW; R15 | QLD; R16; PO | QLD; R17; PO | SMP; R18 | SMP; R19 | SAN; QR; 18 | SAN; R20; 10 | BAT; R21; Ret | SUR; R22; 21 | SUR; R23; 17 | PUK; R24 | PUK; R25 | PUK; R26 | PUK; R27 | SYD; R28 | SYD; R29 | | | | | | | | | | 48th | 252 |
| 2021 | Triple Eight Race Engineering | 39 | Holden Commodore ZB | BAT1; R1 | BAT1; R2 | SAN; R3 | SAN; R4 | SAN; R5 | SYM; R6 | SYM; R7 | SYM; R8 | BEN; R9 | BEN; R10 | BEN; R11 | HID; R12 | HID; R13 | HID; R14 | TOW1; R15 | TOW1; R16 | TOW2; R17 | TOW2; R18 | TOW2; R19 | SMP1; R20 | SMP1; R21 | SMP1; R22 | SMP2; R23 | SMP2; R24 | SMP2; R25 | SMP3; R26 | SMP3; R27 | SMP3; R28 | SMP4; R29 | SMP4; R30 | BAT2; R31; Ret | | | | | | | | | NC | 0 |

=== Complete Bathurst 1000 results ===
| Year | Car# | Team | Car | Co-driver | Position | Laps |
|---|---|---|---|---|---|---|
| 1990 | 13 | Bob Forbes Motorsport | Holden Commodore VL SS Group A SV | (Australia) Kevin Bartlett | 17th | 146 |
| 1994 | 7 | Wayne Gardner Racing | Holden Commodore VP | (United Kingdom) Win Percy | 5th | 161 |
| 1995 | 11 | Perkins Engineering | Holden Commodore VR | (Australia) Larry Perkins | **1st** | 161 |
| 1996 | 11 | Perkins Engineering | Holden Commodore VP | (Australia) Larry Perkins | 6th | 160 |
| 1997* | 11 | Perkins Engineering | Holden Commodore VS | (Australia) Larry Perkins | **1st** | 161 |
| 1998 | 80 | Triple Eight Racing | Holden Vectra | (New Zealand) Greg Murphy | DNF | 83 |
| 1998* | 11 | Perkins Engineering | Holden Commodore VT | (Australia) Larry Perkins | **2nd** | 161 |
| 1999 | 11 | Perkins Engineering | Holden Commodore VT | (Australia) Larry Perkins | 7th | 161 |
| 2000 | 11 | Perkins Engineering | Holden Commodore VT | (Australia) Larry Perkins | 11th | 159 |
| 2001 | 11 | Perkins Engineering | Holden Commodore VX | (Australia) Larry Perkins | 8th | 161 |
| 2002 | 16 | Perkins Engineering | Holden Commodore VX | (New Zealand) Steven Richards | **2nd** | 161 |
| 2003 | 4 | Stone Brothers Racing | Ford Falcon BA | (Australia) Marcos Ambrose | 6th | 161 |
| 2004 | 9 | Stone Brothers Racing | Ford Falcon BA | (Australia) Cameron McLean | 6th | 161 |
| 2005 | 9 | Stone Brothers Racing | Ford Falcon BA | (Australia) Luke Youlden | 5th | 161 |
| 2006 | 1 | Stone Brothers Racing | Ford Falcon BA | (Australia) Luke Youlden | 4th | 161 |
| 2007 | 9 | Stone Brothers Racing | Ford Falcon BF | (Australia) Luke Youlden | DNF | 149 |
| 2008 | 39 | Paul Morris Motorsport | Holden Commodore VE | (Australia) Paul Morris | 18th | 156 |
| 2009 | 39 | Paul Morris Motorsport | Holden Commodore VE | (Australia) Owen Kelly | 15th | 160 |
| 2010 | 39 | Paul Morris Motorsport | Holden Commodore VE | (Australia) Paul Morris | 8th | 161 |
| 2011 | 200 | Paul Morris Motorsport | Holden Commodore VE | (Australia) Jack Perkins | 8th | 161 |
| 2012 | 66 | Walkinshaw Racing | Holden Commodore VE | (Austria) Christian Klien | 9th | 161 |
| 2013 | 66 | Walkinshaw Racing | Holden Commodore VF | (Australia) Ryan Briscoe | 17th | 161 |
| 2014 | 23 | Lucas Dumbrell Motorsport | Holden Commodore VF | (Australia) Tim Blanchard | DNF | 137 |
| 2015 | 22 | Holden Racing Team | Holden Commodore VF | (Australia) Jack Perkins | 11th | 161 |
| 2016 | 15 | Nissan Motorsport | Nissan Altima L33 | (Australia) Rick Kelly | DNF | 156 |
| 2021 | 39 | Triple Eight Race Engineering | Holden Commodore ZB | (Australia) Broc Feeney | DNF | 142 |

* Australian 1000 race

=== Complete Bathurst 12 Hour results ===
| Year | Team | Co-drivers | Car | Class | Laps | Overall position | Class position |
|---|---|---|---|---|---|---|---|
| 2009 | (Australia) Holden Motorsport | (Australia) Nathan Pretty (Australia) Andrew Jones | HSV E Series Clubsport R8 Tourer | A | 223 | 15th | 6th |
| 2017 | (Australia) BMW Team SRM | (Germany) Timo Glock (Australia) Mark Skaife (Australia) Tony Longhurst | BMW M6 GT3 | AP | 134 | DNF | DNF |

=== Stadium Super Trucks ===
(key) (Bold – Pole position. Italics – Fastest qualifier. * – Most laps led.)

Stadium Super Trucks results
| Year | 1 | 2 | 3 | 4 | 5 | 6 | 7 | 8 | 9 | 10 | 11 | 12 | 13 | 14 | 15 | 16 | 17 | 18 | 19 | 20 | SSTC | Pts | Ref |
|---|---|---|---|---|---|---|---|---|---|---|---|---|---|---|---|---|---|---|---|---|---|---|---|
| 2018 | ELS | ADE | ADE | ADE | LBH | LBH | PER | PER | DET | DET | TEX | TEX | ROA | ROA | SMP; 7 | SMP; 5 | HLN | HLN | MXC | MXC | 21st | 30 | |
| 2019 | COA | COA | TEX | TEX | LBH | LBH | TOR | TOR | MOH | MOH | MOH | MOH | ROA | ROA | ROA | POR | POR | SRF; 5 | SRF; 6 | | 17th | 31 | |

==== Boost Mobile Super Trucks ====
(key) (Bold – Pole position. Italics – Fastest qualifier. * – Most laps led.)

Boost Mobile Super Trucks results
| Year | 1 | 2 | 3 | 4 | 5 | 6 | 7 | 8 | 9 | BMSTC | Pts | Ref |
|---|---|---|---|---|---|---|---|---|---|---|---|---|
| 2021 | SYM | SYM; 5^{†} | SYM; 6^{†} | HID; 10 | **HID**; 9 | HID; 5 | TOW | TOW | TOW | 11th | 15 | |
† – Replaced Nash Morris, points went to Morris

^{*} Season in progress.

=== TCR Australia results ===
TCR Australia results
| Year | Team | Car | 1 | 2 | 3 | 4 | 5 | 6 | 7 | 8 | 9 | 10 | 11 | 12 | 13 | 14 | 15 | 16 | 17 | 18 | 19 | 20 | 21 | Position | Points |
|---|---|---|---|---|---|---|---|---|---|---|---|---|---|---|---|---|---|---|---|---|---|---|---|---|---|
| 2019 | Melbourne Performance Centre | Audi RS 3 LMS TCR | SMP; R1 | SMP; R2 | SMP; R3 | PHI; R4 | PHI; R5 | PHI; R6 | BEN; R7; 9 | BEN; R8; 6 | BEN; R9; 6 | QLD; R10; 3 | QLD; R11; 2 | QLD; R12; 2 | WIN; R13; 8 | WIN; R14; 5 | WIN; R15; 3 | SAN; R16; 12 | SAN; R17; Ret | SAN; R18; DNS | BEN; R19; 8 | BEN; R20; 9 | BEN; R21; Ret | 9th | 326 |

Sporting positions
| Preceded by Jamie Spence | British Formula Ford Champion; 1993 | Succeeded by Jason Watt |
| Preceded by Jan Magnussen | Formula Ford Festival Winner; 1993 | Succeeded by Jason Watt |
| Preceded by Dick Johnson; John Bowe | Winner of the Bathurst 1000; 1995 (with Larry Perkins) | Succeeded by Craig Lowndes; Greg Murphy |
| Preceded by Craig Lowndes; Greg Murphy | Winner of the Bathurst Classic; 1997 (with Larry Perkins) | Succeeded by Jason Bright; Steven Richards |
| Preceded by Marcos Ambrose | Winner of the V8Supercar Championship Series; 2005 | Succeeded by Rick Kelly |
