= Ashley Stichbury =

Former New Zealand motor racing driver

- Nationality: (New Zealand) New Zealander
- Born: 5 August 1971 Havelock North, New Zealand
- Died: 17 May 2002 (aged 30) Auckland, New Zealand

V8 Supercars career
- Debut season: 2001
- Current team: Paul Morris Motorsport
- Car number: 29
- Starts: 1
- Wins: 0
- Poles: 0
- Fastest laps: 0
- Best finish: 49th in 2001

Previous series
- 2001-02 2001 1996-02 1993 1991-94: New Zealand V8 Touring Cars; V8 Supercars; TraNZam Championship; Formula Ford 1800 Germany; New Zealand Formula Ford Championship

Ashley James Stichbury (5 August 1971 – 17 May 2002), was a New Zealand motor racing driver.

== Career ==
Born in Hastings in 1971 to Paul and Susan-Jane, Stichbury began his motor racing career at the age of 14 through karting. After winning multiple titles throughout New Zealand and Australia, Stichbury began his foray into cars, competing in the New Zealand Formula Ford Championship. Stichbury would finish second overall in his debut season and drew the attention of Austrian Walter Lechner, who would offer Stichbury a car for the World Formula Ford Festival and the next season of the New Zealand Formula Ford Championship in lieu of helping Alexander Wurz in the German Formula Ford Championship.

Following a successful campaign in Europe, Stichbury returned to New Zealand and would win the New Zealand Formula Ford Championship in both 1993 and 1994. To this day, Stichbury remains the only driver to win the New Zealand Formula Ford title on two consecutive occasions.

After a deal to return to Europe did not come to fruition, Stichbury turned his attention to touring cars and the national Trans-Am series (branded in New Zealand as 'TraNZam'). Stichbury maintained a dominant reign whenever he was racing and captured the 2000-01 TraNZam title after winning nine of the 13 race. Following these strong performances, Stichbury was drafted into the Paul Morris Motorsport outfit for the 2001 V8 Supercar 1000 to partner Paul Morris, replacing original co-driver Matt Neal.

Later in 2001, the first season of the New Zealand V8 Touring Car Championship was run, and Stichbury dominated the season. After winning 12 out of the 18 races held and setting the fastest lap in every race, Stichbury became the first champion of the series. It would also turn out to be his final championship victory.

Former teammate and Formula One driver Alexander Wurz regarded Stichbury as one of the two best drivers he had driven against - the other driver being three-time Formula One champion Ayrton Senna.

== Illness and death ==
Stichbury suffered a cerebral haemorrhage, after which he was placed on life support. He would pass away following a scan and operation at Auckland City Hospital in 2002. He was survived by his wife, Anna, and son, Zac. His son has since achieved success in karting.

== Racing record ==
=== Career summary ===
Season	Series	Team	Races	Wins	Poles	F. Laps	Podiums	Points	Position
1990–91	New Zealand Formula Ford Championship		?	?	?	?	?	?	N/A
1991–92	New Zealand Formula Ford Championship	Richard Lester	18	?	?	?	?	?	2nd
1992–93	New Zealand Formula Ford Championship		?	?	?	?	?	?	1st
1993	German Formula Ford Championship	Swift Cars	2	?	?	?	?	?	N/A
1993–94	New Zealand Formula Ford Championship		14	?	?	?	?	?	1st
1996–97	TraNZam Championship		9	1	0	0	1	?	N/A
1998–99	TraNZam Lights		3	1	0	0	3	135	2nd
2000–01	TraNZam Chmapionship	Mark Petch Motorsport	12	9	4	11	12	365	1st
2001	Shell Championship Series	Paul Morris Motorsport	1	0	0	0	0	252	49th
2001–02	TraNZam Championship	Mark Petch Motorsport	11	3	1	3	5	234	6th
2001–02	New Zealand V8 Touring Car Championship	Mark Petch Motorsport	17	11	3	7	15	486	1st

=== Complete Bathurst 1000 results ===
Year	Team	Car	Co-driver	Position	Laps
1998	Playscape Racing	Ford Falcon EL	(Australia) Mark McLaughlin (Australia) Kevin Waldock	DNF	40
2001	Paul Morris Motorsport	Holden Commodore VT	(Australia) Paul Morris	12th	159
