= Kevin McQuay =

Australian businessman (1950–2005)

- Born: 13 July 1950; Melbourne, Victoria, Australia
- Died: 5 December 2005 (aged 55); Gold Coast, Queensland, Australia
- Occupations: Television personality, entrepreneur
- Years active: 1992–2005
- Known for: Big Kev's Ltd
- Television: Good Morning Australia

Kevin McQuay (13 July 1950 – 5 December 2005), professionally known as Big Kev, was an Australian cleaning products entrepreneur.

== Television career ==
His career on television took off in the 1990s as a regular guest on the infomercial component of Good Morning Australia. The former Carey Grammar student built up a good rapport with its host Bert Newton.

McQuay was a flamboyant person who loved to drink and party with his brother "Little Steve", although this led him to getting multiple drink-driving charges; this included one reading of 0.121, more than twice the legal limit. At one point, in 2001, McQuay weighed 146 kilograms (322 lb). His catchphrases were "I'm excited!" and "Big Kev knows." He continued to appear on Good Morning Australia into the early to mid-2000s.

McQuay was well known in the V8 Supercar community as the sponsor of Paul Morris Motorsport during the 2000 and 2001 seasons.

== Big Kev's Ltd ==
Ultra laundry concentrate was one of the "exciting" cleaning products offered by Big Kev's, Ltd.

From 2001 to 2002, McQuay hit his peak as an advertiser, appearing on commercials promoting Big Kev's range of cleaning products for the kitchen and laundry. He appeared on television commercials wearing a big blue shirt with an Australian flag design, aiming to promote the fact that Big Kev's products were 100% Australian-owned and not run by overseas companies. At one point, he hosted a half-hour low-budget variety show on late-night television. In August 2001, McQuay floated his company, Big Kev's Ltd, on the Australian Stock Exchange. The company initially did well, but it eventually ran into major financial problems. In November 2004, McQuay resigned from the position of chairman of Big Kev's Ltd, deciding to cut his losses.

== Other work ==
In 2002, McQuay performed guest vocals for Australian extreme metal band Sadistik Exekution on the Fukk album. McQuay's vocals are heard in the song "Organised Sadistik Abuse".

== Death ==
McQuay died at aged 55 on 5 December 2005 in the Allamanda Private Hospital on the Gold Coast. The cause was confirmed as a heart attack resulting from a staph infection.
