= Weal =

Weal or WEAL may refer to:

- Happiness, positive or pleasant emotions ranging from contentment to intense joy
- Prosperity, the state of flourishing, thriving, good fortune or good social status
- Wealth, abundance of valuable resources or material possessions
- Well-being, a healthy, happy, and prosperous condition
- Welt (bruise), a ridge on the body caused by a blow
- WEAL, a gospel-themed AM radio station broadcasting from Greensboro, North Carolina, United States
- Weal, Virginia
- Women's Equity Action League, a United States women's rights organization founded in 1968 and disbanded in 1989

== People with the surname ==
- Jordan Weal (born 1992), Canadian ice hockey player
- Nick Weal (born 1973), British tennis player
- Tom Weal (1929–2016), New Zealand politician

== See also ==
- Public weal
- Common Weal
- Commonweal (disambiguation)
- Wheal (disambiguation)
- Wheel (disambiguation)
