= Hot Wheels (disambiguation) =

Hot Wheels is a brand of toy cars developed and sold by American toy manufacturer Mattel.

Hot Wheels or Hotwheels may also refer to:

- Hot Wheels (video game), the inaugural racing video game based on the toy line published by Epyx in 1984 for the Commodore 64.
- Hot Wheels (TV series), an animated TV series based on the toy line aired from 1969 to 1971 on ABC(American Broadcasting Company).
- Hot Wheels: World Race, a 2003 animated, feature-length television film based on the toy line.
- Hot Wheels Battle Force 5, an animated television series based on the toy line first aired on Cartoon Network in the U.S. from 2009 to 2011.
- Fredrick Brennan (born 1994), nicknamed "Hotwheels", was an American software developer and founder of imageboard website 8chan.
- Hotwheels sisyphus, a species of spider in the monotypic genus Hotwheels

== See also ==
- Wheels (disambiguation)
- Wheel (disambiguation)
- Hot (disambiguation)
