= Wheeling Township =

Wheeling Township may refer to the following places:

- Wheeling Township, Cook County, Illinois
- Wheeling Township, Rice County, Minnesota
- Wheeling Township, Livingston County, Missouri
- Wheeling Township, Belmont County, Ohio
- Wheeling Township, Guernsey County, Ohio

See also

- Wheeling (disambiguation)
