= 2002 V8 Supercars Darwin round =

Auto Race

(Northern Territory) 2002 V8 Supercars Darwin round
Event Information
- Round 4 of 13 in the 2002 V8 Supercar Championship Series
- Date: 17–19 May 2002
- Location: Darwin, Northern Territory
- Venue: Hidden Valley Raceway
- Weather: Fine

Results
Race 1
Distance	20 laps	60 km
Pole position	Jason Bright; Holden Racing Team	1:07.8546
Winner	Jason Bright; Holden Racing Team	23:21.4643
Race 2
Distance	35 laps	100 km
Winner	Mark Skaife; Holden Racing Team	41:40.3634
Race 3
Distance	35 laps	100 km
Winner	Mark Skaife; Holden Racing Team	44:31.7508
Round Results
First	Mark Skaife; Holden Racing Team	224 pts
Second	Jason Bright; Holden Racing Team	208 pts
Third	Greg Murphy; Tom Walkinshaw Racing Australia	135 pts

The 2002 V8 Supercars Darwin round was the fourth round of the 2002 V8 Supercar Championship Series. It was held on the weekend of 17 to 19 May on the Hidden Valley Raceway in Darwin, Northern Territory.

The Holden Racing Team continued their dominant championship form by sweeping all three races throughout the weekend. Jason Bright secured pole position and won the opening sprint race while teammate and championship leader Mark Skaife won the two 100 km races on Sunday to take overall round honours while Bright followed in behind the secure second. Their Tom Walkinshaw stablemate Greg Murphy rounded out the overall podium with teammate Todd Kelly finishing fourth overall.

Skaife's round victory had taken the defending champion to the 1000 point mark in the championship standings and almost double the points of nearest contender, Greg Murphy.

== Background ==
The event was held on the weekend of 17 to 19 May 2002. It was the fifth V8 Supercar event to be held at the Hidden Valley Raceway and consisted of one 60 km race followed by two 100 km races with compulsory pitstops.

Mark Skaife entered the round as the championship leader with a 410-point gap over nearest competitor, Greg Murphy. The winner of the 2001 event was Marcos Ambrose.

=== Entry list ===
There were 36 drivers entered into the event. The controversial pre-qualifying system in place for the first three rounds of the season was abolished preceding the Darwin event.

This round marked the final solo appearance for Wayne Gardner in the V8 Supercar series.

Stephen White replaced Steve Owen at Imrie Motorsport for this round.

Dugal McDougall would forego this round and wouldn't return to the championship until the Oran Park round in July.

== Race report ==
=== Qualifying ===
Mark Skaife secured provisional pole position over teammate Jason Bright by almost one tenth of a second.

Pos	No	Name	Team	Vehicle	Time
1	1	(Australia) Mark Skaife	Holden Racing Team	Holden Commodore (VX)	1:08.4712
2	2	(Australia) Jason Bright	Holden Racing Team	Holden Commodore (VX)	1:08.5688
3	51	(New Zealand) Greg Murphy	Tom Walkinshaw Racing Australia	Holden Commodore (VX)	1:08.5689
4	00	(Australia) Craig Lowndes	00 Motorsport	Ford Falcon (AU)	1:08.6869
5	16	(New Zealand) Steven Richards	Perkins Engineering	Holden Commodore (VX)	1:08.8209
6	9	(Australia) David Besnard	Stone Brothers Racing	Ford Falcon (AU)	1:08.8212
7	888	(Australia) John Bowe	Brad Jones Racing	Ford Falcon (AU)	1:08.8349
8	4	(Australia) Marcos Ambrose	Stone Brothers Racing	Ford Falcon (AU)	1:08.8790
9	21	(Australia) Brad Jones	Brad Jones Racing	Ford Falcon (AU)	1:08.8939
10	15	(Australia) Todd Kelly	Tom Walkinshaw Racing Australia	Holden Commodore (VX)	1:08.8975
11	02	(Australia) Rick Kelly	Holden Young Lions	Holden Commodore (VX)	1:08.9645
12	5	(Australia) Glenn Seton	Glenn Seton Racing	Ford Falcon (AU)	1:09.0021
13	17	(Australia) Steven Johnson	Dick Johnson Racing	Ford Falcon (AU)	1:09.0026
14	34	(Australia) Garth Tander	Garry Rogers Motorsport	Holden Commodore (VX)	1:09.0379
15	8	(Australia) Russell Ingall	Perkins Engineering	Holden Commodore (VX)	1:09.0402
16	600	(New Zealand) Simon Wills	Briggs Motorsport	Ford Falcon (AU)	1:09.0684
17	10	(Australia) Mark Larkham	Larkham Motorsport	Ford Falcon (AU)	1:09.0796
18	35	(Australia) Jason Bargwanna	Garry Rogers Motorsport	Holden Commodore (VX)	1:09.0954
19	18	(New Zealand) Paul Radisich	Dick Johnson Racing	Ford Falcon (AU)	1:09.1266
20	65	(Brazil) Max Wilson	Briggs Motorsport	Ford Falcon (AU)	1:09.2005
21	36	(Australia) Wayne Gardner	Stone Brothers Racing	Ford Falcon (AU)	1:09.3159
22	3	(Australia) Cameron McConville	Lansvale Racing Team	Holden Commodore (VX)	1:09.3704
23	11	(Australia) Larry Perkins	Perkins Engineering	Holden Commodore (VX)	1:09.3778
24	31	(Australia) Steven Ellery	Steven Ellery Racing	Ford Falcon (AU)	1:09.4038
25	54	(New Zealand) Craig Baird	Rod Nash Racing	Holden Commodore (VX)	1:09.4475
26	29	(Australia) Paul Morris	Paul Morris Motorsport	Holden Commodore (VX)	1:09.4723
27	46	(New Zealand) John Faulkner	John Faulkner Racing	Holden Commodore (VX)	1:09.4831
28	7	(Australia) Rodney Forbes	00 Motorsport	Ford Falcon (AU)	1:09.4892
29	43	(Australia) Paul Weel	Paul Weel Racing	Ford Falcon (AU)	1:09.5491
30	40	(Australia) Cameron McLean	Paragon Motorsport	Ford Falcon (AU)	1:09.6092
31	24	(Australia) Paul Romano	Romano Racing	Holden Commodore (VX)	1:09.6101
32	66	(Australia) Tony Longhurst	Briggs Motorsport	Ford Falcon (AU)	1:09.6554
33	27	(Australia) Neil Crompton	00 Motorsport	Ford Falcon (AU)	1:09.6969
34	021	(New Zealand) Jason Richards	Team Kiwi Racing	Holden Commodore (VT)	1:09.7158
35	75	(Australia) Anthony Tratt	Paul Little Racing	Ford Falcon (AU)	1:09.9164
36	14	(Australia) Stephen White	Imrie Motorsport	Holden Commodore (VX)	1:11.4550

=== Top ten shootout ===
Pos	No	Name	Team	Vehicle	Time
1	2	(Australia) Jason Bright	Holden Racing Team	Holden Commodore (VX)	1:07.8546
2	1	(Australia) Mark Skaife	Holden Racing Team	Holden Commodore (VX)	1:08.0830
3	4	(Australia) Marcos Ambrose	Stone Brothers Racing	Ford Falcon (AU)	1:08.4780
4	51	(New Zealand) Greg Murphy	Tom Walkinshaw Racing Australia	Holden Commodore (VX)	1:08.7407
5	00	(Australia) Craig Lowndes	00 Motorsport	Ford Falcon (AU)	1:08.8112
6	15	(Australia) Todd Kelly	Tom Walkinshaw Racing Australia	Holden Commodore (VX)	1:08.8576
7	9	(Australia) David Besnard	Stone Brothers Racing	Ford Falcon (AU)	1:08.8654
8	888	(Australia) John Bowe	Brad Jones Racing	Ford Falcon (AU)	1:08.9726
9	21	(Australia) Brad Jones	Brad Jones Racing	Ford Falcon (AU)	1:09.2271
10	16	(New Zealand) Steven Richards	Perkins Engineering	Holden Commodore (VX)	1:14.4675

=== Race 1 ===
Pos	No	Name	Team	Vehicle	Laps	Time/Retired	Grid
1	2	(Australia) Jason Bright	Holden Racing Team	Holden Commodore (VX)	20	23:21.4643	2
2	1	(Australia) Mark Skaife	Holden Racing Team	Holden Commodore (VX)	20	+ 1.465	1
3	4	(Australia) Marcos Ambrose	Stone Brothers Racing	Ford Falcon (AU)	20	+ 2.909	3
4	51	(New Zealand) Greg Murphy	Tom Walkinshaw Racing Australia	Holden Commodore (VX)	20	+ 7.041	4
5	15	(Australia) Todd Kelly	Tom Walkinshaw Racing Australia	Holden Commodore (VX)	20	+ 9.946	6
6	00	(Australia) Craig Lowndes	00 Motorsport	Ford Falcon (AU)	20	+ 10.596	5
7	16	(New Zealand) Steven Richards	Perkins Engineering	Holden Commodore (VX)	20	+ 14.741	10
8	888	(Australia) John Bowe	Brad Jones Racing	Ford Falcon (AU)	20	+ 16.864	8
9	9	(Australia) David Besnard	Stone Brothers Racing	Ford Falcon (AU)	20	+ 17.176	7
10	5	(Australia) Glenn Seton	Glenn Seton Racing	Ford Falcon (AU)	20	+ 17.780	12
11	21	(Australia) Brad Jones	Brad Jones Racing	Ford Falcon (AU)	20	+ 21.625	9
12	02	(Australia) Rick Kelly	Holden Young Lions	Holden Commodore (VX)	20	+ 26.053	11
13	35	(Australia) Jason Bargwanna	Garry Rogers Motorsport	Holden Commodore (VX)	20	+ 26.995	18
14	17	(Australia) Steven Johnson	Dick Johnson Racing	Ford Falcon (AU)	20	+ 28.385	13
15	34	(Australia) Garth Tander	Garry Rogers Motorsport	Holden Commodore (VX)	20	+ 29.203	14
16	10	(Australia) Mark Larkham	Larkham Motorsport	Ford Falcon (AU)	20	+ 29.686	17
17	18	(New Zealand) Paul Radisich	Dick Johnson Racing	Ford Falcon (AU)	20	+ 30.119	19
18	65	(Brazil) Max Wilson	Briggs Motorsport	Ford Falcon (AU)	20	+ 34.187	20
19	31	(Australia) Steven Ellery	Steven Ellery Racing	Ford Falcon (AU)	20	+ 34.500	24
20	29	(Australia) Paul Morris	Paul Morris Motorsport	Holden Commodore (VX)	20	+ 35.044	26
21	11	(Australia) Larry Perkins	Perkins Engineering	Holden Commodore (VX)	20	+ 38.081	23
22	43	(Australia) Paul Weel	Paul Weel Racing	Ford Falcon (AU)	20	+ 38.440	29
23	3	(Australia) Cameron McConville	Lansvale Racing Team	Holden Commodore (VX)	20	+ 39.680	22
24	66	(Australia) Tony Longhurst	Briggs Motorsport	Ford Falcon (AU)	20	+ 39.996	32
25	46	(New Zealand) John Faulkner	John Faulkner Racing	Holden Commodore (VX)	20	+ 40.318	27
26	54	(New Zealand) Craig Baird	Rod Nash Racing	Holden Commodore (VX)	20	+ 43.100	25
27	021	(New Zealand) Jason Richards	Team Kiwi Racing	Holden Commodore (VT)	20	+ 44.441	34
28	600	(New Zealand) Simon Wills	Briggs Motorsport	Ford Falcon (AU)	20	+ 46.639	16
29	40	(Australia) Cameron McLean	Paragon Motorsport	Ford Falcon (AU)	20	+ 49.830	30
30	75	(Australia) Anthony Tratt	Paul Little Racing	Ford Falcon (AU)	20	+ 50.117	35
31	24	(Australia) Paul Romano	Romano Racing	Holden Commodore (VX)	20	+ 56.548	31
32	7	(Australia) Rodney Forbes	00 Motorsport	Ford Falcon (AU)	20	+ 58.481	28
33	14	(Australia) Stephen White	Imrie Motorsport	Holden Commodore (VX)	19	+ 1 lap	36
34	36	(Australia) Wayne Gardner	Stone Brothers Racing	Ford Falcon (AU)	19	+ 1 lap	21
Ret	8	(Australia) Russell Ingall	Perkins Engineering	Holden Commodore (VX)	10	Engine	15
Ret	27	(Australia) Neil Crompton	00 Motorsport	Ford Falcon (AU)	8	Retired	33
Fastest Lap: Jason Bright (Holden Racing Team) - 1:09.0966 on lap 3

=== Race 2 ===
Pos	No	Name	Team	Vehicle	Laps	Time/Retired	Grid
1	1	(Australia) Mark Skaife	Holden Racing Team	Holden Commodore (VX)	35	41:40.3634	2
2	2	(Australia) Jason Bright	Holden Racing Team	Holden Commodore (VX)	35	+ 4.176	1
3	15	(Australia) Todd Kelly	Tom Walkinshaw Racing Australia	Holden Commodore (VX)	35	+ 9.609	5
4	51	(New Zealand) Greg Murphy	Tom Walkinshaw Racing Australia	Holden Commodore (VX)	35	+ 10.099	4
5	9	(Australia) David Besnard	Stone Brothers Racing	Ford Falcon (AU)	35	+ 14.820	9
6	16	(New Zealand) Steven Richards	Perkins Engineering	Holden Commodore (VX)	35	+ 19.379	7
7	34	(Australia) Garth Tander	Garry Rogers Motorsport	Holden Commodore (VX)	35	+ 26.070	15
8	35	(Australia) Jason Bargwanna	Garry Rogers Motorsport	Holden Commodore (VX)	35	+ 29.565	13
9	4	(Australia) Marcos Ambrose	Stone Brothers Racing	Ford Falcon (AU)	35	+ 29.895	3
10	21	(Australia) Brad Jones	Brad Jones Racing	Ford Falcon (AU)	35	+ 30.261	11
11	5	(Australia) Glenn Seton	Glenn Seton Racing	Ford Falcon (AU)	35	+ 48.863	10
12	43	(Australia) Paul Weel	Paul Weel Racing	Ford Falcon (AU)	35	+ 54.352	22
13	27	(Australia) Neil Crompton	00 Motorsport	Ford Falcon (AU)	35	+ 54.770	36
14	10	(Australia) Mark Larkham	Larkham Motorsport	Ford Falcon (AU)	35	+ 56.957	16
15	54	(New Zealand) Craig Baird	Rod Nash Racing	Holden Commodore (VX)	35	+ 57.612	26
16	36	(Australia) Wayne Gardner	Stone Brothers Racing	Ford Falcon (AU)	35	+ 57.814	34
17	600	(New Zealand) Simon Wills	Briggs Motorsport	Ford Falcon (AU)	35	+ 1:00.333	28
18	24	(Australia) Paul Romano	Romano Racing	Holden Commodore (VX)	35	+ 1:02.537	31
19	3	(Australia) Cameron McConville	Lansvale Racing Team	Holden Commodore (VX)	35	+ 1:02.817	23
20	66	(Australia) Tony Longhurst	Briggs Motorsport	Ford Falcon (AU)	35	+ 1:03.677	24
21	75	(Australia) Anthony Tratt	Paul Little Racing	Ford Falcon (AU)	35	+ 1:10.697	30
22	65	(Brazil) Max Wilson	Briggs Motorsport	Ford Falcon (AU)	34	+ 1 lap	18
23	11	(Australia) Larry Perkins	Perkins Engineering	Holden Commodore (VX)	34	+ 1 lap	21
24	40	(Australia) Cameron McLean	Paragon Motorsport	Ford Falcon (AU)	34	+ 1 lap	29
25	021	(New Zealand) Jason Richards	Team Kiwi Racing	Holden Commodore (VT)	34	+ 1 lap	27
26	31	(Australia) Steven Ellery	Steven Ellery Racing	Ford Falcon (AU)	34	+ 1 lap	19
27	18	(New Zealand) Paul Radisich	Dick Johnson Racing	Ford Falcon (AU)	34	+ 1 lap	17
28	14	(Australia) Stephen White	Imrie Motorsport	Holden Commodore (VX)	33	+ 2 laps	33
29	888	(Australia) John Bowe	Brad Jones Racing	Ford Falcon (AU)	33	+ 2 laps	8
Ret	17	(Australia) Steven Johnson	Dick Johnson Racing	Ford Falcon (AU)	26	Wheel	14
Ret	29	(Australia) Paul Morris	Paul Morris Motorsport	Holden Commodore (VX)	22	Retired	20
Ret	00	(Australia) Craig Lowndes	00 Motorsport	Ford Falcon (AU)	1	Suspension	6
DNS	02	(Australia) Rick Kelly	Holden Young Lions	Holden Commodore (VX)	0	Did not start	12
DNS	46	(New Zealand) John Faulkner	John Faulkner Racing	Holden Commodore (VX)	0	Did not start	25
DNS	7	(Australia) Rodney Forbes	00 Motorsport	Ford Falcon (AU)	0	Did not start	32
DNS	8	(Australia) Russell Ingall	Perkins Engineering	Holden Commodore (VX)	0	Did not start	35
Fastest Lap: Jason Bright (Holden Racing Team) - 1:09.0658 on lap 5

=== Race 3 ===
Pos	No	Name	Team	Vehicle	Laps	Time/Retired	Grid
1	1	(Australia) Mark Skaife	Holden Racing Team	Holden Commodore (VX)	35	44:31.7508	1
2	2	(Australia) Jason Bright	Holden Racing Team	Holden Commodore (VX)	35	+ 0.310	2
3	51	(New Zealand) Greg Murphy	Tom Walkinshaw Racing Australia	Holden Commodore (VX)	35	+ 1.008	4
4	16	(New Zealand) Steven Richards	Perkins Engineering	Holden Commodore (VX)	35	+ 2.349	6
5	4	(Australia) Marcos Ambrose	Stone Brothers Racing	Ford Falcon (AU)	35	+ 6.150	9
6	15	(Australia) Todd Kelly	Tom Walkinshaw Racing Australia	Holden Commodore (VX)	35	+ 6.602	3
7	9	(Australia) David Besnard	Stone Brothers Racing	Ford Falcon (AU)	35	+ 7.292	5
8	34	(Australia) Garth Tander	Garry Rogers Motorsport	Holden Commodore (VX)	35	+ 7.532	7
9	8	(Australia) Russell Ingall	Perkins Engineering	Holden Commodore (VX)	35	+ 8.013	33
10	21	(Australia) Brad Jones	Brad Jones Racing	Ford Falcon (AU)	35	+ 8.584	10
11	5	(Australia) Glenn Seton	Glenn Seton Racing	Ford Falcon (AU)	35	+ 9.400	11
12	17	(Australia) Steven Johnson	Dick Johnson Racing	Ford Falcon (AU)	35	+ 11.732	30
13	35	(Australia) Jason Bargwanna	Garry Rogers Motorsport	Holden Commodore (VX)	35	+ 12.186	8
14	65	(Brazil) Max Wilson	Briggs Motorsport	Ford Falcon (AU)	35	+ 13.987	22
15	27	(Australia) Neil Crompton	00 Motorsport	Ford Falcon (AU)	35	+ 14.239	13
16	31	(Australia) Steven Ellery	Steven Ellery Racing	Ford Falcon (AU)	35	+ 14.725	26
17	10	(Australia) Mark Larkham	Larkham Motorsport	Ford Falcon (AU)	35	+ 15.110	14
18	11	(Australia) Larry Perkins	Perkins Engineering	Holden Commodore (VX)	35	+ 15.501	23
19	40	(Australia) Cameron McLean	Paragon Motorsport	Ford Falcon (AU)	35	+ 19.336	24
20	66	(Australia) Tony Longhurst	Briggs Motorsport	Ford Falcon (AU)	35	+ 19.709	20
21	75	(Australia) Anthony Tratt	Paul Little Racing	Ford Falcon (AU)	35	+ 52.331	21
22	54	(New Zealand) Craig Baird	Rod Nash Racing	Holden Commodore (VX)	35	+ 21.192	15
23	021	(New Zealand) Jason Richards	Team Kiwi Racing	Holden Commodore (VT)	35	+ 21.456	25
24	36	(Australia) Wayne Gardner	Stone Brothers Racing	Ford Falcon (AU)	35	+ 28.823	16
25	888	(Australia) John Bowe	Brad Jones Racing	Ford Falcon (AU)	35	+ 34.811	29
26	600	(New Zealand) Simon Wills	Briggs Motorsport	Ford Falcon (AU)	34	+ 1 lap	17
27	14	(Australia) Stephen White	Imrie Motorsport	Holden Commodore (VX)	34	+ 1 lap	28
28	24	(Australia) Paul Romano	Romano Racing	Holden Commodore (VX)	34	+ 1 lap	18
29	3	(Australia) Cameron McConville	Lansvale Racing Team	Holden Commodore (VX)	29	+ 6 laps	19
Ret	43	(Australia) Paul Weel	Paul Weel Racing	Ford Falcon (AU)	22	Retired	12
Ret	00	(Australia) Craig Lowndes	00 Motorsport	Ford Falcon (AU)	17	Retired	32
Ret	29	(Australia) Paul Morris	Paul Morris Motorsport	Holden Commodore (VX)	11	Retired	31
Ret	18	(New Zealand) Paul Radisich	Dick Johnson Racing	Ford Falcon (AU)	7	Retired	27
DNS	02	(Australia) Rick Kelly	Holden Young Lions	Holden Commodore (VX)	0	Did not start	
DNS	46	(New Zealand) John Faulkner	John Faulkner Racing	Holden Commodore (VX)	0	Did not start	
DNS	7	(Australia) Rodney Forbes	00 Motorsport	Ford Falcon (AU)	0	Did not start	
Fastest Lap: Jason Bright (Holden Racing Team) - 1:09.0802 on lap 6

== Championship standings ==
Pos.	No	Driver	Team	Pts
1	1	(Australia) Mark Skaife	Holden Racing Team	1044
3	51	(New Zealand) Greg Murphy	Tom Walkinshaw Racing Australia	577
3	4	(Australia) Marcos Ambrose	Stone Brothers Racing	508
4	15	(Australia) Todd Kelly	Tom Walkinshaw Racing Australia	459
5	2	(Australia) Jason Bright	Holden Racing Team	427
