= WEEL =

WEEL or Weel could refer to:

- Weel, a hamlet in the East Riding of Yorkshire, England
- weel, a type of fish trap
- WEEL (AM) – Dothan, Alabama Radio Station from 2007-2010 on 700 AM, now WARB
- WEEL-LD, a low-power television station (channel 22) licensed to serve Tuscaloosa, Alabama, United States; see List of television stations in Alabama
- WVKF, a radio station (95.7 FM) licensed to Shadyside, Ohio, United States, known as WEEL from 1990 to 2004
- WDCT, a radio station (1310 AM) licensed to Fairfax, Virginia, United States, known as WEEL from 1962 to 1985
- WEEL, acronym for "Workplace Environmental Exposure Level" see Threshold limit value

== People with the surname ==
- Allan Weel Simonsen – Danish racing driver (1978–2013)
- Arne Weel – Danish actor and film director
- David van Weel – Dutch civil servant and diplomat (born 1976)
- Diederik van Weel – Dutch field hockey player
- Eva Weel Skram – Norwegian vocalist, half of Eva & the Heartmaker (born 1985)
- Fleur van der Weel – Dutch illustrator (born 1970)
- Jørgen Weel – Danish actor (1922–1993)
- Liva Weel – Danish singer and actress
- Paul Weel – Australian racing driver (born 1979)
- Zoë van der Weel – British handball player (born 1990)

== See also ==
- Weel & Braken, Obdam – Postmill in Obdam, North Holland
- The Ne'er-do-Weel – Play by W. S. Gilbert
- Simonsen & Weel – Danish healthcare equipment supplier
- Wheel (disambiguation)
