= 2001 Shell Championship Series =

Motor racing competition

The 2001 Shell Championship Series was a premier Australian touring car competition, which commenced on March 24, 2001 at Phillip Island Grand Prix Circuit and concluded on December 2, 2001 at Sandown International Raceway, spanning 13 rounds. It was the third competition under the V8 Supercar name and the 42nd since the Australian Touring Car Championship's inception in 1960. It was also the first to feature an international round in New Zealand.

== Calendar ==
The 2001 Shell Championship Series consisted of 13 rounds, which included 7 pit-stop rounds of two or three races, two sprint races, two 2-driver races, and 2 1-driver endurance races.

Rd.	Race title Circuit	City / State	Date
1	Phillip Island Grand Prix Circuit	Phillip Island, Victoria	24–25 March
2	Clipsal 500, Adelaide Street Circuit	Adelaide, South Australia	6–8 April
3	Eastern Creek Raceway	Sydney, New South Wales	28–29 April
4	Hidden Valley Raceway	Darwin, Northern Territory	12–13 May
5	GMC 400, Canberra Street Circuit	Canberra, Australian Capital Territory	9–10 June
6	Barbagallo Raceway	Perth, Western Australia	22–24 June
7	Calder Park Raceway	Melbourne, Victoria	14–15 July
8	Oran Park Raceway	Sydney, New South Wales	28–29 July
9	VIP Petfoods Queensland 500, Queensland Raceway	Willowbank, Queensland	24–26 August
10	Winton Motor Raceway	Benalla, Victoria	8–9 September
11	V8 Supercar 1000, Mount Panorama Circuit	Bathurst, New South Wales	4–7 October
12	Boost Mobile V8 International, Pukekohe Park Raceway	Pukekohe, New Zealand	9–11 November
13	Australian V8 Ultimate, Sandown International Raceway	Melbourne, Victoria	1–2 December

Australian rounds
New Zealand rounds

=== Race formats ===
- 2 45-minute races (around 100 km) will replace the 3 20-minute sprint races. There will also be a compulsory pit stop that has to be taken within a certain time of the race
- There will be a Top 10 or Top 15 Shootout for all rounds during the season that will alternate from round to round. This involves a single lap around the circuit for the Top 10/15 qualifiers in qualifying. The winner of the shootout wins 18 bonus points
- 2 events will involve the 3 20-minute sprint races. This will happen at Round 6 and 7 at Barbagallo Raceway and Calder Park Raceway. There will be no compulsory pit stops
- At 3 events, there will be 3 races over the weekend, this will happen at Hidden Valley, Pukekoke Park Raceway and Sandown

==== Special events ====
Round 2-Clipsal 500 at Adelaide: This involves two 250 km races over 78 laps of the Adelaide Street circuit. The winner of the event is the driver who wins the second race and not the driver who collects the most points. The second race involves double points over the first race. There are two compulsory pit stops in each race, one stop for tyres and one stop for fuel.

Round 5-GMC 400 at Canberra: This involves two 100 km races and one 200 km race over 25 and 50 laps of the Canberra Street Circuit. The winner of the event is the driver who collects the most points over the weekend. The 2nd race of the weekend will involve a reverse grid of the entire field. The 3rd race grid will be a culmination of the points of race one and race two put together. In the first two races there will be only one compulsory stop for tyres. In the 3rd race, there will be one stop for tyres and one stop for fuel.

Round 9-VIP Petfoods Queensland 500 at Queensland Raceway: This is the first of the double driver endurance events. This race is held over 161 laps over 500 km. The race will involve driver changes and fuel and tyre stops will have to happen at the same time.

Round 11-V8 Supercar 1000 at Bathurst (Known as "The Great Race"): Bathurst is the event that all the drivers want to win. It is again a double driver event and will involve driver changes at pit stops. The race is held over 161 laps over 1000 km. This season is the first time that the event isn't the last round of the championship.

=== Television coverage ===
Channel 10 and Fox Sports broadcast the coverage for the 5th year since 1997 when they took over from Channel 7. Neil Crompton hosted the coverage for regular rounds with Barry Sheene. Bill Woods hosted the coverage at special events while Leigh Diffey hosted the coverage at the last 2 rounds. Matthew White hosted the coverage at Winton for the only time in the 2001 season. Neil Crompton, Barry Sheene and Mark Oastler commentated for most of the season with Leigh Diffey coming in from Queensland 500 onwards. Greg Rust and Grant Denyer were the pit lane reporters after Greg was commentator for the 2000 championship.

== Teams and drivers ==
The following drivers and teams competed in the 2001 Shell Championship Series. The series consisted of 11 rounds of single driver racing and two rounds (the Queensland 500 and the Bathurst 1000) of endurance racing with each car driven by two drivers.

Permanent entries
Manufacturer	Vehicle	Team	No.	Drivers	Events	Co-Drivers	Events
Ford	Falcon AU	Gibson Motorsport	00	(Australia) Craig Lowndes	All	(Australia) Neil Crompton	9, 11
Ford	Falcon AU	Gibson Motorsport	7	(Australia) Rodney Forbes	All	(Australia) David Parsons	9, 11
Ford	Falcon AU	Stone Brothers Racing	4	(Australia) Marcos Ambrose	All	(Australia) Greg Crick	9
Ford	Falcon AU	Stone Brothers Racing	4	(Australia) Marcos Ambrose	All	(Australia) Wayne Wakefield	11
Ford	Falcon AU	Stone Brothers Racing	9	(Australia) David Besnard	All	(Australia) Matthew White	9, 11
Ford	Falcon AU	Glenn Seton Racing	5	(Australia) Glenn Seton	All	(New Zealand) Steven Richards	9, 11
Ford	Falcon AU	Glenn Seton Racing	6	(New Zealand) Steven Richards	1–8, 10, 12–13	—N/a	
Ford	Falcon AU	Glenn Seton Racing	6	(New Zealand) Jim Richards	9, 11	(Australia) Dean Canto	9, 11
Ford	Falcon AU	Larkham Motorsport	10	(Australia) Mark Larkham	All	(Australia) Wayne Gardner	9, 11
Ford	Falcon AU	Dick Johnson Racing	17	(Australia) Steven Johnson	All	(New Zealand) Paul Radisich	9, 11
Ford	Falcon AU	Dick Johnson Racing	18	(New Zealand) Paul Radisich	1–8, 10, 12–13	—N/a	
Ford	Falcon AU	Dick Johnson Racing	18	(Australia) Greg Ritter	9, 11	(Australia) Paul Stokell	9
Ford	Falcon AU	Dick Johnson Racing	18	(Australia) Greg Ritter	9, 11	(Australia) Cameron McLean	11
Ford	Falcon AU	Brad Jones Racing	21	(Australia) Brad Jones	All	(United Kingdom) John Cleland	9, 11
Ford	Falcon AU	Steven Ellery Racing	31	(Australia) Steven Ellery	All	(Australia) Geoff Brabham	9, 11
Ford	Falcon AU	Paragon Racing	40	(Australia) Cameron McLean	1–8, 10	—N/a	
Ford	Falcon AU	Paul Weel Racing	43	(Australia) Paul Weel	All	(Australia) Tim Leahey	9, 11
Ford	Falcon AU	RPM International Racing	45	(Australia) Dean Canto	1–4, 7–8	—N/a	
Ford	Falcon AU	RPM International Racing	45	(Australia) Phillip Scifleet	9, 11	(Australia) Aaron McGill	9
Ford	Falcon AU	RPM International Racing	45	(Australia) Phillip Scifleet	9, 11	(Australia) Christian D'Agostin	11
Ford	Falcon AU	Paul Little Racing	75	(Australia) Anthony Tratt	All	(Australia) Alan Jones	9, 11
Ford	Falcon AU	Briggs Motorsport	600	(Australia) John Bowe	1–11	(New Zealand) Simon Wills	9, 11
Ford	Falcon AU	Briggs Motorsport	600	(New Zealand) Simon Wills	12–13	—N/a	
Holden	Commodore VS	Romano Racing	24	(Australia) Paul Romano	1, 3	—N/a	
Holden	Commodore VT	McDougall Motorsport	16	(Australia) Dugal McDougall	2, 7	—N/a	
Holden	Commodore VT	Team Kiwi Racing	021	(New Zealand) Jason Richards	All	(New Zealand) Angus Fogg	9, 11
Holden	Commodore VT	Romano Racing (TWR)	24	(Australia) Paul Romano	2, 4	—N/a	
Holden	Commodore VT	Paul Morris Motorsport	29	(Australia) Paul Morris	All	(United Kingdom) Matt Neal	9
Holden	Commodore VT	Paul Morris Motorsport	29	(Australia) Paul Morris	All	(New Zealand) Ashley Stichbury	11
Holden	Commodore VT	John Faulkner Racing	46	(New Zealand) John Faulkner	2–3, 5–13	(New Zealand) Craig Baird	9
Holden	Commodore VT	John Faulkner Racing	46	(New Zealand) John Faulkner	2–3, 5–13	(Australia) Peter Doulman	11
Holden	Commodore VT	Clive Wiseman Racing	50	(Australia) Tyler Mecklem	1–5, 7	—N/a	
Holden	Commodore VT	Clive Wiseman Racing	50	(Australia) Mick Donaher	8–9, 11	(Australia) Layton Crambrook	9, 11
Holden	Commodore VT	Clive Wiseman Racing	50	(Australia) Layton Crambrook	13	—N/a	
Holden	Commodore VX	Holden Racing Team (TWR)	1	(Australia) Mark Skaife	All	(Australia) Jason Bright	9
Holden	Commodore VX	Holden Racing Team (TWR)	1	(Australia) Mark Skaife	All	(Australia) Tony Longhurst	11
Holden	Commodore VX	Holden Racing Team (TWR)	2	(Australia) Jason Bright	1–8, 10–13	(Australia) Tomas Mezera	9, 11
Holden	Commodore VX	Holden Racing Team (TWR)	2	(Australia) Tony Longhurst	9	(Australia) Tomas Mezera	9, 11
Holden	Commodore VX	Lansvale Smash Repairs	3	(Australia) Cameron McConville	All	(Australia) Rick Bates	9, 11
Holden	Commodore VX	Perkins Engineering	8	(Australia) Russell Ingall	1–8, 10, 12–13	—N/a	
Holden	Commodore VX	Perkins Engineering	8	(Australia) Adam Macrow	9, 11	(Australia) Luke Youlden	9, 11
Holden	Commodore VX	Perkins Engineering	11	(Australia) Larry Perkins	All	(Australia) Russell Ingall	9, 11
Holden	Commodore VX	Imrie Motorsport	14	(Australia) Greg Ritter	1–2	—N/a	
Holden	Commodore VX	Imrie Motorsport	14	(Australia) Tomas Mezera	3, 7–8, 12–13	—N/a	
Holden	Commodore VX	Imrie Motorsport	14	(Australia) Christian D'Agostin	4	—N/a	
Holden	Commodore VX	Imrie Motorsport	14	(Australia) Tony Ricciardello	6	—N/a	
Holden	Commodore VX	Imrie Motorsport	14	(Australia) James Brock	9–11	(Australia) Steve Owen	9, 11
Holden	Commodore VX	K-Mart Racing Team (TWR)	15	(Australia) Todd Kelly	All	(New Zealand) Greg Murphy	9, 11
Holden	Commodore VX	K-Mart Racing Team (TWR)	51	(New Zealand) Greg Murphy	1–8, 10, 12–13	—N/a	
Holden	Commodore VX	K-Mart Racing Team (TWR)	51	(Australia) Rick Kelly	9, 11	(Australia) Nathan Pretty	9, 11
Holden	Commodore VX	McDougall Motorsport	16	(Australia) Dugal McDougall	1, 3–5, 8–11, 13	(Australia) Andrew Miedecke	9, 11
Holden	Commodore VX	Romano Racing (TWR)	24	(Australia) Paul Romano	5–7, 9–13	(Australia) Owen Kelly	9, 11
Holden	Commodore VX	Garry Rogers Motorsport	34	(Australia) Garth Tander	All	(Australia) Jason Bargwanna	9, 11
Holden	Commodore VX	Garry Rogers Motorsport	35	(Australia) Jason Bargwanna	1–8, 10, 12–13	—N/a	
Holden	Commodore VX	Garry Rogers Motorsport	35	(Australia) Paul Dumbrell	9, 11	(Australia) Leanne Ferrier	9, 11
Holden	Commodore VX	John Faulkner Racing	46	(New Zealand) John Faulkner	1, 4	—N/a	
Holden	Commodore VX	Rod Nash Racing	54	(Australia) Tony Longhurst	1–8, 10, 12–13	—N/a	
Holden	Commodore VX	Rod Nash Racing	54	(Australia) Rod Nash	9, 11	(Australia) Tony Ricciardello	9, 11
Part-time entries
Ford	Falcon EL	Emerzidis Motorsport	20	(Australia) Garry Holt	2, 8, 11	(Australia) Kevin Mundy	
Ford	Falcon EL	Sieders Racing Team	56	(Australia) Luke Sieders	8	—N/a	
Ford	Falcon AU	Terry Wyhoon Racing	25	(Australia) Terry Wyhoon	9, 11	(Australia) Rod Salmon	9, 11
Ford	Falcon AU	Halliday Motorsport	61	(Australia) Ross Halliday	11	(Australia) Greg Crick	11
Ford	Falcon AU	Harris Racing	88	(Australia) Craig Harris	9, 11	(Australia) Dale Brede	9
Ford	Falcon AU	Harris Racing	88	(Australia) Craig Harris	9, 11	(Australia) Michael Simpson	11
Ford	Falcon AU	Power Racing	500	(Australia) Alan Heath	2, 11	(Australia) Dale Brede	11
Ford	Falcon AU	Prancing Horse Racing	888	(Australia) Mark Noske	11	(New Zealand) Craig Baird	11
Holden	Commodore VS	Lansvale Smash Repairs	23	(Australia) Trevor Ashby	1–3, 6	—N/a	
Holden	Commodore VS	Lansvale Smash Repairs	23	(Australia) Steve Reed	4–5, 11	(Australia) Trevor Ashby	11
Holden	Commodore VS	Alan Taylor Racing	37	(Australia) Bill Attard	11	(Australia) Roger Hurd	11
Holden	Commodore VS	Matthew White Racing	76	(Australia) Matthew White	1–2, 4, 7, 13	—N/a	
Holden	Commodore VS	V8 Racing	77	(Australia) Steve Williams	8	—N/a	
Holden	Commodore VS	Miller Racing	84	(Australia) Daniel Miller	6	—N/a	
Holden	Commodore VS	Ric Shaw Motorsport	90	(Australia) Ric Shaw	11	(Australia) Mike Conway	11
Holden	Commodore VS	GM Motorsport	111	(Australia) Phonsy Mullan	7, 13	—N/a	
Holden	Commodore VT	Tomas Mezera Motorsport	32	(Australia) Tomas Mezera	1–2	—N/a	
Holden	Commodore VT	Melbourne's Cheapest Cars	48	(Australia) Eddie Abelnica	10	—N/a	
Holden	Commodore VT	Doulman Automotive	52	(Australia) Peter Doulman	3, 8	—N/a	
Holden	Commodore VT	Team Kiwi Racing	777	(New Zealand) Angus Fogg	2, 12	—N/a	
Holden	Commodore VX	Paul Morris Motorsport	67	(United Kingdom) Matt Neal	8	—N/a	
Holden	Commodore VX	Holden Young Lions (TWR)	255	(Australia) Rick Kelly	13	—N/a	

=== Driver changes ===
- After racing for the Holden Racing Team since 1994, Craig Lowndes moved to the newly created Ford team formed from the formerly Holden aligned Gibson Motorsport and acquired privateers front runner Rodney Forbes as a teammate. In between his Channel Ten commentary commitments, Neil Crompton joined the team for the enduros.
- Jason Bright replaced Lowndes in the number 2 Holden Racing Team car.
- Rookie Marcos Ambrose and V8 Lites series driver David Besnard joined the series with Stone Brothers Racing. Tony Longhurst found a drive with Rod Nash Racing and joined HRT for the long-distance races, while Craig Baird sat idle until the enduros.
- Sacked Gibson Motorsport driver Greg Murphy joined the former Holden Young Lions squad with new sponsor Kmart, he joined Todd Kelly at the team.
- Fellow superseded GMS driver Steven Richards, joined Ford Tickford Racing.
- As part of a franchise deal arrangement the Holden Young Lions identity passed to privateer outfit Romano Racing who ran Paul Romano.
- Cameron McConville joined the re-launched Lansvale Racing Team as a lead driver while owners Steve Reed and Trevor Ashby shared an older VS Commodore.

=== Team changes ===
- After running Holden Since 1993 .Gibson Motorsport switched to Ford
- Romano Racing became Holden Young Lions and ran an ex-HRT VT Commodore

== Season review ==
=== Phillip Island, Victoria ===
Mark Skaife got off to the best start possible, collecting the maximum points at Phillip Island, with Craig Lowndes finishing second on his debut for Ford, thanks to the fastest pit stops of the weekend by his crew. Jason Bright finished third in his comeback to the sport.

=== Adelaide, South Australia ===
At the next round in Adelaide, Bright wins the round and the double points race after coming from the back of the field following an accident on lap 1, leaving him at the top of the championship. Mark Skaife has a rough weekend, finishing fourth after being spun by Paul Radisich in Race 1, and suffering another spin in Race 2, leaving him in ninth place. Craig Lowndes won the Saturday race but tangled with Skaife in Race 2, disabling his car and causing him to fall behind in the championship. Paul Radisich had the fastest car of the weekend, but an axle failure in Race 1 and steering damage left him struggling in the championship. Russell Ingall had a solid weekend, finishing with a third and a second place. There was significant controversy over the race officials, as rule-breaking went unpunished, and they were under scrutiny at Eastern Creek.

=== Eastern Creek, New South Wales ===
Craig Lowndes and Marcos Ambrose came first and second in the first race but got penalised because of incidents. Craig passed under a Yellow Flag that he could not see and Marcos made an illegal pass on Greg Murphy. This left Greg Murphy 1st on the grid for Race 2 and Mark Skaife second who started tenth in race 1 after he spun in the shootout. Greg Murphy lost his lead to Skaife after he was given a stop-go penalty for jumping the start, but there was more controversy after he didn't come to a complete stop. He got away with it but the rules were changed for the next round. Mark Skaife duly took out the race and round with teammate Jason Bright second but still leading the championship. Greg Murphy came third for the round even with the penalty.

=== Hidden Valley, Northern Territory ===
The next round at Hidden Valley turned out to be the car breaker of the year, with Greg Murphy and Russell Ingall having mechanical problems while leading within sight of the flag in Race 3 and 2 respectively. Mark Skaife had a stop-go penalty for jumping the start in Race 1 which left him 12th but still recovered to win Race 3 and come third in the round. Jason Bright had another solid weekend coming second and extending his championship lead over his teammate. But it was Marcos Ambrose who kept his nose clean over the weekend to take the round win in only his fourth championship round.

=== Canberra, ACT ===
The GMC 400 was the turning point of the season for Mark Skaife as he came third on the weekend and overtook teammate Jason Bright, who had a difficult weekend. The DJR cars were the cars to have earlier in the weekend as Paul Radisich and Steven Johnson finished 1–2 in qualifying but Radisich spun out in his shootout lap, leaving him 15th and Steven Johnson claiming his first pole position in the series. New for the championship were the pit lane speed limiters restricted to 40 km/h and only one pit bay per team. Steven Johnson wins the first race from Craig Lowndes who was advantaged bt a clear pit lane. Mark Skaife finished 3rd after starting 5th. Marcos Ambrose retires from the race with a broken driveshaft and will start from the back of the grid. The 2nd race is a reverse grid with Steve Reed and Steven Richards starting on the front row. Steven Richards wins from Marcos Ambrose who has a brilliant race which he started from the back but in race 3 he will have to start from the back again. Mark Skaife has a difficult race when he ran into the back of Rodney Forbes in a concertina effect and finished 24th and will start 10th in race 3. The race 3 grid is decided by an aggregate of points accumulated in race 1 and 2 which means that the front row is Craig Lowndes and Paul Radisich. Mark Skaife wins the race with Garth Tander second and Steve Johnson 3rd. Craig Lowndes was leading until a safety car came out with a pit stop still to go. He eventually retired with fuel pressure problems. Steve Johnson won the round with Garth Tander second and Mark Skaife 3rd.

=== Barbagallo, Western Australia ===
Paul Radisich dominated the weekend, winning the shootout and Race 1, 2, and 3. Mark Skaife consolidated his championship lead with 2nd place in all three races, while Greg Murphy finished 3rd overall. Russell Ingall saw his chance of a podium dashed when he jumped the start in Race 3 and ended up 4th overall.

=== Calder Park, Victoria ===
Paul Morris won his first ever V8 Supercar event as the Big Kev Racer was on the pace from the start of the weekend. Mark Skaife started on Pole but a poor start left him vulnerable to Steven Johnson, who he tapped to give him the lead, but he was issued with a stop-go penalty giving Johnson the lead he never relinquished. Paul Morris came 2nd and Marcos Ambrose 3rd. Paul Morris reverted to blocking in the final 2 races to win both, Russell Ingall finished 2nd in race 2 with Jason Bright 3rd and in race 3, Paul Radisich finished 2nd with Russell Ingall 3rd. Overall for the weekend, Steven Johnson finished 2nd with Russell Ingall 3rd. Mark Skaife finished 14th overall after a spin in race 3.

=== Oran Park, New South Wales ===
Mark Skaife comes back from a difficult Calder with a win in both races after starting 2nd. Craig Lowndes claims the pole, but finished 2nd in race 1 and 8th in race 2 after a spin by Garth Tander but still finishes 3rd overall. David Besnard has a fantastic round as he finishes 3rd and 2nd for a 2nd overall as teammate Marcos Ambrose struggles to get to grips with the track.

=== Queensland 500, Queensland ===
The first two-driver Enduro provided plenty of thrills, spills, and a dramatic ending. A huge thunderstorm hit as Steven Johnson and Paul Radisich won the race from the gravel trap, but they were lucky as the red flag came out, reverting the result to the previous lap. Russell Ingall and Larry Perkins finished 2nd, while Todd Kelly and Greg Murphy took 3rd. Mark Skaife and Jason Bright finished 4th, despite having oil on the screen for part of the race.

=== Winton, Victoria ===
Russell Ingall took another step forward in his championship fight by securing his first round win of the season and claiming his first pole position of his career. Greg Murphy won Race 1, but a slow pit stop in Race 2 dropped him to 6th, though he still finished 2nd overall for the weekend. Mark Skaife finished 3rd overall after starting 15th following a poor qualifying session. Marcos Ambrose was the fastest Ford of the weekend, passing car after car after running off-track on the first corner.

=== V8 Supercar 1000, Bathurst, New South Wales ===
Mark Skaife took a significant step toward the championship with his win at Bathurst alongside Tony Longhurst. The Drive of the Day award went to Brad Jones and John Cleland, who started 21st and finished 2nd, despite radio issues that caused Cleland to miss the safety car period. They lost out by just a few seconds. Todd Kelly and Greg Murphy finished 3rd, having stayed in the top 3 all day. They could have won if Todd hadn't spun on a slippery track coming into the last pit stop at the chase. Russell Ingall overtook Jason Bright for 2nd place in the championship after Jason failed to finish alongside Tomas Mezera. Russell and Larry Perkins led heading into the final pit stop, but Larry crashed while entering the pit lane, damaging the front spoiler. They eventually finished 8th. Pole-sitter Marcos Ambrose fell through the field, and after overcooking his entry into the pit lane at the first stop, he got stuck in the gravel and retired. Greg Ritter and Cameron McLean finished 4th after a strong race with a fast car. Paul Radisich and Steven Johnson retired due to an engine failure during a safety car period.

=== Boost Mobile V8 International, Pukekohe, New Zealand ===
In the first-ever overseas event for the series, Greg Murphy earned maximum points on home turf. Mark Skaife clinches the championship in the first race, finishing ahead of Russell Ingall, who faced several gearbox issues. Marcos Ambrose finished third but lacked the pace of the leading Holdens.

=== Sandown, Victoria ===
Todd Kelly wins his first-ever championship round, securing victory in race 2 and delivering other consistent results. Mark Skaife wins the first race in dry conditions but struggles in the wet and ultimately retires from race 3 following contact with Steven Richards. Craig Lowndes wins the third race, finishing ahead of Marcos Ambrose.

=== Overall ===
Mark Skaife wins the series for the fourth time, finishing ahead of Russell Ingall. Jason Bright takes third, ahead of Greg Murphy. The top Ford driver is Steven Johnson. Todd Kelly finishes sixth, thanks to a strong final round, ahead of Paul Radisich, who had some solid performances throughout the season. Marcos Ambrose is awarded Rookie of the Year after finishing eighth, though he would likely regret his performance in the endurance races, where he earned only 112 points. Steve Ellery, the highest-placing driver from a single-car team, takes ninth, while Garth Tander finishes tenth after a challenging year. Craig Lowndes concludes his first year with Ford in eleventh place.

== Results and standings ==
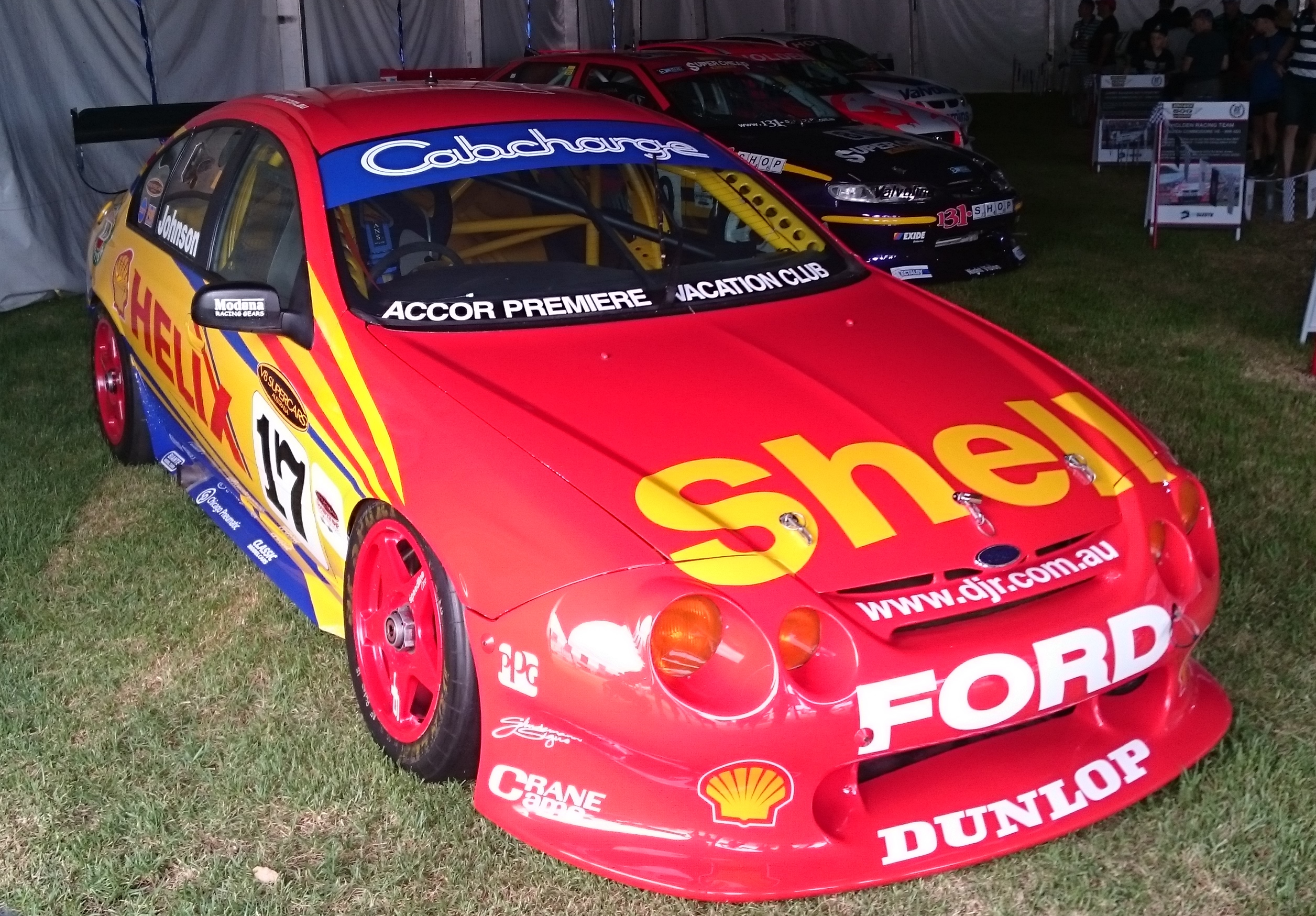
The Ford Falcon AU with which Steven Johnson and Paul Radisich won the 2001 Queensland 500. The car is pictured in 2018

=== Results summary ===
Round	Race	Event	Pole position	Race winners	Round winner	Report
1	R1	Phillip Island	(Australia) Mark Skaife	(Australia) Mark Skaife	(Australia) Mark Skaife (Holden Racing Team, Holden)	report
1	R2	Phillip Island		(Australia) Mark Skaife	(Australia) Mark Skaife (Holden Racing Team, Holden)	report
2	R1	Adelaide	(New Zealand) Greg Murphy	(Australia) Craig Lowndes	(Australia) Jason Bright (Holden Racing Team, Holden)	report
2	R2	Adelaide		(Australia) Jason Bright	(Australia) Jason Bright (Holden Racing Team, Holden)	report
3	R1	Eastern Creek	(Australia) Marcos Ambrose	(New Zealand) Greg Murphy	(Australia) Mark Skaife (Holden Racing Team, Holden)	report
3	R2	Eastern Creek		(Australia) Mark Skaife	(Australia) Mark Skaife (Holden Racing Team, Holden)	report
4	R1	Darwin	(Australia) Mark Skaife	(Australia) Russell Ingall	(Australia) Marcos Ambrose (Stone Brothers Racing, Ford)	report
4	R2	Darwin		(New Zealand) Greg Murphy	(Australia) Marcos Ambrose (Stone Brothers Racing, Ford)	report
4	R3	Darwin		(Australia) Mark Skaife	(Australia) Marcos Ambrose (Stone Brothers Racing, Ford)	report
5	R1	Canberra	(Australia) Steven Johnson	(Australia) Steven Johnson	(Australia) Steven Johnson (Dick Johnson Racing, Ford)	report
5	R2	Canberra		(New Zealand) Steven Richards	(Australia) Steven Johnson (Dick Johnson Racing, Ford)	report
5	R3	Canberra		(Australia) Mark Skaife	(Australia) Steven Johnson (Dick Johnson Racing, Ford)	report
6	R1	Perth	(New Zealand) Paul Radisich	(New Zealand) Paul Radisich	(New Zealand) Paul Radisich (Dick Johnson Racing, Ford)	report
6	R2	Perth		(New Zealand) Paul Radisich	(New Zealand) Paul Radisich (Dick Johnson Racing, Ford)	report
6	R3	Perth		(New Zealand) Paul Radisich	(New Zealand) Paul Radisich (Dick Johnson Racing, Ford)	report
7	R1	Calder Park	(Australia) Mark Skaife	(Australia) Steven Johnson	(Australia) Paul Morris (Paul Morris Motorsport, Holden)	report
7	R2	Calder Park		(Australia) Paul Morris	(Australia) Paul Morris (Paul Morris Motorsport, Holden)	report
7	R3	Calder Park		(Australia) Paul Morris	(Australia) Paul Morris (Paul Morris Motorsport, Holden)	report
8	R1	Oran Park	(Australia) Craig Lowndes	(Australia) Mark Skaife	(Australia) Mark Skaife (Holden Racing Team, Holden)	report
8	R2	Oran Park		(Australia) Mark Skaife	(Australia) Mark Skaife (Holden Racing Team, Holden)	report
9		Ipswich	(Australia) Marcos Ambrose	(New Zealand) Paul Radisich (Australia) Steven Johnson (Dick Johnson Racing, Ford)		report
10	R1	Winton	(Australia) Russell Ingall	(New Zealand) Greg Murphy	(Australia) Russell Ingall (Perkins Engineering, Holden)	report
10	R2	Winton		(Australia) Russell Ingall	(Australia) Russell Ingall (Perkins Engineering, Holden)	report
11		Bathurst	(Australia) Marcos Ambrose	(Australia) Mark Skaife (Australia) Tony Longhurst (Holden Racing Team, Holden)		report
12	R1	Pukekohe	(New Zealand) Greg Murphy	(New Zealand) Greg Murphy	(New Zealand) Greg Murphy (Tom Walkinshaw Racing Australia, Holden)	report
12	R2	Pukekohe		(New Zealand) Greg Murphy	(New Zealand) Greg Murphy (Tom Walkinshaw Racing Australia, Holden)	report
12	R3	Pukekohe		(New Zealand) Greg Murphy	(New Zealand) Greg Murphy (Tom Walkinshaw Racing Australia, Holden)	report
13	R1	Sandown	(Australia) Mark Skaife	(Australia) Mark Skaife	Todd Kelly (Tom Walkinshaw Racing Australia, Holden)	report
13	R2	Sandown		(Australia) Todd Kelly	Todd Kelly (Tom Walkinshaw Racing Australia, Holden)	report
13	R3	Sandown		(Australia) Craig Lowndes	Todd Kelly (Tom Walkinshaw Racing Australia, Holden)	report

=== Points system ===
Championship points were awarded on the following basis:

Points format	Position																															
Points format	1st	2nd	3rd	4th	5th	6th	7th	8th	9th	10th	11th	12th	13th	14th	15th	16th	17th	18th	19th	20th	21st	22nd	23rd	24th	25th	26th	27th	28th	29th	30th	31st	32nd
Qualifying	18	16	14	13	12	11	10	9	8	7																						
Point system 1	90	80	72	66	62	58	54	50	48	46	44	42	40	38	36	34	32	30	28	26	24	22	20	18	16	14	12	10	8	6	4	2
Point system 2	135	120	108	99	93	87	81	75	72	69	66	63	60	57	54	51	48	45	42	39	36	33	30	27	24	21	18	15	12	9	6	3
Point system 3	180	160	144	132	124	116	108	100	96	92	88	84	80	76	72	68	64	60	56	52	48	44	40	36	32	28	24	20	16	12	8	4
Point system 4	360	320	288	264	248	232	216	200	192	184	176	168	160	152	144	136	128	120	112	104	96	88	80	72	64	56	48	40	32	24	16	8
Point system 5	540	480	432	396	372	348	324	300	288	276	264	252	240	228	216	204	192	180	168	156	144	132	120	108	96	84	72	60	48	36	24	12

Qualifying points were issued for the first race of each weekend only. Drivers did not need to finish races to score points, provided they took the start.

- Point system 1: Used for Hidden Valley, Canberra races 1 and 2, Barbagallo, Calder Park, Pukekohe and Sandown.
- Point system 2: Used for Phillip Island, Eastern Creek, Oran Park and Winton.
- Point system 3: Used for Adelaide race 1 and Canberra race 3.
- Point system 4: Used for Adelaide race 2 and the Queensland 500.
- Point system 5: Used for the Bathurst 1000.

=== Drivers championship ===
Pos	Driver	Penalty	PHI	ADE	ECK	DAR	CAN	PER	CAL	OPK	IPS	WIN	BAT	PUK	SAN	Pts
1	(Australia) Mark Skaife	30	288	340	262	218	282	252	108	286	264	228	552	240	188	3478
2	(Australia) Russell Ingall		156	464	93	176	190	189	228	179	333	273	314	125	155	2875
3	(Australia) Jason Bright	80	235	468	237	222	214	157	200	199	264	205	133	181	184	2819
4	(New Zealand) Greg Murphy		201	210	213	211	77	209	127	75	288	231	432	288	162	2724
5	(Australia) Steven Johnson		153	455	108	72	294	176	230	204	370	161	59	164	92	2532
6	(Australia) Todd Kelly		163	334	136	106	119	174	47	187	288	90	432	155	248	2479
7	(New Zealand) Paul Radisich		133	65	201	58	232	288	208	120	370	161	59	110	104	2109
8	(Australia) Marcos Ambrose		200	243	165	232	146	82	194	66	82	201	30	232	213	2086
9	(Australia) Steven Ellery		132	220	54	118	187	104	156	126	232	148	333	126	137	2073
10	(Australia) Garth Tander		104	238	108	84	288	108	150	146	144	109	356	142	70	2047
11	(Australia) Craig Lowndes		238	213	172	32	180	188	123	219	16	51	192	125	242	1991
12	(New Zealand) Steven Richards		191	284	77	172	205	134	148	105	33	105	304	50	104	1912
13	(Australia) Tony Longhurst		57	256	108	62	36	102	80	102	262	29	552	168	80	1894
14	(Australia) Larry Perkins		93	264	72	156	134	49	86	54	333	66	314	132	103	1856
15	(Australia) Jason Bargwanna		105	248	62	134	136	88	64	90	144	126	356	124	144	1821
16	(Australia) Glenn Seton		150	304	142	132	172	94	78	120	33	75	304	94	102	1800
17	(Australia) Paul Morris		66	76	141	72	166	68	274	99	195	184	252	22	86	1701
18	(Australia) Brad Jones		81	84	144	104	94	64	70	123	40	54	480	72	132	1542
19	(Australia) Mark Larkham		54	160	69	165	178	50	127	51	143	87	84	96	62	1326
20	(Australia) Paul Weel		78	32	105	102	112	102	76	81	216	93	132	100	78	1307
21	(Australia) Cameron McConville		54	Ret	75	96	122	134	134	163	112	21	276	48	40	1275
22	(Australia) John Bowe		54	108	209	59	232	120	76	84	108	102	118			1270
23	(Australia) David Besnard		57	4	45	177	64	58	102	242	96	84	60	52	112	1153
24	(New Zealand) Jason Richards		DNQ	136	DNQ	68	110	64	42	75	160	69	204	108	110	1146
25	(Australia) Cameron McLean		108	Ret	144	132	20	114	52	57	Ret	105	396			1128
26	(Australia) Anthony Tratt		9	180	60	44	96	52	50	DNPQ	128	114	216	72	44	1065
27	(Australia) Paul Romano		30	104	27	68	100	30	36		192	72	240	60	10	969
28	(Australia) Tomas Mezera		48	176	DNQ				50	57	262		133	94	78	898
29	(Australia) Rodney Forbes		66	Ret	DNS	68	142	70	78	69	Ret	30	144	116	70	853
30	(New Zealand) John Faulkner		51	252	42	34	52	48	DNQ	48	56	63	Ret	70	94	810
31	(Australia) Dugal McDougall		54	88	108	42	22		32	DNPQ	176	57	156		46	781
32	(Australia) Dean Canto		DNQ	92	42	DNQ			30	DNPQ	200		379			743
33	(Australia) Trevor Ashby		51	208	33			74					264			630
34	(Australia) Greg Ritter		DNQ	128							72		396			596
35	(New Zealand) Jim Richards										200		379			579
36	(Australia) Geoff Brabham										232		333			565
37	(United Kingdom) John Cleland										40		480			520
38	(New Zealand) Angus Fogg			52							160		204	48		464
39	(Australia) Owen Kelly										192		240			432
40	(Australia) Steve Reed					50	116						264			430
41	(New Zealand) Simon Wills										108		118	76	114	416
42	(Australia) Rick Bates										112		276			388
43	(Australia) Tim Leahey										216		132			348
44	(Australia) Alan Jones										128		216			344
45	(Australia) Tyler Mecklem		DNQ	180	12	32	112		DNQ							336
46	(Australia) Andrew Miedecke										176		156			332
47	(Australia) Rick Kelly										Ret		228		80	308
48	(Australia) Matthew White		51	24		DNQ			38		96		60		16	285
49	(New Zealand) Ashley Stichbury												252			252
50	(Australia) Alan Heath			56									180			236
51	(Australia) Dale Brede										48		180			228
51	(Australia) Nathan Pretty												228			228
53	(Australia) Wayne Gardner										143		84			227
54	(Australia) Neil Crompton										16		192			208
55	(Australia) Phillip Scifleet										32		168			200
56	(United Kingdom) Matt Neal									DNS	195					195
57	(Australia) Tony Ricciardello							24			120		32			180
58	(Australia) James Brock										104	66	Ret			170
59	(Australia) Christian D'Agostin					DNQ							168			168
59	(Australia) Paul Dumbrell										168		Ret			168
59	(Australia) Leanne Ferrier										168		Ret			168
62	(Australia) Michael Donaher									15	152		Ret			167
63	(Australia) Adam Macrow										88		72			160
63	(Australia) Luke Youlden										88		72			160
65	(Australia) Rod Nash										120		36			156
66	(Australia) Layton Crambrook										152		Ret		DNQ	152
67	(Australia) Craig Harris										48		96			144
67	(Australia) David Parsons										Ret		144			144
69	(Australia) Ross Halliday			116									Ret			116
70	(Australia) Steve Owen										104		Ret			104
71	(Australia) Michael Simpson												96			96
72	(Australia) Gary Holt			48						45			Ret			93
73	(Australia) Greg Crick										82		Ret			82
74	(Australia) Paul Stokell										72					72
75	(Australia) Eddie Abelnica											57				57
76	(New Zealand) Craig Baird										56		Ret			56
77	(Australia) Peter Doulman				48					DNPQ			Ret			48
78	(Australia) Daniel Miller							42								42
79	(Australia) Rod Salmon										16		24			40
79	(Australia) Terry Wyhoon										16		24			40
81	(Australia) Aaron McGill										32					32
82	(Australia) Wayne Wakefield												30			30
Pos	Driver	Penalty	PHI	ADE	ECK	DAR	CAN	PER	CAL	OPK	IPS	WIN	BAT	PUK	SAN	Pts

Colour	Result
Gold	Winner
Silver	Second place
Bronze	Third place
Green	Points classification
Blue	Non-points classification
Blue	Non-classified finish (NC)
Purple	Retired, not classified (Ret)
Red	Did not qualify (DNQ)
Red	Did not pre-qualify (DNPQ)
Black	Disqualified (DSQ)
White	Did not start (DNS)
White	Withdrew (WD)
White	Race cancelled (C)
Blank	Did not practice (DNP)
Blank	Did not arrive (DNA)
Blank	Excluded (EX)
