= 2001 Queensland 500 =

2001 Supercar Championship event

2001 VIP Petfoods Queensland 500
Event Information
- Round 9 of 13 in the 2001 Shell Championship Series
- Date: 24–26 August 2001
- Location: Ipswich, Queensland
- Venue: Queensland Raceway
- Weather: Fine, thunderstorms at end of race

Results
Race 1
Distance	156 laps	487 km
Pole position	Marcos Ambrose; Stone Brothers Racing	1:10.5362
Winner	Paul Radisich; Steven Johnson; Dick Johnson Racing	3:17:41.1244
Round Results
First	Paul Radisich Steven Johnson; Dick Johnson Racing	370 pts
Second	Russell Ingall Larry Perkins; Perkins Engineering	333 pts
Third	Greg Murphy Todd Kelly; Kmart Racing Team	288 pts

The 2001 VIP Petfoods Queensland 500 was an endurance race for V8 Supercars held at Queensland Raceway near Ipswich in Queensland, Australia on 26 August 2001. The programmed race distance was 161 laps (approx 500 km) however the race was stopped due to heavy rain and results were declared as at the completion of 156 laps.

The event was Round 9 of the 2001 Shell Championship Series and it was the third Queensland 500 V8 Supercar race.

The race was won by Steven Johnson and Paul Radisich driving a Ford Falcon (AU) for Dick Johnson Racing.

== Race results ==
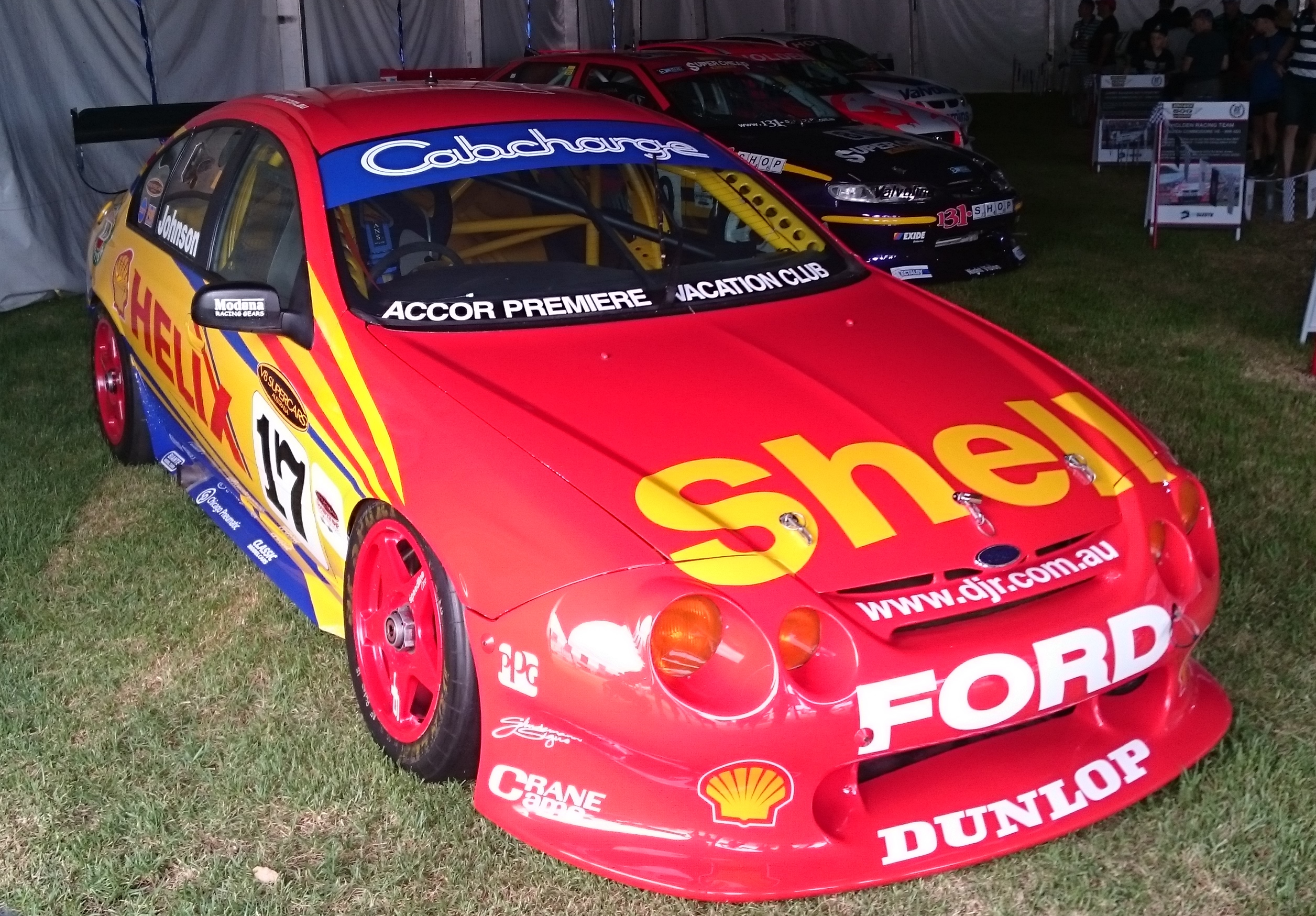
The Ford Falcon AU with which Steven Johnson and Paul Radisich won the 2001 Queensland 500. The car is pictured in 2018

=== Qualifying ===
Pos	No	Drivers	Team	Car	Time
1	11	(Australia) Russell Ingall (Australia) Larry Perkins	Perkins Engineering	Holden Commodore (VX)	1:09.9367
2	1	(Australia) Mark Skaife (Australia) Jason Bright	Holden Racing Team	Holden Commodore (VX)	1:10.0139
3	4	(Australia) Marcos Ambrose (Australia) Greg Crick	Stone Brothers Racing	Ford Falcon (AU)	1:10.2538
4	17	(Australia) Steven Johnson (New Zealand) Paul Radisich	Dick Johnson Racing	Ford Falcon (AU)	1:10.4332
5	600	(Australia) John Bowe (New Zealand) Simon Wills	Briggs Motor Sport	Ford Falcon (AU)	1:10.5429
6	15	(New Zealand) Greg Murphy (Australia) Todd Kelly	Kmart Racing Team	Holden Commodore (VX)	1:10.6057
7	2	(Australia) Tony Longhurst (Australia) Tomas Mezera	Holden Racing Team	Holden Commodore (VX)	1:10.6065
8	29	(Australia) Paul Morris (United Kingdom) Matt Neal	Paul Morris Motorsport	Holden Commodore (VT)	1:10.6388
9	9	(Australia) David Besnard (Australia) Matthew White	Stone Brothers Racing	Ford Falcon (AU)	1:10.6444
10	5	(Australia) Glenn Seton (New Zealand) Steven Richards	Glenn Seton Racing	Ford Falcon (AU)	1:10.6619
11	18	(Australia) Greg Ritter (Australia) Paul Stokell	Dick Johnson Racing	Ford Falcon (AU)	1:10.7334
12	10	(Australia) Mark Larkham (Australia) Wayne Gardner	Larkham Motor Sport	Ford Falcon (AU)	1:10.7705
13	43	(Australia) Paul Weel (Australia) Tim Leahey	Paul Weel Racing	Ford Falcon (AU)	1:10.8219
14	00	(Australia) Craig Lowndes (Australia) Neil Crompton	Gibson Motorsport	Ford Falcon (AU)	1:10.8585
15	34	(Australia) Garth Tander (Australia) Jason Bargwanna	Garry Rogers Motorsport	Holden Commodore (VX)	1:10.9445
16	51	(Australia) Nathan Pretty (Australia) Rick Kelly	Kmart Racing Team	Holden Commodore (VX)	1:10.9496
17	31	(Australia) Steven Ellery (Australia) Geoff Brabham	Steven Ellery Racing	Ford Falcon (AU)	1:10.9843
18	3	(Australia) Cameron McConville (Australia) Rick Bates	Lansvale Racing Team	Holden Commodore (VX)	1:11.1493
19	7	(Australia) Rodney Forbes (Australia) David Parsons	Gibson Motorsport	Ford Falcon (AU)	1:11.2054
20	21	(Australia) Brad Jones (United Kingdom) John Cleland	Brad Jones Racing	Ford Falcon (AU)	1:11.2108
21	6	(New Zealand) Jim Richards (Australia) Dean Canto	Glenn Seton Racing	Ford Falcon (AU)	1:11.2589
22	8	(Australia) Luke Youlden (Australia) Adam Macrow	Perkins Engineering	Holden Commodore (VX)	1:11.4792
23	021	(New Zealand) Jason Richards (New Zealand) Angus Fogg	Team Kiwi Racing	Holden Commodore (VX)	1:11.6067
24	46	(New Zealand) John Faulkner (New Zealand) Craig Baird	John Faulkner Racing	Holden Commodore (VX)	1:11.6108
25	35	(Australia) Leanne Ferrier (Australia) Paul Dumbrell	Garry Rogers Motorsport	Holden Commodore (VT)	1:11.6218
26	88	(Australia) Craig Harris (Australia) Dale Brede	Harris Racing	Ford Falcon (AU)	1:11.6273
27	16	(Australia) Dugal McDougall (Australia) Andrew Miedecke	McDougall Motorsport	Holden Commodore (VX)	1:11.6286
28	24	(Australia) Paul Romano (Australia) Owen Kelly	Romano Racing	Holden Commodore (VX)	1:11.6706
29	14	(Australia) James Brock (Australia) Steve Owen	Imrie Motorsport	Holden Commodore (VX)	1:11.8834
30	50	(Australia) Michael Donaher (Australia) Layton Crambrook	Clive Wiseman Racing	Holden Commodore (VT)	1:12.2578
31	54	(Australia) Rod Nash (Australia) Tony Ricciardello	Rod Nash Racing	Holden Commodore (VT)	1:12.7062
32	75	(Australia) Anthony Tratt (Australia) Alan Jones	Paul Little Racing	Ford Falcon (AU)	1:12.9360
33	25	(Australia) Terry Wyhoon (Australia) Rod Salmon	Terry Wyhoon Racing	Ford Falcon (AU)	1:13.4461
34	45	(Australia) Phillip Scifleet (Australia) Aaron McGill	RPM International Racing	Ford Falcon (AU)	1:15.3241

=== Top-Fifteen Shootout ===
The Top Fifteen Shootout was contested by the top fifteen cars from qualifying to determine grid positions 1 through 15 for the race.

Pos.	No.	Driver	Team	Car	Time
1	4	(Australia) Marcos Ambrose	Stone Brothers Racing	Ford Falcon (AU)	1:10.5362
2	9	(Australia) David Besnard	Stone Brothers Racing	Ford Falcon (AU)	1:10.6509
3	2	(Australia) Tony Longhurst	Holden Racing Team	Holden Commodore (VX)	1:10.6695
4	11	(Australia) Russell Ingall	Perkins Engineering	Holden Commodore (VX)	1:10.6800
5	600	(Australia) John Bowe	Briggs Motor Sport	Ford Falcon (AU)	1:10.7107
6	29	(Australia) Paul Morris	Paul Morris Motorsport	Holden Commodore (VT)	1:10.7268
7	17	(New Zealand) Paul Radisich	Dick Johnson Racing	Ford Falcon (AU)	1:10.8704
8	5	(Australia) Glenn Seton	Glenn Seton Racing	Ford Falcon (AU)	1:11.0228
9	00	(Australia) Craig Lowndes	Gibson Motorsport	Ford Falcon (AU)	1:11.1804
10	10	(Australia) Mark Larkham	Larkham Motor Sport	Ford Falcon (AU)	1:11.2529
11	15	(Australia) Todd Kelly	Kmart Racing Team	Holden Commodore (VX)	1:11.2617
12	18	(Australia) Greg Ritter	Dick Johnson Racing	Ford Falcon (AU)	1:11.2787
13	43	(Australia) Paul Weel	Paul Weel Racing	Ford Falcon (AU)	1:11.3674
14	34	(Australia) Garth Tander	Garry Rogers Motorsport	Holden Commodore (VX)	1:11.8497
15	1	(Australia) Mark Skaife	Holden Racing Team	Holden Commodore (VX)	1:25.0870

=== Race ===
Pos	No	Drivers	Team	Car	Laps	Time	Grid
1	17	(Australia) Steven Johnson (New Zealand) Paul Radisich	Dick Johnson Racing	Ford Falcon (AU)	156	3hr 17min 41.1244sec	7
2	11	(Australia) Russell Ingall (Australia) Larry Perkins	Perkins Engineering	Holden Commodore (VX)	156	+ 0.94 s	4
3	15	(New Zealand) Greg Murphy (Australia) Todd Kelly	Kmart Racing Team	Holden Commodore (VX)	156	+ 23.29 s	11
4	1	(Australia) Mark Skaife (Australia) Jason Bright	Holden Racing Team	Holden Commodore (VX)	156	+ 48.13 s	15
5	2	(Australia) Tony Longhurst (Australia) Tomas Mezera	Holden Racing Team	Holden Commodore (VX)	156	+ 1:20.34 s	3
6	31	(Australia) Steven Ellery (Australia) Geoff Brabham	Steven Ellery Racing	Ford Falcon (AU)	155	+ 1 Lap	17
7	43	(Australia) Paul Weel (Australia) Tim Leahey	Paul Weel Racing	Ford Falcon (AU)	155	+ 1 Lap	13
8	6	(New Zealand) Jim Richards (Australia) Dean Canto	Glenn Seton Racing	Ford Falcon (AU)	154	+ 2 Laps	21
9	24	(Australia) Paul Romano (Australia) Owen Kelly	Romano Racing	Holden Commodore (VX)	153	+ 3 Laps	28
10	29	(Australia) Paul Morris (United Kingdom) Matt Neal	Paul Morris Motorsport	Holden Commodore (VT)	153	+ 3 Laps	6
11	16	(Australia) Dugal McDougall (Australia) Andrew Miedecke	McDougall Motorsport	Holden Commodore (VX)	153	+ 3 Laps	27
12	35	(Australia) Leanne Ferrier (Australia) Paul Dumbrell	Garry Rogers Motorsport	Holden Commodore (VT)	153	+ 3 Laps	25
13	021	(New Zealand) Jason Richards (New Zealand) Angus Fogg	Team Kiwi Racing	Holden Commodore (VX)	152	+ 4 Laps	23
14	50	(Australia) Michael Donaher (Australia) Layton Crambrook	Clive Wiseman Racing	Holden Commodore (VT)	151	+ 5 Laps	30
15	34	(Australia) Garth Tander (Australia) Jason Bargwanna	Garry Rogers Motorsport	Holden Commodore (VX)	147	+ 9 Laps	14
16	10	(Australia) Mark Larkham (Australia) Wayne Gardner	Larkham Motor Sport	Ford Falcon (AU)	142	+ 14 Laps	10
17	75	(Australia) Anthony Tratt (Australia) Alan Jones	Paul Little Racing	Ford Falcon (AU)	138	+ 18 Laps	32
18	54	(Australia) Rod Nash (Australia) Tony Ricciardello	Rod Nash Racing	Holden Commodore (VX)	133	+ 23 Laps	31
19	3	(Australia) Cameron McConville (Australia) Rick Bates	Lansvale Racing Team	Holden Commodore (VX)	130	+ 26 Laps	18
20	14	(Australia) James Brock (Australia) Steve Owen	Imrie Motorsport	Holden Commodore (VX)	125	+ 31 Laps	29
Ret	600	(Australia) John Bowe (New Zealand) Simon Wills	Briggs Motor Sport	Ford Falcon (AU)	155	Spun off	5
Ret	8	(Australia) Adam Macrow (Australia) Luke Youlden	Perkins Engineering	Holden Commodore (VX)	146	Spun off	22
Ret	9	(Australia) David Besnard (Australia) Matthew White	Stone Brothers Racing	Ford Falcon (AU)	135	Puncture	2
Ret	18	(Australia) Greg Ritter (Australia) Paul Stokell	Dick Johnson Racing	Ford Falcon (AU)	122	Engine	12
Ret	4	(Australia) Marcos Ambrose (Australia) Greg Crick	Stone Brothers Racing	Ford Falcon (AU)	122	Spun Off	1
Ret	46	(New Zealand) John Faulkner (New Zealand) Craig Baird	John Faulkner Racing	Holden Commodore (VT)	106	Retired	24
Ret	88	(Australia) Craig Harris (Australia) Dale Brede	Harris Racing	Ford Falcon (AU)	101	Retired	26
Ret	21	(Australia) Brad Jones (United Kingdom) John Cleland	Brad Jones Racing	Ford Falcon (AU)	94	Electrical	20
Ret	45	(Australia) Phillip Scifleet (Australia) Aaron McGill	RPM International Racing	Ford Falcon (AU)	65	Engine	34
Ret	5	(Australia) Glenn Seton (New Zealand) Steven Richards	Glenn Seton Racing	Ford Falcon (AU)	40	Engine	8
Ret	25	(Australia) Terry Wyhoon (Australia) Rod Salmon	Terry Wyhoon Racing	Ford Falcon (AU)	24	Engine	33
Ret	00	(Australia) Craig Lowndes (Australia) Neil Crompton	Gibson Motorsport	Ford Falcon (AU)	15	Blown Tyre	9
Ret	7	(Australia) Rodney Forbes (Australia) David Parsons	Gibson Motorsport	Ford Falcon (AU)	5	Fire	19
Ret	51	(Australia) Nathan Pretty (Australia) Rick Kelly	Kmart Racing Team	Holden Commodore (VX)	0	Driveshaft	16
Fastest Lap: Jason Bright (Holden Racing Team) - 1:11.5990 on lap 128

== Championship points ==
Round points tally

Pos.	No	Driver	Team	Pts
1	17	(Australia) Steven Johnson (New Zealand) Paul Radisich	Dick Johnson Racing	370
2	11	(Australia) Russell Ingall (Australia) Larry Perkins	Perkins Engineering	333
3	15	(Australia) Todd Kelly (New Zealand) Greg Murphy	Tom Walkinshaw Racing Australia	288
4	1	(Australia) Mark Skaife (Australia) Jason Bright	Holden Racing Team	264
5	2	(Australia) Tony Longhurst (Australia) Tomas Mezera	Holden Racing Team	262

Drivers' Championship standings after Round 9

Pos.	No	Driver	Team	Pts
1	1	(Australia) Mark Skaife	Holden Racing Team	2270
2	2	(Australia) Jason Bright	Holden Racing Team	2166
3	17	(Australia) Steven Johnson	Dick Johnson Racing	2062
4	8	(Australia) Russell Ingall	Perkins Engineering	2008
5	18	(New Zealand) Paul Radisich	Dick Johnson Racing	1675
