= Wheel (disambiguation) =

A wheel is a circular device that is capable of rotating on an axle.

Wheel or The Wheel may also refer to:

== Machinery ==
- Ferris wheel
- Breaking wheel, a medieval execution device
- English wheel, a metalworking tool used to curve sheet metal
- Hamster wheel, an exercise toy used by pet rodents
- Water wheel, a wheel for converting the energy of flowing or falling water
- Steering wheel, for steering land vehicles
- Ship's wheel, for steering water vessels
- Potter's wheel, for shaping ceramics
- Rim (wheel), the periphery or outside edge of a wheel
- Bicycle
- Alloy wheel, a type of automobile wheel
- Artillery wheel, a type of wheel most recently used on American cars
- Steel wheel
- Train wheel
- Wagon wheel
- Wheel and axle, a simple machine that translates torque or force applied at one radius to a different force or torque at a different radius
- Wire wheel

== Science and technology ==
- Wheel (algebra), an algebra in which division by zero is possible
- Wheel (computing), in computing, a user group that provides additional special system privileges
- Prayer wheel (slide rule), a circular slide rule
- Wheel graph, a mathematical concept

== Geography ==
- Wheel, Kentucky, U.S.
- Wheel, Tennessee, U.S.

== Religion ==
- Wheel of Law or Wheel of Dharma, a symbol that has represented dharma, the Buddha's teaching of the path to enlightenment
- In the Judeo-Christian tradition, the following classes of celestial beings:
  - Throne (angel)
  - Ophanim
- Prayer wheel, a cylindrical wheel on a spindle

== Film and television ==
- La Roue (The Wheel), a 1923 French film
- The Wheel (1925 film)
- The Wheel (game show), a British television game show created and hosted by Michael McIntyre
- The Wheel (American game show)
- "The Wheel", a wheel in the game show Wheel of Fortune
- "The Wheel" (Law & Order), a 2002 episode of Law & Order
- "The Wheel" (Mad Men), an episode of Mad Men
- The Wheel, a 1983 production by the Theatre New Brunswick
- Das Rad (The Wheel), a 2001 animated short
- The Wheel (2021 film)
- Wheel of Fortune (American game show), often referred to as simply Wheel

== Music ==
- "The Wheel", the nickname of guitarist Radomir Mihailović
- Wheel (album), a 2013 album by Laura Stevenson
- The Wheel (band), Australian country music band.
- The Wheel (Asleep at the Wheel album), a 1977 album by Asleep at the Wheel
- The Wheel (Rosanne Cash album), a 1993 album by Rosanne Cash
- The Wheel, 2003 album by David Olney

=== Songs ===
- "The Wheel" (song), a song by PJ Harvey, 2016
- "The Wheel", a song by Bill Black's Combo, 1960
- "The Wheel", a song by Bert Jansch from Lucky Thirteen (Bert Jansch album), 1966
- "The Wheel", a song and single by Jerry Garcia, Robert Hunter, and Bill Kreutzmann from the 1972 album Garcia
- "The Wheel", a song and single by Spear Of Destiny from Grapes of Wrath, 1983
- "The Wheel", a song by Edie Brickell & New Bohemians from Shooting Rubberbands at the Stars, 1988
- "The Wheel", a song by Rosanne Cash from album of the same name, 1993
- "The Wheel", a song by King Gizzard & the Lizard Wizard from Gumboot Soup, 2017

== People with the surname ==
- Geoff Wheel (1951–2024), Welsh rugby union player
- Lesley Wheel (1929–2004), American architectural lighting designer

== Other uses ==
- Agricultural Wheel, an alliance of farmers in Arkansas
- The Wheel, a short story by John Wyndham, published in the collection Jizzle
- An ace-to-five straight, a type of poker hand
- The Wheel (charity), a charity support association in Ireland
- Wheel (detergent), a brand of laundry detergent
- Wheel (route), a pattern run by a receiver or running back in American football
- The Squeaky Wheel, a nickname for a clandestine Russian radio station, also known as S32

== See also ==
- Big wheel (disambiguation)
- Wheels (disambiguation)
- Wheeling (disambiguation)
- Wheelhouse (disambiguation)
- Wheal (disambiguation)
- WEEL (disambiguation)
