= 2001 V8 Supercars Winton round =

2001 Supercar Championship event

(Victoria (state)) 2001 Winton V8 Supercar round
Event Information
- Round 10 of 13 in the 2001 Shell Championship Series
- Date: 7–9 September 2001
- Location: Benalla, Victoria
- Venue: Winton Motor Raceway
- Weather: Mixed

Results
Race 1
| Distance | 28 laps | 85 km |
| Pole position | Russell Ingall; Perkins Engineering | 1:24.3328 |
| Winner | Greg Murphy; Tom Walkinshaw Racing Australia | 45:02.1401 |
Race 2
| Distance | 32 laps | 100 km |
| Winner | Russell Ingall; Perkins Engineering | 48:54.0840 |
Round Results
| First | Russell Ingall; Perkins Engineering | 273 pts |
| Second | Greg Murphy; Tom Walkinshaw Racing Australia | 231 pts |
| Third | Mark Skaife; Holden Racing Team | 228 pts |

The 2001 Winton V8 Supercar round was the tenth round of the 2001 Shell Championship Series. It was the 15th ATCC/V8 Supercar event to be held at Winton Motor Raceway and was held on the weekend of 8 to 9 September at the Winton Motor Raceway in Benalla, Victoria.

The first race was won by Greg Murphy after tumultuous proceedings saw the 100 km race red flagged at the 85 km mark. Russell Ingall secured his second race win of the year and cemented round honours to boot. The success of this weekend helped bolster Ingall's standing in the championship and quickly became a prime candidate to challenge championship leader Mark Skaife for the title.

== Background ==
The event was held on the weekend of 8 to 9 September 2001. It was the 15th ATCC/V8 Supercar event to be held at Winton Motor Raceway, and consisted of two 100 km races with compulsory pitstops in both instances.

Mark Skaife entered the round at the championship leader by 104 points over teammate and nearest competitor, Jason Bright.

=== Entry list ===
There was a grid capacity of 32 drivers entered for this round with no pre-qualifying required to filter entrants.

From the last sprint race weekend in Oran Park, new entrants for this round included Eddie Abelnica in the Melbournes Cheapest Cars VT Commodore, and James Brock replacing Tomas Mezera at Imrie Motorsport. Cameron McLean would return with Paragon Motorsport for this round. It would also turn out to be McLean's last solo appearance of the year.

== Race results ==
=== Qualifying ===
Qualifying was disrupted by the intervention of a hailstorm. Multiple cars spun off the road as they struggle to find traction. Garth Tander broke through to take his first provisional pole position of the year with Cameron McLean proving a surprise package, setting a laptime only two hundredths of a second slower than Tander to take second place.

Skaife was a notable absentee from the top ten after a strategic error left him to start from 15th for race one.

| Pos | No | Name | Team | Vehicle | Time |
|---|---|---|---|---|---|
| 1 | 34 | (Australia) Garth Tander | Garry Rogers Motorsport | Holden Commodore (VX) | 1:26.8443 |
| 2 | 40 | (Australia) Cameron McLean | Paragon Motorsport | Ford Falcon (AU) | 1:26.8614 |
| 3 | 8 | (Australia) Russell Ingall | Perkins Engineering | Holden Commodore (VX) | 1:27.0949 |
| 4 | 29 | (Australia) Paul Morris | Paul Morris Motorsport | Holden Commodore (VT) | 1:27.6587 |
| 5 | 17 | (Australia) Steven Johnson | Dick Johnson Racing | Ford Falcon (AU) | 1:27.9589 |
| 6 | 54 | (Australia) Tony Longhurst | Rod Nash Racing | Holden Commodore (VX) | 1:28.2574 |
| 7 | 18 | (New Zealand) Paul Radisich | Dick Johnson Racing | Ford Falcon (AU) | 1:28.4970 |
| 8 | 31 | (Australia) Steven Ellery | Steven Ellery Racing | Ford Falcon (AU) | 1:28.7429 |
| 9 | 2 | (Australia) Jason Bright | Holden Racing Team | Holden Commodore (VX) | 1:29.8535 |
| 10 | 51 | (New Zealand) Greg Murphy | Tom Walkinshaw Racing Australia | Holden Commodore (VX) | 1:29.9967 |
| 11 | 21 | (Australia) Brad Jones | Brad Jones Racing | Ford Falcon (AU) | 1:30.0137 |
| 12 | 10 | (Australia) Mark Larkham | Larkham Motorsport | Ford Falcon (AU) | 1:30.1214 |
| 13 | 600 | (Australia) John Bowe | Briggs Motorsport | Ford Falcon (AU) | 1:30.3932 |
| 14 | 3 | (Australia) Cameron McConville | Lansvale Racing Team | Holden Commodore (VX) | 1:30.4694 |
| 15 | 1 | (Australia) Mark Skaife | Holden Racing Team | Holden Commodore (VX) | 1:30.7395 |
| 16 | 15 | (Australia) Todd Kelly | Tom Walkinshaw Racing Australia | Holden Commodore (VX) | 1:30.8651 |
| 17 | 16 | (Australia) Dugal McDougall | McDougall Motorsport | Holden Commodore (VX) | 1:31.0697 |
| 18 | 4 | (Australia) Marcos Ambrose | Stone Brothers Racing | Ford Falcon (AU) | 1:31.3546 |
| 19 | 35 | (Australia) Jason Bargwanna | Garry Rogers Motorsport | Holden Commodore (VX) | 1:31.5494 |
| 20 | 43 | (Australia) Paul Weel | Paul Weel Racing | Ford Falcon (AU) | 1:31.6844 |
| 21 | 5 | (Australia) Glenn Seton | Glenn Seton Racing | Ford Falcon (AU) | 1:31.8532 |
| 22 | 11 | (Australia) Larry Perkins | Perkins Engineering | Holden Commodore (VX) | 1:31.9287 |
| 23 | 021 | (New Zealand) Jason Richards | Team Kiwi Racing | Holden Commodore (VT) | 1:32.0458 |
| 24 | 9 | (Australia) David Besnard | Stone Brothers Racing | Ford Falcon (AU) | 1:32.1047 |
| 25 | 6 | (New Zealand) Steven Richards | Glenn Seton Racing | Ford Falcon (AU) | 1:32.1956 |
| 26 | 24 | (Australia) Paul Romano | Romano Racing | Holden Commodore (VX) | 1:32.3247 |
| 27 | 00 | (Australia) Craig Lowndes | Gibson Motorsport | Ford Falcon (AU) | 1:32.4058 |
| 28 | 7 | (Australia) Rodney Forbes | Gibson Motorsport | Ford Falcon (AU) | 1:33.3639 |
| 29 | 46 | (New Zealand) John Faulkner | John Faulkner Racing | Holden Commodore (VT) | 1:33.5859 |
| 30 | 75 | (Australia) Anthony Tratt | Paul Little Racing | Ford Falcon (AU) | 1:33.9583 |
| 31 | 48 | (Australia) Eddie Abelnica | Melbournes Cheapest Cars | Holden Commodore (VT) | 1:34.3870 |
| 32 | 14 | (Australia) James Brock | Imrie Motorsport | Holden Commodore (VX) | 1:35.1691 |

=== Top Ten Shootout ===
Conditions were tricky for the shootout as the track was still majorly damp with the exception of the drying racing line. All competitors went out on dry weather tyres. Russell Ingall took his first V8 Supercar pole position by way of setting a laptime over half a second faster than nearest competitor, Paul Morris. Cameron McLean and Tony Longhurst provided their respective teams - Paragon Motorsport and Rod Nash Racing - with their best qualifying positions in the V8 Supercar championship to date.

| Pos | No | Name | Team | Vehicle | Time |
|---|---|---|---|---|---|
| 1 | 8 | (Australia) Russell Ingall | Perkins Engineering | Holden Commodore (VX) | 1:24.3328 |
| 2 | 29 | (Australia) Paul Morris | Paul Morris Motorsport | Holden Commodore (VT) | 1:24.9150 |
| 3 | 18 | (New Zealand) Paul Radisich | Dick Johnson Racing | Ford Falcon (AU) | 1:24.9154 |
| 4 | 34 | (Australia) Garth Tander | Garry Rogers Motorsport | Holden Commodore (VX) | 1:25.0289 |
| 5 | 40 | (Australia) Cameron McLean | Paragon Motorsport | Ford Falcon (AU) | 1:25.4027 |
| 6 | 54 | (Australia) Tony Longhurst | Rod Nash Racing | Holden Commodore (VX) | 1:25.5214 |
| 7 | 31 | (Australia) Steven Ellery | Steven Ellery Racing | Ford Falcon (AU) | 1:25.6025 |
| 8 | 51 | (New Zealand) Greg Murphy | Tom Walkinshaw Racing Team | Holden Commodore (VX) | 1:26.0698 |
| 9 | 17 | (Australia) Steven Johnson | Dick Johnson Racing | Ford Falcon (AU) | 1:27.1293 |
| 10 | 2 | (Australia) Jason Bright | Holden Racing Team | Holden Commodore (VX) | 1:31.8195 |

=== Race 1 ===
The start was marred by chaos as Tony Longhurst and Steven Ellery collided on the approach to turn one. Out of control, the former made contact with the rear of Cameron McLean, sending the Paragon Motorsport car into a spin, and left multiple drivers, including Jason Bright and Marcos Ambrose, to take to the outfield. Brad Jones and Larry Perkins were also spun off the road at the same point of the circuit. Jones, as well as Glenn Seton, retired from the race owing to damage sustained in the turn one melee.

After the pitstop cycle was complete, Greg Murphy found himself in the lead over Russell Ingall thanks to a rapid pitstop. Craig Lowndes spun off at the sweeper, was unable to restart his engine in the muddy outfield and could not drive out again. A few laps later, his Gibson Motorsport teammate Rodney Forbes encountered the same fate. Paul Weel and Paul Radisich also found themselves trapped in the runoff but were eventually able to get back onto the racetrack. Stone Brothers Racing elected to keep Marcos Ambrose out on circuit and complete his compulsory pitstop at a later time in an alternate strategy. He was finally brought into the pitlane on lap 12.

Despite suffering damage to the exhaust manifold, Ambrose began to rapidly ascend through the pack, setting lap times over a second faster than race leader, Murphy. Mark Skaife had almost made good headway, being placed in third after the pitstop cycle. The safety car was called on lap 20 to retrieve several grief-stricken cars around the circuit. When the race resumed with eight laps remaining, Ambrose immediately passed the lapped car of Paul Romano and set off after the Holden Racing Team duo ahead.

Later on in the lap, Garth Tander made contact with John Bowe, sending the Caterpillar Ford into a spin. Stranded in the path of other cars, a concertina effect saw David Besnard spun off the circuit and Cameron McConville's car launched skyward before breaking its suspension. Todd Kelly also sustained heavy damage to the front end of the car as a consequence of hitting McConville. Two laps later, Tony Longhurst made heavy side-on contact with the turn four wall after being pushed into a spin by Paul Radisich. Steven Richards was spun by Anthony Tratt and James Brock lost a wheel as the race was brought under safety car conditions. The officials would then display the red flag six laps short of the 100 km distance. Murphy would be declared the race winner with Ingall in second and Skaife third.

| Pos | No | Driver | Team | Car | Laps | Time | Grid |
|---|---|---|---|---|---|---|---|
| 1 | 51 | (New Zealand) Greg Murphy | Tom Walkinshaw Racing Team | Holden Commodore (VX) | 28 | 45min 02.1401sec | 8 |
| 2 | 8 | (Australia) Russell Ingall | Perkins Engineering | Holden Commodore (VX) | 28 | + 0.92 | 1 |
| 3 | 1 | (Australia) Mark Skaife | Holden Racing Team | Holden Commodore (VX) | 28 | + 1.75 | 15 |
| 4 | 2 | (Australia) Jason Bright | Holden Racing Team | Holden Commodore (VX) | 28 | + 2.65 | 10 |
| 5 | 4 | (Australia) Marcos Ambrose | Stone Brothers Racing | Ford Falcon (AU) | 28 | + 3.20 | 18 |
| 6 | 29 | (Australia) Paul Morris | Paul Morris Motorsport | Holden Commodore (VT) | 28 | + 3.79 | 2 |
| 7 | 35 | (Australia) Jason Bargwanna | Garry Rogers Motorsport | Holden Commodore (VX) | 28 | + 6.22 | 19 |
| 8 | 17 | (Australia) Steven Johnson | Dick Johnson Racing | Ford Falcon (AU) | 28 | + 8.20 | 9 |
| 9 | 10 | (Australia) Mark Larkham | Larkham Motorsport | Ford Falcon (AU) | 28 | + 9.25 | 12 |
| 10 | 34 | (Australia) Garth Tander | Garry Rogers Motorsport | Holden Commodore (VX) | 28 | + 11.06 | 4 |
| 11 | 15 | (Australia) Todd Kelly | Tom Walkinshaw Racing Team | Holden Commodore (VX) | 28 | + 11.82 | 16 |
| 12 | 31 | (Australia) Steven Ellery | Steven Ellery Racing | Ford Falcon (AU) | 28 | + 13.12 | 7 |
| 13 | 75 | (Australia) Anthony Tratt | Paul Little Racing | Ford Falcon (AU) | 28 | + 13.66 | 30 |
| 14 | 40 | (Australia) Cameron McLean | Paragon Motorsport | Ford Falcon (AU) | 28 | + 14.56 | 5 |
| 15 | 18 | (New Zealand) Paul Radisich | Dick Johnson Racing | Ford Falcon (AU) | 28 | + 15.73 | 3 |
| 16 | 46 | (New Zealand) John Faulkner | John Faulkner Racing | Holden Commodore (VT) | 28 | + 17.74 | 29 |
| 17 | 16 | (Australia) Dugal McDougall | McDougall Motorsport | Holden Commodore (VX) | 28 | + 19.44 | 17 |
| 18 | 14 | (Australia) James Brock | Imrie Motorsport | Holden Commodore (VX) | 28 | + 22.19 | 32 |
| 19 | 600 | (Australia) John Bowe | Briggs Motorsport | Ford Falcon (AU) | 28 | + 23.26 | 13 |
| 20 | 6 | (New Zealand) Steven Richards | Glenn Seton Racing | Ford Falcon (AU) | 28 | + 23.91 | 25 |
| 21 | 11 | (Australia) Larry Perkins | Perkins Engineering | Holden Commodore (VX) | 27 | + 1 lap | 22 |
| 22 | 24 | (Australia) Paul Romano | Romano Racing | Holden Commodore (VX) | 27 | + 1 lap | 26 |
| 23 | 43 | (Australia) Paul Weel | Paul Weel Racing | Ford Falcon (AU) | 27 | + 1 lap | 20 |
| 24 | 9 | (Australia) David Besnard | Stone Brothers Racing | Ford Falcon (AU) | 27 | + 1 lap | 24 |
| 25 | 48 | (Australia) Eddie Abelnica | Melbournes Cheapest Cars | Holden Commodore (VT) | 27 | + 1 lap | 31 |
| 26 | 021 | (New Zealand) Jason Richards | Team Kiwi Racing | Holden Commodore (VT) | 26 | + 2 laps | 23 |
| Ret | 54 | (Australia) Tony Longhurst | Rod Nash Racing | Holden Commodore (VX) | 26 | Accident | 6 |
| Ret | 3 | (Australia) Cameron McConville | Lansvale Racing Team | Holden Commodore (VX) | 24 | Accident | 14 |
| Ret | 7 | (Australia) Rodney Forbes | Gibson Motorsport | Ford Falcon (AU) | 10 | Spun off | 28 |
| Ret | 00 | (Australia) Craig Lowndes | Gibson Motorsport | Ford Falcon (AU) | 4 | Spun off | 27 |
| Ret | 5 | (Australia) Glenn Seton | Glenn Seton Racing | Ford Falcon (AU) | 1 | Steering arm | 21 |
| Ret | 21 | (Australia) Brad Jones | Brad Jones Racing | Ford Falcon (AU) | 0 | Collision damage | 11 |
Fastest Lap: Paul Radisich (Dick Johnson Racing) - 1:24.3335 on lap 6

=== Race 2 ===
Steven Richards would start the race from the pitlane owing to technical troubles in the warm-up session. Tony Longhurst was declared a non-starter owing to the damage sustained in race one.

Murphy bogged down off the line and allowed Ingall to take the lead on the approach to turn one. In the second part of the esses, John Faulkner made contact with Dugal McDougall, sending him into a spin. In avoiding action, John Bowe threw his Falcon into a spin and fell to the back of the pack. David Besnard and Jason Richards also spun in the process of avoiding Bowe's stranded car. Ingall and Skaife were the first of the front runners to complete their compulsory pitstops. Murphy suffered a slow pitstop that threw him out of the top ten.

The safety car was deployed on lap 12 after Cameron McConville's car flipped upside down at turn four. The race resumed on lap 17 with Cameron McLean leading the race, albeit still required to take his compulsory pitstop. Ambrose overtook Bright for third place while Tander took the opportunity to sneak past for fourth. However, at the next corner, Bright made contact with the rear of Tander's car and spun the Valvoline Commodore. Tander struggled to get his car out of the damp outfield and rejoined the race at the rear of the pack. To compound his problems, he would also be issued a stop-go penalty for a pit speed violation. Bright would not be punished for his role in the incident. Todd Kelly was relegated to the pitlane on lap 25 due to a flat tyre. On the next lap, Mark Larkham retired from the race after being spun by Larry Perkins into the turn four gravel trap. Perkins was issued a stop-go penalty for his troubles. Besnard would also be penalised for spinning Brad Jones.

Skaife and Ambrose began applying pressure to Ingall for the lead. Despite the pace deficit, Ingall managed to hold station to take his second win of the season and claimed round honours to boot. Skaife and Ambrose rounded out the podium.

| Pos | No | Driver | Team | Car | Laps | Time | Grid |
|---|---|---|---|---|---|---|---|
| 1 | 8 | (Australia) Russell Ingall | Perkins Engineering | Holden Commodore (VX) | 32 | 48min 54.0840sec | 2 |
| 2 | 1 | (Australia) Mark Skaife | Holden Racing Team | Holden Commodore (VX) | 32 | + 0.82 | 3 |
| 3 | 4 | (Australia) Marcos Ambrose | Stone Brothers Racing | Ford Falcon (AU) | 32 | + 1.24 | 5 |
| 4 | 2 | (Australia) Jason Bright | Holden Racing Team | Holden Commodore (VX) | 32 | + 3.27 | 4 |
| 5 | 18 | (New Zealand) Paul Radisich | Dick Johnson Racing | Ford Falcon (AU) | 32 | + 8.87 | 15 |
| 6 | 51 | (New Zealand) Greg Murphy | Tom Walkinshaw Racing Australia | Holden Commodore (VX) | 32 | + 12.48 | 1 |
| 7 | 29 | (Australia) Paul Morris | Paul Morris Motorsport | Holden Commodore (VT) | 32 | + 13.23 | 6 |
| 8 | 31 | (Australia) Steven Ellery | Steven Ellery Racing | Ford Falcon (AU) | 32 | + 15.01 | 12 |
| 9 | 17 | (Australia) Steven Johnson | Dick Johnson Racing | Ford Falcon (AU) | 32 | + 15.52 | 8 |
| 10 | 5 | (Australia) Glenn Seton | Glenn Seton Racing | Ford Falcon (AU) | 32 | + 15.70 | 31 |
| 11 | 6 | (New Zealand) Steven Richards | Glenn Seton Racing | Ford Falcon (AU) | 32 | + 16.14 | 20 |
| 12 | 43 | (Australia) Paul Weel | Paul Weel Racing | Ford Falcon (AU) | 32 | + 21.09 | 23 |
| 13 | 600 | (Australia) John Bowe | Briggs Motorsport | Ford Falcon (AU) | 32 | + 22.25 | 19 |
| 14 | 9 | (Australia) David Besnard | Stone Brothers Racing | Ford Falcon (AU) | 32 | + 28.32 | 24 |
| 15 | 75 | (Australia) Anthony Tratt | Paul Little Racing | Ford Falcon (AU) | 32 | + 28.53 | 13 |
| 16 | 21 | (Australia) Brad Jones | Brad Jones Racing | Ford Falcon (AU) | 32 | + 32.63 | 32 |
| 17 | 021 | (New Zealand) Jason Richards | Team Kiwi Racing | Holden Commodore (VT) | 32 | + 36.52 | 26 |
| 18 | 35 | (Australia) Jason Bargwanna | Garry Rogers Motorsport | Holden Commodore (VX) | 32 | + 38.48 | 7 |
| 19 | 00 | (Australia) Craig Lowndes | Gibson Motorsport | Ford Falcon (AU) | 32 | + 43.26 | 30 |
| 20 | 24 | (Australia) Paul Romano | Romano Racing | Holden Commodore (VX) | 32 | + 45.06 | 22 |
| 21 | 40 | (Australia) Cameron McLean | Paragon Motorsport | Ford Falcon (AU) | 32 | + 45.33 | 14 |
| 22 | 48 | (Australia) Eddie Abelnica | Melbournes Cheapest Cars | Holden Commodore (VT) | 32 | + 55.89 | 25 |
| 23 | 11 | (Australia) Larry Perkins | Perkins Engineering | Holden Commodore (VX) | 32 | + 57.48 | 21 |
| 24 | 34 | (Australia) Garth Tander | Garry Rogers Motorsport | Holden Commodore (VX) | 32 | + 58.12 | 10 |
| 25 | 15 | (Australia) Todd Kelly | Tom Walkinshaw Racing Australia | Holden Commodore (VX) | 32 | + 1:13.08 | 11 |
| 26 | 14 | (Australia) James Brock | Imrie Motorsport | Holden Commodore (VX) | 31 | + 1 lap | 18 |
| 27 | 7 | (Australia) Rodney Forbes | Gibson Motorsport | Ford Falcon (AU) | 26 | + 6 laps | 29 |
| Ret | 10 | (Australia) Mark Larkham | Larkham Motorsport | Ford Falcon (AU) | 25 | Spun off | 9 |
| Ret | 46 | (New Zealand) John Faulkner | John Faulkner Racing | Holden Commodore (VT) | 19 | Mechanical | 16 |
| Ret | 16 | (Australia) Dugal McDougall | McDougall Motorsport | Holden Commodore (VX) | 17 | Mechanical | 17 |
| Ret | 3 | (Australia) Cameron McConville | Lansvale Racing Team | Holden Commodore (VX) | 11 | Accident | 28 |
| DNS | 54 | (Australia) Tony Longhurst | Rod Nash Racing | Holden Commodore (VX) | | Did not start | |
Fastest Lap: Marcos Ambrose (Stone Brothers Racing) - 1:23.4863 on lap 11

== Championship points ==
Round points tally

| Pos. | No | Driver | Team | Pts |
|---|---|---|---|---|
| 1 | 8 | (Australia) Russell Ingall | Perkins Engineering | 273 |
| 2 | 51 | (New Zealand) Greg Murphy | Tom Walkinshaw Racing Australia | 231 |
| 3 | 1 | (Australia) Mark Skaife | Holden Racing Team | 228 |
| 4 | 2 | (Australia) Jason Bright | Holden Racing Team | 205 |
| 5 | 4 | (Australia) Marcos Ambrose | Stone Brothers Racing | 201 |

Drivers' Championship standings after Round 10

| Pos. | No | Driver | Team | Pts |
|---|---|---|---|---|
| 1 | 1 | (Australia) Mark Skaife | Holden Racing Team | 2498 |
| 2 | 2 | (Australia) Jason Bright | Holden Racing Team | 2371 |
| 3 | 8 | (Australia) Russell Ingall | Perkins Engineering | 2281 |
| 4 | 17 | (Australia) Steven Johnson | Dick Johnson Racing | 2217 |
| 5 | 51 | (New Zealand) Greg Murphy | Tom Walkinshaw Racing Australia | 1842 |
