= Wheelhouse (surname) =

Wheelhouse is an English-language surname. Notable people with the surname include:

- Alan Wheelhouse (1934–1998), English first-class cricketer
- Ben Wheelhouse (1902–1985), English footballer
- Claudius Galen Wheelhouse (1826–1909), English physician and photographer
- Grant Wheelhouse (20th century), Australian rugby league player
- Jobe Wheelhouse (born 1985), Australian soccer player
- Mary Wheelhouse (1868–1947), British painter, illustrator, toymaker and suffragette
- Paul Wheelhouse (born 1970), Scottish politician
- Samuel Wheelhouse (born 1994), British inventor and engineer
- Sidney Wheelhouse (1888–1916), English footballer
- William St James Wheelhouse (1821–1886), British barrister and politician
