= James Brock =

Australian racing driver

- Nationality: Australian
- Born: 22 May 1976 (age 50) Melbourne, Victoria
- Relatives: Peter Brock (stepfather)

V8 Supercar Championship Series career
- Debut season: 2000–2001
- Former teams: Romano Racing; Terry Wyhoon Racing; Imrie Motorsport
- Starts: 5
- Wins: 0
- Podiums: 0
- Poles: 0
- Best finish: 58th in 2001

Previous series
- 1999, 2001 2001–03, 2005–2006, 2010 2004 2011: Australian Future Touring Championship; V8 Utes Australian Nations Cup Championship; Fujitsu V8 Supercar Series

James Brock (born 22 May 1976) is a racing driver from Australia who formerly competed in the Supercars Championship. He is the stepson of Peter Brock.

== Career results ==
=== Summary ===
Season	Series	Position	Car	Team
1999	Australian Future Touring Championship	N/A	Holden Commodore VS	Team Brock
2000	V8 Supercar Championship Series	NC	Holden Commodore VS	Romano Racing; Terry Wyhoon Racing
2001	Australian Future Touring Championship	**3rd**	Holden Commodore VS; Holden Commodore VT	Diamond Valley Speed Shop
2001	V8 BrUtes	10th	Holden Commodore VT Ute	N/A
2001	V8 Supercar Championship Series	58th	Holden Commodore VX	Imrie Motorsport
2002	V8 BrUtes	7th	Holden Commodore VT Ute	Rod Nash Racing
2003	Australian V8 BrUtes Championship	**3rd**	Holden Commodore VT Ute; Holden Commodore VY Ute	Paul Weel Racing
2004	Lotus Trophy Series	27th	Lotus Elise	N/A
2005	Australian V8 Ute Racing Series	6th	Holden Commodore VZ Ute	Team Brock
2006	Australian V8 Utes Series	7th	Holden Commodore VZ Ute	Brock Race Engineering
2010	Australian V8 Ute Racing Series	42nd	Holden Commodore VE Ute	Brock Race Engineering
2011	Fujitsu V8 Supercar Series	26th	Holden Commodore VE	Greg Murphy Racing
2012	Australian GT Championship	9th	Mercedes-AMG SLS GT3; Mosler MT900 GT3	Erebus Motorsport

=== Complete V8 Supercars results ===
(key) (Races in bold indicate pole position) (Races in italics indicate fastest lap)

Year	Team	Car	1	2	3	4	5	6	7	8	9	10	11	12	13	14	15	16	17	18	19	20	21	22	23	24	25	26	27	28	29	30	31	32	33	Pos	Points
2000	Romano Racing	Holden Commodore (VS)	PHI; R1	PHI; R2	BAR; R3	BAR; R4	BAR; R5	ADE; R6	ADE; R7	EAS; R8	EAS; R9	EAS; R10	HID; R11	HID; R12	HID; R13	CAN; R14	CAN; R15	CAN; R16	QLD; R17	QLD; R18	QLD; R19	WIN; R20	WIN; R21	WIN; R22	ORA; R23	ORA; R24	ORA; R25	CAL; R26	CAL; R27	CAL; R28	QLD; R29; 21	SAN; R30	SAN; R31	SAN; R32		NC	0
2000	Terry Wyhoon Racing	Holden Commodore (VS)																																	BAT; R33; Ret	NC	0
2001	Imrie Motorsport	Holden Commodore (VX)	PHI; R1	PHI; R2	ADE; R3	ADE; R4	EAS; R5	EAS; R6	HDV; R7	HDV; R8	HDV; R9	CAN; R10	CAN; R11	CAN; R12	BAR; R13	BAR; R14	BAR; R15	CAL; R16	CAL; R17	CAL; R18	ORA; R19	ORA; R20	QLD; R21; 20	WIN; R22; 18	WIN; R23; 26	BAT; R24; Ret	PUK; R25	PUK; R26	PUK; R27	SAN; R28	SAN; R29	SAN; R30				58th	170

=== Complete Bathurst 1000 results ===
Year	Team	Car	Co-driver	Position	Laps
2000	Terry Wyhoon Racing	Holden Commodore VS	(Australia) Terry Wyhoon	DNF	72
2001	Imrie Motorsport	Holden Commodore VX	(Australia) Steve Owen	DNF	12

=== Bathurst 24 Hour results ===
Year	Team	Co-drivers	Car	Class	Laps	Overall position	Class position
2003	(Australia) Ross Palmer Motorsport	(Australia) Mark Brame (Australia) Charlie Kovacs (Australia) Anton Mechtler	Honda S2000	E	411	DNF	DNF
