= Wheelhouse =

Wheelhouse or Wheel-house may refer to:

== Architecture ==
- Wheelhouse (archaeology), a prehistoric structure from the Iron Age found in Scotland
- A building or portion of a building that contains a water wheel
  - Radstube, a building or underground chamber in a mine housing a water wheel

== Transport on water ==
- Bridge (nautical), also known as a pilothouse, the location of the ship's wheel of a boat or ship
- The covering or housing of a paddle wheel in a paddle steamer also known as the paddle-box

== Transport on land ==
- Wheelhouse or wheel well, the part of a vehicle body surrounding one of the wheels, typically a fender or a smaller part attached to the inner surface of the fender
- A turntable (rail)-like device which allows wagons to switch tracks
- Doolittle Maintenance and Storage Facility, used for Bay Area Rapid Transit's Beige Line which goes by the nickname of "the Wheelhouse"
- A term for a Carriage or a Caravan, used for long-distance travel, providing a place to eat and sleep during travel.

== Sport ==
- In baseball jargon: The sweet spot of a baseball player's strike zone where the most power and strength can be utilized
- An English language idiom derived from the baseball jargon, meaning area of knowledge

== Music ==
- Wheelhouse (album), a 2013 album by Brad Paisley
- Wheelhouse Records, an imprint of BBR Music Group

== Other uses ==
- Wheelhouse (surname)
- Wheelhouse Magazine, an online progressive arts and politics magazine
- Wheelhouse Maritime Museum, museum run by the Underwater Society of Ottawa
