= 1997 ARDC AMSCAR series =

The 1997 ARDC AMSCAR Sedan Series was an Australian touring car series and was run for cars eligible to V8 Supercar specifications, although the series was not sanctioned by AVESCO. It began on 22 June 1997 at Eastern Creek Raceway and ended on 7 December at Eastern Creek Raceway after four rounds.

The series was run by the Australian Racing Drivers Club (ARDC) over the two circuits operated by the club in Sydney, Australia. It was the last such series to bear the AMSCAR name having been last run previously during the 1994 season. The series itself dated back to the Amaroo Park-based Sun-7 Chesterfield Series of the 1970s.

The 1997 series can be seen as the immediate fore-runner for today's Dunlop V8 Supercar Series, acting as a second tier series for touring cars contested by privately owned and funded touring car teams, known colloquially as 'privateers'.

== Teams and drivers ==
The following drivers and teams competed in the 1997 AMSCAR series. The series consisted of four rounds.

Team	Car	No	Drivers
Clive Wiseman Racing	Holden VP Commodore; Holden VS Commodore	7	(Australia) Mick Donaher
Gary Cannan	Holden VL Commodore SS Group A SV	8	(Australia) Gary Cannan
Simon Emerzidis	Holden VR Commodore	15	(Australia) Simon Emerzidis
Walden Motorsport	Holden VP Commodore	21	(Australia) Brian Walden
Tim Slako	Holden VS Commodore	24	(Australia) Tim Slako
M3 Motorsport	Holden VP Commodore	26	(Australia) Peter Doulman
Playscape Racing	Ford EF Falcon	28	(Australia) Kevin Waldock
Paul Weel Racing	Ford EL Falcon	31	(Australia) Paul Weel
West Coast Racing	Ford EL Falcon	32	(Australia) Allan McCarthy
Pro-Duct Racing	Holden VS Commodore	33	(Australia) Bob Pearson
Schembri Motorsport	Holden VS Commodore	36	(Australia) Neil Schembri
Scotty Taylor Racing	Holden VP Commodore	37	(Australia) Bill Attard (Australia) Scotty Taylor
Garry Willmington Performance	Ford EB Falcon	41	(Australia) Garry Willmington
Mal Rose Racing	Holden VS Commodore	44	(Australia) Mal Rose
V8Racing	Holden VP Commodore	77	(Australia) Richard Mork
Cadillac Productions	Ford EB Falcon	79	(Australia) Mike Conway
Cadillac Productions	Holden VP Commodore	92	(Australia) Gavin Monaghan
Don Pulver	Holden VP Commodore	88	(Australia) Don Pulver
Geoff Kendrick	Holden VS Commodore	92	(Australia) Geoff Kendrick
Shaun Walker	Holden VS Commodore	99	(Australia) Shaun Walker

== Results and standings ==
=== Race calendar ===
The 1997 AMSCAR season consisted of 4 rounds.

Rd.	Race title	Circuit	City / state	Date	Winner	Team	Report
1	(Australia) Eastern Creek	Eastern Creek Raceway	Sydney, New South Wales	21–22 Jun	Allan McCarthy	West Coast Racing	
2	(Australia) Amaroo Park	Amaroo Park	Sydney, New South Wales	19–20 Jul	Mal Rose	Mal Rose Racing	
3	(Australia) Eastern Creek	Eastern Creek Raceway	Sydney, New South Wales	30–31 Aug	Mal Rose	Mal Rose Racing	
4	(Australia) Eastern Creek	Eastern Creek Raceway	Sydney, New South Wales	6–7 Dec	Mick Donaher	Clive Wiseman Racing	

=== Drivers Championship ===
Points were allocated 18–14–11–9–7–5–4–3–2–1 according to top ten race position in each race with three races being held per round.

Pos	Driver	Round 1 – EAS 1			Round 2 – AMA 1			Round 3 – EAS 2			Round 4 – EAS 3			Pts
Pos	Driver	Race 1	Race 2	Race 3	Race 1	Race 2	Race 3	Race 1	Race 2	Race 3	Race 1	Race 2	Race 3	Pts
1	Mal Rose	4th	2nd	Ret	1st	1st	1st	1st	1st	1st	2nd	3rd	3rd	167
2	Mick Donaher	3rd	3rd	2nd	3rd	4th	3rd				1st	1st	1st	121
3	Allan McCarthy	1st	1st	1st	4th	2nd	2nd							91
4	Neil Schembri	6th	13th	3rd	8th	5th	5th	3rd	5th	3rd	Ret	6th	2nd	81
5	Bob Pearson	2nd	9th	4th				5th	2nd	2nd	5th	Ret	6th	72
6	Peter Doulman	Ret	8th	8th	2nd	Ret	DNS	2nd	3rd	5th				52
7	Mike Conway				5th	8th	6th				4th	2nd	5th	45
8	Richard Mork	Ret	Ret	5th	12th	9th	8th	6th	6th	6th	6th	7th	7th	40
9	Geoff Kendrick	10th	10th	9th				4th	4th	4th				31
10	Paul Weel										3rd	4th	4th	29
11	Garry Willmington	8th	7th	6th	6th	DNS	DNS	8th	7th	7th				28
12	Tim Slako	Ret	4th	10th	9th	3rd	DNS							23
13	Bill Attard	7th	6th	7th	10th	7th	7th							22
14	Gavin Monaghan				7th	6th	4th							18
15	Kevin Waldock	5th	5th	11th										14
15	Simon Emerzidis										7th	5th	8th	14
17	Don Pulver	Ret	11th	Ret	11th	Ret	10th	7th	8th	8th				11
18	Gary Cannan	9th	12th	12th	13th	10th	9th	10th	10th	9th				9
19	Scotty Taylor							9th	9th	10th				5
	Brian Walden	11th	Ret	13th										
Pos	Driver	Race 1	Race 2	Race 3	Race 1	Race 2	Race 3	Race 1	Race 2	Race 3	Race 1	Race 2	Race 3	Pts

Colour	Result
Gold	Winner
Silver	Second place
Bronze	Third place
Green	Points finish
Blue	Non-points finish
Blue	Non-classified finish (NC)
Purple	Retired (Ret)
Red	Did not qualify (DNQ)
Red	Did not pre-qualify (DNPQ)
Black	Disqualified (DSQ)
White	Did not start (DNS)
White	Withdrew (WD)
White	Race cancelled (C)
Blank	Did not practice (DNP)
Blank	Did not arrive (DNA)
Blank	Excluded (EX)
