= Wheels (disambiguation) =

Wheels is the plural of wheel.

Wheels or WHEELS may also refer to:

== Arts and entertainment ==
=== Music ===
==== Performers ====
- The Wheels, a 1960s R&B and blues-influenced rock band

==== Albums and EPs ====
- Wheels (Restless Heart album) (1986)
- Wheels (The Road Hammers album) (2014)
- Wheels (Dan Tyminski album) (2008)
- Wheels, a 2006 album by Hometown News
- Wheels (EP), 2005, by Cake

==== Songs ====
- "Wheels" (Restless Heart song), 1987
- "Wheels" (The String-A-Longs song), 1960
- "Wheels", a 1969 song by The Flying Burrito Brothers from their album The Gilded Palace of Sin
- "Wheels", a 2004 song by Cake from their album Pressure Chief
- "Wheels" (Foo Fighters song), 2009
- "Wheels", a 2008 song by AC/DC from their album Black Ice
- "Wheels", a song by Hüsker Dü from Everything Falls Apart

=== Television ===
- Wheels (TV series), a car and motorbike program on BBC World News India
- "Wheels" (Adventure Time), a 2017 episode
- "Wheels" (Frank Stubbs Promotes), a 1993 episode
- "Wheels" (Glee), a 2009 episode
- "Wheels" (The Upper Hand), a 1991 episode
- Helen Wheels (Ben 10), a character
- "Wheels", a 2010 episode of Pocoyo

=== Other arts and entertainment ===
- Wheels (novel), by Arthur Hailey
- Wheels (film), a 1998 Yugoslav black comedy

== Transportation-related ==
- Slang for automobile
- Wheels (California), a bus service in southeast Alameda County
- Wheels (New Jersey Transit), a suburban bus service
- WHEELS, the Norwalk Transit District bus system
- Wheels (magazine), an Australian automotive magazine
- Wheels Magazine (Sweden), ah automotive magazine

== Sports teams ==
- Detroit Wheels (1973–1974), of the former World Football League
- Detroit Wheels (soccer) (1994–1995), a former soccer team
- Detroit Wheels (2004–2006), former name of the Detroit Panthers (PBL) minor league basketball team
- Ottawa Wheels (1997), a former Canadian roller hockey team

== Other uses ==
- Wheels (nickname), a list of people and a fictional character
- Wheels, a third-party operating system for the Commodore 64 and 128 computers
- Wheels Entertainments, a company that operates transportable Ferris wheels
- Washington Heights Expeditionary Learning School
- Wheels, another name for the Ophanim in Judeo-Christian tradition
- In horology, a term for gears
- Wheels, a fictional character of the Burger King Kids Club advertising campaign
- Wheels, a North American name for Speed Race, a 1974 arcade video game

== See also ==
- Wheel (disambiguation)
