= Wheeling =

Wheeling can refer to:

== Places in the United States of America ==
- Wheeling, Illinois
- Wheeling, Carroll County, Indiana
- Wheeling, Delaware County, Indiana
- Wheeling, Gibson County, Indiana
- Wheeling, a populated place in Winn Parish, Louisiana where Thomas Simpson Woodward lived
- Wheeling, Missouri
- Wheeling, West Virginia
- Wheeling Creek (Ohio), a tributary of the Ohio River in West Virginia
- Wheeling Creek (West Virginia)
- Wheeling Island in the Ohio River

== Other uses ==
- Wheeling (electric power transmission)
- Wheeling (see breaking wheel), a form of torture
- "Wheeling", an American slang term for off-roading, a type of off-road motorsport
- Wheeling, a technique for the cold forming of sheet metal into complex shapes using the English wheel
- The Wheeling, common short name for the Wheeling and Lake Erie Railway (1990)
- Fort Wheeling or simply Wheeling, a comics series by Hugo Pratt
- Lottery Wheeling
- Wheeling Jesuit University

== See also ==
- Wheel (disambiguation)
