= Wheels (nickname) =

Wheels is the nickname of:

- Eric Magennis (born 1937 or 1938), Australian Paralympic lawn bowls player and archer
- Michael Russell (tennis) (born 1978), American tennis player
- Matthew Whelan (born 1979), former Australian rules football player
- Brian Wheeler, play-by-play radio announcer for the Portland Trail Blazers of the National Basketball Association
- Chris Wheeler (born 1945), former announcer and color commentator for the Philadelphia Phillies of Major League Baseball
- Derek Wheeler, a fictional character on the TV series Degrassi Junior High and Degrassi High

== See also ==
- Elbert Dubenion (1933–2019), American football player nicknamed "Golden Wheels"
- Steve Wozniak (born 1950), American inventor, electronics engineer, computer programmer and co-founder of Apple Computer, whose nickname "WoZ" stands for "Wheels of Zeus"
