= Samuel Wheelhouse =

- Born: 12 February 1994 (age 32); Nottingham
- Education: Nottingham High School, Loughborough University
- Known for: Autodock, Man Overboard
- Awards: WCSIM Young Engineer of the Year 2013 Intel ISEF 3rd (Elec and Mech)

Samuel Wheelhouse is a British inventor and engineer. His work includes the AutoDock and Man Overboard! systems.

Autodock was designed in 2010. It was designed to aid the docking of large ships and yachts using a combination of thrusters and sensors.

The following year Wheelhouse also developed Man Overboard. The device can be used to detect crew members falling overboard ships in heavy seas. The project uses multiple technologies that are not available with current solutions. Both projects were developed during his final two years at Nottingham High School.

He is also an Arkwright scholar and was sponsored by the Lloyd's Register who were responsible for funding his projects.

The Autodock system placed him in the top 5 in the National Science and Engineering Competition 2012.

The following year his Man Overboard! project was awarded East Midlands Regional Winner of the National Science and Engineering Competition 2012. He then proceeded to win the WCSIM Young Engineer of The Year 2013 at the Big Bang Fair in London. He was later invited to represent the United Kingdom at the Intel International Science and Engineering Fair in Phoenix, AZ USA. His Man Overboard! project was awarded 3rd in the Electrical and Mechanical Engineering category of the Intel International Science and Engineering Fair.

Samuel has now been made an apprentice to the Worshipful Company of Scientific Instrument Makers (who sponsored him through the Intel ISEF). He is also currently trying to commercialise his projects. He now studies Mechanical Engineering at Loughborough University and is expected to graduate in 2016.
