= Big wheel =

Big wheel may refer to:

- Big Wheel (tricycle), a low-riding tricycle, usually made of plastic, with an oversized front wheel.
- Ferris wheel, commonly called a "big wheel" in the United Kingdom
- Ding Dong snack cakes, also marketed under the brand name "Big Wheel"
- Fisher's Big Wheel, a defunct department store chain based in Pennsylvania
- Big Six wheel, a game of chance often played in casinos
- "Big Wheel", a nickname of baseball player Lance Parrish
- Big Wheel/Rossi, a chain of automotive parts stores acquired by O'Reilly Auto Parts

== Music ==
- "Big Wheels," a song by Electric Light Orchestra from Out of the Blue
- "Big Wheels" (Down with Webster song), a 2011 song by Down with Webster
- "Big Wheels," a song by Llama Farmers from Dead Letter Chorus, 1999
- "Big Wheels," Alan Thicke's original theme song for Wheel of Fortune
- Big Wheel (Icehouse album), 1993
- Big Wheel (Aaron Pritchett album), 2006
- Big Wheel (song), a 2007 single by Tori Amos
- The Big Wheel (album), a 1991 album by Runrig
- "The Big Wheel," a song from the 1991 album Roll the Bones by Rush
- "Big Wheel," a song from the 2020 album The Baby by Samia
- Big Wheel, Dutch band featuring Cyril Havermans

== Media ==
- The Big Wheel (film), a 1949 film starring Mickey Rooney
- Big Wheel (The Price Is Right), a wheel used in the "Showcase Showdown" segment of the television game show The Price Is Right (since 1975)
- Big Wheel (character) (Jackson Weele), a Marvel Comics supervillain and foe of Spider-Man and Rocket Racer
- "The Big Wheel", the 22nd episode of season 4 of Criminal Minds
