= Wheal =

Wheal may refer to:

- Wheals, a type of skin lesion
- Brad Wheal (born 1996), British cricketer
- Donald James Wheal (1931–2008), British television writer, novelist and non-fiction writer
- David John Wheal, Australian businessman
- "The Wheal", a 1987 song by Coil

== See also ==
- Mining in Cornwall and Devon, includes mines whose names include Wheal
- Wheel (disambiguation)
