= Paul Weel =

Australian racing driver (born 1979)

- Nationality: Australian
- Born: Paul Anthony Weel; 21 July 1979 (age 47) Geelong, Victoria
- Relatives: Kees Weel (father); Emma Weel (wife)

Boost Mobile Super Trucks
- Years active: 2020–2021
- Car number: 50
- Starts: 12
- Wins: 2
- Podiums: 5
- Poles: 1
- Best finish: 3rd in 2021
- Finished last season: 3rd (2021)

Previous series
- 1998–2008 1997: V8 Supercars; AMSCAR Series

Supercars Championship career
- Championships: 0
- Races: 102
- Wins: 0
- Podiums: 1
- Pole positions: 0
- Statistics up to date as of 9 December 2021.

Paul Anthony Weel (born 21 July 1979) is an Australian racing driver who has competed in the V8 Supercars, Boost Mobile Super Trucks, and SCORE International.

He lives on the Gold Coast.

== Racing career ==
As a V8 Supercars driver, Weel raced 12 seasons in the series with a best finish of third at the 2003 Clipsal 500; he initially finished fourth, but a penalty for Russell Ingall promoted Weel onto the podium. His best enduro finish was a fifth at the 2002 Queensland 500 and best Bathurst 1000 finish was eighth in 1999.

From 2006, Weel decided to retire from full-time driving to devote more time to his PWR Performance Products business. On 10 October 2008, Weel was involved in a massive crash during a practice session at Bathurst; his stopped car was hit by Chris Pither in the Reid Park sector, leading to back fractures, a split spleen, and punctured lung. In 2009, he participated in the Sepang 12 Hours and finished fifth overall.

Weel returned to driving when he joined the Boost Mobile Super Trucks in 2020. At Hidden Valley Raceway in June 2021, his truck flipped multiple times after making contact with Dave Casey on a ramp. The following month at Reid Park Street Circuit saw him win the final two races for his first career overall weekend victory.

In 2022, Weel and fellow Boost Mobile Super Trucks driver Toby Price formed Team Australia to compete in American desert racing. The team won for the first time at the SCORE International Baja 500 in 2024.

== Career results ==
| Season | Series | Position | Car | Team |
|---|---|---|---|---|
| 1997 | AMSCAR Series | 10th | Ford Falcon (EL) | Paul Weel Racing |
| 1998 | Australian Touring Car Championship | 31st | Ford Falcon (EL) | Paul Weel Racing |
| 1999 | Shell Championship Series | 24th | Ford Falcon (AU) | Paul Weel Racing |
| 2000 | Shell Championship Series | 22nd | Ford Falcon (AU) | Paul Weel Racing |
| 2001 | Shell Championship Series | 20th | Ford Falcon (AU) | Paul Weel Racing |
| 2002 | V8 Supercar Championship Series | 22nd | Ford Falcon (AU) | Paul Weel Racing; Stone Brothers Racing |
| 2003 | V8 Supercar Championship Series | 13th | Holden Commodore (VX) | Team Brock |
| 2004 | V8 Supercar Championship Series | 17th | Holden Commodore (VY) | Paul Weel Racing |
| 2005 | V8 Supercar Championship Series | 22nd | Holden Commodore (VZ) | Supercheap Auto Racing |
| 2006 | V8 Supercar Championship Series | 40th | Holden Commodore (VZ) | Supercheap Auto Racing |
| 2007 | V8 Supercar Championship Series | 29th | Holden Commodore (VE) | Supercheap Auto Racing |
| 2008 | V8 Supercar Championship Series | 59th | Holden Commodore (VE) | Paul Weel Racing |
| 2020 | Boost Mobile Super Trucks | N/A | Stadium Super Truck | Paul Weel Racing |
| 2021 | Boost Mobile Super Trucks | **3rd** | Stadium Super Truck | Paul Weel Racing |

=== Complete Bathurst 1000 results ===
| Year | Class | Team | Car | Co-driver | Position | Laps |
|---|---|---|---|---|---|---|
| 1998 | OC | Paul Weel Racing | Ford Falcon (EL) | (Australia) Neal Bates | 9th | 155 |
| 1999 | | Paul Weel Racing | Ford Falcon (AU) | (Australia) Greg Crick | 8th | 160 |
| 2000 | | Paul Weel Racing | Ford AU Falcon | (Australia) Greg Crick | 14th | 157 |
| 2001 | | Paul Weel Racing | Ford AU Falcon | (Australia) Tim Leahey | DNF | 127 |
| 2002 | | Stone Brothers Racing | Ford AU Falcon | (Australia) Marcos Ambrose | 21st | 154 |
| 2003 | | Paul Weel Racing | Holden Commodore (VX) | (Australia) Jason Bright | DNF | 44 |
| 2004 | | Paul Weel Racing | Holden Commodore (VY) | (Australia) Jason Bright | 12th | 159 |
| 2005 | | Paul Weel Racing | Holden Commodore (VZ) | (New Zealand) Greg Murphy | DNF | 144 |
| 2006 | | Paul Weel Racing | Holden VZ Commodore | (Australia) Nathan Pretty | 8th | 161 |
| 2007 | | Paul Weel Racing | Holden Commodore (VE) | (Australia) Paul Dumbrell | 12th | 159 |
| 2008 | | Paul Weel Racing | Holden VE Commodore | (Australia) Andrew Thompson | DNS | |

=== Supercars Championship results ===
(Races in bold indicate pole position) (Races in italics indicate fastest lap)

Supercars results
| Year | Team | Car | 1 | 2 | 3 | 4 | 5 | 6 | 7 | 8 | 9 | 10 | 11 | 12 | 13 | 14 | 15 | 16 | 17 | 18 | 19 | 20 | 21 | 22 | 23 | 24 | 25 | 26 | 27 | 28 | 29 | 30 | 31 | 32 | 33 | 34 | 35 | 36 | 37 | 38 | Position | Points |
|---|---|---|---|---|---|---|---|---|---|---|---|---|---|---|---|---|---|---|---|---|---|---|---|---|---|---|---|---|---|---|---|---|---|---|---|---|---|---|---|---|---|---|
| 1998 | Paul Weel Racing | Ford Falcon (EL) | SAN; R1; 20 | SAN; R2; Ret | SAN; R3; Ret | SYM; R4; 20 | SYM; R5; Ret | SYM; R6; 22 | LAK; R7; 22 | LAK; R8; 23 | LAK; R9; 20 | PHI; R10; 28 | PHI; R11; 20 | PHI; R12; 18 | WIN; R13; 27 | WIN; R14; Ret | WIN; R15; 15 | MAL; R16; 24 | MAL; R17; 28 | MAL; R18; Ret | BAR; R19 | BAR; R20 | BAR; R21 | CAL; R22 | CAL; R23 | CAL; R24 | HDV; R25; Ret | HDV; R26; DNS | HDV; R27; 17 | ORA; R28; Ret | ORA; R29; 22 | ORA; R30; 26 | | | | | | | | | 31st | 32 |
| 1999 | Paul Weel Racing | Ford Falcon (AU) | EAS; R1; DNS | EAS; R2; DNS | EAS; R3; DNS | ADE; R4 | BAR; R5 | BAR; R6 | BAR; R7 | PHI; R8; 21 | PHI; R9; 18 | PHI; R10; 15 | HDV; R11; 18 | HDV; R12; 18 | HDV; R13; 23 | SAN; R14; 21 | SAN; R15; 23 | SAN; R16; 21 | QLD; R17; 27 | QLD; R18; Ret | QLD; R19; Ret | CAL; R20; Ret | CAL; R21; 22 | CAL; R22; 19 | SYM; R23; 23 | SYM; R24; 14 | SYM; R25; 10 | WIN; R26; Ret | WIN; R27; 24 | WIN; R28; 20 | ORA; R29; 27 | ORA; R30; Ret | ORA; R31; 15 | QLD; R32; 14 | BAT; R33; 8 | | | | | | 24th | 536 |
| 2000 | Paul Weel Racing | Ford Falcon (AU) | PHI; R1; 12 | PHI; R2; 15 | BAR; R3; 15 | BAR; R4; 12 | BAR; R5; 11 | ADE; R6; Ret | ADE; R7; 22 | EAS; R8; 30 | EAS; R9; 23 | EAS; R10; 13 | HDV; R11; Ret | HDV; R12; 19 | HDV; R13; 17 | CAN; R14; 5 | CAN; R15; 18 | CAN; R16; Ret | QLD; R17; 13 | QLD; R18; 14 | QLD; R19; 14 | WIN; R20; Ret | WIN; R21; 26 | WIN; R22; 11 | ORA; R23; 30 | ORA; R24; 15 | ORA; R25; 16 | CAL; R26; 16 | CAL; R27; 16 | CAL; R28; Ret | QLD; R29; Ret | SAN; R30; 15 | SAN; R31; 8 | SAN; R32; 9 | BAT; R33; 14 | | | | | | 22nd | 403 |
| 2001 | Paul Weel Racing | Ford Falcon (AU) | PHI; R1; 15 | PHI; R2; 25 | ADE; R3; Ret | ADE; R4; Ret | EAS; R5; 8 | EAS; R6; 23 | HDV; R7; 15 | HDV; R8; 14 | HDV; R9; 19 | CAN; R10; 16 | CAN; R11; 8 | CAN; R12; Ret | BAR; R13; 16 | BAR; R14; 18 | BAR; R15; 14 | CAL; R16; 22 | CAL; R17; 19 | CAL; R18; 20 | ORA; R19; 22 | ORA; R20; 17 | QLD; R21; 7 | WIN; R22; 23 | WIN; R23; 12 | BAT; R24; Ret | PUK; R25; 13 | PUK; R26; 11 | PUK; R27; Ret | SAN; R28; 21 | SAN; R29; 16 | SAN; R30; Ret | | | | | | | | | 20th | 1307 |
| 2002 | Paul Weel Racing | Ford Falcon (AU) | ADE; R1; Ret | ADE; R2; 13 | PHI; R3; 25 | PHI; R4; 11 | EAS; R5; 25 | EAS; R6; 30 | EAS; R7; 26 | HDV; R8; 22 | HDV; R9; 12 | HDV; R10; Ret | CAN; R11; 13 | CAN; R12; Ret | CAN; R13; Ret | BAR; R14; 11 | BAR; R15; 21 | BAR; R16; 27 | ORA; R17; Ret | ORA; R18; Ret | WIN; R19; 34 | WIN; R20; 32 | QLD; R21 | BAT; R22 | SUR; R23; 9 | SUR; R24; 20 | PUK; R25; 21 | PUK; R26; 21 | PUK; R27; 6 | SAN; R28; 13 | SAN; R29; 9 | | | | | | | | | | 22nd | 468 |
| 2002 | Stone Brothers Racing | Ford Falcon (AU) | ADE; R1 | ADE; R2 | PHI; R3 | PHI; R4 | EAS; R5 | EAS; R6 | EAS; R7 | HDV; R8 | HDV; R9 | HDV; R10 | CAN; R11 | CAN; R12 | CAN; R13 | BAR; R14 | BAR; R15 | BAR; R16 | ORA; R17 | ORA; R18 | WIN; R19 | WIN; R20 | QLD; R21; 5 | BAT; R22; 21 | SUR; R23 | SUR; R24 | PUK; R25 | PUK; R26 | PUK; R27 | SAN; R28 | SAN; R29 | | | | | | | | | | 22nd | 468 |
| 2003 | Paul Weel Racing | Holden Commodore (VX) | ADE; R1; 14 | ADE; R1; 3 | PHI; R3; 8 | EAS; R4; 11 | WIN; R5; 5 | BAR; R6; 13 | BAR; R7; 6 | BAR; R8; 7 | HDV; R9; 12 | HDV; R10; 11 | HDV; R11; 13 | QLD; R12; 10 | ORA; R13; 16 | SAN; R14; 22 | BAT; R15; Ret | SUR; R16; 13 | SUR; R17; 16 | PUK; R18; 15 | PUK; R19; 11 | PUK; R20; 12 | EAS; R21; 29 | EAS; R22; Ret | | | | | | | | | | | | | | | | | 13th | 1450 |
| 2004 | Paul Weel Racing | Holden Commodore (VY) | ADE; R1; 5 | ADE; R2; 4 | EAS; R3; 29 | PUK; R4; 11 | PUK; R5; 6 | PUK; R6; 6 | HDV; R7; 17 | HDV; R8; 8 | HDV; R9; Ret | BAR; R10; 10 | BAR; R11; 14 | BAR; R12; 5 | QLD; R13; Ret | WIN; R14; Ret | ORA; R15; 9 | ORA; R16; 5 | SAN; R17; 10 | BAT; R18; 12 | SUR; R19; 26 | SUR; R20; 15 | SYM; R21; 18 | SYM; R22; 27 | SYM; R23; Ret | EAS; R24; DNS | EAS; R25; 17 | EAS; R26; 26 | | | | | | | | | | | | | 17th | 1192 |
| 2005 | Paul Weel Racing | Holden Commodore (VZ) | ADE; R1; 11 | ADE; R2; 8 | PUK; R3; 11 | PUK; R4; 9 | PUK; R5; 10 | BAR; R6; 27 | BAR; R7; 6 | BAR; R8; 4 | EAS; R9; 27 | EAS; R10; 26 | SHA; R11; 20 | SHA; R12; 11 | SHA; R13; 19 | HDV; R14; 26 | HDV; R15; 26 | HDV; R16; 14 | QLD; R17; Ret | ORA; R18; 14 | ORA; R19; 14 | SAN; R20; Ret | BAT; R21; Ret | SUR; R22; Ret | SUR; R23; 22 | SUR; R24; 16 | SYM; R25; 13 | SYM; R26; 24 | SYM; R27; 21 | PHI; R28; 10 | PHI; R29; 9 | PHI; R30; 9 | | | | | | | | | 22nd | 1000 |
| 2006 | Paul Weel Racing | Holden Commodore (VZ) | ADE; R1 | ADE; R2 | PUK; R3 | PUK; R4 | PUK; R5 | BAR; R6 | BAR; R7 | BAR; R8 | WIN; R9 | WIN; R10 | WIN; R11 | HDV; R12 | HDV; R13 | HDV; R14 | QLD; R15 | QLD; R16 | QLD; R17 | ORA; R18 | ORA; R19 | ORA; R20 | SAN; R21; 10 | BAT; R22; 8 | SUR; R23 | SUR; R24 | SUR; R25 | SYM; R26 | SYM; R27 | SYM; R28 | BHR; R29 | BHR; R30 | BHR; R31 | PHI; R32 | PHI; R33 | PHI; R34 | | | | | 40th | 250 |
| 2007 | Paul Weel Racing | Holden Commodore (VE) | ADE; R1 | ADE; R2 | BAR; R3 | BAR; R4 | BAR; R5 | PUK; R6 | PUK; R7 | PUK; R8 | WIN; R9 | WIN; R10 | WIN; R11 | EAS; R12 | EAS; R13 | EAS; R14 | HDV; R15 | HDV; R16 | HDV; R17 | QLD; R18; 22 | QLD; R19; Ret | QLD; R20; Ret | ORA; R21 | ORA; R22 | ORA; R23 | SAN; R24; 6 | BAT; R25; 12 | SUR; R26 | SUR; R27 | SUR; R28 | BHR; R29 | BHR; R30 | BHR; R31 | SYM; R32 | SYM; R33 | SYM; R34 | PHI; R35 | PHI; R36 | PHI; R37 | | 29th | 51 |
| 2008 | Paul Weel Racing | Holden Commodore (VE) | ADE; R1 | ADE; R2 | EAS; R3 | EAS; R4 | EAS; R5 | HAM; R6 | HAM; R7 | HAM; R8 | BAR; R9 | BAR; R10 | BAR; R11 | SAN; R12 | SAN; R13 | SAN; R14 | HDV; R15 | HDV; R16 | HDV; R17 | QLD; R18 | QLD; R19 | QLD; R20 | WIN; R21 | WIN; R22 | WIN; R23 | PHI; Q 22 | PHI; R24; Ret | BAT; R25; DNS | SUR; R26 | SUR; R27 | SUR; R28 | BHR; R29 | BHR; R30 | BHR; R31 | SYM; R32 | SYM; R33 | SYM; R34 | ORA; R35 | ORA; R36 | ORA; R37 | 59th | 84 |

=== Boost Mobile Super Trucks ===
(key) (Bold – Pole position. Italics – Fastest qualifier. * – Most laps led.)

Boost Mobile Super Trucks results
| Year | 1 | 2 | 3 | 4 | 5 | 6 | 7 | 8 | 9 | BMSTC | Pts | Ref |
|---|---|---|---|---|---|---|---|---|---|---|---|---|
| 2020 | ADE; 5 | ADE; 4 | ADE; 7 | | | | | | | N/A^{1} | – | |
| 2021 | SYM; 3 | SYM; 3 | SYM; 4 | HID; 9 | HID; 5 | HID; 3 | TOW; 5 | TOW; 1 | TOW; 1 | 3rd | 84 | |

^{*} Season in progress.
^{1} Standings were not recorded by the series for the 2020 season.
