= 2014–15 New Zealand V8 season =

2014–15 New Zealand V8s season

Seasons
- ← 2013–14 2015–16 →

The 2014–15 New Zealand V8 season was the sixteenth season of the series, under the NZV8 guise. The season began at the Hampton Downs Motorsport Park on 1–2 November 2014 and finished at the Pukekohe Park Raceway on 11–12 April after six championship meetings. Nick Ross was the reigning TLX champion, and whilst James McLaughlin won the TL Championship, graduated into the TLX class to battle for the title. The TLX Championship eventually was won by Jason Bargwanna and the TL Championship was won by Kevin Williams.

== Race calendar ==
Rnd	Circuit	Date	Map
2014			2014–15 New Zealand V8 season is located in New Zealand
1	Hampton Downs Motorsport Park (Hampton Downs, Waikato)	1–2 November	2014–15 New Zealand V8 season is located in New Zealand
2	Pukekohe Park Raceway (Pukekohe, Auckland Region)	29–30 November	2014–15 New Zealand V8 season is located in New Zealand
2015			2014–15 New Zealand V8 season is located in New Zealand
3	Mike Pero Motorsport Park (Christchurch, Canterbury Region)	17–18 January	2014–15 New Zealand V8 season is located in New Zealand
4	Teretonga Park (Invercargill, Southland Region)	24–25 January	2014–15 New Zealand V8 season is located in New Zealand
5	Manfeild Autocourse (Feilding, Manawatū District)	14–15 February	2014–15 New Zealand V8 season is located in New Zealand
6	Pukekohe Park Raceway (Pukekohe, Auckland Region)	11–12 April	2014–15 New Zealand V8 season is located in New Zealand

== Teams and drivers ==
TLX Championship
Manufacturer	Vehicle	Team	No	Driver	Rounds
Holden	Commodore (VE)	Concept Motorsport	007	(New Zealand) Ian Booth	1–2
Holden	Commodore (VE)	Concept Motorsport	007	(New Zealand) Bronson Porter	3
Holden	Commodore (VE)	Concept Motorsport	007	(New Zealand) Simon Richards	4
Holden	Commodore (VE)	Concept Motorsport	007	(New Zealand) James McLaughlin	5–6
Holden	Commodore (VE)	No Fea Racing Team	84	(New Zealand) Lance Hughes	All
Nissan	Altima (L33)	Concept Motorsport	1	(New Zealand) Nick Ross	1–4
Toyota	Camry (XV50)	Richards Team Motorsport	02	(Australia) Jason Bargwanna	All
Toyota	Camry (XV50)	Richards Team Motorsport	22	(Australia) Scott Taylor	All
TL Championship
Manufacturer	Vehicle	Team	No	Driver	Rounds
Ford	Ford Falcon (BF)	Team Aegis Racing	3	(New Zealand) Brad Lauder	6
Ford	Ford Falcon (BF)	Jamie Gaskin Racing	5	(New Zealand) James Gaskin	3–4
Ford	Ford Falcon (BF)	Steve Taylor Racing	33	(New Zealand) Steve Taylor	All
Ford	Ford Falcon (BF)	Liam MacDonald Racing	69	(New Zealand) Liam MacDonald	3–4
Ford	Ford Falcon (BF)	Brad Lathrope Racing	73	(New Zealand) Brad Lathrope	All
Ford	Ford Falcon (BF)	Enzed Racing Team	99	(New Zealand) Grant Molloy	3–6
Ford	Ford Falcon (BF)	Brock Cooley Motorsport	111	(New Zealand) Brock Cooley	1–2, 5–6
Holden	Commodore (VY)	James McLaughlin Motorsport	2	(New Zealand) James McLaughlin	1
Holden	Commodore (VY)	Adam Newell Racing	2	(New Zealand) Adam Newell	5–6
Holden	Commodore (VY)	Kevin Williams Racing	8	(New Zealand) Kevin Williams	All
Holden	Commodore (VY)	Team Kiwi Racing	21	(New Zealand) Craig Baird	1–3, 5
Holden	Commodore (VY)	Brendan Murphy Racing	23	(New Zealand) Brendan Murphy	1–5
Holden	Commodore (VY)	Nathan Pilcher Racing	55	(New Zealand) Nathan Pilcher	All
Holden	Commodore (VY)	ITM Racing	70	(New Zealand) Andrew Anderson	1

== Results and standings ==
=== Season summary ===
Round		Circuit	Pole position	Fastest lap	Winning TLX driver	Winning TL driver
1	R1	Hampton Downs Motorsport Park	(Australia) Jason Bargwanna	(New Zealand) Nick Ross	(Australia) Jason Bargwanna	(New Zealand) Kevin Williams
1	R2	Hampton Downs Motorsport Park		(New Zealand) Nick Ross	(Australia) Jason Bargwanna	(New Zealand) Craig Baird
1	R3	Hampton Downs Motorsport Park		(Australia) Jason Bargwanna	(New Zealand) Nick Ross	(New Zealand) Craig Baird
1	R1	Pukekohe Park Raceway	(Australia) Jason Bargwanna	(Australia) Jason Bargwanna	(Australia) Jason Bargwanna	(New Zealand) Kevin Williams
1	R2	Pukekohe Park Raceway		(Australia) Jason Bargwanna	(Australia) Jason Bargwanna	(New Zealand) Kevin Williams
1	R3	Pukekohe Park Raceway		(Australia) Jason Bargwanna	(New Zealand) Nick Ross	(New Zealand) Kevin Williams
3	R1	Mike Pero Motorsport Park	(Australia) Jason Bargwanna	(Australia) Jason Bargwanna	(Australia) Jason Bargwanna	(New Zealand) Kevin Williams
3	R2	Mike Pero Motorsport Park		(Australia) Jason Bargwanna	(Australia) Jason Bargwanna	(New Zealand) Kevin Williams
3	R3	Mike Pero Motorsport Park		(Australia) Jason Bargwanna	(Australia) Jason Bargwanna	(New Zealand) Kevin Williams
4	R1	Teretonga Park	(Australia) Jason Bargwanna	(New Zealand) Nick Ross	(Australia) Jason Bargwanna	(New Zealand) Kevin Williams
4	R2	Teretonga Park		(Australia) Jason Bargwanna	(New Zealand) Nick Ross	(New Zealand) Kevin Williams
4	R3	Teretonga Park		(Australia) Jason Bargwanna	(Australia) Jason Bargwanna	(New Zealand) Kevin Williams
5	R1	Manfeild Autocourse	(Australia) Jason Bargwanna	(Australia) Jason Bargwanna	(Australia) Jason Bargwanna	(New Zealand) Kevin Williams
5	R2	Manfeild Autocourse		(Australia) Jason Bargwanna	(New Zealand) Lance Hughes	(New Zealand) Kevin Williams
5	R3	Manfeild Autocourse		(Australia) Jason Bargwanna	(Australia) Jason Bargwanna	(New Zealand) Kevin Williams
6	R1	Pukekohe Park Raceway	(Australia) Jason Bargwanna	(Australia) Jason Bargwanna	(New Zealand) Nick Ross	(New Zealand) Kevin Williams
6	R2	Pukekohe Park Raceway		(Australia) Jason Bargwanna	(New Zealand) Nick Ross	(New Zealand) Kevin Williams
6	R3	Pukekohe Park Raceway		(Australia) Jason Bargwanna	(New Zealand) Nick Ross	(New Zealand) Kevin Williams

=== Championship standings ===
Pos.	Driver	HAM			PUK1			RUA			TER			MAN			PUK2			Pts
Pos.	Driver	R1	R2	R3	R1	R2	R3	R1	R2	R3	R1	R2	R3	R1	R2	R3	R1	R2	R3	Pts
1	(Australia) Jason Bargwanna	1	1	2	1	1	1	1	1	1	1	2	1	1	3	1	5	1	4	1272
2	(New Zealand) Nick Ross	2	2	1	2	2	2	2	2	Ret	2	1	Ret	2	2	2	1	2	1	1153
3	(New Zealand) Lance Hughes	3	4	4	4	3	7	Ret	12	9	4	Ret	6	3	1	4	3	3	Ret	879
4	(Australia) Scott Taylor				6	6	11	3	3	12	5	Ret	11	5	4	12	4	5	3	799
5	(New Zealand) James McLaughlin													4	Ret	3	2	4	2	302
6	(New Zealand) Ian Booth	13	3	10																288
7	(New Zealand) Simon Richards										3	Ret	2							127
8	(New Zealand) Bronson Porter							Ret	Ret	8										67
Pos.	Driver	R1	R2	R3	R1	R2	R3	R1	R2	R3	R1	R2	R3	R1	R2	R3	R1	R2	R3	Pts
Pos.	Driver	HAM			PUK1			RUA			TER			MAN			PUK2			Pts

==== TL class standings ====
Pos.	Driver	HAM			PUK1			RUA			TER			MAN			PUK2			Pts
Pos.	Driver	R1	R2	R3	R1	R2	R3	R1	R2	R3	R1	R2	R3	R1	R2	R3	R1	R2	R3	Pts
1	(New Zealand) Kevin Williams	4	6	5	5	5	3	4	4	2	6	4	3	6	5	4	11	11	1	1334
2	(New Zealand) Steve Taylor																			912
3	(New Zealand) Brad Lathorpe																			844
4	(New Zealand) Nathan Pilcher																			759
5	(New Zealand) Brendan Murphy																			631
6	(New Zealand) Grant Molloy																			631
7	(New Zealand) Craig Baird																			587
8	(New Zealand) Brock Cooley																			477
9	(New Zealand) Jamie Gaskin																			389
10	(New Zealand) Liam MacDonald																			343
11	(New Zealand) Adam Newell																			242
12	(New Zealand) Brad Lauder																			183
13	(New Zealand) James McLaughlin																			174
14	(New Zealand) Bruce Verdon																			120
15	(New Zealand) Andrew Anderson																			114
Pos.	Driver	R1	R2	R3	R1	R2	R3	R1	R2	R3	R1	R2	R3	R1	R2	R3	R1	R2	R3	Pts
Pos.	Driver	HAM			PUK1			RUA			TER			MAN			PUK2			Pts
