= 1991 New Zealand Grand Prix =

- 39th New Zealand Grand Prix
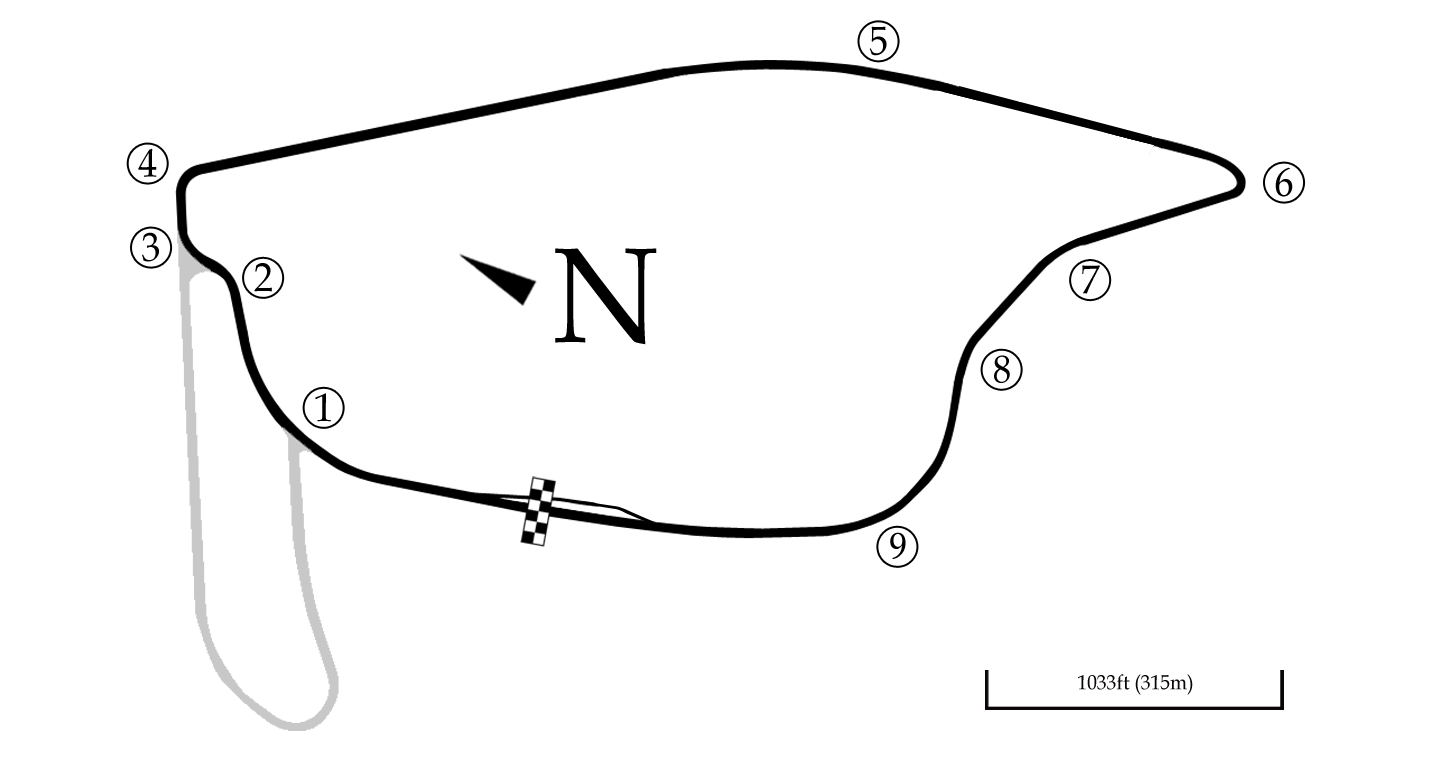

Race details
- Date: 3 February 1991
- Location: Pukekohe Park Raceway, Pukekohe, New Zealand
- Course: Permanent racing facility
- Course length: 2.82 km (1.76 miles)
- Distance: 40 laps, 112.8 km (70.4 miles)
- Weather: Overcast, later clearing

Fastest lap
Driver	(New Zealand) Paul Radisich	Reynard Motorsport
- Time: 0.57.74

Podium
First	(New Zealand) Craig Baird	Selectrix
Second	(United States) Mike Berg	Graeme Lawrence Motorsport
Third	(New Zealand) Barrie Thomlinson	Uniden

The 1991 New Zealand Grand Prix (known for commercial reasons as the 1991 Peter Jackson New Zealand Grand Prix) was a motor race utilising Formula Pacific cars that was held at the Pukekohe Park Raceway on 3 February 1991. It was the 39th running of the New Zealand Grand Prix and served as the final round of the New Zealand Formula Pacific Championship.

The event was won by Craig Baird in what would be his first of three consecutive New Zealand Grands Prix victories. He would also claim the New Zealand Formula Pacific Championship after winning the preliminary race. American driver Mike Berg would finish second in the Graeme Lawrence Motorsport entry while Barrie Thomlinson rounded out the podium. It also marked the first time since 1976 where the event was won without a Ford engine.

Following this race, the New Zealand Grand Prix marquee would be moved over to the Manfeild Autocourse until the event entered a hiatus in 1996.

== Background ==
Since the inception of the championship in 1977, the New Zealand Grand Prix had been run to Formula Pacific regulations and was run as a round of the New Zealand Formula Pacific Championship. Typically run toward the end, the 1991 iteration would serve as the season finale of the championship. Heading into the weekend, Ken Smith was leading the championship over Craig Baird by 12 points and Paul Radisich by 24 points. To win the championship, Smith needed only to finish at least within one place of Baird in both the preliminary race and the Grand Prix.

The international driver entry list consisted of three Americans - Sandy Dells, Mike Berg, and Mark Smith. It was argued that, compared to the grids from a decade before, that the competition level of the championship had dwindled and had diluted the value of the series itself.

== Race report ==
=== Preliminary race ===
The threat of rain preceding the race had teams scrambling to prepare wet-weather tyres for their contestants. Nevertheless, the adverse weather stayed away come the race start. But confusion at the start regarding the starting procedure would throw the race into chaos. Mark Smith struggled to get off the line when his engine misfired and Ken Smith had also lost first gear. The championship leader was subsequently hit from the rear by an unsighted Dean Cockerton. Despite the impact, Ken Smith was able to continue racing for the interim. Mark Smith pulled over on the first lap due to the engine while Cockerton sustained significant damage to the front right corner and was also forced to retire. Bodywork on Dells' car became dislodged although the stewards neglected to display the mechanical flag for him.

Baird assumed the lead of the race while Radisich followed suit in second place. Berg made the most of the start line carnage to work his way up to third place with Dells nestled in fourth behind him. Ken Smith meanwhile had worked his way up to the top five but would soon lost fifth gear by lap four which inhibited his speed and dropped him back down to sixth. From there, the order remained as was until the end of the race. With Baird winning and Ken Smith finishing sixth, the championship order had shifted with Baird becoming the new points leader heading into the Grand Prix finale. Radisich finished a distant second with the engine omitting an apparent misfire.

=== Grand Prix ===
Baird's led Ken Smith in the championship by only two points heading into the Grand Prix. Baird had expressed his ambitions to compete in the British Formula Three Championship after the conclusion of the event but without the necessary budget at the time, those plans along with any future prospects in the single-seater category, hinged on the success in the Grand Prix. Thus, Baird regarded the race as, "...probably the most important race of my life". Ken Smith meanwhile was left scrambling to secure a gearbox casing before the race. Arriving back at the circuit just in time for the start.

Off the line, Baird won the holeshot to assume the lead while Mark Smith slotted into second. For the next 12 laps, the American chased down the Selectrix driver. However, on lap 13, the plug lead came adrift and forced him into the pits, putting him down a lap. This freed up Ken Smith, who was in third, to chase after Baird. The battle raged for a few more laps before Smith incurred a throttle cable failure and left him stranded on the side of the road. With this, Baird had become the presumptive champion. The race however, was not yet over.

Behind Baird, Radisich had begun to close the margin. Having whittled the margin down to half a second with five laps to go, Radisich looked set to make a move on Baird. However, upon exiting the hairpin, his engine expired and left Baird free to cruise to the finish where he won the Grand Prix and the New Zealand Formula Pacific Championship. Berg inherited a second place finish while Barrie Thomlinson rounded out the podium. Elsewhere down the field, Steve Richards won the Ralt Cup after finishing in tenth place.

== Results ==
Pos	No.	Driver	Entrant	Vehicle	Laps	Time/Retired	Grid
1	2	(New Zealand) Craig Baird	Selectrix	Swift DB4-Toyota	40		1
2	4	(United States) Mike Berg	Graeme Lawrence Motorsport	Swift DB4-Toyota	40		3
3	91	(New Zealand) Barrie Thomlinson	Uniden	Reynard 89H-Toyota	40		4
4	70	(United States) Sandy Dells	Fosters	Swift DB4-Toyota	39	+ 1 lap	5
5	12	(New Zealand) Barrie Flett	South Auckland Motors	Swift DB4-Toyota	39	+ 1 lap	11
6	1	(United States) Mark Smith	Graeme Lawrence Motorsport	Swift DB4-Toyota	39	+ 1 lap	10
7	8	(New Zealand) Dean Cockerton	Sign Centre	Ralt TRH86-Toyota	39	+ 1 lap	13
8	6	(New Zealand) Ian MacDonald	Ian MacDonald	Ralt RT4-Toyota	39	+ 1 lap	7
9	99	(New Zealand) Bob Donaldson	Bob Donaldson	Ralt RT4-Toyota	38	+ 2 laps	14
10	9	(New Zealand) Steve Richards	Ultra Imagineering	Ralt RT4-Toyota	38	+ 2 laps	8
11	3	(New Zealand) Heather Spurle	Series 500	Ralt Series 500-Toyota	37	+ 3 laps	9
12	17	(New Zealand) Grant Ellwood	Grant Ellwood	Ralt RT4-Toyota	36	+ 4 laps	12
Ret	89	(New Zealand) Paul Radisich	Reynard Motorsport	Reynard 90H-Toyota	37	Engine	2
Ret	11	(New Zealand) Ken Smith	Ken Smith Motorsport	Swift DB4-Ford	17	Throttle cable	6

== Aftermath ==
Following this race, the New Zealand Grand Prix marquee would be moved over to the Manfeild Autocourse until the event entered a hiatus in 1996. The Grand Prix would return to Pukekohe for one final event in 2000 before leaving the venue for good.

Baird would return to the series for the next two seasons, winning the New Zealand Grand Prix in both occasions.

Preceded by 1990 New Zealand Grand Prix	New Zealand Grand Prix; 1991	Succeeded by 1992 New Zealand Grand Prix
