= NZ Touring Cars Championship =

- Category: Touring car racing
- Country: New Zealand
- Inaugural season: 1994
- Constructors: 4 (Holden, Ford, Nissan, Toyota)
- Drivers' champion: Tim Edgell
- Makes' champion: Holden
- Teams' champion: Tim Edgell Racing
- Official website: www.nzv8touringcars.co.nz

The New Zealand Touring Cars Championship (currently known as the Racer Products V8s for commercial reasons) is a New Zealand–based motorsport category of touring car racing. MotorSport New Zealand, New Zealand's national governing and sanctioning body for motorsport, awarded the category "New Zealand Touring Car Championship" title status in 1996. Since being awarded national championship title status, drivers and teams across New Zealand had raced in what was at the time New Zealand's premier motorsport category. In 2020, MotorSport New Zealand withdrew title status, awarding it to the new TCR New Zealand Series.

== History ==
The New Zealand V8s category journeys to various race tracks around New Zealand. This series somewhat resembles but differs in many ways from the Australian V8 Supercars, primarily in terms of the level of technology. The NZ V8 series focuses on cost containment and control to make sure that the series is not dominated by one make or team. It is technically more basic than the Supercars, but also tends to be a bit more spectacular with a lot more close-action racing due to limited grip and braking capabilities. Unlike the Supercars, the NZV8 races are all sprint races so there is no requirement for elaborate pit crew setups. (In previous years a 500 km endurance race was run, but this has been dropped). The vehicles themselves are visually almost indistinguishable from Supercars, and grids are typically 10 to 28 vehicles in size. A number of Australian Supercars drivers now race in the NZV8's such as David Besnard, Luke Youlden and Cameron McLean for example, as the series has come to be recognised as an outstanding class in its own right, rather than a poor cousin of the Australian V8 Supercars. Supercars teams have previously been involved; Team Kiwi Racing has run two-car teams in the series in the past as a development ground.

The winner of the 2005/2006 season was Kayne Scott driving a Holden Commodore, who took the trophy after a controversial season that initially saw Angus Fogg (Ford Falcon) awarded the trophy, only to lose it in the court room. The 05/06 season saw Fords dominating for the first time, and there were loud cries of lack of parity from the Holden teams. It was clear that the Falcons had a considerable edge over the Holdens in power in the low and mid-range, so significant that MSNZ changed the rules and allowed the use of a carb spacer on the Holdens to shift their torque curve. This saw an improvement in the competitiveness of the Holden teams, with Holden driver Kayne Scott dicing for the championship lead. However, Andy Booth was the only other Holden driver consistently in the top-ten, and the Falcons continued to dominate in general. The series was ultimately won in convincing style by Johnny McIntyre in a Ford.

The 07/08 season has seen a dramatic shift towards entries from Ford teams, with Fords outnumbering Holdens by nearly two to one, and many existing Holden-based teams switching to Ford, including former champion Kayne Scott. This is a direct result of the perceived lack of parity over the last two seasons, with the Fords being significantly more competitive. However, any disparity between the two camps is questionable after the first round of the 07/08 season at Pukekohe; John McIntyre (Ford) produced a convincing opening round win, but was dogged all the way by Andy Booth (Holden) who was clearly equal in performance and handling. That said, former champion Paul Manuell was the only other Holden to finish the round in the top 10.

The 07/08 season also sees a reduction to six rounds in the championship. A seventh round is still run in conjunction with the New Zealand round of the Australian V8 Supercars, but due to a conflict in television broadcasting rights it no longer forms part of the NZ competition series, and is instead treated as a separate trophy round. The 07/08 season also sees former V8 Supercar driver and two-times FIA World Touring Car champion Paul Radisich, driving a Ford Falcon in the series.

The 08/09 season was a neck and neck battle between Ford BA Falcon drivers Kayne Scott and John McIntyre, with Scott winning the title by a mere 9 points. Third was versitel driver Craig Baird.

The 09/10 season again was a close battle. This time Craig Baird came out on top from John McIntyre. McIntyre had nightmare meeting at the fourth round at Timaru failing to finish any of the three races. Baird won by 75 points. Third was defending champions Kayne Scott.

The 10/11 season was boiled with controversy. Kayne Scott was stripped of his first six rounds points for technical infringements, as was visiting Australian V8 Supercars driver Jason Bargwanna at Ruapuna. Scott and his team were livid with the ruling which handed the title to John McIntyre with Craig Baird runner up and Andy Booth in third.

== Scoring system ==
Current points scoring system for each race
1st	2nd	3rd	4th	5th	6th	7th	8th	9th	10th	11th	12th	13th	14th	15th	16th	17th	18th	19th	20th	21st	22nd	23rd	24th	25th	26th	27th	28th	29th	30th
75	67	60	54	49	45	42	39	36	33	30	28	26	24	22	20	18	16	14	12	10	9	8	7	6	5	4	3	2	1

== The car ==
- Power: The engine is a controlled 5.0L V8 (R302ci for the Ford Falcon and 304ci for the Holden Commodore). Most parts of the engine are controlled and unlike the Australian Touring Cars (Supercars Championship) which uses fuel injection, the series uses a controlled carburettor. The other control parts for the engine are manifolds, exhausts, cam-shafts, rockers, air-filter/cold air box and ignition. The engines are rev-limited to 6400rpm. Top speed is 240 km/h.
- Gearbox: The gearing of a NZ V8 is also controlled. All teams use a controlled 4 speed gearbox produced by Richmond. The gear set, clutch, flywheel and gearbox are also controlled and made by Richmond.
- Tyres: A controlled Dunlop D14 non tread "slick" and R92 W08 treaded wet weather tyre. The contact patch is very small and therefore there is very little grip. Only six new tyres are given out to teams per round to spice up racing.
- Brakes: Brakes are controlled Wilwood six-piston front and four-piston rear brakes with controlled calipers, rotors and pedal box.
- Aero: A standard aerodynamic package (which is very similar to an Australian V8 Supercar in terms of look) of a rear wing and end plates/mounting pedestals, a front splitter and side skirts are supplied to the teams of each make.
- Suspension: Control Koni shock absorbers. Bars and springs are not controlled.
- Bodyshell: Each car is loosely based on either the Holden VY Commodore or Ford BA Falcon production bodyshells, with an elaborate roll cage constructed into the shell from aircraft grade materials. Other modifications include wider wheel arches and pick up points for the front splitter and rear wing.
- Weight: Minimum weight is 1420 kg with the driver included.
- Cost: Has been said that costs can have been over NZ$100,000 to build a NZ V8 and up to NZ$400,000 to build a car from scratch and running costs.

== Circuits ==
- Pukekohe Park Raceway
- Manfeild Autocourse
- Teretonga Park
- Hampton Downs Motorsport Park
- Highlands Motorsport Park

== Champions ==
Motorsport NZ granted championship status to the V8 class for the 1996–97 season, at which time it was officially known as TraNZam Lights. The class was renamed to NZ V8 Touring Cars for 1998/99, to NZV8s for 2005/06 and to NZV8s at the commencement of the 2007/08 season. It became NZ Touring Cars for the 2015/16 season then for the 2017/18 season was named the BNT V8s due to naming rights. .

Season	Champion	Vehicle
1996–97	(New Zealand) Greg Taylor	Holden VR Commodore
1997–98	(New Zealand) Wayne Huxford	Holden VS Commodore
1998–99	(New Zealand) Paul Pedersen	Holden VS Commodore
1999–00	(New Zealand) Mark Pedersen	Holden VS Commodore
2000–01	(New Zealand) Paul Manuell	Holden VT Commodore
2001–02	(New Zealand) Ashley Stichbury	Ford AU Falcon
2002–03	(New Zealand) Mark Pedersen	Ford AU Falcon
2003–04	(New Zealand) Andy Booth	Holden VX Commodore
2004–05	(New Zealand) Andy Booth	Holden VY Commodore
2005–06	(New Zealand) Kayne Scott	Holden VY Commodore
2006–07	(New Zealand) John McIntyre	Ford BA Falcon
2007–08	(New Zealand) John McIntyre	Ford BA Falcon
2008–09	(New Zealand) Kayne Scott	Ford BF Falcon
2009–10	(New Zealand) Craig Baird	Ford BF Falcon
2010–11	(New Zealand) John McIntyre	Ford BF Falcon
2011–12	(New Zealand) Angus Fogg	Ford BF Falcon
2013	TLX: (Australia) Jason Bargwanna	Holden VE Commodore
2013	TL: (New Zealand) AJ Lauder	Ford BF Falcon
2013–14	TLX: (New Zealand) Nick Ross	Holden VE Commodore
2013–14	TL: (New Zealand) James McLaughlin	Holden VY Commodore
2014–15	TLX: (Australia) Jason Bargwanna	Toyota Camry
2014–15	TL: (New Zealand) Kevin Williams	Holden VY Commodore
2015–16	Class One: (New Zealand) Simon Evans	Holden VE Commodore
2015–16	Class Two: (New Zealand) Brock Cooley	Ford BF Falcon
2016–17	Class One: (New Zealand) Simon Evans	Holden VE Commodore
2016–17	Class Two: (New Zealand) Liam MacDonald	Ford BF Falcon
2017-18	Class One: (New Zealand) Andre Heimgartner	Toyota Camry
2017-18	Class Two: (New Zealand) Liam MacDonald	Ford BF Falcon
2018-19	Class One: (Australia) Jack Smith	Holden VE Commodore
2018-19	Class Two: (New Zealand) Justin Ashwell	Ford BF Falcon

=== Multiple Championships ===
==== Class One ====
Wins	Driver	Years
3	(New Zealand) John McIntyre	2006-07, 2007-08, 2010-11
2	(New Zealand) Mark Pedersen	1999-00, 2002-03
2	(New Zealand) Andy Booth	2003-04, 2004-05
2	(New Zealand) Kayne Scott	2005-06, 2008-09
2	(Australia) Jason Bargwanna	2013, 2014-15
2	(New Zealand) Simon Evans	2015-16, 2016-17

==== Class Two ====
Wins	Driver	Years
2	(New Zealand) Liam MacDonald	2016-17, 2017-18

== See also ==
- New Zealand Touring Car Championship
