= Jason Bargwanna =

Australian motor racing driver

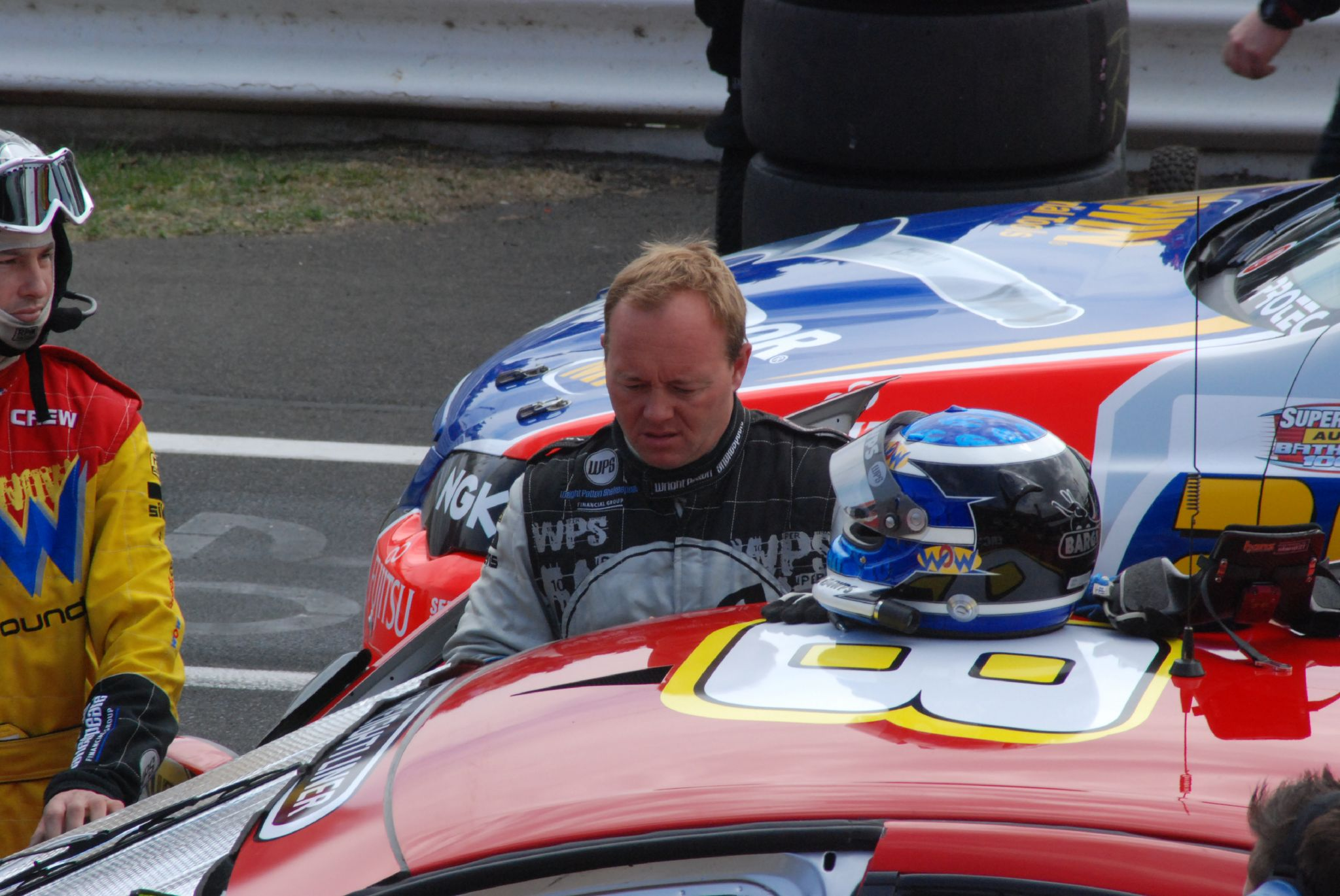
- Bargwanna at the 2007 Bathurst 1000
- Nationality: (Australia) Australian
- Born: Jason Eric Bargwanna; 26 April 1971 (age 55) Sydney, New South Wales
- Relatives: Harry Bargwanna (father); Ben Bargwanna (son); Alf Bargwanna (uncle); Scott Bargwanna (cousin); Jude Bargwanna (second cousin)

Supercars Championship career
- Championships: 0
- Races: 377
- Wins: 7
- Podiums: 23
- Pole positions: 2

Jason Eric Bargwanna (born 26 April 1971) is an Australian motor racing driver. Best known as a Supercars Championship competitor, Bargwanna raced in the series for 25 years, the pinnacle of which was winning, with Garth Tander, the 2000 Bathurst 1000 in a Garry Rogers Motorsport prepared Holden Commodore. Bargwanna was the Driving Standards Observer for the Supercars Championship from 2014 until 2016.

== Career history ==
Bargwanna commenced his racing career in the late 1980s, initially competing in the Formula Vee category. He made his Bathurst 1000 début while still a teenager in 1990 and won the 1992 Bathurst 1600 cc class at 20, with his cousin Scott, however a lack of funding limited his motor sport participation for the next few seasons and he pursued a career in the financial sector.

Bargwanna's career finally started to move forward in 1995, racing in the Australian Formula Ford Championship. He impressed in his seven-year-old Reynard, racing against younger drivers with the latest cars from Van Diemen and Swift and against drivers of the calibre of Jason Bright and Mark Webber. His 1995 showing allowed him to attract the budget to run a campaign with late model equipment in 1996 and he finished second in the championship to Van Diemen's factory supported driver, David Besnard. He also represented Australia in the EFDA Nations Cup in both 1995 and 1996. A move to Formula Holden resulted in second place in the 1997 Australian Drivers' Championship with SH Racing.

=== V8 Supercars ===
As a member of the Holden Young Lions V8 Supercar program in 1997, Bargwanna surprised many by taking provisional pole position in the #97 Holden Commodore at the Bathurst 1000 Classic only to damage the car beyond repair in a race day warm up accident. His career further advanced in 1998 with a move full-time to Garry Rogers Motorsport, where he stayed for five years. Bargwanna is best known for winning the 2000 Bathurst 1000 with Garth Tander for that team. He also scored two round wins at the Winton event in 1999 and 2000 and at the inaugural championship round supporting the Gold Coast Indy 300, the V8 Supercar Challenge, in 2002.

In 2003, Bargwanna switched to Ford and drove for Larkham Motor Sport from 2003 to 2005. In 2006, Larkham Motor Sport merged with WPS Racing, the team folding immediately prior to the 2008 season and leaving Bargwanna without a full-time drive. He did however co-drive a Holden Commodore (VE) for Rod Nash Racing alongside Tony D'Alberto in the 2008 Phillip Island 500 and the Bathurst 1000 endurance races.

Bargwanna joined Tasman Motorsport for 2009 and, following the closure of that team at the end of the season, he joined Kelly Racing for 2010. He was also voted in the top 50 all time Australian Touring car drivers in 2010. In 2011 Bargwanna drove a Brad Jones Racing Commodore alongside his junior open-wheel rival, Jason Bright.

In 2014, Bargwanna was appointed as the Driver Standards Observer for the Supercars Championship. Bargwanna left the post at the end of 2016.

=== New Zealand V8 ===
In late 2011, Bargwanna left the V8 Supercars Australia and joined the New Zealand V8. He resulted runner-up in the 2011/12 season behind Angus Fogg, collecting a round win and podiums in the six rounds driving a Tulloch Ford Falcon. The team switched to a Holden Commodore for the 2013 season. The driver won nine out of 15 races and got the TLX title.

=== TCR ===
In 2020, Bargwanna was to make his debut in the TCR Australia and TCR Asia Pacific Cup driving a Peugeot 308. Both series were cancelled due to the COVID-19 pandemic. In 2021, he and his son Ben, debuted in the series. Jason scored his first win at Phillip Island

== Personal life ==
Bargwanna is married to Debra and has two children. He lives in Nar Nar Goon, Victoria. His father, Harry Bargwanna, himself an Australian racing driver, owns and operates a mechanical repair shop in the Southern Sydney suburb of Engadine. His uncle Alf and cousin Scott are also national level race drivers. Bargwanna attended Heathcote High School in Sydney. Bargwanna owns one Red Rooster franchises in Pakenham West.

== Career results ==
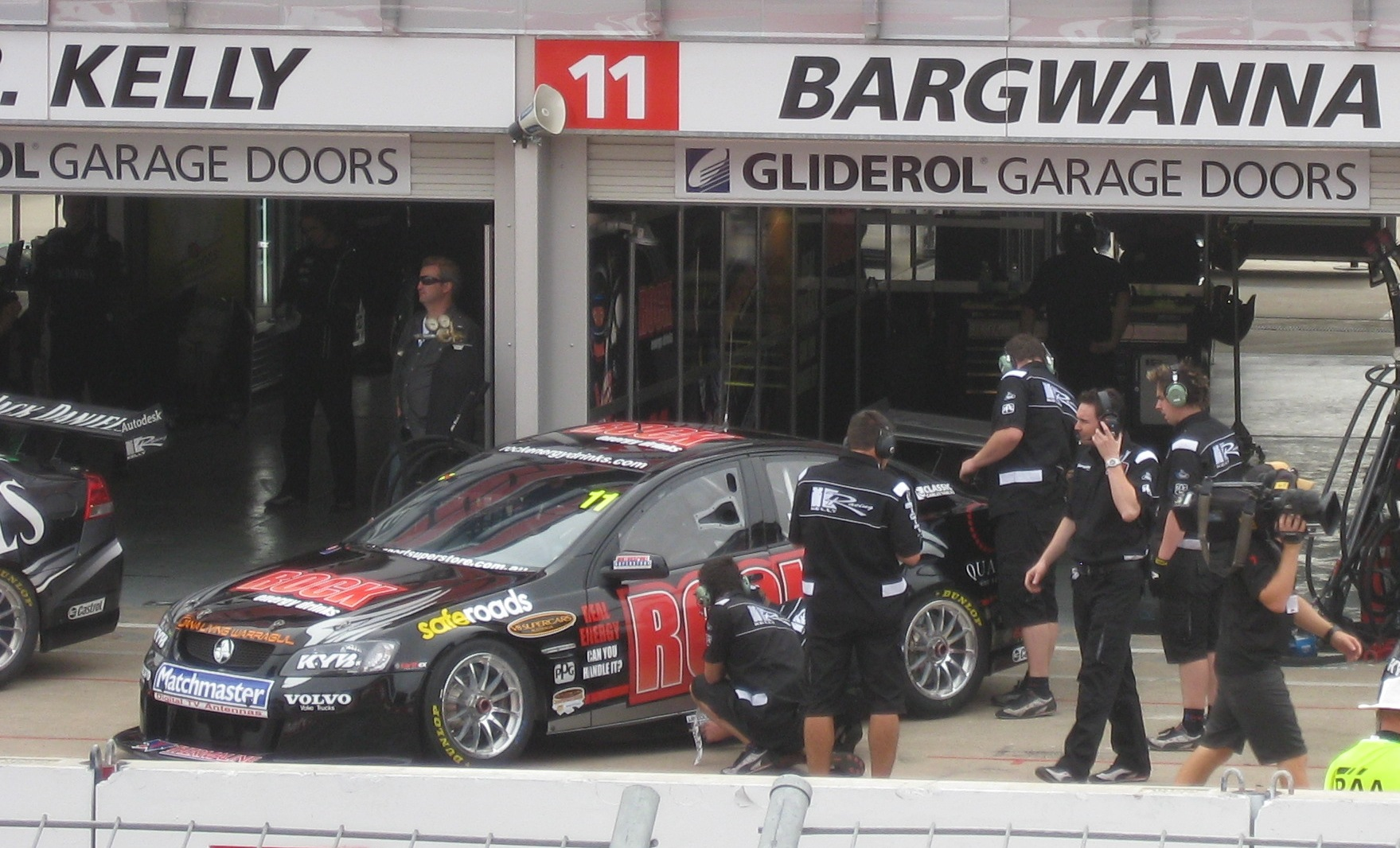
Bargwanna drove a Holden Commodore (VE) for Kelly Racing in the 2010 V8 Supercar Championship Series.

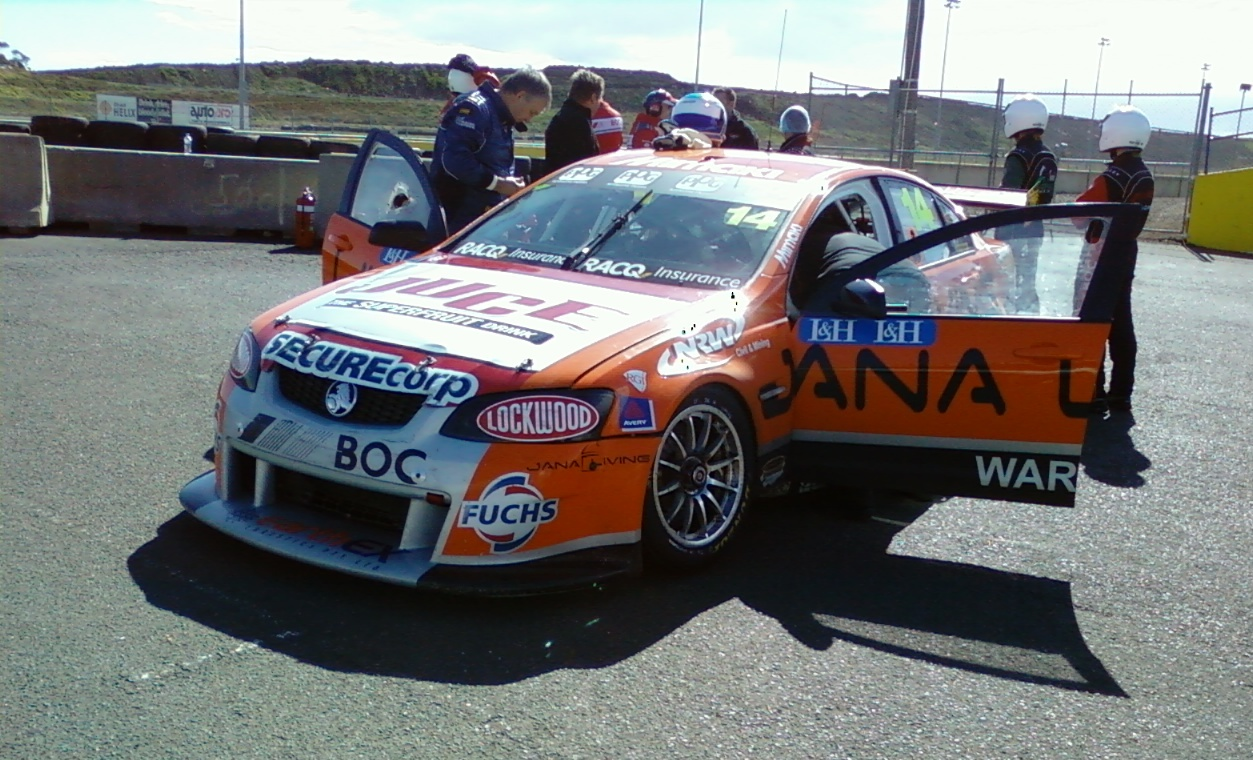
Bargwanna is driving a Holden Commodore (VE) for Brad Jones Racing in the 2011 V8 Supercars Championship.

Season	Series	Position	Car	Team
1994	Australian Formula Ford Championship	18th	Reynard FF88 Ford	Ugly Kid Racing
1995	Australian Formula Ford Championship	9th	Reynard FF88 Ford	Ugly Kid Racing
1995	EFDA Nations Cup	11th †	Van Diemen – Opel	Team Australia
1996	Australian Formula Ford Championship	**2nd**	Spectrum 05c Ford	Team Arrow
1996	EFDA Nations Cup	8th †	Van Diemen – Opel	Team Australia
1997	Australian Drivers' Championship	**2nd**	Reynard 92D Holden	SH Racing
1998	Australian Touring Car Championship	7th	Holden Commodore (VS)	Garry Rogers Motorsport
1999	Shell Championship Series	11th	Holden Commodore (VT)	Garry Rogers Motorsport
2000	Shell Championship Series	7th	Holden Commodore (VT)	Garry Rogers Motorsport
2001	Shell Championship Series	15th	Holden Commodore (VX)	Garry Rogers Motorsport
2002	V8 Supercar Championship Series	13th	Holden Commodore (VX)	Garry Rogers Motorsport
2003	V8 Supercar Championship Series	14th	Ford Falcon (AU); Ford Falcon (BA)	Larkham Motor Sport
2004	V8 Supercar Championship Series	8th	Ford Falcon (BA)	Larkham Motor Sport
2005	V8 Supercar Championship Series	26th	Ford Falcon (BA)	Larkham Motor Sport
2006	V8 Supercar Championship Series	14th	Ford Falcon (BA)	WPS Racing
2007	V8 Supercar Championship Series	18th	Ford Falcon (BF)	WPS Racing
2008	Australian Mini Challenge	4th	Mini Cooper	Bargwanna Motorsport
2008	V8 Supercar Championship Series	61st	Holden Commodore (VE)	Tony D'Alberto Racing
2009	V8 Supercar Championship Series	25th	Holden Commodore (VE)	Tasman Motorsport
2010	V8 Supercar Championship Series	24th	Holden Commodore (VE)	Kelly Racing
2010-11	New Zealand V8 Touring Cars	11th	Ford Falcon (BA)	Tulloch Motorsport
2011	International V8 Supercars Championship	22nd	Holden Commodore (VE)	Brad Jones Racing
2011-12	New Zealand V8 Touring Cars	**2nd**	Ford Falcon (BA)	Tulloch Motorsport
2013	New Zealand V8 Touring Cars - TLX Class	**1st**	Holden Commodore (VE)	Tulloch Motorsport
2013–14	New Zealand V8 Touring Cars - TLX Class	**2nd**	Toyota Camry	Richards Team Motorsport
2014–15	New Zealand V8 Touring Cars - TLX Class	**1st**	Toyota Camry	Richards Team Motorsport
2015–16	New Zealand Touring Cars - Class one	4th	Toyota Camry	Richards Team Motorsport
2016–17	New Zealand Touring Cars - Class one	**3rd**	Ford Falcon (FG); Toyota Camry	Richards Team Motorsport
2017–18	New Zealand Touring Cars - Class one	**2nd**	Toyota Camry	Richards Team Motorsport
2020	TCR Asia Pacific Cup	NC	Peugeot 308 TCR	Burson Auto Parts Racing
2021	TCR Australia	9th	Peugeot 308 TCR	Burson Auto Parts Racing
2021	Trans Am Series	29th	Ford Mustang	Garry Rogers Motorsport

† team result

=== Supercars Championship results ===
(Races in bold indicate pole position) (Races in italics indicate fastest lap)

Supercars results
Year	Team	Car	1	2	3	4	5	6	7	8	9	10	11	12	13	14	15	16	17	18	19	20	21	22	23	24	25	26	27	28	29	30	31	32	33	34	35	36	37	38	Position	Points
1998	Garry Rogers Motorsport	Holden VS Commodore	SAN; R1; 6	SAN; R2; Ret	SAN; R3; DNS	SYM; R4; 5	SYM; R5; 4	SYM; R6; 3	LAK; R7; 10	LAK; R8; 23	LAK; R9; 13	PHI; R10; 8	PHI; R11; 8	PHI; R12; 11	WIN; R13; 7	WIN; R14; Ret	WIN; R15; 11	MAL; R16; 20	MAL; R17; 9	MAL; R18; 6	BAR; R19; 27	BAR; R20; Ret	BAR; R21; 6	CAL; R22; 4	CAL; R23; 1	**CAL**; **R24**; **C**	HDV; R25; 8	HDV; R26; 2	HDV; R27; 2	ORA; R28; 10	ORA; R29; 3	ORA; R30; 3									7th	603
1999	Garry Rogers Motorsport	Holden VT Commodore	EAS; R1; 8	EAS; R2; 5	EAS; R3; 15	ADE; R4; 8	BAR; R5; 9	BAR; R6; 24	BAR; R7; 16	PHI; R8; Ret	PHI; R9; DNS	PHI; R10; DNS	HDV; R11; 8	HDV; R12; 8	HDV; R13; 4	SAN; R14; 10	SAN; R15; 17	SAN; R16; Ret	QLD; R17; 7	QLD; R18; 26	QLD; R19; 6	CAL; R20; Ret	CAL; R21; 15	CAL; R22; 10	SYM; R23; 4	SYM; R24; 2	SYM; R25; 3	WIN; R26; 1	WIN; R27; 1	WIN; R28; 1	ORA; R29; 28	ORA; R30; 9	ORA; R31; Ret	QLD; R32; 2	BAT; R33; Ret						11th	1148
2000	Garry Rogers Motorsport	Holden VT Commodore	PHI; R1; 31	PHI; R2; 21	BAR; R3; 5	BAR; R4; 7	BAR; R5; 28	ADE; R6; 7	ADE; R7; 3	EAS; R8; Ret	EAS; R9; 14	EAS; R10; 21	HDV; R11; Ret	HDV; R12; 15	HDV; R13; Ret	CAN; R14; 2	CAN; R15; 13	CAN; R16; Ret	QLD; R17; 12	QLD; R18; 7	QLD; R19; 19	WIN; R20; 6	WIN; R21; 3	WIN; R22; 1	ORA; R23; 19	ORA; R24; 7	ORA; R25; 4	CAL; R26; 13	CAL; R27; 11	CAL; R28; 11	QLD; R29; 2	SAN; R30; 10	SAN; R31; 17	SAN; R32; 14	BAT; R33; 1						7th	1054
2001	Garry Rogers Motorsport	Holden VX Commodore	PHI; R1; 18	PHI; R2; 13	ADE; R3; 9	ADE; R4; 14	EAS; R5; Ret	EAS; R6; 17	HDV; R7; 13	HDV; R8; 7	HDV; R9; 13	CAN; R10; 9	CAN; R11; 3	CAN; R12; Ret	BAR; R13; 11	BAR; R14; Ret	BAR; R15; 12	CAL; R16; 12	CAL; R17; 29	CAL; R18; 17	ORA; R19; 9	ORA; R20; Ret	QLD; R21; 15	WIN; R22; 7	WIN; R23; 18	BAT; R24; 6	PUK; R25; 10	PUK; R26; 12	PUK; R27; 15	SAN; R28; 9	SAN; R29; 7	SAN; R30; 12									15th	1821
2002	Garry Rogers Motorsport	Holden VX Commodore	ADE; R1; 10	ADE; R2; 9	PHI; R3; Ret	PHI; R4; DNS	EAS; R5; 24	EAS; R6; 26	EAS; R7; 13	HDV; R8; 13	HDV; R9; 8	HDV; R10; 13	CAN; R11; 27	CAN; R12; 8	CAN; R13; 17	BAR; R14; 18	BAR; R15; 13	BAR; R16; 8	ORA; R17; Ret	ORA; R18; 28	WIN; R19; 22	WIN; R20; 12	QLD; R21; 3	BAT; R22; Ret	SUR; R23; 5	SUR; R24; 1	PUK; R25; 19	PUK; R26; 19	PUK; R27; 12	SAN; R28; 20	SAN; R29; 11										13th	765
2003	Larkham Motorsport	Ford AU Falcon	ADE; R1; 15	ADE; R1; 19	PHI; R3; 26	EAS; R4; 14	WIN; R5; 13	BAR; R6; Ret	BAR; R7; Ret	BAR; R8; DNS	HDV; R9; 17	HDV; R10; 13	HDV; R11; 20	QLD; R12; 17	ORA; R13; 15	SAN; R14; 9	BAT; R15; Ret	SUR; R16; 17	SUR; R17; 13	PUK; R18; 4	PUK; R19; 5	PUK; R20; 13	EAS; R21; 9	EAS; R22; 6																	14th	1431
2004	Larkham Motorsport	Ford BA Falcon	ADE; R1; 21	ADE; R2; 5	EAS; R3; 8	PUK; R4; 27	PUK; R5; Ret	PUK; R6; 21	HDV; R7; 7	HDV; R8; 7	HDV; R9; 19	BAR; R10; 18	BAR; R11; Ret	BAR; R12; 19	QLD; R13; 25	WIN; R14; 15	ORA; R15; 6	ORA; R16; 14	SAN; R17; 6	BAT; R18; 5	SUR; R19; 5	SUR; R20; 3	SYM; R21; 22	SYM; R22; 11	SYM; R23; 21	EAS; R24; 10	EAS; R25; 11	EAS; R26; 16													8th	1526
2005	Larkham Motorsport	Ford BA Falcon	ADE; R1; Ret	ADE; R2; Ret	PUK; R3; Ret	PUK; R4; 14	PUK; R5; Ret	BAR; R6; 9	BAR; R7; 10	BAR; R8; 12	EAS; R9; 17	EAS; R10; 21	SHA; R11; 21	SHA; R12; Ret	SHA; R13; 13	HDV; R14; Ret	HDV; R15; 24	HDV; R16; 19	QLD; R17; 19	ORA; R18; 11	ORA; R19; 12	SAN; R20; 16	BAT; R21; Ret	SUR; R22; Ret	SUR; R23; 19	SUR; R24; Ret	SYM; R25; 19	SYM; R26; 30	SYM; R27; 28	PHI; R28; 16	PHI; R29; 17	PHI; R30; 17									26th	883
2006	WPS Racing	Ford BA Falcon	ADE; R1; Ret	ADE; R2; 11	PUK; R3; 11	PUK; R4; Ret	PUK; R5; 13	BAR; R6; 15	BAR; R7; 16	BAR; R8; 20	WIN; R9; 24	WIN; R10; Ret	WIN; R11; 17	HDV; R12; 21	HDV; R13; 11	HDV; R14; 10	QLD; R15; Ret	QLD; R16; 12	QLD; R17; 21	ORA; R18; 15	ORA; R19; 9	ORA; R20; 14	SAN; R21; 7	BAT; R22; 10	SUR; R23; 9	SUR; R24; 9	SUR; R25; 11	SYM; R26; 18	SYM; R27; 8	SYM; R28; 21	BHR; R29; 22	BHR; R30; 16	BHR; R31; 22	PHI; R32; 21	PHI; R33; 19	PHI; R34; 26					14th	2053
2007	WPS Racing	Ford BF Falcon	ADE; R1; 15	ADE; R2; Ret	BAR; R3; 25	BAR; R4; 22	BAR; R5; 23	PUK; R6; 20	PUK; R7; Ret	PUK; R8; DNS	WIN; R9; 11	WIN; R10; 22	WIN; R11; 15	EAS; R12; 15	EAS; R13; 15	EAS; R14; 13	HDV; R15; Ret	HDV; R16; 16	HDV; R17; 13	QLD; R18; 14	QLD; R19; Ret	QLD; R20; 21	ORA; R21; 15	ORA; R22; 27	ORA; R23; 13	SAN; R24; Ret	BAT; R25; 7	SUR; R26; 14	SUR; R27; 7	SUR; R28; 12	BHR; R29; 9	BHR; R30; 10	BHR; R31; 11	SYM; R32; 23	SYM; R33; 23	SYM; R34; Ret	PHI; R35; 23	PHI; R36; 18	PHI; R37; 16		18th	109
2008	Tony D'Alberto Racing	Holden VE Commodore	ADE; R1	ADE; R2	EAS; R3	EAS; R4	EAS; R5	HAM; R6	HAM; R7	HAM; R8	BAR; R9	BAR; R10	BAR; R11	SAN; R12; PO	SAN; R13; PO	SAN; R14; PO	HDV; R15	HDV; R16	HDV; R17	QLD; R18; PO	QLD; R19; PO	QLD; R20; PO	WIN; R21; PO	WIN; R22; PO	WIN; R23; PO	PHI; Q 22	PHI; R24; Ret	BAT; R25; Ret	SUR; R26	SUR; R27	SUR; R28	BHR; R29	BHR; R30	BHR; R31	SYM; R32	SYM; R33	SYM; R34	ORA; R35	ORA; R36	ORA; R37	61st	38
2009	Tasman Motorsport	Holden VE Commodore	ADE; R1; Ret	ADE; R2; 20	HAM; R3; Ret	HAM; R4; Ret	WIN; R5; 26	WIN; R6; 10	SYM; R7; 19	SYM; R8; 8	HDV; R9; 22	HDV; R10; Ret	TOW; R11; 14	TOW; R12; Ret	SAN; R13; 20	SAN; R14; 9	QLD; R15; 18	QLD; R16; 25	PHI; Q 18	PHI; R17; Ret	BAT; R18; 16	SUR; R19; 11	SUR; R20; 10	**SUR**; **R21**; **9**	SUR; R22; Ret	PHI; R23; 23	PHI; R24; 19	BAR; R25; 18	BAR; R26; 7	SYD; R27; 7	SYD; R28; Ret										25th	1192
2010	Kelly Racing	Holden VE Commodore	YMC; R1; 13	YMC; R2; 15	BHR; R3; 15	BHR; R4; 14	ADE; R5; Ret	ADE; R6; 24	HAM; R7; 15	HAM; R8; 9	QLD; R9; 19	QLD; R10; Ret	WIN; R11; 23	WIN; R12; Ret	HDV; R13; 19	HDV; R14; 21	TOW; R15; 22	TOW; R16; 10	PHI; R17; 20	BAT; R18; Ret	SUR; R19; 11	SUR; R20; 20	SYM; R21; Ret	SYM; R22; 17	SAN; R23; 17	SAN; R24; 20	SYD; R25; 9	SYD; R26; 22													24th	1208
2011	Brad Jones Racing	Holden VE Commodore	YMC; R1; 19	YMC; R2; 12	ADE; R3; 10	ADE; R4; Ret	HAM; R5; 13	HAM; R6; Ret	BAR; R7; 11	BAR; R8; 3	BAR; R9; 9	WIN; R10; Ret	WIN; R11; 14	HID; R12; 8	HID; R13; 10	TOW; R14; 23	TOW; R15; 11	QLD; R16; 22	QLD; R17; 13	QLD; R18; 17	PHI; R19; 11	BAT; R20; 23	SUR; R21; 17	SUR; R22; 17	SYM; R23; 18	SYM; R24; 25	SAN; R25; Ret	SAN; R26; 14	SYD; R27; Ret	SYD; R28; 17											22nd	1352

=== Complete Bathurst 1000 results ===
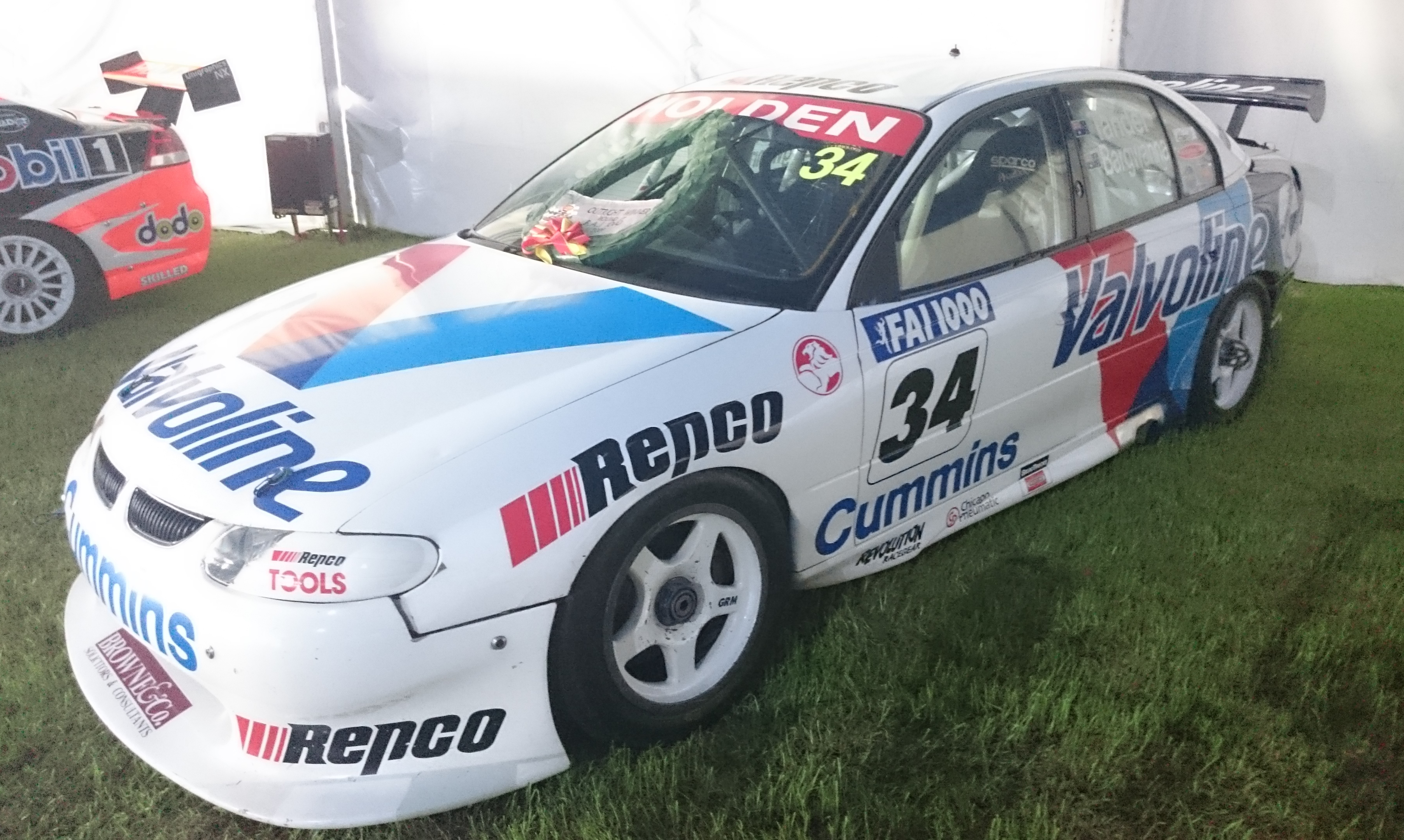
The Holden Commodore (VT) in which Bargwanna and Garth Tander won the 2000 FAI 1000 at Bathurst. The car is pictured in 2018.

Year	Car#	Team	Car	Co-driver	Overall position	Class position	Laps
1990	43	Brian Callaghan	Holden Commodore (VL)	(Australia) Brian Callaghan, Jr. (Australia) John Gerwald	21st	19th	143
1992	71	Toyota Team Australia	Toyota Corolla FX-GT	(Australia) Scott Bargwanna	22nd	**1st**	126
1997	97	Holden Young Lions	Holden Commodore (VS)	(Australia) Mark Noske	DNS	DNS	0
1998	35	Garry Rogers Motorsport	Holden VS Commodore	(New Zealand) Jim Richards	**3rd**	**3rd**	161
1999	34	Garry Rogers Motorsport	Holden Commodore (VT)	(Australia) Garth Tander	DNF	DNF	41
2000	34	Garry Rogers Motorsport	Holden VT Commodore	(Australia) Garth Tander	**1st**	**1st**	161
2001	34	Garry Rogers Motorsport	Holden Commodore (VX)	(Australia) Garth Tander	6th	6th	161
2002	34	Garry Rogers Motorsport	Holden VX Commodore	(Australia) Garth Tander	DNF	DNF	51
2003	10	Larkham Motor Sport	Ford Falcon (BA)	(Australia) Mark Larkham	DNF	DNF	118
2004	10	Larkham Motor Sport	Ford BA Falcon	(Australia) Mark Winterbottom	5th	5th	161
2005	20	Larkham Motor Sport	Ford BA Falcon	(Australia) Mark Winterbottom	DNF	DNF	122
2006	10	WPS Racing	Ford BA Falcon	(New Zealand) Craig Baird	10th	10th	161
2007	8	WPS Racing	Ford Falcon (BF)	(Brazil) Max Wilson	7th	7th	161
2008	55	Rod Nash Racing	Holden Commodore (VE)	(Australia) Tony D'Alberto	DNF	DNF	159
2009	3	Tasman Motorsport	Holden VE Commodore	(Australia) Mark Noske	6th	6th	161
2010	11	Kelly Racing	Holden VE Commodore	(Australia) Glenn Seton	DNF	DNF	132
2011	14	Brad Jones Racing	Holden VE Commodore	(Australia) Shane Price	23rd	23rd	158

=== Complete Bathurst 12 Hour results ===
Year	Team	Co-drivers	Car	Class	Laps	Pos.	Class pos.
1993	(Australia) Fowler Bathroom Products	(Australia) Stephen Shedden (Australia) Scott Bargwanna	Toyota MR2	S	228	DNF	DNF
1994	(Australia) Mercantile Mutual Dealer Team	(Australia) John Smith (Australia) Scott Bargwanna	Toyota MR2	S	248	5th	**2nd**
2009	(Australia) Pro-Duct Motorsport	(Australia) Steve Knight (Australia) Brad Jones	Mitsubishi Lancer RS Evo X	C	238	**3rd**	**3rd**
2010	(Australia) Pro-Duct Motorsport	(Australia) Bob Pearson (Australia) Steve Glenney	Mitsubishi Lancer RS Evo X	A	83	DNF	DNF

=== TCR Australia results ===
(Races in bold indicate pole position) (Races in italics indicate fastest lap)

TCR Australia results
Year	Team	Car	1	2	3	4	5	6	7	8	9	10	11	12	13	14	15	Points	Position
2021	Burson Auto Parts Racing	Peugeot 308 TCR	SYM; R1; 11	SYM; R2; 8	SYM; R3; Ret	PHI; R4; 7	PHI; R5; 5	PHI; R6; 1	BAT; R7; 11	BAT; R8; 9	BAT; R9; 8	SMP; R10; DSQ	SMP; R11; 14	SMP; R12; Ret	BAT; R19; 9	BAT; R20; 3	BAT; R21; 5	342	9th

Sporting positions
Preceded by Steven Richards; Greg Murphy	Winner of the Bathurst 1000; 2000 (with Garth Tander)	Succeeded by Mark Skaife; Tony Longhurst
