= 2007 Australian Carrera Cup Championship =

Australian motor racing competition

Seasons
- ← 2006 2008 →

The 2007 Australian Carrera Cup Championship was a CAMS sanctioned national motor racing championship open to Porsche 911 GT3 Cup Cars (Type 997). It was administered by CupCar Australia Pty Ltd and promoted as the 2007 Carrera Cup Australia, and is recognised by CAMS as the fifth Australian Carrera Cup Championship.

== Calendar ==
The championship was contested over an eight-round series with three races per round.

- Round 1, Adelaide Parklands, South Australia, 4 March
- Round 2, Winton Motor Raceway, Victoria, 20 May
- Round 3, Hidden Valley Raceway, Northern Territory, 24 June
- Round 4, Queensland Raceway, Queensland, 22 July
- Round 5, Oran Park Raceway, New South Wales, 19 August
- Round 6, Sandown Raceway, Victoria, 16 September
- Round 7, Mount Panorama Circuit, New South Wales, 7 October
- Round 8, Surfers Paradise Street Circuit, Queensland, 21 October

== Points system ==
Championship points were awarded on a 60-54-48-42-36-30-27-24-21-18-15-12-9-6-6-3-3-3-3-3 basis for the first twenty places in each race with one point awarded for places 21st through to last.

== Results ==
Position	Driver	No.	Entrant	ADE R1	WIN R2	HID R3	QLD R4	ORA R5	SAN R6	BAT R7	SUR R8	Total
1	David Reynolds	3	Bob Jane T-Marts	144	132	180	162	108	162	144	138	1170
2	Alex Davison	2	OAMPS Insurance Brokers	168	168	150	138	28	162	174	150	1138
3	Craig Baird	1	VIP Petfoods	174	108	156	180	63	156	150	120	1107
4	Marcus Marshall	33	Acer / Leading Solutions	27	162	114	132	96	54	120	174	879
5	Dean Fiore	15	Landscape Developments	126	37	120	69	135	36	30	102	655
6	Bryce Washington	21	ADRAD Racing	66	84	81	36	42	102	120	90	621
7	David Wall	38	World of Learning	57	105	81	96	54	57	102	27	579
8	David Russell	6	Boom Logistics	102	90	18	102	68	54	39	60	533
9	Aaron Caratti	23	Parklands on Bertram	93	87	51	78	30	60	75	45	519
10	Michael Trimble	22	Global Jet	48	69	21	42	102	120	36	3	441
11	Rodney Jane	7	Bob Jane T-Marts	27	57	72	21	49.5	Ret	66	36	328.5
12	Klark Quinn	28	VIP Petfoods	60	33	12	39	54	24	51	18	291
13	Rodney Forbes	8	Jaimie Vedda Clothing Co.		9	60	30	40.5	48	36	42	265.5
14	Paul Stokell	27	Sherrin Equipment				39	75	42	6	75	237
15	James Koundouris	69	Supabarn Supermarkets	12	15	24	15	24	57	21	54	222
16	Steven Ellery	19	Sherrin Motorsport	84	45	36	15					180
17	Tony Quinn	29	VIP Petfoods	15	15	33	4	9	36	48	12	172
18	Peter Hill	66	Boost / Globe	6	18	12	18	15	24	9	27	129
19	Max Twigg	18	Tru Loc Flooring	9	9	3	10	24	27	12	27	121
20	Theo Koundouris	96	Skilled	18	10	9	21	7.5	12	7	12	96.5
21	Shaun Juniper	11	Juniper Racing	9	5	7	9	9	9	6	21	75
22	Marc Cini	12	Hallmarc	7	9	12	5	5.5	9	7	9	63.5
23	Ash Samadhi	55	Apartment Hotel / Roock	9	6	12	9	7.5	10			53.5
24	Grant Sherrin	19	Sherrin Equipment					7.5	7	9	6	29.5
25	Gary Deane	91	Custodian Wealth Builders							4	6	10

Colour	Result
Gold	Winner
Silver	Second place
Bronze	Third place
Green	Points classification
Blue	Non-points classification
Blue	Non-classified finish (NC)
Purple	Retired, not classified (Ret)
Red	Did not qualify (DNQ)
Red	Did not pre-qualify (DNPQ)
Black	Disqualified (DSQ)
White	Did not start (DNS)
White	Withdrew (WD)
White	Race cancelled (C)
Blank	Did not practice (DNP)
Blank	Did not arrive (DNA)
Blank	Excluded (EX)

Race 1 of Round 5 at Oran Park was called early (after 10 of the scheduled 16 laps) due to TV commitments and as a result only half points were awarded.
