= Craig Baird =

New Zealand racing driver (born 1970)

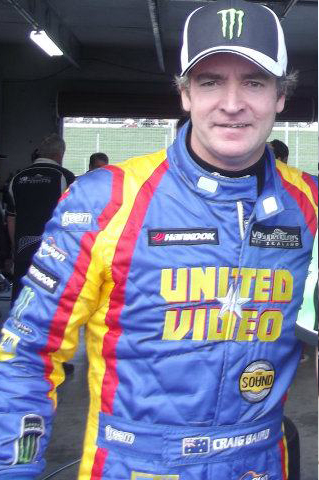
- Baird at Hampton Downs in 2012
- Nationality: (New Zealand) New Zealander
- Born: Craig George Baird; 22 July 1970 (age 56) Hamilton, New Zealand
- Categorisation: FIA Gold (until 2021); FIA Silver (2022–)

Supercars Championship career
- Races: 172
- Wins: 1
- Podiums: 1
- Pole positions: 1
- 2016 position: 50th (219 points)

Craig George Baird MNZM (born 22 July 1970) is a New Zealand former racing driver who now is the driving standards observer for the Supercars Championship. He had previously raced competitively in the series from 2000 to 2016.

Baird enjoyed a prosperous career in his homeland of New Zealand and throughout the world, and is regarded as one of the countries most successful drivers. He won his first title in 1988 with the New Zealand Formula Ford Championship before moving to the Formula Pacific category the next season. Three years later, he would claim his first championship crown in the category and would win the next two seasons that followed. Throughout these three years, he also won the New Zealand Grand Prix, and shares the record for the most wins for the titular race by a single driver. Baird would then compete in the New Zealand Touring Car Championship where he won four consecutive titles from 1994 to 1997.

In 2000, Baird would sign with Stone Brothers Racing to compete in the V8 Supercars Championship Series. After immediate success in the opening round at Phillip Island, Baird struggled to retain a seat in the category. Driving with various teams for the next few years, he eventually stepped out of the category full-time in 2005. From there, he began competing in Porsche championships in Australia and New Zealand. Throughout his tenure, Baird established himself as one of the most successful drivers in the category with a five Australian Carrera Cup Championship titles and six New Zealand Porsche GT3 Championship titles. These achievements led to him being recognised by Porsche Germany as the most successful Porsche Cup driver in the world.

Following on from his racing career, Baird now assumes the role of driving standards observer for the Supercars Championship and was appointed to the Motorsport New Zealand board.

== Junior and early racing career ==
=== Karting ===
Baird started racing karts in 1974 at the age of four. He achieved considerable success with four New Zealand titles and was a two-time Asia-Pacific champion.

=== Junior formula ===
Baird began his foray into racing cars in 1985 in the New Zealand Formula Ford Championship. After two years of moderate success, he finally broke through for his first championship title in the 1987-88 season. The next season, Baird graduated to the New Zealand Formula Pacific Championship. After recording respectable results in his first full season, he competed on a part-time schedule for the next season where he recorded three wins from four appearances. The following year, he captured the title as well as the Motorsport New Zealand ‘Gold Star’ and won the New Zealand Grand Prix, driving a Swift DB4-Toyota. In 1992 and 1993, he dominated the championship, again attaining the New Zealand 'Gold Star' and would win the New Zealand Grand Prix twice more, thereby placing him equal-first for the most New Zealand Grand Prix victories by a single driver.

During the course of 1992, Baird also partook in a campaign in the British Formula Two Championship driving with Graham Lorrimer Motorsport. This proved to be less fruitful than his New Zealand exploits; finishing tenth overall and only nine points to his credit. In America, Baird made select appearances in the Formula Atlantic series in 1990 and 1993. However, his efforts were plagued by mechanical problems. He would also compete in the World Cup Formula 3000 in Buenos Aires. He retired from the event after 40 laps.

== Touring car career ==
In 1994, Baird would step out of single seaters and begin his pursuit in the touring car category. First competing in the New Zealand Touring Car Championship driving for BMW Motorsport New Zealand. This yielded immediate success with Baird winning the championship in his debut season. He would retain his title for the next three seasons. In this time, he also competed in the 1996 South African Touring Car Championship with the BMW works team. He achieved three podiums and finished eighth overall for the season. In 1997, Baird would make select appearances in the Australian Super Touring Championship for BMW Motorsport Australia. Later that year, he would team up with Paul Morris to drive in the 1997 AMP Bathurst 1000. The pairing took pole position and Baird drove the car to provisional victory. However, the team had breached the race regulation which limited any one driver to a maximum of three hours continuous driving and thus were disqualified from the overall results.

=== British Touring Car Championship ===
Despite the disappointment of the disqualification, Baird's performance had captured the attention of race teams overseas. Multiple teams from the British Touring Car Championship were in attendance and were keen to sign the Kiwi after the event. This included West Surrey Racing owner Dick Bennetts, who he was already familiar with owing to having tested Formula 3 machinery with in the past. He would eventually sign a two-year deal with West Surrey Racing to compete in the series starting from 1998, driving a Ford Mondeo. Despite early promise in pre-season testing at Donington in the previous years' Mondeo, the newer iteration used for the season proved to be uncompetitive owing to a lack of balance in the car thanks in part to the increased engine weight. Thus Baird struggled for results the entire year and was constantly changing his driving style in a bid to find improvements. However, the cars characteristics meant that it tended to excel more in wet weather conditions. He recorded a best result of sixth in the rain at Snetterton and led at Knockhill. His campaign was also intermittently interrupted by way of being subsidised for 1992 Formula One World Champion, Nigel Mansell in select rounds. After WSR lost the Ford contract for the 1999 season, Baird would leave Europe and returned to New Zealand.

=== V8 Supercars ===
Baird's first racing experience aboard a V8 Supercar came in the 1997 Primus 1000 Classic when he partnered Steven Johnson at Dick Johnson Racing. The pairing finished the race fourth albeit three laps down.

Baird made his championship debut in the category in the 1999 Queensland 500 as co-driver to Jason Bright at Stone Brothers Racing. The pairing placed their Ford Falcon on pole position for the event and were comfortably on course for victory on Sunday. However, mechanical issues forced them out of the race after 111 laps. They also demonstrated strong pace at the Bathurst 1000 but were once again overcome with mechanical issues. With Bright bound for the United States to compete in Indy Lights, this left a vacancy at Stone Brothers Racing. Following his performances in these events, Baird was promptly signed on a two-year deal as a full-time driver starting from the 2000 season.

The beginning of Baird's debut season showed tremendous promise. In the second race at the opening round at Phillip Island, Baird stormed from ninth on the grid to win the race by four seconds over Garth Tander. However, this ultimately proved to be the last time that Baird would finish on the podium in the category. After this event, Baird struggled for results for the remainder of the season and would be sacked mid-contract at the end of 2000. After losing his full-time drive for 2001, Baird paired with John Faulkner at the Queensland 500. For the Bathurst 1000, he would pair with Mark Noske to drive a Budweiser-sponsored entry run by Prancing Horse Racing. The team struggled for pace and would retire 27 laps into the event after Noske incurred a collision with Craig Lowndes at Forrest's Elbow.

In 2002, Baird would return to the series full-time. Signing with Rod Nash Racing which had formed an alliance with Peter Brock and ran under the Team Brock banner. Baird would team with Brock for the Bathurst 1000. However, they lacked pace and were plagued with mechanical issues. They finished 23rd and 25 laps down. In 2003, he moved to Team Kiwi Racing in search of greener pastures. However, the teams resources were lacking and the season passed without much note. Continuing with the team onto 2004, Baird continued to struggle with the lack of pace in the car although his racecraft did help him attain a handful of top ten finishes that year. The highlight of the season was a surprise pole position at Winton, in part thanks to changing conditions throughout the session.

Ahead of the 2005 season, Baird left Team Kiwi Racing for WPS Racing, marking his return to the Ford stable. The most noteworthy event to transpire for Baird that season was an accident that occurred during the final race at Pukekohe Park Raceway. At the end of lap 31, rain started to fall upon the circuit. This caught an array of drivers out and, in the ensuing chaos, Baird was spun by Paul Dumbrell and was sent into the wooden paddock fence used as part of the horse racing track. Baird retired from the race on the sport and the significant damage inflicted resulted in an extended red flag period. Following the conclusion of the 2005 season, WPS Racing would replace both Baird and teammate David Besnard with Jason Bargwanna and Brazilian driver, Max Wilson. With no other seats available elsewhere on the grid, this marked the last season where Baird would be a full-time driver in the V8 Supercar series.

Baird would be retained however, for the 2006 endurance events by WPS Racing. Partnering Bargwanna, achieving good results in both the Sandown 500 and Bathurst 1000. At the eleventh round in Tasmania, Baird would be afforded a one-off appearance for Team Kiwi Racing when he deputised for the injured Paul Radisich. Thereafter, Baird's racing resume in V8 Supercars was precluded purely to endurance co-driving duties. Competing with the Holden Racing Team, HSV Dealer Team, Stone Brothers Racing and Erebus Motorsport. Baird's final race in the category came in the 2016 endurance events, recording a 20th place finish in the second race at Surfers Paradise alongside main series driver, David Reynolds

=== Return to New Zealand ===
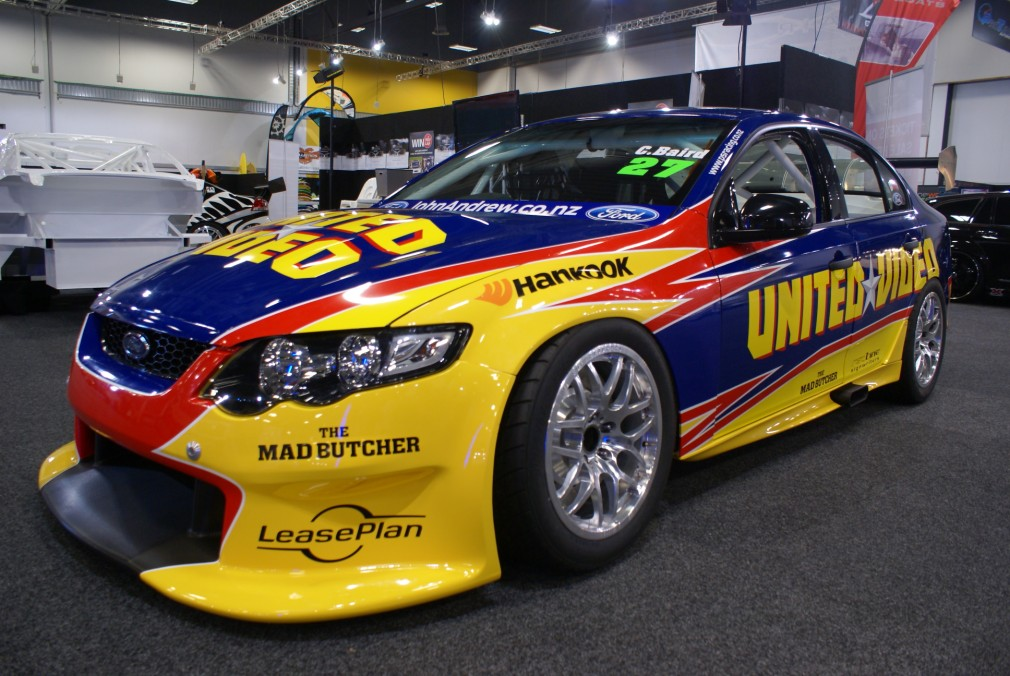
The FG Falcon that Baird drove in the inaugural V8SuperTourer series

Beginning in 2008, Baird began racing in the New Zealand V8s series. Alongside his duties in the local Porsche GT3 Cup Challenge, Baird would drive full-time with Pedersen Sheehan Racing. He finished third overall for the season with four wins to his credit. He returned the next season for the same time, this time winning the title over John McIntyre. McIntyre would reclaim the title next season as Baird narrowly missed out on the title after a trouble last couple of rounds.

Baird would take part in the inaugural running of the newly-formed V8SuperTourer series with PSR Racing. He scored two sprint championship podiums at Ruapuna and a third-placing at the same venue in the endurance series. He returned to the series for the next season, achieving similar results. Having left the series after this, Baird returned the New Zealand V8s series for 2014–15 season. This time driving in the TL class with Team Kiwi Racing. He ran a limited schedule of six races, winning two and finishing seventh in the overall standings. In the 2015–16 season, he returned for select rounds with the same team, although this time driving in Class One. He recorded two wins at Taupō and Pukekohe.

== Sports car career ==
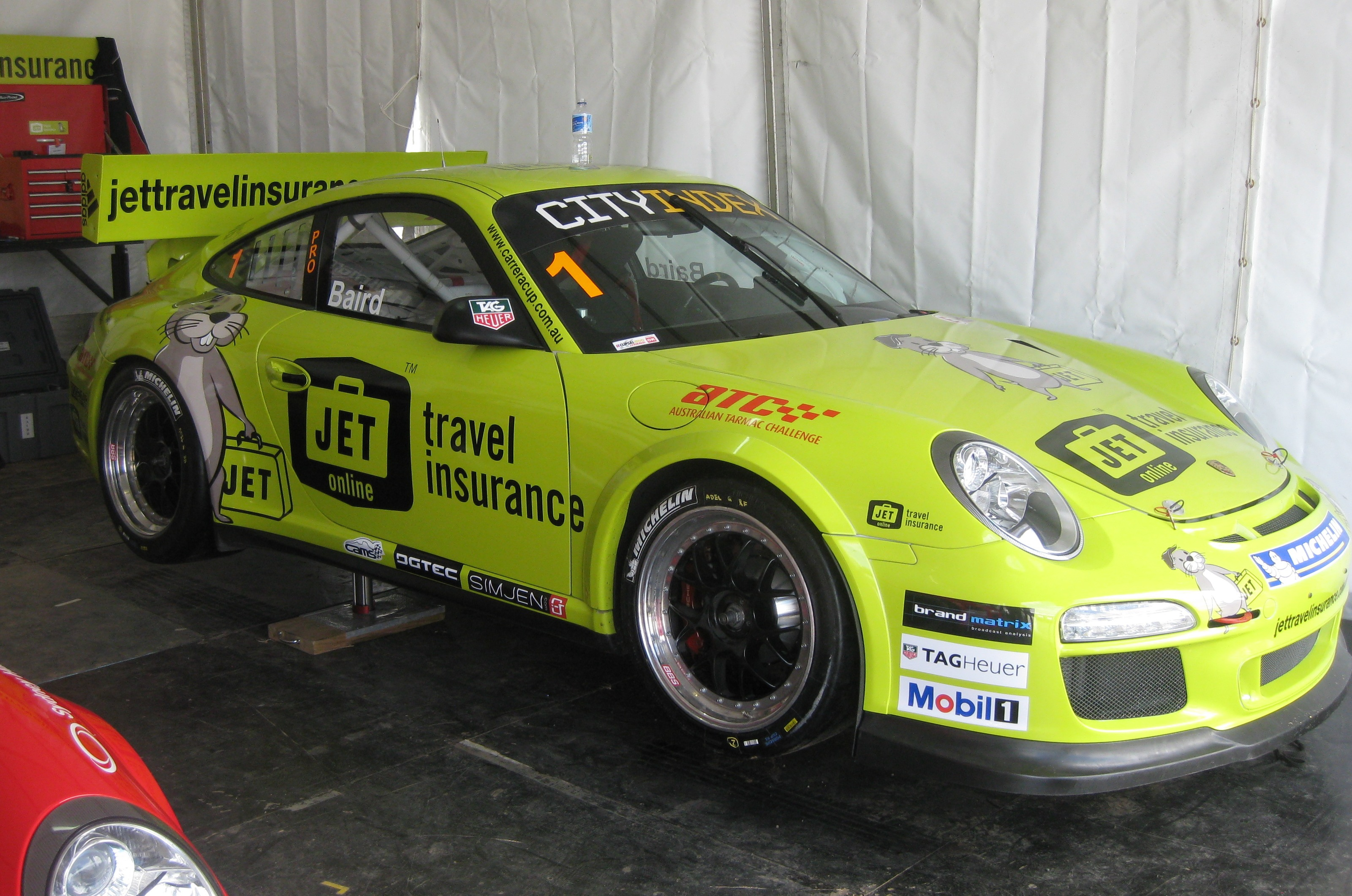
Baird won the 2012 Australian Carrera Cup Championship in this Jet Travel Insurance entry.

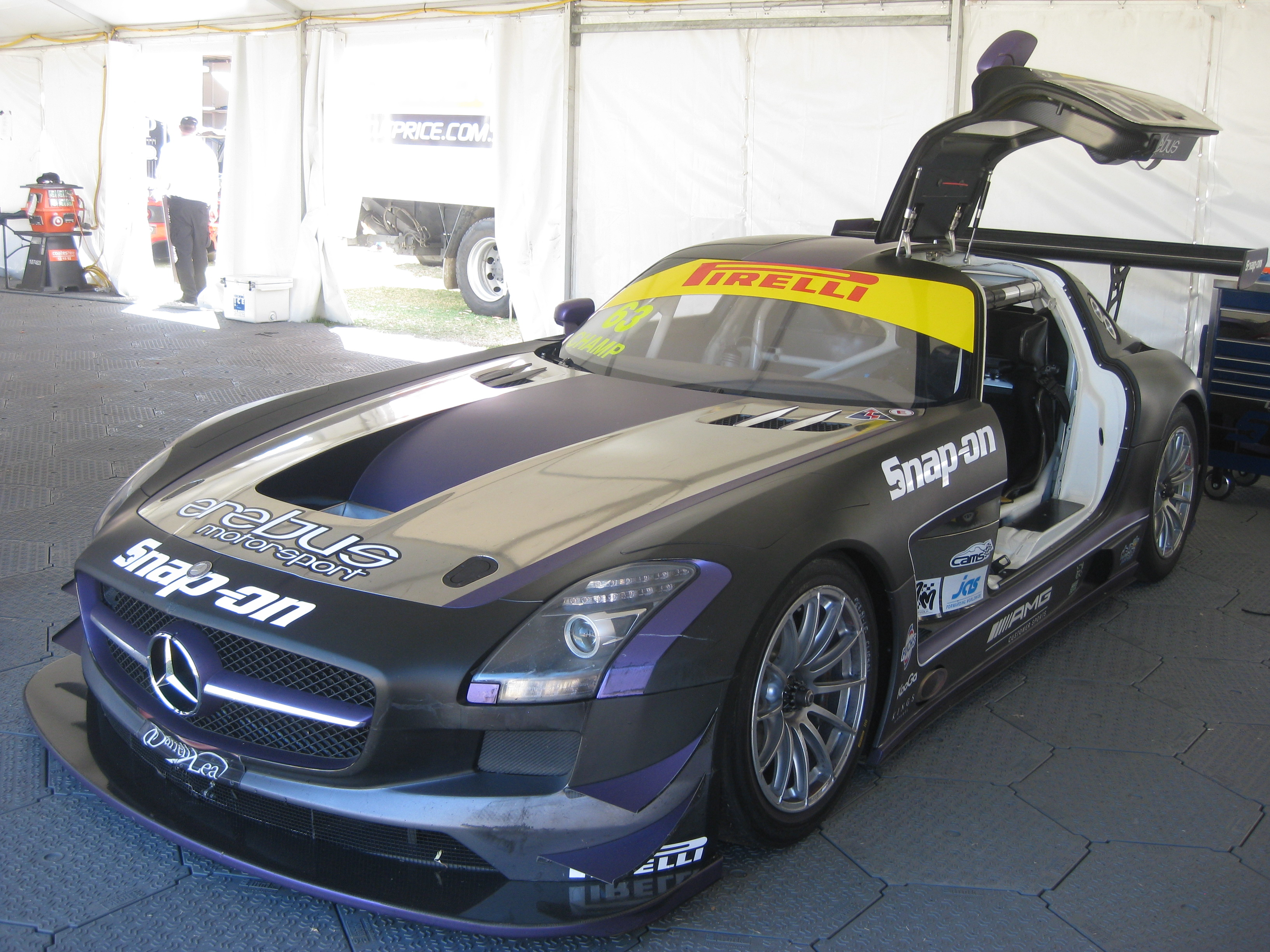
Baird placed 8th in the 2013 Australian GT Championship driving Ferrari, Mercedes-Benz (pictured) & Porsche

At the end of 1997, Baird took part in the TraNZam Championship Series. The championship utilised Trans-Am cars and took place across New Zealand over the summer spanning the end of 1997 to the beginning of 1998. He would finish second overall to series champion, Shane Drake. After returning from his failed stint in the British Touring Car Championship at the end of 1998, Baird returned to the series, once again finishing second in the championship to Drake. In his third attempt at the TraNZam crown, he finally pulled through to win the 1999-2000 championship. In this time, he began making one-off appearances in various sports car championships across the world. The first came in 1998 in the United States Road Racing Championship driving for Storm Racing in the GT category. He also drove in the Trans-Am Series for Alan Ferguson Racing in 2000. In 2001, he made select appearances in the Australian Nations Cup Championship for Prancing Horse Racing, procuring an array of podiums.

=== Porsche Carrera Cup ===
Baird first exploits in Porsche Carrera Cup machinery came in the Porsche GT3 Cup Trans-Tasman held over the summer break at the end of 2003. He was a consistent front-runner and finished the championship in third place. At the end of 2004, while still competing in the V8 Supercar series, he made his debut in the Australian Carrera Cup Championship for Team VIP Petfoods.

Following the conclusion of his full-time V8 Supercar career the end of 2005, Baird signed on to compete in the Australian Carrera Cup Championship. Taking nine wins from 24 races, Baird proved to be the pacesetter and won the overall championship ahead of Alex Davison.

== Honours ==
In the 2010 New Year Honours, Baird was appointed a Member of the New Zealand Order of Merit, for services to motorsport.

== Career results ==
=== Career summary ===
Season	Series	Team	Races	Wins	Poles	F. Laps	Podiums	Points	Position
1985–86	New Zealand Formula Ford Championship	Caltex	?	?	?	?	?	?	N/A
1986–87	New Zealand Formula Ford Championship	Caltex	21	?	?	?	1	?	N/A
1987–88	New Zealand Formula Ford Championship	Caltex	21	?	?	?	?	?	**1st**
1988	Asia-Pacific Touring Car Championship	Glenn McIntyre Racing	1	0	0	0	0	0	N/A
1989	New Zealand Formula Pacific Championship	Caltex	10	0	?	?	0	?	N/A
1990	New Zealand Formula Pacific Championship	Caltex	4	3	?	?	3	?	N/A
1990	Australian Endurance Championship	Bryce Racing	2	0	0	0	0	0	N/A
1990	SCCA Toyota Atlantic Championship (West) - Pacific		4	0	0	0	0	26	16th
1991	New Zealand Formula Pacific Championship		12	6	?	?	6	?	**1st**
1992	New Zealand Formula Pacific Championship		12	11	?	?	11	?	**1st**
1992	British Formula Two Championship	Graham Lorrimer Motorsport	10	0	0	0	0	9	10th
1992	World Cup Formula 3000	Weylock Racing	1	0	0	0	0	0	N/A
1993	New Zealand Formula Pacific Championship		10	?	?	?	?	?	**1st**
1993	Toyota Atlantic Championship		1	?	?	?	?	?	N/A
1993–94	New Zealand Touring Car Championship	BMW Motorsport New Zealand	?	?	?	?	?	?	**1st**
1994–95	New Zealand Touring Car Championship	BMW Motorsport New Zealand	?	?	?	?	?	?	**1st**
1995–96	New Zealand Touring Car Championship	BMW Motorsport New Zealand	6	?	?	?	?	?	**1st**
1996	South African Touring Car Championship	BMW Motorsport South Africa	18	0	0	0	3	27	8th
1996–97	New Zealand Touring Car Championship	BMW Motorsport New Zealand	16	12	9	4	14	543	**1st**
1997	Australian Super Touring Championship	BMW Motorsport Australia	4	0	1	1	2	35	8th
1997–98	TraNZam Championship		?	?	?	?	?	?	**2nd**
1998	British Touring Car Championship	West Surrey Racing	17	0	0	0	0	6	20th
1998	United States Road Racing Championship	Storm Racing	1	0	0	0	0	0	N/A
1998–99	TraNZam Championship		20	3	0	0	4	212	**2nd**
1999	Shell Championship Series	Stone Brothers Racing	2	0	0	0	0	0	N/A
1999–00	TraNZam Championship		?	?	?	?	?	255	**1st**
2000	Shell Championship Series	Stone Brothers Racing	31	1	0	0	1	702	15th
2000	BFGoodrich Tires Trans-Am Series	Alan Ferguson Racing	2	0	0	0	1	33	33rd
2000–01	TraNZam Championship		3	3	1	0	3	96	10th
2001	Shell Championship Series	John Faulkner Racing; Prancing Horse Racing	2	0	0	0	0	56	76th
2001	Australian Nations Cup Championship	Prancing Horse Racing	6	0	0	0	4	297	12th
2001	Australian GT Production Car Championship	Prancing Horse Racing	2	0	0	0	0	5	25th
2001–02	New Zealand Touring Car Championship		3	0	0	1	1	65	16th
2002	V8 Supercar Championship Series	Rod Nash Racing	29	0	0	0	0	380	27th
2003	V8 Supercar Championship Series	Team Kiwi Racing	22	0	0	0	0	856	30th
2003–04	Porsche GT3 Cup Trans-Tasman		7	0	0	0	6	672	**3rd**
2004	V8 Supercar Championship Series	Team Kiwi Racing	24	0	1	0	0	925	27th
2004	Australian Carrera Cup Championship	Team VIP Petfoods	9	1	0	0	4	324	13th
2004–05	Battery Town Porsche GT3 Cup		23	14	4	11	20	1444	**1st**
2005	V8 Supercar Championship Series	WPS Racing	30	0	0	0	0	980	23rd
2005	Rolex Sports Car Series - GT	Aussie Assault	1	0	0	0	0	3	190th
2005–06	Battery Town Porsche GT3 Cup	International Motorsport	20	6	1	8	19	1340	**1st**
2006	V8 Supercar Championship Series	WPS Racing; Team Kiwi Racing	4	0	0	0	0	287	38th
2006	Australian Carrera Cup Championship	Team VIP Petfoods	24	9	0	2	19	1164	**1st**
2006–07	Battery Town Porsche GT3 Cup		17	6	3	5	15	1121	**1st**
2007	V8 Supercar Championship Series	HSV Dealer Team	2	0	0	0	0	45	31st
2007	Australian Carrera Cup Championship	Team VIP Petfoods	24	7	3	7	19	1107	**3rd**
2007	Australian GT Championship	Consolidated Chemical Company	4	0	0	0	1	76	22nd
2008	V8 Supercar Championship Series	Holden Racing Team	3	0	0	0	0	118	52nd
2008	Fujitsu V8 Supercar Series	A.N.T. Racing	3	0	0	0	0	200	31st
2008	Australian Carrera Cup Championship	Fitzgerald Racing	28	14	3	11	25	1458	**1st**
2008	Battery Town Porsche GT3 Cup Challenge	Triple X Motorsport	18	14	2	5	15	1213	**1st**
2008	FIA GT Championship - GT2	Juniper Racing	1	0	0	0	0	0.5	30th
2008	24H Series - A6	Team VIP Petfoods 1	1	1	0	0	1	30	**1st**
2008–09	Battery Town Porsche GT3 Cup Challenge		18	12	1	6	18	1295	**1st**
2008–09	New Zealand V8s	Pedersen Sheehan Racing	21	4	2	4	9	1048	**3rd**
2009	V8 Supercar Championship Series	Holden Racing Team	3	0	0	0	0	249	36th
2009	Australian GT Championship	John Teulan Racing	5	3	2	3	3	114	18th
2009	Porsche Carrera Cup Asia	Team PCS Racing	1	0	0	0	1	0	N/A
2009–10	Battery Town Porsche GT3 Cup Challenge	Triple X Motorsport	18	5	1	7	15	1415	**1st**
2009–10	New Zealand V8s	Pedersen Sheehan Racing	18	4	0	2	11	1041	**1st**
2010	V8 Supercar Championship Series	Walkinshaw Racing	2	0	0	0	0	98	62nd
2010	Fujitsu V8 Supercar Series	Eggleston Motorsport	2	0	0	0	0	133	35th
2010	Porsche Carrera Cup Asia	Team PCS Racing	10	2	0	0	6	148	**3rd**
2010–11	Battery Town Porsche GT3 Cup Challenge	Triple X Motorsport	18	9	3	9	12	1037	**2nd**
2010–11	New Zealand V8s	Pedersen Sheehan Racing	21	2	0	3	11	1075	**2nd**
2011	International V8 Supercars Championship	Walkinshaw Racing	3	0	0	0	0	148	62nd
2011	Australian Carrera Cup Championship	Dutton Insurance Racing	21	7	2	4	12	980	**1st**
2011	Porsche Carrera Cup Asia	SC Global Racing	2	0	0	1	2	0	N/A
2011	Porsche Carrera World Cup	Porsche AG	1	0	0	0	0	0	39th
2011	Australian GT Championship	Hallmarc	1	0	0	0	1	50	20th
2012	International V8 Supercars Championship	Stone Brothers Racing	3	0	0	0	0	343	39th
2012	Australian Carrera Cup Championship	Dutton Insurance Racing	24	10	3	4	22	1267	**1st**
2012	Porsche Carrera Cup Asia	SC Global Racing	1	1	0	1	1	0	N/A
2012	V8 SuperTourer Championship - Sprint	PSR Racing	12	0	0	0	2	1604	8th
2012	V8 SuperTourer Championship - Endurance	PSR Racing	7	0	0	0	1	976	6th
2013	International V8 Supercars Championship	Erebus Motorsport	5	0	0	0	0	546	34th
2013	Australian Carrera Cup Championship	Alliance Group Racing	20	8	1	2	13	972.5	**1st**
2013	Porsche Carrera Cup Asia	Team Carrera Cup Asia	1	0	0	0	1	0	N/A
2013	V8 SuperTourer Championship	PSR Racing	15	0	0	0	1	1710	12th
2013	V8 SuperTourer Championship - Endurance	PSR Racing	8	0	0	0	0	960	8th
2013	Australian GT Championship	Clearwater Racing; Erebus Motorsport; VIP Petfoods	6	2	2	4	6	220	9th
2014	International V8 Supercars Championship	Erebus Motorsport	5	0	0	0	0	72	52nd
2014	Australian Carrera Cup Championship	Porsche Centre Melbourne	22	4	0	2	7	914	**3rd**
2014	GT Asia Series - GT3	Clearwater Racing	7	0	0	0	0	43	16th
2014	Australian GT Championship	VIP Petfoods Racing	1	0	0	0	0	30	28th
2014–15	New Zealand V8s - TL	Team Kiwi Racing	11	2	1	5	8	587	7th
2015	Australian Carrera Cup Championship	Porsche Centre Melbourne	22	0	0	1	5	806	5th
2015	Porsche Carrera Cup Asia	Clearwater Racing	14	2	1	2	8	216	**2nd**
2015	GT Asia Series - GT3	Clearwater Racing	2	0	0	0	0	9	42nd
2015	Australian GT Championship	Scott Taylor Motorsport	2	0	0	0	1	81	29th
2015	Australian Manufacturers' Championship	Alphera Financial Services	1	0	0	0	1	90	23rd
2015–16	NZ Touring Cars Championship - Class One	Team Kiwi Racing	5	2	0	0	2	253	13th
2016	International V8 Supercars Championship	Erebus Motorsport	7	0	0	0	0	219	50th
2016	Australian Endurance Championship	Erebus Motorsport	3	1	1	0	1	351	6th
2016	Australian GT Championship	Scott Taylor Motorsport	13	3	0	4	5	581	**2nd**
2016	Intercontinental GT Challenge	Keltic Racing	1	0	0	0	0	0	N/A
2017	Australian GT Championship	Scott Taylor Motorsport	3	0	0	0	0	35	32nd
2017	Australian Endurance Championship	Scott Taylor Motorsport	2	0	0	0	0	6	37th
2017	Intercontinental GT Challenge	HTP Motorsport	1	0	0	0	0	0	N/A
2018	Australian GT Championship	Scott Taylor Motorsport	6	2	1	1	2	578	13th
2018	Intercontinental GT Challenge	Scott Taylor Motorsport	1	0	0	0	0	2	24th
2019	Australian GT Championship	Scott Taylor Motorsport	2	0	0	0	0	190	19th

=== Supercars Championship results ===
(Races in bold indicate pole position) (Races in italics indicate fastest lap)

Supercars results
Year	Team	Car	1	2	3	4	5	6	7	8	9	10	11	12	13	14	15	16	17	18	19	20	21	22	23	24	25	26	27	28	29	30	31	32	33	34	35	36	37	38	39	Position	Points
1999	Stone Brothers Racing	Ford Falcon (AU)	EAS; R1	EAS; R2	EAS; R3	ADE; R4	BAR; R5	BAR; R6	BAR; R7	PHI; R8	PHI; R9	PHI; R10	HID; R11	HID; R12	HID; R13	SAN; R14	SAN; R15	SAN; R16	QLD; R17	QLD; R18	QLD; R19	CAL; R20	CAL; R21	CAL; R22	SYM; R23	SYM; R24	SYM; R25	WIN; R26	WIN; R27	WIN; R28	ORA; R29	ORA; R30	ORA; R31	QLD; R32; Ret	BAT; R33; Ret							N/A	0
2000	Stone Brothers Racing	Ford Falcon (AU)	PHI; R1; 9	PHI; R2; 1	BAR; R3; 28	BAR; R4; 14	BAR; R5; 12	ADE; R6; 13	ADE; R7; 15	EAS; R8; 10	EAS; R9; 7	EAS; R10; Ret	HDV; R11; 14	HDV; R12; 8	HDV; R13; 6	CAN; R14; Ret	CAN; R15; Wth	CAN; R16; Wth	QLD; R17; 14	QLD; R18; Ret	QLD; R19; 15	WIN; R20; 16	WIN; R21; 13	WIN; R22; 5	ORA; R23; 20	ORA; R24; 10	ORA; R25; 25	CAL; R26; 23	CAL; R27; 22	CAL; R28; 19	QLD; R29; 10	SAN; R30; 14	SAN; R31; 11	SAN; R32; 10	BAT; R33; 7							15th	702
2001	John Faulkner Racing	Holden Commodore (VT)	PHI; R1	PHI; R2	ADE; R3	ADE; R4	EAS; R5	EAS; R6	HDV; R7	HDV; R8	HDV; R9	CAN; R10	CAN; R11	CAN; R12	BAR; R13	BAR; R14	BAR; R15	CAL; R16	CAL; R17	CAL; R18	ORA; R19	ORA; R20	QLD; R21; Ret	WIN; R22	WIN; R23	BAT; R24	PUK; R25	PUK; R26	PUK; R27	SAN; R28	SAN; R29	SAN; R30										76th	56
2001	Prancing Horse Racing	Ford Falcon (AU)	PHI; R1	PHI; R2	ADE; R3	ADE; R4	EAS; R5	EAS; R6	HDV; R7	HDV; R8	HDV; R9	CAN; R10	CAN; R11	CAN; R12	BAR; R13	BAR; R14	BAR; R15	CAL; R16	CAL; R17	CAL; R18	ORA; R19	ORA; R20	QLD; R21	WIN; R22	WIN; R23	BAT; R24; Ret	PUK; R25	PUK; R26	PUK; R27	SAN; R28	SAN; R29	SAN; R30										76th	56
2002	Rod Nash Racing	Holden Commodore (VX)	ADE; R1; 12	ADE; R2; Ret	PHI; R3; 15	PHI; R4; 12	EAS; R5; 26	EAS; R6; 20	EAS; R7; Ret	HDV; R8; 26	HDV; R9; 15	HDV; R10; 22	CAN; R11; 15	CAN; R12; 11	CAN; R13; 13	BAR; R14; 25	BAR; R15; 19	BAR; R16; Ret	ORA; R17; 17	ORA; R18; Ret	WIN; R19; 21	WIN; R20; 14	QLD; R21; Ret	BAT; R22; 23	SUR; R23; Ret	SUR; R24; 12	PUK; R25; 18	PUK; R26; Ret	PUK; R27; Ret	SAN; R28; 21	SAN; R29; Ret											27th	380
2003	Team Kiwi Racing	Holden Commodore (VX)	ADE; R1; 21	ADE; R1; 14	PHI; R3; 19	EAS; R4; 24	WIN; R5; DSQ	BAR; R6; 25	BAR; R7; 24	BAR; R8; 22	HDV; R9; 22	HDV; R10; 19	HDV; R11; 27	QLD; R12; 18	ORA; R13; 22	SAN; R14; Ret	BAT; R15; 17	SUR; R16; 21	SUR; R17; 14	PUK; R18; 23	PUK; R19; 19	PUK; R20; 22	EAS; R21; 26	EAS; R22; 20																		30th	856
2004	Team Kiwi Racing	Holden Commodore (VY)	ADE; R1; 16	ADE; R2; 12	EAS; R3; 9	PUK; R4; 9	PUK; R5; 17	PUK; R6; 20	HDV; R7; 16	HDV; R8; 31	HDV; R9; 20	BAR; R10; 23	BAR; R11; Ret	BAR; R12; DNS	QLD; R13; 17	**WIN**; **R14**; **22**	ORA; R15; 31	ORA; R16; 15	SAN; R17; 13	BAT; R18; Ret	SUR; R19; Ret	SUR; R20; 22	SYM; R21; 27	SYM; R22; Ret	SYM; R23; DNS	EAS; R24; Ret	EAS; R25; 16	EAS; R26; 17														27th	925
2005	WPS Racing	Ford Falcon (BA)	ADE; R1; Ret	ADE; R2; 10	PUK; R3; Ret	PUK; R4; 12	PUK; R5; Ret	BAR; R6; 19	BAR; R7; 20	BAR; R8; 16	EAS; R9; 21	EAS; R10; 17	SHA; R11; 24	SHA; R12; 19	SHA; R13; 15	HDV; R14; 27	HDV; R15; 20	HDV; R16; 16	QLD; R17; 16	ORA; R18; Ret	ORA; R19; Ret	SAN; R20; 19	BAT; R21; 8	SUR; R22; 11	SUR; R23; 12	SUR; R24; 29	SYM; R25; 26	SYM; R26; 18	SYM; R27; 27	PHI; R28; 30	PHI; R29; 27	PHI; R30; 29										23rd	980
2006	WPS Racing	Ford Falcon (BA)	ADE; R1	ADE; R2	PUK; R3	PUK; R4	PUK; R5	BAR; R6	BAR; R7	BAR; R8	WIN; R9	WIN; R10	WIN; R11	HDV; R12	HDV; R13	HDV; R14	QLD; R15	QLD; R16	QLD; R17	ORA; R18	ORA; R19	ORA; R20	SAN; R21; 7	BAT; R22; 10	SUR; R23	SUR; R24	SUR; R25	SYM; R26	SYM; R27	SYM; R28	BHR; R29	BHR; R30	BHR; R31	PHI; R32	PHI; R33	PHI; R34						38th	287
2006	Team Kiwi Racing	Holden Commodore (VZ)	ADE; R1	ADE; R2	PUK; R3	PUK; R4	PUK; R5	BAR; R6	BAR; R7	BAR; R8	WIN; R9	WIN; R10	WIN; R11	HDV; R12	HDV; R13	HDV; R14	QLD; R15	QLD; R16	QLD; R17	ORA; R18	ORA; R19	ORA; R20	SAN; R21	BAT; R22	SUR; R23	SUR; R24	SUR; R25	SYM; R26; 25	SYM; R27; Ret	SYM; R28; DNS	BHR; R29	BHR; R30	BHR; R31	PHI; R32	PHI; R33	PHI; R34						38th	287
2007	HSV Dealer Team	Holden Commodore (VE)	ADE; R1	ADE; R2	BAR; R3	BAR; R4	BAR; R5	PUK; R6	PUK; R7	PUK; R8	WIN; R9	WIN; R10	WIN; R11	EAS; R12	EAS; R13	EAS; R14	HDV; R15	HDV; R16	HDV; R17	QLD; R18	QLD; R19	QLD; R20	ORA; R21	ORA; R22	ORA; R23	SAN; R24; 4	BAT; R25; Ret	SUR; R26	SUR; R27	SUR; R28	BHR; R29	BHR; R30	BHR; R31	SYM; R32	SYM; R33	SYM; R34	PHI; R35	PHI; R36	PHI; R37			31st	45
2008	Holden Racing Team	Holden Commodore (VE)	ADE; R1	ADE; R2	EAS; R3	EAS; R4	EAS; R5	HAM; R6	HAM; R7	HAM; R8	BAR; R9	BAR; R10	BAR; R11	SAN; R12	SAN; R13	SAN; R14	HDV; R15	HDV; R16	HDV; R17	QLD; R18	QLD; R19	QLD; R20	WIN; R21	WIN; R22	WIN; R23	PHI; Q 27	PHI; R24; 14	BAT; R25; Ret	SUR; R26	SUR; R27	SUR; R28	BHR; R29	BHR; R30	BHR; R31	SYM; R32	SYM; R33	SYM; R34	ORA; R35	ORA; R36	ORA; R37		52nd	118
2009	Holden Racing Team	Holden Commodore (VE)	ADE; R1	ADE; R2	HAM; R3	HAM; R4	WIN; R5	WIN; R6	SYM; R7	SYM; R8	HDV; R9	HDV; R10	TOW; R11	TOW; R12	SAN; R13	SAN; R14	QLD; R15	QLD; R16	PHI; Q 24	PHI; R17; 8	BAT; R18; 21	SUR; R19	SUR; R20	SUR; R21	SUR; R22	PHI; R23	PHI; R24	BAR; R25	BAR; R26	SYD; R27	SYD; R28											36th	249
2010	Walkinshaw Racing	Holden Commodore (VE)	YMC; R1	YMC; R2	BHR; R3	BHR; R4	ADE; R5	ADE; R6	HAM; R7	HAM; R8	QLD; R9	QLD; R10	WIN; R11	WIN; R12	HDV; R13	HDV; R14	TOW; R15	TOW; R16	PHI; R17; 19	BAT; R18; Ret	SUR; R19	SUR; R20	SYM; R21	SYM; R22	SAN; R23	SAN; R24	SYD; R25	SYD; R26														62nd	98
2011	Walkinshaw Racing	Holden Commodore (VE)	YMC; R1	YMC; R2	ADE; R3	ADE; R4	HAM; R5	HAM; R6	BAR; R7	BAR; R8	BAR; R9	WIN; R10	WIN; R11	HID; R12	HID; R13	TOW; R14	TOW; R15	QLD; R16	QLD; R17	QLD; R18	PHI; R19; 10	BAT; R20; Ret	SUR; R21	SUR; R22	SYM; R23	SYM; R24	SAN; R25	SAN; R26	SYD; R27	SYD; R28												62nd	148
2012	Stone Brothers Racing	Ford Falcon (FG)	ADE; R1	ADE; R2	SYM; R3	SYM; R4	HAM; R5	HAM; R6	BAR; R7	BAR; R8	BAR; R9	PHI; R10	PHI; R11	HID; R12	HID; R13	TOW; R14	TOW; R15	QLD; R16	QLD; R17	SMP; R18	SMP; R19	SAN; QR; 14	SAN; R20; 8	BAT; R21; 8	SUR; R22	SUR; R23	YMC; R24	YMC; R25	YMC; R26	WIN; R27	WIN; R28	SYD; R29	SYD; R30									39th	343
2013	Erebus Motorsport	Mercedes-Benz E63 AMG	ADE; R1	ADE; R2	SYM; R3	SYM; R4	SYM; R5	PUK; R6	PUK; R7	PUK; R8	PUK; R9	BAR; R10	BAR; R11	BAR; R12	COA; R13	COA; R14	COA; R15	COA; R16	HID; R17	HID; R18	HID; R19	TOW; R20	TOW; R21	QLD; R22	QLD; R23	QLD; R24	WIN; R25	WIN; R26	WIN; R27	SAN; R28; 4	BAT; R29; 14	SUR; R30; 12	SUR; R31; 5	PHI; R32	PHI; R33	PHI; R34	SYD; R35	SYD; R36				34th	546
2014	Erebus Motorsport	Mercedes-Benz E63 AMG	ADE; R1	ADE; R2	ADE; R3	SYM; R4	SYM; R5	SYM; R6	WIN; R7	WIN; R8	WIN; R9	PUK; R10	PUK; R11	PUK; R12	PUK; R13	BAR; R14	BAR; R15	BAR; R16	HID; R17	HID; R18	HID; R19	TOW; R20	TOW; R21	TOW; R22	QLD; R23	QLD; R24	QLD; R25	SMP; R26	SMP; R27	SMP; R28	SAN; QR; 14	SAN; R29; Ret	BAT; R30; Ret	SUR; R31; 11	SUR; R32; Ret	PHI; R33	PHI; R34	PHI; R35	SYD; R36	SYD; R37	SYD; R38	52nd	72
2016	Erebus Motorsport	Holden Commodore (VF)	ADE; R1	ADE; R2	ADE; R3	SYM; R4	SYM; R5	PHI; R6	PHI; R7	BAR; R8	BAR; R9	WIN; R10	WIN; R11	HID; R12	HID; R13	TOW; R14	TOW; R15	QLD; R16; 24	QLD; R17; 22	SMP; R18	SMP; R19	SAN; QR; 22	SAN; R20; DSQ	BAT; R21; 18	SUR; R22; Ret	SUR; R23; 20	PUK; R24	PUK; R25	PUK; R26	PUK; R27	SYD; R28	SYD; R29										50th	219

=== Australian Carrera Cup Championship results ===
(key) (Races in bold indicate pole position – 1 point awarded all races) (Races in italics indicate fastest lap) (* signifies that driver lead feature race for at least one lap – 1 point awarded)

Year	Team	Car	1	2	3	4	5	6	7	8	9	10	11	12	13	14	15	16	17	18	19	20	21	22	23	24	25	26	27	28	Pos	Pts
2006	Sherrin Motor Sport	Porsche 911 GT3 Cup	ADE; R1	ADE; R2	ADE; R3	WAK; R4	WAK; R5	WAK; R6	HID; R7	HID; R8	HID; R9	ORA; R10	ORA; R11	ORA; R12	SAN; R13	SAN; R14	SAN; R15	BAT; R16	BAT; R17	BAT; R18	SUR; R19	SUR; R20	SUR; R21	PHI; R22	PHI; R23	PHI; R24					6th	633
2007	Sherrin Motor Sport	Porsche 911 GT3 Cup	ADE; R1	ADE; R2	ADE; R3	WIN; R4	WIN; R5	WIN; R6	HID; R7	HID; R8	HID; R9	QLD; R10	QLD; R11	QLD; R12	ORA; R13	ORA; R14	ORA; R15	SAN; R16	SAN; R17	SAN; R18	BAT; R19	BAT; R20	BAT; R21	SUR; R22	SUR; R23	SUR; R24					8th	533
2008	Fitzgerald Racing	Porsche 911 GT3 Cup	ADE; R1	ADE; R2	ADE; R3	ALB; R4	ALB; R5	ALB; R6	ALB; R7	WAK; R8	WAK; R9	WAK; R10	BAR; R11	BAR; R12	BAR; R13	SAN; R14	SAN; R15	SAN; R16	QLD; R17	QLD; R18	QLD; R19	PHI; R20	PHI; R21	PHI; R22	BAT; R23	BAT; R24	BAT; R25	SUR; R26	SUR; R27	SUR; R28	1st	1458
2011	Dutton Insurance Racing	Porsche 911 GT3 Cup	ALB; R1; 2	ALB; R2; 1	ALB; R3; 1	BAR; R4; 4	BAR; R5; 2	BAR; R6; 6	TOW; R7; 4	TOW; R8; 3	TOW; R9; 4	PHI; R10; 2	PHI; R11; 1	PHI; R12; 11	BAT; R13; 4	BAT; R14; 4	BAT; R15; 1	SUR; R16; 1	SUR; R17; 1	SUR; R18; 1	HOM; R19; 2	HOM; R20; 6	HOM; R21; Ret								1st	980
2012	Alliance Group Racing	Porsche 911 GT3 Cup	ADE; R1; 7	ADE; R2; 2	ADE; R3; 1	ALB; R4; 1	ALB; R5; 1	ALB; R6; 1	**BAR**; **R7**; **3**	BAR; R8; 2	BAR; R9; 2	PHI; R10; 3	PHI; R11; 1	PHI; R12; 3	TOW; R13; 3	TOW; R14; 2	TOW; R15; 3	**BAT**; **R16**; **1**	BAT; R17; 1	BAT; R18; 1	**SUR**; **R19**; **1**	SUR; R20; 1	SUR; R21; 8	HOM; R22; 2	HOM; R23; 2	HOM; R24; 3					1st	1267
2013	Alliance Group Racing	Porsche 911 GT3 Cup	ADE; R1	ADE; R2	ADE; R3	ALB; R4	ALB; R5	ALB; R6	SYD; R7	SYD; R8	TOW; R9	TOW; R10	TOW; R11	WIN; R12	WIN; R13	WIN; R14	BAT; R15	BAT; R16	BAT; R17	SUR; R18	SUR; R19	SUR; R20									1st	972.5
2014	Alliance Group Racing	Porsche 911 GT3 Cup	ADE; R1	ADE; R2	ADE; R3	ALB; R4	ALB; R5	ALB; R6	PHI; R7	PHI; R8	TOW; R9	TOW; R10	TOW; R11	SMP; R12	SMP; R13	SMP; R14	SAN; R15	SAN; R16	SAN; R17	BAT; R18	BAT; R19	BAT; R20	SUR; R21	SUR; R22	SUR; R23						3rd	914
2015	Porsche Centre Melbourne	Porsche 911 GT3 Cup	ADE; R1	ADE; R2	ADE; R3	ALB; R4	ALB; R5	ALB; R6	PHI; R7	PHI; R8	TOW; R9	TOW; R10	TOW; R11	SMP; R12	SMP; R13	SMP; R14	SAN; R15	SAN; R16	SAN; R17	BAT; R18	BAT; R19	SUR; R20	SUR; R21	SUR; R22							5th	806

=== British Touring Car Championship results ===
(key) (Races in bold indicate pole position – 1 point awarded all races) (Races in italics indicate fastest lap) (* signifies that driver lead feature race for at least one lap – 1 point awarded)

Year	Team	Car	1	2	3	4	5	6	7	8	9	10	11	12	13	14	15	16	17	18	19	20	21	22	23	24	25	26	Pos	Pts
1998	Ford Mondeo Racing	Ford Mondeo	THR; 1; 15	THR; 2; 14	SIL; 1 Ret	SIL; 2; 10	DON; 1; 14	DON; 2; 13	BRH; 1; 15	BRH; 2 Ret	OUL; 1; 14	OUL; 2; 11	DON; 1	DON; 2	CRO; 1; 14	CRO; 2; 13	SNE; 1; 11	SNE; 2; 6	THR; 1 Ret	THR; 2 DNS	KNO; 1; 12	KNO; 2; 13*	BRH; 1	BRH; 2	OUL; 1	OUL; 2	SIL; 1	SIL; 2	20th	6

Note: No points were awarded for leading in the feature race at Knockhill.

=== Bathurst 1000 results ===
Year	Car#	Team	Car	Co-driver	Position	Laps
1990	54	Diet Coke Racing	BMW 318i	(New Zealand) Brett Riley	DNF	82
1994	45	Diet Coke Racing	BMW 318i	(New Zealand) Brett Riley	11th	152
1997*	2	BMW Motorsport Australia	BMW 320i	(Australia) Paul Morris	DSQ	161
1997	18	Dick Johnson Racing	Ford EL Falcon	(Australia) Steven Johnson	4th	158
1999	4	Stone Brothers Racing	Ford AU Falcon	(Australia) Jason Bright	DNF	145
2000	4	Stone Brothers Racing	Ford AU Falcon	(New Zealand) Simon Wills	7th	161
2001	888	Prancing Horse Racing	Ford AU Falcon	(Australia) Mark Noske	DNF	27
2002	05	Team Brock	Holden VX Commodore	(Australia) Peter Brock	23rd	136
2003	021	Team Kiwi Racing	Holden VX Commodore	(New Zealand) Mark Porter	17th	149
2004	021	Team Kiwi Racing	Holden VY Commodore	(New Zealand) Mark Porter	DNF	129
2005	48	WPS Racing	Ford BA Falcon	(Australia) David Besnard	8th	158
2006	10	WPS Racing	Ford BA Falcon	(Australia) Jason Bargwanna	10th	161
2007	16	HSV Dealer Team	Holden VE Commodore	(New Zealand) Paul Radisich	DNF	137
2008	2	Holden Racing Team	Holden VE Commodore	(Australia) Glenn Seton	DNF	146
2009	22	Holden Racing Team	Holden VE Commodore	(Australia) Paul Dumbrell	21st	153
2010	24	Walkinshaw Racing	Holden VE Commodore	(New Zealand) Fabian Coulthard	DNF	0
2011	61	Walkinshaw Racing	Holden VE Commodore	(New Zealand) Fabian Coulthard	DNF	13
2012	4	Stone Brothers Racing	Ford FG Falcon	(Australia) Lee Holdsworth	8th	161
2013	4	Erebus Motorsport	Mercedes-Benz E63 AMG	(Australia) Lee Holdsworth	14th	161
2014	4	Erebus Motorsport	Mercedes-Benz E63 AMG	(Australia) Lee Holdsworth	DNF	132
2016	9	Erebus Motorsport	Holden VF Commodore	(Australia) David Reynolds	18th	148

* Super Touring race

=== Bathurst 12 Hour results ===
Year	Team	Co-drivers	Car	Class	Laps	Overall position	Class position
2007	(Australia) Eastern Creek Karts P/L	(Australia) Paul Morris (Australia) Garry Holt	BMW 335i	A	257	**1st**	**1st**
2008	(Australia) Eastern Creek Karts P/L	(Australia) Paul Morris (Australia) Garry Holt	BMW 335i	B	252	**3rd**	**1st**
2009	(Australia) Wilson Brothers Racing	(Australia) Lee Castle (Australia) Rodney Forbes	Subaru Impreza WRX	C	65	DNF	DNF
2011	(Australia) VIP Pet Foods Racing	(Australia) Klark Quinn (United Kingdom) Tony Quinn	Porsche 997 GT3 Cup R	A	291	**3rd**	**3rd**
2012	(Singapore) Clearwater Racing	(Republic of Ireland) Matt Griffin (Singapore) Weng Sun Mok	Ferrari 458 GT3	A	268	**3rd**	**3rd**
2013	(Singapore) Clearwater Racing	(Republic of Ireland) Matt Griffin (Singapore) Weng Sun Mok	Ferrari 458 GT3	A	267	**2nd**	**2nd**
2014	(Singapore) Clearwater Racing	(Republic of Ireland) Matt Griffin (Japan) Hiroshi Hamaguachi (Singapore) Weng Sun Mok	Ferrari 458 GT3	A	57	DNF	DNF
2015	(Australia) M Motorsport	(Australia) Justin McMillan (New Zealand) Steven Richards	Lamborghini Gallardo LP560-4	AP	129	DNF	DNF
2016	(Australia) Darrell Lea	(Australia) Klark Quinn (United Kingdom) Tony Quinn	McLaren 650S GT3	AA	171	DNF	DNF
2017	(Australia) Scott Taylor Motorsports	(Germany) Maro Engel (New Zealand) Shane van Gisbergen	Mercedes AMG GT3	AA	283	DNF	DNF
2018	(Australia) Scott Taylor Motorsports	(Australia) Tony D'Alberto (Australia) Max Twigg	Mercedes AMG GT3	APA	268	12th	6th

Sporting positions
Preceded by Ken Smith	Winner of the New Zealand Grand Prix; 1991, 1992, 1993	Succeeded by Greg Murphy
Preceded by Fabian Coulthard	Winner of the Australian Carrera Cup Championship; 2006	Succeeded by David Reynolds
Preceded by John Bowe; Dick Johnson	Winner of the Bathurst 12 Hour; 2007 (with Paul Morris & Garry Holt)	Succeeded by Graham Alexander; Rod Salmon; Damien White
Preceded by David Reynolds	Winner of the Australian Carrera Cup Championship; 2008, 2011-2013	Succeeded by Steven Richards
