= 2006 Australian Carrera Cup Championship =

Car racing championship

Seasons
- ← 2005 2007 →

The 2006 Australian Carrera Cup Championship was a CAMS sanctioned motor racing title for drivers of Porsche 911 GT3 Cup Cars. It was the fourth Australian Carrera Cup Championship.

== Calendar ==
The championship was contested over an eight round series with three races per round.

- Round 1, Adelaide Parklands Circuit, South Australia, 23-26 March
- Round 2, Wakefield Park Raceway, New South Wales, 26-28 May
- Round 3, Hidden Valley Raceway, Northern Territory, 30 June - 1 July
- Round 4, Oran Park Motorsport Circuit, New South Wales, 11-13 August
- Round 5, Sandown International Motor Raceway, Victoria, 1-3 September
- Round 6, Mount Panorama Circuit, Bathurst, New South Wales, 5-8 October
- Round 7, Surfers Paradise Street Circuit, Queensland, 20-22 October
- Round 8, Phillip Island Grand Prix Circuit, Victoria, 8-10 December

The series was administered by CupCar Australia and promoted as the “Wright, Patton, Shakespeare Carrera Cup Australia”.

== Points system ==
Championship points were awarded in each race on the following basis:

Position	1st	2nd	3rd	4th	5th	6th	7th	8th	9th	10th	11th	12th	13th	14th	15th	16th	17th	18th	19th	20th	21st -last
Points	60	54	48	42	36	30	27	24	21	18	15	12	9	6	6	3	3	3	3	3	1

== Results ==
Position	Driver	No.	Entrant	R1	R2	R3	R4	R5	R6	R7	R8	Penalty	Total
1	Craig Baird	4	VIP Petfoods	174	180	174	168	156	150	48	114	-	1164
2	Alex Davison	21	Glenfords Tool Centres / Dewalt	168	49	168	174	117	141	120	162	-	1099
3	David Reynolds	14	Bob Jane T-Marts	144	66	96	99	162	174	108	180	-	1029
4	Jim Richards	2	OAMPS Insurance Brokers / Greenfield Mowers	126	156	138	48	78	120	90	72	-6	822
5	Jonathon Webb	22	Glenfords Tool Centres /Makita	84	105	42	72	111	93	66	84	-	657
6	David Russell	9	Boom Logistics / Sherrin Hire	39	117	57	117	81	42	72	108	-	633
7	David Wall	38	Glenfords Tool Centres / Hitachi	48	42	57	81	33	120	51	132	-	564
8	Dean Fiore	15	Landscape Developments	102	36	48	45	114	45	-	81	-	471
9	Anthony Tratt	75	Toll Racing	57	45	63	48	42	21	45	69	-	390
10	Rodney Jane	7	Bob Jane T-Marts	30	21	15	69	69	66	63	27	-	360
11	Ian Dyk	8	Juniper Development Group	69	111	108	60	-	-	-	-	-	348
12	Aaron Caratti	23	Firepower Racing	39	84	93	21	18	15	3	57	-6	324
13	Klark Quinn	5	VIP Petfoods	54	42	27	3	33	51	21	36	-	267
14	Peter Fitzgerald	6	Acer / Leading Solutions/ Hitachi	39	63	9	-	-	51	36	24	-	222
15	Tony Quinn	29	VIP Petfoods	9	9	36	27	33	39	18	30	-	201
16	Luke Youlden	6	Acer / Leading Solutions/ Hitachi	-	-	-	87	105	-	-	-	-	192
17	Bryce Washington	54	ADRAD Radiators	6	-	69	42	-	42	21	-	-	180
18	Ash Samadi	55	Roock	9	33	16	21	21	12	6	10	-	128
19	Dean Grant	11	Hankook Tyres / Bended Elbow Hotel	27	18	12	12	12	9	9	27	-	126
20	John Kaias	77	Abcor	15	21	21	18	3	-	18	-	-	96
21	Daniel Pappas	19	Sherrin Motorsports	6	18	6	18	39	-	-	-	-	87
22	Paul Freestone	25	Startrack Express	6	39	3	-	18	21	-	3	-5	85
23	Marc Cini	12	Hallmarc	7	6	9	15	9	9	12	9	-	76
24	Shaun Juniper	8	Juniper Development Group	-	-	-	-	6	7	12	18	-	43
25	Matthew Coleman	77	Abcor	-	-	-	-	-	33	-	9	-	42
26	Max Twigg	19	Twigg Waste Management Service	-	-	-	-	-	9	12	9	-	30
27	Damien Flack	54	ADRAD Radiators	-	-	-	-	6	-	-	-	-	6
28	Mark Buik	54	ADRAD Radiators	-	-	-	-	-	-	-	-	-	0
