= New Zealand Formula Pacific Championship =

Motorsport series

- Category: Open-wheeler
- Country: New Zealand
- Inaugural season: 1977
- Folded: 1993
- Last Drivers' champion: (New Zealand) Craig Baird

The New Zealand Formula Pacific Championship (NZFPC) was a motor racing series that utilised Formula Pacific racing cars. The championship was contested from 1977 to 1993 over the New Zealand summer period. The series proved attractive to international drivers who were seeking to remain race-fit over what was typically the off-season for the majority of the motor racing world. This included 1982 Formula One World Champion, Keke Rosberg, as well as other future Formula One drivers such as Teo Fabi, Roberto Moreno, Allen Berg, Mike Thackwell and Jos Verstappen. The category would also be used for the running of the annual New Zealand Grand Prix event.

The series folded at the end of the 1993 season as the Formula Brabham category would be adopted in its place. The revised formula would only last for a couple more years, folding at the end of 1995.

== Champions ==
Year	Driver	Car
1977	(Finland) Keke Rosberg	Chevron B34
1978	(Finland) Keke Rosberg	Chevron B39
1979	(Italy) Teo Fabi	March 782
1980	(New Zealand) Dave McMillan	Ralt RT1
1981	(New Zealand) David Oxton	Ralt RT4/80
1982	(Brazil) Roberto Moreno	Ralt RT4/82
1983	(Canada) Allen Berg	Ralt RT4/82
1984	(New Zealand) Ken Smith	Ralt RT4/81
1985	(United States) Ross Cheever	Ralt RT4/85
1986	(United States) Jeff MacPherson	Ralt RT4/86
1987	(New Zealand) Mike Thackwell	Ralt RT4/86
1988	(New Zealand) Paul Radisich	
1989	(United States) Dean Hall	
1990	(New Zealand) Ken Smith	
1991	(New Zealand) Craig Baird	
1992	(New Zealand) Craig Baird	
1993	(New Zealand) Craig Baird	
