= 2015–16 NZ Touring Cars Championship =

The 2015–16 NZ Touring Cars Cars Championship is the seventeenth season of the series, and the first under the NZ Touring Cars name. The field comprises two classes racing on the same grid. Class one features both V8ST and NZV8 TLX cars, while class two consists of older NZV8 TL cars.

Seven events will be played as competition in the 2015-16 season.

== Race calendar ==
Rnd	Circuit	Date	Map
2015			2015–16 NZ Touring Cars Championship is located in New Zealand
1	Taupo Motorsport Park (Taupō, Waikato)	17–18 October	2015–16 NZ Touring Cars Championship is located in New Zealand
2	Pukekohe Park Raceway (Pukekohe, Auckland Region)	6–7 November	2015–16 NZ Touring Cars Championship is located in New Zealand
3	Hampton Downs Motorsport Park (Hampton Downs, Waikato)	28–29 November	2015–16 NZ Touring Cars Championship is located in New Zealand
2016			2015–16 NZ Touring Cars Championship is located in New Zealand
4	Mike Pero Motorsport Park (Christchurch, Canterbury Region)	16–17 January	2015–16 NZ Touring Cars Championship is located in New Zealand
5	Teretonga Park (Invercargill, Southland Region)	23–24 January	2015–16 NZ Touring Cars Championship is located in New Zealand
6	Manfeild Autocourse (Feilding, Manawatū District)	12–14 February	2015–16 NZ Touring Cars Championship is located in New Zealand
7	Pukekohe Park Raceway (Pukekohe, Auckland Region)	16–17 April	2015–16 NZ Touring Cars Championship is located in New Zealand

== Teams and drivers ==
Class One
Manufacturer	Vehicle	Team	Type	No.	Driver	Events
Ford	Falcon (FG)	Varney Motorsport	NZST	14	(New Zealand) Gene Rollinson	1
Ford	Falcon (FG)	Cunningham Racing	NZST	32	(New Zealand) Mitch Cunningham	1-6
Holden	Commodore (VE)	Angus Fogg Racing	NZST	3	(New Zealand) Angus Fogg	1-6
Holden	Commodore (VE)	Team 4	NZST	4	(New Zealand) Simon Evans	1-6
Holden	Commodore (VE)	Edgell Performance Racing	NZST	8	(New Zealand) Tim Edgell	1-6
Holden	Commodore (VE)		NZST	10	(New Zealand) Andy Higgins	2
Holden	Commodore (VE)	M3 Racing	NZST	10	(New Zealand) Richard Moore	3
Holden	Commodore (VE)	Hamilton Motorsports	TLX	11	(New Zealand) Tom Alexander	1-6
Holden	Commodore (VE)	Hamilton Motorsports	TLX	84	(New Zealand) Lance Hughes	1-4
Holden	Commodore (VE)	Team Kiwi Racing	NZST	021	(New Zealand) Craig Baird	1-2
Holden	Commodore (VE)	Andre Heimgartner Racing	NZST	022	(New Zealand) Andre Heimgartner	4-6
Holden	Commodore (VE)		NZST	22	(Australia) Bryce Fullwood	1-3
Holden	Commodore (VE)		NZST	50	(New Zealand) Blair McDonald	1-3
Holden	Commodore (VE)		TLX	51	(New Zealand) James McLaughlin	1
Nissan	Altima (L33)	Concept Motorsport	TLX	007	(New Zealand) Nick Ross	1-6
Toyota	Camry (XV50)	Richards Team Motorsport	TLX	71	(New Zealand) Sam Barry	7
Toyota	Camry (XV50)	Richards Team Motorsport	TLX	97	(Australia) Jason Bargwanna	1-6
Toyota	Camry (XV50)	Richards Team Motorsport	TLX	222	(Australia) Scott Taylor	1-5
Class Two
Manufacturer	Vehicle	Team	Type	No.	Driver	Events
Ford	Falcon (BF)		TL	46	(New Zealand) Simon Fleming	1-6
Ford	Falcon (BF)	Liam MacDonald Racing	TL	69	(New Zealand) Liam MacDonald	2, 4-5
Ford	Falcon (BF)		TL	71	(New Zealand) Sam Barry	4, 6
Ford	Falcon (BF)	Brad Lathrope Racing	TL	73	(New Zealand) Brad Lathrope	1-6
Ford	Falcon (BF)	Brock Cooley Motorsport	TL	111	(New Zealand) Brock Cooley	1-6
Ford	Falcon (BF)		TL	332	(New Zealand) Tony Anderson	
Holden	Commodore (VY)	Bronson Porter Racing	TL	40	(New Zealand) Bronson Porter	6
Holden	Commodore (VY)	Nathan Pilcher Racing	TL	55	(New Zealand) Nathan Pilcher	2-5
Holden	Commodore (VY)		TL	63	(New Zealand) Ian Clapperton	5
Holden	Commodore (VY)	Kevin Williams Racing	TL	88	(New Zealand) Kevin Williams	1-3
Holden	Commodore (VY)	Team Kiwi Racing	TL	777	(New Zealand) Alyssa Clapperton	1-2, 4-6

== Results and standings ==
=== Season summary ===
Round 2 was held in support of the 2015 ITM 500 Auckland while Round 6 was in support of the 2016 New Zealand Grand Prix.

Rnd		Circuit	Pole position	Fastest lap	Class 1 Winner	Class 2 Winner
2015
1	R1	Taupo Motorsport Park	(New Zealand) Tim Edgell	(New Zealand) Simon Evans	(Australia) Jason Bargwanna	(New Zealand) Tony Anderson
1	R2	Taupo Motorsport Park		(New Zealand) Simon Evans	(New Zealand) Simon Evans	(New Zealand) Kevin Williams
1	R3	Taupo Motorsport Park		(New Zealand) Simon Evans	(New Zealand) Craig Baird	(New Zealand) Brock Cooley
2	R1	Pukekohe Park Raceway	(New Zealand) Simon Evans	(New Zealand) Simon Evans	(New Zealand) Simon Evans	(New Zealand) Kevin Williams
2	R2	Pukekohe Park Raceway		(New Zealand) Simon Evans	(New Zealand) Simon Evans	(New Zealand) Kevin Williams
2	R3	Pukekohe Park Raceway		(New Zealand) Simon Evans	(New Zealand) Craig Baird	(New Zealand) Kevin Williams
3	R1	Hampton Downs Motorsport Park	(New Zealand) Simon Evans	(Australia) Bryce Fullwood	(Australia) Jason Bargwanna	(New Zealand) Brock Cooley
3	R2	Hampton Downs Motorsport Park		(New Zealand) Simon Evans	(New Zealand) Simon Evans	(New Zealand) Brock Cooley
3	R3	Hampton Downs Motorsport Park		(New Zealand) Simon Evans	(New Zealand) Simon Evans	(New Zealand) Kevin Williams
2016
4	R1	Mike Pero Motorsport Park	(New Zealand) Andre Heimgartner	(New Zealand) Andre Heimgartner	(New Zealand) Andre Heimgartner	(New Zealand) Sam Barry
4	R2	Mike Pero Motorsport Park		(New Zealand) Andre Heimgartner	(New Zealand) Andre Heimgartner	(New Zealand) Liam MacDonald
4	R3	Mike Pero Motorsport Park		(New Zealand) Andre Heimgartner	(New Zealand) Simon Evans	(New Zealand) Brock Cooley
5	R1	Teretonga Park	(New Zealand) Andre Heimgartner	(New Zealand) Andre Heimgartner	(New Zealand) Andre Heimgartner	(New Zealand) Liam MacDonald
5	R2	Teretonga Park		(New Zealand) Andre Heimgartner	(New Zealand) Andre Heimgartner	(New Zealand) Brock Cooley
5	R3	Teretonga Park		(New Zealand) Andre Heimgartner	(New Zealand) Angus Fogg	(New Zealand) Brock Cooley
6	R1	Manfeild Autocourse	(New Zealand) Simon Evans	(New Zealand) Simon Evans	(New Zealand) Simon Evans	(New Zealand) Sam Barry
6	R2	Manfeild Autocourse		(New Zealand) Andre Heimgartner	(New Zealand) Simon Evans	(New Zealand) Sam Barry
6	R3	Manfeild Autocourse		(New Zealand) Andre Heimgartner	(New Zealand) Andre Heimgartner	(New Zealand) Brock Cooley
7	R1	Pukekohe Park Raceway	(New Zealand) Simon Evans	(New Zealand) Simon Evans	(New Zealand) Simon Evans	(New Zealand) Brock Cooley
7	R2	Pukekohe Park Raceway		(New Zealand) Simon Evans	(New Zealand) Simon Evans	(New Zealand) Brad Lathrope
7	R3	Pukekohe Park Raceway		(New Zealand) Mitch Cunningham	(New Zealand) Nick Ross	(New Zealand) Brock Cooley

=== Championship standings ===
Pos.	Driver	TAU			PUK1			HAM			RUA			TER			MAN			PUK1			Pts
Pos.	Driver	R1	R2	R3	R1	R2	R3	R1	R2	R3	R1	R2	R3	R1	R2	R3	R1	R2	R3	R1	R2	R3	Pts
1	(New Zealand) Simon Evans																						1372
2	(New Zealand) Tim Edgell																						1073
3	(New Zealand) Mitch Cunningham																						1067
4	(Australia) Jason Bargwanna																						939
5	(New Zealand) Tom Alexander																						865
6	(New Zealand) Nick Ross																						775
7	(New Zealand) Angus Fogg																						691
8	(New Zealand) Andre Heimgartner																						643
9	(Australia) Bryce Fullwood																						407
10	(Australia) Scott Taylor																						399
11	(New Zealand) Blair McDonald																						344
12	(New Zealand) Lance Hughes																						315
13	(New Zealand) Craig Baird																						253
14	(New Zealand) Richard Moore																						194
15	(New Zealand) Sam Barry																						163
16	(New Zealand) Gene Rollinson																						136
17	(New Zealand) Tony Anderson																						87
18	(New Zealand) John Midgley																						81
19	(New Zealand) Andrew Higgins																						72
20	(New Zealand) James McLaughlin																						0
21	(New Zealand) Simon Richards																						0
Pos.	Driver	R1	R2	R3	R1	R2	R3	R1	R2	R3	R1	R2	R3	R1	R2	R3	R1	R2	R3	R1	R2	R3	Pts
Pos.	Driver	TAU			PUK1			HAM			RUA			TER			MAN			PUK1			Pts

=== Class Two standings ===
Pos.	Driver	TAU			PUK1			HAM			RUA			TER			MAN			PUK1			Pts
Pos.	Driver	R1	R2	R3	R1	R2	R3	R1	R2	R3	R1	R2	R3	R1	R2	R3	R1	R2	R3	R1	R2	R3	Pts
1	(New Zealand) Brock Cooley																						1407
2	(New Zealand) Brad Lathrope																						1165
3	(New Zealand) Simon Fleming																						892
4	(New Zealand) Kevin Williams																						584
5	(New Zealand) Alyssa Clapperton																						571
6	(New Zealand) Nathan Pilcher																						496
7	(New Zealand) Liam MacDonald																						471
8	(New Zealand) Sam Barry																						292
9	(New Zealand) Steve Taylor																						168
10	(New Zealand) Bronson Porter																						148
11	(New Zealand) Robert Wallace																						140
12	(New Zealand) Jamie Gaskin																						127
13	(New Zealand) Ian Clapperton																						91
14	(New Zealand) Bruce Verdon																						84
15	(New Zealand) Tony Anderson																						0
16	(New Zealand) Dave Dovey																						0
17	(New Zealand) Michael Starnes																						0
18	(New Zealand) Nikolas Haden																						0
Pos.	Driver	R1	R2	R3	R1	R2	R3	R1	R2	R3	R1	R2	R3	R1	R2	R3	R1	R2	R3	R1	R2	R3	Pts
Pos.	Driver	TAU			PUK1			HAM			RUA			TER			MAN			PUK1			Pts
