= Paul Radisich =

New Zealand racing driver (born 1962)

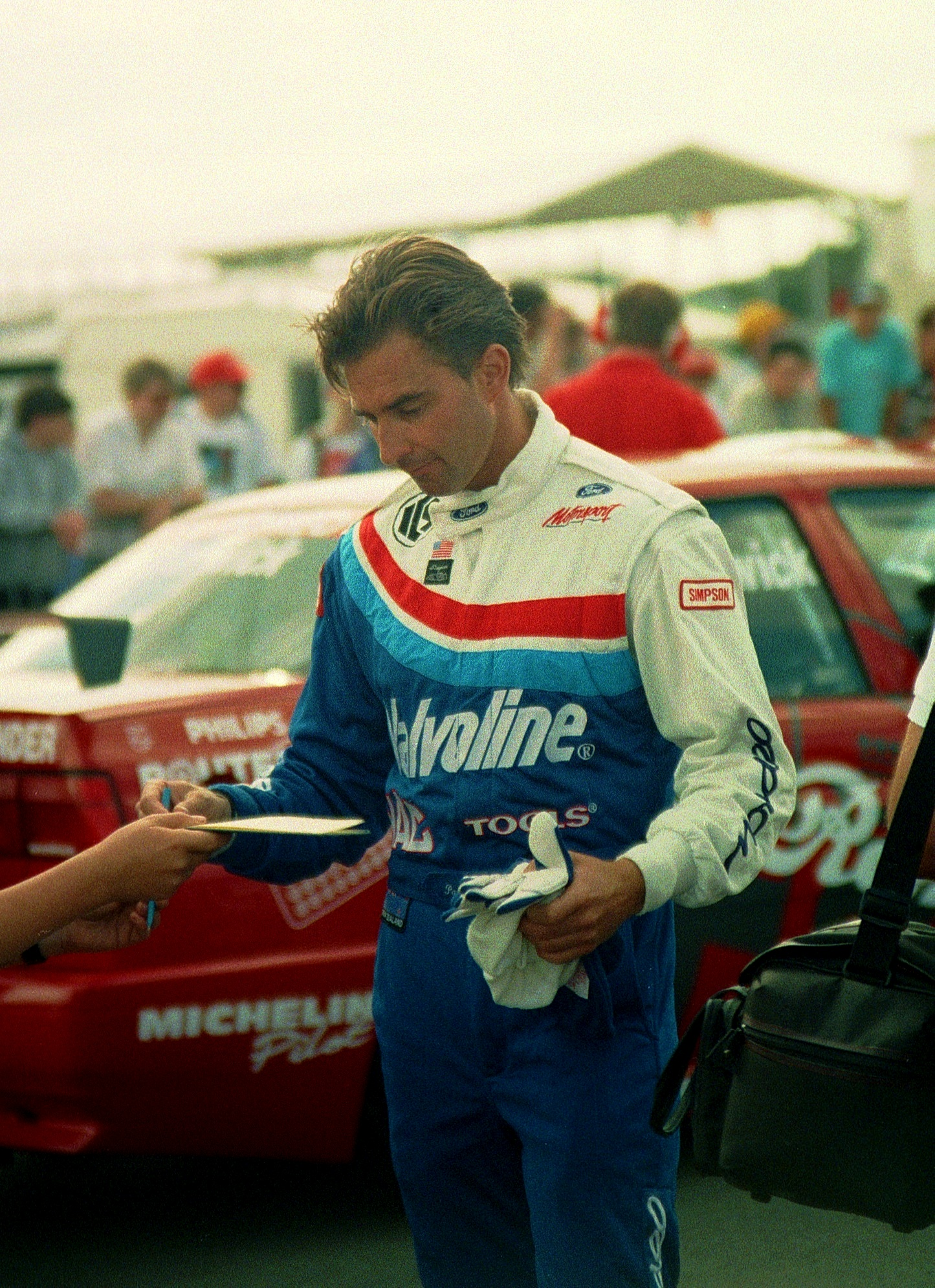
- Radisich in 1995
- Nationality: (New Zealand) New Zealander
- Born: Paul Francis Wade Radisich; 9 October 1962 (age 64) Auckland, New Zealand
- Retired: 2008
- Relatives: Frank Radisich (father); Matthew Radisich (nephew)

V8 Supercar
- Years active: 1999-2008
- Teams: Dick Johnson Racing; Briggs Motor Sport; Triple Eight Race Engineering; Team Kiwi Racing; HSV Dealer Team
- Starts: 106
- Wins: 4
- Best finish: 4th in 2000 Shell Championship Series

Previous series
- 1982-90 1982-84 1984 & 86 1987-88 1991 1993-98 1995 2002-08: New Zealand Formula Pacific; Australian Drivers' Champ. British Formula 3 Formula Super Vee; US Formula Atlantic; British Touring Cars; South Africa Touring Cars; New Zealand V8s

Championship titles
- 1988 1988 1993 1994: New Zealand Grand Prix; New Zealand Formula Pacific; Touring Car World Cup; Touring Car World Cup

Paul Francis Wade Radisich (born 9 October 1962) is a retired New Zealand racing driver and businessman of Croat origin. He has competed in saloon cars for many years — both European-style tourers and the V8 Supercars of Australia and New Zealand.

== Early years ==
In 1983, Radisich was Formula Atlantic runner-up, earning the prestigious Driver To Europe award. In 1985 and 1986, he raced in British Formula 3, alongside Damon Hill. He later raced in Indy Lights and Formula Super Vee with some success, before finishing second in the 1990 Bathurst 1000. This led him towards racing saloon cars full-time.

== European Touring Cars ==
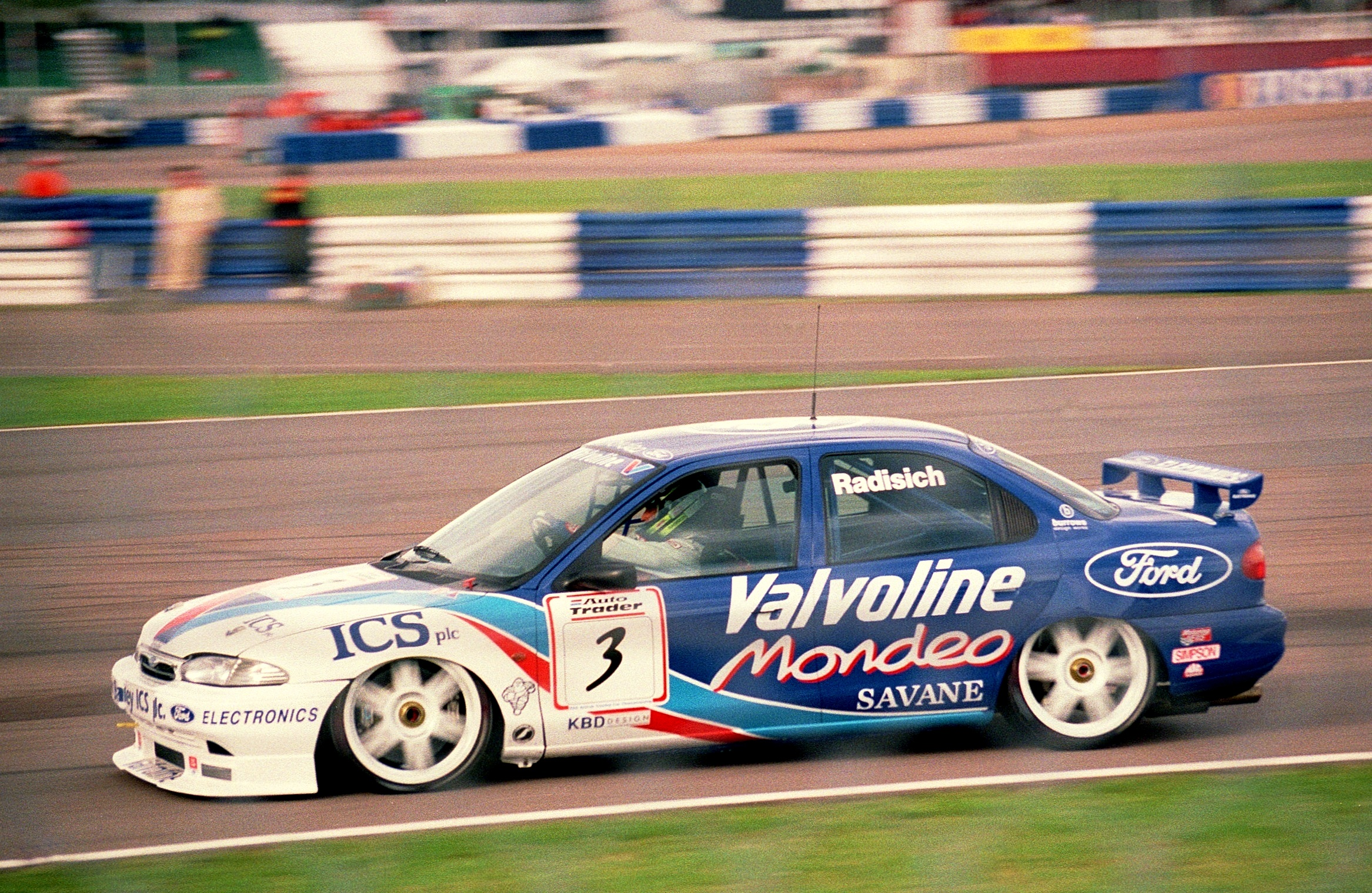
Radisich driving for Ford at Silverstone during the 1995 British Touring Car Championship season.

Radisich won the 1993 and 1994 Touring Car World Cup events at Monza and at Donington respectively. 1993 was his first British Touring Car Championship (BTCC) season, in a Ford Mondeo prepared by Andy Rouse. He finished third in the series despite only competing in half the year. He would again drive for Andy Rouse in 1994 where he finished third again behind Gabriele Tarquini for Alfa Romeo and Alain Menu for Renault. Radisich would again drive for Andy Rouse in 1995, but by the end of the 1995 season, the car had reached the end of its development cycle and was increasingly uncompetitive during the end of the 1995 season and in the 1996 season when West Surrey Racing took over the Ford team from Andy Rouse. 1996 would be a disappointment for the Ford team with no podium places and Radisich finishing 13th in the championship. 1997 would see a new Mondeo however it too was uncompetitive, and would not challenge the front running teams. In 1998, he raced for Peugeot where he again had a disappointing season. He left the series and went to race for Dick Johnson Racing in the V8 Supercar series in Australia.

At the end of the 2004 season, Radisich entered the BTCC Masters event at Donington, and was considering a comeback to the BTCC the following year, but he instead chose to continue his racing career down under.

== V8 Supercars ==
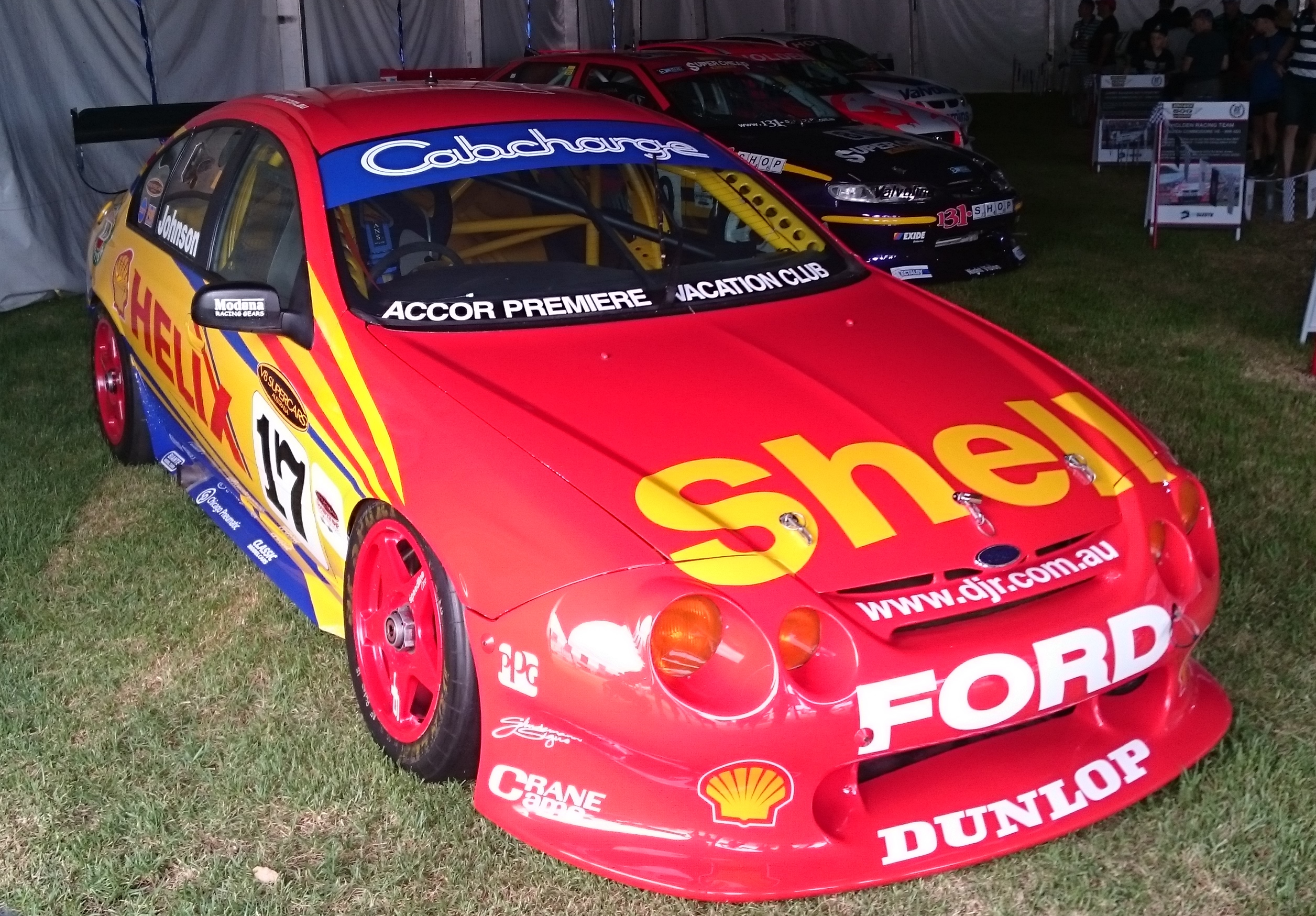
The Ford Falcon AU with which Radisich and Steven Johnson won the 2001 Queensland 500. The car is pictured in 2018

In 1999, Radisich joined Dick Johnson Racing replacing the departed John Bowe. He remained with Dick Johnson Racing until the end of 2002. In 2003, he joined Briggs Motor Sport which was later sold to British outfit Triple Eight Race Engineering in 2004. In total, he has four race wins and eight other podium results in the championship.

=== Team Kiwi Racing ===
Radisich surprised a lot of people by signing for the patriotic Team Kiwi Racing for two years in 2005 racing in a Holden for the first time, helping the team to their first ever podium finish at Shanghai International Circuit in China, (third). He finished the 2005 season in 14th place, TKR's highest ever finish in a Supercar season.

In the 2006 Supercheap Auto 1000 endurance race at Mount Panorama, Radisich had a major crash at around 200 km/h in The Chase. While attempting to overtake Nathan Pretty he ran wide into the dirt and could not brake in time and careered into a tyre wall head on, flipping the car onto its side. Rescue teams had to cut the roof off the car in order to get him out. He was then taken to a nearby hospital and then flown to a hospital in Sydney for further scans. He broke his ankle and sternum in the crash and missed the remainder of the season.

In November 2006, it was confirmed that Radisich had signed for a further two years with TKR and would once again be back racing in a Ford for 2007–08. He has commented that he had unfinished business in V8 Supercars.

Radisich returned to the cockpit at Barbagallo for the first time since Bathurst, to the delight of many fans. He had a very good result at Pukekohe, the final round to be held at that circuit, finishing 7th in the third race.

Ford Performance Racing terminated its contract to supply and service the TKR Falcon on 31 May 2007. Radisich said he had terminated his contract with TKR following the team's fallout with Ford Performance Racing that ran the car on behalf of TKR. "TKR is in breach of contract and I have therefore terminated my contract with immediate effect."

=== Toll HSV Dealer Team ===
The New Zealand international joined fellow Kiwi Craig Baird and regular drivers Rick Kelly and Garth Tander in the Toll HSV ranks for the big endurance races in September and October.

The formal announcement was put on hold until Carrera Cup star and Bathurst rookie David Reynolds was signed and sealed with Super Cheap Auto Racing for the enduros. Reynolds had been in line for a drive with Toll HSV in the big races in September and October, but was happy to transfer to Super Cheap for his V8 Supercar debut without the potential pressure of a fellow drivers championship hanging over him.

At Sandown, Radisich was paired with Championship front-runner, Rick Kelly. The car was qualified by Kelly, and they started from eighth position on the grid. Radisich and Kelly drove the Number 1 Toll HSV Commodore to second place, 2.8 seconds behind Triple Eight Racing's Craig Lowndes and Jamie Whincup.

At Bathurst, Radisich was paired with Craig Baird. After qualifying 9th after the top-10 shootout, Radisich and Craig Baird started strongly, and were running on the fringe of the top-ten for the majority of the race, slowed by persistent braking problems which also afflicted their more illustrious team-mates. Ultimately, the team withdrew from the race on lap 137 of 161 so as not to risk damaging Tander and Kelly's race cars for the championship battle to come.

=== Retirement and later career ===
Returning to the team in 2008, Radisich crashed heavily during practice for the 2008 Bathurst 1000, after the throttle jammed open at McPhillamy Park Corner, hitting the concrete wall in a gap in the tyre barriers. Radisich fractured both ankles, reopened the fractured sternum sustained in an accident two years prior, fractured lumbar and thoracic vertebrae, cracked ribs and suffered bruising to his lungs. His recovery has been protracted and brought an end to his motor racing career.

Radisich raced a Ford Mustang S550 in the invitational non-championship Class Three of the 2018-19 BNT V8 Championship.

Radisich was team manager of the Super Black Racing team until the team was disbanded at the end of the 2016 season. He is managing director of New Zealand oil company Aegis Oil, a company founded by his father Frank.

Radisich is the in-studio co-host of the British Touring Car Championship segment of TV3's CRC Motorsport with Shaun Summerfield.

== Career results ==
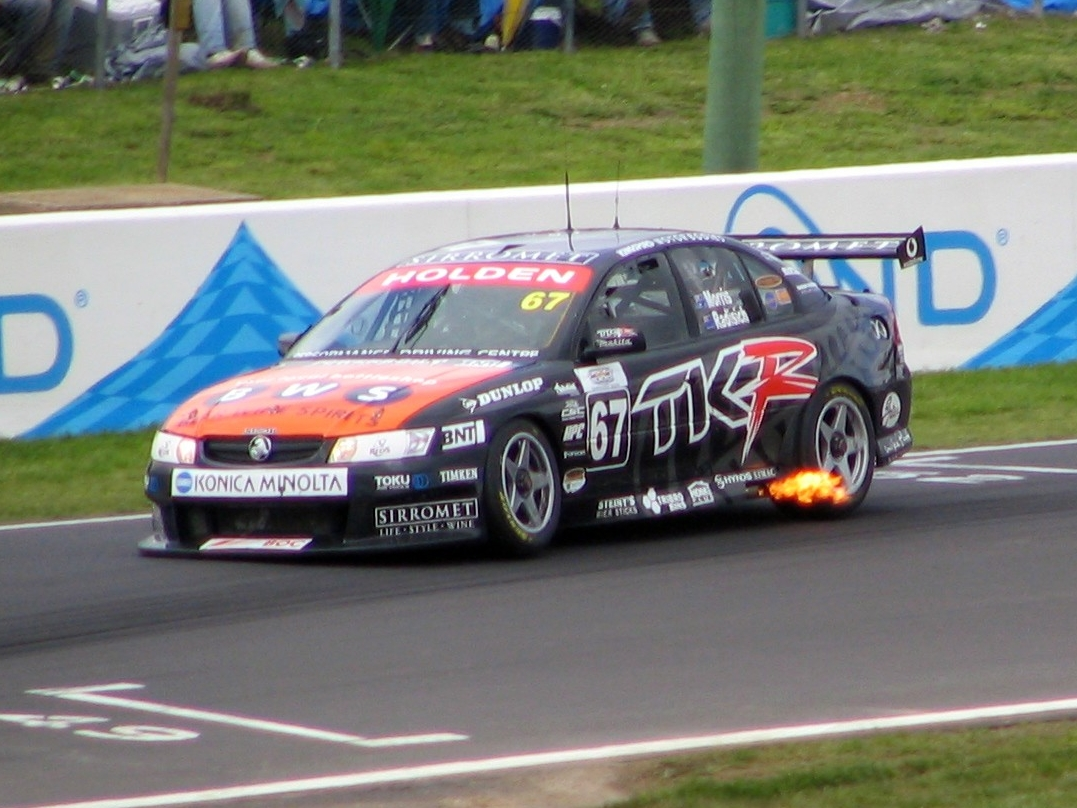
Radisich placed 14th in the 2005 V8 Supercar Championship Series

Season	Series	Position	Car	Team
1982	Australian Drivers' Championship	12th	Ralt RT4 Ford	Paul Radisich
1983	Australian Drivers' Championship	4th	Ralt RT4 Ford	Watson Motor Racing Pty Ltd
1984	British Formula 3 Championship	12th	Ralt RT3 Golf	Murray Taylor Racing
1986	British Formula 3 Championship	16th	Ralt RT30 Golf	Murray Taylor Racing
1987	American Racing Series	17th	Wildcat - Buick	Agapiou Racing
1987/88	New Zealand Gold Star Championship	1st	Ralt RT4	
1988	SCCA Valvoline/Bosch/VW Super Vee Championship	4th	Ralt RT5	Ralt of America, Dave Conti Racing
1990	Australian Endurance Championship	13th	Ford Sierra RS500	Shell Ultra Hi Racing
1991	Formula Toyota Atlantic Championship	20th	Reynard 91H Toyota	
1993	British Touring Car Championship	3rd	Ford Mondeo	Rousesport
1994	British Touring Car Championship	3rd	Ford Mondeo	Rousesport
1995	British Touring Car Championship	6th	Ford Mondeo	Rousesport
1996	British Touring Car Championship	13th	Ford Mondeo	West Surrey Racing
1997	British Touring Car Championship	13th	Ford Mondeo	West Surrey Racing
1998	British Touring Car Championship	14th	Peugeot 406	Motor Sport Developments
1999	Shell Championship Series	16th	Ford AU Falcon	Dick Johnson Racing
2000	Shell Championship Series	4th	Ford AU Falcon	Dick Johnson Racing
2001	Shell Championship Series	7th	Ford AU Falcon	Dick Johnson Racing
2002	V8 Supercar Championship Series	26th	Ford AU Falcon	Dick Johnson Racing
2003	V8 Supercar Championship Series	10th	Ford BA Falcon	Briggs Motor Sport
2004	V8 Supercar Championship Series	19th	Ford BA Falcon	Triple Eight Race Engineering
2005	V8 Supercar Championship Series	14th	Holden VZ Commodore	Team Kiwi Racing
2006	V8 Supercar Championship Series	28th	Holden VZ Commodore	Team Kiwi Racing
2007	V8 Supercar Championship Series	20th	Ford BF Falcon; Holden VE Commodore	Team Kiwi Racing; Toll HSV Dealer Team
2008	V8 Supercar Championship Series	47th	Holden VE Commodore	HSV Dealer Team

=== Complete World Touring Car Championship results ===
(key) (Races in bold indicate pole position) (Races in italics indicate fastest lap)

Year	Team	Car	1	2	3	4	5	6	7	8	9	10	11	DC	Pts
1987	(New Zealand) Bryce Racing BMW	BMW 325i	MNZ	JAR	DIJ	NÜR	SPA	BNO	SIL	BAT	CLD	WEL ovr:10 cls:4†	FJI	NC	0

† Not eligible for points.

=== Complete Asia-Pacific Touring Car Championship results ===
(key) (Races in bold indicate pole position) (Races in italics indicate fastest lap)

Year	Team	Car	1	2	3	4	DC	Points
1988	(New Zealand) Bill Bryce Racing	BMW M3	BAT; NC	WEL; Ret	PUK; Ret	FJI	NC	0

=== Complete British Touring Car Championship results ===
(key) (Races in bold indicate pole position - 1 point awarded all races 1996 onwards) (Races in italics indicate fastest lap) (* signifies that driver lead feature race for at least one lap - 1 point awarded 1998 only)

Year	Team	Car	Class	1	2	3	4	5	6	7	8	9	10	11	12	13	14	15	16	17	18	19	20	21	22	23	24	25	26	DC	Pts	Class
1990	Labatt's Team	Ford Sierra RS500	A	OUL	DON	THR	SIL	OUL	SIL	BRH; Ret‡	SNE	BRH	BIR	DON	THR	SIL														NC	0	NC
1993	Team Mondeo	Ford Mondeo Si		SIL	DON	SNE	DON	OUL	BRH; 1	BRH; 2	PEM; 8	SIL; 3	KNO; 1; 5	KNO; 2; 5	OUL; Ret	BRH; 1	THR; 2	**DON**; **1**; 1	**DON**; **2**; 2	**SIL**; 1										3rd	110	
1994	Team Mondeo	Ford Mondeo Ghia		THR; Ret	BRH; 1; 5	BRH; 2; 4	SNE; 2	SIL; 1; 2	SIL; 2; 1	OUL; 2	**DON**; **1**; 2	DON; 2; 2	BRH; 1 Ret	BRH; 2 Ret	SIL; 3	**KNO**; **1**; 2	KNO; 2; 2	OUL; Ret	BRH; 1; 14	BRH; 2 DSQ	SIL; 1 Ret	SIL; 2 DNS	DON; 1; 1	**DON**; **2**; 9						3rd	206	
1995	Valvoline Team Mondeo	Ford Mondeo Ghia		DON; 1; 3	DON; 2; 6	BRH; 1; 2	BRH; 2 DNS	THR; 1 Ret	THR; 2; 6	SIL; 1; 2	SIL; 2; 1	OUL; 1 Ret	OUL; 2; 5	BRH; 1 Ret	BRH; 2; 7	DON; 1; 5	DON; 2; 2	SIL; 6	KNO; 1 Ret	KNO; 2 Ret	BRH; 1; 14	BRH; 2 Ret	SNE; 1; 9	SNE; 2 Ret	OUL; 1 Ret	OUL; 2; 12	SIL; 1; 18	SIL; 2; 12		6th	130	
1996	Valvoline Team Mondeo	Ford Mondeo		DON; 1 Ret	DON; 2; 8	BRH; 1; 5	BRH; 2; 8	THR; 1 Ret	THR; 2 Ret	SIL; 1 Ret	SIL; 2; 7	OUL; 1 Ret	OUL; 2 Ret	SNE; 1 Ret	SNE; 2; 8	BRH; 1 Ret	BRH; 2; 11	SIL; 1 Ret	SIL; 2; 9	KNO; 1; 7	KNO; 2; 9	OUL; 1 Ret	OUL; 2; 11	THR; 1 Ret	THR; 2 Ret	DON; 1; 17	DON; 2; 11	BRH; 1 Ret	BRH; 2 Ret	13th	27	
1997	Team Mondeo	Ford Mondeo		DON; 1; 6	DON; 2; 7	SIL; 1 Ret	SIL; 2 Ret	THR; 1; 10	THR; 2; 10	BRH; 1 Ret	BRH; 2; 7	OUL; 1; 8	OUL; 2; 7	DON; 1 Ret	DON; 2 Ret	CRO; 1 Ret	CRO; 2; 11	KNO; 1 Ret	KNO; 2 Ret	SNE; 1; 6	SNE; 2 Ret	THR; 1; 14	THR; 2; 12	BRH; 1 Ret	BRH; 2; 4	SIL; 1; 10	SIL; 2; 5			13th	41	
1998	Esso Ultron Team Peugeot	Peugeot 406		THR; 1 Ret	THR; 2; 8	SIL; 1; 12	SIL; 2; 4	DON; 1; 11	DON; 2 Ret	BRH; 1; 8	BRH; 2; 12	OUL; 1; 12	OUL; 2; 13	DON; 1; 10	DON; 2 Ret	CRO; 1; 11	CRO; 2 Ret	SNE; 1; 18	SNE; 2; 10	THR; 1; 9	THR; 2 Ret	KNO; 1; 10	KNO; 2; 6	BRH; 1; 10	BRH; 2; 10	OUL; 1 Ret	OUL; 2 Ret	SIL; 1; 6	SIL; 2; 14	14th	31	

† Not eligible for points due to being an endurance driver.

‡ Endurance driver.

=== Complete Japanese Touring Car Championship results ===
(key) (Races in bold indicate pole position) (Races in italics indicate fastest lap)

Year	Team	Car	Class	1	2	3	4	5	6	7	8	DC	Pts
1992	Autotech Racing Team	BMW M3 Sport Evolution	JTC-2	AID	AUT	SUG	SUZ	MIN	TSU; 23	SEN	FUJ; 7	18th	23

=== Complete V8 Supercar Championship results ===
Supercars results
Year	Team	Car	1	2	3	4	5	6	7	8	9	10	11	12	13	14	15	16	17	18	19	20	21	22	23	24	25	26	27	28	29	30	31	32	33	34	35	36	37	38	Position	Points
1999	Dick Johnson Racing	Ford AU Falcon	EAS; R1; Ret	EAS; R2; 15	EAS; R3; 17	ADE; R4; Ret	BAR; R5; 13	BAR; R6; 4	BAR; R7; 3	PHI; R8; 6	PHI; R9; 13	PHI; R10; Ret	HID; R11; DNS	HID; R12; 9	HID; R13; 12	SAN; R14; 4	SAN; R15; 3	SAN; R16; 4	QLD; R17; 5	QLD; R18; 5	QLD; R19; 6	CAL; R20; Ret	CAL; R21; 12	CAL; R22; 7	SYM; R23; Ret	SYM; R24; Ret	SYM; R25; WD	WIN; R26; 5	WIN; R27; 5	WIN; R28; 3	ORA; R29; 10	ORA; R30; 5	ORA; R31; 5	QLD; R32; Ret	BAT; R33; Ret						16th	812
2000	Dick Johnson Racing	Ford AU Falcon	PHI; R1; 5	PHI; R2; 6	BAR; R3; 6	BAR; R4; 5	BAR; R5; 5	ADE; R6; 5	ADE; R7; 9	EAS; R8; 4	EAS; R9; 1	EAS; R10; 26	HID; R11; Ret	HID; R12; 16	HID; R13; Ret	CAN; R14; 15	CAN; R15; 9	CAN; R16; 8	QLD; R17; 5	QLD; R18; 6	QLD; R19; Ret	WIN; R20; 7	WIN; R21; 6	WIN; R22; 2	ORA; R23; 10	ORA; R24; Ret	ORA; R25; 19	CAL; R26; 1	CAL; R27; 6	CAL; R28; 2	QLD; R29; 6	SAN; R30; 1	SAN; R31; 3	SAN; R32; 1	BAT; R33; 2						4th	1260
2001	Dick Johnson Racing	Ford AU Falcon	PHI; R1; 12	PHI; R2; 14	ADE; R3; Ret	ADE; R4; NC	EAS; R5; 5	EAS; R6; 3	HID; R7; 6	HID; R8; DNS	HID; R9; DNS	CAN; R10; 6	CAN; R11; 4	CAN; R12; 7	**BAR**; **R13**; 1	**BAR**; **R14**; 1	**BAR**; **R15**; 1	CAL; R16; 5	CAL; R17; 4	CAL; R18; 2	ORA; R19; 17	ORA; R20; 9	QLD; R21; 1	WIN; R22; 15	WIN; R23; 5	BAT; R24; Ret	PUK; R25; 17	PUK; R26; 8	PUK; R27; 19	SAN; R28; 20	SAN; R29; 6	SAN; R30; Ret									7th	2109
2002	Dick Johnson Racing	Ford AU Falcon	ADE; R1; Ret	ADE; R2; Ret	PHI; R3; 8	PHI; R4; 3	EAS; R5; 14	EAS; R6; 9	EAS; R7; 9	HDV; R8; 17	HDV; R9; 27	HDV; R10; Ret	CAN; R11; 8	CAN; R12; Ret	CAN; R13; Ret	BAR; R14; 24	BAR; R15; 16	BAR; R16; Ret	ORA; R17; 13	ORA; R18; 20	WIN; R19; 17	WIN; R20; Ret	QLD; R21; 13	BAT; R22; Ret	SUR; R23; 15	SUR; R24; 6	PUK; R25; Ret	PUK; R26; WD	PUK; R27; WD	SAN; R28; 29	SAN; R29; Ret										26th	398
2003	Briggs Motor Sport	Ford BA Falcon	ADE; R1; 12	ADE; R1; 4	PHI; R3; 12	EAS; R4; 15	WIN; R5; 7	BAR; R6; 16	BAR; R7; 13	BAR; R8; 6	HDV; R9; 5	HDV; R10; 8	HDV; R11; 23	QLD; R12; Ret	ORA; R13; Ret	SAN; R14; 7	BAT; R15; 7	SUR; R16; 11	SUR; R17; 6	PUK; R18; 5	PUK; R19; 7	PUK; R20; 8	EAS; R21; 12	EAS; R22; 7																	10th	1618
2004	Triple Eight Race Engineering	Ford BA Falcon	ADE; R1; Ret	ADE; R2; 7	EAS; R3; 20	PUK; R4; 3	PUK; R5; 16	PUK; R6; 11	HDV; R7; 9	HDV; R8; 16	HDV; R9; 25	BAR; R10; Ret	BAR; R11; Ret	BAR; R12; 29	QLD; R13; 6	WIN; R14; 19	ORA; R15; 14	ORA; R16; 13	SAN; R17; Ret	BAT; R18; Ret	SUR; R19; 12	SUR; R20; 7	SYM; R21; 9	SYM; R22; 21	SYM; R23; 14	EAS; R24; 6	EAS; R25; 2	EAS; R26; 4													19th	1188
2005	Team Kiwi Racing	Holden VZ Commodore	ADE; R1; 23	ADE; R2; 10	PUK; R3; 6	PUK; R4; 6	PUK; R5; 6	BAR; R6; 6	BAR; R7; 8	BAR; R8; Ret	EAS; R9; 32	EAS; R10; 18	SHA; R11; 6	SHA; R12; 5	SHA; R13; 3	HDV; R14; 6	HDV; R15; 8	HDV; R16; 27	QLD; R17; 29	ORA; R18; 12	ORA; R19; 9	SAN; R20; 8	BAT; R21; Ret	SUR; R22; 13	SUR; R23; 13	SUR; R24; 27	SYM; R25; 12	SYM; R26; 10	SYM; R27; 12	PHI; R28; 7	PHI; R29; 8	PHI; R30; 14									14th	1384
2006	Team Kiwi Racing	Holden VZ Commodore	ADE; R1; 23	ADE; R2; 12	PUK; R3; 21	PUK; R4; Ret	PUK; R5; 14	BAR; R6; 31	BAR; R7; 6	BAR; R8; 15	WIN; R9; 20	WIN; R10; Ret	WIN; R11; 16	HDV; R12; 18	HDV; R13; 21	HDV; R14; 11	QLD; R15; 13	QLD; R16; 13	QLD; R17; 7	ORA; R18; Ret	ORA; R19; 14	ORA; R20; 16	SAN; R21; 13	BAT; R22; Ret	SUR; R23	SUR; R24	SUR; R25	SYM; R26	SYM; R27	SYM; R28	BHR; R29	BHR; R30	BHR; R31	PHI; R32	PHI; R33	PHI; R34					28th	1235
2007	Team Kiwi Racing	Ford BF Falcon	ADE; R1	ADE; R2	BAR; R3; 16	BAR; R4; 11	BAR; R5; 22	PUK; R6; 15	PUK; R7; 10	PUK; R8; 7	WIN; R9; 24	WIN; R10; 12	WIN; R11; 13	EAS; R12	EAS; R13	EAS; R14	HDV; R15	HDV; R16	HDV; R17	QLD; R18	QLD; R19	QLD; R20	ORA; R21	ORA; R22	ORA; R23																20th	96
2007	HSV Dealer Team	Holden VE Commodore																								SAN; R24; 2	BAT; R25; Ret	SUR; R26	SUR; R27	SUR; R28	BHR; R29	BHR; R30	BHR; R31	SYM; R32	SYM; R33	SYM; R34	PHI; R35	PHI; R36	PHI; R37		20th	96
2008	HSV Dealer Team	Holden VE Commodore	ADE; R1	ADE; R2	EAS; R3	EAS; R4	EAS; R5	HAM; R6	HAM; R7	HAM; R8	BAR; R29	BAR; R10	BAR; R11	SAN; R12	SAN; R13	SAN; R14	HDV; R15	HDV; R16	HDV; R17	QLD; R18	QLD; R19	QLD; R20	WIN; R21	WIN; R22	WIN; R23	PHI; QR; 17	PHI; R24; 7	BAT; R25; DNS	SUR; R26	SUR; R27	SUR; R28	BHR; R29	BHR; R30	BHR; R31	SYM; R32	SYM; R33	SYM; R34	ORA; R35	ORA; R36	ORA; R37	47th	196

=== Complete Bathurst 1000 results ===
Year	Car#	Team	Car	Co-driver	Position	Laps
1988	55	(New Zealand) Bill Bryce Racing	BMW M3	(Germany) Ludwig Finauer	NC	113
1989	105	(Australia) Mobil 1 Racing	Ford Sierra RS500	(Australia) Brad Jones	9th	153
1990	18	(Australia) Dick Johnson Racing	Ford Sierra RS500	(United Kingdom) Jeff Allam	2nd	161
1991	18	(Australia) Dick Johnson Racing	Ford Sierra RS500	(Australia) John Bowe (Australia) Terry Shiel	DNF	152
1993	18	(Australia) Dick Johnson Racing	Ford EB Falcon	(Australia) Cameron McConville	8th	151
1994	1	(Australia) Glenn Seton Racing	Ford EB Falcon	(Australia) Glenn Seton	DNF	82
1997*	6	(United Kingdom) Esso Ultron Team Peugeot	Peugeot 406	(United Kingdom) Tim Harvey	DNF	70
1998*	2	(Australia) Brad Jones Racing	Audi A4 Quattro	(Australia) Paul Morris	DNF	84
1999	18	(Australia) Dick Johnson Racing	Ford AU Falcon	(Australia) Steve Ellery	DNF	147
2000	18	(Australia) Dick Johnson Racing	Ford AU Falcon	(Australia) Jason Bright	2nd	161
2001	17	(Australia) Dick Johnson Racing	Ford AU Falcon	(Australia) Steven Johnson	DNF	63
2002	17	(Australia) Dick Johnson Racing	Ford AU Falcon	(Australia) Steven Johnson	DNF	29
2003	65	(Australia) Triple Eight Race Engineering	Ford BA Falcon	(Sweden) Rickard Rydell	7th	161
2004	88	(Australia) Triple Eight Race Engineering	Ford BA Falcon	(Brazil) Max Wilson	DNF	116
2005	67	(Australia) Paul Morris Motorsport	Holden VZ Commodore	(Australia) Paul Morris	DNF	26
2006	021	(New Zealand) Team Kiwi Racing	Holden VZ Commodore	(New Zealand) Fabian Coulthard	DNF	71
2007	16	(Australia) HSV Dealer Team	Holden VE Commodore	(New Zealand) Craig Baird	DNF	137
2008	15	(Australia) HSV Dealer Team	Holden VE Commodore	(Australia) Rick Kelly	DNS	0

* Super Touring race

Sporting positions
Preceded by Davy Jones	Winner of the New Zealand Grand Prix; 1988	Succeeded by Dean Hall
Preceded by none	Winner of the FIA World Touring Car Cup; 1993-1994	Succeeded by Frank Biela
