= Rick Kelly =

Australian racing driver

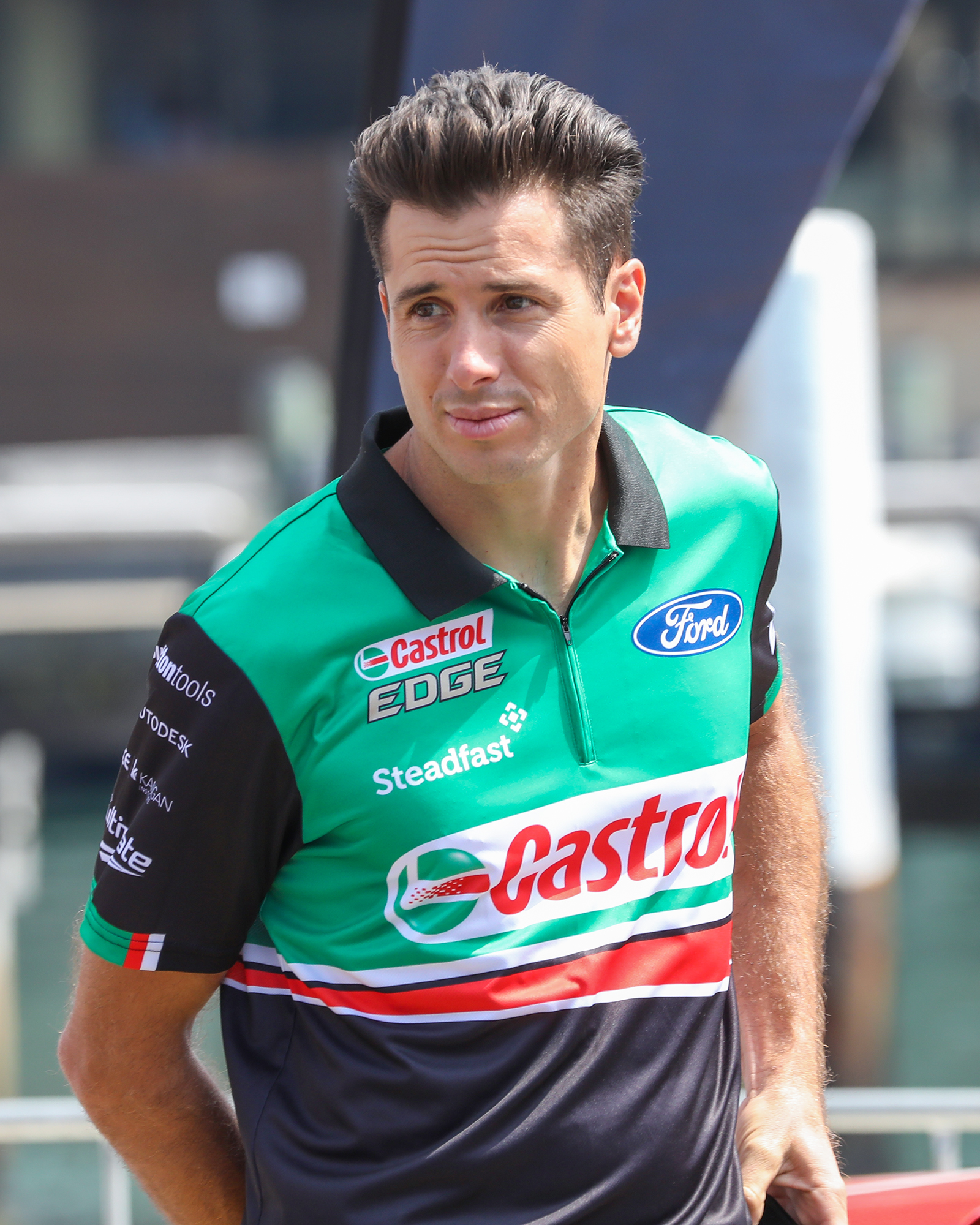
- Rick Kelly in 2020
- Nationality: Australian
- Born: 17 January 1983 (age 43) Mildura, Victoria
- Categorisation: FIA Gold

Supercars Championship career
- Championships: 1 (2006)
- Races: 580
- Wins: 15
- Podiums: 60
- Pole positions: 12

Rick Kelly (born 17 January 1983) is an Australian professional racing driver who previously competed in the Supercars Championship. He last drove the No. 15 Ford Mustang GT for Kelly Racing. Previously, he drove for the HSV Dealer Team with whom he won the Bathurst 1000 alongside Greg Murphy in 2003 and 2004. In 2006, Kelly extended his success by winning the V8 Supercar Championship for the HSV Dealer Team. His older brother Todd Kelly was also a racing driver who won the Bathurst 1000 in 2005. His parents John and Margaret Kelly formed Kelly Racing in 2009 with Rick and Todd Kelly as lead drivers, expanding to a 4 car operation.

== 2006 Supercar Championship ==
In 2006, Kelly won the Australian V8 Supercar Championship Series after being one of the most consistent performers throughout the season. The victory, however, was not without its share of controversy. Despite not winning a single round overall (though he did win an individual race), or scoring a pole position in any individual race, Kelly entered the final round of the series at Phillip Island seven points ahead of his nearest competitor, Craig Lowndes, (who had won four rounds) due to consistent high points finishes in all twelve of the previous 2006 rounds.

Coming into the third and final race of the round, Lowndes had managed to pull back the deficit to be even on points with Kelly, meaning that the driver out of the two who finished first would clinch the championship. Two laps into the final race, Kelly collided with Lowndes, who then slid into Todd Kelly. Damage to Lowndes’s car resulted in him finishing 29th, whereas Rick Kelly finished 18th and was awarded the series title despite not having won a single round.

== Charitable work ==
Kelly has joined other publicly known figures in support of the "Oscar's Law" campaign, a protest against the factory farming of companion animals. The campaign is named after a neglected dog found in central Victoria, Australia, and was launched in 2010. The list of supporters includes singers Kate Ceberano, Jon Stevens, and Sia. Kelly not only appears on the campaign's website, but he has also promoted the campaign on his Twitter account.

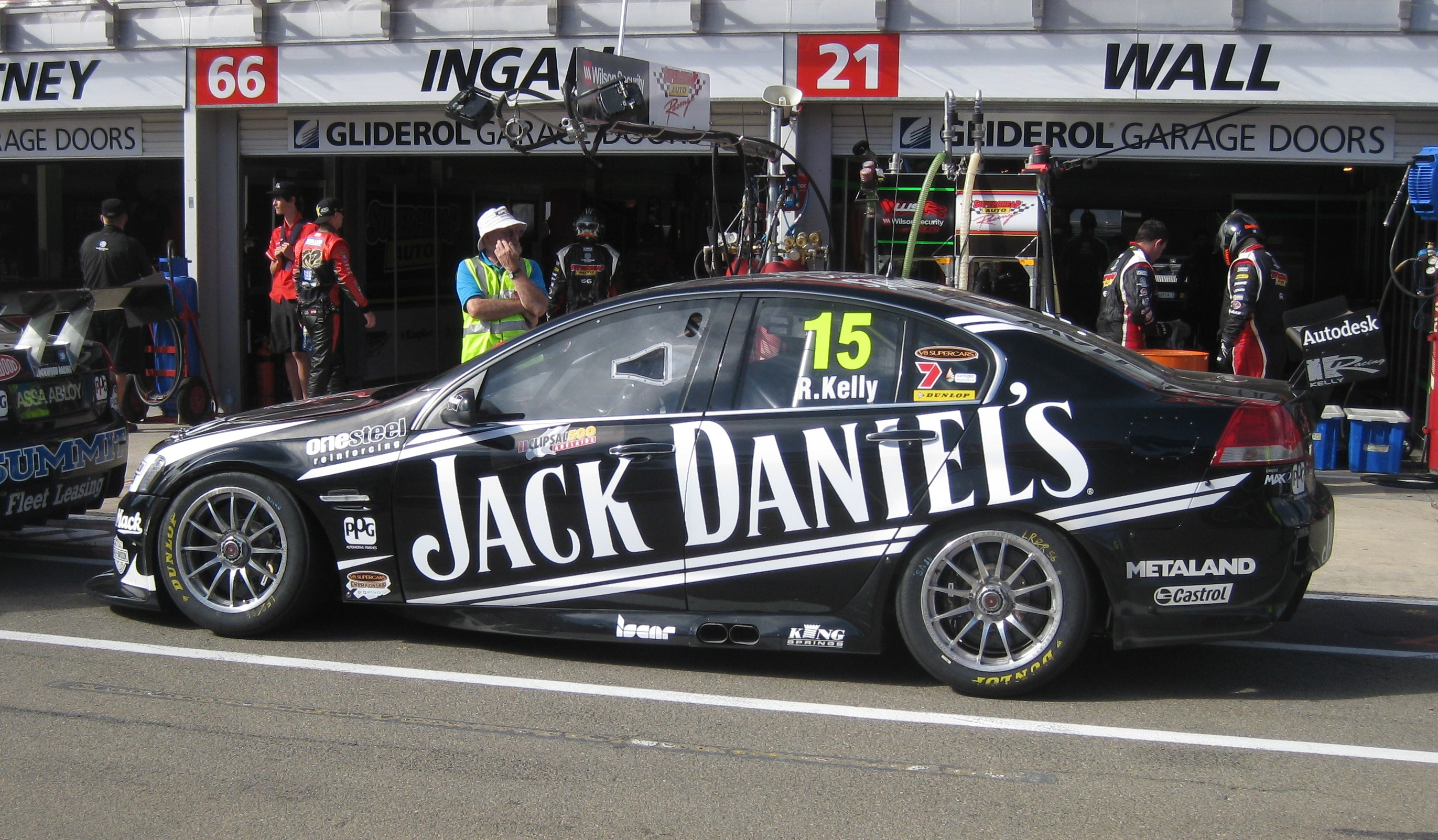
Kelly placed 14th in the 2012 V8 Supercars Championship driving a Holden VE Commodore

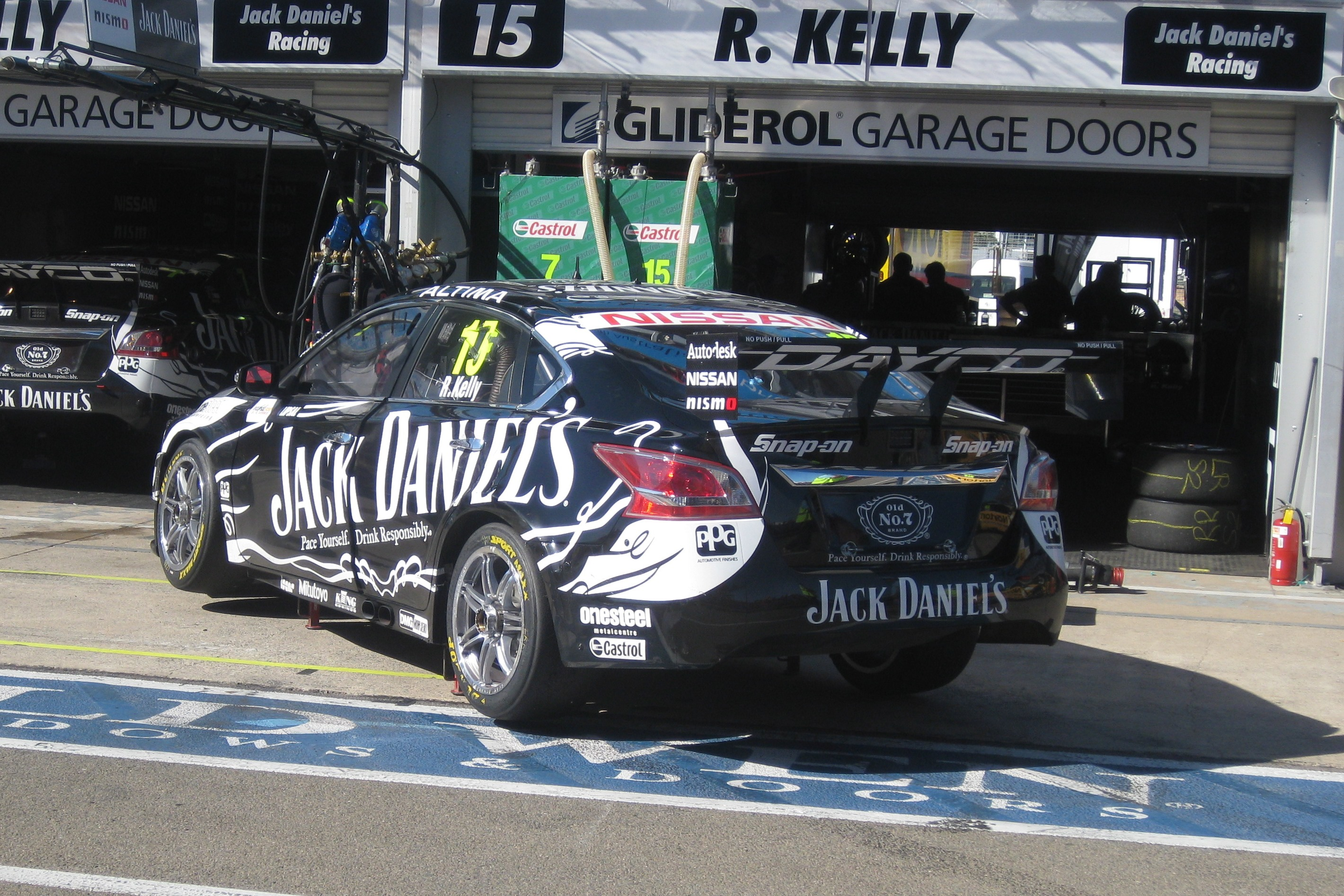
Kelly placed 14th in the 2013 V8 Supercars Championship driving a Nissan L33 Altima

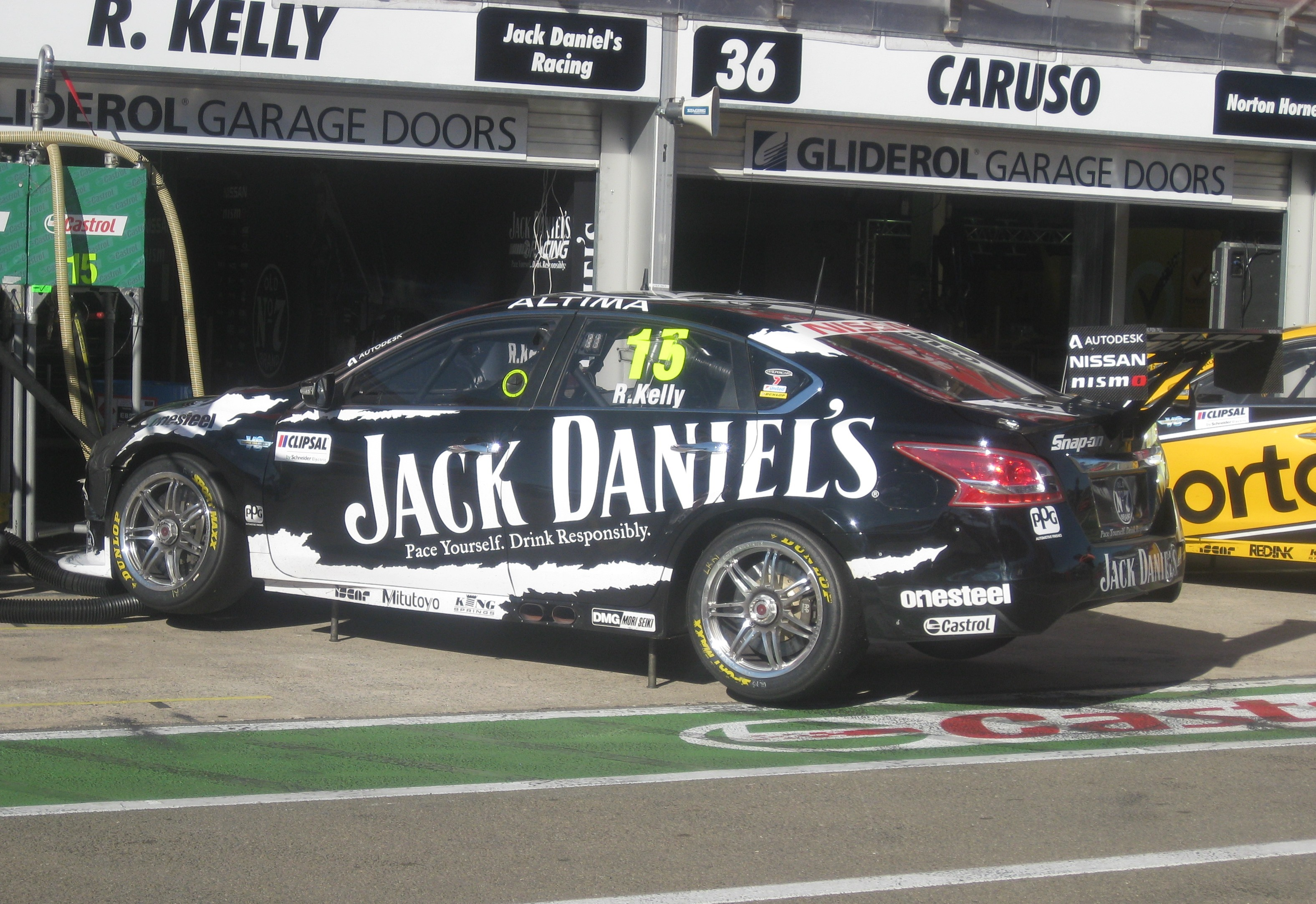
Kelly placed 13th in the 2014 V8 Supercars Championship driving a Nissan L33 Altima

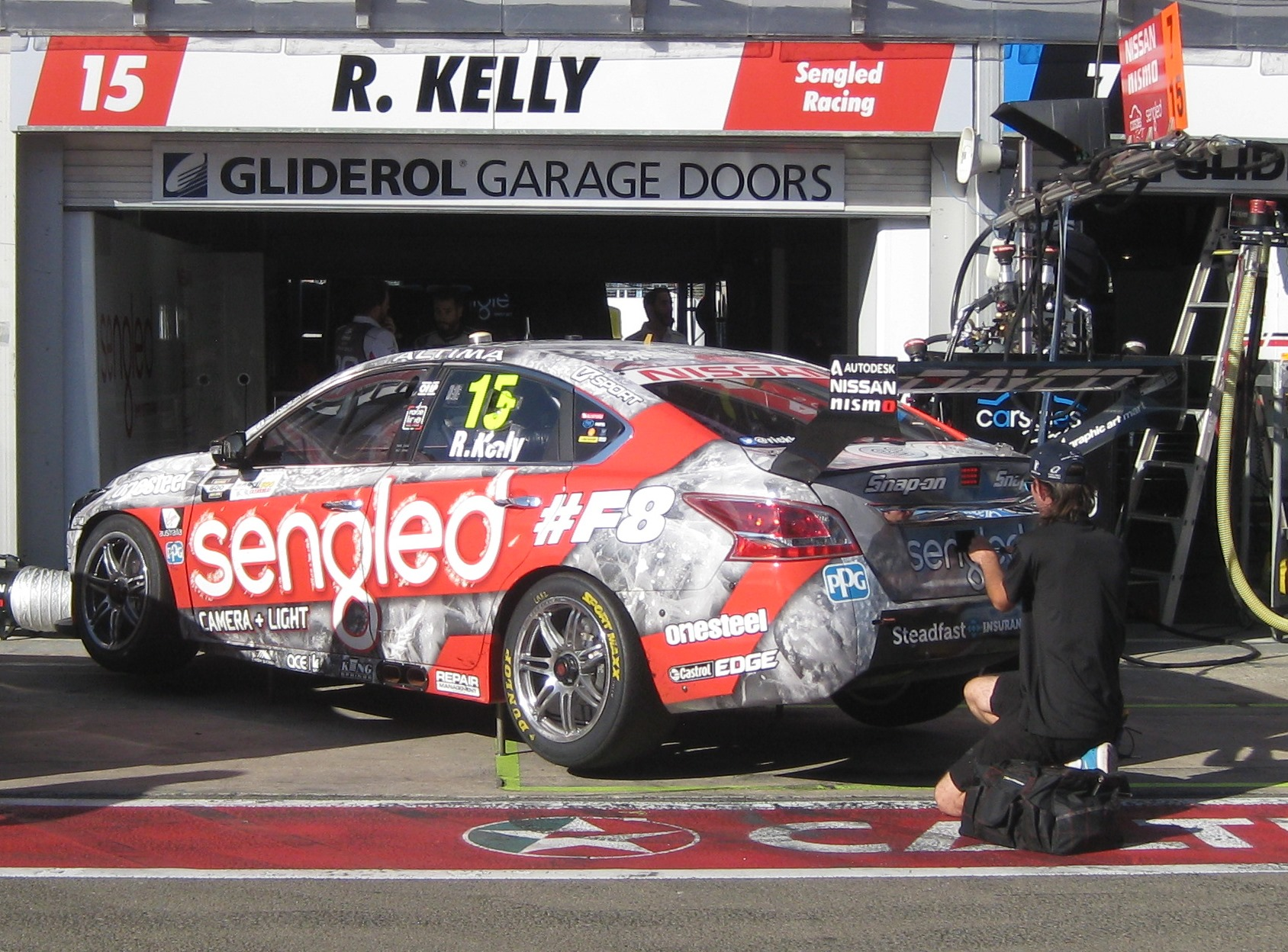
Kelly placed 14th in the 2017 Supercars Championship driving a Nissan L33 Altima

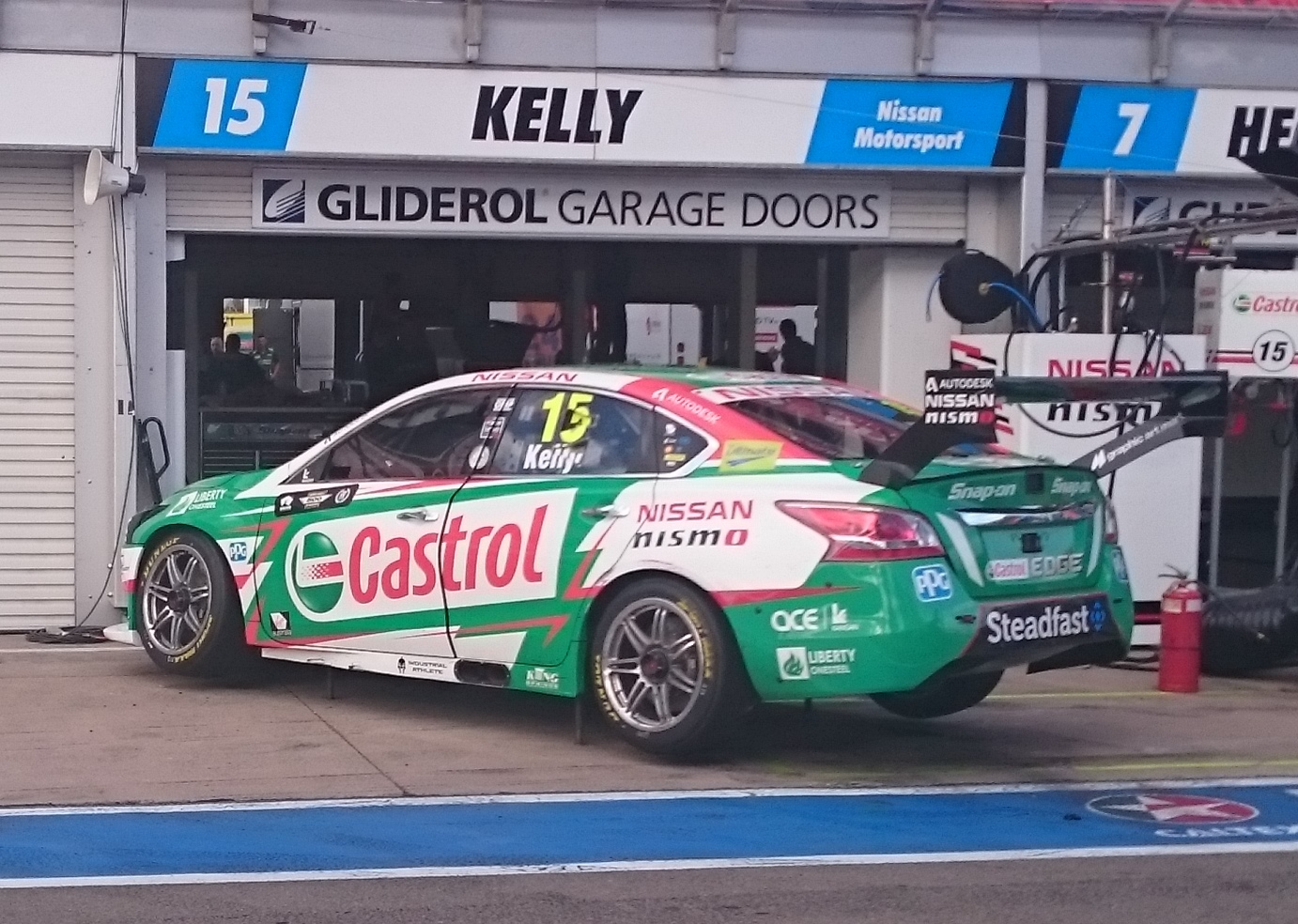
Kelly placed 8th in the 2018 Supercars Championship driving a Nissan L33 Altima

== Career results ==
=== Career summary ===
Season	Series	Position	Car	Team
2000	Australian Formula Ford Championship	2nd	Stealth Van Diemen RF94 Ford	
2001	Australian Drivers' Championship	1st	Reynard 94D Holden	Birrana Racing
2001	Shell Championship Series	47th	Holden VX Commodore	K-Mart Racing Team; Holden Racing Team
2002	V8 Supercar Championship Series	16th	Holden VX Commodore	Holden Young Lions
2003	V8 Supercar Championship Series	8th	Holden VX Commodore	K-mart Racing Team
2004	V8 Supercar Championship Series	6th	Holden VY Commodore	K-mart Racing Team
2005	V8 Supercar Championship Series	8th	Holden VZ Commodore	HSV Dealer Team
2006	V8 Supercar Championship Series	1st	Holden VZ Commodore	HSV Dealer Team
2007	V8 Supercar Championship Series	4th	Holden VE Commodore	HSV Dealer Team
2008	V8 Supercar Championship Series	7th	Holden VE Commodore	HSV Dealer Team
2009	V8 Supercar Championship Series	8th	Holden VE Commodore	Kelly Racing
2010	V8 Supercar Championship Series	8th	Holden VE Commodore	Kelly Racing
2011	International V8 Supercars Championship	6th	Holden VE Commodore	Kelly Racing
2012	International V8 Supercars Championship	14th	Holden VE Commodore	Kelly Racing
2013	International V8 Supercars Championship	14th	Nissan Altima L33	Nissan Motorsport
2014	International V8 Supercars Championship	13th	Nissan Altima L33	Nissan Motorsport
2015	International V8 Supercars Championship	9th	Nissan Altima L33	Nissan Motorsport
2016	International V8 Supercars Championship	13th	Nissan Altima L33	Nissan Motorsport
2017	Supercars Championship	14th	Nissan Altima L33	Nissan Motorsport
2018	Supercars Championship	8th	Nissan Altima L33	Nissan Motorsport
2019	Supercars Championship	17th	Nissan Altima L33	Kelly Racing
2020	Supercars Championship	16th	Ford Mustang GT	Kelly Racing

=== Supercars Championship results ===
Supercars results
Year	Team	No.	Car	1	2	3	4	5	6	7	8	9	10	11	12	13	14	15	16	17	18	19	20	21	22	23	24	25	26	27	28	29	30	31	32	33	34	35	36	37	38	39	Position	Points
2001	K-Mart Racing Team	51	Holden VX Commodore	PHI; R1	PHI; R2	ADE; R3	ADE; R4	EAS; R5	EAS; R6	HDV; R7	HDV; R8	HDV; R9	CAN; R10	CAN; R11	CAN; R12	BAR; R13	BAR; R14	BAR; R15	CAL; R16	CAL; R17	CAL; R18	ORA; R19	ORA; R20	QLD; R21; Ret	WIN; R22	WIN; R23	BAT; R24; 14	PUK; R25	PUK; R26	PUK; R27													47th	308
2001	Holden Young Lions	255	Holden VX Commodore																												SAN; R28; Ret	SAN; R29; 22	SAN; R30; 7										47th	308
2002	Holden Young Lions	02	Holden VX Commodore	ADE; R1; Ret	ADE; R2; DNS	PHI; R3; 20	PHI; R4; 5	EAS; R5; 13	EAS; R6; 22	EAS; R7; 25	HDV; R8; 12	HDV; R9; DNS	HDV; R10; DNS	CAN; R11; Ret	CAN; R12; Ret	CAN; R13; Ret	BAR; R14; 17	BAR; R15; 20	BAR; R16; 13	ORA; R17; 8	ORA; R18; 15	WIN; R19; 7	WIN; R20; 13	QLD; R21; Ret	BAT; R22; 4	SUR; R23; 22	SUR; R24; Ret	PUK; R25; 7	PUK; R26; 5	PUK; R27; 3	SAN; R28; Ret	SAN; R29; 5											16th	574
2003	K-mart Racing Team	15	Holden VX Commodore	ADE; R1; 9	ADE; R1; 24	PHI; R3; 11	EAS; R4; 9	WIN; R5; 11	BAR; R6; 10	BAR; R7; 9	BAR; R8; 4	HDV; R9; 14	HDV; R10; 7	HDV; R11; 18	QLD; R12; 9	ORA; R13; 24	SAN; R14; 3	BAT; R15; 1	SUR; R16; 5	SUR; R17; 7	PUK; R18; 8	PUK; R19; 13	PUK; R20; 5	EAS; R21; 25	EAS; R22; 10																		8th	1675
2004	K-mart Racing Team	15	Holden VY Commodore	ADE; R1; 12	ADE; R2; 6	EAS; R3; 1	PUK; R4; 7	PUK; R5; 4	PUK; R6; 5	HDV; R7; 6	HDV; R8; 1	HDV; R9; 21	BAR; R10; 4	BAR; R11; 2	BAR; R12; 4	QLD; R13; 15	WIN; R14; 2	ORA; R15; 30	ORA; R16; 9	SAN; R17; 5	BAT; R18; 1	SUR; R19; 21	SUR; R20; 25	SYM; R21; 1	SYM; R22; 2	SYM; R23; Ret	EAS; R24; 5	EAS; R25; Ret	EAS; R26; 15														6th	1793
2005	HSV Dealer Team	15	Holden VZ Commodore	ADE; R1; 15	ADE; R2; 9	PUK; R3; 16	PUK; R4; Ret	PUK; R5; 15	BAR; R6; 14	BAR; R7; 16	BAR; R8; 15	EAS; R9; 31	EAS; R10; 14	SHA; R11; Ret	SHA; R12; 16	SHA; R13; Ret	HDV; R14; 9	HDV; R15; 5	HDV; R16; 3	QLD; R17; 15	ORA; R18; 5	ORA; R19; 6	SAN; R20; 4	BAT; R21; 16	SUR; R22; 9	SUR; R23; 5	SUR; R24; 6	SYM; R25; 3	SYM; R26; 4	SYM; R27; 2	PHI; R28; 4	PHI; R29; 4	PHI; R30; 3										8th	1630
2006	HSV Dealer Team	15	Holden VZ Commodore	ADE; R1; 2	ADE; R2; 3	PUK; R3; 12	PUK; R4; 10	PUK; R5; 7	BAR; R6; 7	BAR; R7; 11	BAR; R8; 14	WIN; R9; 10	WIN; R10; 4	WIN; R11; 4	HDV; R12; 2	HDV; R13; 10	HDV; R14; 5	QLD; R15; 7	QLD; R16; 4	QLD; R17; 2	ORA; R18; 3	ORA; R19; 13	ORA; R20; 2	SAN; R21; 2	BAT; R22; 2	SUR; R23; 6	SUR; R24; 4	SUR; R25; 1	SYM; R26; 3	SYM; R27; 5	SYM; R28; 4	BHR; R29; 4	BHR; R30; 28	BHR; R31; 5	PHI; R32; 5	PHI; R33; 4	PHI; R34; 18						1st	3308
2007	HSV Dealer Team	1	Holden VE Commodore	ADE; R1; 4	ADE; R2; 1	BAR; R3; 2	BAR; R4; 2	BAR; R5; 3	PUK; R6; 3	PUK; R7; 3	PUK; R8; 1	WIN; R9; 3	WIN; R10; 3	WIN; R11; 3	EAS; R12; 3	EAS; R13; 2	EAS; R14; 4	HDV; R15; 2	HDV; R16; 2	HDV; R17; 2	QLD; R18; 7	QLD; R19; 16	QLD; R20; 6	ORA; R21; 2	ORA; R22; 15	ORA; R23; 15	SAN; R24; 2	BAT; R25; Ret	SUR; R26; 7	SUR; R27; 16	SUR; R28; 6	BHR; R29; 4	BHR; R30; 12	BHR; R31; 8	SYM; R32; 6	SYM; R33; 5	SYM; R34; Ret	PHI; R35; 5	PHI; R36; 8	PHI; R37; 10			4th	552
2008	HSV Dealer Team	15	Holden VE Commodore	ADE; R1; 8	ADE; R2; 6	EAS; R3; 4	EAS; R4; 6	EAS; R5; 2	HAM; R6; 2	HAM; R7; 6	HAM; R8; 4	BAR; R29; 6	BAR; R10; 6	BAR; R11; 5	SAN; R12; 7	SAN; R13; 12	SAN; R14; 17	HDV; R15; 9	HDV; R16; 9	HDV; R17; 6	QLD; R18; 8	QLD; R19; Ret	QLD; R20; 13	WIN; R21; 10	WIN; R22; 6	WIN; R23; 5	PHI; QR; 1	PHI; R24; 7	BAT; R25; 20	SUR; R26; Ret	SUR; R27; 6	SUR; R28; 5	BHR; R29; 9	BHR; R30; 22	BHR; R31; 20	SYM; R32; 19	SYM; R33; 9	SYM; R34; 8	ORA; R35; 9	ORA; R36; 4	ORA; R37; 1		7th	2430
2009	Kelly Racing	15	Holden VE Commodore	ADE; R1; 10	ADE; R2; 10	HAM; R3; 7	HAM; R4; 14	WIN; R5; 4	WIN; R6; 7	SYM; R7; 11	SYM; R8; 27	HDV; R9; 15	HDV; R10; 4	TOW; R11; 7	TOW; R12; Ret	SAN; R13; 24	SAN; R14; 13	QLD; R15; 14	QLD; R16; 10	PHI; QR; 30	PHI; R17; 5	BAT; R18; 8	SUR; R19; 12	SUR; R20; 9	SUR; R21; 20	SUR; R22; 9	PHI; R23; 3	PHI; R24; 2	BAR; R25; 7	BAR; R26; 16	SYD; R27; 9	SYD; R28; Ret											8th	2162
2010	Kelly Racing	15	Holden VE Commodore	YMC; R1; 10	YMC; R2; 4	BHR; R3; 9	BHR; R4; 4	ADE; R5; 23	ADE; R6; 6	HAM; R7; 8	HAM; R8; 6	QLD; R9; 8	QLD; R10; 7	WIN; R11; 18	WIN; R12; 4	HDV; R13; 14	HDV; R14; 9	TOW; R15; 15	TOW; R16; 13	PHI; QR; 1	PHI; R17; 4	BAT; R18; 16	SUR; R19; 14	SUR; R20; 6	SYM; R21; 14	SYM; R22; 25	SAN; R23; 7	SAN; R24; 8	SYD; R25; 3	SYD; R26; 7													8th	2347
2011	Kelly Racing	15	Holden VE Commodore	YMC; R1; 13	YMC; R2; 19	ADE; R3; 12	ADE; R4; 2	HAM; R5; 1	HAM; R6; 6	BAR; R7; 9	BAR; R8; 16	BAR; R9; 12	WIN; R10; 4	WIN; R11; 17	HID; R12; 1	HID; R13; 20	TOW; R14; 7	TOW; R15; 13	QLD; R16; 4	QLD; R17; 4	QLD; R18; 17	PHI; QR; 6	PHI; R19; 8	BAT; R20; 22	SUR; R21; 7	SUR; R22; 5	SYM; R23; 14	SYM; R24; 12	SAN; R25; 1	SAN; R26; 9	SYD; R27; 10	SYD; R28; 12											6th	2358
2012	Kelly Racing	15	Holden VE Commodore	ADE; R1; 7	ADE; R2; 11	SYM; R3; 19	SYM; R4; 16	HAM; R5; 5	HAM; R6; 12	BAR; R7; 9	BAR; R8; 20	BAR; R9; 19	PHI; R10; 6	PHI; R11; Ret	HID; R12; Ret	HID; R13; 23	TOW; R14; 8	TOW; R15; 20	QLD; R16; 12	QLD; R17; 25	SMP; R18; 17	SMP; R19; 15	SAN; QR; 6	SAN; R20; 12	BAT; R21; 15	SUR; R22; 8	SUR; R23; 11	YMC; R24; 27	YMC; R25; 12	YMC; R26; 9	WIN; R27; 13	WIN; R28; 19	SYD; R29; 6	SYD; R30; 11									14th	1894
2013	Nissan Motorsport	15	Nissan Altima L33	ADE; R1; 11	ADE; R2; 14	SYM; R3; 20	SYM; R4; 23	SYM; R5; 16	PUK; R6; 12	PUK; R7; 7	PUK; R8; 10	PUK; R9; 15	BAR; R10; 26	BAR; R11; 16	BAR; R12; 18	COA; R13; 6	COA; R14; 8	COA; R15; 9	COA; R16; 8	HID; R17; 5	HID; R18; 25	HID; R19; 12	TOW; R20; 12	TOW; R21; 20	QLD; R22; 13	QLD; R23; 21	QLD; R24; 9	WIN; R25; 14	WIN; R26; 22	WIN; R27; Ret	SAN; QR; 21	SAN; R28; 16	BAT; R29; 19	SUR; R30; 11	SUR; R31; 6	PHI; R32; 20	PHI; R33; 13	PHI; R34; 8	SYD; R35; 9	SYD; R36; 18			14th	1754
2014	Nissan Motorsport	15	Nissan Altima L33	ADE; R1; 6	ADE; R2; 11	ADE; R3; 5	SYM; R4; Ret	SYM; R5; 24	SYM; R6; 20	WIN; R7; 20	WIN; R8; 18	WIN; R9; 14	PUK; R10; 20	PUK; R11; 17	PUK; R12; 15	PUK; R13; 8	BAR; R14; 19	BAR; R15; 22	BAR; R16; 14	HID; R17; 17	HID; R18; 22	HID; R19; 9	TOW; R20; 14	TOW; R21; 19	TOW; R22; 18	QLD; R23; 11	QLD; R24; 5	QLD; R25; 15	SMP; R26; 6	SMP; R27; 9	SMP; R28; 14	SAN; QR; 14	SAN; R29; 13	BAT; R30; 8	SUR; R31; 19	SUR; R32; 9	PHI; R33; 8	PHI; R34; 8	PHI; R35; 11	SYD; R36; 5	SYD; R37; 14	SYD; R38; 7	13th	1921
2015	Nissan Motorsport	15	Nissan Altima L33	ADE; R1; 15	ADE; R2; 6	ADE; R3; 7	SYM; R4; 14	SYM; R5; 16	SYM; R6; 14	BAR; R7; 9	BAR; R8; 8	BAR; R9; 20	WIN; R10; 7	WIN; R11; 2	WIN; R12; 11	HID; R13; 3	HID; R14; 21	HID; R15; 13	TOW; R16; 16	TOW; R17; 16	QLD; R18; 16	QLD; R19; 13	QLD; R20; 17	SMP; R21; 6	SMP; R22; 12	SMP; R23; 15	SAN; QR; 14	SAN; R24; 10	BAT; R25; 16	SUR; R26; 9	SUR; R27; 2	PUK; R28; 14	PUK; R29; 11	PUK; R30; 17	PHI; R31; 17	PHI; R32; 8	PHI; R33; 6	SYD; R34; 7	SYD; R35; 8	SYD; R36; 3			9th	2154
2016	Nissan Motorsport	15	Nissan Altima L33	ADE; R1; 9	ADE; R2; 13	ADE; R3; 7	SYM; R4; 4	SYM; R5; Ret	PHI; R6; 14	PHI; R7; 11	BAR; R8; 9	BAR; R9; 5	WIN; R10; 4	WIN; R11; 15	HID; R12; 15	HID; R13; 15	TOW; R14; 21	TOW; R15; 12	QLD; R16; 8	QLD; R17; 14	SMP; R18; 9	SMP; R19; 11	SAN; QR; 14	SAN; R20; 10	BAT; R21; Ret	SUR; R22; 21	SUR; R23; 17	PUK; R24; 7	PUK; R25; 12	PUK; R26; 9	PUK; R27; 24	SYD; R28; 6	SYD; R29; Ret										13th	1835
2017	Nissan Motorsport	15	Nissan Altima L33	ADE; R1; 5	ADE; R2; 17	SYM; R3; Ret	SYM; R4; DNS	PHI; R5; 16	PHI; R6; 9	BAR; R7; 14	BAR; R8; 15	WIN; R9; 15	WIN; R10; 14	HID; R11; Ret	HID; R12; 10	TOW; R13; 17	TOW; R14; 12	QLD; R15; 8	QLD; R16; 13	SMP; R17; 11	SMP; R18; 20	SAN; QR; 13	SAN; R19; 14	BAT; R20; 13	SUR; R21; 10	SUR; R22; 11	PUK; R23; 11	PUK; R24; 12	NEW; R25; 10	NEW; R26; 4													14th	1773
2018	Nissan Motorsport	15	Nissan Altima L33	ADE; R1; 23	ADE; R2; 14	MEL; R3; 17	MEL; R4; 13	MEL; R5; 17	MEL; R6; Ret	SYM; R7; 15	SYM; R8; 11	PHI; R9; 2	PHI; R10; 3	BAR; R11; 14	BAR; R12; 10	WIN; R13; 1	WIN; R14; 4	HID; R15; 6	HID; R16; 5	TOW; R17; 15	TOW; R18; 7	QLD; R19; 13	QLD; R20; 9	SMP; R21; 6	BEN; R22; 2	BEN; R23; 17	SAN; QR; 16	SAN; R24; 8	BAT; R25; 11	SUR; R26; 22	SUR; R27; C	PUK; R28; 16	PUK; R29; 22	NEW; R30; 9	NEW; R31; 17								8th	2515
2019	Kelly Racing	15	Nissan Altima L33	ADE; R1; 11	ADE; R2; 24	MEL; R3; 22	MEL; R4; 16	MEL; R5; 16	MEL; R6; 19	SYM; R7; 17	SYM; R8; 15	PHI; R9; 7	PHI; R10; 8	BAR; R11; 15	BAR; R12; 20	WIN; R13; 14	WIN; R14; Ret	HID; R15; 21	HID; R16; 16	TOW; R17; 17	TOW; R18; 6	QLD; R19; 16	QLD; R20; 8	BEN; R21; 23	BEN; R22; 11	PUK; R23; 19	PUK; R24; 11	BAT; R25; 8	SUR; R26; 10	SUR; R27; 14	SAN; QR; 17	SAN; R28; 22	NEW; R29; 13	NEW; R30; 19									17th	1820
2020	Kelly Racing	15	Ford Mustang S550	ADE; R1; 9	ADE; R2; 13	MEL; R3; C	MEL; R4; C	MEL; R5; C	MEL; R6; C	SMP1; R7; 14	SMP1; R8; 19	SMP1; R9; 17	SMP2; R10; 18	SMP2; R11; 6	SMP2; R12; 17	HID1; R13; 15	HID1; R14; 13	HID1; R15; 10	HID2; R16; 14	HID2; R17; 11	HID2; R18; 22	TOW1; R19; 17	TOW1; R20; 20	TOW1; R21; 14	TOW2; R22; 11	TOW2; R23; 11	TOW2; R24; 16	BEN1; R25; 6	BEN1; R26; 6	BEN1; R27; 8	BEN2; R28; 23	BEN2; R29; 9	BEN2; R30; 15	BAT; R31; 17									16th	1316

=== Complete Bathurst 1000 results ===
Year	Team	Car	Co-driver	Position	Laps
2001	K-mart Racing Team	Holden Commodore VX	(Australia) Nathan Pretty	14th	158
2002	Holden Young Lions	Holden Commodore VX	(Australia) Nathan Pretty	4th	161
2003	K-mart Racing Team	Holden Commodore VY	(New Zealand) Greg Murphy	1st	161
2004	K-mart Racing Team	Holden Commodore VY	(New Zealand) Greg Murphy	1st	161
2005	HSV Dealer Team	Holden Commodore VZ	(Australia) Garth Tander	16th	149
2006	HSV Dealer Team	Holden Commodore VZ	(Australia) Todd Kelly	2nd	161
2007	HSV Dealer Team	Holden Commodore VE	(Australia) Garth Tander	DNF	134
2008	HSV Dealer Team	Holden Commodore VE	(New Zealand) Paul Radisich	DNS	0
2008	HSV Dealer Team	Holden Commodore VE	(Australia) Paul Dumbrell (Australia) David Reynolds	20th	127
2009	Kelly Racing	Holden Commodore VE	(Australia) Todd Kelly	8th	161
2010	Kelly Racing	Holden Commodore VE	(Australia) Owen Kelly	16th	161
2011	Kelly Racing	Holden Commodore VE	(Australia) Owen Kelly	22nd	159
2012	Kelly Racing	Holden Commodore VE	(Australia) David Russell	15th	161
2013	Nissan Motorsport	Nissan Altima L33	(Australia) Karl Reindler	19th	161
2014	Nissan Motorsport	Nissan Altima L33	(Australia) David Russell	8th	161
2015	Nissan Motorsport	Nissan Altima L33	(Australia) David Russell	16th	161
2016	Nissan Motorsport	Nissan Altima L33	(Australia) Russell Ingall	DNF	156
2017	Nissan Motorsport	Nissan Altima L33	(Australia) David Wall	13th	159
2018	Nissan Motorsport	Nissan Altima L33	(Australia) Garry Jacobson	11th	161
2019	Kelly Racing	Nissan Altima L33	(Australia) Dale Wood	8th	161
2020	Kelly Racing	Ford Mustang Mk.6	(Australia) Dale Wood	17th	144

Sporting positions
Preceded by Simon Wills	Winner of the Australian Drivers' Championship; 2001	Succeeded by Will Power
Preceded by Mark Skaife; Jim Richards	Winner of the Bathurst 1000; 2003, 2004 (with Greg Murphy)	Succeeded by Mark Skaife; Todd Kelly
Preceded by Russell Ingall	Winner of the V8 Supercar Championship Series; 2006	Succeeded by Garth Tander
Preceded by Jamie Whincup	Winner of the Clipsal 500; 2007	Succeeded by Jamie Whincup
