= 2003 Adelaide 500 =

2003 Supercar Championship event

(South Australia) 2003 Clipsal 500
Event Information
- Round 1 of 13 in the 2003 V8 Supercar Championship Series
- Date: 21–23 March 2003
- Location: Adelaide, South Australia
- Venue: Adelaide Street Circuit
- Weather: Fine

Results
Race 1
Distance	78 laps	250 km
Pole position	Jason Bright; Paul Weel Racing	1:23.3729
Winner	Marcos Ambrose; Stone Brothers Racing	1:55:06.9486
Race 2
Distance	78 laps	250 km
Winner	Mark Skaife; Holden Racing Team	2:09:50.4167
Round Results
First	Mark Skaife; Holden Racing Team	189 pts
Second	Steven Richards; Perkins Engineering	180 pts
Third	Paul Weel; Paul Weel Racing	147 pts

The 2003 Adelaide 500 (known for naming rights reasons as the 2003 Clipsal 500 Adelaide) was the fifth running of the Adelaide 500 race. The event served as the opening round of the 2003 V8 Supercar Championship Series and was held from March 21 to 23, 2003.

The weekend was won by Mark Skaife after claiming second in the first race of the event and winning the second race on Sunday. Marcos Ambrose won the first race and proved Skaife's strongest opponent of the weekend. However, suspension failure in the second race led him to retire and allowed Skaife to comfortably claim round honours.

The weekend presented a new dawn by way of a set of regulation changes known as Project Blueprint, designed to standardise the Holden Commodore and Ford Falcon platforms and ensure strict competitive parity.

== Background ==
The format, unique to V8 Supercars, and loosely similar to the Pukekohe 500 format, splits the 500 kilometre event into two separate 250 kilometre-races, each held on a different day. Points were assigned separately to the races, with Race 2 paying double points over Race 1 (180 points for a win in Race 1 and 360 points for a win in Race 2), and they combined to award a round result. The defending event winner from 2002 was Mark Skaife of the Holden Racing Team.

=== Entry list ===
There were 34 drivers entered into the event. It featured mixture of vehicle models - eight AU Ford Falcon's, eleven BA Falcon's, five VY Commodore's, and ten VX Commodore's.

This event marked the last V8 Supercar entry for Paul Romano, who entered with his privateer outfit. This was also the debut V8 Supercar event for New Zealander David Thexton. Thexton would enter his privateer team having purchased the assets from the recently-defunct Paragon Motorsport. Mark Noske would make his solo V8 Supercar debut with his family team, Noske Motorsport.

== Official results ==
=== Qualifying ===
Jason Bright claimed provisional pole position by five hundredths of a second over nearest competitor, Mark Skaife.

Pos	No	Driver	Team	Vehicle	Time
1	50	(Australia) Jason Bright	Paul Weel Racing	Holden Commodore (VX)	1:22.2745
2	1	(Australia) Mark Skaife	Holden Racing Team	Holden Commodore (VY)	1:22.3381
3	4	(Australia) Marcos Ambrose	Stone Brothers Racing	Ford Falcon (BA)	1:22.3728
4	11	(New Zealand) Steven Richards	Perkins Engineering	Holden Commodore (VX)	1:22.7533
5	17	(Australia) Steven Johnson	Dick Johnson Racing	Ford Falcon (BA)	1:22.9382
6	888	(Australia) John Bowe	Brad Jones Racing	Ford Falcon (BA)	1:22.9479
7	51	(New Zealand) Greg Murphy	Tom Walkinshaw Racing Australia	Holden Commodore (VX)	1:22.9517
8	2	(Australia) Todd Kelly	Holden Racing Team	Holden Commodore (VY)	1:23.0173
9	34	(Australia) Garth Tander	Garry Rogers Motorsport	Holden Commodore (VY)	1:23.0453
10	9	(Australia) Russell Ingall	Stone Brothers Racing	Ford Falcon (BA)	1:23.2297
11	3	(Australia) Cameron McConville	Lansvale Racing Team	Holden Commodore (VX)	1:23.3161
12	15	(Australia) Rick Kelly	Tom Walkinshaw Racing Australia	Holden Commodore (VX)	1:23.3274
13	5	(Australia) Glenn Seton	Ford Performance Racing	Ford Falcon (BA)	1:23.3811
14	66	(Australia) Dean Canto	Briggs Motorsport	Ford Falcon (BA)	1:23.3938
15	8	(Australia) Paul Dumbrell	Perkins Engineering	Holden Commodore (VX)	1:23.4476
16	44	(New Zealand) Simon Wills	Team Dynamik	Holden Commodore (VY)	1:23.4757
17	29	(Australia) Paul Morris	Paul Morris Motorsport	Holden Commodore (VY)	1:23.5521
18	6	(Australia) Craig Lowndes	Ford Performance Racing	Ford Falcon (BA)	1:23.7632
19	23	(Australia) Mark Noske	Noske Motorsport	Ford Falcon (AU)	1:23.7997
20	21	(Australia) Brad Jones	Brad Jones Racing	Ford Falcon (BA)	1:23.8477
21	33	(Australia) Jamie Whincup	Garry Rogers Motorsport	Holden Commodore (VX)	1:23.8759
22	75	(Australia) Anthony Tratt	Paul Little Racing	Ford Falcon (AU)	1:23.8861
23	31	(Australia) Steven Ellery	Steven Ellery Racing	Ford Falcon (BA)	1:23.8920
24	16	(Australia) Paul Weel	Paul Weel Racing	Holden Commodore (VX)	1:23.9179
25	021	(New Zealand) Craig Baird	Team Kiwi Racing	Holden Commodore (VX)	1:23.9580
26	20	(Australia) Jason Bargwanna	Larkham Motorsport	Ford Falcon (AU)	1:23.9645
27	19	(Australia) David Besnard	Ford Performance Racing	Ford Falcon (AU)	1:24.0216
28	10	(Australia) Mark Larkham	Larkham Motorsport	Ford Falcon (AU)	1:24.1538
29	00	(Australia) Greg Ritter	00 Motorsport	Ford Falcon (BA)	1:24.2541
30	7	(Australia) Rodney Forbes	00 Motorsport	Ford Falcon (AU)	1:24.2793
31	65	(New Zealand) Paul Radisich	Briggs Motorsport	Ford Falcon (BA)	1:24.8681
32	24	(Australia) Paul Romano	Romano Racing	Holden Commodore (VX)	1:25.7642
-	18	(Brazil) Max Wilson	Dick Johnson Racing	Ford Falcon (BA)	no time
DNQ	99	(New Zealand) David Thexton	Thexton Motor Racing	Ford Falcon (AU)	did not qualify

=== Top ten shootout ===
Bright successfully converted his provisional pole position pace into the shootout, setting a time nearly one tenth of a second faster than Skaife. This marked the first V8 Supercar pole position for Paul Weel Racing.

Pos	No	Driver	Team	Vehicle	Time
1	50	(Australia) Jason Bright	Paul Weel Racing	Holden Commodore (VX)	1:23.3729
2	1	(Australia) Mark Skaife	Holden Racing Team	Holden Commodore (VY)	1:23.4608
3	4	(Australia) Marcos Ambrose	Stone Brothers Racing	Ford Falcon (BA)	1:23.7897
4	51	(New Zealand) Greg Murphy	Tom Walkinshaw Racing Australia	Holden Commodore (VX)	1:24.0266
5	11	(New Zealand) Steven Richards	Perkins Engineering	Holden Commodore (VX)	1:24.1633
6	17	(Australia) Steven Johnson	Dick Johnson Racing	Ford Falcon (BA)	1:24.2497
7	888	(Australia) John Bowe	Brad Jones Racing	Ford Falcon (BA)	1:24.3838
8	2	(Australia) Todd Kelly	Holden Racing Team	Holden Commodore (VY)	1:24.7252
9	9	(Australia) Russell Ingall	Stone Brothers Racing	Ford Falcon (BA)	1:25.0673
10	34	(Australia) Garth Tander	Garry Rogers Motorsport	Holden Commodore (VY)	1:26.6227

=== Leg 1 ===
Pos	No	Driver	Team	Vehicle	Laps	Time/Retired	Grid
1	4	(Australia) Marcos Ambrose	Stone Brothers Racing	Ford Falcon (BA)	78	1hr 55min 06.9486sec	3
2	1	(Australia) Mark Skaife	Holden Racing Team	Holden Commodore (VY)	78	+ 2.206	2
3	50	(Australia) Jason Bright	Paul Weel Racing	Holden Commodore (VX)	78	+ 15.827	1
4	11	(New Zealand) Steven Richards	Perkins Engineering	Holden Commodore (VX)	78	+ 19.640	5
5	2	(Australia) Todd Kelly	Holden Racing Team	Holden Commodore (VY)	78	+ 25.290	8
6	17	(Australia) Steven Johnson	Dick Johnson Racing	Ford Falcon (BA)	78	+ 27.398	6
7	9	(Australia) Russell Ingall	Stone Brothers Racing	Ford Falcon (BA)	78	+ 38.029	9
8	3	(Australia) Cameron McConville	Lansvale Racing Team	Holden Commodore (VX)	78	+ 42.342	11
9	15	(Australia) Rick Kelly	Tom Walkinshaw Racing Australia	Holden Commodore (VX)	78	+ 46.584	12
10	51	(New Zealand) Greg Murphy	Tom Walkinshaw Racing Australia	Holden Commodore (VX)	78	+ 48.438	4
11	8	(Australia) Paul Dumbrell	Perkins Engineering	Holden Commodore (VX)	78	+ 48.801	15
12	65	(New Zealand) Paul Radisich	Briggs Motorsport	Ford Falcon (BA)	78	+ 50.775	31
13	34	(Australia) Garth Tander	Garry Rogers Motorsport	Holden Commodore (VY)	78	+ 53.225	10
14	16	(Australia) Paul Weel	Paul Weel Racing	Holden Commodore (VX)	78	+ 53.542	24
15	20	(Australia) Jason Bargwanna	Larkham Motorsport	Ford Falcon (AU)	78	+ 58.539	26
16	44	(New Zealand) Simon Wills	Team Dynamik	Holden Commodore (VY)	78	+ 1:02.679	16
17	33	(Australia) Jamie Whincup	Garry Rogers Motorsport	Holden Commodore (VX)	78	+ 1:04.064	21
18	5	(Australia) Glenn Seton	Ford Performance Racing	Ford Falcon (AU)	78	+ 1:07.194	13
19	75	(Australia) Anthony Tratt	Paul Little Racing	Ford Falcon (AU)	78	+ 1:14.659	22
20	66	(Australia) Dean Canto	Briggs Motorsport	Ford Falcon (BA)	77	+ 1 lap	14
21	021	(New Zealand) Craig Baird	Team Kiwi Racing	Holden Commodore (VX)	77	+ 1 lap	25
22	00	(Australia) Greg Ritter	00 Motorsport	Ford Falcon (BA)	77	+ 1 lap	29
23	10	(Australia) Mark Larkham	Larkham Motorsport	Ford Falcon (AU)	77	+ 1 lap	28
24	21	(Australia) Brad Jones	Brad Jones Racing	Ford Falcon (BA)	76	+ 2 laps	20
25	7	(Australia) Rodney Forbes	00 Motorsport	Ford Falcon (AU)	74	+ 4 laps	30
26	18	(Brazil) Max Wilson	Dick Johnson Racing	Ford Falcon (BA)	74	+ 4 laps	33
27	29	(Australia) Paul Morris	Paul Morris Motorsport	Holden Commodore (VY)	73	+ 5 laps	17
28	45	(New Zealand) Jason Richards	Team Dynamik	Holden Commodore (VY)	73	+ 5 laps	34
29	31	(Australia) Steven Ellery	Steven Ellery Racing	Ford Falcon (BA)	59	+ 19 laps	23
Ret	23	(Australia) Mark Noske	Noske Motorsport	Ford Falcon (AU)	52	Retired	19
Ret	19	(Australia) David Besnard	Ford Performance Racing	Ford Falcon (AU)	49	Retired	27
Ret	888	(Australia) John Bowe	Brad Jones Racing	Ford Falcon (BA)	48	Retired	7
Ret	24	(Australia) Paul Romano	Romano Racing	Holden Commodore (VX)	45	Retired	32
Ret	6	(Australia) Craig Lowndes	Ford Performance Racing	Ford Falcon (BA)	35	Engine	18
Fastest Lap: Marcos Ambrose (Stone Brothers Racing) - 1:23.4783 on lap 56

=== Leg 2 ===
Pos	No	Driver	Team	Vehicle	Laps	Time/Retired	Grid
1	1	(Australia) Mark Skaife	Holden Racing Team	Holden Commodore (VY)	78	2hr 09min 50.4167sec	2
2	11	(New Zealand) Steven Richards	Perkins Engineering	Holden Commodore (VX)	78	+ 1.746	4
3	16	(Australia) Paul Weel	Paul Weel Racing	Holden Commodore (VX)	78	+ 10.128	14
4	65	(New Zealand) Paul Radisich	Briggs Motorsport	Ford Falcon (BA)	78	+ 12.275	12
5	2	(Australia) Todd Kelly	Holden Racing Team	Holden Commodore (VY)	78	+ 12.517	5
6	50	(Australia) Jason Bright	Paul Weel Racing	Holden Commodore (VX)	78	+ 13.208	3
7	6	(Australia) Craig Lowndes	Ford Performance Racing	Ford Falcon (BA)	78	+ 13.944	34
8	8	(Australia) Paul Dumbrell	Perkins Engineering	Holden Commodore (VX)	78	+ 16.086	11
9	44	(New Zealand) Simon Wills	Team Dynamik	Holden Commodore (VY)	78	+ 17.753	16
10	5	(Australia) Glenn Seton	Ford Performance Racing	Ford Falcon (AU)	78	+ 18.465	18
11	51	(New Zealand) Greg Murphy	Tom Walkinshaw Racing Australia	Holden Commodore (VX)	78	+ 19.535	10
12	9	(Australia) Russell Ingall	Stone Brothers Racing	Ford Falcon (BA)	78	+ 19.554	7
13	00	(Australia) Greg Ritter	00 Motorsport	Ford Falcon (BA)	78	+ 23.666	22
14	021	(New Zealand) Craig Baird	Team Kiwi Racing	Holden Commodore (VX)	78	+ 23.812	21
15	34	(Australia) Garth Tander	Garry Rogers Motorsport	Holden Commodore (VY)	78	+ 24.106	13
16	10	(Australia) Mark Larkham	Larkham Motorsport	Ford Falcon (AU)	78	+ 27.050	23
17	23	(Australia) Mark Noske	Noske Motorsport	Ford Falcon (AU)	78	+ 27.340	30
18	21	(Australia) Brad Jones	Brad Jones Racing	Ford Falcon (BA)	78	+ 29.021	24
19	20	(Australia) Jason Bargwanna	Larkham Motorsport	Ford Falcon (AU)	78	+ 40.895	15
20	29	(Australia) Paul Morris	Paul Morris Motorsport	Holden Commodore (VY)	77	+ 1 lap	27
21	7	(Australia) Rodney Forbes	00 Motorsport	Ford Falcon (AU)	77	+ 1 lap	25
22	33	(Australia) Jamie Whincup	Garry Rogers Motorsport	Holden Commodore (VX)	76	+ 2 laps	17
23	888	(Australia) John Bowe	Brad Jones Racing	Ford Falcon (BA)	65	+ 13 laps	32
24	15	(Australia) Rick Kelly	Tom Walkinshaw Racing Australia	Holden Commodore (VX)	62	+ 16 laps	9
Ret	17	(Australia) Steven Johnson	Dick Johnson Racing	Ford Falcon (BA)	75	Accident damage	6
Ret	4	(Australia) Marcos Ambrose	Stone Brothers Racing	Ford Falcon (BA)	73	Suspension	1
Ret	19	(Australia) David Besnard	Ford Performance Racing	Ford Falcon (AU)	71	Retired	31
Ret	66	(Australia) Dean Canto	Briggs Motorsport	Ford Falcon (BA)	66	Accident	20
Ret	3	(Australia) Cameron McConville	Lansvale Racing Team	Holden Commodore (VX)	54	Retired	8
Ret	18	(Brazil) Max Wilson	Dick Johnson Racing	Ford Falcon (BA)	50	Driver injury	26
Ret	24	(Australia) Paul Romano	Romano Racing	Holden Commodore (VX)	15	Retired	33
Ret	75	(Australia) Anthony Tratt	Paul Little Racing	Ford Falcon (AU)	1	Accident	19
Ret	45	(New Zealand) Jason Richards	Team Dynamik	Holden Commodore (VY)	1	Accident	28
DSQ	31	(Australia) Steven Ellery	Steven Ellery Racing	Ford Falcon (BA)		Disqualified	29
Fastest Lap: Mark Skaife (Holden Racing Team) - 1:23.2731 on lap 20

Notes

- ^1 – Russell Ingall was given a 10-second penalty after he was deemed to have gained an advantage by spinning Greg Murphy in the final laps.
- ^2 – Craig Baird was given a 3-second penalty for a driving infringement.

=== Round results ===
Pos	No	Driver	Leg 1 Points	Leg 2 Points	Total Points
1	1	(Australia) Mark Skaife	93	96	189
2	11	(New Zealand) Steven Richards	87	93	180
3	50	(Australia) Jason Bright	90	81	171
4	2	(Australia) Todd Kelly	84	84	168
5	65	(New Zealand) Paul Radisich	63	87	150
6	16	(Australia) Paul Weel	57	90	147
7	8	(Australia) Paul Dumbrell	66	75	141
8	9	(Australia) Russell Ingall	78	63	141
9	51	(New Zealand) Greg Murphy	69	66	135
10	44	(New Zealand) Simon Wills	51	72	123
11	4	(Australia) Marcos Ambrose	96	21	117
12	5	(Australia) Glenn Seton	45	69	114
13	34	(Australia) Garth Tander	60	54	114
14	17	(Australia) Steven Johnson	81	24	105
15	15	(Australia) Rick Kelly	72	27	99
16	20	(Australia) Jason Bargwanna	54	42	96
17	00	(Australia) Greg Ritter	33	60	93
18	021	(New Zealand) Craig Baird	36	57	93
19	3	(Australia) Cameron McConville	75	12	87
20	10	(Australia) Mark Larkham	30	51	81
21	33	(Australia) Jamie Whincup	48	33	81
22	6	(Australia) Craig Lowndes		78	78
23	21	(Australia) Brad Jones	27	45	72
24	7	(Australia) Rodney Forbes	24	36	60
25	23	(Australia) Mark Noske	9	48	57
26	29	(Australia) Paul Morris	18	39	57
27	66	(Australia) Dean Canto	39	15	54
28	75	(Australia) Anthony Tratt	42		42
29	888	(Australia) John Bowe	3	30	33
30	18	(Brazil) Max Wilson	21	9	30
31	19	(Australia) David Besnard	6	18	24
32	45	(New Zealand) Jason Richards	15		15
33	31	(Australia) Steve Ellery	12		12
DNF	24	(Australia) Paul Romano			
DNQ	99	(New Zealand) David Thexton			

== Statistics ==
- Provisional Position - #50 Jason Bright - 1:22.2745
- Pole Position - #50 Jason Bright - 1:23.3729
- Fastest Lap - #1 Mark Skaife - 1:23.2731 (new lap record)

V8 Supercar
Previous race: Opening round	2003 season	Next race: 2003 V8 Supercars Phillip Island round
