= 2003 PlaceMakers V8 International =

2003 Supercar Championship event

(New Zealand) 2003 PlaceMakers V8 International
Event Information
- Round 12 of 13 in the 2003 V8 Supercar Championship Series
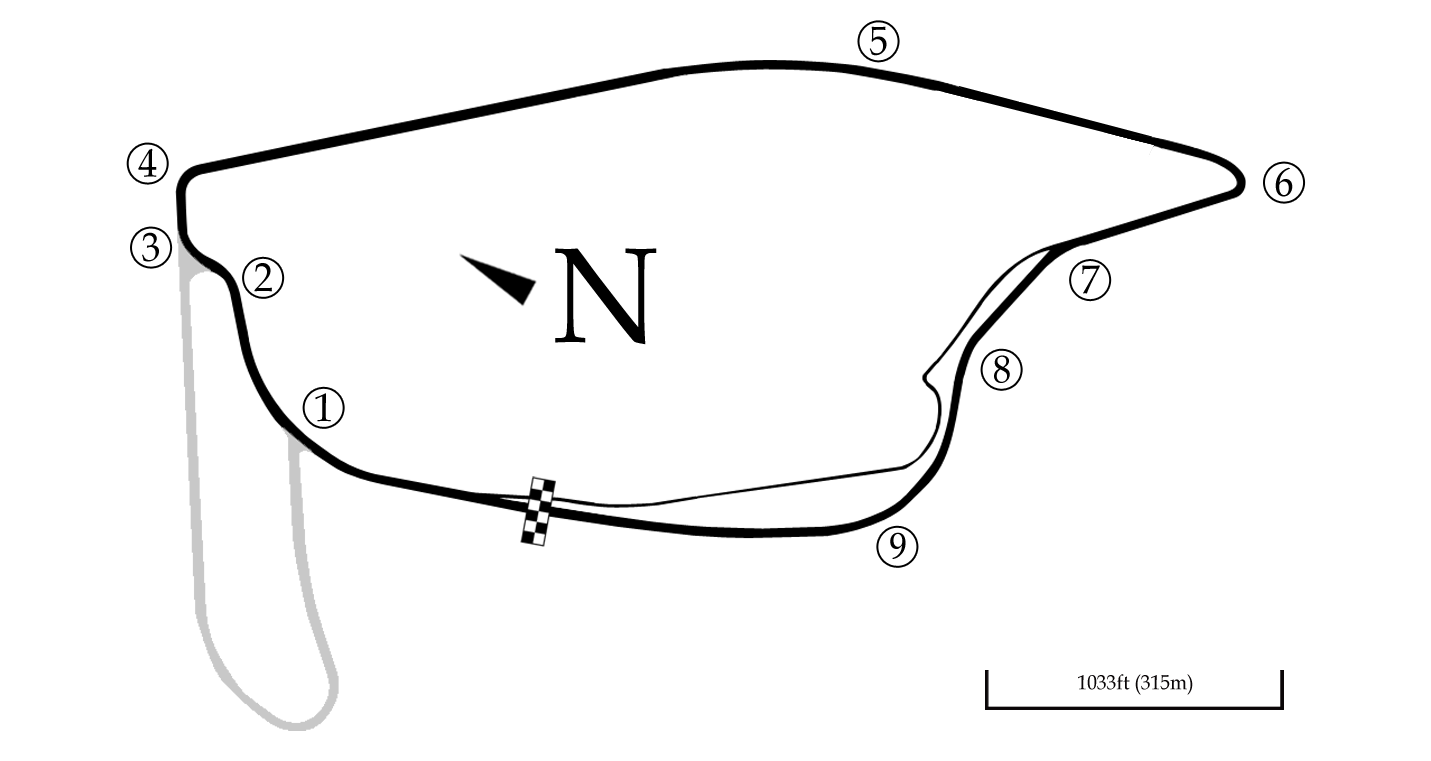
- Date: 7–9 November 2003
- Location: Pukekohe, New Zealand
- Venue: Pukekohe Park Raceway
- Weather: Friday: Overcast; Saturday: Heavy rain Sunday: Sunny

Results
Race 1
Distance	36 laps	100 km
Pole position	Greg Murphy; John Kelly Racing	56.9015
Winner	Greg Murphy; John Kelly Racing	43:48.1246
Race 2
Distance	54 laps	150 km
Winner	Greg Murphy; John Kelly Racing	1:01:24.3090
Race 3
Distance	54 laps	150 km
Winner	Mark Skaife; Holden Racing Team	53:22.1378
Round Results
First	Greg Murphy; John Kelly Racing	188 pts
Second	Mark Skaife; Holden Racing Team	178 pts
Third	Todd Kelly; Holden Racing Team	178 pts

The 2003 PlaceMakers V8 International was the twelfth round of the 2003 V8 Supercar Championship Series. It was held on the weekend of 7 to 9 November at Pukekohe Park Raceway in New Zealand.

The round was largely dominated once again by Greg Murphy, who took his third consecutive championship round victory at Pukekohe after winning the first two races. Despite entering the round with a sizeable championship lead, Marcos Ambrose struggled throughout the weekend, and forced the championship to be decided at the final round at Eastern Creek.

== Background ==
Ambrose entered the weekend with a chance to clinch the championship. He had a 72-point gap over nearest championship rival, Murphy. The Tasmanian would have his work cut out for him as Pukekohe remained happy hunting ground for Murphy. The Kiwi had been undefeated in round victories since the inaugural event in 2001, and even in the non-championship round hosted in the 1996 Mobil Sprints.

A total of 32 drivers were entered for the round. Seven of them were New Zealand-born drivers. These included Murphy, Steven Richards, Jason Richards, Paul Radisich, Simon Wills, Craig Baird and David Thexton. Despite having spent the vast majority of his life in the country, this would be Thexton's first attempt at racing at Pukekohe Park Raceway. Although given his failure to qualify at the vast majority of the 2003 championship rounds, whether he'd be able to race at all this weekend remained in question.

== Race report ==
=== Qualifying ===
In practice, Jason Richards was involved in a crash which saw his car roll several times, forcing him out of the weekend.

Pos	No	Name	Team	Car	Time	Grid
1	51	(New Zealand) Greg Murphy	John Kelly Racing	Holden Commodore (VY)	56.5453	1
2	1	(Australia) Mark Skaife	Holden Racing Team	Holden Commodore (VY)	56.5698	2
3	50	(Australia) Jason Bright	Paul Weel Racing	Holden Commodore (VX)	56.6932	3
4	18	(Brazil) Max Wilson	Dick Johnson Racing	Ford Falcon (BA)	56.7490	4
5	6	(Australia) Craig Lowndes	Ford Performance Racing	Ford Falcon (BA)	56.9390	5
6	4	(Australia) Marcos Ambrose	Stone Brothers Racing	Ford Falcon (BA)	56.9618	6
7	34	(Australia) Garth Tander	Garry Rogers Motorsport	Holden Commodore (VY)	57.0019	7
8	20	(Australia) Jason Bargwanna	Larkham Motorsport	Ford Falcon (BA)	57.0416	8
9	65	(New Zealand) Paul Radisich	Triple Eight Race Engineering	Ford Falcon (BA)	57.0805	9
10	2	(Australia) Todd Kelly	Holden Racing Team	Holden Commodore (VY)	57.1031	10
11	11	(New Zealand) Steven Richards	Perkins Engineering	Holden Commodore (VY)	57.1377	11
12	17	(Australia) Steven Johnson	Dick Johnson Racing	Ford Falcon (BA)	57.1615	12
13	66	(Australia) Dean Canto	Triple Eight Race Engineering	Ford Falcon (BA)	57.1670	13
14	5	(Australia) Glenn Seton	Ford Performance Racing	Ford Falcon (BA)	57.1729	14
15	888	(Australia) John Bowe	Brad Jones Racing	Ford Falcon (BA)	57.2001	15
16	21	(Australia) Brad Jones	Brad Jones Racing	Ford Falcon (BA)	57.2249	16
17	9	(Australia) Russell Ingall	Stone Brothers Racing	Ford Falcon (BA)	57.2317	17
18	16	(Australia) Paul Weel	Paul Weel Racing	Holden Commodore (VX)	57.2934	18
19	021	(New Zealand) Craig Baird	Team Kiwi Racing	Holden Commodore (VX)	57.3320	19
20	31	(Australia) Steven Ellery	Steven Ellery Racing	Ford Falcon (BA)	57.3756	20
21	44	(New Zealand) Simon Wills	Team Dynamik	Holden Commodore (VY)	57.3867	21
22	29	(Australia) Paul Morris	Paul Morris Motorsport	Holden Commodore (VY)	57.4506	22
23	8	(Australia) Paul Dumbrell	Perkins Engineering	Holden Commodore (VX)	57.5045	23
24	10	(Australia) Mark Larkham	Larkham Motorsport	Ford Falcon (AU)	57.5235	24
25	3	(Australia) Cameron McConville	Lansvale Racing Team	Holden Commodore (VX)	57.5580	25
26	15	(Australia) Rick Kelly	John Kelly Racing	Holden Commodore (VX)	57.5769	26
27	7	(Australia) David Besnard	Rod Nash Racing	Ford Falcon (BA)	57.6748	27
28	33	(Australia) Jamie Whincup	Garry Rogers Motorsport	Holden Commodore (VX)	57.7048	28
29	23	(Australia) Mark Noske	Noske Motorsport	Ford Falcon (AU)	57.7748	29
30	99	(New Zealand) David Thexton	Thexton Motor Racing	Ford Falcon (AU)	59.0554	30
DNQ	45	(New Zealand) Jason Richards	Team Dynamik	Holden Commodore (VY)	no time	

=== Top Ten Shootout ===
Results from the Top Ten Shootout were discounted due to the changing conditions throughout the session. Grid results were reverted to provisional qualifying.

Pos	No	Name	Team	Vehicle	Time
1	2	(Australia) Todd Kelly	Holden Racing Team	Holden Commodore (VY)	0:56.9015
2	50	(Australia) Jason Bright	Paul Weel Racing	Holden Commodore (VX)	0:57.6482
3	51	(New Zealand) Greg Murphy	John Kelly Racing	Holden Commodore (VY)	0:57.6955
4	18	(Brazil) Max Wilson	Dick Johnson Racing	Ford Falcon (BA)	0:57.8263
5	65	(New Zealand) Paul Radisich	Triple Eight Race Engineering	Ford Falcon (BA)	0:57.8697
6	1	(Australia) Mark Skaife	Holden Racing Team	Holden Commodore (VY)	0:57.9175
7	20	(Australia) Jason Bargwanna	Larkham Motor Sport	Ford Falcon (BA)	0:58.1224
8	4	(Australia) Marcos Ambrose	Stone Brothers Racing	Ford Falcon (BA)	0:58.2709
9	6	(Australia) Craig Lowndes	Ford Performance Racing	Ford Falcon (BA)	0:58.5551
10	34	(Australia) Garth Tander	Garry Rogers Motorsport	Holden Commodore (VY)	1:00.2457

=== Race 1 ===
In inclement conditions, Max Wilson leapt off the line exceptionally well and challenged Skaife for the lead through turn one. Heading into turn two, both drivers held their ground and the resulting contact sent them both into a spin. Skaife was sent rearward into the wall and was fortunate to extricate himself from the gravel trap. Nonetheless, both he and Wilson had now fallen toward the end of the pack. A few hundred yards behind them, Jamie Whincup, Mark Larkham, David Besnard, Anthony Tratt and Cameron McConville had tangled and struck the fence. Tratt and McConville were unable to continue the race. The safety car was deployed and multiple drivers (including Murphy and Ambrose) peeled in to complete their mandatory stops.

Jason Bright took over the lead on the safety car restart. Ambrose had jumped Murphy in the pitstop cycle but was quickly passed again by Murphy as the race resumed. Bright rapidly fell down the pack thanks to visibility issues brought on by a fault windshield wiper as Craig Lowndes assumed the lead. On lap 8, Mark Noske crashed heavily at turn one after aquaplaning into the armco barrier. The impact lifted the rear-end of the car meters off the ground and the resulting damage would ultimately force the Noske Motorsport car out of the rest of the weekend. On lap 25, Lowndes completed his pitstop as Murphy assumed the lead. Down the pack, Steven Richards' out-lap proved tricky. First tangling with Craig Baird at turn two and then Russell Ingall at the hairpin as he tumbled out of the top 20.

Up the front, Murphy cruised home to victory. Todd Kelly and Garth Tander rounded out the podium. Ambrose managed to fend off a late race charge from Skaife to assist his championship hopes and Skaife's began to dwindle.

Pos	No	Name	Team	Laps	Time / difference	Grid
1	51	(New Zealand) Greg Murphy	John Kelly Racing	36	43min 48.1246sec	1
2	2	(Australia) Todd Kelly	Holden Racing Team	36	+ 8.249	10
3	34	(Australia) Garth Tander	Garry Rogers Motorsport	36	+ 9.217	7
4	20	(Australia) Jason Bargwanna	Larkham Motorsport	36	+ 10.019	8
5	65	(New Zealand) Paul Radisich	Triple Eight Race Engineering	36	+ 11.485	9
6	4	(Australia) Marcos Ambrose	Stone Brothers Racing	36	+ 14.513	6
7	1	(Australia) Mark Skaife	Holden Racing Team	36	+ 15.073	2
8	15	(Australia) Rick Kelly	John Kelly Racing	36	+ 17.122	26
9	31	(Australia) Steven Ellery	Steven Ellery Racing	36	+ 25.022	20
10	17	(Australia) Steven Johnson	Dick Johnson Racing	36	+ 26.173	12
11	5	(Australia) Glenn Seton	Ford Performance Racing	36	+ 27.725	14
12	888	(Australia) John Bowe	Brad Jones Racing	36	+ 29.278	15
13	44	(New Zealand) Simon Wills	Team Dynamik	36	+ 32.505	21
14	29	(Australia) Paul Morris	Paul Morris Motorsport	36	+ 37.106	22
15	16	(Australia) Paul Weel	Paul Weel Racing	36	+ 38.400	18
16	6	(Australia) Craig Lowndes	Ford Performance Racing	36	+ 41.086	5
17	66	(Australia) Dean Canto	Triple Eight Race Engineering	36	+ 42.208	13
18	18	(Brazil) Max Wilson	Dick Johnson Racing	36	+ 46.975	4
19	9	(Australia) Russell Ingall	Stone Brothers Racing	36	+ 47.672	17
20	11	(New Zealand) Steven Richards	Perkins Engineering	36	+ 47.857	11
21	50	(Australia) Jason Bright	Paul Weel Racing	36	+ 57.903	3
22	21	(Australia) Brad Jones	Brad Jones Racing	35	+ 1 lap	16
23	021	(New Zealand) Craig Baird	Team Kiwi Racing	35	+ 1 lap	19
24	8	(Australia) Paul Dumbrell	Perkins Engineering	34	+ 2 laps	23
25	7	(Australia) David Besnard	Rod Nash Racing	34	+ 2 laps	27
26	99	(New Zealand) David Thexton	Thexton Motor Racing	34	+ 2 laps	29
27	10	(Australia) Mark Larkham	Larkham Motorsport	29	+ 7 laps	24
28	33	(Australia) Jamie Whincup	Garry Rogers Motorsport	28	+ 8 laps	27
DNF	23	(Australia) Mark Noske	Noske Motorsport	7	Accident	28
DNF	75	(Australia) Anthony Tratt	Paul Little Racing	0	Accident	
DNF	3	(Australia) Cameron McConville	Lansvale Racing Team	0	Accident	25
Fastest lap: Steven Richards (Perkins Engineering), 1:01.6893

=== Race 2 ===
It was a clean start, with Murphy and Todd Kelly very evenly matched off the line. Murphy would prevail and set off into an affirmative lead. Stuck in traffic, Skaife completed his compulsory pitstop early. This proved extremely effective as, when race leader Murphy had completed his pitstop, Skaife was right behind him in what was a net second place. The battle was close, with Skaife nudging the rear of Murphy's car at the hairpin on lap 21, almost sending the Kiwi into a spin. The next lap, Skaife made the move stick with the battle still raging all the way up to Ford Mountain.

Ingall and Brad Jones tangled at the hairpin, sending the former into the barrier on corner exit. The damage incurred forced the Stone Brothers racer into the pits. On lap 34, Steven Johnson's week-long engine issues culminated in a blown engine on the back straight. At the same time, Skaife tripped up on the oil left by Johnson's expired engine and conceded the lead back to Murphy. Paul Dumbrell fell victim to the same oil track and speared off into the gravel trap. Dumbrell's stranded car instigated a safety car. All the while, Ambrose completed an extra pitstop over tyre concerns, putting himself a lap down.

Skaife applied the pressure to Murphy early following the restart. But as soon as the safety car had ended, it was brought out again, after Tander found himself stranded on the exit to the back straight. Damage to David Thexton's front bumper suggested that Tander had fallen victim to the mobile chicane. There was chaos at turn one when Steven Ellery was sent into a spin, scattering the field, who all miraculously avoided t-boning the Supercheap Auto Falcon.

Murphy won once again, ahead of Skaife and Bright. Ambrose's low placing kept the championship alive heading into the final race.

Pos	No	Name	Team	Laps	Time / difference	Grid
1	51	(New Zealand) Greg Murphy	John Kelly Racing	54	1hr 01min 24.3090sec	1
2	1	(Australia) Mark Skaife	Holden Racing Team	54	+ 1.315	7
3	50	(Australia) Jason Bright	Paul Weel Racing	54	+ 2.776	21
4	2	(Australia) Todd Kelly	Holden Racing Team	54	+ 3.727	2
5	20	(Australia) Jason Bargwanna	Larkham Motorsport	54	+ 10.078	4
6	11	(New Zealand) Steven Richards	Perkins Engineering	54	+ 11.084	10
7	65	(New Zealand) Paul Radisich	Triple Eight Race Engineering	54	+ 11.446	5
8	44	(New Zealand) Simon Wills	Team Dynamik	54	+ 12.225	13
9	5	(Australia) Glenn Seton	Ford Performance Racing	54	+ 12.494	11
10	888	(Australia) John Bowe	Brad Jones Racing	54	+ 13.094	12
11	16	(Australia) Paul Weel	Paul Weel Racing	54	+ 13.250	15
12	6	(Australia) Craig Lowndes	Ford Performance Racing	54	+ 14.418	16
13	15	(Australia) Rick Kelly	John Kelly Racing	54	+ 15.036	8
14	66	(Australia) Dean Canto	Triple Eight Race Engineering	54	+ 16.129	17
15	7	(Australia) David Besnard	Ford Performance Racing	54	+ 16.477	25
16	29	(Australia) Paul Morris	Paul Morris Motorsport	54	+ 21.490	14
17	33	(Australia) Jamie Whincup	Garry Rogers Motorsport	54	+ 21.541	28
18	3	(Australia) Cameron McConville	Lansvale Racing Team	54	+ 22.000	31
19	021	(New Zealand) Craig Baird	Team Kiwi Racing	54	+ 22.157	23
20	10	(Australia) Mark Larkham	Larkham Motorsport	54	+ 22.838	27
21	31	(Australia) Steven Ellery	Steven Ellery Racing	54	+ 25.088	9
22	21	(Australia) Brad Jones	Brad Jones Racing	53	+ 1 lap	22
23	4	(Australia) Marcos Ambrose	Stone Brothers Racing	53	+ 1 lap	6
24	18	(Brazil) Max Wilson	Dick Johnson Racing	53	+ 1 lap	18
25	75	(Australia) Anthony Tratt	Paul Little Racing	53	+ 1 lap	30
26	9	(Australia) Russell Ingall	Stone Brothers Racing	52	+ 2 laps	19
27	99	(New Zealand) David Thexton	Thexton Motor Racing	52	+ 2 laps	26
28	8	(Australia) Paul Dumbrell	Perkins Engineering	50	+ 4 laps	24
Ret	34	(Australia) Garth Tander	Garry Rogers Motorsport	39	Accident	3
Ret	17	(Australia) Steven Johnson	Dick Johnson Racing	32	Engine	10
WD	23	(Australia) Mark Noske	Noske Motorsport		Withdrawn	
Fastest lap: Mark Skaife (Holden Racing Team), 0.57.4463

=== Race 3 ===
John Bowe did not start the racing owing to mechanical problems. At the start, Murphy bogged down somewhat and Skaife surged ahead of the Kmart car. Bright followed in hot pursuit, almost taking the lead altogether into turn one. Down the pack, Lowndes was served off the track by Paul Weel, losing him a bundle of positions. Heading into the hairpin, the front-left suspension on Jamie Whincup's car failed and was sent spearing into the wall at the hairpin. Whincup was able to extricate himself from the gravel trap, thus negating the need for safety car.

Johnson and Ingall tangled at turn three, completing a torrid weekend for the Dick Johnson Racing driver. Ambrose wasn't faring much better. A slow stop shuffled him further down the order. When he rejoined, he found himself stuck behind Glenn Seton, who refused to relinquish his position. Ingall was dispatched to pave a way for his teammate, but the lack of pace in Ambrose's car hindered these efforts. Dean Canto crashed on the front straight, inflicting damage on all corners of his Falcon. With a handful of laps remaining, Besnard's engine detonated on the back straight.

With 13 laps remaining, Murphy lost second place to Bright who set off after Skaife. Bright did gnaw down the gap to under four seconds, but Skaife had the race under control, and ultimately won. Bright finished second and Murphy was third, some 15 seconds behind Bright and holding off a late charge from Todd Kelly. Murphy once again won the round and kept his undefeated round tally at Pukekohe intact.

Pos	No	Name	Team	Laps	Time / difference	Grid
1	1	(Australia) Mark Skaife	Holden Racing Team	54	53min 22.1378sec	2
2	50	(Australia) Jason Bright	Paul Weel Racing	54	+ 3.901	3
3	51	(New Zealand) Greg Murphy	John Kelly Racing	54	+ 18.021	1
4	2	(Australia) Todd Kelly	Holden Racing Team	54	+ 18.181	4
5	15	(Australia) Rick Kelly	John Kelly Racing	54	+ 23.175	13
6	11	(New Zealand) Steven Richards	Perkins Engineering	54	+ 32.728	6
7	44	(New Zealand) Simon Wills	Team Dynamik	54	+ 36.036	8
8	65	(New Zealand) Paul Radisich	Triple Eight Race Engineering	54	+ 41.397	7
9	4	(Australia) Marcos Ambrose	Stone Brothers Racing	54	+ 44.768	23
10	9	(Australia) Russell Ingall	Stone Brothers Racing	54	+ 45.326	26
11	5	(Australia) Glenn Seton	Ford Performance Racing	54	+ 48.870	9
12	16	(Australia) Paul Weel	Paul Weel Racing	54	+ 50.074	11
13	20	(Australia) Jason Bargwanna	Larkham Motorsport	54	+ 50.480	5
14	31	(Australia) Steven Ellery	Steven Ellery Racing	54	+ 54.019	21
15	21	(Australia) Brad Jones	Brad Jones Racing	54	+ 55.296	22
16	17	(Australia) Steven Johnson	Dick Johnson Racing	54	+ 55.552	30
17	8	(Australia) Paul Dumbrell	Perkins Engineering	54	+ 58.937	28
18	6	(Australia) Craig Lowndes	Ford Performance Racing	53	+ 1 lap	12
19	18	(Brazil) Max Wilson	Dick Johnson Racing	53	+ 1 lap	24
20	3	(Australia) Cameron McConville	Lansvale Racing Team	53	+ 1 lap	18
21	34	(Australia) Garth Tander	Garry Rogers Motorsport	53	+ 1 lap	29
22	021	(New Zealand) Craig Baird	Team Kiwi Racing	53	+ 1 lap	19
23	10	(Australia) Mark Larkham	Larkham Motorsport	53	+ 1 lap	20
24	75	(Australia) Anthony Tratt	Paul Little Racing	52	+ 2 laps	25
25	66	(Australia) Dean Canto	Triple Eight Race Engineering	52	+ 2 laps	14
26	99	(New Zealand) David Thexton	Thexton Motor Racing	52	+ 2 laps	27
Ret	7	(Australia) David Besnard	Rod Nash Racing	48	Engine	15
Ret	29	(Australia) Paul Morris	Paul Morris Motorsport	33	Retired	16
Ret	33	(Australia) Jamie Whincup	Garry Rogers Motorsport	0	Suspension	17
DNS	888	(Australia) John Bowe	Brad Jones Racing	0	Did Not Start	10
WD	23	(Australia) Mark Noske	Noske Motorsport		Withdrawn	
Fastest lap: Mark Skaife (Holden Racing Team), 0.57.4552

== Aftermath ==
Despite entering the Pukekohe round with a chance of capturing his maiden championship, a string of poor results for Ambrose meant the gap between him and his title rivals had closed significantly. Skaife, initially 167 points behind Ambrose preceding this round, had more than halved the gap to the championship lead. Murphy was now only 24 points behind Ambrose, and with a string of wins in recent rounds, including the Bathurst 1000, he was looked at favourably to vanquish the Stone Brothers Racing driver in the championship finale.

When the series returned in 2004, Murphy's dominance at the venue came to an end. Bright would take the spoils while Murphy was left to scrape podiums together in a grueling duel between him and championship rival, Ambrose.

Mercifully, after having failed to qualify once again at the next round, this would prove to be the last V8 Supercar race for David Thexton.

=== Championship standings ===
Pos.	No	Driver	Team	Pts
1	4	(Australia) Marcos Ambrose	Stone Brothers Racing	1893
2	51	(New Zealand) Greg Murphy	John Kelly Racing	1869
3	1	(Australia) Mark Skaife	Holden Racing Team	1823
4	9	(Australia) Russell Ingall	Stone Brothers Racing	1709
5	6	(Australia) Craig Lowndes	Ford Performance Racing	1588
