= 2007 Tasmania Challenge =

2007 Supercar Championship event

2007 Falken Tasmania Challenge
Event Information
- Round 13 of 14 in the 2007 V8 Supercar Championship Series
- Date: 16–18 November 2007
- Location: Launceston, Tasmania
- Venue: Symmons Plains Raceway
- Weather: Fine

Results
Race 1
Distance	50 laps	120 km
Pole position	Garth Tander; HSV Dealer Team	51.5657
Winner	Garth Tander; HSV Dealer Team	46:49.7607
Race 2
Distance	50 laps	120 km
Winner	Jamie Whincup; Triple Eight Race Engineering	45:48.4359
Race 3
Distance	50 laps	120 km
Winner	Jamie Whincup; Triple Eight Race Engineering	53:44.3419
Round Results
First	Jamie Whincup; Triple Eight Race Engineering	68 pts
Second	Steven Richards; Ford Performance Racing	55 pts
Third	Mark Winterbottom; Ford Performance Racing	45 pts

The 2007 Tasmania Challenge (known for naming rights reasons as the 2007 Falken Tasmania Challenge) was the thirteenth round of the 2007 V8 Supercar Championship Series. It was held on the weekend of the 16 to 18 November at Symmons Plains Raceway in Launceston, Tasmania.

Jamie Whincup won the second and third races of the weekend en route to taking overall round honours, and in doing so, usurped Garth Tander as the championship leader heading into the final round at Phillip Island. Tander himself had taken pole position and won race one. However, the HSV Dealer Team driver endured a tough couple of races and the 36-point swing was enough for him to lose the championship lead.

== Race report ==
=== Race 1 ===
Pos	No	Driver	Team	Car	Laps	Time/Retired	Grid
1	16	(Australia) Garth Tander	HSV Dealer Team	Holden Commodore (VE)	50		
2	88	(Australia) Jamie Whincup	Triple Eight Race Engineering	Ford Falcon (BF)	50		
3	5	(Australia) Mark Winterbottom	Ford Performance Racing	Ford Falcon (BF)	50		
4	6	(New Zealand) Steven Richards	Ford Performance Racing	Ford Falcon (BF)	50		
5	888	(Australia) Craig Lowndes	Triple Eight Race Engineering	Ford Falcon (BF)	50		
6	1	(Australia) Rick Kelly	HSV Dealer Team	Holden Commodore (VE)	50		
7	2	(Australia) Mark Skaife	Holden Racing Team	Holden Commodore (VE)	50		
8	17	(Australia) Steven Johnson	Dick Johnson Racing	Ford Falcon (BF)	50		
9	18	(Australia) Will Davison	Dick Johnson Racing	Ford Falcon (BF)	50		
10	3	(New Zealand) Jason Richards	Tasman Motorsport	Holden Commodore (VE)	50		
11	51	(New Zealand) Greg Murphy	Tasman Motorsport	Holden Commodore (VE)	50		
12	22	(Australia) Todd Kelly	Holden Racing Team	Holden Commodore (VE)	50		
13	20	(Australia) Paul Dumbrell	Paul Weel Racing	Holden Commodore (VE)	50		
14	11	(Australia) Marcus Marshall	Perkins Engineering	Holden Commodore (VE)	50		
15	55	(Australia) Steve Owen	Rod Nash Racing	Holden Commodore (VZ)	50		
16	9	(Australia) Russell Ingall	Stone Brothers Racing	Ford Falcon (BF)	50		
17	25	(Australia) Jason Bright	Britek Motorsport	Ford Falcon (BF)	50		
18	39	(Australia) Owen Kelly	Paul Morris Motorsport	Holden Commodore (VZ)	50		
19	50	(Australia) Cameron McConville	Paul Weel Racing	Holden Commodore (VE)	50		
20	34	(Australia) Dean Canto	Garry Rogers Motorsport	Holden Commodore (VE)	50		
21	12	(Australia) Andrew Jones	Brad Jones Racing	Ford Falcon (BF)	50		
22	14	(New Zealand) Simon Wills	Brad Jones Racing	Ford Falcon (BF)	50		
23	10	(Australia) Jason Bargwanna	WPS Racing	Ford Falcon (BF)	50		
24	021	(New Zealand) Shane van Gisbergen	Team Kiwi Racing	Ford Falcon (BF)	50		
25	26	(Australia) Alan Gurr	Britek Motorsport	Ford Falcon (BF)	50		
26	8	(Brazil) Max Wilson	WPS Racing	Ford Falcon (BF)	50		
27	111	(Australia) John Bowe	Paul Cruickshank Racing	Ford Falcon (BF)	49	+ 1 lap	
28	4	(Australia) James Courtney	Stone Brothers Racing	Ford Falcon (BF)	47	+ 3 laps	
Ret	7	(Australia) Shane Price	Perkins Engineering	Holden Commodore (VE)	35	Retired	
Ret	67	(Australia) Paul Morris	Paul Morris Motorsport	Holden Commodore (VE)	23	Retired	
Ret	33	(Australia) Lee Holdsworth	Garry Rogers Motorsport	Holden Commodore (VE)	10	Retired	
Fastest Lap: Garth Tander (HSV Dealer Team) - 52.3245 on lap 6

=== Race 2 ===
Pos	No	Driver	Team	Car	Laps	Time/Retired	Grid
1	88	(Australia) Jamie Whincup	Triple Eight Race Engineering	Ford Falcon (BF)	50		
2	6	(New Zealand) Steven Richards	Ford Performance Racing	Ford Falcon (BF)	50		
3	5	(Australia) Mark Winterbottom	Ford Performance Racing	Ford Falcon (BF)	50		
4	2	(Australia) Mark Skaife	Holden Racing Team	Holden Commodore (VE)	50		
5	1	(Australia) Rick Kelly	HSV Dealer Team	Holden Commodore (VE)	50		
6	888	(Australia) Craig Lowndes	Triple Eight Race Engineering	Ford Falcon (BF)	50		
7	3	(New Zealand) Jason Richards	Tasman Motorsport	Holden Commodore (VE)	50		
8	4	(Australia) James Courtney	Stone Brothers Racing	Ford Falcon (BF)	50		
9	17	(Australia) Steven Johnson	Dick Johnson Racing	Ford Falcon (BF)	50		
10	16	(Australia) Garth Tander	HSV Dealer Team	Holden Commodore (VE)	50		
11	18	(Australia) Will Davison	Dick Johnson Racing	Ford Falcon (BF)	50		
12	34	(Australia) Dean Canto	Garry Rogers Motorsport	Holden Commodore (VE)	50		
13	33	(Australia) Lee Holdsworth	Garry Rogers Motorsport	Holden Commodore (VE)	50		
14	11	(Australia) Marcus Marshall	Perkins Engineering	Holden Commodore (VE)	50		
15	021	(New Zealand) Shane van Gisbergen	Team Kiwi Racing	Ford Falcon (BF)	50		
16	20	(Australia) Paul Dumbrell	Paul Weel Racing	Holden Commodore (VE)	50		
17	8	(Brazil) Max Wilson	WPS Racing	Ford Falcon (BF)	50		
18	25	(Australia) Jason Bright	Britek Motorsport	Ford Falcon (BF)	50		
19	111	(Australia) John Bowe	Paul Cruickshank Racing	Ford Falcon (BF)	50		
20	22	(Australia) Todd Kelly	Holden Racing Team	Holden Commodore (VE)	50		
21	67	(Australia) Paul Morris	Paul Morris Motorsport	Holden Commodore (VE)	50		
22	51	(New Zealand) Greg Murphy	Tasman Motorsport	Holden Commodore (VE)	50		
23	10	(Australia) Jason Bargwanna	WPS Racing	Ford Falcon (BF)	49	+ 1 lap	
24	14	(New Zealand) Simon Wills	Brad Jones Racing	Ford Falcon (BF)	49	+ 1 lap	
25	55	(Australia) Steve Owen	Rod Nash Racing	Holden Commodore (VZ)	49	+ 1 lap	
26	7	(Australia) Shane Price	Perkins Engineering	Holden Commodore (VE)	49	+ 1 lap	
27	12	(Australia) Andrew Jones	Brad Jones Racing	Ford Falcon (BF)	49	+ 1 lap	
28	39	(Australia) Owen Kelly	Paul Morris Motorsport	Holden Commodore (VZ)	49	+ 1 lap	
29	26	(Australia) Alan Gurr	Britek Motorsport	Ford Falcon (BF)	48	+ 2 laps	
30	9	(Australia) Russell Ingall	Stone Brothers Racing	Ford Falcon (BF)	48	+ 2 laps	
Ret	50	(Australia) Cameron McConville	Paul Weel Racing	Holden Commodore (VE)	3	Retired	
Fastest Lap: Garth Tander (HSV Dealer Team) - 52.2680 on lap 11

=== Race 3 ===
Pos	No	Driver	Team	Car	Laps	Time/Retired	Grid
1	88	(Australia) Jamie Whincup	Triple Eight Race Engineering	Ford Falcon (BF)	50		
2	6	(New Zealand) Steven Richards	Ford Performance Racing	Ford Falcon (BF)	50		
3	3	(New Zealand) Jason Richards	Tasman Motorsport	Holden Commodore (VE)	50		
4	2	(Australia) Mark Skaife	Holden Racing Team	Holden Commodore (VE)	50		
5	888	(Australia) Craig Lowndes	Triple Eight Race Engineering	Ford Falcon (BF)	50		
6	4	(Australia) James Courtney	Stone Brothers Racing	Ford Falcon (BF)	50		
7	5	(Australia) Mark Winterbottom	Ford Performance Racing	Ford Falcon (BF)	50		
8	17	(Australia) Steven Johnson	Dick Johnson Racing	Ford Falcon (BF)	50		
9	25	(Australia) Jason Bright	Britek Motorsport	Ford Falcon (BF)	50		
10	34	(Australia) Dean Canto	Garry Rogers Motorsport	Holden Commodore (VE)	50		
11	67	(Australia) Paul Morris	Paul Morris Motorsport	Holden Commodore (VE)	50		
12	33	(Australia) Lee Holdsworth	Garry Rogers Motorsport	Holden Commodore (VE)	50		
13	9	(Australia) Russell Ingall	Stone Brothers Racing	Ford Falcon (BF)	50		
14	18	(Australia) Will Davison	Dick Johnson Racing	Ford Falcon (BF)	50		
15	51	(New Zealand) Greg Murphy	Tasman Motorsport	Holden Commodore (VE)	50		
16	11	(Australia) Marcus Marshall	Perkins Engineering	Holden Commodore (VE)	50		
17	111	(Australia) John Bowe	Paul Cruickshank Racing	Ford Falcon (BF)	50		
18	021	(New Zealand) Shane van Gisbergen	Team Kiwi Racing	Ford Falcon (BF)	50		
19	8	(Brazil) Max Wilson	WPS Racing	Ford Falcon (BF)	50		
20	26	(Australia) Alan Gurr	Britek Motorsport	Ford Falcon (BF)	43	+ 7 laps	
Ret	16	(Australia) Garth Tander	HSV Dealer Team	Holden Commodore (VE)	38	Retired	
Ret	14	(New Zealand) Simon Wills	Brad Jones Racing	Ford Falcon (BF)	38	Retired	
Ret	20	(Australia) Paul Dumbrell	Paul Weel Racing	Holden Commodore (VE)	38	Retired	
Ret	39	(Australia) Owen Kelly	Paul Morris Motorsport	Holden Commodore (VZ)	38	Retired	
Ret	22	(Australia) Todd Kelly	Holden Racing Team	Holden Commodore (VE)	37	Retired	
Ret	7	(Australia) Shane Price	Perkins Engineering	Holden Commodore (VE)	37	Retired	
Ret	10	(Australia) Jason Bargwanna	WPS Racing	Ford Falcon (BF)	33	Retired	
Ret	55	(Australia) Steve Owen	Rod Nash Racing	Holden Commodore (VZ)	26	Retired	
Ret	1	(Australia) Rick Kelly	HSV Dealer Team	Holden Commodore (VE)	21	Retired	
Ret	12	(Australia) Andrew Jones	Brad Jones Racing	Ford Falcon (BF)	1	Retired	
DNS	50	(Australia) Cameron McConville	Paul Weel Racing	Holden Commodore (VE)		Did not start	
Fastest Lap: Garth Tander (HSV Dealer Team) - 52.4365 on lap 6
