= 2004 V8 Supercars Oran Park round =

Motor race

(New South Wales) 2004 V8 Supercars Oran Park round
Event Information
- Round 8 of 13 in the 2004 V8 Supercar Championship Series
- Date: 13–15 August 2004
- Location: Sydney, New South Wales
- Venue: Oran Park Raceway
- Weather: Saturday: Overcast; Sunday: Sunny

Results
Race 1
Distance	54 laps	150 km
Pole position	Mark Skaife; Holden Racing Team	1:09.1107
Winner	Mark Skaife; Holden Racing Team	01:05:46.1497
Race 2
Distance	54 laps	150 km
Winner	Marcos Ambrose; Stone Brothers Racing	01:04:39.5906
Round Results
First	Marcos Ambrose; Stone Brothers Racing	189 pts
Second	Mark Skaife; Holden Racing Team	189 pts
Third	Jason Bright; Paul Weel Racing	177 pts

The 2004 V8 Supercars Oran Park round was the eighth round of the 2004 V8 Supercar Championship Series. It was held on the weekend of 13 to 15 August at the Oran Park Raceway in Narellan, New South Wales.

Mark Skaife bounced back from a turbulent time in the championship to take pole position and win the first race of the weekend. He would also finish second in the following races, finishing in behind Marcos Ambrose. With both drivers claiming a win and second-placing each, Skaife and Ambrose finished equal on points with Ambrose being awarded overall round honours by virtue of winning the last race of the weekend.

== Background ==
The event was held on the weekend of 13 to 15 August 2004. It was the 33rd ATCC/V8 Supercar event to be held at Oran Park Raceway and consisted of two 150 km races with compulsory pitstops each.

During the weekend, Jason Bright suffered an engine failure during Friday practice. A few corners into his outlap, the throttle jammed open and pitched Bright off the road. Extensive diagnosis uncovered the cause of the issue stemmed from bolts let on top of the piston that had jammed the engine. Seeing as how the bolts in question were not a part of the engine bay, it was deduced by Paul Weel Racing team principal Kees Weel that they had been deliberately put there in an act of sabotage. To this day, the true reasoning has never been uncovered.

=== Entry list ===
There were 35 drivers entered into the event. It featured mixture of vehicle models - one AU Ford Falcon, fifteen BA Falcon's, sixteen VY Commodore's, and three VX Commodore's.

Fabian Coulthard made his V8 Supercar debut with Tasman Motorsport driving a VX Commodore. Teammate and regular Tasman Motorsport driver Jason Richards would also debut a brand-new VY Commodore for the team.

== Race report ==
=== Qualifying ===
Rick Kelly claimed provisional pole position over Marcos Ambrose by one tenth of a second. John Bowe was excluded from the results owing to a technical infringement.

Pos	No	Driver	Team	Vehicle	Time
1	15	(Australia) Rick Kelly	John Kelly Racing	Holden Commodore (VY)	1:08.7205
2	1	(Australia) Marcos Ambrose	Stone Brothers Racing	Ford Falcon (BA)	1:08.8269
3	2	(Australia) Mark Skaife	Holden Racing Team	Holden Commodore (VY)	1:08.9250
4	50	(Australia) Jason Bright	Paul Weel Racing	Holden Commodore (VY)	1:08.9880
5	29	(Australia) Paul Morris	Paul Morris Motorsport	Holden Commodore (VY)	1:09.0533
6	44	(New Zealand) Simon Wills	Team Dynamik	Holden Commodore (VY)	1:09.0538
7	9	(Australia) Russell Ingall	Stone Brothers Racing	Ford Falcon (BA)	1:09.0645
8	3	(New Zealand) Jason Richards	Tasman Motorsport	Holden Commodore (VY)	1:09.1197
9	51	(New Zealand) Greg Murphy	John Kelly Racing	Holden Commodore (VY)	1:09.1616
10	22	(Australia) Todd Kelly	Holden Racing Team	Holden Commodore (VY)	1:09.1640
11	34	(Australia) Garth Tander	Garry Rogers Motorsport	Holden Commodore (VY)	1:09.1807
12	33	(Australia) Cameron McConville	Garry Rogers Motorsport	Holden Commodore (VY)	1:09.2391
13	23	(Australia) David Besnard	WPS Racing	Ford Falcon (BA)	1:09.2607
14	888	(Brazil) Max Wilson	Triple Eight Race Engineering	Ford Falcon (BA)	1:09.2641
15	11	(New Zealand) Steven Richards	Perkins Engineering	Holden Commodore (VY)	1:09.2981
16	10	(Australia) Jason Bargwanna	Larkham Motorsport	Ford Falcon (BA)	1:09.3148
17	17	(Australia) Steven Johnson	Dick Johnson Racing	Ford Falcon (BA)	1:09.3518
18	31	(Australia) Steven Ellery	Steven Ellery Racing	Ford Falcon (BA)	1:09.5242
19	6	(Australia) Craig Lowndes	Ford Performance Racing	Ford Falcon (BA)	1:09.6125
20	5	(Australia) Glenn Seton	Ford Performance Racing	Ford Falcon (BA)	1:09.6583
21	21	(Australia) Brad Jones	Brad Jones Racing	Ford Falcon (BA)	1:09.6983
22	16	(Australia) Paul Weel	Paul Weel Racing	Holden Commodore (VY)	1:09.7014
23	021	(New Zealand) Craig Baird	Team Kiwi Racing	Holden Commodore (VY)	1:09.7189
24	88	(New Zealand) Paul Radisich	Triple Eight Race Engineering	Ford Falcon (BA)	1:09.7480
25	20	(Australia) Mark Winterbottom	Larkham Motorsport	Ford Falcon (BA)	1:09.7879
26	7	(Australia) Tony Longhurst	Rod Nash Racing	Holden Commodore (VX)	1:09.9444
27	43	(New Zealand) Fabian Coulthard	Tasman Motorsport	Holden Commodore (VX)	1:09.9467
28	14	(Australia) Will Davison	Team Dynamik	Holden Commodore (VY)	1:09.9765
29	18	(Australia) Warren Luff	Dick Johnson Racing	Ford Falcon (BA)	1:10.0110
30	45	(Australia) Dale Brede	Team Dynamik	Holden Commodore (VY)	1:10.1043
31	48	(Australia) Mark Noske	WPS Racing	Ford Falcon (BA)	1:10.2073
32	8	(Australia) Paul Dumbrell	Perkins Engineering	Holden Commodore (VY)	1:10.2349
33	75	(Australia) Anthony Tratt	Paul Little Racing	Holden Commodore (VY)	1:10.5559
34	24	(Australia) Garth Walden	Walden Motorsport	Ford Falcon (AU)	1:10.8383
EXC	12	(Australia) John Bowe	Brad Jones Racing	Ford Falcon (BA)	time excluded

=== Top ten shootout ===
Pos	No	Driver	Team	Vehicle	Time
1	2	(Australia) Mark Skaife	Holden Racing Team	Holden Commodore (VY)	1:09.1107
2	22	(Australia) Todd Kelly	Holden Racing Team	Holden Commodore (VY)	1:09.3785
3	44	(New Zealand) Simon Wills	Team Dynamik	Holden Commodore (VY)	1:09.4379
4	3	(New Zealand) Jason Richards	Tasman Motorsport	Holden Commodore (VY)	1:09.4885
5	1	(Australia) Marcos Ambrose	Stone Brothers Racing	Ford Falcon (BA)	1:09.5286
6	50	(Australia) Jason Bright	Paul Weel Racing	Holden Commodore (VY)	1:09.5902
7	29	(Australia) Paul Morris	Paul Morris Motorsport	Holden Commodore (VY)	1:09.7262
8	15	(Australia) Rick Kelly	John Kelly Racing	Holden Commodore (VY)	1:09.8503
9	9	(Australia) Russell Ingall	Stone Brothers Racing	Ford Falcon (BA)	1:09.8594
10	51	(New Zealand) Greg Murphy	John Kelly Racing	Holden Commodore (VY)	1:10.0653

=== Race 1 ===
Pos	No	Driver	Team	Car	Laps	Time/Retired	Grid
1	2	(Australia) Mark Skaife	Holden Racing Team	Holden Commodore (VY)	54	01:05:46.1497	1
2	1	(Australia) Marcos Ambrose	Stone Brothers Racing	Ford Falcon (BA)	54	+ 2.791	5
3	9	(Australia) Russell Ingall	Stone Brothers Racing	Ford Falcon (BA)	54	+ 16.758	9
4	50	(Australia) Jason Bright	Paul Weel Racing	Holden Commodore (VY)	54	+ 17.658	6
5	22	(Australia) Todd Kelly	Holden Racing Team	Holden Commodore (VY)	54	+ 31.633	2
6	10	(Australia) Jason Bargwanna	Larkham Motorsport	Ford Falcon (BA)	54	+ 32.205	16
7	3	(New Zealand) Jason Richards	Tasman Motorsport	Holden Commodore (VY)	54	+ 32.435	4
8	33	(Australia) Cameron McConville	Garry Rogers Motorsport	Holden Commodore (VY)	54	+ 32.667	12
9	16	(Australia) Paul Weel	Paul Weel Racing	Holden Commodore (VY)	54	+ 32.979	22
10	11	(New Zealand) Steven Richards	Perkins Engineering	Holden Commodore (VY)	54	+ 33.101	15
11	51	(New Zealand) Greg Murphy	John Kelly Racing	Holden Commodore (VY)	54	+ 37.513	10
12	12	(Australia) John Bowe	Brad Jones Racing	Ford Falcon (BA)	54	+ 39.836	35
13	29	(Australia) Paul Morris	Paul Morris Motorsport	Holden Commodore (VY)	54	+ 42.943	7
14	88	(New Zealand) Paul Radisich	Triple Eight Race Engineering	Ford Falcon (BA)	54	+ 43.979	24
15	44	(New Zealand) Simon Wills	Team Dynamik	Holden Commodore (VY)	54	+ 46.728	3
16	7	(Australia) Tony Longhurst	Rod Nash Racing	Holden Commodore (VX)	54	+ 51.615	26
17	31	(Australia) Steven Ellery	Steven Ellery Racing	Ford Falcon (BA)	54	+ 52.131	18
18	8	(Australia) Paul Dumbrell	Perkins Engineering	Holden Commodore (VY)	54	+ 52.931	32
19	6	(Australia) Craig Lowndes	Ford Performance Racing	Ford Falcon (BA)	54	+ 52.941	19
20	21	(Australia) Brad Jones	Brad Jones Racing	Ford Falcon (BA)	54	+ 53.167	21
21	34	(Australia) Garth Tander	Garry Rogers Motorsport	Holden Commodore (VY)	54	+ 53.751	11
22	75	(Australia) Anthony Tratt	Paul Little Racing	Holden Commodore (VY)	54	+ 59.108	33
23	20	(Australia) Mark Winterbottom	Larkham Motorsport	Ford Falcon (BA)	54	+ 59.765	25
24	18	(Australia) Warren Luff	Dick Johnson Racing	Ford Falcon (BA)	54	+ 1:00.063	29
25	45	(Australia) Dale Brede	Team Dynamik	Holden Commodore (VY)	54	+ 1:00.648	30
26	23	(Australia) David Besnard	WPS Racing	Ford Falcon (BA)	54	+ 1:11.647	13
27	48	(Australia) Mark Noske	WPS Racing	Ford Falcon (BA)	53	+ 1 lap	31
28	24	(Australia) Garth Walden	Walden Motorsport	Ford Falcon (AU)	53	+ 1 lap	34
29	43	(New Zealand) Fabian Coulthard	Tasman Motorsport	Holden Commodore (VX)	53	+ 1 lap	27
30	15	(Australia) Rick Kelly	John Kelly Racing	Holden Commodore (VY)	52	+ 2 laps	8
31	021	(New Zealand) Craig Baird	Team Kiwi Racing	Holden Commodore (VY)	52	+ 2 laps	23
32	17	(Australia) Steven Johnson	Dick Johnson Racing	Ford Falcon (BA)	43	+ 11 laps	17
Ret	888	(Australia) Max Wilson	Triple Eight Race Engineering	Ford Falcon (BA)	20	Accident damage	14
DNS	14	(Australia) Will Davison	Team Dynamik	Holden Commodore (VY)		Did not start	28
Fastest Lap: Mark Skaife (Holden Racing Team) - 1:09.5756 on lap 3

=== Race 2 ===
Pos	No	Driver	Team	Car	Laps	Time/Retired	Grid
1	1	(Australia) Marcos Ambrose	Stone Brothers Racing	Ford Falcon (BA)	54	01:04:39.5906	2
2	2	(Australia) Mark Skaife	Holden Racing Team	Holden Commodore (VY)	54	+ 4.372	1
3	50	(Australia) Jason Bright	Paul Weel Racing	Holden Commodore (VY)	54	+ 27.182	4
4	9	(Australia) Russell Ingall	Stone Brothers Racing	Ford Falcon (BA)	54	+ 32.742	3
5	16	(Australia) Paul Weel	Paul Weel Racing	Holden Commodore (VY)	54	+ 35.266	9
6	44	(New Zealand) Simon Wills	Team Dynamik	Holden Commodore (VY)	54	+ 39.313	15
7	22	(Australia) Todd Kelly	Holden Racing Team	Holden Commodore (VY)	54	+ 43.283	5
8	3	(New Zealand) Jason Richards	Tasman Motorsport	Holden Commodore (VY)	54	+ 43.836	7
9	15	(Australia) Rick Kelly	John Kelly Racing	Holden Commodore (VY)	54	+ 54.059	30
10	29	(Australia) Paul Morris	Paul Morris Motorsport	Holden Commodore (VY)	54	+ 59.188	13
11	11	(New Zealand) Steven Richards	Perkins Engineering	Holden Commodore (VY)	54	+ 1:01.486	10
12	51	(New Zealand) Greg Murphy	John Kelly Racing	Holden Commodore (VY)	54	+ 1:02.731	11
13	88	(New Zealand) Paul Radisich	Triple Eight Race Engineering	Ford Falcon (BA)	53	+ 1 lap	14
14	10	(Australia) Jason Bargwanna	Larkham Motorsport	Ford Falcon (BA)	53	+ 1 lap	6
15	021	(New Zealand) Craig Baird	Team Kiwi Racing	Holden Commodore (VY)	53	+ 1 lap	31
16	7	(Australia) Tony Longhurst	Rod Nash Racing	Holden Commodore (VX)	53	+ 1 lap	16
17	17	(Australia) Steven Johnson	Dick Johnson Racing	Ford Falcon (BA)	53	+ 1 lap	32
18	12	(Australia) John Bowe	Brad Jones Racing	Ford Falcon (BA)	53	+ 1 lap	12
19	43	(New Zealand) Fabian Coulthard	Tasman Motorsport	Holden Commodore (VX)	53	+ 1 lap	29
20	18	(Australia) Warren Luff	Dick Johnson Racing	Ford Falcon (BA)	53	+ 1 lap	24
22	33	(Australia) Cameron McConville	Garry Rogers Motorsport	Holden Commodore (VY)	53	+ 1 lap	8
23	8	(Australia) Paul Dumbrell	Perkins Engineering	Holden Commodore (VY)	53	+ 1 lap	18
24	75	(Australia) Anthony Tratt	Paul Little Racing	Holden Commodore (VY)	53	+ 1 lap	22
25	45	(Australia) Dale Brede	Team Dynamik	Holden Commodore (VY)	52	+ 2 laps	25
26	6	(Australia) Craig Lowndes	Ford Performance Racing	Ford Falcon (BA)	52	+ 2 laps	19
27	48	(Australia) Mark Noske	WPS Racing	Ford Falcon (BA)	52	+ 2 laps	27
28	34	(Australia) Garth Tander	Garry Rogers Motorsport	Holden Commodore (VY)	52	+ 2 laps	21
29	31	(Australia) Steven Ellery	Steven Ellery Racing	Ford Falcon (BA)	51	+ 3 laps	17
30	23	(Australia) David Besnard	WPS Racing	Ford Falcon (BA)	51	+ 3 laps	26
31	21	(Australia) Brad Jones	Brad Jones Racing	Ford Falcon (BA)	47	+ 7 laps	20
Ret	888	(Australia) Max Wilson	Triple Eight Race Engineering	Ford Falcon (BA)	38	Retired	33
Ret	20	(Australia) Mark Winterbottom	Larkham Motorsport	Ford Falcon (BA)	11	Retired	23
Ret	24	(Australia) Garth Walden	Walden Motorsport	Ford Falcon (AU)	1	Engine	28
DSQ	14	(Australia) Will Davison	Team Dynamik	Holden Commodore (VY)		Disqualified	34
Fastest Lap: Simon Wills (Team Dynamik) - 1:09.9280 on lap 30

== Championship standings ==
Pos.	No	Driver	Team	Pts
1	50	(Australia) Jason Bright	Paul Weel Racing	1308
2	1	(Australia) Marcos Ambrose	Stone Brothers Racing	1295
3	11	(New Zealand) Steven Richards	Perkins Engineering	1261
4	15	(Australia) Rick Kelly	John Kelly Racing	1197
5	9	(Australia) Russell Ingall	Stone Brothers Racing	1159
