= 2007 Australian Production Car Championship =

The 2007 Australian Production Car Championship was a CAMS sanctioned Australian motor racing title open to Group 3E Series Production Cars. The championship, which was administered by the Production Car Association of Australia, was promoted as the Shannons Australian Production Car Championship. It was the 14th Australian Production Car Championship.

The championship was won Garry Holt driving a BMW 335i. It was the second national title in as many years for Holt who had previously won the 2006 Australian Performance Car Championship. Holt finished 50 points clear of his team-mate Barry Morcom, also driving a BMW 335i. Morcom won a season long battle with Holden Commodore driver Steve Briffa for the runner-up position in the championship.

== Calendar ==
The championship was contested over an eight round series.

Round	Name	Circuit	Date	Format	Round winner	Car	Report
1	WPS Bathurst 12 Hour	Mount Panorama	7–8 April	One race	Garry Holt	BMW 335i	Report
2		Phillip Island	5–6 May	Three races	Leigh Mertens	HSV VY GTS	
3		Queensland Raceway	26–27 May	Three races	Garry Holt	BMW 335i	
4		Eastern Creek	14–15 July	Three races	Garry Holt	BMW 335i	
5		Phillip Island	11–12 August	Three races	Steve Briffa	Holden VZ Commodore SSZ	
6	Shannons 250	Mallala	13–14 October	Three races	Garry Holt	BMW 335i	
7		Oran Park	3–4 November	Three races	Steve Briffa	Holden VZ Commodore SSZ	
8		Sandown Raceway	8–9 December	Two races	Leigh Mertens	HSV VZ	

== Class Structure ==
Cars competed in five classes:

- Class SP – for "Super Production" Cars
- Class A – for V8 and turbocharged six cylinder cars
- Class B – for medium cars including high performance fours and smaller turbocharged cars
- Class C – for small cars
- Class D – for diesel engined cars

Additional entries, competing without a Production Car Association License Agreement, contested two Trophy classes, “SP Trophy”, (for cars in Super Production) and “Trophy” (for cars in Classes A, B or C). Drivers of SP Trophy and Trophy class cars were not eligible to score championship points.

== Points system ==
Championship points for both outright and classes were awarded on a 30-25-22-20-18-16-14-12-10-8-6-4-2-1 basis for the first 14 finishers in each race. One point was awarded to all other finishers. Bonus points were also awarded at Round 1 according to the outright finishing order of competitors that were registered for the championship.

The fastest qualifying driver in each Class of the qualifying session was awarded 3 points towards their class points score.

To be eligible to score points at any rounds of the championship the driver was required to be a current financial member of the Production Car Association of Australia.

Any seven rounds were counted towards the championship.

Drivers registered as Trophy competitors were not eligible to score championship points, but competed for two separate Trophy class awards. Points towards the two season class awards were allocated on a 5-4-6-2-1- basis for the first five positions in each class at each race, with one point given to each of the other finishers.

== Results ==
=== Outright ===
Position	Driver	No.	Car	Entrant	Points
1	Garry Holt	20	BMW 335i	Eastern Creek Karts	376
2	Barry Morcom	17	BMW 335i	Rondo/Charsam/P & I Smash	326
3	Steve Briffa	8	Holden VZ Commodore SSZ	Paul Wakeling Holden	322
4	Leigh Mertens	7	HSV VY GTS & HSV VZ	G & D Performance	286
5	Chris Delfsma	21	Ford BF Falcon XR8	Century 21 Hazelbrook	240
6	Trevor Keene	50	Mini Cooper S	Med West Multimedia	184
7	Luke Searle	3	BMW 130i	S.A.E. College	149
8	Garth Walden	24	Holden VY Commodore SS	Walden Motorsport	140
9	David Mertens	77	Proton Satria GTi	RHM Group	126
10	Kean Booker	72	Toyota Celica	Thrifty Car Rentals	111
11	Peter Kelly	88	BMW 130i	KEL Technologies	103
12	Alan Shephard	27	Mazda 3 MPS	Thrifty Car Rentals	102
13	Andrew Moffat	9	BMW 130i	Australian Motor Finance	82
14	Colin Osborne	13	Toyota Celica SX	Osborne Motorsport	67
15	Andrew Bretherton	50	Mini Cooper S	Med West Multimedia	62
16	Alan Letcher	99	Ford BF Falcon XR6 Turbo	Team Queensland Racing	52
16	David Turner	99	Ford BF Falcon XR6 Turbo	Team Queensland Racing	52
16	Nathan Callaghan	99	Ford BF Falcon XR6 Turbo	Team Queensland Racing	52
19	David Giugni	50	Mini Cooper S	Med West Multimedia	52
20	Iain Sherrin	11	BMW 120i	Sherrin Motorsport	47
20	Grant Sherrin	11	BMW 120i	Sherrin Motorsport	47
22	Peter Conroy	14	Honda Integra Type S	Hankook Tyres/DBA	42
23	Jim Hunter	34	Subaru Impreza	Jim Hunters Suspension	38
24	Adam Graham	66	BMW 130i	Sherrin Motorsport	32
25	Lauren Gray	15	Toyota Echo	Kingville Accident Repairs	30
26	Brain Walden	24	Holden VY Commodore SS	Wilsons Solicitors & Accountants	28
27	Michael Craig	1	Ford Falcon XR6 Turbo	Armour Automotive	26
28	Tim Robson	50	Mini Cooper S	Med West Multimedia	20
29	Len Cave	72	Toyota Celica	Thrifty Car Rentals	16

=== Classes ===
Position	Driver	No.	Car	Entrant	Points
Super Production
1	Garry Holt	20	BMW 335i	Eastern Creek Karts	598
2	Barry Morcom	17	BMW 335i	Rondo/Charsam/P & I Smash	532
3	Leigh Mertens	7	HSV VY GTS & HSV VZ	G & D Performance	376
Class A
1	Steve Briffa	8	Holden VZ Commodore SSZ	Paul Wakeling Holden	606
2	Chris Delfsma	21	Ford BF Falcon XR8	Century 21 Hazelbrook	480
3	Garth Walden	24	Holden VY Commodore SS	Walden Motorsport	299
4	Luke Searle	3	BMW 130i	S.A.E. College	245
5	Alan Shephard	27	Mazda 3 MPS	Thrifty Car Rentals	232
6	Peter Kelly	88	BMW 130i	KEL Technologies	149
7	Andrew Moffat	9	BMW 130i	Australian Motor Finance	96
8	Alan Letcher	99	Ford BF Falcon XR6 Turbo	Team Queensland Racing	77
8	David Turner	99	Ford BF Falcon XR6 Turbo	Team Queensland Racing	77
8	Nathan Callaghan	99	Ford BF Falcon XR6 Turbo	Team Queensland Racing	77
11	Brain Walden	24	Holden VY Commodore SS	Wilsons Solicitors & Accountants	69
12	Adam Graham	66	BMW 130i	Sherrin Motorsport	67
13	Michael Craig	1	Ford Falcon XR6 Turbo	Armour Automotive	66
Class B
1	Trevor Keene	50	Mini Cooper S	Med West Multimedia	444
2	Kean Booker	72	Toyota Celica	Thrifty Car Rentals	165
3	David Giugni	50	Mini Cooper S	Med West Multimedia	118
4	Colin Osborne	13	Toyota Celica SX	Osborne Motorsport	96
5	Andrew Bretherton	50	Mini Cooper S	Med West Multimedia	90
6	David Mertens	31	Toyota Celica SX	Osborne Motorsport	88
7	Leigh Mertens	31	Toyota Celica SX	Osborne Motorsport	82
7	Tim Robson	40	BMW 323i	Dayco / Wesfil	82
8	Peter Conroy	14	Honda Integra Type S	Hankook Tyres/DBA	77
9	Len Cave	72	Toyota Celica	Thrifty Car Rentals	63
Class C
1	David Mertens	77	Proton Satria GTi	RHM Group	178
2	Jim Hunter	34	Subaru Impreza	Jim Hunters Suspension	113
3	Iain Sherrin	11	BMW 120i	Sherrin Motorsport	96
4	Grant Sherrin	11	BMW 120i	Sherrin Motorsport	96
5	Lauren Gray	15	Toyota Echo	Kingville Accident Repairs	50
6	Warren Bossie	88	Subaru Impreza	Jim Hunters Suspension	30
Class D
1	Kean Booker	76	Alfa Romeo 159	Thompson Alfa	96
2	Rocco Rinaldo	76	Alfa Romeo 159	Thompson Alfa	63
Trophy Class Point Score
SP Trophy
1	James Parish	35	Mazda RX-7	Sennheiser Audio	88
2	Marty Miller	55	HSV VT		14
Trophy
1	Amber Anderson	88	Holden Vectra	Revolution Race Gear	24
2	Matt Brady	30	Ford AU Falcon XR8	Coastal Flooring and Construct	23
3	Mike Fitzgerald	40	BMW 323i	Dayco / Wesfil	20
4	Tim Robson	40	BMW 323i	Dayco / Wesfil	15
5	Brendon Cook	4	Holden Vectra	Revolution Race Gear	14
6	Garth Duffy	40	BMW 323i	Dayco / Wesfil	14
7	Rob Rubis	40	BMW 323i	Dayco / Wesfil	13
8	Danielle Argiro	88	Holden Vectra	Paul Wakeling Holden	10
9	Garry Mennell	40	BMW 323i	Dayco/Wefil Cooper/Nippon	5
10	Richard Mork	77	Honda Integra Type R	V8Racing.com	4
