= 2007 Bathurst 12 Hour =

Endurance motor racing event

2007 WPS Bathurst 12 Hour

Seasons
- ← 1995 2008 →

Layout of the Mount Panorama Circuit

The 2007 WPS Bathurst 12 Hour was an Australian endurance race for Production Cars, held over a twelve-hour period starting from 5:45am on 8 April 2007 at the Mount Panorama Circuit, Bathurst, New South Wales. It was the fifth Bathurst 12 Hour race and the first to be staged since 1994. It was also the opening round of the 2007 Australian Production Car Championship.

The race was open to Group 3E Series Production Cars and to invited cars not eligible under Group 3E, but otherwise subject to compliance with Group 3E specifications. These included Tarmac Rally Cars built to Modern Tarmac Rally Spec Rules and cars that had competed in the Australian Performance Car Championship and the Australian Production Car Championship in the last five years. After 257 laps and 1596 kilometres of racing, Garry Holt, Paul Morris and Craig Baird claimed victory in a BMW 335i, finishing a minute and 18 seconds ahead of the Subaru Impreza WRX STi of rally drivers Chris Atkinson, Dean Herridge and Cody Crocker.

== Class structure ==
Cars competed in the following classes:

- Class A : Penrite Rear Wheel Drive Performance Cars
- Class B : Sonax All Wheel Drive Performance Cars
- Class C : APCC Hot Hatches
- Class D : APCC Production Sports and Touring Sedans
- Class E : APCC Production Hatch and Sedans
- Class F : APCC Production Micro Sports and Coupes
- Class G : Eco Diesel Over 3.5 Litre
- Class H : Eco Diesel 3.5 Litres and Under

== Results ==
Position	Drivers	No.	Car	Entrant	Class pos.	Class	Laps
1	(New Zealand) Craig Baird (Australia) Garry Holt (Australia) Paul Morris	20	BMW 335i	Eastern Creek Karts P/L	1	A	257
2	(Australia) Chris Atkinson (Australia) Cody Crocker (Australia) Dean Herridge	98	Subaru Impreza WRX Sti Spec C	Subaru Australia	1	B	257
3	(Australia) Rick Bates (Australia) Peter Gazzard (Australia) Bob Hughes	15	Mitsubishi Lancer RS Evolution VIII	Scott's Transport	2	B	253
4	(Australia) Beric Lynton (Australia) Barrie Morcom (New Zealand) Chris Pither	17	BMW 335i	Rondo	2	A	253
5	(Australia) Chris Alajajian (Australia) Neil Crompton (Australia) Grant Denyer	7	Subaru Impreza WRX Sti Spec C	Subaru Australia	3	B	248
6	(Australia) Shaun Juniper (Australia) Andrew Moffat (Australia) David Russell	9	BMW 130i	Australian Motor Finance	1	C	247
7	(Australia) Marc Cini (Australia) Mark Eddy (Australia) Dean Grant	10	BMW 130i	Bended Elbow	2	C	246
8	(Australia) Peter Kelly (Australia) Luke Searle	3	BMW 130i	SAE College	3	C	244
9	(Australia) John Bowe (Australia) Chris Delfsma (Australia) Jack Elsegood	21	Ford BF Falcon XR8	Century 21	1	D	244
10	(New Zealand) Andrew Fawcet (Australia) David Ryan (Australia) Michael Trimble	12	FPV F6 Typhoon	Robinson Racing Developments	3	A	240
11	(Australia) Neal Bates (Australia) Colin Osborne (Australia) John Roecken	13	Toyota Celica SX	Osborne Motorsport	1	E	240
12	(Australia) Andrew Bretherton (Australia) Trevor Keene (Australia) Tim Slade	50	Mini Cooper S	Mid-West Multimedia	2	E	239
13	(Australia) David Mertens (Australia) Leigh Mertens (Australia) Carl Schembri	31	Toyota Celica SX	Osborne Motorsport	3	E	238
14	(Australia) Nathan Callaghan (Australia) Allan Letcher (Australia) David Turner	99	Ford BF Falcon XR6 Turbo	Team Queensland Racing	2	D	232
15	(Australia) Jack Perkins (Australia) Nathan Pretty (Australia) Shane Price (New Zealand) Jason Richards	4	HSV VXR Coupe	Holden Motorsport	4	C	230
16	(Australia) Stuart Jones (Australia) Grant Sherrin (Australia) Iain Sherrin (Australia) Jim Wallace	11	BMW 120i	Sherrin Motorsport	1	F	226
17	(Australia) Peter Conroy (Australia) Terry Conroy (Australia) Bob Hadley	14	Honda Integra Type S	Hankook Tyres/DBA	4	E	223
18	(Australia) Paul Faulkner (Australia) Richard Howe (Australia) Dennis O'Keefe (Australia) Don Tryhorn	94	Ford BF Falcon XR6 Turbo	Aporschapart	3	D	223
19	(Australia) Phil Alexander (Australia) Gary Mennell (Australia) Shane Smollen (Australia) Paul Stubber	40	BMW 323i	Dayco/Wefil Cooper/Nippon/Max/On Track Motorsport	5	E	221
20	(Australia) Keen Booker (Australia) Rocco Rinaldo (Australia) David Stone	76	Alfa Romeo 159 2.4 JT	Thomson Alfa Romeo	1	G	218
21	(Australia) Amber Anderson (Australia) Danielle Argiro (Australia) Helen Stig	72	Toyota Celica SX	Thrifty Car Rental	6	E	211
22	(Australia) Martin Bailey (Australia) Steve Briffa (Australia) Allan Shephard	27	Mazda 3 MPS	Thrifty Car Rental	5	C	206
23	(Australia) Mark Brame (Australia) Mark King (Australia) Jason Walsh	38	Mitsubishi Lancer RS Evolution VIII	Pro-Duct Motorsport	3	B	200
24	(Australia) Michael Auld (Australia) Brian Walden (Australia) Garth Walden	24	Holden VY Commodore SS	Walden Motorsport / Syd Fab	4	D	188
25	(Australia) Richard Mork (Australia) Richard Prince (Australia) Martin Rambow (Australia) Peter Vicary	77	Honda Integra Type R	V8Racing.com	7	E	109
DNF	(Australia) Anton Mechtler (Australia) Bob Pearson (Australia) Bruce Stewart	33	Mitsubishi Lancer RS Evolution VIII	Pro-Duct Motorsport		B	200
DNF	(Australia) Warren Bossie (Australia) Jim Hunter (Australia) Jayson Williamson (Australia) Matthew Windsor	88	Subaru Impreza RS	Jim Hunter's Suspension		F	198
DNF	(Australia) Christian D'agostin (Australia) Scott Nicholas (Australia) Tim Sipp	25	Subaru Impreza WRX STi	Wilson Brothers Racing		B	194
DNF	(Australia) Lauren Gray (New Zealand) Christina Orr (Australia) Samantha Reid (Australia) Leanne Tander	6	Holden Astra CDTi Turbo	Holden Motorsport		H	136
DNF	(Australia) Denis Cribbin (Australia) Roland Hill (Australia) Paul Jenkins	66	Ford BF Falcon XR6 Turbo	Lakeside Motorsport Park		D	79
DNF	(Australia) Brad Lowe (Australia) Dean Neville (Australia) Ben Neilsen	2	FTE TE50	Kitome Pty Ltd		A	76
DNF	(Australia) Gary Deane (Australia) Rob Rubis	91	Subaru Impreza WRX STi	Gary Deane Constructions/Truffle Group Catering		B	53

Fastest lap was 2m32.5945s, recorded by Car 20 when driven by Craig Baird.
