= 2022 Bathurst 12 Hour =

Endurance racing event in Australia

(Australia) 2022 Bathurst 12 Hour
Event Information
- Round 1 of 4 in the 2022
- Date: 13–15 May 2022
- Location: Bathurst, New South Wales, Australia
- Venue: Mount Panorama Circuit

Results
Race 1
Distance	291 laps	1807.983 km
Pole position	(Australia) Chaz Mostert; CoinSpot Racing Team	2:02.4930
Winner	(Australia) Kenny Habul (France) Jules Gounon (Austria) Martin Konrad (Germany) Luca Stolz; SunEnergy1 Triple Eight Race Engineering	12:00:56.1980

The 2022 Liqui Moly Bathurst 12 Hour was an endurance race staged on the Mount Panorama Circuit in Bathurst, New South Wales, Australia, on 15 May 2022. It was the opening round of the 2022 Intercontinental GT Challenge. The race was originally planned to be held on 27 February 2022, but was postponed to May due to concerns with the COVID-19 quarantine regulations of Australia.

== Class structure ==
Entries were divided into classes based on car type and driver ratings.

- Class A – GT3 (current-specification GT3 cars)
  - Class APA (Pro-Am) - for driving combinations featuring two FIA Platinum- or FIA Gold-rated drivers and one or two FIA Bronze-rated drivers.
  - Class AAM (Am) - for driving combinations featuring at most one FIA Silver-rated driver, with the remaining drivers being FIA Bronze-rated.
- Class B – GT3 Trophy (older-specification GT3 cars)
  - Pro-Am - for driving combinations featuring at most one FIA Silver-rated driver, with the remaining drivers being FIA Bronze-rated.
  - Am - for driving combinations featuring only FIA Bronze-rated drivers.
- Class C – Porsche GT3 Cup Car
- Class D – GT4 cars
- Class I – Invitational class
  - Class I was open to MARC Cars, GT2 cars and GTC cars from one-make categories.

There were no entries in Classes B and D.

== Entry list ==
Team	Car	No.	Drivers	Class
(Australia) Grove Racing	Porsche 911 GT3 R	4	(United Kingdom) Ben Barker	APA
(Australia) Grove Racing	Porsche 911 GT3 R	4	(Australia) Brenton Grove	APA
(Australia) Grove Racing	Porsche 911 GT3 R	4	(Australia) Stephen Grove	APA
(Australia) Wall Racing	Lamborghini Huracán GT3 Evo	6	(Australia) Tony D'Alberto	APA
(Australia) Wall Racing	Lamborghini Huracán GT3 Evo	6	(Australia) Grant Denyer	APA
(Australia) Wall Racing	Lamborghini Huracán GT3 Evo	6	(Australia) Adrian Deitz	APA
(Australia) Wall Racing	Lamborghini Huracán GT3 Evo	6	(Australia) David Wall	APA
(Australia) Team Hallmarc	Audi R8 LMS Evo II	9	(Australia) Marc Cini	APA
(Australia) Team Hallmarc	Audi R8 LMS Evo II	9	(Australia) Dean Fiore	APA
(Australia) Team Hallmarc	Audi R8 LMS Evo II	9	(Australia) Lee Holdsworth	APA
(Australia) Our Kloud-UpTo11 Motorsport	Porsche 991 GT3 II Cup	11	(Australia) Eric Constantinidis	C
(Australia) Our Kloud-UpTo11 Motorsport	Porsche 991 GT3 II Cup	11	(South Africa) Indiran Padayachee	C
(Australia) Our Kloud-UpTo11 Motorsport	Porsche 991 GT3 II Cup	11	(Australia) Aaron Zerefos	C
(Australia) Team BRM	Audi R8 LMS Evo II	17	(Australia) Nick Percat	APA
(Australia) Team BRM	Audi R8 LMS Evo II	17	(Australia) Joey Mawson	APA
(Australia) Team BRM	Audi R8 LMS Evo II	17	(Australia) Mark Rosser	APA
(Australia) Nineteen Corp. Racing Team	Mercedes-AMG GT3 Evo	19	(Australia) Will Brown	APA
(Australia) Nineteen Corp. Racing Team	Mercedes-AMG GT3 Evo	19	(Australia) Mark Griffith	APA
(Australia) Nineteen Corp. Racing Team	Mercedes-AMG GT3 Evo	19	(Australia) Jack Perkins	APA
(Australia) Tony Bates Racing	Audi R8 LMS Evo II	24	(Australia) Tony Bates	APA
(Australia) Tony Bates Racing	Audi R8 LMS Evo II	24	(Australia) David Reynolds	APA
(Australia) Tony Bates Racing	Audi R8 LMS Evo II	24	(Australia) Cam Waters	APA
(Australia) RAM Motorsport	Mercedes-AMG GT3 Evo	45	(Australia) Brett Hobson	AAM
(Australia) RAM Motorsport	Mercedes-AMG GT3 Evo	45	(Australia) Michael Sheargold	AAM
(Australia) RAM Motorsport	Mercedes-AMG GT3 Evo	45	(Australia) Garth Walden	AAM
(Australia) Supabarn Motorsport	Audi R8 LMS Evo II	47	(Australia) James Koundouris	AAM
(Australia) Supabarn Motorsport	Audi R8 LMS Evo II	47	(Australia) Theo Koundouris	AAM
(Australia) Supabarn Motorsport	Audi R8 LMS Evo II	47	(Australia) David Russell	AAM
(Australia) Supabarn Motorsport	Audi R8 LMS Evo II	47	(Australia) Paul Stokell	AAM
(Australia) M Motorsport	KTM X-Bow GT2 Concept	50	(Australia) David Crampton	I
(Australia) M Motorsport	KTM X-Bow GT2 Concept	50	(Australia) Trent Harrison	I
(Australia) M Motorsport	KTM X-Bow GT2 Concept	50	(Australia) Dale Wood	I
(Australia) M Motorsport	KTM X-Bow GT2 Concept	50	(Australia) Glen Wood	I
(Papua New Guinea) Wheels/ FX Racing PNG	MARC II V8	52	(Papua New Guinea) Keith Kassulke	I
(Papua New Guinea) Wheels/ FX Racing PNG	MARC II V8	52	(Australia) Hadrian Morall	I
(Papua New Guinea) Wheels/ FX Racing PNG	MARC II V8	52	(Australia) Zane Morse	I
(Australia) Valmont Racing	Mercedes-AMG GT3	55	(Australia) Duvashen Padayachee	AAM
(Australia) Valmont Racing	Mercedes-AMG GT3	55	(Australia) Sergio Pires	AAM
(Australia) Valmont Racing	Mercedes-AMG GT3	55	(Australia) Marcel Zalloua	AAM
(Australia) CoinSpot Racing Team	Audi R8 LMS Evo II	65	(Australia) Chaz Mostert	APA
(Australia) CoinSpot Racing Team	Audi R8 LMS Evo II	65	(Australia) Fraser Ross	APA
(Australia) CoinSpot Racing Team	Audi R8 LMS Evo II	65	(Australia) Liam Talbot	APA
(Australia) Audi Sport Team Valvoline	Audi R8 LMS Evo II	74	(France) Nathanaël Berthon	APA
(Australia) Audi Sport Team Valvoline	Audi R8 LMS Evo II	74	(South Africa) Kelvin van der Linde	APA
(Australia) Audi Sport Team Valvoline	Audi R8 LMS Evo II	74	(Australia) Brad Schumacher	APA
(Australia) The Bend Motorsport Park Team Valvoline	Audi R8 LMS Evo II	777	(Switzerland) Ricardo Feller	APA
(Australia) The Bend Motorsport Park Team Valvoline	Audi R8 LMS Evo II	777	(Australia) Yasser Shahin	APA
(Australia) The Bend Motorsport Park Team Valvoline	Audi R8 LMS Evo II	777	(Germany) Markus Winkelhock	APA
(Australia) SunEnergy1 Triple Eight Race Engineering	Mercedes-AMG GT3 Evo	75	(France) Jules Gounon	APA
(Australia) SunEnergy1 Triple Eight Race Engineering	Mercedes-AMG GT3 Evo	75	(Australia) Kenny Habul	APA
(Australia) SunEnergy1 Triple Eight Race Engineering	Mercedes-AMG GT3 Evo	75	(Austria) Martin Konrad	APA
(Australia) SunEnergy1 Triple Eight Race Engineering	Mercedes-AMG GT3 Evo	75	(Germany) Luca Stolz	APA
(Australia) MANN FILTER Triple Eight Race Engineering	Mercedes-AMG GT3 Evo	888	(Australia) Broc Feeney	APA
(Australia) MANN FILTER Triple Eight Race Engineering	Mercedes-AMG GT3 Evo	888	(New Zealand) Shane van Gisbergen	APA
(Australia) MANN FILTER Triple Eight Race Engineering	Mercedes-AMG GT3 Evo	888	(Malaysia) Prince Jefri Ibrahim	APA
(Hong Kong) Mercedes-AMG Team Craft-Bamboo Racing	Mercedes-AMG GT3 Evo	91	(Germany) Maro Engel	APA
(Hong Kong) Mercedes-AMG Team Craft-Bamboo Racing	Mercedes-AMG GT3 Evo	91	(Spain) Daniel Juncadella	APA
(Hong Kong) Mercedes-AMG Team Craft-Bamboo Racing	Mercedes-AMG GT3 Evo	91	(Macau) Kevin Tse	APA
MARC Cars Australia	MARC II V8	95	(Australia) Jake Camilleri	I
MARC Cars Australia	MARC II V8	95	(Australia) Declan Fraser	I
MARC Cars Australia	MARC II V8	95	(Australia) Geoff Taunton	I
(Australia) Scott Taylor Motorsport	Porsche 991 GT3 II Cup	222	(Australia) Alex Davison	C
(Australia) Scott Taylor Motorsport	Porsche 991 GT3 II Cup	222	(Australia) Geoff Emery	C
(Australia) Scott Taylor Motorsport	Porsche 991 GT3 II Cup	222	(Australia) Craig Lowndes	C
(Australia) Scott Taylor Motorsport	Porsche 991 GT3 II Cup	222	(Australia) Scott Taylor	C

== Qualifying ==
Qualifying was split into two sessions, with Class A cars required to have an FIA Bronze-rated driver take part in the first and a higher-rated driver take part in the second. Results were formed by taking the aggregate times for each car from the two sessions. Class leaders are shown in bold.

Pos.	No.	Class	Drivers	Team	Car	Combined time	Gap
1	**65**	**APA**	**(Australia) Chaz Mostert (Australia) Liam Talbot**	**(Australia) CoinSpot Racing Team**	**Audi R8 LMS Evo II**	**4:08.5891**	
2	74	APA	(South Africa) Kelvin van der Linde (Australia) Brad Schumacher	(Australia) Audi Sport Team Valvoline	Audi R8 LMS Evo II	4:08.9259	+0.3368
3	777	APA	(Switzerland) Ricardo Feller (Australia) Yasser Shahin	(Australia) The Bend Motorsport Park Team Valvoline	Audi R8 LMS Evo II	4:09.2725	+0.6834
4	75	APA	(France) Jules Gounon (Austria) Martin Konrad	(Australia) SunEnergy1 Triple Eight Race Engineering	Mercedes-AMG GT3 Evo	4:09.7717	+1.1826
5	**45**	**AAM**	**(Australia) Garth Walden (Australia) Brett Hobson**	**(Australia) RAM Motorsport**	**Mercedes-AMG GT3 Evo**	**4:11.2251**	**+2.6660**
6	4	APA	(United Kingdom) Ben Barker (Australia) Stephen Grove	(Australia) Grove Racing	Porsche 911 GT3 R	4:12.7094	+4.1203
7	55	AAM	(Australia) Duvashen Padayachee (Australia) Sergio Pieres	(Australia) Valmont Racing	Mercedes-AMG GT3	4:13.8589	+5.2698
8	888	APA	(New Zealand) Shane van Gisbergen (Malaysia) Prince Jefri Ibrahim	(Australia) MANN FILTER Triple Eight Race Engineering	Mercedes-AMG GT3 Evo	4:13.9941	+5.4050
9	6	APA	(Australia) Tony D'Alberto (Australia) Grant Denyer	(Australia) Wall Racing	Lamborghini Huracán GT3 Evo	4:14.5492	+5.9608
10	9	APA	(Australia) Lee Holdsworth (Australia) Marc Cini	(Australia) Team Hallmarc	Audi R8 LMS Evo II	4:14.9955	+6.4064
11	19	APA	(Australia) Will Brown (Australia) Mark Griffith	(Australia) Nineteen Corp. Racing Team	Mercedes-AMG GT3 Evo	4.15.9068	+7.3177
12	**50**	**I**	**(Australia) Dale Wood (Australia) Trent Harrison**	**(Australia) M Motorsport**	**KTM X-Bow GT2 Concept**	**4:16.1244**	**+7.5353**
13	52	I	(Australia) Zane Morse (Papua New Guinea) Keith Kassulke	(Papua New Guinea) Wheels FX Racing PNG	MARC II V8	4:18.1303	+9.5412
14	**222**	**C**	**(Australia) Alex Davison (Australia) Geoff Emery**	**(Australia) Scott Taylor Motorsport**	**Porsche 991 GT3 II Cup**	**4:18.5187**	**+9.9296**
15	11	C	(Australia) Eric Constantinidis (Australia) Aaron Zerefos	(Australia) Our Kloud-UpTo11 Motorsport	Porsche 991 GT3 II Cup	4:35.1478	+26.5587
16	24	APA	(Australia) David Reynolds (Australia) Tony Bates	(Australia) Tony Bates Racing	Audi R8 LMS Evo II	5:33.7784	+1:25.1993
–	47	AAM	(Australia) David Russell (Australia) Paul Stokell	(Australia) Supabarn Motorsport	Audi R8 LMS Evo II		
–	95	I	(Australia) Declan Fraser (Australia) Jake Camilleri	MARC Cars Australia	MARC II V8		
–	17	APA	(Australia) Nick Percat (Australia) Mark Rosser	(Australia) Team BRM	Audi R8 LMS Evo II		
–	91	APA	(Germany) Maro Engel (Macau) Kevin Tse	(Hong Kong) Mercedes-AMG Team Craft-Bamboo Racing	Mercedes-AMG GT3 Evo		

=== Top Ten Shootout ===
Due to concerns over low tyre temperature, the traditional one-lap shootout was replaced by two fifteen minute sessions, the first for 6th to 10th positions in the qualifying session and the second from 1st to 5th positions.

Pos.	No.	Class	Driver	Team	Car	Time	Gap
1	**65**	**APA**	**(Australia) Chaz Mostert**	**(Australia) CoinSpot Racing Team**	**Audi R8 LMS Evo II**	**2:02.4930**	
2	74	APA	(South Africa) Kelvin van der Linde	(Australia) Audi Sport Team Valvoline	Audi R8 LMS Evo II	2:02.5788	+0.0858
3	75	APA	(France) Jules Gounon	(Australia) SunEnergy1 Triple Eight Race Engineering	Mercedes-AMG GT3 Evo	2:03.2192	+0.7262
4	777	APA	(Switzerland) Ricardo Feller	(Australia) The Bend Motorsport Park Team Valvoline	Audi R8 LMS Evo II	2:03.3380	+0.8450
5	888	APA	(New Zealand) Shane van Gisbergen	(Australia) MANN FILTER Triple Eight Race Engineering	Mercedes-AMG GT3 Evo	2:03.6381	+1.1451
6	9	APA	(Australia) Lee Holdsworth	(Australia) Team Hallmarc	Audi R8 LMS Evo II	2:04.0224	+1.5294
7	4	APA	(United Kingdom) Ben Barker	(Australia) Grove Racing	Porsche 911 GT3 R	2:04.1710	+1.6780
8	**55**	**AAM**	**(Australia) Duvashen Padayachee**	**(Australia) Valmont Racing**	**Mercedes-AMG GT3**	**2:04.6340**	**+2.1410**
9	6	APA	(Australia) Tony D'Alberto	(Australia) Wall Racing	Lamborghini Huracán GT3 Evo	2:04.6908	+2.1978
10	45	AAM	(Australia) Brett Hobson	(Australia) RAM Motorsport	Mercedes-AMG GT3 Evo	2:04.7550	+2.2620

== Race ==
Class winners are shown in bold.

Pos	Class	No.	Team	Drivers	Car	Laps	Time/Retired
Pos	Class	No.	Team	Drivers	Engine	Laps	Time/Retired
1	**APA**	**75**	**(Australia) SunEnergy1 Triple Eight Race Engineering**	**(Australia) Kenny Habul (France) Jules Gounon (Austria) Martin Konrad (Germany) Luca Stolz**	**Mercedes-AMG GT3 Evo**	**291**	**12:00:56.1980**
1	**APA**	**75**	**(Australia) SunEnergy1 Triple Eight Race Engineering**	**(Australia) Kenny Habul (France) Jules Gounon (Austria) Martin Konrad (Germany) Luca Stolz**	**Mercedes-AMG M159 6.2 L V8**	**291**	**12:00:56.1980**
2	APA	91	(Hong Kong) Mercedes-AMG Team Craft-Bamboo	(Spain) Daniel Juncadella (Germany) Maro Engel (Macau) Kevin Tse	Mercedes-AMG GT3 Evo	291	+8.7071
2	APA	91	(Hong Kong) Mercedes-AMG Team Craft-Bamboo	(Spain) Daniel Juncadella (Germany) Maro Engel (Macau) Kevin Tse	Mercedes-AMG M159 6.2 L V8	291	+8.7071
3	APA	888	(Australia) MANN FILTER Triple Eight Race Engineering	(New Zealand) Shane van Gisbergen (Australia) Broc Feeney (Malaysia) Prince Jefri Ibrahim	Mercedes-AMG GT3 Evo	291	+1:35.3671
3	APA	888	(Australia) MANN FILTER Triple Eight Race Engineering	(New Zealand) Shane van Gisbergen (Australia) Broc Feeney (Malaysia) Prince Jefri Ibrahim	Mercedes-AMG M159 6.2 L V8	291	+1:35.3671
4	APA	74	(Australia) Audi Sport Team Valvoline	(South Africa) Kelvin van der Linde (France) Nathanael Berthon (Australia) Brad Schumacher	Audi R8 LMS Evo II	290	+1 Lap
4	APA	74	(Australia) Audi Sport Team Valvoline	(South Africa) Kelvin van der Linde (France) Nathanael Berthon (Australia) Brad Schumacher	Audi DAR 5.2 L V10	290	+1 Lap
5	APA	6	(Australia) Wall Racing	(Australia) Tony D'Alberto (Australia) David Wall (Australia) Adrian Deitz (Australia) Grant Denyer	Lamborghini Huracán GT3 Evo	286	+5 Laps
5	APA	6	(Australia) Wall Racing	(Australia) Tony D'Alberto (Australia) David Wall (Australia) Adrian Deitz (Australia) Grant Denyer	Lamborghini DGF 5.2 L V10	286	+5 Laps
6	APA	9	(Australia) Hallmarc Racing	(Australia) Lee Holdsworth (Australia) Dean Fiore (Australia) Marc Cini	Audi R8 LMS Evo II	286	+5 Laps
6	APA	9	(Australia) Hallmarc Racing	(Australia) Lee Holdsworth (Australia) Dean Fiore (Australia) Marc Cini	Audi DAR 5.2 L V10	286	+5 Laps
7	APA	777	(Australia) Audi Sport Team Valvoline	(Germany) Markus Winkelhock (Switzerland) Ricardo Feller (Australia) Yasser Shahin	Audi R8 LMS Evo II	285	+6 Laps
7	APA	777	(Australia) Audi Sport Team Valvoline	(Germany) Markus Winkelhock (Switzerland) Ricardo Feller (Australia) Yasser Shahin	Audi DAR 5.2 L V10	285	+6 Laps
8	APA	17	(Australia) Team BRM	(Australia) Nick Percat (Australia) Joey Mawson (Australia) Mark Rosser	Audi R8 LMS Evo II	284	+7 Laps
8	APA	17	(Australia) Team BRM	(Australia) Nick Percat (Australia) Joey Mawson (Australia) Mark Rosser	Audi DAR 5.2 L V10	284	+7 Laps
9	**AAM**	**47**	**(Australia) Supabarn Racing**	**(Australia) David Russell (Australia) Paul Stokell (Australia) James Koundouris (Australia) Theo Koundouris**	**Audi R8 LMS Evo II**	**283**	**+8 Laps**
9	**AAM**	**47**	**(Australia) Supabarn Racing**	**(Australia) David Russell (Australia) Paul Stokell (Australia) James Koundouris (Australia) Theo Koundouris**	**Audi DAR 5.2 L V10**	**283**	**+8 Laps**
10	**C**	**222**	**(Australia) Prostate Cancer Foundation Racing / STM**	**(Australia) Scott Taylor (Australia) Alex Davison (Australia) Craig Lowndes (Australia) Geoff Emery**	**Porsche 991 GT3 II Cup**	**276**	**+15 Laps**
10	**C**	**222**	**(Australia) Prostate Cancer Foundation Racing / STM**	**(Australia) Scott Taylor (Australia) Alex Davison (Australia) Craig Lowndes (Australia) Geoff Emery**	**Porsche 4.0 L Flat-6**	**276**	**+15 Laps**
11	APA	24	(Australia) C Tech Laser by Tony Bates Racing	(Australia) Cam Waters (Australia) David Reynolds (Australia) Tony Bates	Audi R8 LMS Evo II	256	+35 Laps
11	APA	24	(Australia) C Tech Laser by Tony Bates Racing	(Australia) Cam Waters (Australia) David Reynolds (Australia) Tony Bates	Audi DAR 5.2 L V10	256	+35 Laps
NC	AAM	55	(Australia) Valmont Racing	(Australia) Duvashen Padayachee (Australia) Sergio Pires (Australia) Marcel Zalloua	Mercedes-AMG GT3	199	+92 laps
NC	AAM	55	(Australia) Valmont Racing	(Australia) Duvashen Padayachee (Australia) Sergio Pires (Australia) Marcel Zalloua	Mercedes-AMG M159 6.2 L V8	199	+92 laps
NC	C	11	(Australia) Our Kloud-UpTo11 Motorsport	(Australia) Aaron Zerefos (Australia) Eric Constantindis (South Africa) Indiran Padayachee	Porsche 991 GT3 II Cup	198	+93 laps
NC	C	11	(Australia) Our Kloud-UpTo11 Motorsport	(Australia) Aaron Zerefos (Australia) Eric Constantindis (South Africa) Indiran Padayachee	Porsche 4.0 L Flat-6	198	+93 laps
DNF	APA	4	(Australia) Grove Racing	(United Kingdom) Ben Barker (Australia) Brenton Grove (Australia) Stephen Grove	Porsche 911 GT3 R	197	Accident
DNF	APA	4	(Australia) Grove Racing	(United Kingdom) Ben Barker (Australia) Brenton Grove (Australia) Stephen Grove	Porsche 4.0 L Flat-6	197	Accident
DNF	AAM	45	(Australia) RAM Motorsport	(Australia) Garth Walden (Australia) Brett Hobson (Australia) Mike Sheargold	Mercedes-AMG GT3 Evo	170	Accident
DNF	AAM	45	(Australia) RAM Motorsport	(Australia) Garth Walden (Australia) Brett Hobson (Australia) Mike Sheargold	Mercedes-AMG M159 6.2 L V8	170	Accident
DNF	APA	65	(Australia) CoinSpot Racing Team	(Australia) Chaz Mostert (Australia) Liam Talbot (Australia) Fraser Ross	Audi R8 LMS Evo II	161	Accident
DNF	APA	65	(Australia) CoinSpot Racing Team	(Australia) Chaz Mostert (Australia) Liam Talbot (Australia) Fraser Ross	Audi DAR 5.2 L V10	161	Accident
DNF	I	95	MARC Cars Australia	(Australia) Geoff Taunton (Australia) Jake Camilleri (Australia) Declan Fraser	MARC II V8	143	Engine
DNF	I	95	MARC Cars Australia	(Australia) Geoff Taunton (Australia) Jake Camilleri (Australia) Declan Fraser	Ford Coyote 5.2 L V8	143	Engine
DNF	I	50	(Australia) M Motorsport	(Australia) Dale Wood (Australia) Glen Wood (Australia) Trent Harrison (Australia) David Crampton	KTM X-Bow GT2 Concept	38	Accident
DNF	I	50	(Australia) M Motorsport	(Australia) Dale Wood (Australia) Glen Wood (Australia) Trent Harrison (Australia) David Crampton	Audi TFSI 2.5 L Turbo I5	38	Accident
DNF	APA	19	(Australia) Nineteen Corp. Racing Team	(Australia) Will Brown (Australia) Jack Perkins (Australia) Mark Griffith	Mercedes-AMG GT3 Evo	33	Accident
DNF	APA	19	(Australia) Nineteen Corp. Racing Team	(Australia) Will Brown (Australia) Jack Perkins (Australia) Mark Griffith	Mercedes-AMG M159 6.2 L V8	33	Accident
DNF	I	52	(Papua New Guinea) Speed / FX Wheels Racing PNG	(Papua New Guinea) Keith Kassulke (Australia) Hadrian Morrall (Australia) Zane Morse	MARC II V8	15	Accident
DNF	I	52	(Papua New Guinea) Speed / FX Wheels Racing PNG	(Papua New Guinea) Keith Kassulke (Australia) Hadrian Morrall (Australia) Zane Morse	Ford Coyote 5.2 L V8	15	Accident
Fastest lap: (South Africa) Kelvin van der Linde – 2:03.1173 (lap 256)

Intercontinental GT Challenge
Previous race: 2021 Kyalami 9 Hours	2022 season	Next race: 2022 24 Hours of Spa
