= 2022 Intercontinental GT Challenge =

Motorsport season

The 2022 Intercontinental GT Challenge was the seventh season of the Intercontinental GT Challenge. It comprised four rounds starting with the Bathurst 12 Hour on 15 May with the finale at Gulf 12 Hours on 11 December.

== Calendar ==
Round	Race	Circuit	Date	Report
1	(Australia) Bathurst 12 Hour	Mount Panorama Circuit, Bathurst, Australia	13–15 May	Report
2	(Belgium) 24 Hours of Spa	Circuit de Spa-Francorchamps, Stavelot, Belgium	28–31 July	Report
3	Indianapolis 8 Hour	Indianapolis Motor Speedway, Indianapolis, United States	7–9 October	Report
4	(United Arab Emirates) Gulf 12 Hours	Yas Marina Circuit, Abu Dhabi, United Arab Emirates	9–11 December	Report

Also part of the GT World Challenge Australia
Also part of the GT World Challenge Europe
Also part of the GT World Challenge America

== Entry list ==
Manufacturer	Team	Car	No.	Drivers	Class	Rounds
Audi	(Australia) Team Hallmarc	R8 LMS Evo II	9	(Australia) Marc Cini	PA	1
Audi	(Australia) Team Hallmarc	R8 LMS Evo II	9	(Australia) Dean Fiore	PA	1
Audi	(Australia) Team Hallmarc	R8 LMS Evo II	9	(Australia) Lee Holdsworth	PA	1
Audi	(Australia) Team BRM	R8 LMS Evo II	17	(Australia) Joey Mawson	PA	1
Audi	(Australia) Team BRM	R8 LMS Evo II	17	(Australia) Nick Percat	PA	1
Audi	(Australia) Team BRM	R8 LMS Evo II	17	(Australia) Mark Rosser	PA	1
Audi	(Australia) C Tech Laser by Tony Bates Racing	R8 LMS Evo II	24	(Australia) Tony Bates	PA	1
Audi	(Australia) C Tech Laser by Tony Bates Racing	R8 LMS Evo II	24	(Australia) David Reynolds	PA	1
Audi	(Australia) C Tech Laser by Tony Bates Racing	R8 LMS Evo II	24	(Australia) Cameron Waters	PA	1
Audi	(France) Audi Sport Team Saintéloc	R8 LMS Evo II	25	(Switzerland) Patric Niederhauser	P	2, 4
Audi	(France) Audi Sport Team Saintéloc	R8 LMS Evo II	25	(Switzerland) Lucas Légeret	P	2
Audi	(France) Audi Sport Team Saintéloc	R8 LMS Evo II	25	(Germany) Christopher Mies	P	2
Audi	(France) Audi Sport Team Saintéloc	R8 LMS Evo II	25	(Germany) Christopher Haase	P	4
Audi	(France) Audi Sport Team Saintéloc	R8 LMS Evo II	25	(France) Erwan Bastard	P	4
Audi	(France) Saintéloc Junior Team	R8 LMS Evo II	26	(Switzerland) Lucas Légeret	S	4
Audi	(France) Saintéloc Junior Team	R8 LMS Evo II	26	(France) Simon Gachet	S	4
Audi	(France) Saintéloc Junior Team	R8 LMS Evo II	26	(Belgium) Gilles Magnus	S	4
Audi	(Belgium) Team WRT	R8 LMS Evo II	30	(Denmark) Benjamin Goethe	S	2
Audi	(Belgium) Team WRT	R8 LMS Evo II	30	(France) Thomas Neubauer	S	2
Audi	(Belgium) Team WRT	R8 LMS Evo II	30	(France) Jean-Baptiste Simmenauer	S	2
Audi	(Belgium) Audi Sport Team WRT	R8 LMS Evo II	32	(South Africa) Kelvin van der Linde	P	2
Audi	(Belgium) Audi Sport Team WRT	R8 LMS Evo II	32	(Belgium) Dries Vanthoor	P	2
Audi	(Belgium) Audi Sport Team WRT	R8 LMS Evo II	32	(Belgium) Charles Weerts	P	2
Audi	(Australia) Supabarn Motorsport	R8 LMS Evo II	47	(Australia) James Koundouris	Am	1
Audi	(Australia) Supabarn Motorsport	R8 LMS Evo II	47	(Australia) Theo Koundouris	Am	1
Audi	(Australia) Supabarn Motorsport	R8 LMS Evo II	47	(Australia) David Russell	Am	1
Audi	(Australia) Supabarn Motorsport	R8 LMS Evo II	47	(Australia) Paul Stokell	Am	1
Audi	(Australia) CoinSpot Racing Team	R8 LMS Evo II	65	(Australia) Chaz Mostert	PA	1
Audi	(Australia) CoinSpot Racing Team	R8 LMS Evo II	65	(Australia) Fraser Ross	PA	1
Audi	(Australia) CoinSpot Racing Team	R8 LMS Evo II	65	(Australia) Liam Talbot	PA	1
Audi	(Germany) Audi Sport Team Attempto	R8 LMS Evo II	66	(Switzerland) Ricardo Feller	P	2
Audi	(Germany) Audi Sport Team Attempto	R8 LMS Evo II	66	(Germany) Dennis Marschall	P	2
Audi	(Germany) Audi Sport Team Attempto	R8 LMS Evo II	66	(Germany) Markus Winkelhock	P	2
Audi	(Italy) Audi Sport Team Tresor	R8 LMS Evo II	66	(Italy) Mattia Drudi	P	4
Audi	(Italy) Audi Sport Team Tresor	R8 LMS Evo II	66	(Germany) Dennis Marschall	P	4
Audi	(Italy) Audi Sport Team Tresor	R8 LMS Evo II	66	(South Africa) Kelvin van der Linde	P	4
Audi	(Italy) Tresor Attempto Racing	R8 LMS Evo II	99	(Germany) Alex Aka	S	4
Audi	(Italy) Tresor Attempto Racing	R8 LMS Evo II	99	(United Kingdom) Finlay Hutchison	S	4
Audi	(Italy) Tresor Attempto Racing	R8 LMS Evo II	99	(Italy) Pietro Delli Guanti	S	4
Audi	(Australia) Audi Sport Team Valvoline	R8 LMS Evo II	74	(France) Nathanaël Berthon	PA	1
Audi	(Australia) Audi Sport Team Valvoline	R8 LMS Evo II	74	(South Africa) Kelvin van der Linde	PA	1
Audi	(Australia) Audi Sport Team Valvoline	R8 LMS Evo II	74	(Australia) Brad Schumacher	PA	1
Audi	(Australia) Audi Sport Team Valvoline	R8 LMS Evo II	777	(Switzerland) Ricardo Feller	PA	1
Audi	(Australia) Audi Sport Team Valvoline	R8 LMS Evo II	777	(Australia) Yasser Shahin	PA	1
Audi	(Australia) Audi Sport Team Valvoline	R8 LMS Evo II	777	(Germany) Markus Winkelhock	PA	1
Ferrari	(United States) Triarsi Competizione	488 GT3 Evo 2020	13	(United Kingdom) Ryan Dalziel	PA	3
Ferrari	(United States) Triarsi Competizione	488 GT3 Evo 2020	13	(United States) Conrad Grunewald	PA	3
Ferrari	(United States) Triarsi Competizione	488 GT3 Evo 2020	13	(United States) Justin Wetherill	PA	3
Ferrari	(Italy) AF Corse	488 GT3 Evo 2020	21	(Italy) Alessandro Balzan	G	2
Ferrari	(Italy) AF Corse	488 GT3 Evo 2020	21	(France) Hugo Delacour	G	2
Ferrari	(Italy) AF Corse	488 GT3 Evo 2020	21	(South Africa) David Perel	G	2
Ferrari	(Italy) AF Corse	488 GT3 Evo 2020	21	(Monaco) Cédric Sbirrazzuoli	G	2
Ferrari	(Italy) AF Corse	488 GT3 Evo 2020	52	(Italy) Giorgio Sernagiotto	Am	4
Ferrari	(Italy) AF Corse	488 GT3 Evo 2020	52	(Italy) Alessandro Cozzi	Am	4
Ferrari	(Italy) AF Corse	488 GT3 Evo 2020	52	(Lebanon) Tani Hanna	Am	4
Ferrari	(Italy) AF Corse	488 GT3 Evo 2020	52	(Italy) Gabriele Lancieri	Am	4
Ferrari	(United States) Conquest Racing	488 GT3 Evo 2020	34	(Italy) Alessandro Balzan	P	3
Ferrari	(United States) Conquest Racing	488 GT3 Evo 2020	34	(Italy) Daniel Mancinelli	P	3
Ferrari	(United States) Conquest Racing	488 GT3 Evo 2020	34	(Monaco) Cédric Sbirrazzuoli	P	3
Ferrari	(United States) AF Corse - MDK Motorsports	488 GT3 Evo 2020	43	(Denmark) Kevin Magnussen	P	4
Ferrari	(United States) AF Corse - MDK Motorsports	488 GT3 Evo 2020	43	(Denmark) Jan Magnussen	P	4
Ferrari	(United States) AF Corse - MDK Motorsports	488 GT3 Evo 2020	43	(United States) Mark Kvamme	P	4
Ferrari	(Italy) AF Corse - Francorchamps	488 GT3 Evo 2020	50	(Italy) Davide Rigon	P	4
Ferrari	(Italy) AF Corse - Francorchamps	488 GT3 Evo 2020	50	(Italy) Alessio Rovera	P	4
Ferrari	(Italy) AF Corse - Francorchamps	488 GT3 Evo 2020	50	(Denmark) Nicklas Nielsen	P	4
Ferrari	(Italy) AF Corse - Francorchamps	488 GT3 Evo 2020	51	(Spain) Miguel Molina	P	3
Ferrari	(Italy) AF Corse - Francorchamps	488 GT3 Evo 2020	51	(France) Pierre Ragues	P	3
Ferrari	(Italy) AF Corse - Francorchamps	488 GT3 Evo 2020	51	(Italy) Davide Rigon	P	3
Ferrari	(Italy) AF Corse - Francorchamps	488 GT3 Evo 2020	71	(Italy) Antonio Fuoco	P	3–4
Ferrari	(Italy) AF Corse - Francorchamps	488 GT3 Evo 2020	71	(Belgium) Ulysse de Pauw	P	3
Ferrari	(Italy) AF Corse - Francorchamps	488 GT3 Evo 2020	71	(Brazil) Daniel Serra	P	3
Ferrari	(Italy) AF Corse - Francorchamps	488 GT3 Evo 2020	71	(United Kingdom) James Calado	P	4
Ferrari	(Italy) AF Corse - Francorchamps	488 GT3 Evo 2020	71	(Italy) Alessandro Pier Guidi	P	4
Ferrari	(Italy) Iron Lynx	488 GT3 Evo 2020	51	(United Kingdom) James Calado	P	2
Ferrari	(Italy) Iron Lynx	488 GT3 Evo 2020	51	(Spain) Miguel Molina	P	2
Ferrari	(Italy) Iron Lynx	488 GT3 Evo 2020	51	(Denmark) Nicklas Nielsen	P	2
Ferrari	(Italy) Iron Lynx	488 GT3 Evo 2020	71	(Italy) Antonio Fuoco	P	2
Ferrari	(Italy) Iron Lynx	488 GT3 Evo 2020	71	(Italy) Davide Rigon	P	2
Ferrari	(Italy) Iron Lynx	488 GT3 Evo 2020	71	(Brazil) Daniel Serra	P	2
Ferrari	(Italy) Iron Dames	488 GT3 Evo 2020	83	(Belgium) Sarah Bovy	G	2
Ferrari	(Italy) Iron Dames	488 GT3 Evo 2020	83	(Switzerland) Rahel Frey	G	2
Ferrari	(Italy) Iron Dames	488 GT3 Evo 2020	83	(Denmark) Michelle Gatting	G	2
Ferrari	(Italy) Iron Dames	488 GT3 Evo 2020	83	(France) Doriane Pin	G	2
Lamborghini	(United States) K-PAX Racing	Huracán GT3 Evo	1	(Italy) Michele Beretta	P	3
Lamborghini	(United States) K-PAX Racing	Huracán GT3 Evo	1	(Italy) Andrea Caldarelli	P	3
Lamborghini	(United States) K-PAX Racing	Huracán GT3 Evo	1	(Italy) Marco Mapelli	P	3
Lamborghini	(United States) K-PAX Racing	Huracán GT3 Evo	3	(Canada) Misha Goikhberg	P	3
Lamborghini	(United States) K-PAX Racing	Huracán GT3 Evo	3	(South Africa) Jordan Pepper	P	3
Lamborghini	(United States) K-PAX Racing	Huracán GT3 Evo	3	(France) Franck Perera	P	3
Lamborghini	(Australia) Wall Racing	Huracán GT3 Evo	6	(Australia) Tony D'Alberto	PA	1
Lamborghini	(Australia) Wall Racing	Huracán GT3 Evo	6	(Australia) Adrian Deitz	PA	1
Lamborghini	(Australia) Wall Racing	Huracán GT3 Evo	6	(Australia) Grant Denyer	PA	1
Lamborghini	(Australia) Wall Racing	Huracán GT3 Evo	6	(Australia) David Wall	PA	1
Lamborghini	(United States) Orange 1 K-PAX Racing	Huracán GT3 Evo	6	(Italy) Andrea Caldarelli	P	2
Lamborghini	(United States) Orange 1 K-PAX Racing	Huracán GT3 Evo	6	(Italy) Marco Mapelli	P	2
Lamborghini	(United States) Orange 1 K-PAX Racing	Huracán GT3 Evo	6	(South Africa) Jordan Pepper	P	2
Lamborghini	(Switzerland) Emil Frey Racing	Huracán GT3 Evo	19	(Italy) Giacomo Altoè	P	2
Lamborghini	(Switzerland) Emil Frey Racing	Huracán GT3 Evo	19	(France) Arthur Rougier	P	2
Lamborghini	(Switzerland) Emil Frey Racing	Huracán GT3 Evo	19	(France) Léo Roussel	P	2
Lamborghini	(Switzerland) Emil Frey Racing	Huracán GT3 Evo	63	(United Kingdom) Jack Aitken	P	2
Lamborghini	(Switzerland) Emil Frey Racing	Huracán GT3 Evo	63	(Italy) Mirko Bortolotti	P	2
Lamborghini	(Switzerland) Emil Frey Racing	Huracán GT3 Evo	63	(Spain) Albert Costa	P	2
Lamborghini	(United States) Zelus Motorsports	Huracán GT3 Evo	88	(United States) Jason Harward	Am	3
Lamborghini	(United States) Zelus Motorsports	Huracán GT3 Evo	88	(United States) Seth Lucas	Am	3
Lamborghini	(United States) Zelus Motorsports	Huracán GT3 Evo	88	(United States) Jason Daskalos	Am	3
Lamborghini	(United States) TR3 Racing	Huracán GT3 Evo	91	(United States) Jon Branam	PA	3
Lamborghini	(United States) TR3 Racing	Huracán GT3 Evo	91	(United States) Jeff Burton	PA	3
Lamborghini	(United States) TR3 Racing	Huracán GT3 Evo	91	(United States) Corey Lewis	PA	3
Lamborghini	(Italy) Vincenzo Sospiri Racing	Huracán GT3 Evo	563	(Poland) Karol Basz	S	2
Lamborghini	(Italy) Vincenzo Sospiri Racing	Huracán GT3 Evo	563	(Italy) Michele Beretta	S	2
Lamborghini	(Italy) Vincenzo Sospiri Racing	Huracán GT3 Evo	563	(Chile) Benjamín Hites	S	2
Lamborghini	(Italy) Vincenzo Sospiri Racing	Huracán GT3 Evo	563	(Japan) Yuki Nemoto	S	2
Mercedes-AMG	(Germany) Mercedes-AMG Team GetSpeed	AMG GT3 Evo	2	(Germany) Maximilian Götz	P	2
Mercedes-AMG	(Germany) Mercedes-AMG Team GetSpeed	AMG GT3 Evo	2	(Netherlands) Steijn Schothorst	P	2
Mercedes-AMG	(Germany) Mercedes-AMG Team GetSpeed	AMG GT3 Evo	2	(Germany) Luca Stolz	P	2
Mercedes-AMG	(United States) US RaceTronics	AMG GT3 Evo	6	(United States) Steven Aghakhani	P	3
Mercedes-AMG	(United States) US RaceTronics	AMG GT3 Evo	6	(Italy) Loris Spinelli	P	3
Mercedes-AMG	(United States) US RaceTronics	AMG GT3 Evo	6	(France) Tristan Vautier	P	3
Mercedes-AMG	(Australia) Nineteen Corporation Racing Team	AMG GT3 Evo	19	(Australia) Will Brown	PA	1
Mercedes-AMG	(Australia) Nineteen Corporation Racing Team	AMG GT3 Evo	19	(Australia) Mark Griffith	PA	1
Mercedes-AMG	(Australia) Nineteen Corporation Racing Team	AMG GT3 Evo	19	(Australia) Jack Perkins	PA	1
Mercedes-AMG	(United States) Winward Racing	AMG GT3 Evo	33	(Switzerland) Philip Ellis	P	3
Mercedes-AMG	(United States) Winward Racing	AMG GT3 Evo	33	(France) Jules Gounon	P	3
Mercedes-AMG	(United States) Winward Racing	AMG GT3 Evo	33	(United States) Russell Ward	P	3
Mercedes-AMG	(Australia) RAM Motorsport	AMG GT3 Evo	45	(Australia) Brett Hobson	Am	1
Mercedes-AMG	(Australia) RAM Motorsport	AMG GT3 Evo	45	(Australia) Michael Sheargold	Am	1
Mercedes-AMG	(Australia) RAM Motorsport	AMG GT3 Evo	45	(Australia) Garth Walden	Am	1
Mercedes-AMG	(Hong Kong) Mercedes-AMG GruppeM Racing	AMG GT3 Evo	55	(Germany) Maximilian Buhk	P	2
Mercedes-AMG	(Hong Kong) Mercedes-AMG GruppeM Racing	AMG GT3 Evo	55	(Germany) Maro Engel	P	2
Mercedes-AMG	(Hong Kong) Mercedes-AMG GruppeM Racing	AMG GT3 Evo	55	(Canada) Mikaël Grenier	P	2
Mercedes-AMG	(Hong Kong) Mercedes-AMG GruppeM Racing	AMG GT3 Evo	89	(Switzerland) Raffaele Marciello	P	4
Mercedes-AMG	(Hong Kong) Mercedes-AMG GruppeM Racing	AMG GT3 Evo	89	(France) Jules Gounon	P	4
Mercedes-AMG	(Hong Kong) Mercedes-AMG GruppeM Racing	AMG GT3 Evo	89	(Spain) Daniel Juncadella	P	4
Mercedes-AMG	(Hong Kong) Mercedes-AMG GruppeM Racing	AMG GT3 Evo	98	(Germany) Maro Engel	P	4
Mercedes-AMG	(Hong Kong) Mercedes-AMG GruppeM Racing	AMG GT3 Evo	98	(Germany) Maximilian Götz	P	4
Mercedes-AMG	(Hong Kong) Mercedes-AMG GruppeM Racing	AMG GT3 Evo	98	(Austria) Lucas Auer	P	4
Mercedes-AMG	(Australia) SunEnergy1 Racing by Triple Eight	AMG GT3 Evo	75	(France) Jules Gounon	PA	1
Mercedes-AMG	(Australia) SunEnergy1 Racing by Triple Eight	AMG GT3 Evo	75	(Australia) Kenny Habul	PA	1
Mercedes-AMG	(Australia) SunEnergy1 Racing by Triple Eight	AMG GT3 Evo	75	(Austria) Martin Konrad	PA	1
Mercedes-AMG	(Australia) SunEnergy1 Racing by Triple Eight	AMG GT3 Evo	75	(Germany) Luca Stolz	PA	1
Mercedes-AMG	(Australia) SunEnergy1 Racing by SPS	AMG GT3 Evo	75	(Switzerland) Philip Ellis	PA	2, 4
Mercedes-AMG	(Australia) SunEnergy1 Racing by SPS	AMG GT3 Evo	75	(Australia) Kenny Habul	PA	2, 4
Mercedes-AMG	(Australia) SunEnergy1 Racing by SPS	AMG GT3 Evo	75	(Austria) Martin Konrad	PA	2, 4
Mercedes-AMG	(Australia) SunEnergy1 Racing by SPS	AMG GT3 Evo	75	(Austria) Dominik Baumann	PA	2
Mercedes-AMG	(Australia) SunEnergy1 Racing by AKKodis ASP	AMG GT3 Evo	75	(Austria) Dominik Baumann	PA	3
Mercedes-AMG	(Australia) SunEnergy1 Racing by AKKodis ASP	AMG GT3 Evo	75	(Australia) Kenny Habul	PA	3
Mercedes-AMG	(Australia) SunEnergy1 Racing by AKKodis ASP	AMG GT3 Evo	75	(Austria) Martin Konrad	PA	3
Mercedes-AMG	(Hong Kong) Mercedes-AMG Team Craft-Bamboo Racing	AMG GT3 Evo	77	(Spain) Daniel Juncadella	P	3
Mercedes-AMG	(Hong Kong) Mercedes-AMG Team Craft-Bamboo Racing	AMG GT3 Evo	77	(Switzerland) Raffaele Marciello	P	3
Mercedes-AMG	(Hong Kong) Mercedes-AMG Team Craft-Bamboo Racing	AMG GT3 Evo	77	(Canada) Daniel Morad	P	3
Mercedes-AMG	(Hong Kong) Mercedes-AMG Team Craft-Bamboo Racing	AMG GT3 Evo	91	(Germany) Maro Engel	PA	1
Mercedes-AMG	(Hong Kong) Mercedes-AMG Team Craft-Bamboo Racing	AMG GT3 Evo	91	(Spain) Daniel Juncadella	PA	1
Mercedes-AMG	(Hong Kong) Mercedes-AMG Team Craft-Bamboo Racing	AMG GT3 Evo	91	(Macau) Kevin Tse	PA	1
Mercedes-AMG	(Oman) Al Manar Racing by GetSpeed	AMG GT3 Evo	77	(Germany) Luca Stolz	P	4
Mercedes-AMG	(Oman) Al Manar Racing by GetSpeed	AMG GT3 Evo	77	(Oman) Al Faisal Al Zubair	P	4
Mercedes-AMG	(Oman) Al Manar Racing by GetSpeed	AMG GT3 Evo	77	(Germany) Fabian Schiller	P	4
Mercedes-AMG	(France) Mercedes-AMG Team AKKodis ASP	AMG GT3 Evo	88	(France) Jules Gounon	P	2
Mercedes-AMG	(France) Mercedes-AMG Team AKKodis ASP	AMG GT3 Evo	88	(Spain) Daniel Juncadella	P	2
Mercedes-AMG	(France) Mercedes-AMG Team AKKodis ASP	AMG GT3 Evo	88	(Switzerland) Raffaele Marciello	P	2
Mercedes-AMG	(Oman) Al Manar Racing by HRT	AMG GT3 Evo	777	(Oman) Al Faisal Al Zubair	S	2
Mercedes-AMG	(Oman) Al Manar Racing by HRT	AMG GT3 Evo	777	(Zimbabwe) Axcil Jefferies	S	2
Mercedes-AMG	(Oman) Al Manar Racing by HRT	AMG GT3 Evo	777	(Canada) Daniel Morad	S	2
Mercedes-AMG	(Oman) Al Manar Racing by HRT	AMG GT3 Evo	777	(Germany) Fabian Schiller	S	2
Mercedes-AMG	(Australia) Triple Eight Race Engineering	AMG GT3 Evo	888	(Australia) Broc Feeney	PA	1
Mercedes-AMG	(Australia) Triple Eight Race Engineering	AMG GT3 Evo	888	(New Zealand) Shane van Gisbergen	PA	1
Mercedes-AMG	(Australia) Triple Eight Race Engineering	AMG GT3 Evo	888	(Malaysia) Prince Jefri Ibrahim	PA	1
Mercedes-AMG	(Australia) Valmont Racing	AMG GT3	55	(Australia) Duvashen Padayachee	Am	1
Mercedes-AMG	(Australia) Valmont Racing	AMG GT3	55	(Australia) Sergio Pires	Am	1
Mercedes-AMG	(Australia) Valmont Racing	AMG GT3	55	(Australia) Marcel Zalloua	Am	1
Porsche	(Australia) Grove Racing	911 GT3 R	4	(United Kingdom) Ben Barker	PA	1
Porsche	(Australia) Grove Racing	911 GT3 R	4	(Australia) Brenton Grove	PA	1
Porsche	(Australia) Grove Racing	911 GT3 R	4	(Australia) Stephen Grove	PA	1
Porsche	(Malaysia) EBM Giga Racing	911 GT3 R	16	(Australia) Brenton Grove	Am	4
Porsche	(Malaysia) EBM Giga Racing	911 GT3 R	16	(Malaysia) Adrian D'Silva	Am	4
Porsche	(Malaysia) EBM Giga Racing	911 GT3 R	16	(Australia) Stephen Grove	Am	4
Porsche	(Malaysia) EBM Giga Racing	911 GT3 R	16	(Luxembourg) Carlos Rivas	Am	4
Porsche	(United States) GMG Racing	911 GT3 R	32	(Austria) Klaus Bachler	PA	3
Porsche	(United States) GMG Racing	911 GT3 R	32	(United States) James Sofronas	PA	3
Porsche	(United States) GMG Racing	911 GT3 R	32	(United States) Kyle Washington	PA	3
Porsche	(Thailand) Singha Racing Team TP 12	911 GT3 R	39	(New Zealand) Earl Bamber	PA	2
Porsche	(Thailand) Singha Racing Team TP 12	911 GT3 R	39	(Thailand) Piti Bhirombhakdi	PA	2
Porsche	(Thailand) Singha Racing Team TP 12	911 GT3 R	39	(France) Christophe Hamon	PA	2
Porsche	(Thailand) Singha Racing Team TP 12	911 GT3 R	39	(Thailand) Tanart Sathienthirakul	PA	2
Porsche	(Germany) Herberth Motorsport	911 GT3 R	44	(Austria) Klaus Bachler	PA	4
Porsche	(Germany) Herberth Motorsport	911 GT3 R	44	(Germany) Alfred Renauer	PA	4
Porsche	(Germany) Herberth Motorsport	911 GT3 R	44	(Switzerland) Daniel Allemann	PA	4
Porsche	(Germany) Herberth Motorsport	911 GT3 R	69	(Germany) Robert Renauer	PA	4
Porsche	(Germany) Herberth Motorsport	911 GT3 R	69	(Germany) Patrick Kolb	PA	4
Porsche	(Germany) Herberth Motorsport	911 GT3 R	69	(Germany) Ralf Bohn	PA	4
Porsche	(United States) Wright Motorsports	911 GT3 R	45	(Germany) Elia Erhart	PA	3
Porsche	(United States) Wright Motorsports	911 GT3 R	45	(Belgium) Jan Heylen	PA	3
Porsche	(United States) Wright Motorsports	911 GT3 R	45	(United States) Charlie Luck	PA	3
Porsche	(United Arab Emirates) S’Aalocin Racing	911 GT3 R	48	(Netherlands) Stéphane Kox	PA	4
Porsche	(United Arab Emirates) S’Aalocin Racing	911 GT3 R	48	(Netherlands) Peter Kox	PA	4
Porsche	(United Arab Emirates) S’Aalocin Racing	911 GT3 R	48	(Netherlands) Nico Pronk	PA	4
Porsche	(United Arab Emirates) S’Aalocin Racing	911 GT3 R	48	(Belgium) Tom Boonen	PA	4
Porsche	(Hong Kong) KCMG	911 GT3 R	47	(Norway) Dennis Olsen	P	2
Porsche	(Hong Kong) KCMG	911 GT3 R	47	(United Kingdom) Nick Tandy	P	2
Porsche	(Hong Kong) KCMG	911 GT3 R	47	(Belgium) Laurens Vanthoor	P	2
Porsche	(Germany) Toksport WRT	911 GT3 R	100	(France) Julien Andlauer	P	2
Porsche	(Germany) Toksport WRT	911 GT3 R	100	(Germany) Marvin Dienst	P	2
Porsche	(Germany) Toksport WRT	911 GT3 R	100	(Germany) Sven Müller	P	2
Porsche	(United Arab Emirates) GPX Martini Racing	911 GT3 R	221	(Denmark) Michael Christensen	P	2
Porsche	(United Arab Emirates) GPX Martini Racing	911 GT3 R	221	(France) Kévin Estre	P	2
Porsche	(United Arab Emirates) GPX Martini Racing	911 GT3 R	221	(Austria) Richard Lietz	P	2

Icon	Class
P	Pro Cup
S	Silver Cup
PA	Pro-Am Cup
G	Gold Cup
Am	Am Cup

Intercontinental GT Pro-Am Challenge
Manufacturer	Team	Car	No.	Drivers	Class	Rounds
Mercedes-AMG	(Australia) SunEnergy1 Racing by Triple Eight	AMG GT3 Evo	75	(France) Jules Gounon	PA	1
Mercedes-AMG	(Australia) SunEnergy1 Racing by Triple Eight	AMG GT3 Evo	75	(Australia) Kenny Habul	PA	1
Mercedes-AMG	(Australia) SunEnergy1 Racing by Triple Eight	AMG GT3 Evo	75	(Austria) Martin Konrad	PA	1
Mercedes-AMG	(Australia) SunEnergy1 Racing by Triple Eight	AMG GT3 Evo	75	(Germany) Luca Stolz	PA	1
Mercedes-AMG	(Australia) SunEnergy1 Racing by SPS	AMG GT3 Evo	75	(Switzerland) Philip Ellis	PA	2, 4
Mercedes-AMG	(Australia) SunEnergy1 Racing by SPS	AMG GT3 Evo	75	(Australia) Kenny Habul	PA	2, 4
Mercedes-AMG	(Australia) SunEnergy1 Racing by SPS	AMG GT3 Evo	75	(Austria) Martin Konrad	PA	2, 4
Mercedes-AMG	(Australia) SunEnergy1 Racing by SPS	AMG GT3 Evo	75	(Austria) Dominik Baumann	PA	2
Mercedes-AMG	(Australia) SunEnergy1 Racing by AKKodis ASP	AMG GT3 Evo	75	(Austria) Dominik Baumann	PA	3
Mercedes-AMG	(Australia) SunEnergy1 Racing by AKKodis ASP	AMG GT3 Evo	75	(Australia) Kenny Habul	PA	3
Mercedes-AMG	(Australia) SunEnergy1 Racing by AKKodis ASP	AMG GT3 Evo	75	(Austria) Martin Konrad	PA	3
Mercedes-AMG	(United Kingdom) Sky - Tempesta Racing by HRT	AMG GT3 Evo	93	(Italy) Eddie Cheever III	PA	2
Mercedes-AMG	(United Kingdom) Sky - Tempesta Racing by HRT	AMG GT3 Evo	93	(United Kingdom) Chris Froggatt	PA	2
Mercedes-AMG	(United Kingdom) Sky - Tempesta Racing by HRT	AMG GT3 Evo	93	(Hong Kong) Jonathan Hui	PA	2
Mercedes-AMG	(United Kingdom) Sky - Tempesta Racing by HRT	AMG GT3 Evo	93	(Italy) Loris Spinelli	PA	2
McLaren	(United Kingdom) Inception Racing	720S GT3	7	(United States) Brendan Iribe	G	2
McLaren	(United Kingdom) Inception Racing	720S GT3	7	(United Kingdom) Ollie Millroy	G	2
McLaren	(United Kingdom) Inception Racing	720S GT3	7	(Denmark) Frederik Schandorff	G	2
McLaren	(United Kingdom) Inception Racing	720S GT3	7	(Guernsey) Sebastian Priaulx	G	2

== Race results ==
Rd	Circuit	Pole position	IGTC Winners	Winning Manufacturer	Ref.
1	(Australia) Bathurst	(Australia) No. 65 CoinSpot Racing Team	(Australia) No. 75 SunEnergy1 Racing	(Germany) Mercedes-AMG	
1	(Australia) Bathurst	(Australia) Chaz Mostert (Australia) Fraser Ross (Australia) Liam Talbot	(France) Jules Gounon (Australia) Kenny Habul (Austria) Martin Konrad (Germany) Luca Stolz	(Germany) Mercedes-AMG	
2	(Belgium) Spa-Francorchamps	(France) No. 88 Mercedes-AMG Team AKKodis ASP	(France) No. 88 Mercedes-AMG Team AKKodis ASP	(Germany) Mercedes-AMG	
2	(Belgium) Spa-Francorchamps	(France) Jules Gounon (Spain) Daniel Juncadella (Switzerland) Raffaele Marciello	(France) Jules Gounon (Spain) Daniel Juncadella (Switzerland) Raffaele Marciello	(Germany) Mercedes-AMG	
3	(United States) Indianapolis	(United States) No. 33 Winward Racing	(Hong Kong) No. 77 Mercedes-AMG Team Craft-Bamboo Racing	(Germany) Mercedes-AMG	
3	(United States) Indianapolis	(Switzerland) Philip Ellis (France) Jules Gounon (United States) Russell Ward	(Spain) Daniel Juncadella (Switzerland) Raffaele Marciello (Canada) Daniel Morad	(Germany) Mercedes-AMG	
4	(United Arab Emirates) Abu Dhabi	(Hong Kong) No. 98 Mercedes-AMG GruppeM Racing	(Italy) No. 71 AF Corse - Francorchamps	(Italy) Ferrari	
4	(United Arab Emirates) Abu Dhabi	(Austria) Lucas Auer (Germany) Maro Engel (Germany) Maximilian Götz	(United Kingdom) James Calado (Italy) Antonio Fuoco (Italy) Alessandro Pier Guidi	(Italy) Ferrari	

== Championship standings ==
Scoring system

Championship points were awarded for the first ten positions in each race. Entries were required to complete 75% of the winning car's race distance in order to be classified and earn points, with the exception of Bathurst where a car simply had to cross the finish line to be classified. Individual drivers were required to participate for a minimum of 25 minutes in order to earn championship points in any race. A manufacturer only received points for its two highest placed cars in each round.

Position	**1st**	**2nd**	**3rd**	**4th**	**5th**	**6th**	**7th**	**8th**	**9th**	**10th**
Points	25	18	15	12	10	8	6	4	2	1

=== Drivers' championships ===
The results indicate the classification relative to other drivers in the series, not the classification in the race.

Pos.	Driver	Manufacturer	BAT (Australia)	SPA (Belgium)	IND (United States)	GUL (United Arab Emirates)	Points
1	(Spain) Daniel Juncadella	Mercedes-AMG	2	**1**	1	Ret	68
2	(France) Jules Gounon	Mercedes-AMG	1	**1**	**3**	Ret	65
3	(Italy) Antonio Fuoco	Ferrari		3	2	1	58
4	(Germany) Luca Stolz	Mercedes-AMG	1	2		4	55
5	(Switzerland) Raffaele Marciello	Mercedes-AMG		**1**	1	Ret	50
6	(Italy) Davide Rigon	Ferrari		3	4	2	45
7	(Australia) Kenny Habul (Austria) Martin Konrad	Mercedes-AMG	1	28		5	35
8	(Brazil) Daniel Serra	Ferrari		3	2		33
8	(United Kingdom) James Calado	Ferrari		6		1	33
9	(Germany) Maro Engel	Mercedes-AMG	2	4		**Ret**	30
10	(Denmark) Nicklas Nielsen	Ferrari		6		2	26
11	(Canada) Daniel Morad	Mercedes-AMG		Ret	1		25
11	(Switzerland) Philip Ellis	Mercedes-AMG			**3**	5	25
11	(Italy) Alessandro Pier Guidi	Ferrari				1	25
12	(Spain) Miguel Molina	Ferrari		6	4		20
13	(Netherlands) Steijn Schothorst	Mercedes-AMG		2			18
13	(Germany) Maximilian Götz	Mercedes-AMG		2		**Ret**	18
13	(Macau) Kevin Tse	Mercedes-AMG	2				18
13	(Belgium) Ulysse de Pauw	Ferrari			2		18
13	(Italy) Alessio Rovera	Ferrari				2	18
14	(South Africa) Jordan Pepper	Lamborghini		7	5		16
15	(Malaysia) Prince Jefri Ibrahim (Australia) Broc Feeney (New Zealand) Shane van Gisbergen	Mercedes-AMG	3				15
15	(United States) Russell Ward	Mercedes-AMG			**3**		15
15	(Germany) Christopher Haase (France) Erwan Bastard	Mercedes-AMG				3	15
15	(Switzerland) Patric Niederhauser	Mercedes-AMG				3	15
16	(Germany) Maximilian Buhk (Canada) Mikaël Grenier	Mercedes-AMG		4			12
16	(South Africa) Kelvin van der Linde	Audi	4				12
16	(Australia) Brad Schumacher (France) Nathanaël Berthon	Audi	4				12
16	(France) Pierre Ragues	Ferrari			4		12
16	(Oman) Al Faisal Al Zubair (Germany) Fabian Schiller	Mercedes-AMG		Ret		4	12
17	(Norway) Dennis Olsen (United Kingdom) Nick Tandy (Belgium) Laurens Vanthoor	Porsche		5			10
17	(Germany) Markus Winkelhock (Switzerland) Ricardo Feller	Audi	7	8			10
17	(Australia) Tony D'Alberto (Australia) Adrian Deitz (Australia) Grant Denyer (Australia) David Wall	Lamborghini	5				10
17	(Canada) Misha Goikhberg (France) Franck Perera	Lamborghini			5		10
18	(Australia) Marc Cini (Australia) Dean Fiore (Australia) Lee Holdsworth	Audi	6				8
18	(United States) Jon Branam (United States) Jeff Burton (United States) Corey Lewis	Lamborghini			6		8
18	(Denmark) Kevin Magnussen (Denmark) Jan Magnussen (United States) Mark Kvamme	Ferrari				6	8
19	(Italy) Marco Mapelli (Italy) Andrea Caldarelli	Lamborghini		7			6
19	(Australia) Yasser Shahin	Audi	7				6
19	(United States) James Sofronas (United States) Kyle Washington	Porsche			7		6
19	(Austria) Klaus Bachler	Porsche			7		6
19	(Germany) Alex Aka (United Kingdom) Finlay Hutchison (Italy) Pietro Delli Guanti	Audi				7	6
20	(Germany) Dennis Marschall	Audi		8			4
20	(Australia) Joey Mawson (Australia) Nick Percat (Australia) Mark Rosser	Audi	8				4
20	(Germany) Elia Erhart (Belgium) Jan Heylen (United States) Charlie Luck	Porsche			8		4
20	(Germany) Robert Renauer (Germany) Patrick Kolb (Germany) Ralf Bohn	Porsche				8	4
21	(Denmark) Benjamin Goethe (France) Thomas Neubauer (France) Jean-Baptiste Simmenauer	Audi		9			2
21	(Italy) Giorgio Sernagiotto (Italy) Alessandro Cozzi (Lebanon) Tani Hanna (Italy) Gabriele Lancieri	Ferrari				9	2
22	(France) Léo Roussel (France) Arthur Rougier (Italy) Giacomo Altoè	Lamborghini		10			1
22	(Netherlands) Stéphane Kox (Netherlands) Peter Kox (Netherlands) Nico Pronk	Porsche				10	1
Pos.	Driver	Manufacturer	BAT (Australia)	SPA (Belgium)	IND (United States)	GUL (United Arab Emirates)	Points

Colour	Result
Gold	Winner
Silver	Second place
Bronze	Third place
Green	Points classification
Blue	Non-points classification
Blue	Non-classified finish (NC)
Purple	Retired, not classified (Ret)
Red	Did not qualify (DNQ)
Red	Did not pre-qualify (DNPQ)
Black	Disqualified (DSQ)
White	Did not start (DNS)
White	Withdrew (WD)
White	Race cancelled (C)
Blank	Did not practice (DNP)
Blank	Did not arrive (DNA)
Blank	Excluded (EX)

**Bold** – Pole
Italics – Fastest Lap

=== Manufacturer's championship ===
Pos.	Manufacturer	BAT (Australia)	SPA (Belgium)	IND (United States)	GUL (United Arab Emirates)	Points
1	(Germany) Mercedes-AMG	1	**1**	1	4	148
1	(Germany) Mercedes-AMG	2	2	**3**	5	148
2	(Italy) Ferrari		3	2	1	98
2	(Italy) Ferrari		6	4	2	98
3	(Germany) Audi	4	8		3	58
3	(Germany) Audi	6	9		7	58
4	(Italy) Lamborghini	5	7	5		40
4	(Italy) Lamborghini		10	6		40
5	(Germany) Porsche		5	7	8	33
5	(Germany) Porsche			8	10	33

== See also ==
- 2022 British GT Championship
- 2022 GT World Challenge Europe
- 2022 GT World Challenge Europe Sprint Cup
- 2022 GT World Challenge Europe Endurance Cup
- 2022 GT World Challenge Asia
- 2022 GT World Challenge America
- 2022 GT World Challenge Australia
