= 2008 Bathurst 12 Hour =

Endurance motor racing event

2008 WPS Bathurst 12 Hour

Seasons
- ← 2007 2009 →

Layout of the Mount Panorama Circuit

The 2008 WPS Bathurst 12 Hour was an endurance race for Group 3J Performance Cars and Group 3E Series Production Cars. The race was staged at the Mount Panorama Circuit, Bathurst, New South Wales, Australia on 10 February 2008. It was the sixth Bathurst 12 Hour to be held and the second since its 2007 revival. The race was won by Rod Salmon, Damien White and Graham Alexander driving a Mitsubishi Lancer Evolution. It was the first time a Mitsubishi had won the race.

== Class structure ==
Cars competed in the following classes:

- Class A - High Performance All Wheel Drive
- Class B - High Performance Rear Wheel Drive
- Class C - Hot Hatch Performance Cars
- Class D - Production Vehicles under $50,000
- Class E - Production Sports under $50,000
- Class F - Under 2.5 Litre Production
- Class G - Eco Diesel Over 3.5 Litre (No starters)
- Class H - Eco Diesel 3.5 Litres and Under

== Results ==
| Position | Drivers | No. | Car | Entrant | Class pos. | Class | Laps |
|---|---|---|---|---|---|---|---|
| 1 | (Australia) Rod Salmon (Australia) Damien White (Australia) Graham Alexander | 87 | Mitsubishi Lancer Evo IX | SKWIRK.com | 1 | A | 253 |
| 2 | (United Kingdom) Tony Quinn (Australia) Klark Quinn (Australia) Grant Denyer | 29 | Mitsubishi Lancer Evo IX | VIP Petfoods (Aust) PL | 2 | A | 253 |
| 3 | (Australia) Garry Holt (Australia) Paul Morris (New Zealand) Craig Baird | 20 | BMW 335i | Eastern Creek Karts P/L | 1 | B | 252 |
| 4 | (Australia) Barrie Morcom (Australia) Steve Owen (Australia) Layton Cranbrook | 11 | BMW 335i | Rondo / CIS Group | 2 | B | 247 |
| 5 | (Australia) Martin Notaras (Australia) Des Wall (Australia) David Wall (Australia) Trevor Symonds | 43 | Mitsubishi Lancer Evo IX | Alan East Motorsport | 3 | A | 243 |
| 6 | (Australia) Luke Searle (Australia) Peter Kelly | 3 | BMW 130i | XEETEC | 1 | C | 243 |
| 7 | (Australia) Mark O'Connor (Australia) Andrew Fisher (Australia) Richard Buttrose | 10 | Lotus Exige | Lotus Cars Australia | 3 | B | 241 |
| 8 | (Australia) David Schulz (New Zealand) Andy Knight (United Kingdom) James Winslow | 26 | Subaru Impreza WRX STi | Wilson Brothers Racing | 4 | A | 239 |
| 9 | (Australia) Brian Walden (Australia) Garth Walden (Australia) Michael Auld | 24 | Holden VY Commodore SS | Walden Motorsport | 1 | D | 236 |
| 10 | (Australia) Kurt Kratzmann (New Zealand) Ian Tulloch (New Zealand) Brent Collins | 25 | Subaru Impreza WRX STi | WBR / Gizmo / Laminex | 5 | A | 235 |
| 11 | (Australia) Colin Osborne (Australia) Neal Bates (Australia) John Roecken | 13 | Toyota Celica | Osborne Motorsport | 1 | E | 234 |
| 12 | (Australia) Allan Letcher (Australia) Nathan Callaghan (Australia) Clint Harvey | 72 | Toyota Celica | True Blue Motorsport | 2 | E | 233 |
| 13 | (Australia) Peter Conroy (Australia) Terry Conroy (Australia) Carl Schembri | 14 | Honda Integra Type S | Hankook Tyres / Disc Brakes Au | 3 | E | 231 |
| 14 | (Australia) Barrie Nesbitt (Australia) Tony Alford (Australia) Paul Freestone | 5 | HSV GTS | Donut King | 4 | B | 230 |
| 15 | (Australia) Richard Howe (Australia) Dennis O'Keefe (Australia) Dean Neville | 94 | Ford BF Falcon XR6 Turbo | Aporschapart | 2 | D | 228 |
| 16 | (Australia) Bill Sherwood (Australia) Hadrian Morrall (Australia) Stuart Jones | 31 | Toyota Celica | Osborne Motorsport | 4 | E | 225 |
| 17 | (Australia) Rob Thomson (Australia) Greg Willis (Australia) Guy Gibbons | 68 | Lotus Exige | Queensland House and Land.com | 5 | B | 221 |
| 18 | (Australia) Ross Buckingham (Australia) Jamie Augustine (Australia) Brett Youlden (Australia) Greg Sticker | 40 | Hyundai Sonata | Kangan Batman TAFE/Hankook Tyres | 1 | F | 219 |
| 19 | (Australia) Jim Hunter (Australia) Warren Bossie (Australia) Matthew Windsor | 88 | Subaru Impreza RS | Jim Hunters Suspension | 2 | F | 219 |
| 20 | (Australia) David Filipetto (Australia) Nathan Gotch (Australia) Wayne Vinckx | 77 | Alfa Romeo 147 JTD | Thomson Alfa | 1 | H | 217 |
| 21 | (Australia) Darren Harris (Australia) Nick Lange (Australia) Lindsay Kearns | 93 | Proton Satria GTi | Lubrimaxx | 3 | F | 217 |
| 22 | (Australia) Joel Spychala (Australia) Lindsay Yelland (Australia) Alex Saliba | 17 | FPV GT-P | V8 Race Experience | 6 | B | 210 |
| 23 | (Australia) David Heath (Australia) Warren Luff (Australia) Ian Luff | 9 | Ford BF Falcon XR8 | Code Blue Motorsport | 3 | D | 193 |
| 24 | (Australia) Chris Delfsma (Australia) John Bowe (Australia) Paul Stubber | 21 | Ford BF Falcon XR8 | Century 21 | 4 | D | 183 |
| DNF | (Australia) David Mertens (Australia) Leigh Mertens (Australia) Terry Wyhoon | 71 | HSV VY GTS | G & D Performance | | B | 220 |
| DNF | (Australia) Richard Mork (Australia) David Turner (Australia) Richard Prince | 7 | Honda Integra Type R | V8 Racing | | E | 142 |
| DNF | (Australia) Mark King (Australia) Michael Trimble (Australia) Mark Brame | 34 | Mitsubishi Lancer Evo VIII | Mark King | | A | 137 |
| DNF | (Australia) Jake Camilleri (Australia) Scott Nicholas (Australia) Tim Sipp | 36 | Mazda 3 MPS | Grand Prix Mazda | | C | 108 |
| DNF | (Australia) Michael Brock (Australia) Garry Young (Australia) Jack Elsegood | 80 | Mitsubishi Lancer Evo VIII | Coopers/Brock Harcourts | | A | 77 |
| DNF | (Australia) Bob Pearson (Australia) Anton Mechtler (Australia) Jason Walsh | 33 | Mitsubishi Lancer Evo VIII | Pro-Duct Motorsport | | A | 76 |
| DNF | (Australia) Allan Shephard (Australia) Dennis Cribbin (Australia) Len Cave | 27 | Mazda 3 MPS | The Shire Conveyancer | | C | 71 |
| DNF | (Australia) Gary Deane (Australia) Rob Rubis | 91 | Subaru Impreza WRX STi | Humes | | A | 63 |
| DNF | (Australia) Cameron McConville (Australia) Nathan Pretty (Australia) Shane Price | 1 | Holden VE Commodore SS Sportwagon | Jack Daniels | | D | 30 |
| DNF | (Australia) Steve Briffa (Australia) Lee Holdsworth (Australia) Brett Holdsworth | 8 | Holden VY Commodore SS | Paul Wakeling Holden | | D | 6 |
| DNS | (Australia) Grant Sherrin (Australia) Iain Sherrin (Australia) Michael Sherrin | 16 | BMW 130i | Sherrin Motorsport | | C | |
| DNS | (Australia) Kean Booker (Australia) Rocco Rinaldo (Australia) David Stone | 76 | Alfa Romeo 159 2.4 JTD | Thomson Alfa | | G | |
