= 2004 Bob Jane T-Marts 1000 =

Motor race in Australia

Seasons
- ← 2003 2005 →

(New South Wales) 2004 Bob Jane T-Marts 1000
Event Information
- Round 10 of 13 in the 2004 V8 Supercar Championship Series
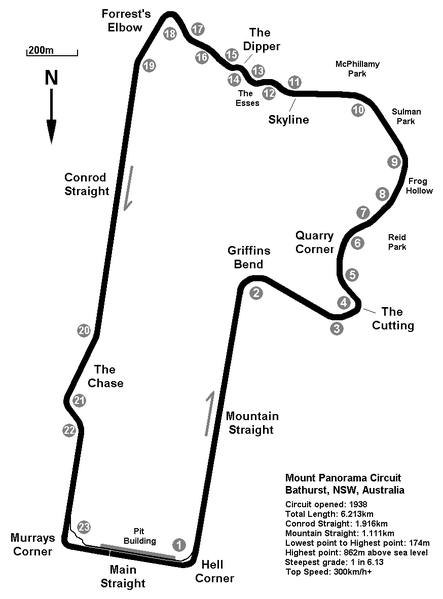
- Date: 7–10 October 2004
- Location: Bathurst, New South Wales
- Venue: Mount Panorama Circuit
- Weather: Fine

Results
Race 1
Distance	161 laps	1000 km
Pole position	(New Zealand) Steven Richards; Perkins Engineering	2:07.9611
Winner	(New Zealand) Greg Murphy (Australia) Rick Kelly; Kmart Racing Team	6:29:36.2055
Round Results
First	(New Zealand) Greg Murphy (Australia) Rick Kelly; Kmart Racing Team	192 pts
Second	(Australia) Craig Lowndes (Australia) Glenn Seton; Ford Performance Racing	188 pts
Third	(Australia) John Bowe (Australia) Brad Jones; Brad Jones Racing	184 pts

The 2004 Bob Jane T-Marts 1000 was a motor race for V8 Supercars, staged on 10 October 2004 at the Mount Panorama Circuit just outside Bathurst in New South Wales, Australia. It was Round 10 of the 2004 V8 Supercar Championship Series.

The event was the eighth Australia 1000, first held after the organisational split over the Bathurst 1000 that occurred in 1997. The race was staged four days after the 41st anniversary of the first Bathurst 500/1000 touring car endurance race which was held at the Mount Panorama Circuit in 1963. The 2004 event was the 47th race with a lineage back to the 1960 Armstrong 500 held at Phillip Island.

The race was won by 2003 winners Greg Murphy and Rick Kelly driving a Kmart Racing Team entered Holden Commodore (VY). It was the sixth consecutive Bathurst 1000 victory for Holden, a new record. The 2004 event was the 32nd and last Bathurst 500/1000 for nine time race winner Peter Brock. He did not get to drive in the actual race however as Jason Plato, his British co-driver in the #05 Holden Racing Team Holden Commodore (VY), crashed heavily on lap 31 with the Brad Jones Racing #21 Ford Falcon (BA) driven by John Cleland, putting the car (and Cleland's, which flipped in the crash, out of the race.

== Entry list ==
35 cars were entered in the race – 16 Ford Falcons and 19 Holden Commodores. Three cars were of the pre-2003 Group 3A regulation set. Amongst the debutants were former Formula One driver Alex Yoong, future championship race winners Fabian Coulthard and Lee Holdsworth and future New Zealand Touring Cars champion John McIntyre. Nine time Bathurst winner Peter Brock and 1988 race winner Tomas Mezera made their final start in the event.

No.	Drivers	Team (Sponsor)	Car	No.	Drivers	Team (Sponsor)	Car
1	(Australia) Marcos Ambrose (Australia) Greg Ritter	Stone Brothers Racing (Pirtek)	Ford Falcon (BA)	021	(New Zealand) Craig Baird (New Zealand) Mark Porter	Team Kiwi Racing (Hyundai Construction)	Holden Commodore (VY)
2	(Australia) Mark Skaife (Australia) Todd Kelly	Holden Racing Team (Holden, Mobil 1)	Holden Commodore (VY)	21	(Australia) Andrew Jones (United Kingdom) John Cleland	Brad Jones Racing (OzEmail)	Ford Falcon (BA)
3	(New Zealand) Jason Richards (New Zealand) Fabian Coulthard	Tasman Motorsport (Inner Circle Rum)	Holden Commodore (VY)	23	(Australia) David Besnard (New Zealand) John McIntyre	WPS Racing (WPS Financial Services)	Ford Falcon (BA)
05	(Australia) Peter Brock (United Kingdom) Jason Plato	Holden Racing Team (Holden, Mobil 1)	Holden Commodore (VY)	24	(Australia) Garth Walden (Australia) Grant Elliott	Walden Motorsport (Clubs NSW)	Ford Falcon (AU)
5	(Switzerland) Alain Menu (Australia) Adam Macrow	Ford Performance Racing (FPV, Ford Credit)	Ford Falcon (BA)	29	(Australia) Paul Morris (Australia) Alan Gurr	Paul Morris Motorsport (Sirromet Wines)	Holden Commodore (VY)
6	(Australia) Craig Lowndes (Australia) Glenn Seton	Ford Performance Racing (Caterpillar)	Ford Falcon (BA)	31	(Australia) Steven Ellery (Australia) Luke Youlden	Steven Ellery Racing (Supercheap Auto)	Ford Falcon (BA)
7	(Australia) Alex Davison (Australia) Jamie Whincup	Rod Nash Racing (Castrol Formula R)	Holden Commodore (VX)	33	(Australia) Nathan Pretty (Denmark) Allan Simonsen	Garry Rogers Motorsport (Valvoline, Repco)	Holden Commodore (VY)
8	(Australia) Paul Dumbrell (Australia) Tony Longhurst	Perkins Engineering (Castrol Formula R)	Holden Commodore (VY)	34	(Australia) Garth Tander (Australia) Cameron McConville	Garry Rogers Motorsport (Valvoline, Repco)	Holden Commodore (VY)
9	(Australia) Russell Ingall (Australia) Cameron McLean	Stone Brothers Racing (Caltex)	Ford Falcon (BA)	43	(Australia) Christian D'Agostin (Australia) Kurt Wimmer	John Faulkner Racing (Holden Young Lions)	Holden Commodore (VX)
10	(Australia) Jason Bargwanna (Australia) Mark Winterbottom	Larkham Motorsport (Orrcon Steel)	Ford Falcon (BA)	44	(New Zealand) Simon Wills (Australia) Paul Stokell	Team Dynamik (Dodo)	Holden Commodore (VY)
11	(New Zealand) Steven Richards (New Zealand) Jim Richards	Perkins Engineering (Castrol Formula R)	Holden Commodore (VY)	45	(Australia) Dale Brede (Australia) Will Davison	Team Dynamik (Dodo)	Holden Commodore (VY)
12	(Australia) Brad Jones (Australia) John Bowe	Brad Jones Racing (OzEmail)	Ford Falcon (BA)	48	(Australia) Neil McFadyen (Malaysia) Alex Yoong	WPS Racing (WPS Financial Services)	Ford Falcon (BA)
14	(Australia) Mark Noske (Australia) Lee Holdsworth	Robert Smith Racing (Smiths Trucks)	Holden Commodore (VY)	50	(Australia) Jason Bright (Australia) Paul Weel	Paul Weel Racing (PWR Performance Products)	Holden Commodore (VY)
15	(New Zealand) Greg Murphy (Australia) Rick Kelly	Kmart Racing Team (Kmart)	Holden Commodore (VY)	51	(Australia) Steve Owen (Australia) Tim Leahey	Kmart Racing Team (Kmart)	Holden Commodore (VY)
16	(Australia) Matthew White (Australia) Marcus Marshall	Paul Weel Racing (PWR Performance Products)	Holden Commodore (VY)	75	(Australia) Anthony Tratt (Australia) Tomas Mezera	Paul Little Racing (Toll Ipec)	Holden Commodore (VY)
17	(Australia) Steven Johnson (Australia) Warren Luff	Dick Johnson Racing (Shell Helix)	Ford Falcon (BA)	88	(New Zealand) Paul Radisich (Brazil) Max Wilson	Triple Eight Race Engineering (Betta Electrical)	Ford Falcon (BA)
18	(Australia) Owen Kelly (Australia) David Brabham	Dick Johnson Racing (Shell Helix)	Ford Falcon (BA)	888	(Australia) Dean Canto (France) Yvan Muller	Triple Eight Race Engineering (Betta Electrical)	Ford Falcon (BA)
20	(Australia) Mark Larkham (New Zealand) Matthew Halliday	Larkham Motorsport (Orrcon Steel)	Ford Falcon (BA)				

== Qualifying ==
=== Qualifying ===
Pos.	No.	Driver	Team	Car	Time	Gap	Grid
1	15	(New Zealand) Greg Murphy	Kmart Racing	Holden Commodore (VY)	2:08.0940		Top 10
2	50	(Australia) Jason Bright	Paul Weel Racing	Holden Commodore (VY)	2:08.1283	+0.0343	Top 10
3	11	(New Zealand) Steven Richards	Perkins Engineering	Holden Commodore (VY)	2:08.1363	+0.0423	Top 10
4	6	(Australia) Craig Lowndes	Ford Performance Racing	Ford Falcon (BA)	2:08.3637	+0.2697	Top 10
5	9	(Australia) Russell Ingall	Stone Brothers Racing	Ford Falcon (BA)	2:08.4064	+0.3124	Top 10
6	29	(Australia) Paul Morris	Paul Morris Motorsport	Holden Commodore (VY)	2:08.4906	+0.3966	Top 10
7	10	(Australia) Jason Bargwanna	Larkham Motor Sport	Ford Falcon (BA)	2:08.4963	+0.4023	Top 10
8	12	(Australia) John Bowe	Brad Jones Racing	Ford Falcon (BA)	2:08.5197	+0.4257	Top 10
9	8	(Australia) Paul Dumbrell	Perkins Engineering	Holden Commodore (VY)	2:08.5285	+0.4345	Top 10
10	1	(Australia) Marcos Ambrose	Stone Brothers Racing	Ford Falcon (BA)	2:08.5736	+0.4796	Top 10
11	34	(Australia) Garth Tander	Garry Rogers Motorsport	Holden Commodore (VY)	2:08.6075	+0.5135	11
12	51	(Australia) Steve Owen	Kmart Racing Team	Holden Commodore (VY)	2:08.6405	+0.5465	12
13	17	(Australia) Steven Johnson	Dick Johnson Racing	Ford Falcon (BA)	2:08.6747	+0.5807	13
14	31	(Australia) Steven Ellery	Steven Ellery Racing	Ford Falcon (BA)	2:08.6786	+0.5846	14
15	21	(Australia) Andrew Jones	Brad Jones Racing	Ford Falcon (BA)	2:08.7553	+0.6613	15
16	3	(New Zealand) Jason Richards	Tasman Motorsport	Holden Commodore (VY)	2:08.7926	+0.6986	16
17	888	(Australia) Dean Canto	Triple Eight Race Engineering	Ford Falcon (BA)	2:08.7949	+0.7009	17
18	2	(Australia) Mark Skaife	Holden Racing Team	Holden Commodore (VY)	2:08.8824	+0.7884	18
19	44	(New Zealand) Simon Wills	Team Dynamik	Holden Commodore (VY)	2:08.9469	+0.8529	19
20	16	(Australia) Matthew White	Paul Weel Racing	Holden Commodore (VY)	2:08.9482	+0.8542	20
21	23	(Australia) David Besnard	WPS Racing	Ford Falcon (BA)	2:09.2191	+1.1251	21
22	88	(Brazil) Max Wilson	Triple Eight Race Engineering	Ford Falcon (BA)	2:09.3980	+1.3040	22
23	021	(New Zealand) Craig Baird	Team Kiwi Racing	Holden Commodore (VY)	2:09.6889	+1.5949	23
24	18	(Australia) Owen Kelly	Dick Johnson Racing	Ford Falcon (BA)	2:10.3965	+2.3025	24
25	45	(Australia) Will Davison	Team Dynamik	Holden Commodore (VY)	2:10.4257	+2.3317	25
26	05	(Australia) Peter Brock	Holden Racing Team	Holden Commodore (VY)	2:10.5998	+2.5058	26
27	75	(Australia) Anthony Tratt	Paul Little Racing	Holden Commodore (VY)	2:10.7036	+2.6096	27
28	20	(Australia) Mark Larkham	Larkham Motor Sport	Ford Falcon (BA)	2:10.9504	+2.8564	28
29	7	(Australia) Alex Davison	Perkins Engineering	Holden Commodore (VX)	2:11.0541	+2.9601	29
30	33	(Denmark) Allan Simonsen	Garry Rogers Motorsport	Holden Commodore (VY)	2:11.1023	+3.0083	30
31	14	(Australia) Mark Noske	Robert Smith Racing	Holden Commodore (VY)	2:11.2652	+3.1712	31
32	48	(Malaysia) Alex Yoong	WPS Racing	Ford Falcon (BA)	2:12.2968	+4.2028	32
33	24	(Australia) Garth Walden	Walden Motorsport	Ford Falcon (AU)	2:13.2514	+5.1574	33
34	43	(Australia) Christian D'Agostin	John Faulkner Racing	Holden Commodore (VX)	2:13.8471	+5.7531	34
EXC	5	(Switzerland) Alain Menu	Ford Performance Racing	Ford Falcon (BA)	EXC		35

=== Top 10 Shootout ===
Pos	No	Team	Driver	Car	Time
Pole	11	Perkins Engineering	(New Zealand) Steven Richards	Holden Commodore (VY)	2:07.9611
2	50	Paul Weel Racing	(Australia) Jason Bright	Holden Commodore (VY)	2:07.9623
3	8	Perkins Engineering	(Australia) Paul Dumbrell	Holden Commodore (VY)	2:08.0360
4	15	Kmart Racing Team	(New Zealand) Greg Murphy	Holden Commodore (VY)	2:08.1177
5	1	Stone Brothers Racing	(Australia) Marcos Ambrose	Ford Falcon (BA)	2:08.4490
6	12	Brad Jones Racing	(Australia) John Bowe	Ford Falcon (BA)	2:08.5537
7	29	Team Sirromet Wines	(Australia) Paul Morris	Holden Commodore (VY)	2:08.6920
8	9	Stone Brothers Racing	(Australia) Russell Ingall	Ford Falcon (BA)	2:08.9525
9	6	Ford Performance Racing	(Australia) Craig Lowndes	Ford Falcon (BA)	2:09.4096
10	10	Larkham Motor Sport	(Australia) Jason Bargwanna	Ford Falcon (BA)	2:09.4531

=== Starting grid ===
The following table represents the final starting grid for the race on Sunday:

Inside row					Outside row				
1	(New Zealand) Steven Richards (New Zealand) Jim Richards	11			50	(Australia) Jason Bright (Australia) Paul Weel			2
1	Perkins Engineering (Holden Commodore (VY))				Paul Weel Racing (Holden Commodore (VY))				2
3			(Australia) Paul Dumbrell (Australia) Tony Longhurst	8			15	(New Zealand) Greg Murphy (Australia) Rick Kelly	4
3			Perkins Engineering (Holden Commodore (VY))				K-Mart Racing Team (Holden Commodore (VY))		4
5	(Australia) Marcos Ambrose (Australia) Greg Ritter	1			12	(Australia) John Bowe (Australia) Brad Jones			6
5	Stone Brothers Racing (Ford Falcon (BA))				Brad Jones Racing (Ford Falcon (BA))				6
7			(Australia) Paul Morris (Australia) Alan Gurr	29			9	(Australia) Russell Ingall (Australia) Cameron McLean	8
7			Paul Morris Motorsport (Holden Commodore (VY))				Stone Brothers Racing (Ford Falcon (BA))		8
9	(Australia) Craig Lowndes (Australia) Glenn Seton	6			10	(Australia) Jason Bargwanna (Australia) Mark Winterbottom			10
9	Ford Performance Racing (Ford Falcon (BA))				Larkham Motor Sport (Ford Falcon (BA))				10
11			(Australia) Garth Tander (Australia) Cameron McConville	34			51	(Australia) Steve Owen (Australia) Tim Leahey	12
11			Garry Rogers Motorsport (Holden Commodore (VY))				K-Mart Racing Team (Holden Commodore (VY))		12
13	(Australia) Steven Johnson (Australia) Warren Luff	17			31	(Australia) Steven Ellery (Australia) Luke Youlden			14
13	Dick Johnson Racing (Ford Falcon (BA))				Steven Ellery Racing (Ford Falcon (BA))				14
15			(Australia) Andrew Jones (United Kingdom) John Cleland	21			3	(New Zealand) Jason Richards (New Zealand) Fabian Coulthard	16
15			Brad Jones Racing (Ford Falcon (BA))				Tasman Motorsport (Holden Commodore (VY))		16
17	(Australia) Dean Canto (France) Yvan Muller	888			2	(Australia) Mark Skaife (Australia) Todd Kelly			18
17	Triple Eight Race Engineering (Ford Falcon (BA))				Holden Racing Team (Holden Commodore (VY))				18
19			(New Zealand) Simon Wills (Australia) Paul Stokell	44			16	(Australia) Matthew White (Australia) Marcus Marshall	20
19			Team Dynamik (Holden Commodore (VY))				Paul Weel Racing (Holden Commodore (VY))		20
21	(Australia) David Besnard (New Zealand) John McIntyre	23			88	(New Zealand) Paul Radisić (Brazil) Max Wilson			22
21	WPS Racing (Ford Falcon (BA))				Triple Eight Race Engineering (Ford Falcon (BA))				22
23			(New Zealand) Craig Baird (New Zealand) Mark Porter	021			18	(Australia) Owen Kelly (Australia) David Brabham	24
23			Team Kiwi Racing (Holden Commodore (VY))				Dick Johnson Racing (Ford Falcon (BA))		24
25	(Australia) Dale Brede (Australia) Will Davison	45			05	(Australia) Peter Brock (United Kingdom) Jason Plato			26
25	Team Dynamik (Holden Commodore (VY))				Holden Racing Team (Holden Commodore (VY))				26
27			(Australia) Anthony Tratt (Australia) Tomas Mezera	75			20	(Australia) Mark Larkham (New Zealand) Matthew Halliday	28
27			Paul Little Racing (Holden Commodore (VY))				Larkham Motor Sport (Ford Falcon (BA))		28
29	(Australia) Alex Davison (Australia) Jamie Whincup	7			33	(Australia) Nathan Pretty (Denmark) Allan Simonsen			30
29	Rod Nash Racing (Holden Commodore (VX))				Garry Rogers Motorsport (Holden Commodore (VY))				30
31			(Australia) Mark Noske (Australia) Lee Holdsworth	14			48	(Australia) Neil McFadyen (Malaysia) Alex Yoong	32
31			Robert Smith Racing (Holden Commodore (VY))				WPS Racing (Ford Falcon (BA))		32
33	(Australia) Garth Walden (Australia) Grant Elliot	24			43	(Australia) Christian D'Agostin (Australia) Kurt Wimmer			34
33	Walden Motorsport (Ford Falcon (AU))				John Faulkner Racing (Holden Commodore (VX))				34
35			(Switzerland) Alain Menu (Australia) Adam Macrow	5					
35			Ford Performance Racing (Ford Falcon (BA))						

== Race results ==
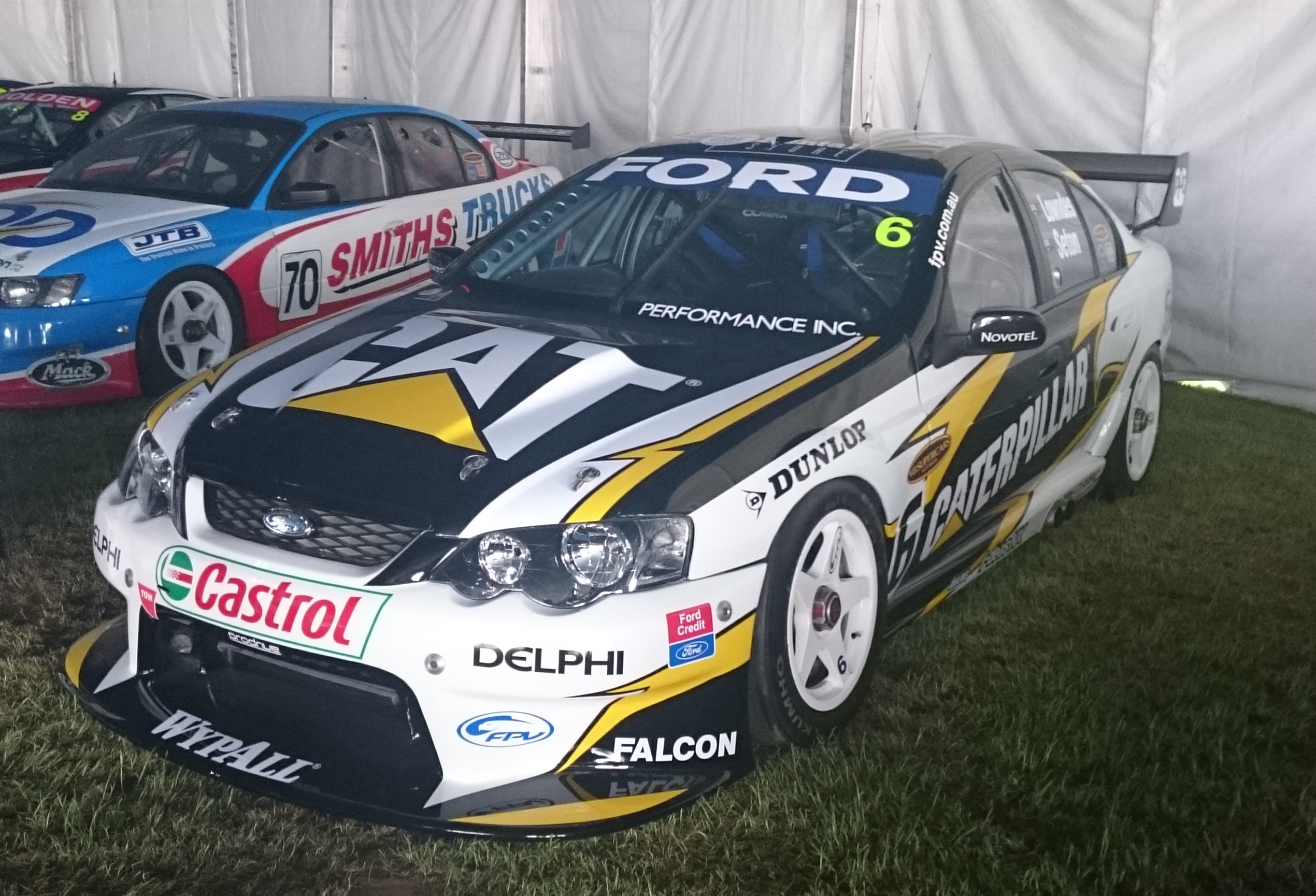
Craig Lowndes and Glenn Seton placed second driving this Ford Falcon (BA) for Ford Performance Racing. The image was taken in 2018.

Pos	No	Team	Drivers	Car	Laps	Time/Retired	Grid	Points
1	15	K-Mart Racing Team	(New Zealand) Greg Murphy (Australia) Rick Kelly	Holden Commodore (VY)	161	6:29:36.2055	4	192
2	6	Ford Performance Racing	(Australia) Craig Lowndes (Australia) Glenn Seton	Ford Falcon (BA)	161	+9.5738	9	188
3	12	Brad Jones Racing	(Australia) John Bowe (Australia) Brad Jones	Ford Falcon (BA)	161	+20.2199	6	184
4	1	Stone Brothers Racing	(Australia) Marcos Ambrose (Australia) Greg Ritter	Ford Falcon (BA)	161	+30.6895	5	180
5	10	Larkham Motor Sport	(Australia) Jason Bargwanna (Australia) Mark Winterbottom	Ford Falcon (BA)	161	+32.2040	10	176
6	9	Stone Brothers Racing	(Australia) Russell Ingall (Australia) Cameron McLean	Ford Falcon (BA)	161	+48.8422	8	172
7	17	Dick Johnson Racing	(Australia) Steven Johnson (Australia) Warren Luff	Ford Falcon (BA)	161	+56.4477	13	168
8	51	K-Mart Racing Team	(Australia) Steve Owen (Australia) Tim Leahey	Holden Commodore (VY)	160	+1 lap	12	164
9	7	Perkins Engineering	(Australia) Alex Davison (Australia) Jamie Whincup	Holden Commodore (VX)	160	+1 lap	29	160
10	33	Garry Rogers Motorsport	(Australia) Nathan Pretty (Denmark) Allan Simonsen	Holden Commodore (VY)	160	+1 lap	30	156
11	20	Larkham Motor Sport	(Australia) Mark Larkham (New Zealand) Matt Halliday	Ford Falcon (BA)	160	+1 lap	28	152
12	50	Paul Weel Racing	(Australia) Jason Bright (Australia) Paul Weel	Holden Commodore (VY)	159	+2 laps	2	148
13	44	Team Dynamik	(New Zealand) Simon Wills (Australia) Paul Stokell	Holden Commodore (VY)	159	+2 laps	19	144
14	2	Holden Racing Team	(Australia) Mark Skaife (Australia) Todd Kelly	Holden Commodore (VY)	159	+2 laps	18	140
15	48	WPS Racing	(Australia) Neil McFadyen (Malaysia) Alex Yoong	Ford Falcon (BA)	159	+2 laps	32	136
16	31	Steven Ellery Racing	(Australia) Steven Ellery (Australia) Luke Youlden	Ford Falcon (BA)	158	+3 laps	14	132
17	18	Dick Johnson Racing	(Australia) Owen Kelly (Australia) David Brabham	Ford Falcon (BA)	157	+4 laps	24	128
18	75	Paul Little Racing	(Australia) Anthony Tratt (Australia) Tomas Mezera	Holden Commodore (VY)	157	+4 laps	27	124
19	43	John Faulkner Racing	(Australia) Christian D'Agostin (Australia) Kurt Wimmer	Holden Commodore (VX)	157	+4 laps	34	120
20	3	Tasman Motorsport	(New Zealand) Jason Richards (New Zealand) Fabian Coulthard	Holden Commodore (VY)	152	+9 laps	16	116
21	11	Perkins Engineering	(New Zealand) Steven Richards (New Zealand) Jim Richards	Holden Commodore (VY)	148	+13 laps	1	112
DNF	888	Triple Eight Race Engineering	(Australia) Dean Canto (France) Yvan Muller	Ford Falcon (BA)	138	Crash	17	
DNF	34	Garry Rogers Motorsport	(Australia) Garth Tander (Australia) Cameron McConville	Holden Commodore (VY)	133	Crash	11	
DNF	8	Perkins Engineering	(Australia) Paul Dumbrell (Australia) Tony Longhurst	Holden Commodore (VY)	129	Crash	3	
DNF	021	Team Kiwi Racing	(New Zealand) Craig Baird (New Zealand) Mark Porter	Holden Commodore (VY)	129	Lap Time Limit	23	
DNF	88	Triple Eight Race Engineering	(New Zealand) Paul Radisich (Brazil) Max Wilson	Ford Falcon (BA)	116	Suspension	22	
DNF	23	WPS Racing	(Australia) David Besnard (New Zealand) John McIntyre	Ford Falcon (BA)	99	Engine	21	
DNF	14	Robert Smith Racing	(Australia) Mark Noske (Australia) Lee Holdsworth	Holden Commodore (VY)	59	Crash damage	31	
DNF	29	Paul Morris Motorsport	(Australia) Paul Morris (Australia) Alan Gurr	Holden Commodore (VY)	50	Crash	7	
DNF	45	Team Dynamik	(Australia) Dale Brede (Australia) Will Davison	Holden Commodore (VY)	49		25	
DNF	5	Ford Performance Racing	(Switzerland) Alain Menu (Australia) Adam Macrow	Ford Falcon (BA)	43	Steering	35	
DNF	21	Brad Jones Racing	(Australia) Andrew Jones (United Kingdom) John Cleland	Ford Falcon (BA)	29	Crash	15	
DNF	05	Holden Racing Team	(Australia) Peter Brock (United Kingdom) Jason Plato	Holden Commodore (VY)	27	Crash	26	
DNF	24	Walden Motorsport	(Australia) Garth Walden (Australia) Grant Elliott	Ford Falcon (AU)	18	Crash	33	
DNS	16	Paul Weel Racing	(Australia) Matthew White (Australia) Marcus Marshall	Holden Commodore (VY)		Crash in Friday Qualifying		

== Statistics ==
- Provisional Pole Position (set in Qualifying) - #15 Greg Murphy - 2:08.0940
- Pole Position (set in Top 10 Shootout) - #11 Steven Richards - 2:07.9611
- Race time of winning car - 6:29:36.2055
- Race Average Speed - 154 km/h
- Winning margin - 9.5738s
- Fastest Lap - #50 Jason Bright - 2:08.8927 (173.52 km/h) on lap 94

== Broadcast ==
Network 10 broadcast the race for the eighth consecutive year, dating back to the 1997 5.0L race. Journalist Paul Gover made a cameo appearance as a pit reporter, whilst multiple drivers made pundit appearances mid-race from their respective garages.

Network 10
Booth: Neil Crompton, Bill Woods
Pit-lane: Daryl Beattie, Paul Gover, Greg Rust
