= Garth Walden =

Australian race driver

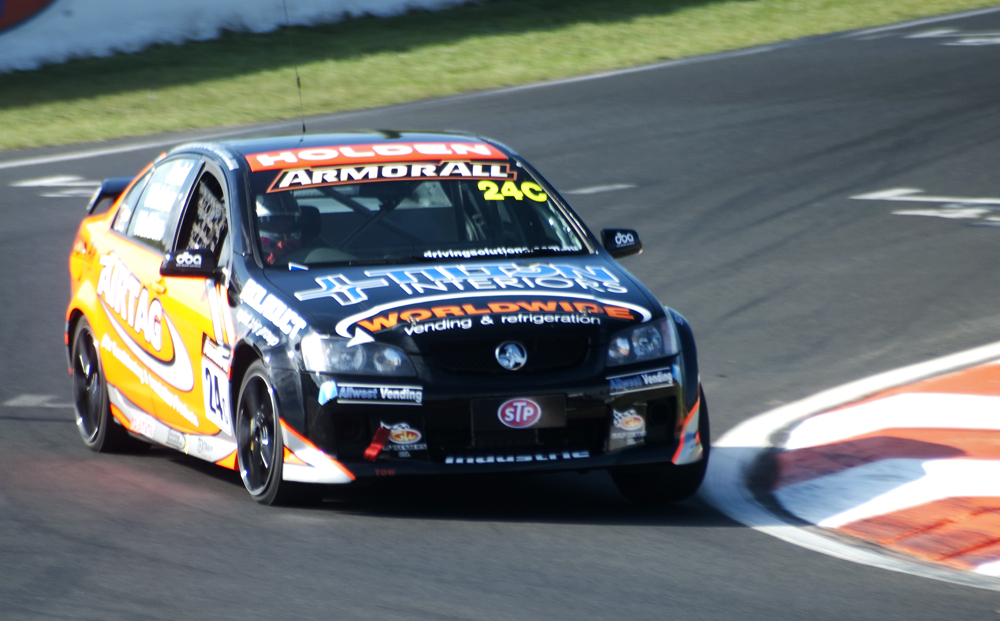
- Nationality: (Australia) Australian
- Born: 6 December 1981 (age 44) Port Macquarie, New South Wales

Supercars Championship career
- Current team: Walden Racing
- Championships: 0
- Races: 8
- Wins: 0
- Podiums: 0
- Pole positions: 0
- 2004 position: 47th

Garth William Walden (born 6 December 1981) is a racing driver from Australia. He is the son of Sydney-based racecar builder and driver Brian Walden.

== Biography ==
Walden began his career in supersprints in a Holden Monaro HQ, before switching to NSW Sports Sedans in a modified Holden Torana LJ.

Walden entered V8 Supercars in 2004, running an older-specification ex-Glenn Seton Racing Ford Falcon AU. Having originally intended to run in the Konica Series, the Waldens' purchased the Romano Racing main series Racing Entitlements Contract. Running with support from Bap Romano and Ford Performance Racing, Walden contested six of the thirteen events – failing to qualify for the Winton round and crashing out of the Bathurst 1000. AVESCO stripped the team of their licence at the conclusion of the season, handing it over to Perkins Engineering.

Following his V8 Supercars foray, Walden opened his own vehicle preparation shop – running in Australian Formula 3 in 2005 and the Australian Production Car Championship in 2007, as well as operating the HPM Racing outfit in the 2007 Fujitsu V8 Supercar Series.

In 2008, Walden re-secured his V8 Supercars REC with the intention of operating a Holden Commodore VE. With a car not forthcoming, and an attempt to purchase an ex-WPS Racing Ford Falcon BF falling through, the team did not participate in any races that season and the licence was sold to Walkinshaw Racing at the end of the year. Walden later made two one-off starts in the Development Series, in 2009 and 2014 respectively.

Walden was employed as a factory Radical Sportscars driver and manager in the late-2000s, and later ran in the World Time Attack Challenge and Porsche Carrera Cup Australia. Since 2020, Walden has been a semi-regular competitor in GT World Challenge Australia.

== Career stats ==
| Season | Series | Position | Car | Team |
|---|---|---|---|---|
| 2004 | V8Supercar Championship Series | 47th | Ford Falcon (AU) | Walden Motorsport |
| 2007 | Australian Production Car Championship | 8th | Holden Commodore VY | Walden Motorsport |
| 2007 | Australian Production Car Championship - Class A | **3rd** | Holden Commodore VY | Walden Motorsport |
| 2008 | Australian GT Championship | 28th | Lotus Exige S | Report Factory |
| 2009 | Fujitsu V8 Supercar Series | 30th | Holden Commodore (VZ) | Jay Motorsport |
| 2010 | Supersports & Sports 1300 Interstate Challenge Australia | **2nd** | Radical SR3 - Suzuki | Walden Motorsport |
| 2014 | New South Wales Supersports Championship | 9th | Radical SR8 Electric | Walden Motorsport |
| 2014 | Dunlop V8 Supercar Series | 41st | Holden Commodore (VE) | RSport Engineering |
| 2015 | World Time Attack Challenge | **1st** | Mitsubishi Evo 9 | Tilton Racing |
| 2016 | Porsche Carrera Cup Australia | 15th | Porsche 911 GT3 Cup | Walden Motorsport |
| 2017 | Porsche Carrera Cup Australia | 23rd | Porsche 911 GT3 Cup | Walden Motorsport |
| 2017 | Australian Production Car Series | 25th | Mercedes-Benz A45 AMG | Walden Motorsport |
| 2019 | New South Wales Supersports Championship | 7th | Radical SR3 - Suzuki | Walden Motorsport |

=== Complete Supercar results ===
(key) (Races in bold indicate pole position) (Races in italics indicate fastest lap)

| Year | Team | Car | 1 | 2 | 3 | 4 | 5 | 6 | 7 | 8 | 9 | 10 | 11 | 12 | 13 | 14 | Position | Points |
|---|---|---|---|---|---|---|---|---|---|---|---|---|---|---|---|---|---|---|
| 2004 | Walden Motorsport | Ford Falcon (AU) | ADE | EAS | PUK | HID | BAR | QLD; 22 | WIN; DNQ | ORA; 33 | SAN; 24 | BAT; Ret | SUR | SYM | EAS; 34 | | 47th | 185 |
| 2008 | Walden Motorsport | Holden Commodore (VE) | ADE; WD | EAS | HAM | BAR | SAN | HID | QLD | WIN | PHI | BAT | SUR | BHR | SYM | ORA | NC | 0 |

=== Complete Super2 Series results ===
(key) (Round results only)

Super2 Series results
| Year | Team | Car | 1 | 2 | 3 | 4 | 5 | 6 | 7 | Position | Points |
|---|---|---|---|---|---|---|---|---|---|---|---|
| 2009 | Jay Motorsport | Holden Commodore (VZ) | ADE | WIN | TOW | SAN | QLD | BAT | HOM; 12 | 30th | 123 |
| 2014 | RSport Engineering | Holden Commodore (VE) | ADE | WIN; 23 | BAR | TOW | QLD | BAT | HOM | 41st | 75 |

=== Complete Bathurst 12 Hour results ===
| Year | Team | Co-drivers | Car | Class | Laps | Overall position | Class position |
|---|---|---|---|---|---|---|---|
| 2007 | (Australia) Walden Motorsport | (Australia) Michael Auld (Australia) Brian Walden | Holden Commodore (VY) SS | D | 188 | 24th | 4th |
| 2008 | (Australia) Walden Motorsport | (Australia) Michael Auld (Australia) Brian Walden | Holden Commodore (VY) SS | D | 236 | 9th | **1st** |
| 2009 | (Australia) Walden Motorsport | (Australia) Michael Auld (Australia) Brian Walden | Holden Commodore (VY) SS | E | 228 | 9th | **1st** |
| 2010 | (Australia) Walden Motorsport | (Australia) Michael Auld (Australia) Brian Walden | Holden Commodore (VY) SS | C | 68 | DNF | |
| 2013 | (Australia) AMAC Motorsport | (Australia) Andrew MacPherson (Australia) Benjamin Porter | Mosler MT900 GT3 | A | 55 | DNF | |
| 2014 | (Australia) AMAC Motorsport | (Australia) Andrew MacPherson (Australia) Benjamin Porter | Porsche 997 GT3 Cup S | B | 237 | 21st | 7th |
| 2020 | (Australia) Hobson Motorsport/GWR | (Australia) Brett Hobson (Australia) Kurt Kostecki | Nissan GT-R Nismo GT3 (2015) | Silver | 288 | 21st | 5th |
| 2022 | (Australia) RAM Motorsport | (Australia) Brett Hobson (Australia) Mike Sheargold | Mercedes-AMG GT3 Evo | AAM | 170 | DNF | |
| 2024 | (Australia) Erebus Motorsport | (Australia) Jack Le Brocq (Australia) Justin McMillan (Australia) Glen Wood | Mercedes-AMG GT3 Evo | Pro-Am | 259 | 16th | 5th |

=== Complete Dubai 24 Hour results ===
| Year | Team | Co-drivers | Car | Class | Laps | Overall position | Class position |
|---|---|---|---|---|---|---|---|
| 2025 | GWR Australia | (Australia) Brett Hobson (Australia) Justin McMillan (Australia) Glen Wood (Australia) Michael Sheargold | Mercedes-AMG GT3 Evo | GT3-Am | 280 | 31st | 10th |
