= Walden Motorsport =

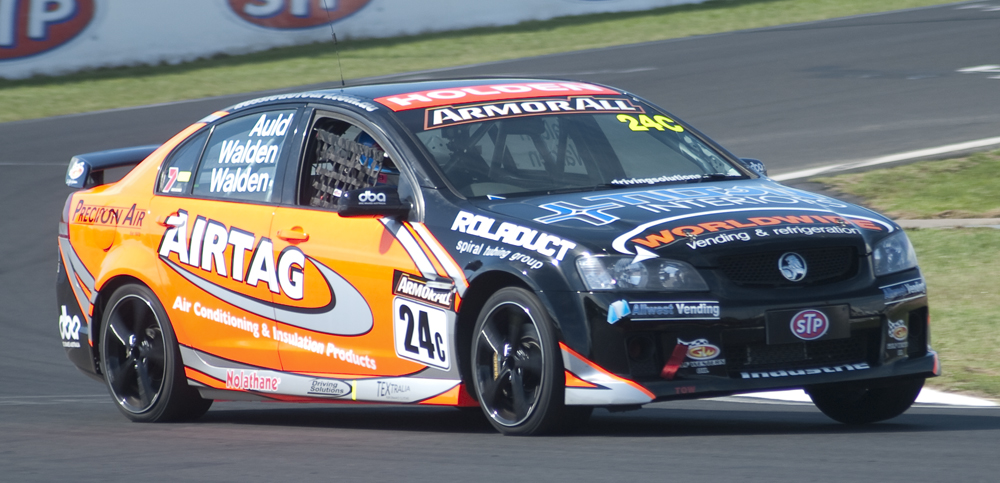
- Team Principal: Brian Walden
- Debut: 2004
- Final Season: 2004
- Round wins: 0
- Pole positions: 0

Walden Motorsport is a specialist race car preparation outfit in Western Sydney owned by Brian Walden.

== History ==
Running in Production Car and Improved Production Car events, it entered the 1997 ARDC AMSCAR series and Bathurst 1000 with an ex Terry Finnigan Holden Commodore (VP). In 2004, the team debuted in the main V8 Supercar series at round 6 with Brian's son Garth driving an ex Glenn Seton Racing Ford Falcon (AU) using a franchise leased from Romano Racing.

At the end of 2004, Walden Motorsport concluded a deal to purchase the Romano Racing franchise, however V8 Supercars refused to sanction the sale.

The team was awarded a licence in 2007 and appeared on the entry list for the 2008 season, but never appeared with the licence put up for sale.

In 2007 Walden Motorsport entered a Commodore VY in the Australian Production Car Championship and with modest success and Bathurst 12 Hour races with class wins 2008 and 2009.

=== Complete Bathurst 1000 results ===
Year	No.	Car	Drivers	Position	Laps
2004	24	Ford Falcon (AU)	(Australia) Garth Walden (Australia) Grant Elliot	DNF	18
