= 2017 Hi-Tec Oils Bathurst 6 Hour =

Motor racing competition

Layout of the Mount Panorama Circuit

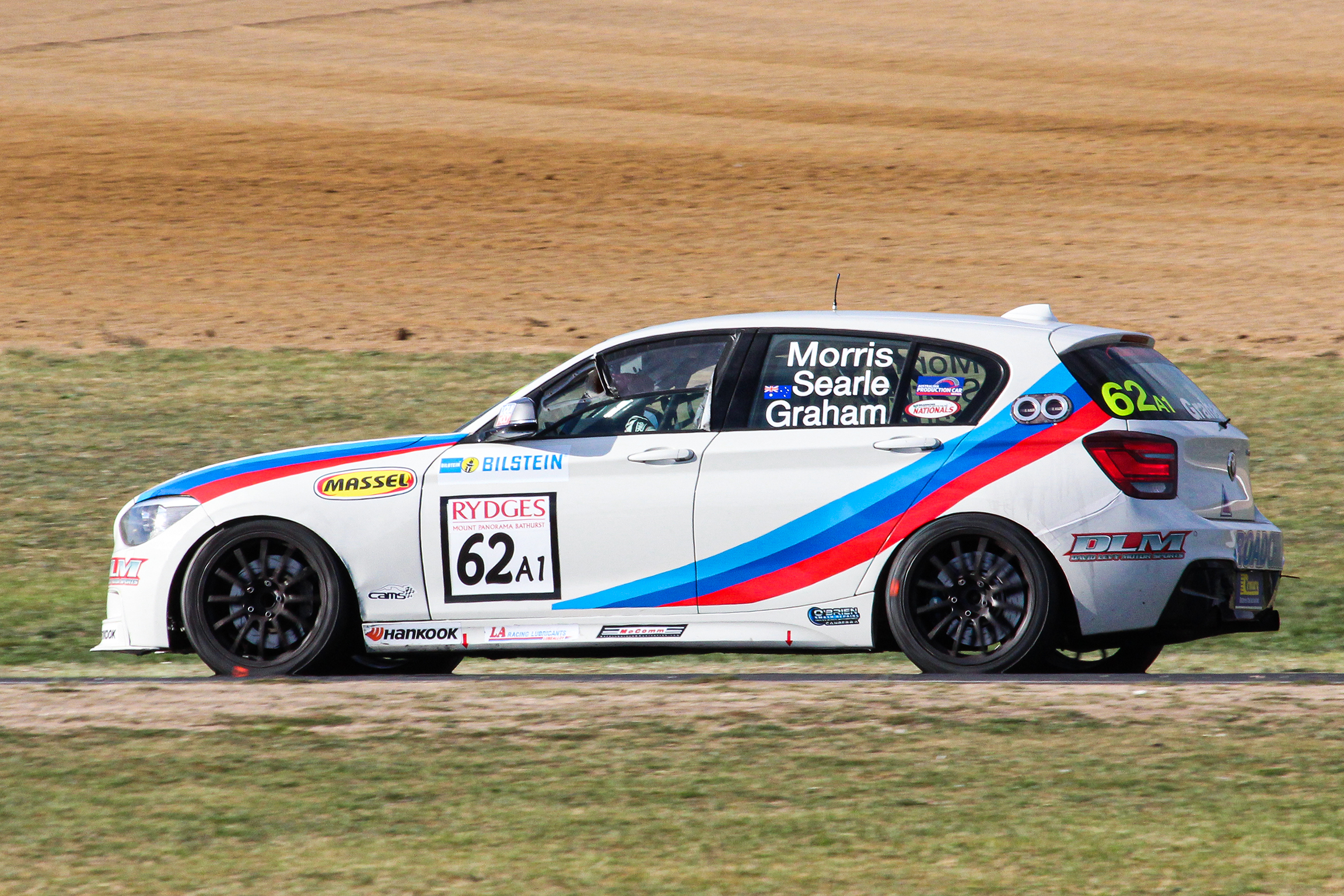
The race and Class A1-winning BMW M135i Hatch F20 of Luke Searle and Paul Morris.

The 2017 Hi-Tec Oils Bathurst 6 Hour was an endurance race for Group 3E Series Production Cars and other invited cars. The event, which was staged at the Mount Panorama Circuit, near Bathurst, in New South Wales, Australia, on 16 April 2017, was the second running of the Bathurst 6 Hour. The race was won by Luke Searle and Paul Morris, driving a BMW M135i. Morris became the first driver to win the three major endurance races at Bathurst, having previously won the Bathurst 1000 in 2014 and the Bathurst 12 Hour in 2007 and 2010. This feat was later achieved by Shane van Gisbergen.

== Class structure ==
Cars competed in the following classes:

- Class A1: Extreme Performance (Forced Induction)
- Class A2: Extreme Performance (Naturally Aspirated)
- Class B1: High Performance (Forced Induction)
- Class B2: High Performance (Naturally Aspirated)
- Class C: Performance
- Class D: Production
- Class I: Invitational

== Results ==
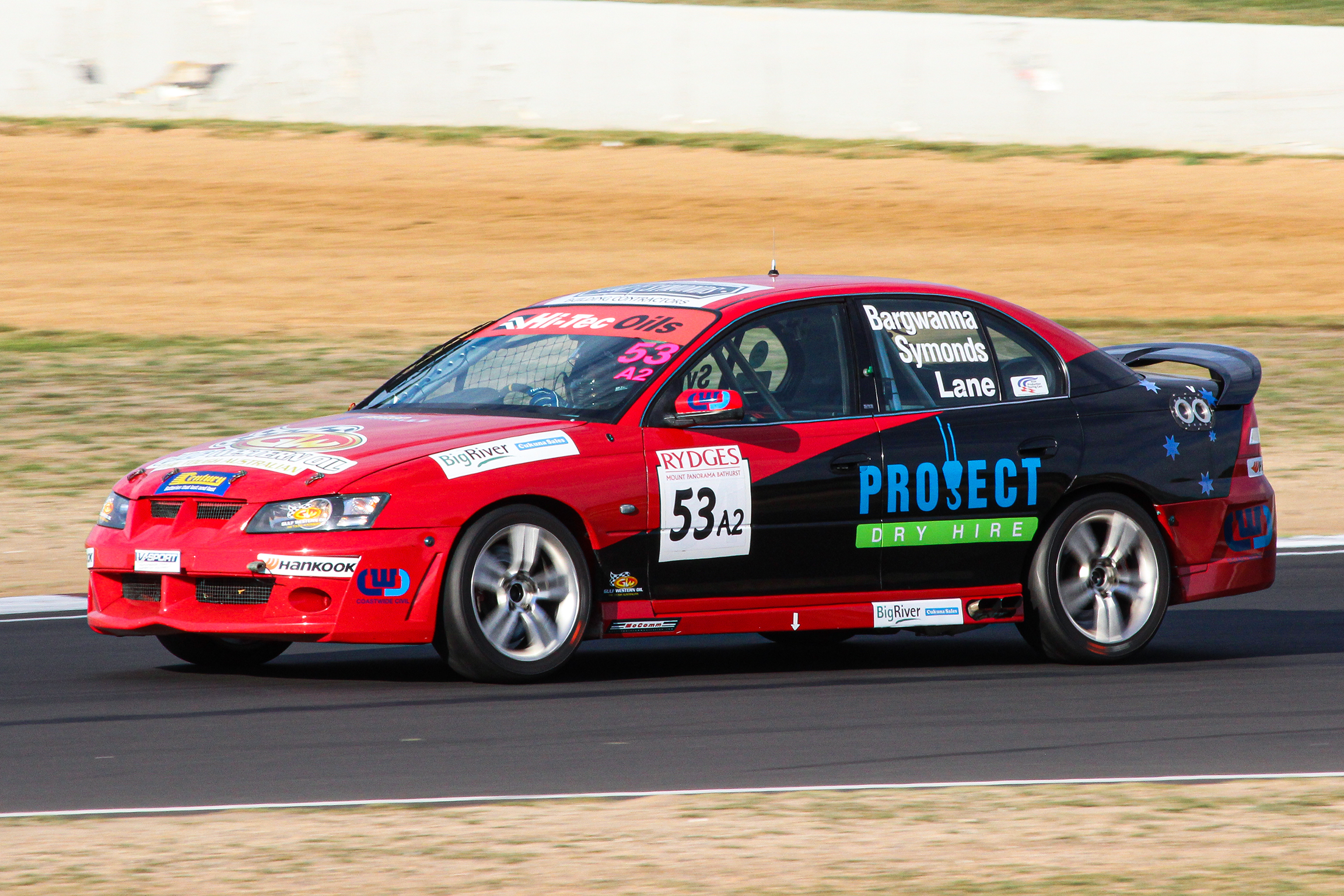
The Class A2-winning HSV VY GTS of Trevor Symonds, Paul Lane and Scott Bargwanna.

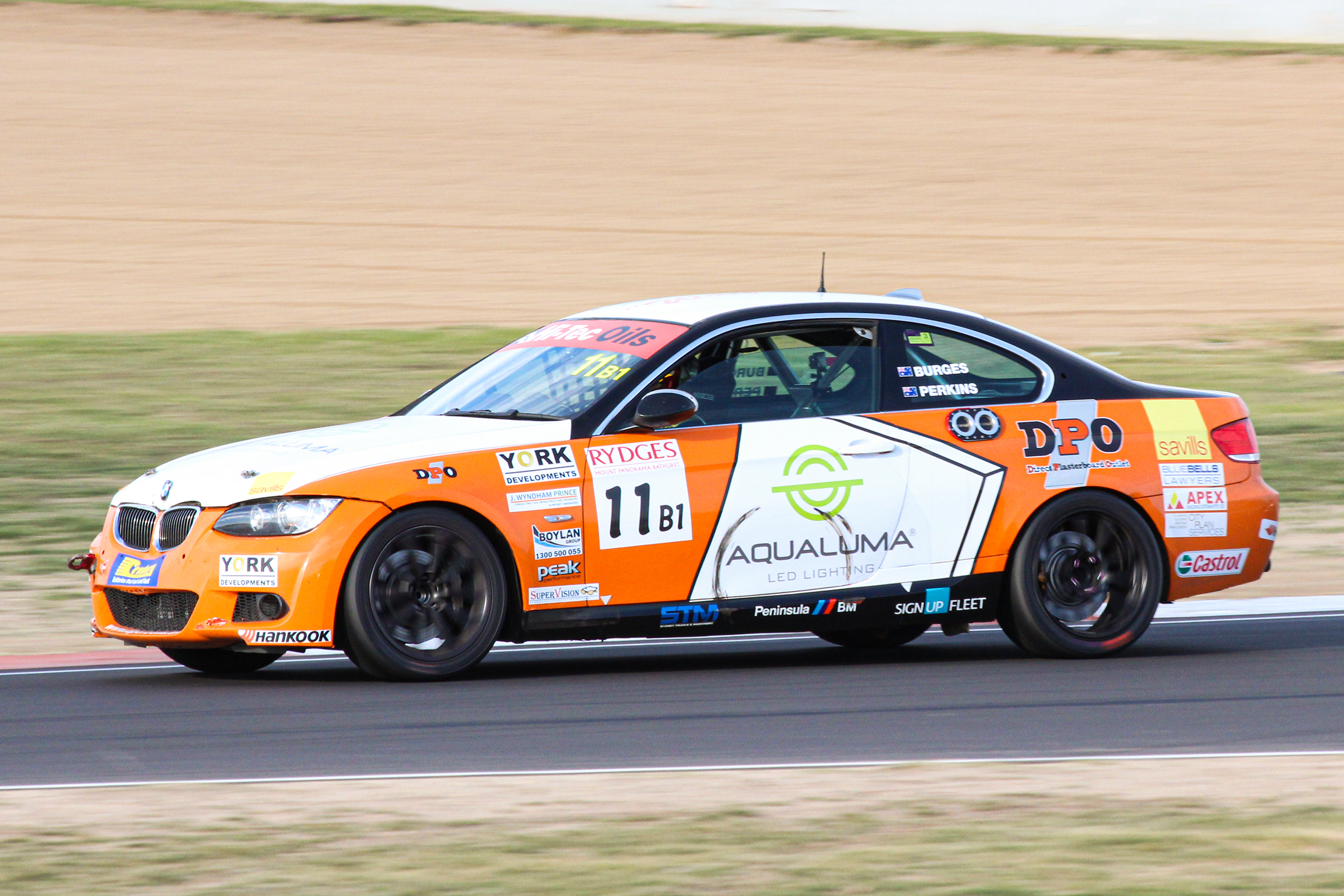
The Class B1-winning BMW 335i E92 of Leigh Burges and Jack Perkins.

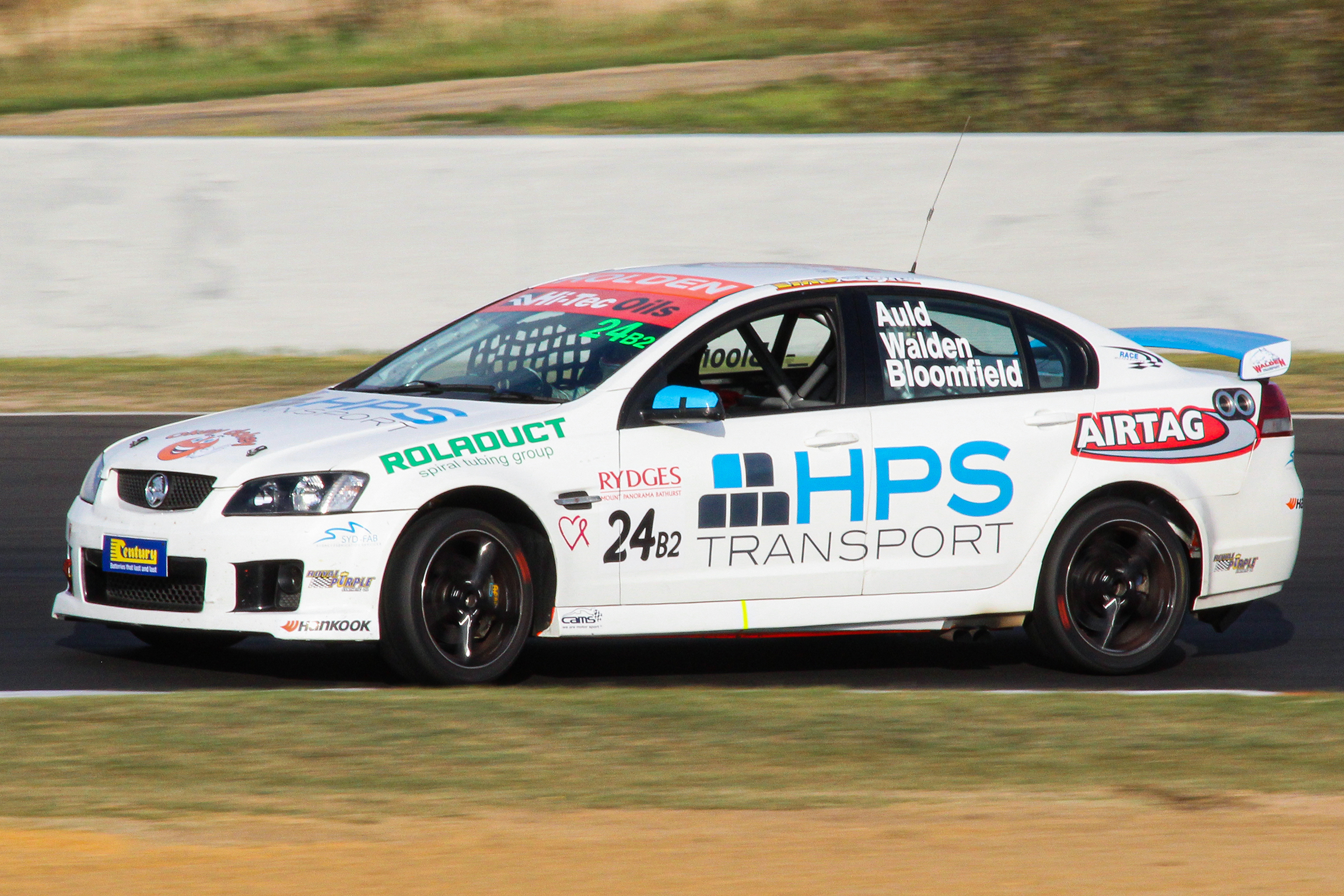
The Class B2-winning Holden VE Commodore SS V Redline of Brian Walden, Michael Auld and Richard Bloomfield.

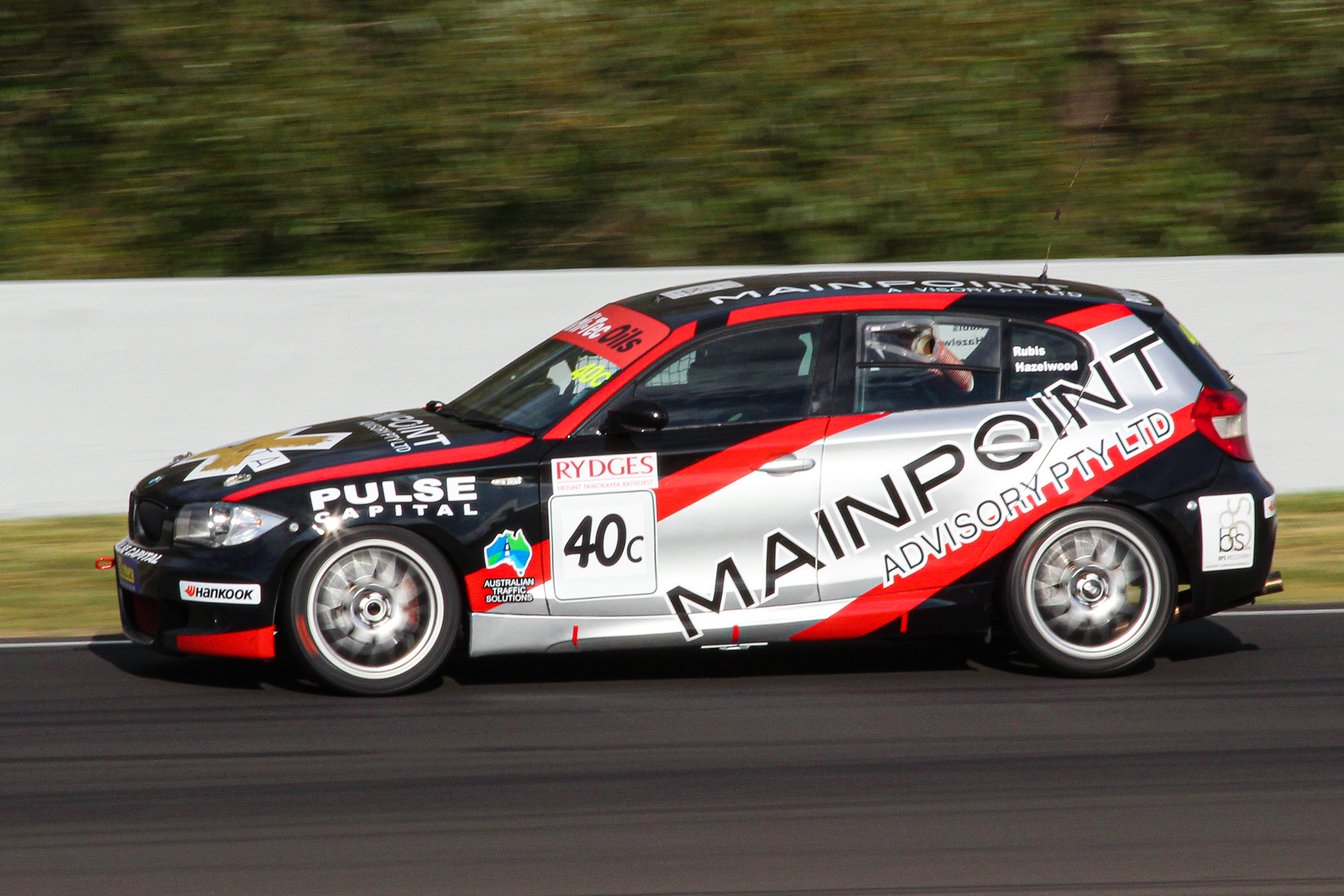
The Class C-winning BMW 130i E87 of Robert Rubis and Todd Hazelwood.

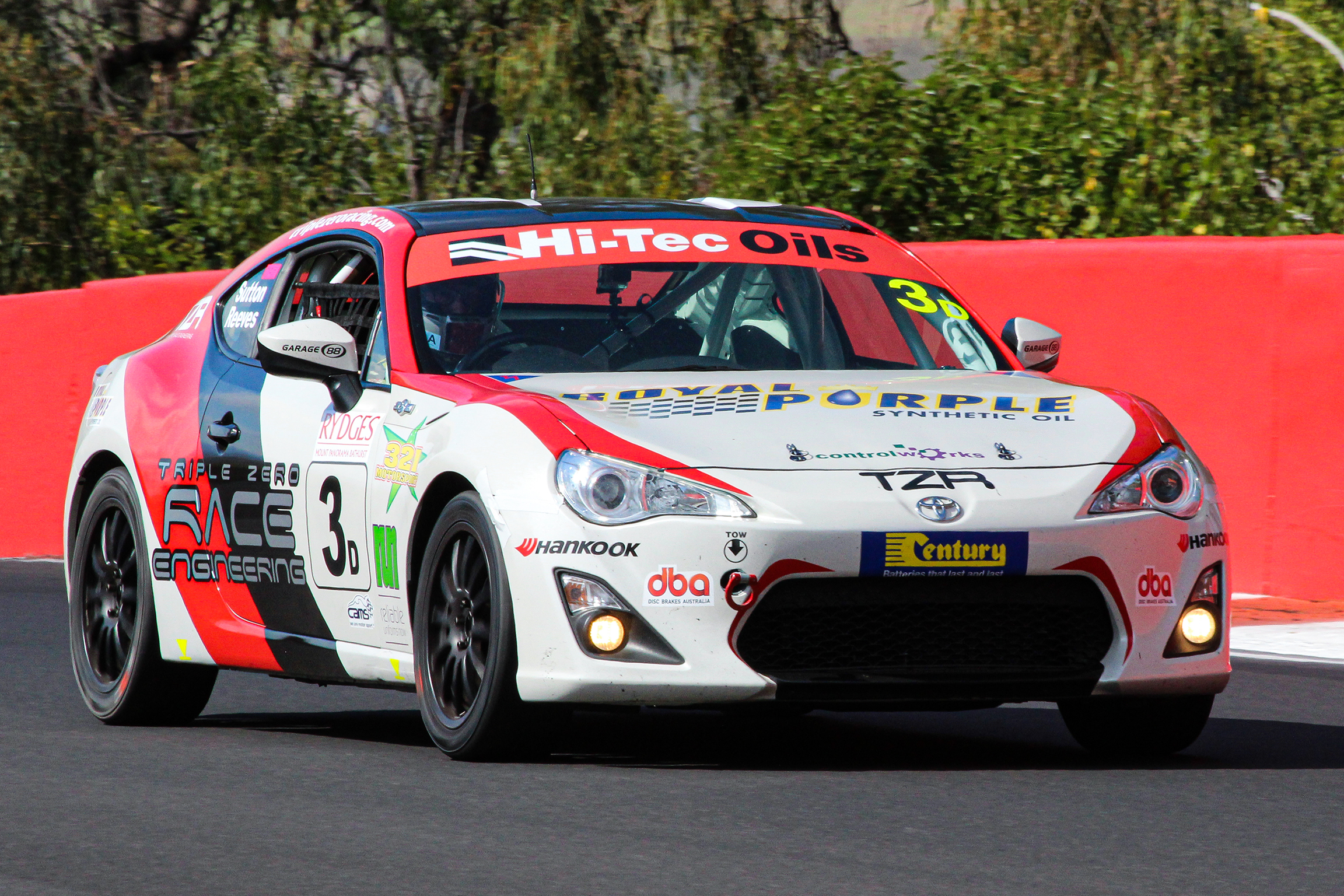
The Class D-winning Toyota 86 GTS of Chris Reeves and Chris Sutton.

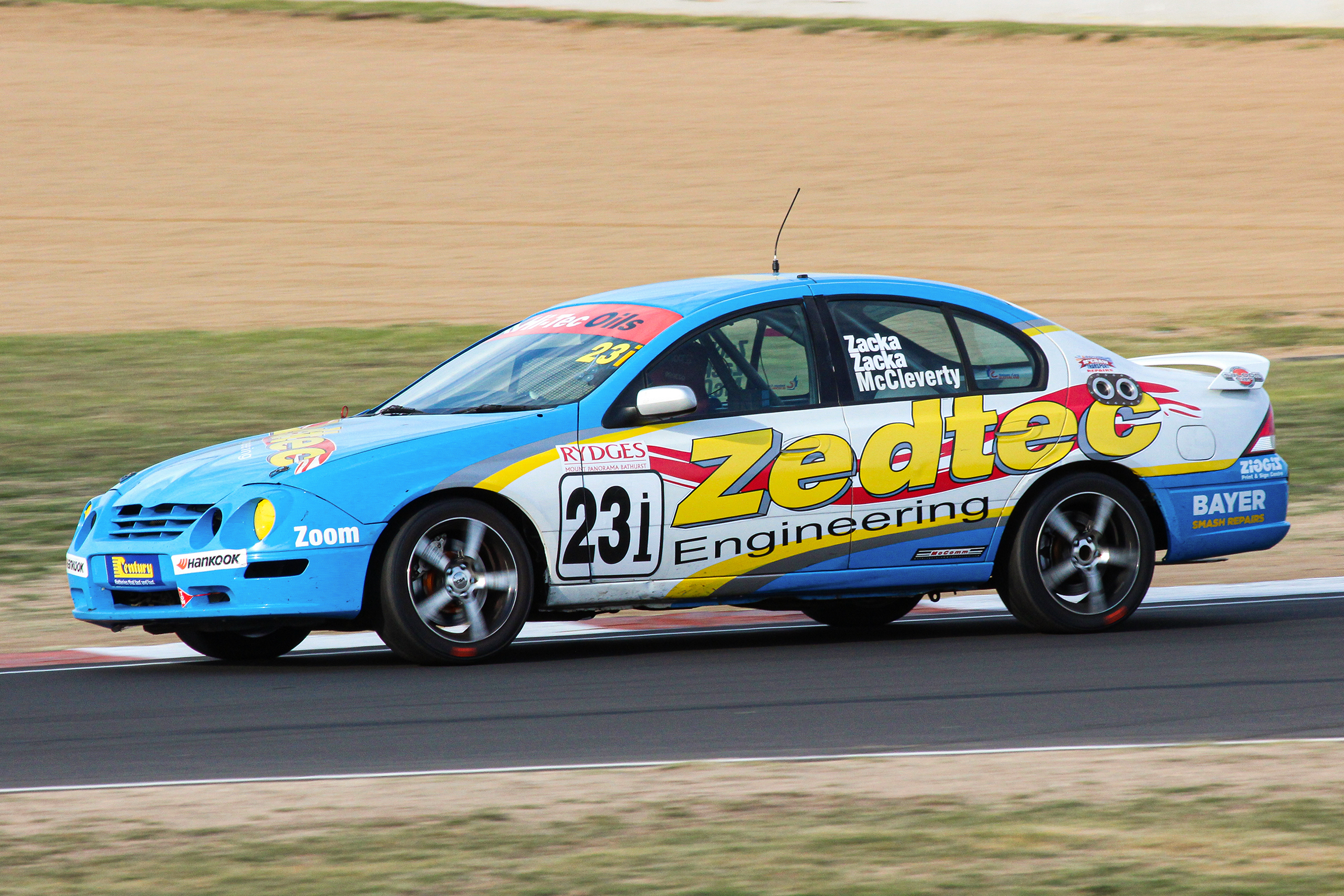
The Class I-winning Ford AU Falcon of John McCleverty, Brad Zacka and Michael Zacka.

Pos.	Class	No.	Drivers	Entrant	Car	Laps
1	**A1**	**62**	**(Australia) Luke Searle (Australia) Paul Morris**	**Roadchill Freight Express**	**BMW M135i Hatch F20**	**113**
2	A1	1	(Australia) Nathan Morcom (Australia) Chaz Mostert	Direct Plasterboard Outlet	Ford Focus RS LZ	113
3	A1	7	(Australia) Jim Pollicina (Australia) Ryan Simpson	Mocomm/Poll Performance	Mitsubishi Lancer Evolution X RS	113
4	A1	80	(Australia) Beric Lynton (Australia) Tim Leahey	Bruce Lynton Prestige Automotive	BMW 1 Series M Coupé E82	113
5	A1	46	(Australia) Andrew Richmond (Australia) Karl Reindler	CXC Global/CGR Performance	Mitsubishi Lancer Evolution X RS	113
6	A1	29	(Australia) Robert Woods (Australia) Ben Porter (Australia) Duvashen Padayachee	Commercial Interior Projects Racing, GWR	Mercedes-Benz A 45 AMG	113
7	A1	56	(Australia) Tony Alford (Australia) Mark Eddy	Donut King	Audi TT RS	112
8	**B1**	**11**	**(Australia) Leigh Burges (Australia) Jack Perkins**	**Direct Plasterboard Outlet**	**BMW 335i E92**	**112**
9	A1	95	(Australia) James Abela (Australia) Cameron Hill	Strathbrook	Subaru WRX STI	112
10	B1	15	(Australia) Ben Kavich (Australia) Michael Kavich (Australia) Kieran Pilkington	Race for a Cure	Subaru Impreza WRX STI	112
11	A1	58	(Australia) Kyle Alford (Australia) Chad Parrish	Donut King	BMW 1 Series M Coupé E82	111
12	**A2**	**53**	**(Australia) Trevor Symonds (Australia) Paul Lane (Australia) Scott Bargwanna**	**Project Dry Hire, Gulf Western Oil, Coast Wide Civil**	**HSV VY GTS**	**111**
13	B1	48	(Australia) Scott Gore (Australia) Patrick Galang (Australia) Keith Bensley	ASAP Marketing	BMW 135i E82	111
14	A1	94	(Australia) Adam Wallis (Australia) Jed Wallis	Warrin Mining	BMW 1 Series M Coupé E82	111
15	A1	66	(Australia) Dimitri Agathos (Australia) Lachlan Gibbons	Fullgas Racing	Subaru WRX STI	111
16	B1	27	(Australia) Brett McFarland (Australia) Nikkolas Hough	B.A.R Constructions	Subaru Impreza WRX STI	111
17	**D**	**3**	**(Australia) Chris Reeves (Australia) Chris Sutton**	**Triple Zero Race Engineering/Sutto's Motorcycles**	**Toyota 86 GTS**	**111**
18	**C**	**40**	**(Australia) Robert Rubis (Australia) Todd Hazelwood**	**Mainpoint Advisory/Manta Restaurant**	**BMW 130i E87**	**111**
19	D	37	(Australia) James Vernon (Australia) Mark Caine	Shockwave Signs Motorsport/Massel	Toyota 86 GTS	111
20	A1	6	(Australia) John O'Dowd (Australia) Stephen Thompson	Mocomm/Poll Performance	Mitsubishi Lancer Evolution X RS	110
21	**I**	**23**	**(Australia) John McCleverty (Australia) Brad Zacka (Singapore) Michael Zacka**	**Zedtec Engineering**	**Ford AU Falcon**	**110**
22	C	35	(Australia) Ric Shaw (United Kingdom) David Cox (Australia) Michael Sloss	Ric Shaw Racing/Synchronised Technology	Mazda RX-8	110
23	I	22	(Australia) Ashley Jarvis (Australia) Dion Jarvis	Lighthouse Electrical	Ford AU Falcon	110
24	A1	12	(Australia) Rod Salmon (Australia) Nathan Antunes	Skwirk Online Education	Mercedes-Benz A 45 AMG	109
25	C	43	(Australia) Nicholas Cox (Australia) Adam Gosling	Cox Motor Sports	BMW 130i E87	109
26	B1	28	(Australia) Peter O'Donnell (Australia) James O'Donnell (Australia) Simon O'Donnell	Spinifex Recruiting	BMW 335i E92	109
27	**B2**	**24**	**(Australia) Brian Walden (Australia) Michael Auld (Australia) Richard Bloomfield**	**Airtag Octane Events/Sydfab/Walden Motorsport**	**Holden VE Commodore SS V Redline**	**108**
28	A1	83	(Australia) Neale Muston (Australia) Peter Paddon	CXC Global/CGR Performance	Mitsubishi Lancer Evolution IX RS	110
29	D	39	(Australia) David Bailey (Australia) Matthew Thewlis	Sparesbox	Toyota 86 GTS	108
30	D	49	(Australia) David Crowe (Australia) Trent Grubel	Corvus International	Toyota 86 GTS	108
31	C	10	(Australia) David Raddatz (Australia) Nicholas Cancian	MX5 Mania	Alfa Romeo Giulietta QV	107
32	A2	51	(Australia) Daniel Flanagan (Australia) Marrick Malouf	Goodyear Phillip/Prime Finance/Fifth Gear Motoring	HSV VY GTS	107
33	C	13	(Australia) Colin Osborne (Australia) Hadrian Morrall	Osborne Motorsport	Renault Mégane RS 265	107
34	B2	76	(Australia) Troy Williams (Hong Kong) Daniel Bilski	TWMotorsport	Holden VE Commodore SS V Redline	107
35	I	71	(Australia) Warren Trewin (Australia) Scott Cameron	Legacy Racing	Holden VT Commodore	106
36	D	98	(Australia) Daniel Williams (Australia) Kirt Metcalf (Australia) Daniel Sugden	Daniel Williams	Toyota Camry	106
37	I	8	(Australia) Bradley Carr (Australia) Paul Jarvis	RY.COM.AU	Ford AU Falcon	105
38	C	17	(Australia) Kyle Aubin (Australia) Blake Aubin	John David Renault	Renault Mégane RS 265	105
39	D	50	(Australia) Trevor Keene (Australia) James Keene (Australia) Dominin Martens	MidWest Multimedia	Mini Cooper S JCW	104
40	D	47	(Australia) David Baker (Australia) Brian Callaghan	Online Hire Pty Ltd	Honda Integra Type R	104
41	D	21	(Australia) Jake Williams (Australia) Steven Williams (Australia) Gerry Burgess	Disc Brakes Australia	Kia Proceed GT	101
42	I	61	(Australia) Scott Stephenson (Australia) Christopher Cotton (Australia) Tyson Harvey	Stephenson Motorsport	Hyundai Excel X3	99
43	A1	77	(Australia) Anthony Soole (Australia) Craig Burgess (Australia) Adam Burgess	Property Investment Store	BMW 1 Series M Coupé E82	99
44	B1	54	(Australia) Adrian Stefan (Australia) Ashley Barnett	BM WEST	BMW 335i E92	98
45	I	88	(Australia) Luke Amdersem (Australia) Chris Donnelly	Property Mastermind	Ford AU Falcon	96
46	A1	65	(Australia) Jacob Andrews (Australia) Mark Griffith	CXC Global/CGR Performance	Mitsubishi Lancer Evolution IX RS	93
47	I	25	(Australia) Coleby Cowham (Australia) Lindsay Kearns	Escape Energy/Juuce/Scotts Rods	Ford AU Falcon	93
48	A2	53	(Australia) Steve Hodges (Singapore) Sean Hudspeth (Australia) Robert Coulthard	Hi-Terc Oils	CSV Mondo GT	87
49	D	86	(Australia) Grant Phillips (United States) Michele Abbate	Pedders/Motorsports Training Australia Racing	Toyota 86 GTS	86
50	D	33	(Australia) Peter Foote (Australia) Will Cauchi	Cox Motorsport	Nissan Pulsar N15	52
DNF	A1	45	(Australia) Garth Walden (New Zealand) Craig Baird	Transtar, GWR	Mercedes-Benz A 45 AMG	105
DNF	A2	4	(Australia) Graeme Muir (Australia) Jamie Hodgson	Gramur Stainless	HSV E Series GTS	86
DNF	A1	18	(Australia) Grant Sherrin (Australia) Iain Sherrin	Sherrin Rentals	BMW M4 F82	85
DNF	D	52	(Australia) Graeme Heath (Australia) Joshua Heath	homegas, RaceAway	Toyota 86 GTS	80
DNF	A2	44	(Australia) Daniel Clift (Australia) Wayne Clift (Australia) Ashley Heffernan	Nolan Finishes	HSV VZ Clubsport R8	78
DNF	B2	69	(Australia) Joe Krinelos (Australia) Tony Virag (Australia) Anthony Loscialpo	SBAC	Holden VF Commodore SS V Redline	58
DNF	D	85	(Australia) Declan Kirkham (Australia) Philip Kirkham (Australia) Aaron Cameron	Vurgel Precision Automotive/Declan Kirkham Racing	Mazda MX-6 GE LS	56
DNF	D	55	(Australia) Michael Hopp (Australia) Peter Sortwell (Australia) Steve Pittman	Hare Motorsport/Declan Kirkham Racing/Inertia Apparel	Eunos 30X	53
DNF	C	31	(Australia) Tyler Everingham (Australia) Bob Hughes	Osborne Motorsport	Renault Mégane RS 265	49
DNF	A1	20	(Australia) David Wall (Australia) John Bowe	EASTS Holiday Parks	Mitsubishi Lancer Evolution IX GSR	37
DNF	A1	68	(Australia) Dylan Thomas (Australia) Tim Slade	CXC Global/CGR Performance	Mitsubishi Lancer Evolution X RS	30
DNF	C	5	(Australia) Doug Westwood (Australia) Carey McMahon	Coast Wide Civil	BMW M3 E36	7
DNF	A1	67	(Australia) Jeremy Gray (Australia) Jason Gomersall	JMG/Iseek/Bilstein	FPV FG GT-F	2
DNF	A1	75	(Australia) Aaron McGill (Australia) Aaron Tebb	Battery World	Mitsubishi Lancer Evolution VIII	1

- Class winners are shown in bold text.
- Race time of winning car: 6:01:28.885
- Pole position: 2:25.487, Grant Sherrin
- Fastest race lap: 2:25.802, Chaz Mostert
