= 2010 Australian Manufacturers' Championship =

National Motor Racing Championship

The 2010 Australian Manufacturers' Championship was a CAMS sanctioned national motor racing championship for car manufacturers. It was the 25th manufacturers title to be awarded by CAMS and the 16th to be contested under the Australian Manufacturers' Championship name. The championship, which was open to closed, four seat, production automobiles, also incorporated the 2010 Australian Production Car Championship for drivers. Mitsubishi Motors won their second consecutive Manufacturers' Championship, while Stuart Kostera, driving a Mitsubishi, won the Production Car Championship.

== Calendar ==
The championship was contested over a six round series.

- Round 1, Amour All Bathurst 12 Hour, Mount Panorama Circuit, Bathurst, New South Wales, 13–14 February
- Round 2, Symmons Plains Raceway, Tasmania, 10–11 April
- Round 3, Phillip Island Grand Prix Circuit, Victoria, 1–2 May
- Round 4, Dial Before You Dig Australian Six Hour, Eastern Creek Raceway, New South Wales, 17–18 July
- Round 5, Morgan Park Raceway, Queensland, 28–29 August
- Round 6, Sandown Raceway, Victoria, 23–24 October

All rounds other than Rounds 1 & 4 were contested over two one-hour races.

== Class Structure ==
Cars competed in the following six classes:

- Class A : High Performance (All Wheel Drive)
- Class B : High Performance (Two Wheel Drive)
- Class C : Performance
- Class D : Production
- Class E : Production
- Class F : Alternative Energy

== Points system ==
Only registered manufacturers were eligible to score points in the Australian Manufacturers' Championship. Each registered manufacturer could nominate up to two cars, irrespective of class, which were the only cars eligible to score points for that manufacturer at that round of the championship.

- In each single race round, points towards the Australian Manufacturers' Championship were awarded on a 120-90-72-61-54-48-42-36-30-24-18-12-6 basis for the first thirteen places in each class. 3 points were awarded for all other finishers.
- In each two race round, points towards the Australian Manufacturers Championship were awarded on a 60-45-36-30-27-24-21-18-15-12-9-6-3 basis for the first thirteen places in each class in each race. 2 points were awarded for all other finishers in each race.

Drivers registered for the Australian Production Car Championship were eligible to score points towards that title regardless of Manufacturer registration.

- Two points were awarded for the driver setting the fastest qualifying lap in each class at each round.
- In each single race round, points towards the Outright and Class titles in the Australian Production Car Championship were awarded on a 120-90-72-61-54-48-42-36-30-24-18-12-6 basis for the first thirteen places in each class. 3 points were awarded for all other finishers.
- In each two race round, points towards the Outright and Class titles in the Australian Production Car Championship were awarded on 60-45-36-30-27-24-21-18-15-12-9-6-3 basis for the first thirteen places in each class in each race. 2 points were awarded for all other finishers in each race.

== Championship results ==
=== Australian Manufacturers' Championship ===
Position	Manufacturer	Car	R1	R2	R3	R4	R5	R6	Total
1	Mitsubishi	Mitsubishi Lancer	-	165	165	210	156	210	906
2	Mazda	Mazda 3 MPS	-	120	99	192	123	-	534
3	Holden	Holden Astra	-	-	-	120	-	-	120
4	Ford	Ford Fiesta XR4	-	-	-	90	-	-	90
5	Renault	Renault Clio 197	-	-	-	-	24	-	24

=== Australian Production Car Championship ===
Position	Driver	No.	Car	Entrant	R1	R2	R3	R4	R5	R6	Total
1	Stuart Kostera	55	Mitsubishi Lancer Evo X	West Surfing Products	-	120	92	120	122	122	576
2	Garry Holt	20	BMW 335i & Holden Astra	Eastern Creek Karts	122	83	92	122	56	32	507
3	Jake Camilleri	36	Mazda 3 MPS	Grand Prix Mazda	92	68	62	122	83	74	501
4	Peter O'Donnell	28	BMW 335i & BMW 130i	GWS Personnel	72	39	63	120	62	30	386
5	Ian Tulloch	11	Mitsubishi Lancer Evo X	Tulloch Transport	-	47	72	90	36	90	335
6	Hadrian Morrall	31	Mazda 3 MPS	Osborne Motorsport	120	54	39	60	30	24	327
7	Allan Shepherd	28 & 27	BMW 130i	GWS Personnel & The Shire Conveyancer	72	42	48	90	-	24	276
8	Richard Gartner	97	Renault Clio 197	Safe-T-Stop	122	44	56	-	24	29	275
9	Trevor Keene	31 & 50	Mazda 3 MPS & Mini Cooper S	Osborne Motorsport & Mid West Multi Media	120	30	-	54	-	15	219
10	Lauren Gray	5	Toyota Corolla	Lauren Gray Motorsport	90	12	30	72	-	-	204
11	Kurt Wimmer	2	Subaru Impreza WRX STi	Wilson Brothers Racing	122	27	18	-	-	-	167
12	John Bowe	28	BMW 335i	GWS Personnel	-	-	-	122	-	-	122
	Warren Luff	55	Mitsubishi Lancer Evo X	West Surfing Products	-	-	-	122	-	-	122
	Justin Matthews	16	Toyota Yaris	Bezcorp Security	-	-	-	122	-	-	122
15	Bob Holden	16	Toyota Yaris	Bezcorp Security	-	-	-	120	-	-	120
	Scott Nicholas	36	Mazda 3 MPS	Grand Prix Mazda	-	-	-	120	-	-	120
	Craig Bradshaw	16	Toyota Yaris	Bezcorp Security	-	-	-	120	-	-	120
	Ryan McLeod	20	Holden Astra	Eastern Creek Karts	-	-	-	120	-	-	120
19	Colin Osborne	13	Mazda 3 MPS	Osborne Motorsport	-	-	-	72	42	-	114
	Matt Hayes	22	Honda Integra S & BMW 130i	Disc Brakes Australia & The Shire Conveyancer	-	-	-	90	-	24	114
21	Greg Symes	93	BMW 130i	Symes Coaches	-	-	-	-	36	57	93
22	Michael Gray	5	Toyota Corolla	Lauren Gray Motorsport	90	-	-	-	-	-	90
	Dean Neville	21	FPV BF GT	Century 21	-	-	-	90	-	-	90
	Garth Duffy	27	BMW 130i	The Shire Conveyancer	-	-	-	90	-	-	90
	Richard Mork	22	Honda Integra S	Disc Brakes Australia	-	-	-	90	-	-	90
	Aaron McGill	75	FPV BF GT	Auto Motion	90	-	-	-	-	-	90
	Matt McGill	75	FPV BF GT	Auto Motion	90	-	-	-	-	-	90
	Chris Delfsma	21	FPV BF GT	Century 21	-	-	-	90	-	-	90
	Steve Jones	11	Mitsubishi Lancer Evo X	Tulloch Transport	-	-	-	90	-	-	90
	Terry Conroy	22	Honda Integra S	Disc Brakes Australia	-	-	-	90	-	-	90
31	Mark Brame	17	Mitsubishi Lancer Evo VIII	Disc Brakes Australia	-	-	-	72	-	-	72
	Tony Alford	25	HSV VYII GTS	Donut King Excen Corp Centres	-	-	-	72	-	-	72
	Barrie Nesbitt	25	HSV VYII GTS	Donut King Excen Corp Centres	-	-	-	72	-	-	72
	Rick Bates	13	Mazda 3 MPS	Osborne Motorsport	-	-	-	72	-	-	72
	Peter Conroy	17	Mitsubishi Lancer Evo VIII	Disc Brakes Australia	-	-	-	72	-	-	72
	Jake Williams	5	Toyota Corolla	Lauren Gray Motorsport	-	-	-	72	-	-	72
37	Keen Booker	27 & 72	BMW 130i & Toyota Celica	Allan Shepherd & Fergusons Toyota	-	42	-	-	-	21	63
38	Matt Lehmann	71	Ford Fiesta XR4	Inertia Apparel	-	-	-	60	-	-	60
	Glyn Crimp	10	Mitsubishi Lancer Evo X	West Surfing Products Australia	-	-	-	60	-	-	60
	Matthew Cherry	10	Mitsubishi Lancer Evo X	West Surfing Products Australia	-	-	-	60	-	-	60
	Graham Moore	31	Mazda 3 MPS	Osborne Motorsport	-	-	-	60	-	-	60
	Phil Kirkham	71	Ford Fiesta XR4	Inertia Apparel	-	-	-	60	-	-	60
	Declan Kirkham	71	Ford Fiesta XR4	Inertia Apparel	-	-	-	60	-	-	60
44	Ryan Dane	50	Mini Cooper S	Advance Document Syst	-	-	-	54	-	-	54
	Gavin Bullas	77	Subaru Impreza WRX STi	Johnson Window Films	-	-	-	54	-	-	54
	Steve Cramp	50	Mini Cooper S	Advance Document Syst	-	-	-	54	-	-	54
	Barton Mawer	77	Subaru Impreza WRX STi	Johnson Window Films	-	-	-	54	-	-	54
48	Cam Wilson	2	Subaru Impreza WRX STi	Wilson Brothers Racing	-	-	-	-	48	-	48
	Lee Castle	2	Subaru Impreza WRX STi	Wilson Brothers Racing	-	-	-	-	48	-	48
	Gerry Murphy	4	Mitsubishi Lancer Evo VIII RS	Tempest Air Mocomm	-	-	-	48	-	-	48
	Darren Best	76	Mitsubishi Lancer	Best Lifestyle Units	-	-	-	-	-	48	48
	Anthony Loscialpo	4	Mitsubishi Lancer Evo VIII RS	Tempest Air Mocomm	-	-	-	48	-	-	48
	Jim Pollicina	4	Mitsubishi Lancer Evo VIII RS	Tempest Air Mocomm	-	-	-	48	-	-	48
54	Tony Quinn	29	Mitsubishi Lancer Evo IX	VIP Petfoods	-	-	-	-	45	-	45
55	Trevor Symonds	38	Mitsubishi Lancer Evo IX	Easts Holiday Parks	-	-	-	42	-	-	42
	David Wall	38	Mitsubishi Lancer Evo IX	Easts Holiday Parks	-	-	-	42	-	-	42
	Des Wall	38	Mitsubishi Lancer Evo IX	Easts Holiday Parks	-	-	-	42	-	-	42
58	Ric Shaw	26	BMW 130i	Peter O'Donnell	-	-	-	-	-	36	36
	Andrew Bollam	26	BMW 130i	Peter O'Donnell	-	-	-	-	-	36	36
60	Steve Briffa	8	HSV VE Clubsport	Briffa Smash Repairs	-	-	-	-	-	30	30
61	Carl Schembri	97	Renault Clio 197	Safe-T-Stop	-	-	-	-	-	27	27
62	Martin Bailey	72	Toyota Celica	Fergusons Toyota	-	-	-	-	-	21	21
63	Belinda Halliwell	67	Holden Astra CDTi	Nemo Racing	-	-	-	-	20	-	20
	Brook Leech	67	Holden Astra CDTi	Nemo Racing	-	-	-	-	20	-	20
	Class A: High Performance (All Wheel Drive)										
Position	Driver	No.	Car	Entrant	R1	R2	R3	R4	R5	R6	Total
1	Stuart Kostera	55	Mitsubishi Lancer Evo X	West Surfing Products	-	120	107	120	122	122	591
2	Ian Tulloch	11	Mitsubishi Lancer Evo X	Tulloch Transport	-	47	96	90	45	90	368
3	Kurt Wimmer	2	Subaru Impreza WRX STi	Wilson Brothers Racing	122	36	45	-	-	-	203
4	Warren Luff	55	Mitsubishi Lancer Evo X	West Surfing Products	-	-	-	122	-	-	122
5	Steve Jones	11	Mitsubishi Lancer Evo X	Tulloch Transport	-	-	-	90	-	-	90
6	Cam Wilson	2	Subaru Impreza WRX STi	Wilson Brothers Racing	-	-	-	-	72	-	72
	Lee Castle	2	Subaru Impreza WRX STi	Wilson Brothers Racing	-	-	-	-	72	-	72
	Mark Brame	17	Mitsubishi Lancer Evo VIII	Disc Brakes Australia	-	-	-	72	-	-	72
	Peter Conroy	17	Mitsubishi Lancer Evo VIII	Disc Brakes Australia	-	-	-	72	-	-	72
	Darren Best	76	Mitsubishi Lancer	Best Lifestyle Units	-	-	-	-	-	72	72
11	Matt Cherry	10	Mitsubishi Lancer Evo X	West Surfing Products Australia	-	-	-	60	-	-	60
	Glyn Crimp	10	Mitsubishi Lancer Evo X	West Surfing Products Australia	-	-	-	60	-	-	60
13	Gavin Bullas	77	Subaru Impreza WRX STi	Johnson Window Films	-	-	-	54	-	-	54
	Barton Mawer	77	Subaru Impreza WRX STi	Johnson Window Films	-	-	-	54	-	-	54
15	Des Wall	38	Mitsubishi Lancer Evo IX	Easts Holiday Parks	-	-	-	48	-	-	48
	Trevor Symonds	38	Mitsubishi Lancer Evo IX	Easts Holiday Parks	-	-	-	48	-	-	48
	David Wall	38	Mitsubishi Lancer Evo IX	Easts Holiday Parks	-	-	-	48	-	-	48
18	Tony Quinn	29	Mitsubishi Lancer Evo IX	VIP Petfoods	-	-	-	-	45	-	45
	Class B: High Performance (Two Wheel Drive)										
Position	Driver	No.	Car	Entrant	R1	R2	R3	R4	R5	R6	Total
1	Garry Holt	20	BMW 335i	Eastern Creek Karts	122	122	122	-	-	62	428
2	Peter O'Donnell	28	BMW 335i	GWS Personnel	-	-	-	120	122	60	302
3	John Bowe	20	BMW 335i	GWS Personnel	-	-	-	122	-	-	122
4	Steve Briffa	8	HSV VE Clubsport	Briffa Smash Repairs	-	-	-	-	-	105	105
5	Dean Neville	21	FPV BF GT	Century 21	-	-	-	90	-	-	90
	Aaron McGill	75	FPV BF GT	Auto Motion	90	-	-	-	-	-	90
	Chris Delfsma	21	FPV BF GT	Century 21	-	-	-	90	-	-	90
	Matt McGill	75	FPV BF GT	Auto Motion	90	-	-	-	-	-	90
9	Barrie Nesbitt	25	HSV VYII GTS	Donut King Excen Corp Centres	-	-	-	72	-	-	72
	Tony Alford	25	HSV VYII GTS	Donut King Excen Corp Centres	-	-	-	72	-	-	72
	Class C : Performance										
Position	Driver	No.	Car	Entrant	R1	R2	R3	R4	R5	R6	Total
1	Jake Camilleri	36	Mazda 3 MPS	Grand Prix Mazda	92	122	98	122	122	122	678
2	Hadrian Morrall	31	Mazda 3 MPS	Osborne Motorsport	120	90	60	60	60	36	426
3	Allan Shephard	28 & 27	BMW 130i	GWS Personnel & The Shire Conveyancer	72	66	81	90	-	36	345
4	Peter O'Donnell	28	BMW 335i & BMW 130i	GWS Personnel	72	66	105	-	-	-	243
5	Greg Symes	93	BMW 130i	Symes Coaches	-	-	-	-	72	90	162
6	Colin Osborne	13	Mazda 3 MPS	Osborne Motorsport	-	-	-	72	90	-	162
7	Scott Nicholas	36	Mazda 3 MPS	Grand Prix Mazda	-	-	-	120	-	-	120
	Trevor Keene	31	Mazda 3 MPS	Osborne Motorsport	120	-	-	-	-	-	120
9	Garth Duffy	27	BMW 130i	The Shire Conveyancer	-	-	-	90	-	-	90
10	Rick Bates	13	Mazda 3 MPS	Osborne Motorsport	-	-	-	72	-	-	72
11	Kean Booker	27	BMW 130i	Allan Shephard	-	66	-	-	-	-	66
12	Andrew Bollam	26	BMW 130i	Peter O'Donnell	-	-	-	-	-	60	60
	Ric Shaw	26	BMW 130i	Peter O'Donnell	-	-	-	-	-	60	60
	Graham Moore	31	Mazda 3 MPS	Osborne Motorsport	-	-	-	60	-	-	60
15	Matt Hayes	22	BMW 130i	The Shire Conveyancer	-	-	-	-	-	36	36
	Nick Kjaer	28	BMW 130i	GWS Personnel	-	-	-	-	36	-	36
	Class D : Production										
Position	Driver	No.	Car	Entrant	R1	R2	R3	R4	R5	R6	Total
1	Richard Gartner	97	Renault Clio 197	Safe-T-Stop	122	122	122	-	90	98	554
2	Lauren Gray	5	Toyota Corolla	Lauren Gray Motorsport	90	45	90	72	-	-	297
3	Garry Holt	20	Holden Astra	Eastern Creek Karts	-	-	-	122	122	-	244
4	Trevor Keene	50	Mini Cooper S	Mid West Multi Media	-	81	-	54	-	60	195
5	Ryan McLeod	20	Holden Astra	Eastern Creek Karts	-	-	-	120	-	-	120
6	Carl Schembri	97	Renault Clio 197	Safe-T-Stop	-	-	-	-	-	96	96
7	Kean Booker	72	Toyota Celica	Fergusons Toyota	-	-	-	-	-	90	90
	Martin Bailey	72	Toyota Celica	Fergusons Toyota	-	-	-	-	-	90	90
	Richard Mork	22	Honda Integra S	Disc Brakes Australia	-	-	-	90	-	-	90
	Terry Conroy	22	Honda Integra S	Disc Brakes Australia	-	-	-	90	-	-	90
	Michael Gray	5	Toyota Corolla	Lauren Gray Motorsport	90	-	-	-	-	-	90
	Matt Hayes	22	Honda Integra S	Disc Brakes Australia	-	-	-	90	-	-	90
13	Jake Williams	5	Toyota Corolla	Lauren Gray Motorsport	-	-	-	72	-	-	72
14	Phil Kirkham	71	Ford Fiesta XR4	Inertia Apparel	-	-	-	60	-	-	60
	Matt Lehmann	71	Ford Fiesta XR4	Inertia Apparel	-	-	-	60	-	-	60
	Declan Kirkham	71	Ford Fiesta XR4	Inertia Apparel	-	-	-	60	-	-	60
17	Steve Cramp	50	Mini Cooper S	Advance Document Syst	-	-	-	54	-	-	54
	Ryan Dane	50	Mini Cooper S	Advance Document Syst	-	-	-	54	-	-	54
	Class E : Production										
Position	Driver	No.	Car	Entrant	R1	R2	R3	R4	R5	R6	Total
1	Justin Matthews	16	Toyota Yaris	Bezcorp Security	-	-	-	122	-	-	122
2	Bob Holden	16	Toyota Yaris	Bezcorp Security	-	-	-	120	-	-	120
	Craig Bradshaw	16	Toyota Yaris	Bezcorp Security	-	-	-	120	-	-	120
	Class F : Alternative Energy										
Position	Driver	No.	Car	Entrant	R1	R2	R3	R4	R5	R6	Total
1	Belinda Halliwell	67	Holden Astra CDTi	Nemo Racing	-	-	-	-	122	-	122
	Brook Leech	67	Holden Astra CDTi	Nemo Racing	-	-	-	-	122	-	122

== Race results for top ten drivers ==
Pos.	Driver	No.	Car	Class	Team	R1	R2		R3		R4	R5		R6		Total
1	Stuart Kostera	55	Mitsubishi Lancer Evo X	A	Team Mitsubishi Ralliart	Ret	1st	1st	1st	5th	1st	1st	1st	1st	1st	576
2	Garry Holt	20	BMW 335i Holden Astra	B C	Eastern Creek Karts	1st	2nd	3rd	2nd	3rd	9th	5th	5th	Ret	4th	507
3	Jake Camilleri	36	Mazda 3 MPS	C	Grand Prix Mazda	10th	3rd	4th	6th	4th	10th	3rd	2nd	3rd	3rd	501
4	Peter O'Donnell	28	BMW 130i BMW 335i	C B	GWS Personnel	14th	8th	7th	3rd	6th	5th	4th	4th	Ret	4th	386
5	Ian Tulloch	11	Mitsubishi Lancer Evo X	A	Team Mitsubishi Ralliart	Ret	Ret	2nd	11th	1st	2nd	Ret	3rd	2nd	2nd	335
6	Hadrian Morrall	31	Mazda 3 MPS	C	Osborne Motorsport	8th	4th	6th	8th	10th	20th	9th	9th	Ret	6th	327
7	Allan Shephard	27	BMW 130i	C		14th	6th	8th	5th	9th	11th			6th	Ret	276
8	Richard Gartner	97	Renault Clio	D		15th	5th	9th	4th	7th	Ret	10th	10th	11th	8th	275
9	Trevor Keene	31; 50	Mazda 3 MPS; Mini Cooper S	C D	Osborne Motorsport.	8th	7th	11th			16th			9th	Ret	219
10	Lauren Gray	5	Toyota Corolla Sportivo	D	Lauren Gray Motorsport	19th	Ret	10th	10th	12th	14th					204
