= 2010 Dial Before You Dig Australian Six Hour =

Layout of the Eastern Creek Raceway

The 2010 Dial Before You Dig Australian Six Hour was an endurance motor race for production cars. It was staged on 18 July 2010 at the Eastern Creek International Raceway in New South Wales, Australia and was Round 4 of both the 2010 Australian Manufacturers' Championship and the 2010 Australian Production Car Championship. The race was won by Stuart Kostera and Warren Luff at the wheel of a Mitsubishi Lancer Evo X, leading a 1–2–3–4 for the manufacturer. Kostera and Luff won by two laps ahead of Ian Tulloch and Steve Jones, with Peter Conroy and Mark Brame finishing a further lap down in third place.

== Classes ==
As a round of the 2010 Australian Manufacturers' Championship, the race featured six classes:

- Class A : High Performance (All Wheel Drive)
- Class B : High Performance (Two Wheel Drive)
- Class C : Performance
- Class D : Production
- Class E : Production
- Class F : Alternative Energy

There were no entries received for Class F.

== Results ==
Position	Drivers	No.	Vehicle	Competitor / Team	Class	Laps
1	Stuart Kostera, Warren Luff	55	Mitsubishi Lancer Evo X	West Surfing Products	A	195
2	Ian Tulloch, Steve Jones	11	Mitsubishi Lancer Evo X	Wescone Distribution / Tulloch Transport	A	193
3	Peter Conroy, Mark Brame	17	Mitsubishi Lancer Evo X	Disc Brakes Australia	A	192
4	Glyn Crimp, Mathew Cherry	10	Mitsubishi Lancer Evo X	West Surfing Products Australia	A	190
5	Peter O'Donnell, John Bowe	28	BMW 335i	GWS Personnel	B	190
6	Barton Mawer, Gavin Bullas	77	Subaru Impreza WRX STi	Johnson Window Films	A	190
7	Jim Pollicina, Gerry Murphy	4	Mitsubishi Lancer Evo 8 RS	Tempest Air Mocomm	A	189
8	David Wall, Des Wall	38	Mitsubishi Lancer Evo 9	Easts Holiday Parks	A	187
9	Ryan McLeod, Garry Holt	20	Holden Astra	Racer Industries / Eastern Creek Karts	D	186
10	Jake Camilleri, Scott Nicholas	36	Mazda 3 MPS	Grand Prix Maxda	C	184
11	Allan Shephard, Garth Duffy	27	BMW 130i	Shire Conveyancer	C	184
12	Colin Osborne, Rick Bates	13	Mazda 3 MPS	Osborne Motorsport	C	181
13	Terry Conroy, Richard Mork, M Hayes	22	Honda Integra S	Disc Brakes Australia	D	179
14	Lauren Gray, Jake Williams	5	Toyota Corolla	Lauren Gray Motorsport	D	177
15	Phil Kirkham, Declan Kirkham, Matt Lehmann	71	Ford Fiesta XR4	Inertia Apparel	D	177
16	Trevor Keene, Ryan Dane, Steve Cramp	50	Mini Cooper S	Advance Document Syst	D	173
17	Chris Defsma, Dean Neville	21	FPV BF GT	Century 21	B	173
18	Juston Matthews, Bob Holden, Craig Bradshaw	16	Toyota Yaris	Bezcorp Security	E	168
19	Tony Alford, Barrie Nesbitt	25	HSV VYII GTS	Donut King / Excen Corp Centres	B	167
20	Hadrian Morall, Graham Moore	31	Mazda 3 MPS	Osborne Motorsport	C	140
DNF	Richard Gartner, Francois Jouy, Carl Schembri	97	Renault Clio 197	Safe-T-Stop	D	175
DNF	Steve Briffa, Cgristian D'Agostin	8	HSV VE Clubsport	Holden Motorsport	B	164
DNF	Tony Quinn, Klark Quinn	29	Mitsubishi Lancer Evo 9	VIP Petfoods	A	96
DNF	Ian Thorp, Aaron Thorp, Ray Curry	33	Renault Clio 197	R-Sport	D	96
DNF	Rod Barrett, (Geoff Morgan), (Peter Boylan)	6	FPV FG F6	Boylan Traffic Solutions	B	7

Note: Driver's name within brackets indicates driver did not actually drive the car in the race.
