= 2010 Bathurst 12 Hour =

Endurance motor racing event

2010 Armor All Bathurst 12 Hour

Seasons
- ← 2009 2011 →

Layout of the Mount Panorama Circuit

The 2010 Armor All Bathurst 12 Hour was an endurance race for Group 3E Series Production Cars and other invited vehicles. The event, which was staged at the Mount Panorama Circuit, Bathurst, New South Wales, Australia on 14 February 2010, was the eighth running of the Bathurst 12 Hour, and the fourth since the race was revived in 2007. It was also Round 1 of the 2010 Australian Manufacturers' Championship.

== Class structure ==
Cars competed in the following classes:

- Class A – High Performance All Wheel Drive
- Class B – High Performance Rear Wheel Drive
- Class C – Performance
- Class D – Production (Sport)
- Class E – Production (Small)
- Class F – Alternative Energy
- Class G – V8 Utes
- Class H – Mini Challenge
- Class I – Invitational

There were no starters in Class H.

== Results ==
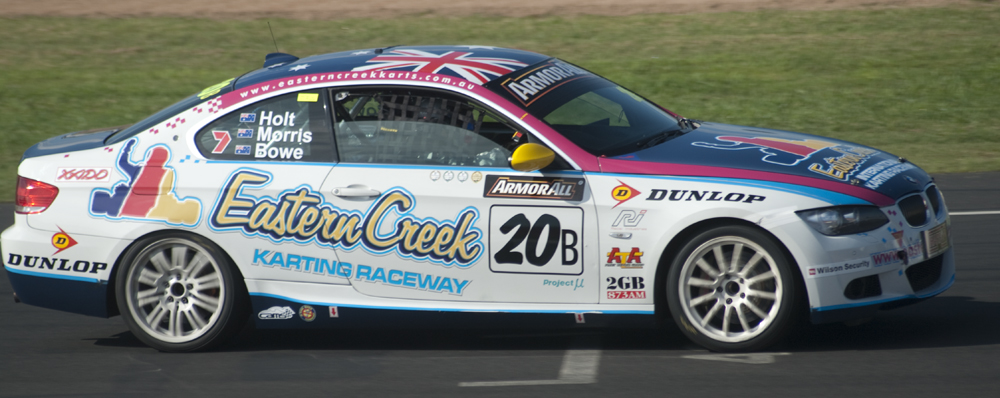
The winning BMW 335i of Garry Holt, Paul Morris and John Bowe

Pos	Class	Car No.	Team	Drivers	Car	Laps	Grid Pos
Pos	Class	Car No.	Team	Drivers	Engine	Laps	Grid Pos
1	B	20	Eastern Creek International Karting Raceway	(Australia) Garry Holt (Australia) Paul Morris (Australia) John Bowe	BMW 335i	202	7
1	B	20	Eastern Creek International Karting Raceway	(Australia) Garry Holt (Australia) Paul Morris (Australia) John Bowe	3.0 L BMW N54 twin-turbo I6	202	7
2	A	35	Pro-Duct Motorsport	(Australia) Neil Crompton (Australia) Glenn Seton (Australia) Mark King	Mitsubishi Lancer RS Evo X	201	2
2	A	35	Pro-Duct Motorsport	(Australia) Neil Crompton (Australia) Glenn Seton (Australia) Mark King	2.0 L Mitsubishi 4B11T I4	201	2
3	B	85	Menray Race Engineering	(Australia) Nathan Pretty (Australia) Cameron McConville (Australia) Andrew Jones	HSV Clubsport R8 Tourer	201	12
3	B	85	Menray Race Engineering	(Australia) Nathan Pretty (Australia) Cameron McConville (Australia) Andrew Jones	6.2 L GM LS3 V8	201	12
4	A	7	Peter Conroy Motorsport	(Australia) Peter Conroy (Australia) Anthony Robson (Australia) Mark Brame	Mitsubishi Lancer RS Evo X	197	16
4	A	7	Peter Conroy Motorsport	(Australia) Peter Conroy (Australia) Anthony Robson (Australia) Mark Brame	2.0 L Mitsubishi 4B11T I4	197	16
5	B	10	Robinson Racing Developments	(Australia) Ken Douglas (Australia) James Moffat (Australia) Ray Hislop	FPV FG F6	196	14
5	B	10	Robinson Racing Developments	(Australia) Ken Douglas (Australia) James Moffat (Australia) Ray Hislop	4.0 L Ford Barra 310T I6	196	14
6	A	4	Greg Murphy Racing	(Australia) Jim Pollicina (Australia) John O'Dowd (Australia) Simon Middleton	Mitsubishi Lancer RS Evo VIII	195	20
6	A	4	Greg Murphy Racing	(Australia) Jim Pollicina (Australia) John O'Dowd (Australia) Simon Middleton	2.0 L Mitsubishi 4G63T I4	195	20
7	A	2	Wilson Brothers Racing	(Australia) Lee Castle (Australia) Kurt Wimmer (Australia) David Wood	Subaru Impreza WRX	195	19
7	A	2	Wilson Brothers Racing	(Australia) Lee Castle (Australia) Kurt Wimmer (Australia) David Wood	2.5 L Subaru H4	195	19
8	C	31	Osborne Motorsport	(Australia) Trevor Keene (Australia) Hadrian Morrall	Mazda 3 MPS	195	26
8	C	31	Osborne Motorsport	(Australia) Trevor Keene (Australia) Hadrian Morrall	2.3 L Mazda MZR L3-VDT I4	195	26
9	A	96	Supabarn Supermarkets	(Australia) James Koundouris (Australia) Theo Koundouris (Australia) Steve Owen	Mitsubishi Lancer RS Evo IX	194	1
9	A	96	Supabarn Supermarkets	(Australia) James Koundouris (Australia) Theo Koundouris (Australia) Steve Owen	2.0 L Mitsubishi 4G63T I4	194	1
10	C	36	Grand Prix Mazda	(Australia) Jake Camilleri (Australia) Scott Nicholas	Mazda 3 MPS	192	21
10	C	36	Grand Prix Mazda	(Australia) Jake Camilleri (Australia) Scott Nicholas	2.3 L Mazda MZR L3-VDT I4	192	21
11	D	50	Racer Industries	(Australia) Gerard McLeod (Australia) Peter McLeod (Australia) Ryan McLeod	Holden Astra SR-I Turbo	192	25
11	D	50	Racer Industries	(Australia) Gerard McLeod (Australia) Peter McLeod (Australia) Ryan McLeod	2.0 L Ecotec I4	192	25
12	C	68	Motorsport Services	(New Zealand) Scott O’Donnell (New Zealand) Bob Grove (New Zealand) Alan Dippie (New Zealand) Aaron Harris	BMW 130i	191	33
12	C	68	Motorsport Services	(New Zealand) Scott O’Donnell (New Zealand) Bob Grove (New Zealand) Alan Dippie (New Zealand) Aaron Harris	3.0 L BMW N55 I6	191	33
13	D	21	Peter Conroy Motorsport	(Australia) Terry Conroy (Australia) Gerry Burgess (Australia) Leanne Tander	Honda Integra Type S	188	31
13	D	21	Peter Conroy Motorsport	(Australia) Terry Conroy (Australia) Gerry Burgess (Australia) Leanne Tander	2.0 L Honda K20A3 I4	188	31
14	C	28	On Track Motorsport	(Australia) Peter O’Donnell (Australia) Christian D'Agostin (Australia) Allan Shephard (Australia) Steve Briffa	BMW 130i	187	24
14	C	28	On Track Motorsport	(Australia) Peter O’Donnell (Australia) Christian D'Agostin (Australia) Allan Shephard (Australia) Steve Briffa	3.0 L BMW N55 I6	187	24
15	D	97	Safe-T-Stop	(Australia) Richard Gartner (Australia) Mark Eddy (Italy) Ross Zampatti	Renault Clio 197	185	38
15	D	97	Safe-T-Stop	(Australia) Richard Gartner (Australia) Mark Eddy (Italy) Ross Zampatti	2.0 L Renault F4R I4	185	38
16	G	60	Grove Fruit Juice	(Australia) Greg Willis (Australia) Jason Gomersall (Australia) Matthew MacKelden	Ford BF Falcon XR8 Ute	185	32
16	G	60	Grove Fruit Juice	(Australia) Greg Willis (Australia) Jason Gomersall (Australia) Matthew MacKelden	5.4 L Ford Boss 260 V8	185	32
17	C	27	On Track Motorsport	(Australia) Geoff Fontaine (Australia) Bruce Thomlinson (Australia) David Ryan	BMW 130i	183	29
17	C	27	On Track Motorsport	(Australia) Geoff Fontaine (Australia) Bruce Thomlinson (Australia) David Ryan	3.0 L BMW N55 I6	183	29
18	E	88	Team Bathurst	(Australia) Matthew Windsor (Australia) Paul Newman (Australia) Steven Shiels	Subaru Impreza 2.5	183	39
18	E	88	Team Bathurst	(Australia) Matthew Windsor (Australia) Paul Newman (Australia) Steven Shiels	2.5L Subaru EJ25 H4	183	39
19	D	5	Lauren Gray Motorsport	(Australia) Lauren Gray (Australia) Michael Gray (Australia) Tony Head	Toyota Corolla Sportivo	181	37
19	D	5	Lauren Gray Motorsport	(Australia) Lauren Gray (Australia) Michael Gray (Australia) Tony Head	1.8 L Toyota 2ZZ-GE I4	181	37
20	C	94	Aporchapart / Kitome	(Australia) Richard Howe (Australia) Dennis O’Keefe (Australia) Dean Neville	Ford BF Falcon XR8	178	30
20	C	94	Aporchapart / Kitome	(Australia) Richard Howe (Australia) Dennis O’Keefe (Australia) Dean Neville	5.4 L Ford Boss 315 V8	178	30
21	F	76	Thomson Alfa	(Australia) Kean Booker (Australia) Rocco Rinaldo (Australia) David Stone	Alfa Romeo 159	176	36
21	F	76	Thomson Alfa	(Australia) Kean Booker (Australia) Rocco Rinaldo (Australia) David Stone	2.4 L Alfa Romeo JTDm I5	176	36
22	E	16	Bezcorp Security	(Australia) Justin Matthews (Australia) Bob Holden (Australia) Craig Bradshaw	Toyota Yaris	169	40
22	E	16	Bezcorp Security	(Australia) Justin Matthews (Australia) Bob Holden (Australia) Craig Bradshaw	1.5 L Toyota 1NZ-FE I4	169	40
23	G	99	Sieders Racing Team	(Australia) Ben Dunn (Australia) Andrew Fisher (Australia) Brad Patton	Ford FG Falcon XR8 Ute	156	22
23	G	99	Sieders Racing Team	(Australia) Ben Dunn (Australia) Andrew Fisher (Australia) Brad Patton	5.4 L Ford Boss 290 V8	156	22
24	A	66	Jim Hunter Motorsport	(Australia) Warren Bossie (Australia) Glen Featherstone (Australia) Mark Tutton	Subaru Impreza WRX	155	32
24	A	66	Jim Hunter Motorsport	(Australia) Warren Bossie (Australia) Glen Featherstone (Australia) Mark Tutton	2.5 L Subaru H4	155	32
25	B	75	McGill Motorsport	(Australia) Aaron McGill (Australia) Matt McGill (Australia) Mark Williamson	FPV BF GT	128	27
25	B	75	McGill Motorsport	(Australia) Aaron McGill (Australia) Matt McGill (Australia) Mark Williamson	5.4 L Ford Boss 290 V8	128	27
26	I	71	Action Racing	(Australia) Marcus Zukanovic (Denmark) Allan Simonsen (Australia) Jason Bright	Ford Mustang Shelby GT500	121	10
26	I	71	Action Racing	(Australia) Marcus Zukanovic (Denmark) Allan Simonsen (Australia) Jason Bright	5.4 L Ford Modular V8	121	10
DNF	B	3	Greg Murphy Racing	(New Zealand) Rob Wilson (Italy) Maurizio Fabris (Australia) Geoff Emery	HSV GTS	176	15
DNF	B	3	Greg Murphy Racing	(New Zealand) Rob Wilson (Italy) Maurizio Fabris (Australia) Geoff Emery	5.7 L GM LS1 V8	176	15
DNF	A	1	TMR Australia	(Australia) Rod Salmon (Australia) Damien White (New Zealand) Ian Tulloch	Mitsubishi Lancer RS Evo X	155	4
DNF	A	1	TMR Australia	(Australia) Rod Salmon (Australia) Damien White (New Zealand) Ian Tulloch	2.0 L Mitsubishi 4B11T I4	155	4
DNF	B	67	JMG Maintenance/Century 21	(Australia) Jeremy Gray (Australia) Chris Delfsma (Australia) Andrew Miedecke	FPV FG F6	154	23
DNF	B	67	JMG Maintenance/Century 21	(Australia) Jeremy Gray (Australia) Chris Delfsma (Australia) Andrew Miedecke	4.0 L Ford Barra 310T I6	154	23
DNF	A	62	GLOBE / Westrac	(Australia) Peter Hill (Australia) Eric Bana (Australia) Tim Leahey	Mitsubishi Lancer RS Evo X	129	8
DNF	A	62	GLOBE / Westrac	(Australia) Peter Hill (Australia) Eric Bana (Australia) Tim Leahey	2.0 L Mitsubishi 4B11T I4	129	8
DNF	A	44	Jim Hunter Motorsport	(Australia) Jim Hunter (Australia) Dean Herridge (Australia) Barton Mawer	Subaru Impreza WRX STi	129	13
DNF	A	44	Jim Hunter Motorsport	(Australia) Jim Hunter (Australia) Dean Herridge (Australia) Barton Mawer	2.5 L Subaru H4	129	13
DNF	G	47	Hi-Tech Motorsport	(Australia) Grant Johnson (Australia) Nathan Callaghan (Australia) Allan Letcher	Holden VE SS Ute	118	18
DNF	G	47	Hi-Tech Motorsport	(Australia) Grant Johnson (Australia) Nathan Callaghan (Australia) Allan Letcher	5.7 L GM LS2 V8	118	18
DNF	A	55	West Surfing Products	(Australia) Glyn Crimp (Australia) Warren Luff (Australia) Stuart Kostera	Mitsubishi Lancer RS Evo X	107	6
DNF	A	55	West Surfing Products	(Australia) Glyn Crimp (Australia) Warren Luff (Australia) Stuart Kostera	2.0 L Mitsubishi 4B11T I4	107	6
DNF	D	14	Peter Conroy Motorsport	(Australia) Carl Schembri (Australia) Scott Sullivan (Australia) Ed Singleton	Honda Integra Type S	84	35
DNF	D	14	Peter Conroy Motorsport	(Australia) Carl Schembri (Australia) Scott Sullivan (Australia) Ed Singleton	2.0 L Honda K20A3 I4	84	35
DNF	A	33	Pro-Duct Motorsport	(Australia) Bob Pearson (Australia) Steve Glenney (Australia) Jason Bargwanna	Mitsubishi Lancer RS Evo X	83	3
DNF	A	33	Pro-Duct Motorsport	(Australia) Bob Pearson (Australia) Steve Glenney (Australia) Jason Bargwanna	2.0 L Mitsubishi 4B11T I4	83	3
DNF	C	24	Walden Motorsport	(Australia) Garth Walden (Australia) Brian Walden (Australia) Michael Auld	Holden VE Commodore SS	68	EXC
DNF	C	24	Walden Motorsport	(Australia) Garth Walden (Australia) Brian Walden (Australia) Michael Auld	6.0 L GM L77 V8	68	EXC
DNF	I	63	Queensland House and Land.com	(Australia) Rob Thomson (Australia) Tim Poulton (Australia) Richard Shillington	Lotus Exige	55	28
DNF	I	63	Queensland House and Land.com	(Australia) Rob Thomson (Australia) Tim Poulton (Australia) Richard Shillington	1.8 L Supercharged Toyota ZZ I4	55	28
DNF	B	25	Donut King Racing	(Australia) Tony Alford (Australia) Barrie Nesbitt (United Kingdom) Ian Heward (Australia) Steve Cramp	HSV VY Series II GTS	45	17
DNF	B	25	Donut King Racing	(Australia) Tony Alford (Australia) Barrie Nesbitt (United Kingdom) Ian Heward (Australia) Steve Cramp	5.7 L GM LS1 V8	45	17
DNF	C	13	Osborne Motorsport	(Australia) Colin Osborne (Australia) Rick Bates	Mazda 3 MPS	15	DNQ
DNF	C	13	Osborne Motorsport	(Australia) Colin Osborne (Australia) Rick Bates	2.3 L Mazda MZR L3-VDT I4	15	DNQ
DNF	A	29	VIP Petfoods	(United Kingdom) Tony Quinn (Australia) Klark Quinn (Australia) Max Twigg	Mitsubishi Lancer RS Evo IX	15	5
DNF	A	29	VIP Petfoods	(United Kingdom) Tony Quinn (Australia) Klark Quinn (Australia) Max Twigg	2.0 L Mitsubishi 4G63T I4	15	5
DNF	B	11	Rondo Building Services	(Australia) Barry Morcom (Australia) Paul Stubber (Australia) Daniel Erickson	BMW 335i	4	11
DNF	B	11	Rondo Building Services	(Australia) Barry Morcom (Australia) Paul Stubber (Australia) Daniel Erickson	3.0 L BMW N54 twin-turbo I6	4	11
EXC	A	38	Alan East Motorsport	(Australia) David Wall (Australia) Des Wall (Australia) Trevor Symonds	Mitsubishi Lancer GSR Evo IX	202	9
EXC	A	38	Alan East Motorsport	(Australia) David Wall (Australia) Des Wall (Australia) Trevor Symonds	2.0 L Mitsubishi 4G63T I4	202	9
