= BMW 1 Series (E87) =

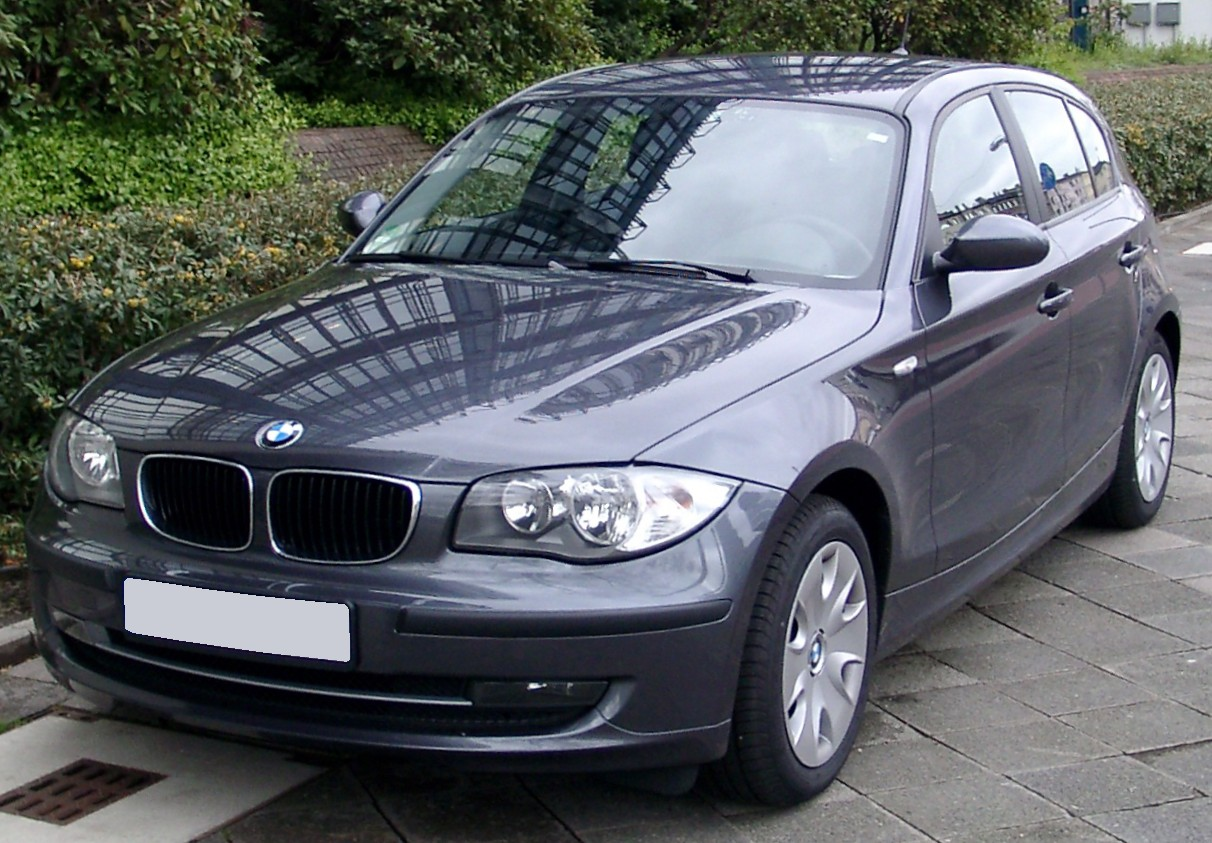

Overview
- Manufacturer: BMW
- Model code: E81 (3-door hatchback); E82 (coupe); E87 (5-door hatchback); E88 (convertible)
- Production: 2004–2013
- Model years: 2005–2011 (up to 2013 for coupe and convertible)
- Assembly: Germany: Leipzig; Regensburg
- Designer: Peter Gabath, Marc Michael Markefka (E82); Chris Chapman (E87)

Body and chassis
- Class: Subcompact executive car (C)
- Body style: 2-door coupe 2-door convertible 3-door hatchback 5-door hatchback
- Layout: Front-engine, rear-wheel-drive
- Platform: BMW L2
- Related: BMW Z4 (E89); BMW 3 Series (E90)

Powertrain
- Engine: Petrol: 1.6-2.0 L N43/N45/N46 I4; 3.0 L N52 I6; 3.0 L N54/N55 I6 turbo Diesel: 2.0 L M47/N47 I4 turbo-diesel
- Transmission: 5-speed Manual; 6-speed Manual; 6-speed ZF 6HP Automatic; 6-speed GM 6L45 automatic 7-speed Magna 7DCI600 M-DCT dual-clutch

Dimensions
- Wheelbase: 2,660 mm (104.7 in)
- Length: 4,227–4,380 mm (166.4–172.4 in)
- Width: 1,748–1,803 mm (68.8–71.0 in)
- Height: 1,420–1,430 mm (55.9–56.3 in)
- Curb weight: 1,245–1,540 kg (2,745–3,395 lb)

Chronology
- Predecessor: BMW 3 Series Compact
- Successor: E81/E87: 1 Series (F20/F21); E82/E88: 2 Series (F22/F23)

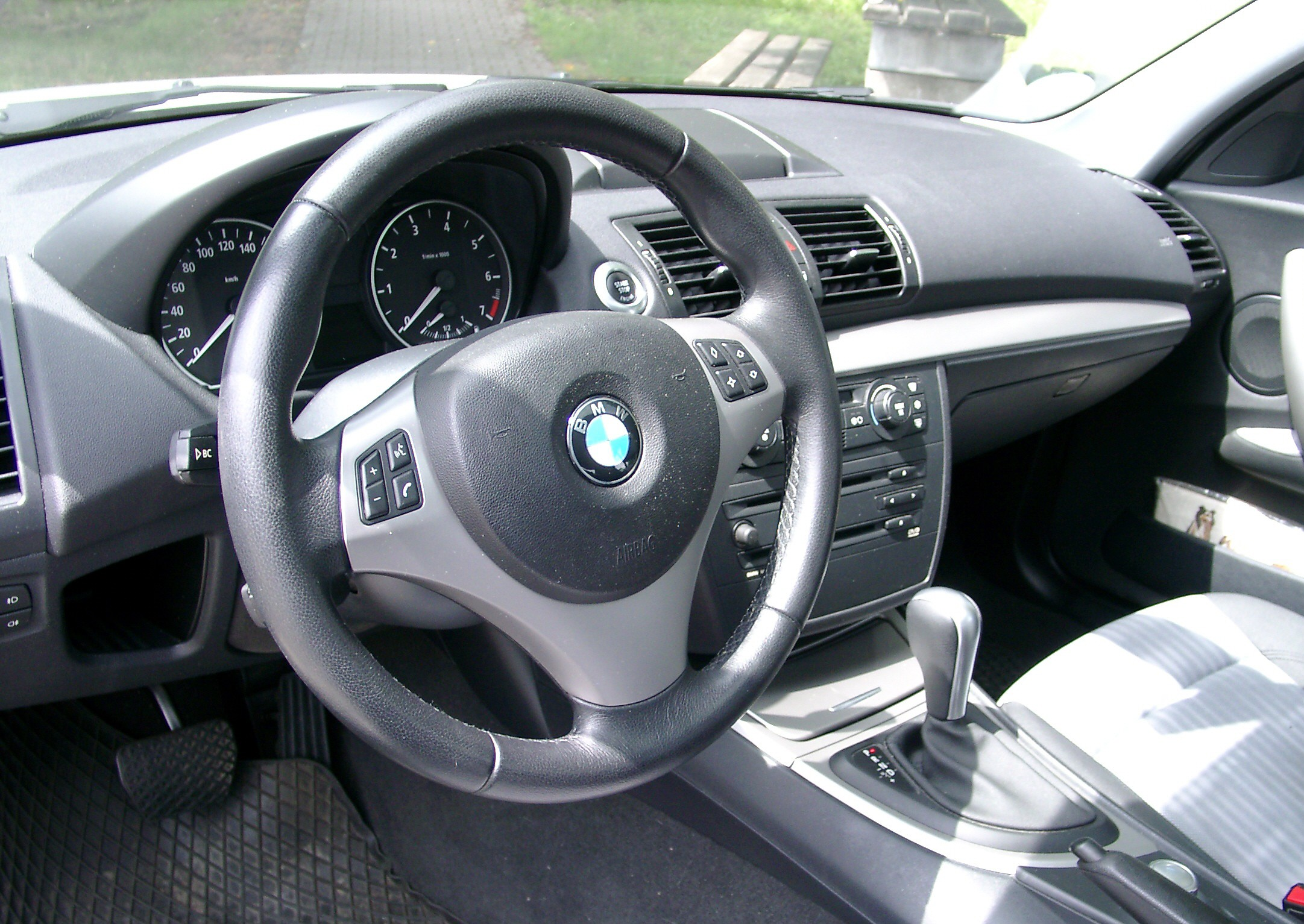
Interior

The first generation of the BMW 1 Series consists of the BMW E81 (3-door hatchback), BMW E82 (coupe), BMW E87 (5-door hatchback) and BMW E88 (convertible) compact cars. The E81/E82/E87/E88 generation was produced from 2004 until 2013 and is sometimes collectively referred to as the E8x. The E8x replaced the 3 Series Compact as the entry-level models of the BMW range.

The chassis has an aluminum multi-link suspension, and a rear-wheel drive layout with a longitudinally-mounted engine giving 50:50 weight balance, which was a rare configuration for a hatchback as most cars in this market segment use front-wheel drive. The engines available were four-cylinder turbo-diesel, four-cylinder naturally aspirated petrol, six-cylinder naturally aspirated petrol and six-cylinder turbocharged petrol (the latter only available on coupe and convertible models).

The highest performance trim is the 1 Series M Coupé which was powered by the BMW N54 turbocharged inline-six engine mated to a six-speed manual transmission. It was produced in only the coupe body style and is considered the predecessor to the BMW M2.

Following the introduction of the F20/F21 1 Series in 2011, the E81/E87 hatchback models began to be phased out, while the E82/E88 coupes and convertibles remained in production until 2013, when they were replaced by the F22/F23 2 Series models.

== Development and launch ==
Initially, BMW considered adopting the Rover R30 design program into the upcoming 1 Series; however, it was eventually decided to develop the E8x alongside the E90 3 Series. The E8x shares approximately 60% of components with the E90, including front and rear suspension, structure, chassis, engines, drivetrain, hardware and electronic elements.

The 1 Series was developed under design director Chris Bangle, At the 2002 Geneva Motor Show, the CS1 Concept previewed the 1 Series design. with Christopher Chapman leading the exterior design for the hatchback models.

The first 1 Series production models – in the E87 five-door hatchback body style – were launched at the Paris Motor Show in September 2004.

In May 2005, in a commercial for the 1 Series Hatchback, Kermit the Frog was shown driving a BMW 1 Series around in a desert making figure-eights, showcasing the car's agility.

In 2012, a number of 1 Series vehicles were stolen in the United Kingdom, due to thieves programming a blank key fob to start the car through the on-board diagnostics (OBD) connection. This security flaw was later patched, for both existing vehicles and new cars produced since.

=== Model year changes ===
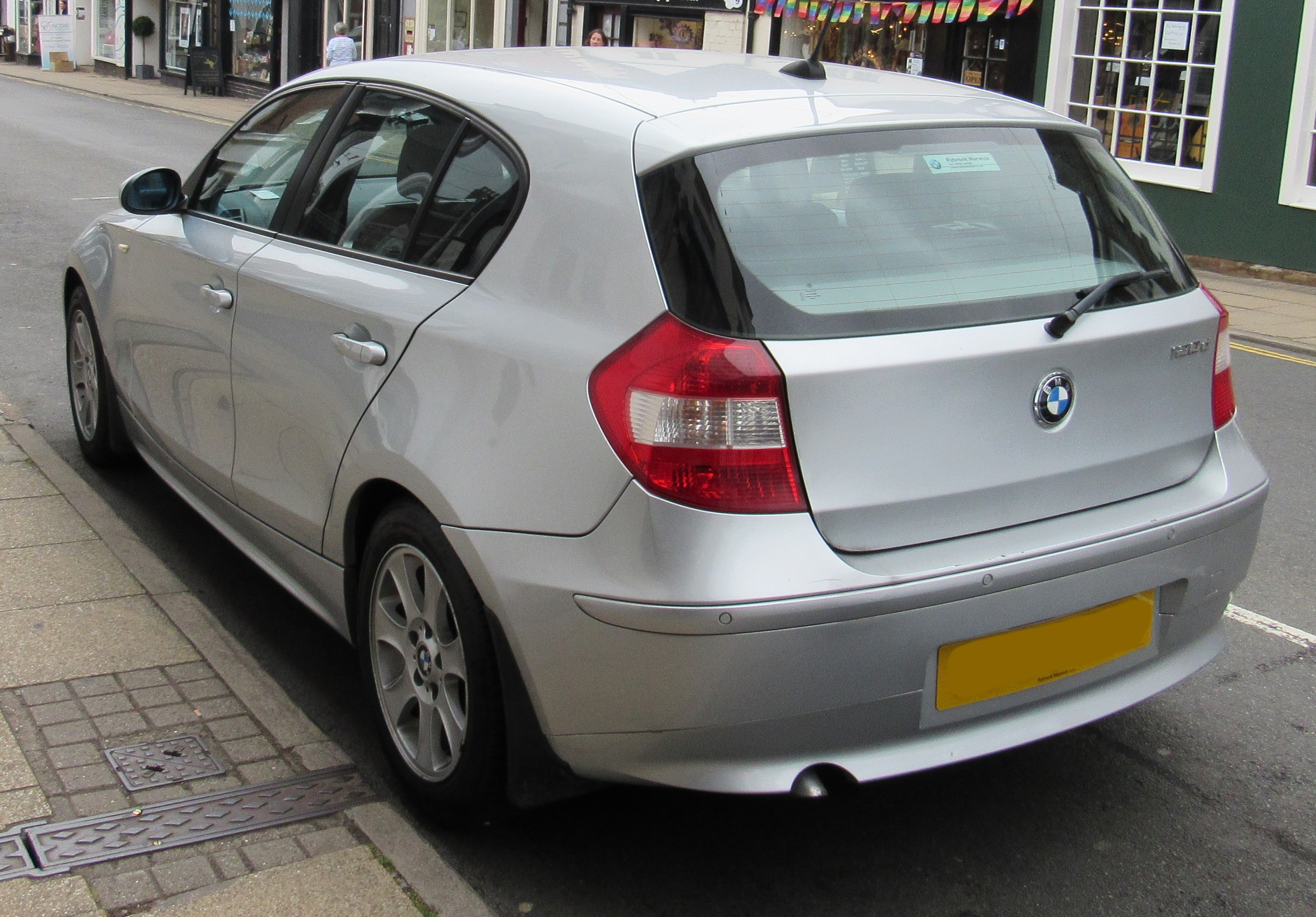
Pre-facelift E87

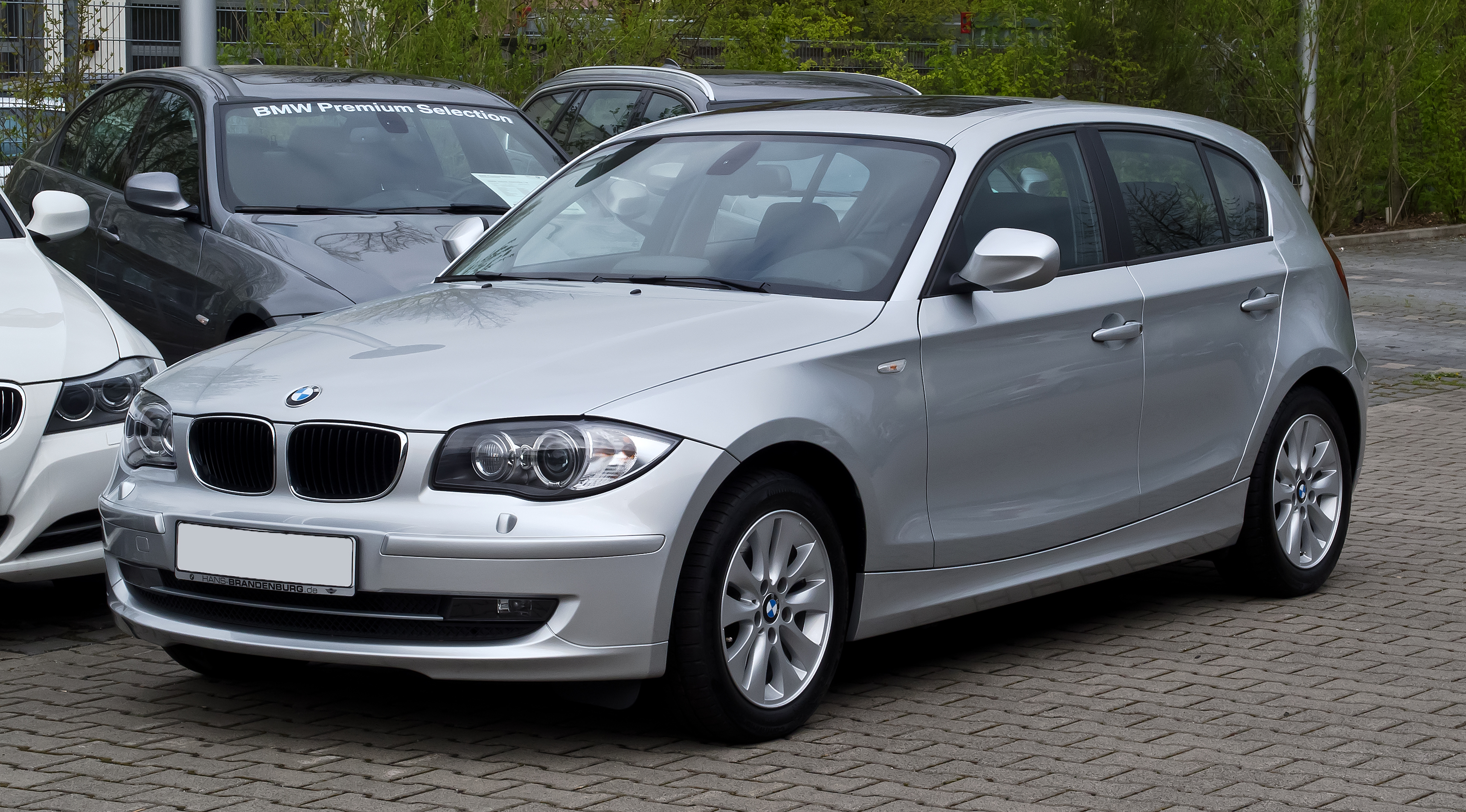

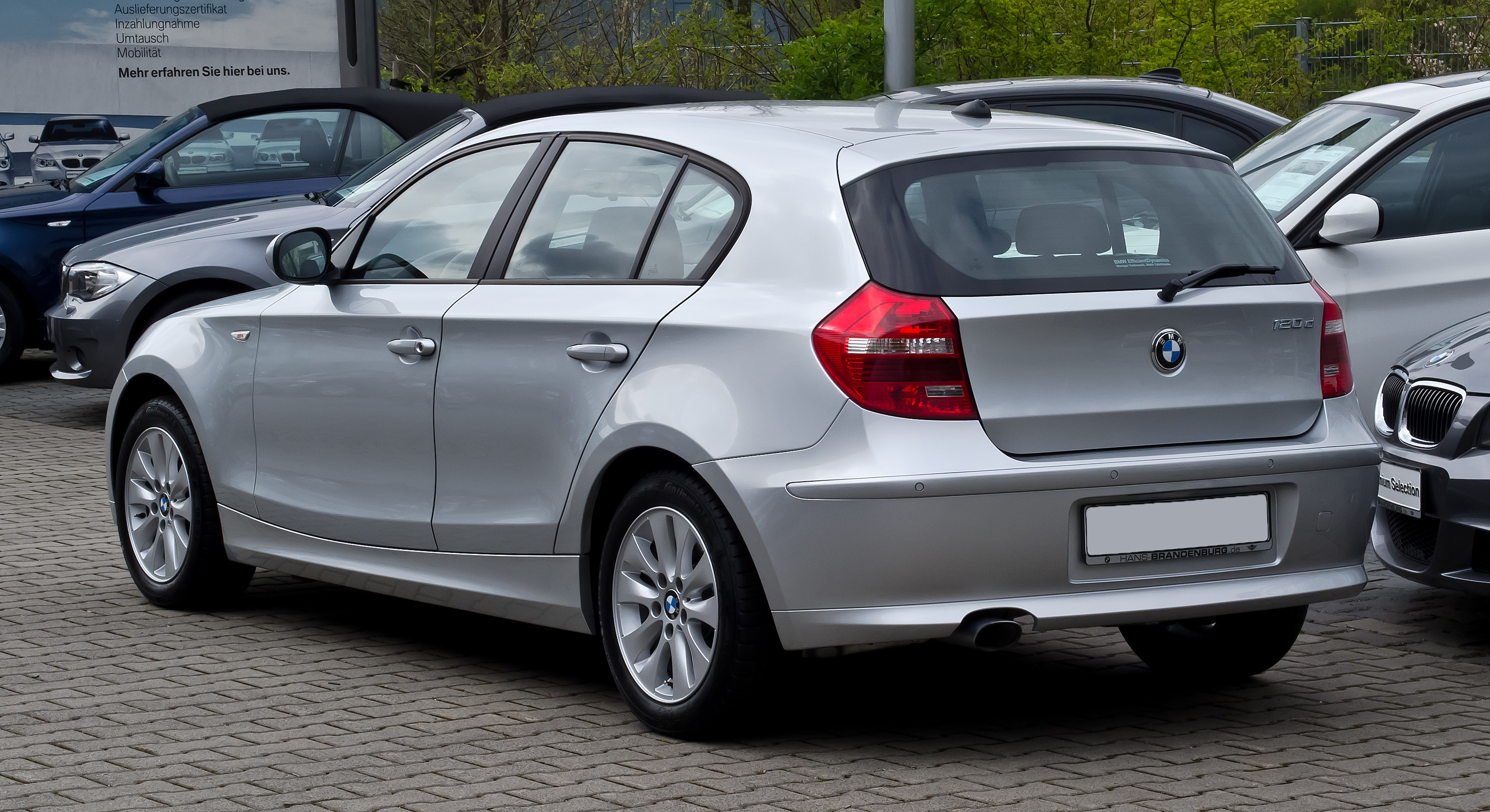
Post-facelift E87

==== 2007 ====
In March 2007, the E87 five-door hatchback received a facelift (also called LCI). Changes included the N43 four-cylinder engine replacing the N45 and N46 engines, various changes to improve fuel economy (marketed as EfficientDynamics), electric power steering replacing the traditional hydraulic power steering, revised bumpers and interior changes.

In May 2007, the E81 three-door hatchback models were released.

In November 2007, the E82 coupe models were released, followed by the E88 convertible models soon after.

==== 2010 ====
In 2010 (2011 Model Year), the E82 coupé and E88 convertible models received a facelift. Changes included headlights and taillight revisions, new front/rear bumpers and minor revisions to the interior. For the 135i model, the N55 engine replaced the N54. Even though many engines are the same, the facelifted 1 Series fuel consumption is slightly higher in some models such as the 123d, and slightly lower in some models such as the 120i.

== Body styles ==
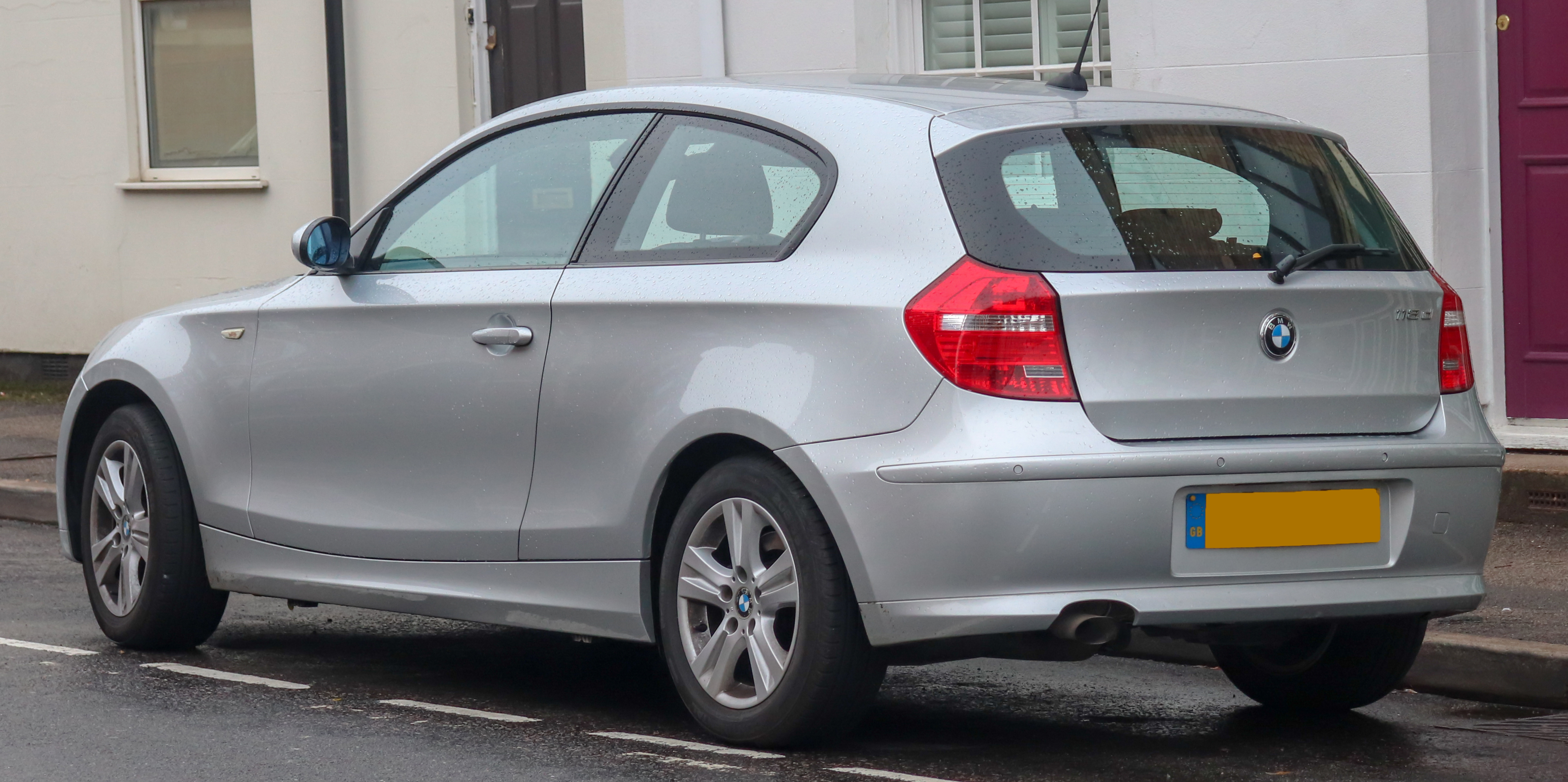
E81 3-door hatchback

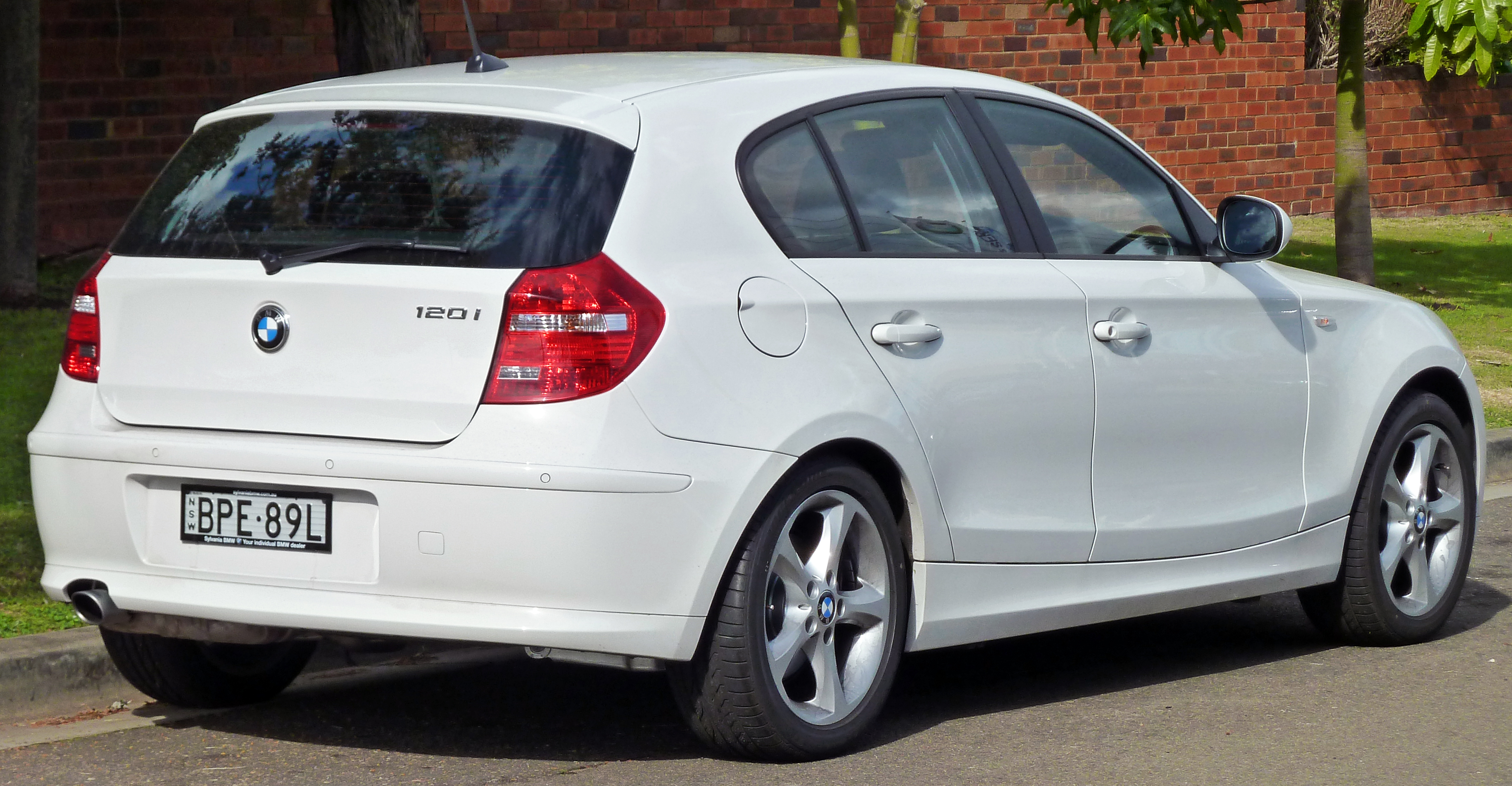
E87 5-door hatchback

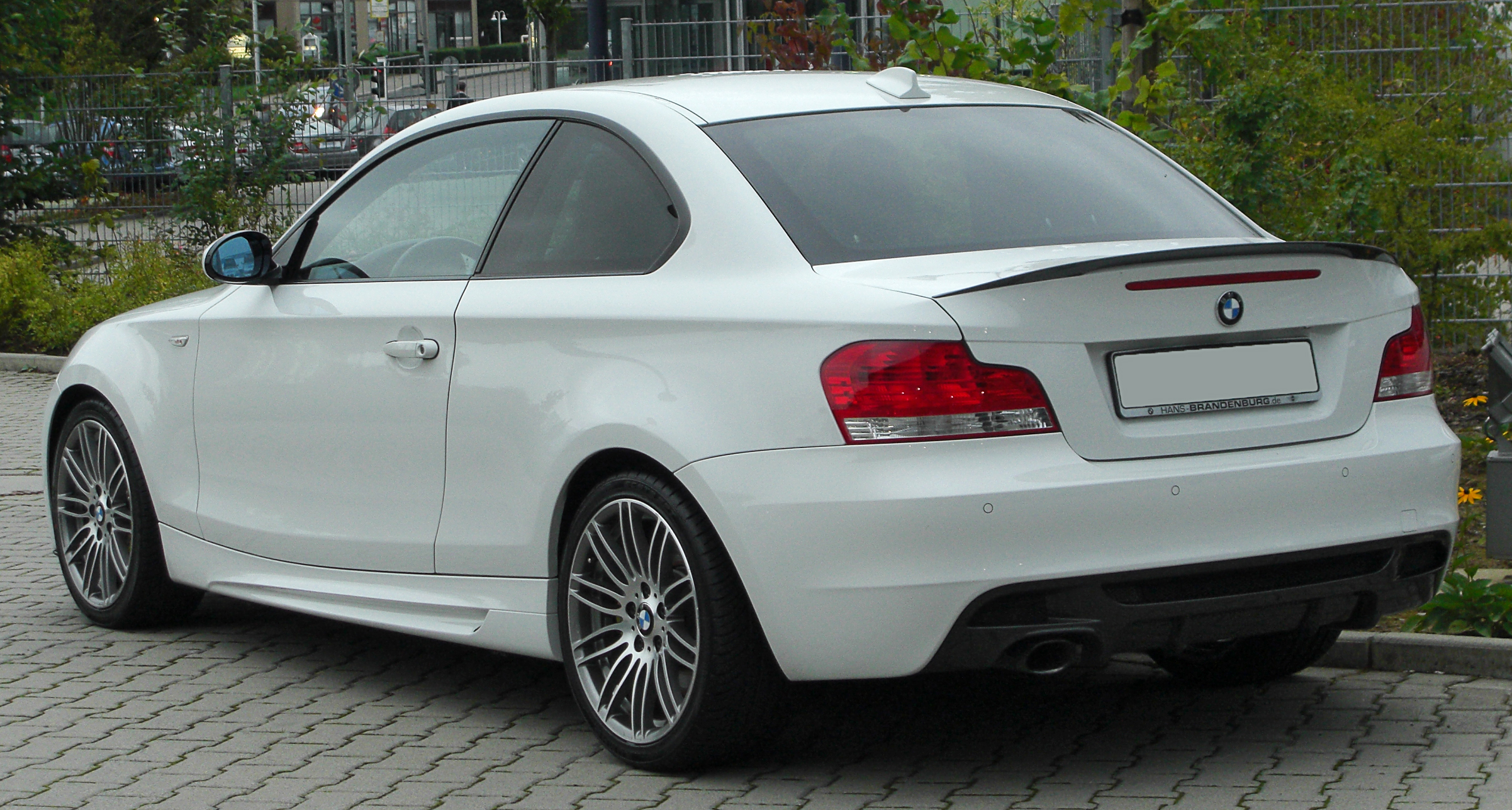
E82 coupe

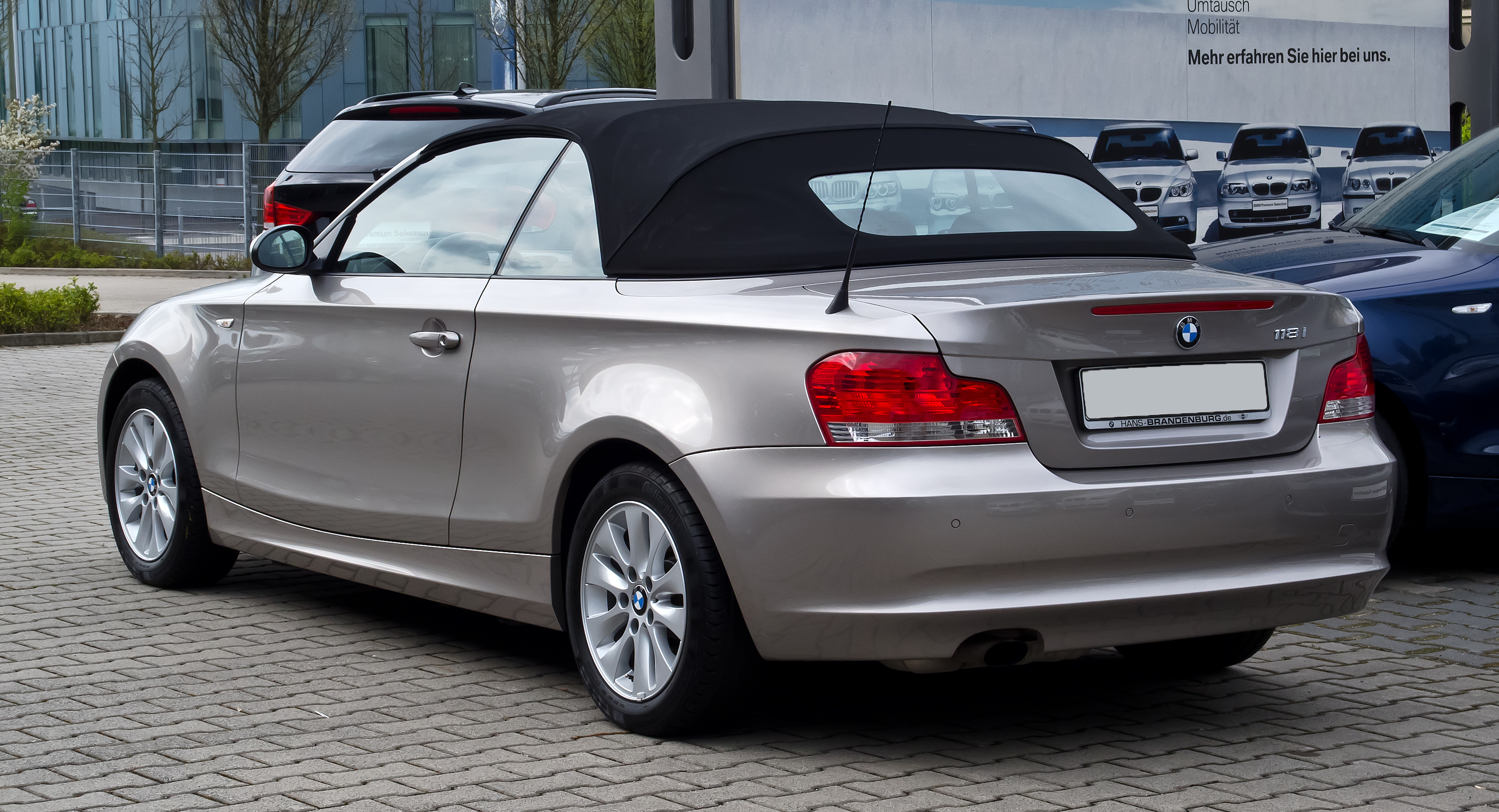
E88 convertible

Reviews of the 1 Series' exterior styling were mixed, with the unusual proportions of the hatchback model often receiving criticism.

=== 5-door hatchback (E87) ===
The 1 Series was launched globally in September 2004 as the E87 five-door hatchback.

The E87 was produced from 2004 until 2011, with the model range consisting of the 116i, 116d, 118i, 118d, 120i, 120d, 123d and 130i. Kerb Weight: 1340 kg (2954 lbs.).

=== 3-door hatchback (E81) ===
The E81 three-door hatchback models were produced from July 2007 until 2012. It was designed before the 5 door hatchback, coupé and convertible versions (hence its lower e-number), but its introduction was delayed until 2007 when it was unveiled at the Geneva Motor Show.

As per the five-door body style, the model range consisted of the 116i, 116d, 118i, 118d, 120i, 120d, 123d and 130i. The overall length is the same as the five-door models, and the kerb weight is 10 kg (22 lb) lighter.

=== 2-door coupe (E82) ===
The 1 Series Coupé (E82) was designed before the 5 door hatchback and convertible versions (hence its lower e-number), but, like the 3-door hatchback, its introduction was delayed until 2007 when it was unveiled at the Frankfurt Motor Show and went on sale on 24 November 2007.

The model range consisted of the 118d, 118i, 120i, 120d, 123d, 125i, 125se, 128i, 135i, 135is, and the M Coupé. In North America, the E82 went on sale in October 2007 with the 128i and the 135i models. The E82 was produced until August 2013.

=== 2-door convertible (E88) ===
The E88 convertible models were produced from 2007 until June 2013. The model range consisted of the 118d, 118i, 120i, 120d, 123d, 125i, 128i, 135i, and 135is.

The E88 uses a fabric roof (unlike the E93 3 Series convertible, which uses a folding metal roof).

== Engines ==
The factory specifications are as follows:

=== Petrol ===
Model	Year	Engine	Power	Torque
116i	2004–2011	1.6 L N45 inline-4	85 kW (114 hp; 116 PS)	150 N⋅m (111 lb⋅ft)
116i	2007-2011	1.6 L N43 inline-4	90 kW (121 hp; 122 PS)	160 N⋅m (118 lb⋅ft)
116i	2009-2011	2.0 L N43 inline-4	95 kW (127 hp; 129 PS)	185 N⋅m (136 lb⋅ft)
118i	2005–2007	2.0 L N46 inline-4	95 kW (127 hp; 129 PS)	180 N⋅m (133 lb⋅ft)
118i	2007–2009	2.0 L N43 inline-4	105 kW (141 hp; 143 PS)	190 N⋅m (140 lb⋅ft)
118i	2009-2011	2.0 L N43 inline-4	90 kW (121 hp; 122 PS)	185 N⋅m (136 lb⋅ft)
120i	2004–2007	2.0 L N46 inline-4	110 kW (148 hp; 150 PS)	200 N⋅m (148 lb⋅ft)
120i	2007–2013	2.0 L N43 inline-4	125 kW (168 hp; 170 PS)	210 N⋅m (155 lb⋅ft)
120i	2006-2011	2.0 L N46N inline-4	115 kW (154 hp; 156 PS)	200 N⋅m (148 lb⋅ft)
125i	2007–2013	3.0 L N52 inline-6	160 kW (215 hp; 218 PS)	270 N⋅m (199 lb⋅ft)
128i	2008-2013	3.0 L N52 inline-6	170 kW (228 hp; 231 PS)	271 N⋅m (200 lb⋅ft)
130i	2005–2007	3.0 L N52 inline 6	195 kW (261 hp; 265 PS)	315 N⋅m (232 lb⋅ft)
130i	2007–2011	3.0 L N52 inline 6	190 kW (255 hp; 258 PS)	310 N⋅m (229 lb⋅ft)
135i	2007–2010	3.0 L N54 inline-6 turbo	225 kW (302 hp; 306 PS)	400 N⋅m (295 lb⋅ft)
135i	2010–2013	3.0 L N55 inline-6 turbo	225 kW (302 hp; 306 PS)	400 N⋅m (295 lb⋅ft)
135is	2013	3.0 L N55 inline-6 turbo	239 kW (321 hp; 325 PS)	430 N⋅m (317 lb⋅ft)
1M Coupe	2011–2012	3.0 L N54 inline-6 turbo	250 kW (335 hp; 340 PS)	450 N⋅m (332 lb⋅ft)

E87 130i with N52 engine

The 130i is the top model of the E81/E87 hatchback range and was released in September 2004. It is powered by the N52 3.0-litre naturally aspirated engine and transmission choices were a 6-speed manual or a 6-speed automatic.

In most countries, the 135i is the top model of the E82/E88 coupe/convertible range (excluding the limited production 1M Coupe). From 2007 to 2010, the 135i was powered by the N54 twin-turbo 3.0-litre engine with a 6-speed manual or a 6-speed automatic transmission. From 2010, the 135i was upgraded to the N55 single-turbo 3.0-litre engine with a 6-speed manual or a 7-speed dual-clutch transmission. The differential fitted to the 135i uses double-helical ball bearings, which operate at a lower temperature and reach operating temperature quicker, due to a reduction of fluid required in the differential. The 135i brakes are 6-piston front calipers and 2-piston rear calipers, with disk sizes of 338 mm and 324 mm respectively. Another E82/E88 coupe/convertible trim sold only in the United States and Canada was the 128i, which was powered by a 170 kW (228 hp) version of the 3.0 litre BMW N52 inline-6 engine.

Another E82/E88 coupe/convertible trim sold only in the United States and Canada was the 128i, which was powered by a 170 kW (228 hp) version of the 3.0 litre BMW N52 inline-6 engine.

=== Diesel ===
Model	Year	Engine	Power	Torque
116d	2009–2011	2.0 L N47 inline-4 turbo	85 kW (114 hp; 116 PS)	260 N⋅m (192 lb⋅ft)
118d	2004–2007	2.0 L M47 inline-4 turbo	90 kW (121 hp; 122 PS)	280 N⋅m (207 lb⋅ft)
118d	2007–2013	2.0 L N47 inline-4 turbo	105 kW (141 hp; 143 PS)	300 N⋅m (221 lb⋅ft)
120d	2004–2007	2.0 L M47 inline-4 turbo	120 kW (161 hp; 163 PS)	340 N⋅m (251 lb⋅ft)
120d	2007–2013	2.0 L N47 inline-4 turbo	130 kW (174 hp; 177 PS)	350 N⋅m (258 lb⋅ft)
123d	2007–2013	2.0 L N47 inline-4 twin-turbo	150 kW (201 hp; 204 PS)	400 N⋅m (295 lb⋅ft)

=== Transmissions ===
In early 2006, the 5-speed manual transmission was phased out in favour of the 6-speed Getrag GS6 gearbox.

Several 6-speed automatic transmissions were used- the ZF 6HP for the 135i, GM 6L50 for the 128i, and GM 6L45 for 116i. A 7-speed Getrag dual-clutch transmission ("DCT") was available for the 135i model from 2010.

=== BMW Performance upgrades ===
BMW offered a "performance power kit" in two stages for the N55 engine. Stage 1 included an ECU remap with a power boost from 225 kW to 240 kW and 30Nm of extra torque – now peaking at 430Nm. If installed in an automatic 335i or 135i the torque peak is bumped up by another 20Nm to 450Nm. Stage 2 added some additional engine cooling through an additional supplementary radiator and larger cooling fan. Other upgrade options included a modified rear bumper and performance rear muffler. These options were all included as standard on the US spec 135iS.

== Special editions ==
=== 1 Series M Coupé ===
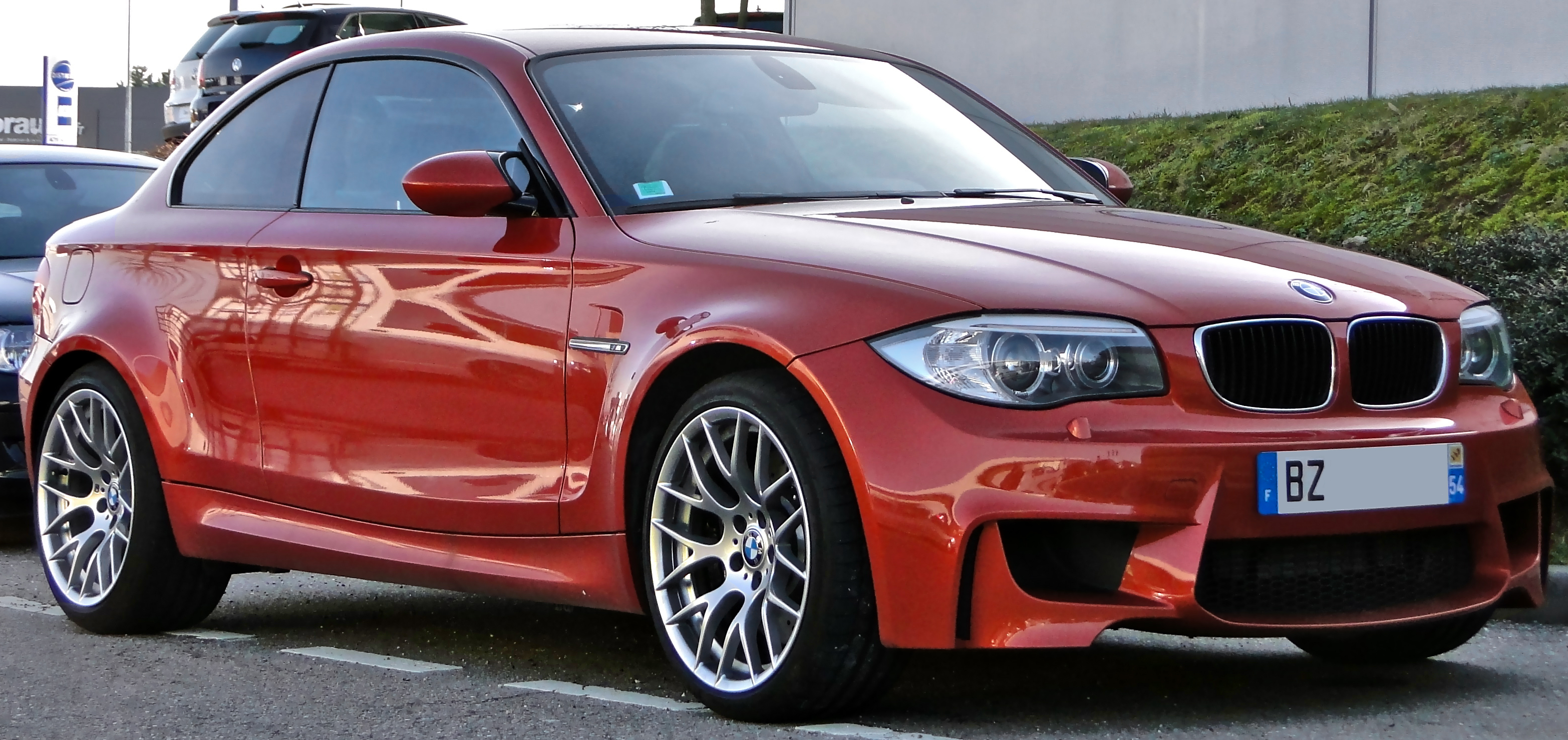

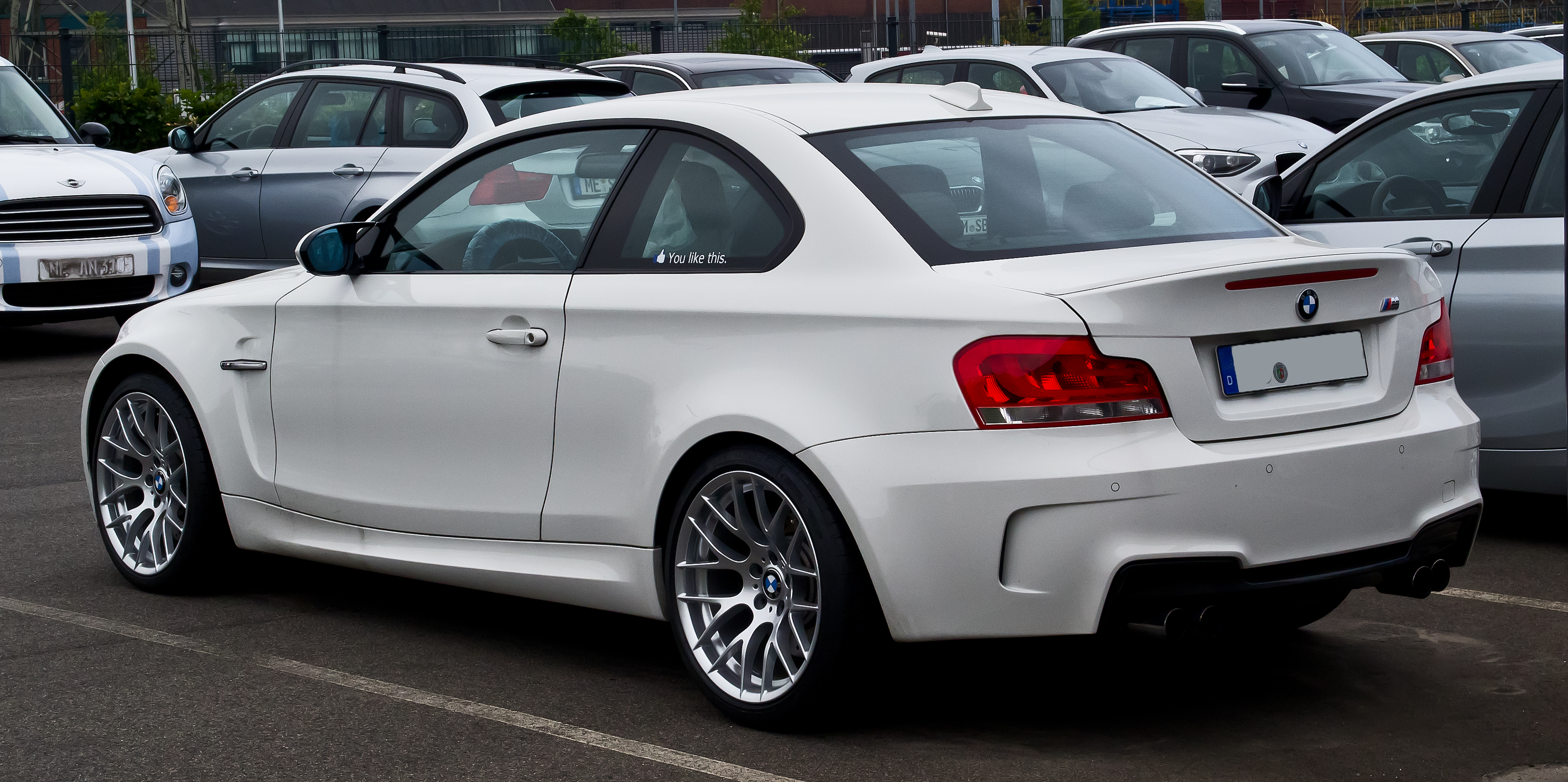
1M Coupe

The BMW 1 Series M Coupé (often referred to as the "1M") is the high-performance model of the E82 coupe range, sold under the BMW M performance sub-brand. While BMW naming convention would have called the car the "M1", an alternate name was chosen to avoid confusion with the BMW M1 supercar from the 1970's.

At the 2007 Tokyo Auto Show, BMW unveiled the 1 Series tii Concept, which was thought to be a preview of the M version of the 1 Series. However, the eventual 1M model appeared four years later and with significant differences, such as an engine with six-cylinders instead of four.

The 1M was BMW M's second turbocharged engine (after the S63 V8 which debuted in the X6M). The BMW N54 fitted to the 1M was originally being used in the E89 Z4 sDrive35is and has rated outputs of 250 kW (335 bhp) at 5,900 rpm and 450 N⋅m (332 lb⋅ft) from 1,500 to 4,500 rpm. An additional 50 N⋅m (37 lb⋅ft) is produced during overboost taking overall peak torque to 500 N⋅m (369 lb⋅ft). The sole transmission available was a six-speed manual.

The front and rear track widths were widened by 74 mm (2.9 in) and 46 mm (1.8 in) respectively and a limited-slip differential was used. As a result, the overall width is 1,803 mm (71.0 in). The curb weight is 3,296 lb (1,495 kg).

Initial plans were to limit production of the 1M Coupe to 2,700 units, but the final production total was 6,309.

The 1M Coupe placed third in the Evo Magazine 2011 Car of the Year awards. It also featured on Top Gear on 26 June 2011 and recorded a time of 1:25.0 around the Top Gear test track under damp conditions and received "Richard Hammond's Car of the Year 2011" award in the Top Gear magazine.

=== ActiveE electric car trial ===
The BMW ActiveE was an electric car based on the E82 coupe that was produced in small quantities for demonstration and testing purposes. The U.S. Environmental Protection Agency rated the range as 151 km (94 mi) and the energy consumption as 33 kW·h per 161 km (100 mi). The cars were leased to customers for two years, following which they were taken off the road. A total of 1,100 vehicles were produced, with 700 of these being delivered to U.S. customers beginning in January 2012.

=== Motorsports ===
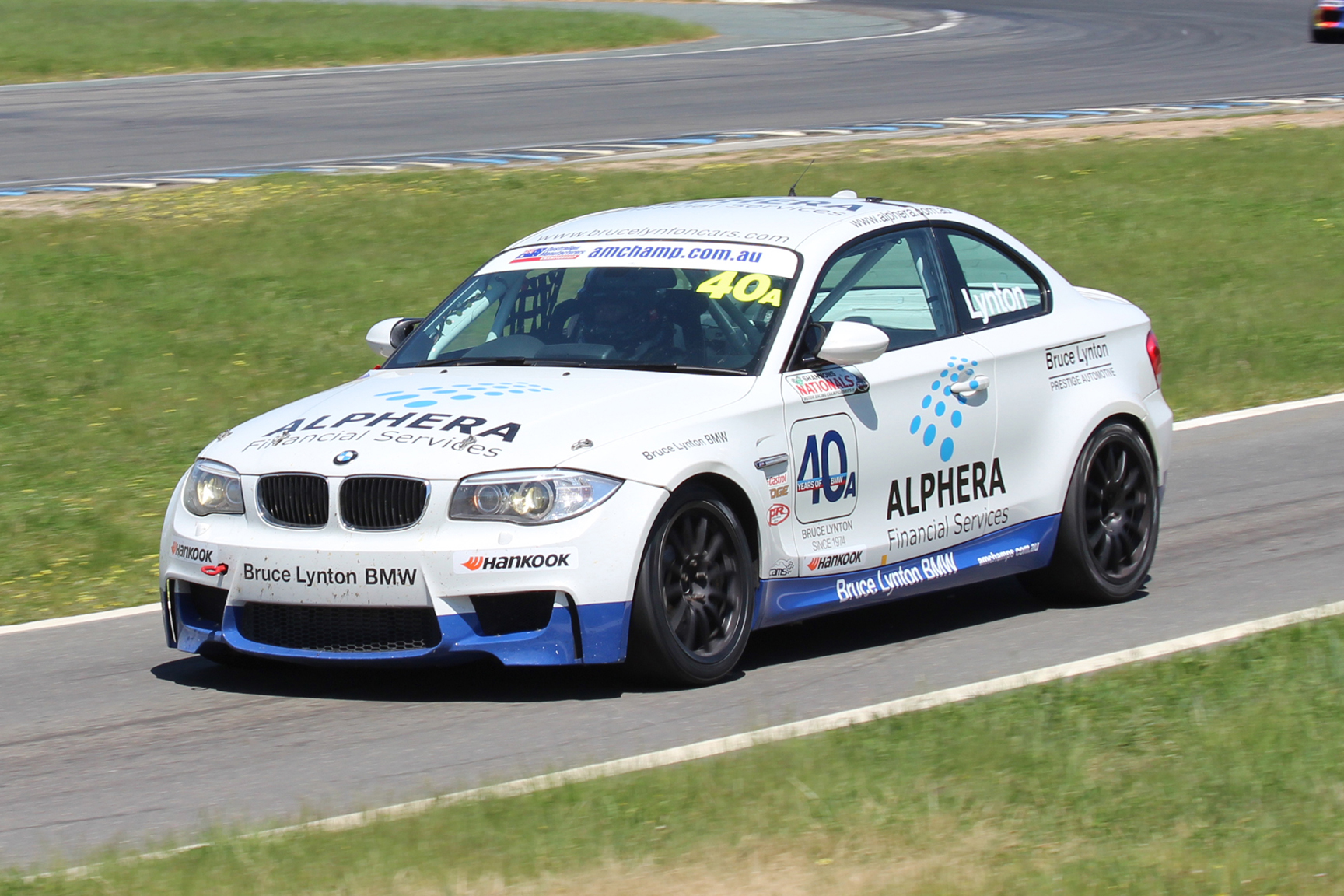
Beric Lynton won the 2014 Australian Production Car Championship driving a BMW 1M

In 2006, a BMW 120d modified with a BMW customer racing kit entered by "Schubert Motors" placed 5th at the Nurburgring 24 Hours in a field of 220 cars.

Beric Lynton won the 2014 Australian Production Car Championship driving a BMW 1M.

In 2019, the UK based 750 Motor Club introduced a one make mini endurance series using the 2004-2006 116i car. Modified from factory production specifications with a coil over suspension kit, reworked motorsport exhaust and re-programmed ECU the cars race in a 90-minute multiple driver format. For 2020, the series attracted regular grids of over 25 cars with more than 50 cars having been built by both privateers and professional teams.

=== BMW 135is (United States and Canada) ===
The 135is coupe and convertible model was sold only for the 2013 model year in the United States and Canada. In other markets, the next generation F20 1 Series had replaced the E82/E88 by this stage, with the top-of-the-line M135i sharing the same engine as the 135is.

The 135is is powered by an upgraded version of the N55 engine which produces 240 kW (322 hp) and 430 N⋅m (317 lb⋅ft), an additional 20 hp and 17 lb-ft of torque over the 135i. Other upgrades include sports suspension, an M Sport body kit, and 18-inch wheels.

== Production and sales ==
The 1 Series was built in Regensburg and Leipzig, Germany.

The E8x accounted for nearly one-fifth of the total BMW sales in 2008.

Sales statistics according to BMW's annual reports:

Year	Total	5-door E87	3-door E81	Coupé E82	Cabriolet E88	Comments
2004	39,247	39,247	-	-	-	Launched in September.
2005	149,493	149,493	-	-	-	
2006	151,918	151,918	-	-	-	
2007	165,803	133,525	30,984	1,287	7	Facelift in March. 3-door version launched in May.
2008	225,095	122,666	49,559	26,304	26,566	
2009	216,944	120,323	44,043	24,081	28,506	
2010	196,004	113,030	31,980	26,191	24,803	
2011	176,418					
2012	226,829					

== Safety ==
ANCAP test results* BMW 1 Series 116i 5 door hatch (2004)
Test	Score
Overall	5 /5 stars
Frontal offset	13.77/16
Side impact	15.60/16
Pole	2/2
Seat belt reminders	2/3
Whiplash protection	Not Assessed
Pedestrian protection	Poor
Electronic stability control	Standard

== Motorsport ==
=== British Touring Car Championship ===
A BMW 120d E87 was entered in the 2007 British Touring Car Championship as the series' first ever diesel car with Rick Kerry at the wheel. The car was uncompetitive but narrowly missed out on points at Rockingham.

The car briefly returned in the 2009 Season with Nick Leason but disappeared after three meetings.

=== Belgian Gentlemen Drivers Club ===
The ex-BTCC car later raced in the BGDC and was Class Champion in 2016 and 2019.

=== 750 Motor Club ===
Since 2019, the 750 Motor Club has run the 116 Endurance Trophy and 116 Sprint Trophy for the 116i and introduced the Coupe Cup for the 120i E82 in 2023.

1992 British Touring Car Champion Tim Harvey notably raced in the 116 Endurance Trophy in 2022, and the 120 Coupe Cup in 2023.

Three time BTCC Champion Matt Neal made an appearance in the 116 Endurance Trophy in 2023.

1993 BTCC Runner-up Steve Soper tested the 116i in 2022, and made an appearance in the 120 Coupe Cup in 2023.

=== BMW 120d Rallycross Cup ===
The Irish Rallycross Championship introduced a one-make series for 2004-to-2013-spec BMW 120ds for the 2025 Season.
