= Chelsea Angelo =

Australian racing driver (born 1996)

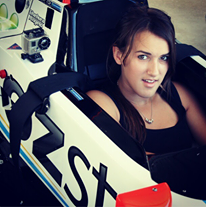
- Angelo in 2012
- Nationality: Australian
- Born: Chelsea Jade Angelo; 2 June 1996 (age 30) Melbourne, Victoria, Australia

TCR Australia
- Categorisation: FIA Silver
- Years active: 2019
- Teams: Kelly Racing
- Starts: 10
- Wins: 0
- Poles: 0
- Fastest laps: 0
- Best finish: 25th in 2019

Previous series
- 2012 2013 2014 2015–16 2018: Victorian Formula Ford Championship; Australian Formula Ford Championship; Formula 3 Australia; V8 Supercars Development Series; Porsche GT3 Cup Challenge Australia

Chelsea Jade Angelo (born 2 June 1996, in Melbourne) is a racing driver from Australia who competes in TCR Australia and previously contested the V8 Supercars Development Series.

== Racing record ==
=== Karting career summary ===
Season	Series	Position
2010	Australian National Sprint Kart Championship - Junior National Light	20th
2010	Victorian Open Kart Titles - Junior National Light	23rd
2010	City of Melbourne Kart Titles - Junior National Light	7th
2011	Victorian Golden Power Series - Junior National Light	4th
2011	Victorian Golden Power Series - Junior Max	2nd
2011	City of Melbourne Kart Titles - Junior National Light	3rd

=== Career summary ===
Season	Series	Team	Races	Wins	Poles	F/laps	Podiums	Points	Position
2012	Victorian Formula Ford Championship	N/A	3	0	0	0	0	64	19th
2013	Victorian Formula Ford Championship	Evans Motorsport Group	7	1	0	1	2	70	15th
2013	Australian Formula Ford Championship	Evans Motorsport Group	12	0	0	0	0	37	13th
2014	Australian Formula 3 Championship – National Class	Chelsea Angelo Racing; Evans Motorsport Group	14	8	2	7	14	204	2nd
2015	V8 Supercars Dunlop Series	THR Developments	2	0	0	0	0	90	33rd
2016	Supercars Dunlop Series	Dragon Motor Racing; Garry Rogers Motorsport	9	0	0	0	0	583	21st
2016	Supercars Dunlop Series	MW Motorsport	6	0	0	0	0	583	21st
2018	Porsche GT3 Cup Challenge Australia	Wall Racing	16	0	0	0	5	530	5th
2019	TCR Australia	Kelly Racing	10	0	0	0	0	56	25th
2021	TCR Australia	Melbourne Performance Centre	9	0	0	0	0	134	20th

=== TCR Australia results ===
TCR Australia results
Year	Team	Car	1	2	3	4	5	6	7	8	9	10	11	12	13	14	15	16	17	18	19	20	21	Position	Points
2019	Kelly Racing	Holden Astra TCR	SMP; R1; 12	SMP; R2; 14	SMP; R3; Ret	PHI; R4; Ret	PHI; R5; 12	PHI; R6; Ret	BEN; R7; Ret	BEN; R8; 12	BEN; R9; Ret	QLD; R10; DNS	QLD; R11; DNS	QLD; R12; DNS	WIN; R13	WIN; R14	WIN; R15	SAN; R16	SAN; R17	SAN; R18	BEN; R19; Ret	BEN; R20; DNS	BEN; R21; DNS	25th	56
2021	Melbourne Performance Centre	Volkswagen Golf GTI TCR	SYM; R1	SYM; R2	SYM; R3	PHI; R4; 16	PHI; R5; 13	PHI; R6; 11	BAT; R7; 20	BAT; R8; 17	BAT; R9; 19	SMP; R10; 19	SMP; R11; 15	SMP; R12; 19	BAT; R13	BAT; R14	BAT; R15							20th	134
