= Garry Rogers Motorsport =

Australian motor racing team

- Manufacturer: Peugeot
- Team Principal: TBA
- Team Manager: Stefan Millard
- Race Drivers: TCR Australia; Garry Rogers Motorsport; 5. Jordan Cox; 71. Ben Bargwanna; GRM Team Valvoline; 18. Aaron Cameron; 81. Ryan Casha
- Chassis: Peugeot 308
- Debut: 1996
- Drivers' Championships: 0
- Round wins: 11
- Race wins: 21
- 2019 position: 23
- 9th (3145 pts)

Garry Rogers Motorsport is an Australian motor racing team owned by the late racing driver, Garry Rogers who began the team to further his own racing efforts. Based in Melbourne, originally out of a Nissan dealership owned by Rogers, the team has competed in a variety of touring car series in Australia ranging from relatively modest Nissan production cars to Chevrolet NASCAR race cars to building the GT specification Holden Monaro 427C. The team won the Bathurst 1000 in 2000 and also won both of the Bathurst 24 Hour races which were held in 2002 and 2003. In 2013 the team celebrated its 50th year in racing since Rogers made his debut.

Rogers has been famed as a talent spotter with a number of drivers finding their feet within GRM, including Steven Richards, Jason Bargwanna, Garth Tander, Jamie Whincup, Lee Holdsworth and Scott McLaughlin. Many of these drivers became future champions and Bathurst 1000 winners.

The team competed in the 2019 TCR Australia Touring Car Series with two Renault Mégane R.S TCR and an Alfa Romeo Giulietta Veloce TCR. They entered the 2020 season as Renault Sport GRM, after being sponsored by Renault Australia, in which they ran three Renault Mégane R.S TCRs.

In 2018, Garry Rogers Motorsport built the first batch of S5000 single-seater race cars as a part of a partnership with the newly created S5000 Australian Drivers' Championship race category.

On 23 October 2025, it was announced that team owner Garry Rogers died at the age of 80.

== The early years ==
Garry Rogers Motorsport has its origins in 1963 when Garry Rogers began racing Appendix J Holdens. He then went on to race Sports Sedans during the late 1960s and the 1970s. In the mid-1970s, Rogers got more serious, running a BDA Escort in Sports Sedans with some success, before moving onto an ex-Ian Geoghegan Holden Monaro. Around this time, in late 1978, Rogers also moved into the Australian Touring Car Championship as a privateer in an ex-Bob Jane Holden Torana. He ran through until the end of 1979 in touring cars before turning his attention back to Sports Sedans, putting in a big effort in the 1981 Australian Sports Sedan Championship driving a Holden Torana LX SS A9X Hatchback.

The team disbanded while Rogers concentrated on his Nissan dealership and he drove for other teams at the Bathurst 1000, including Allan Browne's Re-Car team in 1982 paired with Ron Wanless (who famously drove the Commodore the wrong direction through pit lane without incurring a penalty). Rogers was a top-ten qualifier at Bathurst in 1983, partnering Clive Benson-Brown to a 13th-place finish after suffering brake problems, while in 1984, he drove with Melbourne's motor racing 'Gentleman', Captain Peter Janson in the Castrol 500 at Sandown, and the James Hardie 1000 at Bathurst in Janson's Commodore. The car failed to finish both endurance races.

As Australian touring car racing went to regulations based on FIA Group A from 1985, Rogers once again only drove at Sandown and Bathurst, teaming with Melbourne solicitor Jim Keogh in Keogh's ex-JPS Team BMW 635 CSi. After not finishing at Sandown, the pair finished sixth outright at Bathurst, four laps behind the TWR Jaguar XJS of John Goss and Armin Hahne.

GRM re-emerged in 1986 when he purchased a BMW 635 CSi from JPS Team BMW and drove it throughout that year's touring car season. The year included a win in one of the AMSCAR Series races at Amaroo Park. Rogers BMW carried sponsorship from Bob Jane T-Marts, with the car painted in Bob Jane's famous Hugger Orange. At the 1986 James Hardie 1000, Rogers teamed with Queenslander Charlie O'Brien. After qualifying 22nd, O'Brien started the race, but the car was struck down by a slipping clutch which led to its retirement after just 19 laps with Rogers not actually getting to drive.

After spending 1987 on ice, the team came back in late 1988 with a Les Small (Roadways Racing) prepared, but unsponsored Holden VL Commodore SS Group A SV at the Tooheys 1000, sharing the drive with American John Andretti, the nephew of motor racing legend Mario Andretti. Rogers had originally wanted Mario to drive with him at Bathurst, hoping his high-profile would help land a major sponsor, but the 1978 World Champion was unavailable and suggested his nephew as a replacement. The younger Andretti was recovering from a broken leg (he still needed crutches outside of the car), continued the tradition of American drivers not having a good Bathurst record and on lap 37 put the Commodore into the wall at Reid Park. To his credit, Andretti admitted the accident was caused by driver error, going too fast, too soon, on cold tyres.

The Commodore was also run in selected (mostly Victorian based) rounds throughout the 1989 Australian Touring Car Championship. For the 1989 Bathurst 1000, Rogers accepted an offer to drive Colin Bond's Caltex CXT Race Team's second Ford Sierra RS500 with Ken Mathews (the car was the Sierra that Tony Longhurst and Tomas Mezera had driven to victory the 1988 race). Rogers and Mathews failed to finish the race. In the early 1990s, GRM turned its attention to the Calder Park Thunderdome and the AUSCAR series running a variety of Ford Falcons during the category's heyday (during the 1990s AUSCAR fields were dominated by the Holden Commodore). At first, Rogers drove the car himself alongside Paul Fordham. Garry slowly eased himself out of regular driving, putting Steven Richards in the seat. The team also secured a major sponsor in Valvoline along the way.

In this time, the team also competed in Production Car racing at events such as the Winton 300 and Bathurst 12 Hour. The team used a Nissan Pulsar and a 300ZX due to Rogers' links with Nissan (he owns a Nissan dealership in Melbourne). Rogers also ran and then assisted Formula Ford teams during the 1990s, helping title sponsor Valvoline's promotion of Australian motorsport, as well as helping drivers such as Steven Richards and Garth Tander.

== Super Touring ==
GRM joined the fledgling Australian Super Touring Championship in 1995 with young lead driver Steven Richards driving the team's Alfa Romeo 155. Quickly Richards was established as one of the series leading privateers, finishing ninth in the burgeoning championship. In 1995 the team replaced the Alfa with a Honda Accord and Richards used it to win the Privateers Cup and place fifth in the championship behind the two factory supported BMW and Audi drivers. The team continued into 1996, replacing the Honda with a Nissan Primera but the team's form slipped, distracted by their new V8 Supercar and Richards finished seventh, losing the Privateers Cup to Cameron McLean.

== Supercars Championship ==
=== 1990s ===
Garry Rogers Motorsport joined the Australian Touring Car Championship in 1996 with Richards a driving a Holden VS Commodore sourced from Gibson Motorsport. The team expanded to two cars in 1998, with Jason Bargwanna driving the second car. Richards went to England for a test drive with the Nissan team in the British Touring Car Championship and was replaced by 1997 Australian Formula Ford champion Garth Tander. Bargwanna scored the team's first race win at Calder that year, also finishing second for the round. Tander scored the team's first round win in 1999 at Queensland Raceway and he and Bargwanna finished second in the Queensland 500 in the same year.

=== 2000s ===
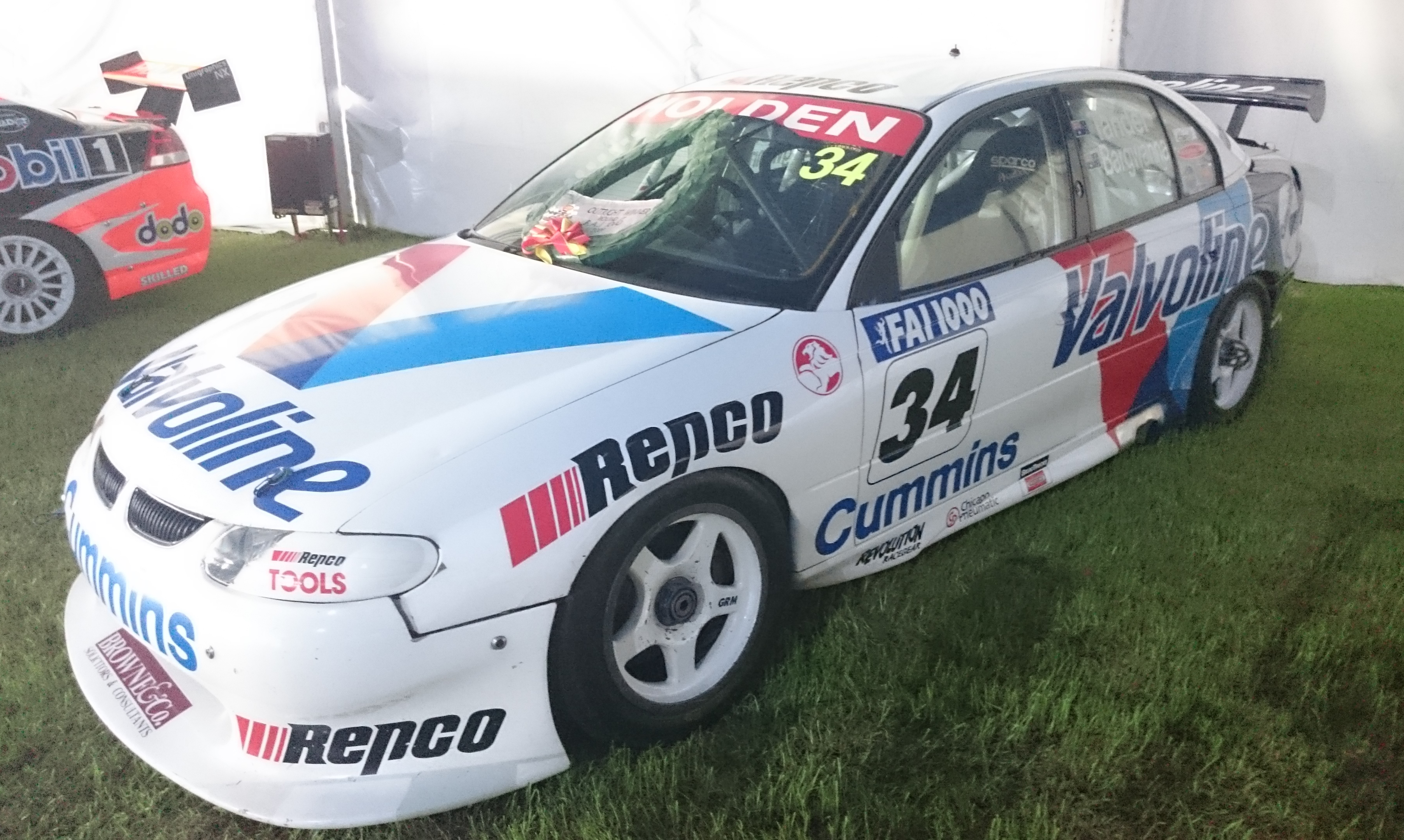
The Garry Rogers Motorsport entered Holden Commodore VT in which Garth Tander and Jason Bargwanna won the 2000 FAI 1000 at Bathurst. The car is pictured in 2018

The 2000 season remains the team's most successful season to date. Tander won three rounds (including the Bathurst 1000 with Bargwanna) and finished runner-up to Mark Skaife in the title. Tander led the series early in the season but a couple of bad rounds in the middle of the season allowed Skaife to take the championship lead. Compared to 2000, 2001 was a poor season for the team, with Tander and Bargwanna finishing tenth and fifteenth in the points respectively and a best finish of second for Tander in Canberra. Bargwanna took his final win for the team at Surfers Paradise in 2002 before switching to Larkham Motor Sport for the 2003 season. He was replaced by 2002 Australian Formula Ford champion Jamie Whincup.

GRM was one of the first teams to use the Holden VY Commodore for the 2003 season, with Tander driving the new model car. Whincup would drive an older model VX Commodore. Whincup was sacked at the end of the season and was replaced by Cameron McConville for 2004. McConville took the team's first round win in two years in controversial circumstances at Winton when he passed Rick Kelly on the second last corner of the race just after the end of a yellow flag zone. Tander left the team at the end of 2004 for what was then called Kmart Racing and was replaced by Andrew Jones. Jones was sacked after Bathurst and was replaced by Dean Canto for two of the final three rounds of 2005 and the 2006 season. Lee Holdsworth also joined the team in 2006, as well as driving in the final round of 2005, with McConville moving to Paul Weel Racing. The team scored one race win in 2006 with Canto winning the reverse grid race at Barbagallo after Team Kiwi Racing driver Paul Radisich spun off the track at the last corner.

2007 saw the team's first major livery change since joining the sport, with the traditional blue, white and red replaced by black, silver and red. Major sponsor Repco also left the team. Holdsworth and Canto remained with the team with Canto driving a new Holden VE Commodore. Holdsworth remained in a VZ Commodore until the Queensland Raceway round. Holdsworth was involved in a serious crash in Round 4 at Winton when his car slid off the circuit and went backwards into the wall at high speed. Holdsworth rebounded quickly to score his maiden V8 Supercar round win at Oran Park Raceway. After qualifying a career best fourth, Holdsworth dominated the final race of the weekend in very wet weather after a good strategy call from the team at the start of the race. Holdsworth was commended for his composure during the race while other, more experienced drivers made errors.

Michael Caruso joined the team for 2008, replacing Canto. No wins came for the team in this season, however Holdsworth finished second at the Clipsal 500 and he and Caruso finished fifth at the L&H 500. Caruso won his first race in 2009, holding off a late race charge from Alex Davison in the Sunday race at Hidden Valley. Holdsworth was again on the podium at the Clipsal 500, finishing second in the Saturday race. The team also achieved a podium at Bathurst, with Holdsworth and Caruso finishing third. The second car of Greg Ritter and David Besnard looked like being in a position to win the race in the closing stages before a poorly timed safety car meant that they only finished ninth.

=== 2010s ===
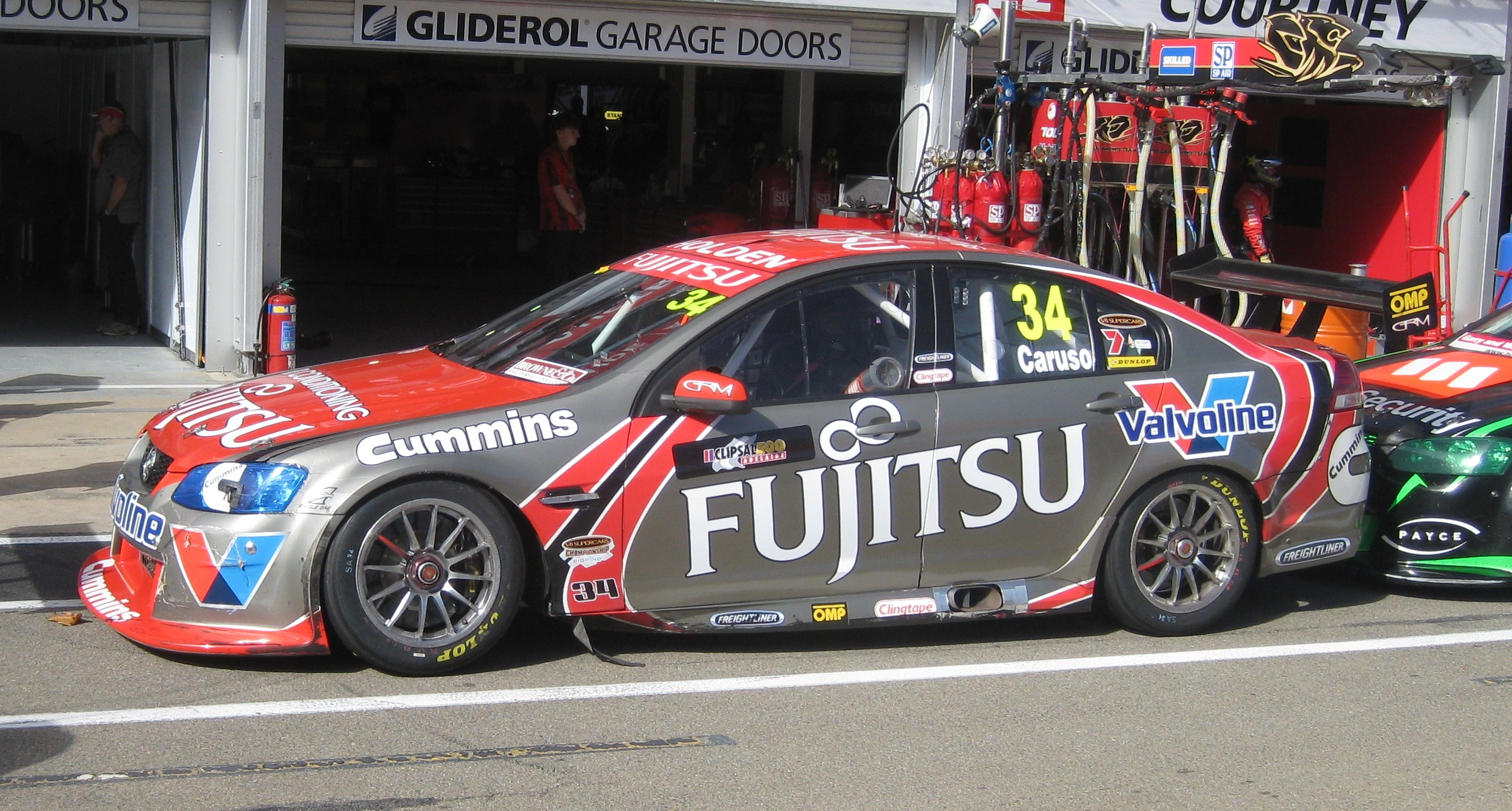
The Holden VE Commodore of Michael Caruso at the 2012 Clipsal 500 Adelaide

2010 saw the team's major sponsor change from Valvoline to Fujitsu with the livery changing in accordance, to red and white separated by black lines. The Clipsal 500 saw Holdsworth finish on the podium at the event for the third year in a row, Holdsworth taking third place on Sunday. The team came very close to winning the Bathurst 1000, with Holdsworth and Besnard leading the majority of the race. A drive-through penalty for speeding in pit lane with thirty laps to go meant that the pair would only finish in seventh place, while Caruso and Ritter finished tenth. Holdsworth won the final race of the year at the Sydney 500 after taking both pole positions for the event.

Holdsworth and Caruso remained with the team in 2011 for their fourth consecutive season at teammates. The team was only able to achieve three podium results, with Holdsworth finishing second at Hamilton and at Winton and third at the 2011 Gold Coast 600, driving with Frenchman Simon Pagenaud. Caruso achieved a best result of fourth at the Sydney 500. Holdsworth left the team to join Stone Brothers Racing in 2012 and he was replaced by French driver Alexandre Prémat, while Caruso entered his fifth season with the team. The team struggled to find pace during the year, with a best result of fourth for Caruso at Hidden Valley, while Prémat struggled for most of the season. Prémat showed good pace at the Sydney 500, however, before retiring from the Saturday race with heat exhaustion. He was unable to take part in the Sunday race and was replaced by Development Series champion Scott McLaughlin.

For 2013, McLaughlin was signed to drive for the team full-time alongside Prémat, with Caruso moving to Nissan Motorsport. Under the new New Generation V8 Supercar regulations, the team performed strongly at the start of the year with Prémat and McLaughlin finishing fourth and sixth respectively in the first race of the season at the Clipsal 500. McLaughlin went on to finish in the top ten in the first six races, becoming the youngest ever V8 Supercar race winner when he took victory at Pukekohe. However, his fortunes changed following this victory, only taking three top ten finishes in the next fifteen races. Queensland Raceway saw a return to form, with McLaughlin taking a second place and a victory. He was on track for another podium in the final race before a tyre failure dropped him down the field. Both cars finished in the top ten at the Sandown 500, with McLaughlin and Jack Perkins finishing eighth and Prémat and Greg Ritter finishing tenth. McLaughlin finished the year tenth in the points standings while Prémat finished in nineteenth.

==== Volvo ====
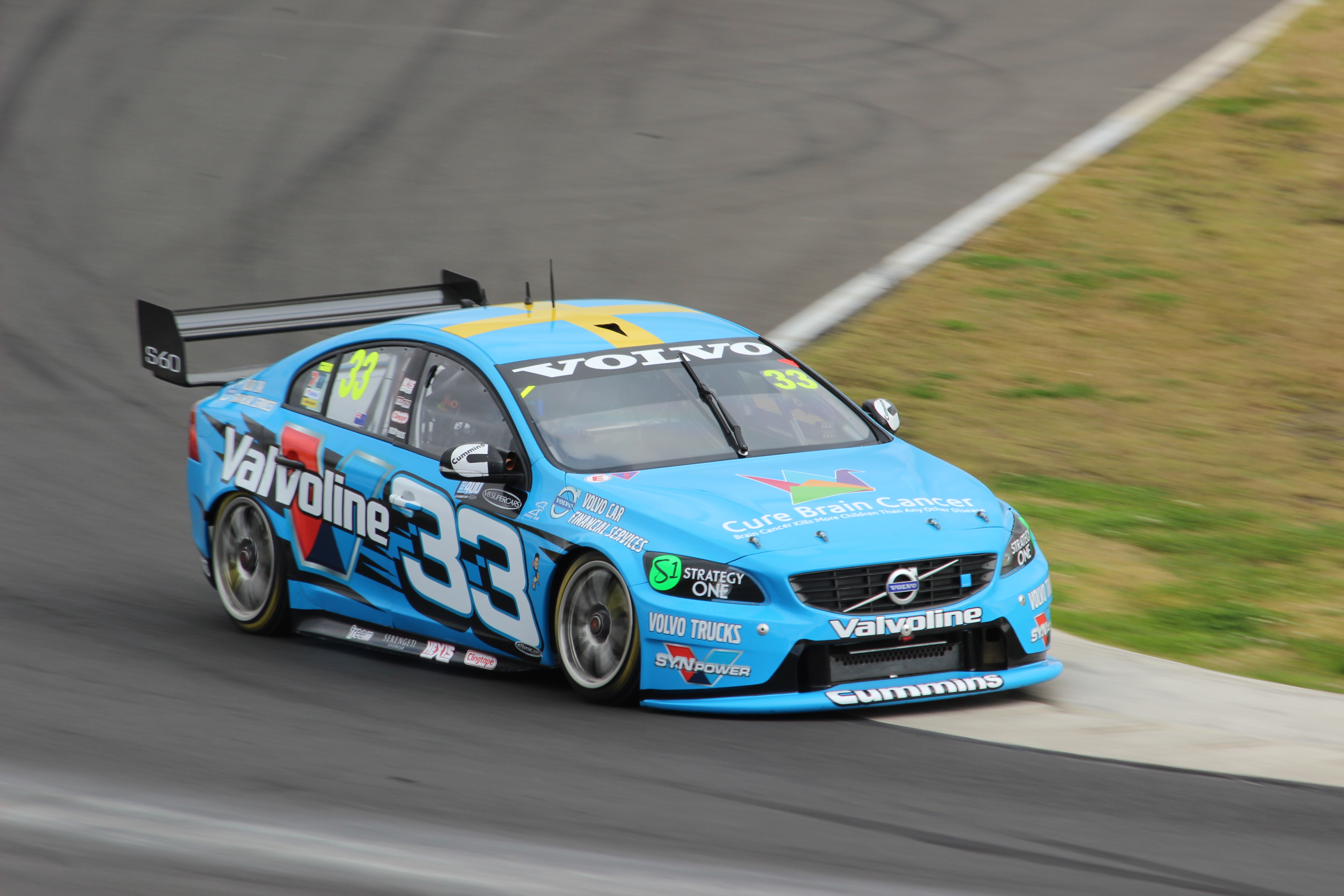
The Volvo S60 of Scott McLaughlin at the 2014 Sydney Motorsport Park 400.

In June 2013 it had been announced that the team would switch to running the Volvo S60 for the 2014 season, in a collaboration with Volvo Cars and Polestar Racing. As a result of the Swedish manufacturer's involvement, Prémat was dropped in favour of Swedish driver Robert Dahlgren. While Dahlgren largely struggled, McLaughlin achieved considerable success, winning four races and the 2014 Plus Fitness Phillip Island 400 event on the way to finishing fifth in the championship. In 2015, the second car was driven by David Wall and in 2016 by James Moffat. In 2015, Polestar was split in half and GRM no longer had an association with the Polestar brand as of 2016. In 2016 the team however did feature branding of Cyan Racing, the new name for the former racing arm of Polestar, and Volvo Dealer Racing. It was then announced that the team's association with Volvo would end at the conclusion of the 2016 season, with the cars and engines to be returned to Sweden. On track, after a winless 2015 the team returned to form at the 2016 WD-40 Phillip Island SuperSprint with McLaughlin winning both races over the weekend, and ultimately finishing 3rd in the drivers' championship.

==== Return to Holden ====
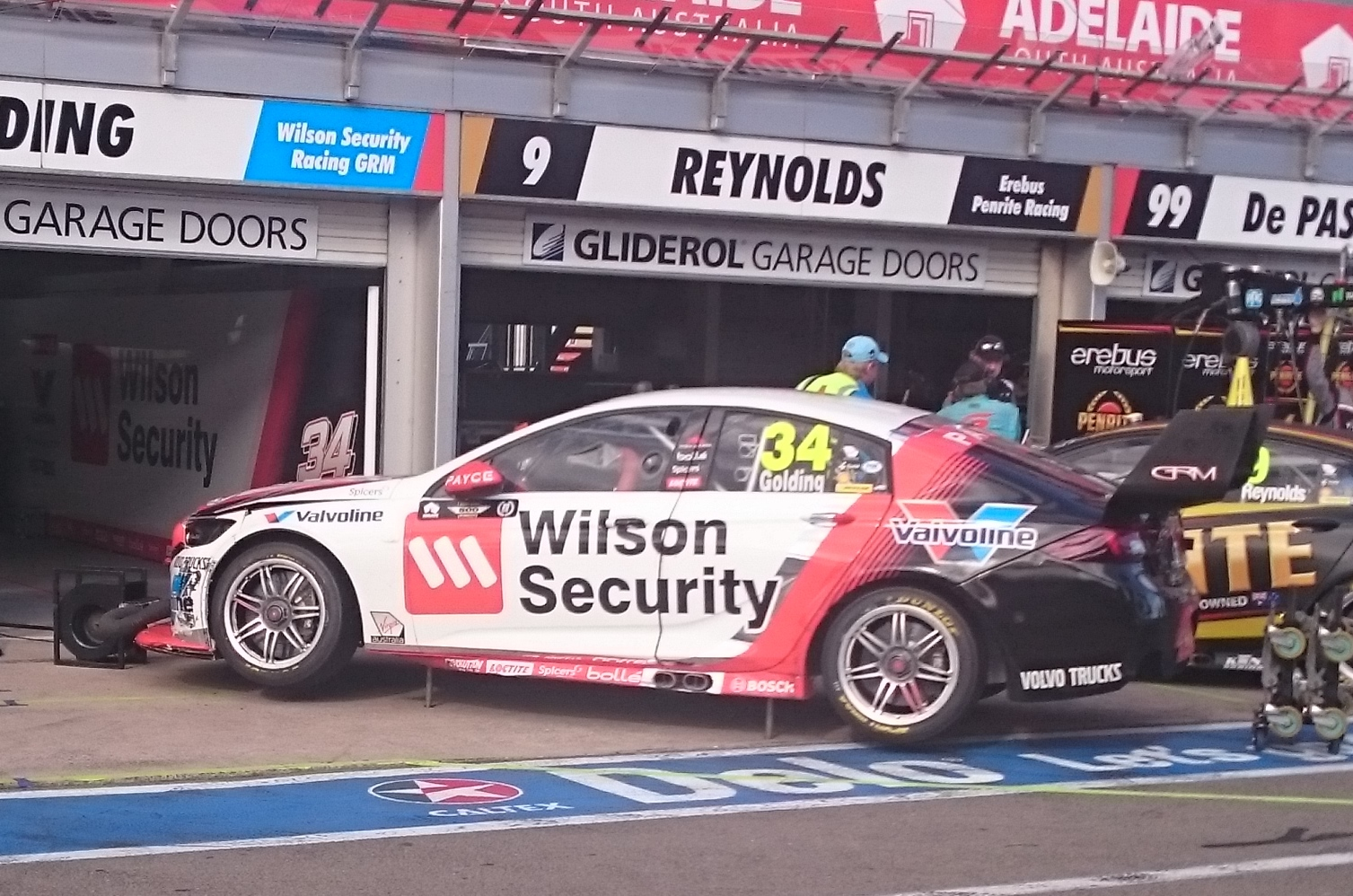
James Golding contested the 2018 Virgin Australia Supercars Championship for Garry Roger Motorsport driving a Holden Commodore ZB

In January 2017, it was announced that the team would return to running Holden Commodores, after Volvo withdrew from the series. Garth Tander, who was with the team from 1998 to 2004, returned to the team to replace Scott McLaughlin, who left the team to join DJR Team Penske. The team only scored a single podium at Phillip Island, with Tander, as well as adding James Golding as a wildcard throughout the year. Moffat left the team at the end of 2017 and was replaced by Golding. In 2018, they ran ZB Commodores, replacing the preceding VF Commodores. The team also scored a single podium at Melbourne, with Tander. At the end of the 2018 season, their main sponsor, Wilson Security, withdrew sponsorship and was replaced with Boost Mobile. Garth Tander was also dropped from the team and was replaced with Richie Stanaway. No podiums came from the team as Stanaway was forced to withdraw from the last race at Winton to Queensland Raceway, due to a pre-existing neck injury sustained in a Formula 3 accident years ago, with Chris Pither for Winton and Darwin while Michael Caruso made a one-off return to the team at Queensland Raceway.

==== Withdrawal from Supercars ====
In mid October 2019, Garry Rogers announced that they won't be returning to the Supercars grid for the 2020 season, citing escalating costs of competing and a model that required them to purchase parts rather than develop them as the reasons for his decision to withdraw from the series. At the end of the season, Richie Stanaway announced his retirement from motorsport only to return with Erebus Motorsport in 2022 and James Golding went to Charlie Schwerkolt's Team 18 as a Co-Driver for the Enduro Cup.

== Results ==
=== Car No. 33 results ===
Year	Driver	No.	Make	1	2	3	4	5	6	7	8	9	10	11	12	13	14	15	16	17	18	19	20	21	22	23	24	25	26	27	28	29	30	31	32	33	34	35	36	37	38	39	40	Position	Pts
2003	Glenn Seton	33	Holden	ADE; R1; 18	ADE; R1; 10	PHI; R3; 9	EAS; R4; 26	WIN; R5; 12	BAR; R6; 14	BAR; R7; 15	BAR; R8; 18	HDV; R9; Ret	HDV; R10; 16	HDV; R11; 17	QLD; R12; Ret	ORA; R13; Ret	SAN; R14; 16	BAT; R15; 2	SUR; R16; 12	SUR; R17; 5	PUK; R18; 11	PUK; R19; 9	PUK; R20; 11	EAS; R21; 18	EAS; R22; Ret																			15th	1266
2004	Glenn Seton	33	Holden	ADE; R1; 10	ADE; R2; Ret	EAS; R3; 15	PUK; R4; 29	PUK; R5; 21	PUK; R6; 22	HDV; R7; 18	HDV; R8; 12	HDV; R9; 14	BAR; R10; Ret	BAR; R11; 21	BAR; R12; Ret	QLD; R13; 13	WIN; R14; 10	ORA; R15; DNS	ORA; R16; 21	SAN; R17; 18	BAT; R18; 2	SUR; R19; 15	SUR; R20; 19	SYM; R21; 28	SYM; R22; 19	SYM; R23; 17	EAS; R24; 14	EAS; R25; 13	EAS; R26; 22															15th	1237
2006	Lee Holdsworth	33	Holden	ADE; R1; 18	ADE; R2; 24	PUK; R3; 19	PUK; R4; 16	PUK; R5; 16	BAR; R6; 24	BAR; R7; 12	BAR; R8; 24	WIN; R9; 16	WIN; R10; 16	WIN; R11; 12	HDV; R12; 28	HDV; R13; 20	HDV; R14; 19	QLD; R15; 18	QLD; R16; Ret	QLD; R17; 20	ORA; R18; 25	ORA; R19; 3	ORA; R20; 6	SAN; R21; 6	BAT; R22; 17	SUR; R23; 21	SUR; R24; 23	SUR; R25; Ret	SYM; R26; 22	SYM; R27; 24	SYM; R28; 22	BHR; R29; 15	BHR; R30; 14	BHR; R31; 26	PHI; R32; 18	PHI; R33; 11	PHI; R34; 21							20th	1811
2007	Lee Holdsworth	33	Holden	ADE; R1; 24	ADE; R2; 12	BAR; R3; 9	BAR; R4; 9	BAR; R5; 11	PUK; R6; 17	PUK; R7; 13	PUK; R8; 17	WIN; R9; 5	WIN; R10; Ret	WIN; R11; DNS	EAS; R12; 23	EAS; R13; 12	EAS; R14; Ret	HDV; R15; 14	HDV; R16; 17	HDV; R17; 10	QLD; R18; Ret	QLD; R19; 10	QLD; R20; 10	ORA; R21; 10	ORA; R22; 4	ORA; R23; 1	SAN; R24; 5	BAT; R25; Ret	SUR; R26; 12	SUR; R27; 27	SUR; R28; 14	BHR; R29; Ret	BHR; R30; 25	BHR; R31; 12	SYM; R32; Ret	SYM; R33; 13	SYM; R34; 12	PHI; R35; 11	PHI; R36; 10	PHI; R37; 11				15th	209
2008	Lee Holdsworth	33	Holden	ADE; R1; 4	ADE; R2; 2	EAS; R3; 8	EAS; R4; 8	EAS; R5; 11	HAM; R6; 5	HAM; R7; 4	HAM; R8; Ret	BAR; R29; 24	BAR; R10; Ret	BAR; R11; 23	SAN; R12; 11	SAN; R13; 22	SAN; R14; 8	HDV; R15; 13	HDV; R16; 17	HDV; R17; 16	QLD; R18; 10	QLD; R19; 18	QLD; R20; 10	WIN; R21; 18	WIN; R22; 7	WIN; R23; 3	PHI; Q 5	PHI; R24; 5	BAT; R25; Ret	SUR; R26; 10	SUR; R27; 4	SUR; R28; 17	BHR; R29; 3	BHR; R30; 12	BHR; R31; 8	SYM; R32; 10	SYM; R33; 7	SYM; R34; 9	ORA; R35; 12	ORA; R36; 25	ORA; R37; 6			11th	2065
2009	Lee Holdsworth	33	Holden	ADE; R1; 2	ADE; R2; 5	HAM; R3; 3	HAM; R4; 4	WIN; R5; 23	WIN; R6; Ret	SYM; R7; 10	SYM; R8; 5	HDV; R9; 10	HDV; R10; 7	TOW; R11; Ret	TOW; R12; 7	SAN; R13; 18	SAN; R14; 11	QLD; R15; 7	QLD; R16; 16	PHI; Q 18	PHI; R17; Ret	BAT; R18; 3	SUR; R19; Ret	SUR; R20; 14	SUR; R21; 22	SUR; R22; 12	PHI; R23; 7	PHI; R24; 13	BAR; R25; 12	BAR; R26; Ret	SYD; R27; 4	SYD; R28; Ret												10th	2006
2010	Lee Holdsworth	33	Holden	YMC; R1; 5	YMC; R2; 7	BHR; R3; 12	BHR; R4; 5	ADE; R5; 3	ADE; R6; 11	HAM; R7; 10	HAM; R8; 4	QLD; R9; 7	QLD; R10; 23	WIN; R11; 10	WIN; R12; 3	HDV; R13; 22	HDV; R14; 12	TOW; R15; 4	TOW; R16; 15	PHI; Q 11	PHI; R17; Ret	BAT; R18; 7	SUR; R19; 19	SUR; R20; 9	SYM; R21; 10	SYM; R22; 10	SAN; R23; 6	SAN; R24; 4	SYD; R25; 7	SYD; R26; 1														7th	2387
2011	Lee Holdsworth	33	Holden	YMC; R1; 9	YMC; R2; 22	ADE; R3; 20	ADE; R4; Ret	HAM; R5; 22	HAM; R6; 2	BAR; R7; 16	BAR; R8; 9	BAR; R9; 18	WIN; R10; 2	WIN; R11; 15	HID; R12; 4	HID; R13; 15	TOW; R14; 6	TOW; R15; 6	QLD; R16; 7	QLD; R17; 11	QLD; R18; 18	PHI; Q 11	PHI; R19; 12	BAT; R20; 17	SUR; R21; 10	SUR; R22; 3	SYM; R23; 16	SYM; R24; 13	SAN; R25; 17	SAN; R26; 8	SYD; R27; 14	SYD; R28; Ret												8th	1920
2012	Alex Premat	33	Holden	ADE; R1; 17	ADE; R2; 18	SYM; R3; 17	SYM; R4; 13	HAM; R5; Ret	HAM; R6; 24	BAR; R7; 17	BAR; R8; 28	BAR; R9; 24	PHI; R10; Ret	PHI; R11; 22	HID; R12; 22	HID; R13; 20	TOW; R14; Ret	TOW; R15; 16	QLD; R16; 19	QLD; R17; 23	SMP; R18; 28	SMP; R19; 27	SAN; Q 23	SAN; R20; 19	BAT; R21; 16	SUR; R22	SUR; R23	YMC; R24; 20	YMC; R25; 25	YMC; R26; 14	WIN; R27; 18	WIN; R28; 21	SYD; R29; Ret	SYD; R30; DNS										27th	942
2013	Scott McLaughlin	33	Holden	ADE; R1; 6	ADE; R2; 9	SYM; R3; 8	SYM; R4; 8	SYM; R5; 8	PUK; R6; 1	PUK; R7; 24	PUK; R8; Ret	PUK; R9; DNS	BAR; R10; 12	BAR; R11; 14	BAR; R12; 13	COA; R13; 28	COA; R14; 7	COA; R15; 11	COA; R16; 27	HID; R17; 11	HID; R18; 27	HID; R19; 8	TOW; R20; 14	TOW; R21; 9	QLD; R22; 2	QLD; R23; 1	QLD; R24; 20	WIN; R25; 19	WIN; R26; 9	WIN; R27; 14	SAN; Q 9	SAN; R28; 8	BAT; R29; 8	SUR; R30; 22	SUR; R31; 23	PHI; R32; 19	PHI; R33; 19	PHI; R34; 11	SYD; R35; Ret	SYD; R36; 12				10th	1934
2014	Scott McLaughlin	33	Volvo	ADE; R1; 7	ADE; R2; 2	ADE; R3; Ret	SYM; R4; 5	SYM; R5; 4	SYM; R6; 6	WIN; R7; Ret	WIN; R8; 25	WIN; R9; 16	PUK; R10; 8	PUK; R11; 6	PUK; R12; 3	PUK; R13; 2	BAR; R14; 1	BAR; R15; 4	BAR; R16; 17	HID; R17; 4	HID; R18; 5	HID; R19; 8	TOW; R20; 6	TOW; R21; 14	TOW; R22; 9	QLD; R23; 3	QLD; R24; 19	QLD; R25; 19	SMP; R26; Ret	SMP; R27; Ret	SMP; R28; 1	SAN; Q 4	SAN; R29; 8	BAT; R30; 17	SUR; R31; 7	SUR; R32; 2	PHI; R33; 1	PHI; R34; 6	PHI; R35; 1	SYD; R36; 4	SYD; R37; 3	SYD; R38; 8		5th	2509
2015	Scott McLaughlin	33	Volvo	ADE; R1; DNS	ADE; R2; 9	ADE; R3; 18	SYM; R4; Ret	SYM; R5; 9	SYM; R6; 7	BAR; R7; 11	BAR; R8; Ret	BAR; R9; 18	WIN; R10; 25	WIN; R11; 9	WIN; R12; 9	HID; R13; Ret	HID; R14; 9	HID; R15; 11	TOW; R16; 4	TOW; R17; Ret	QLD; R18; 2	QLD; R19; 9	QLD; R20; 13	SMP; R21; 8	SMP; R22; 4	SMP; R23; 5	SAN; Q 16	SAN; R24; 14	BAT; R25; 5	SUR; R26; 21	SUR; R27; 6	PUK; R28; 9	PUK; R29; 3	PUK; R30; 6	PHI; R31; 3	PHI; R32; 2	PHI; R33; 2	SYD; R34; 8	SYD; R35; 5	SYD; R36; 19				8th	2205
2016	Scott McLaughlin	33	Volvo	ADE; R1; 4	ADE; R2; 4	ADE; R3; 12	SYM; R4; 26	SYM; R5; 4	PHI; R6; 1	PHI; R7; 1	BAR; R8; 11	BAR; R9; 2	WIN; R10; 2	WIN; R11; 11	HID; R12; 10	HID; R13; 7	TOW; R14; 24	TOW; R15; 5	QLD; R16; 15	QLD; R17; 6	SMP; R18; 5	SMP; R19; 6	SAN; Q 3	SAN; R20; 4	BAT; R21; 15	SUR; R22; 2	SUR; R23; 3	PUK; R24; 3	PUK; R25; 7	PUK; R26; 7	PUK; R27; 3	SYD; R28; 4	SYD; R29; 5											3rd	2806
2017	Garth Tander	33	Holden	ADE; R1; 15	ADE; R2; 14	SYM; R3; 7	SYM; R4; 13	PHI; R5; 8	PHI; R6; 2	BAR; R7; 5	BAR; R8; 4	WIN; R9; 9	WIN; R10; 13	HID; R11; 14	HID; R12; 14	TOW; R13; 3	TOW; R14; 4	QLD; R15; 9	QLD; R16; 10	SMP; R17; 4	SMP; R18; 19	SAN; QR; 9	SAN; R19; 9	BAT; R20; Ret	SUR; R21; 8	SUR; R22; 5	PUK; R23; 2	PUK; R24; 19	NEW; R25; 17	NEW; R26; 7														6th	2208
2018	Garth Tander	33	Holden	ADE; R1; 5	ADE; R2; 13	MEL; R3; 14	MEL; R4; 9	MEL; R5; 7	MEL; R6; 17	SYM; R7; 14	SYM; R8; 12	PHI; R9; 13	PHI; R10; 15	BAR; R11; 2	BAR; R12; 21	WIN; R13; 10	WIN; R14; 20	HID; R15; 20	HID; R16; 13	TOW; R17; 6	TOW; R18; 12	QLD; R19; 20	QLD; R20; 26	SMP; R21; 15	BEN; R22; 5	BEN; R23; 16	SAN; QR; 5	SAN; R24; 17	BAT; R25; 12	SUR; R26; 7	SUR; R27; C	PUK; R28; 13	PUK; R29; 9	NEW; R30; 6	NEW; R31; 13									12th	2192
2019	Richie Stanaway	33	Holden	ADE; R1; 21	ADE; R2; 11	MEL; R3; 9	MEL; R4; 12	MEL; R5; 12	MEL; R6; 9	SYM; R7; 13	SYM; R8; 9	PHI; R9; 15	PHI; R10; 14	BAR; R11; 9	BAR; R12; 9	WIN; R13; 22	WIN; R14; 5	HID; R15; 6	HID; R16; 7	TOW; R17; 10	TOW; R18; 8	QLD; R19; 7	QLD; R20; 14	BEN; R21; 13	BEN; R22; 9	PUK; R23; 5	PUK; R24; 15	BAT; R25; 9	SUR; R26; 6	SUR; R27; 6	SAN; QR; 7	SAN; R28; 3	NEW; R29; 12	NEW; R30; 23										10th	2428
2020	Tyler Everingham	33	Holden	ADE; R1	ADE; R2	MEL; R3	MEL; R4	MEL; R5	MEL; R6	SMP1; R7	SMP1; R8	SMP1; R9	SMP2; R10	SMP2; R11	SMP2; R12	HID1; R13	HID1; R14	HID1; R15	HID2; R16	HID2; R17	HID2; R18	TOW1; R19	TOW1; R20	TOW1; R21	TOW2; R22	TOW2; R23	TOW2; R24	BEN1; R25	BEN1; R26	BEN1; R27	BEN2; R28	BEN2; R29	BEN2; R30	BAT; R31; 19										44th	96

=== Car No. 34 results ===
Year	Driver	No.	Make	1	2	3	4	5	6	7	8	9	10	11	12	13	14	15	16	17	18	19	20	21	22	23	24	25	26	27	28	29	30	31	32	33	34	35	36	37	38	39	40	Position	Pts
2003	Craig Lowndes	6	Ford	ADE; R1; Ret	ADE; R1; 7	PHI; R3; 1	EAS; R4; 2	WIN; R5; 10	BAR; R6; 6	BAR; R7; Ret	BAR; R8; 17	HDV; R9; 28	HDV; R10; 27	HDV; R11; 15	QLD; R12; 6	ORA; R13; 2	SAN; R14; 16	BAT; R15; 2	SUR; R16; 15	SUR; R17; 9	PUK; R18; 16	PUK; R19; 12	PUK; R20; 18	EAS; R21; 6	EAS; R22; 4																			5th	1756
2004	Craig Lowndes	6	Ford	ADE; R1; Ret	ADE; R2; Ret	EAS; R3; 2	PUK; R4; 8	PUK; R5; 29	PUK; R6; Ret	HDV; R7; 12	HDV; R8; 5	HDV; R9; 9	BAR; R10; 21	BAR; R11; Ret	BAR; R12; DNS	QLD; R13; Ret	WIN; R14; 27	ORA; R15; 19	ORA; R16; 26	SAN; R17; 18	BAT; R18; 2	SUR; R19; 4	SUR; R20; Ret	SYM; R21; 6	SYM; R22; 6	SYM; R23; 13	EAS; R24; 2	EAS; R25; 3	EAS; R26; Ret															20th	1182
2005	Jason Bright	6	Ford	ADE; R1; 19	ADE; R2; 11	PUK; R3; 7	PUK; R4; 11	PUK; R5; 7	BAR; R6; 16	BAR; R7; 7	BAR; R8; 22	EAS; R9; 33	EAS; R10; 23	SHA; R11; 7	SHA; R12; 20	SHA; R13; 6	HDV; R14; Ret	HDV; R15; 9	HDV; R16; 8	QLD; R17; 9	ORA; R18; 7	ORA; R19; 7	SAN; R20; 6	BAT; R21; 14	SUR; R22; 8	SUR; R23; 9	SUR; R24; 9	SYM; R25; 7	SYM; R26; 17	SYM; R27; 16	PHI; R28; 31	PHI; R29; 13	PHI; R30; 7											9th	1566
2006	Jason Bright	6	Ford	ADE; R1; 25	ADE; R2; 15	PUK; R3; 3	PUK; R4; 20	PUK; R5; 20	BAR; R6; 5	BAR; R7; Ret	BAR; R8; 28	WIN; R9; 1	WIN; R10; 20	WIN; R11; 2	HDV; R12; 24	HDV; R13; 1	HDV; R14; 4	QLD; R15; 2	QLD; R16; 8	QLD; R17; 3	ORA; R18; 4	ORA; R19; 18	ORA; R20; Ret	SAN; R21; 1	BAT; R22; Ret	SUR; R23; 7	SUR; R24; 6	SUR; R25; 4	SYM; R26; 1	SYM; R27; 3	SYM; R28; 2	BHR; R29; 1	BHR; R30; 2	BHR; R31; 2	PHI; R32; 10	PHI; R33; 8	PHI; R34; 4							5th	2868
2007	Steven Richards	6	Ford	ADE; R1; 11	ADE; R2; 8	BAR; R3; 22	BAR; R4; 13	BAR; R5; 9	PUK; R6; 5	PUK; R7; 18	PUK; R8; 12	WIN; R9; 2	WIN; R10; 16	WIN; R11; 12	EAS; R12; 6	EAS; R13; 6	EAS; R14; 7	HDV; R15; 7	HDV; R16; 9	HDV; R17; 8	QLD; R18; 13	QLD; R19; Ret	QLD; R20; Ret	ORA; R21; 5	ORA; R22; 6	ORA; R23; 5	SAN; R24; 3	BAT; R25; 10	SUR; R26; Ret	SUR; R27; 5	SUR; R28; 1	BHR; R29; 25	BHR; R30; 6	BHR; R31; 25	SYM; R32; 4	SYM; R33; 2	SYM; R34; 2	PHI; R35; 27	PHI; R36; 12	PHI; R37; 9				7th	380
2008	Steven Richards	6	Ford	ADE; R1	ADE; R2	EAS; R3	EAS; R4	EAS; R5	HAM; R6	HAM; R7	HAM; R8	BAR; R9	BAR; R10	BAR; R11	SAN; R12	SAN; R13	SAN; R14	HDV; R15	HDV; R16	HDV; R17	QLD; R18	QLD; R19	QLD; R20	WIN; R21	WIN; R22	WIN; R23	PHI; Q	PHI; R24	BAT; R25	SUR; R26	SUR; R27	SUR; R28	BHR; R29	BHR; R30	BHR; R31	SYM; R32	SYM; R33	SYM; R34	ORA; R35	ORA; R36	ORA; R37			8th	2416
2009	Steven Richards	6	Ford	ADE; R1; Ret	ADE; R2; 9	HAM; R3; 15	HAM; R4; 12	WIN; R5; 3	WIN; R6; 16	SYM; R7; 15	SYM; R8; 15	HDV; R9; 21	HDV; R10; 14	TOW; R11; 21	TOW; R12; 20	SAN; R13; 14	SAN; R14; 12	QLD; R15; 11	QLD; R16; 7	PHI; Q 1	PHI; R17; 3	BAT; R18; Ret	SUR; R19; 7	SUR; R20; 6	SUR; R21; 12	SUR; R22; Ret	PHI; R23; 17	PHI; R24; 14	BAR; R25; 23	BAR; R26; 8	SYD; R27; 8	SYD; R28; 15												13th	1780
2010	Steven Richards	6	Ford	YMC; R1; 16	YMC; R2; 17	BHR; R3; Ret	BHR; R4; 15	ADE; R5; 17	ADE; R6; 13	HAM; R7; 24	HAM; R8; DSQ	QLD; R9; 27	QLD; R10; 9	WIN; R11; 14	WIN; R12; 21	HDV; R13; Ret	HDV; R14; 10	TOW; R15; 9	TOW; R16; 5	PHI; R17; 21	BAT; R18; 11	SUR; R19; Ret	SUR; R20; 13	SYM; R21; 8	SYM; R22; 9	SAN; R23; 12	SAN; R24; 15	SYD; R25; 11	SYD; R26; 2															15th	1630
2011	Will Davison	6	Ford	YMC; R1; 12	YMC; R2; 16	ADE; R3; 9	ADE; R4; 7	HAM; R5; 6	HAM; R6; 4	BAR; R7; 3	BAR; R8; 8	BAR; R9; 15	WIN; R10; 13	WIN; R11; 24	HID; R12; 5	HID; R13; 7	TOW; R14; 3	TOW; R15; 18	QLD; R16; 15	QLD; R17; 15	QLD; R18; 21	PHI; Q 1	PHI; R19; 3	BAT; R20; 18	SUR; R21; 2	SUR; R22; 14	SYM; R23; 5	SYM; R24; 2	SAN; R25; 4	SAN; R26; 3	SYD; R27; Ret	SYD; R28; Ret												7th	2345
2012	Will Davison	6	Ford	ADE; R1; 2	ADE; R2; 1	SYM; R3; 1	SYM; R4; 3	HAM; R5; 1	HAM; R6; 3	BAR; R7; 25	BAR; R8; 1	BAR; R9; 1	PHI; R10; Ret	PHI; R11; 1	HID; R12; 2	HID; R13; 6	TOW; R14; 12	TOW; R15; 3	QLD; R16; 6	QLD; R17; 4	SMP; R18; 3	SMP; R19; 5	SAN; Q 27	SAN; R20; 17	BAT; R21; 24	SUR; R22; 18	SUR; R23; 1	YMC; R24; 2	YMC; R25; 2	YMC; R26; 2	WIN; R27; Ret	WIN; R28; 11	SYD; R29; 19	SYD; R30; 1										4th	3049
2013	Will Davison	6	Ford	ADE; R1; 2	ADE; R2; 6	SYM; R3; 6	SYM; R4; 5	SYM; R5; 6	PUK; R6; 7	PUK; R7; 2	PUK; R8; 1	PUK; R9; 5	BAR; R10; 14	BAR; R11; 5	BAR; R12; 4	COA; R13; 4	COA; R14; 9	COA; R15; 12	COA; R16; Ret	HID; R17; Ret	HID; R18; 4	HID; R19; 7	TOW; R20; 1	TOW; R21; 10	QLD; R22; 6	QLD; R23; 9	QLD; R24; 2	WIN; R25; 6	WIN; R26; 7	WIN; R27; 6	SAN; QR; 1	SAN; R28; 3	BAT; R29; 7	SUR; R30; 6	SUR; R31; 9	PHI; R32; 17	PHI; R33; 8	PHI; R34; 6	SYD; R35; 5	SYD; R36; 7				3rd	2799
2014	Chaz Mostert	6	Ford	ADE; R1; Ret	ADE; R2; 6	ADE; R3; Ret	SYM; R4; 13	SYM; R5; 18	SYM; R6; 14	WIN; R7; 12	WIN; R8; 10	WIN; R9; 6	PUK; R10; 21	PUK; R11; 3	PUK; R12; 16	PUK; R13; 3	BAR; R14; 3	BAR; R15; 6	BAR; R16; 1	HID; R17; 14	HID; R18; 14	HID; R19; 15	TOW; R20; 13	TOW; R21; 5	TOW; R22; 7	QLD; R23; 14	QLD; R24; 3	QLD; R25; 3	SMP; R26; 13	SMP; R27; 2	SMP; R28; 10	SAN; QR; 17	SAN; R29; 7	BAT; R30; 1	SUR; R31; 6	SUR; R32; 17	PHI; R33; 14	PHI; R34; 9	PHI; R35; 16	SYD; R36; 15	SYD; R37; 15	SYD; R38; 5		7th	2451
2015	Chaz Mostert	6	Ford	ADE; R1; 2	ADE; R2; Ret	ADE; R3; Ret	SYM; R4; 5	SYM; R5; 12	SYM; R6; 2	BAR; R7; 2	BAR; R8; 4	BAR; R9; 4	WIN; R10; 1	WIN; R11; 3	WIN; R12; 25	HID; R13; 1	HID; R14; 3	HID; R15; 2	TOW; R16; 8	TOW; R17; 6	QLD; R18; 5	QLD; R19; 3	QLD; R20; 1	SMP; R21; 1	SMP; R22; 3	SMP; R23; 1	SAN; QR; 3	SAN; R24; 2	BAT; R25; DNS	SUR; R26	SUR; R27	PUK; R28	PUK; R29	PUK; R30	PHI; R31	PHI; R32	PHI; R33	SYD; R34	SYD; R35	SYD; R36				11th	2017
2015	Cameron Waters	6	Ford	ADE; R1	ADE; R2	ADE; R3	SYM; R4	SYM; R5	SYM; R6	BAR; R7	BAR; R8	BAR; R9	WIN; R10	WIN; R11	WIN; R12	HID; R13	HID; R14	HID; R15	TOW; R16	TOW; R17	QLD; R18	QLD; R19	QLD; R20	SMP; R21	SMP; R22	SMP; R23	SAN; QR	SAN; R24	BAT; R25	SUR; R26; 17	SUR; R27; 19	PUK; R28; 17	PUK; R29; 12	PUK; R30; 22	PHI; R31; 9	PHI; R32; 15	PHI; R33; 20	SYD; R34	SYD; R35	SYD; R36				32nd	595
2015	Steve Owen	6	Ford	ADE; R1	ADE; R2	ADE; R3	SYM; R4	SYM; R5	SYM; R6	BAR; R7	BAR; R8	BAR; R9	WIN; R10	WIN; R11	WIN; R12	HID; R13	HID; R14	HID; R15	TOW; R16	TOW; R17	QLD; R18	QLD; R19	QLD; R20	SMP; R21	SMP; R22	SMP; R23	SAN; QR	SAN; R24	BAT; R25	SUR; R26	SUR; R27	PUK; R28	PUK; R29	PUK; R30	PHI; R31	PHI; R32	PHI; R33	SYD; R34; 20	SYD; R35; Ret	SYD; R36; Ret				29th	706
2016	Cameron Waters	6	Ford	ADE; R1; 15	ADE; R2; 12	ADE; R3; 4	SYM; R4; 7	SYM; R5; Ret	PHI; R6; 18	PHI; R7; 23	BAR; R8; 13	BAR; R9; 26	WIN; R10; 16	WIN; R11; 5	HID; R12; 24	HID; R13; 22	TOW; R14; 16	TOW; R15; 6	QLD; R16; Ret	QLD; R17; 16	SMP; R18; 20	SMP; R19; 16	SAN; QR; 26	SAN; R20; Ret	BAT; R21; 4	SUR; R22; Ret	SUR; R23; 14	PUK; R24; 12	PUK; R25; 17	PUK; R26; 20	PUK; R27; 17	SYD; R28; 21	SYD; R29; Ret											19th	1423
2017	Cameron Waters	6	Ford	ADE; R1; 4	ADE; R2; 8	SYM; R3; 10	SYM; R4; 6	PHI; R5; 19	PHI; R6; 6	BAR; R7; 19	BAR; R8; 12	WIN; R9; 22	WIN; R10; 4	HID; R11; 6	HID; R12; 9	TOW; R13; 5	TOW; R14; 14	QLD; R15; 16	QLD; R16; 8	SMP; R17; 17	SMP; R18; Ret	SAN; QR; 1	SAN; R19; 1	BAT; R20; 16	SUR; R21; 2	SUR; R22; 21	PUK; R23; 9	PUK; R24; 3	NEW; R25; 13	NEW; R26; 23														8th	2173
2018	Cameron Waters	6	Ford	ADE; R1; 16	ADE; R2; 5	MEL; R3; 11	MEL; R4; 5	MEL; R5; 9	MEL; R6; 22	SYM; R7; 20	SYM; R8; 13	PHI; R9; 16	PHI; R10; 17	BAR; R11; 6	BAR; R12; 13	WIN; R13; Ret	WIN; R14; 26	HID; R15; 12	HID; R16; 25	TOW; R17; 8	TOW; R18; 9	QLD; R19; 22	QLD; R20; 17	SMP; R21; 19	BEN; R22; 13	BEN; R23; 15	SAN; QR; 13	SAN; R24; 13	BAT; R25; 23	SUR; R26; 8	SUR; R27; C	PUK; R28; 7	PUK; R29; 12	NEW; R30; 14	NEW; R31; 14									16th	1873
2019	Cameron Waters	6	Ford	ADE; R1; 22	ADE; R2; 2	MEL; R3; 3	MEL; R4; 3	MEL; R5; DNS	MEL; R6; 4	SYM; R7; 11	SYM; R8; 11	PHI; R9; Ret	PHI; R10; 6	BAR; R11; 8	BAR; R12; 3	WIN; R13; 11	WIN; R14; 6	HID; R15; 4	HID; R16; 4	TOW; R17; 21	TOW; R18; 3	QLD; R19; 6	QLD; R20; 6	BEN; R21; 9	BEN; R22; 8	PUK; R23; 2	PUK; R24; 14	BAT; R25; 20	SUR; R26; 4	SUR; R27; 5	SAN; QR; 14	SAN; R28; 21	NEW; R29; 5	NEW; R30; 8										7th	2588
2020	Cameron Waters	6	Ford	ADE; R1; 6	ADE; R2; 3	MEL; R3; C	MEL; R4; C	MEL; R5; C	MEL; R6; C	SMP; R7; 6	SMP; R8; 6	SMP; R9; 13	SMP2; R10; 6	SMP2; R11; 9	SMP2; R12; 18	HID1; R13; 8	HID1; R14; 9	HID1; R15; 11	HID2; R16; 3	HID2; R17; 5	HID2; R18; Ret	TOW1; R19; 2	TOW1; R20; 4	TOW1; R21; 2	TOW2; R22; 2	TOW2; R23; 5	TOW2; R24; 12	BEN1; R25; 5	BEN1; R26; 8	BEN1; R27; 5	BEN2; R28; 3	BEN2; R29; 3	BEN2; R30; 1	BAT; R31; 2										2nd	2125

== TCR Australia ==
In 2019, the team entered into the TCR Australia Touring Car Series, entering in a single Alfa Romeo Giulietta Veloce and two Renault Mégane R.S'. Jimmy Vernon with withdrawn halfway through the series and was replaced with Jordan Cox for the remainder of the series. The team claimed seven podiums from Cox, James Moffat and Chris Pither. In 2020, Renault increased sponsorship with the team, to be renamed to Renault Sport GRM and add a third car into the main team, with James Moffat and Dylan O'Keeffe the confirmed drivers. They also increased their presence through the series as GRM Customer Racing, with an Alfa Romeo Giulietta Veloce and a Peuegot 308 driven by Jordan Cox and Jason Bargwanna respectively, and Team Valvoline GRM, who also runs with an Alfa Romeo Giulietta Veloce and a Peuegot 308 driven by Michael Caruso and Aaron Cameron respectively.

== Australian Touring Car Championship and Supercar drivers ==
The following is a list of drivers who have driven for the team in the Australian Touring Car Championship and Supercars, in order of their first appearance. Drivers who only drove for the team on a part-time basis are listed in italics.

- (New Zealand) Steven Richards (1996–98)
- (Australia) Jason Bright (1997)
- (Australia) Jason Bargwanna (1998–2002)
- (Australia) Garth Tander (1998–2004, 2017–18)
- (Australia) Cameron McLean (1998, 2006–07)
- (Australia) Greg Ritter (1999–2000, 2006–14)
- (Australia) Matthew Coleman (1999)
- (Australia) Steve Owen (1999)
- (Australia) Tim Leahey (2000)
- (Australia) Paul Dumbrell (2001)
- (Australia) Leanne Ferrier (2001)
- (Australia) Jamie Whincup (2002–03)
- (Australia) Max Dumesny (2002)
- (Australia) Mark Noske (2002)
- (Australia) Nathan Pretty (2003–04)
- (Denmark) Allen Simonsen (2003–04)
- (Australia) Cameron McConville (2004–05)
- (Australia) Andrew Jones (2005)
- (Australia) Dean Canto (2005–07)
- (Australia) Lee Holdsworth (2005–11)
- (Australia) Phillip Scifleet (2005–06)
- (Australia) Michael Caruso (2008–12, 2019)
- (Australia) Steven Ellery (2008)
- (Australia) David Besnard (2009–10)
- (United States) Patrick Long (2010)
- (Australia) Marcus Marshall (2011)
- (France) Simon Pagenaud (2011)
- (Brazil) Augusto Farfus (2011)
- (France) Alexandre Prémat (2012–15)
- (Australia) Jack Perkins (2012–13)
- (United States) Ricky Taylor (2012)
- (Canada) James Hinchcliffe (2012)
- (New Zealand) Scott McLaughlin (2012–16)
- (Sweden) Robert Dahlgren (2014)
- (Australia) David Wall (2015–16)
- (New Zealand) Chris Pither (2015, 2018–19)
- (Australia) James Moffat (2016–17, 2026)
- (Australia) James Golding (2016–19)
- (Australia) Richard Muscat (2017–19)
- (New Zealand) Richie Stanaway (2019)
- (Australia) Dylan O'Keeffe (2019)
- (Australia) Tyler Everingham (2020)
- (Australia) Jayden Ojeda (2020)
- (Australia) Nathan Herne (2026)

== Super2 drivers ==
The following is a list of drivers who have driven for the team in the Super2, in order of their first appearance. Drivers who only drove for the team on a part-time basis are listed in italics.

- (Australia) Leanne Ferrier (2001)
- (Australia) James Golding (2015–16)
- (Australia) Chelsea Angelo (2016)
- (Australia) Richard Muscat (2016–17)
- (Australia) Mason Barbera (2017–19)
- (New Zealand) Chris Pither (2018)
- (Australia) Dylan O'Keeffe (2019)

== TCR Australia drivers ==
The following is a list of drivers who have driven for the team in the TCR Australia, in order of their first appearance. Drivers who only drove for the team on a part-time basis are listed in italics.

- (Australia) Jimmy Vernon (2019)
- (Australia) Jordan Cox (2019–present)
- (New Zealand) Chris Pither (2019)
- (Australia) James Moffat (2019–present)
- (Australia) Michael Caruso (2021)
- (Australia) Aaron Cameron (2021–present)
- (Australia) Dylan O'Keeffe (2021)
- (Australia) Kody Garland (2022)

== Bathurst 24 Hour and Nations Cup ==
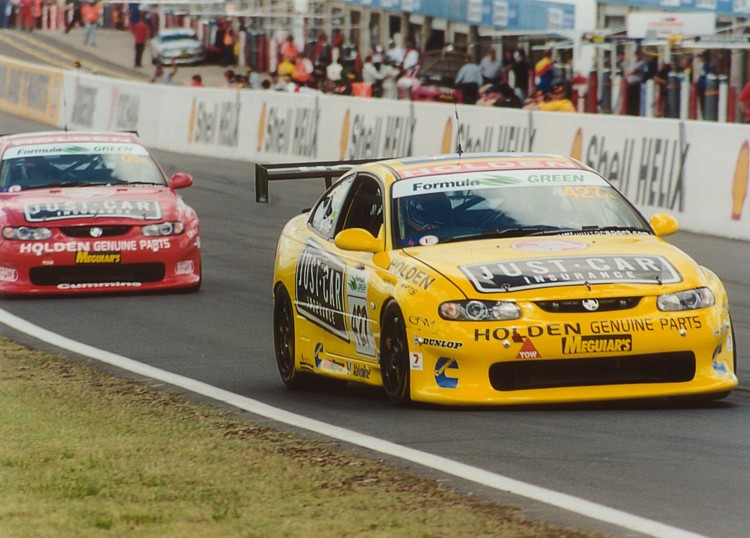
The GRM Monaro 427C at the 2003 Bathurst 24 Hour

In 2002 Holden Motorsport was looking at running a Holden Monaro in the Bathurst 24 Hour endurance sports car race against the likes of the Lamborghini Diablo GTR, Ferrari 360 N-GT, Chrysler Viper ACR and Porsche 911 GT3. After the Holden Racing Team reportedly turned down the job of building the Monaro, GRM accepted the job of building the car as well as running it. The car ran a GRM developed version of the Chevrolet Corvette C5-R's 7.0 litre (427 cui) motor which had taken numerous class wins in the 24 Hours of Le Mans. The GRM engines were built by the team's engine builder Mike Excel. The car became known as the Holden Monaro 427C.

In its race debut, the 2002 Bathurst 24 Hour, Tander qualified the bright yellow #427 car (nicknamed the "Nuclear banana") in second place behind the N-GT Ferrari F360 driven by Brad Jones. After taking the lead from the John Bowe driven Ferrari at the start, the car suffered an early flat tyre which dropped it to second behind the Cirtek Motorsport Porsche 911 GT3 of David Brabham, while the Ferrari had already suffered the first of two engine failures early on and was out of contention. Then, just a few hours into the race, the entire fuel cell of the Monaro needed to be replaced, dropping the car 13 laps behind the Porsche. The team overcame the fuel cell problem as well as the car becoming jammed between gears just before sunrise after Nathan Pretty was hit by the BMW 318i of Debbie Chapman in The Chase, which also caused damage to the driver's side door. The Monaro spun and stalled, jamming the gearbox, forcing Pretty to get out and rock the car back and forth to clear the problem, a task made difficult by the Monaro's Sequential transmission. By the 18-hour mark the GRM entry had clawed its way back to second place, only three laps behind the lead. The Porsche struck trouble with a broken half-shaft, causing the car to pit for four laps. The GRM Monaro re-took the lead, despite the Monaro pitting at the same time as the Porsche to replace rear suspension bolts that had broken away from the chassis. When the Porsche returned to the track, Allan Grice, told to drive as fast as possible, hit the wall on the top of the mountain while attempting to lap the Mosler MT900R driven by Mark Pashley which broke the Porsche's rear suspension and took it out of contention. Upon its return to the track Darren Palmer put the car into the wall at Griffin's Bend with no steering, a legacy of the Grice crash. The Monaro, driven by Tander, Pretty, Steven Richards and Cameron McConville, ran in the lead for the last five hours to win the race by 24 laps from the British entered Mosler of Martin Short. In the race, Tander's fastest race lap of 2:14.3267 was actually quicker than Brad Jones' pole time of 2:15.0742.

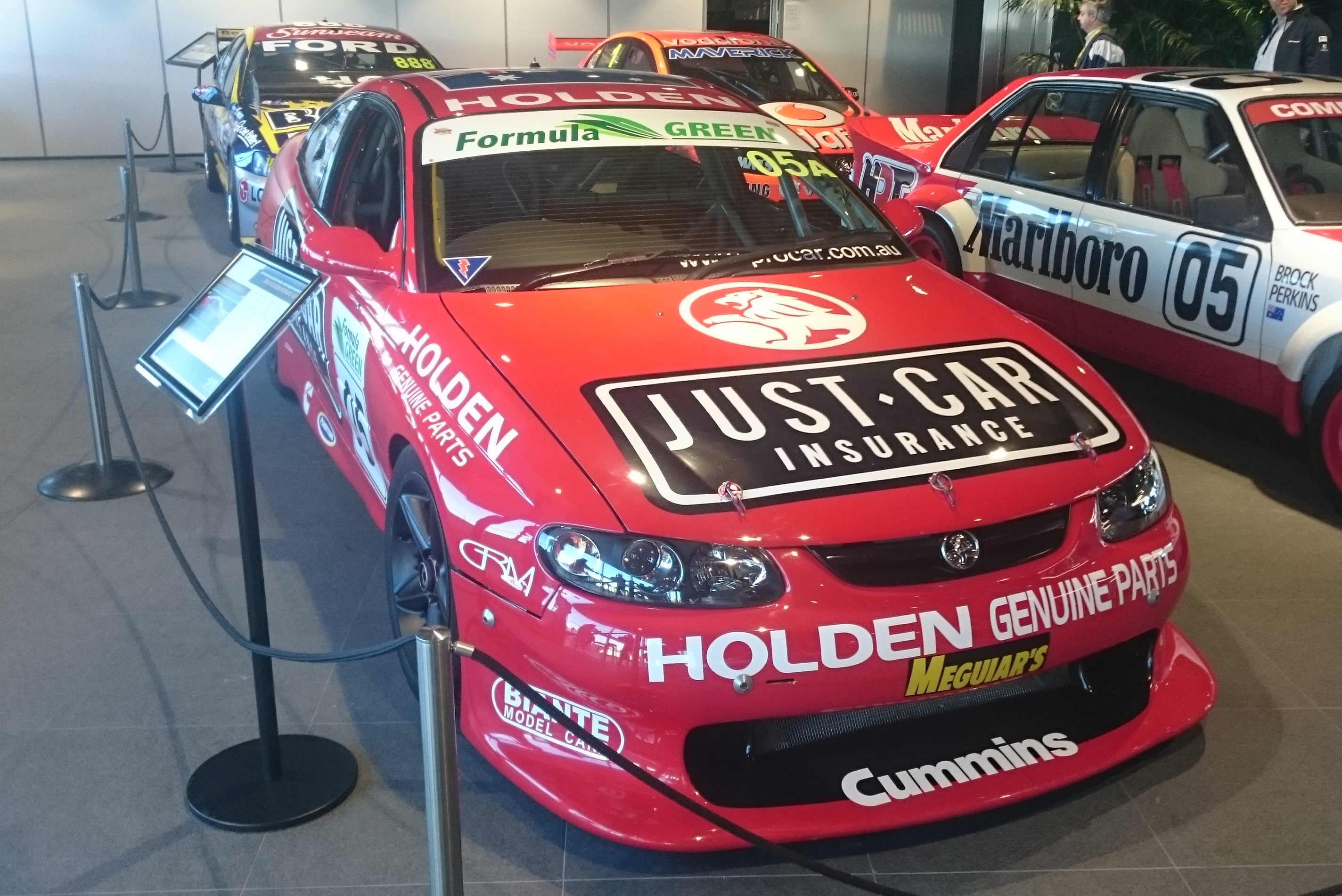
The 2003 Bathurst 24 Hour winning Holden Monaro

In 2003 GRM built a second car for the legendary touring car driver Peter Brock. It was this second car which won the 2003 Bathurst 24 Hour with Jason Bright, Todd Kelly and Greg Murphy sharing the driving with Brock. The winning car from 2002, driven by the same four drivers as the previous year, finished second, less than one second behind after 24 hours of racing. With seven minutes to go in the race, and with the two Monaros running nose to tail, Garry Rogers gave Murphy and Tander permission to race each other to the finish, with orders to respect the work put into the event by the team and not to take each other out. Tander was all over Murphy in the final four laps of the race and set the race's fastest lap of 2:14.489 with just three laps to go, while Murphy's corresponding lap time was a 2:14.499, which was his car's fastest lap of the race. Tander's last chance at snatching victory from Murphy with a last lap lunge into Murray's Corner was thwarted due to yellow flags on the last lap forcing him to stay behind and finish second. For Brock, the 2003 Bathurst 24 Hour would be his last win at Mount Panorama, and would be seen by some (including himself) as his tenth Bathurst win, despite the race not being the traditional Bathurst 1000 where he had scored his nine other wins dating back to 1972.

After the teams 1-2 finish in the 2003 Bathurst 24 Hour, Garry Rogers said in an interview with Australian Muscle Car (AMC) Magazine that with the restrictions that PROCAR forced the team to have on the 7.0 litre V8s, such as induction and rev limits, he believed the cars would actually have been faster using the smaller Gen III production based engine which would have been almost restriction free, as seen with the Mosler MT900R which used the 5.7 litre motor. He also refuted that having a professional team such as GRM made the car unbeatable at Bathurst, stating that had anyone built a V10 Viper to at least the same standards and had professional drivers like the Monaros instead of part-timers and gentlemen drivers, then "nobody would have seen which way they went", as during the Nations Cup Championship, Greg Crick's privately entered Viper had shown on a small budget that it was capable of beating the Monaros.

Ten years later, in a late 2013 interview with AMC to celebrate the tenth anniversary of the 2003 Bathurst 24 Hour and GRM's switch from Holden to Volvo in 2014, Rogers proclaimed that winning the two Bathurst 24 Hour races and finishing 1–2 in 2003 was the crowning achievement for his team during their 25 years running Holdens which spanned from 1988 until 2013. Former GRM driver and 2002 Bathurst 24 Hour winner Garth Tander also told in the article that while many people were surprised that the Monaros were five seconds slower around the Mount Panorama Circuit than the V8 Supercars were at the time, especially given that the Monaros ran the 7.0 litre engines while the V8 Supercars were restricted to 5.0 litre V8s, the Monaro weighed in at over 1,600 kilograms, nearly 300 kg heavier than a V8 Supercar. Tander also said that the top speed of the Monaros on Conrod Straight was only around 275 km/h (171 mph), compared to the V8s which were reaching just under 300 km/h (186 mph), though he did point out that the Monaros were two seconds faster from Griffin's Bend to McPhillamy Park.

The 2002 Bathurst 24 Hour race-winning Monaro currently resides at the National Motor Racing Museum, located at Mount Panorama in Bathurst. The 2003 Bathurst 24 Hour winner is currently owned by a historic car racing enthusiast, the third Monaro driven by James Brock was placed under auction on 20 February 2020.

== S5000 ==
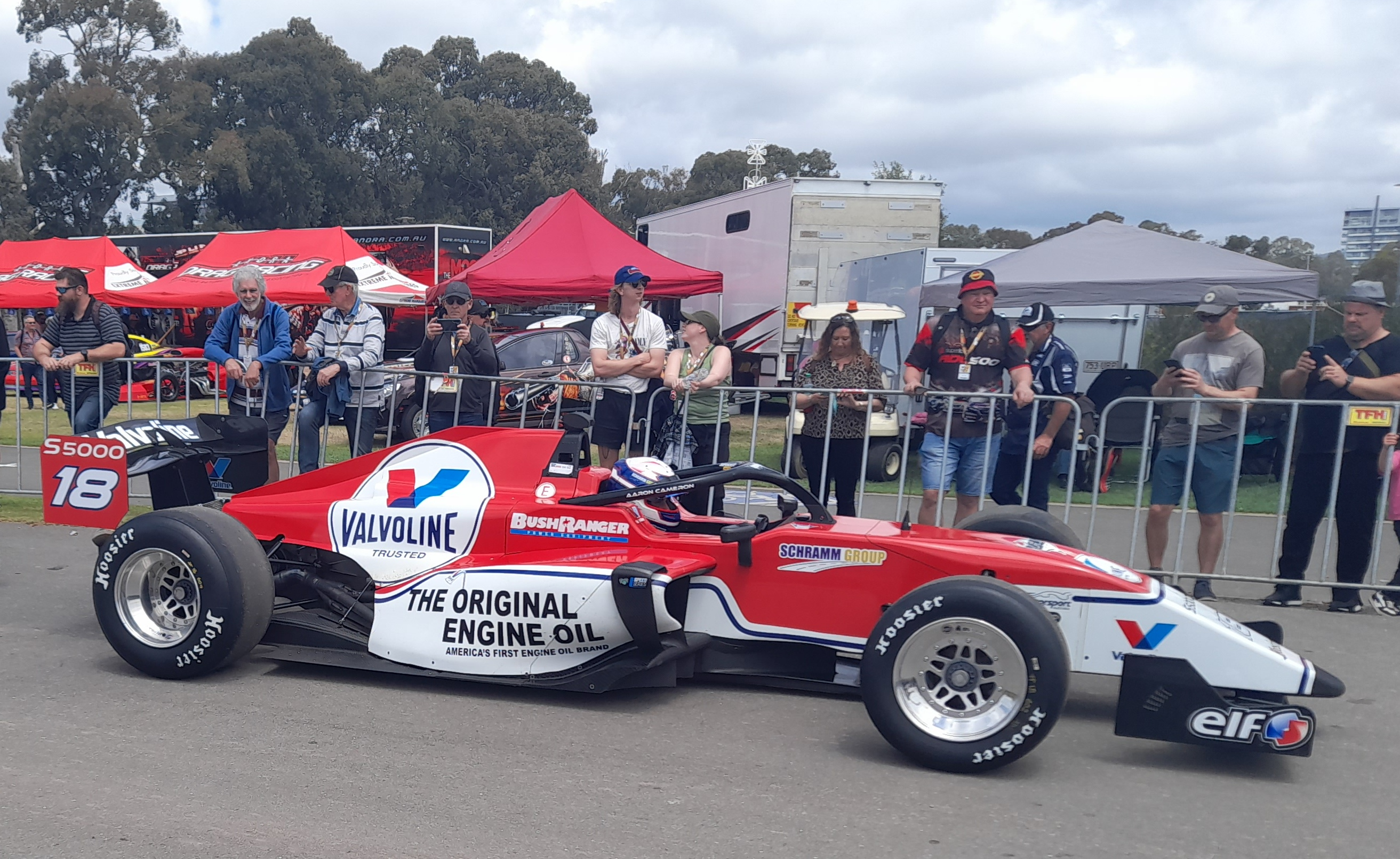
Aaron Cameron won the 2023 S5000 Australian Drivers' Championship driving for Garry Rogers Motorsport

Aaron Cameron won the 2023 S5000 Australian Drivers' Championship driving for Garry Rogers Motorsport.
