= 2019 TCR Australia Touring Car Series =

Motor racing series

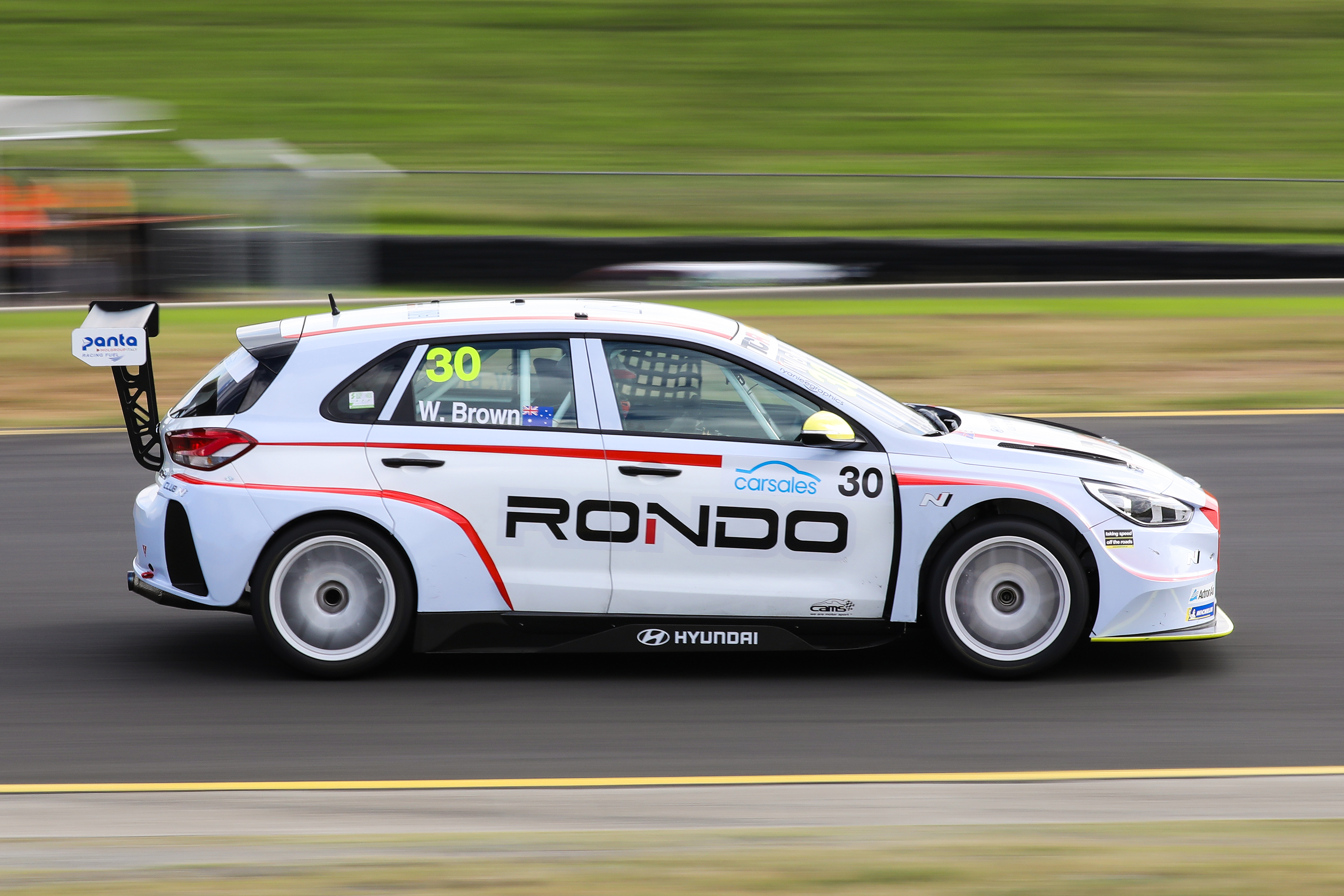
Will Brown is the TCR Australia Champion.

The 2019 TCR Australia Touring Car Series season is the first season of the TCR Australia Touring Car Series. The series is run as part of the Shannons Nationals series.

== Race calendar ==
The calendar was announced in November 2018 with seven confirmed dates. All rounds will be held in Australia.

Round	Circuit	Location	Date
1	(New South Wales) Sydney Motorsport Park	Eastern Creek, New South Wales	17–19 May
2	(Victoria (state)) Phillip Island Grand Prix Circuit	Phillip Island, Victoria	6–9 June
3	(South Australia) The Bend Motorsport Park	Tailem Bend, South Australia	12–14 July
4	Queensland Raceway	Ipswich, Queensland	2–4 August
5	(Victoria (state)) Winton Motor Raceway	Benalla, Victoria	31 August–1 September
6	(Victoria (state)) Sandown Raceway	Springvale, Victoria	20–22 September
7	(South Australia) The Bend Motorsport Park	Tailem Bend, South Australia	15–17 November

== Teams and drivers ==
The following teams and drivers are under contract to compete in the 2019 championship:

Team	Car	No.	Drivers	Rounds
(Australia) Melbourne Performance Centre	Volkswagen Golf GTI TCR	2	(Australia) Aaron Cameron	All
(Australia) Melbourne Performance Centre	Volkswagen Golf GTI TCR	8	(Australia) Jason Bright	6-7
(Australia) Melbourne Performance Centre	Volkswagen Golf GTI TCR	35	(Australia) Alexandra Whitley	6-7
(Australia) Melbourne Performance Centre	Audi RS 3 LMS TCR	3	(Australia) Leanne Tander	2–5
(Australia) Melbourne Performance Centre	Audi RS 3 LMS TCR	3	(Australia) Garth Tander	6
(Australia) Melbourne Performance Centre	Audi RS 3 LMS TCR	3	(Australia) Iain McDougall	7
(Australia) Melbourne Performance Centre	Audi RS 3 LMS TCR	4	(Australia) Garth Tander	2–3
(Australia) Melbourne Performance Centre	Audi RS 3 LMS TCR	4	(France) Jean-Karl Vernay (Note: Jean-Karl Vernay was entered into the Queensland Raceway round and contested the first race, but was unable to take part in the second and third races due to illness. Aaron Seton was entered in his place for the remainder of the round.)	4
(Australia) Melbourne Performance Centre	Audi RS 3 LMS TCR	4	(Australia) Aaron Seton	4
(Australia) Melbourne Performance Centre	Audi RS 3 LMS TCR	22	(Netherlands) Rik Breukers	1
(Australia) Melbourne Performance Centre	Audi RS 3 LMS TCR	22	(Australia) Hamish Ribarits	2
(Australia) Melbourne Performance Centre	Audi RS 3 LMS TCR	97	(Australia) Liam McAdam	5–7
(Australia) Melbourne Performance Centre	Audi RS 3 LMS TCR	100	(Australia) Russell Ingall	3–7
(Australia) Kelly Racing	Subaru WRX STI TCR	6	(Australia) Molly Taylor	1–4
(Australia) Kelly Racing	Subaru WRX STI TCR	37	(Australia) Bryce Fullwood	5
(Australia) Kelly Racing	Subaru WRX STI TCR	777	(New Zealand) Andre Heimgartner	1–3
(Australia) Kelly Racing	Holden Astra TCR	37	(Australia) Chelsea Angelo	1–3
(Australia) Kelly Racing	Holden Astra TCR	62	(Australia) Alex Rullo	1–4
(Australia) Kelly Racing	Holden Astra TCR	62	(Australia) Hamish Ribarits	5
(Australia) Kelly Racing	Holden Astra TCR	62	(Australia) Bryce Fullwood	6
(Australia) Kelly Racing	Holden Astra TCR	62	(Australia) Chelsea Angelo	7
(Australia) Kelly Racing	Holden Astra TCR	777	(New Zealand) Andre Heimgartner	4–7
(Australia) Garry Rogers Motorsport	Alfa Romeo Giulietta Veloce TCR	7	(Australia) Jimmy Vernon	1–3
(Australia) Garry Rogers Motorsport	Alfa Romeo Giulietta Veloce TCR	7	(Australia) Jordan Cox	4–7
(Australia) Garry Rogers Motorsport	Renault Mégane R.S TCR	33	(New Zealand) Chris Pither	All
(Australia) Garry Rogers Motorsport	Renault Mégane R.S TCR	34	(Australia) James Moffat	All
(Australia) Matt Stone Racing	Volkswagen Golf GTI TCR	8	(Australia) Jason Bright	1–5
(Australia) Matt Stone Racing	Volkswagen Golf GTI TCR	35	(Australia) Alexandra Whitley	1–5
(Australia) Ashley Seward Motorsport	Alfa Romeo Giulietta Veloce TCR	9	(Australia) Dylan O'Keeffe	All
(Australia) Ashley Seward Motorsport	Alfa Romeo Giulietta Veloce TCR	10	(Australia) James Allen	7
(Australia) HMO Customer Racing	Hyundai i30 N TCR	11	(Australia) Nathan Morcom	All
(Australia) HMO Customer Racing	Hyundai i30 N TCR	30	(Australia) Will Brown	All
(Australia) Milldun Motorsport	Subaru WRX STI TCR	19	(Australia) Mat Simmons	7
(Australia) Milldun Motorsport	Subaru WRX STI TCR	27	(Australia) Barton Mawer	7
(Australia) Wall Racing	Honda Civic Type R TCR (FK8)	24	(Australia) John Martin	All
(Australia) Wall Racing	Honda Civic Type R TCR (FK8)	38	(Australia) Jordan Cox	3
(Australia) Wall Racing	Honda Civic Type R TCR (FK8)	38	(New Zealand) Jordan Michels	4
(Australia) Wall Racing	Honda Civic Type R TCR (FK8)	38	(Australia) Tim Brook	5
(Australia) Wall Racing	Honda Civic Type R TCR (FK8)	38	(Argentina) Néstor Girolami	6
(Australia) Wall Racing	Honda Civic Type R TCR (FK8)	50	(Australia) Tony D'Alberto	All
Garth Walden Racing Australia	Hyundai i30 N TCR	29	(Australia) Michael Almond	1
(New Zealand) Team Garage1	CUPRA León TCR	64	(Australia) Tim Brook	7
(Belgium) DG Sport Compétition	Peugeot 308 TCR	308	(France) Aurélien Comte	7

== Results and standings ==
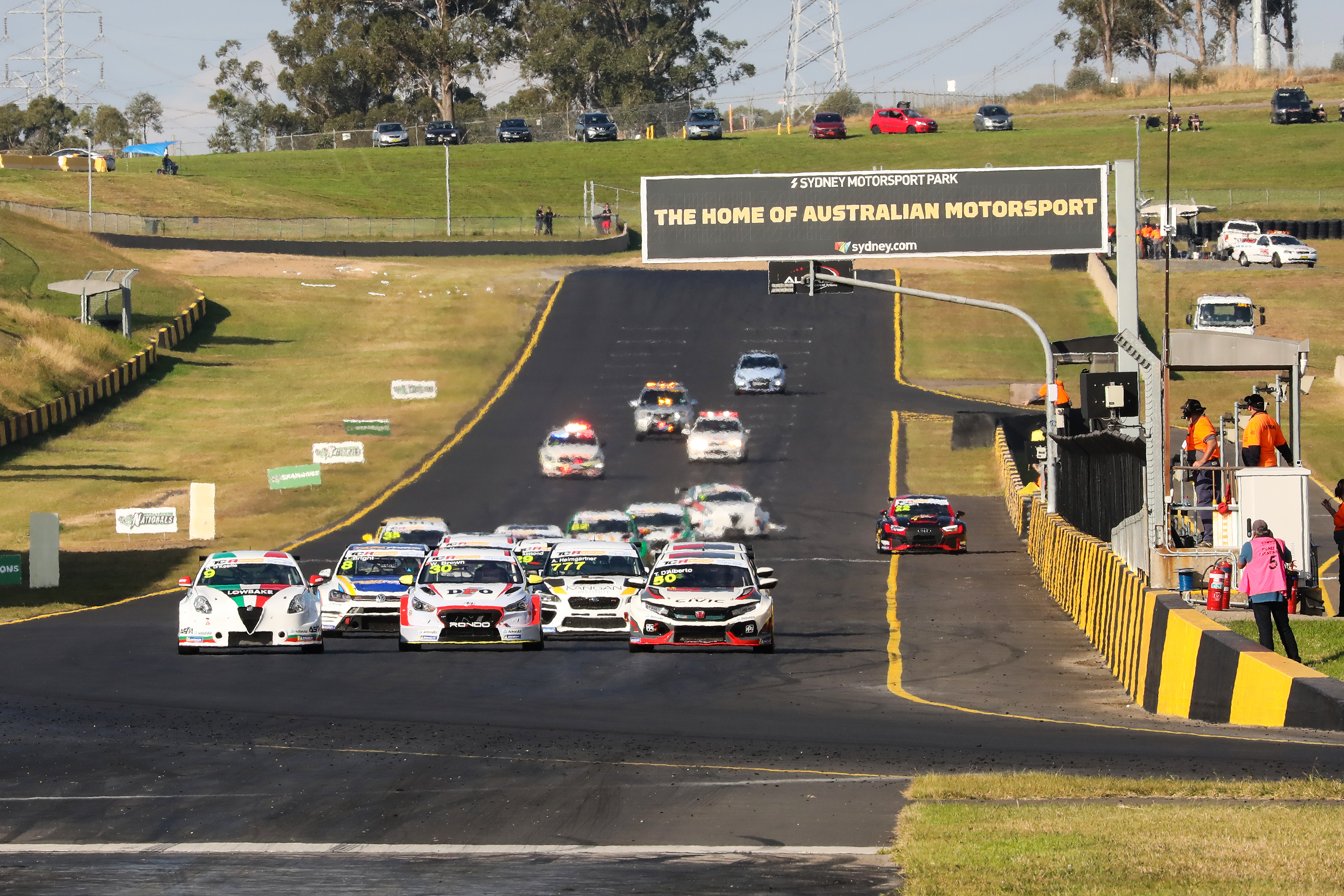
The start of Race 3 at Sydney Motorsport Park.

=== Race results ===
Rnd.		Circuit	Date	Pole position	Fastest lap	Winning driver	Winning team
1	R1	(New South Wales) Sydney Motorsport Park	18 May	(Australia) Tony D'Alberto	(Australia) Jason Bright	(Australia) Jason Bright	(Australia) Matt Stone Racing
1	R2	(New South Wales) Sydney Motorsport Park	19 May		(Australia) Will Brown	(Australia) Will Brown	(Australia) HMO Customer Racing
1	R3	(New South Wales) Sydney Motorsport Park	19 May		(Australia) Nathan Morcom	(Australia) Will Brown	(Australia) HMO Customer Racing
2	R1	(Victoria (state)) Phillip Island Grand Prix Circuit	8 June	(Australia) Dylan O'Keeffe	(Australia) Will Brown	(Australia) Dylan O'Keeffe	(Australia) Ashley Seward Motorsport
2	R2	(Victoria (state)) Phillip Island Grand Prix Circuit	9 June		(Australia) Dylan O'Keeffe	(Australia) Dylan O'Keeffe	(Australia) Ashley Seward Motorsport
2	R3	(Victoria (state)) Phillip Island Grand Prix Circuit	9 June		(Australia) Will Brown	(Australia) Will Brown	(Australia) HMO Customer Racing
3	R1	(South Australia) The Bend Motorsport Park	13 July	(Australia) James Moffat	(Australia) Dylan O'Keeffe	(Australia) Garth Tander	(Australia) Melbourne Performance Centre
3	R2	(South Australia) The Bend Motorsport Park	14 July		(Australia) Will Brown	(Australia) Will Brown	(Australia) HMO Customer Racing
3	R3	(South Australia) The Bend Motorsport Park	14 July		(Australia) Tony D'Alberto	(Australia) John Martin	(Australia) Wall Racing
4	R1	Queensland Raceway	3 August	(France) Jean-Karl Vernay	(France) Jean-Karl Vernay	(France) Jean-Karl Vernay	(Australia) Melbourne Performance Centre
4	R2	Queensland Raceway	4 August		(Australia) Russell Ingall	(Australia) Dylan O'Keeffe	(Australia) Ashley Seward Motorsport
4	R3	Queensland Raceway	4 August		(Australia) Will Brown	(Australia) Dylan O'Keeffe	(Australia) Ashley Seward Motorsport
5	R1	(Victoria (state)) Winton Motor Raceway	31 August	(Australia) Will Brown	(Australia) Will Brown	(Australia) Jason Bright	(Australia) Matt Stone Racing
5	R2	(Victoria (state)) Winton Motor Raceway	1 September		(Australia) Will Brown	(Australia) Will Brown	(Australia) HMO Customer Racing
5	R3	(Victoria (state)) Winton Motor Raceway	1 September		(Australia) Will Brown	(Australia) Will Brown	(Australia) HMO Customer Racing
6	R1	(Victoria (state)) Sandown Raceway	21 September	(Argentina) Néstor Girolami	(Australia) Liam McAdam	(Argentina) Néstor Girolami	(Australia) Wall Racing
6	R2	(Victoria (state)) Sandown Raceway	22 September		(Argentina) Néstor Girolami	(Argentina) Néstor Girolami	(Australia) Wall Racing
6	R3	(Victoria (state)) Sandown Raceway	22 September		(Australia) Jordan Cox	(Argentina) Néstor Girolami	(Australia) Wall Racing
7	R1	(South Australia) The Bend Motorsport Park	16 November	(Australia) Dylan O'Keeffe	(Australia) Will Brown	(Australia) Will Brown	(Australia) HMO Customer Racing
7	R2	(South Australia) The Bend Motorsport Park	17 November		(Australia) Aaron Cameron	(Australia) Aaron Cameron	(Australia) Melbourne Performance Centre
7	R3	(South Australia) The Bend Motorsport Park	17 November		(Australia) Nathan Morcom	(Australia) Nathan Morcom	(Australia) HMO Customer Racing

Points system

Position	**1st**	**2nd**	**3rd**	**4th**	**5th**	**6th**	**7th**	**8th**	**9th**	**10th**	**11th**	**12th**	**13th**	**14th**	**15th**	**16th**	**17th**	**18th**	**19th**	**20th**	**DNF**
Race 1 & 2	40	36	32	28	26	24	22	20	18	16	14	13	12	11	10	9	8	7	6	5	0
Race 3	50	46	42	38	36	31	29	27	25	23	19	18	17	16	15	12	11	10	9	8	0

- Two (2) points will be awarded for obtaining Pole Position in qualifying.

=== Drivers' standings ===
Pos.	Driver	SYD (New South Wales)			PHI (Victoria (state))			BEN (South Australia)			QLD (Queensland)			WIN (Victoria (state))			SAN (Victoria (state))			BEN (South Australia)			Pen.	Points
1	(Australia) Will Brown	3	1	1	2	2	1	2	1	5	16	10	8	**2**	1	1	2	7	7	1	2	3		743
2	(Australia) Tony D'Alberto	**2**	3	6	4	15	15	13	9	7	4	4	3	6	7	5	15	4	3	3	5	5		567
3	(Australia) Aaron Cameron	7	10	4	12	7	3	12	Ret	13	6	3	5	5	3	2	9	5	6	2	1	10		553
4	(Australia) Nathan Morcom	9	8	11	Ret	4	2	4	7	8	7	6	4	4	4	4	10	14	10	Ret	6	1		510
5	(Australia) Dylan O'Keeffe	4	2	2	**1**	1	Ret	Ret	11	11	2	1	1	3	15	8	8	8	11	**DNS**	Ret	DNS		483
6	(Australia) James Moffat	Ret	12	5	3	10	5	**7**	3	3	9	8	15	Ret	12	13	7	3	9	9	4	Ret		440
7	(Australia) Jason Bright	1	4	7	Ret	Ret	8	Ret	11	9	13	13	10	1	2	12	Ret	6	4	7	7	7	20	419
8	(Australia) John Martin	6	6	Ret	13	14	Ret	3	4	1	15	7	6	14	8	6	5	Ret	DNS	6	11	6		397
9	(Australia) Russell Ingall							9	6	6	3	2	2	8	5	3	12	Ret	DNS	8	9	Ret		326
10	(Australia) Garth Tander				10	Ret	4	1	2	2							4	2	2					286
11	(Australia) Jordan Cox							6	5	4	5	5	7	Ret	9	Ret	3	13	Ret	5	3	Ret	10	281
12	(New Zealand) Chris Pither	8	Ret	8	7	6	7	5	Ret	DNS	DNS	16	DNS	Ret	Ret	DNS	11	11	DNS	4	8	2		280
13	(New Zealand) Andre Heimgartner	10	5	Ret	9	Ret	6	Ret	DNS	DNS	Ret	DNS	DNS	7	6	7	Ret	12	8	13	10	4		272
14	(Australia) Leanne Tander				8	13	10	11	8	10	12	9	9	12	11	9								220
15	(Australia) Alexandra Whitley	13	16	10	11	9	Ret	10	Ret	Ret	10	Ret	14	13	14	14	14	Ret	Ret	11	13	11		220
16	(Australia) Alex Rullo	11	13	9	6	5	12	8	Ret	12	8	11	13											209
17	(Argentina) Néstor Girolami																**1**	1	1					132
18	(Australia) Hamish Ribarits				5	3	9							Ret	13	10								118
19	(Australia) Molly Taylor	14	15	12	Ret	11	13	15	Ret	DNS	14	15	Ret	11	Ret	Ret								116
20	(Australia) Liam McAdam													10	10	15	6	10	12	Ret	DNS	DNS		105
21	(Australia) Tim Brook													9	16	11				Ret	16	9		80
22	(Australia) Jimmy Vernon	16	9	Ret	Ret	8	11	14	Ret	DNS														77
23	(Australia) Bryce Fullwood													15	Ret	Ret	13	9	5					76
24	(Australia) Michael Almond	15	7	3																				74
25	(Australia) Chelsea Angelo	12	14	Ret	Ret	12	14	Ret	12	Ret	DNS	DNS	DNS							Ret	DNS	DNS	10	56
26	(New Zealand) Jordan Michels										11	12	12											46
27	(Australia) Iain McDougall																			10	15	12		44
28	(France) Jean-Karl Vernay										**1**	WD	WD											42
29	(Netherlands) Rik Breukers	5	11	Ret																				40
30	(France) Aurélien Comte																			DNS	14	8		38
31	(Australia) Matthew Simmons																			12	17	13		38
32	(Australia) James Allen																			Ret	12	14		29
33	(Australia) Barton Mawer																			Ret	18	15		22
34	(Australia) Aaron Seton											14	11											0
Pos.	Driver	SYD (New South Wales)			PHI (Victoria (state))			BEN (South Australia)			QLD (Queensland)			WIN (Victoria (state))			SAN (Victoria (state))			BEN (South Australia)			Pen.	Points

Key
Colour	Result
Gold	Winner
Silver	Second place
Bronze	Third place
Green	Other points position
Blue	Other classified position
Blue	Not classified, finished (NC)
Purple	Not classified, retired (Ret)
Red	Did not qualify (DNQ)
Red	Did not pre-qualify (DNPQ)
Black	Disqualified (DSQ)
White	Did not start (DNS)
White	Race cancelled (C)
Blank	Did not practice (DNP)
Blank	Excluded (EX)
Blank	Did not arrive (DNA)
Blank	Withdrawn (WD)
Blank	Did not enter (cell empty)
Text formatting	Meaning
**Bold**	Pole position
Italics	Fastest lap
