= 2014 Australian Drivers' Championship =

Motor racing competition

The 2014 Australian Drivers' Championship was a CAMS sanctioned Australian motor racing title, with the winner awarded the 2014 CAMS Gold Star. It was the 58th Australian Drivers' Championship and the tenth to use open wheel racing cars constructed in accordance with FIA Formula 3 regulations. The championship began on 27 February at the Adelaide Parklands Circuit and ended on 2 November at Sydney Motorsport Park after seven rounds across five different states and territories. Formula 3 Management Pty Ltd was appointed by CAMS as the Category Manager for the Championship. The championship was promoted as the 2014 Formula 3 Australian Drivers' Championship with the winner awarded the 58th Australian Drivers' Championship and the 14th Australian Formula 3 Championship.

The championship was won by Simon Hodge, driving a Mygale M11 Mercedes-Benz for Team BRM.

== Race calendar ==
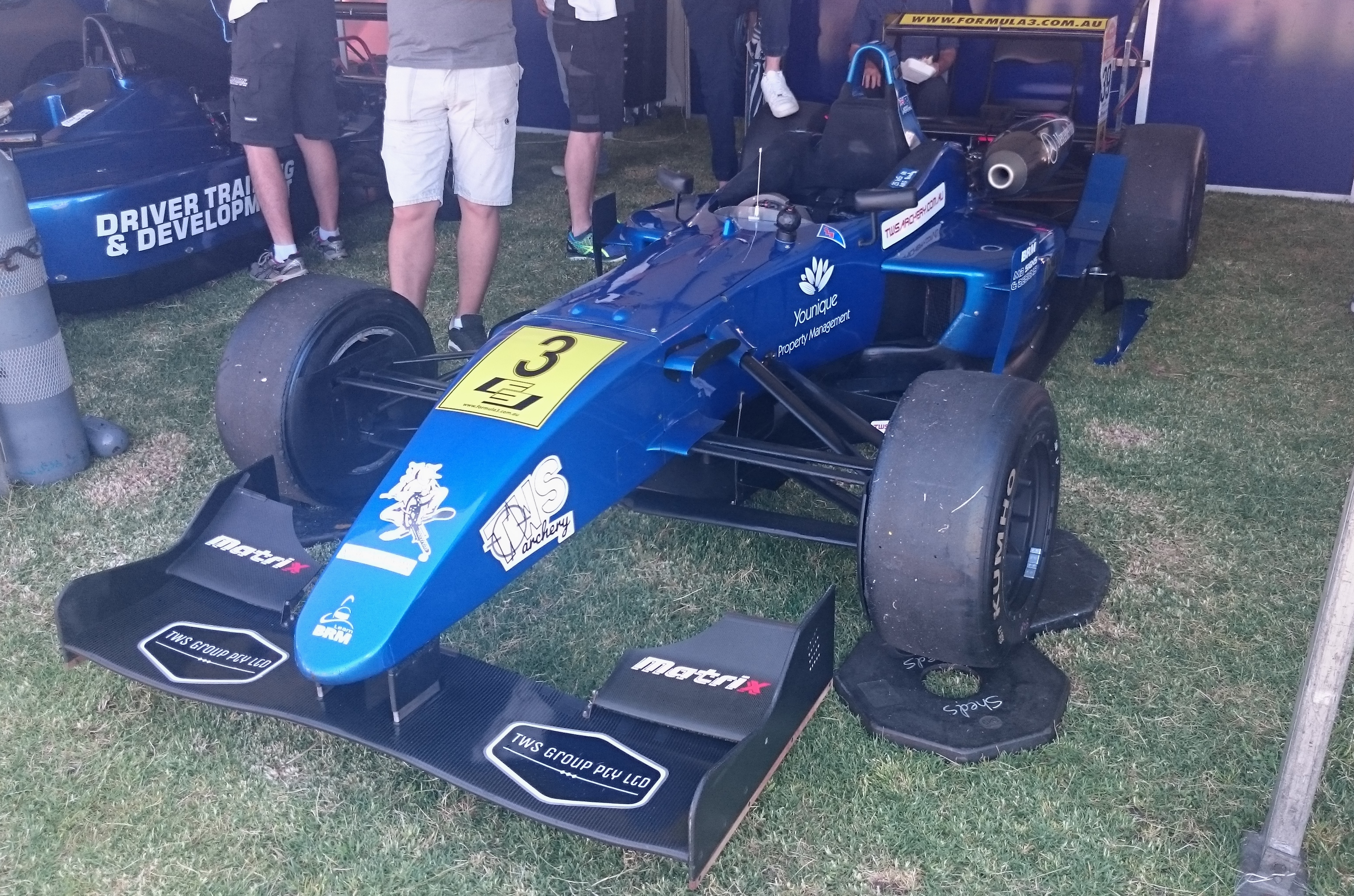
Simon Hodge won the championship driving a Team BRM entered Mygale M11 (similar to that pictured above)

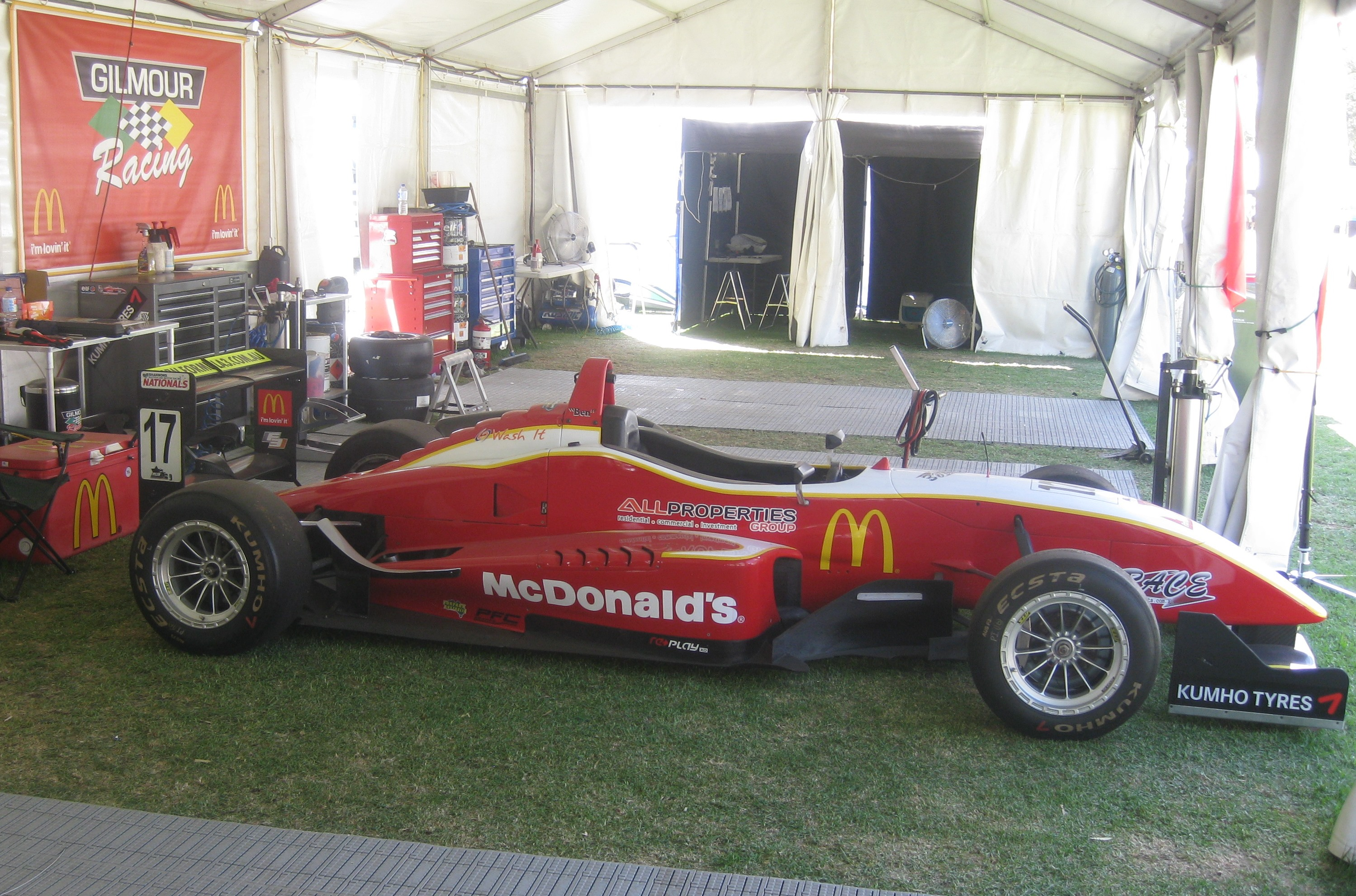
Ben Gersekowski placed second in the championship driving a Dallara F311 Mercedes-Benz

The championship was contested over a seven-round series.

Round	Circuit	Date	Format	Championship Winner	National Winner	Kumho Cup Winner
1	(South Australia) Adelaide Street Circuit	27 February –1 March	Three races	Simon Hodge; Mygale M11 Mercedes-Benz	Chelsea Angelo; Dallara F307 Mercedes-Benz	not present
2	(Victoria (state)) Sandown Raceway	28–30 March	Three races	Ben Gersekowski; Dallara F311 Mercedes-Benz	Chelsea Angelo; Dallara F307 Mercedes-Benz	Nathan Gotch; Dallara F304; Renault Sodemo
3	(New South Wales) Mount Panorama Circuit	18–20 April	Two races	Christopher Anthony; Dallara F307 Mercedes-Benz	Chelsea Angelo; Dallara F307 Mercedes-Benz	Roland Legge; Dallara F304; Spiess Opel
4	(Northern Territory) Hidden Valley Raceway	20–22 June	Three races	Simon Hodge; Mygale M11 Mercedes-Benz	Garnet Patterson; Dallara F307 Mercedes-Benz	not present
5	Queensland Raceway	8–10 August	Three races	Ben Gersekowski; Dallara F311 Mercedes-Benz	Garnet Patterson; Dallara F307 Mercedes-Benz	not present
6	(Victoria (state)) Phillip Island	19–21 September	Three races	Simon Hodge; Mygale M11 Mercedes-Benz	Chelsea Angelo; Dallara F307 Mercedes-Benz	not present
7	(New South Wales) Sydney Motorsport Park	31 October– 2 November	Three races	Simon Hodge; Mygale M11 Mercedes-Benz	Garnet Patterson; Dallara F307 Mercedes-Benz	Nathan Gotch; Dallara F304; Renault Sodemo

Note:

- The results for each round of the Championship were determined by the results of the final race at that round.
- The Kumho Cup was contested only at Rounds 2, 3 and 7.

== Teams and drivers ==
The following teams and drivers contested the 2014 Australian Drivers' Championship.

Team	Class	Chassis	Engine	No.	Driver
Team BRM	Gold Star	Dallara F307; Mygale M11	HWA-Mercedes-Benz	3	(Australia) John Magro
Team BRM	Gold Star	Mygale M11	HWA-Mercedes-Benz	4	(Australia) Simon Hodge
Team BRM	Gold Star	Dallara F307; Mygale M11	HWA-Mercedes-Benz	5	(Australia) Christopher Anthony
R-Tek Motorsport	Gold Star	Dallara F307	HWA-Mercedes-Benz	7	(Australia) Jon Collins
R-Tek Motorsport	National	Dallara F307	HWA-Mercedes-Benz	7	(Australia) Roland Legge
R-Tek Motorsport	Kumho Cup	Dallara F304	Spiess-Opel	9	(Australia) Roland Legge
R-Tek Motorsport	Kumho Cup	Dallara F304	Spiess-Opel	8	(Australia) Roman Krumins
Gilmour Racing	Gold Star	Dallara F311	HWA-Mercedes-Benz	17	(Australia) Ben Gersekowski
Garnet Patterson Racing	National	Dallara F307	HWA-Mercedes-Benz	29	(Australia) Garnet Patterson
Chelsea Angelo Racing; Evans Motorsport Group	National	Dallara F307	HWA-Mercedes-Benz	34	(Australia) Chelsea Angelo
Harvest Motorsport	Gold Star	Mygale M11	HWA-Mercedes-Benz	46	(South Africa) Arrie Maree
AGI Sport	Kumho Cup	Dallara F304	Sodemo-Renault	66	(Australia) Nathan Gotch
Modena Engineering	Kumho Cup	Dallara F304	Spiess-Opel	88	(Australia) Dennie Rumble
Modena Engineering	Gold Star	Dallara F307	Mugen-Honda	92	(Australia) Ricky Capo
Varney Racing	Kumho Cup	Dallara F304	Spiess-Opel	16	(Australia) Blake Varney
Scott Motorsport	Kumho Cup	Dallara F304	Sodemo-Renault	89	(Australia) Paul Scott Jr.

Note: All chassis constructed between 1 January 2008 and 31 December 2011 were required to be fitted with a HWA Mercedes-Benz series M271 ‘Australian control engine’.

== Classes ==
Competing cars were nominated into one of four classes:

- Australian Formula 3 Championship – Automobiles constructed in accordance with the FIA Formula 3 regulations that applied in the year of manufacture between 1 January 2005 and 31 December 2011.
- National Class – Automobiles constructed in accordance with the FIA Formula 3 regulations that applied in the year of manufacture between 1 January 1999 and 31 December 2007.
- Kumho Cup Class – Automobiles constructed in accordance with the FIA Formula 3 regulations that applied in the year of manufacture between 1 January 1999 and 31 December 2004.
- Invitational Class.

== Points system ==
Championship points were awarded in each class as follows:

- One point was awarded to the driver placed in the highest grid position in each class for the first race at each round.
- 20–15–12–10–8–6–4–3–2–1 for the first ten finishing positions in each class in each race of a round which comprised two races.
- 12–9–8–7–6–5–4–3–2–1 for the first ten finishing positions in each class in each of the first two races of a round which comprised three races.
- 20–15–12–10–8–6–4–3–2–1 basis for the first ten finishing positions in each class in the third race of a round which comprised three races.
- One point was awarded to the driver setting the fastest lap time in each class in each race.

== Championship standings ==
	Gold Star				
Position	Driver	No.	Car	Competitor / Team	Points
1	Simon Hodge	4	Mygale M11 Mercedes-Benz	Team BRM	283
2	Ben Gersekowski	17	Dallara F311 Mercedes-Benz	McDonald's Gilmour Racing	248
3	Christopher Anthony	5	Dallara F307 Mercedes-Benz; Mygale M11 Mercedes-Benz	Team BRM	188
4	Ricky Capo	92	Dallara F307 Mugen Honda	Modena / Bearing Logistics	112
5	Arrie Maree	46	Mygale M11 Mercedes-Benz	Harvest Motorsport / Forpark	67
6	John Magro	3	Dallara F307 Mercedes-Benz	Team BRM / FNQ Lager	40
7	Chris Gilmour	18	Dallara F307 Mercedes-Benz	McDonald's / Gilmour Racing	20
8	Jon Collins	7	Dallara F307 Mercedes-Benz	R-Tek Motorsport	20
9	James Winslow	6	Dallara F307 Mercedes-Benz	R-Tek Motorsport	19
	National				
Position	Driver	No.	Car	Competitor / Team	Points
1	Garnet Patterson	29	Dallara F307 Mercedes-Benz	Garnet Patterson Racing	245
2	Chelsea Angelo	34	Dallara F307 Mercedes-Benz	Ozstaff Racing	204
3	Roland Legge	7	Dallara F307 Mercedes-Benz	R-Tek Motorsport	58
	Kumho Cup				
Position	Driver	No.	Car	Competitor / Team	Points
1	Roland Legge	9	Dallara F304 Spiess Opel	R-Tek Motorsport	110
2	Nathan Gotch	66	Dallara F304 Renault Sodemo	AGI Sport	99
3	Dennie Rumble	88	Dallara F304 Spiess Opel	Alpine Motorsport	41

== See also ==
- Australian Drivers' Championship
- Australian Formula 3
