= Simon Hodge =

Australian racing driver

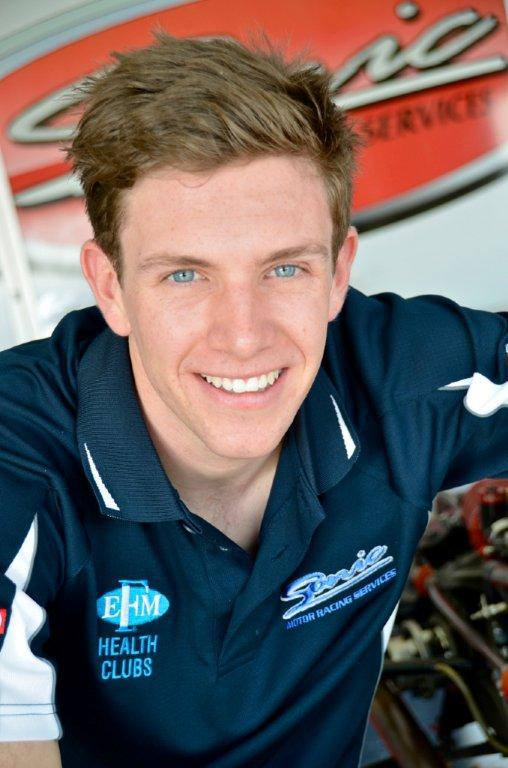
- Nationality: Australian
- Born: 17 February 1994 (age 32) Adelaide, South Australia

Previous series
- 2011-13: Australian Formula Ford Champ.

Championship titles
- 2014: Australian Drivers' Championship

Awards
- 2014: CAMS Gold Star
- Statistics up to date as of 2 November 2014.

Simon Neil Hodge (born 17 February 1994) is a racing driver from Adelaide, South Australia, Australia and winner of the 2014 Australian Drivers' Championship. In March 2014, he set a new lap record for the Adelaide Street Circuit and in April 2014 also broke the Mount Panorama lap record. Hodge currently holds the record for the most consecutive pole positions in Australian Drivers' Championship history with seven.

== Lap Records ==
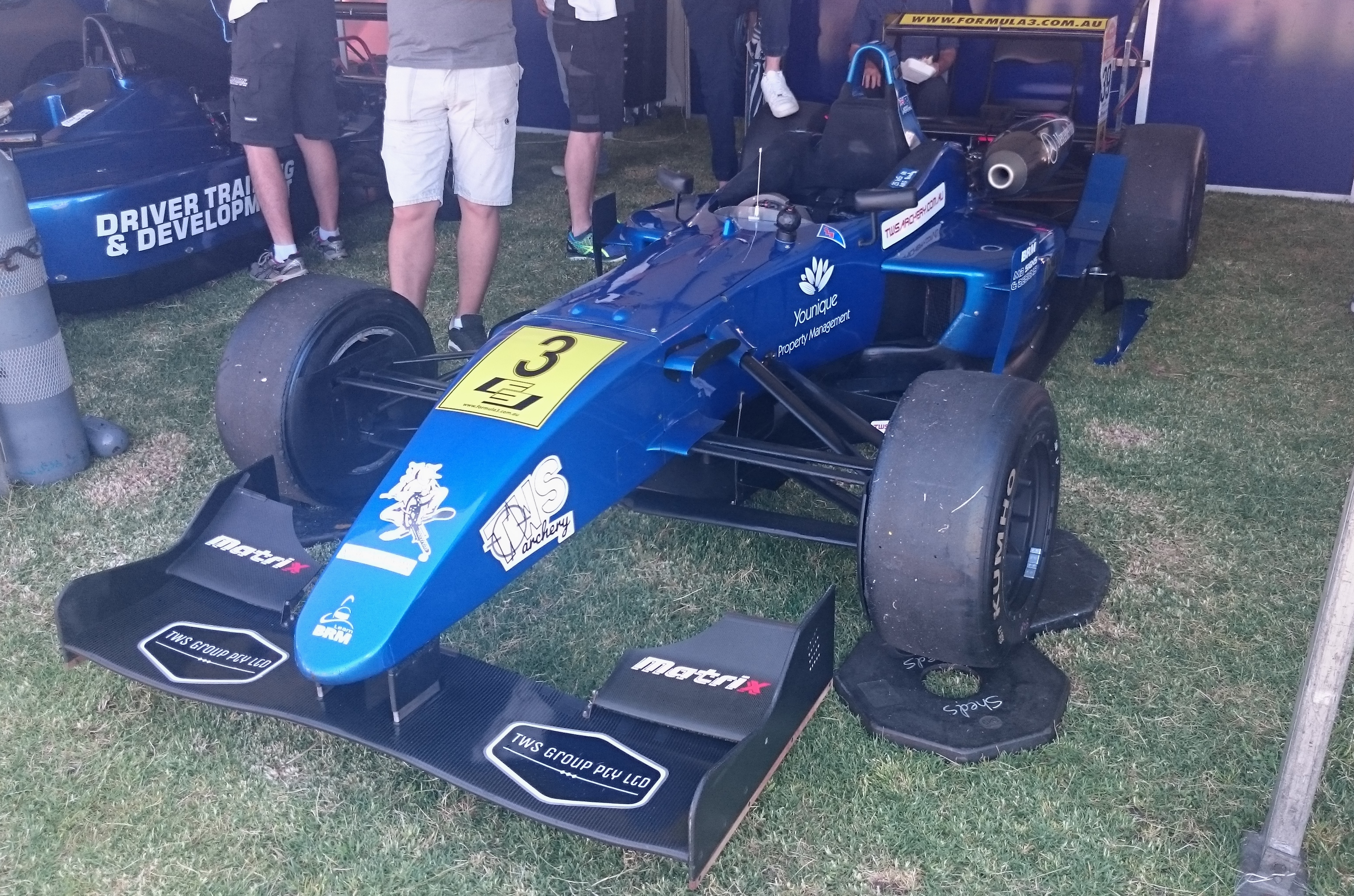
Hodge won the 2014 Australian Drivers' Championship driving a Team BRM-entered Mygale M11, similar to that pictured above

Season	Track	Event	Time	Car	Team	Notes
2014	Adelaide Street Circuit	Clipsal 500	1:17.9726	Mygale M11-Mercedes-Benz	Team BRM	Outright record (V8 Supercar layout)
2014	Sandown Raceway	Shannons Nationals	1:07.4736	Mygale M11-Mercedes-Benz	Team BRM	Formula 3 record
2014	Mount Panorama Circuit	Bathurst Motor Festival	2:02.6701	Mygale M11-Mercedes-Benz	Team BRM	Outright record
2014	Hidden Valley Raceway	SkyCity Triple Crown	1:05.1101	Mygale M11-Mercedes-Benz	Team BRM	Formula 3 record

== Career results ==
=== Karting career summary ===
Season	Series	Position
2010	Australian National Sprint Kart Championships - Junior National Heavy	18th
2010	Australian National Sprint Kart Championships - Junior Clubman	2nd

=== Career summary ===
Season	Series	Position	Car	Team
2011	Australian Formula Ford Championship	20th	Mygale SJ11a	Team BRM
2012	Australian Formula Ford Championship	8th	Mygale SJ11a	Team BRM
2013	Australian Drivers' Championship	13th	Dallara F307-Mercedes-Benz	Team BRM
2013	Australian Formula Ford Championship	5th	Mygale SJ12a	Sonic Motor Racing Services
2014	Australian Drivers' Championship	1st	Mygale M11	Team BRM
2015	Australian Carrera Cup Championship	17th	Porsche 911 GT3 Cup Type 991	Team BRM

=== Complete Bathurst 12 Hour results ===
Year	Team	Co-drivers	Car	Class	Laps	Overall position	Class position
2015	(Australia) Erebus Motorsport	(United States) Austin Cindric (Australia) Nathan Morcom	Mercedes-Benz SLS AMG	AA	251	21st	7th
