= TCR Australia Touring Car Series =

Touring car racing series based in Australia

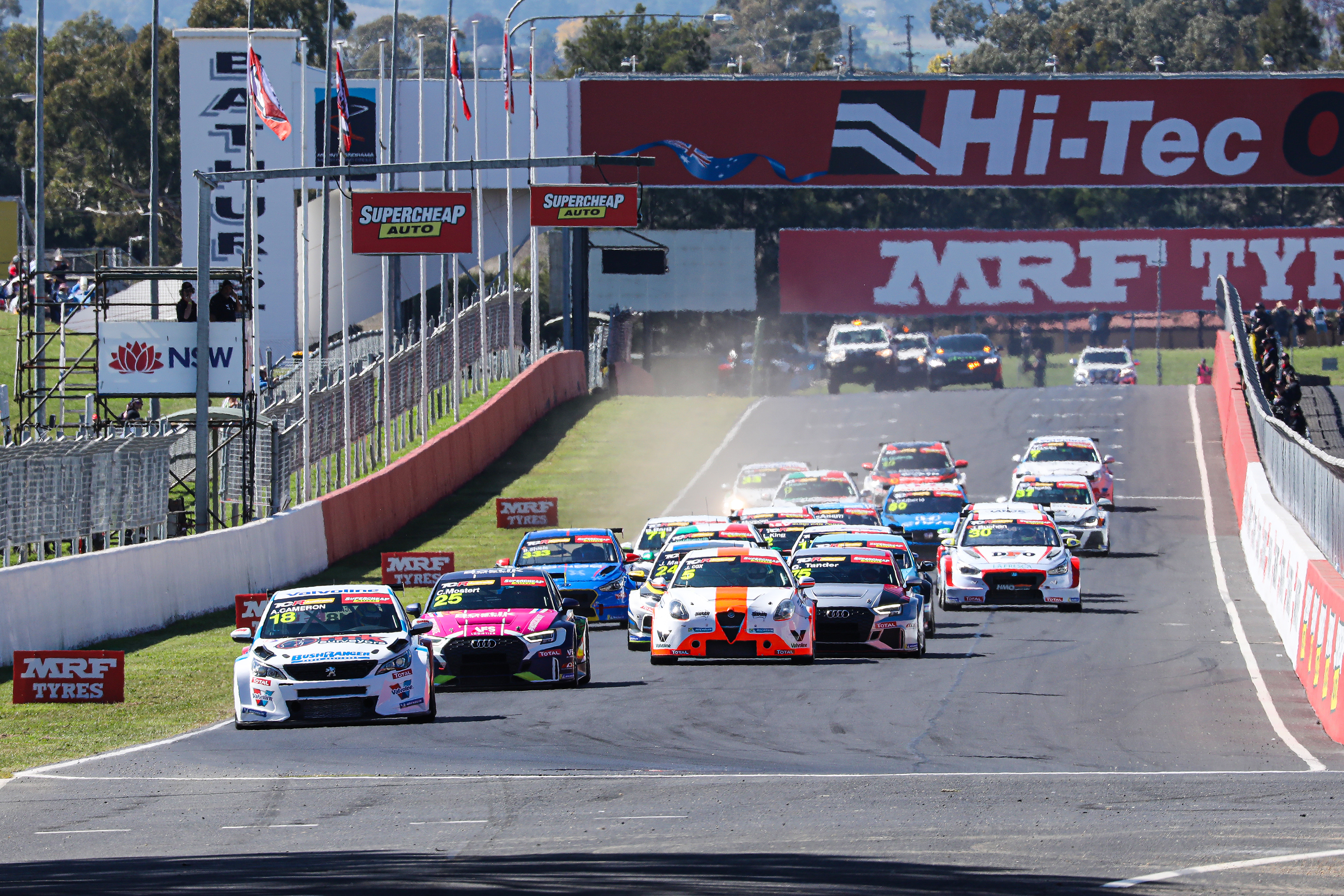
- Category: Touring cars
- Country: Australia
- Inaugural season: 2019
- Folded: 2026
- Constructors: Audi; Cupra; Honda; Hyundai; Lynk & Co; Peugeot
- Tyre suppliers: Kumho
- Last Drivers' champion: (Australia) Josh Buchan
- Official website: http://www.tcraustralia.com

The TCR Australia Touring Car Series was a touring car racing series based in Australia. The series was run as part of the Shannons Nationals series.

== Background ==
The TCR Touring Car formula, introduced in 2014, is based on four or five door front-wheel drive production vehicles powered by 2.0 litre turbocharged engines. Since then, several global and regional TCR championships have been established and TCR regulations have been adopted in several series, including the World Touring Car Cup from 2018 onwards. The performance of different models of car is managed and adjusted through a Balance of Performance system to attempt to maintain parity.

Plans for an Australian TCR championship were floated as early as 2016, with a proposal for invitational entries in the Bathurst 12 Hour as well as a six-round championship commencing in 2017, to have been shared between Shannons Nationals and Supercars Championship, the premier touring car category in Australia, events. A later proposal in 2017 included TCR cars running in a support class to the Australian GT Championship's GT Trophy series before launching a standalone series in 2018. While neither plan eventuated, in January 2018 the Confederation of Australian Motor Sport announced they had secured the rights to develop a TCR series in Australia starting from 2019, with the Australian Racing Group later announced as the promoter of the series.

== History ==
The inaugural season of TCR Australia in 2019 featured a seven-round calendar run at Shannons Nationals events. The championship begun with 17 entries with eight manufacturers, Alfa Romeo, Audi, Holden, Honda, Hyundai, Renault, Subaru and Volkswagen represented. Supercars Championship teams Garry Rogers Motorsport, Kelly Racing and Matt Stone Racing were among the teams to prepare cars while former Bathurst 1000 winner Jason Bright became the championship's first race winner at Sydney Motorsport Park in a Volkswagen Golf GTI TCR. Will Brown, in a Hyundai i30 N TCR, won the two Sunday races at the first event and soon became a dominant force in the championship, winning four further races to wrap up the championship title at Sandown Raceway with one round to spare. The series featured a wide range of guest drivers who entered selected rounds of the championship, including World Touring Car Cup regulars Jean-Karl Vernay and Néstor Girolami, who each won races in their only appearance, and former Supercars champions Garth Tander and Russell Ingall.

In 2020, TCR Australia planned to incorporate a round at Mount Panorama Circuit as part of the Bathurst 6 Hour Easter weekend, with the circuit to also host an international TCR endurance race later in the year. An additional non-championship event, known as the TCR Asia Pacific Cup, will appear at the Australian Grand Prix, which eventuated after a bid for TCR Australia to be a support event to the Adelaide 500 was rejected.

The 2025 series was truncated by a lack of competitor interest. Attempts to revive the series with a more modest calendar based at The Bend Motorsport Park in 2026 were cancelled in March that year.

== Champions ==
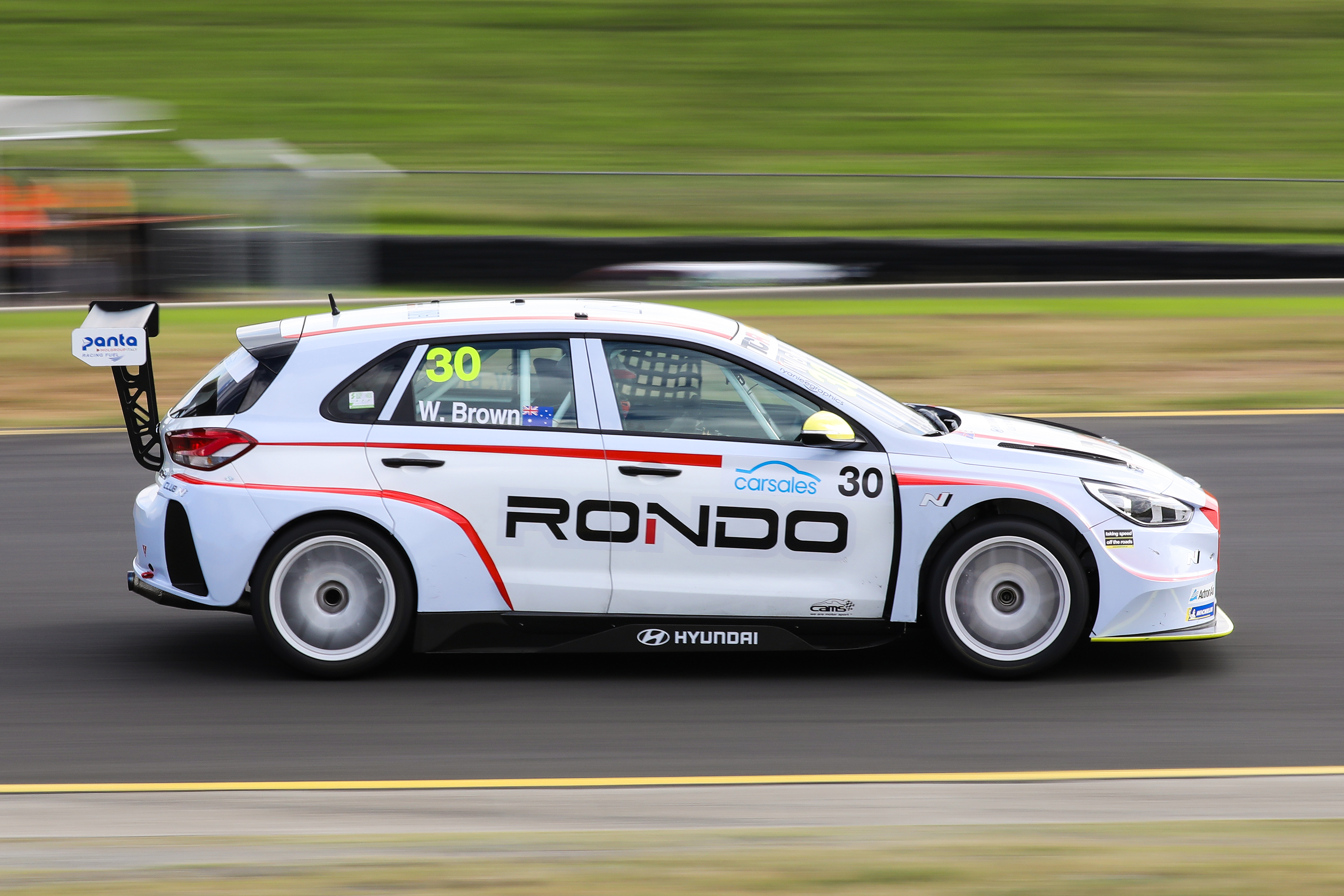
Will Brown was the inaugural TCR Australia champion in 2019

Year	Winner	Car	Team
2019	(Australia) Will Brown	Hyundai i30 N TCR	HMO Customer Racing
2020	Season cancelled due to COVID-19 pandemic		
2021	(Australia) Chaz Mostert	Audi RS 3 LMS TCR	Melbourne Performance Centre
2022	(Australia) Tony D'Alberto	Honda Civic Type R TCR (FK8)	Wall Racing
2023	(Australia) Josh Buchan	Hyundai Elantra N TCR	HMO Customer Racing
2024	(Australia) Josh Buchan	Hyundai Elantra N TCR	HMO Customer Racing
2025	(Australia) Josh Buchan	Hyundai Elantra N TCR	HMO Customer Racing

== Media coverage ==
For the inaugural season in 2019, all TCR Australia races were shown live in Australia on free-to-air network SBS, as well as being streamed online. For 2020, the Seven Network has entered an agreement to broadcast races live in Australia including the S5000 series.
