= Bathurst 6 Hour =

- Venue: Mount Panorama Circuit
- Corporate sponsor: Hi-Tec Oils
- First race: 2016
- Duration: 6 hours
- Most wins (driver): (Australia) Jayden Ojeda (2) (Australia) Simon Hodges (2)
- Most wins (manufacturer): BMW (10)

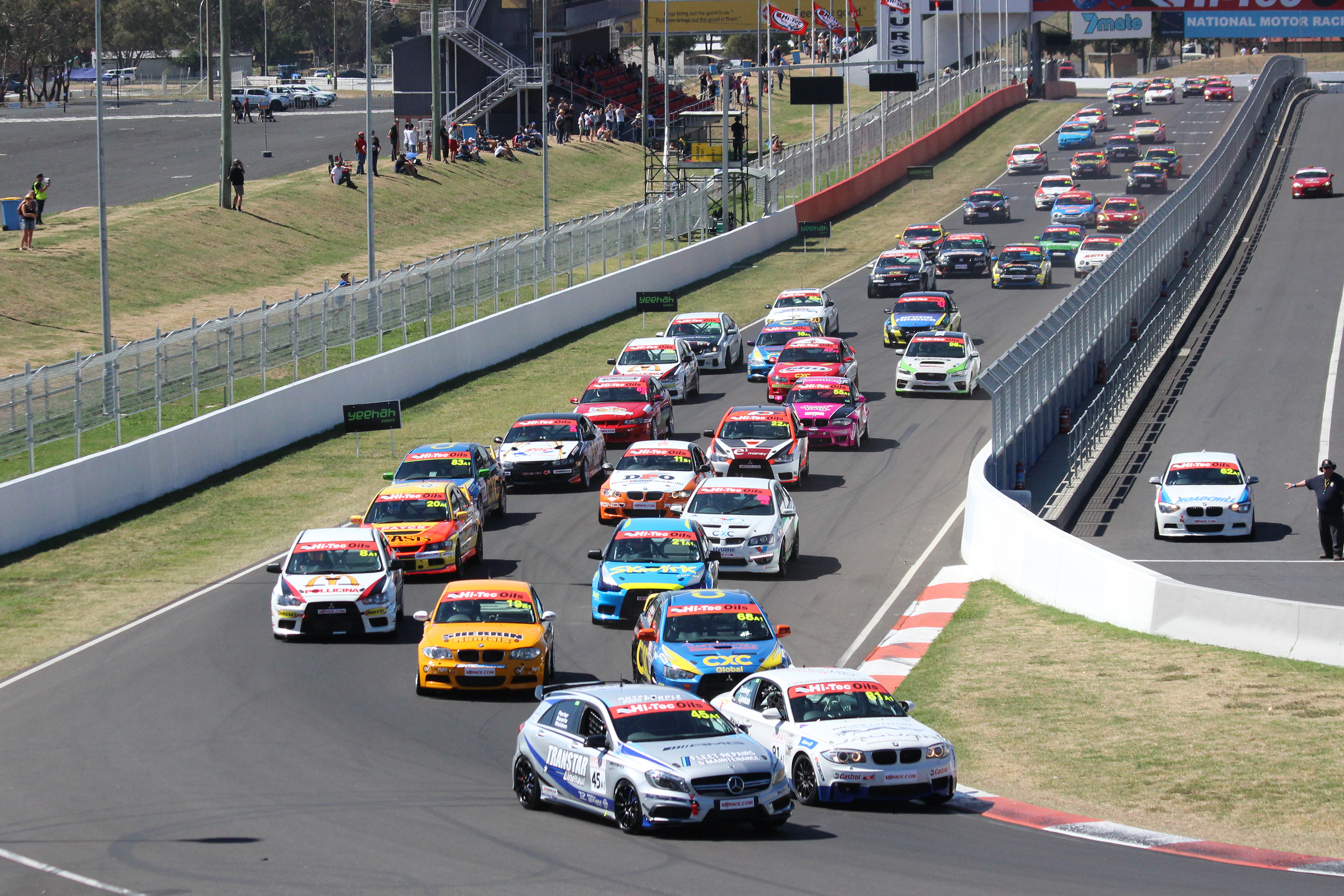
The start of the 2016 Hi-Tec Oils Bathurst 6 Hour.

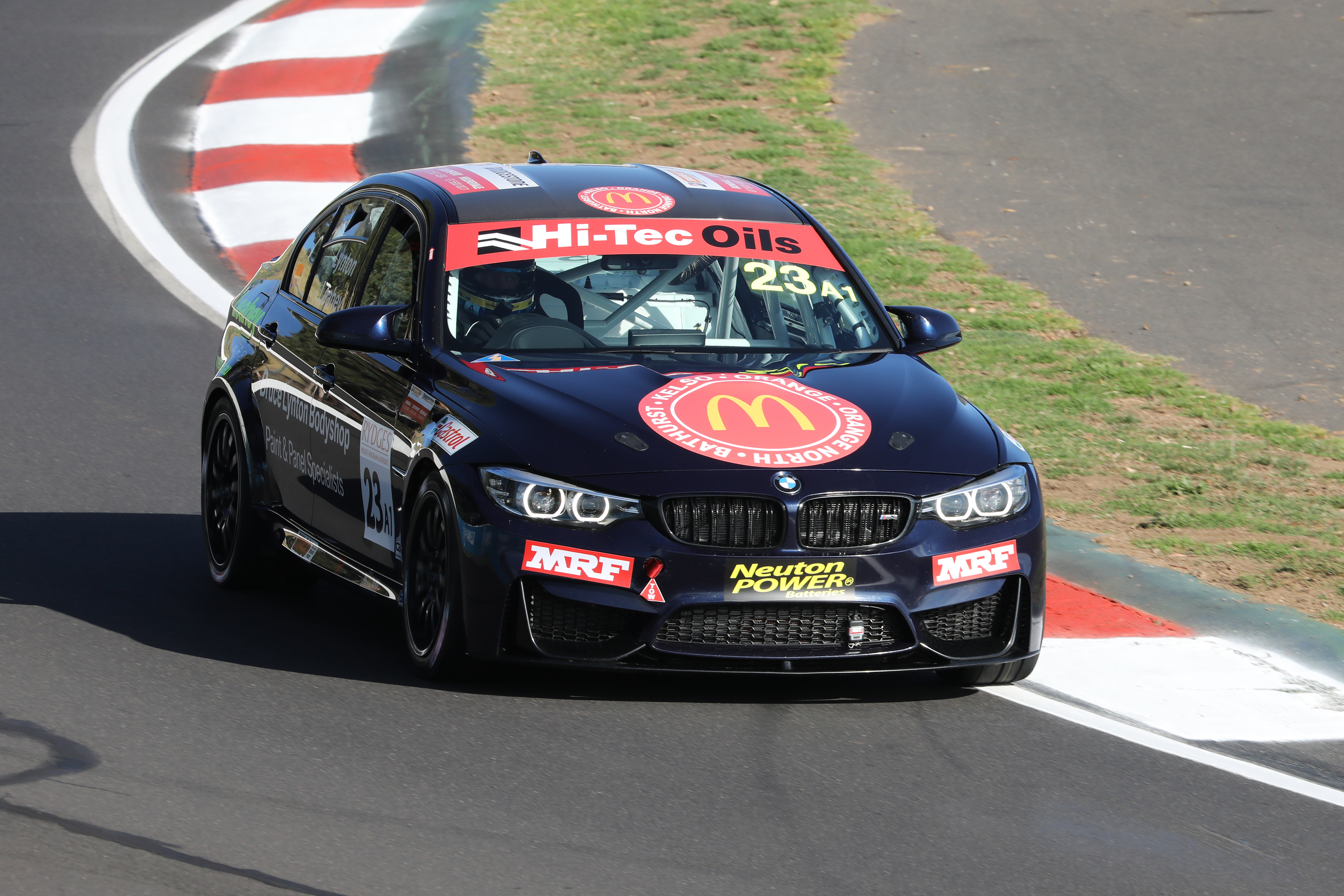
As of 2025, BMW has won every running of the race. Pictured is the M3 F80 Competition of 2019 winners Beric Lynton and Tim Leahey.

The Bathurst 6 Hour, currently known as the Hi-Tec Oils Bathurst 6 Hour for sponsorship reasons, is an annual race for Group 3E Series Production Cars and other invited cars that was first held in 2016. The race is held on Easter Sunday, with practice and qualifying sessions taking place on the preceding two days.

== History ==
The race is not to be confused with the 1962 Bathurst Six Hour Classic, a one-off event held for production touring and sports cars.

The Bathurst 12 Hour was an endurance race held for production cars from 1991 to 1995. It was revived in 2007 and continued as a production car-only race until 2010, before GT3 cars were made eligible for the race in 2011. Over the following years there was growing focus on the outright GT3 cars, while the number of production cars in the race declined. In April 2015, the former promoters of the 12 Hour, Yeehah Events, announced a six-hour race for Group 3E Series Production Cars, called the Bathurst 6 Hour, to be held at the Bathurst Motor Festival in 2016. Cars conforming to other regulations, such as V8 Utes and Saloon Cars, were also allowed to compete in the Invitational class.

In winning the 2017 Bathurst 6 Hour, Paul Morris, driving with Luke Searle, became the first driver to win all of the three current major events at Mount Panorama; the 6 Hour, the Bathurst 1000, which he won in 2014 with Mostert, and the Bathurst 12 Hour, which he won in 2007 and 2010.

The 2020 running of the race was postponed due to the COVID-19 pandemic and was to be part of the inaugural Bathurst International event in November, however this event, along with the 6 Hour, was eventually cancelled due to border closures within Australia arising from the pandemic. The 6 Hour returned to its traditional Easter date in 2021.

== Class structure ==
Entrants in the Bathurst 6 Hour are divided into six classes:

- Class X: Ultimate Performance
- Class A1: Extreme Performance (Forced Induction)
- Class A2: Extreme Performance (Naturally Aspirated)
- Class B1: High Performance (Forced Induction)
- Class B2: High Performance (Naturally Aspirated)
- Class C: Performance
- Class D: Production
- Class E: Compact

== Winners ==
| Year | Drivers | Vehicle | Entrant | Laps | Distance |
|---|---|---|---|---|---|
| 2016 | (Australia) Nathan Morcom (Australia) Chaz Mostert | BMW 335i E92 | (Australia) Direct Plasterboard Outlet | 125 | 776.625 km (482.572 mi) |
| 2017 | (Australia) Luke Searle (Australia) Paul Morris | BMW M135i Hatch F20 | (Australia) Roadchill Freight Express | 113 | 702.069 km (436.245 mi) |
| 2018 | (Australia) Grant Sherrin (Australia) Iain Sherrin | BMW M4 F82 | (Australia) Sherrin Rentals | 109 | 677.217 km (420.803 mi) |
| 2019 | (Australia) Beric Lynton (Australia) Tim Leahey | BMW M3 F80 Competition | (Australia) Bruce Lynton Bodyshop | 131^{1} | 813.903 km (505.736 mi) |
| 2020 | Cancelled due to the COVID-19 pandemic | | | | |
| 2021 | (Australia) Shane Smollen (Australia) Robert Rubis (New Zealand) Shane van Gisbergen | BMW M4 F82 | (Australia) Prestige Connex | 120 | 745.560 km (463.270 mi) |
| 2022 | (Australia) Thomas Sargent (Australia) Cameron Hill | BMW M2 Competition | (Australia) CHE Racing | 130 | 807.690 km (501.875 mi) |
| 2023 | (Australia) Jayden Ojeda (Australia) Simon Hodges | BMW M4 F82 | (Australia) Secure Wealth Advisers | 112 | 695.856 km (432.385 mi) |
| 2024 | (Australia) Jayden Ojeda (Australia) Simon Hodges (Australia) George Miedecke | BMW M4 F82 | (Australia) Secure Wealth Advisers | 123 | 764.199 km (474.851 mi) |
| 2025 | (Australia) Dean Campbell (Australia) Cameron Crick | BMW M2 Competition | (Australia) DA Campbell's Transport | 122 | 757.986km (471.091 mi) |
| 2026 | (Australia) Thomas Randle (Australia) Michael Kavich (Australia) Ben Kavich | BMW M2 Competition | GWR Australia | 114 | 708.282km (440.106 mi) |

^1 – Race record for laps & distance covered.

== Multiple winners ==
=== By manufacturer ===
| Wins | Manufacturer | Years |
|---|---|---|
| 10 | (Germany) BMW | 2016, 2017, 2018, 2019, 2021, 2022, 2023, 2024, 2025, 2026 |

=== By drivers ===
| Wins | Driver | Years |
|---|---|---|
| 2 | (Australia) Jayden Ojeda | 2023, 2024 |
| 2 | (Australia) Simon Hodges | 2023, 2024 |
