= 2017 Australian Production Car Series =

The 2017 Australian Production Car Series was an Australian motor racing competition for Group 3E Series Production Cars. It was sanctioned by the Confederation of Australian Motor Sport (CAMS) as an Authorised Series with Ontic Sports Pty Ltd appointed as the Category Manager. It was the second Australian Production Car Series following the discontinuation of the Australian Production Car Championship at the end of 2015.

The series was won by Grant Sherrin & Iain Sherrin driving a BMW M4.

== Schedule ==
The series was contested over five rounds:

Rd	Circuit	Date
1	Winton	9-11 June
2	Sydney Motorsport Park	7-9 July
3	Queensland Raceway	4-6 August
4	Phillip Island	8-10 September
5	Wakefield Park	18-19 November

== Series standings ==
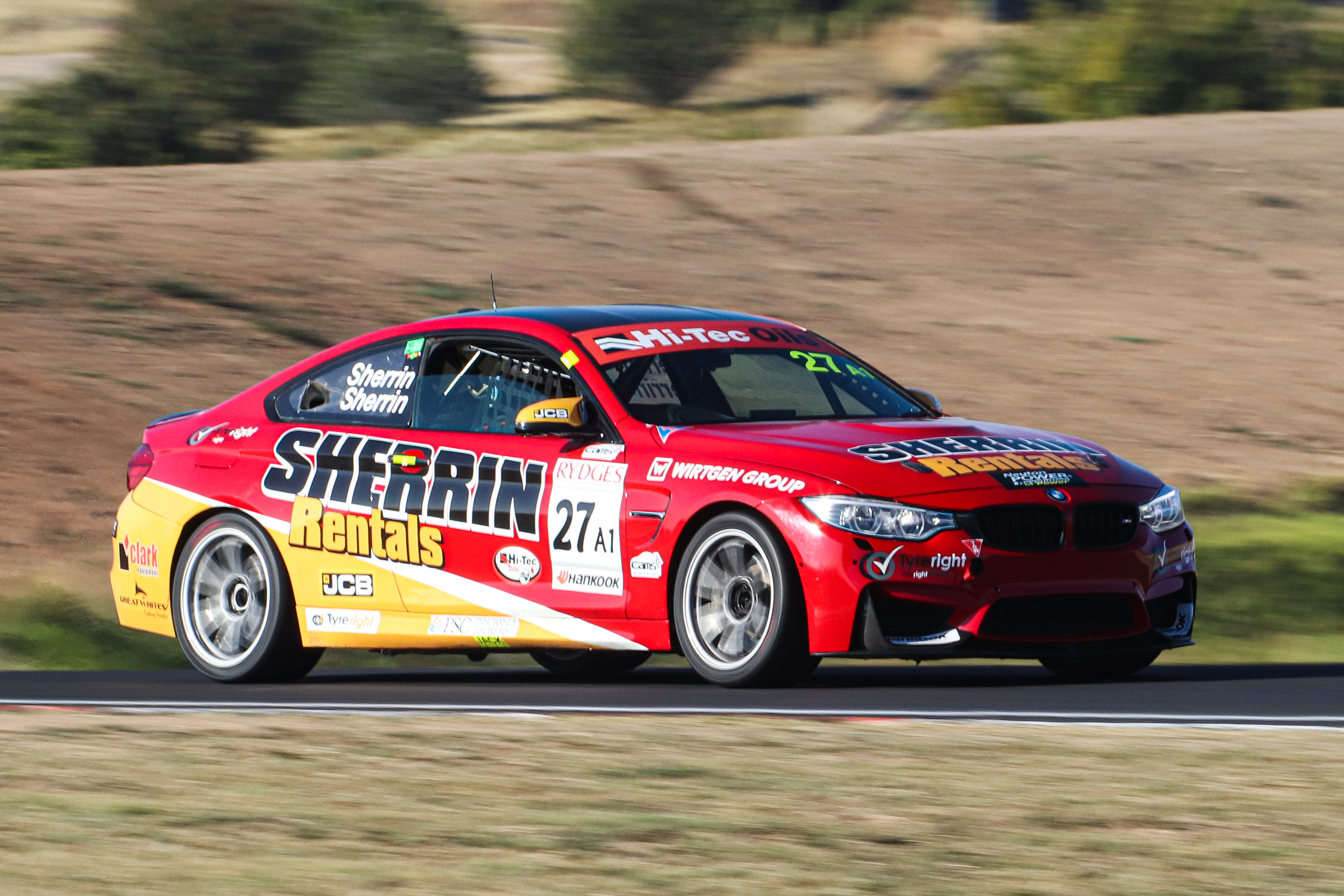
The series was won by Grant Sherrin and Iain Sherrin driving a BMW M4. The above image is from the 2018 Hi-Tec Oils Bathurst 6 Hour

Pos.	Driver	Car	Points
1	Grant Sherrin	BMW M4	409
=	Iain Sherrin	BMW M4	409
2	Bob Pearson	Mitsubishi Lancer Evo 10 RS	367
3	Nathan Morcom	Ford Focus RS	246
4	Dimitri Agathos	Subaru WRX STi	236
=	Lachlan Gibbons	Subaru WRX STi	236
5	Tyler Everingham	Renault Megane RS265	223
6	Rick Bates	Mitsubishi Lancer Evo 10 RS	205
7	Colin Osborne	Renault Megane RS265	195
8	Chaz Mostert	Ford Focus RS	177
9	Rod Salmon	Mitsubishi Lancer Evo 10 RS	176
10	Hadrian Morrall	Renault Megane RS265	140
11	Blake Aubin	Renault Clio	136
=	Scott Gore	BMW 135i	136
12	Calum Jones	Renault Megane RS265	134
13	Chris Lillis	HSV VE GTS	127
14	Nathan Callaghan	HSV VE GTS	115
15	Nathan Antunes	Mercedes-Benz A 45 AMG	96
16	Jason Walsh	Suzuki Swift	81
17	Kylie Aubin	Renault Clio	80
=	Will Brown	Mitsubishi Lancer Evo 10 RS	80
18	Troy Williams	Holden Commodore SSV	77
19	Beric Lynton	BMW M1	75
=	Timothy Leahey	BMW M1	75
20	Michael Sherrin	BMW 135i	71
=	Stephen Champion	BMW 135i	71
21	Gerry Burges	Mitsubishi Lancer Evo 9	70
=	Leigh Burges	Mitsubishi Lancer Evo 9	70
22	Keith Bensley	BMW 135i	65
23	Paul Currie	Suzuki Swift	63
24	Ellexandra Best	Toyota Corolla	62
=	Michael Gray	Toyota Corolla	62
25	Garth Walden	Mercedes-Benz A 45 AMG	60
=	Indiran Padayachee	Mercedes-Benz A 45 AMG	60
=	Mark Eddy	Audi TT RS	60
26	Michael Auld	Holden VE Commodore SSV	56
=	Richard Bloomfield	Holden VE Commodore SSV	56
27	Andrew Bollom	Mazda RX-7	48
=	Dominic Martens	MINI Cooper S JCW	48
=	James Keene	MINI Cooper S JCW	48
=	Ric Shaw	Mazda RX-7	48
28	Amy Griffith	Toyota Echo	41
=	Mark Griffith	Toyota Echo	41
29	Justin Anthony	Mercedes-AMG C 63	39
=	Karl Begg	Mercedes-AMG C 63	39
30	Andrew Turpie	Toyota 86 GTS	38
=	Grant Phillips	Toyota 86 GTS	38
31	Gerry Murphy	BMW M3 E92	35
=	Jim Pollicina	BMW M3 E92	35
32	Daniel Clift	Holden VZ Commodore SS	32
=	Wayne Clift	Holden VZ Commodore SS	32
33	Dean Potts	HSV VY ClubSport	30
34	Brianna Wilson	Nissan Pulsar SSS	27
=	Michael Almond	Renault Megane RS265	27
35	Katilyn Hawkins	Suzuki Swift	21
=	Michael Benton	FPV GT	21
=	Richard Luff	Suzuki Swift	21
=	Tony Hatton	FPV GT	21
36	Scott Turner	BMW 130i	20
=	Todd Hazelwood	BMW 130i	20
37	Gavin Driscoll	Hyundai Getz	19
=	James Goldsbrough	Hyundai Getz	19
38	Mark King	Kia Proceed GT	18
39	Declan Kirkham	Mazda 626	15
=	Michael Hopp	Suzuki Swift Sport	15
=	Philip Kirkham	Mazda 626	15
40	Michael James	HSV VE GTS	14
41	Peter Sortwell	Suzuki Swift Sport	12
=	Vince Ciallella	HSV VE GTS	12
42	Nathan Stephens	Nissan Pulsar SSS	10
43	Lindsay Kearns	Ford Falcon	9
44	Jeff Nielson	Toyota 86	8
=	Michael James	Toyota 86	8
=	Troy Rolley	Toyota 86	8
45	Christian Yates-Round	BMW 130i	3
=	Ryan Epa	Suzuki Swift Sport	3
=	Ryan Suhle	BMW 130i	3
46	Jonathan Bloxsom	Holden Ute	2
=	Kyle Alford	BMW 1M	1

=== Classes ===
Class victories were awarded as follows:

- Class A1: Grant Sherrin & Iain Sherrin
- Class A2: Chris Lillis
- Class B1: Scott Gore
- Class B2: Troy Williams
- Class C: Tyler Everingham
- Class D: Ellexandra Best
- Class E: Jason Walsh
- Class I: Gerry Burges

=== Australian Production Car Cup ===
Outright victory in the Australian Production Car Cup was awarded to Grant Sherrin & Iain Sherrin.
