= 2026 Hi-Tec Oils Bathurst 6 Hour =

Endurance motorsports race in Bathurst, Australia

The 2026 Bathurst 6 Hour (commercially titled the 2026 Hi-Tec Oils Bathurst 6 Hour) was an endurance race for Group 3E Series Production Cars. It was held at the Mount Panorama Circuit, Bathurst, New South Wales, Australia on 5 April 2026 and was promoted and organised by the Australian Racing Group. The race was the tenth annual edition of the Bathurst 6 Hour.

After taking pole position for the event, the GWR Australia BMW M2 Competition entry of Thomas Randle, Michael and Ben Kavich took outright victory, as well as winning the X class division. With this, BMW retained their reign as the only manufacturer to achieve outright victory in the event since its inception in 2016.

== Classes ==
Cars competed in the following classes:

Symbol	Class
X	Ultimate Performance
A1	Extreme Performance Forced Induction
A2	Extreme Performance Naturally Aspirated
B1	High Performance Forced Induction
B2	High Performance Naturally Aspirated
C	Performance
D	Production
E	Compact

== Results ==
Class winners indicated in bold and with ‡.

Pos.	Class	No.	Team	Drivers	Car	Laps	Time/Retired
1	**X**	**92**	**GWR Australia**	**(Australia) Thomas Randle** **(Australia) Michael Kavich** **(Australia) Ben Kavich**	**BMW M2 Competition**	**114**	**06:01:07.9673**
2	**A2**	**6**	**Wheels FX Racing**	**(Australia) Cameron McLeod** **(Papua New Guinea) Keith Kassulke**	**Ford Mustang Mach 1**	**114**	**+ 5.074**
3	A2	64	Cachet Homes	(Australia) Josh Muggleton (Australia) Zach Bates (Australia) Chris Lillis	Chevrolet Camaro 2SS	114	+ 5.726
4	A2	54	Tamborine Mountain Nursery	(Australia) Tony Alford (Australia) Kyle Alford (Australia) Tim Slade	Ford Mustang Mach 1	114	+ 6.656
5	X	1	DA Campbell Transport	(Australia) Cameron Hill (Australia) Dean Campbell	BMW M2 Competition	114	+ 14.156
6	A2	9	Parramatta Vehicle Services	(Australia) Tyler Mecklem (Australia) Hadrian Morrall	Ford Mustang Mach 1	114	+ 14.235
7	**A1**	**140**	**Loiacono / Holzl Racing**	**(Australia) Oliver Loiacono** **(Australia) Alex Holzl**	**Mitsubishi Lancer Evolution X**	**114**	**+ 29.755**
8	A1	99	Waltec Motorsport	(Australia) Cam Laws (Australia) Cody Gillis (Australia) Leon Cordato	BMW M2 F87	114	+ 36.302
9	X	90	Flipside Entry	(Australia) Amar Sharma (Australia) Grant Johnson (Australia) Jack Le Brocq	BMW M3 Competition	114	+ 1:10.384
10	X	115	VSP	(Australia) Zaki Wazir (Australia) Tim Shaw (Australia) Ric Shaw	BMW M4 F82	113	+ 1 lap
11	A2	48	ASAP Marketing Pty Ltd	(Australia) Steve Owen (Australia) Scott Gore	Lexus RCF	113	+ 1 lap
12	A1	143	A1 Towing Bathurst	(Australia) Grant Inwood (Australia) Harry Inwood (Australia) Darcy Inwood	BMW 1M E82	113	+ 1 lap
13	A1	67	Scott's Rods Motorsport	(Australia) Scott Green (Australia) Steven Pilkington	Mitsubishi Lancer Evolution X	113	+ 1 lap
14	A1	88	GRW Racing	(Australia) Graeme Wakefield (Australia) Craig Allan (Australia) Martin White	Mitsubishi Lancer Evolution X	112	+ 2 laps
15	**B1**	**999**	**Tyres and More Hemmant**	**(Australia) Karlie Buccini** **(Australia) Courtney Prince** **(Australia) Tabitha Ambrose**	**BMW 340i**	**112**	**+ 2 laps**
16	**B2**	**19**	**Axis Surveys**	**(Australia) Richard Shinkfield** **(Australia) Andrew Milford** **(Australia) Chris Holdt**	**BMW M3 E92**	**112**	**+ 2 laps**
17	**C**	**50**	**MWM Racing**	**(Australia) James Keene** **(Australia) Trevor Keene**	**VW Golf R (Mk6)**	**112**	**+ 2 laps**
18	X	21	Secure Wealth	(Australia) Simon Hodges (Australia) Jayden Ojeda	BMW M4 F82	111	+ 3 laps
20	B2	42	Team Virag Racing	(Australia) Michael Ferns (Australia) Tony Virag (Australia) Liam Evans	Holden Commodore (VF)	110	+ 4 laps
21	A1	57	Hire Express	(Australia) Stephen Thompson (Australia) Ed Kreamer	Mitsubishi Lancer Evolution X	110	+ 4 laps
22	A2	13	Tamworth City Accident Repairs	(Australia) Gregory Keam (Australia) Justin Matthews	Ford Mustang GT	110	+ 4 laps
23	**D**	**2**	**DJA Mechanics**	**(Australia) Michael Hazelton** **(Australia) Andrew McMaster** **(Australia) Richard Buttrose**	**BMW i125**	**110**	**+ 4 laps**
24	D	85	Whittaker Packaging Solutions	(Australia) Nick Winsor (Australia) Brendan Whittaker (Australia) Chris Whittaker	Toyota 86 GTS	110	+ 4 laps
25	D	55	Fifth Gear Motoring	(Australia) Daniel Flanagan (Australia) Dean Chapman (Australia) Caleb Hefren	Subaru BRZ	110	+ 4 laps
26	**E**	**161**	**161 Racing**	**(Australia) Ruben Dan** **(Australia) Ashton Sieders** **(Australia) Calvin Gardner**	**Mazda 3 SP25**	**110**	**+ 4 laps**
27	A1	73	Brown Davis Motorsport	(Australia) Lee Partridge (Australia) David Brown (Australia) Jamie Westaway	Ford Focus RS	109	+ 5 laps
28	A2	195	Simford Group	(Australia) Dale Carpenter (Australia) Joel Stafford (Australia) Troy Gleeson	HSV Clubsport R8	109	+ 5 laps
29	E	20	Team Ultra Tune	(Australia) Carter Fox (Australia) Adam Brewer (Australia) Manny Mezzasalma	Mazda 3 SP25	109	+ 5 laps
30	D	80	Managed Waste Services/McDonalds	(South Africa) Stiaan Kriel (Australia) David Murphy (Australia) Steven King	Mazda RX-8 Series 1	109	+ 5 laps
31	A2	888	Clean and Wash	(Australia) Ian McLennan (Australia) Rohit Saini	HSV GTS VE2	108	+ 6 laps
32	A1	61	Team BRM	(Australia) Jordan Ormsby (Australia) Julian Newton (Australia) Antoni Ormsby	Mitsubishi Lancer Evolution X	108	+ 6 laps
33	D	15	RPM86	(Australia) Ashwin Dyall (Australia) Tony Prior	Toyota 86 GTS	108	+ 6 laps
34	C	4	PB Motorsport Services	(Australia) Andrew Martin (Australia) Tony Auddino	HSV VXR	108	+ 6 laps
35	B1	33	DRS Racing	(Australia) David Worrell (Australia) Scott Walker (Australia) Richard Luff	Kia Stinger 330 GT	108	+ 6 laps
36	D	82	Maisie Place Motorsport	(Australia) Jake Lougher (Australia) Garry Lougher (Australia) Manarth Prasad	Mazda RX-8 Series 1	107	+ 7 laps
37	E	53	RaceAway Track Time	(Australia) Rod Tippett (Australia) Paul Hewitt (Australia) Phillip Alexander	Mazda 3 SP25	106	+ 8 laps
38	B1	105	MILKLAB/Robert Bryden Lawyers	(Australia) Aaron Zerefos (Australia) John Fitzgerald (Australia) Robert Bryden	BMW 135i	105	+ 9 laps
39	B2	3	Townsend Signs	(Australia) Ian Joyce (Australia) Scott Tidyman	Holden SSV CL Edition	104	+ 10 laps
40	D	185	MC Corsa	(Australia) William Powers (Australia) Adnan Sibai (Australia) Tommy Roso	Toyota GT86 GTS	104	+ 10 laps
41	C	78	Atlantic Oils/Crosby Conveyancing	(Australia) Oskar Butt (Australia) Troy Derwent (Australia) Matt Dicinoski	HSV VXR	104	+ 10 laps
42	X	23	Bridgestone Helensvale	(Australia) Will Davison (Australia) Tim Leahey (Australia) Beric Lynton	BMW M3 F80	102	+ 12 laps
43	A1	91	Wahlstrom Financial Services	(Australia) Mitchell Randall (Australia) Chris Gunther (Australia) Paul Morris	Mercedes-Benz AMG A45	98	+ 16 laps
44	A1	222	Harding Performance Racing	(Australia) Cem Yucel (Australia) Iain Salteri	Volkswagen Golf Mk8	97	+ 17 laps
45	D	5	PremiAir Racing	(Australia) Douglas Westwood (Australia) Chad Parrish (Australia) Peter Xiberras	Toyota GR86	97	+ 17 laps
46	E	696	Autosport Engineering	(Australia) Greg Boyle (Australia) Brett Stevens	Honda Accord Euro CL9	91	+ 22 laps
47	D	17	Scott Property Group	(Australia) Robert Scott (Australia) David Cox	Mazda RX-8 Series 1	91	+ 22 laps
Ret	X	60	Speedcafe/Simplex Elevators	(Australia) Oscar Targett (Australia) Maika Ter Horst (Australia) Robert Gooley	BMW M4 F82	109	Overheating
Ret	D	83	Maisie Place Motorsport	(Australia) Hayden Jackson (Australia) Grant Bray (Australia) Matthew Totani	Mazda RX-8 Series 1	108	Retired
Ret	A1	71	Tyres and More Hemmant	(Australia) Glen Ebert (Australia) Paul Buccini (Australia) Michael von Rappard	BMW M240i	104	Accident
Ret	B2	86	Osborn's Transport	(Australia) Joel Heinrich (Australia) Brett Osborn (Australia) Jarrod Harber	BMW M3 E92	88	Lost wheel
Ret	D	70	Rob Jarvis Transport	(Australia) Allan Jarvis (Australia) Rob Jarvis	Volkswagen Polo Gti	85	Retired
Ret	D	125	MC Corsa	(Australia) Edan Thornburrow (Australia) Brent Wilson (Australia) Charlie Khoury	Toyota 86 GTS	80	Accident
Ret	C	84	AC Store	(Australia) James Hay (Australia) Paul Ansell (Australia) Richard Barram	VW Scirocco R	71	Accident
Ret	A2	101	Keltic Racing	(Australia) Ryder Quinn (United Kingdom) Tony Quinn (Australia) Grant Denyer	Chevrolet Camaro 2SS	71	Accident
Ret	D	128	ADR Globello / All Access Hire	(Australia) Luke Vanna (Australia) Emily Caccaviello (Australia) Aston Davis	Subaru BRZ	62	Retired
Ret	A2	16	Moma Solar Lighting	(Australia) Anthony Levitt (Australia) Daniel Natoli	Mercedes-AMG C63	61	Retired
Ret	X	24	GWR Australia	(Australia) Michael Auld (Australia) Hayden Auld (Australia) Tyler Everingham	BMW M3 F80	60	Fuel leak
Ret	A2	89	Braydan Willmington Motorsports	(Australia) Braydan Willmington (Australia) John Bowe (Australia) Brianna Wilson	Ford Mustang Mach 1	59	Gearbox
Ret	A2	30	Gomersall Motorsport	(Australia) Aaron Seton (Australia) Jason Gomersall (Australia) Ben Gomersall	Ford Mustang Mach 1	58	Accident
Ret	E	76	Autosport Engineering	(Australia) Matthew Southwell (Australia) Richard Mork (Australia) Zach Dunn	Mazda 3 SP25	51	Retired
Ret	X	10	Link Signs	(Australia) Brandon Madden (Australia) Brock Biblin	HSV VF GTS	50	Retired
Ret	C	43	Champ Group	(Australia) Tristan Ellery (Australia) Steve McHugh (Australia) Josh Smith	HSV VXR	45	Retired
Ret	B2	323	Randall Industries	(Australia) Lachlan Mineeff (Australia) Drew Russell (Australia) Peter Lawrence	BMW M3	30	Retired
Ret	E	35	RaceAway Track Time	(Australia) Jake Hextell (Australia) Gino Manley (Australia) Matthew Kiss	Mazda 3 SP25	27	Fuel pump
Ret	D	77	Rob Jarvis Racing	(Australia) Brock Stinson (Australia) Lachlan Platten (Australia) Annabelle Rolfo	Volkswagen Polo GTI	20	Engine
Ret	A1	32	LUXE Performance	(Australia) Zoe Woods (Australia) Mark Griffith	Mercedes-AMG A45	16	Suspension
Ret	A2	51	IES Motorsport	(Australia) Tyler Cheney (Australia) Ryan MacMillan (Australia) Tim Brook	Ford Mustang Mach 1	2	Engine
Ret	A2	18	Ultimate Diesel Tuning	(Australia) Bryce Fullwood (Australia) Trent Whyte (Australia) Cooper Barnes	Ford Mustang Mach 1	2	Retired
