= 2018 Hi-Tec Oils Bathurst 6 Hour =

Motor racing competition

Layout of the Mount Panorama Circuit

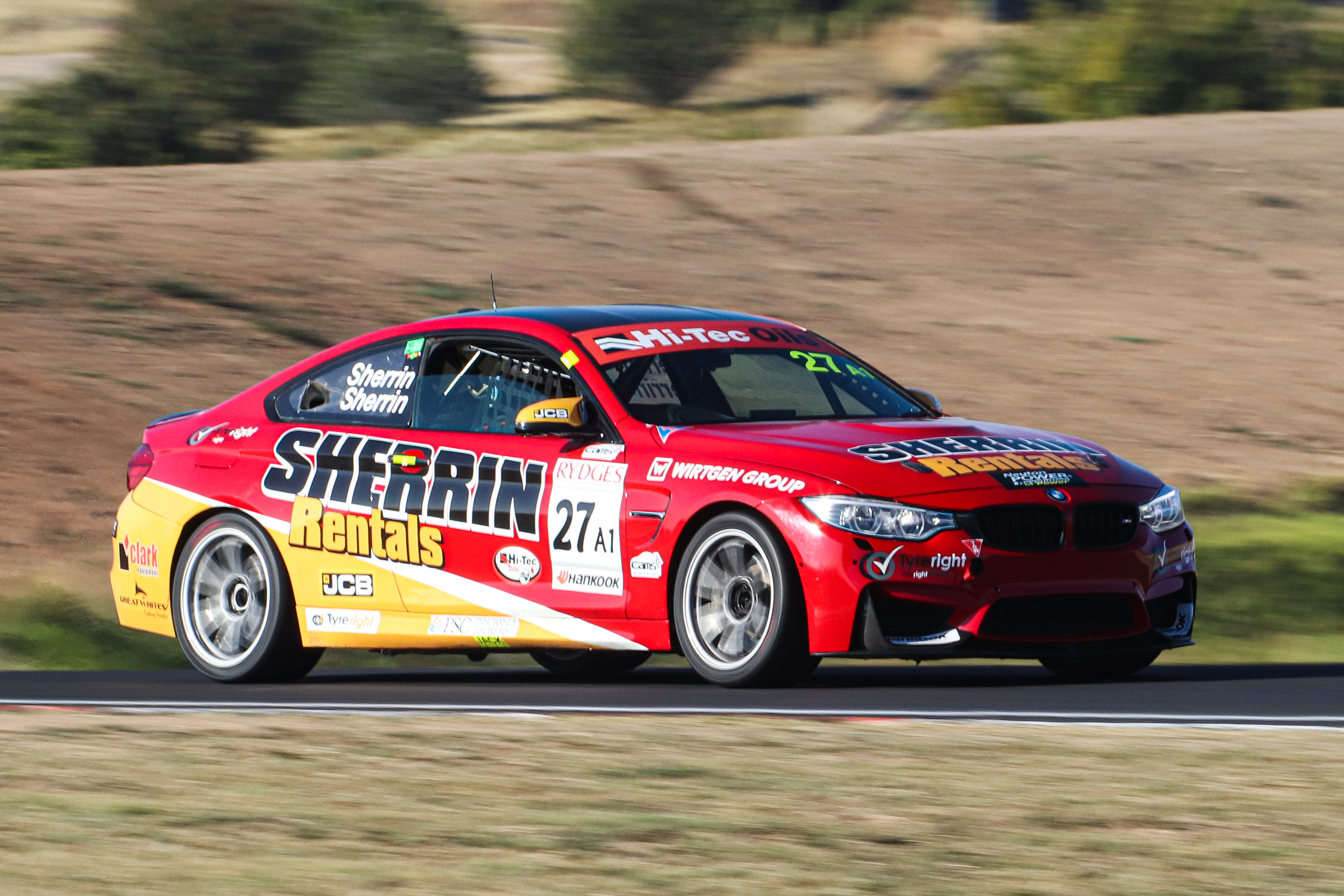
The race and Class A1-winning BMW M4 F82 of Grant and Iain Sherrin.

The 2018 Hi-Tec Oils Bathurst 6 Hour was an endurance race for Group 3E Series Production Cars. The event, which was staged at the Mount Panorama Circuit, near Bathurst, in New South Wales, Australia, on 1 April 2018, was the third running of the Bathurst 6 Hour. The race was won by Grant and Iain Sherrin, driving a BMW M4 F82.

== Class structure ==
Cars competed in the following classes:

- Class A1: Extreme Performance (Forced Induction)
- Class A2: Extreme Performance (Naturally Aspirated)
- Class B1: High Performance (Forced Induction)
- Class B2: High Performance (Naturally Aspirated)
- Class C: Performance
- Class D: Production
- Class E: Compact

== Results ==
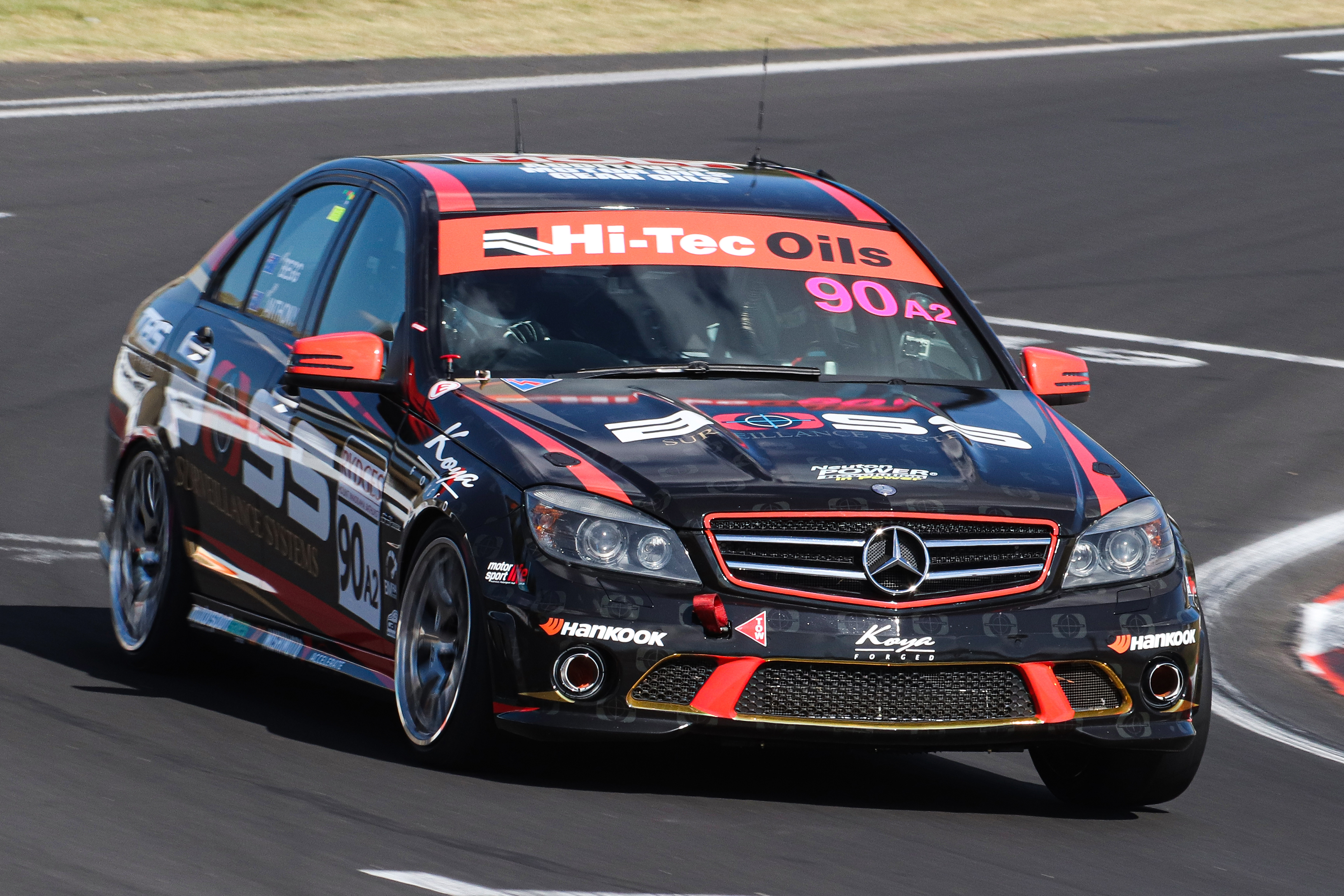
The Class A2-winning Mercedes-Benz C63 AMG W204 of Karl Begg and Justin Anthony.

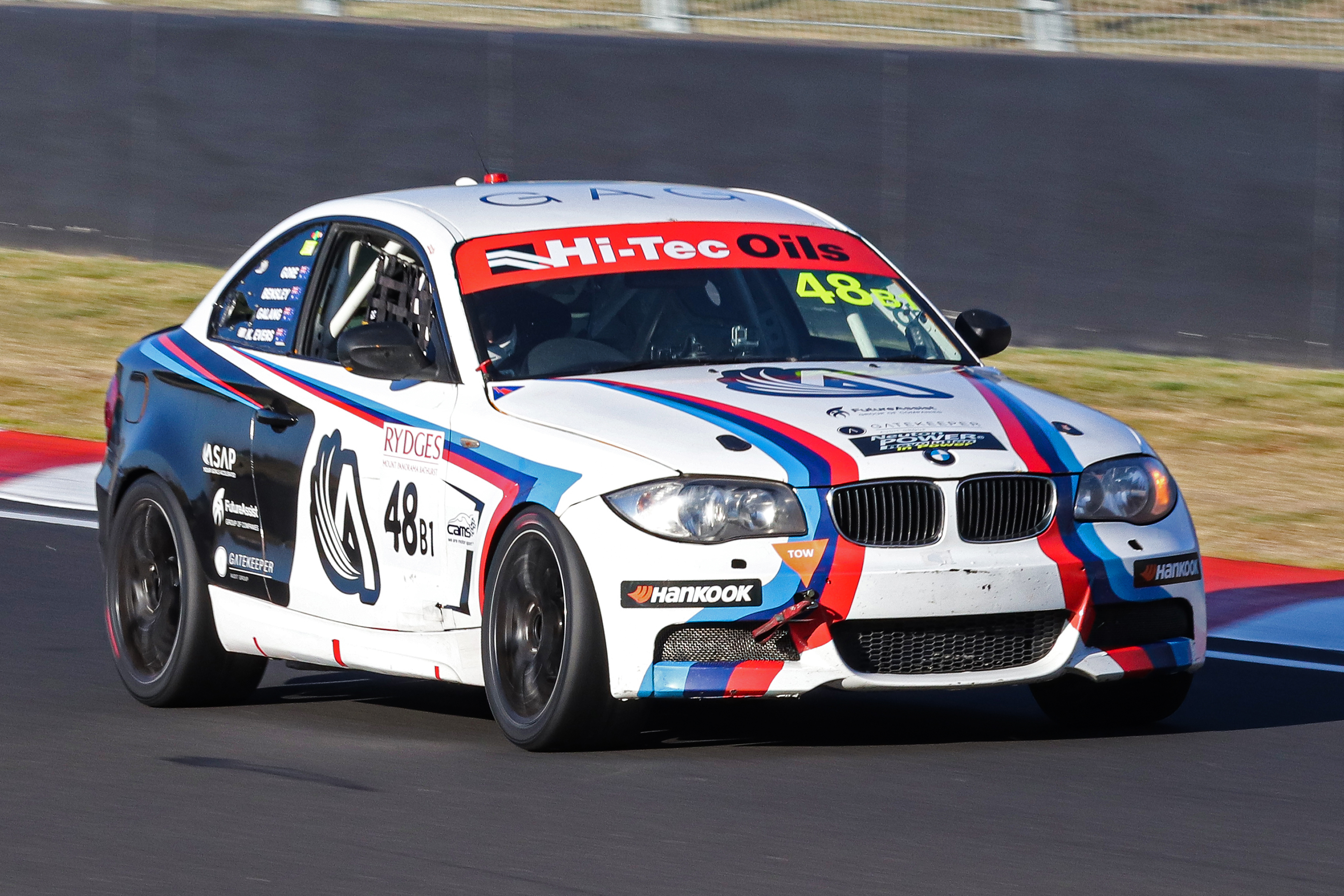
The Class B1-winning BMW 135i E82 of Scott Gore, Keith Bensley and Patrick Galang.

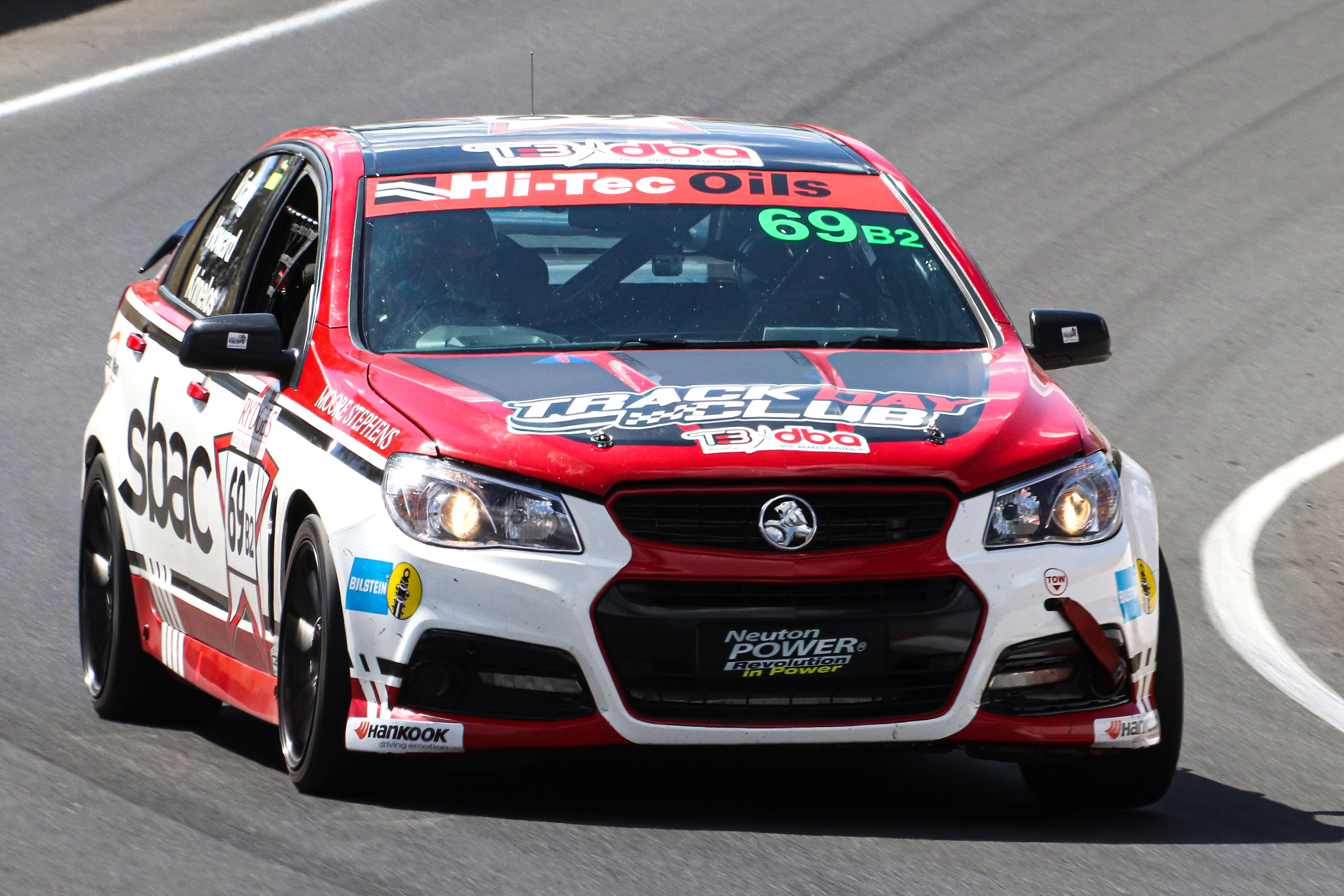
The Class B2-winning Holden Commodore VF SS-V Redline of Joe Krinelos, Tony Virag and Brett Howard.

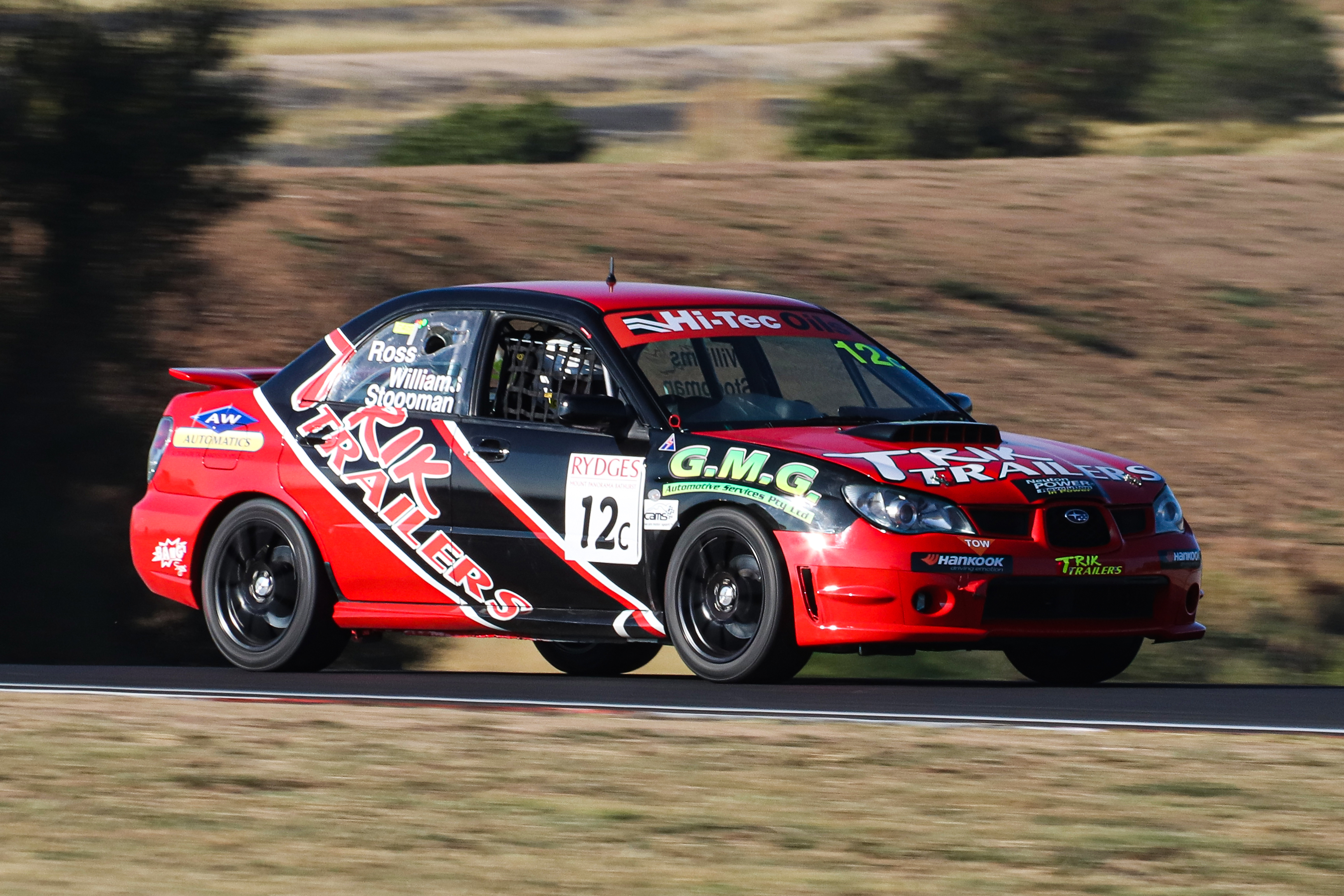
The Class C-winning Subaru Impreza WRX of Kevin Stoopman, Andrew Williams and Gavin Ross.

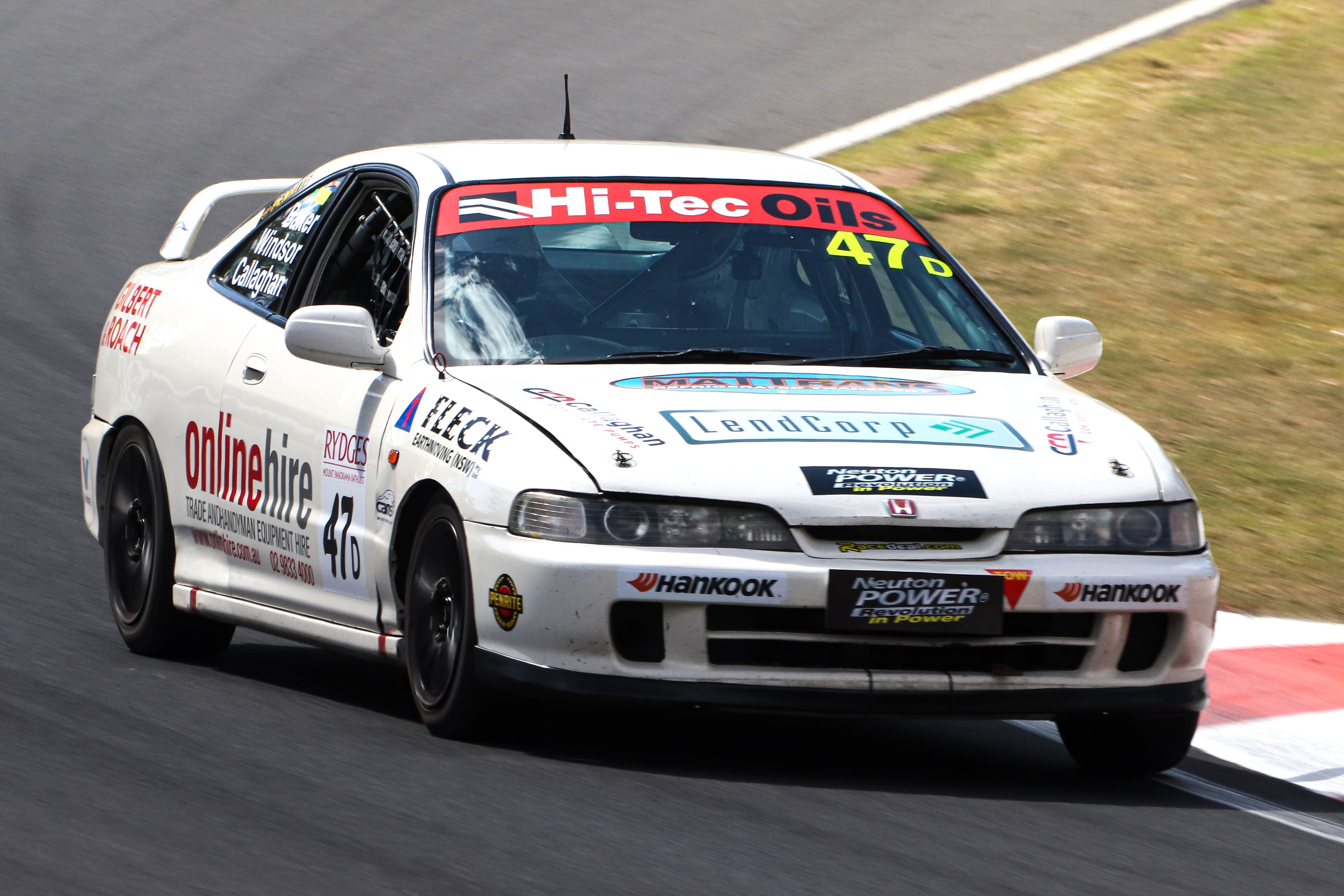
The Class D-winning Honda Integra Type R DC2 of David Baker, Matthew Windsor and Brian Callaghan.

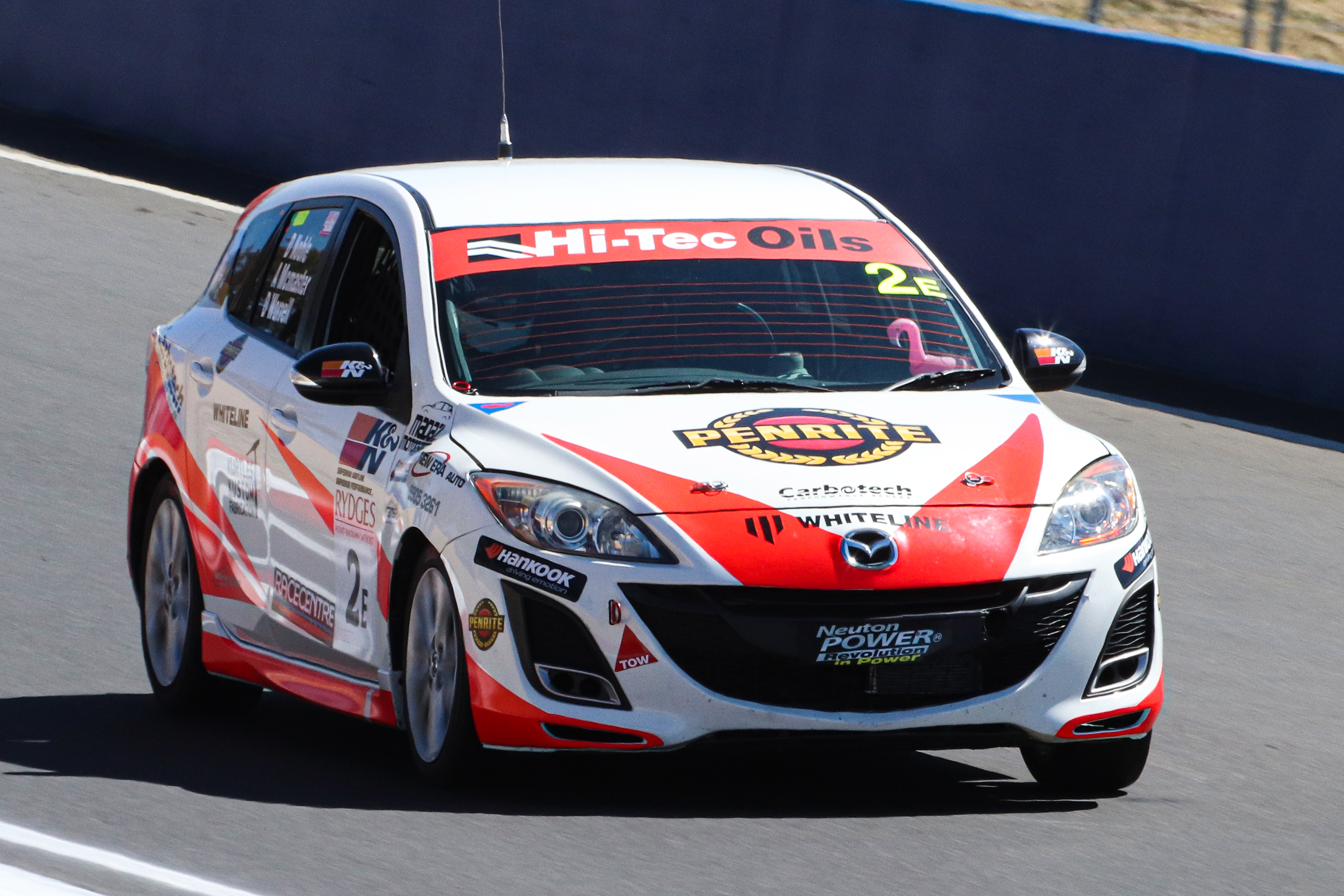
The Class E-winning Mazda 3 SP25 of Andrew McMaster, David Noble and David Worrell.

Pos.	Class	No.	Drivers	Entrant	Car	Laps
1	**A1**	**27**	**(Australia) Grant Sherrin (Australia) Iain Sherrin**	**Sherrin Rentals**	**BMW M4 F82**	**109**
2	A1	5	(United States) Daren Jorgensen (United States) Brett Strom	RHC Jorgensen-Strom by MARC Cars	BMW 1 Series M Coupé E82	109
3	A1	29	(Australia) Rob Woods (Australia) Marcel Zalloua (Australia) Steven Johnson	Commercial Interior Projects	Mercedes-Benz A 45 AMG	109
4	A1	6	(Australia) Rod Salmon (Australia) Leigh Burges	Aqualuma Racing	Mercedes-Benz A 45 AMG	109
5	A1	14	(Australia) Paul Loiacono (Australia) Peter Lown (Australia) Jimmy Vernon	Fibre 15	Mitsubishi Lancer Evolution X RS	109
6	A1	45	(Australia) Garth Walden (New Zealand) Craig Baird	Transtar Linehaul	Mercedes-Benz A 45 AMG	108
7	**A2**	**90**	**(Australia) Karl Begg (Australia) Justin Anthony**	**Boss Surveillance Systems**	**Mercedes-Benz C63 AMG W204**	**108**
8	A1	67	(Australia) Jeremy Gray (Australia) George Miedecke	JMG Racing	FPV FG GT-F	108
9	A2	64	(Australia) Christopher Lillis (Australia) Nathan Callaghan	Cachet Homes Motorsport	HSV E Series GTS	108
10	**B2**	**69**	**(Australia) Joe Krinelos (Australia) Tony Virag (Australia) Brett Howard**	**Sydney Building Approval Centre**	**Holden Commodore VF SS-V Redline**	**107**
11	**B1**	**48**	**(Australia) Scott Gore (Australia) Keith Bensley (Australia) Patrick Galang**	**ASAP Marketing**	**BMW 135i E82**	**107**
12	A1	53	(Australia) Brad Schumacher (Australia) Michael Anderson	Kelso Electrical	Subaru Impreza WRX STI	107
13	A1	93	(Australia) Aaron Tebb (Australia) Jason Miller	Stokes Ski Australia/Waltec Motorsport	Mitsubishi Lancer Evolution IX RS	107
14	B1	8	(Australia) Bradley Carr (Australia) Lindsay Kearns	SubaruDoctor.com	Subaru Impreza WRX STI	107
15	A1	15	(Australia) Michael Kavich (Australia) Ben Kavich (New Zealand) Daniel Gaunt	Race For A Cure/Breast Cancer Trials	Mitsubishi Lancer Evolution X RS	107
16	A1	11	(Australia) Nathan Morcom (Australia) Chaz Mostert	Direct Plasterboard Outlet	Ford Focus RS	106
17	A1	25	(Australia) Simon Hodges (Australia) Kane Coleman	Secure Wealth Advisers	BMW M135i Hatch F20	106
18	A1	66	(Australia) Dimitri Agathos (Australia) Lachlan Gibbons	Nova Employment/FullGas Racing	Subaru Impreza WRX STI	106
19	**C**	**12**	**(Australia) Kevin Stoopman (Australia) Andrew Williams (Australia) Gavin Ross**	**Trik Trailers**	**Subaru Impreza WRX**	**106**
20	A1	92	(Australia) Stephen Thompson (Australia) Ed Kreamer	Allworth Homes	Mitsubishi Lancer Evolution X RS	106
21	**D**	**47**	**(Australia) David Baker (Australia) Matthew Windsor (Australia) Brian Callaghan**	**Online Hire Pty Ltd**	**Honda Integra Type R DC2**	**106**
22	B1	50	(Australia) Trevor Keene (Australia) James Keen (Australia) Dominic Martens	MidWest Multimedia	Volkswagen Golf R	106
23	A1	4	(Australia) Anthony Soole (Australia) Andrew Fisher	Property Investment Store	BMW 1 Series M Coupé E82	105
24	D	52	(Australia) Graeme Heath (Australia) Joshua Heath	Homegas - Race Away Track Time	Toyota 86 GT	105
25	B1	57	(Australia) Brett McFarland (Australia) Nikkolas Hough	B.A.R. Constructions	Subaru Impreza WRX STI	104
26	C	17	(New Zealand) Blake Aubin (Australia) Kyle Aubin	McDonalds Bathurst	Renault Mégane RS 265	104
27	D	3	(Australia) Ellexandra Best (Australia) Michael Gray (Australia) Ken Filbey	L2P Road Ready	Toyota Corolla Sportivo	101
28	D	95	(Australia) Gavan Reynolds (Australia) Christopher Manning (Australia) Declan Fraser	Reynolds Auctions	Toyota 86 GTS	100
29	A1	7	(Australia) Michael King (Australia) Graeme Cox (Australia) Jordan Cox	Cox Automotive Steering & Suspension	Mitsubishi Lancer Evolution X RS	100
30	A1	83	(Australia) Daniel Stutterd (Australia) Steve Owen	Hi-Tec Oils	Mitsubishi Lancer Evolution IX RS	99
31	**E**	**2**	**(Australia) Andrew McMaster (Australia) David Noble (Australia) David Worrell**	**Madaz Motorsport**	**Mazda 3 SP25**	**98**
32	C	98	(Australia) Daniel Sugden (Australia) Jake Williams	Finch Financial	BMW M3 E36	98
33	D	84	(Australia) Jason Walsh (Australia) Mark King (Australia) Kurt Macready	Disc Brakes Australia	Kia Pro Cee'd GT	96
34	E	55	(Australia) Michael Hopp (Australia) Peter Sortwell (Australia) Steve Pittman	HARE Engineering	Suzuki Swift Sport RS416	95
35	E	87	(Australia) James Goldsbrough (Australia) Gavin Driscoll	Free Spirit Tattoo	Hyundai Getz	95
36	C	20	(Australia) Peter Lacey (Australia) Robin Lacey (Australia) Matilda Mravicic	ozEtees/Gold Coast Embroidery	Volkswagen Scirocco R	93
37	E	96	(Australia) Cam Yucel (Australia) Adam Casuccio	Double J Auto Repairs	Nissan Pulsar N15	91
38	C	13	(Australia) Colin Osborne (Australia) Hadrian Morrall	Osborne Motorsport	Renault Mégane RS 265	89
39	E	77	(Australia) Brianna Wilson (Australia) Matthew Boylan (Australia) Nathan Stephens	FullGas Racing	Nissan Pulsar N15	81
40	B2	24	(Australia) Brian Walden (Australia) Michael Auld (Australia) Richard Bloomfield	HPS Transport/Airtag	Holden Commodore VE SS-V Redline	80
41	C	73	(Australia) Brent Edwards (Australia) Matthew Thewlis (Australia) David Bailey	Truck Phones/Sparesbox/Car Finance 4 You	BMW 130i E87	76
DNF	A1	23	(Australia) Beric Lynton (Australia) Tim Leahey	Beric Lynton Jaguar Land Rover	BMW M3 F80 Competition	101
DNF	E	19	(Australia) Mark Griffith (Australia) Kyle Alford	HOGS/Griffith Corp	Toyota Echo	97
DNF	A2	16	(Australia) Stephen Hodges (Australia) Robert Coulthard	Hi-Tec Oils/Smith & Sons	CSV Mondo GT	83
DNF	C	10	(Australia) David Raddatz (Australia) Kirt Metcalf	MX5 Mania/Yellowspeed Racing Australia	Alfa Romeo Giulietta	80
DNF	D	97	(Australia) Liam McAdam (Australia) Nicholas Carroll	Phil Gilbert Parts	Toyota 86 GT	71
DNF	A2	51	(Australia) Daniel Flangan (Australia) Merrick Malouf	Goodyear Phillip/Prime Finance/Fifth Gear	HSV VY GTS	63
DNF	A2	44	(Australia) Daniel Clift (Australia) Wayne Clift (Australia) Ashley Heffernan	Nolan Finishes	HSV VZ Clubsport R8	58
DNF	B2	40	(Australia) James Herington (Australia) Matthew O'Brien (Australia) Paul Wilbow	Commodore Shop Cardiff	Holden Commodore VE SS-V Redline	41
DNF	A1	65	(Australia) Jack Winter (Australia) Zac Raddatz	Yellow Speed Racing Australia	Mitsubishi Lancer Evolution IX RS	40
DNF	A2	18	(Australia) Graeme Muir (Australia) Jamie Hodgson	Gramur Stainless	HSV E Series GTS	39
DNF	C	31	(Australia) Callum Jones (Australia) Geoffrey Full (Australia) Tyler Everingham	Osborne Motorsport	Renault Mégane RS 265	38
DNF	A1	68	(Australia) Dylan Thomas (Australia) Tim Slade	Hi-Tec Oils	Mitsubishi Lancer Evolution IX RS	30
DNF	A1	56	(Australia) Mark Eddy (Australia) Tony Alford	Mark Eddy Racing	Audi TT RS	27
DNF	A2	71	(Australia) Warren Trewin (Australia) Scott Cameron	Wounded Heroes Racing	HSV VZ Clubsport R8	27
DNF	A1	81	(Australia) Wade Scott (Australia) Robert Gooley	Ownit Homes/Ultimate Diesel Tuning	Mitsubishi Lancer Evolution VIII RS	21

- Class winners are shown in bold text.
- Race time of winning car: 6:01:42.874
- Pole position: 2:22.904, Tim Leahey
- Fastest race lap: 2:26.027, Tim Leahey
