= 2016 Hi-Tec Oils Bathurst 6 Hour =

Motor racing competition

Seasons
- ← none 2017 →

Layout of the Mount Panorama Circuit

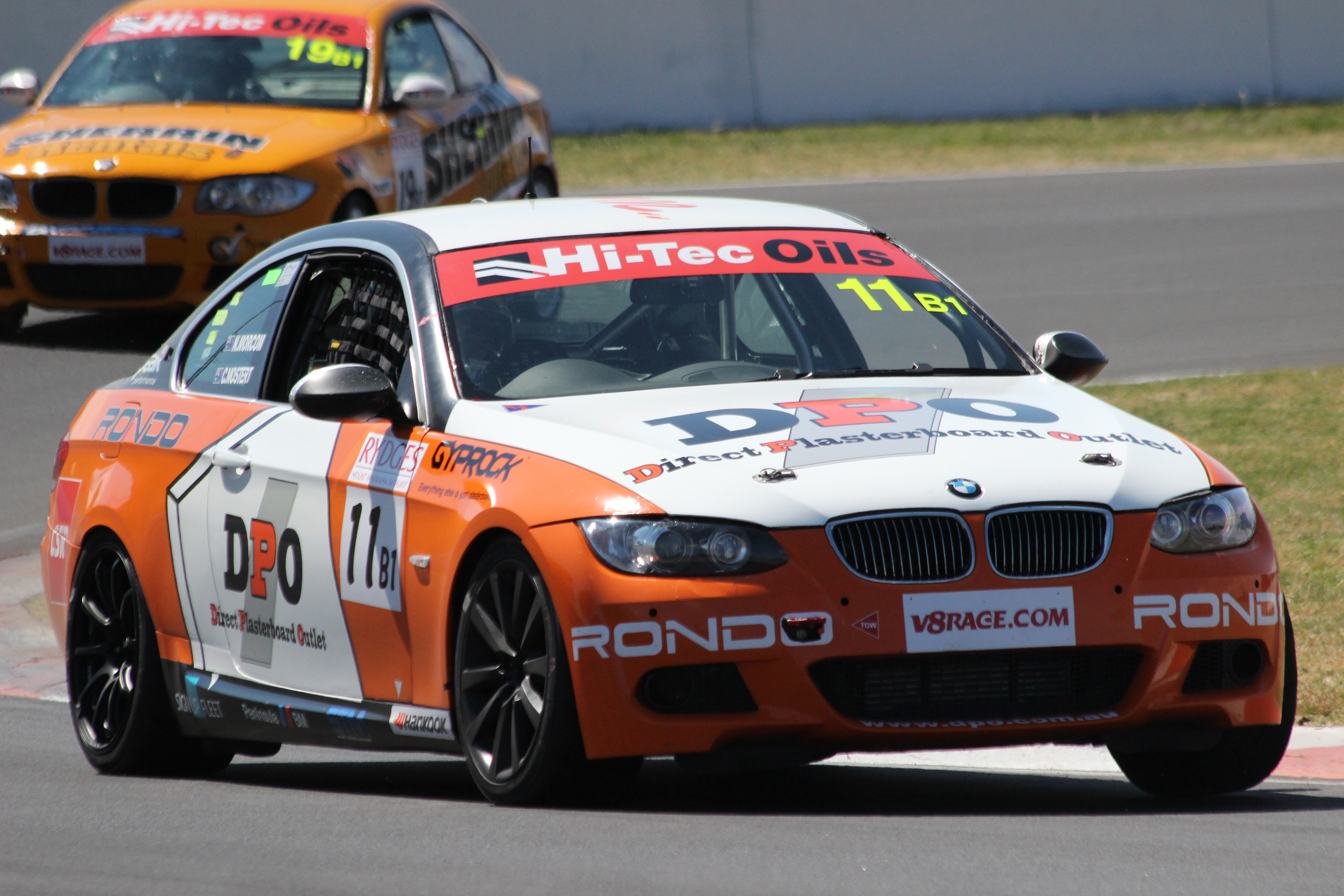
The race and Class B1-winning BMW 335i E92 of Nathan Morcom and Chaz Mostert.

The 2016 Hi-Tec Oils Bathurst 6 Hour was an endurance race for Group 3E Series Production Cars and other invited cars. The event, which was staged at the Mount Panorama Circuit, near Bathurst, in New South Wales, Australia, on 27 March 2016, was the first running of the Bathurst 6 Hour.

The race was won by Nathan Morcom and Chaz Mostert, driving a BMW 335i E92.

== Class structure ==
Cars competed in the following classes:

- Class A1: Extreme Performance (Forced Induction)
- Class A2: Extreme Performance (Naturally Aspirated)
- Class B1: High Performance (Forced Induction)
- Class B2: High Performance (Naturally Aspirated)
- Class C: Performance
- Class D: Production
- Class E: Compact
- Class I: Invitational

== Results ==
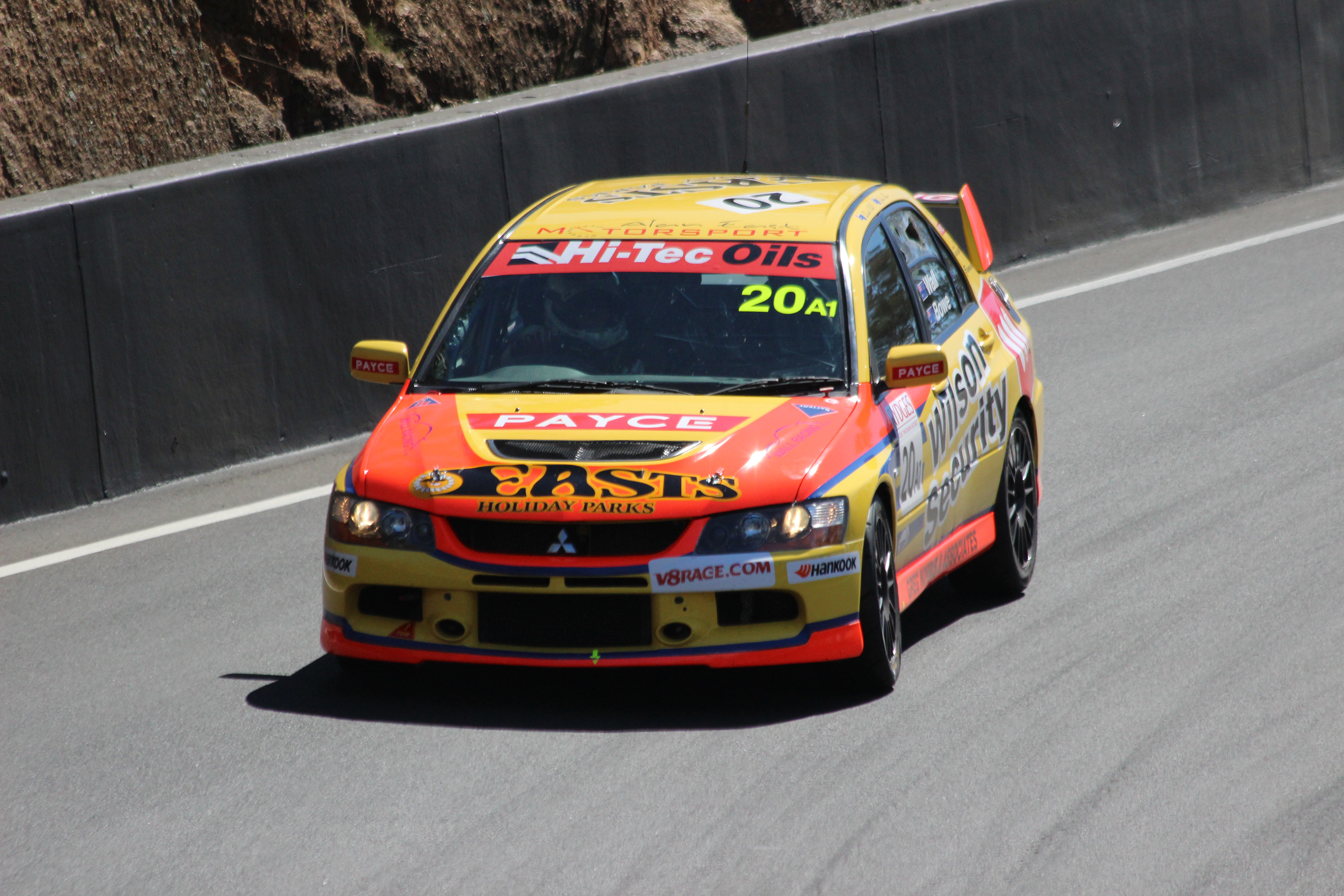
The Class A1-winning Mitsubishi Lancer Evolution IX RS of David Wall and John Bowe.

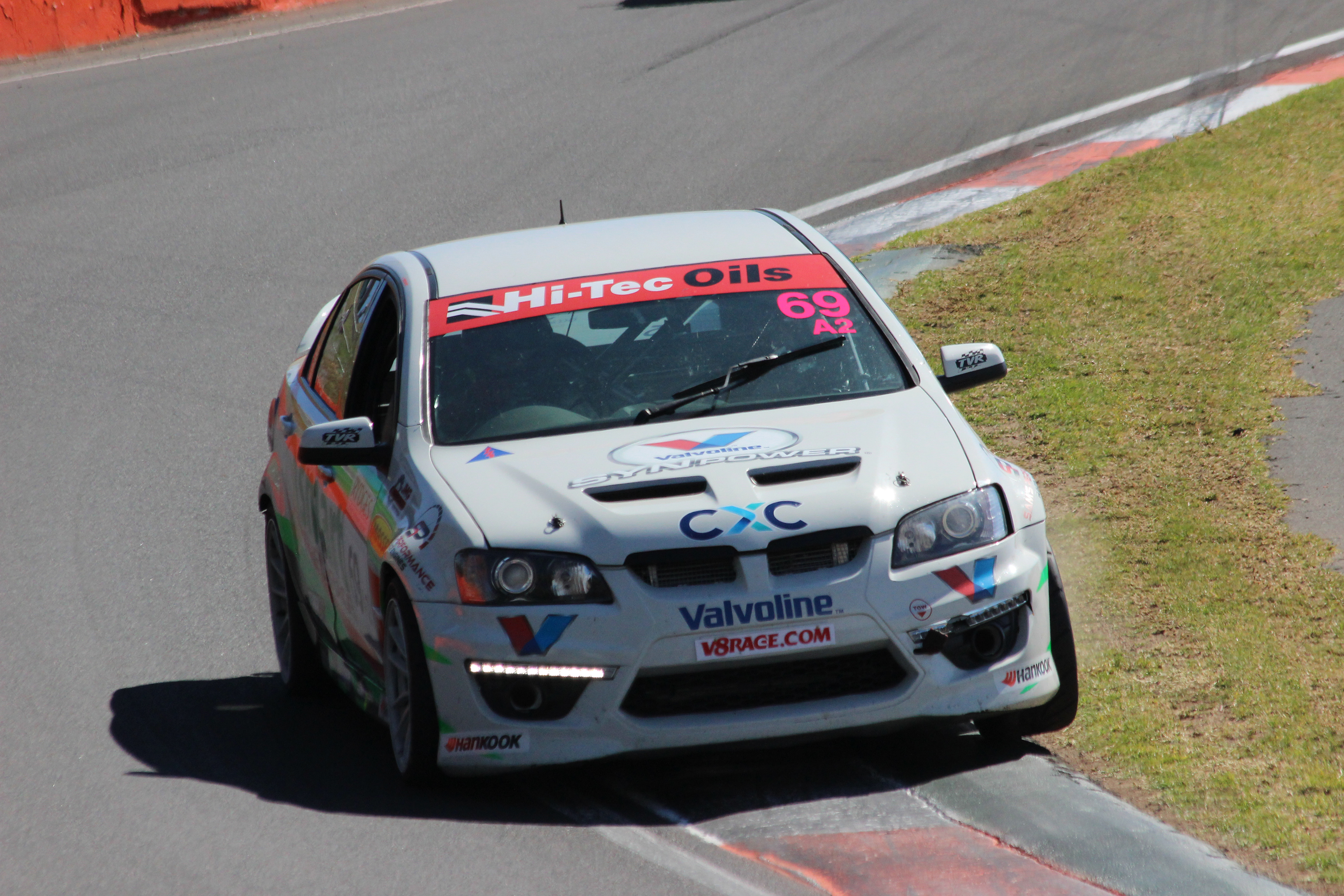
The Class A2-winning HSV E Series GTS of Tony Virag, Jeremy Gray and Warren Millett.

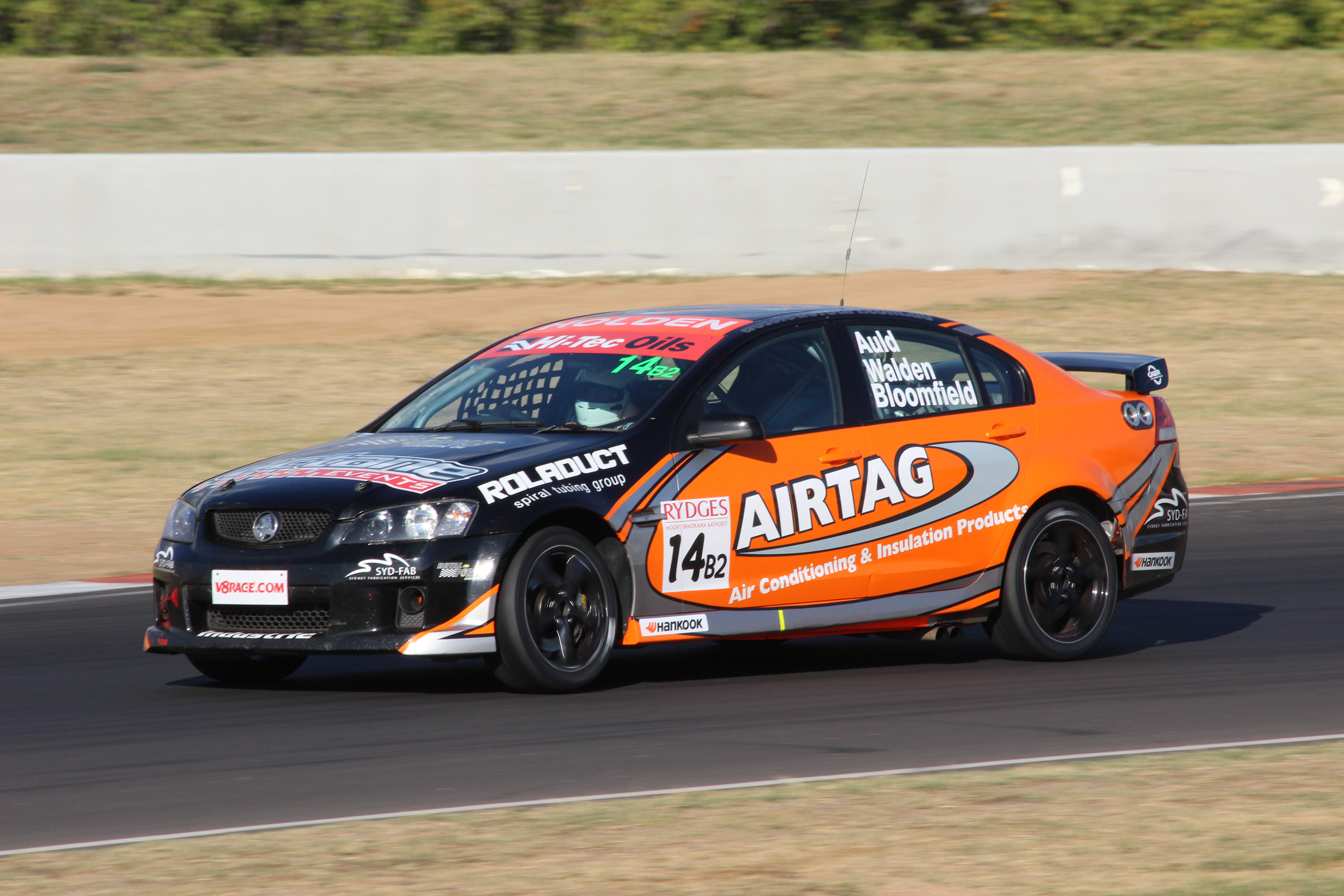
The Class B2-winning Holden VE Commodore SS of Brian Walden, Michael Auld and Richard Bloomfield.

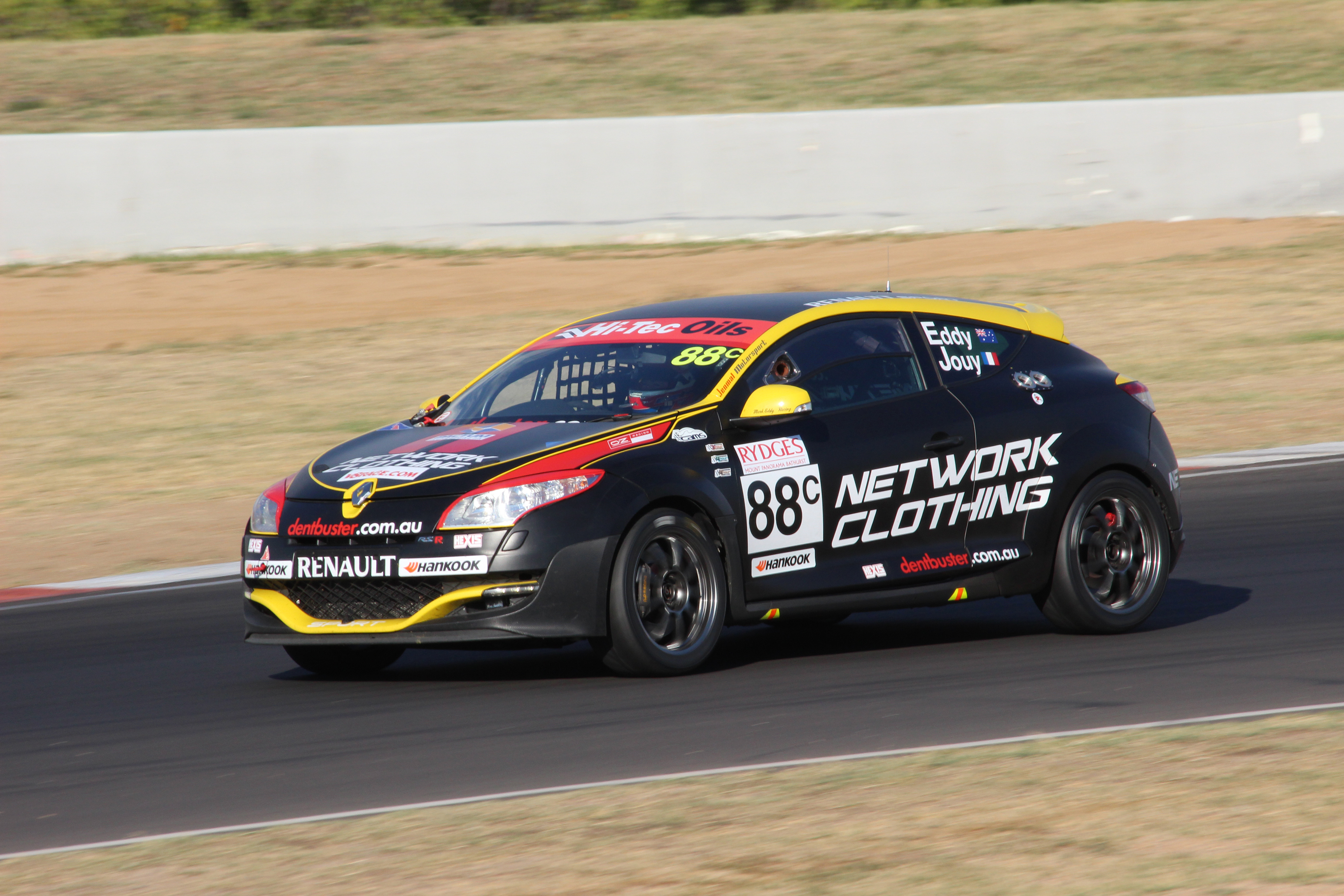
The Class C-winning Renault Mégane RS 265 of Mark Eddy and Francois Jouy.

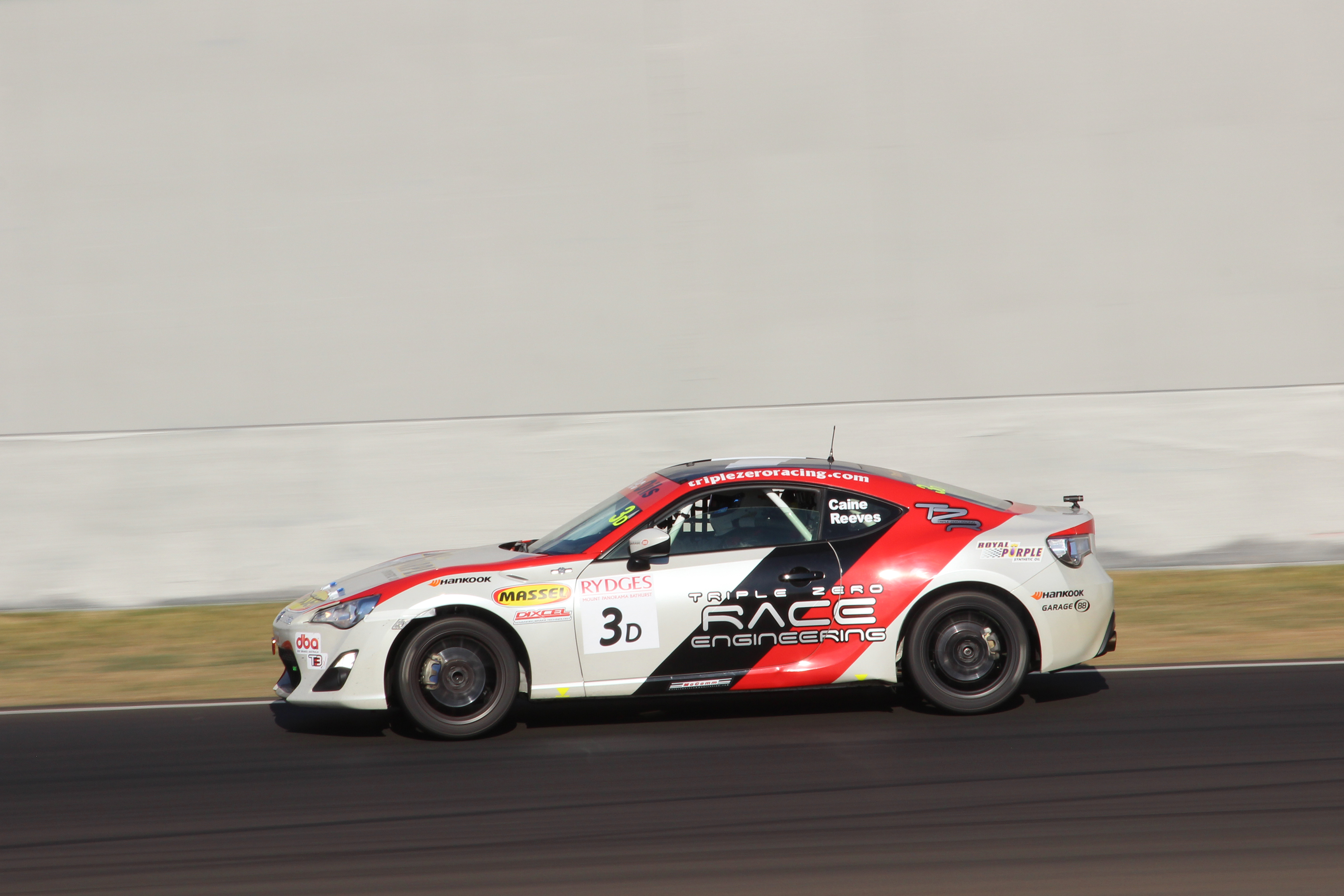
The Class D-winning Toyota 86 GTS of Chris Reeves and Mark Caine.

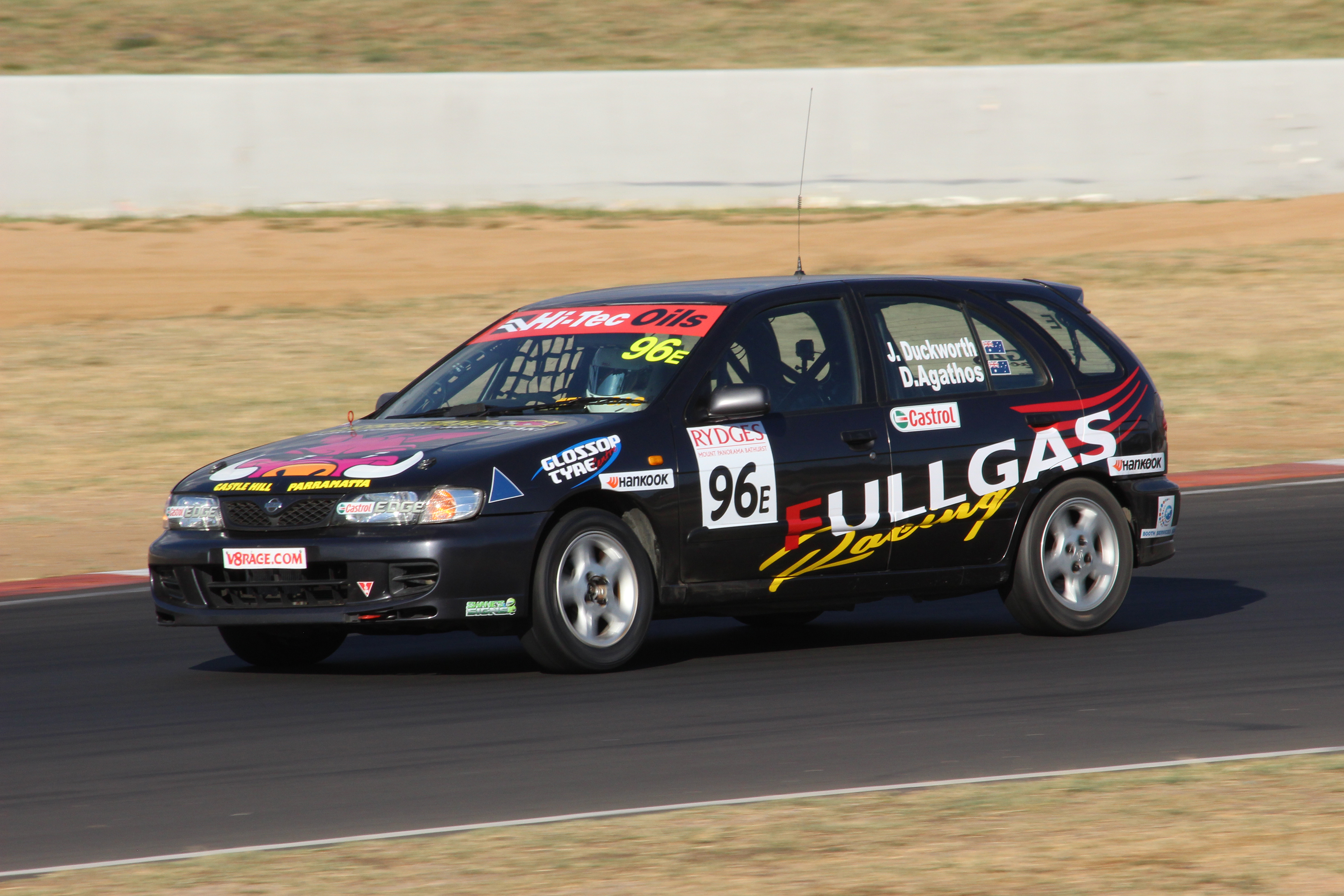
The Class E-winning Nissan Pulsar N15 of Dimitri Agathos and James Duckworth.

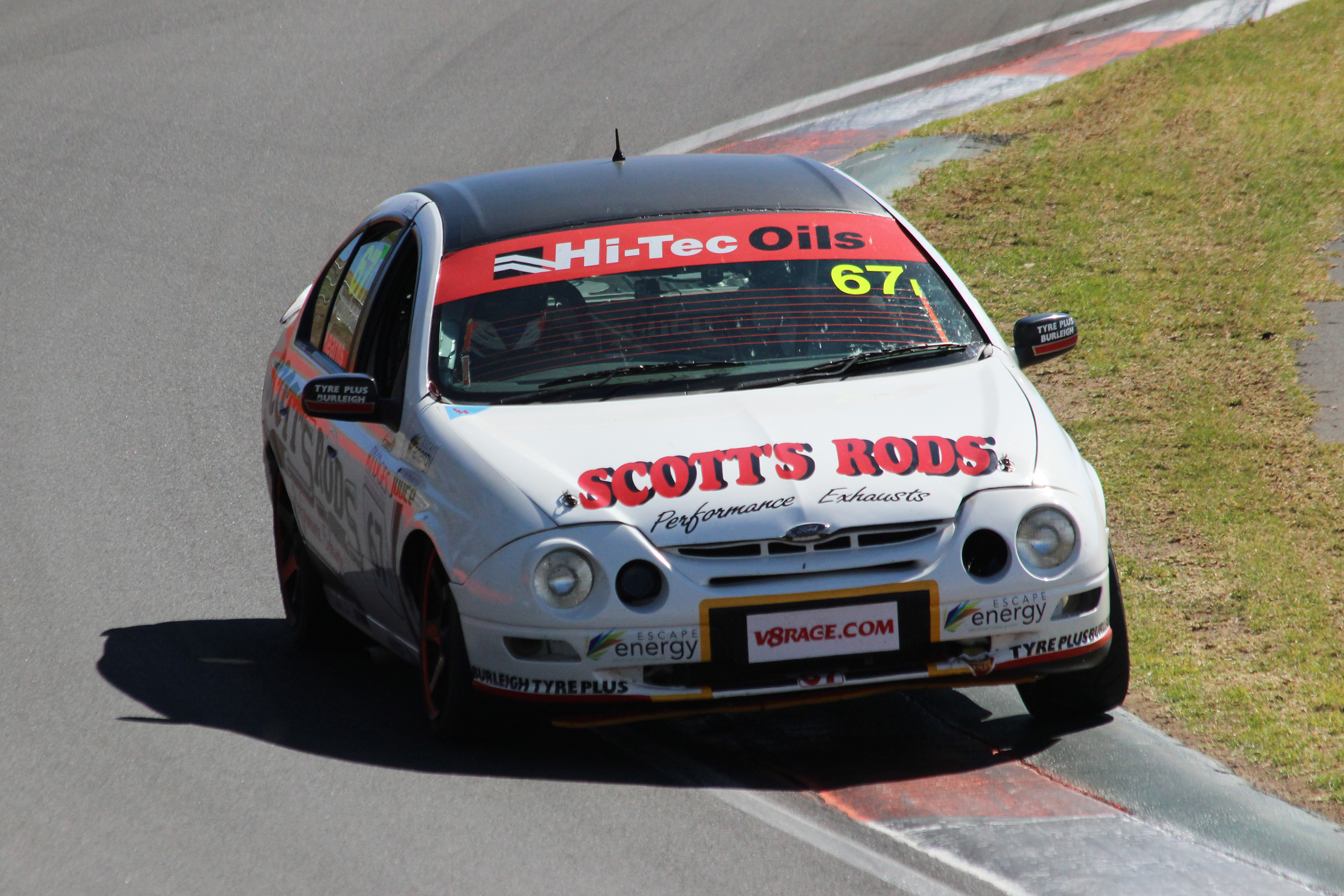
The Class I-winning Ford AU Falcon of Lindsay Kearns and Coleby Cowham.

Pos.	Class	No.	Drivers	Entrant	Car	Laps
1	**B1**	**11**	**(Australia) Nathan Morcom (Australia) Chaz Mostert**	**Direct Plasterboard Outlet**	**BMW 335i E92**	**125**
2	B1	19	(Australia) Michael Sherrin (Australia) Iain Sherrin (Australia) David Ayres	Sherrin Racing Pty Ltd	BMW 135i E82	125
3	**A1**	**20**	**(Australia) David Wall (Australia) John Bowe**	**Alan East**	**Mitsubishi Lancer Evolution IX RS**	**124**
4	A1	8	(Australia) Michael Caine (Australia) Gerry Murphy	Jim Pollicina	Mitsubishi Lancer Evolution X RS	124
5	A1	7	(Australia) Jim Pollicina (Australia) John O'Dowd	Jim Pollicina	Mitsubishi Lancer Evolution X RS	123
6	**A2**	**69**	**(Australia) Tony Virag (Australia) Jeremy Gray (Australia) Warren Millett**	**Tony Virag**	**HSV E Series GTS**	**120**
7	A1	81	(Australia) Beric Lynton (Australia) Tim Leahey	Beric Lynton	BMW 1 Series M Coupé	119
8	**C**	**88**	**(Australia) Mark Eddy (France) Francois Jouy**	**Mark Eddy Racing Pty Ltd**	**Renault Mégane RS 265**	**118**
9	A1	22	(Australia) Robert Marshall (Australia) Steve McLaughlan	Melbourne Performance Centre	Mitsubishi Lancer Evolution X RS	118
10	**D**	**3**	**(Australia) Chris Reeves (Australia) Mark Caine**	**Triple Zero Racing**	**Toyota 86 GTS**	**118**
11	C	43	(Australia) Nick Cox (Australia) Adam Gosling	Nicholas Cox	BMW 130i E87	117
12	D	4	(Australia) Daniel Sugden (Australia) Jake Williams (Australia) Jason Humble	Nicholas Cox	BMW 328i E36	117
13	**B2**	**14**	**(Australia) Brian Walden (Australia) Michael Auld (Australia) Richard Bloomfield**	**Garth Walden Racing**	**Holden VE Commodore SS**	**116**
14	C	40	(Australia) Blake Aubin (Australia) Kyle Aubin	Aubin Brothers Racing	Renault Mégane RS 265	116
15	**I**	**67**	**(Australia) Lindsay Kearns (Australia) Coleby Cowham**	**CK Competition**	**Ford AU Falcon**	**116**
16	A2	47	(Australia) Brett Heeley (Australia) Matthew Holt (Australia) Jaimie McKinlay	Heeley Motorsports	HSV VX GTS	116
17	D	39	(Australia) David Bailey (Australia) Matthew Shylan	David Bailey	Toyota 86 GTS	116
18	D	53	(Australia) Graeme Heath (Australia) Phil Alexander (Australia) Josh Heath	Healey Racing	Toyota 86 GTS	116
19	C	35	(Australia) Ric Shaw (Australia) Stephen Borness (Australia) Andrew Bollom	Michael Sloss	Mazda RX-8 GT	116
20	A1	55	(Australia) Tony Alford (Australia) Mark Griffith	Anthony Alford	BMW 1 Series M Coupé	115
21	D	9	(Australia) David Crowe (Australia) Trent Grubel (Australia) Alex Veryinis	David Crowe	Toyota 86 GTS	115
22	**E**	**96**	**(Australia) Dimitrios Agathos (Australia) James Duckworth**	**Dimitrios Agathos**	**Nissan Pulsar N15**	**114**
23	D	86	(Australia) Grant Phillips (Australia) Andrew Turpie	Pedders Racing	Toyota 86 GTS	114
24	B1	27	(Australia) Brett McFarland (Australia) Peter Green	Brett McFarland	Subaru Impreza WRX STI	112
25	C	13	(Australia) Colin Osborne (Australia) Hadrian Morrall	Osborne Motorsport	Renault Mégane RS 265	112
26	D	6	(Australia) Michael Wedge (Australia) Steve Hay (Australia) Stephen Coe	Triple Zero Racing	Toyota 86 GTS	112
27	D	97	(Australia) Carly Black (Australia) Barry Black (Australia) Leon Black	Gosford European Car Services	Renault Clio 197	112
28	I	23	(Australia) John McCleverty (Australia) Michael Zacka (Australia) Bradley Zacka	John McCleverty	Ford AU Falcon	111
29	E	72	(Australia) Daniel Holihan (Australia) Simon Hodges (Australia) Andrew Crawshaw	Allan Jarvis	Suzuki Swift Sport RS416	106
30	A2	18	(Australia) Graeme Muir (Australia) Jamie Hodgson (Australia) Geoffrey Kite	GTAC Racing	HSV E Series GTS	103
31	B1	54	(Australia) Adrian Stefan (Australia) Ashly Barnett	Adrian Stefan/BM West	BMW 335i E92	101
32	A2	51	(Australia) Daniel Flanagan (Australia) Merrick Malouf	DFR Fifth Gear Motoring	HSV VY GTS	100
33	A1	83	(Australia) Wade Scott (Australia) Duncan Handley	CXC Global Racing	Mitsubishi Lancer Evolution IX RS	99
DNF	A1	98	(Australia) Adam Proctor (Australia) Mark McHenry	Adam Proctor	Subaru Impreza WRX STI	110
DNF	C	31	(Australia) Scott Gore (Australia) Adrian Mastronardo	Osborne Motorsport	Renault Mégane RS 265	101
DNF	B1	24	(Australia) Ben Kavich (Australia) Michael Kavich (Australia) Kieren Pilkington	Workhorse Collision/Fleetsmart	Subaru Impreza WRX STI	87
DNF	B2	89	(Australia) Scott Sullivan (Australia) Edward Singleton	Scott Sullivan	Holden VY Commodore SS	80
DNF	B2	76	(Australia) Troy Williams (Australia) Matthew Windsor (Australia) Joshua Muggleton	TW Motorsport	Holden VE Commodore SS V	76
DNF	D	29	(Australia) Geoff Moran (Australia) Gerry Burges (Australia) Leigh Burges	Geoffrey Moran	Toyota 86 GTS	75
DNF	E	85	(Australia) Declan Kirkham (Australia) Philip Kirkham	Declan Kirkham	Mazda MX-6	65
DNF	A1	68	(Australia) Dylan Thomas (Australia) Terry Nightingale	CXC Global Racing	Mitsubishi Lancer Evolution X RS	49
DNF	A1	45	(Australia) Garth Walden (Australia) Ben Porter	Ronald Searle	Mercedes-Benz A 45 AMG	48
DNF	D	50	(Australia) James Keene (Australia) Dominic Martens (Australia) Jack Atley	MWM Racing	Mini Cooper S JCW	47
DNF	A1	21	(Australia) Rod Salmon (Australia) Andrew Richmond	Melbourne Performance Centre	Mitsubishi Lancer Evolution X RS	44
DNF	A2	65	(Australia) Trevor Symonds (Australia) Paul Lane (Australia) Scott Bargwanna	Symonds Motorsport	HSV VY GTS	43
DNF	A2	2	(Australia) Stephen Hodges (Australia) Robert Coulthard	Stephen Hodges	CSV Mondo GT	34
DNF	C	26	(Australia) Peter O'Donnell (Australia) Simon O'Donnell (Australia) James O'Donnell	Peter O'Donnell	BMW 130i E87	32
DNF	I	32	(Australia) Ashley Jarvis (Australia) Dion Jarvis (Australia) Brody Jarvis	Jarvis Racing	Ford AU Falcon	29
DNF	A1	16	(Australia) Daniel Oosthuizen (Australia) Jacques Oosthuizen	Oosthuizen Motorsports	Mitsubishi Lancer Evolution VIII RS	7
DNF	A1	62	(Australia) Luke Searle (Australia) Barry Graham (Australia) Paul Morris	David Searle	BMW M135i	0

- Class winners are shown in bold text.
- Race time of winning car: 6:04:04.617
- Fastest race lap: 2:28.533, Garth Walden
