= Nathan Morcom =

Australian racing driver (born 1992)

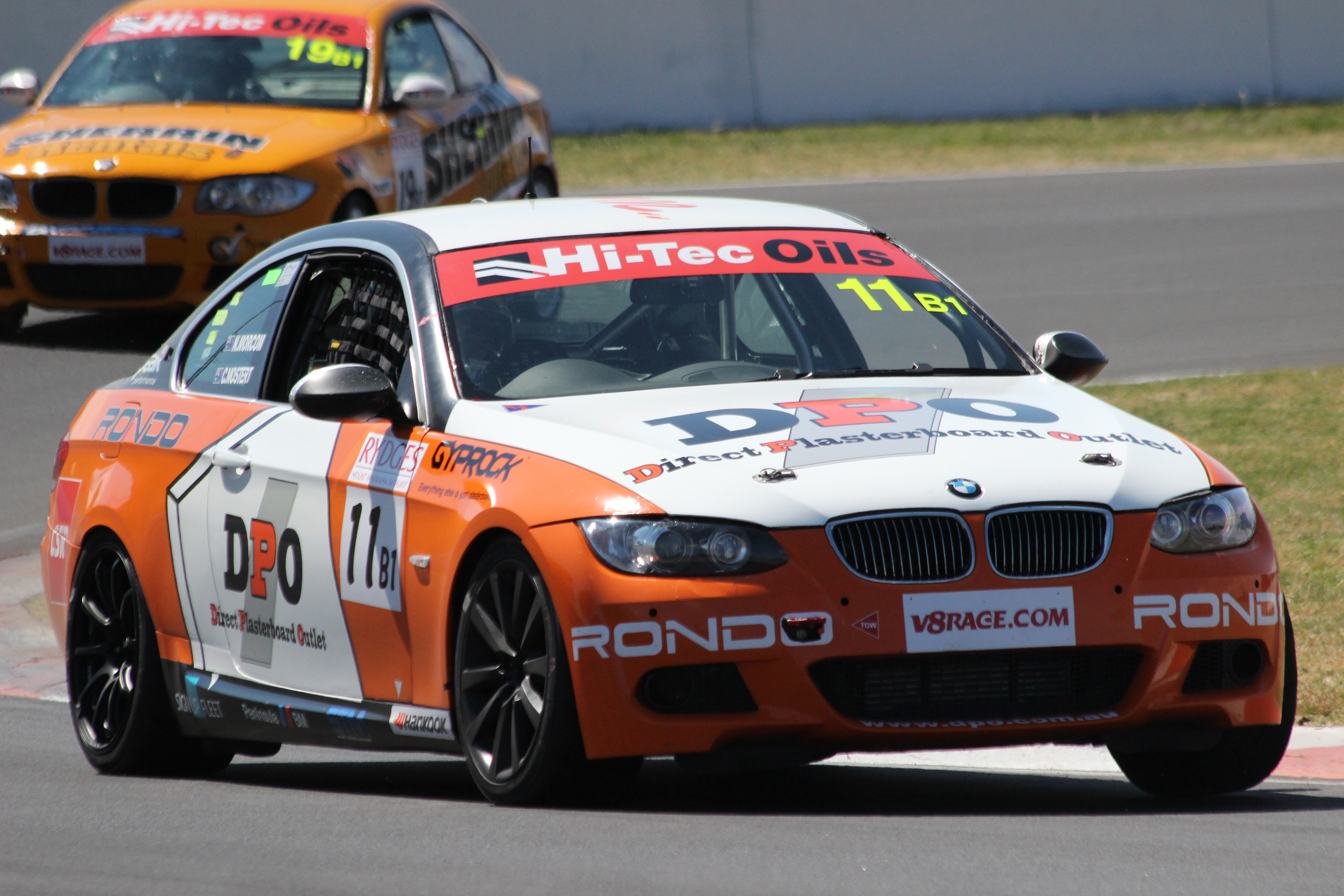
- Nationality: Australian
- Born: 5 April 1992 (age 34) Sydney
- Relatives: Barry Morcom (father)

TCR Australia Touring Car Series career
- Debut season: 2019
- Current team: HMO Customer Racing
- Car number: 11
- Starts: 57
- Wins: 3
- Podiums: 8
- Poles: 2
- Best finish: 4th in 2019

Previous series
- 2017-18 2016 2015–16 2014 2012–13 2011–12 2010 2008–10: Super2 Series; Australian Endurance Championship; Australian GT Championship; ADAC GT Championship; Australian Drivers' Championship; USA F2000 Series; Toyota Racing Series; Australian Formula Ford

Championship titles
- 2016: Australian Endurance Championship

Nathan Morcom (born 5 April 1992) is an Australian racing driver currently competing in the GT4 Australia Series. Morcom won the 2016 Australian Endurance Championship, 2011 Eastern Creek Six Hour and the 2016 Hi-Tec Oils Bathurst 6 Hour.

== Career Summery ==
=== Junior formula ===
Morcom started in Formula Ford in the 2008 season with mixed success. He raced in 2010 Toyota Racing Series before moving into the United States F2000 Championship Series in 2011 and 2012.

=== Australian Formula 3 ===
Morcom competed in the Australian Drivers' Championship for Australian Formula 3 cars in 2010, 2012 and 2013 with the latter bringing him his best championship result of sixth place.

=== Production Cars ===
Morcom moved in to the Australian Production Car Championship initially for the endurance races finishing fifth at the 2011 Phillip Island Six Hour and winning the 2011 Eastern Creek Six Hour with Chaz Mostert. He again teamed with Chaz Mostert to finish third at the 2012 Phillip Island 6 Hour, winning the 2016 Hi-Tec Oils Bathurst 6 Hour and runner up in the 2017 Hi-Tec Oils Bathurst 6 Hour.

In 2013, Morcom finished third in the championship driving a Mitsubishi Lancer Evo X and again in 2017 Australian Production Car Series driving a Ford LZ Focus RS.

=== GT racing ===
Morcom travelled to Europe to compete in the 2014 ADAC GT Masters Endurance championship for Farnbacher Racing in a Porsche 911 GT3 R. He did all sixteen races finishing thirty seventh in the series.

Moving back to Australia, Morcom competed in the 2015 Australian GT Championship and 2016 Australian GT Championship finishing third in 2016. The same year he and Grant Denyer won the 2016 Australian Endurance Championship.

In 2016, Morcom competed in the GT Asia Series for Matt Stone Racing.

In 2024, Morcom moved back to GT racing in the 2024 GT4 Australia Series. He finished fifth in the Silver Class championship.

=== Supercars ===
Morcom drove the No. 54 Holden VF Commodore for Eggleston Motorsport in the Dunlop Super2 Series in 2017 and 2018 with limited success.

=== TCR Australia ===
In 2019, Morcom competed in the newly formed TCR Australia Touring Car Series. He signed for HMO Customer Racing and competed in the 2019, 2021 and 2022 years. He was set to drive in the 2020 season, but this was cancelled due to COVID-19 pandemic.

== Career results ==
=== Karting career summary ===
Season	Series	Position
2006	Australian National Sprint Kart Championships - Junior National Light	6th
2007	Australian National Sprint Kart Championships - Junior National Light	10th
2007	Australian National Sprint Kart Championships - Junior Clubman	11th
2008	Australian National Sprint Kart Championships - Junior National Heavy	**3rd**
2008	Australian National Sprint Kart Championships - Junior Clubman	10th

=== Circuit racing career summary ===
Season	Series	Position	Car	Team
2008	New South Wales Formula Ford Championship	5th	Comtec Spirit K08	Anglo Australian Motorsport
2008	Australian Formula Ford Championship	19th	Spectrum	CAMS Rising Star
2009	Australian Formula Ford Championship	13th	Spectrum	CAMS Rising Star
2009	Victorian Formula Ford Championship	5th	Spectrum	CAMS Rising Star
2010	Australian Formula Ford Championship	10th	Spectrum	Synergy Motorsport
2010	Toyota Racing Series	12th	Tatuus - Toyota	ETEC Motorsport
2010	Australian Drivers' Championship	16th	Dallara F304	R-Tek Motorsport
2010	Australian Formula 3 - National Class	10th	Dallara F304	R-Tek Motorsport
2011	Australian Manufacturers' Championship	7th	BMW 335i	Eastern Creek Karts
2011	Australian Manufacturers' Championship - Class B	**2nd**	BMW 335i	Eastern Creek Karts
2011	Australian Production Car Endurance Championship	**2nd**	BMW 335i	Eastern Creek Karts
2011	United States F2000 Championship Series	8th	Van Diemen RF06	Primus Racing
2012	Australian Drivers' Championship	14th	Dallara F307	Astuti Motorsport
2012	Australian Manufacturers' Championship - Class B	6th	BMW 335i	Eastern Creek Karts
2012	United States F2000 Championship Series	45th	RFR F2000	Primus Racing
2013	Australian Manufacturers' Championship	**3rd**	Mitsubishi Lancer RS Evolution X	Eastern Creek Karts
2013	Australian Manufacturers' Championship - Class B	**3rd**	Mitsubishi Lancer RS Evolution X	Eastern Creek Karts
2013	Australian Drivers' Championship	6th	Dallara F307	R-Tek Motorsport
2014	ADAC GT Masters	37th	Porsche 911 GT3-R	Farnbacher Racing
2015	Australian GT Championship	42nd	Lamborghini Gallardo	Interlloy M Motorsport
2016	Australian GT Championship	**3rd**	McLaren 650S GT3	Tekno Autosports
2016	Australian Endurance Championship	**1st**	McLaren 650S GT3	Tekno Autosports
2016	GT Asia Series	25th	Aston Martin Vantage GT3	Matt Stone Racing
2017	Australian Production Car Series	**3rd**	Ford LZ Focus RS	Team DPO
2017	Dunlop Super2 Series	13th	Holden VF Commodore	Eggleston Motorsport
2018	Dunlop Super2 Series	19th	Holden VF Commodore	Eggleston Motorsport
2019	TCR Australia Touring Car Series	4th	Hyundai i30 N TCR	HMO Customer Racing
2021	TCR Australia Touring Car Series	6th	Hyundai i30 N TCR	HMO Customer Racing
2022	TCR Australia Touring Car Series	7th	Hyundai i30 N TCR	HMO Customer Racing
2024	GT4 Australia Series - Silver Class	5th	McLaren Artura GT4	Method Motorsport
2025	GT4 Australia Series - Silver Class	8th	McLaren Artura GT4	Method Motorsport

=== Complete Toyota Racing Series results ===
(key) (Races in bold indicate pole position) (Races in italics indicate fastest lap)

Year	Entrant	1	2	3	4	5	6	7	8	9	10	11	12	13	14	15	D.C.	Points
2010	ETEC Motorsport	TER; 1; 9	TER; 2; 10	TER; 3; 9	TIM; 1; 8	TIM; 2; 7	TIM; 3; 10	HMP; 1	HMP; 2	HMP; 3	MAN; 1	MAN; 2	MAN; 3	TAU; 1	TAU; 2	TAU; 3	12th	219

=== USF2000 National Championship results ===
Year	Entrant	Car	1	2	3	4	5	6	7	8	9	10	11	12	13	14	Pos	Points
2011	Primus Racing	Van Diemen RF06	VIR1; 1	VIR2; 8	ATL1; 5	ATL2; 23	WGI1; DNS	WGI2; 7	MOH1; 8	MOH2; 6	MOS1	MOS2	LRP1; 7	LRP2; 7	WGI3; 25	WGI4; 29	8th	246
2012	Primus Racing	RFR F2000	VIR1; 15	VIR2; 32	ATL1; 15	ATL2; DNS	LRP1	LRP2	NJ1	NJ2	MOH1	MOH2	SP1	SP2	WGI3	WGI4	45th	31

=== Complete Development Series results ===
(key) (Races in bold indicate pole position) (Races in italics indicate fastest lap)

Year	Team	Car	1	2	3	4	5	6	7	8	9	10	11	12	13	14	15	16	17	18	19	20	21	Position	Points
2017	Eggleston Motorsport	Holden Commodore VF	ADE; 16	ADE; 11	ADE; 13	SYM; 13	SYM; 9	SYM; 11	SYM; 7	PHI; 11	PHI; 12	PHI; 14	PHI; 16	TOW; 16	TOW; Ret	SMP; 17	SMP; 22	SMP; 15	SMP; 18	SAN; 20	SAN; 9	NEW; 9	NEW; 8	13th	876
2018	Eggleston Motorsport	Holden Commodore VF	ADE; 15	ADE; 20	ADE; 16	SYM; 8	SYM; 16	SYM; Ret	BAR; 19	BAR; 14	BAR; 17	TOW; 17	TOW; 18	SAN; Ret	SAN; Ret	BAT; 7	NEW; 10	NEW; C						19th	691

=== TCR Australia results ===
TCR Australia results
Year	Team	Car	1	2	3	4	5	6	7	8	9	10	11	12	13	14	15	16	17	18	19	20	21	Position	Points
2019	HMO Customer Racing	Hyundai i30 N TCR	SMP; R1; 9	SMP; R2; 8	SMP; R3; 11	PHI; R4; Ret	PHI; R5; 4	PHI; R6; 2	BEN; R7; 4	BEN; R8; 7	BEN; R9; 8	QLD; R10; 7	QLD; R11; 6	QLD; R12; 4	WIN; R13; 4	WIN; R14; 4	WIN; R15; 4	SAN; R16; 10	SAN; R17; 14	SAN; R18; 10	BEN; R19; Ret	BEN; R20; 6	BEN; R21; 1	4th	510
2021	HMO Customer Racing	Hyundai i30 N TCR	SYM; R1; 9	SYM; R2; 5	SYM; R3; 5	PHI; R4; 19	PHI; R5; 10	PHI; R6; 3	BAT; R7; 18	BAT; R8; 14	BAT; R9; 9	SMP; R10; 5	SMP; R11; 4	SMP; R12; 3	BAT; R13; 11	BAT; R14; 9	BAT; R15; Ret							6th	377
2022	HMO Customer Racing	Hyundai i30 N TCR	**SYM**; **R1**; **3**	SYM; R2; 13	SYM; R3; 6	PHI; R4; 19	PHI; R5; 9	PHI; R6; 11	BAT; R7; 12	BAT; R8; 20	BAT; R9; 15	SMP; R10; 6	SMP; R11; 3	**SMP**; **R12**; **1**	QLD; R13; Ret	QLD; R14; 10	QLD; R15; 10	SAN; R16; 12	SAN; R17; 11	SAN; R18; 11	BAT; R19; 3	BAT; R20; C	BAT; R21; 6	10th	471

=== Complete Bathurst 12 Hour results ===
Year	Team	Co-drivers	Car	Class	Laps	Overall position	Class position
2015	(Australia) Erebus Motorsport	(United States) Austin Cindric (Australia) Simon Hodge	Mercedes-Benz SLS AMG	AA	251	21st	7th

=== Complete Bathurst 6 Hour results ===
Year	Team	Co-drivers	Car	Class	Laps	Pos.	Class pos.
2016	(Australia) Direct Plasterboard Outlet	(Australia) Chaz Mostert	BMW 335i E92	B1	125	1st	1st
2017	(Australia) Direct Plasterboard Outlet	(Australia) Chaz Mostert	Ford Focus RS	A1	113	2nd	2nd
2018	(Australia) Direct Plasterboard Outlet	(Australia) Chaz Mostert	Ford Focus RS	A1	106	16th	11th

Sporting positions
Preceded by Grant Sherrin	Australian Endurance Championship; Champion; 2016	Succeeded by Peter Hackett; Dominic Storey
