= Corsa Specialised Vehicles =

Australian automaker

- Industry: Automotive
- Founded: 1994
- Founder: Peter Dichiera
- Headquarters: Mildura, Australia
- Products: Automobiles
- Website: www.csvaustralia.com

Corsa Specialised Vehicles (CSV) is a small-scale automaker established in 1994 that is based in Mildura, Victoria, Australia. Its range consists of V8-engined high performance cars based on those produced by Holden.

Since its founder, Peter Dichiera (an engine builder and 1970s drag racer), decided that CSV would not simply build modified versions of existing Holden cars, in 1996 it obtained government approval under the Australian Design Rules (ADR) scheme. In so doing, CSV became a "secondary manufacturer" in the same mold as its established large-scale rival, Holden Special Vehicles (HSV).

CSV's famed tuner reputation was established with the first vehicle built in 1994. Badged Corsa 220i ("corsa" meaning "race" in Italian), it was based on a Holden Berlina (VR). The interest arising from the favourable results of this new high performance sedan against an HSV equivalent, as published in a national automotive magazine, caused CSV to build a further two vehicles by special order and begin exhibiting at Australian motorshows.

The CSV range grew to include:

- the Volanti (a phonetic adaptation of "volante" meaning "flying" in Italian), Strada (meaning "road" in Italian) and Veloce (meaning "fast" in Italian), based on the short wheelbase Holden Commodore (VR to VX series) sedan and wagon
- the La Classe (meaning "the class" in Italian), based on the long wheelbase Holden Statesman/Caprice (VS and WH series) sedan
- the Mondo (meaning "world" in Italian), based on the Holden Monaro (V2 series) coupé. A total of only 15 were built.
- the Bullet based on the Holden (VS to VU series) utility.

External images
- Corsa Special Vehicles (CSV) models
- 1999 CSV Strada (VT)
- 2000 CSV Veloce (VT)
- 1999 CSV Bullet (VS)
- 2000 CSV Volanti (VX)
- 2002 CSV Mondo GT 427 (V2)

The individual model designation of each vehicle is based on the engine kilowatt-output. For example, the Mondo was offered as the GT305 (featuring a 5.7-litre LS1 producing 305 kW (409 hp), stainless steel high output headers, stainless steel exhaust, Harrop brakes, Koni suspension, 19-inch alloy wheels and 245/35ZR19 tyres), a "Stage 2" GT350R (featuring a blueprinted version of the base engine) and the GT400R (instead powered by a 6.5-litre V8 engine).

Apart from high capacity and high output V8 engines, enhanced suspension and braking systems, CSV models have been characterised by upgraded interiors and full body kits (in particular, bonnet air vents, revised grilles and large decklid spoilers).

CSV's achievements in the local Australian industry have included producing the fastest accelerating Australian production car from 0 to 400 metres (0.00 to 0.25 mi) (the CSV Veloce) in 2000, and offering the first Holden Commodore-based performance car powered by a 7.0-litre LS7 V8 engine (the 2007 CSV GTS), beating rival HSV with its subsequent W427.

Still based in Mildura, CSV's operations expanded to Melbourne for a time before their closure. The brand also has a presence in Perth, Western Australia, as CSV Australia.
