= Bathurst Motor Festival =

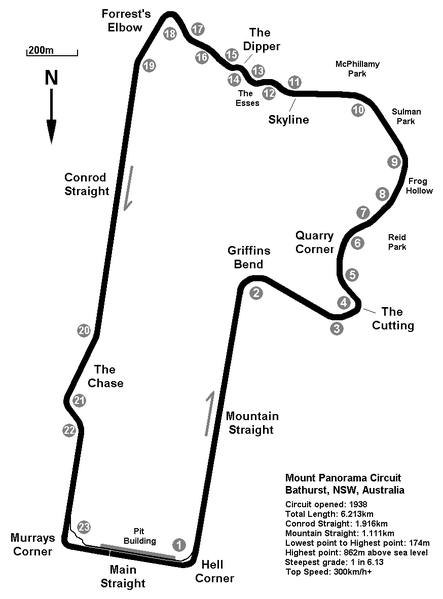
The Bathurst Motor Festival is held at the Mount Panorama Circuit.

The Bathurst Motor Festival was an annual motor racing event held at the Mount Panorama Circuit in Bathurst, New South Wales, Australia during the Easter long weekend. The event was first held in 2011 as a replacement for the Festival of Sporting Cars and as a way to give a higher number of drivers the opportunity to drive on the circuit. The event played host to a variety of racing categories, including production cars, sports cars, open-wheel racing cars and historic cars, which took part in sprint races, endurance races and regularity sessions. Around 300 vehicles were entered for the event each year, with crowds of up to and over 10,000 people attending the event. Car clubs also attended the event, displaying their cars within the confines of the circuit and performing parade laps.

In 2016, the Bathurst 6 Hour production car race was added. The Festival was not held after 2016 although the Bathurst 6 Hour race continued to be held.

== History ==
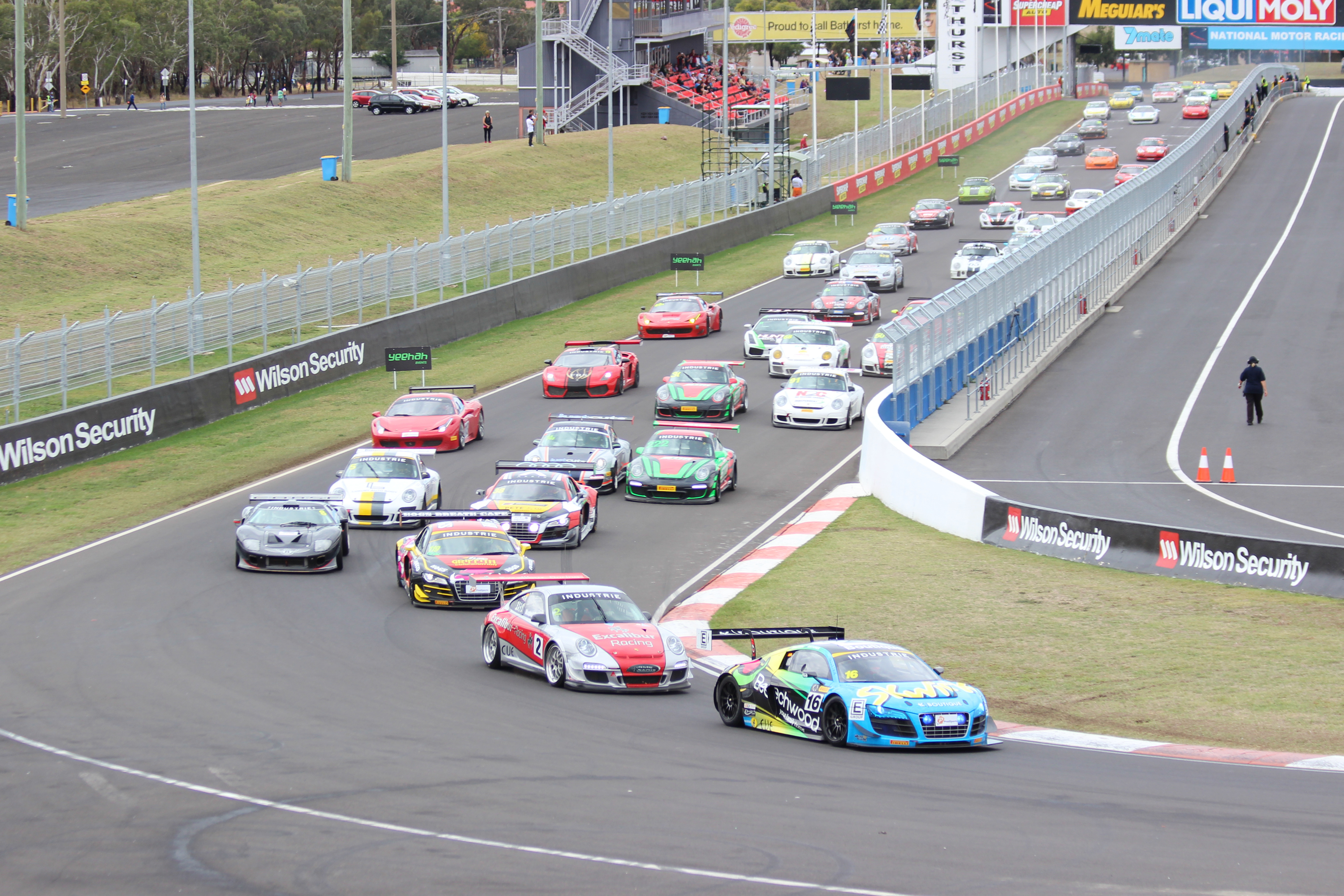
The start of a one-hour Production Sports race at the 2015 Bathurst Motor Festival.

During the 2014 event, Formula 3 driver Simon Hodge set a new lap record for the circuit of 2:02.6701. Hodge's time remained as the lap record until the 2016 Liqui Moly Bathurst 12 Hour, where Shane van Gisbergen set a time of 2:01.567 in a McLaren 650S GT3.

During the 2016 event, Nathan Morcom and 2014 Bathurst 1000 winner Chaz Mostert won the inaugural Bathurst 6 Hour, which also saw the event's biggest weekend crowd to date.

== Racing categories ==
The following categories have raced at the Bathurst Motor Festival.

- Aussie Racing Cars
- Australian Drivers' Championship
- Australian Formula Ford Series
- Australian Pulsar Racing Association
- Australian Saloon Car Series
- Commodore Cup
- Formula Vee
- Group N Touring Cars
- GT World Challenge Australia
- Heritage Touring Cars
- Historic Formula Ford
- HQ Holden
- Hyundai Excel Racing
- Improved Production
- Production Sports
- Production Touring
- Radical Australia
- SuperMini Challenge
- TCR Australia
- Trans Am Australia
