= 2010 Supercheap Auto Bathurst 1000 =

Motor race in Australia

Seasons
- ← 2009 2011 →

(New South Wales) 2010 Supercheap Auto Bathurst 1000
Event Information
- Round 10 of 14 in the 2010 V8 Supercar Championship Series
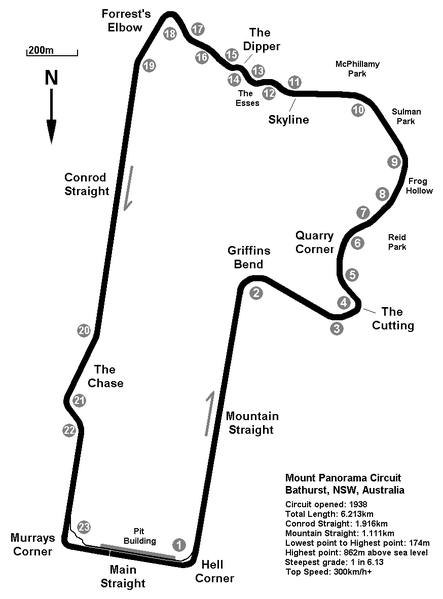
- Date: 7–10 October 2010
- Location: Bathurst, New South Wales
- Venue: Mount Panorama Circuit
- Weather: Overcast/intermittent showers clearing to fine

Results
Race 1
Distance	161 laps	1000 km
Pole position	Mark Winterbottom; Ford Performance Racing	2:07.5377
Winner	Craig Lowndes; Mark Skaife; Triple Eight Race Engineering	6:12:51.4153

The 2010 Supercheap Auto Bathurst 1000 was a motor race for V8 Supercars. The race, which was held on Sunday, 10 October 2010 at the Mount Panorama Circuit just outside Bathurst, New South Wales, Australia was Race 18 of the 2010 V8 Supercar Championship Series. It was the fourteenth running of the Australian 1000 race, first held after the organisational split over the Bathurst 1000 that occurred in 1997. It was also the 53rd race for which the lineage can be traced back to the 1960 Armstrong 500 held at Phillip Island.

== Entry list ==
31 cars were entered in the race – 20 Holden Commodores and 11 Ford Falcons. Along with the 29 regular season entries, there were two 'wildcards' from the Development Series that were contesting both endurance races – one from MW Motorsport and the other from Greg Murphy Racing. Three drivers made their 'Great Race' debuts – James Moffat, Ant Pedersen and Geoff Emery. Multiple drivers made their last Bathurst 1000 starts – Jason Richards, Glenn Seton, Tony Ricciardello, Damian Assaillit and Mark Noske.

No.	Drivers	Team (sponsor)	Car	No.	Drivers	Team (sponsor)	Car
1	(Australia) Jamie Whincup (Australia) Steve Owen	Triple Eight Race Engineering (Vodafone)	Holden Commodore VE	18	(Australia) James Courtney (Australia) Warren Luff	Dick Johnson Racing (Jim Beam)	Ford Falcon FG
2	(Australia) Garth Tander (Australia) Cameron McConville	Holden Racing Team (Holden, Toll)	Holden Commodore VE	19	(Australia) Jonathon Webb (Australia) David Russell	Tekno Autosports (Mother Energy)	Ford Falcon FG
3	(Australia) Tony D'Alberto (Australia) Shane Price	Tony D'Alberto Racing (Bellmont, Centaur)	Holden Commodore VE	21	(Australia) Karl Reindler (Australia) David Wall	Britek Motorsport (Fair Dinkum Sheds)	Holden Commodore VE
4	(Australia) Alex Davison (Australia) David Brabham	Stone Brothers Racing (Irwin Tools)	Ford Falcon FG	22	(Australia) Will Davison (Australia) David Reynolds	Holden Racing Team (Holden, Toll)	Holden Commodore VE
5	(Australia) Mark Winterbottom (Australia) Luke Youlden	Ford Performance Racing (Orrcon Steel)	Ford Falcon FG	24	(New Zealand) Fabian Coulthard (New Zealand) Craig Baird	Walkinshaw Racing (Bundaberg Rum: Red)	Holden Commodore VE
6	(New Zealand) Steven Richards (Australia) James Moffat	Ford Performance Racing (Dunlop Super Dealers)	Ford Falcon FG	27	(Australia) Damien Assaillit (New Zealand) Ant Pedersen	MW Motorsport (Fujitsu)	Ford Falcon BF
7	(Australia) Todd Kelly (Australia) Dale Wood	Kelly Racing (Jack Daniel's)	Holden Commodore VE	30	(Australia) Nathan Pretty (Australia) Mark Noske	Lucas Dumbrell Motorsport (Gulf Western Oil)	Holden Commodore VE
8	(New Zealand) Jason Richards (Australia) Andrew Jones	Brad Jones Racing (BOC Gas and Gear)	Holden Commodore VE	33	(Australia) Lee Holdsworth (Australia) David Besnard	Garry Rogers Motorsport (Fujitsu)	Holden Commodore VE
9	(New Zealand) Shane van Gisbergen (New Zealand) John McIntyre	Stone Brothers Racing (SP Tools)	Ford Falcon FG	34	(Australia) Michael Caruso (Australia) Greg Ritter	Garry Rogers Motorsport (Fujitsu)	Holden Commodore VE
10	(Australia) Andrew Thompson (Australia) Ryan Briscoe	Walkinshaw Racing (Bundaberg Rum: Red)	Holden Commodore VE	39	(Australia) Russell Ingall (Australia) Paul Morris	Paul Morris Motorsport (Supercheap Auto)	Holden Commodore VE
11	(Australia) Jason Bargwanna (Australia) Glenn Seton	Kelly Racing (Rock Energy)	Holden Commodore VE	44	(Australia) Geoff Emery (Australia) Rod Salmon	Greg Murphy Racing (Skwirk)	Holden Commodore VE
12	(Australia) Dean Fiore (Australia) Michael Patrizi	Triple F Racing (Bing Lee)	Ford Falcon FG	47	(Australia) Tim Slade (Australia) Jack Perkins	James Rosenberg Racing (Wilson Security)	Ford Falcon FG
14	(Australia) Jason Bright (New Zealand) Matthew Halliday	Brad Jones Racing (Trading Post)	Holden Commodore VE	51	(New Zealand) Greg Murphy (Denmark) Allan Simonsen	Paul Morris Motorsport (Castrol Edge)	Holden Commodore VE
15	(Australia) Rick Kelly (Australia) Owen Kelly	Kelly Racing (Jack Daniel's)	Holden Commodore VE	55	(Australia) Paul Dumbrell (Australia) Dean Canto	Rod Nash Racing (The Bottle-O)	Ford Falcon FG
16	(Australia) Tony Ricciardello (Australia) Taz Douglas	Kelly Racing (Stratco)	Holden Commodore VE	888	(Australia) Craig Lowndes (Australia) Mark Skaife	Triple Eight Race Engineering (Vodafone)	Holden Commodore VE
17	(Australia) Steven Johnson (Australia) Marcus Marshall	Dick Johnson Racing (Jim Beam)	Ford Falcon FG				

*Entries with a grey background were wildcard entries which did not compete in the full championship season.

=== Driver changes ===
Several changes in driver pairings occurred between the 2010 L&H 500 (Race 17 of the Championship) and the Bathurst event. Fujitsu V8 Supercar Series racer Nick Percat stepped down from his drive with Andrew Thompson (Walkinshaw Racing) in favour of Team Penske Indycar driver Ryan Briscoe who had been unavailable for the L&H 500 due to his Indycar commitments. Similarly Tim Blanchard stepped aside from his Paul Morris Motorsport drive to allow Allan Simonsen to take up the seat alongside Greg Murphy.

Greg Murphy Racing was also forced into a driver change with the team unable to agree terms with its Phillip Island driver, Marcus Zukanovic. The team nominated Rod Salmon to take the position, his first Bathurst 1000 since 2001.

== Practice ==
Honours was shared in Thursday practice between Triple Eight Race Engineering and Dick Johnson Racing. James Courtney topped the first session in the morning with Warren Luff fastest in the co-driver session held immediately afterwards. The final combined session saw Jamie Whincup record the fastest lap of the day with a 2:07.1309. Courtney was two tenths behind with Craig Lowndes a further two tenths away. Mark Winterbottom was fourth fastest with Jason Bright a surprise fifth fastest. 2009 Bathurst 1000 winner Garth Tander was sixth fastest ahead of Paul Dumbrell, Will Davison, Russell Ingall and Jason Bargwanna.

Rod Salmon crashed in the morning session and was eleven seconds off the pace. Salmon stepped down from the drive of the #44 Greg Murphy Racing car and the originally nominated driver, Marcus Zukanovic, returned to the seat.

Steve Owen topped the co-driver session on Friday morning ahead of Luke Youlden, Warren Luff, Mark Skaife and Andrew Jones, the latter giving a preview of the pace of the #8 BJR Commodore. However, half an hour later the car was eliminated from qualifying after co-driver Jason Richards clipped the inside wall at Forrest's Elbow resulting in a heavy impact with the outside barrier. Jamie Whincup then hit the stationary car approximately a minute later, however the damage to Whincup's car was light and was repaired in time for qualifying. Richards’ car had bent chassis rails, and the Brad Jones Racing team would concentrate their efforts on Jason Bright for qualifying. Craig Lowndes offset Whincup's problems by recording the fastest ever lap around the circuit, a 2:06.8012, eclipsing Greg Murphy's 2003 pole position by five hundredths of a second.

== Qualifying ==
Todd Kelly was an early victim of qualifying, the Kelly Racing Commodore brushing the wall at Griffin's Bend, damaging the rear suspension in such a manner that he would be unable to set a competitive qualifying lap. Craig Lowndes was fastest for much of qualifying, setting a time of 2:07.2184 early in the session. Whincup soon set second fastest time in his repaired Commodore and Mark Winterbottom was best of the rest for much of the session. With twelve minutes left in the session Jason Bright showed the pace Brad Jones Racing had by jumping past Winterbottom into third. Lee Holdsworth was next, followed by Greg Murphy with Steven Johnson moving into seventh as the final ten minutes began. Both Triple Eight drivers shaved tenths away as the session progressed but matching Lowndes’ time of 2:06.8 from the morning was looking less likely.

With five minutes to go Jason Bright set the time that earned Provisional Pole Position, a 2:07.0002. Seconds later James Courtney improved and Paul Dumbrell climbed into the top ten shortly afterwards. The final order saw Bright ahead of Lowndes, Whincup, Winterbottom, Holdsworth, Courtney, Will Davison and Garth Tander as the Holden Racing Team made up positions in the final minutes. Greg Murphy and Paul Dumbrell completed the shootout line-up with Steven Johnson missing out by nine hundredths of a second. Rick Kelly was best of the Kelly cars in twelfth just ahead of Shane van Gisbergen in the best of the Stone Brothers’ Fords and Steven Richards in the FPR Falcon.

At the back some drivers were struggling. Tony Ricciardello and Geoff Emery were respectively 1.3 and 2.4 seconds slower than the next best healthy car while Damian Assaillit would join the absent BJR Commodore of Jason Richards at the back when the MW Motorsport Falcon was disqualified from the session.

=== Shootout ===
Paul Dumbrell was first out, slightly untidy over the top of the Mountain to start the times with a lap just under 2:09. Greg Murphy was faster, then Garth Tander was faster again, the first driver to climb into the 2:07 bracket. Teammate Will Davison could not match Tander, and James Courtney was slower again.

Lee Holdsworth went fastest with a 2:07.7. Mark Winterbottom set the pole position time in the Ford with a 2:07.5377. Jamie Whincup was barely faster than Holdsworth. Craig Lowndes got the closest to Winterbottom, eight hundredths of a second shy. After being fastest on Friday, Jason Bright set a time which was only good enough for eighth grid position.

Despite practice pace which suggested a 2:06 was possible in the shootout, Winterbottom's pole lap was only the fifth fastest pole position in Bathurst history.

== Race ==
Winterbottom lead the way at the start, pulling clear of Mark Skaife, Holdsworth, Davison, Whincup, Murphy, Courtney, Dean Canto and Steven Johnson.

Further back in the pack Cameron McConville and Michael Caruso both made very slow starts. Jason Bargwanna swerved to miss Caruso and was clipped by Fabian Coulthard on the left rear corner. Into The Chase on the same lap, Coulthard's left rear wheel failed, tipping the car into the sandtrap and rolling six times.

Holdsworth took the lead in the early laps while Whincup had moved up to third position by lap 12. Davison passed Winterbottom for second. Light rain began to fall on lap 19 and continued to fall intermittently for much of the morning. Dean Fiore went off the track at McPhillamy, causing a safety car after hitting the wall earlier in the lap on lap 58.

Lap 68 saw Jason Richards pit with a sticking throttle after being one of just two cars to record a 2:08 lap. Luke Youlden had a tyre deflate on the climb up to the Cutting and hit the wall on lap 71. Youlden limped back to the pits, the tyre was replaced and Mark Winterbottom was sent back out although times were immediately slower.

Jason Bargwanna stopped on Conrod Straight on lap 135, bringing out a safety car and bringing an end to the V8 Supercar career of co-driver and former series champion Glenn Seton. On lap 154 Will Davison crashed out of third position at Sulman Park prompting the final safety car of the race.

At the final restart Lowndes led Whincup, Tander, Courtney, Bright, Holdsworth, Murphy, Ingall, Winterbottom and Caruso. Holdsworth lost a place to Murphy, and a lap later Bright passed Courtney for fourth.

Lowndes led Whincup across the line for the first 1-2 team finish in the race since 1984 and the third in total. Garth Tander claimed third position for the Holden Racing Team and Jason Bright finished fourth for Brad Jones Racing. James Courtney and Warren Luff were the best placed Ford in fifth. Greg Murphy finished sixth ahead of his teammate Russell Ingall in eighth. Between them was Lee Holdsworth, his seventh place a poor reward after leading the race for so long. Mark Winterbottom salvaged a ninth-place finish with Michael Caruso completing the top ten.

The total race elapsed time broke the long-standing 1991 record (6h 12m 51.4153s versus 6h 19m 14.80s). This was also the first time the race had been completed at an average speed above 160 km/h and 100 mph. The record stood for three years until beaten at the 2013 event.

== Results ==
=== Qualifying ===
Pos	No	Name	Car	Team	Time
1	14	(Australia) Jason Bright (New Zealand) Matt Halliday	Holden VE Commodore	Brad Jones Racing	2:07.0002
2	888	(Australia) Craig Lowndes (Australia) Mark Skaife	Holden VE Commodore	Triple Eight Race Engineering	2:07.0069
3	1	(Australia) Jamie Whincup (Australia) Steve Owen	Holden VE Commodore	Triple Eight Race Engineering	2:07.3663
4	5	(Australia) Mark Winterbottom (Australia) Luke Youlden	Ford FG Falcon	Ford Performance Racing	2:07.4526
5	33	(Australia) Lee Holdsworth (Australia) David Besnard	Holden VE Commodore	Garry Rogers Motorsport	2:07.4687
6	18	(Australia) James Courtney (Australia) Warren Luff	Ford FG Falcon	Dick Johnson Racing	2:07.7278
7	22	(Australia) Will Davison (Australia) David Reynolds	Holden VE Commodore	Holden Racing Team	2:07.7375
8	2	(Australia) Garth Tander (Australia) Cameron McConville	Holden VE Commodore	Holden Racing Team	2:07.7899
9	51	(New Zealand) Greg Murphy (Denmark) Allan Simonsen	Holden VE Commodore	Paul Morris Motorsport	2:07.8646
10	55	(Australia) Paul Dumbrell (Australia) Dean Canto	Ford FG Falcon	Rod Nash Racing	2:07.8717
11	17	(Australia) Steven Johnson (Australia) Marcus Marshall	Ford FG Falcon	Dick Johnson Racing	2:07.9635
12	15	(Australia) Rick Kelly (Australia) Owen Kelly	Holden VE Commodore	Kelly Racing	2:08.0556
13	9	(New Zealand) Shane van Gisbergen (New Zealand) John McIntyre	Ford FG Falcon	Stone Brothers Racing	2:08.0656
14	6	(New Zealand) Steven Richards (Australia) James Moffat	Ford FG Falcon	Ford Performance Racing	2:08.1161
15	34	(Australia) Michael Caruso (Australia) Greg Ritter	Holden VE Commodore	Garry Rogers Motorsport	2:08.2907
16	39	(Australia) Russell Ingall (Australia) Paul Morris	Holden VE Commodore	Paul Morris Motorsport	2:08.3541
17	19	(Australia) Jonathon Webb (Australia) David Russell	Ford FG Falcon	Tekno Autosports	2:08.3753
18	4	(Australia) Alex Davison (Australia) David Brabham	Ford FG Falcon	Stone Brothers Racing	2:08.4052
19	11	(Australia) Jason Bargwanna (Australia) Glenn Seton	Holden VE Commodore	Kelly Racing	2:08.4550
20	3	(Australia) Tony D'Alberto (Australia) Shane Price	Holden VE Commodore	Tony D'Alberto Racing	2:08.5508
21	24	(New Zealand) Fabian Coulthard (New Zealand) Craig Baird	Holden VE Commodore	Walkinshaw Racing	2:08.6359
22	21	(Australia) Karl Reindler (Australia) David Wall	Holden VE Commodore	Brad Jones Racing	2:08.8156
23	12	(Australia) Dean Fiore (Australia) Michael Patrizi	Ford FG Falcon	Triple F Racing	2:08.8886
24	10	(Australia) Andrew Thompson (Australia) Ryan Briscoe	Holden VE Commodore	Walkinshaw Racing	2:09.0272
25	47	(Australia) Tim Slade (Australia) Jack Perkins	Ford FG Falcon	James Rosenberg Racing	2:09.0784
26	30	(Australia) Nathan Pretty (Australia) Mark Noske	Holden VE Commodore	Lucas Dumbrell Motorsport	2:09.1773
27	7	(Australia) Todd Kelly (Australia) Dale Wood	Holden VE Commodore	Kelly Racing	2:09.3223
28	16	(Australia) Tony Ricciardello (Australia) Taz Douglas	Holden VE Commodore	Kelly Racing	2:10.4957
29	44	(Australia) Geoff Emery (Australia) Marcus Zukanovic	Holden VE Commodore	Greg Murphy Racing	2:11.5023
DSQ	27	(Australia) Damian Assaillit (New Zealand) Ant Pedersen	Ford BF Falcon	MW Motorsport	excluded
-	8	(New Zealand) Jason Richards (Australia) Andrew Jones	Holden VE Commodore	Brad Jones Racing	no time

=== Top ten shootout ===
Pos	No	Driver	Team	Time
1	5	(Australia) Mark Winterbottom	Ford Performance Racing	2:07.5377
2	888	(Australia) Craig Lowndes	Triple Eight Race Engineering	2:07.6201
3	1	(Australia) Jamie Whincup	Triple Eight Race Engineering	2:07.7226
4	33	(Australia) Lee Holdsworth	Garry Rogers Motorsport	2:07.7674
5	2	(Australia) Garth Tander	Holden Racing Team	2:07.8489
6	22	(Australia) Will Davison	Holden Racing Team	2:08.0379
7	18	(Australia) James Courtney	Dick Johnson Racing	2:08.1665
8	14	(Australia) Jason Bright	Brad Jones Racing	2:08.3979
9	51	(New Zealand) Greg Murphy	Paul Morris Motorsport	2:08.7361
10	55	(Australia) Paul Dumbrell	Rod Nash Racing	2:08.9597

=== Starting grid ===
The following table represents the final starting grid for the race on Sunday:

Inside row			Outside row		
1	(Australia) Mark Winterbottom (Australia) Luke Youlden	5	888	(Australia) Craig Lowndes (Australia) Mark Skaife	2
1	Ford Performance Racing (Ford Falcon FG)		Triple Eight Race Engineering (Holden Commodore VE)		2
3	(Australia) Jamie Whincup (Australia) Steve Owen	1	33	(Australia) Lee Holdsworth (Australia) David Besnard	4
3	Triple Eight Race Engineering (Holden Commodore VE)		Garry Rogers Motorsport (Holden Commodore VE)		4
5	(Australia) Garth Tander (Australia) Cameron McConville	2	22	(Australia) Will Davison (Australia) David Reynolds	6
5	Holden Racing Team (Holden Commodore VE)		Holden Racing Team (Holden Commodore VE)		6
7	(Australia) James Courtney (Australia) Warren Luff	18	14	(Australia) Jason Bright (New Zealand) Matthew Halliday	8
7	Dick Johnson Racing (Ford Falcon FG)		Brad Jones Racing (Holden Commodore VE)		8
9	(New Zealand) Greg Murphy (Denmark) Allan Simonsen	51	55	(Australia) Paul Dumbrell (Australia) Dean Canto	10
9	Paul Morris Motorsport (Holden Commodore VE)		Rod Nash Racing (Ford Falcon FG)		10
11	(Australia) Steven Johnson (Australia) Marcus Marshall	17	15	(Australia) Rick Kelly (Australia) Owen Kelly	12
11	Dick Johnson Racing (Ford Falcon FG)		Kelly Racing (Holden Commodore VE)		12
13	(New Zealand) Shane van Gisbergen (New Zealand) John McIntyre	9	6	(New Zealand) Steven Richards (Australia) James Moffat	14
13	Stone Brothers Racing (Ford Falcon FG)		Ford Performance Racing (Ford Falcon FG)		14
15	(Australia) Michael Caruso (Australia) Greg Ritter	34	39	(Australia) Russell Ingall (Australia) Paul Morris	16
15	Garry Rogers Motorsport (Holden Commodore VE)		Paul Morris Motorsport (Holden Commodore VE)		16
17	(Australia) Jonathon Webb (Australia) David Russell	19	4	(Australia) Alex Davison (Australia) David Brabham	18
17	Tekno Autosports (Ford Falcon FG)		Stone Brothers Racing (Ford Falcon FG)		18
19	(Australia) Jason Bargwanna (Australia) Glenn Seton	11	3	(Australia) Tony D'Alberto (Australia) Shane Price	20
19	Kelly Racing (Holden Commodore VE)		Tony D'Alberto Racing (Holden Commodore VE)		20
21	(New Zealand) Fabian Coulthard (New Zealand) Craig Baird	24	21	(Australia) Karl Reindler (Australia) David Wall	22
21	Walkinshaw Racing (Holden Commodore VE)		Britek Motorsport (Holden Commodore VE)		22
23	(Australia) Dean Fiore (Australia) Michael Patrizi	12	10	(Australia) Andrew Thompson (Australia) Ryan Briscoe	24
23	Triple F Racing (Ford Falcon FG)		Walkinshaw Racing (Holden Commodore VE)		24
25	(Australia) Tim Slade (Australia) Jack Perkins	47	30	(Australia) Nathan Pretty (Australia) Mark Noske	26
25	James Rosenberg Racing (Ford Falcon FG)		Lucas Dumbrell Motorsport (Holden Commodore VE)		26
27	(Australia) Todd Kelly (Australia) Dale Wood	7	16	(Australia) Tony Ricciardello (Australia) Taz Douglas	28
27	Kelly Racing (Holden Commodore VE)		Kelly Racing (Holden Commodore VE)		28
29	(Australia) Geoff Emery (Australia) Marcus Zukanovic	44	27	(New Zealand) Ant Pedersen (Australia) Damian Assaillit	30
29	Greg Murphy Racing (Holden Commodore VE)		MW Motorsport (Ford Falcon BF)		30
31	(New Zealand) Jason Richards (Australia) Andrew Jones	8			
31	Brad Jones Racing (Holden Commodore VE)				

=== Race results ===
Pos	No	Driver	Car	Team	Laps	Time/Retired	Grid	Points
1	888	(Australia) Craig Lowndes (Australia) Mark Skaife	Holden Commodore VE	Triple Eight Race Engineering	161	6hr 12min 51.4153sec	2	300
2	1	(Australia) Jamie Whincup (Australia) Steve Owen	Holden Commodore VE	Triple Eight Race Engineering	161	+0.2s	3	276
3	2	(Australia) Garth Tander (Australia) Cameron McConville	Holden Commodore VE	Holden Racing Team	161	+1.2s	5	258
4	14	(Australia) Jason Bright (New Zealand) Matt Halliday	Holden Commodore VE	Brad Jones Racing	161	+2.4s	8	240
5	18	(Australia) James Courtney (Australia) Warren Luff	Ford Falcon FG	Dick Johnson Racing	161	+6.2s	7	222
6	51	(New Zealand) Greg Murphy (Denmark) Allan Simonsen	Holden Commodore VE	Paul Morris Motorsport	161	+7.1s	9	204
7	33	(Australia) Lee Holdsworth (Australia) David Besnard	Holden Commodore VE	Garry Rogers Motorsport	161	+7.5s	4	192
8	39	(Australia) Russell Ingall (Australia) Paul Morris	Holden Commodore VE	Paul Morris Motorsport	161	+9.9s	16	180
9	5	(Australia) Mark Winterbottom (Australia) Luke Youlden	Ford Falcon FG	Ford Performance Racing	161	+10.8s	1	168
10	34	(Australia) Michael Caruso (Australia) Greg Ritter	Holden Commodore VE	Garry Rogers Motorsport	161	+11.3s	15	156
11	6	(New Zealand) Steven Richards (Australia) James Moffat	Ford Falcon FG	Ford Performance Racing	161	+12.3s	14	144
12	17	(Australia) Steven Johnson (Australia) Marcus Marshall	Ford Falcon FG	Dick Johnson Racing	161	+12.4s	11	138
13	4	(Australia) Alex Davison (Australia) David Brabham	Ford Falcon FG	Stone Brothers Racing	161	+17.7s	18	132
14	55	(Australia) Paul Dumbrell (Australia) Dean Canto	Ford Falcon FG	Rod Nash Racing	161	+19.1s	10	126
15	21	(Australia) Karl Reindler (Australia) David Wall	Holden Commodore VE	Britek Motorsport	161	+19.5s	22	120
16	15	(Australia) Rick Kelly (Australia) Owen Kelly	Holden Commodore VE	Kelly Racing	161	+26.5s	12	114
17	30	(Australia) Nathan Pretty (Australia) Mark Noske	Holden Commodore VE	Lucas Dumbrell Motorsport	161	+29.2s	26	108
18	47	(Australia) Tim Slade (Australia) Jack Perkins	Ford Falcon FG	James Rosenberg Racing	161	+29.5s	25	102
19	19	(Australia) Jonathon Webb (Australia) David Russell	Ford Falcon FG	Tekno Autosports	161	+2m 17.5s	17	96
20	7	(Australia) Todd Kelly (Australia) Dale Wood	Holden Commodore VE	Kelly Racing	160	+ 1 lap	27	90
21	9	(New Zealand) Shane van Gisbergen (New Zealand) John McIntyre	Ford Falcon FG	Stone Brothers Racing	158	+ 3 laps	13	84
22	16	(Australia) Tony Ricciardello (Australia) Taz Douglas	Holden Commodore VE	Kelly Racing	158	+ 3 laps	28	78
23	8	(New Zealand) Jason Richards (Australia) Andrew Jones	Holden Commodore VE	Brad Jones Racing	157	+ 4 laps	30	72
24	44	(Australia) Geoff Emery (Australia) Marcus Zukanovic (Australia) Rod Salmon	Holden Commodore VE	Greg Murphy Racing	156	+ 5 laps	29	66
25	10	(Australia) Andrew Thompson (Australia) Ryan Briscoe	Holden Commodore VE	Walkinshaw Racing	154	+ 7 laps	24	60
26	27	(New Zealand) Ant Pedersen (Australia) Damian Assaillit	Ford Falcon FG	MW Motorsport	153	+ 8 laps	31	54
Ret	22	(Australia) Will Davison (Australia) David Reynolds	Holden Commodore VE	Holden Racing Team	152	Accident	6	
Ret	11	(Australia) Jason Bargwanna (Australia) Glenn Seton	Holden Commodore VE	Kelly Racing	132	Engine	19	
Ret	12	(Australia) Dean Fiore (Australia) Michael Patrizi	Ford Falcon FG	Triple F Racing	56	Accident	23	
Ret	3	(Australia) Tony D'Alberto (Australia) Shane Price	Holden Commodore VE	Tony D'Alberto Racing	38	Accident	20	
Ret	24	(New Zealand) Fabian Coulthard (New Zealand) Craig Baird	Holden Commodore VE	Walkinshaw Racing	0	Accident	21	

== Championship Standings ==
After Race 18 of 26 races.

Pos	Name	Team	Points
1	(Australia) James Courtney	Dick Johnson Racing	2323
2	(Australia) Jamie Whincup	Triple Eight Race Engineering	2198
3	(Australia) Craig Lowndes	Triple Eight Race Engineering	2039
4	(Australia) Mark Winterbottom	Ford Performance Racing	2030
5	(Australia) Garth Tander	Holden Racing Team	1938

== Broadcast ==
The race was covered by the Seven Network for the fourth consecutive season.

Seven Network
Booth: Neil Crompton, Aaron Noonan, Matthew White
Pit-lane: Mark Beretta, Grant Denyer, Mark Larkham
