= 2015 Sandown 500 =

2015 V8 Supercar championship race

(Victoria (state)) 2015 Wilson Security Sandown 500
Event Information
- Round 9 of 14 in the 2015 International V8 Supercars Championship
- Date: 11–13 September 2015
- Location: Melbourne, Victoria
- Venue: Sandown International Raceway
- Weather: Fine

Results
Race 1
Distance	161 laps	500 km
Pole position	Jamie Whincup; Paul Dumbrell; Triple Eight Race Engineering	
Winner	Mark Winterbottom; Steve Owen; Prodrive Racing Australia	3:19:48.9226

The 2015 Wilson Security Sandown 500 was a motor race event for the Australian sedan-based V8 Supercars. It was the ninth event of the 2015 International V8 Supercars Championship. It was held on the weekend of 11-13 September at the Sandown Raceway, near Melbourne in Victoria, Australia. The feature race, the 2015 Wilson Security Sandown 500, was won by Mark Winterbottom and Steve Owen driving a Ford FG X Falcon.

== Results ==
=== Qualifying ===
Pos.	No.	Name	Team	Vehicle	Lap Time	Difference
1	6	(Australia) Chaz Mostert	Prodrive Racing Australia	Ford FG X Falcon	1:08.7165	
2	5	(Australia) Mark Winterbottom	Prodrive Racing Australia	Ford FG X Falcon	1:08.9069	+ 0.1904s
3	1	(Australia) Jamie Whincup	Triple Eight Race Engineering	Holden VF Commodore	1:09.0185	+ 0.3020s
4	18	(Australia) Lee Holdsworth	Charlie Schwerkolt Racing	Holden VF Commodore	1:09.0200	+ 0.3035s
5	55	(Australia) David Reynolds	Rod Nash Racing	Ford FG X Falcon	1:09.0642	+ 0.3477s
6	14	(New Zealand) Fabian Coulthard	Brad Jones Racing	Holden VF Commodore	1:09.1058	+ 0.3893s
7	97	(New Zealand) Shane van Gisbergen	Tekno Autosports	Holden VF Commodore	1:09.1132	+ 0.3967s
8	17	(Australia) Scott Pye	DJR Team Penske	Ford FG X Falcon	1:09.1221	+ 0.4056s
9	33	(New Zealand) Scott McLaughlin	Garry Rogers Motorsport	Volvo S60	1:09.1817	+ 0.4652s
10	2	(Australia) Garth Tander	Holden Racing Team	Holden VF Commodore	1:09.3031	+ 0.5866s
11	47	(Australia) Tim Slade	Walkinshaw Racing	Holden VF Commodore	1:09.3413	+ 0.6248s
12	22	(Australia) Jack Perkins	Holden Racing Team	Holden VF Commodore	1:09.4082	+ 0.6917s
13	3	(Australia) Tim Blanchard	Lucas Dumbrell Motorsport	Holden VF Commodore	1:09.4159	+ 0.6994s
14	8	(Australia) Jason Bright	Brad Jones Racing	Holden VF Commodore	1:09.4266	+ 0.7101s
15	222	(Australia) Nick Percat	Lucas Dumbrell Motorsport	Holden VF Commodore	1:09.4444	+ 0.7279s
16	888	(Australia) Craig Lowndes	Triple Eight Race Engineering	Holden VF Commodore	1:09.4692	+ 0.7527s
17	9	(Australia) Will Davison	Erebus Motorsport	Mercedes-Benz E63 AMG	1:09.5031	+ 0.7866s
18	99	(Australia) James Moffat	Nissan Motorsport	Nissan Altima L33	1:09.5071	+ 0.7906s
19	23	(Australia) Michael Caruso	Nissan Motorsport	Nissan Altima L33	1:09.5268	+ 0.8103s
20	15	(Australia) Rick Kelly	Nissan Motorsport	Nissan Altima L33	1:09.6198	+ 0.9033s
21	4	(Australia) Ashley Walsh	Erebus Motorsport	Mercedes-Benz E63 AMG	1:09.6530	+ 0.9365s
22	7	(Australia) Todd Kelly	Nissan Motorsport	Nissan Altima L33	1:09.6947	+ 0.9782s
23	111	(New Zealand) Andre Heimgartner	Super Black Racing	Ford FG X Falcon	1:09.7550	+ 1.0385s
24	34	(Australia) David Wall	Garry Rogers Motorsport	Volvo S60	1:09.7579	+ 1.0414s
25	21	(Australia) Dale Wood	Britek Motorsport	Holden VF Commodore	1:09.7858	+ 1.0693s

=== Qualifying Race 1 (Co-drivers) ===
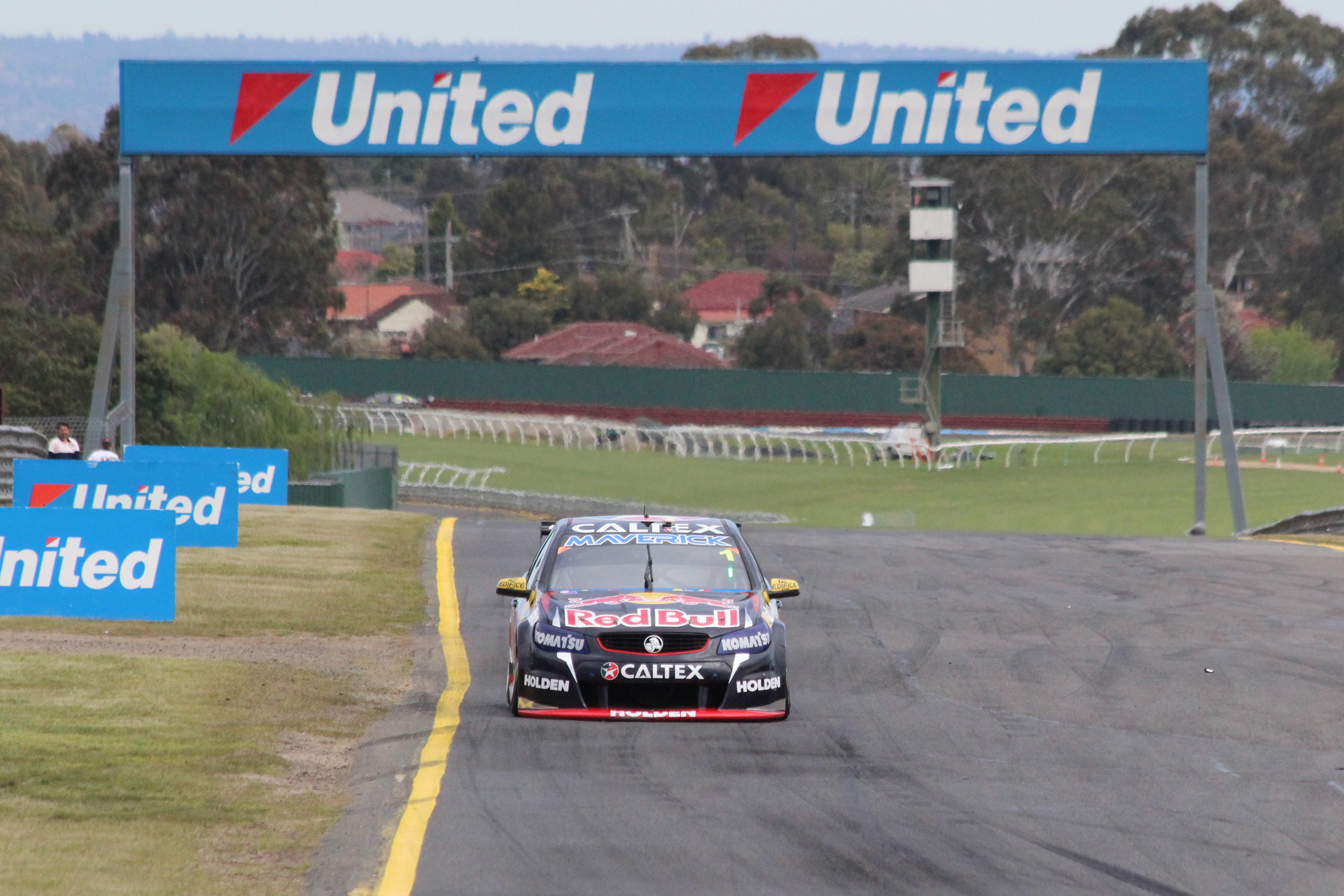
Paul Dumbrell won the first qualifying race, which was held for co-drivers only.

Pos.	No.	Name	Team	Vehicle	Laps	Time / Difference	Grid
1	1	(Australia) Paul Dumbrell	Triple Eight Race Engineering	Holden VF Commodore	20	23min 26.4669sec	3
2	5	(Australia) Steve Owen	Prodrive Racing Australia	Ford FG X Falcon	20	+ 7.122s	2
3	6	(Australia) Cam Waters	Prodrive Racing Australia	Ford FG X Falcon	20	+ 9.806s	1
4	55	(Australia) Dean Canto	Rod Nash Racing	Ford FG X Falcon	20	+ 10.984s	5
5	97	(Australia) Jonathon Webb	Tekno Autosports	Holden VF Commodore	20	+ 12.509s	7
6	22	(Australia) Russell Ingall	Holden Racing Team	Holden VF Commodore	20	+ 13.592s	12
7	47	(Australia) Tony D'Alberto	Walkinshaw Racing	Holden VF Commodore	20	+ 15.454s	11
8	17	(Australia) Marcos Ambrose	DJR Team Penske	Ford FG X Falcon	20	+ 15.819s	8
9	14	(Australia) Luke Youlden	Brad Jones Racing	Holden VF Commodore	20	+ 19.231s	6
10	3	(Australia) Karl Reindler	Lucas Dumbrell Motorsport	Holden VF Commodore	20	+ 20.696s	13
11	18	(France) Sébastien Bourdais	Charlie Schwerkolt Racing	Holden VF Commodore	20	+ 24.647s	4
12	888	(New Zealand) Steven Richards	Triple Eight Race Engineering	Holden VF Commodore	20	+ 25.441s	16
13	9	(Australia) Alex Davison	Erebus Motorsport	Mercedes-Benz E63 AMG	20	+ 29.383s	17
14	222	(United Kingdom) Oliver Gavin	Lucas Dumbrell Motorsport	Holden VF Commodore	20	+ 30.775s	15
15	111	(New Zealand) Ant Pedersen	Super Black Racing	Ford FG X Falcon	20	+ 33.121s	23
16	2	(Australia) Warren Luff	Holden Racing Team	Holden VF Commodore	20	+ 34.267s	10
17	23	(Australia) Dean Fiore	Nissan Motorsport	Nissan Altima L33	20	+ 35.594s	19
18	4	(Australia) Jack Le Brocq	Erebus Motorsport	Mercedes-Benz E63 AMG	20	+ 36.301s	21
19	21	(Australia) Macauley Jones	Britek Motorsport	Holden VF Commodore	20	+ 40.769s	25
20	99	(Australia) Taz Douglas	Nissan Motorsport	Nissan Altima L33	20	+ 40.957s	18
21	7	(United Kingdom) Alex Buncombe	Nissan Motorsport	Nissan Altima L33	20	+ 40.961s	22
22	33	(France) Alexandre Prémat	Garry Rogers Motorsport	Volvo S60	20	+ 41.420s	9
23	34	(New Zealand) Chris Pither	Garry Rogers Motorsport	Volvo S60	20	+ 42.433s	24
DNF	15	(Australia) David Russell	Nissan Motorsport	Nissan Altima L33	12	Suspension	20
DNF	8	(Australia) Andrew Jones	Brad Jones Racing	Holden VF Commodore	6	Accident damage	14

=== Qualifying Race 2 (Primary drivers) ===
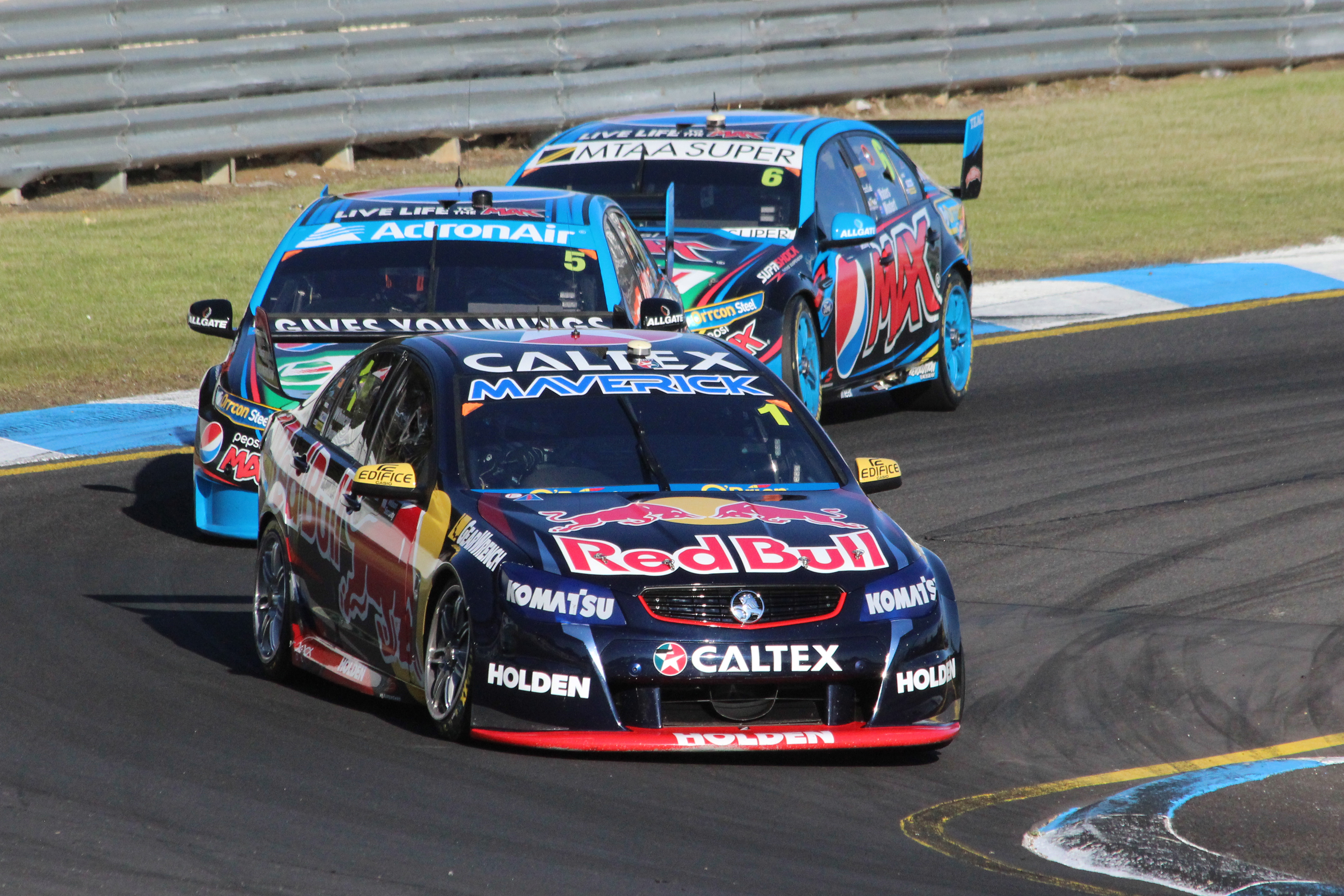
Jamie Whincup leads the second qualifying race, held for main drivers only, ahead of Mark Winterbottom and Chaz Mostert.

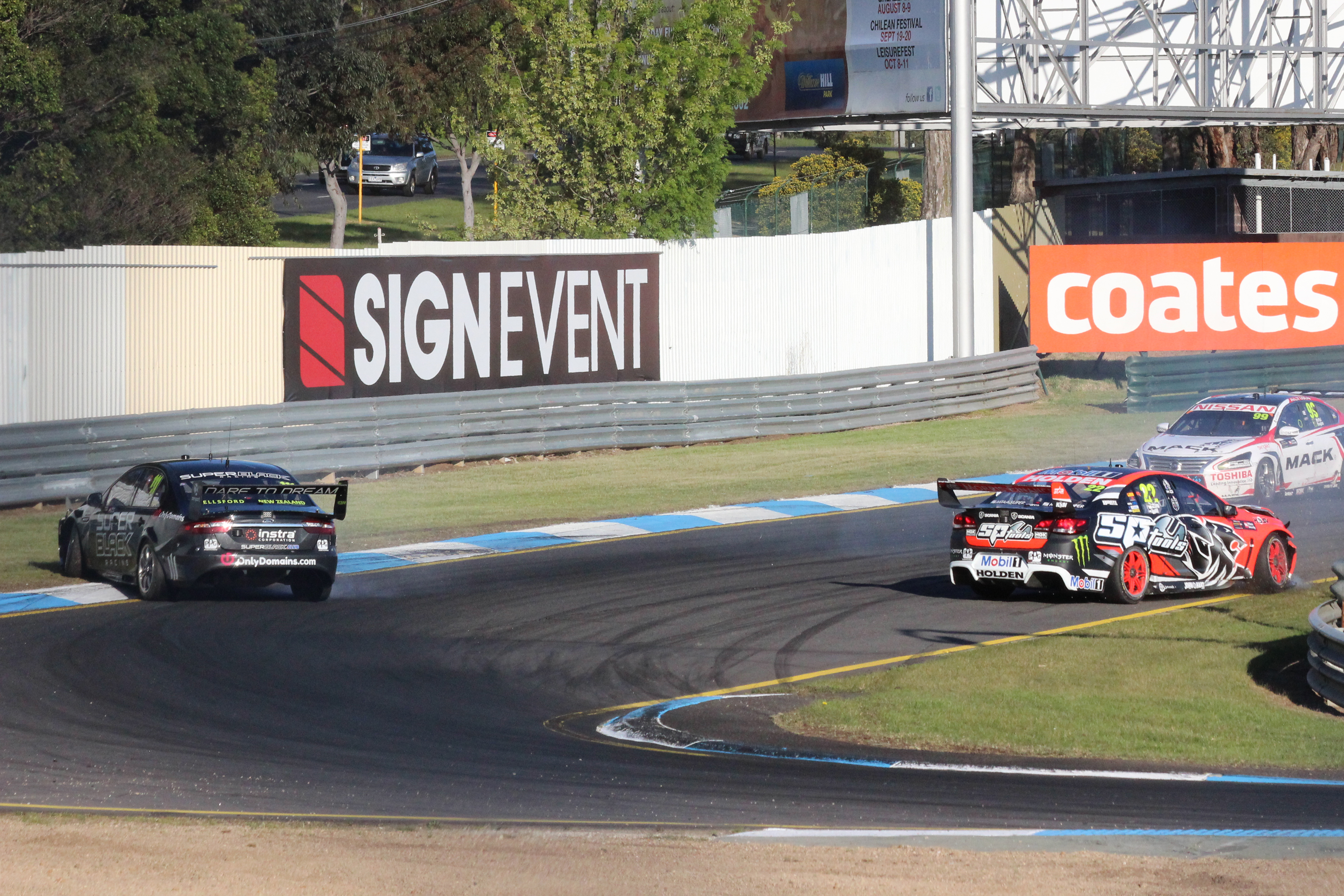
Andre Heimgartner and Jack Perkins come together during the second qualifying race. The incident saw both drivers retire from the race.

Pos.	No.	Name	Team	Vehicle	Laps	Time / Difference
1	1	(Australia) Jamie Whincup	Triple Eight Race Engineering	Holden VF Commodore	20	24min 35.3103sec
2	5	(Australia) Mark Winterbottom	Prodrive Racing Australia	Ford FG X Falcon	20	+ 0.806s
3	6	(Australia) Chaz Mostert	Prodrive Racing Australia	Ford FG X Falcon	20	+ 1.155s
4	97	(New Zealand) Shane van Gisbergen	Tekno Autosports	Holden VF Commodore	20	+ 1.800s
5	55	(Australia) David Reynolds	Rod Nash Racing	Ford FG X Falcon	20	+ 2.164s
6	47	(Australia) Tim Slade	Walkinshaw Racing	Holden VF Commodore	20	+ 2.354s
7	18	(Australia) Lee Holdsworth	Charlie Schwerkolt Racing	Holden VF Commodore	20	+ 2.879s
8	9	(Australia) Will Davison	Erebus Motorsport	Mercedes-Benz E63 AMG	20	+ 3.298s
9	14	(New Zealand) Fabian Coulthard	Brad Jones Racing	Holden VF Commodore	20	+ 3.475s
10	222	(Australia) Nick Percat	Lucas Dumbrell Motorsport	Holden VF Commodore	20	+ 3.920s
11	17	(Australia) Scott Pye	DJR Team Penske	Ford FG X Falcon	20	+ 4.401s
12	2	(Australia) Garth Tander	Holden Racing Team	Holden VF Commodore	20	+ 4.783s
13	21	(Australia) Dale Wood	Britek Motorsport	Holden VF Commodore	20	+ 5.361s
14	15	(Australia) Rick Kelly	Nissan Motorsport	Nissan Altima L33	20	+ 5.724s
15	3	(Australia) Tim Blanchard	Lucas Dumbrell Motorsport	Holden VF Commodore	20	+ 6.107s
16	33	(New Zealand) Scott McLaughlin	Garry Rogers Motorsport	Volvo S60	20	+ 6.720s
17	8	(Australia) Jason Bright	Brad Jones Racing	Holden VF Commodore	20	+ 7.884s
18	34	(Australia) David Wall	Garry Rogers Motorsport	Volvo S60	20	+ 8.648s
19	4	(Australia) Ashley Walsh	Erebus Motorsport	Mercedes-Benz E63 AMG	20	+ 8.919s
20	99	(Australia) James Moffat	Nissan Motorsport	Nissan Altima L33	20	+ 9.081s
21	23	(Australia) Michael Caruso	Nissan Motorsport	Nissan Altima L33	20	+ 9.271s
22	7	(Australia) Todd Kelly	Nissan Motorsport	Nissan Altima L33	20	+ 9.713s
23	888	(Australia) Craig Lowndes	Triple Eight Race Engineering	Holden VF Commodore	20	+ 10.686s
DNF	22	(Australia) Jack Perkins	Holden Racing Team	Holden VF Commodore	18	Accident damage
DNF	111	(New Zealand) Andre Heimgartner	Super Black Racing	Ford FG X Falcon	16	Accident damage

=== Race ===
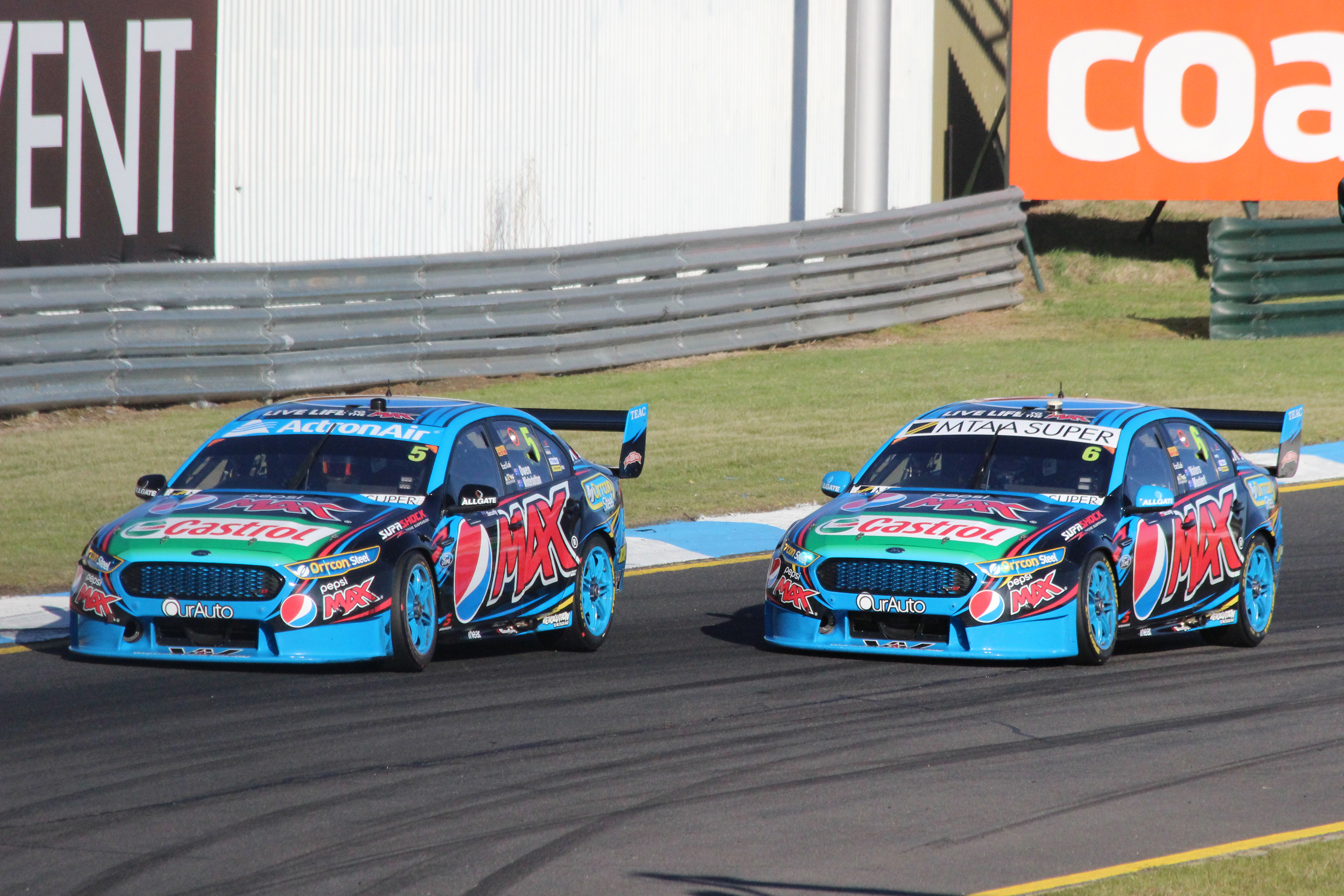
Prodrive Racing Australia scored a 1–2 finish in the race, with Mark Winterbottom and Steve Owen taking victory ahead of Chaz Mostert and Cam Waters.

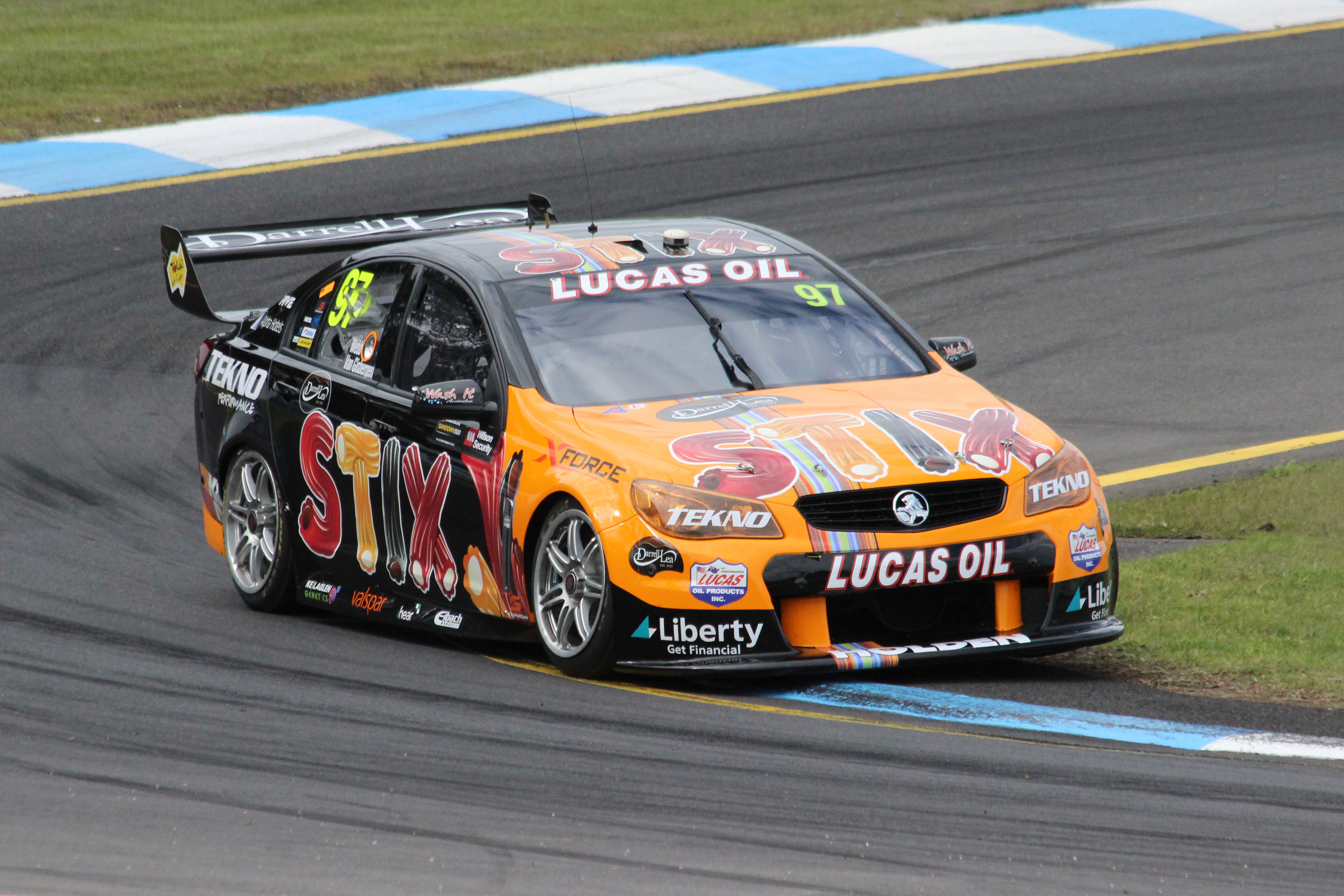
Shane van Gisbergen and Jonathon Webb finished in third place, driving for Tekno Autosports.

Pos.	No.	Name	Team	Vehicle	Laps	Time / Difference	Grid	Pts
1	5	(Australia) Mark Winterbottom (Australia) Steve Owen	Prodrive Racing Australia	Ford FG X Falcon	161	3h 19m 48.9230s	2	300
2	6	(Australia) Chaz Mostert (Australia) Cam Waters	Prodrive Racing Australia	Ford FG X Falcon	161	+ 0.659s	3	276
3	97	(New Zealand) Shane van Gisbergen (Australia) Jonathon Webb	Tekno Autosports	Holden VF Commodore	161	+ 9.657s	4	258
4	2	(Australia) Garth Tander (Australia) Warren Luff	Holden Racing Team	Holden VF Commodore	161	+ 9.927s	12	240
5	55	(Australia) David Reynolds (Australia) Dean Canto	Rod Nash Racing	Ford FG X Falcon	161	+ 11.112s	5	222
6	47	(Australia) Tim Slade (Australia) Tony D'Alberto	Walkinshaw Racing	Holden VF Commodore	161	+ 13.183s	6	204
7	18	(Australia) Lee Holdsworth (France) Sébastien Bourdais	Charlie Schwerkolt Racing	Holden VF Commodore	161	+ 17.012s	7	192
8	3	(Australia) Tim Blanchard (Australia) Karl Reindler	Lucas Dumbrell Motorsport	Holden VF Commodore	161	+ 19.876s	15	180
9	22	(Australia) Jack Perkins (Australia) Russell Ingall	Holden Racing Team	Holden VF Commodore	161	+ 20.758s	24	168
10	15	(Australia) Rick Kelly (Australia) David Russell	Nissan Motorsport	Nissan Altima L33	161	+ 21.938s	14	156
11	23	(Australia) Michael Caruso (Australia) Dean Fiore	Nissan Motorsport	Nissan Altima L33	161	+ 25.465s	21	144
12	17	(Australia) Scott Pye (Australia) Marcos Ambrose	DJR Team Penske	Ford FG X Falcon	161	+ 25.882s	11	138
13	888	(Australia) Craig Lowndes (New Zealand) Steven Richards	Triple Eight Race Engineering	Holden VF Commodore	161	+ 26.396s	23	132
14	33	(New Zealand) Scott McLaughlin (France) Alexandre Prémat	Garry Rogers Motorsport	Volvo S60	161	+ 26.983s	16	126
15	1	(Australia) Jamie Whincup (Australia) Paul Dumbrell	Triple Eight Race Engineering	Holden VF Commodore	161	+ 27.788s	1	120
16	14	(New Zealand) Fabian Coulthard (Australia) Luke Youlden	Brad Jones Racing	Holden VF Commodore	161	+ 27.798s	9	114
17	111	(New Zealand) Andre Heimgartner (New Zealand) Ant Pedersen	Super Black Racing	Ford FG X Falcon	161	+ 28.571s	25	108
18	99	(Australia) James Moffat (Australia) Taz Douglas	Nissan Motorsport	Nissan Altima L33	161	+ 31.753s	20	102
19	4	(Australia) Ashley Walsh (Australia) Jack Le Brocq	Erebus Motorsport	Mercedes-Benz E63 AMG	161	+ 36.725s	19	96
20	21	(Australia) Dale Wood (Australia) Macauley Jones	Britek Motorsport	Holden VF Commodore	161	+ 40.053s	13	90
21	34	(Australia) David Wall (New Zealand) Chris Pither	Garry Rogers Motorsport	Volvo S60	160	+ 1 Lap	18	84
22	8	(Australia) Jason Bright (Australia) Andrew Jones	Brad Jones Racing	Holden VF Commodore	160	+ 1 Lap	17	78
23	9	(Australia) Will Davison (Australia) Alex Davison	Erebus Motorsport	Mercedes-Benz E63 AMG	154	+ 7 Laps	8	72
24	7	(Australia) Todd Kelly (United Kingdom) Alex Buncombe	Nissan Motorsport	Nissan Altima L33	147	+ 14 Laps	22	66
Ret	222	(Australia) (Nick Percat) (United Kingdom) Oliver Gavin	Lucas Dumbrell Motorsport	Holden VF Commodore	18	Steering	10	0

Note: Percat did not drive car #222 in the main race.
