= 2010 L&H 500 =

2010 V8 supercar race

(Victoria (state)) 2010 L&H 500
Event Information
- Round 9 of 14 in the 2010 V8 Supercar Championship Series
- Date: 10–12 September 2010
- Location: Phillip Island, Victoria
- Venue: Phillip Island Grand Prix Circuit
- Weather: Fine

Results
Race 1
Distance	113 laps	500 km
Pole position	Jamie Whincup; Steve Owen; Triple Eight Race Engineering	71 pts
Winner	Craig Lowndes; Mark Skaife; Triple Eight Race Engineering	3:11:47.3551

The 2010 L&H 500 was the ninth event of the 2010 V8 Supercar Championship Series. It was held on the weekend of 10 to 12 September at the Phillip Island Grand Prix Circuit in Victoria, Australia. The 2010 event was the tenth running of the Phillip Island 500 and it marked the third time that the Phillip Island circuit had served as the venue for the annual 500 kilometre two-driver V8 Supercar race. The event consisted of two Qualifying sessions, two Qualifying Races and a 500 kilometre race which was Race 17 of the Championship. The two drivers nominated for each car contested separate qualifying sessions and, unique to this event, two preliminary 14 lap Qualifying Races were held on Saturday with the two drivers of each car starting one race each. A single pitstop by each car in either race was mandated with the combined results of the two races determining the grid order for the main 500 kilometre race. Championship points were awarded for each of the three races, however the finishing positions of the "L & H 500" were determined by the finishing positions at the end of Race 17, regardless of the total number of points accumulated by any driver pairing at the event.

The 500 kilometre race was dominated by the Triple Eight Race Engineering team and was won by Craig Lowndes and Mark Skaife. Engine trouble struck teammates Jamie Whincup and Steve Owen while leading and saw them finish last of the classified finishers. The win gave Skaife his 40th career round win in the series, increasing his record tally. Late in the race Ford Performance Racing's lead driver, Mark Winterbottom overtook Jason Richards for second place which saw himself and co-driver Luke Youlden finish best of the Ford entries, ahead of Richards and Andrew Jones in the Brad Jones Racing Commodore.

== Results ==
=== Race 1 Qualifying session ===
Pos	No	Name	Car	Team	Time
Pole	1	(Australia) Steve Owen	Holden VE Commodore	Triple Eight Race Engineering	1:32.3273
2	18	(Australia) Warren Luff	Ford FG Falcon	Dick Johnson Racing	1:32.5503
3	9	(New Zealand) Shane van Gisbergen	Ford FG Falcon	Stone Brothers Racing	1:32.8630
4	2	(Australia) Garth Tander	Holden VE Commodore	Holden Racing Team	1:32.9658
5	11	(Australia) Jason Bargwanna	Holden VE Commodore	Kelly Racing	1:32.9768
6	47	(Australia) Jack Perkins	Ford FG Falcon	James Rosenberg Racing	1:33.0122
7	5	(Australia) Luke Youlden	Ford FG Falcon	Ford Performance Racing	1:33.0242
8	7	(Australia) Todd Kelly	Holden VE Commodore	Kelly Racing	1:33.0411
9	22	(Australia) David Reynolds	Holden VE Commodore	Holden Racing Team	1:33.0729
10	888	(Australia) Mark Skaife	Holden VE Commodore	Triple Eight Race Engineering	1:33.1895
11	8	(New Zealand) Jason Richards	Holden VE Commodore	Brad Jones Racing	1:33.2307
12	17	(Australia) Steven Johnson	Ford FG Falcon	Dick Johnson Racing	1:33.2481
13	55	(Australia) Dean Canto	Ford FG Falcon	Rod Nash Racing	1:33.2546
14	33	(Australia) David Besnard	Holden VE Commodore	Garry Rogers Motorsport	1:33.3065
15	34	(Australia) Michael Caruso	Holden VE Commodore	Garry Rogers Motorsport	1:33.3097
16	51	(New Zealand) Greg Murphy	Holden VE Commodore	Paul Morris Motorsport	1:33.3287
17	12	(Australia) Dean Fiore	Ford FG Falcon	Triple F Racing	1:33.6898
18	19	(Australia) Jonathon Webb	Ford FG Falcon	Tekno Autosports	1:33.6898
19	15	(Australia) Owen Kelly	Holden VE Commodore	Kelly Racing	1:33.8094
20	10	(Australia) Andrew Thompson	Holden VE Commodore	Paul Weel Racing	1:33.8457
21	24	(New Zealand) Craig Baird	Holden VE Commodore	Walkinshaw Racing	1:33.9172
22	3	(Australia) Tony D'Alberto	Holden VE Commodore	Tony D'Alberto Racing	1:33.9884
23	14	(New Zealand) Matt Halliday	Holden VE Commodore	Brad Jones Racing	1:34.0569
24	4	(Australia) David Brabham	Ford FG Falcon	Stone Brothers Racing	1:34.0743
25	30	(Australia) Mark Noske	Holden VE Commodore	Lucas Dumbrell Motorsport	1:34.0890
26	39	(Australia) Paul Morris	Holden VE Commodore	Paul Morris Motorsport	1:34.3146
27	16	(Australia) Taz Douglas	Holden VE Commodore	Kelly Racing	1:34.6364
28	27	(New Zealand) Ant Pedersen	Ford BF Falcon	MW Motorsport	1:34.7346
29	6	(Australia) James Moffat	Ford FG Falcon	Ford Performance Racing	no time
DSQ	44	(Australia) Marcus Zukanovic	Holden VE Commodore	Greg Murphy Racing	no time
DNP	21	(Australia) Karl Reindler	Holden VE Commodore	Britek Motorsport	no time

=== Race 2 Qualifying session ===
Pos	No	Name	Car	Team	Time
Pole	15	(Australia) Rick Kelly	Holden VE Commodore	Kelly Racing	1:32.4448
2	1	(Australia) Jamie Whincup	Holden VE Commodore	Triple Eight Race Engineering	1:32.4631
3	888	(Australia) Craig Lowndes	Holden VE Commodore	Triple Eight Race Engineering	1:32.5541
4	18	(Australia) James Courtney	Ford FG Falcon	Dick Johnson Racing	1:32.6858
5	5	(Australia) Mark Winterbottom	Ford FG Falcon	Ford Performance Racing	1:32.7817
6	22	(Australia) Will Davison	Holden VE Commodore	Holden Racing Team	1:33.0556
7	17	(Australia) Marcus Marshall	Ford FG Falcon	Dick Johnson Racing	1:33.0653
8	6	(New Zealand) Steven Richards	Ford FG Falcon	Ford Performance Racing	1:33.0748
9	33	(Australia) Lee Holdsworth	Holden VE Commodore	Garry Rogers Motorsport	1:33.1203
10	55	(Australia) Paul Dumbrell	Ford FG Falcon	Rod Nash Racing	1:33.2298
11	47	(Australia) Tim Slade	Ford FG Falcon	James Rosenberg Racing	1:33.2338
12	9	(New Zealand) John McIntyre	Ford FG Falcon	Stone Brothers Racing	1:33.3018
13	3	(Australia) Shane Price	Holden VE Commodore	Tony D'Alberto Racing	1:33.3023
14	2	(Australia) Cameron McConville	Holden VE Commodore	Holden Racing Team	1:33.3206
15	34	(Australia) Greg Ritter	Holden VE Commodore	Garry Rogers Motorsport	1:33.4380
16	24	(New Zealand) Fabian Coulthard	Holden VE Commodore	Walkinshaw Racing	1:33.4820
17	7	(Australia) Dale Wood	Holden VE Commodore	Kelly Racing	1:33.5265
18	4	(Australia) Alex Davison	Ford FG Falcon	Stone Brothers Racing	1:33.5359
19	14	(Australia) Jason Bright	Holden VE Commodore	Brad Jones Racing	1:33.5613
20	39	(Australia) Russell Ingall	Holden VE Commodore	Paul Morris Motorsport	1:33.6267
21	19	(Australia) David Russell	Ford FG Falcon	Tekno Autosports	1:33.7614
22	12	(Australia) Michael Patrizi	Ford FG Falcon	Triple F Racing	1:33.7697
24	10	(Australia) Nick Percat	Holden VE Commodore	Walkinshaw Racing	1:34.1781
25	8	(Australia) Andrew Jones	Holden VE Commodore	Brad Jones Racing	1:34.1928
25	30	(Australia) Nathan Pretty	Holden VE Commodore	Lucas Dumbrell Motorsport	1:34.1387
26	51	(Australia) Tim Blanchard	Holden VE Commodore	Paul Morris Motorsport	1:34.4266
27	11	(Australia) Glenn Seton	Holden VE Commodore	Kelly Racing	1:34.5601
28	27	(Australia) Damian Assaillit	Ford BF Falcon	MW Motorsport	1:34.6570
29	44	(Australia) Geoff Emery	Holden VE Commodore	Greg Murphy Racing	1:34.7542
30	16	(Australia) Tony Ricciardello	Holden VE Commodore	Kelly Racing	1:34.7997
31	21	(Australia) David Wall	Holden VE Commodore	Britek Motorsport	1:34.8859

=== Qualifying Race 1 ===
Qualifying Race 1 was won by Steve Owen (Holden VE Commodore) from Jason Bargwanna (Holden VE Commodore) and Shane van Gisbergen (Ford FG Falcon).

=== Qualifying Race 2 ===
Qualifying Race 2 was won by Rick Kelly (Holden VE Commodore) from Craig Lowndes (Holden VE Commodore) and James Courtney (Ford FG Falcon).

=== L&H 500 ===
Pos	No	Driver	Car	Team	Laps	Time/retired	Grid
1	888	(Australia) Craig Lowndes (Australia) Mark Skaife	Holden VE Commodore	Triple Eight Race Engineering	113	3:11:47.3551	
2	5	(Australia) Mark Winterbottom (Australia) Luke Youlden	Ford FG Falcon	Ford Performance Racing	113	+3.3s	
3	8	(New Zealand) Jason Richards (Australia) Andrew Jones	Holden VE Commodore	Brad Jones Racing	113	+5.0s	
4	15	(Australia) Rick Kelly (Australia) Owen Kelly	Holden VE Commodore	Kelly Racing	113	+5.7s	
5	47	(Australia) Tim Slade (Australia) Jack Perkins	Ford FG Falcon	James Rosenberg Racing	113	+19.7s	
6	19	(Australia) Jonathon Webb (Australia) David Russell	Ford FG Falcon	Tekno Autosports	113	+28.5s	
7	55	(Australia) Paul Dumbrell (Australia) Dean Canto	Ford FG Falcon	Rod Nash Racing	113	+29.9s	
8	39	(Australia) Russell Ingall (Australia) Paul Morris	Holden VE Commodore	Paul Morris Motorsport	113	+30.1s	
9	2	(Australia) Garth Tander (Australia) Cameron McConville	Holden VE Commodore	Holden Racing Team	113	+31.5s	
10	4	(Australia) Alex Davison (Australia) David Brabham	Ford FG Falcon	Stone Brothers Racing	113	+35.7s	
11	34	(Australia) Michael Caruso (Australia) Greg Ritter	Holden VE Commodore	Garry Rogers Motorsport	113	+38.2s	
12	18	(Australia) James Courtney (Australia) Warren Luff	Ford FG Falcon	Dick Johnson Racing	113	+39.1s	
13	51	(New Zealand) Greg Murphy (Australia) Tim Blanchard	Holden VE Commodore	Paul Morris Motorsport	113	+39.5s	
14	12	(Australia) Dean Fiore (Australia) Michael Patrizi	Ford FG Falcon	Triple F Racing	113	+40.8s	
15	3	(Australia) Tony D'Alberto (Australia) Shane Price	Holden VE Commodore	Tony D'Alberto Racing	113	+41.6s	
16	17	(Australia) Steven Johnson (Australia) Marcus Marshall	Ford FG Falcon	Dick Johnson Racing	113	+41.9s	
17	21	(Australia) Karl Reindler (Australia) David Wall	Holden VE Commodore	Britek Motorsport	113	+51.1s	
18	7	(Australia) Todd Kelly (Australia) Dale Wood	Holden VE Commodore	Kelly Racing	113	+53.1s	
19	24	(New Zealand) Fabian Coulthard (New Zealand) Craig Baird	Holden VE Commodore	Walkinshaw Racing	113	+53.7s	
20	11	(Australia) Jason Bargwanna (Australia) Glenn Seton	Holden VE Commodore	Kelly Racing	113	+1m 25.0s	
21	6	(New Zealand) Steven Richards (Australia) James Moffat	Ford FG Falcon	Ford Performance Racing	112	+ 1 lap	
22	27	(Australia) Damian Assaillit (New Zealand) Ant Pedersen	Ford BF Falcon	MW Motorsport	112	+ 1 lap	
23	44	(Australia) Geoff Emery (Australia) Marcus Zukanovic	Holden VE Commodore	Greg Murphy Racing	112	+ 1 lap	
24	30	(Australia) Mark Noske (Australia) Nathan Pretty	Holden VE Commodore	Lucas Dumbrell Motorsport	112	+ 1 lap	
25	16	(Australia) Tony Ricciardello (Australia) Taz Douglas	Holden VE Commodore	Kelly Racing	112	+ 1 lap	
26	10	(Australia) Andrew Thompson (Australia) Nick Percat	Holden VE Commodore	Walkinshaw Racing	111	+ 2 laps	
27	9	(New Zealand) Shane van Gisbergen (New Zealand) John McIntyre	Ford FG Falcon	Stone Brothers Racing	110	+ 3 laps	
28	22	(Australia) Will Davison (Australia) David Reynolds	Holden VE Commodore	Holden Racing Team	109	+ 4 laps	
29	1	(Australia) Jamie Whincup (Australia) Steve Owen	Holden VE Commodore	Triple Eight Race Engineering	104	+ 9 laps	
Ret	33	(Australia) Lee Holdsworth (Australia) David Besnard	Holden VE Commodore	Garry Rogers Motorsport	68		
Ret	14	(Australia) Jason Bright (New Zealand) Matt Halliday	Holden VE Commodore	Brad Jones Racing	55		
