= Steve Owen (racing driver) =

Australian racing driver

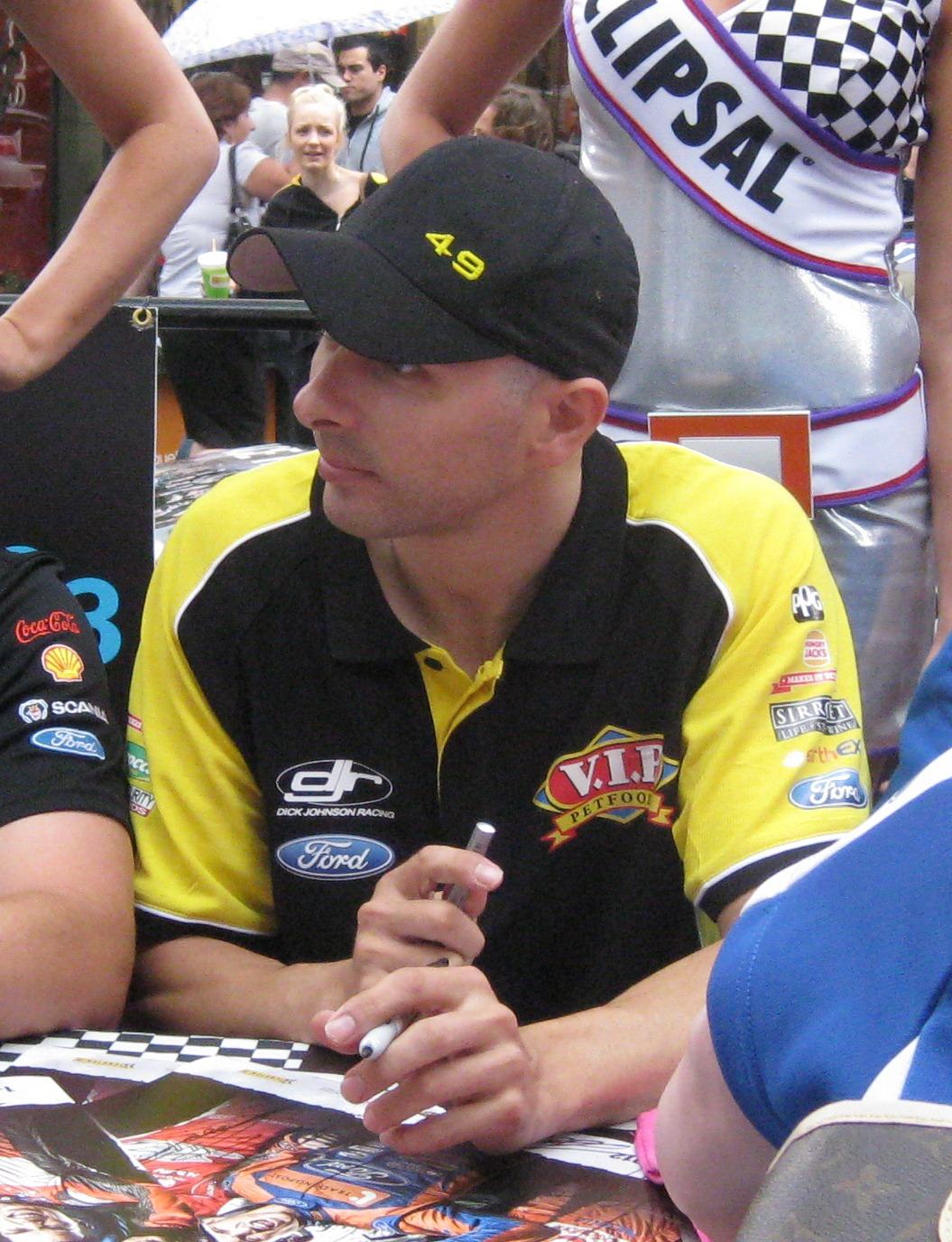
- Owen at the 2012 Clipsal 500 Adelaide
- Nationality: Australian
- Born: 18 December 1974 (age 51) Melbourne, Victoria
- Categorisation: FIA Gold (until 2016); FIA Silver (2017–)

Supercars Championship career
- Current team: Team Sydney by Tekno (Endurance race co-driver)
- Championships: 0
- Races: 186
- Wins: 3
- Podiums: 7
- Pole positions: 2
- 2011 position: 17th (1561 pts)

Steve Owen (born 18 December 1974) is an Australian racing driver. He has competed in many forms of motorsport, including Karts, Formula Ford, Formula Holden, Sprint cars and Supercars. He is one of three dual winners of the Dunlop Super2 Series, alongside Dean Canto and Paul Dumbrell.

== Career ==
Owen is a two-time winner of the V8 Supercar Development series, having won it in 2008 for Scott Loadsman Racing and 2010 for Greg Murphy Racing. Owen also has many years experience racing in Australia's leading motor racing series, the Supercars Championship.

Owen's most significant achievements in the Supercars Championship have been winning the 2015 Wilson Security Sandown 500 driving with Mark Winterbottom and a race win at the 2010 Armor All Gold Coast 600 as a co-driver for Jamie Whincup. He has also scored several podiums, most notably second at the 2010 and 2015 editions of the Bathurst 1000, and third at the 2013 Wilson Security Sandown 500.

== Career results ==
Season	Series	Position	Car	Team
1998	Australian Formula Ford Championship	9th	Spectrum 06B - Ford	Team Arrow
1999	Australian Formula Ford Championship	**2nd**	Spectrum 07 - Ford	Garry Rogers Valvoline / Cummins
1999	Shell Championship Series	42nd	Holden VT Commodore	Garry Rogers Motorsport
2000	Australian Drivers' Championship	10th	Reynard 97D Holden	Hocking Motorsport
2000	Formula Holden Tasman Cup	5th	Reynard 97D Holden	Hocking Motorsport
2001	Shell Championship Series	70th	Holden VT Commodore	Imrie Motor Sport
2002	Konica V8 Supercar Series	4th	Holden VT Commodore	Imrie Motor Sport
2002	V8 Supercar Championship Series	47th	Ford AU Falcon	Briggs Motor Sport
2003	Konica V8 Supercar Series	26th	Holden VX Commodore	Imrie Motor Sport
2003	V8 Supercar Championship Series	60th	Holden VX Commodore	Robert Smith Racing
2004	Australian Formula Ford Championship	**3rd**	Spectrum 010 - Ford	Bosch Batteries
2004	Konica Minolta V8 Supercar Series	38th	Holden VX Commodore	John Faulkner Racing
2004	V8 Supercar Championship Series	49th	Holden VY Commodore	K-Mart Racing
2005	V8 Supercar Championship Series	32nd	Ford BA Falcon	Britek Motorsport
2006	V8 Supercar Championship Series	22nd	Holden VZ Commodore	Rod Nash Racing
2007	V8 Supercar Championship Series	19th	Holden VZ Commodore	Rod Nash Racing
2008	Fujitsu V8 Supercar Series	**1st**	Holden VZ Commodore	Scott Loadsman Racing
2008	V8 Supercar Championship Series	32nd	Ford BF Falcon	Dick Johnson Racing; Team Kiwi Racing
2009	V8 Touring Car National Series	7th	Holden VX Commodore	Power Plus 98
2009	V8 Supercar Championship Series	39th	Holden VE Commodore	Walkinshaw Racing
2010	Fujitsu V8 Supercar Series	**1st**	Holden VE Commodore	Greg Murphy Racing
2010	V8 Supercar Championship Series	31st	Holden VE Commodore	Triple Eight Race Engineering
2011	International V8 Supercars Championship	17th	Holden VE Commodore	Paul Morris Motorsport
2012	V8SuperTourer Championship	34th	Holden VE Commodore	MPC Motorsport
2012	International V8 Supercars Championship	20th	Ford FG Falcon	Paul Morris Motorsport
2013	Dunlop V8 Supercar Series	5th	Ford FG Falcon	MW Motorsport
2013	International V8 Supercars Championship	32nd	Ford FG Falcon	Ford Performance Racing
2014	International V8 Supercars Championship	29th	Ford FG Falcon	Ford Performance Racing
2014	Australian GT Championship	15th	Porsche 911 GT3-R	Supabarn Supermarkets
2014	Dunlop V8 Supercar Series	25th	Ford FG Falcon	MW Motorsport
2015	Australian GT Championship (Trophy Div.)	6th	Porsche 911 GT3-S; Ford GT GT3	Supabarn Supermarkets; Supaloc Racing
2015	International V8 Supercars Championship	29th	Ford FG X Falcon	Prodrive Racing Australia
2016	International V8 Supercars Championship	32nd	Ford FG X Falcon	Rod Nash Racing
2016	Supercars Dunlop Series	25th	Ford FG Falcon	Image Racing
2017	Virgin Australia Supercars Championship	25th	Ford FG X Falcon	Rod Nash Racing
2018	Virgin Australia Supercars Championship	51st	Ford FG X Falcon	Tickford Racing
2020	Virgin Australia Supercars Championship	41st	Holden ZB Commodore	Team Sydney by Tekno

=== Super3 Series results ===
(Races in bold indicate pole position) (Races in italics indicate fastest lap)

Super3 Series results
Year	Team	No.	Car	1	2	3	4	5	6	7	8	9	10	11	12	13	14	15	Position	Points
2009	Power Plus 98	98	Holden VX Commodore	WAK; R1	WAK; R2	WAK; R3	MAL; R4	MAL; R5	MAL; R6	**WIN**; **R7**; 1	**WIN**; **R8**; 6	WIN; R9; 5	ORA; R10	ORA; R11	ORA; R12	**SAN**; **R13**; 1	**SAN**; **R14**; 1	**SAN**; **R15**; 1	7th	205

=== Super2 Series results ===
(Races in bold indicate pole position) (Races in italics indicate fastest lap)

Super2 Series results
Year	Team	No.	Car	1	2	3	4	5	6	7	8	9	10	11	12	13	14	15	16	17	18	Position	Points
2002	Imrie Motor Sport	13	Holden VT Commodore	WAK; R1	WAK; R2	WAK; R3	PHI; R4; 10	PHI; R5; 6	PHI; R6; 6	ORA; R7; Ret	ORA; R8; 4	ORA; R9; 7	WIN; R10; 14	WIN; R11; 2	WIN; R12; 2	MAL; R13; 2	MAL; R14; 6	MAL; R15; 2				13th	579
2003	Imrie Motor Sport	14	Holden VX Commodore	WAK; R1	WAK; R2	WAK; R3	ADE; R4	EAS; R5	EAS; R6	EAS; R7	PHI; R8; 27	PHI; R9; 8	PHI; R10; 5	WIN; R11; Ret	WIN; R12; 6	WIN; R13; 5	MAL; R14; 8	MAL; R15; 10	MAL; R16; Ret			26th	238
2004	Holden Young Lions	46	Holden VX Commodore	WAK; R1	WAK; R2	WAK; R3	ADE; R4	ADE; R5	WIN; R6; Ret	WIN; R7; 2	WIN; R8; Ret	EAS; R9	EAS; R10	EAS; R11	QLD; R12	QLD; R13	QLD; R14	MAL; R15	MAL; R16	MAL; R17		38th	62
2008	Loadsman Racing Team	62	Holden VZ Commodore	ADE; R1; 1	**ADE**; **R2**; 1	**WAK**; **R3**; 1	WAK; R4; 2	WAK; R5; 14	SAN; R6; 1	**SAN**; **R7**; 10	SAN; R8; 1	QLD; R9; 2	QLD; R10; 3	QLD; R11; 2	**WIN**; **R12**; 2	**WIN**; **R13**; 1	**WIN**; **R14**; 1	**BAT**; **R15**; 4	BAT; R16; 3	**ORA**; **R17**; 5	ORA; R18; 17	1st	1762
2010	Greg Murphy Racing	45	Holden VE Commodore	**ADE**; **R1**; 1	**ADE**; **R2**; 1	**QLD**; **R3**; 2	QLD; R4; 1	**QLD**; **R5**; 2	**WIN**; **R6**; 2	WIN; R7; 4	WIN; R8; 2	**TOW**; **R9**; 1	**TOW**; **R10**; 1	**TOW**; **R11**; 15	BAT; R12; 2	BAT; R13; 17	**SAN**; **R14**; 1	**SAN**; **R15**; 5	SAN; R16; 3	**SYD**; **R17**; 1	**SYD**; **R18**; 1	1st	1835
2013	MW Motorsport	99	Ford FG Falcon	ADE; R1	ADE; R2	**BAR**; **R3**; Ret	BAR; R4; 10	BAR; R5; 9	**TOW**; **R6**; 1	TOW; R7; 5	**TOW**; **R8**; 1	QLD; R9; 3	QLD; R10; 5	QLD; R11; 2	WIN; R12; Ret	WIN; R13; 18	WIN; R14; 9	**BAT**; **R15**; 1	**BAT**; **R16**; 1	SYD; R17; 2	SYD; R18; 1	5th	1315
2014	MW Motorsport	27	Ford FG Falcon	ADE; R1	ADE; R2	**WIN**; **R3**; 2	WIN; R4; 8	BAR; R5	BAR; R6	TOW; R7	TOW; R8	QLD; R9	QLD; R10									25th	420
2014	MW Motorsport	26	Ford FG Falcon											BAT; R11; 7	SYD; R12	SYD; R13						25th	420
2016	Image Racing	10	Ford FG Falcon	ADE; R1; 6	ADE; R2; 8	PHI; R3	PHI; R4	PHI; R5	BAR; R6	BAR; R7	BAR; R8	TOW; R9	TOW; R10	SAN; R11	SAN; R12	SAN; R13	BAT; R14	SYD; R15	SYD; R16			25th	192

=== Supercars Championship results ===
(Races in bold indicate pole position) (Races in italics indicate fastest lap)

Supercars results
Year	Team	No.	Car	1	2	3	4	5	6	7	8	9	10	11	12	13	14	15	16	17	18	19	20	21	22	23	24	25	26	27	28	29	30	31	32	33	34	35	36	37	38	39	Position	Points
1999	Garry Rogers Motorsport	35	Holden VT Commodore	EAS; R1	EAS; R2	EAS; R3	ADE; R4	BAR; R5	BAR; R6	BAR; R7	PHI; R8	PHI; R9	PHI; R10	HDV; R11	HDV; R12	HDV; R13	SAN; R14	SAN; R15	SAN; R16	QLD; R17	QLD; R18	QLD; R19	CAL; R20	CAL; R21	CAL; R22	SYM; R23	SYM; R24	SYM; R25	WIN; R26	WIN; R27	WIN; R28	ORA; R29	ORA; R30	ORA; R31	QLD; R32	BAT; R33; 9							42nd	192
2000	MW Motorsport	76	Holden VS Commodore	PHI; R1	PHI; R2	BAR; R3	BAR; R4	BAR; R5	ADE; R6	ADE; R7	EAS; R8	EAS; R9	EAS; R10	HDV; R11	HDV; R12	HDV; R13	CAN; R14	CAN; R15	CAN; R16	QLD; R17	QLD; R18	QLD; R19	WIN; R20	WIN; R21	WIN; R22	ORA; R23	ORA; R24	ORA; R25	CAL; R26	CAL; R27	CAL; R28	QLD; R29	SAN; R30	SAN; R31	SAN; R32	BAT; R33; 24							NC	0
2001	Imrie Motorsport	14	Holden VX Commodore	PHI; R1	PHI; R2	ADE; R3	ADE; R4	EAS; R5	EAS; R6	HDV; R7	HDV; R8	HDV; R9	CAN; R10	CAN; R11	CAN; R12	BAR; R13	BAR; R14	BAR; R15	CAL; R16	CAL; R17	CAL; R18	ORA; R19	ORA; R20	QLD; R21; 20	WIN; R22	WIN; R23	BAT; R24; Ret	PUK; R25	PUK; R26	PUK; R27	SAN; R28	SAN; R29	SAN; R30										70th	104
2002	Briggs Motorsport	600	Ford AU Falcon	ADE; R1	ADE; R2	PHI; R3	PHI; R4	EAS; R5	EAS; R6	EAS; R7	HDV; R8	HDV; R9	HDV; R10	CAN; R11	CAN; R12	CAN; R13	BAR; R14	BAR; R15	BAR; R16	ORA; R17	ORA; R18	WIN; R19; 29	WIN; R20; 27	QLD; R21; 19	BAT; R22; 17	SUR; R23	SUR; R24	PUK; R25	PUK; R26	PUK; R27	SAN; R28	SAN; R29											48th	70
2003	Robert Smith Racing	13	Holden VX Commodore	ADE; R1	ADE; R1	PHI; R3	EAS; R4	WIN; R5	BAR; R6	BAR; R7	BAR; R8	HDV; R9	HDV; R10	HDV; R11	QLD; R12	ORA; R13	SAN; R14; 21	BAT; R15; 21	SUR; R16	SUR; R17	PUK; R18	PUK; R19	PUK; R20	EAS; R21	EAS; R22																		60th	112
2004	K Mart Racing	15	Holden VY Commodore	ADE; R1	ADE; R2	EAS; R3	PUK; R4	PUK; R5	PUK; R6	HDV; R7	HDV; R8	HDV; R9	BAR; R10	BAR; R11	BAR; R12	QLD; R13	WIN; R14	ORA; R15	<>ORA; R16	SAN; R17; Ret	BAT; R18; 8	SUR; R19	SUR; R20	SYM; R21	SYM; R22	SYM; R23	EAS; R24	EAS; R25	EAS; R26														48th	164
2005	Britek Motorsport	25	Ford BA Falcon	ADE; R1; 25	ADE; R2; 13	PUK; R3	PUK; R4	PUK; R5	BAR; R6	BAR; R7	BAR; R8	EAS; R9; 19	EAS; R10; 22	SHA; R11	SHA; R12	SHA; R13	HDV; R14; 20	HDV; R15; 19	HDV; R16; 21	QLD; R17; 24	ORA; R18; 27	ORA; R19; 26	SAN; R20; 23	BAT; R21; Ret	SUR; R22	SUR; R23	SUR; R24	SYM; R25	SYM; R26	SYM; R27	PHI; R28; 21	PHI; R29; Ret	PHI; R30; 22										32nd	480
2006	Rod Nash Racing	55	Holden VZ Commodore	ADE; R1; Ret	ADE; R2; DNS	PUK; R3; 25	PUK; R4; 23	PUK; R5; 22	BAR; R6; 17	BAR; R7; 15	BAR; R8; 13	WIN; R9; 13	WIN; R10; 7	WIN; R11; 11	HDV; R12; 17	HDV; R13; 24	HDV; R14; 18	QLD; R15; 24	QLD; R16; 25	QLD; R17; 26	ORA; R18; 28	**ORA**; **R19**; **Ret**	ORA; R20; 12	SAN; R21; 12	BAT; R22; 7	SUR; R23; 27	SUR; R24; 24	SUR; R25; 15	SYM; R26; 21	SYM; R27; 19	SYM; R28; Ret	BHR; R29; 17	BHR; R30; 25	BHR; R31; 13	PHI; R32; 11	PHI; R33; 29	PHI; R34; 15						22nd	1782
2007	Rod Nash Racing	55	Holden VZ Commodore	ADE; R1; 16	ADE; R2; Ret	BAR; R3; 12	BAR; R4; Ret	BAR; R5; 24	PUK; R6; 19	PUK; R7; 19	PUK; R8; 21	WIN; R9; 13	WIN; R10; 7	WIN; R11; 11	EAS; R12; 27	EAS; R13; Ret	EAS; R14; Ret	HID; R15; 13	HID; R16; 12	HID; R17; 19	QLD; R18; 18	QLD; R19; Ret	QLD; R20; Ret	ORA; R21; Ret	ORA; R22; 23	ORA; R23; 8	SAN; R24; 11	BAT; R25; 6	SUR; R26; 15	SUR; R27; 21	SUR; R28; Ret	BHR; R29; Ret	BHR; R30; 27	BHR; R31; 19	SYM; R32; 15	SYM; R33; 25	SYM; R34; Ret	PHI; R35; 18	PHI; R36; 21	PHI; R37; Ret			19th	103
2008	Dick Johnson Racing	17	Ford BF Falcon	ADE; R1	ADE; R2	EAS; R3; PO	EAS; R4; PO	EAS; R5; PO	HAM; R6	HAM; R7	HAM; R8	BAR; R9	BAR; R10	BAR; R11	SAN; R12; PO	SAN; R13; PO	SAN; R14; PO	HDV; R15	HDV; R16	HDV; R17	QLD; R18	QLD; R19	QLD; R20	WIN; R21	WIN; R22	WIN; R23	PHI; R24; 22	BAT; R25; 11															32nd	362
2008	Team Kiwi Racing	021	Ford BF Falcon																										SUR; R26; 23	SUR; R27; 21	SUR; R28; 15	BHR; R29	BHR; R30	BHR; R31	SYM; R32	SYM; R33	SYM; R34	ORA; R35	ORA; R36	ORA; R37			32nd	362
2009	Walkinshaw Racing	10	Holden VE Commodore	ADE; R1	ADE; R2	HAM; R3	HAM; R4	WIN; R5	WIN; R6	SYM; R7	SYM; R8	HDV; R9	HDV; R10	TOW; R11	TOW; R12	SAN; R13	SAN; R14	QLD; R15	QLD; R16	PHI; Q 9	PHI; R17; 12	BAT; R18; 16	SUR; R19	SUR; R20	SUR; R21	SUR; R22	PHI; R23	PHI; R24	BAR; R25	BAR; R26	SYD; R27	SYD; R28											39th	247
2010	Triple Eight Race Engineering	1	Holden VE Commodore	YMC; R1	YMC; R2	BHR; R3	BHR; R4	ADE; R5	ADE; R6	HAM; R7	HAM; R8	QLD; R9	QLD; R10	WIN; R11	WIN; R12	HDV; R13	HDV; R14	TOW; R15	TOW; R16	**PHI**; **QR**; **1**	**PHI**; **R17**; **29**	BAT; R18; 2	SUR; R19; 6	SUR; R20; 1	SYM; R21	SYM; R22	SAN; R23	SAN; R24	SYD; R25	SYD; R26													31st	623
2011	Paul Morris Motorsport	49	Holden VE Commodore	YMC; R1; 14	YMC; R2; 13	ADE; R3; Ret	ADE; R4; DNS	HAM; R5; 20	HAM; R6; 5	BAR; R7; 17	BAR; R8; Ret	BAR; R9; DNS	WIN; R10; 23	WIN; R11; 10	HID; R12; 10	HID; R13; 14	TOW; R14; 8	TOW; R15; 14	QLD; R16; 5	QLD; R17; 5	QLD; R18; 27	PHI; QR; 15	PHI; R19; 15	BAT; R20; 11	SUR; R21; 18	SUR; R22; 7	SYM; R23; 17	SYM; R24; 23	SAN; R25; 10	SAN; R26; 10	SYD; R27; Ret	SYD; R28; 15											17th	1561
2012	Paul Morris Motorsport	49	Ford FG Falcon	ADE; R1; 19	ADE; R2; 14	SYM; R3; 13	SYM; R4; 12	HAM; R5; 6	HAM; R6; Ret	BAR; R7; Ret	BAR; R8; 27	BAR; R9; 16	PHI; R10; 10	PHI; R11; 21	HID; R12; 14	HID; R13; 22	TOW; R14; 7	TOW; R15; 11	QLD; R16; 16	QLD; R17; 10	SMP; R18; 20	SMP; R19; 22	SAN; QR; 22	SAN; R20; 25	BAT; R21; Ret	SUR; R22; Ret	SUR; R23; 18	YMC; R24; 23	YMC; R25; 20	YMC; R26; 20	WIN; R27; 15	WIN; R28; 20	SYD; R29; 13	SYD; R30; 8									20th	1393
2013	Ford Performance Racing	6	Ford FG Falcon	ADE; R1	ADE; R2	SYM; R3	SYM; R4	SYM; R5	PUK; R6	PUK; R7	PUK; R8	PUK; R9	BAR; R10	BAR; R11	BAR; R12	COA; R13	COA; R14	COA; R15	COA; R16	HID; R17	HID; R18	HID; R19	TOW; R20	TOW; R21	QLD; R22	QLD; R23	QLD; R24	WIN; R25	WIN; R26	WIN; R27	SAN; QR; 1	**SAN**; **R28**; **3**	BAT; R29; 7	SUR; R30; 6	SUR; R31; 9	PHI; R32	PHI; R33	PHI; R34	SYD; R35	SYD; R36			32nd	636
2014	Ford Performance Racing	5	Ford FG Falcon	ADE; R1	ADE; R2	ADE; R3	SYM; R4	SYM; R5	SYM; R6	WIN; R7	WIN; R8	WIN; R9	PUK; R10	PUK; R11	PUK; R12	PUK; R13	BAR; R14	BAR; R15	BAR; R16	HID; R17	HID; R18	HID; R19	TOW; R20	TOW; R21	TOW; R22	QLD; R23	QLD; R24	QLD; R25	SMP; R26	SMP; R27	SMP; R28	SAN; QR; 3	SAN; R29; 10	BAT; R30; 6	SUR; R31; 4	SUR; R32; 13	PHI; R33	PHI; R34	PHI; R35	SYD; R36	SYD; R37	SYD; R38	29th	546
2015	Prodrive Racing Australia	5	Ford FG X Falcon	ADE; R1	ADE; R2	ADE; R3	SYM; R4	SYM; R5	SYM; R6	BAR; R7	BAR; R8	BAR; R9	WIN; R10	WIN; R11	WIN; R12	HID; R13	HID; R14	HID; R15	TOW; R16	TOW; R17	QLD; R18	QLD; R19	QLD; R20	SMP; R21	SMP; R22	SMP; R23	SAN; QR; 2	SAN; R24; 1	BAT; R25; 2	SUR; R26; 23	SUR; R27; 11	PUK; R28	PUK; R29	PUK; R30	PHI; R31	PHI; R32	PHI; R33						29th	706
2015	Prodrive Racing Australia	6	Ford FG X Falcon																																			SYD; R34; 20	SYD; R35; Ret	SYD; R36; Ret			29th	706
2016	Rod Nash Racing	55	Ford FG X Falcon	ADE; R1	ADE; R2	ADE; R3	SYM; R4	SYM; R5	PHI; R6	PHI; R7	BAR; R8	BAR; R9	WIN; R10	WIN; R11	HID; R12	HID; R13	TOW; R14	TOW; R15	QLD; R16	QLD; R17	SMP; R18	SMP; R19	**SAN**; **Q** **2**	SAN; R20; 5	BAT; R21; 19	SUR; R22; 9	SUR; R23; 6	PUK; R24	PUK; R25	PUK; R26	PUK; R27	SYD; R28	SYD; R29										32nd	504
2017	Rod Nash Racing	55	Ford FG X Falcon	ADE; R1	ADE; R2	SYM; R3	SYM; R4	PHI; R5	PHI; R6	BAR; R7	BAR; R8	WIN; R9	WIN; R10	HID; R11	HID; R12	TOW; R13	TOW; R14	QLD; R15	QLD; R16	SMP; R17	SMP; R18	SAN; R19; 3	BAT; R20; 10	**SUR**; **R21**; **1**	SUR; R22; 7	PUK; R23	PUK; R24	NEW; R25	NEW; R26														25th	660
2018	Tickford Racing	56	Ford FG X Falcon	ADE; R1	ADE; R2	MEL; R3	MEL; R4	MEL; R5	MEL; R6	SYM; R7	SYM; R8	PHI; R9	PHI; R10	BAR; R11	BAR; R12	WIN; R13; PO	WIN; R14; PO	HID; R15; PO	HID; R16; PO	TOW; R17	TOW; R18	QLD; R19; PO	QLD; R20; PO	SMP; R21	BEN; R22	BEN; R23	SAN; QR; 26	SAN; R24; 20	BAT; R25; 22	SUR; R26; Ret	SUR; R27; C	PUK; R28	PUK; R29	NEW; R30	NEW; R31								51st	168
2020	Team Sydney by Tekno	22	Holden ZB Commodore	ADE; R1	ADE; R2	MEL; R3	MEL; R4	MEL; R5	MEL; R6	SMP1; R7	SMP1; R8	SMP1; R9	SMP2; R10	SMP2; R11	SMP2; R12	HID1; R13	HID1; R14	HID1; R15	HID2; R16	HID2; R17	HID2; R18	TOW1; R19	TOW1; R20	TOW1; R21	TOW2; R22	TOW2; R23	TOW2; R24	BEN1; R25	BEN1; R26	BEN1; R27	BEN2; R28	BEN2; R29	BEN2; R30	BAT; R31; 16									41st	114

=== Bathurst 1000 results ===
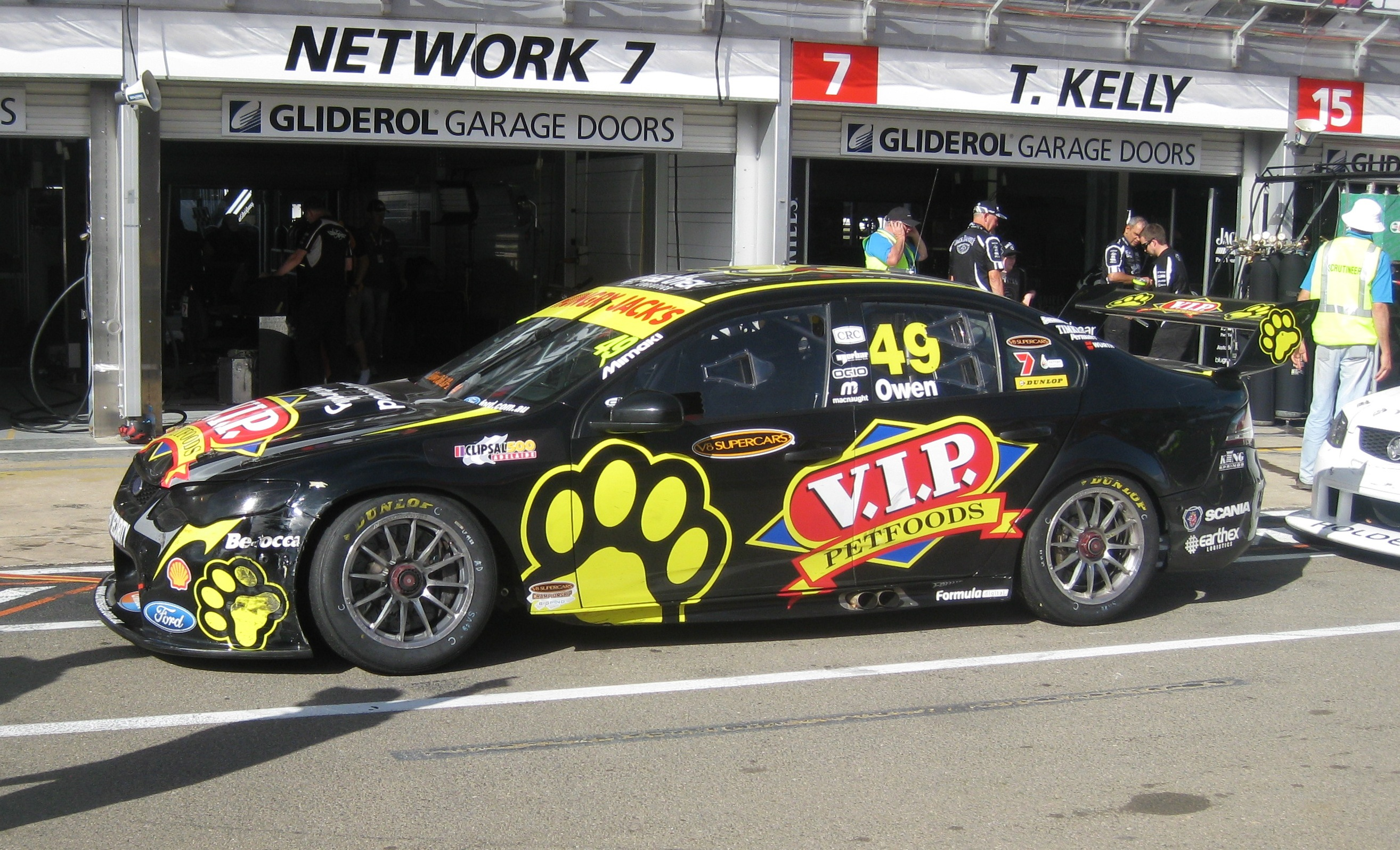
The Ford FG Falcon of Steve Owen at the 2012 Clipsal 500 Adelaide

Year	Car#	Team	Car	Co-driver	Position	Laps
1999	35	Garry Rogers Motorsport	Holden Commodore VT	(Australia) Greg Ritter	9th	160
2000	76	MW Motorsport	Holden Commodore VS	(Australia) Matthew White	24th	143
2001	14	Imrie Motorsport	Holden Commodore VX	(Australia) James Brock	DNF	12
2002	600	Briggs Motor Sport	Ford Falcon AU	(Australia) Dale Brede	17th	158
2003	13	Robert Smith Racing	Holden Commodore VX	(Australia) Phillip Scifleet	21st	141
2004	51	John Kelly Racing	Holden Commodore VY	(Australia) Tim Leahey	8th	160
2005	25	Britek Motorsport	Ford Falcon BA	(Australia) Matthew White	DNF	136
2006	55	Rod Nash Racing	Holden Commodore VZ	(Australia) Tony Longhurst	7th	161
2007	55	Rod Nash Racing	Holden Commodore VZ	(Australia) Tony D'Alberto	6th	161
2008	17	Dick Johnson Racing	Ford Falcon BF	(Australia) Warren Luff	11th	161
2009	10	Walkinshaw Racing	Holden Commodore VE	(Australia) Shane Price	16th	160
2010	1	Triple Eight Race Engineering	Holden Commodore VE	(Australia) Jamie Whincup	**2nd**	161
2011	49	Paul Morris Motorsport	Holden Commodore VE	(Australia) Paul Morris	11th	161
2012	49	Paul Morris Motorsport	Ford Falcon FG	(Australia) Paul Morris	DNF	53
2013	6	Ford Performance Racing	Ford Falcon FG	(Australia) Will Davison	7th	161
2014	5	Ford Performance Racing	Ford Falcon FG	(Australia) Mark Winterbottom	6th	161
2015	5	Prodrive Racing Australia	Ford Falcon FG X	(Australia) Mark Winterbottom	**2nd**	161
2016	55	Rod Nash Racing	Ford Falcon FG X	(Australia) Chaz Mostert	19th	147
2017	55	Rod Nash Racing	Ford Falcon FG X	(Australia) Chaz Mostert	10th	161
2018	56	Tickford Racing	Ford Falcon FG X	(New Zealand) Richie Stanaway	22nd	152
2020	22	Tekno Autosports	Holden Commodore ZB	(New Zealand) Chris Pither	16th	159

Sporting positions
Preceded by Tony D'Alberto	Winner of the Fujitsu V8 Supercars Series; 2008	Succeeded by Jonathon Webb
Preceded by Jonathon Webb	Winner of the Fujitsu V8 Supercars Series; 2010	Succeeded by Andrew Thompson
Preceded by Shane van Gisbergen; Alexandre Prémat	Winner of the Pirtek Enduro Cup; 2017 (with Chaz Mostert)	Succeeded by Craig Lowndes; Steven Richards
