= 2014 Bathurst 1000 =

Motor race in Australia

2014 Supercheap Auto Bathurst 1000

Seasons
- ← 2013 2015 →

(New South Wales) 2014 Supercheap Auto Bathurst 1000
Event Information
- Round 11 of 14 in the 2014 International V8 Supercars Championship
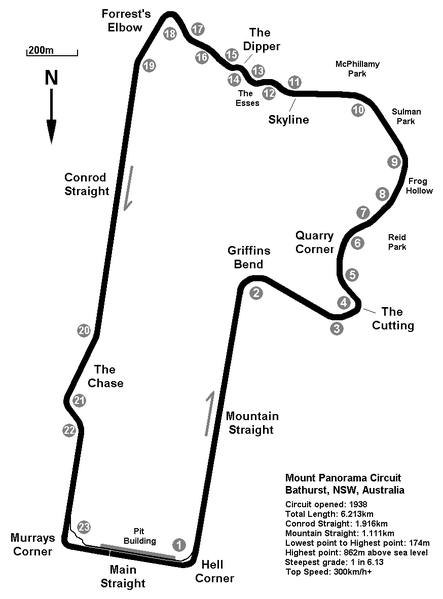
- Date: 9–12 October 2014
- Location: Bathurst, New South Wales
- Venue: Mount Panorama Circuit
- Weather: Fine

Results
Race 1
Distance	161 laps	1000 km
Pole position	(New Zealand) Shane van Gisbergen; Tekno Autosports	2:06.3267
Winner	(Australia) Chaz Mostert; Paul Morris; Ford Performance Racing	7:58:53.2052

The 2014 Supercheap Auto Bathurst 1000 was an Australian touring car race for V8 Supercars, the thirtieth race of the 2014 International V8 Supercars Championship, held on 12 October 2014 at the Mount Panorama Circuit on the outskirts of Bathurst, New South Wales.

The race was won by the Ford Performance Racing driver pairing of Chaz Mostert and Paul Morris, ahead of Nissan Motorsport's James Moffat and Taz Douglas, and the James Rosenberg Racing pair Nick Percat and Oliver Gavin. 2014 marked the longest running in the race's history, just shy of eight hours, and the first time the race has been won by a combination that started last. This race is considered by critics and fans to be one of the best in the history of the event and regarded by some to be the greatest motor race of all time, with weird and unprecedented events, as well as Mostert's last lap pass on series champion Jamie Whincup - who ran out of fuel when entering Conrod Straight - adding to the excitement of the event.

== Background ==
The 2014 race was the eighteenth running of the Australian 1000 race, which was first held after the organisational split between the Australian Racing Drivers Club and V8 Supercars Australia that saw two "Bathurst 1000" races contested in both 1997 and 1998. The 2014 race was also the 57th race for which the lineage can be traced back to the 1960 Armstrong 500 – held at Phillip Island – and the 54th to be held at Mount Panorama.

Volvo made its first appearance in a major endurance race at Bathurst since the factory supported Volvo Dealer Racing finished second and third in the 1999 Bob Jane T-Marts 500 with a pair of Volvo S40s. Garry Rogers Motorsport ran two factory-supported Volvo S60s under the banner of Volvo Polestar Racing.

In addition to the twenty five regular championship entries, two wildcard entries were accepted for the 2014 race. Of the two, the Dragon Motor Racing entry subsequently withdrew, leaving only the Ford FG Falcon entered by Super Black Racing. The team featured much New Zealand symbology, similar to Team Kiwi Racing, although the only connection was some team personnel, notably drivers Andre Heimgartner and Ant Pedersen who had both previously driven with Team Kiwi Racing in junior categories. Prior to 2020, the 26-car field equalled the 1961 edition as the smallest entry list in Bathurst 1000 history.

Mark Winterbottom and Steven Richards were the defending race winners, but were not racing together in 2014 as Winterbottom was paired with Steve Owen at Ford Performance Racing, whilst Richards teamed up with Craig Lowndes at Triple Eight Race Engineering.

=== Entry list ===
No.	Drivers	Team (Sponsor)	Car	No.	Drivers	Team (Sponsor)	Car
1	(Australia) Jamie Whincup (Australia) Paul Dumbrell	Triple Eight Race Engineering (Red Bull)	Holden Commodore VF	18	(Australia) Jack Perkins (Australia) Cam Waters	Charlie Schwerkolt Racing (Jeld-Wen)	Ford Falcon FG
2	(Australia) Garth Tander (Australia) Warren Luff	Holden Racing Team (Holden, SP Tools)	Holden Commodore VF	21	(Australia) Dale Wood (New Zealand) Chris Pither	Britek Motorsport (ADVAM, GB Galvanising)	Holden Commodore VF
4	(Australia) Lee Holdsworth (New Zealand) Craig Baird	Erebus Motorsport (Erebus Motorsport)	Mercedes-Benz E63 AMG	22	(Australia) James Courtney (New Zealand) Greg Murphy	Holden Racing Team (Holden, SP Tools)	Holden Commodore VF
5	(Australia) Mark Winterbottom (Australia) Steve Owen	Ford Performance Racing (Pepsi Max)	Ford Falcon FG	23	(Australia) Russell Ingall (Australia) Tim Blanchard	Lucas Dumbrell Motorsport (OPS Gateway)	Holden Commodore VF
6	(Australia) Chaz Mostert (Australia) Paul Morris	Ford Performance Racing (Pepsi Max)	Ford Falcon FG	33	(New Zealand) Scott McLaughlin (France) Alexandre Prémat	Garry Rogers Motorsport (Valvoline)	Volvo S60
7	(Australia) Todd Kelly (United Kingdom) Alex Buncombe	Nissan Motorsport (Jack Daniel's)	Nissan Altima L33	34	(Sweden) Robert Dahlgren (Australia) Greg Ritter	Garry Rogers Motorsport (Valvoline)	Volvo S60
8	(Australia) Jason Bright (Australia) Andrew Jones	Brad Jones Racing (BOC Gas and Gear)	Holden Commodore VF	36	(Australia) Michael Caruso (Australia) Dean Fiore	Nissan Motorsport (Norton AntiVirus)	Nissan Altima L33
9	(Australia) Will Davison (Australia) Alex Davison	Erebus Motorsport (Beko)	Mercedes-Benz E63 AMG	55	(Australia) David Reynolds (Australia) Dean Canto	Rod Nash Racing (The Bottle-O)	Ford Falcon FG
10	(Australia) Tim Slade (Australia) Tony D'Alberto	Walkinshaw Racing (Supercheap Auto)	Holden Commodore VF	97	(New Zealand) Shane van Gisbergen (Australia) Jonathon Webb	Tekno Autosports (VIP Petfoods)	Holden Commodore VF
14	(New Zealand) Fabian Coulthard (Australia) Luke Youlden	Brad Jones Racing (Lockwood)	Holden Commodore VF	111	(New Zealand) Andre Heimgartner (New Zealand) Ant Pedersen	Super Black Racing (Super Black Racing)	Ford Falcon FG
15	(Australia) Rick Kelly (Australia) David Russell	Nissan Motorsport (Jack Daniel's)	Nissan Altima L33	222	(Australia) Nick Percat (United Kingdom) Oliver Gavin	James Rosenberg Racing (Heavy Haulage Australia)	Holden Commodore VF
16	(Australia) Scott Pye (Australia) Ashley Walsh	Dick Johnson Racing (Wilson Security)	Ford Falcon FG	360	(Australia) James Moffat (Australia) Taz Douglas	Nissan Motorsport (Norton AntiVirus)	Nissan Altima L33
17	(Australia) David Wall (Australia) Steven Johnson	Dick Johnson Racing (Wilson Security)	Ford Falcon FG	888	(Australia) Craig Lowndes (New Zealand) Steven Richards	Triple Eight Race Engineering (Red Bull)	Holden Commodore VF

Entries with a grey background were wildcard entries which did not compete in the full championship season.

== Report ==
=== Free Practice ===
The first free practice session took place on the Thursday morning prior to the race with a duration of fifty minutes. The session was open to both championship drivers and co-drivers, with Chaz Mostert setting the fastest time ahead of James Moffat and Garth Tander. David Wall suffered a tyre failure on Conrod Straight, causing him to make contact with the wall and damaging the front and rear of the car. Cam Waters hit the wall at the Cutting, damaging the rear of his car. Both cars would miss the second free practice session, which was only for co-drivers. Four-time Bathurst winner Greg Murphy topped the session in his Holden Racing Team Commodore over the defending Bathurst winner Steven Richards and Brad Jones Racing's Luke Youlden. The third practice session took place mid-afternoon and was littered with red flags, first for Robert Dahlgren and then Tander, who both had accidents at the Dipper. The session was restarted five minutes from the end and the top three cars all broke the practice lap record (2:06.8012, set by Craig Lowndes in 2010) in that time: David Reynolds set a 2:06.3714, Mark Winterbottom a 2:06.4813 and Fabian Coulthard a 2:06.5463.

Ford Performance Racing topped both free practice sessions on Friday, with Steve Owen going fastest in the co-driver only session ahead of Youlden and Alexandre Prémat. After repairing Wall's car on Thursday, Dick Johnson Racing had more work to do after Ashley Walsh crashed the team's other car in an incident similar to that of Waters the day before. In the fifth free practice session, Winterbottom became the first driver to set a lap time under 2:06 with a time of 2:05.9011, ahead of Scott McLaughlin and Jamie Whincup, who both set a time of 2:06.1.

Summary

Session	Time	No.	Driver	Team	Car	Fastest lap	Weather
Thursday
Practice 1	11:05	6	Chaz Mostert	Ford Performance Racing	Ford FG Falcon	2:08.0736	Dry, sunny
Practice 2	13:15	22	Greg Murphy	Holden Racing Team	Holden VF Commodore	2:08.5365	Dry, sunny
Practice 3	15:10	55	David Reynolds	Rod Nash Racing	Ford FG Falcon	2:06.3714	Dry, sunny
Friday
Practice 4	09:30	5	Steve Owen	Ford Performance Racing	Ford FG Falcon	2:06.7774	Dry, sunny
Practice 5	13:10	5	Mark Winterbottom	Ford Performance Racing	Ford FG Falcon	2:05.9011	Dry, sunny
Saturday
Practice 6	10:20	5	Mark Winterbottom	Ford Performance Racing	Ford FG Falcon	2:06.0635	Dry, sunny

=== Race ===
Whincup made significant ground in the first stint, starting 24th and racing to a net 4th place by his first pit-stop on lap 22, after a tactical play by Triple 8 engineer Mark Dutton to have him start the race against the co-drivers, giving the car to his co-driver Dumbrell with a lap long lead. The first safety car was deployed a handful of laps later after Luke Youlden beached his car in the gravel at the Chase.

Lap 45, Youlden hit a kangaroo that jumped on the track, hitting the driver's side door that left the car damaged, to the point that the door could not be opened. Youlden's incident with the kangaroo bought out the safety car as a precaution, checking that there were not any more kangaroos near the track, whilst also removing the dead kangaroo from the track. Unfortunately for Brad Jones Racing it was not the only incident that occurred during the lap, with Dale Wood ignoring the safety car yellow and running into the back of the third BJR car, driven by Jason Bright, ruling both cars out of the race. This left Coulthard/Youlden as the only BJR car still in the race.

After resurfacing the track prior to the race, the road at Griffins Bend began to open up, with three crashes being caused. Race direction ordered a red flag to fix the track surface, making it safe to drive through the corner. It was the first time in the history of the race that a red flag did not end the race, as not enough laps had been run to determine a winner, with teams joking about supplying 'half-time' oranges to the teams. Whincup revealed in 2018 he fell asleep in the Red Bull motorhome during the stoppage, being asleep for an hour and a half before a team member woke him up to start again. Controversy was ridden throughout the stoppage, as teams who had damage to their cars were allowed to fix and repair, despite it being in the rules, many of the leading teams called it an unfair advantage, which would affect the race's final result.

Driving the same car that was damaged in the Sandown 500 two weeks prior, Holdsworth was again totalled by circumstances out of his control, as Ingall tried to pass Todd Kelly he unintentionally tagged Holdsworth with the car rolling onto its roof.

By 4pm, the safety car nearly had to be deployed when a kid's rugby league football somehow made its way onto Conrod Straight, luckily an official was able to run onto the track and retrieve the ball while there were no cars near the area of the track.

Within the last hour, Van Gisbergen had built a large lead over the rest of the field, going in for one last pit stop before finishing the end of the race, when the car turned off and would not start up in the pits.

By the last hour of the race, four cars from two different teams emerged as the leading pack, with Whincup and Lowndes from Red Bull Racing and Winterbottom and Mostert from Ford Performance Racing. After Lowndes was given a drive-through penalty for spinning Winterbottom, it left Whincup and Mostert at the lead of the race, with Whincup dangerously low on fuel and Mostert behind him by over two seconds. Despite his team warning him to conserve fuel, Whincup chose to ignore team orders, continuing to push on until two laps to go when it became apparent that he was not going to make it, while Mostert was still two seconds behind by the middle of the lap 160 was told by his team to stop conserving and catch Whincup, lapping two seconds quicker as a result. When passing Griffens Bend on the final lap, Mostert squeezed Whincup's lead to 0.289 seconds. Mostert attempted to pass Whincup at Skyline, however Whincup took the racing line leading to the two nearly tagging each other, with Mostert pulling back at the Dipper waiting for another attempt at Forrests Elbow. Mostert tricked Whincup, performing a criss-cross move that allowed him to pass on the inside racing line, blistering ahead on Conrod Straight as Whincup ran out of fuel at the same time as Mostert's pass. During this time Moffat, then in third place was able to pass Whincup at The Chase, while Mostert drove to an unprecedented victory, only leading one lap during the race and executing the first last lap pass in the events history. To add to his disappointment, Whincup was also passed by Percat after The Chase and Will Davison on the front straight, finishing fifth as a result.

In an unprecedented moment, the first and second placed cars had both crashed during the race, all ironically at Griffins Bend, with the Mostert/Morris car came as a result of the track breakup, while the Moffat/Douglas car crashed once because of the track breakup and once in a collision with Jack Perkins. This made the Percat/Gavin car the rare honour of being the only podium finishing car that did not have any damage by race end.

== Classification ==
=== Qualifying ===
Pos.	No.	Drivers	Team	Car	Lap time	Difference	Grid
1	14	(New Zealand) Fabian Coulthard (Australia) Luke Youlden	Brad Jones Racing	Holden VF Commodore	2:05.6080		Top; 10
2	97	(New Zealand) Shane van Gisbergen (Australia) Jonathon Webb	Tekno Autosports	Holden VF Commodore	2:05.7011	+0.0931	Top; 10
3	21	(Australia) Dale Wood (New Zealand) Chris Pither	Britek Motorsport	Holden VF Commodore	2:06.2391	+0.6311	Top; 10
4	5	(Australia) Mark Winterbottom (Australia) Steve Owen	Ford Performance Racing	Ford FG Falcon	2:06.2556	+0.6476	Top; 10
5	33	(New Zealand) Scott McLaughlin (France) Alexandre Prémat	Garry Rogers Motorsport	Volvo S60	2:06.3358	+0.7278	Top; 10
6	8	(Australia) Jason Bright (Australia) Andrew Jones	Brad Jones Racing	Holden VF Commodore	2:06.4769	+0.8689	Top; 10
7	18	(Australia) Jack Perkins (Australia) Cam Waters	Charlie Schwerkolt Racing	Ford FG Falcon	2:06.5347	+0.9267	Top; 10
8	360	(Australia) James Moffat (Australia) Taz Douglas	Nissan Motorsport	Nissan Altima	2:06.6088	+1.0008	Top; 10
9	2	(Australia) Garth Tander (Australia) Warren Luff	Holden Racing Team	Holden VF Commodore	2:06.6195	+1.0115	N/A^{1}
10	888	(Australia) Craig Lowndes (New Zealand) Steven Richards	Triple Eight Race Engineering	Holden VF Commodore	2:06.7069	+1.0989	Top; 10
11	22	(Australia) James Courtney (New Zealand) Greg Murphy	Holden Racing Team	Holden VF Commodore	2:06.7150	+1.1070	10
12	222	(Australia) Nick Percat (United Kingdom) Oliver Gavin	James Rosenberg Racing	Holden VF Commodore	2:06.7451	+1.1371	11
13	7	(Australia) Todd Kelly (United Kingdom) Alex Buncombe	Nissan Motorsport	Nissan Altima	2:06.8090	+1.2010	12
14	36	(Australia) Michael Caruso (Australia) Dean Fiore	Nissan Motorsport	Nissan Altima	2:06.8898	+1.2818	13
15	15	(Australia) Rick Kelly (Australia) David Russell	Nissan Motorsport	Nissan Altima	2:06.8902	+1.2822	14
16	16	(Australia) Scott Pye (Australia) Ashley Walsh	Dick Johnson Racing	Ford FG Falcon	2:07.2720	+1.6640	15
17	9	(Australia) Will Davison (Australia) Alex Davison	Erebus Motorsport	Mercedes-Benz E63 AMG	2:07.4989	+1.8909	16
18	4	(Australia) Lee Holdsworth (New Zealand) Craig Baird	Erebus Motorsport	Mercedes-Benz E63 AMG	2:07.5463	+1.9383	17
19	23	(Australia) Russell Ingall (Australia) Tim Blanchard	Lucas Dumbrell Motorsport	Holden VF Commodore	2:07.5760	+1.9680	18
20	10	(Australia) Tim Slade (Australia) Tony D'Alberto	Walkinshaw Racing	Holden VF Commodore	2:07.8996	+2.2916	19
21	34	(Sweden) Robert Dahlgren (Australia) Greg Ritter	Garry Rogers Motorsport	Volvo S60	2:08.2603	+2.6523	20
22	17	(Australia) David Wall (Australia) Steven Johnson	Dick Johnson Racing	Ford FG Falcon	2:08.3854	+2.7774	21
23	111	(New Zealand) Ant Pedersen (New Zealand) Andre Heimgartner	Super Black Racing	Ford FG Falcon	2:08.4896	+2.8816	22
24	1	(Australia) Jamie Whincup (Australia) Paul Dumbrell	Triple Eight Race Engineering	Holden VF Commodore	2:19.5136^{2}	+13.9056	23
25	55	(Australia) David Reynolds (Australia) Dean Canto	Rod Nash Racing	Ford FG Falcon	3:48.1345^{2}	+1:42.5265	24
EX^{3}	6	(Australia) Chaz Mostert (Australia) Paul Morris	Ford Performance Racing	Ford FG Falcon	2:06.8385	+1.2305	25

Notes:

- ^1 – The car of Garth Tander and Warren Luff was heavily damaged in a crash in the sixth free practice session, held on Saturday morning, which led to the car being withdrawn from the top ten shootout and the race. As a result, all cars which did not qualify for the top ten shootout were moved up one position on the starting grid.
- ^2 – David Reynolds and Jamie Whincup both crashed and caused a red flag during the qualifying session, which led to their fastest lap times being invalidated.
- ^3 – Chaz Mostert originally qualified fourteenth but was excluded from the session for passing under red flags.

=== Top 10 Shootout ===
Only nine cars took part in the top ten shootout after Garth Tander's car was heavily damaged in a crash in practice on Saturday morning. Eleventh-fastest qualifier James Courtney was originally promoted to take part of in the top ten shootout, but was later prevented from running after a protest from Triple Eight Race Engineering.

Pos.	No.	Driver	Team	Running order	Qualifying time	Qualifying position	Shootout time	Final grid position
1	97	(New Zealand) Shane van Gisbergen	Tekno Autosports	8th	2:05.7011	2nd	2:06.3267	1st
2	5	(Australia) Mark Winterbottom	Ford Performance Racing	6th	2:06.2556	4th	2:06.6389	2nd
3	33	(New Zealand) Scott McLaughlin	Garry Rogers Motorsport	5th	2:06.3358	5th	2:06.7782	3rd
4	8	(Australia) Jason Bright	Brad Jones Racing	4th	2:06.4769	6th	2:07.0431	4th
5	14	(New Zealand) Fabian Coulthard	Brad Jones Racing	9th	2:05.6080	1st	2:07.0568	5th
6	888	(Australia) Craig Lowndes	Triple Eight Race Engineering	1st	2:06.7069	10th	2:07.7304	6th
7	360	(Australia) James Moffat	Nissan Motorsport	2nd	2:06.6088	8th	2:07.7453	7th
8	21	(Australia) Dale Wood	Britek Motorsport	7th	2:06.2391	3rd	2:07.9923	8th
9	18	(Australia) Jack Perkins	Charlie Schwerkolt Racing	3rd	2:06.5347	7th	2:08.2498	9th

=== Starting grid ===
The following table represents the final starting grid for the race on Sunday:

Inside row			Outside row		
1	(New Zealand) Shane van Gisbergen (Australia) Jonathon Webb	97	5	(Australia) Mark Winterbottom (Australia) Steve Owen	2
1	Tekno Autosports (Holden Commodore VF)		Ford Performance Racing (Ford Falcon FG)		2
3	(New Zealand) Scott McLaughlin (France) Alexandre Prémat	33	8	(Australia) Jason Bright (Australia) Andrew Jones	4
3	Garry Rogers Motorsport (Volvo S60)		Brad Jones Racing (Holden Commodore VF)		4
5	(New Zealand) Fabian Coulthard (Australia) Luke Youlden	14	888	(Australia) Craig Lowndes (New Zealand) Steven Richards	6
5	Brad Jones Racing (Holden Commodore VF)		Triple Eight Race Engineering (Holden Commodore VF)		6
7	(Australia) James Moffat (Australia) Taz Douglas	360	21	(Australia) Dale Wood (New Zealand) Chris Pither	8
7	Nissan Motorsport (Nissan Altima L33)		Britek Motorsport (Holden Commodore VF)		8
9	(Australia) Jack Perkins (Australia) Cam Waters	18	22	(Australia) James Courtney (New Zealand) Greg Murphy	10
9	Charlie Schwerkolt Racing (Ford Falcon FG)		Holden Racing Team (Holden Commodore VF)		10
11	(Australia) Nick Percat (United Kingdom) Oliver Gavin	222	7	(Australia) Todd Kelly (United Kingdom) Alex Buncombe	12
11	James Rosenberg Racing (Holden Commodore VF)		Nissan Motorsport (Nissan Altima L33)		12
13	(Australia) Michael Caruso (Australia) Dean Fiore	36	15	(Australia) Rick Kelly (Australia) David Russell	14
13	Nissan Motorsport (Nissan Altima L33)		Nissan Motorsport (Nissan Altima L33)		14
15	(Australia) Scott Pye (Australia) Ashley Walsh	16	9	(Australia) Will Davison (Australia) Alex Davison	16
15	Dick Johnson Racing (Ford Falcon FG)		Erebus Motorsport (Mercedes-Benz E63 AMG)		16
17	(Australia) Lee Holdsworth (New Zealand) Craig Baird	4	23	(Australia) Russell Ingall (Australia) Tim Blanchard	18
17	Erebus Motorsport (Mercedes-Benz E63 AMG)		Lucas Dumbrell Motorsport (Holden Commodore VF)		18
19	(Australia) Tim Slade (Australia) Tony D'Alberto	10	34	(Sweden) Robert Dahlgren (Australia) Greg Ritter	20
19	Walkinshaw Racing (Holden Commodore VF)		Garry Rogers Motorsport (Volvo S60)		20
21	(Australia) David Wall (Australia) Steven Johnson	17	111	(New Zealand) Andre Heimgartner (New Zealand) Ant Pedersen	22
21	Dick Johnson Racing (Ford Falcon FG)		Super Black Racing (Ford Falcon FG)		22
23	(Australia) Jamie Whincup (Australia) Paul Dumbrell	1	55	(Australia) David Reynolds (Australia) Dean Canto	24
23	Triple Eight Race Engineering (Holden Commodore VF)		Rod Nash Racing (Ford Falcon FG)		24
25	(Australia) Chaz Mostert (Australia) Paul Morris	6			
25	Ford Performance Racing (Ford Falcon FG)				

=== Race ===
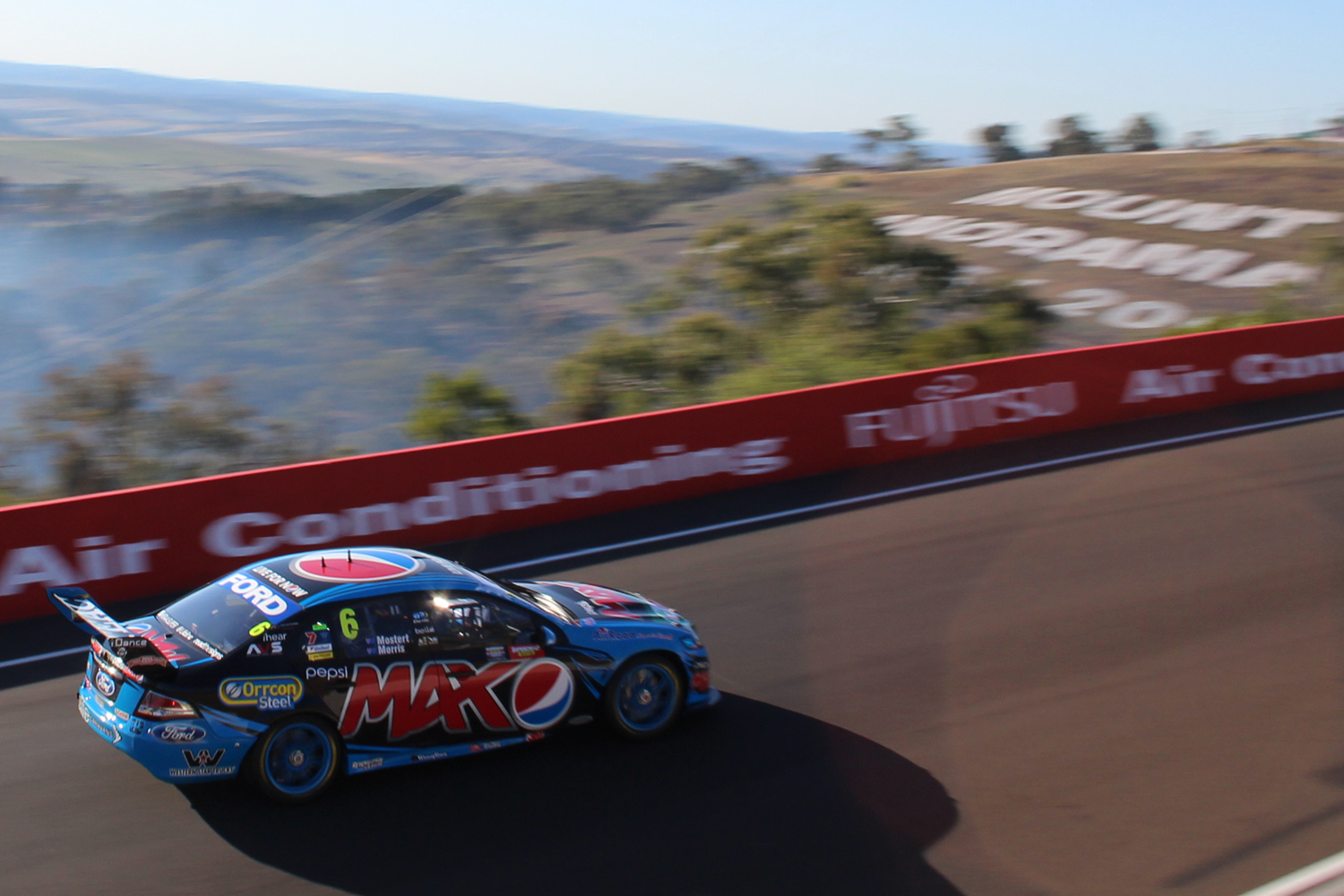
Chaz Mostert and Paul Morris won the race driving a Ford FG Falcon

Pos.	No.	Drivers	Team	Car	Laps	Time/Retired	Grid	Points
1	6	(Australia) Chaz Mostert (Australia) Paul Morris	Ford Performance Racing	Ford Falcon FG	161	7:58:53.2052	25	300
2	360	(Australia) James Moffat (Australia) Taz Douglas	Nissan Motorsport	Nissan Altima L33	161	+4.0936	7	276
3	222	(Australia) Nick Percat (United Kingdom) Oliver Gavin	James Rosenberg Racing	Holden Commodore VF	161	+8.5254	11	258
4	9	(Australia) Will Davison (Australia) Alex Davison	Erebus Motorsport	Mercedes-Benz E63 AMG	161	+10.3839	16	240
5	1	(Australia) Jamie Whincup (Australia) Paul Dumbrell	Triple Eight Race Engineering	Holden Commodore VF	161	+11.8703	23	222
6	5	(Australia) Mark Winterbottom (Australia) Steve Owen	Ford Performance Racing	Ford Falcon FG	161	+16.7435	2	204
7	7	(Australia) Todd Kelly (United Kingdom) Alex Buncombe	Nissan Motorsport	Nissan Altima L33	161	+16.8377	12	192
8	15	(Australia) Rick Kelly (Australia) David Russell	Nissan Motorsport	Nissan Altima L33	161	+28.1043	14	180
9	14	(New Zealand) Fabian Coulthard (Australia) Luke Youlden	Brad Jones Racing	Holden Commodore VF	161	+30.7727	5	168
10	888	(Australia) Craig Lowndes (New Zealand) Steven Richards	Triple Eight Race Engineering	Holden Commodore VF	161	+42.5289	6	156
11	111	(New Zealand) Ant Pedersen (New Zealand) Andre Heimgartner	Super Black Racing	Ford Falcon FG	161	+57.9472	22	144
12	18	(Australia) Jack Perkins (Australia) Cam Waters	Charlie Schwerkolt Racing	Ford Falcon FG	161	+1:36.6616	9	138
13	22	(Australia) James Courtney (New Zealand) Greg Murphy	Holden Racing Team	Holden Commodore VF	160	+1 lap	10	132
14	8	(Australia) Jason Bright (Australia) Andrew Jones	Brad Jones Racing	Holden Commodore VF	158	+3 laps	4	126
15	36	(Australia) Michael Caruso (Australia) Dean Fiore	Nissan Motorsport	Nissan Altima L33	158	+3 laps	13	120
16	97	(New Zealand) Shane van Gisbergen (Australia) Jonathon Webb	Tekno Autosports	Holden Commodore VF	158	+3 laps	1	114
17	33	(New Zealand) Scott McLaughlin (France) Alexandre Prémat	Garry Rogers Motorsport	Volvo S60	150	+11 laps	3	108
Ret	23	(Australia) Russell Ingall (Australia) Tim Blanchard	Lucas Dumbrell Motorsport	Holden Commodore VF	150	Accident	18	
Ret	4	(Australia) Lee Holdsworth (New Zealand) Craig Baird	Erebus Motorsport	Mercedes-Benz E63 AMG	132	Accident	17	
Ret	55	(Australia) David Reynolds (Australia) Dean Canto	Rod Nash Racing	Ford Falcon FG	117	Alternator	24	
Ret	34	(Sweden) Robert Dahlgren (Australia) Greg Ritter	Garry Rogers Motorsport	Volvo S60	114	Accident	20	
Ret	10	(Australia) Tim Slade (Australia) Tony D'Alberto	Walkinshaw Racing	Holden Commodore VF	102	Accident	19	
Ret	16	(Australia) Scott Pye (Australia) Ashley Walsh	Dick Johnson Racing	Ford Falcon FG	70	Accident	15	
Ret	17	(Australia) David Wall (Australia) Steven Johnson	Dick Johnson Racing	Ford Falcon FG	64	Transaxle	21	
Ret	21	(Australia) Dale Wood (New Zealand) Chris Pither	Britek Motorsport	Holden Commodore VF	45	Accident	8	
DNS	2	(Australia) Garth Tander (Australia) Warren Luff	Holden Racing Team	Holden Commodore VF	-	Practice Accident	-	

== Broadcast ==
The race was covered by the Seven Network for the eighth consecutive season. Matthew White departed a commentary role after the Winton round of the series to move back to Network 10, his first absence from the broadcast since its move to Seven in 2007. Following his withdrawal from the race, Garth Tander made sporadic appearances during the race broadcast as a pundit from the Holden Racing Team garage.

Seven Network
Host: Mark Beretta
Booth: Neil Crompton, Aaron Noonan (ad-breaks), Mark Skaife
Pit-lane: Riana Crehan, Mark Larkham
Roving: Edwina Bartholomew
