= Greg Murphy Racing =

Australian V8 Supercar racing team

- Manufacturer: Holden
- Team Principal: Kevin Murphy
- Team Manager: Dean Lillie
- Debut: V8:2009; FV8:2007
- Drivers' Championships: 0
- Round wins: 0
- 2010 position: 0
- 19th (142 pts)

Greg Murphy Racing was a V8 Supercar team that competed in the second-tier Australian V8 Supercar series, the Dunlop V8 Supercar Series. The team have also had wild card entries into the V8 Supercar Championship Series endurance races, specifically the Phillip Island 500 and Bathurst 1000, in 2009 and 2010. The team was merged into Evans Motorsport Group towards the end of 2012. The Greg Murphy Racing name is still used for Holden Commodores entered by the predominantly Ford oriented Evans Motorsport Group team.

== History ==
The history of the team can be traced back to Greg Murphy's forays into Formula Holden racing in Australia. In 1994 the Murphy family established the infrastructure to run a Formula Holden team for Greg Murphy. The team was reformed later and ran as a professional outfit for pay drivers well into the 2000s. As Formula Holden started to run out of momentum the team branched out into Carrera Cup.

The team shared some management personnel with Tasman Motorsport before the Tasman's closure in 2009, so a further move into the Fujitsu V8 Supercar Series was inevitable, beginning with the 2007 season using Tasman Motorsport built VZ Commodores with Dale Wood and Sam Walter the team's first drivers. In 2008 Wood and Walter returned and the team expanded to a third car with James Bergmuller. Wood finished sixth in the series.

For 2009 Bergmuller left the team and Wood moved on to a main series drive with Kelly Racing leaving just Walter to continue to drive the #47 VZ Commodore. The team was one of four Fujitsu Series teams to apply and receive wildcard entries into the 2009 V8 Supercar enduros and utilised a Tasman Motorsport built VE Commodore for Phillip Island and Bathurst with Walter and Taz Douglas sharing the driving duties. the VE Commodore made one appearance before the endurance events, at round 4 at Sandown Walter left the team at the conclusion of the 2009 season.

After the close of Tasman Motorsport, the team acquired all the equipment, including the two VE Commodore racecars, the spare chassis and the workshop in Melbourne. The team's drivers for the 2010 season were Steve Owen and Daniel Jilesen, the team also prepared a VZ Commodore for Geoff Emery, with Emery eventually using one of the VE Commodores for the final rounds. In 2010, the team also ran a car in the V8 Supercars endurance events with Emery and Marcus Zukanovic the drivers, the pair finished 23rd at Phillip Island and 24th at Bathurst. Owen eventually went on to dominate the 2010 Season, with him taking 6 poles, 8 race wins and 4 round wins.

For 2011 the team expanded to four cars, with Tony Bates joining the team full-time alongside Geoff Emery in the #48 Commodore and Daniel Jilesen in a brand new chassis as the #51 Commodore. Bates is the driver the #24 Sportsline Commodore and James Brock joined the team from Townsville onwards to drive the #45 Commodore which was driven in Adelaide by guest driver Jason Richards.

In 2012, the team downsized to three cars with Marcus Zukanovic and former Kelly Racing driver Dale Wood joined the team.

== Drivers ==
=== Supercars drivers ===
All Entries have driven for the team as Wildcard Entries in the Supercars Championship in order of appearance. Drivers who drove for the team on a part-time basis are listed in italics

- (Australia) Sam Walter (2009)
- (Australia) Taz Douglas (2009)
- (Australia) Geoff Emery (2010)
- (Australia) Marcus Zukanovic (2010)

=== Super2 drivers ===
All Entries have driven for the team in the Super2 Series in order of appearance. Drivers who drove for the team on a part-time basis are listed in italics

- (Australia) Dale Wood (2007–2008, 2012)
- (Australia) Sam Walter (2007–2009)
- (Australia) James Bergmuller (2008)
- (New Zealand) Andrew Anderson (2009)
- (Australia) Steve Owen (2010)
- (New Zealand) Daniel Jilesen (2010–2011)
- (Australia) Geoff Emery (2010–2012)
- (Australia) Tony Bates (2011)
- (Australia) Matt Hansen (2011–2012)
- (New Zealand) Jason Richards (2011)
- (Australia) James Brock (2011)
- (New Zealand) Nick Cassidy (2011)
- (Australia) Jim Pollicina (2012–2013)
- (Australia) Marcus Zukanovic (2012)

=== Super3 drivers ===
All Entries have driven for the team in the Super3 Series in order of appearance. Drivers who drove for the team on a part-time basis are listed in italics

- (New Zealand) Sam Walter (2010)
