= Ant Pedersen =

New Zealand racing driver (born 1998)

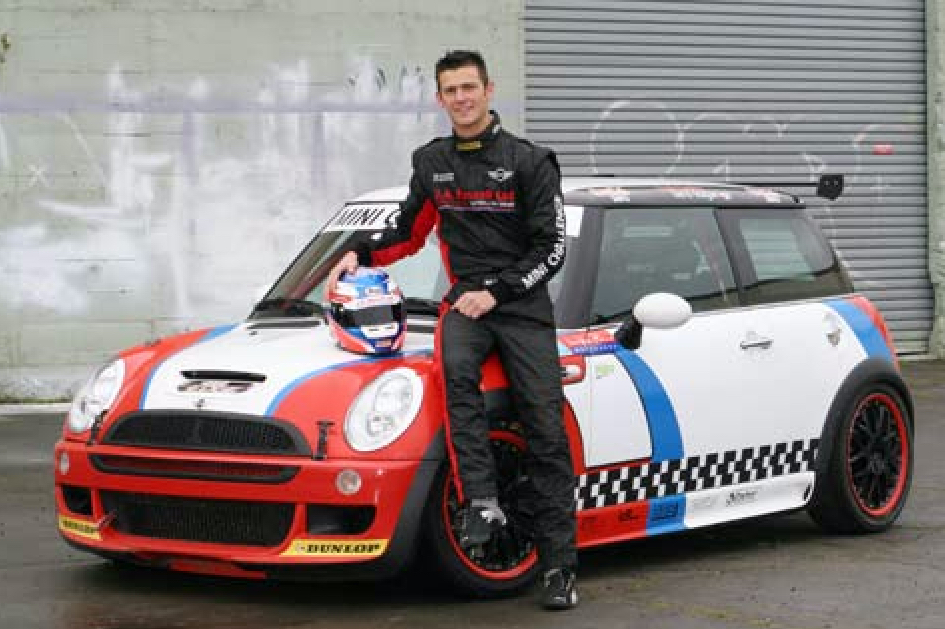
- Pedersen in 2007
- Nationality: New Zealander
- Born: Anthony Arne Pedersen; 5 May 1988 (age 38)

V8 SuperTourers career
- Debut season: 2012
- Current team: International Motorsport
- Car number: 96
- Starts: 14
- Wins: 5
- Poles: 2
- Fastest laps: 0
- Best finish: 2nd in 2013

Previous series
- 2009 2010,14-15 2010,14-15 2012-15 2012: Australian Mini Challenge; Dunlop V8 Supercar Series; International V8 Supercars; V8SuperTourer; Australian Carrera Cup

Championship titles
- 2022 2022: North Island Endurance Series- 1H; North Island Endurance Series- 3H

Anthony Arne Pedersen (born 5 May 1988) is a racing driver from New Zealand.

== Career ==
=== V8 SuperTourers ===
In 2012, Pedersen was given the opportunity to run in the brand-new V8SuperTourer category in New Zealand and on the first ever race weekend, he was able to win the final race for International Motorsport. By the end of the season, Pedersen was able to finish sixth overall. In 2013, Pedersen came out firing managing to win four races, claim two pole positions and 11 podium finishes, which gave him second overall to Kiwi legend, Greg Murphy.

=== V8 Supercars ===
In 2014, Pedersen was selected to race the Super Black Racing wildcard entry at the 2014 Supercheap Auto Bathurst 1000 alongside fellow Kiwi Andre Heimgartner. Pedersen would again partner with Heimgartner for the 2015 endurance events.

== Racing record ==
=== Career summary ===
Season	Series	Team	Races	Wins	Poles	F/Laps	Podiums	Points	Position
2006-07	Mini Challenge New Zealand		?	?	?	?	?	927	4th
2008	Battery Town Porsche GT3 Cup Challenge		18	0	0	2	0	873	3rd
2009	Australian Mini Challenge		3	0	0	0	0	63	29th
2009-10	New Zealand V8's	SCG Racing	3	0	0	0	0	112	25th
2010	Fujitsu V8 Supercar Series	MW Motorsport	8	0	0	0	1	485	17th
2010	V8 Supercar Championship Series	MW Motorsport	3	0	0	0	0	137	56th
2010-11	Porsche GT3 Cup Challenge NZ Championship	International Motorsport	9	0	0	3	0	442	10th
2012	Australian Carrera Cup Championship	Hunter Sports Group	3	0	0	0	0	58	21st
2012	V8SuperTourer	International Motorsport	19	1	0	0	1	2424	6th
2013	V8SuperTourer	International Motorsport	21	4	2	2	11	3531	2nd
2014	V8SuperTourer	International Motorsport	13	0	4	1	5	817	4th
2014	Dunlop V8 Supercar Series	Eggleston Motorsport	13	0	0	0	0	1053	10th
2014	International V8 Supercars Championship	Super Black Racing	1	0	0	0	0	144	50th
2015	V8 Supercars Dunlop Series	Eggleston Motorsport	14	0	0	0	0	855	13th
2015	International V8 Supercars Championship	Super Black Racing	4	0	0	0	0	185	50th
2025	GT World Challenge Australia - Pro-Am	Mach1 Engineering							

=== Complete Bathurst 1000 results ===
Year	Team	Car	Co-driver	Position	Laps
2010	MW Motorsport	Ford Falcon BF	(Australia) Damien Assaillit	26th	153
2014	Super Black Racing	Ford Falcon FG	(New Zealand) Andre Heimgartner	11th	161
2015	Super Black Racing	Ford Falcon FG X	(New Zealand) Andre Heimgartner	DNF	35
