= 2002 Australian Drivers' Championship =

Motor racing competition

Seasons
- ← 2001 2003 →

The 2002 Australian Drivers' Championship was a CAMS sanctioned Australian motor racing title for drivers of Formula Holden racing cars with the 2002 CAMS Gold Star awarded to the winning driver. It was the 46th Australian Drivers' Championship.

The championship was won by Will Power driving a Reynard 94D for Ralt Australia.

== Teams and drivers ==
Entrant	Chassis	No	Drivers	Rounds
Greg Murphy Racing	Reynard 95D	4	(Australia) Peter Hill	2–6
Greg Murphy Racing	Reynard 95D	22	(Australia) Peter Hill	1
Greg Murphy Racing	Reynard 95D	5	(Australia) Tim Leahey	6
Greg Murphy Racing	Reynard 95D	5	(Australia) Peter Hackett	2–3
Greg Murphy Racing	Reynard 95D	66	(Australia) Peter Hackett	1
Greg Murphy Racing	Reynard 97D	6	(Australia) Roger Oakshott	2–6
Ken Smith Motorsport	Reynard 93D	7	(New Zealand) Nelson Hartley	1–3, 5–6
Ralt Australia	Reynard 94D	10	(Australia) Brett Campbell	5–6
Ralt Australia	Reynard 94D	11	(Australia) Will Power	All
Ralt Australia	Reynard 96D	12	(Australia) Mark Noske	1
Ralt Australia	Reynard 96D	12	(Australia) Stewart McColl	2–6
Millar Motors	Reynard 92D	17	(Australia) Mark Ellis	1, 3, 6
National Neon Signs	Reynard 92D	24	(Australia) Terry Clearihan	1
National Neon Signs	Reynard 92D	27	(Australia) Terry Clearihan	3, 5–6
Peters Racing	Reynard 91D	24	(Australia) Ian Peters	2–4
Roger Oakshott Racing	Reynard 97D	28	(Australia) Roger Oakshott	1
CRD Motorsport	Reynard 92D	49	(Australia) Rohan Carrig	All
Hocking Motorsport	Reynard 97D	74	(Japan) Akihiro Asai	All
Hocking Motorsport	Reynard 97D	75	(Singapore) Christian Murchison	All
Hocking Motorsport	Reynard 96D	76	(Australia) Les Crampton	1–2, 4

== Schedule ==
The championship was contested over a six-round series with two races per round:

Rnd		Circuit	State / Territory	Date	Pole position	Fastest lap	Winning driver	Winning team
1	R1	Phillip Island Grand Prix Circuit	Phillip Island, Victoria	13–15 April	(Australia) Mark Noske	(Australia) Will Power	(Australia) Will Power	Ralt Australia
1	R2	Phillip Island Grand Prix Circuit	Phillip Island, Victoria	13–15 April		(Australia) Will Power	(Australia) Will Power	Ralt Australia
2	R1	Eastern Creek International Raceway	Eastern Creek, New South Wales	26–28 April	(Australia) Peter Hackett	(Australia) Will Power	(Australia) Stewart McColl	Ralt Australia
2	R2	Eastern Creek International Raceway	Eastern Creek, New South Wales	26–28 April		(Australia) Will Power	(Australia) Stewart McColl	Ralt Australia
3	R1	Hidden Valley Raceway	Darwin, Northern Territory	17–19 May	(Singapore) Christian Murchison	(Australia) Stewart McColl	(Australia) Stewart McColl	Ralt Australia
3	R2	Hidden Valley Raceway	Darwin, Northern Territory	17–19 May		(Australia) Stewart McColl	(Singapore) Christian Murchison	Hocking Motorsport
4	R1	Oran Park Raceway	Sydney, New South Wales	14–16 June	(Australia) Will Power	(Singapore) Christian Murchison	(Australia) Will Power	Ralt Australia
4	R2	Oran Park Raceway	Sydney, New South Wales	14–16 June		(Australia) Will Power	(Australia) Will Power	Ralt Australia
5	R1	Mallala Motor Sport Park	Mallala, South Australia	2–4 August	(Australia) Will Power	(Australia) Will Power	(Australia) Will Power	Ralt Australia
5	R2	Mallala Motor Sport Park	Mallala, South Australia	2–4 August		(Australia) Will Power	(Australia) Peter Hill	Greg Murphy Racing
6	R1	Winton Motor Raceway	Benalla, Victoria	16–18 August	(Singapore) Christian Murchison	(Australia) Tim Leahey	(Australia) Will Power	Ralt Australia
6	R2	Winton Motor Raceway	Benalla, Victoria	16–18 August		(Australia) Will Power	(Australia) Will Power	Ralt Australia

== Points system ==
Championship points were awarded on a 20–15–12–10–8–6–4–3–2–1 basis to the first ten finishers in each race.

== Championship standings ==
Position	Driver	No	Car	Entrant	Rd1 R1	Rd1 R2	Rd2 R1	Rd2 R2	Rd3 R1	Rd3 R2	Rd4 R1	Rd4 R2	Rd5 R1	Rd5 R2	Rd6 R1	Rd6 R2	Total
1	Will Power	11	Reynard 94D	Ralt Australia	20	20	15	15	-	12	20	20	20	15	20	20	197
2	Stewart McColl	12	Reynard 96D	Ralt Australia	-	-	20	20	20	15	12	12	10	12	12	10	143
3	Peter Hill	22; 4	Reynard 95D; Reynard 94D; Reynard 97D	Peter Hill; Murphy Motorsport	12	15	10	12	-	4	-	10	15	20	8	4	110
4	Christian Murchison	75	Reynard 97D	Hocking Motorsport	15	6	-	-	15	20	15	15	-	-	-	8	94
5	Akihiro Asai	74	Reynard 97D	Hocking Motorsport	10	3	8	10	10	8	10	-	-	2	15	12	88
6	Nelson Hartley	7	Reynard 93D	Ken Smith Motorsport	-	-	-	8	8	6	-	-	12	10	6	6	56
7	Peter Hackett	66; 5	Reynard 95D	Peter Hill; Murphy Motorsport	-	10	12	6	12	10	-	-	-	-	-	-	50
8	Roger Oakeshott	28; 6	Reynard 97D	Roger Oakshott; Sportsmed SA	8	8	4	2	-	-	8	-	8	8	2	1	49
9	Terry Clearihan	27	Reynard 92D	National Neon Signs	-	1	-	1	6	3	6	6	-	6	4	3	36
10	Ian Peters	24	Reynard 91D; Reynard 96D	Peters Racing	-	4	3	4	-	1	-	8	6	4	-	-	30
11	Rohan Carrig	49	Reynard 92D; Reynard 98D	CRD Motorsport	-	-	6	3	3	-	4	4	3	-	3	2	28
12	Tim Leahey	5	Reynard 95D	Murphy Motorsport	-	-	-	-	-	-	-	-	-	-	10	15	25
13	Mark Noske	12	Reynard 96D	John Herman	-	12	-	-	-	-	-	-	-	-	-	-	12
14	Les Crampton	76	Reynard 96D; Reynard 97D	Hocking Motorsport	-	2	2	-	-	-	3	3	-	-	-	-	10
15	Brett Campbell	10	Reynard 90D	Ralt Australia	-	-	-	-	-	-	-	-	4	3	-	-	7
16	Mark Ellis	17	Reynard 92D	Mantis Racing	-	-	-	-	4	2	-	-	-	-	1	-	7

=== Notes ===
- Points shown in the above table include minor variations from those shown in the referenced source due to mathematical errors evident in that source.
- Formula Holden regulations required cars to use an approved Holden V6 engine.

=== Silver Star ===
The Silver Star award was won by Roger Oakeshott ahead of Terry Clearihan and Rohan Carrig.
