= 2000 Australian Formula Ford Championship =

Motor racing competition

Seasons
- ← 1999 2001 →

The 2000 Australian Formula Ford Championship was open to drivers of racing cars complying with CAMS Formula Ford regulations. The title was contested over an eight-round series, with two races per round.

The championship was won by Luke Youlden in a closely-fought battle with future V8 Supercar champion, Rick Kelly.

== Calendar ==
Round	Circuit	Dates	Round winner	Map
1	(Victoria (state)) Phillip Island Grand Prix Circuit	13 February	(Australia) Leanne Ferrier	2000 Australian Formula Ford Championship is located in Australia
2	(Western Australia) Wanneroo Raceway	19 March	(Australia) Stuart Kostera Jr	2000 Australian Formula Ford Championship is located in Australia
3	(New South Wales) Eastern Creek Raceway	30 April	(Australia) Luke Youlden (Australia) Nick Agland	2000 Australian Formula Ford Championship is located in Australia
4	(Victoria (state)) Phillip Island Grand Prix Circuit	7 May	(Australia) Luke Youlden (Australia) Owen Kelly	2000 Australian Formula Ford Championship is located in Australia
5	Queensland Raceway	2 July	(Australia) Rick Kelly	2000 Australian Formula Ford Championship is located in Australia
6	(New South Wales) Oran Park Raceway	30 July	(Australia) Stewart McColl	2000 Australian Formula Ford Championship is located in Australia
7	(Victoria (state)) Calder Park Raceway	20 August	(Australia) Stewart McColl (Australia) Will Davison	2000 Australian Formula Ford Championship is located in Australia
8	(South Australia) Mallala Motor Sport Park	27 August	(Australia) Rick Kelly	2000 Australian Formula Ford Championship is located in Australia

== Results ==
Championship points were awarded at each race on the following basis:

Position	1st	2nd	3rd	4th	5th	6th	7th	8th	9th	10th
Points	20	16	14	12	10	8	6	4	2	1

Pos	Driver	No.	Car	Entrant	(Victoria (state)) PHI	(Western Australia) WAN	(New South Wales) EAS	(Victoria (state)) PHI	(Queensland) QUE	(New South Wales) ORA	(Victoria (state)) CAL	(South Australia) MAL	Pts
1	(Australia) Luke Youlden	53	Mygale SJ2000	Dugal McDougall Motorsport	28	8	36	32	16	22	1	28	171
2	(Australia) Rick Kelly	26	Stealth Van Diemen RF94	Rick Kelly	12	8	-	30	36	30	14	40	170
3	(Australia) Leanne Ferrier	7	Stealth Van Diemen RF94	Garry Rogers Motorsport	40	32	14	6	26	2	4	11	135
4	(Australia) Stewart McColl	11	Van Diemen RF98	Kmart Racing	-	26	-	-	30	40	36	-	132
4	(Australia) Nick Agland	56	Spectrum 05	Action Motorsport	14	12	36	10	20	10	2	28	132
6	(Australia) Will Davison	41	Van Diemen RF95	Sonic Motor Racing Services	26	-	-	28	-	-	36	28	118
7	(Australia) Will Power	74	Spectrum 07	Robert Power	24	26	12	-	12	4	16	-	94
8	(Australia) Owen Kelly	10	Spectrum 07	Owen Kelly	8	-	14	32	10	8	-	-	72
9	(Australia) Justin Cotter	6	Spectrum 06b	Factory Enterprises Pty Ltd	12	2	10	-	-	22	24	-	70
10	(Australia) Stuart Kostera Jr	4	Stealth Van Diemen RF94	Fastlane Racing	1	40	8	-	16	-	-	-	65
11	(Australia) Ty Hanger	15	Spectrum 06b	Hanger Racing	7	14	12	8	-	-	2	10	53
12	(Australia) Barton Mawer	82	Van Diemen RF94	Barton Mawer	-	2	14	10	1	18	-	2	47
13	(Australia) Chris Dell	25	Stealth Van Diemen RF94	Fastlane Racing	2	2	-	-	2	22	7	2	37
14	(Australia) Daniel Orr	40	Van Diemen RF94	Daniel Orr	10	4	-	2	-	6	-	12	34
15	(Australia) Andrew Jones	17	Van Diemen RF94	Brad Jones Racing	-	-	-	-	-	-	28	-	28
16	(Australia) Simon Wheeler	12	Van Diemen RF98	Fastlane Racing	-	10	3	12	-	-	-	-	25
17	(Australia) Marcus Marshall	30	Spectrum 07	Borland Racing Developments	-	-	2	4	-	-	-	16	22
18	(Australia) Tom Ceveri	16	Van Diemen RF94		-	-	-	-	-	-	16	-	16
19	(Australia) Greg Woodrow	62	Mygale SJ97	Dugal McDougall Motorsport	-	-	12	2	-	-	-	-	14
20	(Australia) Robert Jones	21	Van Diemen RF94	Robert Jones	-	-	9	-	1	1	-	-	11
21	(Australia) Glen Hastings	84	Van Diemen RF94		-	-	-	9	-	-	-	-	9
22	(New Zealand) Phil Hellebrekers	20	Spectrum 07	Phil Hellebrekers	-	-	-	-	6	-	-	1	7
23	(Australia) Steven Grocl	48	Van Diemen RF97	Steven Grocl	-	-	-	-	6	-	-	-	6
24	(Australia) Chris Templer	77	Spectrum 07	Chris Templer	-	-	-	1	-	-	-	4	5
24	(Australia) Peter Carr	42	Mygale SJ98	P Carr	-	-	4	-	-	1	-	-	5
26	(Australia) Stuart Dedear	87	Spectrum 06b	Worldexchange Bartercard Racing	-	-	-	-	-	-	-	4	4
Pos	Driver	No.	Car	Entrant	(Victoria (state)) PHI	(Western Australia) WAN	(New South Wales) EAS	(Victoria (state)) PHI	(Queensland) QUE	(New South Wales) ORA	(Victoria (state)) CAL	(South Australia) MAL	Pts
