= 2001 Australian Drivers' Championship =

Motor racing competition

Seasons
- ← 2000 2002 →

The 2001 Australian Drivers' Championship was a CAMS sanctioned national motor racing title for drivers of cars conforming to Formula Holden regulations, with the winner awarded the 2001 CAMS Gold Star. This, the 45th Australian Drivers' Championship, was promoted as the 2001 Holden Australian Drivers' Championship.

Rick Kelly dominated the series driving a Birrana Racing Reynard 94D Holden. Kelly won twelve of the 16 races and finished 151 points ahead of runner up Christian Murchison (Reynard 97D Holden), the largest winning points margin in ADC history. Third in the point score was Alan Gurr (Reynard 94D Holden). The four races not won by Kelly were won by Birrana Racing teammates, both former champions making guest appearances. Dual champion Simon Wills took three victories with three-time champion Paul Stokell winning the final race of the season at Winton Motor Raceway.

== Teams and drivers ==
Entrant	Chassis	No	Driver	Rounds
Birrana Racing	Reynard 94D	1	(New Zealand) Simon Wills	2–3
Birrana Racing	Reynard 94D	1	(Australia) Paul Stokell	8
Birrana Racing	Reynard 94D	2	(Australia) Rick Kelly	All
Birrana Racing	Reynard 95D	9	(Australia) Brenton Ramsay	7–8
Paul Stephenson Racing	Reynard 92D	3	(Australia) Paul Stephenson	1–2
Ralt Australia	Reynard 94D	11	(Australia) Alan Gurr	1, 3–8
Ralt Australia	Reynard 92D	11	(Australia) Alan Gurr	2
Ralt Australia	Reynard 97D	12	(United States) Emerson Newton-John	5
Ralt Australia	Reynard 97D	12	(Australia) Chris Staff	8
John Herman Racing	Reynard 94D	12	(Australia) Con Toparis	4
Millar Motors	Reynard 92D	17	(Australia) Mark Ellis	2–3, 5, 7
NRC Racing	Reynard 95D	19	(Australia) Stewart McColl	1–3
NRC Racing	Reynard 95D	20	(United States) Emerson Newton-John	1–3
Cantech Engineering	Reynard 91D	24	(Australia) Ian Peters	2–8
National Neon Signs	Ralt RT23	27	(Australia) Terry Clearihan	2–8
Carrig Motorsport	Reynard 89D	49	(Australia) Rohan Carrig	1–2, 4, 7–8
Greg Murphy Racing	Reynard 94D	22	(Australia) Tim Leahey	8
Greg Murphy Racing	Reynard 97D	28	(Australia) Roger Oakeshott	8
Greg Murphy Racing	Reynard 95D	66	(Australia) Peter Hill	1–7
Hocking Motorsport	Reynard 97D	28	(Australia) Roger Oakeshott	1–7
Hocking Motorsport	Reynard 97D	74	(Australia) Chris Staff	1–2
Hocking Motorsport	Reynard 97D	74	(Australia) Con Toparis	3
Hocking Motorsport	Reynard 97D	74	(Australia) Dale Brede	4
Hocking Motorsport	Reynard 97D	74	(Australia) Chris Hocking	5
Hocking Motorsport	Reynard 97D	74	(Japan) Akihiro Asai	7–8
Hocking Motorsport	Reynard 97D	75	(Singapore) Christian Murchison	All
Hocking Motorsport	Reynard 96D	76	(United States) Emerson Newton-John	7–8

== Calendar ==
The championship was contested over an eight-round series with two races per round.

Rnd		Circuit	Date	Pole position	Fastest lap	Winning driver	Winning team
1	R1	(Victoria (state)) Phillip Island Grand Prix Circuit (Phillip Island, Victoria)	23–25 March	(Australia) Rick Kelly	(Australia) Rick Kelly	(Australia) Rick Kelly	Birrana Racing
1	R2	(Victoria (state)) Phillip Island Grand Prix Circuit (Phillip Island, Victoria)	23–25 March		(Australia) Stewart McColl	(Australia) Rick Kelly	Birrana Racing
2	R1	Adelaide Street Circuit (Adelaide, South Australia)	6–8 April	(New Zealand) Simon Wills	(New Zealand) Simon Wills	(Australia) Rick Kelly	Birrana Racing
2	R2	Adelaide Street Circuit (Adelaide, South Australia)	6–8 April		(New Zealand) Simon Wills	(New Zealand) Simon Wills	Birrana Racing
3	R1	Hidden Valley Raceway (Darwin, Northern Territory)	11–13 May	(New Zealand) Simon Wills	(New Zealand) Simon Wills	(New Zealand) Simon Wills	Birrana Racing
3	R2	Hidden Valley Raceway (Darwin, Northern Territory)	11–13 May		(New Zealand) Simon Wills	(New Zealand) Simon Wills	Birrana Racing
4	R1	Canberra Street Circuit (Canberra, Australian Capital Territory)	8–10 June	(Australia) Rick Kelly	(Australia) Rick Kelly	(Australia) Rick Kelly	Birrana Racing
4	R2	Canberra Street Circuit (Canberra, Australian Capital Territory)	8–10 June		(Australia) Rick Kelly	(Australia) Rick Kelly	Birrana Racing
5	R1	(Victoria (state)) Calder Park Raceway (Melbourne, Victoria)	13–15 July	(Australia) Rick Kelly	(Australia) Rick Kelly	(Australia) Rick Kelly	Birrana Racing
5	R2	(Victoria (state)) Calder Park Raceway (Melbourne, Victoria)	13–15 July		(Australia) Rick Kelly	(Australia) Rick Kelly	Birrana Racing
6	R1	Oran Park Raceway (Sydney, New South Wales)	27–29 July	(Australia) Rick Kelly	(Australia) Rick Kelly	(Australia) Rick Kelly	Birrana Racing
6	R2	Oran Park Raceway (Sydney, New South Wales)	27–29 July		(Australia) Rick Kelly	(Australia) Rick Kelly	Birrana Racing
7	R1	Mallala Motor Sport Park (Mallala, South Australia)	10–12 August	(Australia) Rick Kelly	(Australia) Rick Kelly	(Australia) Rick Kelly	Birrana Racing
7	R2	Mallala Motor Sport Park (Mallala, South Australia)	10–12 August		(Australia) Rick Kelly	(Australia) Rick Kelly	Birrana Racing
8	R1	(Victoria (state)) Winton Motor Raceway (Benalla, Victoria)	7–9 September	(Australia) Rick Kelly	(Australia) Paul Stokell	(Australia) Rick Kelly	Birrana Racing
8	R2	(Victoria (state)) Winton Motor Raceway (Benalla, Victoria)	7–9 September		(Australia) Rick Kelly	(Australia) Paul Stokell	Birrana Racing

== Points system ==
Championship points were awarded on a 20–15–12–10–8–6–4–3–2–1 basis for the first ten places in each race.

== Championship results ==
Pos	Driver	PHI		ADE		DAR		CAN		CAL		ORA		MAL		WIN		Points
1	(Australia) Rick Kelly	1	1	1	2	2	2	1	1	1	1	1	1	1	1	1	5	293
2	(Singapore) Christian Murchison	3	3	Ret	9	5	5	2	2	2	2	DNS	2	2	Ret	4	Ret	142
3	(Australia) Alan Gurr	Ret	DNS	3	3	Ret	4	3	Ret	10	6	2	3	3	2	5	2	130
4	(Australia) Peter Hill	6	4	5	4	DNS	11	5	4	8	4	3	4	9	4	6	6	111
5	(United States) Emerson Newton-John	2	Ret	DNS	Ret	4	Ret			3	3			4	Ret	7	3	75
6	(Australia) Stewart McColl	4	2	2	4	3	3											74
7	(Australia) Terry Clearihan			Ret	4	7	7	4	5	5	Ret	4	5	Ret	7	8	DNS	69
8	(Australia) Ian Peters	9	7	6	7	9	10	6	7	6	8	5	6	5	9	10	9	65
9	(New Zealand) Simon Wills			Ret	1	1	1											60
10	(Australia) Roger Oakeshott	8	5	4	DNS	Ret	8	Ret	8	Ret	10	6	7	Ret	Ret	Ret	8	38
11	(Australia) Paul Stokell															2	1	35
12	(Australia) Chris Hocking									4	5			6	5			32
13	(Australia) Brenton Ramsay													Ret	3	3	7	28
14	(Australia) Con Toparis					6	6	7	6									22
15	(Australia) Rohan Carrig	10	Ret	7	8			8	9	9	10			8	8	Ret	DNS	22
16	(Australia) Mark Ellis	DNS	DNS	DNS	DNS	8	9			7	9			7	6			21
17	(Australia) Dale Brede							Ret	3									12
18	(Australia) Paul Stephenson	7	6	DNS	DNS													10
19	(Australia) Tim Leahey															11	4	10
20	(Australia) Chris Staff	5	Ret	Ret	DNS											Ret	Ret	8
21	(Japan) Akihiro Asai													-	-	9	DNS	2
Pos	Driver	PHI		ADE		DAR		CAN		CAL		ORA		MAL		WIN		Points
