= Stewart McColl =

Australian racing driver

- Nationality: Australian
- Born: 12 September 1979 Newcastle, New South Wales
- Died: 9 August 2003 (aged 23) Phillip Island, Victoria

Australian Drivers' Championship
- Years active: 2001–2002
- Teams: NRC Racing; Ralt Australia
- Starts: 16
- Wins: 3
- Poles: 0
- Fastest laps: 3
- Best finish: 2nd in 2002

Previous series
- 1998 1999–2000 2003: Formula Ford NSW; Formula Ford Australia; Australian Performance Car Championship

Championship titles
- 1998: Formula Ford NSW

Stewart McColl (born 12 September 1979, died 9 August 2003) was a racing driver from Australia.

McColl was killed in a racing crash at the Phillip Island Grand Prix Circuit in 2003; his Volkswagen Golf Mk4 left the circuit at the Turn 4 hairpin and impacted an earth-filled tyre wall.

== Career results ==
=== Summary ===
Season	Series	Position	Car	Team
1998	Formula Ford New South Wales	1st	Van Diemen–Ford RF95	Stewart McColl
1999	Australian Formula Ford Championship	11th	Spectrum–Ford 06b	Stewart McColl
2000	Australian Formula Ford Championship	4th	Van Diemen–Ford RF98	Kmart Racing
2001	Formula Holden	6th	Reynard–Holden 95D	NRC Racing
2002	Formula Holden	2nd	Reynard–Holden 96D	Ralt Australia
2003	Australian GT Performance Car Championship	35th	Volkswagen Golf Mk4	Volkswagen Dealers Australia

==== Complete Formula Holden results ====
Year	Team	Car	1	2	3	4	5	6	7	8	9	10	11	12	13	14	15	16	Rank	Points
2001	NRC Racing	Reynard 95D	PHI1; 4	PHI2; 2	ADL1; 2	ADL2; 4	HID1; 3	HID2; 3	CBR1	CBR2	CAL1	CAL2	OPK1	OPK2	MAL1	MAL2	WIN1	WIN2	6th	74
2002	Ralt Australia	Reynard 96D	PHI1	PHI2	ECK1; 1	ECK2; 1	HID1; 1	HID2; 2	OPK1; 3	OPK2; 3	MAL1; 4	MAL2; 3	WIN1; 3	WIN2; 4					2nd	143
