= 2007 Just Car Insurance 500 =

2007 Supercar Championship event

(Victoria (state)) 2007 Just Car Insurance 500
Event Information
- Round 9 of 14 in the 2007 V8 Supercar Championship Series
- Date: 14–16 September 2007
- Location: Melbourne, Victoria
- Venue: Sandown International Raceway
- Weather: Fine

Results
Race 1
Distance	161 laps	500 km
Pole position	Mark Winterbottom; Ford Performance Racing	1:10.6405
Winner	Craig Lowndes; Jamie Whincup; Triple Eight Race Engineering	3:23:16.5157
Round Results
First	Craig Lowndes Jamie Whincup; Triple Eight Race Engineering	72 pts
Second	Rick Kelly Paul Radisich; HSV Dealer Team	60 pts
Third	Steven Richards Owen Kelly; Ford Performance Racing	51 pts

The 2007 Just Car Insurance 500 was an endurance motor race for V8 Supercars, held on the weekend of the 14 to 16 September at the Sandown International Raceway in Victoria, Australia. The race, which was the 40th Sandown 500, was the ninth round of the 2007 V8 Supercar Championship Series.

The race was won by Jamie Whincup and Craig Lowndes, driving a Ford Falcon BF for Team Vodafone.

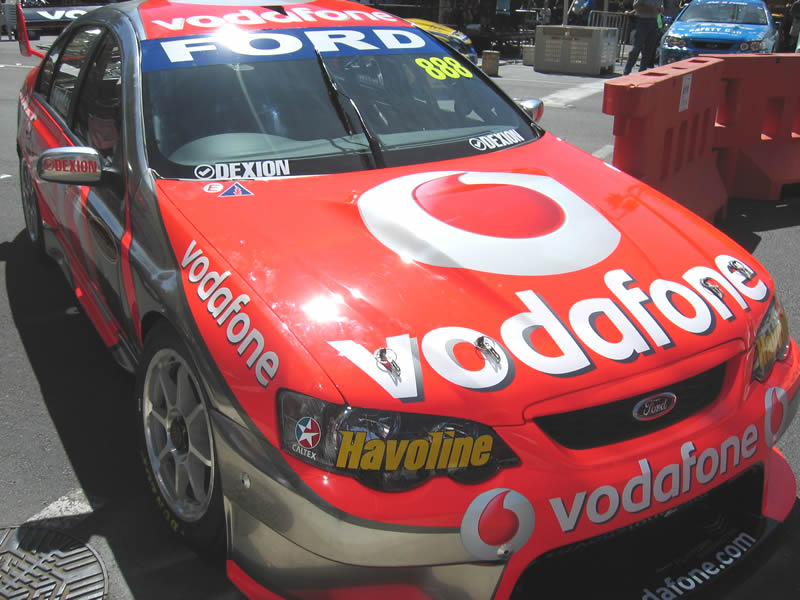
Jamie Whincup and Craig Lowndes won the race driving a Ford Falcon BF for Team Vodafone

== Results ==
=== Qualifying ===
Qualifying and the Top Ten Shootout were held on Saturday, 15 September 2007.

Pos	No	Drivers	Car	Team	Shootout	Part 2	Part 1
1	5	(Australia) Mark Winterbottom (New Zealand) Matt Halliday	Ford BF Falcon	Ford Performance Racing	1:10.6405	1:10.5655	
2	4	(Australia) James Courtney (Australia) David Besnard	Ford BF Falcon	Stone Brothers Racing	1:10.7277	1:10.4430	
3	22	(Australia) Todd Kelly (Australia) Nathan Pretty	Holden VE Commodore	Holden Racing Team	1:10.7355	1:10.4918	
4	16	(Australia) Garth Tander (New Zealand) Craig Baird	Holden VE Commodore	Toll HSV Dealer Team	1:10.7895	1:10.4559	
5	888	(Australia) Jamie Whincup (Australia) Craig Lowndes	Ford BF Falcon	Team Vodafone	1:10.7931	1:10.4711	
6	6	(New Zealand) Steven Richards (Australia) Owen Kelly	Ford BF Falcon	Ford Performance Racing	1:10.8739	1:10.6281	
7	17	(Australia) Will Davison (Australia) Steven Johnson	Ford BF Falcon	Dick Johnson Racing	1:10.9616	1:10.5391	
8	1	(Australia) Rick Kelly (New Zealand) Paul Radisich	Holden VE Commodore	Toll HSV Dealer Team	1:11.0001	1:10.6704	
9	51	(New Zealand) Jason Richards (New Zealand) Greg Murphy	Holden VE Commodore	Tasman Motorsport	1:11.3440	1:10.7157	
10	9	(Australia) Russell Ingall (Australia) Luke Youlden	Ford BF Falcon	Stone Brothers Racing	1:19.3508	1:10.6275	
11	33	(Australia) Lee Holdsworth (Australia) Dean Canto	Holden VE Commodore	Garry Rogers Motorsport		1:10.7554	
12	8	(Brazil) Max Wilson (Australia) Michael Caruso	Ford BF Falcon	WPS Racing		1:10.7601	
13	18	(Australia) Alex Davison (Australia) Andrew Thompson	Ford BF Falcon	Dick Johnson Racing		1:10.7823	
14	88	(United Kingdom) Richard Lyons (Denmark) Allan Simonsen	Ford BF Falcon	Team Vodafone		1:10.8428	
15	55	(Australia) Steve Owen (Australia) Tony D'Alberto	Holden VZ Commodore	Autobarn Racing		1:10.9802	
16	50	(Australia) Cameron McConville (Australia) David Reynolds	Holden VE Commodore	Supercheap Auto Racing		1:10.9869	
17	25	(Australia) Jason Bright (Australia) Adam Macrow	Ford BF Falcon	Britek Motorsport		1:11.0281	
18	7	(Australia) Shane Price (Australia) Jack Perkins	Holden VE Commodore	Jack Daniel's Racing		1:11.0284	
19	34	(Australia) Greg Ritter (Australia) Cameron McLean	Holden VE Commodore	Garry Rogers Motorsport		1:11.0609	
20	2	(Australia) Glenn Seton (Australia) Tony Longhurst	Holden VE Commodore	Holden Racing Team		1:11.2925	
21	10	(Australia) Jason Bargwanna (Australia) Grant Denyer	Ford BF Falcon	WPS Racing			1:11.3658
22	11	(Australia) Marcus Marshall (New Zealand) Kayne Scott	Holden VE Commodore	Jack Daniel's Racing			1:11.3810
23	021	(New Zealand) Shane van Gisbergen (New Zealand) John McIntyre	Ford BF Falcon	Team Kiwi Racing			1:11.4615
24	12	(Australia) Andrew Jones (New Zealand) Simon Wills	Ford BF Falcon	Team BOC			1:11.5038
25	20	(Australia) Paul Dumbrell (Australia) Paul Weel	Holden VE Commodore	Supercheap Auto Racing			1:11.5118
26	67	(Australia) Paul Morris (Australia) Steve Ellery	Holden VE Commodore	Team Sirromet Wines			1:11.5699
27	26	(Australia) Warren Luff (Australia) Alan Gurr	Ford BF Falcon	Britek Motorsport			1:11.7990
28	111	(Australia) Jonathon Webb (Australia) John Bowe	Ford BF Falcon	Paul Cruickshank Racing			1:11.8028
29	39	(New Zealand) Fabian Coulthard (New Zealand) Chris Pither	Holden VZ Commodore	Team Sirromet Wines			1:11.8885
30	3	(Australia) Mark Noske (Australia) Jay Verdnik	Holden VE Commodore	Tasman Motorsport			1:11.9127
31	14	(Australia) Damien White (Singapore) Christian Murchison	Ford BF Falcon	Team BOC			1:11.9297

=== Race ===
The race was held on Sunday, 16 September 2007.

Pos	No	Drivers	Team	Car	Laps	Time/Retired	Grid	Points
1	888	(Australia) Jamie Whincup (Australia) Craig Lowndes	Triple Eight Race Engineering	Ford Falcon BF	161	3:23:16.5157	5	72
2	1	(Australia) Rick Kelly (New Zealand) Paul Radisich	HSV Dealer Team	Holden Commodore VE	161	+2.7173	8	60
3	6	(New Zealand) Steven Richards (Australia) Owen Kelly	Ford Performance Racing	Ford Falcon BF	161	+13.0689	6	51
4	16	(Australia) Garth Tander (New Zealand) Craig Baird	HSV Dealer Team	Holden Commodore VE	161	+35.6291	4	45
5	33	(Australia) Lee Holdsworth (Australia) Dean Canto	Garry Rogers Motorsport	Holden Commodore VE	161	+40.2961	11	39
6	20	(Australia) Paul Dumbrell (Australia) Paul Weel	Paul Weel Racing	Holden Commodore VE	161	+59.7193	25	36
7	9	(Australia) Russell Ingall (Australia) Luke Youlden	Stone Brothers Racing	Ford Falcon BF	160	+1 lap	10	33
8	5	(Australia) Mark Winterbottom (New Zealand) Matt Halliday	Ford Performance Racing	Ford Falcon BF	160	+1 lap	1	30
9	22	(Australia) Todd Kelly (Australia) Nathan Pretty	Holden Racing Team	Holden Commodore VE	160	+1 lap	3	27
10	88	(United Kingdom) Richard Lyons (Denmark) Allan Simonsen	Triple Eight Race Engineering	Ford Falcon BF	160	+1 lap	14	24
11	55	(Australia) Steve Owen (Australia) Tony D'Alberto	Rod Nash Racing	Holden Commodore VZ	160	+1 lap	15	18
12	111	(Australia) Jonathon Webb (Australia) John Bowe	Paul Cruickshank Racing	Ford Falcon BF	160	+1 lap	28	15
13	2	(Australia) Glenn Seton (Australia) Tony Longhurst	Holden Racing Team	Holden Commodore VE	160	+1 lap	20	12
14	51	(New Zealand) Jason Richards (New Zealand) Greg Murphy	Tasman Motorsport	Holden Commodore VE	160	+1 lap	9	9
15	67	(Australia) Paul Morris (Australia) Steve Ellery	Paul Morris Motorsport	Holden Commodore VE	160	+1 lap	26	6
16	4	(Australia) James Courtney (Australia) David Besnard	Stone Brothers Racing	Ford Falcon BF	160	+1 lap	2	
17	11	(Australia) Marcus Marshall (New Zealand) Kayne Scott	Perkins Engineering	Holden Commodore VE	160	+1 lap	22	
18	34	(Australia) Greg Ritter (Australia) Cameron McLean	Garry Rogers Motorsport	Holden Commodore VE	159	+2 laps	19	
19	39	(New Zealand) Fabian Coulthard (New Zealand) Chris Pither	Paul Morris Motorsport	Holden Commodore VZ	159	+2 laps	29	
20	021	(New Zealand) Shane van Gisbergen (New Zealand) John McIntyre	Team Kiwi Racing	Ford Falcon BF	154	+7 laps	23	
DNF	18	(Australia) Alex Davison (Australia) Andrew Thompson	Dick Johnson Racing	Ford Falcon BF	140		13	
DNF	8	(Brazil) Max Wilson (Australia) Michael Caruso	WPS Racing	Ford Falcon BF	134		12	
DNF	10	(Australia) Jason Bargwanna (Australia) Grant Denyer	WPS Racing	Ford Falcon BF	127		21	
DNF	26	(Australia) Warren Luff (Australia) Alan Gurr	Britek Motorsport	Ford Falcon BF	123		27	
DNF	50	(Australia) Cameron McConville (Australia) David Reynolds	Paul Weel Racing	Holden Commodore VE	117		16	
DNF	3	(Australia) Mark Noske (Australia) Jay Verdnik	Tasman Motorsport	Holden Commodore VE	108		30	
DNF	12	(Australia) Andrew Jones (New Zealand) Simon Wills	Brad Jones Racing	Ford Falcon BF	92		24	
DNF	25	(Australia) Jason Bright (Australia) Adam Macrow	Britek Motorsport	Ford Falcon BF	77	Spun out	17	
DNF	14	(Australia) Damien White (Singapore) Christian Murchison	Brad Jones Racing	Ford Falcon BF	66		31	
DNF	7	(Australia) Shane Price (Australia) Jack Perkins	Perkins Engineering	Holden Commodore VE	35	Hydraulics	18	
DNF	17	(Australia) Will Davison (Australia) Steven Johnson	Dick Johnson Racing	Ford Falcon BF	29	Brakes	7	
