= Matthew Halliday (racing driver) =

New Zealand racing driver

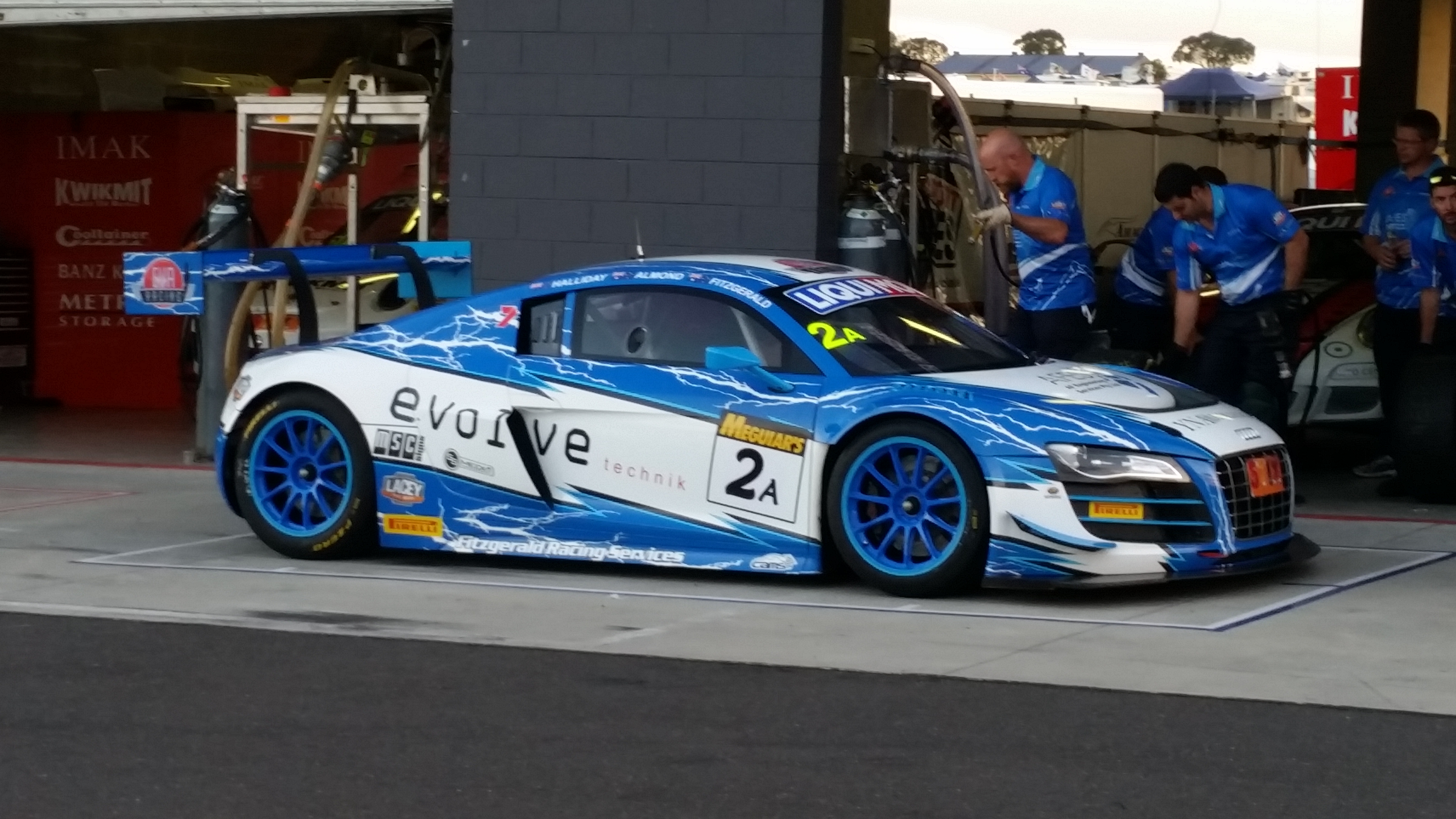
- Halliday at the 2015 Bathurst 12 Hour
- Nationality: (New Zealand) New Zealander
- Born: Matthew Brent Halliday; 14 July 1979 (age 47) Auckland, New Zealand

Porsche Supercup career
- Debut season: 2009
- Current team: SANITEC GILTRAP Racing
- Categorisation: FIA Gold
- Car number: 42
- Former teams: Jetstream Motorsport; MRS Team PZ Aschaffenburg
- Starts: 21
- Wins: 0
- Poles: 0
- Fastest laps: 0
- Best finish: 7th in 2009

Previous series
- 2007 2005–2006 2004 2003 2001 1999–2000: Champ Car World Series; A1 Grand Prix; Porsche Carrera Cup (AUS); Formula Renault V6 Eurocup; Indy Lights; Formula Holden

Awards
- 2006: Jim Clark Trophy

Matthew Brent Halliday (born 14 July 1979) is a motor racing driver. He was born in Auckland, New Zealand.

== Single seater racing ==
Halliday's formula racing career has involved various single seater series in New Zealand, Australia, Europe and the United States. Following two seasons in the Formula Holden category contesting the Australian Drivers' Championship in 1999 and 2000, he moved to the United States and ran in both the Indy Lights and Toyota Atlantic series in 2001. In 2002, he moved to the Infiniti Pro Series but was injured after two races. He finished third and fourth in the inaugural A1 Grand Prix races at Brands Hatch in 2005 and went on to have a very successful season with A1 Team New Zealand. He ran the first three races of the 2007 Champ Car World Series season for Conquest Racing, however his sponsorship ended after three races and he was replaced by Jan Heylen. He was to drive for Team Australia in the 2008 Champ Car season, but this didn't happen with the merger in to the IndyCar Series.

== GT and touring car racing ==
Halliday has been a regular in Carrera Cup racing in his native New Zealand with the odd season in the Australian Carrera Cup Championship and also the Porsche Supercup. Along with this, he has races in the Australian V8 Supercars as an endurance driver from 2004 to 2013.

== Career results ==
=== Career summary ===
Season	Series	Team	Races	Wins	Poles	F/laps	Podiums	Points	Position
1998–99	New Zealand Formula Ford Championship		?	?	?	?	?	0	-
1999	Australian Drivers' Championship	Challenge Recruitment Racing	12	0	?	?	6	107	**3rd**
2000	Formula Holden Tasman Cup	NRC International	4	0	0	1	3	81	**3rd**
2000	Australian Drivers' Championship		16	1	?	?	11	181	**3rd**
2000–01	New Zealand Formula Ford Championship		6	0	0	0	0	78	16th
2001	Toyota Atlantic Championship	Duesenberg Brothers	1	0	0	0	0	2	24th
2001	Indy Lights	Conquest Racing	9	0	0	0	2	89	6th
2001–02	New Zealand V8s Championship		?	?	?	?	?	0	-
2002	Infiniti Pro Series	Bowes Seal Fast Racing	2	0	0	0	0	44	17th
2002–03	New Zealand Porsche GT3 Cup Series		3	2	1	3	3	91	22nd
2003	Formula Renault V6 Eurocup	RD Motorsport	10	0	1	0	2	102	8th
2003–04	Porsche GT3 Cup Trans-Tasman		9	4	1	2	7	867	**2nd**
2004	Australian Carrera Cup Championship	International Motorsport	5	0	0	0	2	129	18th
2004	V8 Supercar Championship Series	Larkham Motor Sport	2	0	0	0	0	152	53rd
2004–05	New Zealand Porsche GT3 Cup Series	International Motorsport	23	7	3	10	18	1301	**2nd**
2005	V8 Supercar Championship Series	Larkham Motor Sport	2	0	0	0	0	148	51st
2005–06	New Zealand Porsche GT3 Cup Series	International Motorsport	17	6	3	7	16	1106	**3rd**
2005–06	A1 Grand Prix	A1 Team New Zealand	18	0	0	0	1	77	4th
2006	Formula V6 Asia by Renault Series	Meritus.GP	10	2	1	5	7	107	**2nd**
2006	V8 Supercar Championship Series	Ford Performance Racing	2	0	0	0	0	180	50th
2006–07	New Zealand Porsche GT3 Cup Series		15	8	2	7	10	911	**3rd**
2006–07	A1 Grand Prix	A1 Team New Zealand	8	0	0	0	2	93	**2nd**
2007	V8 Supercar Championship Series	Ford Performance Racing	2	0	0	0	0	42	33rd
2007	Champ Car World Series	Conquest Racing	3	0	0	0	0	18	21st
2007–08	Toyota Racing Series	Triple X Motorsport	9	0	1	2	5	417	15th
2008	New Zealand Porsche GT3 Cup Series	Triple X Motorsport	9	0	1	4	6	495	9th
2008	V8 Supercar Championship Series	Britek Motorsport	3	0	0	0	0	225	44th
2009	Porsche Supercup	Federsand-Jetstream Motorsport	8	0	0	0	2	93	7th
2009–10	New Zealand Porsche GT3 Cup Series	International Motorsport	18	2	2	2	9	1213	4th
2010	V8 Supercar Championship Series	Brad Jones Racing	3	0	0	0	0	209	43rd
2010	Porsche Supercup	Sanitec Giltrap Racing	9	0	0	0	0	48	13th
2011	International V8 Supercars Championship	Dick Johnson Racing	3	0	0	0	0	137	65th
2011	Porsche Supercup	MRS Team PZ Aschaffenburg; Sanitec Aquiles MRS Team	3	0	0	0	0	10	18th
2012	International V8 Supercars Championship	Triple F Racing	3	0	0	0	0	188	46th
2012	V8SuperTourers	International Motorsport	5	0	0	0	0	787	28th
2012	FIA GT1 World Championship	Exim Bank Team China	8	1	1	0	2	37	16th
2013	International V8 Supercars Championship	Lucas Dumbrell Motorsport	5	0	0	0	0	207	53rd
2013	Blancpain Endurance Series	Belgian Audi Club Team WRT	4	0	0	0	0	4	31st
2017	Australian Endurance Championship	International Motorsport	2	0	0	0	0	187	17th
2017	SprintX GT Championship Series (Pro-Am)	GMG Racing	2	0	0	0	1	35	14th
2017	Continental Tire SportsCar Challenge (Grand Sport)	GMG Racing	1	0	0	0	0	14	36th

=== American open–wheel racing results ===
(key)

==== Indy Lights ====
Year	Team	1	2	3	4	5	6	7	8	9	10	11	12	Rank	Points	Ref
2001	Conquest Racing	MTY	LBH	TXS	MIL; 9	POR; 4	KAN; 4	TOR; 4	MOH; 5	STL; 3	ATL; 8	LS; 7	FON; 3	**6th**	**89**	
2002	Bowes Seal Fast Racing	KAN; 12	NSH	MIS	KTY	STL; 7	CHI	TXS						**17th**	**44**	

==== Champ Car ====
Year	Team	No.	1	2	3	4	5	6	7	8	9	10	11	12	13	14	Rank	Points	Ref
2007	Conquest Racing	42	LVG; 16	LBH; 15	HOU; 14	POR	CLE	MTT	TOR	EDM	SJO	ROA	ZOL	ASN	SRF	MXC	**21st**	**18**	

=== Complete A1 Grand Prix results ===
(key) (Races in bold indicate pole position) (Races in italics indicate fastest lap)

Year	Entrant	1	2	3	4	5	6	7	8	9	10	11	12	13	14	15	16	17	18	19	20	21	22	DC	Points	Ref
2005–06	New Zealand	GBR; SPR; 3	GBR; FEA; 4	GER; SPR	GER; FEA	POR; SPR; 14	POR; FEA; 16	AUS; SPR	AUS; FEA	MYS; SPR; 6	MYS; FEA; 6	UAE; SPR; 15	UAE; FEA; 13	RSA; SPR; 6	RSA; FEA; 4	IDN; SPR; 8	IDN; FEA; 7	MEX; SPR; Ret	MEX; FEA; 8	USA; SPR; 8	USA; FEA; 12	CHN; SPR; 8	CHN; FEA; 4	4th	77	
2006–07	New Zealand	NED; SPR; 6	NED; FEA; 11	CZE; SPR	CZE; FEA	BEI; SPR; 10	BEI; FEA; 9	MYS; SPR	MYS; FEA	IDN; SPR	IDN; FEA	NZL; SPR	NZL; FEA	AUS; SPR	AUS; FEA	RSA; SPR; 3	RSA; FEA; 3	MEX; SPR	MEX; FEA	SHA; SPR	SHA; FEA	GBR; SPR; 16	GBR; FEA; 8	**2nd**	**93**	

=== Touring / sports cars ===
==== Complete V8 Supercar results ====
Year	Team	1	2	3	4	5	6	7	8	9	10	11	12	13	14	15	16	17	18	19	20	21	22	23	24	25	26	27	28	29	30	31	32	33	34	35	36	37	Position	Points
2004	Larkham Motor Sport	ADL	ECK	PUK	HDV	PTH	QLD	WIN	ORP	SAN; Ret	BAT; 11	SUR	SYM	ECK																									53rd	152
2005	Larkham Motor Sport	ADL	PUK	PTH	ECK	CHI	HDV	QLD	ORP	SAN; Ret	BAT; 12	SUR	SYM	ECK																									51st	148
2006	Ford Performance Racing	ADL	PUK	PTH	WIN	HDV	QLD	ORP	SAN; 15	BAT; Ret	SUR	SYM	BHN	PHI																									50th	180
2007	Ford Performance Racing	ADL	PTH	PUK	WIN	ECK	HDV	QLD	ORP	**SAN**; 8	BAT; 13	SUR	SYM	BHN	PHI																								33rd	42
2008	Britek Motorsport	ADL	ECK	HAM	PER	SAN	HDV	QLD	WIN	PHI Q 22	PHI R 21	BAT; 14	SUR	BHR	SYM	OPR																							44th	225
2010	Brad Jones Racing	YMC; R1	YMC; R2	BHR; R3	BHR; R4	ADE; R5	ADE; R6	HAM; R7	HAM; R8	QLD; R9	QLD; R10	WIN; R11	WIN; R12	HDV; R13	HDV; R14	TOW; R15	TOW; R16	PHI; Q 26	PHI; R17; Ret	BAT; R18; 4	SUR; R19	SUR; R20	SYM; R21	SYM; R22	SAN; R23	SAN; R24	SYD; R25	SYD; R26											43rd	269
2011	Dick Johnson Racing	YMC; R1	YMC; R2	ADE; R3	ADE; R4	HAM; R5	HAM; R6	PER; R7	PER; R8	PER; R9	WIN; R10	WIN; R11	HDV; R12	HDV; R13	TOW; R14	TOW; R15	QLD; R16	QLD; R17	QLD; R18	PHI; Q 10	PHI; R19; 25	BAT; R20; 25	SUR; R21	SUR; R22	SYM; R23	SYM; R24	SAN; R25	SAN; R26	SYD; R27	SYD; R28									65th	137
2012	Dick Johnson Racing	ADE; R1	ADE; R2	SYM; R3	SYM; R4	HAM; R5	HAM; R6	PER; R7	PER; R8	PER; R9	PHI; R10	PHI; R11	HDV; R12	HDV; R13	TOW; R14	TOW; R15	QLD; R16	QLD; R17	SMP; R18	SMP; R19	SAN; Q 15	SAN; R20; 16	BAT; R21; 22	SUR; R22	SUR; R23	YMC; R24	YMC; R25	WIN; R26	WIN; R27	SYD; R28	SYD; R29								46th	188
2013	Lucas Dumbrell Motorsport	ADE; R1	ADE; R2	SYM; R3	SYM; R4	SYM; R5	PUK; R6	PUK; R7	PUK; R8	PUK; R9	BAR; R10	BAR; R11	BAR; R12	COTA; R13	COTA; R14	COTA; R15	COTA; R16	HID; R17	HID; R18	HID; R19	TOW; R20	TOW; R21	QLD; R22	QLD; R23	QLD; R24	WIN; R25	WIN; R26	WIN; R27	SAN; Q 18	SAN; R28; 18	BAT; R29; Ret	SUR; R30; 16	SUR; R31; 19	PHI; R32	PHI; R33	PHI; R34	SYD; R35	SYD; R36	53rd	207

==== Complete Porsche Supercup results ====
(key) (Races in bold indicate pole position) (Races in italics indicate fastest lap)

Year	Team	1	2	3	4	5	6	7	8	9	10	11	12	13	DC	Points
2009	Jetstream Motorsport	BHR1; 3	BHR2; 8	ESP1; 3	MON; 6	TUR; 13	GBR; 5	GER	HUN	ESP2	BEL	ITA			7th	93
2009	Sanitec Racing												UAE1; 6	UAE2; 9	7th	93
2010	Sanitec Racing	BHR1; Ret	BHR2; 6	ESP1; Ret	MON; 8	ESP2; 12	GBR; 8	GER; 9	HUN; Ret	BEL; 8	ITA				13th	48
2011	MRS Team PZ Aschaffenburg	IST	CAT	MON; 10†	NNS										18th	10
2011	Sanitec Racing					SIL; 11	GER; 12	HUN	BEL	ITA	UAE1	UAE2			18th	10

† Guest driver (no points awarded)

=== Complete GT1 World Championship results ===
Year	Team	Car	1	2	3	4	5	6	7	8	9	10	11	12	13	14	15	16	17	18	Pos	Points
2012	Exim Bank Team China	Porsche	NOG; QR; 9	NOG; CR; 9	ZOL; QR; 3	ZOL; CR; 1	NAV; QR; 11	NAV; QR; 12	SVK; QR; 5	SVK; CR; 8	ALG; QR	ALG; CR	SVK; QR	SVK; CR	MOS; QR	MOS; CR	NUR; QR	NUR; CR	BUD; QR	BUD; CR	16th	37

=== Complete Bathurst 1000 results ===
Year	Team	Car	Co-driver	Position	Laps
2004	Larkham Motor Sport	Ford Falcon BA	(Australia) Mark Larkham	11th	160
2005	Larkham Motor Sport	Ford Falcon BA	(Switzerland) Alain Menu	12th	157
2006	Ford Performance Racing	Ford Falcon BA	(Australia) David Brabham	DNF	56
2007	Ford Performance Racing	Ford Falcon BF	(Australia) Owen Kelly	13th	161
2008	Britek Motorsport	Ford Falcon BF	(Australia) Marcus Marshall	14th	160
2010	Brad Jones Racing	Holden Commodore VE	(Australia) Jason Bright	4th	161
2011	Dick Johnson Racing	Ford Falcon FG	(Australia) James Moffat	25th	146
2012	Triple F Racing	Ford Falcon FG	(Australia) Dean Fiore	22nd	147
2013	Lucas Dumbrell Motorsport	Holden Commodore VF	(Australia) Dean Fiore	DNF	145
