= 2007 V8 Supercar Championship Series =

Motor racing competition

The 2007 V8 Supercar Championship Series featured the ninth V8 Supercar Championship Series which began on 1 March and concluded on 2 December. This championship consisted of 14 rounds covering all states and the Northern Territory of Australia as well as rounds in New Zealand and Bahrain. The series also carried the Australian Touring Car Championship title, which was awarded by CAMS for the 48th time in 2007.

The 2007 season was significant in that two new cars were being used by the teams. The Holden VE Commodore was a completely new car and the Ford BF Falcon consisted of several changes from the previous model. These cars debuted at the first round of the season at the Clipsal 500.

This season was also significant in that Seven Network broadcast the series for the first time since 1996, after Channel Ten and Fox Sports had rights to the series for the past ten years, and then revived in 2015.

== Teams and drivers ==
The following teams and drivers competed in the 2007 championship.

Manufacturer	Model	Team	No.	Driver name	Rounds	Co-driver name
Ford	Falcon BF	Stone Brothers Racing	4	(Australia) James Courtney	All	(Australia) David Besnard
Ford	Falcon BF	Stone Brothers Racing	9	(Australia) Russell Ingall	All	(Australia) Luke Youlden
Ford	Falcon BF	Ford Performance Racing	5	(Australia) Mark Winterbottom	All	(Australia) Owen Kelly (New Zealand) Matt Halliday
Ford	Falcon BF	Ford Performance Racing	6	(New Zealand) Steven Richards	All	(Australia) Owen Kelly (New Zealand) Matt Halliday
Ford	Falcon BF	WPS Racing	8	(Brazil) Max Wilson	All	(Australia) Michael Caruso (Australia) Grant Denyer
Ford	Falcon BF	WPS Racing	10	(Australia) Jason Bargwanna	All	(Australia) Michael Caruso (Australia) Grant Denyer
Ford	Falcon BF	Brad Jones Racing	12	(Australia) Andrew Jones	All	(Australia) Damien White (Singapore) Christian Murchison
Ford	Falcon BF	Brad Jones Racing	14	(Australia) Brad Jones	1–3	(Australia) Damien White (Singapore) Christian Murchison
Ford	Falcon BF	Brad Jones Racing	14	(New Zealand) Simon Wills	4–14	(Australia) Damien White (Singapore) Christian Murchison
Ford	Falcon BF	Dick Johnson Racing	17	(Australia) Steven Johnson	All	(Australia) Alex Davison (Australia) Andrew Thompson
Ford	Falcon BF	Dick Johnson Racing	18	(Australia) Will Davison	All	(Australia) Alex Davison (Australia) Andrew Thompson
Ford	Falcon BF	Team Kiwi Racing	021	(Australia) Adam Macrow	1	—N/a
Ford	Falcon BF	Team Kiwi Racing	021	(New Zealand) Paul Radisich	2–4	—N/a
Ford	Falcon BF	Team Kiwi Racing	021	(New Zealand) Shane van Gisbergen	8–14	(New Zealand) John McIntyre
Ford	Falcon BF	Britek Motorsport	25	(Australia) Jason Bright	All	(Australia) Adam Macrow
Ford	Falcon BF	Britek Motorsport	26	(Australia) Alan Gurr	All	(Australia) Warren Luff
Ford	Falcon BF	Triple Eight Race Engineering	88	(Australia) Jamie Whincup	All	(Denmark) Allan Simonsen (United Kingdom) Richard Lyons
Ford	Falcon BF	Triple Eight Race Engineering	888	(Australia) Craig Lowndes	All	(Denmark) Allan Simonsen (United Kingdom) Richard Lyons
Ford	Falcon BF	Paul Cruickshank Racing	111	(Australia) John Bowe	All	(Australia) Jonathon Webb
Holden	Commodore VZ	Perkins Engineering	11	(Australia) Jack Perkins	1-3	—N/a
Holden	Commodore VZ	Paul Weel Racing	50	(Australia) Cameron McConville	1–6	—N/a
Holden	Commodore VZ	Garry Rogers Motorsport	33	(Australia) Lee Holdsworth	1–6	—N/a
Holden	Commodore VZ	Paul Morris Motorsport	39	(New Zealand) Fabian Coulthard	1–6, 8–10	(New Zealand) Chris Pither
Holden	Commodore VZ	Paul Morris Motorsport	39	(Australia) Steven Ellery	7	(New Zealand) Chris Pither
Holden	Commodore VZ	Paul Morris Motorsport	39	(Australia) Owen Kelly	11–14	(New Zealand) Chris Pither
Holden	Commodore VZ	Rod Nash Racing	55	(Australia) Steve Owen	All	(Australia) Tony D'Alberto
Holden	Commodore VE	HSV Dealer Team (HRT)	1	(Australia) Rick Kelly	All	(New Zealand) Craig Baird (New Zealand) Paul Radisich
Holden	Commodore VE	HSV Dealer Team (HRT)	16	(Australia) Garth Tander	All	(New Zealand) Craig Baird (New Zealand) Paul Radisich
Holden	Commodore VE	Holden Racing Team	2	(Australia) Mark Skaife	1–8, 10–14	(Australia) Glenn Seton (Australia) Nathan Pretty
Holden	Commodore VE	Holden Racing Team	2	(Australia) Tony Longhurst	9	(Australia) Glenn Seton (Australia) Nathan Pretty
Holden	Commodore VE	Holden Racing Team	22	(Australia) Todd Kelly	All	(Australia) Glenn Seton (Australia) Nathan Pretty
Holden	Commodore VE	Tasman Motorsport	3	(New Zealand) Jason Richards	All	(Australia) Mark Noske (Australia) Jay Verdnik
Holden	Commodore VE	Tasman Motorsport	51	(New Zealand) Greg Murphy	All	(Australia) Mark Noske (Australia) Jay Verdnik
Holden	Commodore VE	Perkins Engineering	7	(Australia) Shane Price	All	(New Zealand) Kayne Scott (Australia) Marcus Marshall
Holden	Commodore VE	Perkins Engineering	11	(Australia) Jack Perkins	4–12	(New Zealand) Kayne Scott (Australia) Marcus Marshall
Holden	Commodore VE	Perkins Engineering	11	(Australia) Marcus Marshall	13–14	(New Zealand) Kayne Scott (Australia) Marcus Marshall
Holden	Commodore VE	Paul Weel Racing	20	(Australia) Paul Dumbrell	1–6, 8–14	(Australia) Paul Weel
Holden	Commodore VE	Paul Weel Racing	20	(Australia) Paul Weel	7	(Australia) Paul Weel
Holden	Commodore VE	Paul Weel Racing	50	(Australia) Cameron McConville	7–14	(Australia) David Reynolds
Holden	Commodore VE	Garry Rogers Motorsport	33	(Australia) Lee Holdsworth	7–14	(Australia) Greg Ritter (Australia) Cameron McLean
Holden	Commodore VE	Garry Rogers Motorsport	34	(Australia) Dean Canto	All	(Australia) Greg Ritter (Australia) Cameron McLean
Holden	Commodore VE	Paul Morris Motorsport	67	(Australia) Paul Morris	All	(Australia) Steven Ellery

=== Team changes ===
The Holden Racing Team and HSV Dealer Team temporarily had their TEGA licences revoked due to issues relating to the ownership of both teams, where under V8 Supercar regulations one person can only own one team. Officially, Mark Skaife owned HRT and John Kelly (father of drivers Todd and Rick) owned HSV Dealer Team, however the close relationship between the two and the presence of Tom Walkinshaw in both teams clouded the ownership. Both teams had their licenses reinstated temporarily pending the presentation of documents proving the ownership of each team to TEGA. On 22 February 2007, the HSV Dealer Team produced the required documents and were fully reinstated to the championship, followed by HRT who were reinstated on 27 February 2007 after they satisfied TEGA that Mark Skaife was the true owner of the team.

WPS Racing underwent a complete re-structure of the team with Team Principal Mark Larkham departing.

Team Kiwi Racing swapped from running Paul Morris Motorsport-prepared Holdens to Ford Performance Racing-prepared Fords for 2007. The deal with FPR was terminated after four rounds, leaving TKR on the sidelines for three events before returning at Oran Park with a Stone Brothers Racing-prepared Ford.

=== Driver changes ===
Greg Murphy moved to Tasman Motorsport, with Paul Dumbrell replacing Murphy at Paul Weel Racing.

Steven Richards was announced as the second driver for Ford Performance Racing, replacing Jason Bright. Bright moved to his own Britek Motorsport, replacing Warren Luff.

Perkins Engineering ran two V8 Supercar rookies, Shane Price and Jack Perkins. Perkins was replaced with Marcus Marshall for Bahrain and Launceston after he was diagnosed with Type 1 diabetes.

Andrew Jones joined his father's and uncle's team and raced in the second Brad Jones Racing car.

Alan Gurr drove for Britek Motorsport as the teammate to Jason Bright.

John Bowe replaced Marcus Marshall at Paul Cruikshank Racing in his final year of V8 Supercar racing before retirement.

Fabian Coulthard was dropped from Paul Morris Motorsport's older VZ Commodore after the Bathurst 1000 and replaced with Ford Performance Racing's endurance co-driver, Owen Kelly.

Paul Radisich was retained by Team Kiwi Racing, but was unavailable for the first round as he was recovering from his 2006 season-ending crash at Bathurst. Reigning Fujitsu Series champion Adam Macrow substituted for him. Radisich later left the team entirely after their deal with FPR fell over, and was replaced with rookie Shane van Gisbergen for the duration of the season when the team returned with Stone Brothers machinery.

=== Mid-season changes ===
Simon Wills replaced Brad Jones at Brad Jones Racing after round 3. Jones announced his retirement from full-time driving.

== Race calendar ==
Rd.	Race title	Circuit	Location	Date
1	(South Australia) Clipsal 500	Adelaide Street Circuit	Adelaide, South Australia	1–4 March
2	(Western Australia) BigPond 400	Barbagallo Raceway	Wanneroo, Western Australia	23–25 March
3	(New Zealand) PlaceMakers V8 Supercars	Pukekohe Park Raceway	Pukekohe, New Zealand	20–22 April
4	(Victoria (state)) Winton	Winton Motor Raceway	Benalla, Victoria	18–20 May
5	(New South Wales) Eastern Creek Raceway	Eastern Creek Raceway	Eastern Creek, New South Wales	9–11 June
6	(Northern Territory) Skycity Triple Crown	Hidden Valley Raceway	Darwin, Northern Territory	22–24 June
7	Queensland 300	Queensland Raceway	Ipswich, Queensland	20–22 July
8	(New South Wales) Jim Beam 400	Oran Park Raceway	Oran Park, New South Wales	17–19 August
9	(Victoria (state)) Just Car Insurance 500	Sandown Raceway	Springvale, Victoria	14–16 September
10	(New South Wales) Supercheap Auto Bathurst 1000	Mount Panorama Circuit	Bathurst, New South Wales	4–7 October
11	(Queensland) V8 Supercar Challenge	Surfers Paradise Street Circuit	Surfers Paradise, Queensland	18–21 October
12	(Bahrain) Desert 400	Bahrain International Circuit	Sakhir, Bahrain	1–3 November
13	Falken Tasmania Challenge	Symmons Plains Raceway	Launceston, Tasmania	16–18 November
14	(Victoria (state)) Dunlop Grand Finale	Phillip Island Grand Prix Circuit	Phillip Island, Victoria	30 November – 2 December

Australian rounds
New Zealand rounds
Bahrain rounds

=== Rule changes ===
- Points would only be awarded to the top 15 finishers.
- The top ten shootout would only be run at the endurance events.
- A single 45-minute qualifying session would be held in a fashion similar to Formula One, where all cars compete in the first 15 minutes. The quickest 20 would then complete in the second 15 minutes and the quickest 10 would complete in the final 15 minutes.
- No rounds would be dropped for the championship.
- There would be a greater spread of points between the point scoring positions.

== Results and standings ==
=== Season summary ===
Round	Race	Event	Pole position	Race winners	Round winner	Report
1	R1	Adelaide	(Australia) James Courtney	(Australia) Todd Kelly	(Australia) Todd Kelly (Holden Racing Team, Holden)	report
1	R2	Adelaide		(Australia) Rick Kelly	(Australia) Todd Kelly (Holden Racing Team, Holden)	report
2	R1	Perth	(Australia) Garth Tander	(Australia) Garth Tander	(Australia) Garth Tander (HSV Dealer Team, Holden)	report
2	R2	Perth		(Australia) Garth Tander	(Australia) Garth Tander (HSV Dealer Team, Holden)	report
2	R3	Perth		(Australia) Garth Tander	(Australia) Garth Tander (HSV Dealer Team, Holden)	report
3	R1	Pukekohe	(Australia) Mark Winterbottom	(Australia) Garth Tander	(Australia) Rick Kelly (HSV Dealer Team, Holden)	report
3	R2	Pukekohe		(Australia) Garth Tander	(Australia) Rick Kelly (HSV Dealer Team, Holden)	report
3	R3	Pukekohe		(Australia) Rick Kelly	(Australia) Rick Kelly (HSV Dealer Team, Holden)	report
4	R1	Winton	(Australia) Todd Kelly	(Australia) Jamie Whincup	(Australia) Jamie Whincup (Triple Eight Race Engineering, Ford)	report
4	R2	Winton		(Australia) Garth Tander	(Australia) Jamie Whincup (Triple Eight Race Engineering, Ford)	report
4	R3	Winton		(Australia) Garth Tander	(Australia) Jamie Whincup (Triple Eight Race Engineering, Ford)	report
5	R1	Eastern Creek	(Australia) Todd Kelly	(Australia) Mark Skaife	(Australia) Mark Skaife (Holden Racing Team, Holden)	report
5	R2	Eastern Creek		(Australia) Mark Skaife	(Australia) Mark Skaife (Holden Racing Team, Holden)	report
5	R3	Eastern Creek		(Australia) Todd Kelly	(Australia) Mark Skaife (Holden Racing Team, Holden)	report
6	R1	Darwin	(Australia) Rick Kelly	(Australia) Mark Skaife	(Australia) Craig Lowndes (Triple Eight Race Engineering, Ford)	report
6	R2	Darwin		(Australia) Craig Lowndes	(Australia) Craig Lowndes (Triple Eight Race Engineering, Ford)	report
6	R3	Darwin		(Australia) Craig Lowndes	(Australia) Craig Lowndes (Triple Eight Race Engineering, Ford)	report
7	R1	Ipswich	(Australia) Jamie Whincup	(Australia) Garth Tander	(Australia) Garth Tander (HSV Dealer Team, Holden)	report
7	R2	Ipswich		(Australia) Garth Tander	(Australia) Garth Tander (HSV Dealer Team, Holden)	report
7	R3	Ipswich		(Australia) Garth Tander	(Australia) Garth Tander (HSV Dealer Team, Holden)	report
8	R1	Oran Park	(Australia) Todd Kelly	(Australia) Mark Skaife	(Australia) Lee Holdsworth (Garry Rogers Motorsport, Holden)	report
8	R2	Oran Park		(Australia) Craig Lowndes	(Australia) Lee Holdsworth (Garry Rogers Motorsport, Holden)	report
8	R3	Oran Park		(Australia) Lee Holdsworth	(Australia) Lee Holdsworth (Garry Rogers Motorsport, Holden)	report
9		Sandown	(Australia) Mark Winterbottom	(Australia) Craig Lowndes (Australia) Jamie Whincup (Triple Eight Race Engineering, Ford)		report
10		Bathurst	(Australia) Mark Winterbottom	(Australia) Craig Lowndes (Australia) Jamie Whincup (Triple Eight Race Engineering, Ford)		report
11	R1	Gold Coast	(Australia) Garth Tander	(Australia) Garth Tander	(Australia) Garth Tander (HSV Dealer Team, Holden)	report
11	R2	Gold Coast		(Australia) Garth Tander	(Australia) Garth Tander (HSV Dealer Team, Holden)	report
11	R3	Gold Coast		(New Zealand) Steven Richards	(Australia) Garth Tander (HSV Dealer Team, Holden)	report
12	R1	Bahrain	(Australia) Mark Winterbottom	(Australia) Mark Winterbottom	(Australia) Mark Winterbottom (Ford Performance Racing, Ford)	report
12	R2	Bahrain		(Australia) Mark Winterbottom	(Australia) Mark Winterbottom (Ford Performance Racing, Ford)	report
12	R3	Bahrain		(Australia) Craig Lowndes	(Australia) Mark Winterbottom (Ford Performance Racing, Ford)	report
13	R1	Launceston	(Australia) Garth Tander	(Australia) Garth Tander	(Australia) Jamie Whincup (Triple Eight Race Engineering, Ford)	report
13	R2	Launceston		(Australia) Jamie Whincup	(Australia) Jamie Whincup (Triple Eight Race Engineering, Ford)	report
13	R3	Launceston		(Australia) Jamie Whincup	(Australia) Jamie Whincup (Triple Eight Race Engineering, Ford)	report
14	R1	Phillip Island	(Australia) Rick Kelly	(Australia) Garth Tander	(Australia) Garth Tander (HSV Dealer Team, Holden)	report
14	R2	Phillip Island		(Australia) Garth Tander	(Australia) Garth Tander (HSV Dealer Team, Holden)	report
14	R3	Phillip Island		(Australia) Todd Kelly	(Australia) Garth Tander (HSV Dealer Team, Holden)	report

=== Points system ===
Event format	Position, points per race														
Event format	1st	2nd	3rd	4th	5th	6th	7th	8th	9th	10th	11th	12th	13th	14th	15th
One Race	72	60	51	45	39	36	33	30	27	24	18	15	12	9	6
Two Race	36	30	25	22	20	18	16	15	13	12	9	8	6	5	3
Three Race	24	20	17	15	13	12	11	10	9	8	6	5	4	3	2

=== Drivers championship ===
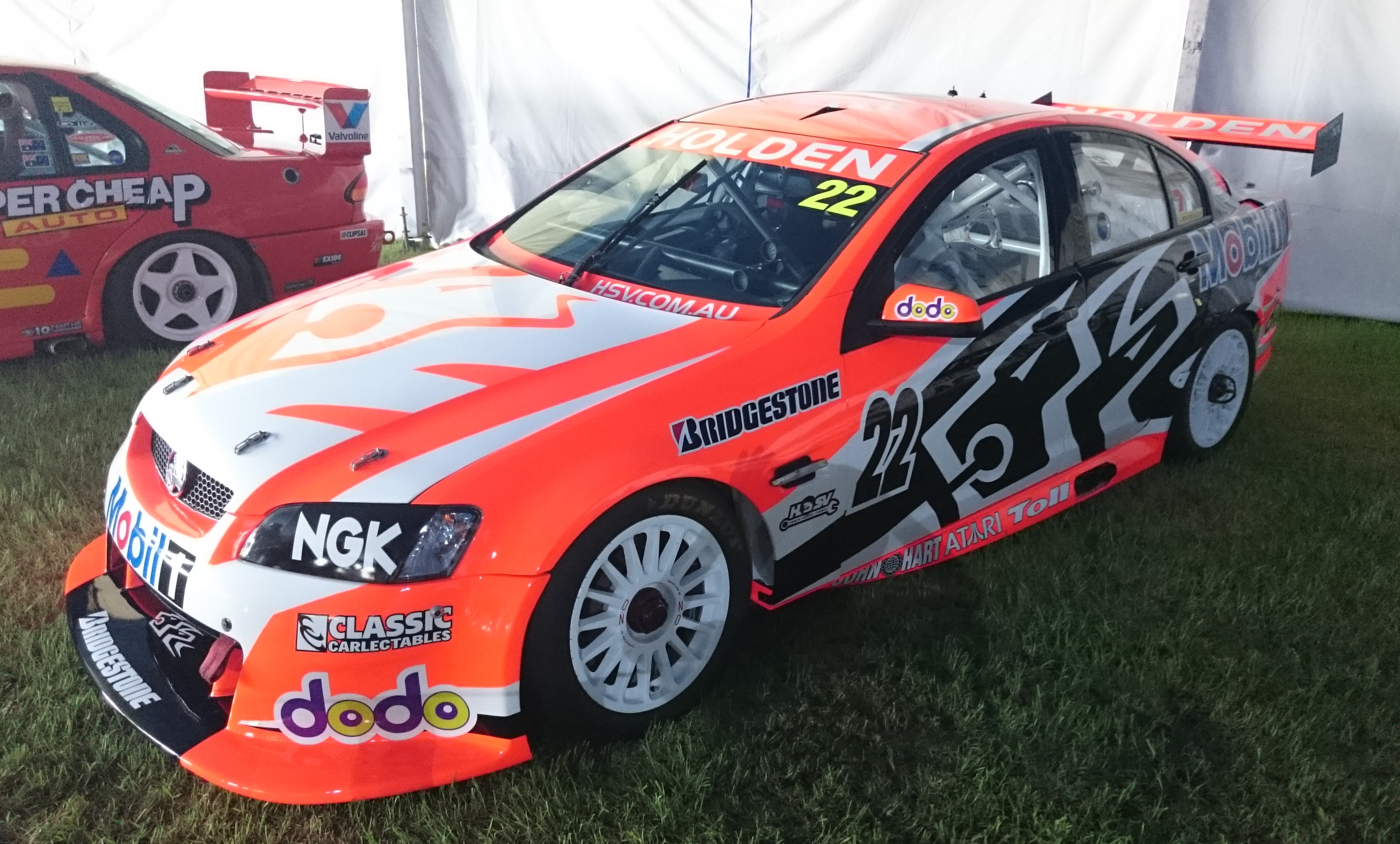
Todd Kelly placed sixth in the championship driving this Holden Commodore VE. The car is pictured in 2018.

Pos.	Driver	No.	ADE (South Australia)		BAR (Western Australia)			PUK (New Zealand)			WIN (Victoria (state))			EAS (New South Wales)			HID (Northern Territory)			QLD (Queensland)			ORA (New South Wales)			SAN (Victoria (state))	BAT (New South Wales)	SUR (Queensland)			BAH (Bahrain)			SYM (Tasmania)			PHI (Victoria (state))			Pen.	Pts.
1	(Australia) Garth Tander	16	6	10	1	1	1	1	1	8	4	1	1	5	15	5	6	3	3	1	1	1	Ret	19	2	4	Ret	1	1	8	2	14	4	1	10	Ret	1	1	4	0	625
2	(Australia) Jamie Whincup	88	3	5	7	23	18	4	2	5	1	2	2	2	3	EX	5	4	26	4	2	3	3	Ret	4	1	1	2	2	Ret	Ret	22	16	2	1	1	3	3	2	0	623
3	(Australia) Craig Lowndes	888	13	11	4	8	8	14	7	4	18	6	5	9	4	2	3	1	1	5	3	2	7	1	14	1	1	3	24	7	Ret	5	1	5	6	5	4	6	3	0	592
4	(Australia) Rick Kelly	1	4	1	2	2	3	3	3	1	3	3	3	3	2	4	2	2	2	7	16	6	2	15	15	2	Ret	7	16	6	4	12	8	6	5	Ret	5	8	10	0	552
5	(Australia) Mark Winterbottom	5	5	Ret	10	6	5	2	23	11	26	20	10	11	7	6	Ret	6	6	10	7	5	4	3	24	8	10	20	17	5	1	1	3	3	3	7	7	4	5	0	420
6	(Australia) Todd Kelly	22	1	2	Ret	10	7	6	4	2	27	11	4	4	5	1	4	8	4	8	11	19	8	2	11	9	Ret	Ret	26	Ret	11	28	Ret	12	20	Ret	6	2	1	10	381
7	(New Zealand) Steven Richards	6	11	8	22	13	9	5	18	12	2	16	12	6	6	7	7	9	8	13	Ret	Ret	5	6	5	3	10	Ret	5	1	25	6	25	4	2	2	27	12	9	0	380
8	(Australia) Mark Skaife	2	14	7	3	3	2	10	6	9	21	17	26	1	1	3	1	5	5	2	8	17	1	20	Ret		Ret	17	8	Ret	7	18	21	7	4	4	2	5	7	0	379
9	(Australia) James Courtney	4	2	3	11	Ret	Ret	9	5	3	17	15	8	Ret	14	8	16	Ret	DNS	3	4	18	19	7	Ret	16	2	6	15	4	6	2	2	28	8	6	12	7	6	0	359
10	(Australia) Will Davison	18	Ret	9	6	5	6	11	8	6	Ret	14	9	14	9	10	EX	7	7	6	5	4	6	8	16	Ret	3	11	18	11	8	3	5	9	11	14	9	9	8	0	343
11	(Australia) Russell Ingall	9	8	4	24	14	10	8	9	10	Ret	8	6	7	11	12	Ret	Ret	11	9	6	9	Ret	9	3	7	Ret	4	3	3	5	8	7	16	30	13	8	19	26	0	311
12	(Australia) Steven Johnson	17	9	6	5	4	4	13	21	16	6	5	Ret	10	8	9	11	23	18	11	22	Ret	13	12	12	Ret	3	8	13	Ret	3	4	6	8	9	8	13	11	27	0	304
13	(New Zealand) Greg Murphy	51	7	Ret	8	7	12	12	11	13	Ret	4	7	12	25	11	Ret	Ret	14	19	12	7	9	Ret	22	14	4	5	4	13	10	11	10	11	22	15	10	13	22	0	250
14	(New Zealand) Jason Richards	3	20	13	14	12	19	7	Ret	18	23	Ret	16	13	24	16	10	10	9	Ret	13	8	11	5	6	14	4	10	6	2	16	13	15	10	7	3	17	26	Ret	0	235
15	(Australia) Lee Holdsworth	33	24	12	9	9	11	17	13	17	5	Ret	DNS	23	12	Ret	14	17	10	Ret	10	10	10	4	1	5	Ret	12	27	14	Ret	25	12	Ret	13	12	11	10	11	0	209
16	(Australia) Dean Canto	34	12	18	27	25	28	25	17	Ret	19	23	14	16	Ret	DNS	9	11	15	16	15	13	18	23	Ret	5	Ret	9	14	Ret	13	7	9	20	12	10	20	16	14	0	125
17	(Brazil) Max Wilson	8	17	Ret	23	18	13	16	12	14	9	Ret	Ret	19	23	21	8	14	16	15	14	Ret	16	11	9	Ret	7	13	9	10	23	26	20	26	17	19	19	24	15	0	110
18	(Australia) Jason Bargwanna	10	15	Ret	25	22	23	20	Ret	DNS	11	22	15	15	13	13	Ret	16	13	14	Ret	21	15	27	13	Ret	7	14	7	12	9	10	11	23	23	Ret	23	18	16	0	109
19	(Australia) Steve Owen	55	16	Ret	12	Ret	24	19	19	21	13	7	11	27	Ret	Ret	13	12	19	18	Ret	Ret	Ret	23	8	11	6	15	21	Ret	Ret	27	19	15	25	Ret	18	21	Ret	0	103
20	(New Zealand) Paul Radisich	021/1			16	11	22	15	10	7	24	12	13													2	Ret													0	96
21	(Australia) Jason Bright	25	10	14	DNS	DNS	DNS	Ret	16	25	7	9	24	8	22	14	Ret	Ret	Ret	17	Ret	Ret	12	16	Ret	Ret	Ret	Ret	DNS	DNS	19	Ret	Ret	17	18	9	Ret	15	12	0	71
22	(Australia) Paul Morris	67	Ret	17	15	19	15	Ret	Ret	Ret	8	Ret	Ret	17	10	15	12	13	12	12	9	15	Ret	Ret	21	15	Ret	Ret	25	Ret	Ret	23	Ret	Ret	21	11	Ret	Ret	13	0	70
23	(Australia) Paul Dumbrell	20	Ret	20	18	17	Ret	22	Ret	Ret	25	25	21	Ret	19	18	24	21	17				25	25	10	6	12	21	Ret	Ret	14	Ret	14	13	16	Ret	25	Ret	19	0	69
24	(Australia) Owen Kelly	6/5/39																								3	13	24	23	Ret	20	19	17	18	28	Ret	Ret	22	21	0	63
25	(United Kingdom) Richard Lyons	88																								10	5													0	63
25	(Denmark) Allan Simonsen	88																								10	5													0	63
27	(Australia) David Besnard	4																								16	2													0	60
28	(Australia) Tony D'Alberto	55																								11	6													0	54
29	(Australia) Paul Weel	20																		22	Ret	Ret				6	12													0	51
30	(Australia) John Bowe	111	Ret	Ret	Ret	20	14	21	15	23	14	Ret	17	22	21	24	15	15	24	23	17	12	23	24	19	12	14	19	11	Ret	18	24	18	27	19	17	28	25	23	0	47
31	(New Zealand) Craig Baird	16																								4	Ret													0	45
32	(Australia) Nathan Pretty	22																								9	11													0	45
33	(New Zealand) Matt Halliday	5																								8	13													0	42
34	(Australia) Cameron McConville	50	21	15	19	24	16	18	14	15	12	21	22	18	16	17	20	19	20	Ret	18	14	17	22	Ret	Ret	Ret	18	10	9	Ret	20	27	19	Ret	DNS	15	Ret	18	0	35
35	(Australia) Luke Youlden	9																								7	Ret													0	33
36	(Australia) Alex Davison	18																								Ret	8													0	30
36	(Australia) Andrew Thompson	18																								Ret	8													0	30
38	(Australia) Glenn Seton	2/22																								13	11													0	30
39	(Australia) Shane Price	7	22	22	13	16	20	24	25	20	10	13	18	25	Ret	22	19	Ret	DNS	Ret	24	16	21	18	20	Ret	Ret	Ret	22	Ret	12	9	26	Ret	26	Ret	16	17	28	0	30
40	(Australia) Greg Ritter	34																								18	9													0	27
40	(Australia) Cameron McLean	34																								18	9													0	27
42	(Australia) Jonathon Webb	111																								12	14													0	25
43	(New Zealand) Shane van Gisbergen	021																					20	13	23	20	Ret	22	12	Ret	15	16	13	24	15	18	14	14	17	0	23
44	(Australia) Andrew Jones	12	25	Ret	26	28	21	26	Ret	22	Ret	10	20	24	Ret	23	18	25	23	24	23	Ret	Ret	17	7	Ret	Ret	Ret	28	Ret	22	21	22	21	27	Ret	24	Ret	20	0	19
45	(Australia) Tony Longhurst	2																								13														0	12
46	(New Zealand) Simon Wills	14/12									16	Ret	23	21	18	19	17	20	22	21	21	Ret	24	10	17	Ret	Ret	Ret	20	15	21	15	23	22	24	Ret	26	Ret	Ret	0	12
47	(New Zealand) Fabian Coulthard	39	Ret	19	17	15	17	23	20	19	20	19	19	Ret	17	20	22	22	25				14	14	Ret	19	16													0	8
48	(Australia) Steven Ellery	39/67																		20	25	Ret				15	Ret													0	6
49	(Australia) Michael Caruso	8/10																								Ret	15													0	6
49	(Australia) Grant Denyer	10																								Ret	15													0	6
51	(Australia) Jack Perkins	11	19	Ret	21	26	25	DNS	DNS	DNS	22	18	Ret	20	20	25	21	24	21	Ret	19	11	21	26	18	Ret	Ret	16	19	Ret	17	17	Ret							0	6
52	(Australia) Marcus Marshall	11																								17	Ret							14	14	16	22	20	24	0	6
53	(Australia) Alan Gurr	26	23	Ret	28	21	27	Ret	24	24	15	24	25	26	Ret	Ret	23	18	Ret	Ret	20	20	22	28	Ret	Ret	Ret	23	Ret	16	24	Ret	24	25	29	20	24	23	24	0	2
54	(Australia) Adam Macrow	021/25	18	16																						Ret	Ret													0	0
55	(New Zealand) Chris Pither	39																								19	16													0	0
56	(New Zealand) Kayne Scott	11																								17	Ret													0	0
57	(Australia) Brad Jones	14	Ret	21	20	27	26	Ret	22	Ret																														0	0
58	(New Zealand) John McIntyre	021																								20	Ret													0	0
	(Australia) David Reynolds	50																								Ret	Ret													0	0
	(Australia) Warren Luff	26																								Ret	Ret													0	0
	(Australia) Mark Noske	3																								Ret	Ret													0	0
	(Australia) Jay Verdnik	3																								Ret	Ret													0	0
	(Singapore) Christian Murchison	14																								Ret	DNS													0	0
	(Australia) Damien White	14																								Ret	DNS													0	0
Pos.	Driver	No.	ADE (South Australia)		BAR (Western Australia)			PUK (New Zealand)			WIN (Victoria (state))			EAS (New South Wales)			HID (Northern Territory)			QLD (Queensland)			ORA (New South Wales)			SAN (Victoria (state))	BAT (New South Wales)	SUR (Queensland)			BAH (Bahrain)			SYM (Tasmania)			PHI (Victoria (state))			Pen.	Pts.

=== Team championship ===
Pos	Team	Penalty	Rd 1	Rd 2	Rd 3	Rd 4	Rd 5	Rd 6	Rd 7	Rd 8	Rd 9	Rd 10	Rd 11	Rd 12	Rd 13	Rd 14	Pts
1	HSV Dealer Team	0	88	129	116	114	80	106	95	44	105	0	81	68	57	94	1177
2	Triple Eight Race Engineering	0	60	46	77	89	81	93	102	70	96	111	68	37	106	98	1134
3	Holden Racing Team	0	87	73	76	21	117	90	46	60	39	18	10	17	46	100	800
4	Ford Performance Racing	0	44	46	44	33	64	54	36	70	81	36	50	77	100	53	788
5	Stone Brothers Racing	0	92	17	66	34	35	6	62	37	33	60	78	86	26	38	670
6	Dick Johnson Racing	0	44	80	32	37	47	28	46	36	0	81	26	84	47	38	626
7	Tasman Motorsport	0	22	34	26	26	15	28	30	40	9	45	72	28	44	12	431
8	Garry Rogers Motorsport	0	16	24	4	16	5	28	22	47	39	27	20	29	22	23	322
9	WPS Racing	0	3	4	8	17	10	17	8	21	0	39	40	23		2	192
10	Paul Weel Racing	0	3	0	5	5	0	0	3	8	36	15	17	6	4	2	104
11	Rod Nash Racing (s)	0	0	5	0	21	0	9	0	10	18	36	2	0	2	0	103
12	Paul Morris Motorsport	0	0	6	0	10	10	14	16	6	6	0	0	0	6	4	78
13	Britek Motorsport	0	17	0	0	22	13	0	0	5	0	0	0	0	9	7	73
14	Team Kiwi Racing (s)	0	0	6	21	9				4	0	0	5	6	2	6	59
15	Paul Cruickshank Racing (s)	0	0	3	2	3	0	4	5	0	15	9	6	0	0	0	47
16	Perkins Engineering	0	0	4	0	12	0	0	6	0	0	0	0	14	6	0	42
17	Brad Jones Racing	0	0	0	0	8	0	0	0	19	0	0	2	2	0	0	31

- (s) denotes a single-car team.
