= Christian Murchison =

Singaporean race car driver

- Nationality: Singaporean
- Born: 1 November 1980 (age 46) Singapore

V8 Supercar Championship Series career
- Debut season: 2000, 2007
- Former teams: Perkins Engineering; Brad Jones Racing
- Starts: 3 (4 entries)
- Wins: 0
- Podiums: 0
- Poles: 0
- Best finish: NC in 2001, 2007

Previous series
- 1997–98 1997–99 2000–02 2003 2005 2006–07: West Australian Formula Ford Championship; Australian Formula Ford Championship; Australian Drivers' Championship; Formula Renault V6 Eurocup; Australian Formula 4000 Championship; A1 Grand Prix

Championship titles
- 1998: West Australian Formula Ford Championship

Christian Murchison (born 1 November 1980) is a racing driver from Singapore.

== Biography ==
In 2003, Murchison finished tenth in the Eurocup Formula Renault V6 Championship. In 2000 and 2001, he was the runner-up in the Australian Formula Holden Championship for two year consecutive years. He finished fifth in the Australian Formula Ford Championship in 1999, and won the West Australian Formula Ford Championship in 1998. He was named "Rookie of the Year" in Formula Holden in 2000 and in Formula Ford in 1998. In six years of competitive kart racing from 1992–98, he won five West Australian state titles.

In 2006, Murchison was selected to drive for the newly formed A1 Team Singapore for the A1 Grand Prix of Nations 2006-7 season. He repaid the team's management by scoring the team's first points in Singapore's third A1 GP event by finishing eighth on the Beijing Street Circuit.

Murchison has also dabbled in V8 Supercars endurance events. In 2000, he drove for Perkins Engineering, and again in 2007 with Brad Jones Racing. He has three V8 starts to his name, with the fourth - the 2007 Bathurst 1000 - cut short due to a severe accident for co-driver Damien White in Friday practice.

Murchison was born in Singapore in 1980, but moved with his family to Perth, Australia, in 1991, where he began his motor-racing career. Murchison remains based in Western Australia, running a company specialising in RV fittings.

Though required by law, Murchison has never discharged his national service liability.

== Career results ==
=== Summary ===
Season	Series	Position	Car	Team
1997	West Australian Formula Ford Championship	**2nd**	Van Diemen RF95 - Ford	Fastlane Racing
1997	Australian Formula Ford Championship	18th	Van Diemen RF95 - Ford	Fastlane Racing
1998	West Australian Formula Ford Championship	**1st**	Van Diemen RF98 - Ford	Fastlane Racing
1998	Australian Formula Ford Championship	5th	Van Diemen RF98 - Ford	Fastlane Racing
1999	Australian Formula Ford Championship	5th	Van Diemen RF98 - Ford	Christian Murchison
2000	Australian Drivers' Championship	**2nd**	Reynard 95D Holden	NRC Racing
2001	Australian Drivers' Championship	**2nd**	Reynard 97D Holden	Hocking Racing
2002	Australian Drivers' Championship	4th	Reynard 97D Holden	Hocking Racing
2003	Formula Renault V6 Eurocup	10th	Tatuus-Renault	DAMS
2005	Australian Formula 4000 Championship	9th	Reynard 97D Holden	Hocking Racing
2006-07	A1 Grand Prix of Nations	20th	Lola A1GP Zytek	A1 Team Singapore

=== Complete A1 Grand Prix results ===
(key) (Races in bold indicate pole position) (Races in italics indicate fastest lap)

Year	Entrant	1	2	3	4	5	6	7	8	9	10	11	12	13	14	15	16	17	18	19	20	21	22	DC	Points
2006–07	Singapore	NED; SPR; Ret	NED; FEA; 16	CZE; SPR; PO	CZE; FEA; PO	CHN; SPR; 16	CHN; FEA; 8	MYS; SPR; 15	MYS; FEA; 11	IDN; SPR	IDN; FEA	NZL; SPR; Ret	NZL; FEA; 15	AUS; SPR; 12	AUS; FEA; Ret	RSA; SPR; Ret	RSA; FEA; Ret	MEX; SPR	MEX; FEA	CHN; SPR	CHN; FEA	GBR; SPR	GBR; SPR	20th	3

=== Complete V8 Supercar results ===
Year	Team	1	2	3	4	5	6	7	8	9	10	11	12	13	14	Final pos	Points
2000	Perkins Engineering	PHI	PTH	ADL	ECR	HDV	CAN	QLD	WIN	ORP	CDP	QLD; Ret	SAN	BAT; Ret		NC	0
2007	Brad Jones Racing	ADL	PER	PUK	WIN	ECK	HDV	QLD	OPK	SAN; Ret	BAT; DNS	SUR	BAH	SYM	PHI	NC	0

=== Complete Bathurst 1000 results ===
Year	Team	Car	Co-driver	Position	Laps
2000	Perkins Engineering	Holden Commodore VT	(Australia) Luke Youlden	DNF	128
2007	Brad Jones Racing	Ford Falcon BF	(Australia) Damien White	DNS	0
