= 2007 Supercheap Auto Bathurst 1000 =

Motor race in Australia

Seasons
- ← 2006 2008 →

(New South Wales) 2007 Supercheap Auto Bathurst 1000
Event Information
- Round 10 of 14 in the 2007 V8 Supercar Championship Series
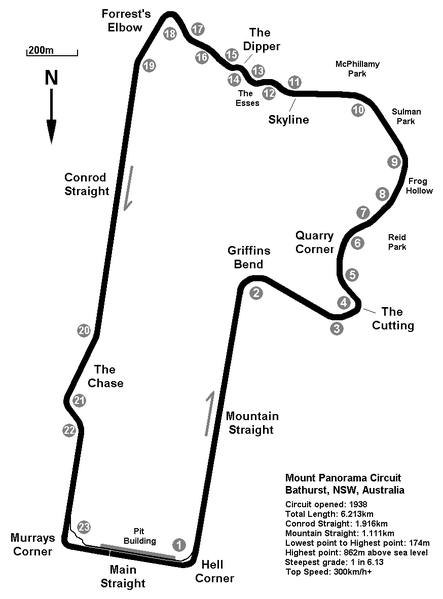
- Date: 4–7 October 2007
- Location: Bathurst, New South Wales
- Venue: Mount Panorama Circuit
- Weather: Fine, light drizzle during end of race

Results
Race 1
Distance	161 laps	1000 km
Pole position	Mark Winterbottom; Ford Performance Racing	2:07.0908
Winner	Craig Lowndes; Jamie Whincup; Triple Eight Race Engineering	6:29:10.1985
Round Results
First	Craig Lowndes Jamie Whincup; Triple Eight Race Engineering	72 pts
Second	James Courtney David Besnard; Stone Brothers Racing	60 pts
Third	Steven Johnson Will Davison; Dick Johnson Racing	51 pts

The 2007 Supercheap Auto Bathurst 1000 was an endurance race for V8 Supercars, held on 7 October 2007 at the Mount Panorama Circuit near Bathurst in New South Wales, Australia. It was the tenth round of the 2007 V8 Supercar Championship Series.

The race was the eleventh running of the Australian 1000, first held in 1997 following an organisational split that occurred with the Bathurst 1000 in that year. It was the 50th race in the combined history of the Bathurst 1000 and the Australian 1000.

== Entry list ==
31 cars were entered in the race – 15 Holden Commodores and 16 Ford Falcons. Four drivers would make their Bathurst 500/1000 debuts - Jay Verdnik, Andrew Thompson, Shane van Gisbergen and David Reynolds. Van Gisbergen would become the third youngest starter in the races' history at 17 years, 4 months and 28 days old.

A series of drivers would also make their last entries in 2007 - Simon Wills, Damien White, Christian Murchison, Cameron McLean and John Bowe, whilst it would also be the last starts for Paul Weel and Paul Radisich - despite both entering the 2008 race. The aforementioned Verdnik would make his only start in 2007.

No.	Drivers	Team	Car	No.	Drivers	Team	Car
1	(Australia) Rick Kelly (Australia) Garth Tander	HSV Dealer Team (HSV, Toll)	Holden Commodore VE	20	(Australia) Paul Dumbrell (Australia) Paul Weel	Paul Weel Racing (Supercheap Auto Insurance)	Holden Commodore VE
2	(Australia) Mark Skaife (Australia) Todd Kelly	Holden Racing Team (Holden, Mobil 1)	Holden Commodore VE	021	(New Zealand) Shane van Gisbergen (New Zealand) John McIntyre	Team Kiwi Racing (Makita)	Ford Falcon BF
3	(Australia) Mark Noske (Australia) Jay Verdnik	Tasman Motorsport (Firepower)	Holden Commodore VE	22	(Australia) Glenn Seton (Australia) Nathan Pretty	Holden Racing Team (Holden, Mobil 1)	Holden Commodore VE
4	(Australia) James Courtney (Australia) David Besnard	Stone Brothers Racing (Jeld-Wen)	Ford Falcon BF	25	(Australia) Jason Bright (Australia) Adam Macrow	Britek Motorsport (Fujitsu)	Ford Falcon BF
5	(Australia) Owen Kelly (New Zealand) Matthew Halliday	Ford Performance Racing (Orrcon Steel)	Ford Falcon BF	26	(Australia) Warren Luff (Australia) Alan Gurr	Britek Motorsport (Irwin Tools)	Ford Falcon BF
6	(Australia) Mark Winterbottom (New Zealand) Steven Richards	Ford Performance Racing (Castrol)	Ford Falcon BF	33	(Australia) Lee Holdsworth (Australia) Dean Canto	Garry Rogers Motorsport (Valvoline, Cummins)	Holden Commodore VE
7	(Australia) Shane Price (Australia) Jack Perkins	Perkins Engineering (Jack Daniel's)	Holden Commodore VE	34	(Australia) Greg Ritter (Australia) Cameron McLean	Garry Rogers Motorsport (Valvoline, Cummins)	Holden Commodore VE
8	(Australia) Jason Bargwanna (Brazil) Max Wilson	WPS Racing (WOW Sight & Sound)	Ford Falcon BF	39	(New Zealand) Fabian Coulthard (New Zealand) Chris Pither	Paul Morris Motorsport (Sirromet Wines)	Holden Commodore VZ
9	(Australia) Russell Ingall (Australia) Luke Youlden	Stone Brothers Racing (Caltex)	Ford Falcon BF	50	(Australia) Cameron McConville (Australia) David Reynolds	Paul Weel Racing (Supercheap Auto Insurance)	Holden Commodore VE
10	(Australia) Michael Caruso (Australia) Grant Denyer	WPS Racing (WPS Financial Services)	Ford Falcon BF	51	(New Zealand) Greg Murphy (New Zealand) Jason Richards	Tasman Motorsport (Firepower)	Holden Commodore VE
11	(Australia) Marcus Marshall (New Zealand) Kayne Scott	Perkins Engineering (Jack Daniel's)	Holden Commodore VE	55	(Australia) Steve Owen (Australia) Tony D'Alberto	Rod Nash Racing (Autobarn Garage Tuff)	Holden Commodore VZ
12	(Australia) Andrew Jones (New Zealand) Simon Wills	Brad Jones Racing (BOC Gas and Gear)	Ford Falcon BF	67	(Australia) Paul Morris (Australia) Steve Ellery	Paul Morris Motorsport (Sirromet Wines)	Holden Commodore VE
14	(Australia) Damien White (Singapore) Christian Murchison	Brad Jones Racing (BOC Gas and Gear)	Ford Falcon BF	88	(United Kingdom) Richard Lyons (Denmark) Allan Simonsen	Triple Eight Race Engineering (Vodafone)	Ford Falcon BF
16	(New Zealand) Paul Radisich (New Zealand) Craig Baird	HSV Dealer Team (HSV, Toll)	Holden Commodore VE	111	(Australia) John Bowe (Australia) Jonathon Webb	Paul Cruickshank Racing (Glenfords Tools)	Ford Falcon BF
17	(Australia) Steven Johnson (Australia) Will Davison	Dick Johnson Racing (Jim Beam Cola)	Ford Falcon BF	888	(Australia) Craig Lowndes (Australia) Jamie Whincup	Triple Eight Race Engineering (Vodafone)	Ford Falcon BF
18	(Australia) Alex Davison (Australia) Andrew Thompson	Dick Johnson Racing (Jim Beam Cola)	Ford Falcon BF				

== Practice ==
Free practice was held over three sessions on Thursday, 4 October and Friday, 5 October 2007.

== Qualifying ==
Qualifying was held in two stages on Friday, 5 October 2007. The opening part of the session decided grid positions 21 to 31, with the twenty fastest cars progressing to the second leg of qualifying which decided grid positions 11 to 20. The fastest ten cars progress through to the traditional Top Ten Shootout, held the following day to decide grid positions 1 to 10. During the first leg of qualifying, Damien White crashed the Team BOC #14 Falcon, sustaining a concussion and sufficient damage to the car to put White and co-driver Christian Murchison out of the race.

After qualifying three cars, the #22 Holden Racing Team Commodore of Glenn Seton and Nathan Pretty, the #20 Supercheap Auto Racing Commodore of Paul Dumbrell and Paul Weel and the #55 Autobarn Racing Commodore of Steve Owen and Tony D'Alberto were excluded from qualifying after changing engines twice when under the regulations only one engine change is allowed without penalty. Additionally, Alex Davison missed a direction to have his car weighed on the scales at the end of the second leg qualifying which saw the Dick Johnson Racing Falcon excluded from the second leg of qualifying, relegating them to 20th grid position, which later became 19th after the exclusion of the Seton/Pretty Commodore.

== Top 10 Shootout ==
The Top Ten Shootout was held on Saturday, 6 October 2007. Paul Radisich set the first time as the tenth qualifier at 2:08.4909. Lee Holdsworth undercut that time by three-tenths of a second with third car Steven Johnson improving the benchmark to 2:08.0782. Greg Murphy, Russell Ingall, James Courtney and Craig Lowndes all failed to improve on Johnson's time, with Ingall spinning off track at Murray's Corner. Garth Tander took almost eight-tenths off Johnson with Mark Skaife nudging a further tenth. Last car out, Mark Winterbottom drove a smooth clean lap and took pole position over Skaife by 0.1067 seconds.

== Race ==
The race was held on Sunday, 7 October 2007. For the first time since 1978, the race did not start at 10am. Channel Seven, who were the new broadcasters of the race, chose to start the race at 10:30am to maximise the chance of a prime-time finish. The time would change again in 2019, when it was moved to 11:30am for a similar reason.

The race had not even started before it had its first retirement. Cameron McConville's car had an engine failure heading up Mountain Straight and he retired at Griffins Bend. The race was started, which after the field had passed McConville's car, the race director deemed the car was in an unsafe position and the safety car was deployed. The race resumed on Lap 4 and was without incident until Lap 52 when Andrew Jones's car caught fire at Forrests Elbow. He was able to drive the car safely to the gravel trap in The Chase and then marshals were able to extinguish the fire. The drivers resumed racing on Lap 53. Another safety car period did not occur until lap 91 when Marcus Marshall crashed the second Jack Daniel's Racing car. On Lap 102, Jack Perkins's car caught fire inside the car in the other Jack Daniel's Racing car. Perkins was able to drive the car into the pit lane and the fire was extinguished by the Britek Motorsport crew. On Lap 118, Dean Canto slid wide and crashed at Reid Park causing another safety car period.

Earlier the #1 Toll HSV Dealer Team car was retired with persistent brake fluid problems. At the time, this would have serious implications on the championship standings. Three laps later, the sister Toll HSV Dealer Team car retired with the same problem as the #1 car. Lap 134 saw the retirement of the #26 IRWIN Racing Britek Motorsport, Alan Gurr was at the wheel, crashed upon the restart. A lap later, Mark Noske retired with problems.

=== The final hour ===
The race was considered to be an uneventful one until lap 142, when rain started to fall at different parts of the circuit, including Skyline, The Cutting and parts of Conrod Straight. Paul Morris spun the #67 Team Sirromet Wines into the wall at The Cutting, causing the safety car to be deployed. On Lap 148, rain was falling lightly on top of the mountain and five cars all fell victim to the wet conditions. Jason Bright, Russell Ingall, Mark Skaife and Shane van Gisbergen all crashed just before McPhillamy Park Corner, Van Gisbergen hitting the rear of Ingall's slowing car, causing the Team Kiwi Racing Falcon to pit. Ingall made it back to the pits, but Skaife and Bright ended up in the gravel trap. Just after the restart, Shane van Gisbergen spun at Murray's Corner. With only two laps remaining Race Control decided against deploying the safety car; instead telling crews to warn drivers.

Thirteen laps to go, Winterbottom continued to maintain the large lead that his teammate Richards built up throughout the race despite choosing to not change to wet tyres on the rain drenched track, until he ran off at The Chase, nearly rolling the car in the gravel trap, which relinquished his lead to Lowndes, with Johnson, Murphy and Courtney all passing him as a consequence. The incident damaged Winterbottom's steering, costing him a chance to podium as a result. The moment is considered to be one of the most iconic moments of Bathurst, with critics calling the incident "one of the biggest chokes in Bathurst history".

In the final laps, Craig Lowndes, Steven Johnson, Greg Murphy and James Courtney were fighting for the win. Johnson passed Lowndes and held the lead. Courtney passed Murphy for third and Simonsen (5th) attempted an outside pass up Mountain Straight, but did not pull it off. One lap later, Lowndes passed Johnson at Hell Corner, pushing them both slightly wide, allowing Courtney to get past Johnson for second. They stayed that way right up until the chequered flag. Lowndes had won his third Bathurst 1000, Whincup had won his second and Ford had won their second consecutive win. Greg Murphy was the best placed Holden, coming in fourth, after being passed by Courtney on Lap 148. It was also the first time that Ford swept the podium at Bathurst since 1988. The final hour was considered to be one of the best finishes in Bathurst 1000 history until 2014, when the race win was determined by a last lap pass.

== Results ==
=== Qualifying ===
Pos	No	Name	Car	Team	Part 2	Part 1
1	6	(Australia) Mark Winterbottom (New Zealand) Steven Richards	Ford BF Falcon	Ford Performance Racing	2:07.1481	
2	2	(Australia) Mark Skaife (Australia) Todd Kelly	Holden VE Commodore	Holden Racing Team	2:07.4512	
3	1	(Australia) Garth Tander (Australia) Rick Kelly	Holden VE Commodore	Toll HSV Dealer Team	2:07.3856	
4	888	(Australia) Craig Lowndes (Australia) Jamie Whincup	Ford BF Falcon	Team Vodafone	2:07.6214	
5	4	(Australia) James Courtney (Australia) David Besnard	Ford BF Falcon	Jeld-Wen Racing	2:07.9036	
6	9	(Australia) Russell Ingall (Australia) Luke Youlden	Ford BF Falcon	Caltex Havoline Racing	2:07.9066	
7	51	(New Zealand) Greg Murphy (New Zealand) Jason Richards	Holden VE Commodore	Tasman Motorsport	2:08.0331	
8	17	(Australia) Steven Johnson (Australia) Will Davison	Ford BF Falcon	Jim Beam Racing	2:08.0881	
9	33	(Australia) Lee Holdsworth (Australia) Dean Canto	Holden VE Commodore	Garry Rogers Motorsport	2:08.2545	
10	16	(New Zealand) Paul Radisich (New Zealand) Craig Baird	Holden VE Commodore	Toll HSV Dealer Team	2:08.3500	
11	34	(Australia) Greg Ritter (Australia) Cameron McLean	Holden VE Commodore	Garry Rogers Motorsport	2:08.4006	
12	25	(Australia) Jason Bright (Australia) Adam Macrow	Ford BF Falcon	Britek Motorsport	2:08.6625	
13	12	(Australia) Andrew Jones (New Zealand) Simon Wills	Ford BF Falcon	Team BOC	2:08.9001	
14	88	(United Kingdom) Richard Lyons (Denmark) Allan Simonsen	Ford BF Falcon	Team Vodafone	2:08.9718	
15	11	(Australia) Marcus Marshall (New Zealand) Kayne Scott	Holden VE Commodore	Jack Daniel's Racing	2:08.9984	
16	50	(Australia) Cameron McConville (Australia) David Reynolds	Holden VE Commodore	Supercheap Auto Racing	2:09.0878	
17	3	(Australia) Mark Noske (Australia) Jay Verdnik	Holden VE Commodore	Tasman Motorsport	2:11.2633	
18	18	(Australia) Alex Davison (Australia) Andrew Thompson	Ford BF Falcon	Jim Beam Racing	Excluded	
19	8	(Australia) Jason Bargwanna (Brazil) Max Wilson	Ford BF Falcon	WPS Racing		2:09.5378
20	26	(Australia) Warren Luff (Australia) Alan Gurr	Ford BF Falcon	Britek Motorsport		2:09.7122
21	5	(Australia) Owen Kelly (New Zealand) Matt Halliday	Ford BF Falcon	Ford Performance Racing		2:09.8141
22	111	(Australia) John Bowe (Australia) Jonathon Webb	Ford BF Falcon	Paul Cruickshank Racing		2:09.8464
23	7	(Australia) Shane Price (Australia) Jack Perkins	Holden VE Commodore	Jack Daniel's Racing		2:10.0196
24	67	(Australia) Paul Morris (Australia) Steve Ellery	Holden VE Commodore	Team Sirromet Wines		2:10.0945
25	39	(New Zealand) Fabian Coulthard (New Zealand) Chris Pither	Holden VZ Commodore	Team Sirromet Wines		2:10.3498
26	021	(New Zealand) Shane van Gisbergen (New Zealand) John McIntyre	Ford BF Falcon	Team Kiwi Racing		2:10.4038
27	14	(Australia) Damien White (Singapore) Christian Murchison	Ford BF Falcon	Team BOC		2:11.2080
28	10	(Australia) Michael Caruso (Australia) Grant Denyer	Ford BF Falcon	WPS Racing		2:11.5360
29	22	(Australia) Glenn Seton (Australia) Nathan Pretty	Holden VE Commodore	Holden Racing Team	Excluded	Excluded
30	20	(Australia) Paul Dumbrell (Australia) Paul Weel	Holden VE Commodore	Supercheap Auto Racing	Excluded	Excluded
31	55	(Australia) Steve Owen (Australia) Tony D'Alberto	Holden VZ Commodore	Autobarn Racing		Excluded

=== Top ten shootout ===
Pos	No	Driver	Team	Time
Pole	6	(Australia) Mark Winterbottom	Ford Performance Racing	2:07.0908
2	2	(Australia) Mark Skaife	Holden Racing Team	2:07.1961
3	1	(Australia) Garth Tander	Toll HSV Dealer Team	2:07.2871
4	17	(Australia) Steven Johnson	Jim Beam Racing	2:08.0782
5	33	(Australia) Lee Holdsworth	Garry Rogers Motorsport	2:08.1812
6	888	(Australia) Craig Lowndes	Team Vodafone	2:08.2449
7	51	(New Zealand) Greg Murphy	Tasman Motorsport	2:08.3672
8	4	(Australia) James Courtney	Jeld-Wen Racing	2:08.3911
9	16	(New Zealand) Paul Radisich	Toll HSV Dealer Team	2:08.4909
10	9	(Australia) Russell Ingall	Caltex Havoline Racing	2:19.5966

=== Starting grid ===
The following table represents the final starting grid for the race on Sunday:

Inside row			Outside row		
1	(Australia) Mark Winterbottom (New Zealand) Steven Richards	6	2	(Australia) Mark Skaife (Australia) Todd Kelly	2
1	Ford Performance Racing (Ford Falcon BF)		Holden Racing Team (Holden Commodore VE)		2
3	(Australia) Garth Tander (Australia) Rick Kelly	1	17	(Australia) Steven Johnson (Australia) Will Davison	4
3	HSV Dealer Team (Holden Commodore VE)		Dick Johnson Racing (Ford Falcon BF)		4
5	(Australia) Lee Holdsworth (Australia) Dean Canto	33	888	(Australia) Craig Lowndes (Australia) Jamie Whincup	6
5	Garry Rogers Motorsport (Holden Commodore VE)		Triple Eight Race Engineering (Ford Falcon BF)		6
7	(New Zealand) Greg Murphy (New Zealand) Jason Richards	51	4	(Australia) James Courtney (Australia) David Besnard	8
7	Tasman Motorsport (Holden Commodore VE)		Stone Brothers Racing (Ford Falcon BF)		8
9	(New Zealand) Paul Radisich (New Zealand) Craig Baird	16	9	(Australia) Russell Ingall (Australia) Luke Youlden	10
9	HSV Dealer Team (Holden Commodore VE)		Stone Brothers Racing (Ford Falcon BF)		10
11	(Australia) Greg Ritter (Australia) Cameron McLean	34	25	(Australia) Jason Bright (Australia) Adam Macrow	12
11	Garry Rogers Motorsport (Holden Commodore VE)		Britek Motorsport (Ford Falcon BF)		12
13	(Australia) Andrew Jones (New Zealand) Simon Wills	12	88	(United Kingdom) Richard Lyons (Denmark) Allan Simonsen	14
13	Brad Jones Racing (Ford Falcon BF)		Triple Eight Race Engineering (Ford Falcon BF)		14
15	(Australia) Marcus Marshall (New Zealand) Kayne Scott	11	50	(Australia) Cameron McConville (Australia) David Reynolds	16
15	Perkins Engineering (Holden Commodore VE)		Paul Weel Racing (Holden Commodore VE)		16
17	(Australia) Mark Noske (Australia) Jay Verdnik	3	18	(Australia) Alex Davison (Australia) Andrew Thompson	18
17	Tasman Motorsport (Holden Commodore VE)		Dick Johnson Racing (Ford Falcon BF)		18
19	(Australia) Jason Bargwanna (Brazil) Max Wilson	8	26	(Australia) Alan Gurr (Australia) Warren Luff	20
19	WPS Racing (Ford Falcon BF)		Britek Motorsport (Ford Falcon BF)		20
21	(Australia) Owen Kelly (New Zealand) Matthew Halliday	5	111	(Australia) John Bowe (Australia) Jonathon Webb	22
21	Ford Performance Racing (Ford Falcon BF)		Paul Cruickshank Racing (Ford Falcon BF)		22
23	(Australia) Jack Perkins (Australia) Shane Price	7	67	(Australia) Paul Morris (Australia) Steve Ellery	24
23	Perkins Engineering (Holden Commodore VE)		Paul Morris Motorsport (Holden Commodore VE)		24
25	(New Zealand) Fabian Coulthard (New Zealand) Chris Pither	39	021	(New Zealand) John McIntyre (New Zealand) Shane van Gisbergen	26
25	Paul Morris Motorsport (Holden Commodore VZ)		Team Kiwi Racing (Ford Falcon BF)		26
27	(Australia) Michael Caruso (Australia) Grant Denyer	10	22	(Australia) Glenn Seton (Australia) Nathan Pretty	28
27	WPS Racing (Ford Falcon BF)		Holden Racing Team (Holden Commodore VE)		28
29	(Australia) Paul Dumbrell (Australia) Paul Weel	20	55	(Australia) Steve Owen (Australia) Tony D'Alberto	30
29	Paul Weel Racing (Holden Commodore VE)		Rod Nash Racing (Holden Commodore VZ)		30

The #14 suffered a terminal crash in qualifying leaving the grid at 30 entries.

=== Race results ===
Pos	No	Name	Team	Car	Laps	Time/Retired	Grid	Points
1	888	(Australia) Craig Lowndes (Australia) Jamie Whincup	Triple Eight Race Engineering	Ford Falcon BF	161	6:29:10.1985	6th	72
2	4	(Australia) James Courtney (Australia) David Besnard	Stone Brothers Racing	Ford Falcon BF	161	+0.6238	8th	60
3	17	(Australia) Steven Johnson (Australia) Will Davison	Dick Johnson Racing	Ford Falcon BF	161	+0.8160	4th	51
4	51	(New Zealand) Greg Murphy (New Zealand) Jason Richards	Tasman Motorsport	Holden Commodore VE	161	+1.1712	7th	45
5	88	(United Kingdom) Richard Lyons (Denmark) Allan Simonsen	Triple Eight Race Engineering	Ford Falcon BF	161	+8.3128	14th	39
6	55	(Australia) Steve Owen (Australia) Tony D'Alberto	Rod Nash Racing	Holden Commodore VZ	161	+9.3294	Excluded	36
7	8	(Australia) Jason Bargwanna (Brazil) Max Wilson	WPS Racing	Ford Falcon BF	161	+11.8338	19th	33
8	18	(Australia) Alex Davison (Australia) Andrew Thompson	Dick Johnson Racing	Ford Falcon BF	161	+14.6462	18th	30
9	34	(Australia) Greg Ritter (Australia) Cameron McLean	Garry Rogers Motorsport	Holden Commodore VE	161	+17.8800	11th	27
10	6	(Australia) Mark Winterbottom (New Zealand) Steven Richards	Ford Performance Racing	Ford Falcon BF	161	+18.3579	1st	24
11	22	(Australia) Glenn Seton (Australia) Nathan Pretty	Holden Racing Team	Holden Commodore VE	161	+28.3388	Excluded	18
12	20	(Australia) Paul Dumbrell (Australia) Paul Weel	Paul Weel Racing	Holden Commodore VE	161	+31.7890	Excluded	15
13	5	(Australia) Owen Kelly (New Zealand) Matt Halliday	Ford Performance Racing	Ford Falcon BF	161	+1:15.1621	21st	12
14	111	(Australia) Jonathon Webb (Australia) John Bowe	Paul Cruickshank Racing	Ford Falcon BF	160	+1 lap	22nd	9
15	10	(Australia) Michael Caruso (Australia) Grant Denyer	WPS Racing	Ford Falcon BF	159	+2 laps	27th	6
16	39	(New Zealand) Fabian Coulthard (New Zealand) Chris Pither	Paul Morris Motorsport	Holden Commodore VZ	159	+2 laps	25th	
DNF	9	(Australia) Russell Ingall (Australia) Luke Youlden	Stone Brothers Racing	Ford Falcon BF	149	Crash	10th	
DNF	25	(Australia) Jason Bright (Australia) Adam Macrow	Britek Motorsport	Ford Falcon BF	149	Crash	12th	
DNF	2	(Australia) Mark Skaife (Australia) Todd Kelly	Holden Racing Team	Holden Commodore VE	149	Crash	2nd	
DNF	021	(New Zealand) Shane van Gisbergen (New Zealand) John McIntyre	Team Kiwi Racing	Ford Falcon BF	148	Spun off	26th	
DNF	67	(Australia) Paul Morris (Australia) Steve Ellery	Paul Morris Motorsport	Holden Commodore VE	145	Crash	24th	
DNF	3	(Australia) Mark Noske (Australia) Jay Verdnik	Tasman Motorsport	Holden Commodore VE	138	Crash	17th	
DNF	16	(New Zealand) Paul Radisich (New Zealand) Craig Baird	HSV Dealer Team	Holden Commodore VE	137	Brakes	9th	
DNF	1	(Australia) Garth Tander (Australia) Rick Kelly	HSV Dealer Team	Holden Commodore VE	134	Brakes	3rd	
DNF	26	(Australia) Warren Luff (Australia) Alan Gurr	Britek Motorsport	Ford Falcon BF	134	Crash	20th	
DNF	33	(Australia) Lee Holdsworth (Australia) Dean Canto	Garry Rogers Motorsport	Holden Commodore VE	118	Crash	5th	
DNF	7	(Australia) Shane Price (Australia) Jack Perkins	Perkins Engineering	Holden Commodore VE	102	Fire	23rd	
DNF	11	(Australia) Marcus Marshall (New Zealand) Kayne Scott	Perkins Engineering	Holden Commodore VE	91	Crash	15th	
DNF	12	(Australia) Andrew Jones (New Zealand) Simon Wills	Brad Jones Racing	Ford Falcon BF	52	Fire	13th	
DNS	50	(Australia) Cameron McConville (Australia) David Reynolds	Paul Weel Racing	Holden Commodore VE	0	Engine	16th	
DNS	14	(Australia) Damien White (Singapore) Christian Murchison	Brad Jones Racing	Ford Falcon BF	0	Qualifying crash		

== Statistics ==
- Pole position - #6 Mark Winterbottom - 2:07.0908
- Fastest lap - #888 Jamie Whincup - 2:08.4651 (new lap record)
- Average Race Speed - 154 km/h
- 7 Safety Car periods for a total of 13 Laps

== Broadcast ==
For the first time since the 1998 Super Touring race, the Seven Network broadcast the Bathurst 1000 to the Australian audience.

Seven Network
Booth: Neil Crompton, Luke West (ad-breaks), Matthew White
Pit-lane: Mark Beretta, Daniel Gibson, Aaron Noonan
