= Andrew Jones (racing driver) =

Australian racing driver (born 1980)

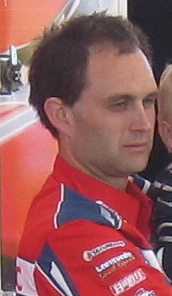
- Jones in 2011
- Nationality: Australian
- Born: 24 June 1980 (age 46) Albury, New South Wales
- Categorisation: FIA Silver

Supercars Championship career
- Championships: 0
- Races: 165
- Wins: 0
- Podiums: 1
- Pole positions: 0

Andrew Jones (born 24 June 1980) is an Australian former racing driver who previously competed in the Supercars Championship and Dunlop Super2 Series, driving with family-owned team Brad Jones Racing for majority of his career.

Jones has had success in a number of forms of motorsport in Australia. In 2004, he won the Konica Minolta V8 Supercar Series, the second tier series, and went on to secure a drive with Garry Rogers Motorsport in the 2005 V8 Supercar Championship Series. In 2006, he joined Tasman Motorsport, replacing Jamie Whincup but had a frustrating and disappointing year. It was announced that he was moving back to Albury to re-join his uncle Brad and father Kim's team, Brad Jones Racing, replacing John Bowe at the start of the 2007 season.

Jones currently manages the SCT Motorsport program. His cousin Macauley Jones also races.

== Career results ==
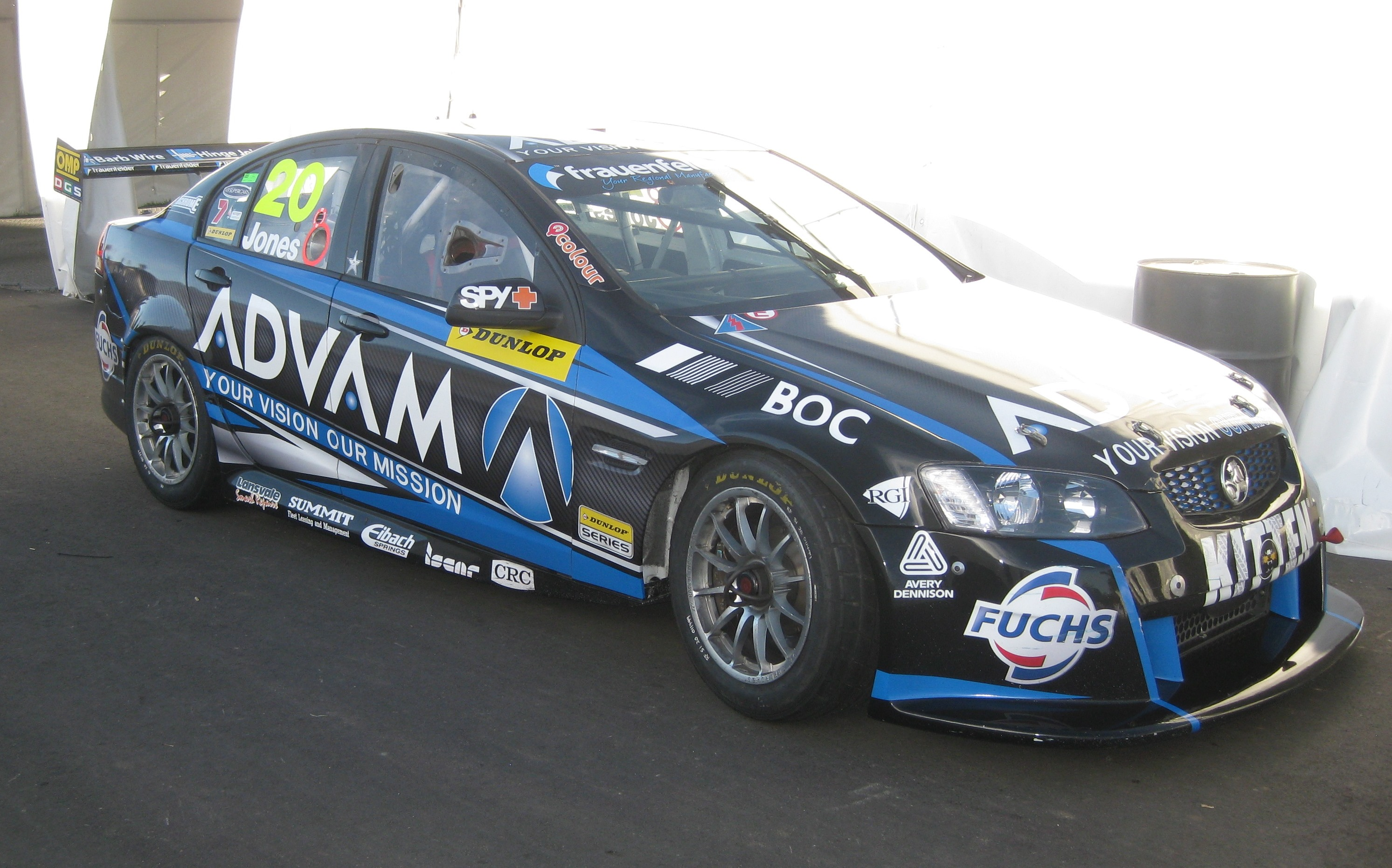
Jones contested the 2013 Dunlop Series in a Brad Jones Racing Holden VE Commodore

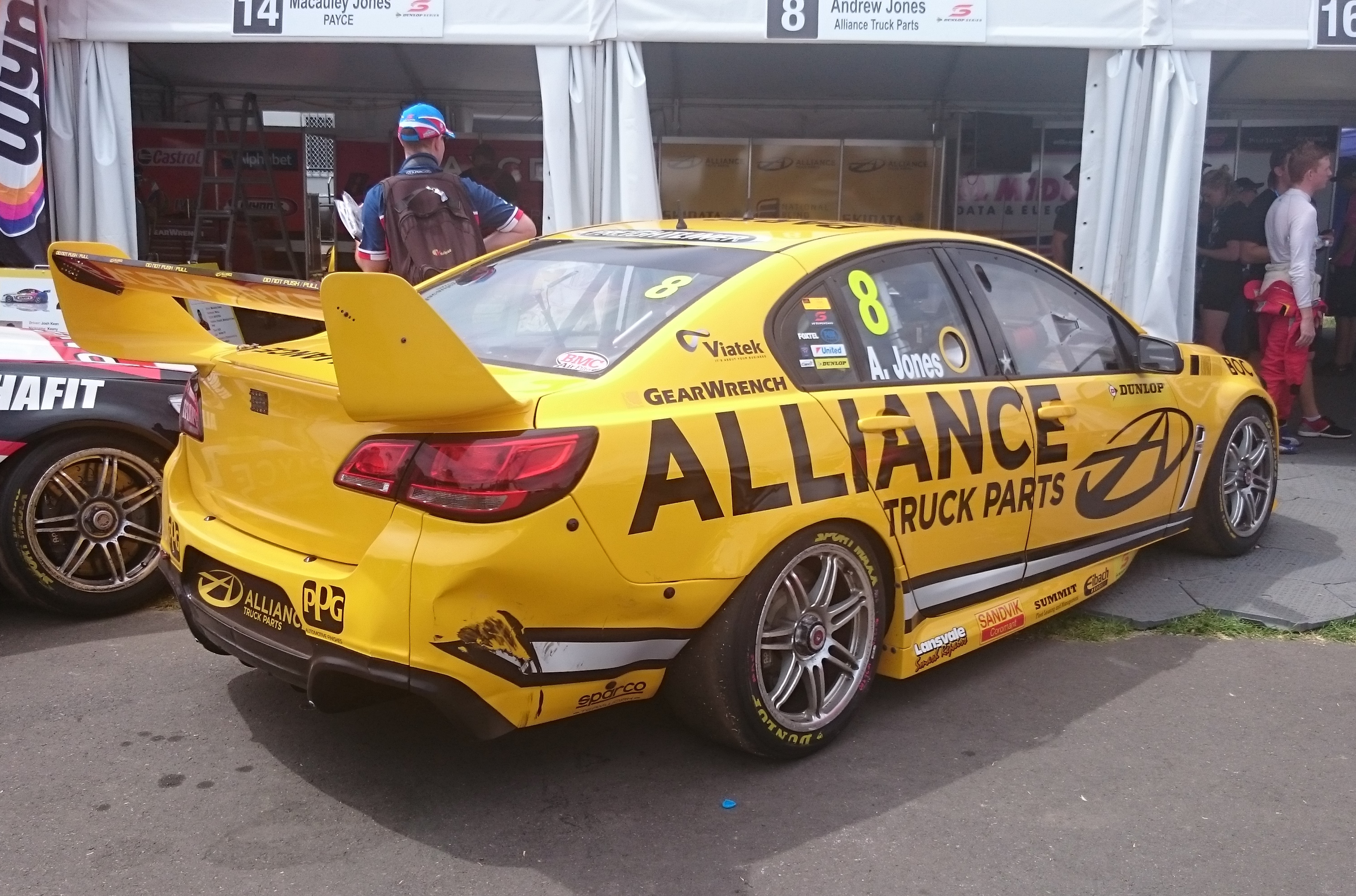
Jones' Brad Jones Racing Holden VF Commodore in which he contested the 2016 Dunlop Series

Season	Series	Position	Car	Team
2001	Australian Formula Ford Championship	6th	Van Diemen RF94 Ford	Ozemail Racing
2002	Australian Formula Ford Championship	6th	Van Diemen RF02 Ford	Ozemail Racing
2002	Konica V8 Supercar Series	29th	Ford AU Falcon	Brad Jones Racing
2003	Konica V8 Supercar Series	11th	Ford AU Falcon	Brad Jones Racing
2003	V8 Supercar Championship Series	41st	Ford BA Falcon	Brad Jones Racing
2004	Konica Minolta V8 Supercar Series	**1st**	Ford AU Falcon	Brad Jones Racing
2005	V8 Supercar Championship Series	28th	Holden VZ Commodore	Garry Rogers Motorsport
2006	V8 Supercar Championship Series	26th	Holden VZ Commodore	Tasman Motorsport
2007	V8 Supercar Championship Series	44th	Ford BF Falcon	Brad Jones Racing
2008	V8 Supercar Championship Series	24th	Holden VE Commodore	Brad Jones Racing
2009	V8 Supercar Championship Series	57th	Holden VE Commodore	Brad Jones Racing
2010	V8 Supercar Championship Series	36th	Holden VE Commodore	Brad Jones Racing
2011	International V8 Supercars Championship	33rd	Holden VE Commodore	Brad Jones Racing
2011	Fujitsu V8 Supercars Series	21st	Holden VE Commodore	Brad Jones Racing
2012	Dunlop V8 Supercar Series	10th	Holden VE Commodore	Brad Jones Racing
2012	International V8 Supercars Championship	43rd	Holden VE Commodore	Brad Jones Racing
2013	Dunlop V8 Supercar Series	**3rd**	Holden VE Commodore	Brad Jones Racing
2013	International V8 Supercars Championship	46th	Holden VF Commodore	Brad Jones Racing
2014	International V8 Supercars Championship	45th	Holden VF Commodore	Brad Jones Racing
2015	V8 Supercars Dunlop Series	7th	Holden VE Commodore	Brad Jones Racing
2015	International V8 Supercars Championship	44th	Holden VF Commodore	Brad Jones Racing
2016	Supercars Dunlop Series	6th	Holden VF Commodore	Brad Jones Racing
2016	International V8 Supercars Championship	51st	Holden VF Commodore	Brad Jones Racing
2017	Dunlop Super2 Series	12th	Holden VF Commodore	Brad Jones Racing

=== Complete Super2 Series results ===
(key) (Races in bold indicate pole position) (Races in italics indicate fastest lap)

Year	Team	Car	1	2	3	4	5	6	7	8	9	10	11	12	13	14	15	16	17	18	19	20	21	Position	Points
2002	Brad Jones Racing	Ford AU Falcon	WAK	WAK	WAK	PHI	PHI	PHI	ORA	ORA	ORA	WIN; 17	WIN; 9	WIN; 7	MAL	MAL	MAL							29th	83
2003	Brad Jones Racing	Ford AU Falcon	WAK; 6	WAK; 2	WAK; 9	ADE; 24	EAS	EAS	EAS	PHI; 2	PHI; 4	PHI; Ret	WIN; 1	WIN; 5	WIN; 1	MAL; 3	MAL; Ret	MAL; 4						11th	604
2004	Brad Jones Racing	Ford AU Falcon	WAK; 4	WAK; Ret	WAK; 1	ADE; 2	ADE; Ret	WIN; 1	WIN; 7	WIN; 3	EAS; 2	EAS; 2	EAS; 2	QLD; 2	QLD; 3	QLD; 2	MAL; 2	MAL; 3	MAL; 2					**1st**	**945**
2011	Brad Jones Racing	Holden VE Commodore	ADE	ADE	BAR	BAR	TOW; 15	TOW; 8	TOW; 10	QLD; 9	QLD; 1	**QLD**; **10**	BAT	BAT	SAN	SAN	SAN	HOM; 8	HOM; 13					21st	466
2012	Brad Jones Racing	Holden VE Commodore	ADE; 14	ADE; 6	BAR; 7	BAR; Ret	BAR; DNS	TOW; 9	TOW; 4	TOW; Ret	QLD; 10	QLD; 8	QLD; 8	BAT; 18	BAT; 9	WIN; 7	WIN; 16	WIN; Ret	HOM; 4	HOM; 6				10th	983
2013	Brad Jones Racing	Holden VE Commodore	ADE; 4	ADE; 25	BAR; 8	BAR; 3	BAR; 15	TOW; 6	TOW; 3	TOW; 3	QLD; 7	QLD; 28	QLD; 4	WIN; 3	WIN; 6	WIN; 3	BAT; 5	BAT; 7	HOM; 5	HOM; 4				**3rd**	**1425**
2014	Brad Jones Racing	Holden VE Commodore	ADE; 8	ADE; 3	WIN; 4	WIN; 6	BAR; 23	BAR; 6	TOW; Ret	TOW; Ret	QLD; 3	QLD; 11	BAT; 4	HOM; 6	HOM; 3									6th	1226
2015	Brad Jones Racing	Holden VE Commodore	ADE; 8	ADE; 4	BAR; Ret	BAR; Ret	BAR; 2	WIN; 2	WIN; 2	WIN; 2	TOW; DNS	TOW; DNS	QLD; 4	QLD; 2	QLD; 6	BAT; 4	HOM; 6	HOM; 4						7th	1274
2016	Brad Jones Racing	Holden VF Commodore	ADE; 2	ADE; 19	PHI; 5	PHI; 3	PHI; 3	**BAR**; **2**	BAR; 17	BAR; 6	TOW; 7	TOW; 15	SAN; 10	SAN; Ret	SAN; 12	BAT; 8	HOM; 8	HOM; 6						6th	1254
2017	Brad Jones Racing	Holden VF Commodore	ADE; 7	ADE; 5	ADE; 5	SYM; 11	SYM; 14	SYM; 10	SYM; 6	PHI; 17	PHI; 14	PHI; 13	PHI; 12	TOW; Ret	TOW; Ret	SMP; 8	SMP; 15	SMP; 12	SMP; 12	SAN; 10	SAN; 12	NEW; 10	NEW; 9	12th	946

=== Complete Bathurst 1000 results ===
Year	Team	Car	Co-driver	Position	Laps
2002	Brad Jones Racing	Ford AU Falcon	(Australia) Matthew Coleman	DNF	14
2003	Brad Jones Racing	Ford BA Falcon	(United Kingdom) John Cleland	9th	160
2004	Brad Jones Racing	Ford BA Falcon	(United Kingdom) John Cleland	DNF	29
2005	Garry Rogers Motorsport	Holden VZ Commodore	(Australia) Cameron McConville	4th	161
2006	Tasman Motorsport	Holden VZ Commodore	(New Zealand) Jason Richards	DNF	151
2007	Brad Jones Racing	Ford BF Falcon	(New Zealand) Simon Wills	DNF	52
2008	Brad Jones Racing	Holden VE Commodore	(Australia) Cameron McConville	DNF	40
2009	Brad Jones Racing	Holden VE Commodore	(Australia) Brad Jones	23rd	145
2010	Brad Jones Racing	Holden VE Commodore	(New Zealand) Jason Richards	23rd	157
2011	Brad Jones Racing	Holden VE Commodore	(Australia) Jason Bright	5th	161
2012	Brad Jones Racing	Holden VE Commodore	(Australia) Jason Bright	21st	153
2013	Brad Jones Racing	Holden VF Commodore	(Australia) Jason Bright	5th	161
2014	Brad Jones Racing	Holden VF Commodore	(Australia) Jason Bright	14th	158
2015	Brad Jones Racing	Holden VF Commodore	(Australia) Jason Bright	7th	161
2016	Brad Jones Racing	Holden VF Commodore	(Australia) Jason Bright	DNF	89

=== Complete Bathurst 12 Hour results ===
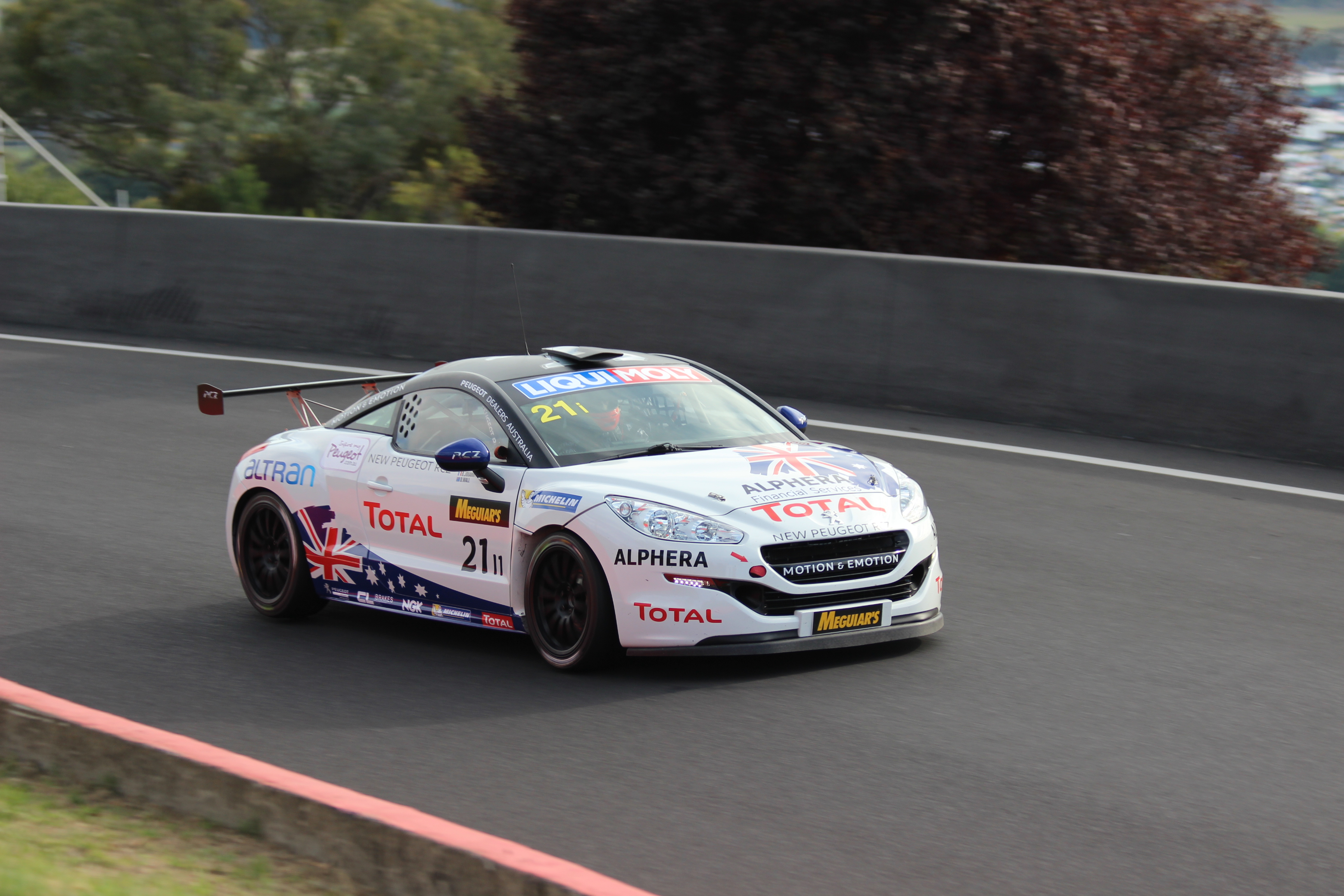
The Class I1-winning Peugeot RCZ Cup of Andrew Jones, Bruce Jouanny and David Wall.

Year	Team	Co-drivers	Car	Class	Laps	Overall position	Class position
2009	(Australia) Holden Motorsport	(Australia) Nathan Pretty (Australia) Russell Ingall	HSV E Series Clubsport R8 Tourer	A	223	15th	6th
2010	(Australia) Menray Race Engineering	(Australia) Cameron McConville (Australia) Nathan Pretty	HSV Clubsport R8 Tourer	B	201	**3rd**	**2nd**
2013	(Australia) Team Peugeot RCZ	(France) Bruce Jouanny (Australia) David Wall	Peugeot RCZ Cup	I1	233	16th	**1st**

Sporting positions
Preceded by Mark Winterbottom	Winner of the Konica Minolta V8 Supercar Series; 2004	Succeeded by Dean Canto
