= Hidden Valley Raceway =

Motorsport track in Australia

- Full Circuit (1986–present)
- Location: Darwin, Northern Territory
- Coordinates: 12°26′57″S 130°54′25″E
- FIA Grade: 3
- Opened: 1986
- Major events: Current: Supercars Championship; Darwin Triple Crown (1998–present); FIM MXGP (2025–present); Trans-Am Australia (2025–present); GT World Challenge Australia (2026); Former: Touring Car Masters (2008–2018, 2024–2025); Australian Improved Production Nationals (2015, 2024); Australian SBK (1998, 2010–2013, 2017–2018, 2021–2023); S5000 (2022); Stadium Super Trucks (2017, 2021)

Full Circuit (1986–present)
- Length: 2.870 km (1.783 mi)
- Turns: 14
- Race lap record: 1:02.9268 ( (New Zealand) Simon Wills, Reynard 94D, 2001, Formula Holden)

Hidden Valley Raceway is part of the Hidden Valley Motorsports Complex, located at 171 Hidden Valley Road, Hidden Valley, 10 km (6.2 mi) from Darwin, Northern Territory, Australia. The Hidden Valley Motorsports Complex includes a 1 km drag racing track (which runs alongside the main straight of the raceway circuit), the 400 m (440 yd) long Northline Speedway, a dirt track speedway, motocross tracks and a go-kart circuit. Hidden Valley Raceway holds an annual round of the International V8 Supercars Championship.

== The circuit ==
Hidden Valley Raceway is known for its high speeds and fast lap times. It is 2.870 km (1.783 mi) long and has 14 corners, with a main straight 1.1 km (0.68 mi) in length. In order to win, the race car has to flow well through the sweeping bends and also needs top end horse power for the main straight.

In 2021, AIDRA announced the establishment of an annual Australian Drag Racing Championship series, with ASID as one of five venues across the country to host a round in the inaugural season.

== Events ==
Current

- June: Supercars Championship Darwin Triple Crown, Australian National Trans-Am Series, Porsche Carrera Cup Australia, Super2 Series
- July: GT World Challenge Australia GT Festival Darwin, GT4 Australia Series, Mustang Cup Australia
- September: Motocross World Championship MXGP of Australia

Former

- Aussie Racing Cars (2006, 2010, 2015–2016, 2019, 2023)
- Australian Drivers' Championship (2001–2002, 2011–2014)
- Australian Formula Ford Championship (2008–2010)
- Australian GT Production Car Championship (1999)
- Australian Improved Production Nationals (2015, 2024)
- Australian Superbike Championship (1998, 2010–2013, 2017–2018, 2021–2023)
- S5000 Australian Drivers' Championship (2022)
- Stadium Super Trucks (2017, 2021)
- SuperUtes Series (2024)
- Touring Car Masters (2008–2018, 2024–2025)
- V8 Ute Racing Series (2005–2015)

== Supercars ==
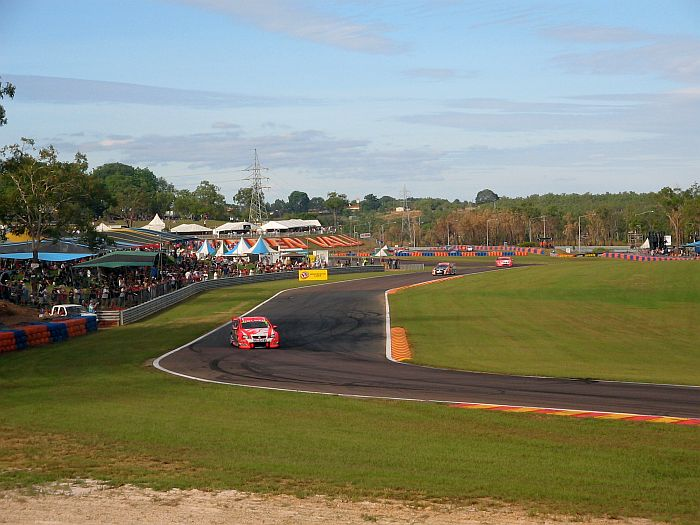
Mark Skaife in action at the 2007 V8 Supercar event at Hidden Valley Raceway

V8 Supercars races have been held at Hidden Valley Raceway since 1998, with the first event occurring in July that year. The event is usually held in late June or early July as the temperature is cooler and it is in the 'dry season'. The event is currently called the CrownBet Darwin Triple Crown, with the 'Triple Crown' awarded to the driver who is fastest in the top ten shootout and wins both races. The 2008 event was voted as the V8 Supercar Event of the Year.

== Lap records ==
As of July 2026, the fastest official race lap records at Hidden Valley Raceway are listed as:

Class	Time	Driver	Vehicle	Date
Full Circuit (1986–present): 2.870 km (1.783 mi)
Formula Holden	1:02.9268	(New Zealand) Simon Wills	Reynard 94D	13 May 2001
S5000	1:03.4504	(Australia) Cooper Webster	Ligier JS F3-S5000	18 June 2022
GT3	1:04.8293	(Australia) Josh Buchan	Ferrari 296 GT3	26 July 2026
Formula Three	1:05.1101	(Australia) Simon Hodge	Mygale M11	22 June 2014
Superbike	1:05.1780	(Australia) Josh Waters	Ducati Panigale V4 R	18 June 2023
Supercars Championship	1:06.5590	(Australia) Nick Percat	Holden ZB Commodore	17 June 2018
Porsche Carrera Cup	1:07.1591	(Australia) Clay Osborne	Porsche 911 (992 II) GT3 Cup	21 June 2026
Supersport	1:08.243	(Australia) Cru Halliday	Yamaha YZF-R6	1 July 2018
Super2	1:09.0582	(Australia) Lochie Dalton	Ford Mustang GT	21 June 2026
Trans-Am Australia	1:09.4673	(Australia) Jarrod Hughes	Chevrolet Camaro	19 June 2026
GT4	1:10.5522	(Australia) Jobe Stewart	Audi R8 LMS GT4 Evo	26 July 2026
Improved Production	1:11.7682	(Australia) Adam Poole	Holden Monaro	21 July 2024
Mustang Cup	1:12.3415	(Australia) Bryce Fullwood	Ford Mustang Dark Horse R	26 July 2026
Touring Car Masters	1:12.3787	(Australia) Steven Johnson	Ford Mustang Trans-Am	15 June 2024
Formula Ford	1:12.9052	(Australia) Ryan Simpson	Spectrum 011c	19 June 2009
Combined Sedans	1:13.8122	(Australia) Justin Keys	Holden Commodore VS	19 June 2022
Moto3	1:14.257	(Australia) Joel Kelso	Honda NSF250R	9 July 2017
Aussie Racing Cars	1:17.0923	(Australia) Joel Heinrich	Ford Mustang-Yamaha	17 June 2023
Commodore Cup	1:17.8781	(Australia) Bryce Fullwood	Holden VH Commodore	18 June 2016
Supersport 300	1:18.479	(Australia) Hunter Ford	Yamaha YZF-R6	30 June 2018
SuperUtes Series	1:18.9842	(Australia) Adam Marjoram	Isuzu D-Max	15 June 2024
V8 Ute Racing Series	1:19.5543	(Australia) George Miedecke	Ford FG Falcon Ute	20 June 2015
Excel Racing Series	1:28.1850	(Australia) Noah Grosser	Hyundai Excel	22 June 2025
HQ Holdens	1:30.8852	(Australia) Jake Madden	Holden HQ	10 July 2022
Stadium Super Trucks	1:32.7015	(United States) Robby Gordon	Stadium Super Truck	14 June 2017
