= Akihiro Asai =

Japanese race car driver

Akihiro Asai (born September 13, 1975) is a Japanese race car driver. He started open-wheel racing in 1994. He won both the East & West Japanese Formula 4 titles in 1997. Asai also competed in Formula Holden Australian Driver's Championship (1998–1999, 2002) and CART Toyota Atlantic (2000). Asai started entering GT car racing in 2003 from Team Taisan in the Japanese GT Championship. He competed in the Japanese GT Championship and Super GT in 2004, 2005 and 2010. He also raced in the 2005 Super Taikyu Series championship. From 2010, he started to participate racing in south east Asia region and in 2011 won the Supercar Thailand N.A. class Championship. Asai races widely in GT Asia, Asian Le Mans Series, Thailand Super Series.

== Racing record ==
=== Complete Super GT results ===
Year	Team	Car	Class	1	2	3	4	5	6	7	8	DC	Pts
2003	Team Taisan	Porsche 911 GT3R	GT300	TAI; 1	FUJ; 11	SUG; 13	FUJ; 8	FUJ; 10	MOT; 18	AUT; 9	SUZ; 5	10th	38
2004	Team Taisan	Porsche 911 GT3R	GT300	TAI	SUG	SEP; 10	TOK	MOT	AUT	SUZ		22nd	1
2005	Teramoto	Porsche 911 GT3-RSR	GT300	OKA	FUJ	SEP	SUG; 13	MOT	FUJ	AUT	SUZ	NC	0
2010	LMP Motorsport	Ferrari F430 GTC	GT300	SUZ	OKA	FUJ	SEP	SUG	SUZ; 11	FUJ; C	MOT; 15	NC	0
