= 2004 V8 Supercar season =

Seasons
- ← 2003 2005 →

The 2004 V8 Supercar season was the 45th year of touring car racing in Australia since the first runnings of the Australian Touring Car Championship and the fore-runner of the present day Bathurst 1000.

There were 21 touring car race meetings held during 2004; a thirteen-round series for V8 Supercars, the 2004 V8 Supercar Championship Series (VCS), two of them endurance races; a six-round second tier V8 Supercar series 2004 Konica Minolta V8 Supercar Series (KvS) along with a non-point scoring race supporting the Bathurst 1000 and V8 Supercar support programme event at the 2004 Australian Grand Prix.

== Results and standings ==
=== Race calendar ===
The 2004 Australian touring car season consisted of 21 events.

| Date | Series | Circuit | City / state | Winner | Team | Car | Report |
|---|---|---|---|---|---|---|---|
| 22 Feb | KVS Round 1 | Wakefield Park | Goulburn, New South Wales | Alan Gurr | Robert Smith Racing | Holden VX Commodore | |
| 4–6 Mar | Netspace V8 Supercars | Albert Park street circuit | Melbourne, Victoria | Jason Bright | Paul Weel Racing | Holden VY Commodore | report |
| 19–20 Mar | KVS Round 2 | Adelaide Street Circuit | Adelaide, South Australia | Owen Kelly | Dick Johnson Racing | Ford AU Falcon | |
| 19–20 Mar | Clipsal 500 VCS Round 1 | Adelaide Street Circuit | Adelaide, South Australia | Marcos Ambrose | Stone Brothers Racing | Ford BA Falcon | |
| 3–4 Apr | VCS Round 2 | Eastern Creek Raceway | Sydney, New South Wales | Rick Kelly | K-Mart Racing Team | Holden VY Commodore | |
| 18 Apr | KVS Round 3 | Winton Motor Raceway | Benalla, Victoria | Andrew Jones | Brad Jones Racing | Ford AU Falcon | |
| 1–2 May | Placemakers V8 International VCS Round 3 | Pukekohe Park Raceway | Pukekohe, New Zealand | Jason Bright | Paul Weel Racing | Holden VY Commodore | |
| 22–23 May | VCS Round 4 | Hidden Valley Raceway | Darwin, Northern Territory | Todd Kelly | Holden Racing Team | Holden VY Commodore | |
| 30 May | KVS Round 4 | Eastern Creek Raceway | Sydney, New South Wales | Andrew Jones | Brad Jones Racing | Ford AU Falcon | |
| 12–13 Jun | VB 400 VCS Round 5 | Barbagallo Raceway | Perth, Western Australia | Jason Bright | Paul Weel Racing | Holden VY Commodore | |
| 3–4 Jul | KVS Round 5 | Queensland Raceway | Ipswich, Queensland | Owen Kelly | Dick Johnson Racing | Ford AU Falcon | |
| 3–4 Jul | VCS Round 6 | Queensland Raceway | Ipswich, Queensland | Marcos Ambrose | Stone Brothers Racing | Ford BA Falcon | |
| 24–25 Jul | VCS Round 7 | Winton Motor Raceway | Benalla, Victoria | Cameron McConville | Garry Rogers Motorsport | Holden VY Commodore | |
| 14–15 Aug | VCS Round 8 | Oran Park Raceway | Sydney, New South Wales | Marcos Ambrose | Stone Brothers Racing | Ford BA Falcon | |
| 22 Aug | KVS Round 6 | Mallala Motor Sport Park | Adelaide, South Australia | Greg Ritter | Speed FX Racing | Ford AU Falcon | |
| 11–12 Sep | Betta Electrical Sandown 500 VCS Round 9 | Sandown Raceway | Melbourne, Victoria | Marcos Ambrose; Greg Ritter | Stone Brothers Racing | Ford BA Falcon | report |
| 9–10 Oct | Konica Minolta V8Supercar Challenge | Mount Panorama Circuit | Bathurst, New South Wales | Matthew White | Matthew White Racing | Ford AU Falcon | report |
| 9–10 Oct | Bob Jane T-Marts 1000 VCS Round 10 | Mount Panorama Circuit | Bathurst, New South Wales | Greg Murphy; Rick Kelly | K-Mart Racing Team | Holden VY Commodore | report |
| 23–24 Oct | Gillette V8 Supercar Challenge VCS Round 11 | Surfers Paradise Street Circuit | Surfers Paradise, Queensland | Greg Murphy | K-Mart Racing Team | Holden VY Commodore | |
| 12–14 Nov | Falken Tasmania Challenge VCS Round 12 | Symmons Plains Raceway | Launceston, Tasmania | Russell Ingall | Stone Brothers Racing | Ford BA Falcon | |
| 4–5 Dec | BigPond Grand Finale VCS Round 13 | Eastern Creek Raceway | Sydney, New South Wales | Marcos Ambrose | Stone Brothers Racing | Ford BA Falcon | |

=== Netspace V8Supercars GP 100 ===
This meeting was a support event of the 2004 Australian Grand Prix.

| Driver | No. | Team | Car | Shootout | Race 1 | GP 100 | Race 3 | Points |
|---|---|---|---|---|---|---|---|---|
| (Australia) Jason Bright | 50 | Paul Weel Racing | Holden VY Commodore | 3 | 2 | 1 | 1 | 190 |
| (New Zealand) Steven Richards | 11 | Castrol Perkins Racing | Holden VY Commodore | 5 | 4 | 2 | 2 | 182 |
| (Australia) Garth Tander | 34 | Garry Rogers Motorsport | Holden VY Commodore | 6 | 3 | 4 | 3 | 182 |
| (New Zealand) Greg Murphy | 51 | K-Mart Racing Team | Holden VY Commodore | 1 | 1 | 3 | 4 | 178 |
| (Australia) Jason Bargwanna | 10 | Larkham Motor Sport | Ford BA Falcon | | 7 | 5 | 5 | 164 |
| (Australia) Todd Kelly | 22 | Holden Racing Team | Holden VY Commodore | 9 | 9 | 6 | 12 | 144 |
| (Australia) Steven Johnson | 17 | Dick Johnson Racing | Ford BA Falcon | | 13 | 9 | 7 | 140 |
| (Australia) Steve Ellery | 31 | Supercheap Auto Racing | Ford BA Falcon | | 12 | 10 | 9 | 136 |
| (Australia) Paul Morris | 29 | Paul Morris Motorsport | Holden VY Commodore | | 15 | 11 | 13 | 120 |
| (Australia) Marcos Ambrose | 1 | Stone Brothers Racing | Ford BA Falcon | 4 | 6 | DNF | 6 | 108 |
| (Australia) Paul Dumbrell | 8 | Castrol Perkins Racing | Holden VX Commodore | | 17 | 15 | 15 | 104 |
| (New Zealand) Simon Wills | 44 | Team Dynamik | Holden VY Commodore | 10 | 8 | 7 | DNF | 102 |
| (New Zealand) Jason Richards | 3 | Tasman Motorsports | Holden VX Commodore | | 20 | 18 | 14 | 94 |
| (Australia) Cameron McConville | 33 | Garry Rogers Motorsport | Holden VY Commodore | | 11 | 8 | DNF | 94 |
| (Australia) Paul Weel | 16 | Paul Weel Racing | Holden VY Commodore | | DNF | 12 | 8 | 92 |
| (Australia) Russell Ingall | 9 | Stone Brothers Racing | Ford BA Falcon | | DNF | 13 | 10 | 86 |
| (New Zealand) Paul Radisich | 88 | Triple Eight Race Engineering | Ford BA Falcon | 8 | 5 | DNF | 19 | 84 |
| (Australia) John Bowe | 12 | Brad Jones Racing | Ford BA Falcon | | 10 | DNF | 16 | 80 |
| (Australia) Warren Luff | 18 | Dick Johnson Racing | Ford BA Falcon | | 23 | 19 | 18 | 78 |
| (Australia) Craig Lowndes | 6 | Ford Performance Racing | Ford BA Falcon | | 19 | DNF | 11 | 72 |
| (Australia) Glenn Seton | 5 | Ford Performance Racing | Ford BA Falcon | | 18 | 21 | 24 | 72 |
| (Australia) Mark Skaife | 2 | Holden Racing Team | Holden VY Commodore | 2 | 16 | 14 | DNF | 72 |
| (Australia) Anthony Tratt | 75 | Paul Little Racing | Holden VY Commodore | | 14 | 20 | DNF | 64 |
| (Australia) Brad Jones | 21 | Brad Jones Racing | Ford BA Falcon | | DNF | 17 | 20 | 58 |
| (Australia) Tony Longhurst | 7 | Castrol Perkins Racing | Holden VY Commodore | | 21 | 16 | DNF | 58 |
| (Australia) Mark Winterbottom | 20 | Larkham Motor Sport | Ford BA Falcon | | 24 | DNF | 21 | 42 |
| (Brazil) Max Wilson | 77 | Triple Eight Race Engineering | Ford BA Falcon | | 22 | DNF | 23 | 42 |
| (Australia) Mark Noske | 23 | WPS Racing | Ford BA Falcon | | 26 | DNF | 22 | 36 |
| (New Zealand) Craig Baird | 14 | Team Kiwi Racing | Holden VY Commodore | | DNF | DNF | 17 | 32 |
| (Australia) Dale Brede | 45 | Team Dynamik | Holden VY Commodore | | 25 | DNF | DNS | 16 |
| (Australia) Rick Kelly | 15 | K-Mart Racing Team | Holden VY Commodore | 7 | DNF | DNS | DNS | |

=== Konica Minolta V8Supercar Challenge ===
This race was a support event of the 2004 Bob Jane T-Marts 1000.

| Driver | No. | Team | Car | Grid | Race |
|---|---|---|---|---|---|
| (Australia) Matthew White | 28 | Matthew White Racing | Ford AU Falcon | 3 | 1 |
| (Australia) Alan Gurr | 72 | Robert Smith Racing | Holden VX Commodore | 5 | 2 |
| (Australia) Tony D'Alberto | 83 | Howard Racing | Ford AU Falcon | 8 | 3 |
| (Australia) José Fernández | 81 | Dick Johnson Racing | Ford AU Falcon | 7 | 4 |
| (Australia) Tony Evangelou | 300 | ANT Racing | Ford AU Falcon | 9 | 5 |
| (Australia) Adam Wallis | 66 | Rod Lynch Motorsport | Ford AU Falcon | 12 | 6 |
| (Australia) Neil McFadyen | 76 | WPS Racing | Ford AU Falcon | 14 | 7 |
| (Australia) Jay Verdnik | 32 | Jay Motorsport | Holden VX Commodore | 15 | 8 |
| (Australia) Aaron McGill | 27 | Howard Racing | Ford AU Falcon | 19 | 9 |
| (Australia) Mark Howard | 37 | Howard Racing | Ford AU Falcon | 18 | 10 |
| (Australia) Robert Jones | 69 | Spiess Heckler Racing | Holden VX Commodore | 13 | 11 |
| (Australia) Marcus Zukanovic | 65 | Paul Cruikshank Racing | Ford AU Falcon | 11 | 12 |
| (Australia) Ben Eggleston | 38 | Eggleston Motorsport | Holden VX Commodore | 16 | 13 |
| (Australia) Greg Ritter | 60 | Speed FX Racing | Ford AU Falcon | 2 | DNF |
| (Australia) Gary MacDonald | 41 | Steven Ellery Racing | Ford AU Falcon | 6 | DNF |
| (Australia) Andrew Jones | 19 | Brad Jones Racing | Ford AU Falcon | 1 | DNF |
| (Australia) Gary Deane | 91 | Peters Motorsport | Ford AU Falcon | 20 | DNF |
| (Australia) David Brabham | 71 | Dick Johnson Racing | Ford AU Falcon | 4 | DNF |
| (Australia) Wayne Wakefield | 40 | Peters Motorsport | Ford AU Falcon | DNQ | DNF |
| (Australia) Kevin Mundy | 56 | Paul Cruickshank Racing | Ford AU Falcon | 10 | DNF |
| (Australia) Shane Price | 96 | Holden Young Lions | Holden VX Commodore | 23 | DNF |
| (Australia) Shane Beikoff | 68 | Beikoff Racing | Ford AU Falcon | 21 | DNF |
| (Australia) Mark Papendall | 55 | Rupprecht Motorsport | Holden VX Commodore | 22 | DNF |
| (Australia) Stephen Voight | 80 | Peters Motorsport | Ford AU Falcon | 17 | DNF |
| (Australia) Peter Doulman | 26 | M3 Motorsport | Holden VX Commodore | 24 | DNS |
| (Australia) Ray Ayton | 89 | Rupprecht Motorsport | Ford AU Falcon | DNQ | DNS |
| (Australia) Grant Elliott | 98 | Sydney Star Racing | Holden VX Commodore | DNQ | DNS |
