= 2003 V8 Supercar season =

44th year of touring car racing in Australia

Seasons
- ← 2002 2004 →

The 2003 V8 Supercar season was the 44th year of touring car racing in Australia since the first runnings of the Australian Touring Car Championship and the fore-runner of the present day Bathurst 1000, the Armstrong 500.

There were 21 touring car race meetings held during 2003; a thirteen-round series for V8 Supercars, the 2003 V8 Supercar Championship Series (VCS), two of them endurance races; a six-round second tier V8 Supercar series 2003 Konica V8 Supercar Series (KVS) along with a non-point scoring race supporting the Bathurst 1000 and V8 Supercar support programme event at the 2003 Australian Grand Prix.

== Season review ==
The 2003 season brought substantial change at the pointy end of the series, with the era of the Holden Racing Teams dominance of V8 Supercar ending and the era of Stone Brothers Racing beginning. Marcos Ambrose form throughout the series was irresistible. From the series third round at Eastern Creek Raceway to the eighth round at Oran Park Raceway SBR Falcons took all six wins, Ambrose five of them with a second place behind Ingall at Queensland Raceway the only aberration. Ingall would win again in the Gold Coast street race with Ambrose confirming his championship at the Eastern Creek championship finale. Holden did not give in willingly, Mark Skaife and Greg Murphy each winning two rounds, with Skaife and Todd Kelly taking the reborn Sandown 500 as one of them, while one of Murphy's wins was Bathurst with his co-driver Rick Kelly becoming the youngest Bathurst winner. The only other round winner was Craig Lowndes had his first win for new team Ford Performance Racing.

Apart from the enduros, Stone Brothers Racing swept all before them with Mark Winterbottom dominating the Konica V8 Supercar Series in SBR's older AU Falcon. Winterbottom won four of the six rounds, the others were won by Andrew Jones and eventual series runner up Matthew White.

== Results and standings ==
=== Race calendar ===
The 2003 Australian touring car season consisted of 20 events.

Date	Series	Circuit	City / state	Winner	Team	Car	Report
23 Feb	KVS Round 1	Wakefield Park	Goulburn, New South Wales	Mark Winterbottom	Stone Brothers Racing	Ford AU Falcon	
7–8 Mar	Netspace V8Supercar Showdown	Albert Park street circuit	Melbourne, Victoria	Russell Ingall	Stone Brothers Racing	Ford BA Falcon	report
18–22 Mar	KVS Round 2	Adelaide Street Circuit	Adelaide, South Australia	Mark Winterbottom	Stone Brothers Racing	Ford AU Falcon	
18–22 Mar	Clipsal 500 VCS Round 1	Adelaide Street Circuit	Adelaide, South Australia	Mark Skaife	Holden Racing Team	Holden VY Commodore	
13 Apr	VCS Round 2	Phillip Island Grand Prix Circuit	Phillip Island, Victoria	Craig Lowndes	Ford Performance Racing	Ford BA Falcon	
3–4 May	KVS Round 3	Eastern Creek Raceway	Sydney, New South Wales	Mark Winterbottom	Stone Brothers Racing	Ford AU Falcon	
3–4 May	VCS Round 3	Eastern Creek Raceway	Sydney, New South Wales	Marcos Ambrose	Stone Brothers Racing	Ford BA Falcon	
25 May	VCS Round 4	Winton Motor Raceway	Benalla, Victoria	Marcos Ambrose	Stone Brothers Racing	Ford BA Falcon	
7–8 Jun	VB 400 VCS Round 5	Barbagallo Raceway	Perth, Western Australia	Marcos Ambrose	Stone Brothers Racing	Ford BA Falcon	
28 Jun	VCS Round 6	Hidden Valley Raceway	Darwin, Northern Territory	Mark Skaife	Holden Racing Team	Holden VY Commodore	
6 Jul	KVS Round 4	Phillip Island Grand Prix Circuit	Phillip Island, Victoria	Matthew White	Matthew White Racing	Holden VT Commodore	
19–20 Jul	VCS Round 7	Queensland Raceway	Ipswich, Queensland	Russell Ingall	Stone Brothers Racing	Ford BA Falcon	
3 Aug	KVS Round 5	Winton Motor Raceway	Benalla, Victoria	Andrew Jones	Brad Jones Racing	Ford AU Falcon	
16–17 Aug	VCS Round 8	Oran Park Raceway	Sydney, New South Wales	Marcos Ambrose	Stone Brothers Racing	Ford BA Falcon	
31 Aug	KVS Round 6	Mallala Motor Sport Park	Adelaide, South Australia	Mark Winterbottom	Stone Brothers Racing	Ford AU Falcon	
12–13 Sep	Betta Electrical 500 VCS Round 9	Sandown Raceway	Melbourne, Victoria	Mark Skaife; Todd Kelly	Holden Racing Team	Holden VY Commodore	report
11–12 Oct	Konica V8 Supercar Challenge	Mount Panorama Circuit	Bathurst, New South Wales	Mark Winterbottom	Stone Brothers Racing	Ford AU Falcon	report
11–12 Oct	Bob Jane T-Marts 1000 VCS Round 10	Mount Panorama Circuit	Bathurst, New South Wales	Greg Murphy; Rick Kelly	K-Mart Racing Team	Holden VY Commodore	report
25–26 Oct	Gillette V8 Supercar Challenge VCS Round 11	Surfers Paradise street circuit	Surfers Paradise, Queensland	Russell Ingall	Stone Brothers Racing	Ford BA Falcon	
8–9 Nov	Placemakers V8 International VCS Round 12	Pukekohe Park Raceway	Pukekohe, New Zealand	Greg Murphy	K-Mart Racing Team	Holden VY Commodore	
29–30 Nov	VIP Pet Foods Main Event VCS Round 13	Eastern Creek Raceway	Sydney, New South Wales	Marcos Ambrose	Stone Brothers Racing	Ford BA Falcon	

=== Netspace V8Supercar Showdown ===
This meeting was a support event of the 2003 Australian Grand Prix.

Driver	No.	Team	Car	Race 1	Race 2
(Australia) Russell Ingall	9	Stone Brothers Racing	Ford AU Falcon	2	1
(New Zealand) Steven Richards	11	Castrol Perkins Racing	Holden VX Commodore	3	2
(Australia) Jason Bright	50	Paul Weel Racing	Holden VX Commodore	1	3
(Australia) Jason Bargwanna	20	Larkham Motor Sport	Ford AU Falcon	5	4
(Australia) John Bowe	88	Brad Jones Racing	Ford BA Falcon	6	5
(Australia) Steven Johnson	17	Dick Johnson Racing	Ford BA Falcon	9	6
(Australia) Craig Lowndes	6	Ford Performance Racing	Ford BA Falcon	7	7
(New Zealand) Greg Murphy	51	K-Mart Racing Team	Holden VX Commodore	4	8
(Australia) Dean Canto	66	Briggs Motor Sport	Ford BA Falcon	11	9
(Australia) David Besnard	19	Ford Performance Racing	Ford AU Falcon	10	10
(Australia) Paul Dumbrell	8	Castrol Perkins Racing	Holden VX Commodore	14	11
(Australia) Rodney Forbes	7	Gibson Motorsport	Ford AU Falcon	15	12
(Brazil) Max Wilson	18	Dick Johnson Racing	Ford BA Falcon	24	13
(Australia) Rick Kelly	15	K-Mart Racing Team	Holden VX Commodore	13	14
(Australia) Paul Morris	29	Paul Morris Motorsport	Holden VY Commodore	16	15
(New Zealand) Paul Radisich	65	Briggs Motor Sport	Ford BA Falcon	DNF	16
(Australia) Glenn Seton	5	Ford Performance Racing	Ford AU Falcon	17	17
(Australia) Mark Skaife	1	Holden Racing Team	Holden VY Commodore	DNF	18
(Australia) Cameron McConville	3	Lansvale Racing Team	Holden VX Commodore	20	19
(Australia) Mark Larkham	10	Larkham Motor Sport	Ford AU Falcon	22	20
(Australia) Greg Ritter	00	Gibson Motorsport	Ford BA Falcon	21	21
(Australia) Brad Jones	21	Brad Jones Racing	Ford BA Falcon	12	22
(New Zealand) Jason Richards	45	Team Dynamik	Holden VY Commodore	23	DNF
(New Zealand) Simon Wills	44	Team Dynamik	Holden VY Commodore	25	DNF
(Australia) Anthony Tratt	75	Paul Little Racing	Ford AU Falcon	27	DNF
(Australia) Jamie Whincup	33	Garry Rogers Motorsport	Holden VX Commodore	19	DNF
(Australia) Marcos Ambrose	4	Stone Brothers Racing	Ford AU Falcon	18	DNF
(New Zealand) Craig Baird	69	Team Kiwi Racing	Holden VX Commodore	26	DNF
(Australia) Steve Ellery	31	Supercheap Auto Racing	Ford BA Falcon	8	DNS
(Australia) Todd Kelly	2	Holden Racing Team	Holden VY Commodore	DNF	DNS
(Australia) Garth Tander	34	Garry Rogers Motorsport	Holden VY Commodore	DNF	DNS
(Australia) Paul Weel	16	Paul Weel Racing	Holden VX Commodore	DNF	DNS

=== Konica V8 Supercar Challenge Race ===
This race was a support event of the 2003 Bob Jane T-Marts 1000.

Driver	No.	Team	Car	Grid	Race
(Australia) Mark Winterbottom	41	Stone Brothers Racing	Ford AU Falcon	Pole	1
(Australia) Warren Luff	71	Dick Johnson Racing	Ford AU Falcon	2	2
(Australia) Matthew White	28	Matthew White Racing	Ford AU Falcon	4	3
(New Zealand) Mark Porter	64	Independent Race Cars Australia	Holden VX Commodore	6	4
(Australia) Adam Wallis	88	Halliday Motor Sport	Ford AU Falcon	7	5
(Australia) Tony D'Alberto	96	Holden Young Lions	Holden VX Commodore	8	6
(Australia) Kevin Mundy	56	Kevin Mundy Racing	Ford AU Falcon	5	7
(Australia) Grant Elliott	98	Sydney Star Racing	Holden VS Commodore	10	8
(Australia) Mark Howard	37	Howard Racing	Ford AU Falcon	9	9
(Australia) Ben Eggleston	38	Eggleston Motorsport	Holden VX Commodore	11	10
(Australia) Derek van Zelm	58	Motorsport Engineering Services	Holden VT Commodore	19	11
(Australia) Steve Voight	100	Thexton Motor Racing	Ford EL Falcon	13	12
(Australia) Tim Gordon	49	Howard Racing	Ford AU Falcon	16	13
(New Zealand) David Thexton	40	Thexton Motor Racing	Ford AU Falcon	17	14
(Australia) Peter Best	90	Allied Chemical Cleaning	Holden VS Commodore	21	15
(Australia) Phill Foster	42	Beikoff Racing	Holden VS Commodore	22	16
(Australia) Ray Ayton	87	Unibrite Property Group	Ford EL Falcon	24	17
(Australia) Tim Rowse	300	ANT Racing	Holden VS Commodore	15	18
(Australia) Clyde Lawrence	35	Clyde Lawrence Racing	Holden VS Commodore	20	DNF
(Australia) John Henderson	666	NMS Racing	Ford EL Falcon	14	DNF
(Australia) Richard Mork	77	V8 Racing	Holden VS Commodore	18	DNF
(Australia) Owen Kelly	22	Paul Cruikshank Racing	Ford AU Falcon	3	DNF
(Australia) Shane Beikoff	68	Beikoff Racing	Ford EL Falcon	12	DNS
(Australia) Milton Seferis	14	Imrie Motor Sport	Holden VX Commodore	23	DNS
(Australia) Garry Willmington	110	Willmington Performance	Ford EL Falcon	25	DNS
