= 2003 Konica V8 Supercar Series =

Motor racing competition

The 2003 Konica V8 Supercar Series was an Australian motor racing competition held for V8 Supercars. It was the fourth V8 Supercar Development Series. The series began on 23 February 2003 at Wakefield Park and finished on 31 August at Mallala Motor Sport Park after sixteen races at six rounds held across three different states.

Series winner Mark Winterbottom won eight of the 16 races and four of the six rounds. The new points system placed an increased emphasis on finishing races and series runner up Matthew White scored just 58 points less than Winterbottom, despite taking only two race wins and six top three race finishes.

== Teams and drivers ==
The following teams and drivers competed in the 2003 Konica V8 Supercar Series. This was the last season that the Holden VS Commodore and Ford EL Falcon was eligible.

Team	Car	No.	Driver	Rounds
Brad Jones Racing	Ford AU Falcon	12	(Australia) Andrew Jones	1–2, 4–6
Imrie Motor Sport	Holden VX Commodore	14	(Australia) Geoff Full	1–2
Imrie Motor Sport	Holden VX Commodore	14	(Australia) Steve Owen	4–6
Paul Cruickshank Racing	Ford AU Falcon	22	(Australia) Todd Wanless	1–3, 5–6
Terry Wyhoon Racing	Ford AU Falcon	25	(Australia) Terry Wyhoon	All
M3 Motorsport	Holden VT Commodore; Holden VX Commodore	26	(Australia) Bob McDonald	1
M3 Motorsport	Holden VT Commodore; Holden VX Commodore	26	(Australia) Peter Doulman	4–5
Howard Racing	Ford AU Falcon	27	(Australia) Marcus Marshall	4–5
Howard Racing	Ford AU Falcon	49	(Australia) Tim Gordon	All
Howard Racing	Ford AU Falcon	94	(Australia) Mark Howard	All
Matthew White Racing	Holden VX Commodore; Ford AU Falcon	28	(Australia) Matthew White	All
Steven Ellery Racing	Ford AU Falcon	30	(Australia) Luke Youlden	All
Clyde Lawrence Racing	Holden VS Commodore; Holden VX Commodore	35	(Australia) Clyde Lawrence	1–3, 5–6
South Pacific Motor Sport	Holden VS Commodore	38	(Australia) Mathew Hunt	3
Peters Motorsport	Ford AU Falcon	40	(Australia) Brett Peters	All
Stone Brothers Racing	Ford AU Falcon	41	(Australia) Mark Winterbottom	All
Holden Young Lions	Holden VX Commodore	46	(Australia) Dale Brede	All
Holden Young Lions	Holden VX Commodore	96	(Australia) Tony D'Alberto	3–6
Craig Bastian	Ford AU Falcon	47	(Australia) Craig Bastian	All
Fernández Racing	Ford AU Falcon	55	(Australia) José Fernández	1–4, 6
Kevin Mundy Racing	Ford AU Falcon	56	(Australia) Kevin Mundy	All
Motorsport Engineering Services	Holden VT Commodore	58	(Australia) Derek van Zelm	4–5
Phoenix Motorsport	Holden VX Commodore	59	(Australia) Jamie Miller	All
Independent Race Cars Australia	Holden VX Commodore	64	(New Zealand) Mark Porter	All
Shane Beikoff Racing	Holden VS Commodore; Ford EL Falcon	68	(Australia) Shane Beikoff	1–3, 5
CarTrek Racing	Holden VX Commodore	69	(Australia) Robert Jones	2–6
Dick Johnson Racing	Ford AU Falcon	71	(Australia) Tony Ricciardello	1–5
Dick Johnson Racing	Ford AU Falcon	71	(Australia) Warren Luff	6
Robert Smith Racing	Holden VX Commodore	72	(Australia) Owen Kelly	All
V8 Racing	Holden VS Commodore	77	(Australia) Richard Mork	1, 3
V8 Racing	Holden VS Commodore	77	(Australia) Michael Simpson	2
V8 Racing	Holden VS Commodore	77	(Australia) Tim Rowse	4–5
Graham Crawford	Ford EL Falcon	87	(Australia) Graham Crawford	1–2, 4
Halliday Motor Sport	Ford AU Falcon	88	(Australia) Peter Gazzard	All
Sydney Star Racing	Ford AU Falcon	89	(Australia) Adam Wallis	4–6
Sydney Star Racing	Holden VS Commodore	98	(Australia) Grant Elliott	All
Peter Best	Holden VS Commodore	90	(Australia) Peter Best	3–4
Phoenix Motorsport	Holden VS Commodore	95	(Australia) Ron Searle	1
Thexton Motor Racing	Ford AU Falcon	100	(Australia) David Thexton	4–6
Chance of a Lifetime	Ford AU Falcon	110	(Australia) David Russell	All
A.N.T. Racing	Holden VS Commodore	300	(Australia) Tony Evangelou	1–2, 4–5
Nichols Motorsport	Ford EL Falcon	666	(Australia) Phillip Nichols	1, 3–4

== Race calendar ==
Round	Date	Circuit	Location	Winning driver
1	22–23 February	(New South Wales) Wakefield Park	Goulburn, New South Wales	(Australia) Mark Winterbottom
2	20–21 March	(South Australia) Adelaide Street Circuit	Adelaide, South Australia	(Australia) Mark Winterbottom
3	3–4 May	(New South Wales) Eastern Creek Raceway	Sydney, New South Wales	(Australia) Mark Winterbottom
4	5–6 July	(Victoria (state)) Phillip Island Grand Prix Circuit	Phillip Island, Victoria	(Australia) Matthew White
5	2–3 August	(Victoria (state)) Winton Motor Raceway	Benalla, Victoria	(Australia) Andrew Jones
6	30–31 August	(South Australia) Mallala Motor Sport Park	Mallala, South Australia	(Australia) Mark Winterbottom

== Points system ==
The series consisted of six rounds across three different states. Rounds 1 and 3–6 consisted of three races. The second race of each weekend saw the finishing order of race 1 reversed to form the grid, a 'reverse grid' race. Round 2 consisted of a single race. Points were awarded for all cars who finished each race in finishing order. Points may have been offered beyond the 29th position but at no point during the series did more than 29 cars finish a race. Round 2's single race carried three times the points of a single race elsewhere in the series. The pointscore also saw the worst round result deducted, although the worst result had to be a round the competitor had entered.

Position	1st	2nd	3rd	4th	5th	6th	7th	8th	9th	10th	11th	12th	13th	14th	15th	16th	17th	18th	19th	20th	21st	22nd	23rd	24th	25th	26th	27th	28th	29th
Rounds 1 & 3–6 Points	64	62	60	58	56	54	52	50	48	46	44	42	40	38	36	34	32	30	28	26	24	22	20	18	16	14	12	10	8
Round 2 Points	192	186	180	174	168	162	156	150	144	138	132	126	120	114	108	102	96	90	84	78	72	66	60	54	48	42	36	30	24

== Series standings ==
Points table referenced, in part, as follows:

Pos.	Driver	No.	WAK (New South Wales)			ADE (South Australia)	EAS (New South Wales)			PHI (Victoria (state))			WIN (Victoria (state))			MAL (South Australia)			Pen.	Points
1	(Australia) Mark Winterbottom	41	1	6	1	1	3	1	2	1	6	7	13	3	2	1	1	1	0	922 (1084)
2	(Australia) Matthew White	28	4	8	6	4	6	7	1	6	3	1	2	9	4	2	8	2	0	864 (1026)
3	(New Zealand) Mark Porter	64	8	12	4	3	13	2	Ret	4	9	9	24	2	Ret	4	7	3	0	780 (876)
4	(Australia) Brett Peters	40	14	1	7	8	8	Ret	11	7	11	3	11	22	8	9	12	7	0	718 (812)
5	(Australia) Luke Youlden	30	7	3	5	20	2	4	7	23	1	2	4	13	6	19	Ret	10	50	688 (766)
6	(Australia) Dale Brede	46	Ret	4	16	2	5	13	4	3	Ret	DNS	3	Ret	7	7	Ret	6	0	680 (740)
7	(Australia) Owen Kelly	72	2	9	2	11	1	15	3	26	2	Ret	25	1	3	Ret	DNS	DNS	0	680 (702)
8	(Australia) Peter Gazzard	88	Ret	13	8	5	7	9	5	21	5	6	6	12	Ret	6	Ret	DNS	0	658 (712)
9	(Australia) Craig Bastian	47	17	7	11	Ret	9	5	10	9	23	10	14	7	10	18	13	19	0	626
10	(Australia) Kevin Mundy	56	9	14	10	7	15	6	6	20	24	14	8	Ret	9	11	Ret	DNS	0	612 (684)
11	(Australia) Andrew Jones	12	6	2	9	24				2	4	Ret	1	5	1	3	Ret	4	0	604 (658)
12	(Australia) David Russell	110	Ret	DNS	DNS	13	12	11	9	13	7	11	10	18	11	Ret	17	Ret	0	542 (560)
13	(Australia) Jamie Miller	59	19	19	17	16	14	12	14	16	18	13	19	15	22	15	11	11	0	536 (622)
14	(Australia) Terry Wyhoon	25	Ret	DNS	DNS	12	17	Ret	12	12	Ret	DNS	12	4	15	12	4	17	0	510
15	(Australia) José Fernández	55	10	10	DNS	9	16	3	8	14	10	17				Ret	DNS	13	0	496 (536)
16	(Australia) Todd Wanless	22	5	15	14	14	10	8	Ret				5	Ret	20	16	3	15	0	470 (552)
17	(Australia) Tony Ricciardello	71	3	5	3	21	4	10	Ret	Ret	17	18	Ret	8	Ret				0	440 (490)
18	(Australia) Robert Jones	69				15	Ret	17	13	8	Ret	DNS	18	11	14	10	9	9	0	434 (484)
19	(Australia) Mark Howard	94	11	17	15	Ret	Ret	16	16	18	19	16	22	14	16	17	Ret	16	0	432
20	(Australia) Grant Elliott	98	16	Ret	DNS	10	11	Ret	DNS	28	Ret	Ret	9	19	Ret	13	Ret	14	0	370 (380)
21	(Australia) Tony D'Alberto	96					Ret	14	15	10	21	8	Ret	DNS	DNS	14	5	8	0	338
22	(Australia) Tim Gordon	49	22	20	Ret	23	22	Ret	17	29	Ret	21	23	20	18	Ret	14	Ret	0	322 (354)
23	(Australia) Clyde Lawrence	35	13	16	19	17	20	Ret	DNS				Ret	DNS	DNS	20	16	20	0	310
24	(Australia) Tony Evangelou	300	21	11	13	18				24	13	Ret	20	16	23				0	278 (336)
25	(Australia) Shane Beikoff	68	18	21	12	19	21	18	18				21	Ret	DNS				0	264 (288)
26	(Australia) Steve Owen	14								27	8	5	Ret	6	5	8	10	Ret	0	238 (348)
27	(Australia) Adam Wallis	89								17	14	22	15	10	21	21	2	12	0	234 (326)
28	(Australia) David Thexton	100								19	16	15	17	23	17	Ret	15	18	0	182 (248)
29	(Australia) Graham Crawford	87	15	Ret	18	22				22	20	20							0	160 (226)
30	(Australia) Marcus Marshall	27								5	25	4	7	17	Ret				0	130 (232)
31	(Australia) Tim Rowse	77								15	15	12	16	Ret	13				0	114 (188)
32	(Australia) Peter Doulman	26								11	12	19	26	Ret	12				0	114 (170)
33	(Australia) Richard Mork	77	20	18	Ret		18	Ret	Ret										0	56 (86)
34	(Australia) Derek van Zelm	58								Ret	Ret	DNS	Ret	21	19				0	52
35	(Australia) Peter Best	90					Ret	Ret	19	25	22	DNS							0	48 (86)
36	(Australia) Geoff Full	14	12	Ret	Ret	Ret													0	42
–	(Australia) Warren Luff	71														5	6	5	0	0 (166)
–	(Australia) Michael Simpson	77				6													0	0 (162)
–	(Australia) Mathew Hunt	38					19	19	Ret										0	0 (78)
–	(Australia) Bob McDonald	26	Ret	22	Ret														0	0 (66)
–	(Australia) Phillip Nichols	666	DNS	DNS	DNS		DNS	DNS	DNS	Ret	DNS	DNS							0	0
–	(Australia) Ron Searle	95	DNS	DNS	DNS														0	0
Pos.	Driver	No.	WAK (New South Wales)			ADE (South Australia)	EAS (New South Wales)			PHI (Victoria (state))			WIN (Victoria (state))			MAL (South Australia)			Pen.	Points

Colour	Result
Gold	Winner
Silver	Second place
Bronze	Third place
Green	Points classification
Blue	Non-points classification
Blue	Non-classified finish (NC)
Purple	Retired, not classified (Ret)
Red	Did not qualify (DNQ)
Red	Did not pre-qualify (DNPQ)
Black	Disqualified (DSQ)
White	Did not start (DNS)
White	Withdrew (WD)
White	Race cancelled (C)
Blank	Did not practice (DNP)
Blank	Did not arrive (DNA)
Blank	Excluded (EX)

== See also ==
- 2003 V8 Supercar season
