= 2004 Betta Electrical Sandown 500 =

2004 Supercar Championship event

(Victoria (state)) 2004 Betta Electrical Sandown 500
Event Information
- Round 9 of 13 in the 2004 V8 Supercar Championship Series
- Date: 10–12 September 2004
- Location: Melbourne, Victoria
- Venue: Sandown International Raceway
- Weather: Fine

Results
Race 1
| Distance | 160 laps | 496 km |
| Pole position | Rick Kelly; Kmart Racing Team | 1:22.1422 |
| Winner | Marcos Ambrose; Greg Ritter; Stone Brothers Racing | 3:41:03.1307 |
Round Results
| First | Marcos Ambrose Greg Ritter; Stone Brothers Racing | 192 pts |
| Second | Russell Ingall Cameron McLean; Stone Brothers Racing | 188 pts |
| Third | Steven Johnson Warren Luff; Dick Johnson Racing | 184 pts |

The 2004 Betta Electrical Sandown 500 was the ninth round of the Australian 2004 V8 Supercar Championship Series. It was held on the weekend of 10–12 September 2004 at Sandown International Raceway in Melbourne, Victoria.

It was the 37th "Sandown 500" endurance race to be held at the Victorian circuit.

== Top 10 Shootout ==
The ten fastest cars from Qualifying contested a Top 10 Shootout on the Saturday to determine the starting positions on the first five rows of the grid.

Sourced from:

| Pos | No | Team | Driver | Car | Time |
|---|---|---|---|---|---|
| Pole | 51 | Kmart Racing | (Australia) Rick Kelly | Holden VY Commodore | 1:22.1422 |
| 2 | 1 | Stone Brothers Racing | (Australia) Marcos Ambrose | Ford BA Falcon | 1:22.7453 |
| 3 | 29 | Team Sirromet Wines | (Australia) Paul Morris | Holden VY Commodore | 1:22.8858 |
| 4 | 2 | Holden Racing Team | (Australia) Mark Skaife | Holden VY Commodore | 1:23.2208 |
| 5 | 6 | Ford Performance Racing | (Australia) Craig Lowndes | Ford BA Falcon | 1:23.3147 |
| 6 | 17 | Dick Johnson Racing | (Australia) Steven Johnson | Ford BA Falcon | 1:23.8786 |
| 7 | 50 | Paul Weel Racing | (Australia) Jason Bright | Holden VY Commodore | 1:24.7091 |
| 8 | 8 | Castrol Perkins Racing | (Australia) Paul Dumbrell | Holden VY Commodore | 1:25.1486 |
| 9 | 10 | Larkham Motor Sport | (Australia) Jason Bargwanna | Ford BA Falcon | 1:25.3394 |
| 10 | 18 | Dick Johnson Racing | (Australia) Owen Kelly | Ford BA Falcon | 1:25.9627 |

== Official results ==
Sourced from:

| Pos | No | Team | Drivers | Car | Laps | Qual Pos | Shootout Pos | Series Points |
|---|---|---|---|---|---|---|---|---|
| 1 | 1 | Stone Brothers Racing | (Australia) Marcos Ambrose (Australia) Greg Ritter | Ford BA Falcon | 160 | 4 | 2 | 192 |
| 2 | 9 | Stone Brothers Racing | (Australia) Russell Ingall (Australia) Cameron McLean | Ford BA Falcon | 160 | 15 | | 188 |
| 3 | 17 | Dick Johnson Racing | (Australia) Steven Johnson (Australia) Warren Luff | Ford BA Falcon | 160 | 6 | 6 | 184 |
| 4 | 34 | Garry Rogers Motorsport | (Australia) Garth Tander (Australia) Cameron McConville | Holden VY Commodore | 160 | 14 | | 180 |
| 5 | 51 | Kmart Racing | (New Zealand) Greg Murphy (Australia) Rick Kelly | Holden VY Commodore | 160 | 3 | 1 | 176 |
| 6 | 10 | Larkham Motor Sport | (Australia) Jason Bargwanna (Australia) Mark Winterbottom | Ford BA Falcon | 160 | 8 | 9 | 172 |
| 7 | 12 | Brad Jones Racing | (Australia) John Bowe (Australia) Brad Jones | Ford BA Falcon | 160 | 21 | | 168 |
| 8 | 8 | Castrol Perkins Racing | (Australia) Paul Dumbrell (Australia) Tony Longhurst | Holden VY Commodore | 159 | 10 | 8 | 164 |
| 9 | 3 | Tasman Motorsport | (New Zealand) Jason Richards (New Zealand) Fabian Coulthard | Holden VY Commodore | 159 | 20 | | 160 |
| 10 | 50 | Paul Weel Racing | (Australia) Jason Bright (Australia) Paul Weel | Holden VY Commodore | 159 | 9 | 7 | 156 |
| 11 | 16 | Paul Weel Racing | (Australia) Matthew White (Australia) Marcus Marshall | Holden VY Commodore | 159 | 23 | | 152 |
| 12 | 75 | Toll Racing | (Australia) Anthony Tratt (Australia) Tomas Mezera | Holden VY Commodore | 158 | 30 | | 148 |
| 13 | 021 | Team Kiwi Racing | (New Zealand) Craig Baird (New Zealand) Mark Porter | Holden VY Commodore | 158 | 17 | | 144 |
| 14 | 05 | Holden Racing Team | (Australia) Peter Brock (United Kingdom) Jason Plato | Holden VY Commodore | 156 | 16 | | 140 |
| 15 | 11 | Castrol Perkins Racing | (New Zealand) Steven Richards (New Zealand) Jim Richards | Holden VY Commodore | 155 | 12 | | 136 |
| 16 | 23 | WPS Racing | (Australia) David Besnard (Australia) Charlie O'Brien (Australia) Neil McFadyen^{1} | Ford BA Falcon | 154 | 18 | | 132 |
| 17 | 29 | Team Sirromet Wines | (Australia) Paul Morris (Australia) Alan Gurr | Holden VY Commodore | 153 | 1 | 3 | 128 |
| 18 | 6 | Ford Performance Racing | (Australia) Craig Lowndes (Australia) Glenn Seton | Ford BA Falcon | 152 | 5 | 5 | 124 |
| 19 | 5 | Ford Performance Racing | (Switzerland) Alain Menu (Australia) Adam Macrow | Ford BA Falcon | 152 | 34 | | 120 |
| 20 | 43 | John Faulkner Racing | (Australia) Christian D'Agostin (Australia) Kurt Wimmer | Holden VX Commodore | 152 | 35 | | 116 |
| 21 | 48 | WPS Racing | (New Zealand) John McIntyre (Malaysia) Alex Yoong | Ford BA Falcon | 148 | 22 | | 112 |
| 22 | 31 | Supercheap Auto Racing | (Australia) Steven Ellery (Australia) Luke Youlden | Ford BA Falcon | 142 | 11 | | 108 |
| 23 | 2 | Holden Racing Team | (Australia) Mark Skaife (Australia) Todd Kelly | Holden VY Commodore | 133 | 2 | 4 | 104 |
| 24 | 24 | Walden Motorsport | (Australia) Garth Walden (Australia) Grant Elliott | Ford AU Falcon | 123 | 33 | | 100 |
| DNF | 33 | Garry Rogers Motorsport | (Australia) Nathan Pretty (Denmark) Allan Simonsen | Holden VY Commodore | 122 | 25 | | |
| DNF | 45 | Team Dynamik | (Australia) Dale Brede (Australia) Will Davison | Holden VY Commodore | 122 | 24 | | |
| DNF | 20 | Larkham Motor Sport | (Australia) Mark Larkham (New Zealand) Matt Halliday | Ford BA Falcon | 121 | 29 | | |
| DNF | 18 | Dick Johnson Racing | (Australia) Owen Kelly (Australia) David Brabham | Ford BA Falcon | 111 | 7 | 10 | |
| DNF | 44 | Team Dynamik | (New Zealand) Simon Wills (Australia) Paul Stokell | Holden VY Commodore | 108 | 27 | | |
| DNF | 7 | Castrol Perkins Racing | (Australia) Alex Davison (Australia) Jamie Whincup | Holden VX Commodore | 83 | 32 | | |
| DNF | 888 | Team Betta Electrical | (Australia) Dean Canto (France) Yvan Muller | Ford BA Falcon | 39 | 26 | | |
| DNF | 88 | Team Betta Electrical | (New Zealand) Paul Radisich (Brazil) Max Wilson | Ford BA Falcon | 37 | 19 | | |
| DNF | 15 | Kmart Racing | (Australia) Steve Owen (Australia) Tim Leahey | Holden VY Commodore | 28 | 13 | | |
| DNF | 14 | Robert Smith Racing | (Australia) Phillip Scifleet (Australia) Lee Holdsworth | Holden VY Commodore | 16 | 31 | | |
| DNF | 21 | Brad Jones Racing | (Australia) Andrew Jones (United Kingdom) John Cleland | Ford BA Falcon | 10 | 28 | | |

^1 - Neil McFadyen practiced the #23 WPS Falcon, but was withdrawn due to a stomach virus, he was replaced by Charlie O'Brien.

== Statistics ==
- Provisional Pole Position - #29 Paul Morris - 1:22.8431
- Pole Position - #51 Rick Kelly - 1:22.1422
- Fastest Lap - #1 Marcos Ambrose - 1:10.8251 (new lap record)
- Race Average Speed - 135km/h
