= 2007 PlaceMakers V8 Supercars =

2007 Supercar Championship event

(New Zealand) 2007 PlaceMakers V8 Supercars
Event Information
- Round 3 of 14 in the 2007 V8 Supercar Championship Series
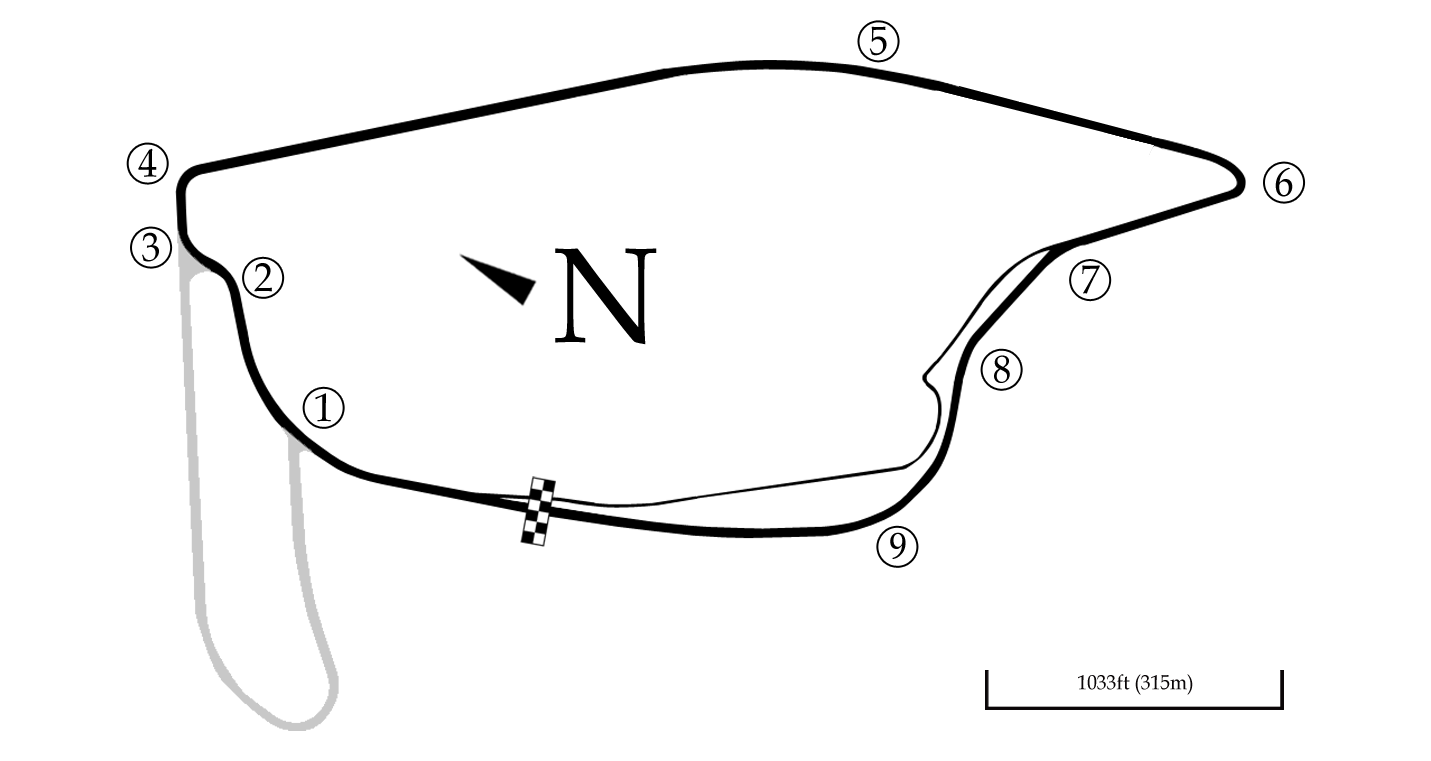
- Date: 20–22 April 2007
- Location: Pukekohe, New Zealand
- Venue: Pukekohe Park Raceway
- Weather: Friday: Sunny; Saturday: Sunny; Sunday: Sunny, partly cloudy

Results
Race 1
Distance	43 laps	120 km
Pole position	Mark Winterbottom; Ford Performance Racing	55.6704
Winner	Garth Tander; HSV Dealer Team	43:46.0087
Race 2
Distance	43 laps	120 km
Winner	Garth Tander; HSV Dealer Team	47:28.1385
Race 3
Distance	36 laps	100 km
Winner	Rick Kelly; HSV Dealer Team	47:13.1552
Round Results
First	Rick Kelly; HSV Dealer Team	58 pts
Second	Garth Tander; HSV Dealer Team	58 pts
Third	Jamie Whincup; Triple Eight Race Engineering	48 pts

The 2007 PlaceMakers V8 Supercars was the third round of the 2007 V8 Supercar Championship Series. It was held on the weekend of 20 to 22 April at Pukekohe Park Raceway in New Zealand and consisted of three races held over 400 kilometers. It also served as the first of two international events on the 2007 schedule, the other being the Desert 400 in Bahrain.

The HSV Dealer Team took a 1-2 victory with Rick Kelly winning on overall points ahead of Garth Tander, who had set the pace throughout the weekend. Conditions throughout the weekend were uncharacteristically consistent with no rain and little cloud cover.

This round was the last V8 Supercar event to be held at Pukekohe until 2013. From 2008 to 2012, the event was moved to a street race in Hamilton.

== Background ==
After years of dissatisfaction with the track facilities, and several attempts at finding alternative venues, it was confirmed that 2007 would be the last V8 Supercar event to be held at Pukekohe Park Raceway. Originally, 2005 was mooted to be the final round, with the city of Auckland initially confirmed to host a street race in and around Victoria Park. However, the project fell through, and focus shifted toward a rejuvenated Wellington street race. But, like the Auckland project, the proposed street track in the nations capital was found to be untenable. It was subsequently confirmed that the championship would return to Pukekohe for a further two years before eventually moving to Hamilton for 2008.

The round served as Cameron McConville's 100th start in the V8 Supercar Championship, and ran the number 100 on his car to mark this achievement.

The six in-car cameras in this round were Greg Murphy, Jason Bright, Rick Kelly, Craig Lowndes, Max Wilson and Paul Dumbrell.

== Race Report ==
=== Qualifying ===
==== Part 1 ====
For the second round in a row, only 30 cars made the grid for qualifying after Jack Perkins from Jack Daniels Racing crashed at approximately 160 km/h into the barrier, on the main straight. The first part of qualifying began with Rick Kelly quickest, however a number of cars including Shane Price, Jason Richards and Steven Richards all ran wide at the hairpin at turn 5. Brad Jones also crashed into the tyre barriers at the hairpin after brake failure, which caused the session to be red flagged. The session was restarted with Garth Tander taking provisional pole from his teammate Rick Kelly and Todd Kelly.

==== Part 2 ====
Once again, a number of drivers including Jamie Whincup, James Courtney and both Jim Beam Racing cars, ran wide at the hairpin, whilst trying to set quick laps which Craig Lowndes was quickest early on. Paul Dumbrell also crashed at turn 4, which caused the second red flag of qualifying. At the end of part 2, James Courtney lead, from Lowndes and Skaife.

==== Part 3 ====
The third part of qualifying began with Whincup running wide at turn 4, and touched the tyre barriers. However he did not suffer any major damage and was able to continue. The pole position holder changed a number of times with Skaife, Whincup and Steven Richards among the drivers who temporarily held pole. Once qualifying finished, Mark Winterbottom had the quickest lap and took pole, from Garth Tander and team-mate Steven Richards in third.

Pos	No	Name	Team	Vehicle	Time
1	5	(Australia) Mark Winterbottom	Ford Performance Racing	Ford Falcon (BF)	0:55.6704
2	16	(Australia) Garth Tander	HSV Dealer Team	Holden Commodore (VE)	0:55.7472
3	6	(New Zealand) Steven Richards	Ford Performance Racing	Ford Falcon (BF)	0:55.7829
4	1	(Australia) Rick Kelly	HSV Dealer Team	Holden Commodore (VE)	0:55.8038
5	88	(Australia) Jamie Whincup	Triple Eight Race Engineering	Ford Falcon (BF)	0:55.8338
6	2	(Australia) Mark Skaife	Holden Racing Team	Holden Commodore (VE)	0:55.8914
7	4	(Australia) James Courtney	Stone Brothers Racing	Ford Falcon (BF)	0:55.9017
8	888	(Australia) Craig Lowndes	Triple Eight Race Engineering	Ford Falcon (BF)	0:55.9271
9	9	(Australia) Russell Ingall	Stone Brothers Racing	Ford Falcon (BF)	0:56.0126
10	22	(Australia) Todd Kelly	Holden Racing Team	Holden Commodore (VE)	0:56.0329
11	3	(New Zealand) Jason Richards	Tasman Motorsport	Holden Commodore (VE)	0:56.1935
12	51	(New Zealand) Greg Murphy	Tasman Motorsport	Holden Commodore (VE)	0:56.2010
13	18	(Australia) Will Davison	Dick Johnson Racing	Ford Falcon (BF)	0:56.2116
14	17	(Australia) Steven Johnson	Dick Johnson Racing	Ford Falcon (BF)	0:56.2429
15	021	(New Zealand) Paul Radisich	Team Kiwi Racing	Ford Falcon (BF)	0:56.2550
16	55	(Australia) Steve Owen	Rod Nash Racing	Holden Commodore (VZ)	0:56.4472
17	111	(Australia) John Bowe	Paul Cruickshank Racing	Ford Falcon (BF)	0:56.4827
18	25	(Australia) Jason Bright	Britek Motorsport	Ford Falcon (BF)	0:56.4952
19	33	(Australia) Lee Holdsworth	Garry Rogers Motorsport	Holden Commodore (VE)	0:56.5121
20	20	(Australia) Paul Dumbrell	Paul Weel Racing	Holden Commodore (VE)	0:56.5823
21	100	(Australia) Cameron McConville	Paul Weel Racing	Holden Commodore (VE)	0:56.7534
22	34	(Australia) Dean Canto	Garry Rogers Motorsport	Holden Commodore (VE)	0:56.7572
23	8	(Brazil) Max Wilson	WPS Racing	Ford Falcon (BF)	0:56.8609
24	39	(New Zealand) Fabian Coulthard	Paul Morris Motorsport	Holden Commodore (VZ)	0:56.8658
25	12	(Australia) Andrew Jones	Brad Jones Racing	Ford Falcon (BF)	0:56.9623
26	10	(Australia) Jason Bargwanna	WPS Racing	Ford Falcon (BF)	0:57.0628
27	7	(Australia) Shane Price	Perkins Engineering	Holden Commodore (VE)	0:57.1221
28	14	(Australia) Brad Jones	Brad Jones Racing	Ford Falcon (BF)	0:57.5039
29	26	(Australia) Alan Gurr	Britek Motorsport	Ford Falcon (BF)	0:57.6683
30	67	(Australia) Paul Morris	Paul Morris Motorsport	Holden Commodore (VE)	0:57.8552
-	11	(Australia) Jack Perkins	Perkins Engineering	Holden Commodore (VE)	no time

=== Race 1 ===
Tander got off the line and beat Mark Winterbottom into the first corner. Meanwhile, Dean Canto ran wide at the first corner and into the gravel trap, causing the safety car to come out at the end of the first lap. Brad Jones' car began heaving smoke barely two laps into the race. He would eventually retire from the race due to a hydraulic problem. The race proved tricky for Britek Motorsport, with both cars in the pits on lap 11 with Jason Bright's car cutting out, which was the same problem that caused the accident in Perth and Alan Gurr's car suffering from a sticky throttle.

Tander lost the lead to Winterbottom after both had completed their compulsory pitstops, and barely withheld a challenge from Steven Richards after exiting the pits. Both cars almost speared off the circuit on lap 20; locking tyres as the battled raged. Once the tyres came up to temperature, Tander pulled away from Richards and set off after Winterbottom. A slow pitstop from Mark Skaife proved costly and dropped last years round winner tumbling down the order. Andrew Jones completed a dicey move on Jason Bargwanna at the hairpin which, remarkably, resulted in no damage for either car. Craig Lowndes' day was less than optimal; outbraking himself at the hairpin and dropping himself out of the top ten. Steven Richards struggled to arrest his career in the braking areas and eventually found himself losing positions to Rick Kelly and Jamie Whincup. Paul Morris meanwhile would retire from the race with engine issues.

With a handful of laps to go, Tander began to apply pressure to Winterbottom. On lap 38, Tander finally scythed through at the hairpin to take the lead, much to the approval of the large Holden fan contingent in the crowd. The top five would remain unchanged on the run to the flag, with Tander taking his second win at Pukekohe in two years.

Pos	No	Name	Team	Laps	Time/Retired	Grid	Points
1	16	(Australia) Garth Tander	HSV Dealer Team	43	43min 46.0087sec	2	24
2	5	(Australia) Mark Winterbottom	Ford Performance Racing	43	+ 1.233	1	20
3	1	(Australia) Rick Kelly	HSV Dealer Team	43	+ 2.614	4	17
4	88	(Australia) Jamie Whincup	Triple Eight Race Engineering	43	+ 5.245	5	15
5	6	(New Zealand) Steven Richards	Ford Performance Racing	43	+ 6.807	3	13
6	22	(Australia) Todd Kelly	Holden Racing Team	43	+ 10.534	10	12
7	3	(New Zealand) Jason Richards	Tasman Motorsport	43	+ 16.298	11	11
8	9	(Australia) Russell Ingall	Stone Brothers Racing	43	+ 17.671	9	10
9	4	(Australia) James Courtney	Stone Brothers Racing	43	+ 18.053	7	9
10	2	(Australia) Mark Skaife	Holden Racing Team	43	+ 25.271	6	8
11	18	(Australia) Will Davison	Dick Johnson Racing	43	+ 26.005	13	6
12	51	(New Zealand) Greg Murphy	Tasman Motorsport	43	+ 26.328	12	5
13	17	(Australia) Steven Johnson	Dick Johnson Racing	43	+ 27.219	14	4
14	888	(Australia) Craig Lowndes	Triple Eight Race Engineering	43	+ 28.342	8	3
15	021	(New Zealand) Paul Radisich	Team Kiwi Racing	43	+ 28.342	15	2
16	8	(Brazil) Max Wilson	WPS Racing	43	+ 35.765	23	
17	33	(Australia) Lee Holdsworth	Garry Rogers Motorsport	43	+ 37.978	19	
18	100	(Australia) Cameron McConville	Paul Weel Racing	43	+ 43.720	21	
19	55	(Australia) Steve Owen	Rod Nash Racing	43	+ 51.060	16	
20	10	(Australia) Jason Bargwanna	WPS Racing	43	+ 51.179	26	
21	111	(Australia) John Bowe	Paul Cruickshank Racing	43	+ 55.733	17	
22	39	(New Zealand) Fabian Coulthard	Paul Morris Motorsport	43	+ 55.873	24	
23	20	(Australia) Paul Dumbrell	Paul Weel Racing	43	+ 56.946	20	
24	7	(Australia) Shane Price	Perkins Engineering	42	+ 1 lap	27	
25	34	(Australia) Dean Canto	Garry Rogers Motorsport	40	+ 3 laps	22	
26	12	(Australia) Andrew Jones	Brad Jones Racing	37	+ 6 laps	28	
Ret	67	(Australia) Paul Morris	Paul Morris Motorsport	31	Engine	25	
Ret	26	(Australia) Alan Gurr	Britek Motorsport	21	Throttle	29	
Ret	14	(Australia) Brad Jones	Brad Jones Racing	20	Hydraulics	28	
Ret	25	(Australia) Jason Bright	Britek Motorsport	11	Electrical	18	
DNS	11	(Australia) Jack Perkins	Perkins Engineering		Did Not Start		
Fastest lap: Rick Kelly (HSV Dealer Team), 0:56.4068

=== Race 2 ===
Even before the race had begun, there were problems for Greg Murphy, who had a stuck throttle in the installation laps pre-race. Andrew Jones would start from the pit lane and would be forced to contest the race without power steering.

When the race started, Steven Richards made contact with Todd Kelly and spun off into the wall at turn three. However, he was able to continue, though would suffer another excursion at the hairpin just laps later. Still on the opening lap, Whincup overtook Tander for the race lead, although Tander retook said position on the next lap. Winterbottom followed suit just a couple laps later. Steven Richards' day went from bad to worse after being spun by Morris at the hairpin. Murphy ran wide at the same point of the track and lost five positions. Much like the first race, Winterbottom was able to overtake Tander in the compulsory pitstop cycle. However, he had a major brake lock-up into the hairpin, destroying his front-left tyre and requiring a second pitstop. On lap 28, Jason Richards crashed at the hairpin owing to front-left suspension failure, which led to the first safety car period. Skaife was issued a bad sportsmanship flag for blocking. The second safety car was deployed on lap 37, when Bargwanna ran wide coming onto the front straight and crashed into the safety fence.

When the safety car came back in, it became a sprint to the finish. Tander was never under much pressure and took the win from Whincup. The Kelly brothers squabbled over third, with Rick emerging victorious in that battle.

Pos	No	Name	Team	Laps	Time/Retired	Grid	Points
1	16	(Australia) Garth Tander	HSV Dealer Team	43	47min 28.1385sec	1	24
2	88	(Australia) Jamie Whincup	Triple Eight Race Engineering	43	+ 0.860	4	20
3	1	(Australia) Rick Kelly	HSV Dealer Team	43	+ 1.529	3	17
4	22	(Australia) Todd Kelly	Holden Racing Team	43	+ 1.915	6	15
5	4	(Australia) James Courtney	Stone Brothers Racing	43	+ 2.499	9	13
6	2	(Australia) Mark Skaife	Holden Racing Team	43	+ 3.520	10	12
7	888	(Australia) Craig Lowndes	Triple Eight Race Engineering	43	+ 3.765	14	11
8	18	(Australia) Will Davison	Dick Johnson Racing	43	+ 4.070	11	10
9	9	(Australia) Russell Ingall	Stone Brothers Racing	43	+ 5.255	8	9
10	021	(New Zealand) Paul Radisich	Team Kiwi Racing	43	+ 5.689	10	8
11	51	(New Zealand) Greg Murphy	Tasman Motorsport	43	+ 6.066	12	6
12	8	(Brazil) Max Wilson	WPS Racing	43	+ 7.640	16	5
13	33	(Australia) Lee Holdsworth	Garry Rogers Motorsport	43	+ 8.106	17	4
14	100	(Australia) Cameron McConville	Paul Weel Racing	43	+ 8.471	18	3
15	111	(Australia) John Bowe	Paul Cruickshank Racing	43	+ 8.788	21	2
16	25	(Australia) Jason Bright	Britek Motorsport	43	+ 9.105	30	
17	34	(Australia) Dean Canto	Garry Rogers Motorsport	43	+ 9.408	25	
18	6	(New Zealand) Steven Richards	Ford Performance Racing	43	+ 10.261	5	
19	55	(Australia) Steve Owen	Rod Nash Racing	43	+ 10.607	19	
20	39	(New Zealand) Fabian Coulthard	Paul Morris Motorsport	43	+ 10.831	22	
21	17	(Australia) Steven Johnson	Dick Johnson Racing	43	+ 11.491	13	
22	14	(Australia) Brad Jones	Brad Jones Racing	43	+ 11.867	26	
23	5	(Australia) Mark Winterbottom	Ford Performance Racing	42	+ 1 lap	2	
24	26	(Australia) Alan Gurr	Britek Motorsport	42	+ 1 lap	28	
25	7	(Australia) Shane Price	Perkins Engineering	41	+ 2 laps	24	
Ret	10	(Australia) Jason Bargwanna	WPS Racing	35	Accident	20	
Ret	3	(New Zealand) Jason Richards	Tasman Motorsport	27	Accident	7	
Ret	12	(Australia) Andrew Jones	Brad Jones Racing	15	Steering	26	
Ret	20	(Australia) Paul Dumbrell	Paul Weel Racing	10	Retired	23	
Ret	67	(Australia) Paul Morris	Paul Morris Motorsport	8	Engine	27	
DNS	11	(Australia) Jack Perkins	Perkins Engineering		Did Not Start		
Fastest lap: Mark Winterbottom (Ford Performance Racing), 0:56.5605

=== Race 3 ===
Whincup struggled off the line and lost positions to the Kelly brothers. Davison incurred damage to the front spoiler, causing it to drag on the front-left tyre. Tander set the pace as the leader early on as the race began to settle down. The calm wouldn't last long however as, on lap six, Morris and Brad Jones collided on the approach to Ford Mountain, throwing Morris sideways into the barrier. The impact lifted Morris' car up and sent it into a number of rolls; eventually ending with the car resting on its roof. Morris emerged from the car unscathed as the safety car was dispatched.

Tander continued to control the pace right up until the compulsory pitstop window. When he came in, a slow stop (owing to a cross-threaded wheel nut) lost him an array of positions. Teammate Rick Kelly assumed the lead from brother Todd. Tander began scything through the field with the possibility of a round win still in the play. The pack began to jostle around as several key runners began to move forward. On lap 31, Dean Canto strayed wide at Ford Mountain, slammed the wall and was out of the race. Canto, whilst audibly winded from the accident, emerged unharmed. However, the safety car was deployed once again.

Owing to the late time in the day, as well as AFL commitments for the broadcaster, it soon became evident that the race would finish under time-certain rulings. The slow nature of the recovery of Canto's car, which drew harsh criticism from fans and media, exacerbated the issues. When the race got back underway on lap 36, it would become a one-lap sprint to the finish. Rick Kelly maintained his lead until the end while Tander failed to pass Radisich that would've been required to take the round win. The nature of the finish drew the ire of some drivers, including Tander who claimed they did not know the race would be finished early.

In terms of the overall round, Tander and Rick Kelly were equal on points. However, Kelly won the round after finishing higher in the final race. Kelly would be the last Pukekohe V8 Supercar round winner until the events return in 2013.

Pos	No	Name	Team	Laps	Time/Retired	Grid	Points
1	1	(Australia) Rick Kelly	HSV Dealer Team	36	47min 13.1552sec	3	24
2	22	(Australia) Todd Kelly	Holden Racing Team	36	+ 0.300	4	20
3	4	(Australia) James Courtney	Stone Brothers Racing	36	+ 0.758	5	17
4	888	(Australia) Craig Lowndes	Triple Eight Race Engineering	36	+ 1.189	7	15
5	88	(Australia) Jamie Whincup	Triple Eight Race Engineering	36	+ 1.780	2	13
6	18	(Australia) Will Davison	Dick Johnson Racing	36	+ 2.111	8	12
7	021	(New Zealand) Paul Radisich	Team Kiwi Racing	36	+ 3.055	10	11
8	16	(Australia) Garth Tander	HSV Dealer Team	36	+ 3.214	1	10
9	2	(Australia) Mark Skaife	Holden Racing Team	36	+ 3.610	6	9
10	9	(Australia) Russell Ingall	Stone Brothers Racing	36	+ 3.881	9	8
11	5	(Australia) Mark Winterbottom	Ford Performance Racing	36	+ 4.724	23	6
12	6	(New Zealand) Steven Richards	Ford Performance Racing	36	+ 5.175	18	5
13	51	(New Zealand) Greg Murphy	Tasman Motorsport	36	+ 5.905	11	4
14	8	(Brazil) Max Wilson	WPS Racing	36	+ 6.153	12	3
15	100	(Australia) Cameron McConville	Paul Weel Racing	36	+ 6.942	14	2
16	17	(Australia) Steven Johnson	Dick Johnson Racing	36	+ 7.046	21	
17	33	(Australia) Lee Holdsworth	Garry Rogers Motorsport	36	+ 7.211	13	
18	3	(New Zealand) Jason Richards	Tasman Motorsport	36	+ 8.048	27	
19	39	(New Zealand) Fabian Coulthard	Paul Morris Motorsport	36	+ 8.569	20	
20	7	(Australia) Shane Price	Perkins Engineering	36	+ 8.737	25	
21	55	(Australia) Steve Owen	Rod Nash Racing	36	+ 8.948	19	
22	12	(Australia) Andrew Jones	Brad Jones Racing	36	+ 9.360	28	
23	111	(Australia) John Bowe	Paul Cruickshank Racing	36	+ 9.811	15	
24	26	(Australia) Alan Gurr	Britek Motorsport	36	+ 10.162	24	
25	25	(Australia) Jason Bright	Britek Motorsport	35	+ 1 lap	16	
Ret	34	(Australia) Dean Canto	Garry Rogers Motorsport	27	Accident	17	
Ret	20	(Australia) Paul Dumbrell	Paul Weel Racing	15	Engine	29	
Ret	14	(Australia) Brad Jones	Brad Jones Racing	6	Accident	22	
Ret	67	(Australia) Paul Morris	Paul Morris Motorsport	5	Accident	30	
DNS	10	(Australia) Jason Bargwanna	WPS Racing		Did Not Start		
DNS	11	(Australia) Jack Perkins	Perkins Engineering		Did Not Start		
Fastest lap: Rick Kelly (HSV Dealer Team), 0:56.4550

== Aftermath ==
=== Championship standings ===
Pos.	No	Driver	Team	Pts
1	1	(Australia) Rick Kelly	HSV Dealer Team	173
2	16	(Australia) Garth Tander	HSV Dealer Team	160
3	22	(Australia) Todd Kelly	Holden Racing Team	132
4	88	(Australia) Jamie Whincup	Triple Eight Race Engineering	104
5	2	(Australia) Mark Skaife	Holden Racing Team	104
