= Mark Winterbottom =

Australian racing driver

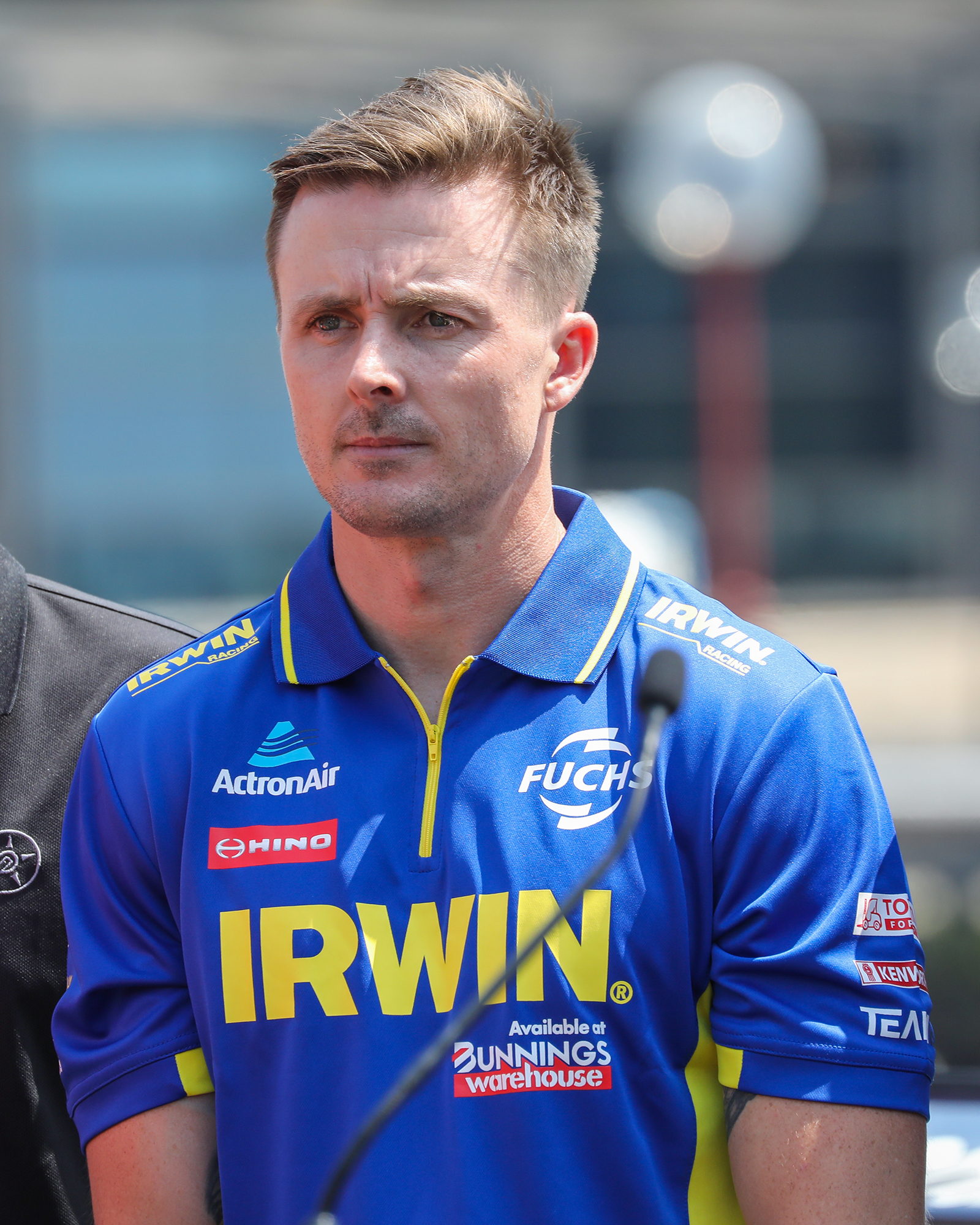
- Winterbottom in 2020
- Nationality: Australian
- Born: Mark James Winterbottom; 20 May 1981 (age 45) Sydney, New South Wales, Australia

Supercars Championship career
- Current team: Tickford Racing (Endurance race co-driver)
- Championships: 1 (2015)
- Races: 615
- Wins: 40
- Podiums: 151
- Pole positions: 43
- 2024 position: 15th (1557 pts)

Mark James "Frosty" Winterbottom (born 20 May 1981) is an Australian semi-retired professional racing driver. He currently drives the No. 6 Ford Mustang S650 with Cameron Waters as an endurance co-driver in the Repco Supercars Championship. His career highlights included winning the 2013 Supercheap Auto Bathurst 1000 (with Steven Richards), twice winning the Sandown 500 (2006 and 2015) and receiving the Mike Kable Young Gun Award in 2003. Winterbottom has also won his maiden championship title in the 2015 International V8 Supercars Championship, making it the first title for Ford in five years.

Winterbottom retired from full-season driving at the end of the 2024 Supercars Championship, but continued as a co-driver in the endurance races for Tickford Racing, driving alongside Cameron Waters.

== Early career ==
=== Beginnings ===
Winterbottom made his motorsport debut racing motorbikes, racing in club level 50 cc events, progressing to the 80 cc class and competing in fields that included riders Anthony Gobert and Chad Reed. Winterbottom raced whenever he could between his soccer commitments. Raced a dirt Mini-Speedcar and won the NSW and ACT State Championships.

=== Karting ===
Winterbottom competed in his first kart race in the Cadet class at Wollongong (NSW) and would continue racing karts successfully to the age of 21. Winterbottom won ten Australian Kart Championships and 25 state Kart Championships during his rise through Australia's karting ranks. Winterbottom's national titles were six Clubman Light titles, three Junior National Lights titles and one Junior Clubman title.

In 1998, Winterbottom visited America on a family holiday and heard about a major karting event taking place close by – so a last-minute decision was made to rent a kart locally and compete. Winterbottom then won the Knoxville State Championship title race. In 1999 he competed in Japan at the Suzuka Champions Kart race on invitation.

In 2001, Winterbottom was crowned as Australian Formula A Kart Champion.

=== Formula Ford ===
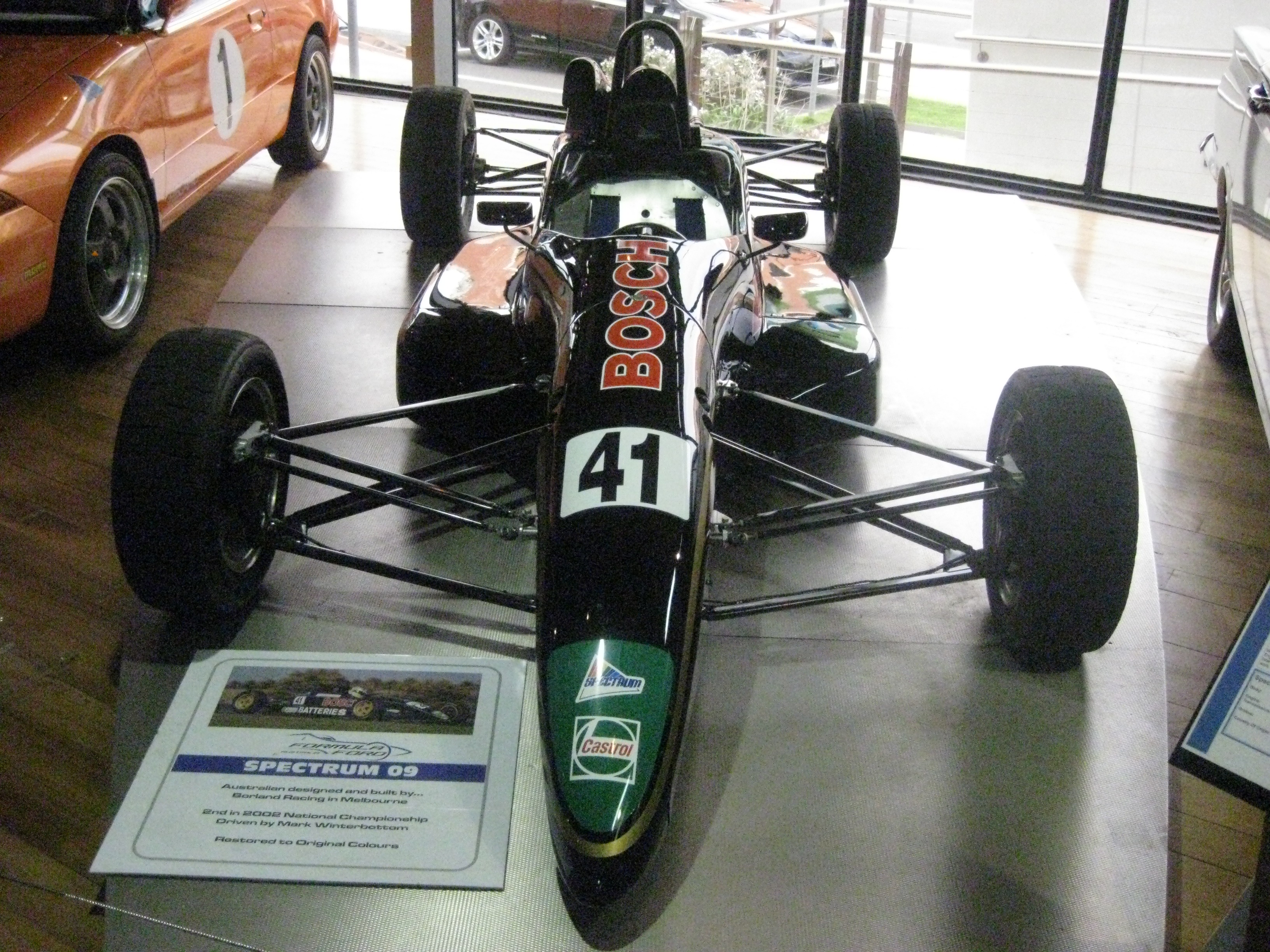
The Spectrum 09 in which Winterbottom placed 2nd in the 2002 Australian Formula Ford Championship.

In 2001, Winterbottom made his Formula Ford debut in the Victorian Formula Ford Championship. Winterbottom raced to runner-up honours after winning four races out of six rounds, missing one round due to karting commitments. He won the Ford Kart Stars Scholarship Championship, gaining a Ford-supported drive in the 2002 Australian Formula Ford Championship.

Winterbottom finished second in the 2002 Australian Formula Ford Championship with two round victories, five race wins and two pole positions. The championship was won by Winterbottom's future V8 Supercars rival Jamie Whincup. He was presented with 2002 Avon Formula Ford Rookie of the Year Award.

== Touring car career ==
=== Development Series ===
In 2003, Winterbottom became the Konica V8 Supercar Series champion in his debut season. Winterbottom raced with Ford team Stone Brothers Racing (SBR) to five round victories and six pole positions in an almost perfect season. Two of Winterbottom's race victories were gained from rear-of-field reverse grid starts. He missed out on making a clean sweep of the series due to an engine failure in the fifth round at Phillip Island.

Winterbottom also debuted in the V8 Supercars Championship at the Sandown 500 and Bathurst 1000 with SBR, sharing a BA Falcon with Mark Noske. Winterbottom and Noske finished 11th at Sandown, before qualifying 16th at the 2003 Bathurst 1000 and then retiring at three-quarter distance whilst running in third with engine problems.

Winterbottom was the recipient of the Mike Kable Young Gun Award.

=== Larkham Motor Sport ===
Winterbottom joined Ford V8 Supercar team Larkham Motor Sport (LMS) and competed in the 2004 and 2005 V8 Supercar championships. Highlights of his debut season included a fifth-place finish at Bathurst and sixth-place result at Sandown in 2004. Winterbottom's best qualifying result was fifth at the Darwin round in 2005. The lowlight was at the V8 Supercars China Round in which Winterbottom avoided injury after a loose drain cover penetrated the chassis floor and damaged the driver's seat.

=== Ford Performance Racing ===
==== 2006 ====
Mark Winterbottom at the 2007 Desert 400 in Bahrain.

Winterbottom joined Ford Performance Racing (FPR) as driver of the number 5 Ford Credit Falcon for the 2006 and 2007 V8 Supercar championship seasons. This appointment continued Winterbottom's career-long involvement with Ford Australia from the karting ranks all the way to a lead role with Ford's major V8 Supercars team.

Winterbottom claimed his first V8 Supercars round victory co-driving with Jason Bright at the 2006 Betta Electrical 500 and gained second place overall round finishes at Pukekohe and Surfers Paradise. By the midpoint of the season, Winterbottom had climbed from 22nd to third in the championship standings and added two further podium finishes with a third at Symmons Plains Raceway and second at Phillip Island. Phillip Island also saw Winterbottom achieve his first V8 Supercars sprint race victory. With nine top ten finishes for the season, Winterbottom had secured third place in the Drivers' Championship in just his third season of main V8 Supercar Series competition.

==== 2007 ====
Winterbottom achieved fifth in the championship, with the highlight being winning his first solo V8 Supercars round at the Desert 400 in Bahrain, preserving FPR's undefeated record at the international round. Winterbottom also gained four pole positions, including his first at Pukekohe Park, which was followed by poles at the Sandown 500, Bathurst 1000 and at the Desert 400. These four poles allowed him to claim the 2007 V8 Supercars Pole Award. Winterbottom went off late in the race whilst leading the 2007 Bathurst 1000. FPR secured Winterbottom as the driver of the number 5 FPR Falcon for a further three years.

==== 2008 ====
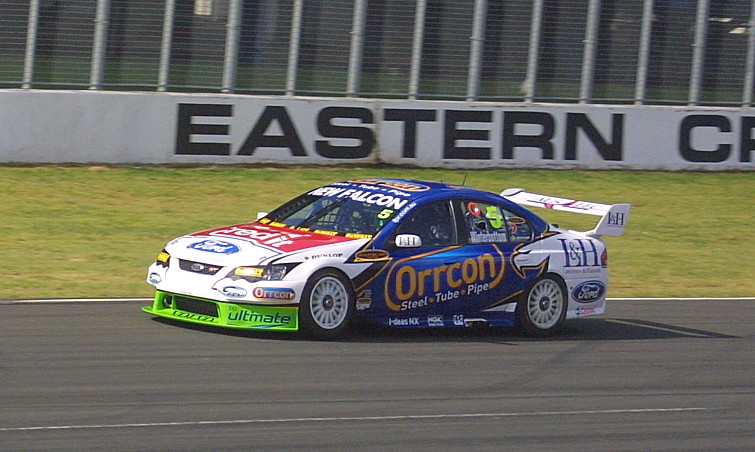
Winterbottom at Eastern Creek Raceway in 2008

Winterbottom's highlight of 2008 was a dominant round victory at the BigPond 400 at Wanneroo's Barbagallo Raceway in Perth, Western Australia. Winterbottom achieved pole position and wins in all three races. Winterbottom also won the 2008 City of Ipswich 400 at Queensland Raceway. With further good results at Adelaide, Eastern Creek, Surfers Paradise and Symmons Plains, he placed second in the championship, just behind his former Formula Ford rival Whincup.

==== 2009 ====
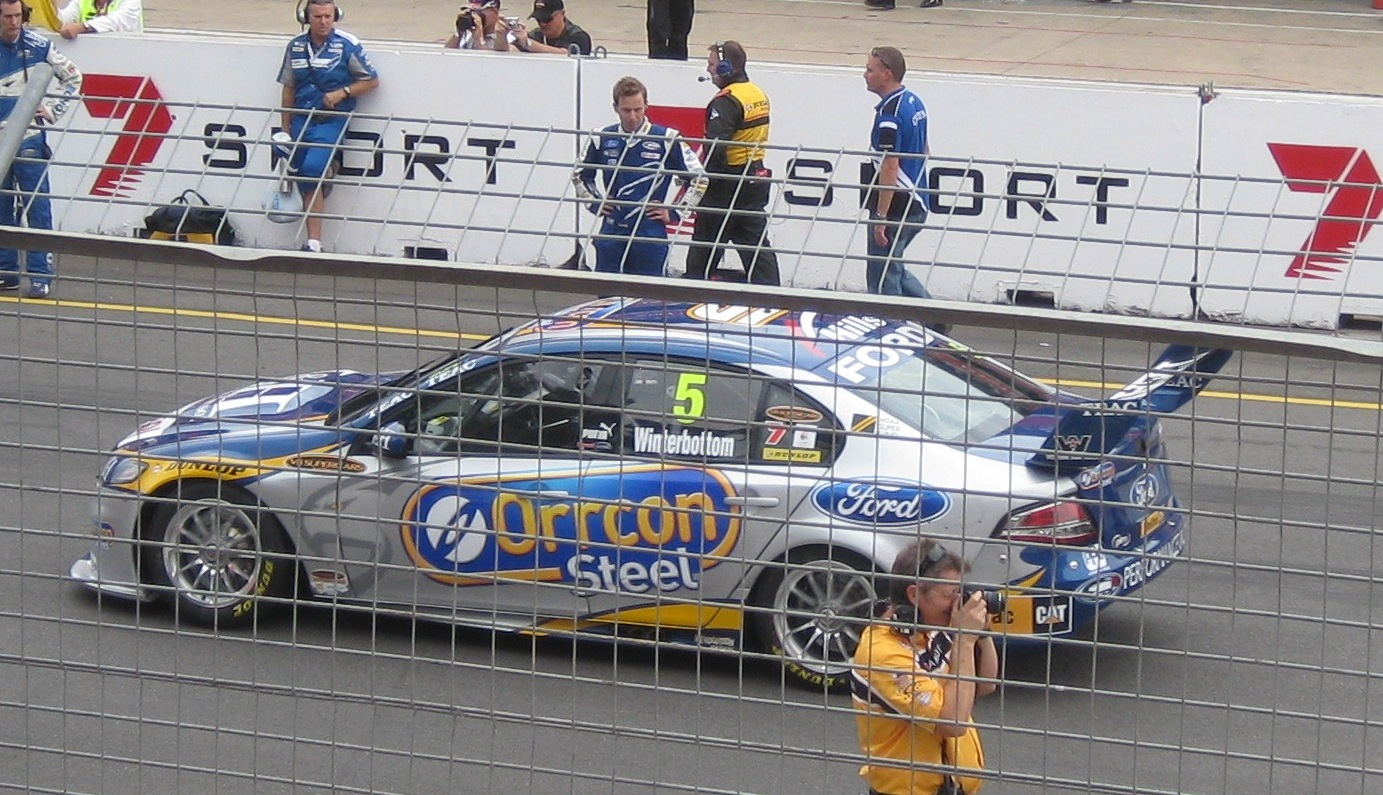
The Ford Performance Racing entered Ford FG Falcon of Mark Winterbottom at the 2010 Clipsal 500 Adelaide.

Winterbottom experienced a challenging season, finishing in fifth position in the championship, eight places ahead of team-mate Steven Richards. His highlights included an event win at the Gold Coast 600 and pole positions for Race 3 of the championship at the Hamilton 400 in New Zealand, and race 5 at Winton Motor Raceway. On both occasions, he had troublesome races which resulted in little or no points for the championship. In race 6 at Winton, Winterbottom recovered from the difficulties of race 5 to finish in second position. He also won a race at the V8 Supercars Challenge non-championship round at the Australian Grand Prix.

==== 2010 ====
In 2010, Winterbottom was a distant yet mathematical chance of winning the championship title heading into the final round, the Sydney 500. However a crash, which ironically also involved fellow contenders Whincup and James Courtney, in wet conditions in the Saturday race ruled Winterbottom out of the title race.

==== 2011 ====
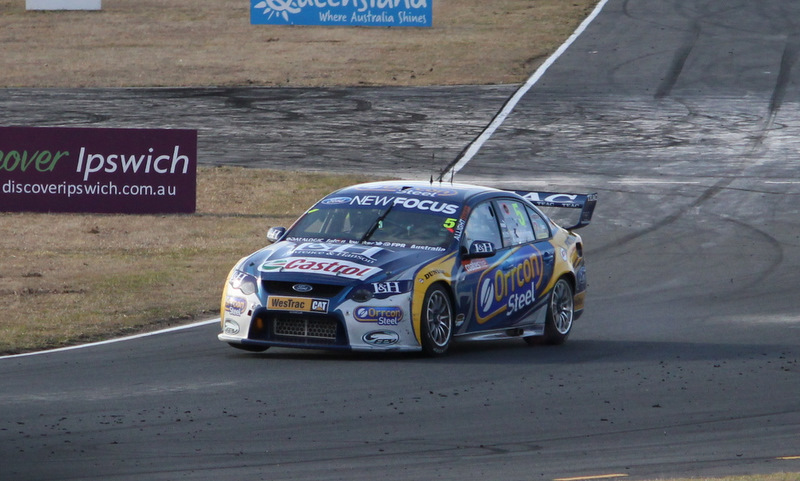
Winterbottom at the 2011 Ipswich 300

In 2011, Winterbottom finished a distant third to the Triple Eight Race Engineering cars. He scored two wins, at the Gold Coast 600 with international co-driver Richard Lyons and in the final race of the year at the Sydney 500.

==== 2012 ====
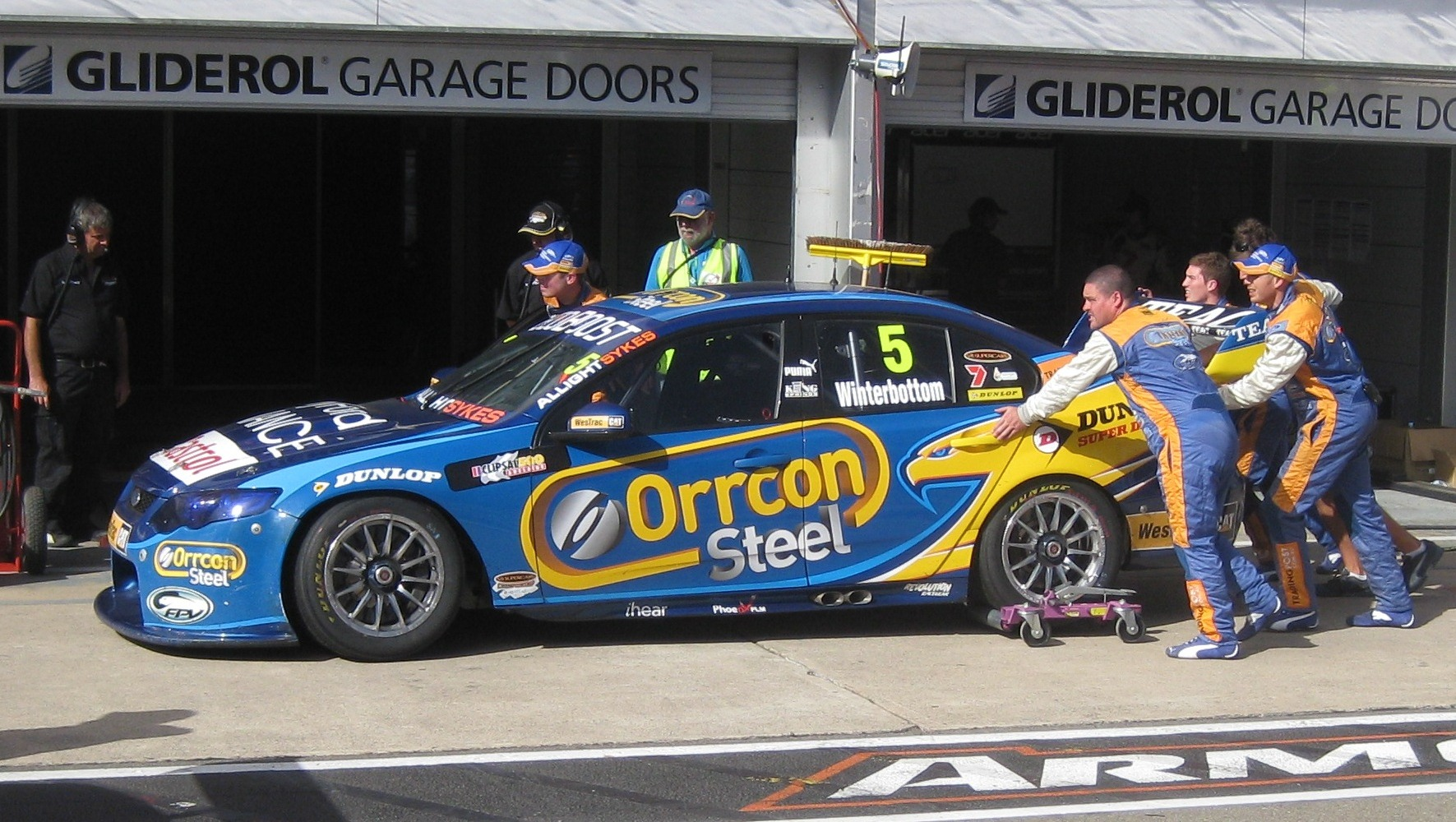
Winterbottom's Ford FG Falcon at the 2012 Clipsal 500 Adelaide

Winterbottom finished the season in third position, with three race wins in the middle of the season. Before the final round of the championship, the Sydney 500 on the Homebush Street Circuit, Winterbottom was in second, but fell behind Craig Lowndes to finish third. Winterbottom also claimed the coveted Barry Sheene Medal for the best and fairest driver in the series.

==== 2013 ====
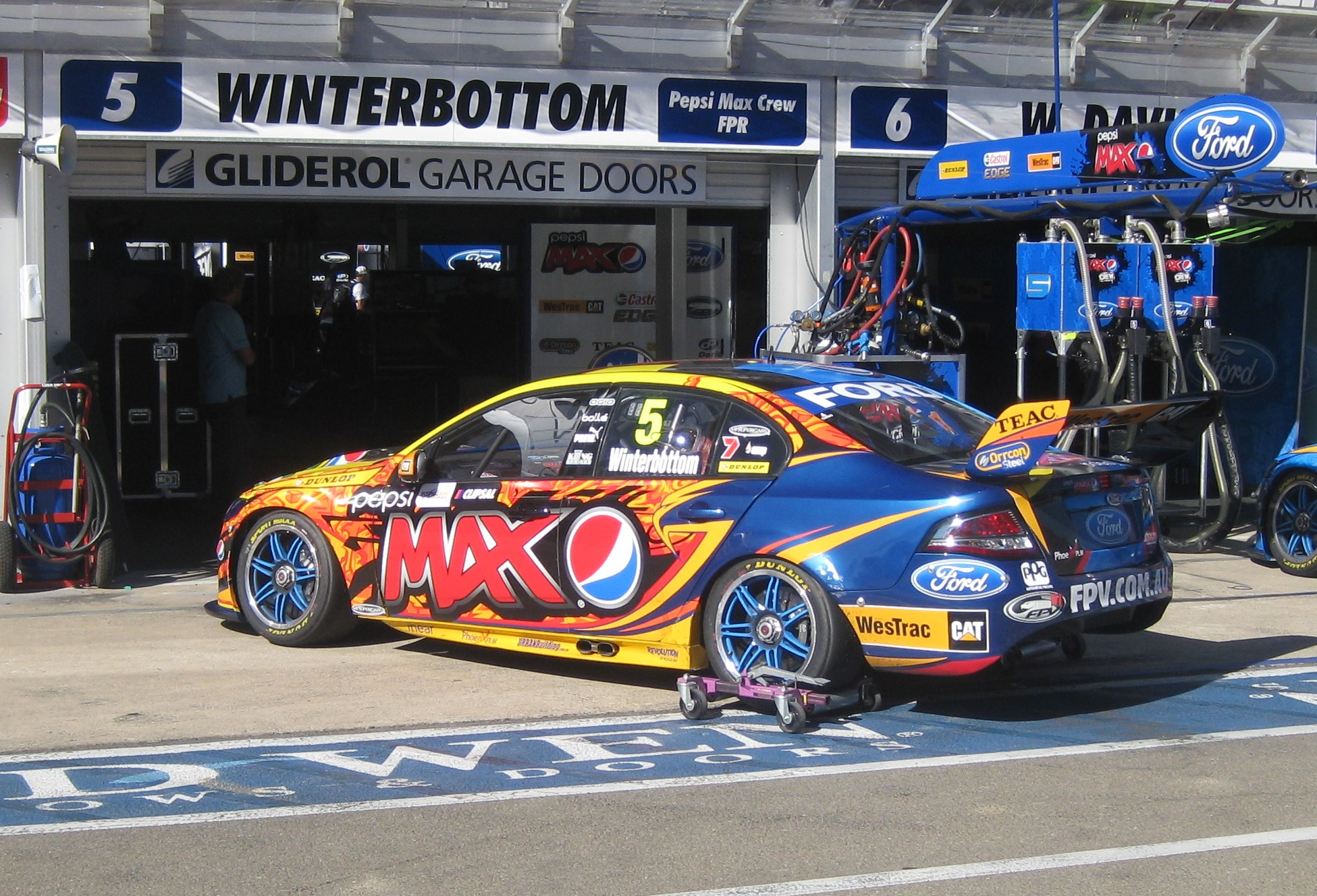
Winterbottom's Ford FG Falcon at the 2013 Clipsal 500 Adelaide

In 2013, Winterbottom won the Bathurst 1000 alongside ex-teammate Steven Richards on 13 October. However, due to a poor start to the championship, Winterbottom was only able to finish fourth in the championship, with three race wins. Teammate Will Davison finished narrowly ahead in third, aiding FPR's rise in the Teams' Championship to finish second for the first time.

==== 2014 ====
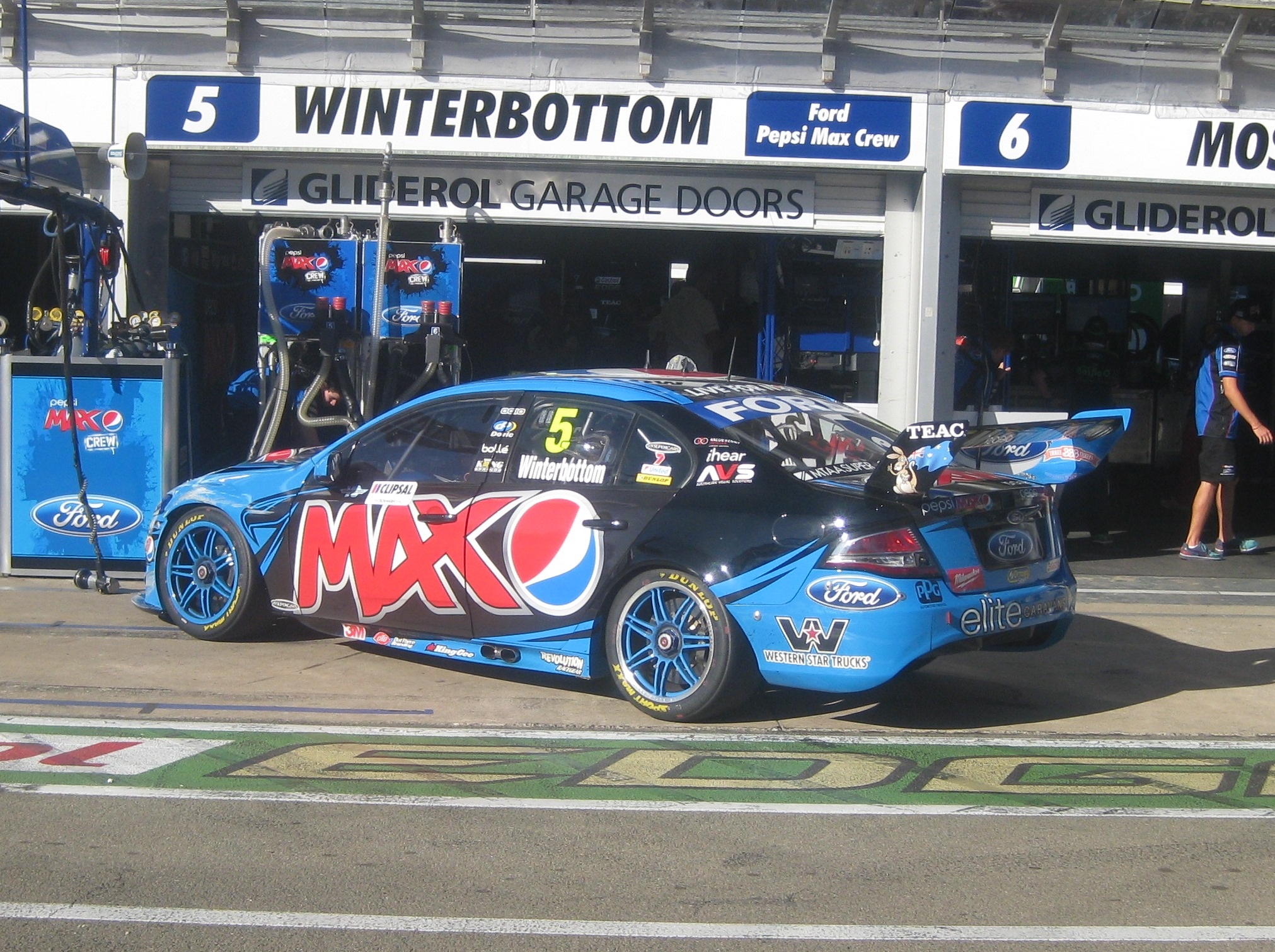
Winterbottom's Ford FG Falcon at the 2014 Clipsal 500 Adelaide

In 2014 Winterbottom started the season very well, leading the championship by 161 points after the 2014 Skycity Triple Crown in June. Despite high hopes of claiming his first title, Winterbottom's campaign ultimately crumbled against the Triple Eight juggernaut. He did not win another race after the Darwin round. At the 2014 Supercheap Auto Bathurst 1000, Winterbottom was a chance of going back-to-back late in the race, until an incident with an attacking Craig Lowndes resulted in him dropping back, and eventually recovering to take a fifth-place finish. As in 2012, going into the final round in Sydney, Winterbottom was second with Whincup in first and out of reach. However, Shane van Gisbergen won the Sunday race to demote Winterbottom to third in the standings.

=== Prodrive Racing Australia ===
==== 2015 ====
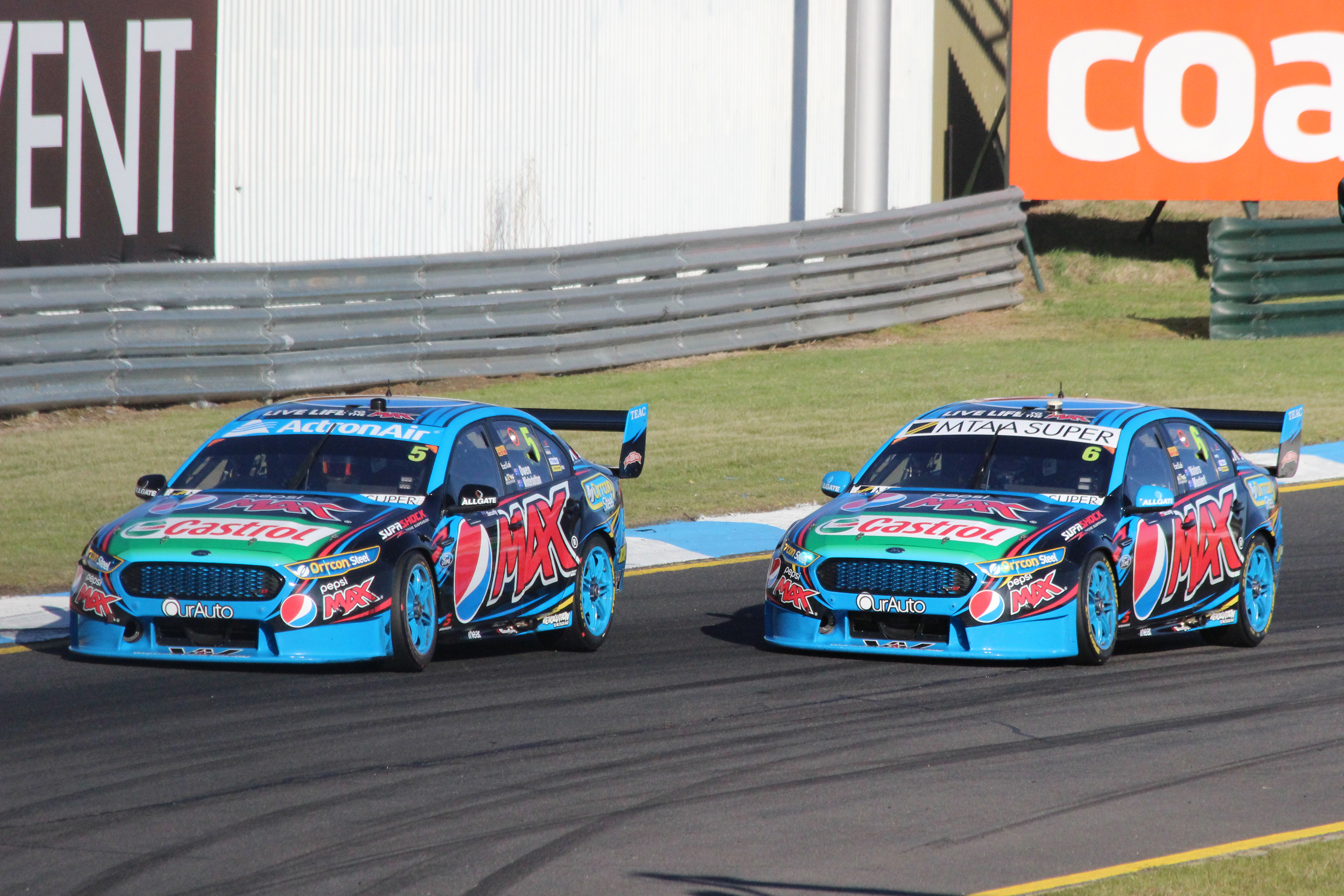
Winterbottom (left) racing Chaz Mostert (right) at the qualifying sprint race of the 2015 Sandown 500

In 2015, Prodrive Racing Australia (the new name for Ford Performance Racing, due to reduced support from Ford) debuted the Ford FG X Falcon, and it brought considerable success almost immediately, with Winterbottom taking four wins out of four races at the non-championship V8 Supercars Challenge event at the Australian Grand Prix. Winterbottom then achieved eight race wins in the middle part of the championship year, including a clean-sweep of the 2015 Castrol Edge Townsville 400. This resulted in Winterbottom taking a large championship lead into the endurance races. Driving with Steve Owen, Winterbottom then went on to increase his lead with his ninth win of the year at the 2015 Wilson Security Sandown 500, before finishing second at the 2015 Supercheap Auto Bathurst 1000. Despite not winning a race after Sandown, Winterbottom held on to secure his first championship title in a showdown against Craig Lowndes at the final round, the Sydney 500.

==== 2016 ====
Winterbottom had a slow start to his championship defence, not achieving a podium finish until the fifth race of the season at Symmons Plains. Winterbottom's first victory of the year was at the Perth SuperSprint, where on older tyres he held off Scott McLaughlin by under half a second. Two podiums at Winton gave Winterbottom the championship lead, before a poor event in Darwin dropped him back in the standings. Solid results at Townsville and Queensland Raceway followed, leaving Winterbottom third in the championship standings before the winter break. However, a decline in pace in the second half of the season left Winterbottom to finish sixth in the championship, with only one further race victory, at the Auckland SuperSprint.

==== 2017 ====
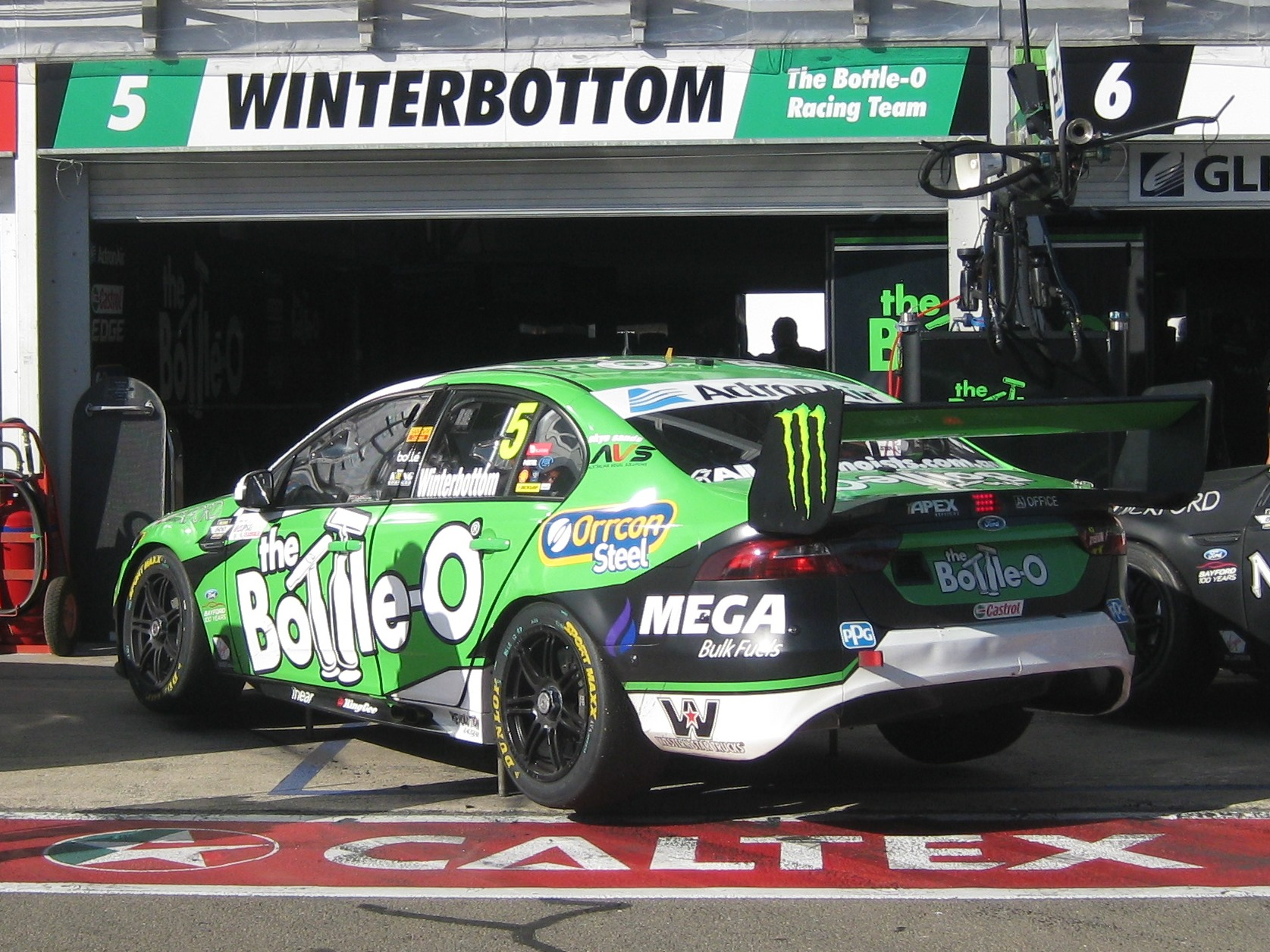
Winterbottom's Ford FG X Falcon at the 2017 Clipsal 500 Adelaide

2017 saw Winterbottom complete a winless year for the first time since moving to Ford Performance Racing in 2006. Highlights included podiums at the Phillip Island 500, Townsville 400 and Auckland SuperSprint, while the lowlight was crashing out of the Bathurst 1000 on the penultimate lap while battling for fifth place. Winterbottom secured sixth in the championship for the second consecutive year, albeit only after Craig Lowndes' late retirement at the season-ending Newcastle 500.

=== Tickford Racing ===
==== 2018 ====
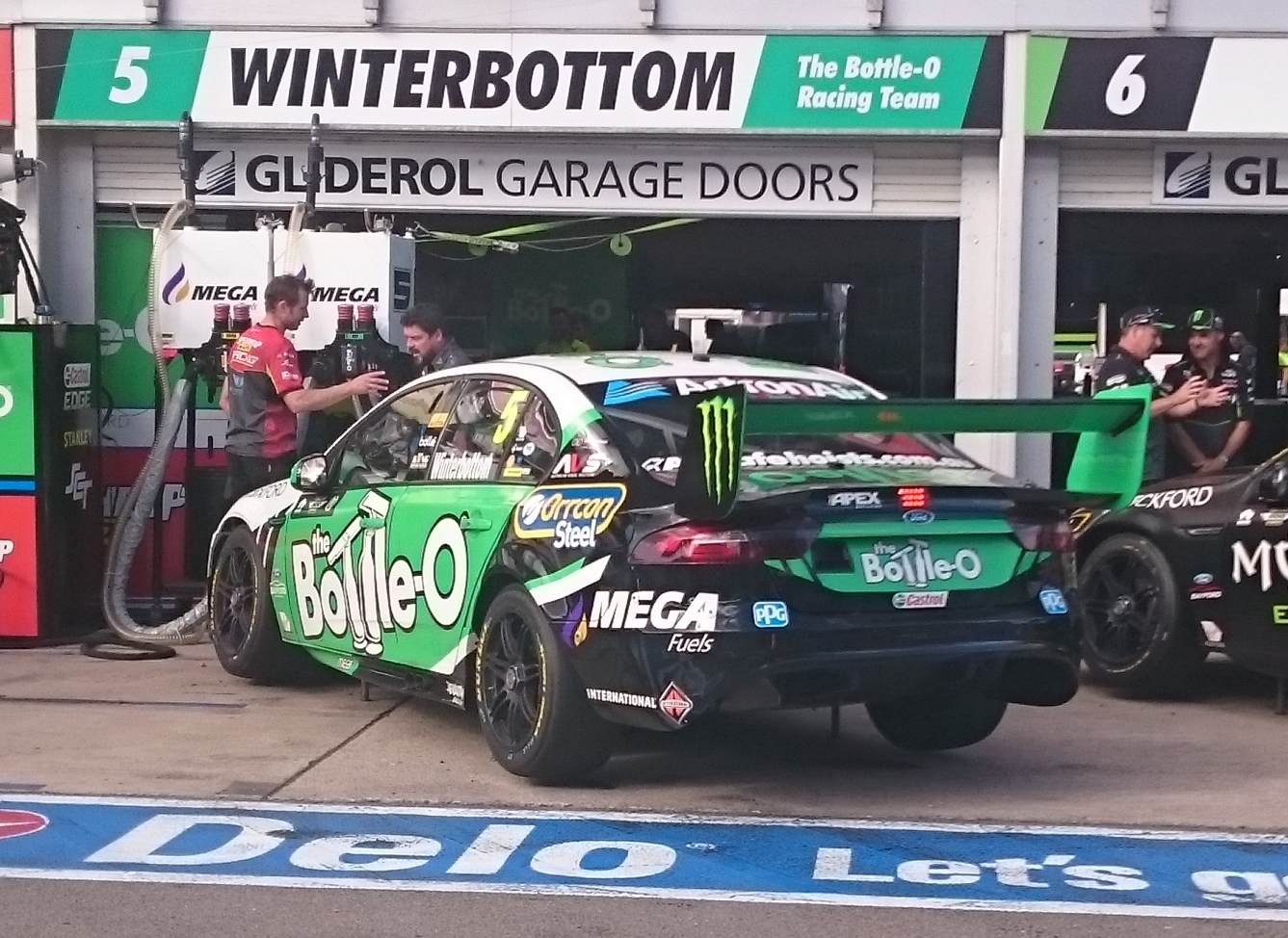
Winterbottom's Ford FG X Falcon at the 2018 Adelaide 500

In 2018, Prodrive Racing Australia was again renamed, to Tickford Racing, and Winterbottom began the year with a top five Saturday result at the Adelaide 500 before a pit lane penalty dropped him down the field in the Sunday race. His fortunes did not improve, with Tickford Racing enduring a difficult start to the season until Winterbottom scored both his and Tickford Racing's first race podium of the year at the fifth event at Barbagallo. It was confirmed on 1 November that Winterbottom would leave Tickford Racing at the end of the 2018 season, after 13 years with the team. Despite a difficult final season with the team, in which he finished only 12th in the championship, Winterbottom left the team with a record of 412 race starts, 38 wins, 35 poles and 117 podiums.

=== Team 18 ===
Winterbottom announced ahead of the 2018 Newcastle 500 that he would be moving to Team 18 in 2019, the first time he would drive a Holden in his career. Winterbottom achieved Team 18's first ever race victory in 2023 at the Darwin Triple Crown.

At the end of 2024, after six year with the team, Winterbottom was replaced at Team 18 by Anton De Pasquale. Winterbottom found himself without a full time drive for 2025, after failed contract talks with PremiAir Racing and Brad Jones Racing.

=== Return to Tickford Racing (co-driver) ===
Following the end of Winterbottom's full-time career in the championship, Winterbottom returned to Tickford Racing for 2025 as a co-driver to Cam Waters in the endurance leg of the season. Waters and Winterbottom achieved a second place finish at The Bend 500.

Winterbottom returned to partner Waters at Tickford in 2026, however he was called up to race Thomas Randle's car in the final race of the Darwin Triple Crown, after Randle had felt unwell after qualifying. Winterbottom received the news he would be racing an hour before the start, while he was working on commentary for the Super2 Series support race.

=== Stock Car Brasil ===
In 2014 and 2015, Winterbottom appeared in the season-opening two-driver round of the Stock Car Brasil championship, for Voxx Racing. In 2014, he drove alongside Sérgio Jimenez to fourth at the Autódromo José Carlos Pace whilst in 2015 he finished second with Marcos Gomes at the Autódromo Internacional Ayrton Senna. Just like Winterbottom, Gomes went on to win his respective championship title in 2015. Winterbottom returned to Brazil in 2018, finishing eleventh at the Autódromo José Carlos Pace driving with Átila Abreu, despite starting from the rear of the grid.

At the conclusion of his Tickford Racing stint, Winterbottom had received an offer to contest the championship full-time in 2019. Having described the opportunity as "appealing", he declined on the grounds that it wasn't a binding contract.

== Personal life ==
Winterbottom is the son of the 1969 and 1974 Australian Sprintcar Champion and former chairman of the Sprintcar Control Council of Australia, Jim Winterbottom. Educated at Doonside Technology High School, Winterbottom took up the sport of soccer from the age of six, and by eleven was competing with a state level team, (Blacktown United) in matches across New South Wales. He made the decision to give up soccer to pursue his motor racing ambitions at the age of eleven.

Winterbottom voiced Frosty Winterbumper in the Australian release of the 2011 Pixar film Cars 2. He also appeared as a contestant on Season 3 of the Seven Network's celebrity series Australia's Greatest Athlete in 2011.

In 2015, Winterbottom played in the EJ Whitten Legends Game, an Australian rules football charity match to raise money and awareness for prostate cancer. He trained with the Essendon Football Club in the lead up to the match, with Winterbottom being a supporter of the club in the Australian Football League.

== Career results ==
=== Karting career summary ===
Season	Series	Position
1995	Australian National Sprint Kart Championships - Junior National Light	1st
1996	Australian National Sprint Kart Championships - Junior National Light	1st
1997	Australian National Sprint Kart Championships - Clubman Light	1st
1998	Knoxville State Karting Championship	1st
1999	Australian National Sprint Kart Championships - Formula Yamaha Light	1st
2000	Australian National Sprint Kart Championships - Formula Yamaha Light	1st
2001	Ford Kartstars Series	1st
2001	Australian National Sprint Kart Championships - Clubman Light	1st
2001	Australian Formula A Kart Champion - Rotax 125cc	1st

=== Circuit racing career ===
Season	Series	Position	Car	Team
2001	Australian Formula Ford Championship	17th	Spectrum 06b Ford	Bosch Batteries
2001	Victorian Formula Ford Championship	7th	Spectrum 06 Ford	
2002	Australian Formula Ford Championship	2nd	Spectrum 09 Ford	Borland Racing Developments
2003	Konica V8 Supercar Series	1st	Ford AU Falcon	Stone Brothers Racing
2003	V8 Supercar Championship Series	44th	Ford BA Falcon	Stone Brothers Racing
2004	V8 Supercar Championship Series	18th	Ford BA Falcon	Larkham Motor Sport
2005	V8 Supercar Championship Series	29th	Ford BA Falcon	Larkham Motor Sport
2006	V8 Supercar Championship Series	3rd	Ford BA Falcon	Ford Performance Racing
2007	V8 Supercar Championship Series	5th	Ford BF Falcon	Ford Performance Racing
2008	V8 Supercar Championship Series	2nd	Ford BF Falcon	Ford Performance Racing
2009	V8 Supercar Championship Series	5th	Ford FG Falcon	Ford Performance Racing
2010	V8 Supercar Championship Series	3rd	Ford FG Falcon	Ford Performance Racing
2011	International V8 Supercars Championship	3rd	Ford FG Falcon	Ford Performance Racing
2012	International V8 Supercars Championship	3rd	Ford FG Falcon	Ford Performance Racing
2013	International V8 Supercars Championship	4th	Ford FG Falcon	Ford Performance Racing
2014	International V8 Supercars Championship	3rd	Ford FG Falcon	Ford Performance Racing
2015	International V8 Supercars Championship	1st	Ford FG X Falcon	Prodrive Racing Australia
2016	International V8 Supercars Championship	6th	Ford FG X Falcon	Prodrive Racing Australia
2017	Virgin Australia Supercars Championship	6th	Ford FG X Falcon	Prodrive Racing Australia
2018	Virgin Australia Supercars Championship	12th	Ford FG X Falcon	Tickford Racing
2019	Virgin Australia Supercars Championship	13th	Holden ZB Commodore	Team 18
2020	Virgin Australia Supercars Championship	10th	Holden ZB Commodore	Team 18
2021	Repco Supercars Championship	10th	Holden ZB Commodore	Team 18
2022	Repco Supercars Championship	9th	Holden ZB Commodore	Team 18
2023	Repco Supercars Championship	15th	Chevrolet Camaro ZL1	Team 18

=== Super2 Series results ===
Super2 Series results
Year	Team	No.	Car	1	2	3	4	5	6	7	8	9	10	11	12	13	14	15	16	Position	Points
2003	Stone Brothers Racing	41	Ford AU Falcon	WAK; R1; 1	WAK; R2; 6	WAK; R3; 1	ADE; R4; 1	EAS; R5; 3	EAS; R6; 1	EAS; R7; 2	PHI; R8; 1	PHI; R9; 6	PHI; R10; 7	WIN; R11; 13	WIN; R12; 3	WIN; R13; 2	MAL; R14; 1	MAL; R15; 1	MAL; R16; 1	1st	922

=== Supercars Championship results ===
Supercars results
Year	Team	No.	Car	1	2	3	4	5	6	7	8	9	10	11	12	13	14	15	16	17	18	19	20	21	22	23	24	25	26	27	28	29	30	31	32	33	34	35	36	37	38	39	Position	Points
2003	Stone Brothers Racing	9	Ford BA Falcon	ADE; R1	ADE; R1	PHI; R3	EAS; R4	WIN; R5	BAR; R6	BAR; R7	BAR; R8	HDV; R9	HDV; R10	HDV; R11	QLD; R12	ORA; R13	SAN; R14; 11	BAT; R15; Ret	SUR; R16	SUR; R17	PUK; R18	PUK; R19	PUK; R20	EAS; R21	EAS; R22																		44th	152
2004	Larkham Motor Sport	20	Ford BA Falcon	ADE; R1; 15	ADE; R2; Ret	EAS; R3; 12	PUK; R4; 25	PUK; R5; 14	PUK; R6; Ret	HDV; R7; 11	HDV; R8; 10	HDV; R9; 23	BAR; R10; 19	BAR; R11; 16	BAR; R12; 15	QLD; R13; 21	WIN; R14; 25	ORA; R15; 23	ORA; R16; Ret	SAN; R17; 6	BAT; R18; 5	SUR; R19; 16	SUR; R20; 12	SYM; R21; 19	SYM; R22; 17	SYM; R23; 11	EAS; R24; 28	EAS; R25; 22	EAS; R26; 33														18th	1190
2005	Larkham Motor Sport	20	Ford BA Falcon	ADE; R1; 24	ADE; R2; 14	PUK; R3; 24	PUK; R4; 22	PUK; R5; 17	BAR; R6; 20	BAR; R7; 27	BAR; R8; 21	EAS; R9; 23	EAS; R10; Ret	SHA; R11; Ret	SHA; R12; DNS	SHA; R13; DNS	HDV; R14; 24	HDV; R15; 27	HDV; R16; 20	QLD; R17; 25	ORA; R18; Ret	ORA; R19; 27	SAN; R20; 16	BAT; R21; Ret																			29th	668
2005	Larkham Motor Sport	10	Ford BA Falcon																						SUR; R22; 21	SUR; R23; 29	SUR; R24; 26	SYM; R25; 21	SYM; R26; 22	SYM; R27; 25	PHI; R28; 19	PHI; R29; 20	PHI; R30; 25										29th	668
2006	Ford Performance Racing	5	Ford BA Falcon	ADE; R1; 22	ADE; R2; 19	PUK; R3; 4	PUK; R4; 3	PUK; R5; 3	BAR; R6; 6	BAR; R7; 13	BAR; R8; 3	WIN; R9; 8	WIN; R10; 12	WIN; R11; 6	HDV; R12; 3	HDV; R13; 17	HDV; R14; 8	QLD; R15; 9	QLD; R16; 7	QLD; R17; 9	ORA; R18; 7	ORA; R19; 15	ORA; R20; 11	SAN; R21; 1	BAT; R22; Ret	SUR; R23; 3	SUR; R24; 3	SUR; R25; 3	SYM; R26; 2	SYM; R27; 2	SYM; R28; 3	BHR; R29; 8	BHR; R30; 3	BHR; R31; 27	PHI; R32; 7	PHI; R33; 2	PHI; R34; 1						3rd	3089
2007	Ford Performance Racing	5	Ford BF Falcon	ADE; R1; 5	ADE; R2; Ret	BAR; R3; 10	BAR; R4; 6	BAR; R5; 5	PUK; R6; 2	PUK; R7; 23	PUK; R8; 11	WIN; R9; 26	WIN; R10; 20	WIN; R11; 10	EAS; R12; 11	EAS; R13; 7	EAS; R14; 6	HDV; R15; Ret	HDV; R16; 6	HDV; R17; 6	QLD; R18; 10	QLD; R19; 7	QLD; R20; 5	ORA; R21; 4	ORA; R22; 3	ORA; R23; 24	SAN; R24; 8	BAT; R25; 10	SUR; R26; 20	SUR; R27; 17	SUR; R28; 5	BHR; R29; 1	BHR; R30; 1	BHR; R31; 3	SYM; R32; 3	SYM; R33; 3	SYM; R34; 7	PHI; R35; 7	PHI; R36; 4	PHI; R37; 5			5th	420
2008	Ford Performance Racing	5	Ford BF Falcon	ADE; R1; 2	ADE; R2; Ret	EAS; R3; 10	EAS; R4; 2	EAS; R5; 1	HAM; R6; 10	HAM; R7; 7	HAM; R8; 5	BAR; R29; 1	BAR; R10; 1	BAR; R11; 1	SAN; R12; 2	SAN; R13; 6	SAN; R14; 2	HDV; R15; 1	HDV; R16; 3	HDV; R17; 2	QLD; R18; 2	QLD; R19; 1	QLD; R20; 1	WIN; R21; 21	WIN; R22; 2	WIN; R23; 26	PHI; QR; 12	PHI; R24; 4	BAT; R25; 4	SUR; R26; 3	SUR; R27; 3	SUR; R28; 3	BHR; R29; 21	BHR; R30; 4	BHR; R31; 4	SYM; R32; 3	SYM; R33; 4	SYM; R34; 4	ORA; R35; 23	ORA; R36; 12	ORA; R37; 18		2nd	3079
2009	Ford Performance Racing	5	Ford FG Falcon	ADE; R1; 18	ADE; R2; 22	HAM; R3; 2	HAM; R4; Ret	WIN; R5; 25	WIN; R6; 2	SYM; R7; 16	SYM; R8; 4	HDV; R9; 2	HDV; R10; 17	TOW; R11; 8	TOW; R12; 6	SAN; R13; 12	SAN; R14; 16	QLD; R15; 3	QLD; R16; 4	PHI; QR; 1	PHI; R17; 3	BAT; R18; Ret	SUR; R19; 1	SUR; R20; 2	SUR; R21; 2	SUR; R22; 1	PHI; R23; 6	PHI; R24; Ret	BAR; R25; 3	BAR; R26; 17	SYD; R27; 2	SYD; R28; 3											5th	2414
2010	Ford Performance Racing	5	Ford FG Falcon	YMC; R1; 3	YMC; R2; 2	BHR; R3; 2	BHR; R4; 2	ADE; R5; 21	ADE; R6; 3	HAM; R7; 7	HAM; R8; DSQ	QLD; R9; 9	QLD; R10; Ret	WIN; R11; 15	WIN; R12; 6	HDV; R13; 1	HDV; R14; 2	TOW; R15; 3	TOW; R16; 1	PHI; QR; 7	PHI; R17; 2	BAT; R18; 9	SUR; R19; 21	SUR; R20; 3	SYM; R21; 5	SYM; R22; 1	SAN; R23; 3	SAN; R24; 2	SYD; R25; Ret	SYD; R26; Ret													3rd	2729
2011	Ford Performance Racing	5	Ford FG Falcon	YMC; R1; 3	YMC; R2; 14	ADE; R3; 6	ADE; R4; 3	HAM; R5; 4	HAM; R6; Ret	BAR; R7; 8	BAR; R8; 13	BAR; R9; 26	WIN; R10; 9	WIN; R11; 19	HID; R12; 15	HID; R13; 3	TOW; R14; 5	TOW; R15; 3	QLD; R16; 13	QLD; R17; 10	QLD; R18; 19	PHI; R19; 17	BAT; R20; 4	SUR; R21; 3	SUR; R22; 1	SYM; R23; 4	SYM; R24; 3	SAN; R25; 7	SAN; R26; 2	SYD; R27; 5	SYD; R28; 1												3rd	2710
2012	Ford Performance Racing	5	Ford FG Falcon	ADE; R1; 9	ADE; R2; 2	SYM; R3; 2	SYM; R4; 5	HAM; R5; 23	HAM; R6; 1	BAR; R7; 1	BAR; R8; 3	BAR; R9; 2	PHI; R10; 1	PHI; R11; 6	HID; R12; 3	HID; R13; 3	TOW; R14; 2	TOW; R15; 5	QLD; R16; 2	QLD; R17; 2	SMP; R18; 2	SMP; R19; 3	SAN; QR; 16	SAN; R20; 2	BAT; R21; 11	SUR; R22; 3	SUR; R23; 3	YMC; R24; 6	YMC; R25; 4	YMC; R26; 5	WIN; R27; 4	WIN; R28; 2	SYD; R29; 9	SYD; R30; 18									3rd	3457
2013	Ford Performance Racing	5	Ford FG Falcon	ADE; R1; Ret	ADE; R2; 5	SYM; R3; 3	SYM; R4; 6	SYM; R5; 2	PUK; R6; 19	PUK; R7; 13	PUK; R8; 23	PUK; R9; 24	BAR; R10; 3	BAR; R11; 3	BAR; R12; 12	COA; R13; 8	COA; R14; 6	COA; R15; 7	COA; R16; 6	HID; R17; 22	HID; R18; 1	HID; R19; 2	TOW; R20; 2	TOW; R21; 4	QLD; R22; 3	QLD; R23; 10	QLD; R24; 3	WIN; R25; 4	WIN; R26; 1	WIN; R27; 17	SAN; QR; 4	SAN; R28; 6	BAT; R29; 1	SUR; R30; 3	SUR; R31; 18	PHI; R32; 5	PHI; R33; 7	PHI; R34; 2	SYD; R35; Ret	SYD; R36; 6			4th	2793
2014	Ford Performance Racing	5	Ford FG Falcon	ADE; R1; 4	ADE; R2; 4	ADE; R3; 12	SYM; R4; 3	SYM; R5; 2	SYM; R6; 9	WIN; R7; 7	WIN; R8; 2	WIN; R9; 1	PUK; R10; 13	PUK; R11; 1	PUK; R12; 2	PUK; R13; 1	BAR; R14; 4	BAR; R15; 2	BAR; R16; 3	HID; R17; 6	HID; R18; 6	HID; R19; 1	TOW; R20; 11	TOW; R21; 8	TOW; R22; 6	QLD; R23; 6	QLD; R24; 6	QLD; R25; 22	SMP; R26; 11	SMP; R27; 12	SMP; R28; 20	SAN; QR; 3	SAN; R29; 10	BAT; R30; 6	SUR; R31; 4	SUR; R32; 13	PHI; R33; 23	PHI; R34; 3	PHI; R35; 3	SYD; R36; 23	SYD; R37; 5	SYD; R38; 19	3rd	2768
2015	Prodrive Racing Australia	5	Ford FG X Falcon	ADE; R1; 5	ADE; R2; 11	ADE; R3; 5	SYM; R4; 2	SYM; R5; 6	SYM; R6; 5	BAR; R7; 1	BAR; R8; 1	BAR; R9; 15	WIN; R10; 2	WIN; R11; 1	WIN; R12; 1	HID; R13; 2	HID; R14; 7	HID; R15; 5	TOW; R16; 1	TOW; R17; 1	QLD; R18; 1	QLD; R19; 1	QLD; R20; 3	SMP; R21; 2	SMP; R22; 8	SMP; R23; 16	SAN; QR; 2	SAN; R24; 1	BAT; R25; 2	SUR; R26; 23	SUR; R27; 11	PUK; R28; 7	PUK; R29; 4	PUK; R30; 11	PHI; R31; 7	PHI; R32; 4	PHI; R33; 4	SYD; R34; 5	SYD; R35; 3	SYD; R36; 4			1st	3246
2016	Prodrive Racing Australia	1	Ford FG X Falcon	ADE; R1; 8	ADE; R2; 11	ADE; R3; 9	SYM; R4; 9	SYM; R5; 3	PHI; R6; 5	PHI; R7; 2	BAR; R8; 22	BAR; R9; 1	WIN; R10; 3	WIN; R11; 2	HID; R12; 9	HID; R13; 20	TOW; R14; 3	TOW; R15; 3	QLD; R16; 4	QLD; R17; 5	SMP; R18; 11	SMP; R19; 14	SAN; QR; 22	SAN; R20; 23	BAT; R21; Ret	SUR; R22; 4	SUR; R23; 5	PUK; R24; 4	PUK; R25; 5	PUK; R26; 1	PUK; R27; 5	SYD; R28; 23	SYD; R29; 12										6th	2489
2017	Prodrive Racing Australia	5	Ford FG X Falcon	ADE; R1; 15	ADE; R2; 14	SYM; R3; 7	SYM; R4; 13	PHI; R5; 8	PHI; R6; 2	BAR; R7; 5	BAR; R8; 4	WIN; R9; 9	WIN; R10; 13	HID; R11; 14	HID; R12; 14	TOW; R13; 3	TOW; R14; 4	QLD; R15; 9	QLD; R16; 10	SMP; R17; 4	SMP; R18; 19	SAN; QR; 9	SAN; R19; 9	BAT; R20; Ret	SUR; R21; 8	SUR; R22; 5	PUK; R23; 2	PUK; R24; 19	NEW; R25; 17	NEW; R26; 7													6th	2208
2018	Tickford Racing	5	Ford FG X Falcon	ADE; R1; 5	ADE; R2; 13	MEL; R3; 14	MEL; R4; 9	MEL; R5; 7	MEL; R6; 17	SYM; R7; 14	SYM; R8; 12	PHI; R9; 13	PHI; R10; 15	BAR; R11; 2	BAR; R12; 21	WIN; R13; 10	WIN; R14; 20	HID; R15; 20	HID; R16; 13	TOW; R17; 6	TOW; R18; 12	QLD; R19; 20	QLD; R20; 26	SMP; R21; 15	BEN; R22; 5	BEN; R23; 16	SAN; QR; 5	SAN; R24; 17	BAT; R25; 12	SUR; R26; 7	SUR; R27; C	PUK; R28; 13	PUK; R29; 9	NEW; R30; 6	NEW; R31; 13								12th	2192
2019	Team 18	18	Holden ZB Commodore	ADE; R1; 9	ADE; R2; 6	MEL; R3; 12	MEL; R4; 11	MEL; R5; 13	MEL; R6; 6	SYM; R7; 4	SYM; R8; 6	PHI; R9; 21	PHI; R10; 17	BAR; R11; 18	BAR; R12; 15	WIN; R13; 9	WIN; R14; 22	HID; R15; 17	HID; R16; 12	TOW; R17; 9	TOW; R18; Ret	QLD; R19; 15	QLD; R20; 10	BEN; R21; 4	BEN; R22; 23	PUK; R23; 22	PUK; R24; 8	BAT; R25; 6	SUR; R26; 12	SUR; R27; 19	SAN; QR; 15	SAN; R28; 12	NEW; R29; 10	NEW; R30; 14									13th	2092
2020	Team 18	18	Holden ZB Commodore	ADE; R1; 8	ADE; R2; 11	MEL; R3; C	MEL; R4; C	MEL; R5; C	MEL; R6; C	SMP1; R7; 9	SMP1; R8; 8	SMP1; R9; 5	SMP2; R10; 10	SMP2; R11; 14	SMP2; R12; 6	HID1; R13; 4	HID1; R14; 11	HID1; R15; 7	HID2; R16; 11	HID2; R17; 9	HID2; R18; 4	TOW1; R19; 12	TOW1; R20; 17	TOW1; R21; 10	TOW2; R22; 14	TOW2; R23; 9	TOW2; R24; 13	BEN1; R25; 17	BEN1; R26; 15	BEN1; R27; Ret	BEN2; R28; 8	BEN2; R29; 12	BEN2; R30; 16	BAT; R31; 8									10th	1566
2021	Team 18	18	Holden ZB Commodore	BAT1; R1; 4	BAT1; R2; 5	SAN; R3; 4	SAN; R4; 11	SAN; R5; 10	SYM; R6; 7	SYM; R7; 7	SYM; R8; 11	BEN; R9; 25	BEN; R10; 9	BEN; R11; 18	HID; R12; 22	HID; R13; 5	HID; R14; 7	TOW1; R15; 10	TOW1; R16; 16	TOW2; R17; 20	TOW2; R18; 10	TOW2; R19; 8	SMP1; R20; 12	SMP1; R21; 17	SMP1; R22; 10	SMP2; R23; 18	SMP2; R24; 10	SMP2; R25; 15	SMP3; R26; 13	SMP3; R27; 6	SMP3; R28; 19	SMP4; R29; 12	SMP4; R30; C	BAT2; R31; 16									10th	1725
2022	Team 18	18	Holden ZB Commodore	SMP; R1; 16	SMP; R2; 12	SYM; R3; 18	SYM; R4; 6	SYM; R5; 7	MEL; R6; 7	MEL; R7; 12	MEL; R8; 17	MEL; R9; 9	BAR; R10; 14	BAR; R11; 16	BAR; R12; 20	WIN; R13; 21	WIN; R14; 9	WIN; R15; 9	HID; R16; 5	HID; R17; 7	HID; R18; 9	TOW; R19; 25	TOW; R20; 10	BEN; R21; 16	BEN; R22; 9	BEN; R23; 15	SAN; R24; 8	SAN; R25; 12	SAN; R26; 5	PUK; R27; 11	PUK; R28; 22	PUK; R29; 12	BAT; R30; 15	SUR; R31; 9	SUR; R32; 6	ADE; R33; 6	ADE; R34; 11						9th	1909
2023	Team 18	18	Chevrolet Camaro ZL1	NEW; R1; 6	NEW; R2; 10	MEL; R3; 21	MEL; R4; 9	MEL; R5; Ret	MEL; R6; 19	BAR; R7; 18	BAR; R8; 18	BAR; R9; 19	SYM; R10; 12	SYM; R11; 13	SYM; R12; 8	HID; R13; 1	HID; R14; 18	HID; R15; 7	TOW; R16; 11	TOW; R17; 7	SMP; R18; 9	SMP; R19; 9	BEN; R20; 17	BEN; R21; 17	BEN; R22; 24	SAN; R23; 11	BAT; R24; DNF	SUR; R25; 12	SUR; R26; 9	ADE; R27; 11	ADE; R28; 15												15th	1579
2024	Team 18	18	Chevrolet Camaro ZL1	BAT1; R1; 12	BAT1; R2; 14	MEL; R3; 11	MEL; R4; 2	MEL; R5; 13	MEL; R6; 13	TAU; R7; 11	TAU; R8; 17	WAN; R9; 16	WAN; R10; 20	HID; R11; 2	HID; R12; 19	TOW; R13; 13	TOW; R14; 8	SMP; R15; 24	SMP; R16; 13	SYM; R17; 18	SYM; R18; 9	SAN; R19; 16	BAT2; R20; 18	SUR; R21; 13	SUR; R22; 12	ADE; R23; 17	ADE; R24; 20																15th	1557
2025	Tickford Racing	6	Ford Mustang S650	SYD; R1	SYD; R2	SYD; R3	MEL; R4	MEL; R5	MEL; R6	MEL; R7	TAU; R8	TAU; R9	TAU; R10	SYM; R11	SYM; R12	SYM; R13	BAR; R14	BAR; R15	BAR; R16	HID; R17	HID; R18	HID; R19	TOW; R20	TOW; R21	TOW; R22	QLD; R23	QLD; R24	QLD; R25	BEN; R26; 2	BAT; R27; 12	SUR; R28	SUR; R29	SAN; R30	SAN; R31	ADE; R32	ADE; R33	ADE; R34						26th*	276*
2026	Tickford Racing	55	Ford Mustang S650	SMP; R1	SMP; R2	SMP; R3	MEL; R4	MEL; R5	MEL; R6	MEL; R7	TAU; R8	TAU; R9	CHR; R10	CHR; R11	CHR; R12	CHR; R13	SYM; R14	SYM; R15	SYM; R16	HID; R20	HID; R21	HID; R22; 22	TOW; R23	TOW; R24	TOW; R25	BAR; R17	BAR; R18	BAR; R19	QLD; R26	QLD; R27	QLD; R28	BEN; R28	BAT; R30	SUR; R31	SUR; R32	SAN; R33	SAN; R34	ADE; R35	ADE; R36	ADE; R37			28th*	21*

=== Complete Bathurst 1000 results ===
Year	Team	Car	Co-driver	Position	Laps
2003	Stone Brothers Racing	Ford Falcon BA	(Australia) Mark Noske	DNF	102
2004	Larkham Motorsport	Ford Falcon BA	(Australia) Jason Bargwanna	5th	161
2005	Larkham Motorsport	Ford Falcon BA	(Australia) Jason Bargwanna	DNF	122
2006	Ford Performance Racing	Ford Falcon BA	(Australia) Jason Bright	DNF	28
2007	Ford Performance Racing	Ford Falcon BF	(New Zealand) Steven Richards	10th	161
2008	Ford Performance Racing	Ford Falcon BF	(New Zealand) Steven Richards	4th	161
2009	Ford Performance Racing	Ford Falcon FG	(New Zealand) Steven Richards	DNF	49
2010	Ford Performance Racing	Ford Falcon FG	(Australia) Luke Youlden	9th	161
2011	Ford Performance Racing	Ford Falcon FG	(New Zealand) Steven Richards	4th	161
2012	Ford Performance Racing	Ford Falcon FG	(New Zealand) Steven Richards	11th	161
2013	Ford Performance Racing	Ford Falcon FG	(New Zealand) Steven Richards	1st	161
2014	Ford Performance Racing	Ford Falcon FG	(Australia) Steve Owen	6th	161
2015	Prodrive Racing Australia	Ford Falcon FG X	(Australia) Steve Owen	2nd	161
2016	Prodrive Racing Australia	Ford Falcon FG X	(Australia) Dean Canto	DNF	132
2017	Prodrive Racing Australia	Ford Falcon FG X	(Australia) Dean Canto	DNF	159
2018	Tickford Racing	Ford Falcon FG X	(Australia) Dean Canto	12th	161
2019	Charlie Schwerkolt Racing	Holden Commodore ZB	(New Zealand) Steven Richards	6th	161
2020	Charlie Schwerkolt Racing	Holden Commodore ZB	(Australia) James Golding	8th	161
2021	Charlie Schwerkolt Racing	Holden Commodore ZB	(Australia) Michael Caruso	16th	161
2022	Charlie Schwerkolt Racing	Holden Commodore ZB	(Australia) Michael Caruso	15th	161
2023	Charlie Schwerkolt Racing	Chevrolet Camaro Mk.6	(Australia) Michael Caruso	DNF	160
2024	Charlie Schwerkolt Racing	Chevrolet Camaro Mk.6	(Australia) Michael Caruso	18th	161
2025	Tickford Racing	Ford Mustang S650	(Australia) Cam Waters	12th	161
2026	Tickford Racing	Ford Mustang S650	(Australia) Cam Waters		

=== The Bend 500 Results ===
Year	Team	Car	Co-driver	Position	Laps
2025	Tickford Racing	Ford Mustang S650	(Australia) Cam Waters	2nd	102

=== Complete Bathurst 12 Hour results ===
Year	Team	Co-drivers	Car	Class	Laps	Overall position	Class position
2017	(Australia) BMW Team SRM	(Australia) Steven Richards (Germany) Marco Wittmann	BMW M6 GT3	AP	281	14th	7th

=== Complete Stock Car Brasil results ===
Year	Team	Car	1	2	3	4	5	6	7	8	9	10	11	12	13	14	15	16	17	18	19	20	21	Rank	Points
2014	Voxx Racing	Peugeot 408	INT; 1; 4	SCZ; 1	SCZ; 2	BRA; 1	BRA; 2	GOI; 1	GOI; 2	GOI; 1	CAS; 1	CAS; 2	CUR; 1	CUR; 2	VEL; 1	VEL; 2	SCZ; 1	SCZ; 2	TAR; 1	TAR; 2	SAL; 1	SAL; 2	CUR; 1	NC	-
2015	Voxx Racing	Peugeot 408	GOI; 1; 2	RBP; 1	RBP; 2	VEL; 1	VEL; 2	CUR; 1	CUR; 2	SCZ; 1	SCZ; 2	CUR; 1	CUR; 2	GOI; 1	CAS; 1	CAS; 2	BRA; 1	BRA; 2	CUR; 1	CUR; 2	TAR; 1	TAR; 2	INT; 1	NC	-
2018	Shell V-Power	Chevrolet Cruze	INT; 1; 11	CUR; 1	CUR; 2	VEL; 1	VEL; 2	LON; 1	LON; 2	SCZ; 1	SCZ; 2	TBA; 1	TBA; 1	TBA; 2	CAS; 1	CAS; 2	VCA; 1	VCA; 2	TAR; 1	TAR; 2	TBA; 1	TBA; 2	INT; 1	NC	-

Sporting positions
Preceded by Paul Dumbrell	Winner of the V8 Supercar Development Series; 2003	Succeeded by Andrew Jones
Preceded by Jamie Whincup; Paul Dumbrell	Winner of the Bathurst 1000; 2013 (with Steven Richards)	Succeeded by Chaz Mostert; Paul Morris
Preceded by Jamie Whincup	Winner of the International V8 Supercars Championship; 2015	Succeeded by Shane van Gisbergen
Awards and achievements
Preceded by Neil McFadyen	James Courtney Perpetual Trophy; 2001	Succeeded by Adam Graham
Preceded by Craig Lowndes	Barry Sheene Medal; 2012	Succeeded by Craig Lowndes
Preceded by Jason Bright	Jason Richards Memorial Trophy; 2014	Succeeded by Jamie Whincup
