= Greg Ritter =

Australian racing driver (born 1973)

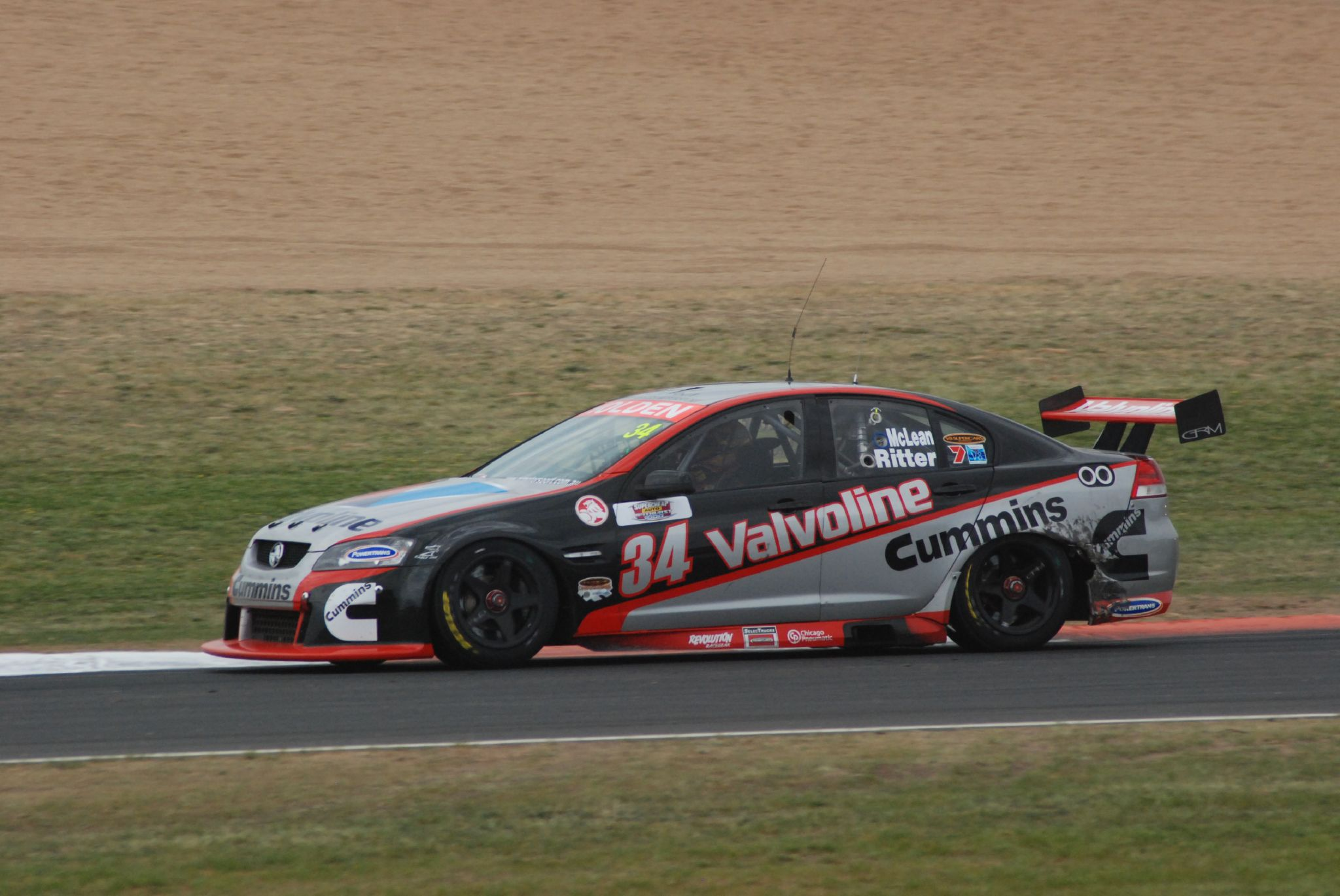
- Nationality: Australian
- Born: 20 February 1973 (age 53) Victoria, Australia

Supercars Championship career
- Championships: 0
- Races: 72
- Wins: 1
- Podiums: 1
- Pole positions: 0

Gregory James Ritter (born 20 February 1973, in Victoria) is an Australian former racing driver. He was the winner of the 1999 Australian Formula Ford Championship and shared the winning drive at the 2004 Sandown 500 with Marcos Ambrose.

Ritter begun his motor racing career in Formula Ford in 1997. After three seasons, he had become the national champion and thereafter established a partnership with Garry Rogers Motorsport to race in the V8 Supercar category. He would compete in the championship from the end of the 1990s through to the mid-2010s, establishing himself as a solid, dependable co-driver for the marquee endurance events. His final professional racing appearance came in the 2016 Touring Car Masters.

== Career summary ==
=== Junior formula ===
Ritter made his car racing debut in the Australian Formula Ford Championship in 1997. A strong campaign allowed him to finish fifth in the driver standings with two overall round podium positions at Phillip Island and Mallala. The following year, he returned to the series under the Garry Rogers Motorsport outfit. Ritter struggled for consistency this season and ultimately finished the year fourth overall. Finally, in 1999, Ritter returned to the championship with Inspired Racing. Despite not winning any rounds that season, his consistency enabled him to ward off Steve Owen to win the championship.

=== V8 Supercars ===
Whilst testing Formula Ford at Winton, Ritter was afforded an impromptu test aboard a Garry Rogers Motorsport V8 Supercar. As a result of this, Ritter offered his debut V8 Supercar drive in the Queensland 500 driving alongside Matthew Coleman. After finishing 12th in the event, the pairing would reunite for the Bathurst 1000 where they would finish ninth overall. Ritter would be retained by Garry Rogers Motorsport for 2000 to drive alongside Tim Leahey in the endurance events.

In 2001, Ritter would take part in the first two rounds of the championship with Imrie Motor Sport. He failed to qualify for the opening round at Phillip Island however made the grid for the Clipsal 500 a couple weeks later, finishing 22nd on Sunday. Ritter's primary focus that year however was in the endurance events where he would pilot the second Dick Johnson Racing Ford Falcon. At Queensland, driving alongside Paul Stokell, the duo qualified well but ultimately retired due to engine failure. At the Bathurst 1000, Ritter would be joined by Cameron McLean. The pair were leading late in the race before a series of issues threw them down to fourth at the chequered flag.

Ritter's performances throughout 2001 were enough for the team to retain him for 2002. As well as the endurance events, where he would co-drive with 1980 Formula One world champion, Alan Jones, he would make select one-off appearances in a third DJR car at Phillip Island and Eastern Creek. Although he failed to qualify at Phillip Island, he performed well at Eastern Creek, even managing to finish ahead of the teams main driver, Steven Johnson, in the final race that weekend. At the Queensland 500, Ritter and Jones finished eighth overall and ahead of the teams main car. And at the Bathurst 1000, Ritter qualified the car had initially qualified seventh overall (later overturned due to a penalty) and drew praise for his performances while Johnson and Paul Radisich struggled with their performances. Ritter and Jones ran a largely clean race, but were ultimately let down by a series of mistakes by Ritter late in the race, including almost crashing into the barriers at the final corner, to finish seventh on the road. At the next round at Surfers Paradise, Ritter was afforded a one-off drive for Briggs Motor Sport.

For 2003, Ritter signed with the fledging 00 Motorsport outfit to secure his first full-time gig in the V8 Supercar series. The venture however, was shortlived, as the team struggled for funds and after a few rounds, the team disbanded and Ritter was left to accept an endurance role with Paul Weel Racing.

In 2004, Ritter signed with Stone Brothers Racing and would co-drive with defending champion Marcos Ambrose for the endurance events. Despite spinning a turn one and narrowly missed out becoming bogged in the excessively muddy outfield, the pairing drove a strong race to hand Ritter his first and only V8 Supercar race win at the Sandown 500. At the Bathurst 1000, Ritter and Ambrose were leading the race with 15 laps to go before Ambrose was forced to pit with a delaminating tyre, thus forcing them out of contention, finishing fourth overall. He also competed in the final round of the Konica Minolta V8 Supercar Development Series at Mallala with Speed FX Racing. He dominated the round, winning two out of the three races that weekend. Ritter's performances with Stone Brothers Racing led to him signing for Ford Performance Racing as a full-time driver for 2005. Immediately, issues arose regarding the car setup and completion. The car was incomplete for the first round at Adelaide and didn't have an adjustable rear sway bar. Further issues stemming around reliability inhibited Ritter's season and for the final two rounds, he would be replaced by David Brabham.

The following season, Ritter would return to Garry Rogers Motorsport, establishing an endurance-drive partnership that would last for the duration of his V8 Supercar career. He would be joined once again by Cameron McLean. Results were lukewarm but the pair would be retained for the 2007 season. At the Bathurst 1000, the pairing went a lap down early in the race. After clawing their way back onto the lead lap, the team made a gamble for wet weather tyres in the final laps of the race when rain started to descend upon the circuit. With the majority of the field remaining on slick tyres and the track becoming increasingly treacherous, Ritter began to rapidly ascend through the order. However, the track began to dry and stunted Ritter's charge. They would ultimately finish the race in ninth place.

In the years that followed, Ritter continued driving for Garry Rogers Motorsport in the V8 Supercar endurance events with varying levels of success. In the 2009 Bathurst 1000, he and teammate David Besnard led a sizeable chunk of the race and were in contention for the overall win. But they were ultimately undone by a badly-timed safety car that threw them out of circulation. His best result at The Great Race thereafter came in 2012 when he finished fifth with Michael Caruso. He would also deputise for regular driver Alexandre Prémat at the following round on the Gold Coast. He played an integral role in the development of the Volvo S60 racecar for GRM and would be retained once again for 2014. Ritter's last race in the V8 Supercar category came in the 2014 Gold Coast 600.

=== Touring Car Masters ===
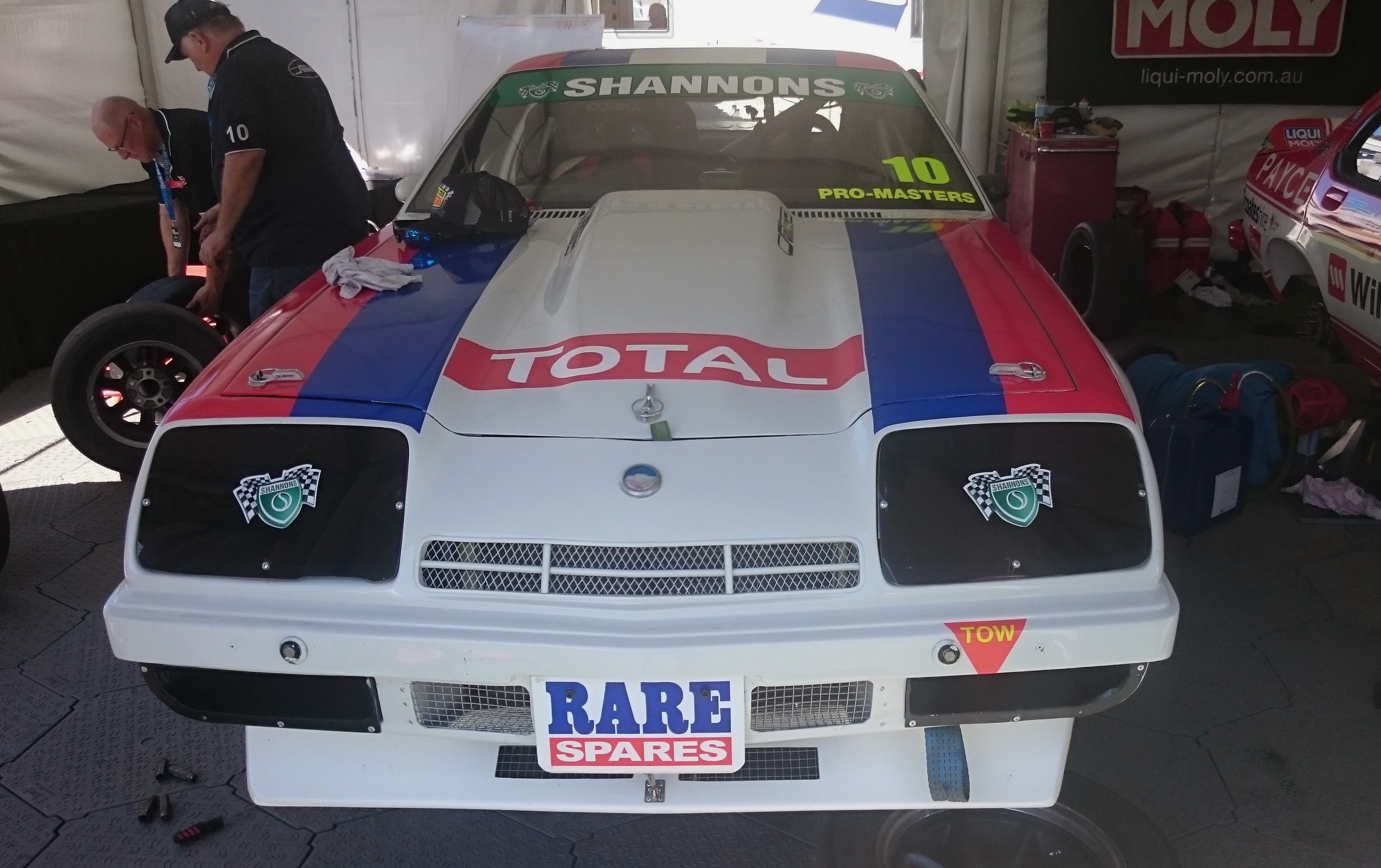
Ritter's Chevrolet Monza TCM car in 2016

After his V8 Supercar career had come to an end, Ritter returned to racing in the Touring Car Masters category in 2015 for the final round at Phillip Island. He started his debut TCM race from pole position after officials elected to void the results of a shortened qualifying session. He returned to the category for the first two rounds of the 2016 season. He won the opening two races at Adelaide and secured pole position at Sandown.

Following this round, Ritter would not return to the championship and marked his final professional motor racing appearance.

== Career results ==
=== Career summary ===
Season	Series	Team	Races	Wins	Poles	F. Laps	Podiums	Points	Position
1997	Australian Formula Ford Championship	Greg Ritter	12	0	0	0	2	97	5th
1998	Australian Formula Ford Championship	Garry Rogers Motorsport	14	0	0	0	2	109	4th
1999	Australian Formula Ford Championship	Inspired Racing	16	1	?	?	12	198	1st
1999	Shell Championship Series	Garry Rogers Motorsport	2	0	0	0	0	348	34th
2000	Shell Championship Series	Garry Rogers Motorsport	2	0	0	0	0	88	42nd
2001	Shell Championship Series	Imrie Motor Sport; Dick Johnson Racing	4	0	0	0	0	596	34th
2002	V8 Supercar Championship Series	Dick Johnson Racing; Briggs Motor Sport	7	0	0	0	0	185	36th
2003	V8 Supercar Championship Series	00 Motorsport; Paul Weel Racing	10	0	0	0	0	537	32nd
2004	V8 Supercar Championship Series	Stone Brothers Racing	2	1	0	1	1	372	32nd
2004	Konica Minolta V8 Supercar Series	Speed FX Racing	3	2	1	1	2	184	31st
2005	V8 Supercar Championship Series	Ford Performance Racing	24	0	0	0	0	739	27th
2006	V8 Supercar Championship Series	Garry Rogers Motorsport	2	0	0	0	0	200	49th
2007	V8 Supercar Championship Series	Garry Rogers Motorsport	2	0	0	0	0	27	40th
2008	V8 Supercar Championship Series	Garry Rogers Motorsport	2	0	0	0	0	245	40th
2009	V8 Supercar Championship Series	Garry Rogers Motorsport	2	0	0	0	0	306	33rd
2010	V8 Supercar Championship Series	Garry Rogers Motorsport	4	0	0	0	0	387	39th
2011	International V8 Supercars Championship	Garry Rogers Motorsport	2	0	0	0	0	243	43rd
2012	International V8 Supercars Championship	Garry Rogers Motorsport	4	0	0	0	0	371	37th
2013	International V8 Supercars Championship	Garry Rogers Motorsport	4	0	0	0	0	354	45th
2014	International V8 Supercars Championship	Garry Rogers Motorsport	4	0	0	0	0	234	46th
2015	Touring Car Masters	Sunliner RV	3	0	1	0	0	?	12th
2016	Touring Car Masters	Sunliner RV	5	2	1	0	2	234	7th

=== Complete Supercars Championship results ===
Supercars results
Year	Team	Car	1	2	3	4	5	6	7	8	9	10	11	12	13	14	15	16	17	18	19	20	21	22	23	24	25	26	27	28	29	30	31	32	33	34	35	36	37	38	39	Position	Points
1999	Garry Rogers Motorsport	Holden Commodore (VT)	EAS; R1	EAS; R2	EAS; R3	ADE; R4	BAR; R5	BAR; R6	BAR; R7	PHI; R8	PHI; R9	PHI; R10	HID; R11	HID; R12	HID; R13	SAN; R14	SAN; R15	SAN; R16	QLD; R17	QLD; R18	QLD; R19	CAL; R20	CAL; R21	CAL; R22	SYM; R23	SYM; R24	SYM; R25	WIN; R26	WIN; R27	WIN; R28	ORA; R29	ORA; R30	ORA; R31	QLD; R32; 12	BAT; R33; 9							34th	348
2000	Garry Rogers Motorsport	Holden Commodore (VT)	PHI; R1	PHI; R2	BAR; R3	BAR; R4	BAR; R5	ADE; R6	ADE; R7	EAS; R8	EAS; R9	EAS; R10	HID; R11	HID; R12	HID; R13	CAN; R14	CAN; R15	CAN; R16	QLD; R17	QLD; R18	QLD; R19	WIN; R20	WIN; R21	WIN; R22	ORA; R23	ORA; R24	ORA; R25	CAL; R26	CAL; R27	CAL; R28	QLD; R29; 9	SAN; R30	SAN; R31	SAN; R32	BAT; R33; Ret							42nd	88
2001	Imrie Motorsport	Holden Commodore (VX)	PHI; R1; DNQ	PHI; R2; DNQ	ADE; R3; 23	ADE; R4; 22	EAS; R5	EAS; R6	HDV; R7	HDV; R8	HDV; R9	CAN; R10	CAN; R11	CAN; R12	BAR; R13	BAR; R14	BAR; R15	CAL; R16	CAL; R17	CAL; R18	ORA; R19	ORA; R20	QLD; R21; Ret	WIN; R22	WIN; R23	BAT; R24	PUK; R25	PUK; R26	PUK; R27	SAN; R28	SAN; R29	SAN; R30										34th	596
2001	Dick Johnson Racing	Ford Falcon (AU)	PHI; R1	PHI; R2	ADE; R3	ADE; R4	EAS; R5	EAS; R6	HDV; R7	HDV; R8	HDV; R9	CAN; R10	CAN; R11	CAN; R12	BAR; R13	BAR; R14	BAR; R15	CAL; R16	CAL; R17	CAL; R18	ORA; R19	ORA; R20	QLD; R21; Ret	WIN; R22	WIN; R23	BAT; R24; 17	PUK; R25	PUK; R26	PUK; R27	SAN; R28	SAN; R29	SAN; R30										34th	596
2002	Dick Johnson Racing	Ford Falcon (AU)	ADE; R1	ADE; R2	PHI; R3; DNQ	PHI; R4; DNQ	EAS; R5; 19	EAS; R6; Ret	EAS; R7; 11	HDV; R8	HDV; R9	HDV; R10	CAN; R11	CAN; R12	CAN; R13	BAR; R14	BAR; R15	BAR; R16	ORA; R17	ORA; R18	WIN; R19	WIN; R20	QLD; R21; 8	BAT; R22; 7	SUR; R23	SUR; R24	PUK; R25	PUK; R26	PUK; R27	SAN; R28	SAN; R29											36th	185
2002	Briggs Motor Sport	Ford Falcon (AU)	ADE; R1	ADE; R2	PHI; R3	PHI; R4	EAS; R5	EAS; R6	EAS; R7	HDV; R8	HDV; R9	HDV; R10	CAN; R11	CAN; R12	CAN; R13	BAR; R14	BAR; R15	BAR; R16	ORA; R17	ORA; R18	WIN; R19	WIN; R20	QLD; R21	BAT; R22	SUR; R23; 29	SUR; R24; 24	PUK; R25	PUK; R26	PUK; R27	SAN; R28	SAN; R29											36th	185
2003	00 Motorsport	Ford Falcon (BA)	ADE; R1; 22	ADE; R1; 13	PHI; R3; 14	EAS; R4; 28	WIN; R5; 20	BAR; R6	BAR; R7	BAR; R8	HDV; R9; 29	HDV; R10; 26	HDV; R11; 20	QLD; R12	ORA; R13	SAN; R14	BAT; R15	SUR; R16	SUR; R17	PUK; R18	PUK; R19	PUK; R20	EAS; R21	EAS; R22																		32nd	537
2003	Paul Weel Racing	Holden Commodore (VX)	ADE; R1	ADE; R1	PHI; R3	EAS; R4	WIN; R5	BAR; R6	BAR; R7	BAR; R8	HDV; R9	HDV; R10	HDV; R11	QLD; R12	ORA; R13	SAN; R14; 22	BAT; R15; Ret	SUR; R16	SUR; R17	PUK; R18	PUK; R19	PUK; R20	EAS; R21	EAS; R22																		32nd	537
2004	Stone Brothers Racing	Ford Falcon (BA)	ADE; R1	ADE; R2	EAS; R3	PUK; R4	PUK; R5	PUK; R6	HDV; R7	HDV; R8	HDV; R9	BAR; R10	BAR; R11	BAR; R12	QLD; R13	WIN; R14	ORA; R15	ORA; R16	SAN; R17; 1	BAT; R18; 4	SUR; R19	SUR; R20	SYM; R21	SYM; R22	SYM; R23	EAS; R24	EAS; R25	EAS; R26														32nd	372
2005	Ford Performance Racing	Ford Falcon (BA)	ADE; R1; Ret	ADE; R2; Ret	PUK; R3; 19	PUK; R4; 24	PUK; R5; 21	BAR; R6; 28	BAR; R7; Ret	BAR; R8; Ret	EAS; R9; 18	EAS; R10; Ret	SHA; R11; 23	SHA; R12; 10	SHA; R13; 8	HDV; R14; 11	HDV; R15; 23	HDV; R16; 24	QLD; R17; Ret	ORA; R18; 15	ORA; R19; 29	SAN; R20; 15	BAT; R21; 18	SUR; R22; 19	SUR; R23; 20	SUR; R24; 15	SYM; R25	SYM; R26	SYM; R27	PHI; R28	PHI; R29	PHI; R30										27th	739
2006	Garry Rogers Motorsport	Holden Commodore (VZ)	ADE; R1	ADE; R2	PUK; R3	PUK; R4	PUK; R5	BAR; R6	BAR; R7	BAR; R8	WIN; R9	WIN; R10	WIN; R11	HDV; R12	HDV; R13	HDV; R14	QLD; R15	QLD; R16	QLD; R17	ORA; R18	ORA; R19	ORA; R20	SAN; R21; 20	BAT; R22; 13	SUR; R23	SUR; R24	SUR; R25	SYM; R26	SYM; R27	SYM; R28	BHR; R29	BHR; R30	BHR; R31	PHI; R32	PHI; R33	PHI; R34						49th	200
2007	Garry Rogers Motorsport	Holden Commodore (VE)	ADE; R1	ADE; R2	BAR; R3	BAR; R4	BAR; R5	PUK; R6	PUK; R7	PUK; R8	WIN; R9	WIN; R10	WIN; R11	EAS; R12	EAS; R13	EAS; R14	HDV; R15	HDV; R16	HDV; R17	QLD; R18	QLD; R19	QLD; R20	ORA; R21	ORA; R22	ORA; R23	SAN; R24; 18	BAT; R25; 9	SUR; R26	SUR; R27	SUR; R28	BHR; R29	BHR; R30	BHR; R31	SYM; R32	SYM; R33	SYM; R34	PHI; R35	PHI; R36	PHI; R37			40th	27
2008	Garry Rogers Motorsport	Holden Commodore (VE)	ADE; R1	ADE; R2	EAS; R3	EAS; R4	EAS; R5	HAM; R6	HAM; R7	HAM; R8	BAR; R9	BAR; R10	BAR; R11	SAN; R12	SAN; R13	SAN; R14	HDV; R15	HDV; R16	HDV; R17	QLD; R18	QLD; R19	QLD; R20	WIN; R21	WIN; R22	WIN; R23	PHI; R24; 12	BAT; R25; 16	SUR; R26	SUR; R27	SUR; R28	BHR; R29	BHR; R30	BHR; R31	SYM; R32	SYM; R33	SYM; R34	ORA; R35	ORA; R36	ORA; R37			40th	245
2009	Garry Rogers Motorsport	Holden Commodore (VE)	ADE; R1	ADE; R2	HAM; R3	HAM; R4	WIN; R5	WIN; R6	SYM; R7	SYM; R8	HDV; R9	HDV; R10	TOW; R11	TOW; R12	SAN; R13	SAN; R14	QLD; R15	QLD; R16	PHI; Q 22	PHI; R17; 13	BAT; R18; 9	SUR; R19	SUR; R20	SUR; R21	SUR; R22	PHI; R23	PHI; R24	BAR; R25	BAR; R26	SYD; R27	SYD; R28											33rd	306
2010	Garry Rogers Motorsport	Holden Commodore (VE)	YMC; R1	YMC; R2	BHR; R3	BHR; R4	ADE; R5	ADE; R6	HAM; R7	HAM; R8	QLD; R9	QLD; R10	WIN; R11	WIN; R12	HDV; R13	HDV; R14	TOW; R15	TOW; R16	PHI; R17; 11	BAT; R18; 10	SUR; R19; 19	SUR; R20; 9	SYM; R21	SYM; R22	SAN; R23	SAN; R24	SYD; R25	SYD; R26														39th	387
2011	Garry Rogers Motorsport	Holden Commodore (VE)	YMC; R1	YMC; R2	ADE; R3	ADE; R4	HAM; R5	HAM; R6	BAR; R7	BAR; R8	BAR; R9	WIN; R10	WIN; R11	HID; R12	HID; R13	TOW; R14	TOW; R15	QLD; R16	QLD; R17	QLD; R18	PHI; R19; 12	BAT; R20; 17	SUR; R21	SUR; R22	SYM; R23	SYM; R24	SAN; R25	SAN; R26	SYD; R27	SYD; R28												43rd	243
2012	Garry Rogers Motorsport	Holden Commodore (VE)	ADE; R1	ADE; R2	SYM; R3	SYM; R4	HAM; R5	HAM; R6	BAR; R7	BAR; R8	BAR; R9	PHI; R10	PHI; R11	HID; R12	HID; R13	TOW; R14	TOW; R15	QLD; R16	QLD; R17	SMP; R18	SMP; R19	SAN; QR; 9	SAN; R20; 14	BAT; R21; 5	SUR; R22; Ret	SUR; R23; DNS	YMC; R24	YMC; R25	YMC; R26	WIN; R27	WIN; R28	SYD; R29	SYD; R30									37th	371
2013	Garry Rogers Motorsport	Holden Commodore (VF)	ADE; R1	ADE; R2	SYM; R3	SYM; R4	SYM; R5	PUK; R6	PUK; R7	PUK; R8	PUK; R9	BAR; R10	BAR; R11	BAR; R12	COA; R13	COA; R14	COA; R15	COA; R16	HID; R17	HID; R18	HID; R19	TOW; R20	TOW; R21	QLD; R22	QLD; R23	QLD; R24	WIN; R25	WIN; R26	WIN; R27	SAN; R28; 10	BAT; R29; 23	SUR; R30; 14	SUR; R31; 14	PHI; R32	PHI; R33	PHI; R34	SYD; R35	SYD; R36				45th	354
2014	Garry Rogers Motorsport	Volvo S60	ADE; R1	ADE; R2	ADE; R3	SYM; R4	SYM; R5	SYM; R6	WIN; R7	WIN; R8	WIN; R9	PUK; R10	PUK; R11	PUK; R12	PUK; R13	BAR; R14	BAR; R15	BAR; R16	HID; R17	HID; R18	HID; R19	TOW; R20	TOW; R21	TOW; R22	QLD; R23	QLD; R24	QLD; R25	SMP; R26	SMP; R27	SMP; R28	SAN; Q 20	SAN; R29; 17	BAT; R30; Ret	SUR; R31; 12	SUR; R32; 16	PHI; R33	PHI; R34	PHI; R35	SYD; R36	SYD; R37	SYD; R38	46th	234

=== Complete Bathurst 1000 results ===
Year	Team	Car	Co-driver	Position	Laps
1999	Garry Rogers Motorsport	Holden VT Commodore	(Australia) Steve Owen	9th	160
2000	Garry Rogers Motorsport	Holden VT Commodore	(Australia) Tim Leahey	DNF	40
2001	Dick Johnson Racing	Ford AU Falcon	(Australia) Cameron McLean	4th	161
2002	Dick Johnson Racing	Ford AU Falcon	(Australia) Alan Jones	7th	161
2003	Paul Weel Racing	Holden VX Commodore	(Australia) Marcus Marshall	DNF	159
2004	Stone Brothers Racing	Ford BA Falcon	(Australia) Marcos Ambrose	4th	161
2005	Ford Performance Racing	Ford BA Falcon	(Australia) Cameron McLean	18th	138
2006	Garry Rogers Motorsport	Holden VZ Commodore	(Australia) Cameron McLean	13th	160
2007	Garry Rogers Motorsport	Holden VE Commodore	(Australia) Cameron McLean	9th	161
2008	Garry Rogers Motorsport	Holden VE Commodore	(Australia) Steven Ellery	16th	157
2009	Garry Rogers Motorsport	Holden VE Commodore	(Australia) David Besnard	9th	161
2010	Garry Rogers Motorsport	Holden VE Commodore	(Australia) Michael Caruso	10th	161
2011	Garry Rogers Motorsport	Holden VE Commodore	(Australia) Lee Holdsworth	17th	161
2012	Garry Rogers Motorsport	Holden VE Commodore	(Australia) Michael Caruso	5th	161
2013	Garry Rogers Motorsport	Holden VF Commodore	(France) Alexandre Prémat	23rd	154
2014	Garry Rogers Motorsport	Volvo S60	(Sweden) Robert Dahlgren	DNF	114
