= 1999 Australian Formula Ford Championship =

Motor racing competition

The 1999 Australian Formula Ford Championship was an Australian motor racing competition for Formula Ford cars. It was authorised by the Confederation of Australian Motor Sport as an Australian National Title. It was the 30th national series for Formula Fords to be held in Australia and seventh to be contested under the Australian Formula Ford Championship name.

The championship was won by Greg Ritter driving a Mygale SJ98 Ford.

== Calendar ==
The championship was contested over an eight-round series with two races per round.

Round	Circuit	Dates	Round winner	Map
1	(New South Wales) Eastern Creek Raceway	28 March	(Australia) Stewart McColl	1999 Australian Formula Ford Championship is located in Australia
2	(Western Australia) Wanneroo Raceway	2 May	(Australia) Stuart Kostera	1999 Australian Formula Ford Championship is located in Australia
3	(Victoria (state)) Phillip Island Grand Prix Circuit	16 May	(Australia) Alex Davison	1999 Australian Formula Ford Championship is located in Australia
4	(Victoria (state)) Sandown Raceway	27 June	(Australia) Justin Cotter	1999 Australian Formula Ford Championship is located in Australia
5	Queensland Raceway	11 July	(Australia) Steve Owen	1999 Australian Formula Ford Championship is located in Australia
6	(Victoria (state)) Calder Park Raceway	25 July	(Australia) Steve Owen	1999 Australian Formula Ford Championship is located in Australia
7	(New South Wales) Winton Motor Raceway	22 August	(Australia) Steve Owen	1999 Australian Formula Ford Championship is located in Australia
8	(New South Wales) Oran Park Raceway	5 September	(Australia) Alex Davison	1999 Australian Formula Ford Championship is located in Australia

== Results ==
Championship points were awarded at each race on the following basis:

Position	1st	2nd	3rd	4th	5th	6th	7th	8th	9th	10th
Points	20	16	14	12	10	8	6	4	2	1

Pos	Driver	No.	Car	Entrant	(New South Wales) EAS	(Western Australia) WAN	(Victoria (state)) PHI	(Victoria (state)) SAN	(Queensland) QUE	(Victoria (state)) CAL	(Victoria (state)) WIN	(New South Wales) ORA	Pts
1	(Australia) Greg Ritter	4	Mygale SJ98	Inspired Racing	22	32	30	34	30	2	30	18	198
2	(Australia) Steve Owen	9	Spectrum 07 Ford	Garry Rogers Motorsport	20	4	4	28	36	40	40	24	196
3	(Australia) Alex Davison	7	Van Diemen RF98	Sonic Motor Racing Services	18	6	40	10	22	30	30	40	196
4	(Australia) Stuart Kostera	22	Van Diemen RF94	Fastlane Racing	1	40	10	20	-	22	16	26	135
5	(Singapore) Christian Murchison	5	Van Diemen RF98	Fastlane Racing	3	12	24	20	20	30	6	8	123
6	(Australia) Justin Cotter	70	Spectrum 06B	Factory Enterprises	-	1	30	36	6	12	-	-	85
7	(Australia) Leanne Ferrier	42	Van Diemen RF94	Fastlane Racing	-	12	6	2	22	-	9	32	83
8	(Australia) Tyler Mecklem	16	Van Diemen RF91	TDK Australia	15	24	16	4	4	-	1	12	76
9	(Australia) Ashley Seward	10	Spectrum 06b	Ashley Seward Motorsport	4	18	-	18	10	4	8	1	63
10	(Australia) Owen Kelly	14	Spectrum 07	Owen Kelly	-	-	9	1	22	14	2	14	62
11	(Australia) Stewart McColl	38	Spectrum 06b	Stewart McColl	30	2	-	4	-	-	12	-	48
12	(New Zealand) LeRoy Stevenson	8	Spectrum 07; Van Diemen RF91	L Stevenson & Fastlane Racing	1	26	8	2	2	-	-	-	39
13	(Australia) Simon Wheeler	86	Van Diemen RF98	Fastlane Racing	-	6	-	-	-	10	16	1	33
14	(Australia) Kerry Wade	15	Van Diemen RF94	Kerry Wade	-	-	-	6	-	18	4	2	30
15	(Australia) Ty Hanger	18	Spectrum 06b	Hanger Racing	15	-	-	-	2	-	-	5	22
16	(Australia) Tom Ceveri	67	Van Diemen RF95	Mike Ceveri	-	-	8	-	2	2	-	-	12
17	(Australia) Andrew Jones	81	Van Diemen RF96	Brad Jones Racing	-	-	-	-	-	-	10	-	10
18	(Australia) Drew Kruck	36	Van Diemen RF94	D Kruck	8	-	-	-	-	-	-	-	8
18	(Australia) Will Power	74	Swift SC92F	Robert Power	-	-	-	-	8	-	-	-	8
20	(Australia) Jim McKinnon	25	Spectrum 07	George Stockman	2.5	-	-	-	-	1	-	-	3.5
21	(Australia) Scott March	27	Spectrum 07	George Stockman	-	-	-	-	-	-	2	-	2
21	(Australia) Christian Jory	17	Spectrum 06b	Trading Post	-	2	-	-	-	-	-	-	2
21	(Australia) Robert Jones	20	Van Diemen RF94	Car-Tek Racing Pty Ltd	-	1	1	-	-	-	-	-	2
24	(Australia) Sam Oliver	80	Van Diemen RF94	Sam Oliver	-	-	-	1	-	-	-	-	1
24	(New Zealand) Phil Hellebrekers	71	Spectrum 07	Phil Hellebrekers	-	-	-	-	-	1	-	-	1
Pos	Driver	No.	Car	Entrant	(New South Wales) EAS	(Western Australia) WAN	(Victoria (state)) PHI	(Victoria (state)) SAN	(Queensland) QUE	(Victoria (state)) CAL	(Victoria (state)) WIN	(New South Wales) ORA	Pts

Note:

- All cars were required to use a designated Ford 1600cc crossflow engine.
- Race 1 of Round 1 at Eastern Creek was stopped prematurely due to an incident and only half points were awarded for that race.
