= 2015 Touring Car Masters =

Australian motor racing series

Seasons
- ← 2014 2016 →

The 2015 Touring Car Masters was an Australian motor racing series for Touring Cars manufactured between 1963 and 1976. It was sanctioned by the Confederation of Australian Motor Sport (CAMS) as a National Series with Touring Car Masters Pty Ltd appointed by CAMS as the Category Manager. The series was the ninth annual Touring Car Masters.

The Pro Masters class was won by John Bowe (Ford Mustang and Holden Torana SL/R 5000), Pro Am by Cameron Tilley (Chrysler Valiant Pacer), Pro Sport by Leo Tobin (Holden HQ Monaro), Invitational by Paul Freestone (Chevrolet Camaro SS) and Trans Am by Charlie O'Brien (Pontiac Firebird).

== Calendar ==
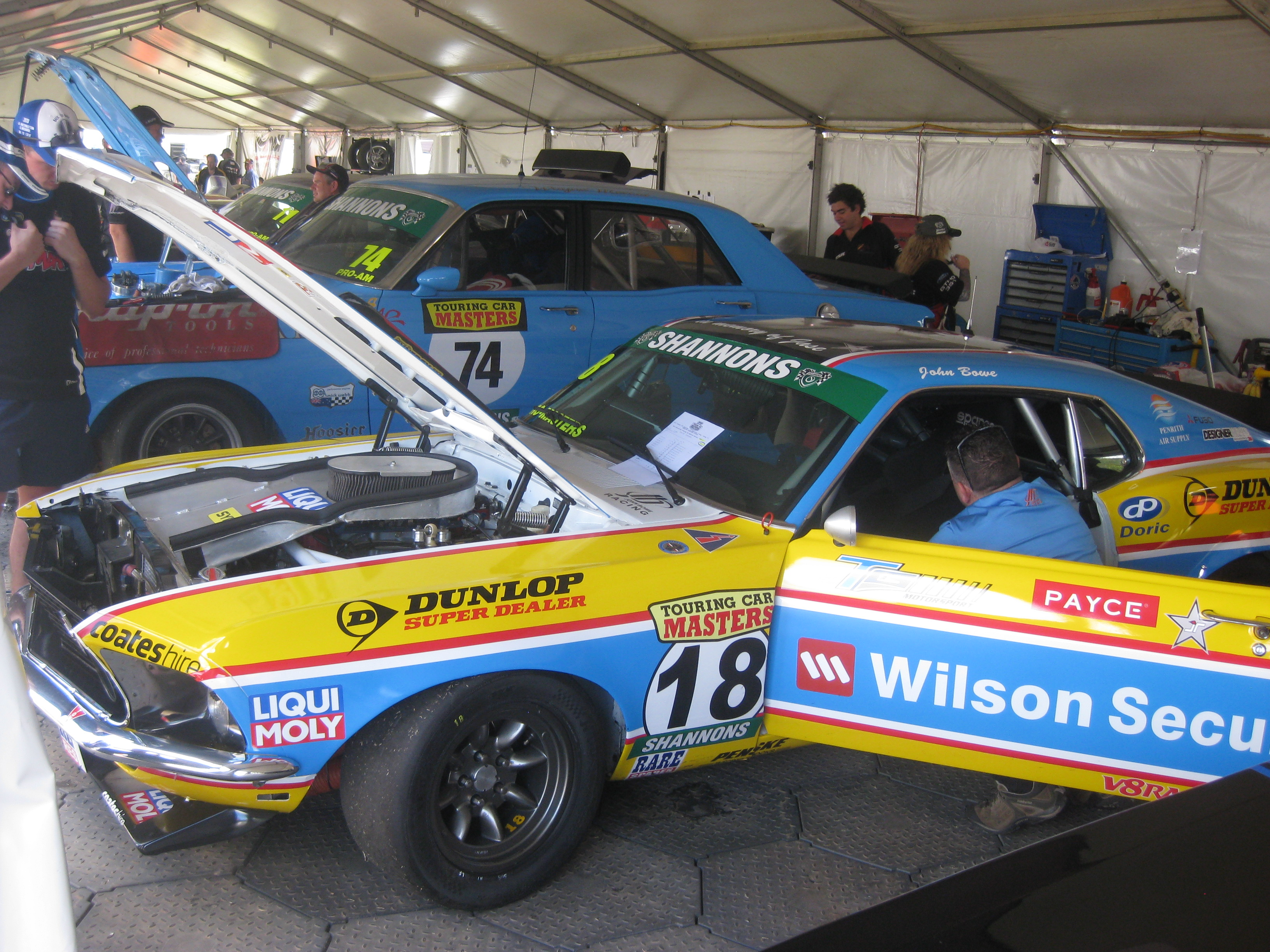
John Bowe won the Pro Masters class driving a Ford Mustang (pictured) and a Holden Torana

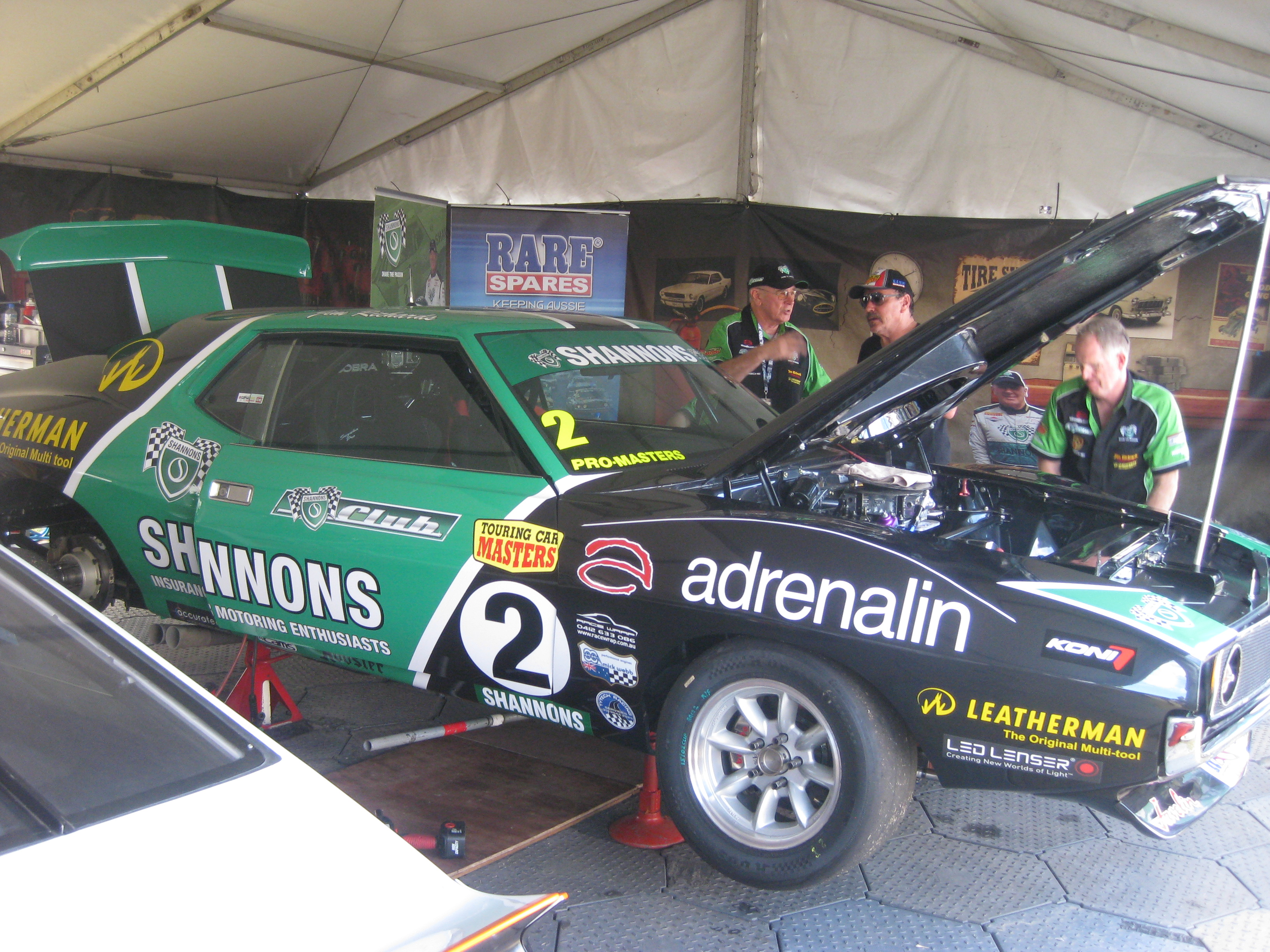
Jim Richards placed second in the Pro Masters class driving an AMC Javelin

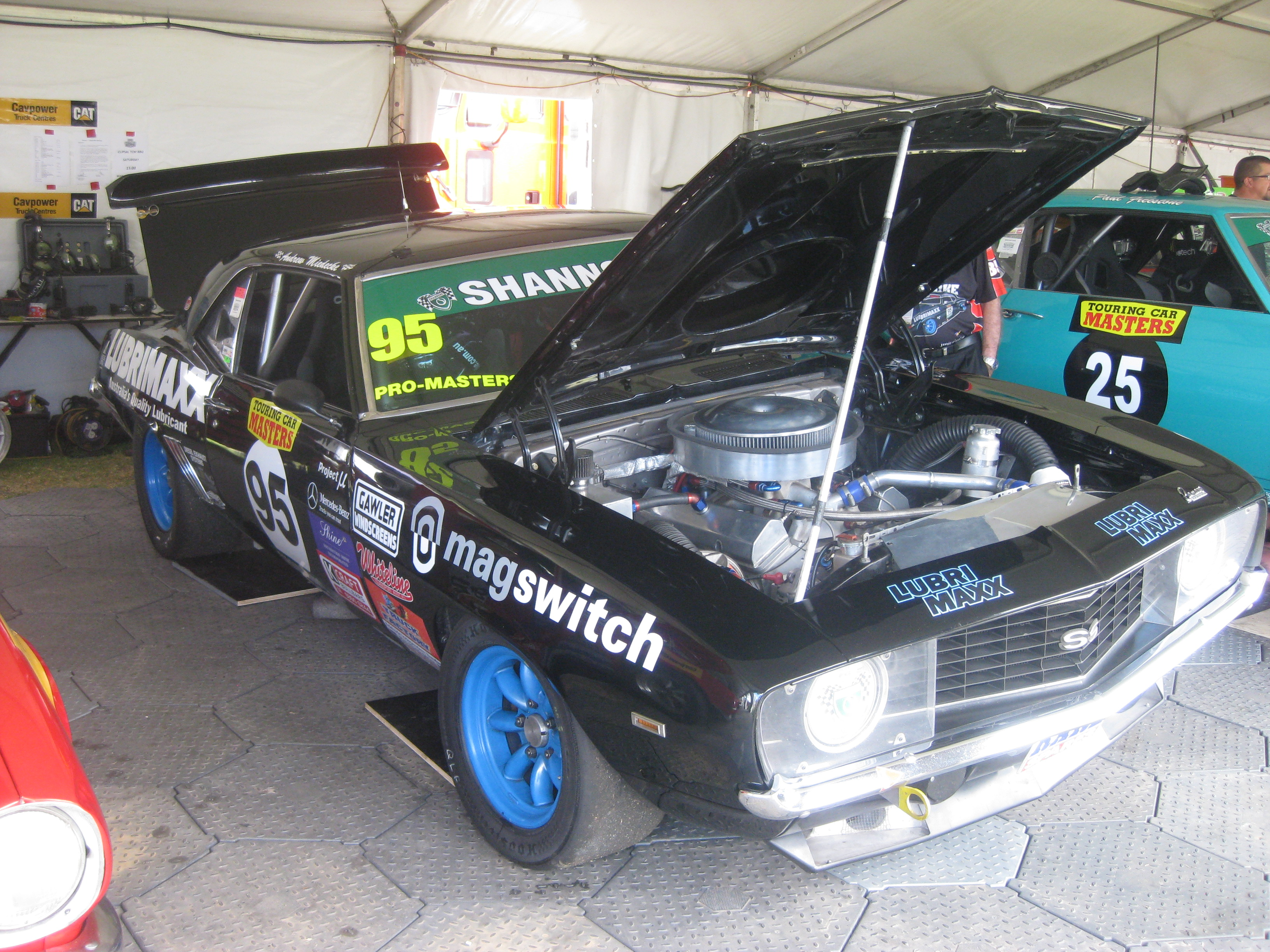
Andrew Miedecke placed fifth in the Pro Masters class driving a Chevrolet Camaro SS

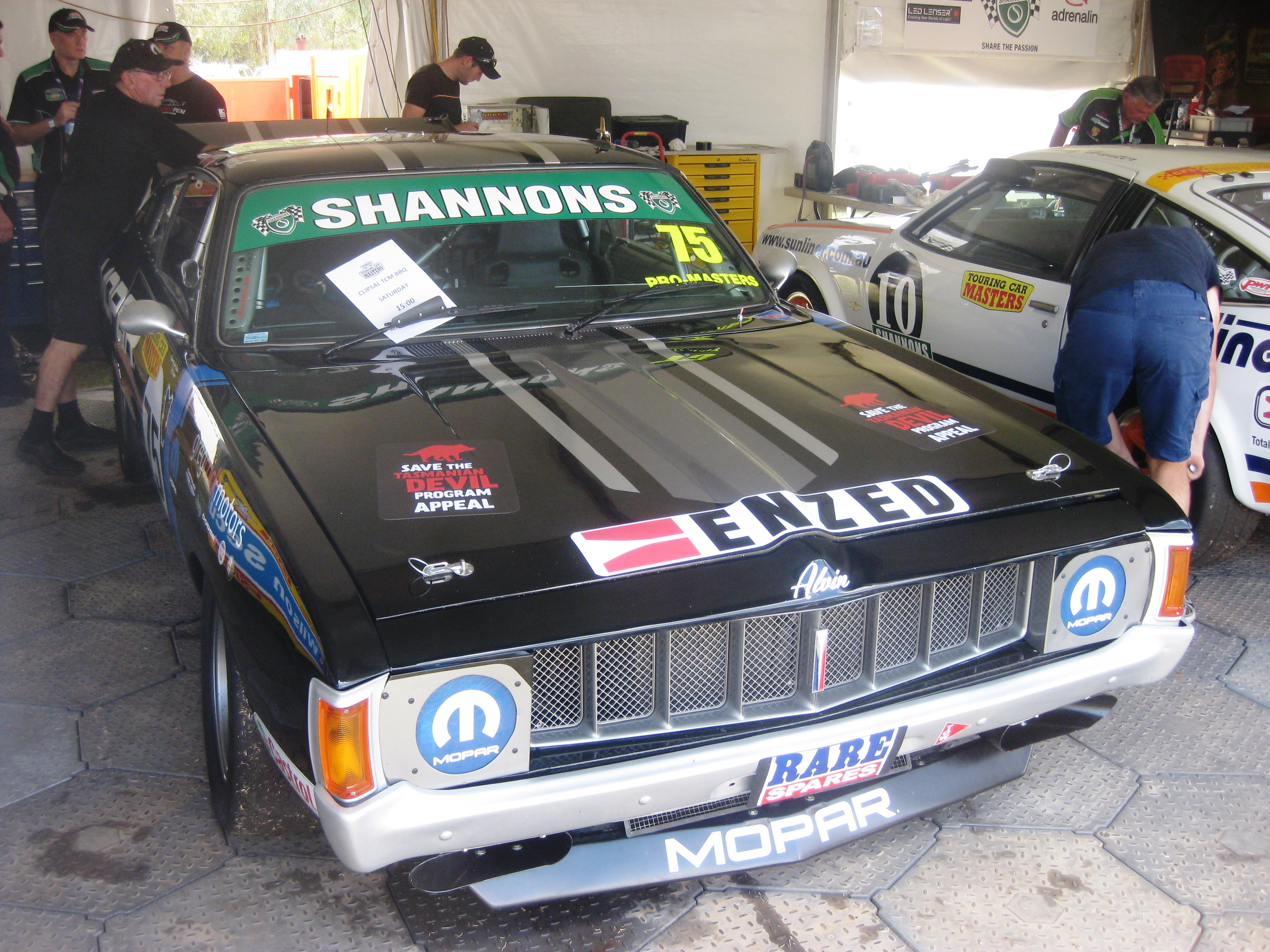
Greg Crick placed eighth in the Pro Masters class driving a Chrysler Valiant Charger E55

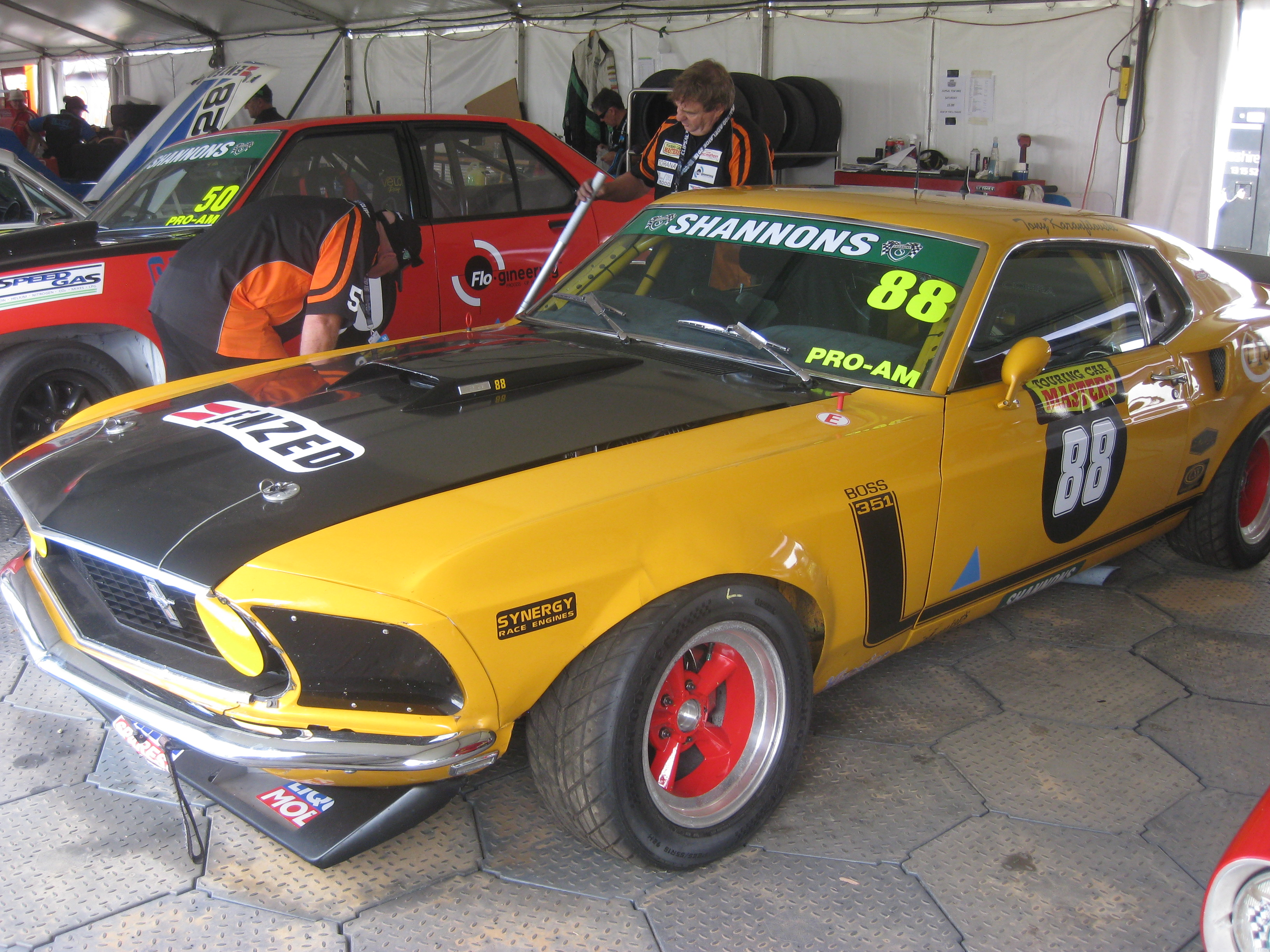
Tony Karanfilovski placed second in the Pro Am class driving a Ford Mustang

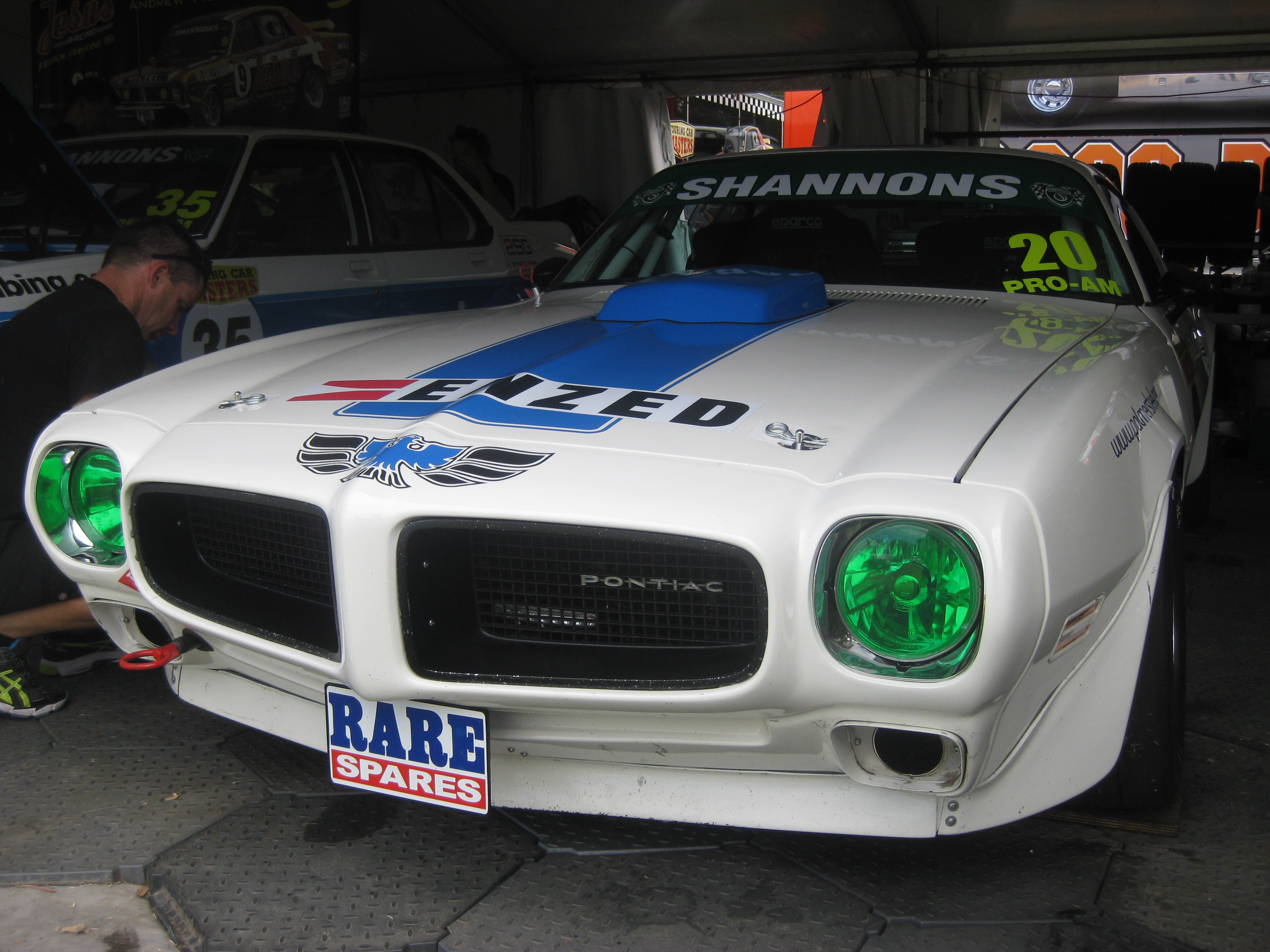
Ian Palmer placed fifth in the Pro Am class driving a Pontiac Firebird Trans Am

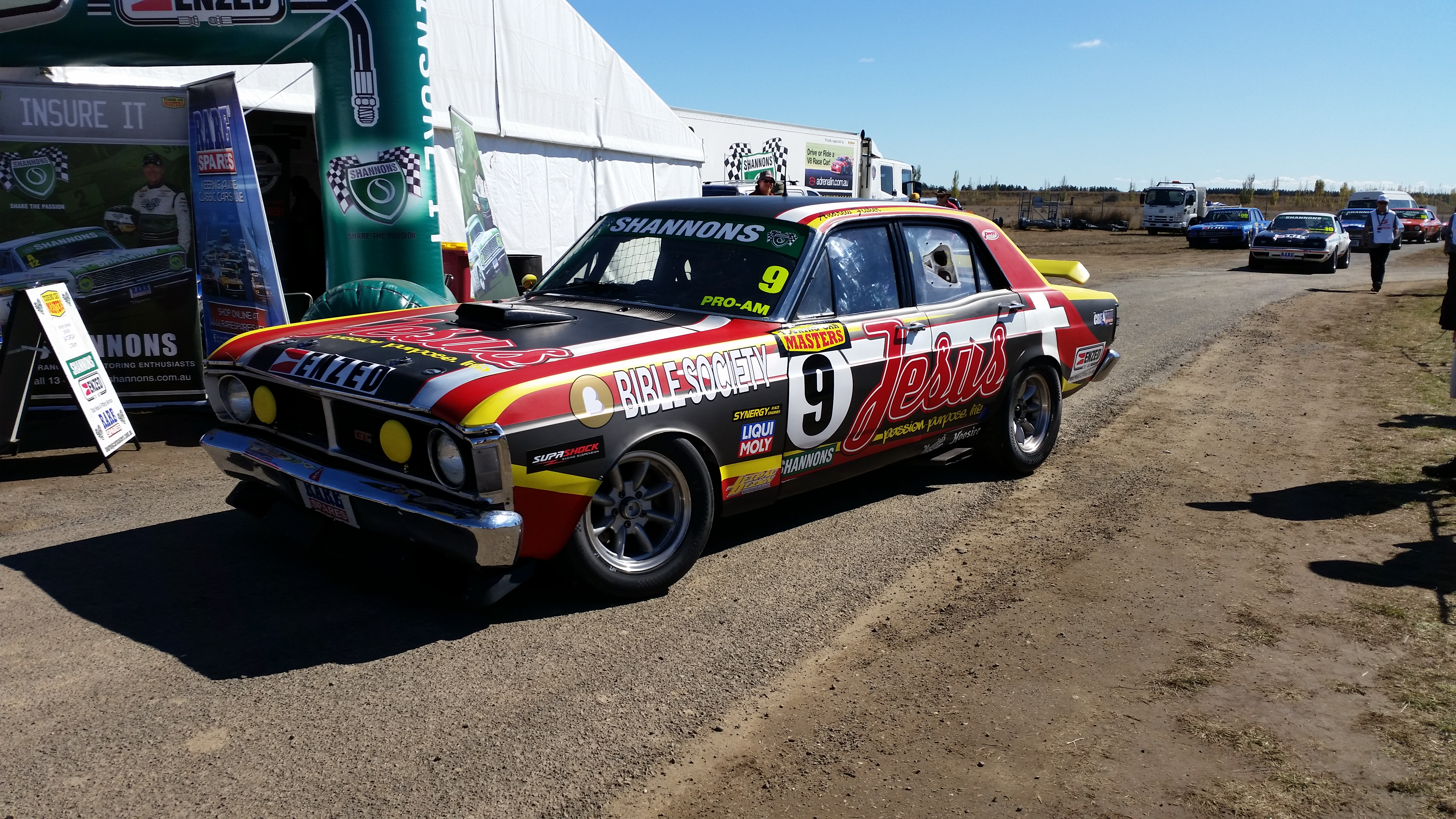
Andrew Fisher placed sixth in the Pro Am class driving a Ford XY Falcon GTHO

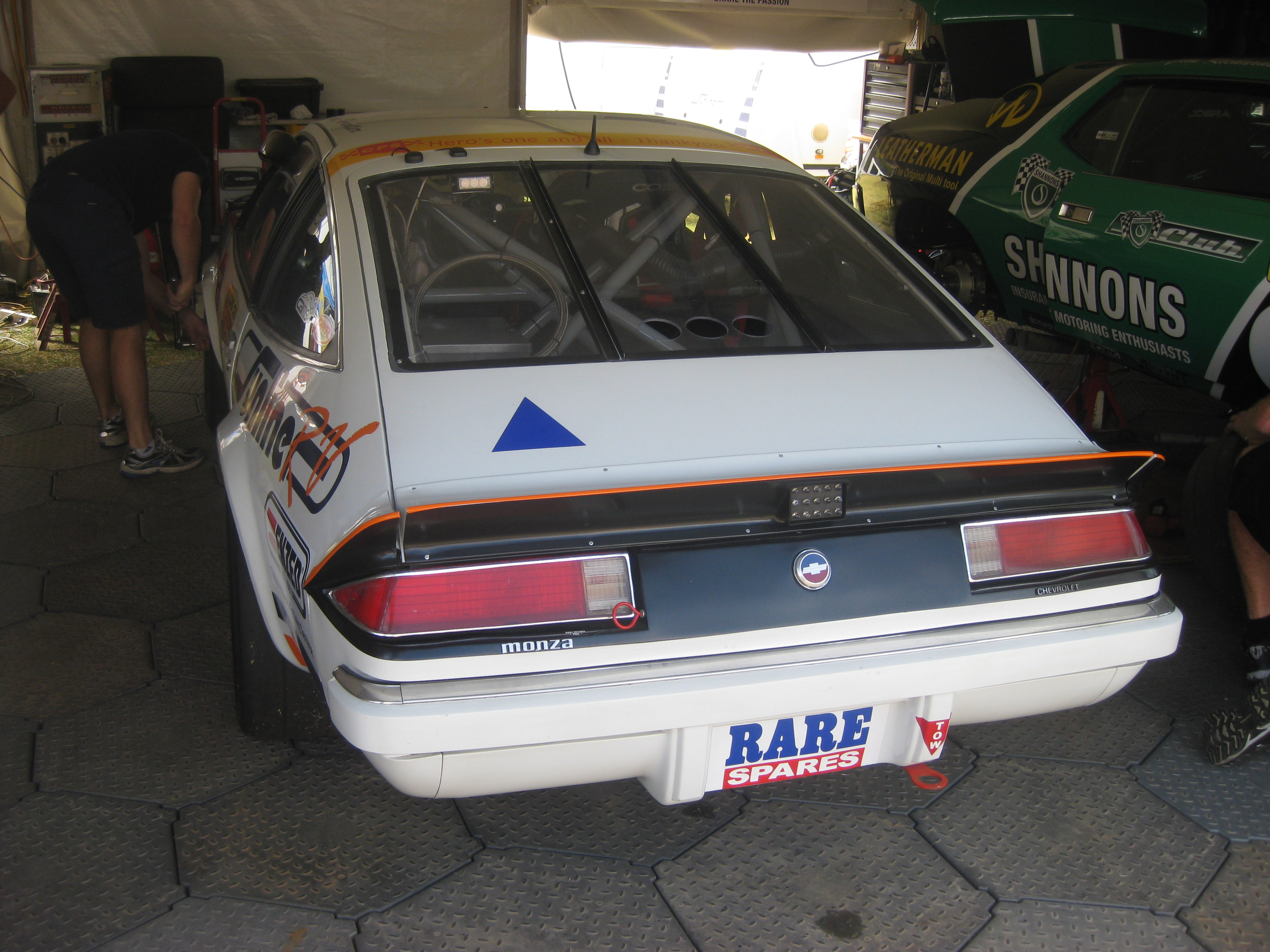
Tony Hunter placed fourth in the Pro Sport class driving a Chevrolet Monza 2+2

The series was contested over eight rounds.

Round	Circuit	Date	Round format
1	Adelaide Parklands	6 February – 1 March	Three races
2	Symmons Plains	27 – 29 March	Three races
3	Winton Raceway	15 – 17 May	Three races
4	Hidden Valley	9–21 June	Three races
5	Queensland Raceway	31 July – 2 August	Three races
6	Sydney Motorsport Park	5–6 September	Three races
7	Mount Panorama	8–11 October	Three races
8	Phillip Island	20–22 November	Three races

== Classes ==
Each automobile was allocated into one of the following classes:

- Pro Masters – for professional drivers
- Pro Am – for part-timers or drivers competing for fun
- Pro Sport – for those wishing to cross-enter in the same car
- Invitational
- Trans Am

== Points system ==
Series points were awarded on the following basis within each class at each race.

Position	1st	2nd	3rd	4th	5th	6th	7th	8th	9th	10th	11th	12th	13th	14th	15th	16th	17th	18th	19th	20th	21st	22nd	23rd	24th	25th	26th	27th	28th	29th	30th
Points	60	56	52	48	45	42	39	36	33	30	27	24	21	18	17	16	15	14	13	12	11	10	9	8	7	6	5	4	3	2

== Series standings ==
Pro Master											
Position	Driver	Car	Ade	Sym	Win	Hid	Que	Syd	Mou	Phi	Total
1	John Bowe	Ford Mustang; Holden Torana SL/R 5000	90	0	180	168	156	180	176	146	1096
2	Jim Richards	AMC Javelin	133	136	126	148	132	136	144	111	1066
3	Mark King	Chevrolet Camaro RS	122	90	135	114	114	149	135	102	961
4	Eddie Abelnica	Ford XB Falcon Hardtop	148	140	0	69	132	157	156	130	932
5	Andrew Miedecke	Chevrolet Camaro SS	168	81	152	156	164	80	39	65.5	905.5
6	Steven Johnson	Ford Mustang	0	180	0	176	180	0	172	144	852
7	Glenn Seton	Ford Mustang	81	126	156	0	100	145	84	0	692
8	Greg Crick	Chrysler Valiant Charger E55	129	154	120	129	36	0	0	0	568
9	Gavin Bullas	Ford Boss Mustang	157	101	157	45	0	0	0	0	460
10	Keith Kassulke	Ford XB Falcon Hardtop	136	84	0	126	42	0	0	0	388
11	Neil Crompton	Ford Mustang	0	0	0	0	0	139	0	0	139
12	Greg Ritter	Chevrolet Monza 2+2	0	0	0	0	0	0	0	48	48
Pro Am											
Position	Driver	Car	Ade	Sym	Win	Hid	Que	Syd	Mou	Phi	Total
1	Cameron Tilley	Chrysler Valiant Pacer	172	164	162	164	56	156	126	127	1126.5
2	Tony Karanfilovski	Ford Mustang	0	104	138	148	172	168	100	150	980
3	Jason Gomersall	Holden Torana SL/R	52	146	0	172	172	180	97	138	957
4	Brett Youlden	Holden HQ Monaro	164	120	172	0	0	48	180	24	708
5	Ian Palmer	Pontiac Firebird Trans Am	132	129	111	0	148	135	0	0	655
6	Andrew Fisher	Ford XY Falcon GTHO	78	136	160	164	0	0	56	28	622
7	Cameron Mason	Ford Mustang; Chevrolet Camaro	152	0	100	39	138	0	156	0	585
8	Rusty French	Ford Mustang	0	0	123	0	97	138	146	0	504
9	Tony Hunter	Chevrolet Monza 2+2	0	0	84	132	0	0	87	0	303
10	Bill Pye	Chevrolet Camaro	0	149	0	45	0	0	0	0	194
11	Brad Tilley	Ford Mustang	150	0	0	0	0	0	0	0	150
12	Carey McMahon	Holden Torana SL/R	81	0	0	0	0	0	0	0	81
13	Steve Mason	Chevrolet Camaro	0	0	0	42	0	0	0	0	42
Pro Sport											
Position	Driver	Car	Ade	Sym	Win	Hid	Que	Syd	Mou	Phi	Total
1	Leo Tobin	Holden HQ Monaro	160	164	164	112	180	148	148	136	1212
2	Wayne Mercer	Ford XY Falcon GTHO	146	96	0	180	0	172	160	74	828
3	Tony Edwards	Ford XA Falcon GT	42	168	172	0	0	120	176	150	828
4	Tony Hunter	Chevrolet Monza 2+2	180	172	0	0	0	0	0	0	352
5	Garry Treloar	Holden HQ Monaro	0	0	149	56	0	0	0	0	205
6	Adam Garwood	Holden Torana	0	0	0	0	0	0	164	28	192
7	Bruce McLeod	Ford XA Falcon GT	0	93	96	0	0	0	0	0	189
8	Chris Stillwell	Ford Mustang	0	0	0	0	0	160	0	0	160
9	Greg Keene	Porsche 911S	145	0	0	0	0	0	0	0	145
10	Amanda Sparks	Porsche 911S	132	0	0	0	0	0	0	0	132
11	Graham Stewart	Chevrolet Camaro SS	120	0	0	0	0	0	0	0	120
12	Nigel Benson	Holden HQ Monaro	104	0	0	0	0	0	0	0	104
13	Graham Alexamder	Holden HT Monaro	0	0	0	0	0	0	0	74.5	74.5
Invitational											
Position	Driver	Car	Ade	Sym	Win	Hid	Que	Syd	Mou	Phi	Total
1	Paul Freestone	Chevrolet Camaro SS	120	180	180	0	0	180	172	0	832
2	Rohan Little	Porsche 911	116	0	0	0	0	0	108	140	364
3	Sven Burchartz	Porsche 911 RS	0	0	0	0	0	0	172	150	322
4	Leon Bell	Holden HQ Monaro	0	168	0	0	0	0	0	0	168
5	Rory O'Neill	Porsche 911	112	0	0	0	0	0	0	0	112
6	Graeme Cook	Porsche 911	52	0	0	0	0	0	0	0	52
7	John Talbot	Ford Mustang	0	52	0	0	0	0	0	0	52
8	David Falvey	Holden Torana SS	0	0	0	0	0	0	0	0	0
Trans Am											
Position	Driver	Car	Ade	Sym	Win	Hid	Que	Syd	Mou	Phi	Total
1	Charlie O'Brien	Pontiac Firebird	0	0	0	0	180	0	0	0	180
