= 2016 Touring Car Masters =

Australian annual motorsport competition

The 2016 Touring Car Masters was an Australian motor racing series for modified touring cars manufactured between 1 January 1963 and 31 December 1978. It was the tenth running of the Touring Car Masters. The series was sanctioned by the Confederation of Australian Motor Sport (CAMS) as an Authorised Series with Touring Car Masters Pty. Ltd. appointed as the Category Manager by CAMS.

The Pro Master class was won by John Bowe (Holden Torana), Pro Am by Jason Gomersall (Holden Torana), Pro Sport by Adam Garwood (Holden Torana) and the Invitational class by Greg Garwood (Ford Capri Perana).

The Touring Cars Masters field was combined with New Zealand Central Muscle Car series competitors for the Bathurst round. The Trans-Tasman Challenge featured over 50 cars from both series with Glenn Seton winning the round in his Ford Mustang. Dean Perkins was the best placed New Zealander with his Ford Falcon.

== Teams and drivers ==
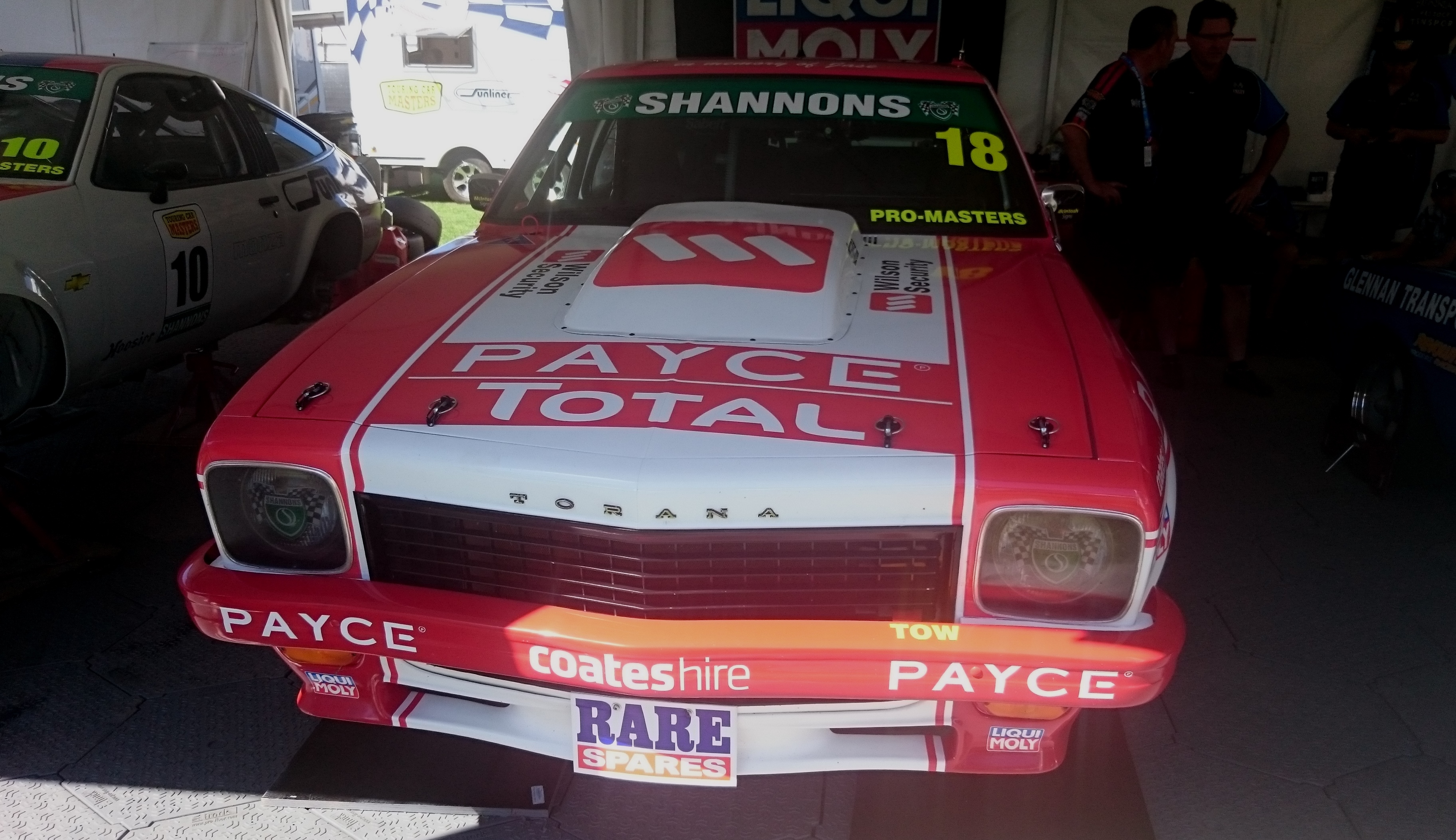
John Bowe (Holden Torana SL/R 5000) won the Pro Master class

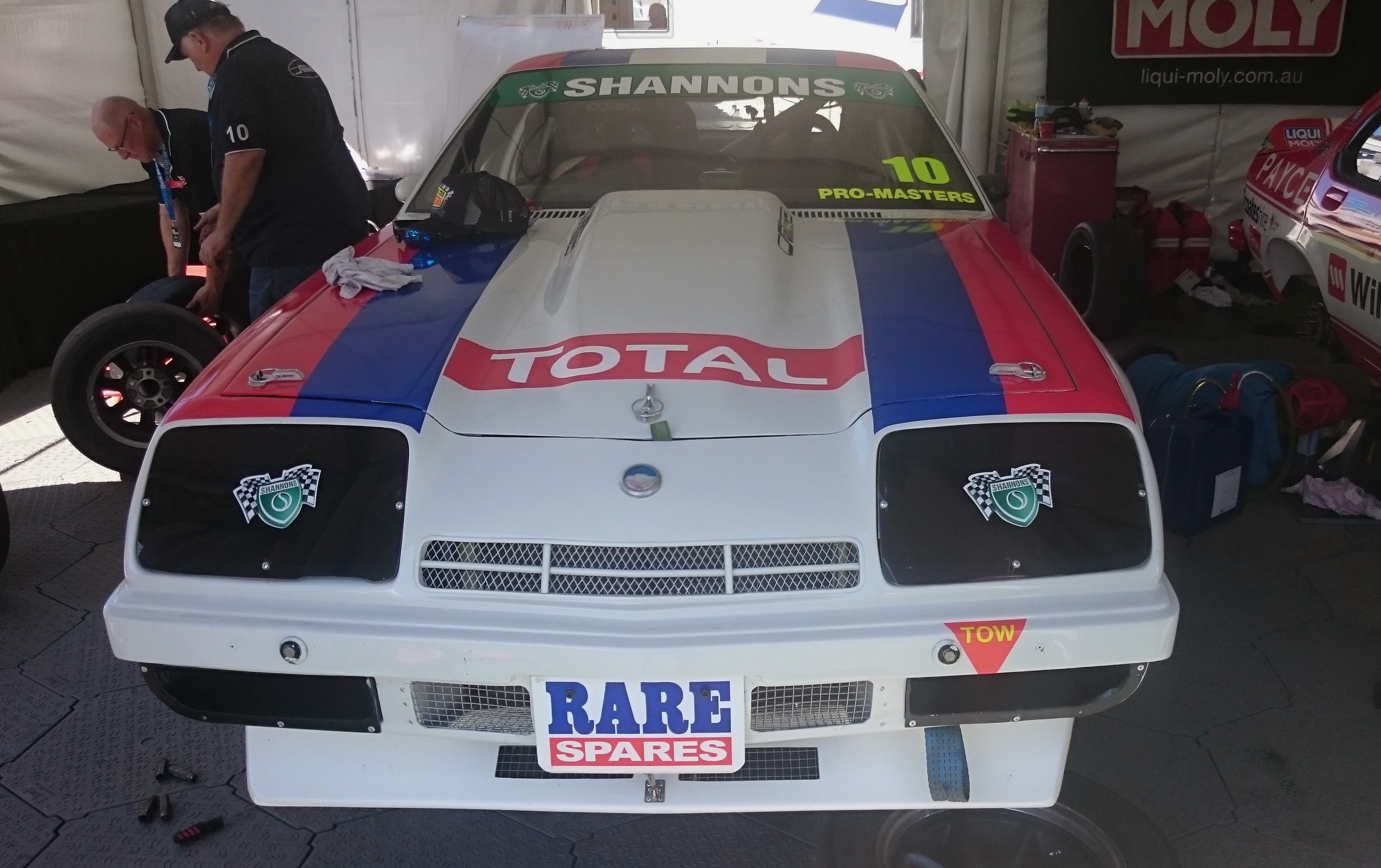
Greg Ritter (Chevrolet Monza) placed seventh in Pro Master

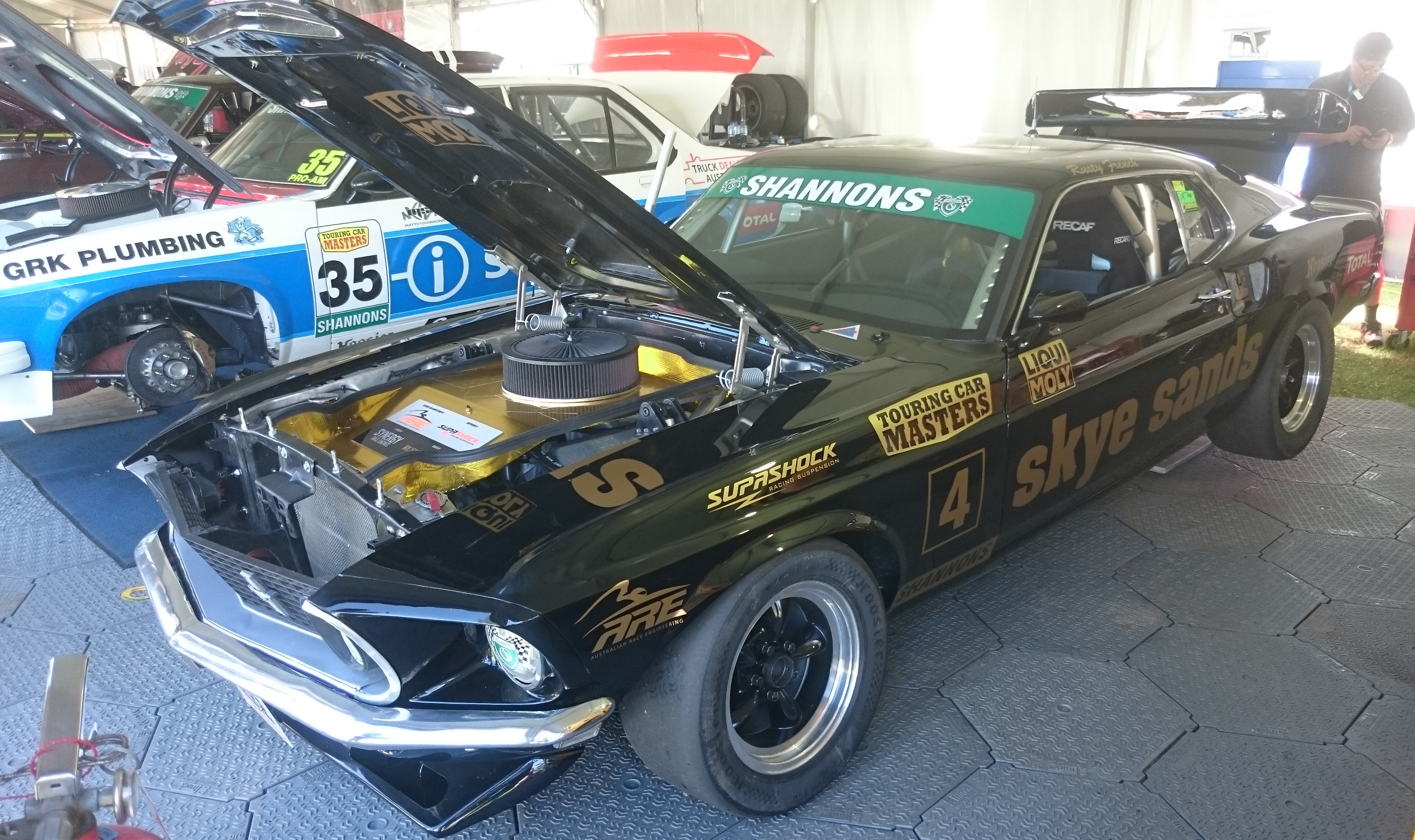
Rusty French (Ford Mustang) placed third in Pro Am

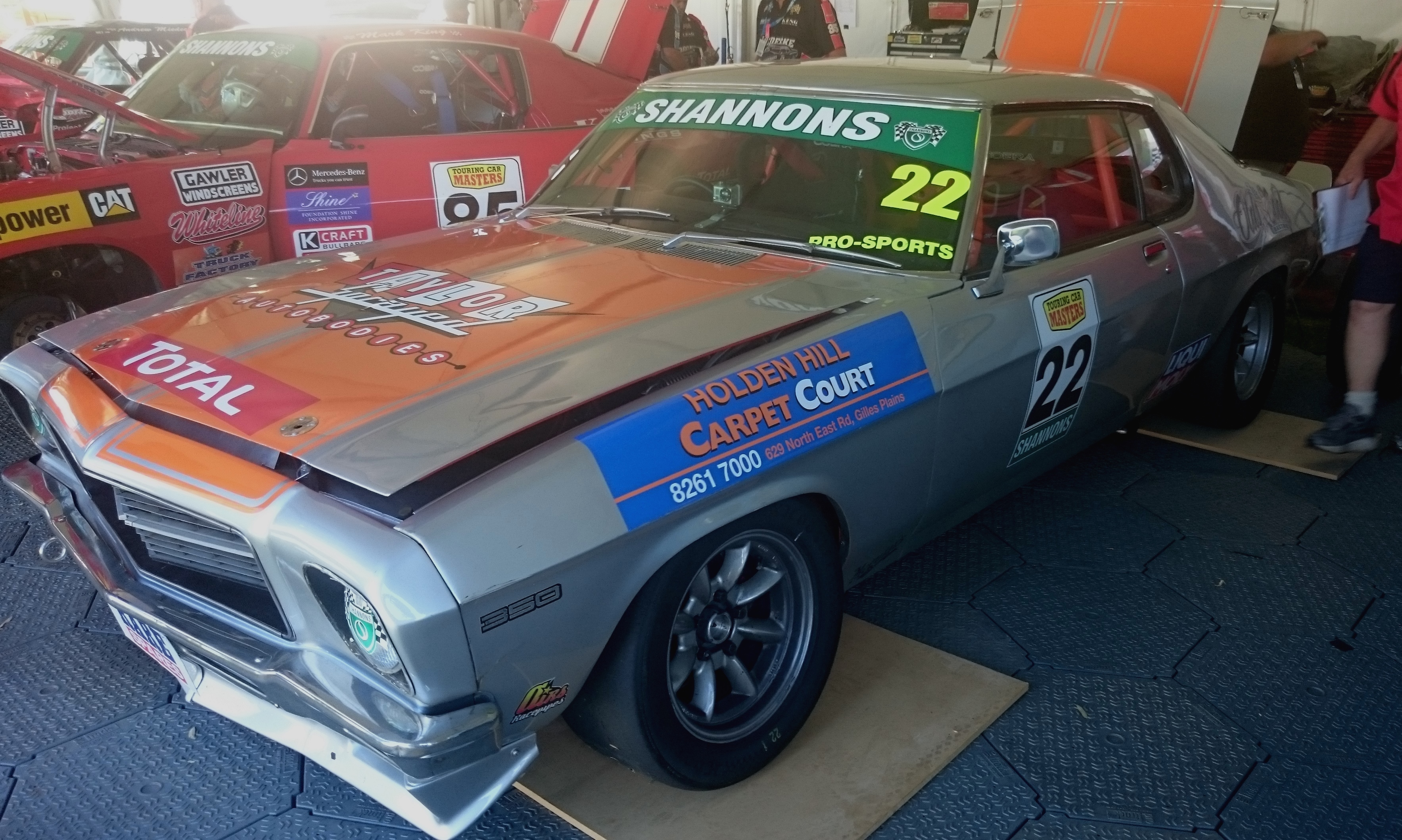
Nigel Benson (Holden Monaro) placed fourth in Pro Sport

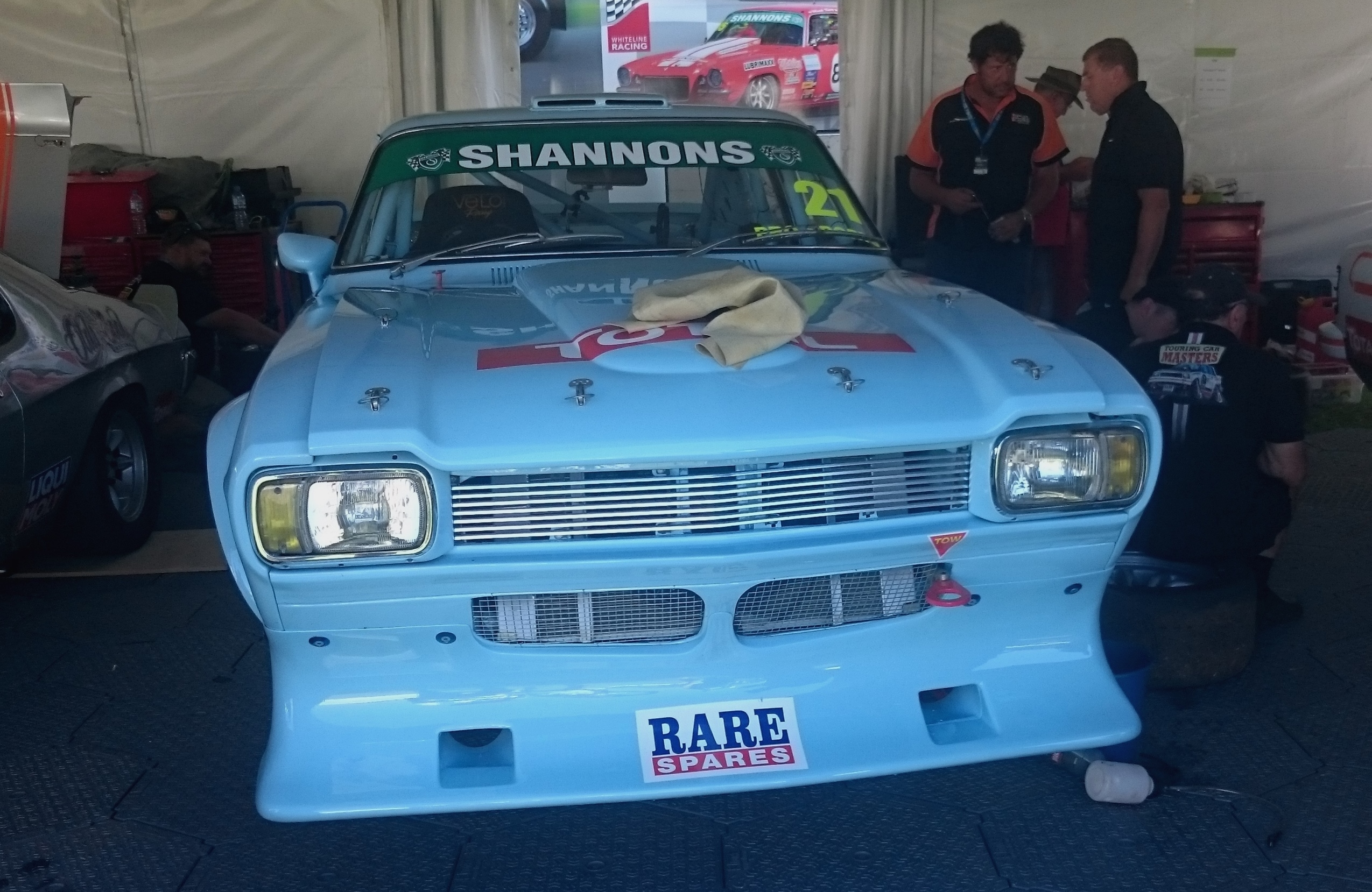
Greg Garwood (Ford Capri Perana) won the Invitational class

The following teams and drivers contested the series.

Team	Car	Class	No.	Drivers	Rounds
Shannons Insurance	1972 AMC Javelin	Pro Master	2	(New Zealand) Jim Richards	1–4,6–8
Shannons Insurance	1964 Ford Falcon Sprint	Pro Master	2	(New Zealand) Jim Richards	5
Skye Sands	1970 Ford Mustang Fastback	Pro Am	4	(Australia) Rusty French	All
Performance & Race Tech Services	1974 Holden Torana	Pro Am	5	(Australia) Bruce Williams	3
Werks Garage/Red Rock Winery; Werks Garage/Kalus Kenny Intelex	1974 Porsche 911 RS	Pro Sport	7	(Australia) Rohan Little	3,5
Werks Garage/Red Rock Winery; Werks Garage/Kalus Kenny Intelex	1974 Porsche 911 RS	Pro Sport	90	(Australia) Sven Burchartz	3,5
SportsMed	1973 Porsche 911 RS	Pro Sport	8	(Australia) Greg Keene	5
SportsMed	1973 Porsche 911 RS	Pro Sport	32	(Australia) Amanda Sparks	1
SportsMed	1973 Porsche 911 RS	Pro Sport	33	(Australia) Greg Keene	1
Jesus Racing	1971 Ford Falcon XY GTHO	Pro Am	9	(Australia) Andrew Fisher	1–6
Sunliner RV	1975 Chevrolet Monza 2+2	Pro Master	10	(Australia) Greg Ritter	1–2
Leukemia Foundation / Climate; PRT Fabrication; Aussie Muscle Car Run	1973 Ford Falcon XA GT	Pro Sport	11	(Australia) Graham Stewart	1
Leukemia Foundation / Climate; PRT Fabrication; Aussie Muscle Car Run	1972 Holden Monaro GTS	Pro Sport	22	(Australia) Nigel Benson	1,4,7
Leukemia Foundation / Climate; PRT Fabrication; Aussie Muscle Car Run	1972 Holden Monaro GTS	Pro Sport	22	(Australia) Graham Stewart	2–3,5–6
Giraffe Civil Contracting	1974 Holden Torana SL/R 5000	Pro Sport	12	(Australia) Adam Garwood	1–6
Giraffe Civil Contracting	1971 Ford Capri Perana	Pro Sport	21	(Australia) Greg Garwood	1–4
Giraffe Civil Contracting	1971 Ford Capri Perana	Pro Sport	21	(Australia) Adam Garwood	7
Mark Poole Motorsport	1974 Porsche 911 IROC	Pro Sport	13	(Australia) Rory O'Neill	1,5
TIFS - Warehousing & Distribution; Synergy Race Engines	1973 Ford Falcon XY GTHO	Pro Master	17	(Australia) Steven Johnson	1–4,6–7
TIFS - Warehousing & Distribution; Synergy Race Engines	1971 Ford Falcon XY	Pro Master	17	(Australia) Steven Johnson	8
TIFS - Warehousing & Distribution; Synergy Race Engines	1969 Ford Mustang Trans Am	Pro Am	88	(Australia) Tony Karanfilovski	All
Wilson Security / PAYCE	1974 Holden Torana SL/R 5000	Pro Master	18	(Australia) John Bowe	All
Tincome Industrial Services	1972 Holden Monaro	Pro Sport	19	(Australia) Darren Beale	3–8
Freestone Transport; Maxi-Trans Trailers	1968 Chevrolet Camaro SS	Pro Am	25	(Australia) Paul Freestone	1–2,7
Angliss Meats	Ford Mustang Fastback	Invitational	25	(Australia) Brett Curran	5
Tilley Auto Garage	1964 Ford Mustang Coupe	Pro Sport	28	(Australia) Brad Tilley	8
Thunder Road Racing Team Australia	1964 Ford Mustang Coupe	Pro Master	30	(Australia) Glenn Seton	All
iSeek Racing	1974 Holden Torana SL/R 5000	Pro Am	35	(Australia) Jason Gomersall	1–7
iSeek Racing	1971 Holden Torana	Pro Am	35	(Australia) Jason Gomersall	8
Treloar Roses/Mick Wilson Plumbing	Chrysler Valiant Charger R/T	Invitational	43	(Australia) Mick Wilson	4
THD Motorsport	1969 Ford Boss Mustang	Pro Am	46	(Australia) Leo Tobin	1–3,5–8
Adelaide's Cheapest Cars; Melbourne's Cheapest Cars; Darwin's Cheapest Cars; Brisbane's Cheapest Cars; Sydney's Cheapest Cars	1974 Ford Falcon XB Hardtop	Pro Master	48	(Australia) Eddie Abelnica	All
Outbound Racing/wheels.com.pg	Holden Monaro GTS	Pro Am	52	(Australia) Keith Kassulke	5,7
Gabriel Shock Absorbers	Holden Monaro HQ Coupe	Pro Am	56	(Australia) Brett Youlden	6–7
Glennan Transport; Dulux; ANGLOMOIL	1969 Valiant Pacer	Pro Am	60	(Australia) Cameron Tilley	1–4,7–8
Cannon Trailers	Ford Falcon XY GTHO	Pro Sport	65	(Australia) Michael Cannon	4–5
Trans Am Race Engineering	Chevrolet Camaro SS	Invitational	68	(Australia) Grant Wilson	5
Lyndways Builders	1971 Ford Falcon XY GTHO	Pro Am	74	(Australia) Wayne Mercer	1–4,6–8
Whiteline Racing; King Springs; CAV Power; Fabre Australia	1970 Chevrolet Camaro RS	Pro Master	85	(Australia) Mark King	All
Whiteline Racing; King Springs; CAV Power; Fabre Australia	1969 Chevrolet Camaro SS	Pro Master	95	(Australia) Andrew Miedecke	1
Whiteline Racing; King Springs; CAV Power; Fabre Australia	1969 Chevrolet Camaro SS	Pro Am	95	(Australia) Bob Middleton	4
Whiteline Racing; King Springs; CAV Power; Fabre Australia	1969 Chevrolet Camaro SS	Pro Am	95	(Australia) Adam Bressington	5–8
John's Furniture Removals	1964 Mercury Comet	Pro Sport	97	(Australia) Allen Boughen	2,5,7

== Race calendar ==
The series was contested over eight rounds. Each round comprised a minimum of two Series Races and a Trophy Race.

Round	Event	Circuit	City / state	Date
1	Rare Spares Adelaide Trophy	(South Australia) Adelaide Street Circuit	Adelaide, South Australia	3–6 March
2	Shannons Touring Car Festival	(Victoria (state)) Sandown Raceway	Melbourne, Victoria	1–3 April
3	Rare Spares Rose City Trophy	(Victoria (state)) Winton Raceway	Winton, Victoria	20–22 May
4	Shannons Thunder in The Valley	(Northern Territory) Hidden Valley Raceway	Darwin, Northern Territory	17–19 June
5	Rare Spares Queensland Tourist Trophy	Queensland Raceway	Ipswich, Queensland	22–24 July
6	Shannons Phillip Island Tourist Trophy	(Victoria (state)) Phillip Island Grand Prix Circuit	Phillip Island, Victoria	9–11 September
7	Touring Car Masters Mountain Masters	(New South Wales) Mount Panorama	Bathurst, New South Wales	6–9 October
8	The Masters Tourist Trophy	(New South Wales) Sydney Olympic Park	Sydney, New South Wales	2–4 December

== Classes ==
Each automobile was allocated into one of the following classes:

- Pro-Master
- Pro-Am
- Pro-Sport
- Invitational

== Points system ==
Series points were awarded in each Series Race per the following table:

Pos.	1st	2nd	3rd	4th	5th	6th	7th	8th	9th	10th	11th	12th	13th	14th	15th	16th	17th	18th	19th	20th	21st	22nd	23rd	24th	25th	26th	27th	28th	29th	30th	31st	32nd	33rd	34th	35th	36th	37th	38th	39th	40th
Points	60	56	52	48	45	42	39	36	33	30	27	24	21	18	17	16	15	14	13	12	11	10	9	8	7	6	5	4	3	2	2	2	2	2	2	1	1	1	1	1

In addition, each driver was awarded 25 points for each Trophy Race in which they started and 25 points for each Trophy Race in which they finished.

== Series standings ==
Pos.	Driver	Car	Ade (South Australia)			San (Victoria (state))			Win (Victoria (state))			Hid (Northern Territory)			Que (Queensland)			Phi (Victoria (state))			Bat (New South Wales)			Syd (New South Wales)			Pts.
Pro Master
1	John Bowe	Holden Torana	2	3	6	2	1	3	1	1	6	2	5	Ret	4	1	1	2	1	1	2	8	2	2	1	3	1167
2	Glenn Seton	Ford Mustang	3	5	12	Ret		4	3	3	1	3	2	3	1	2	2	3	2	6	1	21	1	3	2	6	1087
3	Eddie Abelnica	Ford XB Falcon	5	2	9	5		5	5	6	10	6	3	6	3	5	6	1	4	11	17	16	13	6	3	5	1078
4	Steven Johnson	Ford XY Falcon	6	6	14	3		10	4	4	17	1	1	10				7	3	3	3	6	4	1	Ret	1	914
5	Mark King	Chevrolet Camaro	8	8	11	10		2	8	7	15	8	8	7	6	6	7	14	9	4	5	9	5	Ret	5	4	881
6	Jim Richards	AMC Javelin; Ford Falcon Sprint	4	Ret	DNS	1		14	6	5	11	4	6	8	11	Ret	DNS	8	8	8	7	13	9				696
7	Greg Ritter	Chevrolet Monza	1	1	13	Ret		Ret																			234
8	Andrew Miedecke	Chevrolet Camaro SS	9	4	3																						131
Pro Am
1	Jason Gomersall	Holden Torana	10	10	7	6		9	2	2	12	9	4	15	2	3	3	5	6	15	8	20	8	9	7	11	1008
2	Tony Karanfilovski	Ford Mustang	Ret	DNS	DNS	4		13	Ret	10	3	5	17	11	8	7	9	9	10	2	10	7	10	4	4	9	780
3	Rusty French	Ford Mustang	17	14	8	13		12	Ret	14	14	12	11	2	12	10	11	11	11	9	14	3	14	10	10	12	741
4	Wayne Mercer	Ford XY Falcon	Ret	15	5	11		11	13	15	13	10	12	1	12	Ret	Ret				Ret	18	16	8	Ret	7	576
5	Andrew Fisher	Ford XY Falcon	20	9	2	7		1	7	12	7	7	7	9	7	Ret	DNS	Ret	DNS	DNS							493
6	Leo Tobin	Ford Mustang	14	13	DNS	15		Ret	Ret	13	Ret				13	DNS	15	10	12	10	18	5	17	11	12	Ret	493
7	Adam Bressington	Chevrolet Camaro SS													5	4	8	4	5	12	6	2	3	Ret	6	8	438
8	Cameron Tilley	Chrysler Valiant Pacer	Ret	Ret	DNS	14		7	10	16	5	Ret	Ret	DNS							12	14	12	5	8	2	376
9	Paul Freestone	Chevrolet Camaro	7	7	16	8		8													13	11	Ret				290
10	Brett Youlden	Holden HQ Monaro GTS																6	7	5	4	15	7				190
11	Keith Kassulke	Holden Monaro GTS													21	DNS	5				11	10	11				122
12	Bruce Williams	Holden Torana							Ret	11	8																77
13	Bob Middleton	Chevrolet Camaro SS										13	13	DNS													45
Pro Sport
1	Adam Garwood	Holden Torana	11	11	1	9		6	11	8	2	14	9	4	10	8	4	13	15	7							634
2	Darren Beale	Holden Monaro GTS							15	19	16	18	15	14	20	18	Ret	16	14	14	Ret	19	20	DNS	13	13	424
3	Graham Stewart	Ford XA Falcon	18	19	15	16		Ret	Ret	DNS	DNS	DNS	16	16	13			15	13	13							352
4	Nigel Benson	Holden Monaro	13	12	4							15	14	12							19	17	19				244
5	Sven Burchartz	Porsche 911 RS							9	9	9	14	11	Ret													192
6	Micheal Cannon	Ford XY Falcon GTHO										16	16	13	17	13	12										173
7	Allen Boughen	Mercury Comet													18	12	13				16	4	18				152
8	Rohan Little	Porsche 911 RS							14	17	Ret				15	14	Ret										125
9	Greg Keene	Porsche 911 RS	16	DNS	DNS										16	15	14										102
10	Brad Tilley	Ford Mustang																						Ret	11	10	80
11	Rory O'Neill	Porsche 911 RS IROC													19	17	17										80
12	Tony Hunter	Chevrolet Monza 2+2																			15	12	15				60
13	Amanda Sparks	Porsche 911 RS	15	16	Ret																						59
14	Mick Wilson	Chrysler Valiant Charger R/T										17	Ret	DNS													16
Invitational
1	Greg Garwood	Ford Capri	12	17	10	12		15	12	18	4	11	10	5													680
2	Brett Curran	Ford Mustang													9	9	10										170
3	Grant Wilson	Chevrolet Camaro SS													22	19	18										162
4	Jim Richards	AMC Javelin																						7	9	Ret	145
5	Rory O'Neill	Porsche 911 IROC	19	18	Ret																						137
6	Allen Boughen	Mercury Comet				Ret		16																			106
7	Dave Roberts	Chevrolet Camaro SS																			20	22	21				60
8	Adam Garwood	Ford Capri Parena																			9	1	6				60
Pos.	Driver	Ade (South Australia)			San (Victoria (state))			Win (Victoria (state))			Hid (Northern Territory)			Que (Queensland)			Phi (Victoria (state))			Bat (New South Wales)			Syd (New South Wales)			Pts.	
